= Cops (TV program) =

American reality documentary police series

- Genre: Documentary; Reality
- Created by: John Langley; Malcolm Barbour
- Developed by: Stephen Chao
- Directed by: Dale Dimmick; Gabriel Koura
- Narrated by: Burt Lancaster (season 1); Harry Newman
- Opening theme: "Bad Boys" by Inner Circle
- Ending theme: "Bad Boys" by Inner Circle (Instrumental version)
- Composers: Michael Lewis (pilot); Nathan Wang (season 1)
- Country of origin: United States
- Original language: English (Note: Spanish dubbing available on SAP for post–2000 episodes.)
- No. of seasons: 38
- No. of episodes: 1,279

Production
- Executive producers: John Langley; Malcolm Barbour
- Producers: Andy Thomas (1989–1990, season 2); Murray Jordan (1997–2001, seasons 10–13); Jimmy Langley (2001–present, seasons 14–present); Morgan Langley (2007–present, seasons 20–present)
- Running time: 30 minutes
- Production companies: Barbour/Langley Productions (1989–1999, seasons 1–11); Fox Television Stations Productions (1989–2013); Langley Productions (1999–present, seasons 12–present); Fox Entertainment (season 33–present)

Original release
- Network: Fox
- Release: March 11, 1989 – May 4, 2013
- Network: Paramount Network (Note: Known as Spike from 2013 to 2018.)
- Release: September 14, 2013 – May 11, 2020
- Network: Fox Nation
- Release: October 1, 2021 – present

Cops (stylized in all caps as COPS) is an American documentary television series that is currently in its 38th season. It is produced by Langley Productions and premiered on the Fox network on March 11, 1989. The series, known for chronicling the lives of law enforcement officials, follows police officers and sheriff's deputies, sometimes backed up by state police or other state agencies, during patrol, calls for service, and other police activities including prostitution and narcotic stings, and occasionally the serving of search and arrest warrants at criminal residences. Some episodes have also featured federal agencies.

The show's formula follows the cinéma vérité convention, which does not consist of any narration, scripted dialogue, incidental music or added sound effects, depending entirely on the commentary of the officers and on the actions of the people with whom they come into contact, giving the audience a fly on the wall point of view. Each episode typically consists of three self-contained segments which often end with one or more arrests.

It is one of the longest-running television shows in the United States and, in May 2011, it became the longest-running show on Fox (since then, its duration has been surpassed by the duration of The Simpsons). It also became the longest running live action series on Fox. When America's Most Wanted was canceled after 23 years, the show's host John Walsh, made numerous appearances on Cops. In 2013, the program moved to Spike (now Paramount Network).

In late 2007, during the premiere of its 20th season, episodes of Cops began broadcasting in widescreen, though not in high definition. In June 2020, Paramount Network pulled the show from its schedule in response to George Floyd protests, after the murder of George Floyd by an officer of the Minneapolis Police Department, and announced its cancellation days later.

The show remains in production for its international and overseas partners, and began to film anew in Spokane County, Washington, with its sheriff's department in October 2020. In September 2021, it was announced that Fox sibling Fox Nation picked up the show. The 34th season premiered in September 2022. Season 35 premiered on April 7, 2023. Following a three month hiatus, the show returned on October 6. Season 36 would premiere on April 5, 2024 with several episodes featuring beach patrol officers during spring break. Season 37 would premiere on March 7, 2025, initially consisting of 10 special spring break-themed and Las Vegas-themed episodes before airing its first standard episode on October 24, 2025. Season 38 premiered in the summer of 2026. Filming for the upcoming 38th season of Cops got underway by May 2025.

== History ==
Cops was created by John Langley and Malcolm Barbour, who tried unsuccessfully for several years to get a network to carry the program. When the 1988 Writers Guild of America strike forced networks to find other kinds of programming, the young Fox Television network picked up the low-cost Cops, which had no union writers.

The program premiered on the Fox television network on March 11, 1989, following a seven-week test run on six Fox owned-and-operated stations. The program was one of only two remaining first-run prime-time programs airing on Saturday nights on the four major American broadcast television networks (along with CBS's 48 Hours Mystery). Malcolm Barbour left from producing Cops in 1994.

For the first 25 seasons, Cops was broadcast by the Fox television network with reruns of earlier seasons syndicated by local television stations and cable networks, including truTV and G4. After Fox canceled the show in May 2013, Spike, which later became known as the Paramount Network, picked it up for an additional five seasons, in addition to reruns of previous seasons. The 30th season premiered on June 17, 2017.

On August 21, 2017, Cops celebrated its 1,000th episode with a live special called Cops: Beyond the Bust, hosted by Terry Crews (who plays a police sergeant in the sitcom Brooklyn Nine-Nine), which included historical clips from the run of the program as well as reunions of officers and the suspects that they arrested. The date of the 1,000th episode also marked a shift of episode premieres from Saturdays to Mondays.

The show follows officers in 140 different cities in the United States, British Hong Kong, London, and the former Soviet Union.

In the wake of the protests following the murder of George Floyd in Minneapolis, Minnesota under police custody, Paramount Network pulled the series from the air ahead of its season 33 premiere, which was scheduled for June 1, 2020. On June 9, 2020, a network spokesperson announced "Cops is not on the Paramount Network and we don't have any current or future plans for it to return". The episode "Party in a Box" (season 28, episode 20, originally aired December 12, 2015) featured Atlanta Police Department Officer Garrett Rolfe, who in 2020 was charged with the killing of Rayshard Brooks during a driving under the influence investigation.

In September 2020, Cops resumed production. The new episodes were being produced for international syndication and to fulfill contracts overseas that had not expired; Langley did not secure a domestic distributor until 2021. Rocket Rights picked up the show for distribution outside the United States in early-2021, with Langley's distribution unit, Langley Television Distribution (as of 2021) handling sales in the United States.

On September 13, 2021, it was announced that Fox's sister streaming service Fox Nation had picked up the show. The 33rd season premiered on October 1, 2021. Fox Nation premiered the show's 34th season on September 30, 2022.

On July 11, 2025, Cops, which still regularly airs on Fox Nation, aired a new episode on the Paramount Network again titled "Stick and Move".

== Production ==
Cops was created by John Langley and his producing partner Malcolm Barbour. In 1983 they were working on Cocaine Blues, a television series about drugs. As part of his research Langley went on a drug raid with drug enforcement officers and was inspired to create a show focusing on real-life law enforcement. Before that, there had been only a few instances of cinéma vérité productions documenting the work of police officers, such as Roger Graef's Police in 1982.

In the late 1980s, after producing the live syndicated specials American Vice: The Doping of a Nation, Murder: Live From Death Row, and Devil's Worship: Exposing Satan's Underground all with Geraldo Rivera, Langley and Barbour pitched the Cops show concept to Stephen Chao, a Fox programming executive who would one day become president of the Fox Television Stations Group and later USA Network. Chao liked the concept and pitched it to Barry Diller, then Chief Executive Officer of the Fox Network. Malcolm Barbour left from producing Cops in 1994.

A Writers Guild of America strike was occurring at the time and the network needed new material. An unscripted show that did not require writers was ideal for Fox. The first season aired in 1989 and consisted of 15 episodes featuring the Broward County Sheriff's Office. Since then, it has often been one of the highest-rated reality-TV programs, in part due to its low production cost (estimated at US$200,000 per episode in the early 1990s) and thus its capacity to show new material each week.

The original concept of the show was to follow officers home and tape their home lives along with their work. After a while, the idea was deemed too artificial by Langley and abandoned. Thereafter, the format of three self-contained unscripted segments without narration or music became the show's formula.

Since the third episode of Season 2, every episode ends with a police radio excerpt referencing the intersection of SE 132nd Ave. and SE Bush St. in the Powellhurst-Gilbert, Portland, Oregon neighborhood of Portland, Oregon. A female officer says, "132 and Bush, I've got him at gunpoint", and a female dispatcher replies, "132 and Bush. Cover's Code 3." Another woman says, "Units 25, 14 can transmit on Tac 2", and the dispatcher replies, "Okay, we'll still send it Code 3." Then an instrumental version of "Bad Boys" plays over the credits. On the first season of Cops, instead of "132 and Bush, I've got him at gunpoint", it was a police radio excerpt from the Broward County, Florida Sheriff's Office. In the first two episodes of the second season, a different police radio excerpt from the Portland Bureau of Police was used.

Cops aired on Fox's traditional Saturday-night lineup since its debut in 1989. As of 2012, the program retained its traditional time slot, but aired more intermittently as Fox Sports scheduled more sports programming in Saturday-night primetime, with NASCAR on Fox in the late winter and spring, Major League Baseball on Fox throughout the spring and summer, Fox College Football in the fall, and various Fox UFC throughout the year. Cops was then scheduled on weeks without any sporting events, followed by an encore presentation of a Fox drama series.

In 2013, it was announced that Fox had cancelled the program. However, it was later announced that Spike had picked up the program for another season. In August 2017, Spike moved the show's time slot to Monday.

== Agencies featured ==
American agencies
State	Agencies
Alabama	Birmingham Police Department; Mobile Police Department
Alaska	Alaska State Troopers; Anchorage Police Department; Kodiak Police Department
Arizona	Glendale Police Department; Maricopa County Sheriff's Office; Mesa Police Department; Phoenix Police Department; Tucson Police Department
Arkansas	Little Rock Police Department; North Little Rock Police Department
California	Alameda County Sheriff's Office; Cathedral City Police Department; Colton Police Department; Fontana Police Department; Fresno County Sheriff's Department; Fresno Police Department; Fullerton Police Department; Garden Grove Police Department; Indio Police Department; Kern County Sheriff's Office; Los Angeles County Sheriff's Department; Los Angeles Police Department; Orange Police Department; Palm Springs Police Department; Pomona Police Department; Rialto Police Department; Riverside County Sheriff's Department; Sacramento County Sheriff's Department; Sacramento Police Department; Salinas Police Department; San Bernardino County Sheriff's Department; San Bernardino Police Department; San Diego County Sheriff's Department; San Jose Police Department; Santa Ana Police Department; Santa Rosa Police Department; Sonoma County Sheriff's Office; Stockton Police Department; Whittier Police Department
Colorado	Adams County Sheriff's Office; Aurora Police Department; Denver Police Department
Florida	Boynton Beach Police Department; Brevard County Sheriff's Office; Broward County Sheriff's Office; Escambia County Sheriff's Office; Fort Myers Police Department; Hillsborough County Sheriff's Office; Homestead Police Department; Jacksonville Sheriff's Office; Key West Police Department; Lee County Sheriff's Office; Leon County Sheriff's Department; Marion County Sheriff's Office; Martin County Sheriff's Office; Miami Beach Police Department; Miami Police Department; Miami-Dade Police Department; Okaloosa County Sheriff's Office; Palm Beach County Sheriff's Office; Palm Beach Gardens Police Department; Pasco County Sheriff's Office; Pinellas County Sheriff's Office; Pompano Beach Police Department; Riviera Beach Police Department; Santa Rosa County Sheriff's Office; Sarasota County Sheriff's Office; Tampa Police Department; West Palm Beach Police Department
Georgia	Atlanta Police Department; Cobb County Sheriff's Office; Forsyth County Sheriff's Office; Fulton County Police Department; Fulton County Sheriff's Office; Gwinnett County Police Department; Richmond County Sheriff's Office; Savannah-Chatham Metropolitan Police Department
Hawaii	Maui County Police Department
Idaho	Boise Police Department
Illinois	Aurora Police Department; Cook County Sheriff's Office
Indiana	Fort Wayne Police Department; Hamilton County Sheriff's Office; Indianapolis Metropolitan Police Department; Speedway Police Department
Iowa	Des Moines Police Department
Kansas	Kansas City Police Department; Lawrence Police Department; Sedgwick County Sheriff's Office; Wichita Police Department
Kentucky	Covington Police Department
Louisiana	Lafayette Police Department; New Orleans Police Department
Maryland	Anne Arundel County Police Department; Baltimore Police Department
Massachusetts	Boston Police Department; Chelsea Police Department; Lowell Police Department; Lynn Police Department; Revere Police Department
Michigan	Flint Police Department; Lansing Police Department
Minnesota	Minneapolis Police Department
Mississippi	Gulfport Police Department
Missouri	Independence Police Department; Jackson County Sheriff's Office; Kansas City Police Department; Springfield Police Department
Nebraska	Omaha Police Department
Nevada	Las Vegas Metropolitan Police Department; North Las Vegas Police Department; Nye County Sheriff's Office
New Jersey	Hoboken Police Department; Jersey City Police Department; New Jersey State Police; Passaic County Sheriff's Office; Paterson Police Department
New Mexico	Albuquerque Police Department; Bernalillo County Sheriff's Department
New York	Buffalo Police Department; Erie County Sheriff's Office; New York City Police Department; New York City Transit Police
North Carolina	Davidson County Sheriff’s Office; Forsyth County Sheriff's Office
Ohio	Cincinnati Police Department; Cleveland Division of Police; Hamilton County Sheriff's Office; Norwood Police Division; Toledo Police Department
Oklahoma	Broken Arrow Police Department; Muskogee Police Department; Tulsa County Sheriff's Office
Oregon	Crook County Sheriff's Office; Multnomah County Sheriff's Office; Portland Police Bureau Washington County Sheriff's Office
Pennsylvania	Hazleton Police Department; Philadelphia Highway Patrol; Philadelphia Police Department; Pittsburgh Police
Rhode Island	Providence Police Department
South Carolina	Anderson County Sheriff's Office; Greenville County Sheriff's Office; Richland County Sheriff's Department
South Dakota	Mitchell Police Department; Pennington County Sheriff's Office
Tennessee	Chattanooga Police Department; Memphis Police Department; Metropolitan Nashville Police Department; Shelby County Sheriff's Office
Texas	Amarillo Police Department; Beaumont Police Department; Bexar County Sheriff's Office; Corpus Christi Police Department; Dallas Police Department; El Paso Police Department; Fort Bend County Sheriff's Office; Fort Worth Police Department; Grand Prairie Police Department; Harris County Sheriff's Office; Houston Police Department; Lubbock Police Department; Montgomery County Sheriff's Office; Pasadena Police Department; Tarrant County Sheriff's Office; Travis County Sheriff's Office
Virginia	Chesapeake Police Department; Newport News Police Department; Petersburg Police Department; Virginia Beach Police Department
Washington	King County Police Department; King County Sheriff's Office; Lakewood Police Department; Olympia Police Department; Pierce County Sheriff's Department; Snohomish County Sheriff's Office; Spokane County Sheriff's Office; Spokane Police Department; Spokane Valley Police Department; Thurston County Sheriff's Office
West Virginia	Charleston Police Department
Wisconsin	Green Bay Police Department
Federal	U.S. Customs and Border Protection; United States Marshals Service
Railroad	Conrail Police Department

International agencies
Countries	Agencies
British Hong Kong	Royal Hong Kong Police
USSR	Militsiya
United Kingdom	Metropolitan Police

== Camera crew involvement ==
In one episode, the production sound mixer for the camera crew, a former emergency medical technician, assisted a police officer in performing cardiopulmonary resuscitation (season 2, episode 7).

In an episode in season 11 that took place in 1998 in Atlanta, Georgia, camera operator Si Davis, who was a Las Vegas Metropolitan Police Department reserve police officer, dropped the camera and assisted an Atlanta police officer in wrestling a suspect into custody. It turned out that the APD officer had been injured during a foot pursuit; meanwhile, mixing console Steve Kiger picked up the camera and continued recording the action, which eventually made the air (season 11, episode 5).

In another episode, a rape suspect fled and outran officers, only to have the cameraman follow him the entire time, until police caught up to the suspect and subdued him (season 10, episode 19).

In season 13, episode 18, a cameraman caught up to a suspect and pushed them to the ground before the officer arrived to arrest them.

In an episode of season 14 (2001–2002), during the arrest of a man after a car chase in Hillsborough County, Florida, the sound mixer held the suspect's sister away from the deputy after she tried to intervene in her brother's arrest.

During the first episode of season 22, which aired on September 12, 2009, an officer with the Las Vegas Metropolitan Police Department was tackled by a suspect. The camera operator and Las Vegas Fire Department personnel wrestled the suspect away from the officer.

In episode 32 of season 22, an officer from Amarillo, Texas Police Department responded to a possible auto burglary. The suspect was found inside the car and attempted to flee from the responding officer; however the suspect was stopped by the production sound mixer that was standing in the path that the suspect intended on escaping with.

In episode 17 of season 26 that aired on February 1, 2014, during the arrest of a man in Sacramento, California, for battery on his girlfriend, one of the camera crew pulled one of the suspect's American pit bull terrier away from one of the arresting officers. The dog was biting the officer on the leg after being commanded to do so by the suspect.

During the recording of episode 7 in Season 27, the camera crew assisted in detaining the passenger of a vehicle whose operator had fled on foot from officers in Lafayette, Louisiana. As police chased the driver, who successfully evaded arrest, the camera crew secured the vehicle by giving directions to the passenger; at one point, the camera operator can be seen gesturing to the passenger to place the latter's hands on the dashboard.

=== 2014 Wendy's shooting incident ===
On August 26, 2014, at roughly 9:20 p.m., a Cops crew was recording with the Omaha Police Department in Omaha, Nebraska, during their final week working with them since arriving in June. A police officer drove to a Wendy's restaurant during a robbery and called for backup. One of the other responding officers had a two-person Cops crew (a cameraman and audio technician Bryce Dion) present in his or her cruiser. The crew began recording the robbery inside Wendy's.

Authorities later identified the robber as 32-year-old Cortez Washington, whom police shot several times during the shootout. A police officer fired through a window, hitting Dion (wearing a bullet-resistant vest) once under the arm. Medics transported both to the University of Nebraska Medical Center, and both died, with Dion being pronounced dead shortly after arrival.

The 38-year-old Dion had worked on Cops for seven years. Langley Productions stated that, in 25 years of video recording, this was the first incident in which a crew member was seriously injured or killed. A Cops crew working in Springfield, Missouri, also wrapped following the Omaha incident. In Dion's honor, the show aired an hour-long "best of" episode featuring his work on its September 20, 2014 episode.

The robbery's events took only seconds to happen. Detective Darren Cunningham responded to the call while the Cops crew accompanied Officer Brooks Riley and Officer Jason Wilhelm. Cunningham and Riley entered the front door and unholstered their firearms, while Wilhelm went to the restaurant's back part to cover an emergency exit door that opens only from indoors. Cunningham and Riley approached Washington, who was at the restaurant's back part and did not see the officers arrive. For unknown reasons, Washington walked to the front counter, where the officers identified him and told him to lie on the floor—but Washington immediately pointed and fired a pistol while moving toward the officers, who returned fire. Cunningham retreated into the hallway toward the restroom and kept firing at Washington, who had then turned the corner and stood where the officers had initiated contact. Riley moved around a column and into the waiting aisle at the counter. As Washington passed the uniformed police officer, he aimed his weapon toward the officer and continued firing as he moved toward the front exit. Dion was caught in the ensuing crossfire as the officer returned fire at Washington, who stumbled into the parking lot and fell from his injuries before his arrest.

After the scene was secured, authorities learned that Washington's pistol was actually an airsoft handgun that strongly resembled a real Taurus firearm.

Authorities placed the three police officers on paid leave pending the result of an investigation into the shooting. A grand jury acquitted all three of misconduct.

Washington had a lengthy criminal record in Wyandotte County, Kansas. At the time of the Wendy's robbery, he was on parole in Missouri, having been released in September 2013 after serving two years of a seven-year sentence as an accessory to second-degree robbery of a jewelry store, to which he pleaded guilty. In determining sentences and eligibility for parole, Missouri law does not consider criminal records in other states. Approximately 20 minutes before the Wendy's robbery, his 24-year-old girlfriend, Jeneva Arias, robbed a Little Caesars pizza restaurant, using the same airsoft pistol; Washington served as her getaway driver. Arias in turn was to be Washington's getaway driver in the Wendy's robbery, but fled. While in jail awaiting trial, she committed felony assault via throwing a soap mixture into a health care worker's face and fracturing a jailer's hand. Authorities gave Arias a plea bargain, and she pleaded no contest to reduced charges, and they sentenced her to a maximum of six years in jail through concurrent sentencing.

Bryce Dion's brother, Trevor Dion, filed a lawsuit in February 2016 against the City of Omaha, alleging that inadequate communication and coordination between dispatchers and the officers arriving at the scene contributed to Dion's death. The suit also blames the authorities' decision to invite the Cops video crew to go with officers. On April 24, 2018, a Douglas County District Judge refused the City of Omaha's request to bar the release of the video of the robbery-shooting at Wendy's and ordered the City of Omaha to release all materials related to the death of Bryce Dion, of which only still frames had been previously released. On April 25, 2018, the video recorded by the Cops camera crew was released. The video was shown in open court and the Omaha World-Herald requested a copy, which it later released. Trevor Dion's lawsuit against the city was dismissed by a judge in July 2019.

== Opening sequence ==
Inner Circle – Bad Boys

The show's theme song is "Bad Boys", performed by reggae group Inner Circle, which was played over a montage of clips.

All episodes of Cops began with a disclaimer. Beginning with later episodes of season 2, the wording was:

Cops is filmed on location with the men and women of law enforcement. All suspects are innocent until proven guilty in a court of law.

For special episodes of Cops, the wording for the disclaimer was:

This special edition of Cops is filmed on location with the men and women of law enforcement. All suspects are innocent until proven guilty in a court of law.

The disclaimer in the first two seasons was slightly different: "Cops is filmed on location as it happens. All suspects are considered innocent until proven guilty in a court of law." Burt Lancaster provided the following narration on the pilot episode: "Cops is about real people, and real crime. It was filmed entirely on location, with the men and women who work in law enforcement."

During at least the first season, episodes featured original scoring in a vein similar to the instrumental backing of the opening song. Some cues were short, others longer, usually over montages. Among the composers who scored episodes were Michael Lewis and Nathan Wang.

The Spike/Paramount Network version of the show added the Twitter and Instagram handles and Facebook URL as its social media pages to the intro in 2013 until it was removed in 2020.

== Episodes ==
Season	Episodes		Originally released		
Season	Episodes		First released	Last released	Network
1	15		March 11, 1989	June 17, 1989	Fox
2	31		September 23, 1989	May 5, 1990	Fox
3	42		September 15, 1990	August 3, 1991	Fox
4	45		August 10, 1991	August 8, 1992	Fox
5	46		August 15, 1992	August 14, 1993	Fox
6	46		August 7, 1993	December 17, 1994	Fox
7	41		May 14, 1994	November 10, 1995	Fox
8	43		February 25, 1995	July 13, 1996	Fox
9	36		August 31, 1996	July 26, 1997	Fox
10	36		September 6, 1997	August 1, 1998	Fox
11	36		September 12, 1998	September 18, 1999	Fox
12	36		September 11, 1999	July 29, 2000	Fox
13	40		May 20, 2000	July 7, 2001	Fox
14	36		September 1, 2001	September 21, 2002	Fox
15	36		May 4, 2002	November 1, 2003	Fox
16	41		April 26, 2003	October 2, 2004	Fox
17	36		May 15, 2004	August 6, 2005	Fox
18	36		September 10, 2005	July 22, 2006	Fox
19	36		September 9, 2006	July 28, 2007	Fox
20	38		September 8, 2007	August 2, 2008	Fox
21	36		September 7, 2008	July 25, 2009	Fox
22	36		September 12, 2009	July 31, 2010	Fox
23	22		September 11, 2010	June 18, 2011	Fox
24	22		September 10, 2011	April 7, 2012	Fox
25	16		December 15, 2012	May 4, 2013	Fox
26	22		September 14, 2013	March 8, 2014	Spike
27	33		July 12, 2014	May 9, 2015	Spike
28	33		June 20, 2015	April 30, 2016	Spike
29	33		June 4, 2016	April 22, 2017	Spike
30	33	22	June 17, 2017	November 13, 2017	Spike
30	33	11	January 22, 2018	May 21, 2018	Paramount Network
31	33		June 4, 2018	May 20, 2019	Paramount Network
32	33		June 3, 2019	May 11, 2020	Paramount Network
33	33		October 1, 2021	July 8, 2022	Fox Nation
34	17		September 30, 2022	March 31, 2023	Fox Nation
35	33		April 7, 2023	March 29, 2024	Fox Nation
36	36		April 5, 2024	July 25, 2025	Fox Nation
37	34		March 7, 2025	June 19, 2026	Fox Nation

== Syndication ==
=== Domestic ===
In September 1992, reruns of Cops went into broadcast syndication, and like Fox's fellow series The Simpsons, it became a mainstay of the format, with its carriage being led by Fox Television Stations itself, be it Fox stations or those stations which belong to its sister network MyNetworkTV; it was also consistently included on the schedule of The CW's smaller-market chain of local cable channels and broadcast subchannels, The CW Plus. Seasons 7–24 would air on Court TV which eventually rebranded to TruTV in 2008, over the course of its syndicated run from 1998–2014 on the network, seasons 7–24 would be broadcast on the network, in 2014, it was announced the program would be pulled off the air by 2015, due to its syndicated contract expiring, the network decided not to renew the contract and by January 2015, the network would stop airing the syndicated reruns. In the fall of 2013, it mainly began to air on Spike (now Paramount Network) on the cable side as part of that network's agreement to air new episodes, after several years on truTV. Older episodes were picked up by the now defunct Cloo in September 2014, after spending years on the now defunct G4, which was discontinued in December 2014. Local station syndication of the show was prevalent on most Fox stations and affiliates at the time, but as of 2015, older episodes were shifted into Cops Reloaded. WGN America also carried reruns of the regular version. At the start of 2016, the episodes in the now defunct Cloo/G4 package were moved into the Spike/Paramount Network syndicated package when the former G4-Cloo syndication agreement expired, giving that network the rights to the majority of the program. After Viacom's acquisition of Pluto TV in 2019, a 24/7 channel made up of episodes of the series directly programmed under license from Langley Productions was launched.

Related to Paramount ending its carriage of Cops in June 2020, it has also relinquished its syndication rights; WGN America, which began to convert to a general news network as NewsNation under new ownership, also decided to stop carrying the show at the end of its existing carriage contract, which happened to terminate by coincidence on June 30, 2020. Disney Media Distribution, which syndicates the FTSP-era episodes under its former name of 20th Television to local television stations, replaced the series for the remainder of the summer with the 2018–19 run of the defunct syndication version of Who Wants to Be a Millionaire on June 15 (of which an hour of episodes were distributed, as Cops was often paired with Live PD: Police Patrol, which was also pulled from syndication at the same time new episodes of that series were cancelled). Reelz began to carry Reloaded episodes again on September 3, 2021. Reelz also began to carry older episodes of the regular version from seasons 8–17. Since May 2023, Fox Business has also began carrying syndicated reruns of seasons 32, 33. Law & Crime Network carries syndicated broadcasts of Reloaded as of 2023.

=== International ===
Cops is broadcast in the UK on CBS Drama, CBS Reality and Fox. In Portugal the show is aired on Fox Crime, in Brazil on truTV, in Colombia on truTV, in Australia on Network Ten, 10 Bold (a sub-channel of Network Ten) and Crime + Investigation, in Japan on Fox Crime, in Philippines on C/S 9, in India on Star World and FOX Crime, in Norway on V4, in Sweden Reloaded airs on TV12 while original runs on TV6 and TV10, and in Denmark on Canal 9.

In Canada, both the original and Reloaded versions of the program aired on Action (now Adult Swim). BiteTV began airing the program in December 2014 (until its relaunch as Makeful in August 2015), while sibling channel RadX (which re-branded to BBC Earth in January 2017) began airing it on Monday, August 3, 2015.

=== Cops 2.0 ===
An enhanced version of the program branded as Cops 2.0 with live web chats and program facts aired on G4 from May 2007 to 2009.

=== Cops Reloaded ===
In January 2013, 20th Television announced that a new syndicated version titled Cops Reloaded would begin airing on CMT as well as local stations and The CW Plus. The new format features slightly edited segments of classic Cops episodes, allowing for four segments per each half-hour episode. This version contains all new graphics and soundbites during the opening theme song, and older segments are modified and framed to a sharpened widescreen image for the high-definition format if they were originated in standard-definition television.

== Home media ==
The program has had several "best-of" home videos, including Cops: In Hot Pursuit, Cops: Shots Fired, Cops: Bad Girls, Cops: Caught in the Act and Cops: Too Hot for TV which included segments containing profanity and nudity that was edited out of the network version. Cops: Too Hot for TV also had a deluxe edition which had a segment containing especially graphic content, including police finding a man who had hanged himself in his garage and the aftermaths of two different shootings. Before the aforementioned segment, there was an announcement by John Langley, stating that "This next segment isn't just too hot for TV, it's also probably too hot for this video. Once you've seen it, you'll know why."

A Cops: 20th Anniversary Edition two-disc DVD with viewer favorites from each season, several behind the scenes features, and the original one-hour pilot was released in the United States and Canada on February 19, 2008.

Title	Format	Ep #	Discs/tapes	Region 1 (US)	Special features	Distributors
Cops: In Hot Pursuit	VHS	-	1	-	N/A	Langley Productions
Cops: Shots Fired	VHS	-	1	-	N/A	Langley Productions
Cops: Bad Girls	VHS	-	1	-	N/A	Langley Productions
Cops: Caught in the Act	VHS	-	1	-	N/A	Langley Productions
Cops: Shots Fired	DVD	Special	1	March 23, 2004	Never-before-seen footage.	20th Century Fox Home Entertainment
Cops: Bad Girls	DVD	Special	1	March 23, 2004	Never-before-seen footage.	20th Century Fox Home Entertainment
Cops: Caught in the Act	DVD	Special	1	March 23, 2004	Never-before-seen footage	20th Century Fox Home Entertainment
Cops: The Bad Karma Collection Vol 1 and 2	DVD	Special	2	August 8, 2006	None	20th Century Fox Home Entertainment
Cops: 20th Anniversary Edition	DVD	1	2	February 19, 2008	Cops 20th Season Special Original Pilot Episode Parodies and tributes Famous Fan Favorite Scenes from all 20 Seasons The Story of Cops Cops on Cops Lights! Camera! Action! Toughest Takedowns	20th Century Fox Home Entertainment
Cops: Wildest Chases	DVD	Season 26, Episodes 8–9, 11–12, 15, 22 Season 27, Episode 03	1	May 19, 2015	None	Paramount Home Entertainment

== Tie-ins ==
In 1994, Pacific Gameworks created a proposal for a video game project intended for the Atari Jaguar based upon the TV show; however, production of the game never started and it was left unreleased.

In 1995, Nova Productions and Atari Games released a LaserDisc arcade game based on the show. The game uses live-action full motion video for graphics and consists of a driving stage and a shooting stage very similar to Mad Dog McCree.

In 1999, Cops associate producer and sound mixer Hank Barr published The Jump-Out Boys, a book about the show's production.

In 2001, Fox Interactive announced a game based upon the show for the Xbox entitled Cops: Too Hot for TV, it was going to be developed by Mass Media though was quietly canceled or abandoned during the restructuring and sale of Fox Interactive.

== Reception ==
=== Recognition ===
Cops has received four Primetime Emmy nominations, as of May 2017. The website of the Academy of Television Arts & Sciences specifically lists four nominations of Cops for Outstanding Informational Series (in 1989, 1990, 1993, and 1994) but ultimately no Emmy awards were awarded to the show.

Awards won have included:

- 1993: the American Television Award for Best Reality-Based Program
- 2008: American Cinema Editors, USA Eddie (award) for Best Edited Reality Series

Other nominations (not resulting in an award) have included:

- 2016: Critics' Choice Television Award for Best Unstructured Reality Show

=== Criticism ===
Even though it is popular and long-running, Cops has drawn mixed reviews, and it has also raised ethical questions.

==== Positive ====
In Season 3 (1991–1992), Alan Bunce of The Christian Science Monitor praised the show as network television's "only true 'cinema verite' series"—declaring it "innocent of re-enactments," and "free of fancy production effects," while remaining "doggedly faithful to its format." Bunce raved about its "honesty of tone" and the show's "commitment" to, in his words, "recording exactly what happens" (nothing more, nothing less)—"an implicit rebuke" to what he called "the excesses and sleight-of-hand" indulged in by most other "reality" shows. "Cops", he said, "is a stickler for authenticity."

==== Negative ====
In 1999, the Los Angeles Times' Pulitzer Prize-winning, long-time, television critic Howard Rosenberg chastised ride-along reality TV shows (like Cops, which he particularly named), as "uniting" police and media in ride-alongs where each party is "an extension of the other." When invading "private property with their cameras rolling," said Rosenberg, these partnerships' behavior is "appallingly indifferent" to the "fundamental privacy rights" of the people whose homes they invade, and the resulting TV shows depict "social and moral crises" deceptively, "without context"—doing so in "the most narrow, emotional terms" they can. In a 2009 interview, Cops executive producer John Langley admitted that his show is built around a three-segment structure, presenting an "action" piece, an "emotional" piece, and a "thought" piece (an example of the rule of three).

Rosenberg further describes such a commercial police–media partnership as exceptionally prone to media corruption—yielding misleading, one-sided perspectives. "The collusion potential is enormous," says Rosenberg, because a so-called "reality" series can choose to air nothing that they fear will put their partners (the police) in a bad light (an embarrassment which, says Rosenberg, would cut off the TV show's access to the ride-alongs, resulting in "no access, no show".)

A podcast called Headlong: Running from Cops started in April 2019. Presented by Dan Taberski, it investigates Cops and Live PD, their alleged treatment of participants and whether scenarios are portrayed truthfully.

Critics have noted the use of propaganda for cops, or copaganda, in the show Cops. The civil rights group Color of Change began a campaign to cancel Cops in 2013, stating that the show's producers and advertisers had "built a profit model around distorted and dehumanizing portrayals of Black Americans and the criminal justice system." Civil rights leader and president of Color of Change Rashad Robinson praised Paramount for cancelling the program, adding that shows such as Cops "that glorify police but will never show the deep level of police violence are not reality, they are P.R. arms for law enforcement. Law enforcement doesn’t need P.R. They need accountability in this country."

=== Targeted subjects ===
==== 2004 Old Dominion study ====
In June 2004, researchers at Old Dominion University videotaped 16 episodes of Cops and then evaluated them for crime content, and for the race and gender of characters depicted. They found prior studies statistically reinforced in their descriptions of racial misrepresentation on Cops. The study found that, on Cops, African-American men were overwhelmingly shown as perpetrators—usually of violent crimes—and Hispanic men (rarely depicted at all) were also usually depicted as violent criminals. The police officers depicted were overwhelmingly White, and the disproportionately few White offenders were more-often portrayed as involved in non-violent offenses. However, according to his son Morgan Langley, the show's co-creator John Langley deliberately selected footage featuring White suspects in an effort to counter racial stereotypes.

Statistical correlations between actual crime rates and types (by race and gender, as reported by the FBI's Uniform Crime Reports) and the Old Dominion study's analysis of characters in the Cops episodes indicated that the Cops episodes (on average) sharply skewed the numbers, racially, making African-American and Hispanic men appear far more responsible for violent crime than they actually are in the U.S. population at large. At the same time, White males were shown on Cops as a far less culpable group than they actually are, statistically.

The study also noted that women were almost totally ignored in Cops—seldom appearing as either officers or offenders. Finally, it noted that the show overwhelmingly depicted violent crimes, despite such crimes being a distinct minority of crime in the U.S.

==== 2004 Prosise-Johnson study ====
In 2004, researchers Theodore O. Prosise (University of Washington), and Ann Johnson, Ph.D. (University of California/Long Beach), studied a random, but non-scientific, sample of 81 anecdotes from Cops episodes—analyzing their content, subjects and characters. They concluded that the program was racially skewed, negatively misrepresenting African-Americans, depicted as a criminal class out of proportion to their actual percentage of U.S. crime, in particular.

Moreover, the study indicated that the Cops episodes appeared to selectively edit out failed police efforts, and police-initiated actions "on a hunch" that resulted in the discovery of no grounds for an intervention or arrest—showing only those officer "hunches and suspicions" that were productive—creating the illusion that officer instincts were more reliable and valid than in actual life. The study's authors expressed concern that this provided TV viewers with implicit—and misleading—justification for police actions that amounted to "racism, discrimination or profiling."

==== Targeting the poor ====
The show has been criticized for its predominant focus on criminal activities among the poor. Critics of this aspect of the show say it unfairly presents the poor as responsible for most crime in society while ignoring the "white-collar crimes" that are typical of the more wealthy. Controversial documentary filmmaker Michael Moore raises this tenet in an interview with a former associate producer of Cops, Richard Herlan, in Moore's 2002 movie Bowling for Columbine.

Herlan's response to Moore was that television is primarily a visual medium, requiring regular footage on a weekly basis to sustain a show, and police officers "busting in" on an office where identity theft papers are being created or other high-level crime rings are operating does not happen very often. It is therefore not likely to be recorded and thus not shown. The low-level crime featured on the show happens every day, providing large quantities of material suitable for taping.

=== Influence on viewers ===
A 2001 study of 117 Justice Studies students at Arizona State University—a cross-section sample proportionally representative of the genders and races of all justice studies students at ASU—found various correlations between students' race and gender and their attitudes towards representative episodes of Cops. The study found that students were drawn to the violence in the program. It also found that students interpreted Cops scenes as valid and informative representations of the genders and races different from their own—eliminating the need to learn about them through direct personal contact.

=== Rejections by police departments ===
In 2005 in response to a request for Cops taping, Patrick Camden, the Chicago Police Department's deputy director of news affairs stated, "police work is not entertainment. What they do trivializes policing. We've never seriously even considered taping." The Fairfax County Police Department, located in Northern Virginia, has similarly refused to allow Cops taping since the show originally aired, as have the Washington, D.C. Police, St. Louis City Police, and the Honolulu Police Department. In addition, the show has rarely featured federal law enforcement agencies because such officers often work undercover and as a result, they are not inclined to have their work broadcast.

== Legal issues ==
=== Home intrusion ===
A 1999 United States Supreme Court decision, Wilson v. Layne, No. 98-83, (and the Court's simultaneous stance on an Appeals Court ruling in a similar case Hanlon v. Berger, No. 97-1927, and its affiliate case, CNN v. Berger, No. 97-1914) appeared to legal scholars to restrict the actions of Cops video crews, and some suggested it might even spell the end for the program.

In the Wilson case, a reporter and photographer from The Washington Post accompanied a federal marshal (Layne) and local officials when the authorities entered a home (of the Wilson family) acting on a search warrant. The Supreme Court ruled that law enforcement officers may not bring a media ride-along guest with them when entering a private home to execute a search warrant, stating that it was a violation of the Fourth Amendment rights of the people in the home to be "free from unreasonable searches and seizures," and to be "secure in their persons, houses, papers and effects." The court affirmed (or reaffirmed, in some views) the policy that officers may not bring into the home with them people whose role was not in the direct service of the purpose of the warrant. Though that court – by its own admission (stated in the majority opinion document) – was usually divided on Fourth Amendment issues, the court ruled unanimously in this case that the authorities' accommodation of the media intrusion violated the Fourth Amendment.

The court further ruled that officers violating that ruling, and allowing unnecessary parties to invade with them, were liable to those in the home they had entered and could be sued for damages. The lone dissent on that element of the case was on the question of current liability (Justice Stevens believed that the officers in that specific case were liable—but the rest of the court agreed to give them qualified immunity, because the justices believed that the Supreme Court had not yet made its position sufficiently clear on that issue; however, any subsequent violators would be held liable by the court).

The American Civil Liberties Union (ACLU), whose local affiliate represented the Wilson plaintiffs, took an even more sweeping view in favor of the plaintiffs, preferring the Fourth Amendment privacy protections against any potential First Amendment "freedom of the press" issue in that case.

In the Hanlon case, the Supreme Court further extended the protections of their Wilson ruling to include not only the house of the plaintiffs, but also the curtilage—the enclosed and concealed-from-public-view, private space around the house (commonly including yard, carport or garage).

However, Cops' executive producer John Langley said the show would continue to be produced, in the following season, in the format of "a pure ride-along show"—claiming that the show had always gotten releases from anybody shown on camera, even those people depicted under arrest. (However, Langley's statement did not indicate whether the releases were gained before or after recording and did not indicate whether some subjects had been videoed without giving their consent, and then simply not been shown—"involved"—in the resulting program.) Further, Langley noted, most of what the show depicts occurs in "the street or in cars".

=== Impact on the Dalia Dippolito case ===
Cops dedicated an entire episode ("Smooth Criminal", season 24, episode 3, originally aired September 24, 2011) to the case of escort Delilah "Dalia" Dippolito of Boynton Beach, Florida, who was convicted of solicitation to commit first-degree murder after being secretly videotaped hiring a hitman (who was actually an undercover cop) to kill her husband in 2009. At trial, her defense attorney claimed that Dippolito was tricked into signing the Cops release form. The defense attorney also claimed that her husband orchestrated the plot to get aired on Cops. In truth, Cops producers were outraged when investigators persuaded Dippolito to sign the release form before they questioned her, believing that since it was done under color of law, it would be useless. They later convinced Dippolito to sign a second waiver, saying they would give her a chance to tell her side of the story.

Ultimately, both defenses failed, and Dippolito was convicted and sentenced to 20 years in prison. However, the state's Fourth District Court of Appeal ordered a new trial in 2014, finding that the judge at the first trial erred by not doing enough to ensure that jurors were not improperly exposed to pre-trial publicity. The appeals court found that the judge should have questioned the jurors individually, rather than as a group, regarding how much they knew about the case. It also found that the judge should have dismissed the entire jury when one prospective juror revealed she had read about Dippolito's attempt at poisoning her husband. She was later released on an appeal to the Fourth Circuit Court of Appeals, pending a retrial on May 23, 2016. On August 17, 2016, the appeals court rejected her appeal without comment.

Her retrial began with jury selection on December 1, 2016. The jury was unable to reach a unanimous verdict and a mistrial was declared on December 14, 2016. A second retrial was held in June 2017, and on June 16, 2017, she was convicted again. Judge Glenn Kelley ordered her held without bail. Her defense attorneys said they would appeal the verdict. On July 21, 2017, Dippolito was sentenced to 16 years (of the maximum of 20) in prison. Florida's Fourth District Court of Appeals upheld her conviction in March 2019, the Florida Supreme Court rejected without comment her request to review the 2017 conviction, and her appeal to the US Supreme Court was refused in February 2020.

The Dippolito case has also been featured on ABC's 20/20, NBC's Dateline, CNBC's American Greed, the syndicated show distributed by Warner Bros. Domestic Television Distribution, Crime Watch Daily., and YouTube.

=== Use of Cops videos by defense attorneys ===
Cops videos have been subpoenaed and used by defense attorneys, resulting in the suppression of evidence owing to police misconduct which was revealed in the Cops videos.

In 2015, "late at night in a high-crime area," a Fort Myers, Florida police officer—accompanied by a Cops video crew—stopped and frisked a man who was wearing dark clothing and walking in the middle of the street. In an encounter that only lasted 23 seconds, the officer discovered that the suspect (who turned out to be a convicted felon) had a gun, and the suspect was arrested. In subsequent criminal proceedings, in federal district court, the defendant moved to suppress the frisk-acquired gun evidence on the ground that the officer violated the defendant's Fourth Amendment right to be free from unreasonable searches and seizures—arguing that the officer did not have "reasonable suspicion" to frisk him. More specifically, the defendant argued that the officer did not believe, reasonably, that his safety was threatened—nor the safety of others—before conducting the pat-down. The officer countered that the defendant had exhibited suspicious behavior that justified the frisk. Relying heavily on the "indisputable video evidence" that contradicted the officer's testimony on multiple points, the judge agreed with the defense and barred the evidence of the handgun. Further, the judge suggested that the officer may have altered his original report after viewing the Cops video.

At least one academic reviewer of the case described it as raising questions about how often such police actions are illegal, but unprovable—describing it as a strong justification for requiring police officers to wear body cameras.

== See also ==
- On Patrol: Live
- Law enforcement in the United States
- America's Most Wanted
