= Jail (TV series) =

American reality television series

- Created by: John Langley
- Opening theme: "Get Me Out" by Lil' Droppa
- Country of origin: United States
- Original language: English
- No. of seasons: 5
- No. of episodes: 102

Production
- Running time: 22 minutes
- Production companies: Langley Productions; 20th Century Fox Television (seasons 1 to 3)

Original release
- Network: Court TV (2005–2007); MyNetworkTV (2007–2010); Spike (2015–2017)
- Release: September 4, 2007 (Note: The airdate is the MyNetworkTV premiere; the series originally premiered on Court TV.) – July 15, 2017

Related
- Cops

Jail (stylized in all caps as JAIL, originally Inside American Jail) is an American reality television series that follows people who have been arrested for various crimes as they are booked and held in custody to await trial, release on bail, or transfer to another facility. The series was created and produced by John Langley and his son, Morgan Langley, through their Langley Productions company, who also produced shows such as Cops, Street Patrol, Video Justice, Undercover Stings & Anatomy of Crime.

== History ==
The show originally premiered on Court TV as Inside American Jail in 2005. It was repackaged for MyNetworkTV's 2007 Fall schedule as simply Jail beginning September 4, 2007 with a different theme song, "Get Me Out", performed by rapper Lil' Droppa. It was later syndicated on TruTV (A rebrand of the original Court TV) under its original name, and Spike TV, under its current title. The show ran initially for three seasons and was distributed by 20th Century Fox Television. Correctional facilities that were featured in multiple segments included the Clark County Detention Center in Las Vegas, the Multnomah County Justice Center in Portland, Oregon, the David L. Moss Criminal Justice Center in Tulsa, Oklahoma, the Orient Road Jail in Tampa, Florida and the Criminal Justice Complex in Travis County, Texas.

The booking of O. J. Simpson into the Clark County Detention Center for parole violation was featured in the show's February 12, 2008 episode.

In 2014, Spike revived the series as Jail: Las Vegas; shifting focus to the Clark County Detention Center in the eponymous city. The network ordered a 22-episode season which premiered on January 10, 2015.

In January 2016, it was announced on the show's Facebook page that Spike had renewed Jail for a fifth season. In April, the season's title was announced as Jail: Big Texas; focusing on jails in the state of Texas. The fifth and final season premiered on July 9, 2016, and ended on Saturday, July 15, 2017.

It is now shown in a binge block after On Patrol: Live on Sunday nights on Reelz

== Reappearing Corrections Personnel ==
Sergeant Catherine Gorton appeared in multiple segments involving the Multnomah County Justice Center in Portland, Oregon.

Female Officers Nicole Sittre, Jamie Joiner and Isabel Leija and male Officer Jothan Peterson appeared in multiple segments involving the Clark County Detention Center in Las Vegas.

Officers Jeff Ford, Ben Medrano and Vicente Jaramillo appeared in multiple segments involving the Criminal Justice Complex in Travis County, Texas; Officer Ford's final day and departure due to transferring to active patrol was a major part of one segment.

== Series overview ==
| Season | Episodes | Originally released | |
| Season | Episodes | First released | Last released |
|---|---|---|---|
| 1 | 24 | September 4, 2007 | May 27, 2008 |
| 2 | 18 | September 9, 2008 | July 14, 2009 |
| 3 | 18 | April 7, 2010 | September 23, 2010 |
| 4 | 22 | January 10, 2015 | November 21, 2015 |
| 5 | 20 | July 9, 2016 | July 15, 2017 |
