= List of law enforcement agencies in Georgia =

This is a list of law enforcement agencies in the U.S. state of Georgia.

According to the US Bureau of Justice Statistics' 2008 Census of State and Local Law Enforcement Agencies, the state had 628 law enforcement agencies employing 26,551 sworn police officers, about 274 for each 100,000 residents.

Georgia also hosts the FLETC, which serves as the primary training facility for numerous federal law enforcement agencies.

== State agencies ==
- Georgia Department of Juvenile Justice (DJJ)
- Georgia Bureau of Investigation (GBI)
- Georgia Department of Corrections
- Georgia Department of Community Supervision (DCS)
- Georgia Department of Human Resource and Developmental Disabilities
- Georgia Department of Natural Resources
- Georgia Department of Public Safety
  - Executive Security
  - Georgia Capitol Police
  - Georgia Commercial Vehicle Enforcement Division
  - Georgia State Patrol
- Georgia Department of Revenue
  - Georgia Alcohol and Tobacco Division
  - Office of Special Investigations
- Georgia Public Defender Council
- Georgia Department of Transportation
- Georgia Insurance and Safety Fire Commissioner
- Georgia Ports Authority Police Department
- Georgia World Congress Center
- The Medical Center, Navicent Health Police Department
- Stone Mountain Department of Public Safety

== County & city marshal agencies ==
- Cherokee County Marshal's Office
- City of Dacula Marshal’s Office
- City of Peachtree Corners Marshal’s Office
- City of Sugar Hill Marshal’s Office
- City of Tucker Marshal’s Office
- Columbia County Marshal's Office
- DeKalb County Marshal's Office
- Fayette County Marshal's Office
- Fulton County Marshal's Office
- Franklin County Marshals Office
- Hall County Marshal's Office
- Paulding County Marshal's Office
- Rabun County Marshals Office
- Richmond County Marshal's Office
- Troup County Marshal's Office
- Stephens County Marshal's Office

== County sheriff agencies ==
- Appling County Sheriff's Office
- Atkinson County Sheriff's Office
- Bacon County Sheriff's Office
- Baker County Sheriff's Office
- Baldwin County Sheriff's Office
- Banks County Sheriff's Office
- Barrow County Sheriff's Office
- Bartow County Sheriff's Office
- Ben Hill County Sheriff's Office
- Berrien County Sheriff's Office
- Bibb County Sheriff's Office
- Bleckley County Sheriff's Office
- Brantley County Sheriff's Office
- Brooks County Sheriff's Office
- Bryan County Sheriff's Office
- Bulloch County Sheriff's Office
- Burke County Sheriff's Office
- Butts County Sheriff's Office
- Calhoun County Sheriff's Office
- Camden County Sheriff's Office
- Candler County Sheriff's Office
- Carroll County Sheriff's Office
- Catoosa County Sheriff's Office
- Charlton County Sheriff's Office
- Chatham County Sheriff's Office
- Chattahoochee County Sheriff's Office
- Chattooga County Sheriff's Office
- Cherokee County Sheriff's Office
- Clarke County Sheriff's Office
- Clay County Sheriff's Office
- Clayton County Sheriff's Office
- Clinch County Sheriff's Office
- Cobb County Sheriff's Office
- Coffee County Sheriff's Office
- Colquitt County Sheriff's Office
- Columbia County Sheriff's Office
- Coweta County Sheriff's Office
- Crawford County Sheriff's Office
- Crisp County Sheriff's Office
- Dade County Sheriff's Office
- Dawson County Sheriff's Office
- Decatur County Sheriff's Office
- DeKalb County Sheriff's Office
- Dodge County Sheriff's Office
- Dooly County Sheriff's Office
- Dougherty County Sheriff's Office
- Douglas County Sheriff's Office
- Early County Sheriff's Office
- Echols County Sheriff's Office
- Effingham County Sheriff's Office
- Elbert County Sheriff's Office
- Emanuel County Sheriff's Office
- Evans County Sheriff's Office
- Fannin County Sheriff's Office
- Fayette County Sheriff's Office
- Floyd County Sheriff's Office
- Forsyth County Sheriff's Office
- Franklin County Sheriff's Office
- Fulton County Sheriff's Office
- Gilmer County Sheriff's Office
- Glascock County Sheriff's Office
- Glynn County Sheriff's Office
- Gordon County Sheriff's Office
- Grady County Sheriff's Office
- Greene County Sheriff's Office
- Gwinnett County Sheriff's Office
- Habersham County Sheriff's Office
- Hall County Sheriff's Office
- Hancock County Sheriff's Office
- Haralson County Sheriff's Office
- Harris County Sheriff's Office
- Hart County Sheriff's Office
- Heard County Sheriff's Office
- Henry County Sheriff's Office
- Houston County Sheriff's Office
- Irwin County Sheriff's Office
- Jackson County Sheriff's Office
- Jasper County Sheriff's Office
- Jeff Davis County Sheriff's Office
- Jefferson County Sheriff's Office
- Jenkins County Sheriff's Office
- Johnson County Sheriff's Office
- Jones County Sheriff's Office
- Lamar County Sheriff's Office
- Lanier County Sheriff's Office
- Laurens County Sheriff's Office
- Lee County Sheriff's Office
- Liberty County Sheriff's Office
- Lincoln County Sheriff's Office
- Long County Sheriff's Office
- Lowndes County Sheriff's Office
- Lumpkin County Sheriff's Office
- Macon County Sheriff's Office
- Madison County Sheriff's Office
- Marion County Sheriff's Office
- McDuffie County Sheriff's Office
- McIntosh County Sheriff's Office
- Meriwether County Sheriff's Office
- Miller County Sheriff's Office
- Mitchell County Sheriff's Office
- Monroe County Sheriff's Office
- Montgomery County Sheriff's Office
- Morgan County Sheriff's Office
- Murray County Sheriff's Office
- Muscogee County Sheriff's Office
- Newton County Sheriff's Office
- Oconee County Sheriff's Office
- Oglethorpe County Sheriff's Office
- Paulding County Sheriff's Office
- Peach County Sheriff's Office
- Pickens County Sheriff's Office
- Pierce County Sheriff's Office
- Pike County Sheriff's Office
- Polk County Sheriff's Office
- Pulaski County Sheriff's Office
- Putnam County Sheriff's Office
- Quitman County Sheriff's Office
- Rabun County Sheriff's Office
- Randolph County Sheriff's Office
- Richmond County Sheriff's Office
- Rockdale County Sheriff's Office
- Schley County Sheriff's Office
- Screven County Sheriff's Office
- Seminole County Sheriff's Office
- Spalding County Sheriff's Office
- Stephens County Sheriff's Office
- Stewart County Sheriff's Office
- Sumter County Sheriff's Office
- Talbot County Sheriff's Office
- Taliaferro County Sheriff's Office
- Tattnall County Sheriff's Office
- Taylor County Sheriff's Office
- Telfair County Sheriff's Office
- Terrell County Sheriff's Office
- Thomas County Sheriff's Office
- Tift County Sheriff's Office
- Toombs County Sheriff's Office
- Towns County Sheriff's Office
- Treutlen County Sheriff's Office
- Troup County Sheriff's Office
- Turner County Sheriff's Office
- Twiggs County Sheriff's Office
- Union County Sheriff's Office
- Upson County Sheriff's Office
- Walker County Sheriff's Office
- Walton County Sheriff's Office
- Ware County Sheriff's Office
- Warren County Sheriff's Office
- Washington County Sheriff's Office
- Wayne County Sheriff's Office
- Webster County Sheriff's Office
- Wheeler County Sheriff's Office
- White County Sheriff's Office
- Whitfield County Sheriff's Office
- Wilcox County Sheriff's Office
- Wilkes County Sheriff's Office
- Wilkinson County Sheriff's Office
- Worth County Sheriff's Office

== County police agencies ==
- Athens-Clarke County Police Department
- Chatham County Police Department
- Clayton County Police Department
- Cobb County Police Department
- DeKalb County Police Department
- Dougherty County Police Department
- Floyd County Police Department
- Fulton County Police Department
- Glynn County Police Department
- Gwinnett County Police Department
- Henry County Police Department
- Polk County Police Department

== City agencies ==
- Abbeville Police Department
- Acworth Police Department
- Adairsville Police Department
- Adel Police Department
- Adrian Police Department
- Alamo Police Department
- Albany Police Department
- Alma Police Department
- Alpharetta Police Department
- Alto Police Department
- Americus Police Department
- Aragon Police Department
- Arcade Police Department
- Arlington Police Department
- Ashburn Police Department
- Atlanta Police Department
- Auburn Police Department
- Austell Police Department
- Avondale Estates Police Department
- Bainbridge Police Department
- Baldwin Police Department
- Ball Ground Police Department
- Barnsville Police Department
- Bartow Police Department
- Barwick Police Department
- Baxely Police Department
- Berlin Police Department
- Blackshear Police Department
- Blakely Police Department
- Bloomingdale Police Department
- Blue Ridge Police Department
- Boston Police Department
- Bowdon Police Department
- Braselton Police Department
- Braswell Police Department
- Bremen Police Department
- Brookhaven Police Department
- Brooklet Police Department
- Broxton Police Department
- Brunswick Police Department
- Buchanan Police Department
- Buena Vista Police Department
- Butler Police Department
- Byron Police Department
- Cairo Police Department
- Calhoun Police Department
- Camilla Police Department
- Canon Police Department
- Canton Police Department
- Carrollton Police Department
- Cartersville Police Department
- Cave Spring Police Department
- Cedartown Police Department
- Centerville Police Department
- Chamblee Police Department
- Chatsworth Police Department
- Chattahoochee Hills Police Department
- Chickamauga Police Department
- Clarkesville Police Department
- Clarkston Police Department
- Claxton Police Department
- Clayton Police Department
- Cleveland Police Department
- Cochran Police Department
- Cohutta Police Department
- College Park Police Department
- Collins Police Department
- Colquitt Police Department
- Columbus Police Department
- Comer Police Department
- Commerce Police Department
- Conyers Police Department
- Cordele Police Department
- Cornelia Police Department
- Covington Police Department
- Crawfordville Police Department
- Cumming Police Department
- Cuthbert Police Department
- Dallas Police Department
- Dalton Police Department
- Dawson Police Department
- Decatur Police Department
- Demorest Police Department
- Dillard Police Department
- Doerun Police Department
- Donalsonville Police Department
- Doraville Police Department
- Douglas Police Department
- Douglasville Police Department
- Dublin Police Department
- Duluth Police Department
- Dunwoody Police Department
- East Ellijay Police Department
- East Point Police Department
- Eatonton Police Department
- Edison Police Department
- Elberton Police Department
- Ellaville Police Department
- Ellijay Police Department
- Emerson Police Department
- Eton Police Department
- Euharlee Police Department
- Fairburn Police Department
- Fairmount Police Department
- Fayetteville Police Department
- Fitzgerald Police Department
- Flowery Branch Police Department
- Folkston Police Department
- Forest Park Police Department
- Forsyth Police Department
- Fort Oglethorpe Police Department
- Fort Valley Police Department
- Franklin Police Department
- Gainesville Police Department
- Garden City Police Department
- Georgetown Police Department
- Glennville Police Department
- Gordon Police Department
- Grantville Police Department
- Greensboro Police Department
- Greenville Police Department
- Griffin Police Department
- Grovetown Police Department
- Guyton Police Department
- Hagan Police Department
- Hahira Police Department
- Hampton Police Department
- Hapeville Police Department
- Harlem Police Department
- Hartwell Police Department
- Hawkinsville Police Department
- Hazlehurst Police Department
- Helena Police Department
- Hephzibah Police Department
- Hinesville Police Department
- Hiawassse Police Department]]
- Hiram Police Department
- Hoboken Police Department
- Hogansville Police Department
- Holly Springs Police Department
- Homerville Police Department
- Hoschton Police Department
- Ideal Police Department
- Ivey Police Department
- Jackson Police Department
- Jacksonville Police Department
- Jasper Police Department
- Jefferson Police Department
- Jeffersonville Police Department
- Jesup Police Department
- Johns Creek Police Department
- Jonesboro Police Department
- Kennesaw Police Department
- Kingsland Police Department
- Kingston Police Department
- LaGrange Police Department
- Lafayette Police Department
- Lake City Police Department
- Lake Park Police Department
- Lakeland Police Department
- Lavonia Police Department
- Lawrenceville Police Department
- Leesburg Police Department
- Lenox Police Department
- Leslie Police Department
- Lilburn Police Department
- Lincolnton Police Department
- Lithonia Police Department
- Locust Grove Police Department
- Loganville Police Department
- Lookout Mountain Police Department
- Louisville Police Department
- Ludowici Police Department
- Lumber City Police Department
- Lumpkin Police Department
- Lyons Police Department
- Madison Police Department
- Manchester Police Department
- Marietta Police Department
- Marshallville Police Department
- McCaysville Police Department
- McDonough Police Department
- McRae Police Department
- Meigs Police Department
- Metter Police Department
- Midway Police Department
- Milledgeville Police Department
- Millen Police Department
- Milner Police Department
- Milton Police Department
- Monroe Police Department
- Montezuma Police Department
- Monticello Police Department
- Morrow Police Department
- Morven Police Department
- Moultrie Police Department
- Mount Vernon Police Department
- Mount Zion Police Department
- Mountain City Police Department
- Nahunta Police Department
- Nashville Police Department
- Nelson Police Department
- Newington Police Department
- Newnan Police Department
- Newton Police Department
- Nicholls Police Department
- Norcross Police Department
- Norman Park Police Department
- Oakwood Police Department
- Ocilla Police Department
- Oglethorpe Police Department
- Omega Police Department
- Oxford Police Department
- Palmetto Police Department
- Pavo Police Department
- Peachtree City Police Department
- Pearson Police Department
- Pelham Police Department
- Pembroke Police Department
- Pendergrass Police Department
- Perry Police Department
- Pine Lake Police Department
- Pine Mountain Police Department
- Pineview Police Department
- Plains Police Department
- Pooler Police Department
- Port Wentworth Police Department
- Portal Police Department
- Porterdale Police Department
- Poulan Police Department
- Powder Springs Police Department
- Quitman Police Department
- Ray City Police Department
- Reidsville Police Department
- Remerton Police Department
- Reynolds Police Department
- Rhine Police Department
- Richland Police Department
- Richmond Hill Police Department
- Rincon Police Department
- Ringgold Police Department
- Riverdale Police Department
- Rochelle Police Department
- Rockmart Police Department
- Rome Police Department
- Rossville Police Department
- Roswell Police Department
- Royston Police Department
- Sandy Springs Police Department
- Sardis Police Department
- Savannah Police Department
- Senoia Police Department
- Shiloh Police Department
- Sky Valley Police Department
- Smithville Police Department
- Smyrna Police Department
- Snellville Police Department
- Social Circle Police Department
- Soperton Police Department
- South Fulton Police Department
- Sparks Police Department
- Sparta Police Department
- Springfield Police Department
- St. Marys Police Department
- Statesboro Police Department
- Statham Police Department
- Stockbridge Police Department
- Stone Mountain Police Department
- Stonecrest Police Department
- Summerville Police Department
- Suwanee Police Department
- Sycamore Police Department
- Sylvania Police Department
- Sylvester Police Department
- Tallulah Falls Police Department
- Talbotton Police Department
- Temple Police Department
- Tennille Police Department
- Thomaston Police Department
- Thomasville Police Department
- Thomson Police Department
- Thunderbolt Police Department
- Tifton Police Department
- Toccoa Police Department
- Trenton Police Department
- Trion Police Department
- Tunnel Hill Police Department
- Twin City Police Department
- Tybee Island Police Department
- Tyrone Police Department
- Unadilla Police Department
- Union City Police Department
- Valdosta Police Department
- Varnell Police Department
- Vidalia Police Department
- Vienna Police Department
- Villa Rica Police Department
- Wadley Police Department
- Warm Springs Police Department
- Warner Robins Police Department
- Warrenton Police Department
- Warwick Police Department
- Watkinsville Police Department
- Waverly Hall Police Department
- Waycross Police Department
- Waynesboro Police Department
- West Point Police Department
- Whigham Police Department
- White Police Department
- Willacoochee Police Department
- Winder Police Department
- Winterville Police Department
- Woodbury Police Department
- Woodland Police Department
- Woodstock Police Department
- Wrens Police Department
- Wrightsville Police Department
- Zebulon Police Department

== College and university agencies ==
- Abraham Baldwin Agricultural College Police
- Atlanta Metropolitan State College Police
- Agnes Scott College Department of Public Safety
- Augusta University Police
- Berry College Police Department
- Clark Atlanta University Department of Public Safety
- Clayton State University Department of Public Safety
- Columbus Technical College Police Department
- Columbus State University Police Department
- Dalton State College Public Safety and Campus Police
- Emory University Police Department
- Georgia Gwinnett College Public Safety
- Georgia Institute of Technology Police Department
- Georgia Piedmont Technical College Police
- Georgia Southern University Police Department
- Georgia State University Police Department
- Gordon State College Public Safety
- Gwinnett Technical College Police Department
- Kennesaw State University Department of Public Safety & University Police
- Mercer University Police Department
- Morehouse College Police Department
- Middle Georgia State University Police Department
- Reinhardt University Public Safety
- Savannah State University Department of Public Safety
- Spelman College Department of Public Safety
- University of Georgia Police Department
- University of North Georgia Department of Public Safety
- University of West Georgia Police Department
- Valdosta State University Police Department
- Wiregrass Georgia Technical College Police Department

== Board of Education agencies ==
- Athens-Clarke County School Police
- Atlanta Public School Police Department
- Bibb County School Police
- Burke County Schools Campus Police
- Clayton County School Police
- Cherokee County School Police
- Cobb County School Police
- Columbia County Schools Police
- Dekalb County Schools Department of Public Safety
- Fulton County School Police
- Glynn County Schools Police
- Gwinnett County School Police
- Richmond County Board of Education Police Department
- Savannah-Chatham County School Police
- Muscogee County School District Police Department

== Transit authority police ==
- MARTA Police Department

== Other agencies ==
- Albany-Dougherty Drug Unit

== Defunct agencies ==
- Athens Police Department - merged with the Clarke County Police Department to form Athens-Clarke County Police Department in 1991, due to city-county consolidation.
- Macon Police Department - merged into the Bibb County Sheriff's Office in 2014, due to city-county consolidation.
- Oak Park Police Department - disbanded in April 2019, replaced by Emanuel County Sheriff's Office.
- Augusta Police Department merged with the Richmond County Sheriff's Office after the city and county governments consolidated in 1996. The Augusta Police Department provided all policing services within the City of Augusta while the Richmond County Sheriff's Office provided policing in the unincorporated areas of Richmond County.
- Cecil Police Department
- Clarke County Police Department - merged with the Athens Police Department to form Athens-Clarke County Police Department in 1991, due to city-county consolidation.
- Savannah-Chatham Metropolitan Police Department split in June 2017 between the Savannah Police Department and the Chatham County Police Department.
- Mt. Airy Police Department
- Ft.Gaines Police Department
- Monticello Police Department
- Resaca Police Department
- Darien Police Department
- Varnell Police Department
- Luthersville Police Department
- Union Point Police Department - disbanded in 2019, replaced by Greene County Sheriff's Office.
- Washington Police Department - disbanded in 2014, replaced by Wilkes County Sheriff's Office.
