= Anatomy of Crime =

American documentary television series

- Genre: Documentary
- Narrated by: Phil Crowley
- Country of origin: United States
- Original language: English
- No. of seasons: 2
- No. of episodes: 26

Production
- Executive producer: John Langley
- Running time: 1 hour
- Production company: Langley Productions

Original release
- Network: Court TV (now truTV)
- Release: January 17, 2000 – March 5, 2002

Anatomy of Crime is an American television series that aired on the Court TV (now truTV) network. The show first aired on January 17, 2000, and ran for two seasons, ending on March 5, 2002, with a total of twenty-six episodes, thirteen per season. The show was a series of one-hour documentaries that took viewers onto the streets and behind the scenes of crime. The series included footage from the police and the courts, covering everything from high-speed police chases and sting operations to sex trafficking and the impact of the media’s coverage. Each episode showcased a particular aspect of crime, and the issues and controversies surrounding it, including the perspectives of the country's foremost sociologists, psychologists and representatives of leading organizations in each area.

The show was produced by John Langley and his production company, Langley Productions. The episodes originally appeared irregularly as part of Court TV's signature crime series, Crime Stories. The series was narrated by Phil Crowley, known as being the narrator of Shark Tank.

Some of the content that aired in Anatomy of Crime was occasionally graphic for television. Some of the episodes that aired featured filmed murders that weren't censored. A number of these filmed murders included: Gary Plauché killing pedophile Jeff Doucet, Emilio Nuñez murdering his ex-wife Maritza Martin at a cemetery and the murder of Lea Mek, which was a gang related shooting between the Asian Boyz gang and the Wah Ching gang at a pool hall. All of these cases were filmed murders. None of this footage was censored and was still aired on television, despite the graphic nature of this footage. The video of Plauché that aired on Anatomy of Crime has been uploaded to YouTube and has received over 19 million views.

In Europe, the show was aired on Reality TV (now known as CBS Reality) from 2002 until 2005.

The show was also aired on Bravo in the United Kingdom.

== See also ==
- Cops
- Jail
- Most Shocking
- Video Justice
