= Stephen Chao =

American media executive

- Born: 1955 or 1956 (age 70–71); Ann Arbor, Michigan, U.S.
- Occupations: Internet entrepreneur; television producer; media executive

Stephen Chao (born 1955 or 1956) is an American internet entrepreneur, television producer, and media executive. He has worked as the president of the Fox Broadcasting Company, an independent television producer, president of USA Network, and co-founder of WonderHowTo.com.

== Early life and education ==
Stephen Chao was born in 1955 or 1956 to a Chinese American family, and raised in Ann Arbor, Michigan, moving to New Hampshire when he was eight years old. His maternal grandfather was a prominent official in pre-revolutionary China, once serving as the nation's economic minister to the United States. Chao is the nephew of Zao Wou Ki, a well-known Chinese impressionist painter.

Chao attended Fay School and then the Phillips Exeter Academy in Exeter, New Hampshire. He attended Harvard University, where he majored in classical studies in 1977. He later went on to earn an MBA from Harvard Business School in 1981.

== Career ==
=== National Enquirer ===
Between Harvard degrees, Chao co-wrote a Fodor's travel guide for Turkey, shoveled manure in France, and reported for the National Enquirer. He broke the story of O. J. Simpson's budding romance with Nicole Brown and tracked UFO sightings throughout South America for three months.

=== Fox Television ===
Upon graduation, Chao developed an interest in movies. Multiple rejections by the studios led him to New York, working in finance for movie producer Dino De Laurentiis. In 1983, Chao was hired as the Vice President of Acquisitions and Corporate Development for Rupert Murdoch's News Corporation. Two years later, Murdoch purchased the 20th Century Fox film company. Looking to expand the studio into television, he asked Chao to become a part of the creative team for the nascent Fox Television network, which was formerly operated by MetroMedia.

Chao's new position was under Fox President Barry Diller. His duties were to develop innovative, low-cost shows for the owned and operated station group. The most talked about controversy surrounding the two individuals occurred when Diller became so enraged with Chao that he hurled a 3/4-inch videocassette tape across the room, denting the wall. Chao framed the dent, convincing Diller years later to autograph it. Despite their conflicts, the controversial 'reality' formats they launched remained on the network for more than two decades.

Chao's first success was a concept that had been in his head for years after seeing the "Most Wanted" poster in the post office. Chao's original pitch was to marry High Noon with the 10 o'clock news. The concept he labeled "Electronic Lynching" became the television show America's Most Wanted. The following year in 1987, Chao met John Langley who pitched a concept of following beat cops around Broward County, Florida. This show became Cops.

Chao was promoted to president of Fox Television Stations in 1992. In June 1992, ten weeks after taking position as president, Chao spoke at a management conference in Snowmass Village, Colorado, for Fox executives, board members and world dignitaries, including Rupert Murdoch and wife Anna Murdoch, and former United States Secretary of Defense (and future Vice President) Dick Cheney and wife Lynne Cheney. He spoke on "The Threat to Democratic Capitalism Posed by Modern Culture". Strongly emphasising that American television programs tend to be less critical of violence than nudity and sexuality, Chao hired local waiter-model Marco Iacovelli to strip naked during his speech to illustrate his point about censorship – perhaps, nudity was less anti-social as opposed to violence and murder. Not at all amused, Murdoch fired Chao immediately afterwards.

=== McDonald's ===
After being fired, Chao took the opportunity to work at a McDonald's restaurant in Redondo Beach. For six weeks, he flipped burgers, manned the fryer and cleaned the dairy machine, claiming it was the hardest job he ever had.

=== Production work ===
In 1993, Chao formed his own production company, Stephen Chao Incorporated, creating and producing programs for ABC, CBS, NBC, Columbia TriStar Television, Universal Television and Nickelodeon. In partnership with Venezuelan media company, Cisneros Television Group, Chao launched multiple channels, including Playboy TV Latin America and the 24-hour animation channel, Locomotion. Chao also produced David Blaine's first television special, Street Magic.

=== USA Network ===
In February 1998, Barry Diller purchased USA Network and the Sci Fi Channel from Universal Studios, hiring Chao in April as president of programming and marketing, working with such shows as the WWF, La Femme Nikita, Highlander: The Series, Baywatch and the Jerry Springer Show. He was also responsible for the dramedy Monk. At the time he paid a record amount to buy the script from ABC, which had placed the project in turnaround. On March 23, 2000, Chao was promoted to president of USA Cable, where he supervised all cable services. During his tenure, USA Network aired the second most watched original mini-series in basic cable history, Attila, and the hit original movies All-American Girl: The Mary Kay LeTourneau Story and Cabin by the Lake. During Chao's tenure, the SciFi Channel emerged as the largest provider of event mini-series in primetime launching the six-hour mini-series, Frank Herbert's Dune, Steven Spielberg's 20-hour mini-series Taken and Crossing Over with John Edward. Chao resigned as president of USA Cable on November 5, 2001.

=== WonderHowTo ===
In 2006, Chao and Mike Goedecke founded WonderHowTo.com in Santa Monica, California. With backing from Cambridge, Massachusetts-based General Catalyst Partners, WonderHowTo.com launched in January 2008. As of January 2018, WonderHowTo had more than 13 million monthly uniques.
