= Tarik Shah =

African American Muslim jazz bassist

Tarik Ibn Osman Shah
- Born: Tarik X Ibn Edward Jenkins; January 24, 1963 (age 63); New York City, New York, US
- Occupation: Jazz musician
- Known for: Career jazz bassist and sideman with Betty Carter and Duke Ellington Band; Sentenced to 15 years in prison after FBI sting for allegedly making an oath to support to al-Qaeda

Tarik Shah (January 24, 1963) is an African American Muslim with a career as a professional jazz musician. As the sole student of Slam Stewart, Shah began playing the upright bass at age 12 and went on to play with Betty Carter, Ahmad Jamal, Abbey Lincoln and Art Taylor among others. He is a composer, a jazz educator, and lyricist. An expert in martial arts, Mr. Shah was arrested in May 2005 at the age of 42 in New York City, accused and eventually charged with providing aid for terrorist activity based on evidence from an FBI sting. He initially pled not guilty to all charges. After 31 months of solitary confinement, he was convinced a fair trial was unlikely given the Islamophobia following 9-11. He pleaded guilty and was sentenced to 15 years in prison.

According to the complaint, both also made a formal oath of loyalty, called a bayat, to al-Qaeda in a meeting with an undercover F.B.I. agent that was secretly recorded. An indictment handed up by a federal grand jury Monday accused the men of conspiring to provide material support for terrorism, specifically for al-Qaeda. It was less than a page long and added no details.

Mr. Shah's case is represented as an example of the U.S. government's use of agent provocateurs who entrap or set up "innocent or unaware Muslims who had no interest in terrorism" targeting individuals for "preemptive prosecution." They hung out at mosques and bookstores frequented by faithful Muslims to develop rapport leading to friendship. They offered money "to anyone who will join them in jihad."

In 2007, Reuters reported that Shah pleaded guilty to "one count of conspiring to support al Qaeda. In exchange, prosecutors dropped one of the terrorism charges against him."

Two undercover FBI agents (a.k.a. informants) were involved in Shah's entrapment case. Yemeni informant Mohamed Alanssi targeted Shah on December 1, 2001, months after 9-11, at Farhane’s Islamic bookstore in New York City. Theodore Shelby, an ex-convict and former Black Panther using the name Saeed, "was sent by the government to approach Mr. Shah under the guise of seeking bass lessons." Saeed became the subject of the 2015 film (T)ERROR, winner of a Sundance Special Jury Prize for Breakout First Feature Film in 2015, which won an Emmy Award for Outstanding Investigative Documentary in 2017. It is the only documentary to capture an active, FBI undercover sting. Shah's case is offered as previous case.

== Life and work ==
Shah began learning to play double bass at age twelve and went on to study with Slam Stewart.

His father, Edward Jenkins Jr., nicknamed Dyson, was known as Lieutenant Edward 15X in Malcolm X’s Temple No. 7 (now the Masjid Malcolm Shabazz) in Harlem, which had been a Nation of Islam mosque until the death of its founder, Elijah Muhammad, in 1975.

In 1984, Shah toured across Europe with Betty Carter and worked with Ahmad Jamal, Abbey Lincoln, and Rahn Burton after his return. He later played with the Duke Ellington Orchestra alongside Red Rodney, Sir Roland Hanna, Harold Vick, and Dr. Lonnie Smith. Shah also worked with Vanessa Rubin, the World Saxophone Quartet, and Hamiet Bluiett. In 1992, he was invited to play with the Duke Ellington Orchestra for the inaugural ball of President Bill Clinton. Shah’s older brother, Antoine Dowdell, also musically gifted, worked as a music teacher and jazz pianist.

Shah's other passion is martial arts, which he taught to children, police and corrections officers, and the community as a method of self-defense via his Expansion of Knowledge School of Martial Arts in Harlem. He attained the level of Master in Vee Arnis Jitsu, a style of Filipino martial arts, and Sanuces Ryu Jujutsu, a style of American Jiu Jitsu.

== Targeting by the FBI ==
Shah was arrested by the FBI in a sting operation that began in 2001.

Shah and his youngest sister were named by Malcolm X and raised as Sunni Muslims in Temple No. 7––perhaps one of the reasons Shah was later targeted by the FBI, accused of providing aid to al-Qaeda, "even though no actual terrorist contact ever took place."

He pleaded guilty in 2007 to one count of conspiring to provide aid to a known foreign terrorist organization, namely al-Qaeda. Shah was released from prison after 13 years in March 2018. Project SALAM describes his case as an example of preemptive prosecution.

== Arrest and guilty plea ==
Although both Alanssi and Shelby were active as informants and overlapped in Shah’s case over a four-year period from 2001 to 2005, neither could get Shah to commit any crime. Finally in 2005, Shah was arrested by the FBI on two charges of conspiracy to provide material support to a known foreign terrorist organization after Ali Soufan (founder of the multi-million-dollar Soufan Group, an international security firm), who at the time was the undercover FBI agent posing as an Al-Qaeda recruiter, urged Shah to agree to provide knife-fighting training to Al-Qaeda members, and urged Sabir to agree to provide medical aid to them. Soufan was brought in as the “closer” so the FBI could finally bring a concrete charge against Shah. Violation of Title VIII of the 2001 USA PATRIOT Act was the basis of the charge, since specific “training” is included under its definition of “material support or resources,” and this was the reason Soufan’s request to Shah was so specific.

At that time, Shah was making child support payments but had arrears. In 2000, his passport was suspended due to the amount of arrears, thus making him unable to perform in Europe and receive that income. By 2004 he still had some arrears, which were used to constantly threaten his freedom; he would literally be called to Family Court every three months with a demand to pay $2,000 over and above the regular payments, or be threatened with jail. By 2005 he desperately needed the promised cash. The New York Times wrote that “[t]he government has acknowledged that neither Mr. Shah, nor the three others accused in the case...were on the verge of any violent act.”

Shah was then held for 31 months in solitary confinement at the Metropolitan Correctional Center (MCC) in New York from 2005 until 2007.

Shah pleaded guilty in April 2007 to one count of conspiracy to provide aid to a known foreign terrorist organization. His maximum sentence was fifteen years for that single charge.

Shah, his family, and his supporters continue to claim that he was entrapped and never actually intended to join or support al-Qaeda, and that his conversations with the provocateurs and with Soufan were free speech utterances, fully protected by the Constitution. The case immediately raised controversy regarding federal law enforcement's use of paid informants.

Abdulrahman Farhane pleaded guilty to conspiracy to provide material support for terrorism and was sentenced to thirteen years; Mahmud Faruq Brent also pleaded guilty and received fifteen years for his attendance at the training camp. Dr. Rafiq Sabir, who pleaded not guilty and went to trial, was convicted and sentenced to thirty years.

Shah served his sentence in the medium- and then low-security Federal Correctional Institution at Petersburg, Virginia, and was released in March 2018 to a federal halfway house in Albany, New York. In June 2018 he was freed, with three years’ supervised release.

== (T)ERROR documentary ==
Theodore Shelby (aka Saeed “Shariff” Torres) is the main subject of (T)ERROR, and he speaks about the Tarik Shah case and how he betrayed his friend and teacher. The background of the case is also documented. The film’s emotional climax comes when Torres is browsing Facebook while he awaits a reply on his friend request to Akili [Khalifah Al-Akili, the current target].

(T)ERROR premiered at the 2015 Sundance Film Festival, where it won a Special Jury Prize for Break Out First Feature. It was nominated for the International Documentary Association ABC News VideoSource Award, and co-directors Cabral and Sutcliffe received the Emerging Documentary Filmmakers Award. (T)ERROR was named by Newsweek as one of the best documentaries of 2015; it aired on PBS in 2016, and won an Emmy award in 2017 for Outstanding Investigative Documentary. It is available on Netflix.

== Professional credits: Tarik Shah ==
Performed with various artists and bands: Claudio Roditi, Phyllis Hyman, Red Rodney, Melvin Sparks, Tom Browne, Sir Roland Hanna, Jimmy Madison, Ralph Moore, Ellis Marsalis Jr., Barry Harris, Richard Williams, Ahmad Jamal, Benny Green, Walter Bishop Jr., Willis Gatortail Jackson, Roland Prince, Bobby Watson, Steve Turre, Harold Vick, Lenny White, Rahn Burton, Dr. Lonnie Smith, Gregory Porter, Pharoah Sanders, Betty Carter, Ahmad Jamal, Abbey Lincoln, the Duke Ellington Orchestra, Vanessa Rubin, World Saxophone Quartet, Hamiet Bluiett, Gloria Lynne, Dakota Staton, Irene Reid, June April, Rodney Jones, Bobby Forrester, Fontella Bass, George Braith, Bill Henderson, Leon Thomas, Nat Dixon.

== Performance highlights ==
- September 1989–August 1992, and January 1993: Duke Ellington Orchestra, inaugural ball for President Bill Clinton
- September 1987–August 1989: Gloria Lynne
- January 1987–September 1987: Dakota Staton
- June 1984–December 1986: toured with Betty Carter

== Recordings ==
- Irene Reid, Thanks to You, 2004
- June April, Jazz Hymns, 2004
- Irene Reid, Movin’ Out (with Rodney Jones, Bobby Forrester), 2003
- Various artists, Sing Me a Song of Jazz, 1997
- Abbey Lincoln, You and I, 1997
- World Saxophone Quartet with Fontella Bass, Breath of Life, 1994
- Vanessa Rubin, Pastiche, 1993
- George Braith, Double Your Pleasure—Live at the University of the Street, 1992
- Jazz Pizzazz II, In a Sentimental Mood, 1992
- Abbey Lincoln, Abbey Sings Billie, Vols. 1–2, 1987
- Pharoah Sanders, Oh Lord, Let Me Do No Wrong (with Bill Henderson, Leon Thomas, others), 1987
- Nat Dixon, Upfront, 1984
