= Morgan Langley =

Morgan Langley may refer to:

- Morgan Langley (producer) (born 1974), American television producer
- Morgan Langley (soccer) (born 1989), American soccer player
