= Law enforcement in Georgia =

Law enforcement in Georgia may refer to:

- Law enforcement in Georgia (country)
- Law enforcement in Georgia (U.S. state)
