= Robert Fuller (FBI agent) =

Robert Fuller is an agent with the Federal Bureau of Investigation who has worked in counter-terrorism. He has questioned suspected terrorists, been a handler of informants in the U.S., and testified in both federal court and Guantanamo military commission trials.

== September 11 attacks ==
The 9/11 Commission Report stated that in late August 2001, Fuller was given a lead on Khalid al-Mihdhar, who was one of the hijackers in the September 11 attacks. Fuller was instructed to open an intelligence case and attempt to find al-Mihdhar in the U.S. within the next 30 days. It was Fuller's first counterterrorism lead. He checked New York databases and the New York hotel listed on al-Mihdhar's U.S. entry visa. When nothing showed up, Fuller sent a lead to the FBI office in Los Angeles on September 11, because al-Mihdhar had originally entered the U.S. at Los Angeles International Airport in January 2000.

A Department of Justice Office of Inspector General (OIG) report from November 2004, which was publicly released in 2006, provides a more detailed examination of Fuller's actions during his investigation. The FBI New York Field Office opened a full field intelligence investigation to locate al-Mihdhar on August 29, 2001. Fuller was given the assignment on August 30, without any particular priority, and another investigation kept him from starting until September 4. Fuller first filled out lookout request forms for the INS and U.S. Customs Service on al-Mihdhar. By September 5, Fuller had requested New York City criminal history, NCIC criminal history, credit and motor vehicle checks on al-Mihdhar and Nawaf al-Hazmi, who was mentioned as an associate in the initial lead on al-Mihdhar. Fuller stated to the OIG that he conducted a ChoicePoint search on both men. However, the FBI located records on al-Hazmi in that database soon after September 11, 2001.

The OIG report did not fault Fuller for his efforts on the investigation. Rather, it stated the New York Field Office should have assigned the search more priority and resources.

== Informant's self-immolation ==
On November 15, 2004, an informant Fuller had been working with since November 2001, Mohamed Alanssi, set himself on fire in front of the White House. Alanssi had earlier sent a note to Fuller explaining his action:

I must travel to Yemen to see my sick wife (stomac cancer) and my family before I testify at the court or any other places. Why you don't care about my life and my family's life? Once I testify my family will be killed in Yemen, me too I will be dead man. [sic]

== Guantanamo military commissions testimony ==
In 2008, Fuller testified in the Guantanamo military commission trial of Salim Hamdan. Fuller stated that it was not FBI policy at the time to give a Miranda warning about self-incrimination to terrorism suspects. "A source can be a suspect as well," Fuller testified. In March 2002, Hamdan, who had been detained in Kandahar for four months at that time, led FBI agents including Fuller on a tour of three compounds in Afghanistan owned by Osama bin Laden.

In 2009, Fuller testified in the military commission trial of Omar Khadr. Fuller recounted that he interrogated Khadr at Bagram Airbase on October 7, 2002, three months after Khadr was captured. Fuller's report of the interview, written right after it, was introduced as evidence in the trial. The report stated that Khadr took several minutes to identify Maher Arar from a photograph. It also stated that Khadr thought he saw Arar at a Kabul, Afghanistan safe house in September and October 2001. The day after the interrogation, October 8, 2002, Arar, who had been in detention at J.F.K. airport for the past 12 days, was extraordinarily rendered to Syria.

== 2009 Bronx terrorism plot ==
Fuller was the FBI handler of the informant Shahed Hussain, who conspired with James Cromitie to attempt an attack on two synagogues in the Bronx in 2009. Officially, the FBI authorized Hussain to offer US$5,000 to each man participating in the plot but how much money they believed they were doing it for remains unclear. Cromitie, along with three other defendants, was convicted and sentenced to 25 years in prison. Fuller testified at the trial that the informant, Shahed Hussain, made twelve trips to a mosque in Newburgh, New York, "to attempt to interact with other individuals in other F.B.I. counterterrorism operations," and to keep his ear open for "radical Islamic thoughts." Hussain was paid $44,000 for expenses and $53,000 for his services over a three-year period.

Fuller repeatedly told Hussain to encourage Cromitie to buy an illegal gun. An email Fuller wrote suggested the reason he kept suggesting this was to have a criminal charge versus Cromitie "in our back pocket if things went south." A different email from Fuller to officials at Stewart Airport, another potential target of the plot, stated that Cromitie would be casing the airport but that he posed no danger without help from Hussain.

On June 29, 2011, US District Judge Colleen McMahon sentenced Cromitie to 25 years in prison but pointed out that the FBI played a key role in the situation. She says: "It created acts of terrorism out of his fantasies of bravado and bigotry, and then made those fantasies come true." And added: "Only the government could have made a terrorist out of Mr. Cromitie, whose buffoonery is positively Shakespearean in scope." Shahed Hussain became a much used FBI informant after his work with Fuller in this case.

In July 2023, McMahon ordered the release of Onta Williams, Laguerre Payen and David Williams, ruling that the FBI had employed unscrupulous methods to manipulate them into committing illegal acts, including using Hussain, whom McMahon described as "unsavory."
