= Malcolm Barbour =

American television producer

- Occupation: Television producer
- Years active: 1983–1994

Malcolm Barbour is an American former television producer and the co-creator and former executive producer of the television program Cops (alongside John Langley). Prior to Cops, Barbour worked with Langley on Who Murdered JFK, Cocaine Blues and American Vice: The Doping of a Nation. Besides Cops, Barbour and Langley produced a television series for Fox that was made as a response to the success of CBS' Rescue 911, called Code 3, which was hosted by Gil Gerard and aired from 1992 to 1993. He stopped being a producer in 1994.

In 2003, a Golden Palm Star on the Palm Springs, California, Walk of Stars was dedicated to him.
