= Video Justice =

- Genre: Crime/Reality
- Created by: John Langley
- Country of origin: United States
- Original language: English
- No. of seasons: 2

Production
- Running time: 30 minutes

Original release
- Network: Court TV
- Release: 2006 – 2007

Related
- Video Justice; Crime Caught on Tape

Video Justice is a reality television primetime program (also known as a documentary) produced by John Langley airing on the television cable station Court TV and is part of network's Court TV RED lineup. The program focuses on criminals who were captured on camera in the act of the crime. The crimes are often "life or death" situations that may involve one of the two parties, either law enforcement or the criminals, being killed or seriously injured. It often displays pictures of the suspect in most of its footage and tells the viewer the name of that suspect who of which committed that crime and describes their punishment. The primetime shows runs for 30 minutes.

Cameras used in the footage in Video Justice include dashboard cameras, spy cameras, news cameras, and others taped by various people, sometimes including criminals themselves.

== The Show ==
The basic idea of the show is that is proves that you don't need a witness of the crime after the crime, proving that the video tells all or most of the details. as well as the officer's most powerful and essential tool within the war against crime. Most of the footage shown is actual shocking police moments, while other crimes are bizarre.

Video Justice also proves that the video camera is powerful and plays a serious role in these kinds of crimes and proves useful as evidence.

=== Show Connections ===
Some of the footage shown is the same footage seen in Most Shocking, explaining the same information, usually with clearer explanations. The suspects' mugshots shown are the same as the ones in Most Shocking, as well as some of the police that tell the stories.

== Production ==
Video Justice by John Langley...creator of COPS made its debut on Court TV in the April 26, 2006, and has returned for a second season on Court TV beginning January 19, 2007. Currently, there is no known information on future episodes and is currently on hiatus.

A Video Justice-related special known as Video Justice; Crime caught on tape which sometimes airs on Spike TV is one hour long.

In the UK, Video Justice is currently being shown on ITV4.

== See also ==
- Anatomy of Crime
- COPS
- John Langley
- Jail
- Most Shocking
