= Mohamed Alanssi =

Yemeni national

- Born: 1952 (age 73–74); Yemen
- Occupation: FBI informant
- Known for: set himself on fire in front of the White House

Mohamed Alanssi is a Yemeni national who has worked as an informant for the FBI in over 20 terrorism-related federal prosecutions, starting in November 2001. Alanssi set himself on fire in front of the White House on November 15, 2004. A note he wrote to his FBI handler at the time said he had to travel to Yemen to see his sick wife before he testified in a major terrorism prosecution in 2005. Alanssi was the sole informant in that case, which involved various counts of material support of terrorism against Mohammed Ali Hassan Al-Moayad and his assistant. At the trial, Alanssi was not called by the prosecution, but appeared as a hostile witness for Al-Moayad's defense.

== Early life ==
Alanssi was born in Yemen in 1952. He worked for a time at the U.S. Embassy in Sana'a in the mid-1970s and came to the U.S. on a tourist visa on July 23, 2001. Alanssi came to the attention of federal investigators after an arrest in October 2001 involving Yemenis sending money from the U.S. back to Yemen. He began work with his handler Robert Fuller as an FBI informant in November 2001.

== Investigation ==
Alanssi was sent by the FBI to Yemen three times in 2002 to talk to Shiek Mohammed Ali Hassan al-Moayad, who was suspected of having terrorist ties. Alanssi had previously known al-Moayad in Yemen as a neighbor and as a worshiper in al-Moayad's mosque. Alanssi convinced al-Moayad to travel to Frankfurt, Germany in January 2003 to meet a potential donor for Islamic fundamentalist causes. Alanssi bought airline tickets for Moayad and his assistant, booked them into the hotel in Frankfurt and provided about $500 for extra expenses, including visas from the German Embassy in Sana'a. During several meetings over 2 or 3 days, Alanssi served as a translator for the undercover FBI agent posing as a wealthy former Black Panther. The meeting was audio- and video-recorded by the FBI and Al-Moayad and his assistant were arrested and extradited to the U.S. to face charges. In the reporting of the arrest, Alanssi's name was leaked and appeared in the Yemeni press. He was paid around $100,000 by the FBI during 2003.

In November 2004, Alanssi contacted the Washington Post to discuss his work as an FBI informant in a series of interviews. He related to the paper that he was very unhappy with his treatment by the FBI and he was desperate to travel to Yemen to see his wife, who was sick with stomach cancer. On the morning of November 15, 2004, he informed the Post that he was going to "burn my body at unexpected place." [sic] Alanssi approached a White House guardhouse that afternoon and asked that a note be delivered to President Bush. After he was turned away, he used a lighter to set his jacket on fire. Secret Service officers wrestled him to the ground and put out the flames with fire extinguishers. Alanssi suffered severe burns over 30% of his body. A note he had earlier sent to FBI agent Fuller and the Washington Post read:

I must travel to Yemen to see my sick wife (stomac cancer) and my family before I testify at the court or any other places. Why you don't care about my life and my family's life? Once I testify my family will be killed in Yemen, me too I will be dead man. [sic]

At that time, Alanssi was the prosecution's star witness in the material support of terrorism case against Al-Moayad and his assistant, Mohammed Mohsen Yahya Zayed. Alanssi eventually testified at that trial in February 2005, although as a hostile witness for the defense. Al-Moayad was convicted of five counts of material support to a foreign terrorist organization and sentenced to 75 years. The conviction was eventually overturned in 2008.

Alanssi pleaded guilty to bank fraud charges in May 2004. He was given five years probation in April 2005. The FBI asked that he be allowed to travel overseas occasionally, to which the judge agreed. Alanssi was the key witness for an investigation that produced arrests in 2006 against four Muslim-Americans, Abdulrahman Farhane, Tarik Shah, Rafiq Sabir, and Mahmud Faruq Brent. The taped conversations between Farhane and Alanssi which formed the center of the investigation occurred in Farhane's Brooklyn bookstore in October 2001.
