= Morgan Langley (producer) =

American television producer

- Born: Morgan Nathaniel Langley; 1976 (age 49–50); Sacramento, California, United States
- Occupation: Television Producer
- Spouse: Kristen Miller (m. 2007)
- Parent(s): Maggie Foster-Langley; John Langley

Morgan Nathaniel Langley (born 1976) is an American television producer. He is currently the President of Production and Development at Langley Productions. Morgan Langley is the son of John Langley, creator of Cops, and Maggie Langley.

Langley is currently an Executive Producer on the long-running reality program Cops, currently airing its 33rd season on Fox Nation. Langley is also the Executive Producer of Jail: Las Vegas and Jail: Big Texas, which both air on Spike. Before creating both spin offs, Langley served as the Executive Producer of Jail, which aired on My Network TV and TruTV under the title Inside American Jail. Following the return of Cops in 2021 following a year-long hiatus, Langley also became the executive producer of a limited series for Fox Nation called COPS: All Access with Geraldo.

Other credits include Las Vegas Jailhouse and Vegas Strip on TruTV; Street Patrol, Video Justice, and Undercover Stings, to name a few.

Langley Races off-road cars in SCORE International, and he won the 2018 Baja 1000 in the COPS Racing #150 class one car.

== Personal life ==
He is married to actress Kristen Miller.
