= Oh Lord, Let Me Do No Wrong =

Studio album by Pharoah Sanders
- Released: 1987
- Recorded: July 13, 1987
- Genre: Jazz
- Length: 43:29
- Label: Doctor Jazz
- Producer: Bob Thiele

Pharoah Sanders chronology
Africa (1987)	Oh Lord, Let Me Do No Wrong (1987)	A Prayer Before Dawn (1987)

Oh Lord, Let Me Do No Wrong is an album led by saxophonist Pharoah Sanders, recorded in 1987 and released on Bob Thiele's Doctor Jazz Records label.

== Reception ==
Professional ratings
Review scores
Source	Rating
AllMusic	4/5 stars
The Rolling Stone Jazz & Blues Album Guide	3.5/5 stars

In his review for AllMusic, Stewart Mason commented: "Oh Lord, Let Me Do No Wrong is a mellow and peaceful set by a player who no longer needs to make noise; whether old-school fans will appreciate this is debatable."

Chris May for All About Jazz says this about Leon Thomas' contributions to the album: "Thomas is heard on three tracks: "Oh Lord, Let Me Do No Wrong," which could almost be from the Spirits Known and Unknown sessions, and "If It Wasn't For A Woman" and "Next Time You See Me," which are downhome carnal blues."

== Track listing ==
1. "Oh Lord, Let Me Do No Wrong" – 5:35
2. "Equinox" (John Coltrane) – 9:25
3. "Polka Dots and Moonbeams" – 6:11
4. "If It Wasn't for a Woman" – 4:39
5. "Clear Out of This World" – 13:45
6. "Next Time You See Me" – 3:54

== Personnel ==
- Pharoah Sanders – tenor saxophone
- Donald Smith – electric piano
- William S. Henderson III – acoustic piano
- Tarik Shah – bass
- Greg Banoy - drums
- Leon Thomas - vocals (tracks 1, 4, and 6)
