= WonderHowTo =

Instructional video guide website

Wonder How To, Inc.
- Company type: Private
- Website type: Instructional video guide
- Founded: Santa Monica, California; July 28, 2006
- Headquarters: Santa Monica, California
- Key people: Stephen Chao, Co-founder and CEO; Michael Goedecke, Co-founder and Head of Product & Technology; Bryan Crow, CTO
- Website: wonderhowto.com
- Advertising: Banner ads
- Launched: January 30, 2008
- Current status: Active

WonderHowTo is a community-developed instructional video guide website launched on January 30, 2008. WonderHowTo acts as both a directory and search engine for how-to videos on the web. The free-access website is privately owned and operated by Wonder How To, Inc.

== History ==
WonderHowTo was founded in 2006 by Stephen Chao and Michael Goedecke. Backed by Cambridge, Massachusetts-based General Catalyst Partners, WonderHowTo.com launched as the world's largest free how-to video resource with almost 90,000 entries, hitting the 100,000th mark in less than two months.

By March 2008, the site's audience had grown to 300,000 monthly unique visitors and 800,000 by July (source: Google Analytics). Partner Scripps Networks contributes instructional segments as well as handling advertising for the site.

Employing both human and automated curation, the how-to supersite aggregates and organizes links to thousands of videos featured on other popular how-to video site publishers, as well as specialized collections of how-to video from niche-targeted sites and servers worldwide. WonderHowTo is headquartered in Santa Monica, California.

== Partners ==
On October 7, 2008, WonderHowTo signed a syndication partnership deal with VideoJug. Under the terms of the agreement, VideoJug will provide the video content to the website in return for licence fees and/or a cut of ad revenues.

== WonderHowTo Network ==
As of 2020, the WonderHowTo network comprises several web properties including WonderHowTo.com, GadgetHacks.com, Next.Reality.News and Null-Byte

== See also ==
- Instructables
