= (T)error =

- Directed by: Lyric R. Cabral; David Felix Sutcliffe
- Produced by: Christopher St. John
- Starring: Khalifah Al-Akili and Saeed Torres
- Music by: Robert Miller
- Release date: October 7, 2015
- Running time: 84 minutes
- Country: United States
- Language: English

(T)error – stylized as (T)ERROR – is a 2015 American documentary film directed by Lyric R. Cabral and David Felix Sutcliffe. The film follows undercover FBI informant Saeed "Shariff" Torres as he engages in a sting operation targeting a Muslim man named Khalifah Ali Al-Akili as well as Tarik Shah. The film won the Special Jury Award for Breakout First Feature at the 2015 Sundance Film Festival, where it premiered.

It is the first documentary to follow an active FBI case while in progress. It is the first film for Cabral and the second for Sutcliffe. Sutcliffe said the film's intention was to show informants and their targets, and focus on the "decisions, tactics and objectives of counterterrorism cases."

The film aired on US television on the PBS series Independent Lens. The film was re-titled FBI Undercover when broadcast in the UK by the BBC as part of their Storyville TV series.

The story was also retold on This American Life.

== Background ==
Co-director Cabral was a student living in Harlem when her downstairs neighbor of four years, Saeed Torres, disappeared in May 2005. Cabral's investigation into his disappearance eventually became the subject of her film. Shortly before Torres' disappearance, Sutcliffe and Cabral met at an afterschool arts program, where one of their students, Adama Bah, a 16-year-old Muslim teenage girl was arrested by the FBI and accused of being a "potential" suicide bomber. Her arrest triggered a growing interest for both Cabral and Sutcliffe in the FBI's counterterrorism tactics, and an increasing awareness of the central role of informants in the majority of domestic terror plots.

== Reception ==
=== Critical reception ===
The film was received positively by critics. It received a 91% Fresh rating on Rotten Tomatoes based on 33 reviews. It also received a score of 73 (generally favorable) on Metacritic, based on 12 reviews. The consensus according to Rotten Tomatoes being "(T)ERROR should dishearten and disturb viewers concerned with the erosion of American civil rights – and it doesn't even hit its targets as hard as it could.".

Writing for RogerEbert.com, film critic Brian Tallerico, who gave the documentary three and a half stars out of four, says that the film is a "fascinating piece of work that approaches CITIZENFOUR in its deconstruction of governmental failure and the systems underneath the war on terror that are not only failing to keep us safe but impacting the entire world political scene."

=== Awards and nominations ===
Won

- The National Academy of Television Arts and Sciences – Emmy for Outstanding Investigative Documentary (2017)
- Sundance – Special Jury Prize for Breakout First Feature (2015)
- Full Frame Documentary Film Festival – Grand Jury Prize (2015)
- International Documentary Association – Lyric R. Cabral and David Felix Sutcliffe won Emerging Filmmaker Award (2015)

Nominated

- Independent Spirit Awards – Best Documentary (2015)
- Cinema Eye Honors – Spotlight Award (2015)
