= Mohammed Ali Hassan Al-Moayad =

Mohammed Ali Hassan al-Moayad
- Born: May 1, 1948; Yemen
- Died: August 12, 2017 (aged 69)
- Occupation: Imam
- Known for: Alleged financing of terrorism

Sheik Mohammed Ali Hassan Al-Moayad (Arabic: محمد علي حسن المؤيد; May 1, 1948 – August 12, 2017) was a Yemeni cleric who was convicted in 2005 on U.S. federal charges of conspiring to provide material support and resources to Hamas and Al-Qaeda. His conviction was overturned in the Court of Appeals in 2008. He then pleaded guilty to conspiring to raise money for Hamas, was sentenced to time served, and deported to Yemen. Prior to his arrest, he was the imam of the main mosque in Sanaa and a high-ranking member of Yemen's opposition Al-Islah party.

Al-Moayad claims that he was Osama bin Laden's spiritual advisor in the 1980s, but he says that their relationship ended after the Soviets withdrew from Afghanistan. Bin Laden reportedly issued a fatwa calling for al-Moayad's death after the cleric publicly criticized him.

In 2003, Al-Moayad traveled to Germany to meet a Federal Bureau of Investigation (FBI) informant, Mohamed Alanssi, and an FBI undercover agent posing as a wealthy former Black Panther. The FBI video-recorded al-Moayad at a Frankfurt hotel promising to funnel over $2 million to Hamas. He was then arrested by German police at the request of the FBI. Al-Moayad's assistant Mohammed Mohsen Yahya Zayed was also arrested. They appealed to the Federal Constitutional Court of Germany against extradition. This appeal was rejected, as the court found that the U.S. had given Germany assurances that the suspects would not face a military court or any other special tribunal. They were therefore turned over to U.S. custody, and taken to New York City to face trial. It was decided to try them at the U.S. District Court in Brooklyn, because al-Moayad was alleged to have done some of his fundraising at a Brooklyn mosque. At the time of the arrests, John Ashcroft said that al-Moayad had admitted to funding Osama bin Laden with $20 million prior to the September 11 attacks.

In 2005, al-Moayad was convicted along with Zayed of various counts of providing material support to Al Qaeda and Hamas. The judge in the case was Sterling Johnson Jr. During the trial, Mohammed Alanssi, one of the FBI informants in Germany, served as a hostile witness to the defense. The trial proceedings included viewing of the incriminating tape made by the informants.

The prosecution also presented testimony by a survivor of a 2002 bus suicide bombing in Tel Aviv. The prosecution said that this testimony was intended to show the jury that Hamas is a terrorist organization, even though the defense did not contest this. In addition, the prosecution was allowed to present testimony from Yahya Goba, a member of the Buffalo Six, despite defense objections. Goba gave testimony as to the significance of al-Moayad's name appearing on an Al-Qaeda training camp form as recommending the applicant. The form was found in Afghanistan by U.S. soldiers. Goba also described the camp's training in explosives and weapons and the visits by bin Laden. He summarized a speech bin Laden gave which talked about the importance of "performing jihad."

Judge Johnson called the video-recording "chilling," and said that al-Moayad "did provide material support, money, weapons and recruits to Hamas and al Qaeda." Al-Moayad received a 75-year sentence (15 years for each of 5 counts) and a $1.25 million fine. The conviction was hailed as a significant blow to al-Qaeda by the Bush Administration.

In October 2008, the Court of Appeals overturned the conviction, ruling that the jury had been prejudiced by inflammatory testimony about unrelated terrorism links. Specifically, the testimony of both Goba and the victim of the Palestinian attack in Tel Aviv was deemed inadmissible. The 68-page ruling was written by Circuit Judge Barrington Daniels Parker Jr. The case was turned back to the District Court, along with an unusual stipulation that the retrial must have a different judge.

In 2009, al-Moayad pleaded guilty to one count of conspiring to raise money for Hamas. He was sentenced to time served and was deported. He arrived in Yemen in August with Zayed, where they were greeted by thousands of supporters. That same day they were congratulated in person by then-President Ali Abdullah Saleh.
