= Georgia Alcohol and Tobacco Division =

State agency in Georgia

The Alcohol and Tobacco Division is a division of the Georgia Department of Revenue, in the United States. It ensures that the State collects all taxes and fees, administered by the Department, which are owed by individuals and businesses subject to Georgia's alcoholic beverage, tobacco and coin-operated amusement machine laws and regulations. It provides assistance to taxpayers, license and permit applicants and businesses in the areas of alcohol, tobacco, and coin-operated amusement machines.

The Division ensures compliance with Georgia laws and regulations relating to voluntary compliance and enforcement of beverage alcohol and tobacco products, coin-operated amusement machines, motor fuel tax, motor carriers and motor vehicle registration. It also provides assistance to federal, other state and local governments and their law enforcement agencies. The Enforcement Section is charged with preventing the illegal production, importation, transportation, possession and sale of alcoholic beverage products, the transportation and sale of untaxed cigars and cigarettes, the use of unlicensed and unstamped coin-operated amusement machines and the sale and furnishing of alcoholic beverages to underage persons. The Audit and Regulatory Section performs audits of alcohol and tobacco wholesalers, and reports to determine tax liability and collects deficiencies.
