= Santa Rosa Police Department =

Law enforcement agency in Santa Rosa, California

- Abbreviation: SRPD

Agency overview
- Formed: April 1, 1867
- Employees: 256
- Legal personality: Governmental: Government agency

Jurisdictional structure
- Operations jurisdiction: Santa Rosa, USA
- Area: 41.50 sq mi
- Population: 178,000
- General nature: Local civilian police

Operational structure
- Headquarters: 965 Sonoma Avenue, Santa Rosa, CA 95404
- Agency executive: John Cregan, Chief

Facilities
- Stations: 1
- Lockups: 1

The Santa Rosa Police Department is the police force for Santa Rosa, California. The department has 256 sworn and civilian employees. The department is divided into a Field Services Division patrolling nine beats with support from a Special Services Division and a Technical Services Division. The department emphasizes community outreach programs to focus law enforcement services on community priorities.

== Organization ==
The Police Department is divided into three separate divisions

The Field Services Division includes all uniformed personnel such as patrol officers, patrol sergeants and lieutenants, Traffic Team, Downtown Enforcement Team, Special Enforcement Team, Field Evidence Technicians, and Community Services Officers. Nine numbered beats patrol the city.

- Beat 1 is northwestern Santa Rosa between the SMART tracks and the 101 freeway
- Beat 2 is Santa Rosa north of College Avenue and east of the 101 freeway
- Beat 3 is northwestern Santa Rosa north of College Avenue and west of the SMART tracks
- Beat 4 is northeastern Santa Rosa north of California State Route 12
- Beat 5 is western Santa Rosa between College Avenue and Sebastopol Road
- Beat 6 is eastern Santa Rosa south of California State Route 12
- Beat 7 is southwestern Santa Rosa south of Sebastopol Road and west of the 101 freeway
- Beat 8 is southeastern Santa Rosa east of the 101 freeway
- Beat 9 is downtown Santa Rosa

A Special Services Division includes detective teams (Violent Crimes, Gang Crimes Team, Domestic Violence Sexual Assault, Property Crimes, and Narcotics), Professional Standards Team, Hiring and Recruitment, and the Training Team.

The Technical Services Division includes the 911 Dispatch Center, Records Bureau, Crime Analysts, and the IT Team.

The Department has a community outreach program including community police experience training programs in English and in Spanish for interested members of the public and a youth community police experience training for interested high school students. The Chief of Police meets monthly with a Community Advisory Team of volunteers to facilitate and enhance communication between the Police Department and the community and inform the Police Chief of the community’s concerns and views regarding public safety to guide the focus of law enforcement services.

== History ==
The Santa Rosa Police Department was formed on April 1, 1867, one year before the incorporation of the City of Santa Rosa in 1868. In its first 100 years, the department grew from three "Town Marshals" to a staff of 55.

The following years produced an impressive organizational growth to the present day staff of 256. According to the demographic information provided by the California Department of Finance, from 2020 through 2025, the city's population has stabilized around 178,000.

Mothers Against Drunk Driving named the Santa Rosa Police Department the 2024 MADD Outstanding Agency of the Year for their enforcement efforts to prevent driving under the influence (DUI). In 2025 two Santa Rosa Police Department officers received the Centurion Award for making over 100 DUI arrests in a single year; and officer Chase McIntyre was nominated as Outstanding Rookie of the Year for making 68 DUI arrests during his first year of service.

=== Famous Cases ===
==== Lynchings ====
On May 9, 1878, Charles Henley, a 57-year-old farmer from Windsor, California, murdered his neighbor James Rowland after Rowland complained about Henley's pigs being loose on his property. Henley left Rowland's body to be eaten by his hogs, and the next day Henley turned himself in to the authorities. In the early morning hours of June 9, groups of men started to appear on the streets of Santa Rosa. One group went to the home of jailer Sylvester Wilson, where the men held his family hostage while Wilson was taken to the jail to hand over the keys to the lynch mob. Wilson and night guard R. Dryer were taken in a wagon and dropped off on the outskirts of Santa Rosa. Henley was found hanging from a tree not far from where the two men were released. The lynchers were never caught.

On December 5, 1920, Santa Rosa native Terry Fitts, along with San Francisco hoodlums "Spanish" Charley Valento and George Boyd, got into a shootout with a joint police squad from Santa Rosa, Sonoma County and the San Francisco Police department. The outlaws were wanted in San Francisco for the gang rape of a young woman. Fitts, Valento, and Boyd were at the home of an acquaintance, looking for food or money, when the police caught up with them. As the police crashed through the door of the home, Boyd shot and killed San Francisco police detective Lester Dohrman, Sergeant Miles Jackson, and Sonoma County Sheriff Jim Petray. The three wanted men were then quickly taken into custody. On December 10, 1920, a group of men entered the jail without a struggle, took the men out of their cell, and drove them to Santa Rosa Rural Cemetery. They were strung up by their necks in their long underwear and left to swing in the wind. The inquest's verdict was "death by persons unknown". It was rumored that the lynch mob was made up of men from nearby Healdsburg, California who were friends of Sheriff Petray.

==== Murder of Police Chief O'Neal ====
On July 15, 1935, disgruntled rancher and hunting guide Al Chamberlain dressed up in his finest cowboy clothes, drove to his former ranch outside of Santa Rosa and shot John McCabe, the new owner of the property, leaving him for dead. He survived. Chamberlain drove his beat-up car to Santa Rosa where he walked into the Santa Rosa police station and killed Chief Charlie O'Neal. Chamberlain had owned a livery stable in downtown Santa Rosa for years, but was forced to vacate his business through eminent domain when the city wanted to build their new city hall on Chamberlain's property. Chief O'Neal personally signed and served Chamberlain his notice to vacate. Financially broken, Chamberlain had to sell his beloved ranch on Saint Helena Road. O'Neal continued to harass Chamberlain to the point where he got the prosecutor to sentence Chamberlain to thirty days and a hundred-dollar fine for accidentally hitting a pedestrian. He was never the same man after he was released from jail. After shooting O'Neal, Chamberlain calmly walked down the street with a pistol in each hand, searching for Sonoma County Sheriff Harry Patteson. Patteson heard the gunshots and bumped into Chamberlain, who did not recognize him. Patteson disarmed and tackled Chamberlain, with the help of Joe Schurman and Burnette Dibble. He was sentenced to life in prison and died in San Quentin Prison.

==== Death of Andy Lopez ====
On October 22, 2013, 13-year-old Andy Lopez was shot and killed by Sonoma County sheriff's deputy Erick Gelhaus in the Moorland neighborhood of unincorporated Santa Rosa. Lopez was walking to his friend's house while carrying an airsoft gun replica of an AK-47. Gelhaus mistook the airsoft gun for a real rifle, and demanded that Lopez drop the weapon. Gelhaus then fired eight shots at Lopez, killing him. The shooting prompted protests in Santa Rosa, which attracted protesters from around Northern California. The Lopez family filed a lawsuit at the District Court in November, claiming that Gelhaus shot Lopez "without reasonable cause." They amended their lawsuit in January 2014, claiming that the Sheriff's office had long known that Gelhaus had a "propensity ... to recklessly draw his firearm and to use excessive force". The deputy's attorney argued that Gelhaus "absolutely believed" that the gun was real and that his life was in danger. You may be wondering why this is listed on the Santa Rosa Police Department page, as there is no relation in the above paragraph. The extent of SRPD's involvement was to investigate the incident.

== Budget ==
The budget for Fiscal year 2024-2025 was $79.7 Million dollars, comprising more than one third of the city's entire General Fund Budget.
