= John Langley =

American television and film director (1943–2021)

John Q Langley
- Born: John Russell Langley; June 1, 1943; Oklahoma City, Oklahoma, U.S.
- Died: June 26, 2021 (aged 78); Ensenada, Baja California, Mexico
- Occupations: Film director, television director, writer, television producer, off-road racer
- Years active: 1989–2021
- Known for: Cops (1989–present)
- Spouse: Maggie Langley
- Children: Morgan

John Russell Langley (June 1, 1943 – June 26, 2021) was an American television and film director, writer, and producer who was best known as the creator and executive producer of the television show Cops, which premiered on Fox in March 1989.

Prior to that, he was among the reality television pioneers as a producer of various two-hour event specials in syndicated television markets during the 1980s. Langley was often credited as being the "Godfather of Reality Television" with the appearance of Cops in 1989.

== Biography ==
=== Personal ===
Langley was born in Oklahoma City, but moved to Los Angeles as a small child. He was the son of Lurleen (Fox), a homemaker, and John Russell Langley, an oil wildcatter. Langley was a Morse code intercept operator in the Army Security Agency, an intelligence unit of the United States Army from 1961 to 1963, in Panama. He received a Bachelor of Arts degree in English from California State University, Dominguez Hills in 1971, and later a Master's degree in literature and composition.

Langley briefly participated in the doctorate of philosophy program in University of California, Irvine.

On December 2, 1986, Langley made his entrance into the world of reality television when a show which he produced, American Vice: The Doping of a Nation, showed three live drug arrests on primetime television for the first time. In order to make the show, Langley had convinced officials of the Broward County, Florida Sheriff's Department to allow cameras to accompany them on a previously scheduled drug bust. The success of the show proved to be the grand inspiration for Langley's signature work.

=== Cops ===
In 1988, Langley, with Malcolm Barbour serving as his production partner, formed Barbour/Langley Productions. He first produced Who Murdered JFK in collaboration with Saban Productions in 1988.

Langley's most notable achievement perhaps is the innovation of the cinéma vérité signature style of the award-winning Cops television program, which notably influenced TV advertising and news reporting, not to mention other network and syndicated programming.

Langley recalled that the Cops concept was initially difficult to sell to television network executives, and that all were "very negative" to his fundamental idea. He was finally able to win a meeting with Barry Diller, then head of Fox to explain his concept. He recalled in a 2013 interview:

'You've gotta have a narrator,' Diller said. And I said no. 'Whattayamean no?' Diller said. And I said that defies the whole purpose of doing it the way I'm talking about doing it. 'All right then,' Diller said. 'You gotta do some reenactments.' And I said no. 'Whattayamean no?' And I kept doing this with him because my feeling was I'm not gonna sell out my idea anymore. To hell with 'em all.

Ultimately a pilot episode was ordered, which garnered mixed reviews among Fox executives owing to the overly graphic nature of a murder scene which was featured. After viewing the pilot, the network's executives, along with News Corporation chairman Rupert Murdoch, began to debate the future of the show with Langley in attendance. Langley later recalled:

And this guy came in the room and sat in the corner. He looked like an accountant. [After further debate] the guy in the corner says, 'Order four of them. Try four [episodes].' And I look over and Diller says, 'Ah, you hush, I'm talking right now.' And I thought, 'Well, who's that guy, the accountant?' Well, obviously, it turned out that he wasn't the accountant. It was Rupert Murdoch, but [in those days] nobody knew who Rupert Murdoch was or what he looked like.

Cops was cancelled by Fox in 2013, but was picked up by Spike (now Paramount Network), where the show returned with its 32nd season while continuing its national run on syndicated and cable TV, thus becoming one of the longest running reality series in television history. The show has broken records for primetime network television with over 1000 episodes aired (as of 2017).

In June 2020, Paramount Network pulled the program from its schedule in response to national protests against the murder of George Floyd while being arrested by officers of the Minneapolis Police Department, and announced its cancellation days later. The program's last episode on the network aired on May 11, 2020. Production recommenced in September of that year for international markets, and in September 2021, it was announced that Fox Nation (Fox Corporation's new streaming service) picked up the show, with the 33rd season premiering on October 1, 2021.

In 1992, Barbour/Langley Productions moved to a new location in Orlando, Florida. Barbour retired in 1994 and the production company became simply Langley Productions.

=== Other work ===
Among Langley's credits are Who Murdered JFK, an examination of the John F. Kennedy assassination; and Terrorism: Target U.S.A. (1989), an early warning of the coming problems with terrorism in the United States as well as across the world. Langley's credits also include various network, cable and syndicated TV shows, including the television series Code 3, Anatomy of Crime, Video Justice, and Cop Files. He, along with Barbour, produced a television series for Fox made as a response to the success of Rescue 911, called Code 3, which was hosted by Gil Gerard, and aired from 1992 to 1993.

He also produced various independent films and directed film and documentary film, including the Dolph Lundgren workout video Maximum Potential, Dogwatch, Tiptoes and Wildside.

Langley also produced a television series called Inside American Jail for TruTV with his son Morgan. In an innovative move, the show was also sold to and airs as Jail on MyNetworkTV. Jail is also an unscripted series following corrections officers as they process suspects through city and county jails. Morgan Langley is credited as co-creator of the new series, which incorporates the video verite style of Cops. Father and son then produced Las Vegas Jailhouse as yet another examination of crime and the justice system in America.

Langley was a producer of Antoine Fuqua's Brooklyn's Finest, which was screened at the Sundance Film Festival in January 2009.

During the 2010/2011 television season, Langley was also responsible for the following series running concurrently: Cops, Jail, Las Vegas Jailhouse, Street Patrol and Vegas Strip. More recent TV shows include Road Warriors on Spike.

Langley also produced Undercover Stings for Spike.

Langley also started his own off-road race team known as COPS racing team. Langley was active in Southern Nevada Off Road Enthusiasts and SCORE International. He won the 2017 Baja 1000 in the Spec Trophy Truck class.

== Death ==
On June 26, 2021, Langley died of a heart attack while competing in the coast-to-coast Ensenada to San Felipe 250 off-road race in Baja California, Mexico. He was 78 years old.

The 35th season premiere of Cops, released on April 7, 2023, was dedicated to him.

== Awards ==
Langley won various awards for the Cops television series, including the American Television Award and four Emmy Award nominations. Other awards include the Cine Golden Eagle and Houston International Film Festival winner for the documentary Cocaine Blues. His DVDs, moreover, have won various awards for greatest sales records in the mid 1990s when he founded Real Entertainment and pioneered the reality DVD market with VHS releases of multiple reality titles like Cops: Too Hot for TV and The Amazing Video Collection. The term Too Hot for TV was coined and trademarked by Langley during this period and was used in marketing until he sold the company.

== Hollywood Walk of Fame ==
Langley was awarded a star on the Hollywood Walk of Fame in February 2011 for his contributions to television.
