= Gwinnett County Police Department =

- Abbreviation: GCPD
- Motto: Integrity, Courtesy, Pride and Professional Growth

Agency overview
- Employees: 1,258 (2024)

Jurisdictional structure
- Operations jurisdiction: Georgia, United States
- Legal jurisdiction: Unincorporated areas of Gwinnett County, Georgia, and incorporated areas within eight of the 17 cities in the county (the cities of Auburn, Braselton, Duluth, Lawrenceville, Lilburn, Loganville, Norcross, Snellville and Suwanee have separate police departments)
- General nature: Local civilian police

Operational structure
- Headquarters: 800 Hi Hope Rd, Lawrenceville, Georgia
- Sworn members: 936 (2024)
- Civilians: 322 (2024)
- Agency executive: James D. McClure, Chief
- Child agency: Gwinnett County Sheriff's Office

Facilities
- Holding Facilities: Gwinnett County Jail

Website
- Official Website

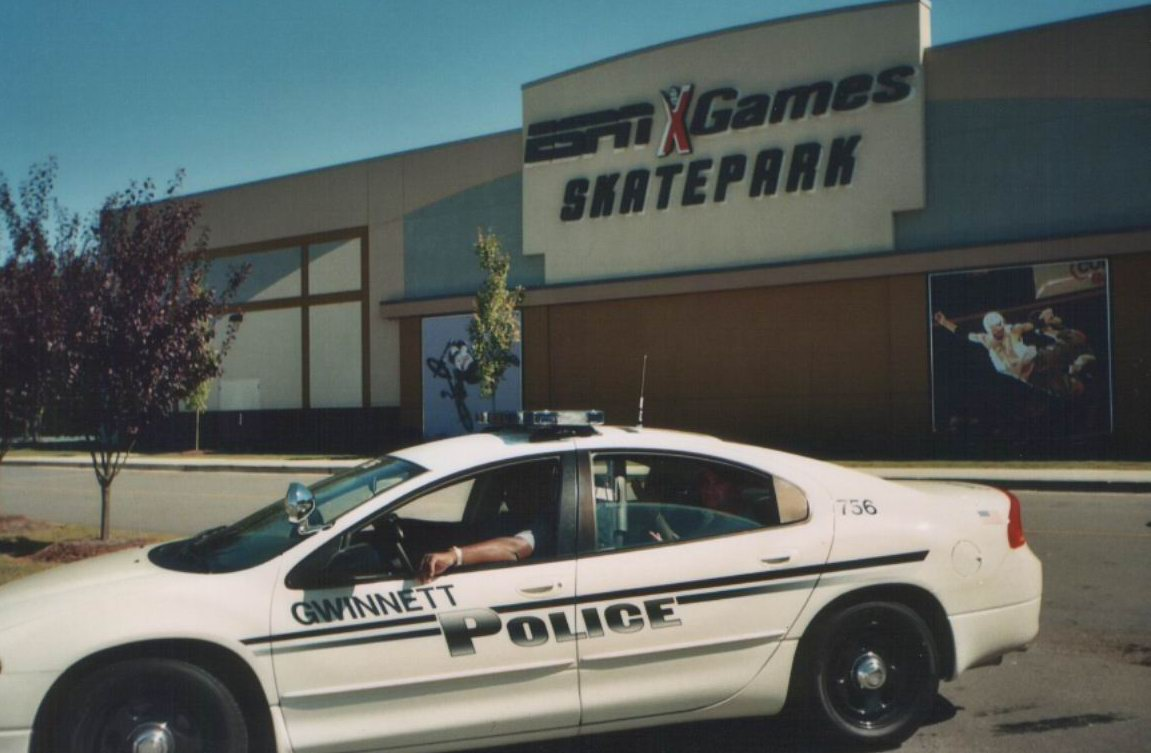
Gwinnett County police car in 2003

The Gwinnett County Police Department (GCPD) is the main law enforcement agency in Gwinnett County, Georgia, U.S. The department has about a thousand employees with 936 sworn law enforcement officers as of March 2024. The current incumbent Chief of Police is James D. McClure.

== History ==
=== Fallen officers ===
As of 2024, the department has suffered eight officers and two K9 service dogs killed throughout its history.

Fallen officers
Officer	Date of death	Cause of death
Police Officer Howard Eugene Waldrop	Saturday, July 9, 1960	Gunfire
Police Officer Ralph King Davis	Friday, April 17, 1964	Gunfire
Police Officer Jerry Reed Everett	Friday, April 17, 1964	Gunfire
Police Officer Marvin Jesse Gravitt	Friday, April 17, 1964	Gunfire
Assistant Chief of Police Hugh Dorsey Stancil	Saturday, March 23, 1968	Vehicle pursuit
Chief of Police Grady Franklin Dacus	Saturday, March 23, 1968	Vehicle pursuit
Police Officer James Christopher Magill, Sr.	Sunday, May 23, 1993	Vehicular assault
Police Officer Antwan DeArvis Toney	Saturday, October 20, 2018	Gunfire
Police Officer Pradeep Tamang	Sunday, February 1, 2026	Gunfire

Fallen K9s
K9	Date of death	Cause of death
K9 Eli	Thursday, May 23, 2019	Heatstroke
K9 Blue	Thursday, September 10, 2020	Gunfire

Three of the fallen officers were murdered on April 17, 1964 in a single attack. The department had about a dozen officers at the time. Three of them were driving home in one car, as they came upon three men who were stripping a stolen car for parts. The bodies of Officers Ralph King Davis, Jerry Reed Everett and Marvin Jesse Gravitt were found bound in their own handcuffs and shot with their own guns. The perpetrators, Venson Williams and Alec Evans were sentenced to death for the murders. Both sentences were commuted to life in 1971. Williams was released on parole in 1989. Evans died in prison in 2016, having served fifty years for the murder. The third perpetrator, Wade Truett cooperated with the government in exchange for immunity.

=== In media ===
In 2019, the department was featured on episodes of the police documentary television series The First 48.

Starting in 2022 a True Crime podcast hosted by Sean Kipe through the Imperative Entertainment podcast network, “In the Land of Lies: The Michael Chapel Story”, focuses on allegations of police corruption within the Gwinnett County Police Department and questioning if the conviction of former GCPD officer Michael Chapel for the murder of Emogene Thompson in 1993 was a set up to frame and falsely convict Chapel while protecting the real murderers.

== Organization ==
The department is organized with two bureaus and four divisions: Administrative Services, Support Operations, Criminal Investigations and Uniform Divisions.

== See also ==
- List of law enforcement agencies in Georgia
