= Key West Police Department =

Law enforcement agency for Key West, Florida

- Abbreviation: KWPD

Jurisdictional structure
- Operations jurisdiction: Key West, Florida, USA
- Area: 7.4 square miles (19 km^{2})
- Population: 23,342 (2021)
- General nature: Local civilian police

Operational structure
- Headquarters: Key West, Florida
- Agency executive: Sean T. Brandenburg, Chief of Police

Website
- Key West Police

The Key West Police Department (KWPD) is a law enforcement agency servicing a population of 25,031 and 7.243 square miles within the municipality of Key West, Florida, United States.

== History ==
Law enforcement within the city of Key West originated with the incorporation of the city in 1828 with a town Marshal. The jail was the brig of a ship docked at the city port. By the turn of the 20th century, in 1900, the KWPD had a complement of 13 sworn officers.

On March 10, 1904, Key West recorded its first officer killed in the line of duty. Policeman Clarence Till responded to a fight and was overpowered by a group of men who took his weapon. He was shot several times and died after 10 minutes.

The Police Athletic League, or PAL, was incorporated in 1910 and seeks to prevent juvenile crime by building relationships between police officers and community youth through athletics.

In 1984 the KWPD was declared a criminal enterprise and several high-ranking officers of KWPD, including Deputy Police Chief Raymond Casamayor, were arrested on federal charges of running a protection racket for cocaine smugglers.

In 2011, KWPD officer Mark Siracuse tazed a man named Matthew Murphy in an altercation on Duval Street. The resulting injury put him in a vegetative state. His family sued the city claiming that the officer did not identify himself, approached Murphy without warning, and tazed him in the back. The city settled for $850,000.

In 2013, Charles Eimers was killed in police custody. KWPD originally claimed that while fleeing from police, Eimers collapsed and was then found unconscious by officers. However, bystander video revealed that Eimers was conscious and surrendered to the police immediately before his death. After this incident, KWPD purchased one hundred body cameras and reviewed its policy on prone restraint: it now requires officers to monitor the suspect for vital signs at all times.

In 2018, KWPD officers arrested an 8-year-old boy and charged him with felony battery. They attempted to handcuff him, but his arms were too small for the restraints. The Monroe County State Attorney’s Office chose not to prosecute the case about nine months after the arrest.

In 2020, Chief Sean Brandenburg was suspended for 5 days and required to pay restitution of $681.27 after it was revealed that in 2019, on-duty officers helped him move into his new residence.

The city of Key West cross-designated all KWPD sworn officers as code compliance officers in 2020, making refusal to sign a civil citation an arrestable offense.

== Officer Deaths ==
On March 7, 1904, Officer Clarence K. Till became the first Police Officer in the Key West Police Department to ever die in the line of duty. He died after being called to a drunken disturbance call and then getting attacked by a mob of people, later being able to escape but then shot by one of the criminals he tried to arrest came out of the shadows and shot him with a gun multiple times.

On December 18, 1975, Officer Norman Alvin Drew was responding to a back-up call on a motorcycle for a fellow officer when a car failed to yield a stop sign.

On January 23, 2006, Detective John Michael Piskator was partaking in a Fitness Training with the Police Forces, Special Response Team but collapsed and suffered a fatal heart attack.

== See also ==
- List of U.S. state and local law enforcement agencies
