= Roger Graef =

American-born British filmmaker (1936–2022)

Roger Graef OBE
- Born: Roger Arthur Graef; 18 April 1936; New York City, U.S.
- Died: 2 March 2022 (aged 85) near Durweston, Dorset, England
- Occupations: Theatre director, filmmaker

Roger Arthur Graef OBE (18 April 1936 – 2 March 2022) was an American-born British documentary filmmaker and theatre director. Born in New York City, he moved to Britain in 1962, where he began a career producing documentary films investigating previously closed institutions, including Government ministries and court buildings.

== Early life ==
Graef was born in New York City on 18 April 1936. He started directing plays at Harvard University, staging the New England premiere of Virgil Thomson and Gertrude Stein's opera The Mother of Us All in 1956, and the premiere of Robert Penn Warren's Brother to Dragons in 1957.

He directed 24 plays in theatres along the East Coast, and was chosen by CBS for its new TV drama directors' program. He directed two network dramas for CBS, including The Seven who were Hanged, a one-hour special adapted and produced by Robert Herridge from the Leonid Andreyev novel of the same name.

== Career in Britain ==
Graef moved to Britain in 1962 and directed Tennessee Williams' Period of Adjustment at the Royal Court and Wyndham's Theatre in the West End of London.

His first film was One of Them is Brett for the Society of Thalidomide Children, to demonstrate to headteachers of primary schools that the physical handicaps of the children did not stop them from being active mentally. It won the Silver Dragon Prize in Kraków, Poland, and was broadcast by the BBC, CBC, and ABC Scope in the U.S., as well as being added to medical school curricula. Graef commented in a BBC interview in 2014 that "nobody had ever seen them as people, they had only seen them as cases and it entered medical school curricula immediately because doctors had never seen them at home".

Graef's film The Life and Times of John Huston, Esq for the BBC, CBC, and NET in the US, was one of the first documentary co-productions for television. He subsequently produced the 13-part series Who Is on artists, architects, writers, and composers for BBC, CBC, NET, and Bayerischer Rundfunk, also directing the episodes on Jacques Lipchitz, Pierre Boulez, Walter Gropius, and Maurice Béjart.

In 1968, he made a film called Why Save Florence? (BBC/BR/NET), about the poor state of the city's defences against flooding. His 1970 film In the Name of Allah: the life cycle of a Muslim community (filmed in Fez, Morocco) for BBC/BR/NET was the first long documentary on Islam shown in the West. Working with his collaborator cameraman Charles Stewart, Graef made the first "fly-on-the wall" purely observational series The Space between Words in 1972 for the BBC and PBS, including Politics, the first documentary filmed inside the U.S. Senate, and Diplomacy, the first unstaged film inside the United Nations.

He then made a series of films for Granada Television with unprecedented access to various institutions. Working with Norma Percy and Brian Lapping, he made the first film inside the UK Government: State of the Nation: A Law in the Making, and in 1976 the first film inside the European Union: Inside the Brussels HQ. His three-part series Decision followed top-level decision-making inside Occidental Petroleum, Hammersmith Council, and British Steel. The steel film was adapted as a short course by Harvard and London Business Schools.

His 1978 series Decision; British Communism followed the evolution of a manifesto over several years. It won the Royal Television Society Award for Best Current Affairs Documentary.

In 1973, Graef became a member of the board of the Institute of Contemporary Arts (ICA) in London, and founded and chaired its Architectural Forum. He also became a part-time tutor at the Architectural Association. In 1975, he was appointed to the Development Control Review of Planning Law, chaired by George Dobry, and he chaired the Sub-Group on Public Involvement in Planning. He promoted the early publication of planning officers' recommendations for approval or refusal of applications before the meeting, which is now standard practice. He was also on the three-man Inquiry into Control of Demolition. In 1976, he was made a member of the board of London Transport. He subsequently co-designed the London Bus Map with Andrew Holmes. His BBC film, Is this the Way to Save a City? co-directed by Mike Dibb for Omnibus, delayed the redevelopment of Cardiff. Together with Simon Jenkins, he made a film for Arena which revealed that a Grade II listed building was demolished every day during Save Britain's Heritage Year. In 2015 he was part of the four-person Royal Institute of British Architects (RIBA) Commission on the Future of Housing, chaired by John Banham. In the subsequent RIBA report Building the Homes and Communities Britain Needs he wrote the chapter on design. In 2016 he was made an Honorary Fellow of RIBA.

In 1982, Graef made an observational documentary titled Police about the Thames Valley Police. The reaction to the programme's portrayal of insensitive police handling of a rape victim changed the way in which the UK police handled rape cases. In a BBC interview in 2014, Graef said, "we showed [the film] to [the police] but they regarded themselves as being nice to her. First of all Thatcher talked about it in parliament, it was on CBS news in America and also in Sweden and other places. Our film came after three very controversial rape cases the week before and the police quietly changed the way they handled rape". He directed the films/TV specials of the first three Amnesty International comedy galas in 1976, 1977, and 1979 – the last of which was the first Secret Policeman's Ball film. In 1984 he co-produced the first Comic Relief with Richard Curtis, and Look at the State We're In (BBC), a series of short satirical films on constitutional reform, with John Cleese, Hugh Laurie, Dawn French, and Anthony Sher. In 2005 he produced Remember the Secret Policeman's Ball for BBC Arena, directed by Margy Kinmonth. In 2015 he and James Rogan made Monty Python: The Meaning of Live, for UKTV following the final stage performances at The O2 Arena with archive of their earlier stage work. In 2016 It was shown at the Tribeca and Toronto Documentary Festivals.

Graef became a UK citizen in 1995. He was a trustee and then a patron of the Koestler Trust for art in prisons, the Rehabilitation for Addicted Prisoners Trust, the Irene Taylor Trust for Music in Prisons, the Voice of the Child in Care, Who Cares? Trust and Prisoners Abroad, a charity which supports Britons imprisoned outside the UK. He was a patron of the Mulberry Bush School in Oxfordshire, the subject of Kim Longinotto's Hold Me Tight, Let Me Go for Films of Record. He was a patron of the charity Compassion In Care, which campaigns on abuse of the elderly.

As a criminologist, he made more than 30 films on police and criminal justice issues, including Police, Operation Carter, In Search of Law and Order UK (Channel 4) and In Search of Law and Order – USA (PBS and Channel 4) on positive ways to address youth offending, which influenced the National Youth Justice Board. Police 2001 (BBC) looked at how policing had changed since his 1982 series, and Panorama: Rape on Trial looked at how much had changed in the handling of rape since his 1982 film. His 1987 fiction film Closing Ranks (ITV/Zenith) about domestic violence in the police was used in training for many years. Since 1995 he has been a Visiting Fellow and then Visiting Professor at the Mannheim Centre for Criminology at the London School of Economics. Since 2001, he has been a member of the Independent Advisory Group in Race for the Metropolitan Police. He has made many films on race and policing, including Murder Blues, three films following Operation Trident on black-on-black gun crime for the BBC. For Channel Four he made Race Against Crime, and The Siege of Scotland Yard around the run-up and publication of the Macpherson Report into the murder of Stephen Lawrence (2000). For Channel Four Dispatches, he made Not Black and White on black v Asian conflicts. And Ready for A Riot on Met training for public order disturbances following the riots around the G20 summit in London. He also made Searching for Madeleine (2007) on the mistakes of the original investigation into the disappearance of Madeleine McCann in Portugal.

He was the author of Talking Blues: Police In Their Own Words (Harper Collins), Living Dangerously: young offenders in their own words (Harvill) and Why Restorative Justice? (Gulbenkian).

Graef broadcast regularly on Radio 4 and 5 and wrote for The Sunday Times, Daily Telegraph, Sunday Telegraph, Daily Mail, Mail on Sunday, The Observer and The Guardian. In 2017, he was a guest on John Lloyd's radio comedy show The Museum of Curiosity alongside Phill Jupitus and Prue Leith.

He was a founding board member of Channel Four, News International Visiting Professor of Media and Communications at Oxford University, and was on the Board of Trustees of the Media Standards Trust. He was a patron of Prisoners Abroad, a charity that supports the welfare of Britons imprisoned overseas and their families, as well as the Irene Taylor Trust for Music in Prisons.

Graef joined the charity board of Complicité theatre company in 1997. He became the chair of the board and remained a trustee of the organisation until his death in 2022.

== Films of Record ==
In 1979, Roger Graef founded Films of Record, a documentary production company that specialises in tackling difficult subjects, and securing access to previously closed institutions. Films of Record worked in association with Hatchling Productions on Cathy Henkel's feature-length documentary film The Burning Season (2008), which followed a young Australian entrepreneur to Indonesia on a mission to help stop deforestation and make money in the process. In the first months of 2010, Films of Record produced Julien Temple's Requiem for Detroit? (BBC), Ricardo Pollack's three-part series on medical ethics Great Ormond Street (TV series) (BBC), and a series on family discord, Who Needs Fathers? (BBC). Other productions include Murder Blues, following Operation Trident on black-on-black gun crime, the BAFTA-nominated Kids in Care, a Panorama Special, The Trouble with Pirates on the impact of Somali piracy; and Amnesty! When They Are All Free. Graef was Executive Producer on all these films.

The company's later output includes The Truth About Adoption, which was BAFTA and BAFTA Craft nominated in 2012, and the second series of Great Ormond Street. Also the award winning series. Films of Record is now part of factual media group Zinc Media. Graef left the company in February 2016 and founded Roger Graef Productions. He was working as Executive Producer with Rogan Productions and 72films on a number of projects in development and production.

== Death ==
Graef died from cancer at his home in the Dorset countryside, near Durweston, on 2 March 2022, aged 85.

== Awards and honours ==
In 2004, Graef was awarded a BAFTA Fellowship for lifetime achievement, the first documentary maker to receive this status. He was appointed an OBE in the 2006 New Year Honours list for services to film-making and broadcasting. In 2013, BAFTA held a tribute evening to celebrate Graef's 50th year as a filmmaker. He was awarded the 2014 Lifetime Achievement Award at Sheffield Doc/Fest. In 2015 he was given a Lifetime Achievement Award by the Aldeburgh Documentary Festival.

- Requiem for Detroit? directed by Julien Temple for Films of Record won the Grierson Award for Best Historical Documentary in 2010.
- Feltham Sings, directed by Brian Hill and produced by Graef, won a BAFTA Award for Best Documentary in 2004.
- Hold Me Tight Let Me Go, directed by Kim Longinotto and produced by Roger Graef and Richard Klein, won Best Documentary at BRITDOC, Grand Jury Prize at IDFA, Amsterdam, Best Documentary Bird's Eye Festival, Best Documentary Britspotting, Berlin
- Malaria: Fever Road – One World Awards: Best Documentary
- Race for the Beach – CBA-Amnesty International Award for Human Rights Programme
- Kids in Care was nominated for Best Current Affairs at the 2011 BAFTA Awards; and won a Royal Television Society Award
- The Truth About Adoption was nominated for Best Current Affairs at the 2012 BAFTA Awards. The director, Clare Johns, was also nominated for Best Newcomer at the 2012 BAFTA Craft Awards
- A Lifetime Achievement Award at Sheffield Doc/Fest in June 2014.
