= Police (TV series) =

1982 documentary series by BBC Television

- Genre: Documentary
- Directed by: Charles Stewart
- Country of origin: United Kingdom
- Original language: English
- No. of series: 1
- No. of episodes: 12

Production
- Producer: Roger Graef

Original release
- Network: BBC One
- Release: 4 January – 22 March 1982

Police is a BBC Television documentary television series about Thames Valley Police, first broadcast in twelve episodes from 4 January to 22 March 1982. Produced by Roger Graef and directed by Charles Stewart, it won the BAFTA award for best factual series.

Graef was given access to film Thames Valley Police by the Chief Constable, Peter Imbert, who went on to be Commissioner of the Metropolitan Police. Filming was based in Reading police station and took place in 1980 and early 1981.

The series had a significant impact on debate about the role of the police. The most influential episode was the third, A Complaint of Rape, in which a woman who said she had been raped by three men was treated harshly and dismissively by three male police officers. In a BBC interview in 2014 Roger Graef said, " We showed it (the film) to them (the police) but they regarded themselves as being nice to her. First of all Thatcher talked about it in parliament, it was on CBS news in America and also in Sweden and other places. Our film came after three very controversial rape cases the week before and the police quietly changed the way they handled rape." The public reaction led to changes in the way in which the UK police handled rape cases. In less than a year, Reading police station had a new dedicated rape squad consisting of five female police officers.

A five-part series titled Police: Operation Carter, also produced by Roger Graef, was transmitted from 16 September to 21 October 1982. Seven of the episodes were repeated on BBC Two from 19 May to 30 June 1984. A follow-up programme titled Police 2001 was shown on 25 November 2001, looking at how the police service had evolved since the original series; and in 2006, an episode of Panorama looked at the A Complaint of Rape episode and asked if anything had changed.
