= Savannah-Chatham Metropolitan Police Department =

Former municipal police in Chatham County, Georgia, USA

Agency overview
- Formed: 2005
- Preceding agencies: Savannah Police Department; Chatham County Police Department
- Dissolved: June 2017

Jurisdictional structure
- Operations jurisdiction: United States
- Legal jurisdiction: Chatham County, Georgia

The Savannah-Chatham Metropolitan Police Department (SCMPD) was the defunct primary law enforcement agency for the city of Savannah, Georgia, United States, as well Chatham County, Georgia. It was founded in 2005 when the Savannah Police Department and the Chatham County Police Department merged.

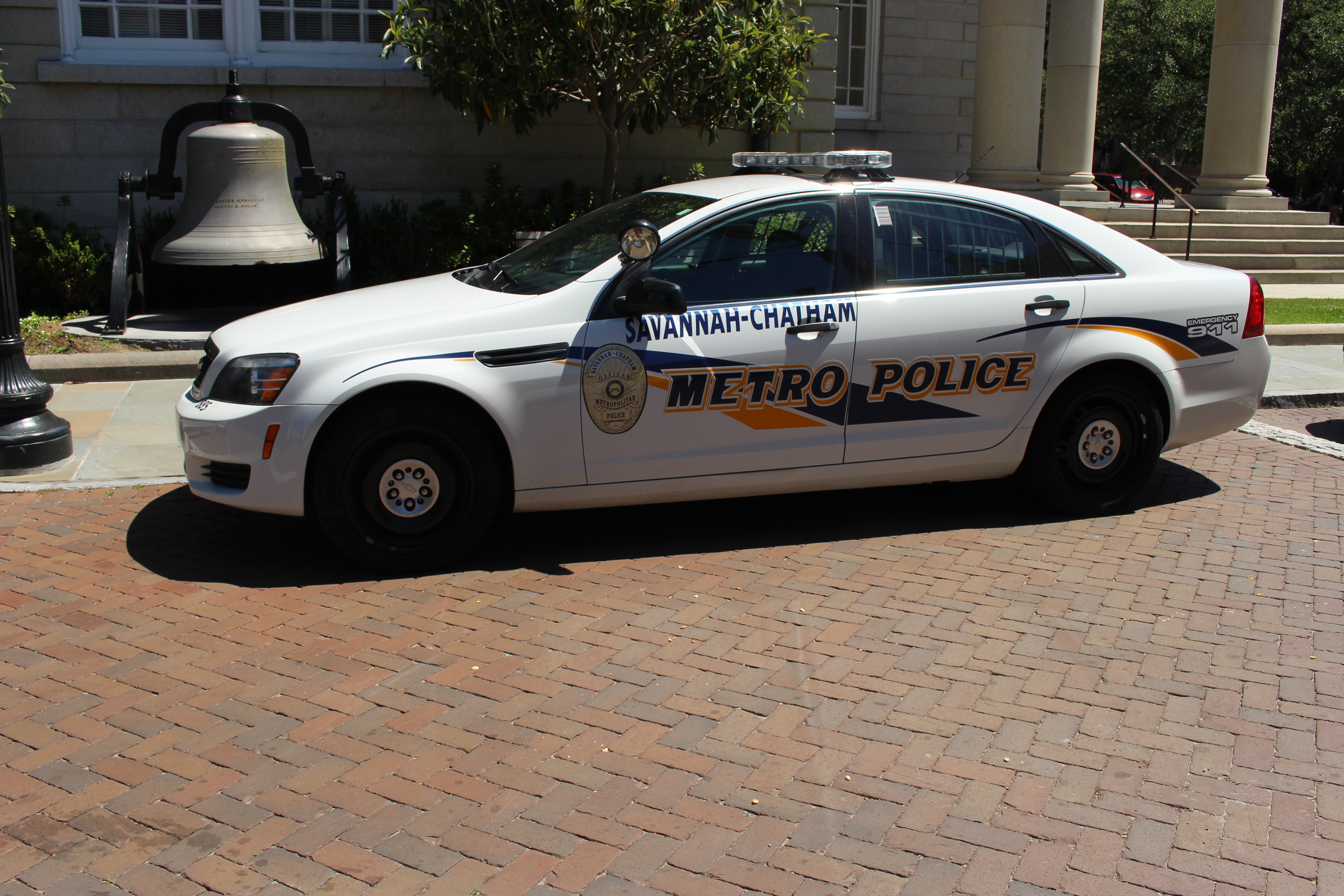
Image of a SCMPD Patrol Cruiser.

In June 2017, the Savannah-Chatham Metro Police Department split after 12 years for being unable to resolve issues of poor response times, the legality of the Mayor of Savannah naming the police chief, and other issues. Now the city is policed by the Savannah Police Department and the unincorporated parts of Chatham County (starting on Feb 1, 2018) by the newly formed Chatham County Police Department. The Chatham County Sheriff's Department will aid the County Police until they are fully staffed.

The new chief of the Chatham County Police Department is Jeffrey M. Hadley. On August 27, 2018, Roy W. Minter, Jr. became the Chief of Police of the Savannah Police Department.

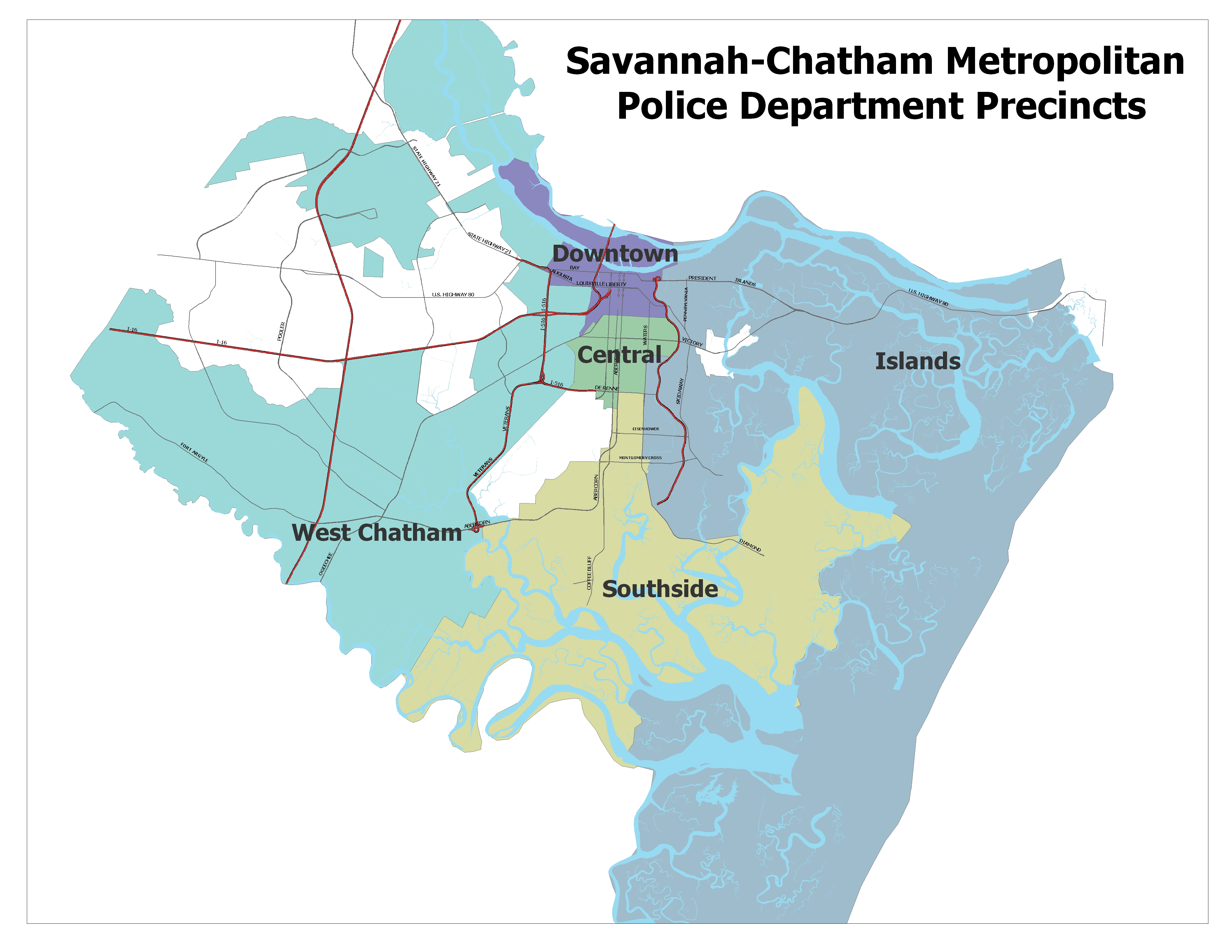
Map of SCMPD Precincts.
