= Undercover Stings =

- Genre: Documentary
- Country of origin: United States
- No. of seasons: 1
- No. of episodes: 10

Production
- Executive producers: Chris Rantamaki; John Langley; Morgan Langley
- Running time: 20 to 22 minutes (excluding commercials)
- Production company: Langley Productions

Original release
- Network: Spike
- Release: May 7 – July 16, 2012

Undercover Stings is an American reality documentary television series on Spike. The series debuted on May 7, 2012.

== Premise ==
The series follows undercover police officers as they work on assigned cases. Each episodes reveals the planning, set-up, and execution of the plan. The series follows police units in cities such as Kansas City, Missouri, Palm Beach, Florida, New Orleans, Louisiana, Savannah, Georgia and Las Vegas, Nevada.

== Episodes ==
No.	Title	Original release date	U.S. viewers (millions)
1	"The Preacher and the Prostitute"	May 7, 2012	0.511
A priest is arrested for involvement with an internet prostitution sting, men attempting to steal copper pipes are apprehended and a man is caught dealing drugs.
2	"Crack and Car Jack"	May 7, 2012	0.524
Officers are able to intervene a drug sting, a hooker gets caught and arrested and a car thief gives information to officers as a plea deal.
3	"Drug Dealer Under My Bed"	May 14, 2012	0.401
Undercover officers invite a drug dealer to a fake bachelorette party and arrest him, a crack dealer flees from officers but is later caught in a weird hiding place and a criminal uses the restroom in his pants while under arrest.
4	"Oxy Mom"	May 21, 2012	0.647
A pregnant woman is arrested while trying to purchase Oxycodone and officers jump out of a moving van in order to pursue drug dealers.
5	"The Takedown Clown"	May 28, 2012	0.411
Hookers are arrested by an undercover cop in a clown suit and officers follow a stolen truck.
6	"Win a Prize, Go to Jail"	June 11, 2012	0.703
Cops are able to shut down a meth laboratory in a trailer and set up a drug bust inside a hotel room.
7	"Gun Runner"	June 18, 2012	0.807
Cops catch a young couple who are trading stolen guns for pills to create Meth and a crack dealer gives up his secret supply stash.
8	"Pawn Busters"	June 25, 2012	0.490
Meth users who are going to local drug stores and buying ingredients are busted and a pawnshop owner is arrested for buying stolen gold.
9	"Car Wash Crack Sales"	July 9, 2012	0.653
Cops stake out a business which turns out to be fake and an undercover cop mistakenly trusts a known drug dealer.
10	"Secret Weed Safe"	July 16, 2012	0.437
Cops get a drug user to direct them to a supply location with marijuana and an officer arrests a hustler in Las Vegas.
