= Daytime television in the United States =

Daytime television is the general term for television programs produced for broadcast during the daytime hours on weekdays; programs broadcast in the daypart historically (though not necessarily exclusively) have been programmed to appeal to a female audience.

In the United States, the daytime slot follows the early morning daypart (typically dedicated mainly to local and network morning shows), usually running Monday through Friday from 10:00 a.m. to 4:30 p.m. local time. (A broader definition of the daypart includes the designated "early morning," "early access" and "prime access" dayparts as well as weekends, encompassing programs aired between 6:00 a.m. and 8:00 p.m. ET/PT; under the alternate definition, daytime programming ends one hour early outside of the Eastern and Pacific Time Zones due to regional adjustments to the start of network prime time schedules.)

This article focuses on television programs and genres common in American daytime television, primarily focusing on programs typically shown on national over-the-air television networks and in syndication.

== Types of daytime programming ==
There are several different genres or formats of daytime programming that are produced. Most of these shows can be produced on a low budget, as these shows have to be able to make at least five new episodes per week (sometimes more) for most of the year. Most daytime shows are syndicated, meaning local stations buy the rights to air them.

=== Court shows ===
There are currently many different court shows produced in United States daytime television. Most of these shows usually deal with one, sometimes two small claims court cases per episode. Other shows deal with family law or reenactments of more serious cases. The cases are typically a form of binding arbitration between two litigating parties who agree to drop their conventional lawsuit to appear on television (with any monetary payments from a decision being paid out of a fund set up by the production company). They are generally unscripted, feature actual litigants with cases pending in court, and decisions are handed down by real judges or attorneys. All of the following court shows are syndicated. Court shows usually occupy the morning and late-afternoon time slots.

==== Current ====
- Adam's Law
- America's Court with Judge Ross
- Cutlers Court
- Divorce Court
- Equal Justice with Judge Eboni K. Williams
- Hot Bench
- Judy Justice
- Justice for All with Judge Cristina Perez
- Justice for the People with Judge Milian
- Justice with Judge Mablean
- Mathis Court with Judge Mathis
- Supreme Justice with Judge Karen
- Tribunal Justice
- The Verdict with Judge Hatchett
- We the People with Judge Lauren Lake

=== Soap operas ===
A staple of daytime television since the 1950s, soap operas continue to be among the most popular programs among daytime audiences. Soap operas are dramatic serials that tell ongoing stories of the day-to-day lives of large casts of characters, each still having its own identity. The term "soap opera" is somewhat of a misnomer, dating to the early days of radio and television when purveyors of detergents and soaps such as Procter & Gamble, Colgate-Palmolive and Unilever generally sponsored, financed and produced these shows individually. Soap operas usually occupy the afternoon time slots in daytime programming (especially from 1 p.m. to 4 p.m. local time).

==== Current ====
Broadcast

- Beyond the Gates (CBS; 2025–)
- The Bold and the Beautiful (CBS; 1987–)
- General Hospital (ABC; 1963–)
- The Young and the Restless (CBS; 1973–)

Streaming

- Days of Our Lives (NBC; 1965–2022, Peacock; 2022–)

=== Game shows ===
Game shows, another long-time mainstay of daytime television, involve real people playing a game, or a series of games, as contestants like the title suggests, with the ultimate goal of winning a prize (usually a large amount of money or an expensive luxury item, such as a new car or a trip).

The period from 1972 to 1985 could be considered the "Golden Age of Game Shows," as all three of the major broadcast networks carried several game shows during their daytime lineups, usually occupying the mid/late-morning and late-afternoon time slots. ABC Daytime ended their block in 1985 (with occasional stand-alone game shows such as Bargain Hunters in 1987 and Match Game in 1990 airing in the years that followed) followed by NBC Daytime in 1991 (with a brief revival in 1993) and CBS Daytime in 1993. CBS still carries two daytime game shows, the long-running The Price Is Right and a revival of Let's Make a Deal. CBS currently allows both daytime game shows to be arranged as a two-hour block by affiliates (10AM ET) if preferred instead of bookending the schedule (11 AM and 3 PM ET).

Of the current daytime game shows, The Price Is Right began as part of CBS's daytime game show block in 1972 and is the only show to have aired continuously on daytime network television since the end of that era. Family Feud, Jeopardy! and Wheel of Fortune all transitioned from network daytime shows to syndication, while Who Wants to Be a Millionaire (which ended in 2019 after a total of 20 seasons) was a network prime time program that transitioned to syndication, then transitioned back to network prime time in 2020. Both current CBS Daytime game shows began as 30-minute game shows that transitioned into one-hour formats (Price in 1975 and Deal in 2009).

==== Current ====
Network

Daytime

- Let's Make a Deal (CBS; 2009–, aired in various forms on NBC, ABC and syndication from 1963 to 1981, 1984 to 1986, 1990, and 2003)
- The Price Is Right (CBS; 1972–, aired on NBC from 1956 to 1963 and ABC from 1963 to 1965)

Primetime

- The $100,000 Pyramid – originally aired on CBS and ABC from 1973 to 1981 as The $10,000/$20,000 Pyramid; aired on CBS from 1982 to 1988 as The (New) $25,000 Pyramid; primetime revival began airing on ABC in 2016
- Hollywood Squares – originally aired in various form on NBC and syndication from 1966 to 1981, 1986 to 1989 and 1998 to 2004; primetime revival began airing on CBS in 2025
- Name That Tune - originally aired in various forms on NBC, CBS and syndication from 1952 to 1959, 1970 to 1971, 1974 to 1981, and 1984 to 1985; primetime revival began airing on Fox in 2021
- Password - originally aired on CBS from 1961 to 1967, then on ABC from 1971 to 1975; primetime revival began airing on NBC in 2022
- Press Your Luck – originally aired on CBS from 1983 to 1986; primetime revival began airing on ABC in 2019
- The Floor – debuted on Fox in 2024

Late Night

- Funny You Should Ask – Aired in syndication from 2017 to 2026, moved to CBS late nights at 12:35 a.m. in May 2026.

Syndicated

- Family Feud (formerly on ABC from 1976 to 1985, and on CBS from 1988 to 1993)
- Flip Side
- Jeopardy! (formerly on NBC from 1964 to 1975 and 1978 to 1979)
- The Perfect Line
- Scrabble – originally aired on NBC from 1984 to 1990, and briefly revived in 1993; primetime revival began airing on The CW in 2024, with a daily syndicated version debuting in 2026.
- Scrambled Up
- Trivial Pursuit – originally aired on The Family Channel (now Freeform) from 1993 to 1994; primetime revival began airing on The CW in 2024, with a daily syndicated version debuting in 2026.
- 25 Words or Less
- Wheel of Fortune (formerly on NBC from 1975 to 1989 and 1991, and on CBS from 1989 to 1991)

=== News programs ===
Daytime network news programs, due to their longer timeslots, provide more in-depth coverage of news and current events than evening newscasts, which are 30-minute programs. These programs may also feature cooking segments, health/lifestyle information, celebrity guests, and concert performances by popular music acts (usually on Friday). Most morning shows follow a basic format of hard news and interviews with newsmakers and correspondents in the first half-hour, true crime stories in the second, and lighter fare such as celebrity and lifestyle stories in the second hour (with the concert, if any, closing out the show in the last half-hour). Network morning news programs usually occupy 7:00 to 9:00 a.m. time slot, with local affiliates usually having their own morning newscasts preceding them, as well as brief updates (on most affiliates) towards the end of each half-hour during the network show.

In the 2020s, ABC and NBC began to schedule national midday newscasts in the early-afternoon, both of which produced by their respective news division's streaming news channels. Amid the COVID-19 pandemic, ABC replaced GMA3: Strahan, Sara & Keke—a spin-off of its morning show Good Morning America hosted by Sara Haines and Michael Strahan—in March 2020 by Pandemic: What You Need to Know, an ABC News Live-produced newscast covering the pandemic's early stages. While billed as a temporary replacement, ABC quietly cancelled Strahan & Sara (which had later added Keke Palmer) and made the What You Need to Know format permanent under the GMA3 branding, becoming more of a general newscast. By 2025, the series had been reintegrated into GMA's main production. In 2022, NBC moved Days of Our Lives exclusively to its streaming platform Peacock in favor of NBC News Daily—a block of rolling news coverage produced by NBC News Now.

==== Current ====
Mornings

- Good Morning America (ABC; 1975–)
- The Today Show (NBC; 1952–)
- CBS Mornings (CBS; 2021–)

Midday

- GMA3 (ABC)
- NBC News Daily (NBC)

Early evenings

- ABC World News Tonight
- CBS Evening News
- NBC Nightly News

=== Newsmagazines ===
In their earliest incarnations in the 1970s and 1980s, half-hour newsmagazines originally featured general news, human interest stories, and lighthearted celebrity news. In the late 1980s and through the 1990s and 2000s, programs became more focused on celebrity gossip/tabloid coverage, with stories seen as more scandalous in nature. In the late 2010s through the 2020s, true crime stories became more prevalent, with programs being centered solely around them. Newsmagazine programs usually air during the late-afternoon or fringe time hour.

Note - all programs listed air in syndication

==== Current ====
Traditional

- The Good Side
- Inside Edition
- InvestigateTV+

Celebrity news/tabloid

- Entertainment Tonight
- Extra
- TMZ

True crime

- Crime Exposé with Nancy O'Dell
- iCrime with Elizabeth Vargas

Sports

- Front Office Sports Tonight
- In Depth with Graham Bensinger
- SportsWrap with Jason Page

=== Sunday morning news programs ===
On Sundays, most networks devote at least part of their Sunday morning schedule to news and political discussion programming. These programs review news events that occurred in the previous week and cover events expected to make national headlines in the coming week.

==== Current ====
Network

- Face the Nation (CBS)
- Fox News Sunday (Fox)
- The Hill (CW and Nexstar statons)
- Meet the Press (NBC)
- This Week (ABC)

=== Talk shows ===
In their early years NBC and ABC added daytime talk shows to their lineups. In the 1960s daytime soap operas became more prevalent on the networks, with talk shows moving to (and thriving in) syndication during the 1970s and 1980s. Since the 1990s, both NBC and ABC have added talk shows to their network lineups, while CBS had a single talk show - The Talk - from 2010 to 2024. Talk shows typically last one hour, and are more often than not hosted by already known celebrities and can take various forms - from a traditional single host, to a duo (usually a man and woman), to multiple hosts in a panel format. Talk shows deal with a variety of topics, like educational/self-help subjects, celebrity interviews, comedic monologues, stage performances, and tabloid/conflict oriented programs. Talk shows usually air in the morning and afternoon hours.

A form of locally-produced daytime talk show is aired by some television stations, which usually focus primarily on lifestyle topics and other soft features. However, their main purpose is to serve as a vehicle for advertorial segments paid for by advertisers, such as local businesses.

==== Current ====
Network

- The 3rd (NBC)
- Today with Jenna & Sheinelle (NBC)
- The View (ABC)

Syndicated

- The Drew Barrymore Show
- The Jason Show
- The Jennifer Hudson Show
- Live with Kelly and Mark
- The Tamron Hall Show
- TMZ Live

=== Off-network syndicated programming ===
Syndication is the practice of selling rights to the presentation of television programs, especially to more than one customer such as a television station, a cable channel, or a programming service such as a national broadcasting system. The syndication of television programs is a fundamental financial component of television industries. Long a crucial factor in the economics of the U.S. industry, syndication is now a worldwide activity involving the sales of programming produced in many countries. While most of the series currently in syndication are either still in production or have only recently ended their runs, the most popular series can command syndication runs lasting decades beyond the end of their production. Off-network syndicated programming mostly airs reruns of cancelled prime time network shows and normally occupies the mid/late morning and late-afternoon time slots.

Networks have also been known to rerun scripted programming in daytime, though much less so with the proliferation of syndication, cable television and satellite television in the 1980s and 1990s. The last time a network is known to have done this is when CBS aired reruns of Designing Women from 1991-1992. However, it wasn't until 14 years later in 2006 When Daytime WB aired reruns of Reba along with previous shows such as ER since 2009 no major TV networks has aired any reruns on the daytime slot.

Note that the series listed below are not necessarily restricted to daytime and can air in any open time slot.

==== Current off-network series in syndication ====
Broadcast

Weekdays

- 48 Hours
- America's Funniest Home Videos
- The Big Bang Theory
- Bob Hearts Abishola
- Chicago Fire
- Chicago P.D.
- The Conners
- Dateline
- FBI: Most Wanted
- Friends
- The Goldbergs
- Last Man Standing
- Modern Family
- The Neighborhood
- Police 24/7
- Seinfeld
- The Simpsons
- Two and a Half Men
- Young Sheldon

Weekends

- Blue Bloods
- The Equalizer
- 9-1-1
- The Rookie
- S.W.A.T.

Cable

Weekdays

- Below Deck
- Court Cam
- Forensic Files
- Live PD
- Pawn Stars
- Storm of Suspicion
- World's Funniest Weather

Weekends

- Deadline to Disaster
- Deep Water Salvage
- Fast: Home Rescue
- SOS: How to Survive
- Weather Gone Viral
- Weird Earth

Canadian

Weekdays

- Just For Laughs Gags
- The Liquidator

Weekends

- Heartland
- Murdoch Mysteries

=== Children's programs ===
Long before Nickelodeon and other youth-oriented cable channels launched, children's programs were also part of network and syndicated television's daytime programming lineup. These programs specialized in entertainment and education for preschool and children of elementary school age and mostly occupied morning time slots as well as after-school hours (4:00p.m. – 6:00p.m. ET). Captain Kangaroo, which aired on CBS from 1955 to 1984, was one of television's longest-running and most popular program of the genre; while Romper Room was a staple in syndication. PBS also aired various children's programs; among its most popular being Sesame Street, The Electric Company, and Mister Rogers' Neighborhood. Local stations also occasionally aired classic cartoons along with classic reruns of The Mickey Mouse Club and Our Gang comedy shorts (billed as "The Little Rascals"); as well as youth-oriented sitcoms such as Happy Days, What's Happening!!, and Saved By The Bell.

From the 1970s through the 1990s, ABC and CBS aired weekly specials for teenagers and pre-adolescents: ABC Afterschool Special and CBS Schoolbreak Special, which aired once a week during after-school hours in the academic school year, pre-empting their affiliate stations' regularly scheduled programming on that day. Some stories in these specials were light in nature, while other stories focused on more serious teen issues; such as teen pregnancy, drug/alcohol abuse, runaways, bullying, and family issues.

== Daytime programming breakdown ==
See also Dayparting

The following table shows the general breakdown of the American daytime television schedule; although it may vary depending on time zone, region, networks and local stations.

Time Range (ET)	Time Slot	Types of daytime programming normally aired
6:00–9:00 a.m.	Early morning	Local and network morning news programs, children's programs
9:00–11:00 a.m.	Mid-morning	Game shows, talk shows, court shows, newsmagazines, syndicated programming, children's programs
11:00 a.m.-noon	Late-morning	Local and Network news, game shows, talk shows, court shows, newsmagazines, syndicated programming, children’s programs
noon-2:00 p.m.	Early afternoon	Local and Network news, soap operas
2:00– 4:00 p.m.	Mid-afternoon	Soap operas, talk shows, court shows
4:00– 6:00 p.m.	Late-afternoon	Local news (especially in the 5:00 hour), game shows, talk shows, court shows, newsmagazines, syndicated programming, children's programs
6:00–7:00 p.m.	Early evening	Local and network news (primarily on major-network stations), syndicated programs (especially on mid-major-network and independent stations)
7:00–8:00 p.m.	Fringe time	Local or network news (on selected stations in the Eastern and Pacific Time Zones), game shows, newsmagazines, off-network sitcoms

== See also ==
- List of US daytime soap opera ratings
- Dayparting
- Prime-time television
- Graveyard slot
- Fringe time
