= Protection Court =

American reality court show (2019–2020)

- Genre: Nontraditional reality court show
- Starring: Carroll Kelly (judge); Ceneca Valdez (bailiff)
- Narrated by: Dean Shull
- Country of origin: United States
- Original language: English
- No. of seasons: 1
- No. of episodes: 110

Production
- Executive producers: Scott Sternberg; Hank Cohan; Phil Belmonte
- Producers: Javier Romero; Mayra Rocha
- Editors: Jay Bowman; Kevin Connolly; Richard Hyatt; Joel Ray
- Running time: 19 minutes
- Production companies: Scott Sternberg Productions; Trifecta Entertainment & Media

Original release
- Network: Syndicated
- Release: September 16, 2019 – March 18, 2020

Protection Court is an American nontraditional reality court show and series starring Judge Carroll Kelly and produced by Trifecta Entertainment & Media with Scott Sternberg Productions.

== Synopsis ==
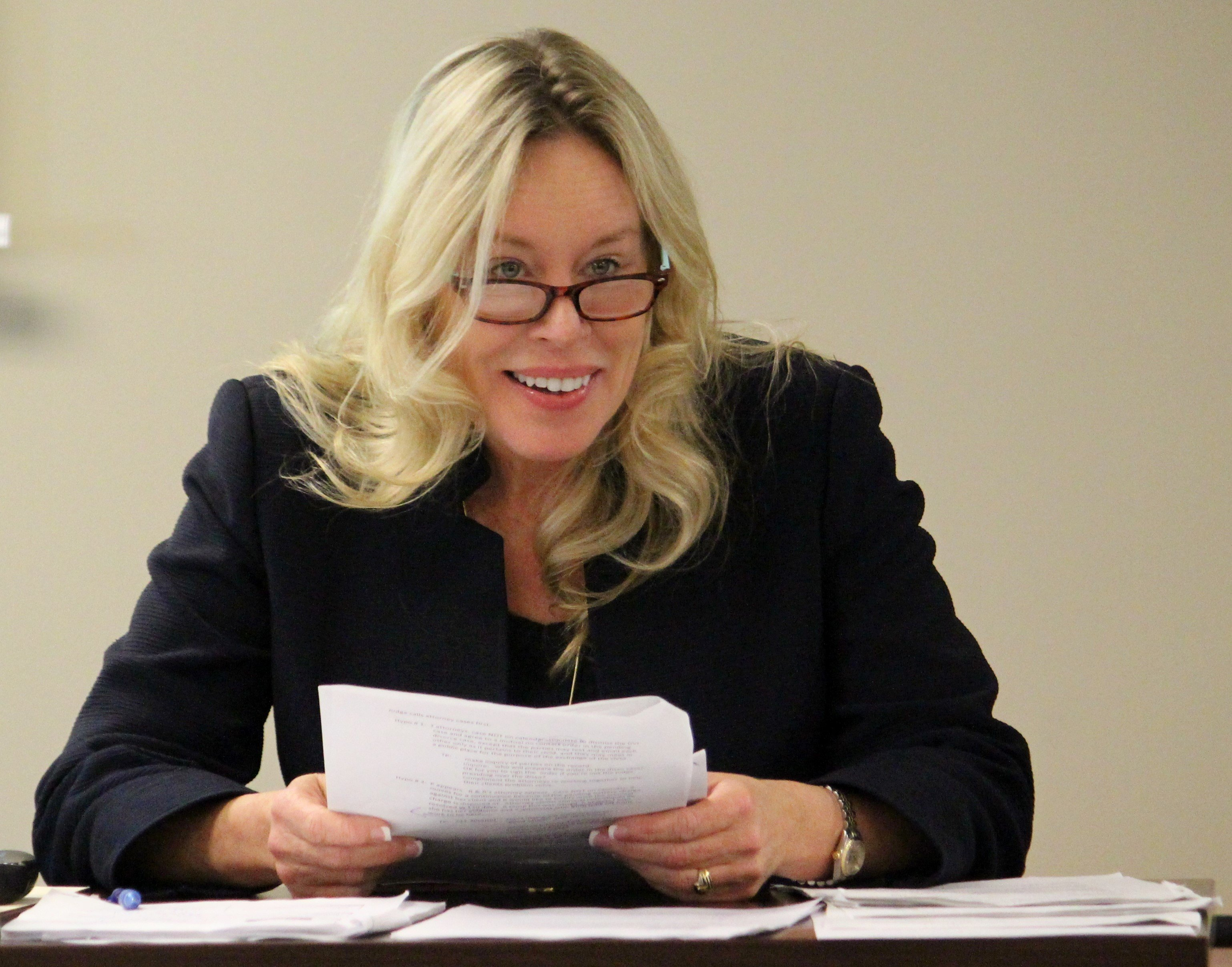
Judge Carroll J. Kelly in 2017

The show features real cases of people seeking restraining orders at the Lawson E. Thomas Courthouse in Miami, presided over by Judge Carroll Kelly, who has served as administrative judge for the domestic violence division of Dade County, FL for 22 years. Both the producer Scott Sternberg, and Judge Kelly made statements prior to the original release of the show describing their thoughts on what the show was about. They said that real people from the public would be entering into a real courtroom situation, and that the show would not only benefit its participants, but would also serve as an educational and informational tool for viewers who might be in similar situations.

== Production ==
In 2018, prior to the filming of Protection Court, the Florida Judicial Ethics Advisory Committee released an opinion that the decision as to 'Whether a judge may permit court cases to be filmed and televised' should be made by court administration, since it was not an ethical issue. Subsequently, the filming of Protection Court was approved of by the court administration.

Trifecta Entertainment stated that a motivating factor behind the production of the show was the prevalence of intimate partner and domestic violence in the United States, affecting 1 in 4 women, 1 in 10 men, and 1 in 15 children. The show originally aired from 2019 to 2020 in broadcast syndication. It went out of production due to issues related to the Coronavirus pandemic, but was later licensed for broadcast by Law&Crime on March 21, 2022.

== Controversy ==
In 2020, Protection Court drew controversial media attention when the Florida Judicial Qualifications Commission filed a complaint against Kelly related to the show, due to allegations of litigants being filmed without their consent, and allegations that Kelly "made misleading statements" to the court administration when seeking approval to film the show. The show continued to air during the investigation. Some of the arguments made by Kelly include the facts that footage of litigants who did not give consent was not used in the show, and that the JQC was in violation of a settlement agreement where Kelly agreed to stop participating in the show. Kelly had stopped participating, but episodes continued to air using previous footage. The case against her was dropped.

== See also ==
- Court show
- List of court shows
