= List of On Patrol: Live and On Patrol: First Shift episodes =

On Patrol: Live is an American reality television and docuseries that premiered on Reelz on July 22, 2022. It is hosted by Dan Abrams, former Tulsa Police Department Sergeant Sean "Sticks" Larkin, and Curtis Wilson, a deputy with the Richland County Sheriff's Department. The series is considered a revival of Live PD which aired on A&E from 2016 to 2020, and was also hosted by Abrams and Larkin. An additional set of 90 episodes was ordered on January 12, 2024, which will comprise the series third season and run through January 2025. A companion series, titled On Patrol: First Shift premiered in August 2022 and serves as a lead-in to new episodes of On Patrol: Live.

== On Patrol: Live ==
=== Series overview ===
Season	Episodes	Originally released	
Season	Episodes	First released	Last released
1	96	July 22, 2022	July 15, 2023
2	88	July 21, 2023	June 30, 2024
3	92	July 12, 2024	June 28, 2025
4	90	July 11, 2025	June 27, 2026
5	TBA	July 10, 2026	TBA

=== Episodes ===
==== Season 1 (2022–23) ====
No. overall	No. in season	Title	Original release date	U.S. viewers (millions)	Rating (18–49)
1	1	"072222"	July 22, 2022	0.865	0.20
2	2	"072322"	July 23, 2022	0.983	0.20
3	3	"072922"	July 29, 2022	1.049	0.23
4	4	"073022"	July 30, 2022	0.943	0.19
5	5	"080522"	August 5, 2022	0.979	0.19
6	6	"080622"	August 6, 2022	0.968	0.24
7	7	"081222"	August 12, 2022	0.783	0.18
8	8	"081322"	August 13, 2022	0.899	0.23
9	9	"081922"	August 19, 2022	0.812	0.17
10	10	"082022"	August 20, 2022	0.853	0.20
11	11	"082622"	August 26, 2022	0.795	0.14
12	12	"082722"	August 27, 2022	0.820	0.18
13	13	"090222"	September 2, 2022	0.858	0.17
14	14	"090322"	September 3, 2022	0.874	0.17
15	15	"090922"	September 9, 2022	0.833	0.18
16	16	"091022"	September 10, 2022	0.863	0.19
17	17	"091622"	September 16, 2022	0.821	0.16
18	18	"091722"	September 17, 2022	0.664	0.15
19	19	"092322"	September 23, 2022	0.798	0.18
20	20	"092422"	September 24, 2022	0.852	0.18
21	21	"093022"	September 30, 2022	0.808	0.17
22	22	"100122"	October 1, 2022	0.756	0.14
23	23	"100722"	October 7, 2022	0.810	0.17
24	24	"100822"	October 8, 2022	0.735	0.15
25	25	"101422"	October 14, 2022	0.740	0.13
26	26	"101522"	October 15, 2022	0.746	0.17
27	27	"102122"	October 21, 2022	0.819	0.16
28	28	"102222"	October 22, 2022	0.764	0.14
29	29	"102822"	October 28, 2022	0.714	0.12
30	30	"102922"	October 29, 2022	0.762	0.14
31	31	"110422"	November 4, 2022	0.707	0.15
32	32	"110522"	November 5, 2022	0.659	0.14
33	33	"111122"	November 11, 2022	0.775	0.15
34	34	"111222"	November 12, 2022	0.757	0.15
35	35	"111822"	November 18, 2022	0.826	0.16
36	36	"111922"	November 19, 2022	0.834	0.16
37	37	"112522"	November 25, 2022	0.886	0.19
38	38	"112622"	November 26, 2022	0.839	0.18
39	39	"120222"	December 2, 2022	0.783	0.15
40	40	"120322"	December 3, 2022	0.745	0.15
41	41	"120922"	December 9, 2022	0.793	0.14
42	42	"121022"	December 10, 2022	0.846	0.17
43	43	"121622"	December 16, 2022	0.890	0.16
44	44	"121722"	December 17, 2022	0.815	0.16
45	45	"010623"	January 6, 2023	0.846	0.16
46	46	"010723"	January 7, 2023	0.843	0.14
47	47	"011323"	January 13, 2023	0.824	0.16
48	48	"011423"	January 14, 2023	0.804	0.17
49	49	"012023"	January 20, 2023	0.801	0.16
50	50	"012123"	January 21, 2023	0.838	0.16
51	51	"012723"	January 27, 2023	0.920	0.19
52	52	"012823"	January 28, 2023	0.918	0.15
53	53	"020323"	February 3, 2023	0.756	0.17
54	54	"020423"	February 4, 2023	0.856	0.17
55	55	"021023"	February 10, 2023	0.762	0.14
56	56	"021123"	February 11, 2023	0.833	0.17
57	57	"021723"	February 17, 2023	0.710	0.14
58	58	"021823"	February 18, 2023	0.851	0.16
59	59	"022423"	February 24, 2023	0.739	0.14
60	60	"022523"	February 25, 2023	0.830	0.14
61	61	"030323"	March 3, 2023	0.840	0.16
62	62	"030423"	March 4, 2023	0.959	0.16
63	63	"031023"	March 10, 2023	0.890	0.15
64	64	"031123"	March 11, 2023	0.889	0.18
65	65	"031723"	March 17, 2023	0.997	0.20
66	66	"031823"	March 18, 2023	0.887	0.15
67	67	"032423"	March 24, 2023	0.665	0.15
68	68	"032523"	March 25, 2023	0.827	0.18
69	69	"033123"	March 31, 2023	0.776	0.18
70	70	"040123"	April 1, 2023	0.844	0.14
71	71	"040723"	April 7, 2023	0.809	0.17
72	72	"040823"	April 8, 2023	0.815	0.16
73	73	"041423"	April 14, 2023	0.730	0.15
74	74	"041523"	April 15, 2023	0.873	0.18
75	75	"042123"	April 21, 2023	0.430	0.07
76	76	"042223"	April 22, 2023	0.886	0.19
77	77	"042823"	April 28, 2023	0.794	0.15
78	78	"042923"	April 29, 2023	0.834	0.16
79	79	"050523"	May 5, 2023	0.756	0.14
80	80	"050623"	May 6, 2023	0.747	0.15
81	81	"051223"	May 12, 2023	0.725	0.14
82	82	"051323"	May 13, 2023	0.897	0.18
83	83	"051923"	May 19, 2023	0.810	0.13
84	84	"052023"	May 20, 2023	0.810	0.17
85	85	"060223"	June 2, 2023	0.791	0.15
86	86	"060323"	June 3, 2023	0.909	0.15
87	87	"060923"	June 9, 2023	0.887	0.15
88	88	"061023"	June 10, 2023	0.898	0.18
89	89	"061623"	June 16, 2023	0.794	0.15
90	90	"061723"	June 17, 2023	0.797	0.14
91	91	"062323"	June 23, 2023	0.735	0.13
92	92	"062423"	June 24, 2023	0.785	0.11
93	93	"070723"	July 7, 2023	0.751	0.11
94	94	"070823"	July 8, 2023	0.711	0.11
95	95	"071423"	July 14, 2023	0.884	0.14
96	96	"071523"	July 15, 2023	0.793	0.11

==== Season 2 (2023-24) ====
No. overall	No. in season	Title	Original release date	U.S. viewers (millions)	Rating (18–49)
97	1	"072123"	July 21, 2023	N/A	TBA
98	2	"072223"	July 22, 2023	N/A	TBA
99	3	"072823"	July 28, 2023	0.907	0.16
100	4	"072923"	July 29, 2023	0.803	0.14
101	5	"080423"	August 4, 2023	0.856	0.15
102	6	"080523"	August 5, 2023	0.925	0.15
103	7	"081123"	August 11, 2023	0.808	0.17
104	8	"081223"	August 12, 2023	0.956	0.15
105	9	"081823"	August 18, 2023	0.993	0.19
106	10	"081923"	August 19, 2023	0.872	0.19
107	11	"090823"	September 8, 2023	0.823	0.13
108	12	"090923"	September 9, 2023	0.771	0.12
109	13	"091523"	September 15, 2023	0.751	0.13
110	14	"091623"	September 16, 2023	0.675	0.11
111	15	"092223"	September 22, 2023	0.743	0.11
112	16	"092323"	September 23, 2023	0.740	0.13
113	17	"092923"	September 29, 2023	0.690	0.12
114	18	"093023"	September 30, 2023	0.635	0.09
115	19	"100623"	October 6, 2023	0.769	0.12
116	20	"100723"	October 7, 2023	0.708	0.12
117	21	"101323"	October 13, 2023	0.772	0.12
118	22	"101423"	October 14, 2023	0.659	0.09
119	23	"102023"	October 20, 2023	0.627	0.08
120	24	"102123"	October 21, 2023	0.672	0.08
121	25	"102723"	October 27, 2023	0.606	0.09
122	26	"102823"	October 28, 2023	0.639	0.08
123	27	"110323"	November 3, 2023	0.592	0.07
124	28	"110423"	November 4, 2023	0.656	0.09
125	29	"111023"	November 10, 2023	0.762	0.13
126	30	"111123"	November 11, 2023	0.843	0.14
127	31	"111723"	November 17, 2023	0.709	0.11
128	32	"111823"	November 18, 2023	0.680	0.10
129	33	"112423"	November 24, 2023	0.790	0.11
130	34	"112523"	November 25, 2023	0.743	0.10
131	35	"120123"	December 1, 2023	0.701	0.10
132	36	"120223"	December 2, 2023	0.691	0.09
133	37	"120823"	December 8, 2023	0.737	0.10
134	38	"120923"	December 9, 2023	0.781	0.10
135	39	"121523"	December 15, 2023	0.720	0.11
136	40	"121623"	December 16, 2023	0.659	0.08
137	41	"010524"	January 5, 2024	0.880	0.16
138	42	"010624"	January 6, 2024	0.776	0.10
139	43	"011224"	January 12, 2024	0.855	0.15
140	44	"011324"	January 13, 2024	0.799	0.15
141	45	"011924"	January 19, 2024	0.943	0.16
142	46	"012024"	January 20, 2024	0.709	0.10
143	47	"012624"	January 26, 2024	0.983	0.18
144	48	"012724"	January 27, 2024	0.910	0.15
145	49	"020224"	February 2, 2024	0.891	0.12
146	50	"020324"	February 3, 2024	0.896	0.15
147	51	"020924"	February 9, 2024	0.952	0.16
148	52	"021024"	February 10, 2024	0.932	0.13
149	53	"022324"	February 23, 2024	0.894	0.18
150	54	"022424"	February 24, 2024	0.889	0.14
151	55	"030124"	March 1, 2024	0.762	0.12
152	56	"030224"	March 2, 2024	0.840	0.10
153	57	"030824"	March 8, 2024	0.830	0.15
154	58	"030924"	March 9, 2024	0.783	0.12
155	59	"031524"	March 15, 2024	0.768	0.11
156	60	"031624"	March 16, 2024	0.934	0.15
157	61	"032224"	March 22, 2024	0.746	0.11
158	62	"032324"	March 23, 2024	0.860	0.14
159	63	"040524"	April 5, 2024	0.752	0.12
160	64	"040624"	April 6, 2024	0.692	0.09
161	65	"041224"	April 12, 2024	0.813	0.11
162	66	"041324"	April 13, 2024	0.889	0.14
163	67	"041924"	April 19, 2024	0.768	0.11
164	68	"042024"	April 20, 2024	0.790	0.12
165	69	"042624"	April 26, 2024	0.702	0.13
166	70	"042724"	April 27, 2024	0.861	0.14
167	71	"050324"	May 3, 2024	0.720	0.12
168	72	"050424"	May 4, 2024	0.822	0.11
169	73	"051024"	May 10, 2024	0.643	0.12
170	74	"051124"	May 11, 2024	0.734	0.11
171	75	"051724"	May 17, 2024	0.737	0.10
172	76	"051824"	May 18, 2024	0.780	0.14
173	77	"052424"	May 24, 2024	0.633	0.07
174	78	"052524"	May 25, 2024	0.638	0.09
175	79	"053124"	May 31, 2024	0.719	0.09
176	80	"060124"	June 1, 2024	0.797	0.10
177	81	"060724"	June 7, 2024	0.846	0.14
178	82	"060824"	June 8, 2024	0.763	0.09
179	83	"061424"	June 14, 2024	0.756	0.12
180	84	"061524"	June 15, 2024	0.846	0.13
181	85	"062124"	June 21, 2024	0.710	0.10
182	86	"062224"	June 22, 2024	0.646	0.08
183	87	"062824"	June 28, 2024	0.669	0.10
184	88	"062924"	June 29, 2024	0.741	0.10
184	88	"062924"	June 30, 2024 (Note: This episode included an additional fourth hour of programming that did not conclude until June 30, 2024.)	0.741	0.10

==== Season 3 (2024-25) ====
No. overall	No. in season	Title	Original release date	U.S. viewers (millions)	Rating (18–49)
185	1	"071224"	July 12, 2024	0.803	0.15
186	2	"071324"	July 13, 2024	0.691	0.16
187	3	"071924"	July 19, 2024	0.864	0.15
188	4	"072024"	July 20, 2024	0.836	0.12
189	5	"072624"	July 26, 2024	0.718	0.13
190	6	"072724"	July 27, 2024	0.756	0.10
191	7	"080224"	August 2, 2024	0.715	0.09
192	8	"080324"	August 3, 2024	0.773	0.11
193	9	"080924"	August 9, 2024	0.686	0.10
194	10	"081024"	August 10, 2024	0.779	0.11
195	11	"081624"	August 16, 2024	0.739	0.11
196	12	"081724"	August 17, 2024	0.737	0.12
197	13	"082324"	August 23, 2024	0.778	0.12
198	14	"082424"	August 24, 2024	0.737	0.10
199	15	"091324"	September 13, 2024	0.695	0.11
200	16	"091424"	September 14, 2024	0.706	0.10
201	17	"092024"	September 20, 2024	0.609	0.11
202	18	"092124"	September 21, 2024	0.593	0.07
203	19	"092724"	September 27, 2024	0.589	0.11
204	20	"092824"	September 28, 2024	0.547	0.08
205	21	"100424"	October 4, 2024	0.604	0.12
206	22	"100524"	October 5, 2024	0.650	0.13
207	23	"101124"	October 11, 2024	0.686	0.12
208	24	"101224"	October 12, 2024	0.624	0.10
209	25	"101824"	October 18, 2024	0.533	0.09
210	26	"101924"	October 19, 2024	0.541	0.09
211	27	"102524"	October 25, 2024	0.501	0.09
212	28	"102624"	October 26, 2024	0.450	0.07
213	29	"110124"	November 1, 2024	0.595	0.12
214	30	"110224"	November 2, 2024	0.537	0.10
215	31	"110824"	November 8, 2024	0.685	0.15
216	32	"110924"	November 9, 2024	0.548	0.09
217	33	"111524"	November 15, 2024	0.496	0.08
218	34	"111624"	November 16, 2024	0.539	0.07
219	35	"112224"	November 22, 2024	0.570	0.08
220	36	"112324"	November 23, 2024	0.639	0.12
221	37	"112924"	November 29, 2024	0.533	0.09
222	38	"113024"	November 30, 2024	0.564	0.07
223	39	"120624"	December 6, 2024	0.540	0.10
224	40	"120724"	December 7, 2024	0.480	0.07
225	41	"121324"	December 13, 2024	0.585	0.11
226	42	"121424"	December 14, 2024	0.591	0.09
227	43	"122024"	December 20, 2024	0.556	0.07
228	44	"122124"	December 21, 2024	0.538	0.09
229	45	"011025"	January 10, 2025	0.524	0.07
230	46	"011125"	January 11, 2025	0.607	0.12
231	47	"011725"	January 17, 2025	0.542	0.09
232	48	"011825"	January 18, 2025	0.464	0.07
233	49	"012425"	January 24, 2025	0.547	0.09
234	50	"012525"	January 25, 2025	0.675	0.12
235	51	"013125"	January 31, 2025	0.576	0.11
236	52	"020125"	February 1, 2025	0.598	0.09
237	53	"020725"	February 7, 2025	0.545	0.08
238	54	"020825"	February 8, 2025	0.586	0.08
239	55	"021425"	February 14, 2025	0.538	0.07
240	56	"021525"	February 15, 2025	0.585	0.10
241	57	"022125"	February 21, 2025	0.513	0.08
242	58	"022225"	February 22, 2025	0.581	0.08
243	59	"022825"	February 28, 2025	0.507	0.08
244	60	"030125"	March 1, 2025	0.546	0.09
245	61	"030725"	March 7, 2025	0.520	0.09
246	62	"030825"	March 8, 2025	0.596	0.12
247	63	"031425"	March 14, 2025	0.565	0.11
248	64	"031525"	March 15, 2025	0.579	0.09
249	65	"032125"	March 21, 2025	0.522	0.09
250	66	"032225"	March 22, 2025	0.535	0.08
251	67	"032825"	March 28, 2025	0.529	0.11
252	68	"032925"	March 29, 2025	0.554	0.10
253	69	"041125"	April 11, 2025	0.534	0.09
254	70	"041225"	April 12, 2025	0.554	0.09
255	71	"041825"	April 18, 2025	0.548	0.10
256	72	"041925"	April 19, 2025	0.647	0.11
257	73	"042525"	April 25, 2025	0.502	0.07
258	74	"042625"	April 26, 2025	0.508	0.09
Departments This Episode: Fontana Police Dept, CA - Indian River County Sheriff’s Office, FL - Richland County Sheriff’s Dept, SC - Toledo Police Department, OH - Hazen Police Dept, AR - Coweta County Sheriff's Office, GA - Daytona Beach Police Dept., FL - Berkeley County Sheriff's Office, SC - Lee County Sheriff's Office, FL
259	75	"050225"	May 2, 2025	0.456	0.06
260	76	"050325"	May 3, 2025	0.456	0.07
261	77	"050925"	May 9, 2025	0.539	0.09
262	78	"051025"	May 10, 2025	0.627	0.11
263	79	"051625"	May 16, 2025	0.495	0.09
264	80	"051725"	May 17, 2025	0.561	0.07
265	81	"052325"	May 23, 2025	0.492	0.07
266	82	"052425"	May 24, 2025	0.544	0.08
267	83	"053025"	May 30, 2025	0.552	0.09
268	84	"053125"	May 31, 2025	0.486	0.08
269	85	"060625"	June 6, 2025	0.485	0.10
270	86	"060725"	June 7, 2025	0.625	0.07
271	87	"061325"	June 13, 2025	0.473	0.06
272	88	"061425"	June 14, 2025	0.526	0.07
273	89	"062025"	June 20, 2025	0.511	0.07
274	90	"062125"	June 21, 2025	0.510	0.06
275	91	"062725"	June 27, 2025	0.511	0.07
276	92	"062825"	June 28, 2025	0.503	0.08

==== Season 4 (2025-26) ====
No. overall	No. in season	Title	Original release date	U.S. viewers (millions)	Rating (18–49)
277	1	"071125"	July 11, 2025	0.486	0.08
278	2	"071225"	July 12, 2025	0.543	0.07
279	3	"071825"	July 18, 2025	0.511	0.09
280	4	"071925"	July 19, 2025	0.492	0.08
281	5	"072525"	July 25, 2025	0.493	0.07
282	6	"072625"	July 26, 2025	0.543	0.08
283	7	"080125"	August 1, 2025	0.567	0.11
284	8	"080225"	August 2, 2025	0.608	0.11
285	9	"080825"	August 8, 2025	0.444	0.08
286	10	"080925"	August 9, 2025	0.566	0.09
287	11	"081525"	August 15, 2025	0.510	0.08
288	12	"081625"	August 16, 2025	0.480	0.08
289	13	"082225"	August 22, 2025	0.503	0.09
290	14	"082325"	August 23, 2025	0.541	0.09
291	15	"091225"	September 12, 2025	0.407	0.06
292	16	"091325"	September 13, 2025	0.342	0.05
293	17	"091925"	September 19, 2025	0.456	0.09
294	18	"092025"	September 20, 2025	0.442	0.09
295	19	"092625"	September 26, 2025	N/A	TBA
296	20	"092725"	September 27, 2025	N/A	TBA
297	21	"100325"	October 3, 2025	N/A	TBA
298	22	"100425"	October 4, 2025	N/A	TBA
299	23	"101025"	October 10, 2025	N/A	TBA
300	24	"101125"	October 11, 2025	N/A	TBA
301	25	"101725"	October 17, 2025	N/A	TBA
302	26	"101825"	October 18, 2025	N/A	TBA
303	27	"103125"	October 31, 2025	N/A	TBA
304	28	"110125"	November 1, 2025	N/A	TBA
305	29	"110725"	November 7, 2025	N/A	TBA
306	30	"110825"	November 8, 2025	N/A	TBA
307	31	"111425"	November 14, 2025	N/A	TBA
308	32	"111525"	November 15, 2025	N/A	TBA
309	33	"112125"	November 21, 2025	N/A	TBA
310	34	"112225"	November 22, 2025	N/A	TBA
311	35	"112825"	November 28, 2025	N/A	TBA
312	36	"112925"	November 29, 2025	N/A	TBA
313	37	"120525"	December 5, 2025	N/A	TBA
314	38	"120625"	December 6, 2025	N/A	TBA
315	39	"121225"	December 12, 2025	N/A	TBA
316	40	"121325"	December 13, 2025	N/A	TBA
317	41	"121925"	December 19, 2025	N/A	TBA
318	42	"122025"	December 20, 2025	N/A	TBA
319	43	"010926"	January 9, 2026	N/A	TBA
320	44	"011026"	January 10, 2026	N/A	TBA
321	45	"011626"	January 16, 2026	N/A	TBA
322	46	"011726"	January 17, 2026	N/A	TBA
323	47	"012326"	January 23, 2026	N/A	TBA
324	48	"012426"	January 24, 2026	N/A	TBA
325	49	"013026"	January 30, 2026	N/A	TBA
326	50	"013126"	January 31, 2026	N/A	TBA
327	51	"020626"	February 6, 2026	N/A	TBA
328	52	"020726"	February 7, 2026	N/A	TBA
329	53	"021326"	February 13, 2026	N/A	TBA
330	54	"021426"	February 14, 2026	N/A	TBA
331	55	"022026"	February 20, 2026	N/A	TBA
332	56	"022126"	February 21, 2026	N/A	TBA
333	57	"022726"	February 27, 2026	N/A	TBA
334	58	"022826"	February 28, 2026	N/A	TBA
335	59	"030626"	March 6, 2026	N/A	TBA
336	60	"030726"	March 7, 2026	N/A	TBA
337	61	"031326"	March 13, 2026	N/A	TBA
338	62	"031426"	March 14, 2026	N/A	TBA
339	63	"032026"	March 20, 2026	N/A	TBA
340	64	"032126"	March 21, 2026	N/A	TBA
341	65	"032726"	March 27, 2026	N/A	TBA
342	66	"032826"	March 28, 2026	N/A	TBA
343	67	"041026"	April 10, 2026	N/A	TBA
344	68	"041126"	April 11, 2026	N/A	TBA
345	69	"041726"	April 17, 2026	N/A	TBA
346	70	"041826"	April 18, 2026	N/A	TBA
347	71	"042426"	April 24, 2026	N/A	TBA
348	72	"042526"	April 25, 2026	N/A	TBA
349	73	"050126"	May 1, 2026	N/A	TBA
350	74	"050226"	May 2, 2026	N/A	TBA
351	75	"050826"	May 8, 2026	N/A	TBA
352	76	"050926"	May 9, 2026	N/A	TBA
353	77	"051526"	May 15, 2026	N/A	TBA
354	78	"051626"	May 16, 2026	N/A	TBA
355	79	"052226"	May 22, 2026	N/A	TBA
356	80	"052326"	May 23, 2026	N/A	TBA
357	81	"052926"	May 29, 2026	N/A	TBA
358	82	"053026"	May 30, 2026	N/A	TBA
359	83	"060526"	June 5, 2026	N/A	TBA
360	84	"060626"	June 6, 2026	N/A	TBA
361	85	"061226"	June 12, 2026	N/A	TBA
362	86	"061326"	June 13, 2026	N/A	TBA
363	87	"061926"	June 19, 2026	N/A	TBA
364	88	"062026"	June 20, 2026	N/A	TBA
365	89	"062626"	June 26, 2026	N/A	TBA
366	90	"062726"	June 27, 2026	N/A	TBA

==== Season 5 (2026) ====
No. overall	No. in season	Title	Original release date	U.S. viewers (millions)	Rating (18–49)
367	1	"071026"	July 10, 2026	N/A	TBA
368	2	"071126"	July 11, 2026	N/A	TBA
369	3	"071726"	July 17, 2026	N/A	TBA
370	4	"071826"	July 18, 2026	N/A	TBA
371	5	"072426"	July 24, 2026	N/A	TBA
372	6	"072526"	July 25, 2026	N/A	TBA
373	7	"073126"	July 31, 2026	N/A	TBA
374	8	"080126"	August 1, 2026	N/A	TBA
375	9	"080726"	August 7, 2026	N/A	TBA
376	10	"080826"	August 8, 2026	N/A	TBA
377	11	"081426"	August 14, 2026	N/A	TBA
378	12	"081526"	August 15, 2026	N/A	TBA
379	13	"082126"	August 21, 2026	N/A	TBA
380	14	"082226"	August 22, 2026	N/A	TBA
381	15	"082826"	August 28, 2026	N/A	TBA
382	16	"082926"	August 29, 2026	N/A	TBA
383	17	"091826"	September 18, 2026	N/A	TBA
384	18	"091926"	September 19, 2026	N/A	TBA
385	19	"092526"	September 25, 2026	N/A	TBA
386	20	"092626"	September 26, 2026	N/A	TBA
387	21	"100226"	October 2, 2026	N/A	TBA
388	22	"100326"	October 3, 2026	N/A	TBA
389	23	"100926"	October 9, 2026	N/A	TBA
390	24	"101026"	October 10, 2026	N/A	TBA
391	25	"101626"	October 16, 2026	N/A	TBA
392	26	"101726"	October 17, 2026	N/A	TBA
393	27	"103026"	October 30, 2026	TBD	TBA
394	28	"103126"	October 31, 2026	TBD	TBA
395	29	"110626"	November 6, 2026	TBD	TBA
396	30	"110726"	November 7, 2026	TBD	TBA
397	31	"111326"	November 13, 2026	TBD	TBA
398	32	"111426"	November 14, 2026	TBD	TBA
399	33	"112026"	November 20, 2026	TBD	TBA
400	34	"112126"	November 21, 2026	TBD	TBA
401	35	"112726"	November 27, 2026	TBD	TBA
402	36	"112826"	November 28, 2026	TBD	TBA

== On Patrol: First Shift ==
=== First Shift series overview ===
Season	Episodes	Originally released	
Season	Episodes	First released	Last released
1	90	August 12, 2022	July 15, 2023
2	88	July 21, 2023	June 29, 2024
3	92	July 12, 2024	June 28, 2025
4	90	July 11, 2025	June 27, 2026
5	TBA	July 10, 2026	TBA

=== Episodes ===
==== Season 1 (2022–23) ====
No. overall	No. in season	Title	Original release date	U.S. viewers (millions)	Rating (18–49)
1	1	"081222"	August 12, 2022	0.343	0.06
2	2	"081322"	August 13, 2022	0.462	0.12
3	3	"081922"	August 19, 2022	0.456	0.09
4	4	"082022"	August 20, 2022	0.465	0.09
5	5	"082622"	August 26, 2022	0.445	0.07
6	6	"082722"	August 27, 2022	0.437	0.07
7	7	"090222"	September 2, 2022	0.457	0.08
8	8	"090322"	September 3, 2022	0.395	0.05
9	9	"090922"	September 9, 2022	0.442	0.09
10	10	"091022"	September 10, 2022	0.450	0.09
11	11	"091622"	September 16, 2022	0.402	0.06
12	12	"091722"	September 17, 2022	0.425	0.06
13	13	"092322"	September 23, 2022	0.402	0.08
14	14	"092422"	September 24, 2022	0.449	0.06
15	15	"093022"	September 30, 2022	0.375	0.07
16	16	"100122"	October 1, 2022	0.453	0.05
17	17	"100722"	October 7, 2022	0.461	0.07
18	18	"100822"	October 8, 2022	0.437	0.08
19	19	"101422"	October 14, 2022	0.402	0.05
20	20	"101522"	October 15, 2022	0.455	0.10
21	21	"102122"	October 21, 2022	0.427	0.07
22	22	"102222"	October 22, 2022	0.401	0.07
23	23	"102822"	October 28, 2022	0.313	0.04
24	24	"102922"	October 29, 2022	0.444	0.08
25	25	"110422"	November 4, 2022	0.359	0.06
26	26	"110522"	November 5, 2022	0.318	0.04
27	27	"111122"	November 11, 2022	0.417	0.08
28	28	"111222"	November 12, 2022	0.467	0.06
29	29	"111822"	November 18, 2022	0.517	0.08
30	30	"111922"	November 19, 2022	0.517	0.08
31	31	"112522"	November 25, 2022	0.470	0.07
32	32	"112622"	November 26, 2022	0.455	0.10
33	33	"120222"	December 2, 2022	0.492	0.07
34	34	"120322"	December 3, 2022	0.444	0.07
35	35	"120922"	December 9, 2022	0.482	0.07
36	36	"121022"	December 10, 2022	0.590	0.09
37	37	"121622"	December 16, 2022	0.475	0.08
38	38	"121722"	December 17, 2022	0.590	0.11
39	39	"010623"	January 6, 2023	0.407	0.06
40	40	"010723"	January 7, 2023	0.574	0.09
41	41	"011323"	January 13, 2023	0.572	0.10
42	42	"011423"	January 14, 2023	0.453	0.06
43	43	"012023"	January 20, 2023	0.436	0.04
44	44	"012123"	January 21, 2023	0.423	0.06
45	45	"012723"	January 27, 2023	0.389	0.04
46	46	"012823"	January 28, 2023	0.546	0.05
47	47	"020323"	February 3, 2023	0.358	0.05
48	48	"020423"	February 4, 2023	0.513	0.09
49	49	"021023"	February 10, 2023	0.389	0.06
50	50	"021123"	February 11, 2023	0.553	0.09
51	51	"021723"	February 17, 2023	0.381	0.08
52	52	"021823"	February 18, 2023	0.501	0.06
53	53	"022423"	February 24, 2023	0.396	0.08
54	54	"022523"	February 25, 2023	0.545	0.08
55	55	"030323"	March 3, 2023	0.466	0.07
56	56	"030423"	March 4, 2023	0.616	0.09
57	57	"031023"	March 10, 2023	0.491	0.06
58	58	"031123"	March 11, 2023	0.525	0.07
59	59	"031723"	March 17, 2023	0.545	0.08
60	60	"031823"	March 18, 2023	0.482	0.07
61	61	"032423"	March 24, 2023	0.375	0.05
62	62	"032523"	March 25, 2023	0.418	0.07
63	63	"033123"	March 31, 2023	0.379	0.07
64	64	"040123"	April 1, 2023	0.371	0.04
65	65	"040723"	April 7, 2023	0.411	0.05
66	66	"040823"	April 8, 2023	0.453	0.08
67	67	"041423"	April 14, 2023	0.340	0.05
68	68	"041523"	April 15, 2023	0.428	0.08
69	69	"042123"	April 21, 2023	0.379	0.07
70	70	"042223"	April 22, 2023	0.520	0.08
71	71	"042823"	April 28, 2023	0.350	0.05
72	72	"042923"	April 29, 2023	0.494	0.07
73	73	"050523"	May 5, 2023	0.367	0.05
74	74	"050623"	May 6, 2023	0.420	0.08
75	75	"051223"	May 12, 2023	0.381	0.05
76	76	"051323"	May 13, 2023	0.471	0.09
77	77	"051923"	May 19, 2023	0.396	0.05
78	78	"052023"	May 20, 2023	0.416	0.07
79	79	"060223"	June 2, 2023	0.401	0.05
80	80	"060323"	June 3, 2023	0.512	0.05
81	81	"060923"	June 9, 2023	0.448	0.05
82	82	"061023"	June 10, 2023	0.394	0.04
83	83	"061623"	June 16, 2023	0.442	0.06
84	84	"061723"	June 17, 2023	0.474	0.07
85	85	"062323"	June 23, 2023	0.431	0.07
86	86	"062423"	June 24, 2023	0.375	0.04
87	87	"070723"	July 7, 2023	N/A	TBA
88	88	"070823"	July 8, 2023	N/A	TBA
89	89	"071423"	July 14, 2023	N/A	TBA
90	90	"071523"	July 15, 2023	N/A	TBA

==== Season 2 (2023-24) ====
No. overall	No. in season	Title	Original release date	U.S. viewers (millions)	Rating (18–49)
91	1	"072123"	July 21, 2023	N/A	TBA
92	2	"072223"	July 22, 2023	N/A	TBA
93	3	"072823"	July 28, 2023	N/A	TBA
94	4	"072923"	July 29, 2023	N/A	TBA
95	5	"080423"	August 4, 2023	0.479	0.07
96	6	"080523"	August 5, 2023	0.620	0.09
97	7	"081123"	August 11, 2023	0.394	0.08
98	8	"081223"	August 12, 2023	0.518	0.08
99	9	"081823"	August 18, 2023	0.490	0.10
100	10	"081923"	August 19, 2023	0.462	0.09
101	11	"090823"	September 8, 2023	0.458	0.05
102	12	"090923"	September 9, 2023	0.417	0.04
103	13	"091523"	September 15, 2023	0.435	0.06
104	14	"091623"	September 16, 2023	0.441	0.06
105	15	"092223"	September 22, 2023	0.387	0.05
106	16	"092323"	September 23, 2023	0.428	0.06
107	17	"092923"	September 29, 2023	0.381	0.05
108	18	"093023"	September 30, 2023	0.403	0.05
109	19	"100623"	October 6, 2023	0.378	0.04
110	20	"100723"	October 7, 2023	0.392	0.06
111	21	"101323"	October 13, 2023	0.418	0.06
112	22	"101423"	October 14, 2023	0.375	0.04
113	23	"102023"	October 20, 2023	0.343	0.02
114	24	"102123"	October 21, 2023	0.505	0.05
115	25	"102723"	October 27, 2023	0.365	0.03
116	26	"102823"	October 28, 2023	0.412	0.03
117	27	"110323"	November 3, 2023	0.350	0.04
118	28	"110423"	November 4, 2023	0.373	0.04
119	29	"111023"	November 10, 2023	0.404	0.07
120	30	"111123"	November 11, 2023	0.545	0.10
121	31	"111723"	November 17, 2023	0.382	0.05
122	32	"111823"	November 18, 2023	0.450	0.08
123	33	"112423"	November 24, 2023	0.445	0.06
124	34	"112523"	November 25, 2023	0.443	0.04
125	35	"120123"	December 1, 2023	0.436	0.05
126	36	"120223"	December 2, 2023	0.413	0.03
127	37	"120823"	December 8, 2023	0.405	0.04
128	38	"120923"	December 9, 2023	0.400	0.02
129	39	"121523"	December 15, 2023	0.366	0.05
130	40	"121623"	December 16, 2023	0.432	0.07
131	41	"010524"	January 5, 2024	0.494	0.08
132	42	"010624"	January 6, 2024	0.459	0.03
133	43	"011224"	January 12, 2024	0.437	0.06
134	44	"011324"	January 13, 2024	0.450	0.08
135	45	"011924"	January 19, 2024	0.503	0.07
136	46	"012024"	January 20, 2024	0.415	0.05
137	47	"012624"	January 26, 2024	0.567	0.11
138	48	"012724"	January 27, 2024	0.527	0.08
139	49	"020224"	February 2, 2024	0.451	0.07
140	50	"020324"	February 3, 2024	0.529	0.07
141	51	"020924"	February 9, 2024	0.417	0.04
142	52	"021024"	February 10, 2024	0.533	0.05
143	53	"022324"	February 23, 2024	0.543	0.12
144	54	"022424"	February 24, 2024	0.575	0.10
145	55	"030124"	March 1, 2024	0.454	0.10
146	56	"030224"	March 2, 2024	0.476	0.04
147	57	"030824"	March 8, 2024	0.505	0.10
148	58	"030924"	March 9, 2024	0.483	0.07
149	59	"031524"	March 15, 2024	0.430	0.06
150	60	"031624"	March 16, 2024	0.465	0.07
151	61	"032224"	March 22, 2024	0.463	0.09
152	62	"032324"	March 23, 2024	0.448	0.06
153	63	"040524"	April 5, 2024	0.367	0.06
154	64	"040624"	April 6, 2024	0.354	0.05
155	65	"041224"	April 12, 2024	0.410	0.05
156	66	"041324"	April 13, 2024	0.474	0.08
157	67	"041924"	April 19, 2024	0.351	0.04
158	68	"042024"	April 20, 2024	0.389	0.04
159	69	"042624"	April 26, 2024	0.339	0.04
160	70	"042724"	April 27, 2024	0.453	0.09
161	71	"050324"	May 3, 2024	0.357	0.04
162	72	"050424"	May 4, 2024	0.433	0.05
163	73	"051024"	May 10, 2024	0.249	0.04
164	74	"051124"	May 11, 2024	0.396	0.07
165	75	"051724"	May 17, 2024	0.241	0.04
166	76	"051824"	May 18, 2024	0.361	0.06
167	77	"052424"	May 24, 2024	0.301	0.03
168	78	"052524"	May 25, 2024	0.322	0.06
169	79	"053124"	May 31, 2024	0.322	0.03
170	80	"060124"	June 1, 2024	0.383	0.03
171	81	"060724"	June 7, 2024	0.336	0.03
172	82	"060824"	June 8, 2024	0.436	0.04
173	83	"061424"	June 14, 2024	N/A	TBA
174	84	"061524"	June 15, 2024	0.487	0.05
175	85	"062124"	June 21, 2024	0.409	0.04
176	86	"062224"	June 22, 2024	0.360	0.04
177	87	"062824"	June 28, 2024	0.405	0.06
178	88	"062924"	June 29, 2024	0.427	0.06

==== Season 3 (2024-25) ====
No. overall	No. in season	Title	Original release date	U.S. viewers (millions)	Rating (18–49)
179	1	"071224"	July 12, 2024	0.380	0.05
180	2	"071324"	July 13, 2024	0.312	0.05
181	3	"071924"	July 19, 2024	0.386	0.06
182	4	"072024"	July 20, 2024	0.438	0.04
183	5	"072624"	July 26, 2024	0.356	0.03
184	6	"072724"	July 27, 2024	0.425	0.06
185	7	"080224"	August 2, 2024	0.478	0.06
186	8	"080324"	August 3, 2024	0.425	0.06
187	9	"080924"	August 9, 2024	0.345	0.04
188	10	"081024"	August 10, 2024	0.371	0.04
189	11	"081624"	August 16, 2024	0.469	0.07
190	12	"081724"	August 17, 2024	0.404	0.06
191	13	"082324"	August 23, 2024	0.385	0.06
192	14	"082424"	August 24, 2024	0.398	0.07
193	15	"091324"	September 13, 2024	0.363	0.04
194	16	"091424"	September 14, 2024	0.373	0.03
195	17	"092024"	September 20, 2024	0.310	0.04
196	18	"092124"	September 21, 2024	0.326	0.05
197	19	"092724"	September 27, 2024	0.319	0.04
198	20	"092824"	September 28, 2024	0.320	0.04
199	21	"100424"	October 4, 2024	0.298	0.04
200	22	"100524"	October 5, 2024	0.366	0.06
201	23	"101124"	October 11, 2024	0.421	0.08
202	24	"101224"	October 12, 2024	0.327	0.04
203	25	"101824"	October 18, 2024	0.325	0.05
204	26	"101924"	October 19, 2024	0.287	0.04
205	27	"102524"	October 25, 2024	0.303	0.05
206	28	"102624"	October 26, 2024	0.240	0.02
207	29	"110124"	November 1, 2024	0.326	0.06
208	30	"110224"	November 2, 2024	0.308	0.04
209	31	"110824"	November 8, 2024	0.453	0.09
210	32	"110924"	November 9, 2024	0.298	0.02
211	33	"111524"	November 15, 2024	0.262	0.02
212	34	"111624"	November 16, 2024	0.351	0.04
213	35	"112224"	November 22, 2024	0.302	0.04
214	36	"112324"	November 23, 2024	0.377	0.06
215	37	"112924"	November 29, 2024	0.261	0.03
216	38	"113024"	November 30, 2024	0.298	0.03
217	39	"120624"	December 6, 2024	0.276	0.05
218	40	"120724"	December 7, 2024	N/A	TBA
219	41	"121324"	December 13, 2024	0.326	0.03
220	42	"121424"	December 14, 2024	0.353	0.03
221	43	"122024"	December 20, 2024	0.263	0.02
222	44	"122124"	December 21, 2024	0.253	0.02
223	45	"011025"	January 10, 2025	0.356	0.05
224	46	"011125"	January 11, 2025	0.350	0.04
225	47	"011725"	January 17, 2025	0.306	0.04
226	48	"011825"	January 18, 2025	0.257	0.03
227	49	"012425"	January 24, 2025	0.324	0.05
228	50	"012525"	January 25, 2025	0.387	0.09
229	51	"013125"	January 31, 2025	0.316	0.04
230	52	"020125"	February 1, 2025	0.325	0.04
231	53	"020725"	February 7, 2025	0.324	0.04
232	54	"020825"	February 8, 2025	0.336	0.04
233	55	"021425"	February 14, 2025	0.272	0.02
234	56	"021525"	February 15, 2025	0.396	0.07
235	57	"022125"	February 21, 2025	0.252	0.03
236	58	"022225"	February 22, 2025	0.324	0.04
237	59	"022825"	February 28, 2025	0.283	0.05
238	60	"030125"	March 1, 2025	0.354	0.04
239	61	"030725"	March 7, 2025	0.293	0.05
240	62	"030825"	March 8, 2025	0.335	0.07
241	63	"031425"	March 14, 2025	0.253	0.03
242	64	"031525"	March 15, 2025	0.308	0.02
243	65	"032125"	March 21, 2025	0.268	0.03
244	66	"032225"	March 22, 2025	0.288	0.04
245	67	"032825"	March 28, 2025	0.214	0.03
246	68	"032925"	March 29, 2025	0.275	0.03
247	69	"041125"	April 11, 2025	0.247	0.03
248	70	"041225"	April 12, 2025	0.289	0.02
249	71	"041825"	April 18, 2025	0.213	0.03
250	72	"041925"	April 19, 2025	0.318	0.04
251	73	"042525"	April 25, 2025	0.253	0.03
252	74	"042625"	April 26, 2025	0.291	0.04
253	75	"050225"	May 2, 2025	N/A	TBA
254	76	"050325"	May 3, 2025	0.275	0.03
255	77	"050925"	May 9, 2025	0.205	0.03
256	78	"051025"	May 10, 2025	0.308	0.04
257	79	"051625"	May 16, 2025	0.227	0.04
258	80	"051725"	May 17, 2025	0.236	0.04
259	81	"052325"	May 23, 2025	0.165	0.01
260	82	"052425"	May 24, 2025	0.205	0.02
261	83	"053025"	May 30, 2025	0.225	0.04
262	84	"053125"	May 31, 2025	0.238	0.03
263	85	"060625"	June 6, 2025	0.235	0.04
264	86	"060725"	June 7, 2025	0.352	0.03
265	87	"061325"	June 13, 2025	0.207	0.02
266	88	"061425"	June 14, 2025	0.238	0.02
267	89	"062025"	June 20, 2025	0.217	0.03
268	90	"062125"	June 21, 2025	0.249	0.04
269	91	"062725"	June 27, 2025	0.270	0.03
270	92	"062825"	June 28, 2025	0.225	0.02

==== Season 4 (2025-26) ====
No. overall	No. in season	Title	Original release date	U.S. viewers (millions)	Rating (18–49)
271	1	"071125"	July 11, 2025	0.284	0.03
272	2	"071225"	July 12, 2025	0.267	0.04
273	3	"071825"	July 18, 2025	0.302	0.04
274	4	"071925"	July 19, 2025	0.263	0.03
275	5	"072525"	July 25, 2025	0.225	0.03
276	6	"072625"	July 26, 2025	0.216	0.03
277	7	"080125"	August 1, 2025	0.272	0.05
278	8	"080225"	August 2, 2025	0.273	0.04
279	9	"080825"	August 8, 2025	0.164	0.02
280	10	"080925"	August 9, 2025	0.244	0.04
281	11	"081525"	August 15, 2025	0.227	0.03
282	12	"081625"	August 16, 2025	0.321	0.05
283	13	"082225"	August 22, 2025	0.185	0.01
284	14	"082325"	August 23, 2025	0.260	0.02
285	15	"091225"	September 12, 2025	0.243	0.04
286	16	"091325"	September 13, 2025	0.213	0.02
287	17	"091925"	September 19, 2025	0.280	0.05
288	18	"092025"	September 20, 2025	0.220	0.04
289	19	"092625"	September 26, 2025	N/A	TBA
290	20	"092725"	September 27, 2025	N/A	TBA
291	21	"100325"	October 3, 2025	N/A	TBA
292	22	"100425"	October 4, 2025	N/A	TBA
293	23	"101025"	October 10, 2025	N/A	TBA
294	24	"101125"	October 11, 2025	N/A	TBA
295	25	"101725"	October 17, 2025	N/A	TBA
296	26	"101825"	October 18, 2025	N/A	TBA
297	27	"103125"	October 31, 2025	N/A	TBA
298	28	"110125"	November 1, 2025	N/A	TBA
299	29	"110725"	November 7, 2025	N/A	TBA
300	30	"110825"	November 8, 2025	N/A	TBA
301	31	"111425"	November 14, 2025	N/A	TBA
302	32	"111525"	November 15, 2025	N/A	TBA
303	33	"112125"	November 21, 2025	N/A	TBA
304	34	"112225"	November 22, 2025	N/A	TBA
305	35	"112825"	November 28, 2025	N/A	TBA
306	36	"112925"	November 29, 2025	N/A	TBA
307	37	"120525"	December 5, 2025	N/A	TBA
308	38	"120625"	December 6, 2025	N/A	TBA
309	39	"121225"	December 12, 2025	N/A	TBA
310	40	"121325"	December 13, 2025	N/A	TBA
311	41	"121925"	December 19, 2025	N/A	TBA
312	42	"122025"	December 20, 2025	N/A	TBA
313	43	"010926"	January 9, 2026	N/A	TBA
314	44	"011026"	January 10, 2026	N/A	TBA
315	45	"011626"	January 16, 2026	N/A	TBA
316	46	"011726"	January 17, 2026	N/A	TBA
317	47	"012326"	January 23, 2026	N/A	TBA
318	48	"012426"	January 24, 2026	N/A	TBA
319	49	"013026"	January 30, 2026	N/A	TBA
320	50	"013126"	January 31, 2026	N/A	TBA
321	51	"020626"	February 6, 2026	N/A	TBA
322	52	"020726"	February 7, 2026	N/A	TBA
323	53	"021326"	February 13, 2026	N/A	TBA
324	54	"021426"	February 14, 2026	N/A	TBA
325	55	"022026"	February 20, 2026	N/A	TBA
326	56	"022126"	February 21, 2026	N/A	TBA
327	57	"022726"	February 27, 2026	N/A	TBA
328	58	"022826"	February 28, 2026	N/A	TBA
329	59	"030626"	March 6, 2026	N/A	TBA
330	60	"030726"	March 7, 2026	N/A	TBA
331	61	"031326"	March 13, 2026	N/A	TBA
332	62	"031426"	March 14, 2026	N/A	TBA
333	63	"032026"	March 20, 2026	N/A	TBA
334	64	"032126"	March 21, 2026	N/A	TBA
335	65	"032726"	March 27, 2026	N/A	TBA
336	66	"032826"	March 28, 2026	N/A	TBA
337	67	"041026"	April 10, 2026	N/A	TBA
338	68	"041126"	April 11, 2026	N/A	TBA
339	69	"041726"	April 17, 2026	N/A	TBA
340	70	"041826"	April 18, 2026	N/A	TBA
341	71	"042426"	April 24, 2026	N/A	TBA
342	72	"042526"	April 25, 2026	N/A	TBA
343	73	"050126"	May 1, 2026	N/A	TBA
344	74	"050226"	May 2, 2026	N/A	TBA
345	75	"050826"	May 8, 2026	N/A	TBA
346	76	"050926"	May 9, 2026	N/A	TBA
347	77	"051526"	May 15, 2026	N/A	TBA
348	78	"051626"	May 16, 2026	N/A	TBA
349	79	"052226"	May 22, 2026	N/A	TBA
350	80	"052326"	May 23, 2026	N/A	TBA
351	81	"052926"	May 29, 2026	N/A	TBA
352	82	"053026"	May 30, 2026	N/A	TBA
353	83	"060526"	June 5, 2026	N/A	TBA
354	84	"060626"	June 6, 2026	N/A	TBA
355	85	"061226"	June 12, 2026	N/A	TBA
356	86	"061326"	June 13, 2026	N/A	TBA
357	87	"061926"	June 19, 2026	N/A	TBA
358	88	"062026"	June 20, 2026	N/A	TBA
359	89	"062626"	June 26, 2026	N/A	TBA
360	90	"062726"	June 27, 2026	N/A	TBA

==== Season 5 (2026) ====
No. overall	No. in season	Title	Original release date	U.S. viewers (millions)	Rating (18–49)
361	1	"071026"	July 10, 2026	N/A	TBA
362	2	"071126"	July 11, 2026	N/A	TBA
363	3	"071726"	July 17, 2026	N/A	TBA
364	4	"071826"	July 18, 2026	N/A	TBA
365	5	"072426"	July 24, 2026	N/A	TBA
366	6	"072526"	July 25, 2026	N/A	TBA
367	7	"073126"	July 31, 2026	N/A	TBA
368	8	"080126"	August 1, 2026	N/A	TBA
369	9	"080726"	August 7, 2026	N/A	TBA
370	10	"080826"	August 8, 2026	N/A	TBA
371	11	"081426"	August 14, 2026	N/A	TBA
372	12	"081526"	August 15, 2026	N/A	TBA
373	13	"082126"	August 21, 2026	N/A	TBA
374	14	"082226"	August 22, 2026	N/A	TBA
375	15	"082826"	August 28, 2026	N/A	TBA
376	16	"082926"	August 29, 2026	N/A	TBA
377	17	"091826"	September 18, 2026	N/A	TBA
378	18	"091926"	September 19, 2026	N/A	TBA
379	19	"092526"	September 25, 2026	N/A	TBA
380	20	"092626"	September 26, 2026	N/A	TBA
381	21	"100226"	October 2, 2026	N/A	TBA
382	22	"100326"	October 3, 2026	N/A	TBA
383	23	"100926"	October 9, 2026	N/A	TBA
384	24	"101026"	October 10, 2026	N/A	TBA
385	25	"101626"	October 16, 2026	N/A	TBA
386	26	"101726"	October 17, 2026	N/A	TBA
387	27	"103026"	October 30, 2026	TBD	TBA
388	28	"103126"	October 31, 2026	TBD	TBA
389	29	"110626"	November 6, 2026	TBD	TBA
390	30	"110726"	November 7, 2026	TBD	TBA
391	31	"111326"	November 13, 2026	TBD	TBA
392	32	"111426"	November 14, 2026	TBD	TBA
393	33	"112026"	November 20, 2026	TBD	TBA
394	34	"112126"	November 21, 2026	TBD	TBA
395	35	"112726"	November 27, 2026	TBD	TBA
396	36	"112826"	November 28, 2026	TBD	TBA
