= Catch 21 =

American game show

- Genre: Game show
- Created by: Merrill Heatter
- Written by: Michael J. Prescott
- Directed by: Debbie Miller (2008); Rob George (2009–10); Bob Levy (2010–11); Hal Grant (2019–20)
- Presented by: Alfonso Ribeiro
- Starring: Mikki Padilla; Witney Carson
- Theme music composer: Super Sonic Noise (2008–2010); Ian Honeyman; Vincent Ott (2019–2020)
- Country of origin: United States
- Original language: English
- No. of seasons: Original: 4; Revival: 1; Total: 5
- No. of episodes: Original: 300; Revival: 65; Total: 365

Production
- Executive producers: Merrill Heatter; Scott Sternberg; Jay Bienstock
- Production locations: Hollywood Center Studios; Hollywood, California (2008–11); Caesars Entertainment Studios; Las Vegas, Nevada (2019–20)
- Running time: 22–26 minutes
- Production companies: Scott Sternberg Productions (2008–11); Merrill Heatter Productions; Game Show Enterprises (2019–20)

Original release
- Network: Game Show Network
- Release: July 21, 2008 – July 1, 2011
- Release: October 14, 2019 – January 21, 2020

Related
- Gambit

Catch 21 is an American game show broadcast by Game Show Network (GSN). Created by Merrill Heatter (who also produced the show's predecessor Gambit), the series follows three contestants as they play a card game centered on combining blackjack with trivia. The show is based on a popular online game from GSN's website and aired for four seasons from 2008 to 2011. It was hosted by Alfonso Ribeiro, with actress Mikki Padilla serving as card dealer.

The show was revived on October 14, 2019, and concluded on January 21, 2020, with Ribeiro returning as host and Witney Carson as card dealer. Catch 21 received favorable critical reception for its format.

== Gameplay ==
=== Main game ===
==== 2008 version ====
Three contestants are each given a playing card to start a blackjack hand from a standard 52-card deck shuffled prior to taping. The host reads questions and the first contestant to answer correctly is dealt a card. The contestant who answers correctly can freeze their hand, preventing them from receiving additional cards or reveal the next card from the top of the deck.

After revealing the card, the contestant can either accept it for themselves or pass it to one of their opponents who has not yet frozen. If keeping a card, the contestant in control is given another chance to freeze. However, once a contestant has frozen, the remaining contestants must freeze at a score higher than that contestant; ties are not permitted. A contestant is eliminated from the round if their hand exceeds 21 ("busts").

The process is repeated with additional questions and cards until two contestants have frozen or busted. A contestant whose score reaches 21 exactly instantly wins the round. Beginning in season two of the original series, a bonus prize is given to the contestant regardless of the outcome of the game. If two contestants bust, the remaining contestant automatically wins the round. If only one contestant has not yet frozen or busted, no additional questions are asked; the remaining contestant continues drawing cards until either beating the highest frozen hand or busting. The winner of the round receives a power chip to use in the bonus round, assuming that contestant gets that far. The original series used point scores in the first two rounds, with 100 points awarded for a correct answer, and 500 points for winning the hand. After two rounds, the contestant with the lowest score is eliminated.

If there is a tie for the lowest score, the players involved participate in a high-card draw. Each player is given the choice of taking the first or second card off the top of the deck, without being able to see either card before making their selection. The player who draws the higher card advances.

The two remaining contestants play one more round involving the same toss-up question format, but point scores are not kept. The contestant who wins the round receives $1,000 and two additional power chips (originally one), then moves on to the bonus round.

==== 2019 revival ====
The 2019 revival changed several aspects of the game:

- Other than the cards, there is no point scoring in any round.
- The question and answers are shown on-screen. Also, the contestants must wait until the entire question is read to ring in.
- There is no longer a bonus prize for the first 21.
- If two players win the first two hands, those two players play the third round, and the third player is eliminated. If the same player wins the first two hands, a tiebreaker is played between the other two players.
- In the tiebreaker ("High Card Playoff"), an additional trivia question is played. The player who answers correctly is shown the top card from the deck and chooses whether to take that card or pass it to their opponent and take the next card from the deck. The other player is given the second card; the higher card wins. (If there is a tie, an additional question is played.)
- Winning the final round gives the player their required number of power chips based on the hand or hands they have won. On some episodes, the player is given an additional chip for winning the match.

=== Bonus round ===
The winner now controls three separate hands, each staked with one card. A new deck of 52 cards that has been shuffled and cut is used. Cards are drawn for the contestant, one at a time and the contestant then chooses a hand in which to place each card. The contestant can use a power chip to dispose of an unwanted card. If the contestant is in danger of busting on any hand, the contestant can end the round after successfully placing a card if a 21 is scored in at least one hand; a contestant cannot stop immediately after playing a power chip. Getting 21 in one hand wins $1,000, in two hands wins $5,000, and if 21 is scored on all three hands, the contestant wins the grand prize of $25,000. If the contestant busts on any one hand, the bonus money is forfeited and the game ends. On some episodes in season two, the top prize was doubled to $50,000 with the other payouts remaining the same.

The 2019 revival has altered the payout structure to a 21 on one hand awarding $2,500, $5,000 for two, and $25,000 for all three. Unlike the 2008 version, payouts replace the money won from the main game instead of keeping such money and adding the bonus winnings.

=== Online game ===
The television version of the game was based on a popular online version from GSN's website. In this version, the online player has five minutes to make as many hands of 21 as they can using four columns. The player can play a card in any of their columns as long as the subsequent total is 21 or less. If the card cannot be played in any column, it must be discarded. Each hand of 21 earns the player 50 points. Playing exactly five cards in a column earns the player a 50-point bonus (called a "5-Card Charlie"), making that column worth a total of 100 points. Additionally, the jacks of spades and clubs allow any column to be cleared immediately for 75 points (called a "Blackjack Attack").

== Production ==
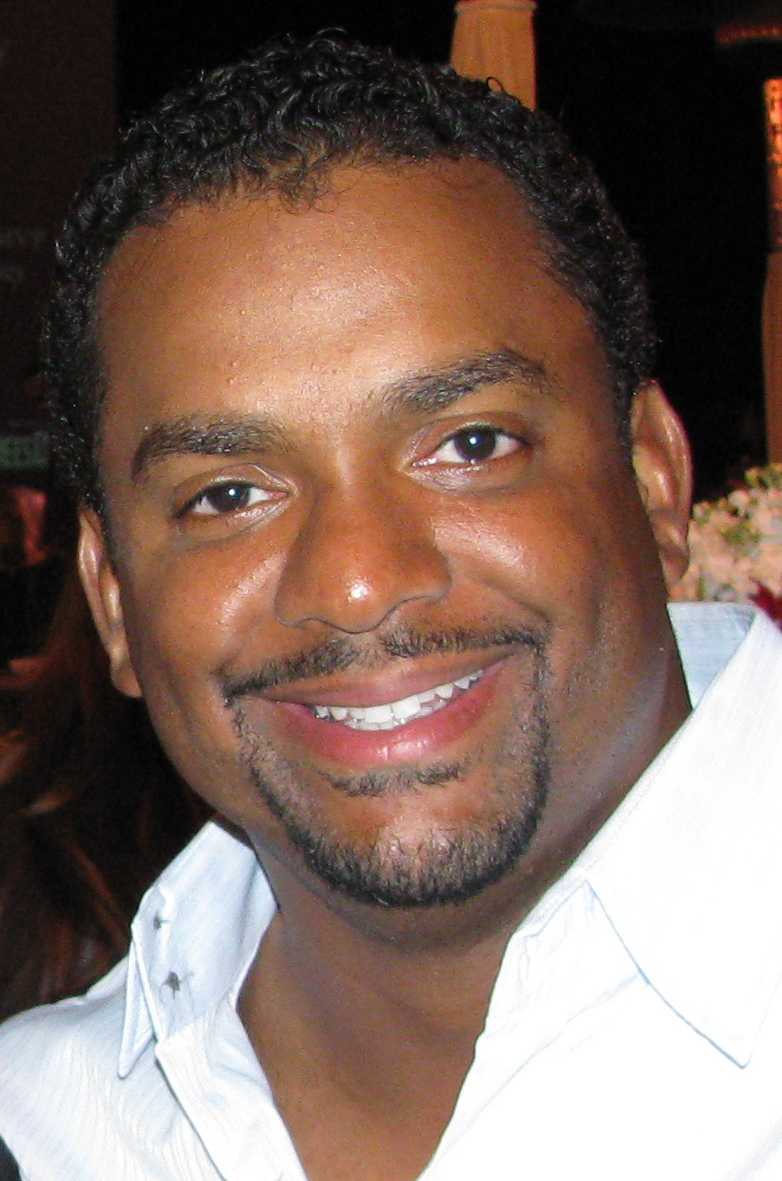
Alfonso Ribeiro, host of both versions

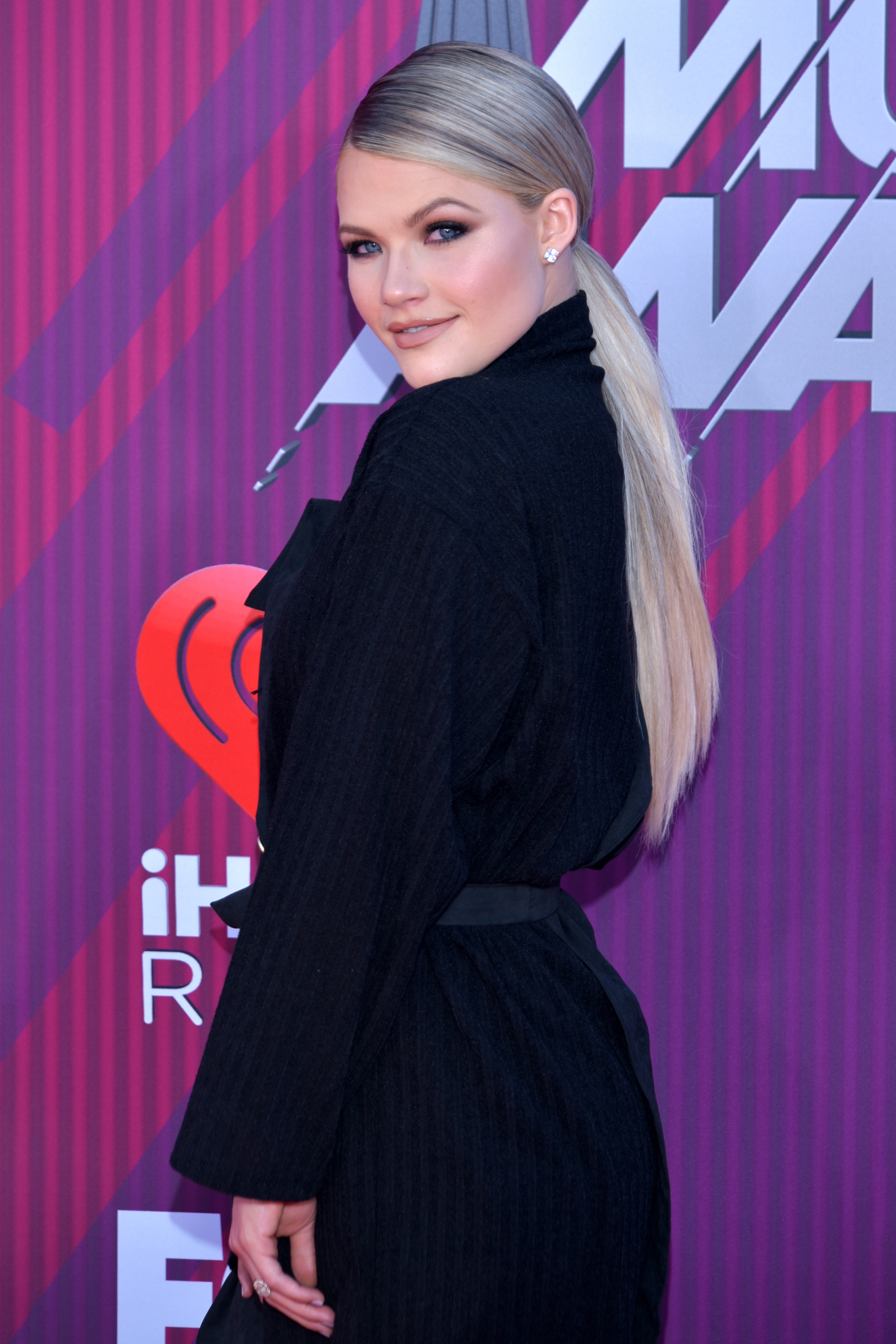
Witney Carson, card dealer in the 2019 revival

The series is executive produced by Scott Sternberg and Merrill Heatter, and premiered on July 21, 2008. The first season consisted of 40 half-hour episodes. Prior to the show's premiere, a 30-minute documentary The Making of a Game Show: Catch 21 aired on GSN, featuring exclusive footage and interviews with production staff and Ribeiro. The name of the show is inspired by Catch-22, a phrase describing a paradox that cannot be avoided due to limits or a rules contradiction.

On February 18, 2009, GSN renewed the series for a 65-episode second season on April 6, 2009, which featured the addition of an extra power chip in the bonus round in order to increase contestant's chances of winning the top prize. A third season was announced on September 16, 2009, and debuted on October 12, 2009, with some episodes featuring celebrities with a common bond (such as three The Fresh Prince of Bel-Air cast members or three former child stars) playing for charity. The show's fourth and final season premiered on August 16, 2010.

On March 21, 2019, Adweek reported that GSN would revive Catch 21, producing new episodes for the first time in nearly a decade. Ribeiro returned as host; Padilla, however, would not return and was replaced by dancer Witney Carson. The change reunited Ribeiro and Carson, who had previously been partners—and champions—on season nineteen of Dancing with the Stars. Contestants cast for the revival were current residents of Las Vegas, where the show is filmed. The revival filmed its episodes in July and August, and premiered on GSN on October 14, 2019.

== Reception ==
Critical reception for Catch 21 was generally positive. Carrie Grosvenor of About Entertainment argued that the series was "a fun game with a solid concept. It's definitely worth checking out." Hollywood Junket also praised Ribeiro, calling him "hands-down, one of the best game show hosts out there... the fun, brother/sister type chemistry between himself and (Padilla) is rare and benefits the show greatly." Additionally, Bounce TV expressed excitement when announcing their acquisition of the series in 2013, citing the series' popularity among GSN viewers and consistent ratings growth during its original run. The network's chief operating officer Jonathan Katz commented, "We are very confident that the broadcast premieres of The American Bible Challenge and Catch 21 will add fuel to Bounce TV's skyrocketing growth." The revival's October 14, 2019, premiere earned 459,000 total viewers with a 0.04 rating in the 18–49 demographic.

== See also ==
- Gambit
