= Talk or Walk =

- Genre: Talk show
- Created by: Scott Sternberg
- Directed by: Barry Glazer
- Presented by: Michael Baisden
- Country of origin: United States
- Original language: English
- No. of seasons: 1

Production
- Producer: Scott Sternberg
- Running time: approx. 48 minutes
- Production companies: Scott Sternberg Productions; Tribune Entertainment

Original release
- Network: Syndicated
- Release: 2001 – 2002

Talk or Walk is an American one-hour daytime talk show/ relationship show recorded in Los Angeles, California which aired daily on television between late 2001 and January 2002 when it went out of syndication following the November 2001 ratings sweep— only one season was ever recorded, and through the week ending November 18 it earned only a 0.7 national household rating, well within the typical cancellation territory of the four major American television networks. The show was hosted by Michael Baisden, directed by Barry Glazer, produced by Scott Sternberg, and distributed by Tribune Entertainment.

Under themes such as, "Is This Marriage on the Rocks?", the premise of the program was that two people who had been in a relationship were going to decide to continue to "talk" about that relationship or "walk" away from it, with questions asked by the show's host and its studio audience. At the end of the segment the pre-arranged decision was announced.
