= Gossip Cop =

- Website type: Celebrity News Pop Culture
- Owner: Gossip Cop Media
- Creator: Michael Lewittes (Co-Founder)
- Website: http://www.gossipcop.com/
- Launched: July 29, 2009
- Current status: Defunct

Gossip Cop was a website that fact-checked celebrity reporting. Based in New York City, Gossip Cop investigated entertainment stories that were published in magazines and newspapers, as well as on the web, to ascertain whether they are true or false. To help visitors quickly identify the truth value of every story, the site featured a 0-10 scale next to each article. A rating of 0 meant the rumor is completely untrue, fiction or even fake news, while a rating of 10 meant the report was 100 percent fact or true. Gossip Cop participated in International Fact-Checking Network events, including attending Global Fact 4 in Madrid in July 2017, Global Fact 5 in Rome in June 2018, and Global Fact 6 in Cape Town in June 2019.

The website was created by Michael Lewittes, a veteran entertainment journalist. During his 25-year career, Lewittes has served as an "Access Hollywood" producer, the news director for Us Weekly, an editor at the New York Post, and a columnist for the New York Daily News. A graduate of Yale College, Lewittes was also a correspondent on the E! series, "The Gossip Show."

Along with one-time co-founder Dan Abrams, Lewittes launched the site on July 29, 2009 with appearances on Good Morning America and The Today Show. As a result, Gossip Cop received a tremendous amount of publicity, including features in The New York Times and People Magazine. The site was known for its dogged investigations. In November 2017, Elle magazine called Gossip Cop "the Robert Mueller of the celebrity news world.".

In 2019, Gossip Cop was acquired by Quillt Media, formerly Gateway Blend, from Lewittes, who independently owned the company until August of that year.

In September 2021, Gossip Cop was merged with website Suggest.com and the Gossip Cop site was redirected to Suggest. Suggest continued to produce content debunking tabloid stories, as Gossip Cop had, until September 2022 when the practice was discontinued completely.
