= Crime Exposé with Nancy O'Dell =

American true crime television series

- Genre: Documentary; True crime
- Created by: Scott Sternberg; Hank Cohen
- Presented by: Nancy O'Dell
- Country of origin: United States
- No. of seasons: 3

Production
- Executive producers: Hank Cohen; Pamela Covais; Nancy O'Dell; Scott Sternberg
- Producers: Kevin Barry; Allan Duffin
- Editors: Billy Abramson; Gregory Costa; Victoria English; Cara Rouse; Greg Socher
- Running time: 19 minutes
- Production companies: Scott Sternberg Productions; Trifecta Entertainment & Media; The Tornante Company

Original release
- Network: First-run syndication
- Release: September 23, 2024 – present

Related
- iCrime with Elizabeth Vargas

Crime Exposé with Nancy O'Dell (formerly under the working name Crime Stories with Nancy O’Dell) is an American true crime documentary television series created by Scott Sternberg and Hank Cohen (who also created iCrime with Elizabeth Vargas) and hosted by Nancy O'Dell that premiered on September 23, 2024.

== Synopsis ==
The show covers one murder per episode, going through investigations of the crimes and how it was solved using interviews of the family of the victims, witnesses, court records and the law officials.

At the end of the episode, there's a segment called Safety Spotlight, a safety tip by the series’ law enforcement safety contributor.

== Production ==
In February 2024, Broadcasting & Cable announced two new true crime shows for the 2024-25 television syndication season with this show (under the name Crime Stories with Nancy O’Dell) and True Crime News.

In June 2024, it was announced that the show was cleared to 95% of the country under the current name Crime Exposé with Nancy O'Dell. The same day, it was also announced that the show's premiere date would be on September 23.

== Streaming ==
As of 2025, the first season is streaming free on Tubi and The Roku Channel (although only one episode is on the site).
