= Wheel 2000 =

American children's game show (1997–1998)

- Also known as: Wheel of Fortune 2000
- Genre: Game show
- Created by: Scott Sternberg
- Based on: Wheel of Fortune by Merv Griffin
- Directed by: James Marcione
- Presented by: David Sidoni
- Voices of: Tanika Ray as "Cyber Lucy"
- Theme music composer: Dan Sawyer
- Country of origin: United States
- Original language: English
- No. of seasons: 1
- No. of episodes: 24

Production
- Executive producer: Scott Sternberg
- Producers: Adam Tyler; Pamela Covais
- Production locations: Sony Pictures Studios, Culver City, California
- Running time: approx. 22–26 minutes
- Production companies: Scott Sternberg Productions; Trackdown Productions; Columbia TriStar Television

Original release
- Network: CBS; Game Show Network
- Release: September 13, 1997 – February 7, 1998

Wheel 2000 (also known as Wheel of Fortune 2000) is a children's version of the American game show Wheel of Fortune. The show was produced by Scott Sternberg Productions and Columbia TriStar Television, and is the most recent version of Wheel of any sort to air on daytime network television. The show was created by Scott Sternberg and was hosted by comedian David Sidoni (from Nickelodeon's sketch comedy show Roundhouse), with actress Tanika Ray providing voice work and motion capture for a virtual reality co-host named "Cyber Lucy".

The show premiered on September 13, 1997, on CBS, aired as part of the network's attempt to meet the then-new E/I mandates during its Saturday morning block, and ran through February 7, 1998, with repeats continuing through September 26. Game Show Network broadcast Wheel 2000's episodes concurrently with their airings on CBS. It was taped at Sony Pictures Studios.

== Gameplay ==
The gameplay of Wheel 2000, similarly to Wheel of Fortune, features three contestants competing to fill in a word puzzle similar to those of hangman. Unlike on the regular version, Wheel 2000 features child contestants competing for points and prizes instead of cash. At the start of each round, the contestant in control is presented an option of three categories. As on the regular version of the show, the contestants spin an oversized roulette-styled wheel and call consonants. Calling a correct consonant earns the amount of points landed on, multiplied by the number of times the letter appears in the puzzle. As on the standard version, a contestant who has called a correct consonant may choose to spin again or buy a vowel for 250 points if any remain. Games are typically played to three rounds, with top point values of 1,000, 2,000, and 5,000.

The wheel also features "The Creature" and "Loser", respectively renamings of the original show's Bankrupt and Lose a Turn wedges; these end the current contestant's turn, with the former also eliminating all points for the round. The Creature is also represented by a smoke machine and sound effects. Multiple spaces on the wheel also featured the names of various physical challenges and stunts. If a contestant landed on one, he or she would be required to do a physical stunt with a pre-determined goal, such as attempting to feed an animatronic dinosaur or throwing stuffed toys at matching shapes on a game board. Every successful goal within the stunt awards a randomly-selected letter with a maximum of three, after which the contestant may choose to reveal any of the letters at 250 points per occurrence or spin again. Failing to earn any letters through a stunt results in a lost turn. The wheel also features a number of prizes which may be claimed by calling a correct letter; Double Up, which is normally valued at 500 points per letter but is doubled to 1,000 points if the contestant correctly answers a trivia question first; and a wedge labeled with the show's website, wheel2000.com, which awards merchandise to a randomly-selected viewer who has entered a form online. As with the standard version of the show, contestants must solve the puzzle to claim any points. Matches are typically played to three rounds.

The show's puzzle board is computer-generated, and letters fill in automatically upon being called. After a puzzle is solved, the contestants are shown a short educational film relevant to the answer, (usually explained by Lucy, but sometimes accompanied by a celebrity via a prerecoded video). The player also automatically receives a glamorous prize (a video game console, stereo, amusement park tickets etc.), no matter what their outcome is for the rest of the program for solving a puzzle (similar to that of the original version of Wheel of Fortune). If a player solves with no points for that round, they automatically receive 500 points.

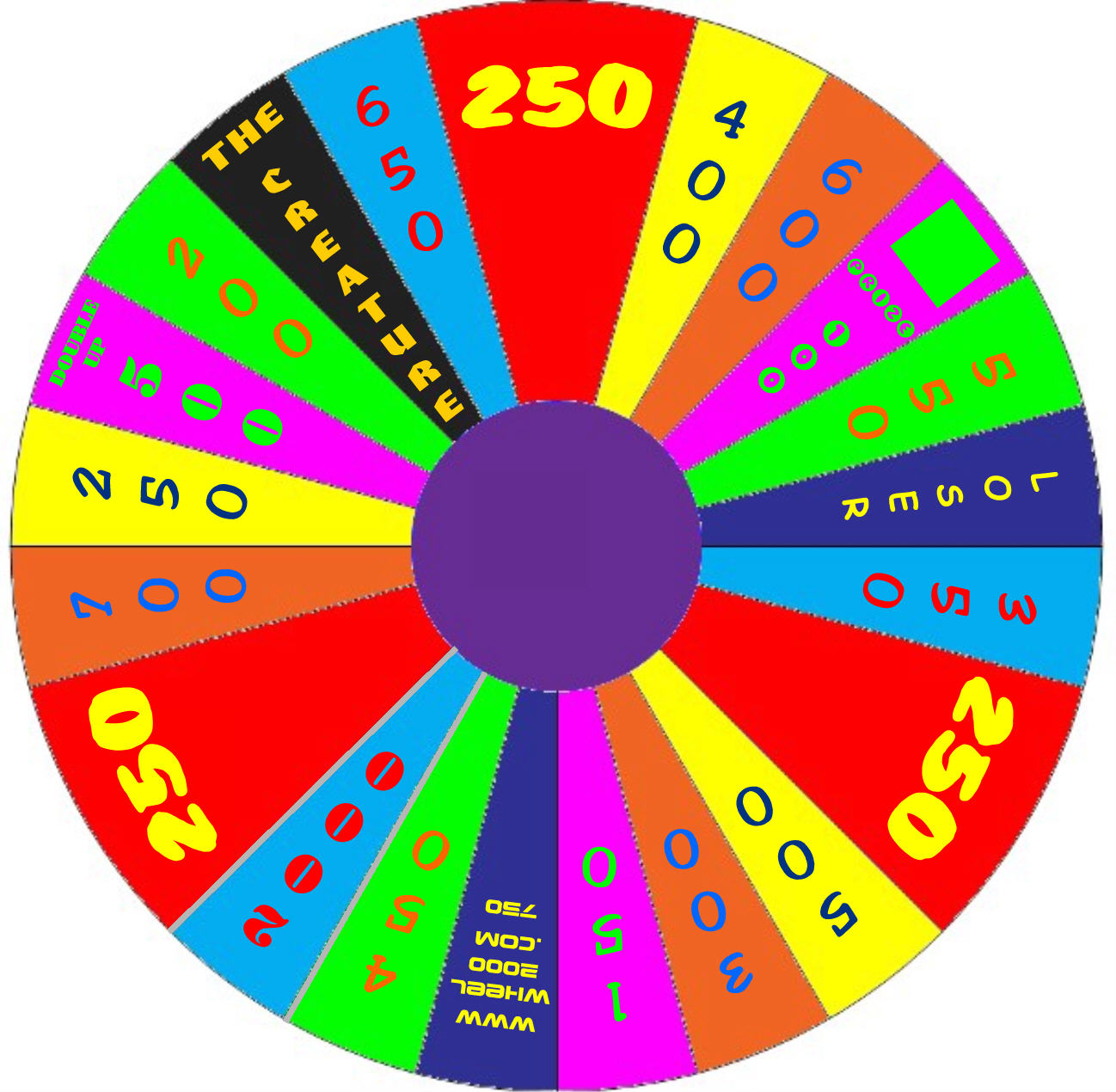
The Round Two layout used on Wheel 2000, with 2,000 as the top point value

The winner of the competition, (the player who has the most points usually after three puzzles. A tie breaker face off puzzle is played if one or more players have the same amount of points) plays a bonus round largely identical to the syndicated version. The contestant draws a prize from one of two envelopes and is presented a category, and a puzzle for which every instance of the letters R, S, T, L, N, and E is revealed. Afterward, the contestant provides three more consonants and a vowel, which are revealed if any of them are in the puzzle; they then have ten seconds in which to solve for the prize drawn.

== Personnel ==
David Sidoni was the show's host. His co-host was "Cyber Lucy", a computer-generated figure who appeared adjacent to the puzzle board. Her voice and motion capture were both provided by Tanika Ray.

== 13-city tour ==
In early 1998, Wheel 2000 made a 13-city tour, appearing in shopping malls around the country. The Discover-branded tour, coordinated by the Chicago office of New Jersey–based promotion agency DVC Group, also featured Sidoni as host, with Ray as Lucy joining him again. The tour visited a variety of major market cities: Chicago, Philadelphia, Pittsburgh, Washington, D.C., New York City, Charlotte, Dallas, Denver, Salt Lake City, Seattle, Indianapolis, San Jose, and Anaheim. Winners from each market were invited to appear as contestants on the program in a grand finale.

== Revival ==
On June 8, 2023, Sony Pictures Television announced that another children's version of Wheel is in development.

== International versions ==
Country	Local name	Host	Network	Aired
Germany	Kinder-Glücksrad	Petra Hausberg	Sat.1	1992–1993
Spain	La Ruleta de la Fortuna Junior	Silvia Ruiz	Telecinco	1998–1999
Turkey	Çark 2000	Ataman Erkul	Kanal D	2000
Vietnam	Chiếc nón kỳ diệu	Phan Tuấn Tú	VTV3	2007–2009
