= Elizabeth Vargas =

American television journalist

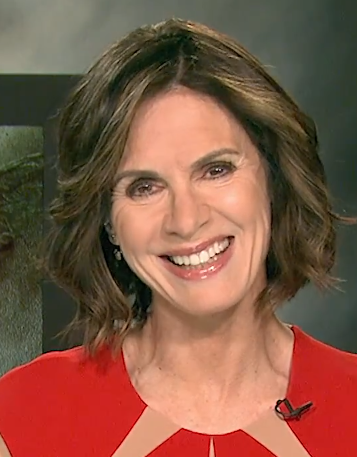
- Vargas in 2018
- Born: Elizabeth Anne Vargas; September 6, 1962 (age 64); Paterson, New Jersey, U.S.
- Education: University of Missouri
- Occupation: Television journalist
- Years active: 1993–present
- Known for: Co-anchor of ABC World News Tonight; Co-anchor for 20/20; Host of America's Most Wanted (2021)
- Spouse: Marc Cohn (m. 2002; div. 2014)

Elizabeth Anne Vargas (born September 6, 1962) is an American television journalist who is the lead investigative reporter/documentary anchor for A&E Networks, and was the host for Fox's revival of America's Most Wanted (2021). She began her new position on May 28, 2018, after being an anchor of ABC's television newsmagazine 20/20 and ABC News specials for the previous 14 years. She is also a news anchor for NewsNation, where she hosts Elizabeth Vargas Reports, currently based in New York City

In 2006 Vargas was co-anchor of World News Tonight alongside ABC News journalist Bob Woodruff.

== Early life and education ==
Elizabeth Anne Vargas was born in Paterson, New Jersey, the daughter of an Italian-Spanish father, Rafael "Ralf" Vargas, a colonel in the United States Army from Puerto Rico, and an Irish-American mother, Anne Vargas, a part-time English teacher. She has two siblings, Aimie and Christopher, who both work in tech in Silicon Valley. Her father was a U.S. army captain and moved the family to Okinawa when she was four years old. Vargas then spent much of her youth moving from post to post in Germany, Belgium, and the United States. Vargas graduated from Heidelberg American High School in Heidelberg, Germany, where she realized her passion for journalism.

Vargas enrolled at the University of Missouri in Columbia in 1980 and graduated with a bachelor's degree in journalism in 1984, having served as a student reporter at KOMU-TV and a student editor at KBIA. Former advisors spoke well of her competency in her journalism work on campus; Rod Gelatt, former KOMU news director, noted that she was the first student to ever fill in for him as moderator of the station's Missouri Forum public affairs program and Kent Collins, chairman of the university's journalism faculty, remembered her "aggressive and energetic" work ethic.

== Career ==
=== 1984–1993: Career beginnings ===
After college, Vargas worked at CBS affiliate KTVN in Reno, Nevada, before moving to Phoenix, Arizona, as a lead reporter for then-ABC affiliate KTVK-TV. After three years there, she moved to Chicago to work at CBS station WBBM-TV, where Phyllis McGrady, a senior vice president at ABC, said of her: "Elizabeth is one of the most flexible talents I've ever worked with. She could do interviews, and do hour-long specials that make you think, and then she'll do a great interview with P. Diddy. She is versatile." Vargas left WBBM-TV in 1993.

=== 1993–1996: NBC News ===
In 1993, Vargas joined NBC News as a correspondent for Now with Tom Brokaw and Katie Couric. She later became a correspondent mainly for Dateline NBC, and also served as a substitute anchor for Today and the weekend editions of NBC Nightly News.

=== 1996–2018: ABC News ===
In June 1996, she joined ABC News' Good Morning America as the newsreader and Joan Lunden's likely "heir apparent". In June 1997, ABC promoted Vargas to prime time magazine show correspondent, succeeded by Kevin Newman as newsreader. In 2002, she became one of the anchors of 20/20 Downtown, which was later rebranded Downtown before being rebranded again in 2003 as Primetime Monday before its end. She later reported occasionally for Primetime. She was also named anchor of World News Tonight Saturday and presented with the opportunity to develop specials for Primetime. In November 2003, Vargas became anchor of World News Tonight Sunday. She was named co-anchor of 20/20 in May 2004.

Vargas was the first national evening news anchor of Puerto Rican and Irish-American heritage and also the third female anchor of a network evening newscast in the US since Connie Chung and Barbara Walters. She is said to be "particularly proud" of an ABC special report in which she questioned why the Laci Peterson case merited more attention than two other similar cases, one involving a black woman and the other involving a Hispanic woman. Another story, based on the book The Da Vinci Code and the role of Mary Magdalene, helped fuel a nationwide religious debate. Vargas stated that for centuries Mary Magdalene has been portrayed as a prostitute by the church despite evidence to the contrary. She went on to question the limited role of women within the Catholic church. In 1999, she won an Emmy Award for her coverage of the Elián González story, and in 1998 she was nominated for an Emmy Award for her 20/20 investigation into the wrongful conviction of Betty Tyson.

In April 2005, Vargas and Charles Gibson temporarily filled in for Peter Jennings, who was receiving chemotherapy for lung cancer, on World News Tonight until Jennings's death in August. After a period of mourning and indecision, she and Bob Woodruff were chosen as co-anchors on December 5, 2005. She anchored many broadcasts alone after Woodruff's injury in Iraq in January 2006. She also co-anchored World News Tonight with either Charles Gibson or Diane Sawyer.

On May 23, 2006, Vargas announced her resignation from World News Tonight. Gibson was then named sole anchor of the show, effective from May 29, 2006, replacing Vargas and Woodruff. To explain the sudden change, Vargas cited her doctors' recommendation to considerably cut back her schedule owing to a difficult pregnancy and her wish to spend more time with her new baby when he arrived. Most inside accounts, however, said she fully expected and wished to return to the anchor chair soon after giving birth, but Gibson threatened to quit ABC News if he was not made sole permanent anchor. According to these sources, his gambit succeeded and she was left embittered, although not enough to sever ties with the network. In late 2006, Vargas returned as co-anchor of 20/20 and primary host of ABC News specials. In 2008, Vargas hosted Elvis: Viva Las Vegas, a documentary that explored Elvis Presley's triumph in Las Vegas and his artistic legacy, and featured performances and interviews with various stars, including Paul McCartney, Beyoncé, Dwayne Johnson, Faith Hill, David Lynch, Jon Bon Jovi, Celine Dion, and Priscilla Presley.

In 2013, Vargas won a Peabody Award for her contributions in ABC News' coverage of Hurricane Sandy on 20/20.

In a special edition of 20/20 that aired on September 9, 2016, Vargas opened up about her struggles with anxiety and alcoholism and further talked about her upcoming book Between Breaths: A Memoir of Panic and Addiction, which discusses those struggles. In October 2016, she appeared in an episode of ABC's Designated Survivor.

Vargas officially departed ABC on May 25, 2018, after a dedication on 20/20.

=== 2018–present: A&E Investigates and America's Most Wanted ===
In April 2018, A&E Originals signed Vargas to a first-look and production deal. Vargas would serve as the anchor of its A&E Investigates banner for new non-fiction prime-time journalism programming. She broadcast her first A&E Investigates series, Cults & Extreme Belief, in May 2018. The Untold Story, a series focusing on the untold stories of influential people and events, premiered in April 2019. In January 2021, it was confirmed that Vargas would host a revival of America's Most Wanted on Fox, which premiered on March 15, 2021.

Vargas was formerly the anchor of News Cafe on A&E's FYI Network.

On September 19, 2022, Vargas guest anchored NewsNation Prime during the week until September 23, 2022. Vargas then became the host of a syndicated true crime series shortly after called iCrime with Elizabeth Vargas.

On January 10, 2023, it was announced that Vargas would host a new show on NewsNation, titled Elizabeth Vargas Reports, which premiered on April 3, 2023.

== Personal life ==
Vargas has explained that despite her multi-ethnic heritage, she identifies with her Hispanic roots. She is fluent in English and Spanish and proficient in French.

On July 20, 2002, Vargas married singer-songwriter Marc Cohn after three years of dating. They have two sons, Zach and Sam. Vargas also has two stepchildren, Max and Emily, from Cohn's first marriage. In August 2014, Entertainment Tonight reported that Vargas and Cohn were divorcing after 12 years of marriage.

Vargas was introduced to Transcendental Meditation in 2014 by fellow ABC anchor George Stephanopoulos.

=== Alcoholism ===
Vargas's lifelong battle with alcohol stemmed from anxiety rooted in her childhood. After her father joined the Vietnam War, she began suffering daily panic attacks. She was told early on that she should hide her anxiety to avoid appearing weak, but this only intensified the problem and her addiction to alcohol. During a family vacation in 2012, she realized she needed help. She sought treatment in Utah, but departed prematurely and eventually relapsed.

On November 6, 2013, ABC confirmed a New York Daily News story that Vargas was undergoing treatment for alcoholism in Tennessee. "I am dealing with addiction," Vargas said. Once again, Vargas left the rehabilitation program too soon, but quickly realized it was a mistake. Within a week, she returned for treatment for a third time. Shortly after coming home, she and husband Marc Cohn divorced.

On January 24, 2014, Vargas described herself as an alcoholic. Over the next few years, she wrote Between Breaths: A Memoir of Panic and Addiction. Her book was published by Grand Central Publishing on September 13, 2016, and became an instant New York Times and USA Today best-seller.

In 2018, NBC News reported that Vargas had been sober since 2014.

== See also ==
- History of women in Puerto Rico
- Irish immigration to Puerto Rico
- List of Irish Americans
- List of Puerto Ricans
- New Yorkers in journalism

Media offices
| Preceded by Peter Jennings | ABC World News Tonight Co-Anchor with Bob Woodruff; January 3, 2006 – May 26, 2006 | Succeeded by Charles Gibson |
| Preceded by Barbara Walters | 20/20 herself 2009–2018, 2004–2009; With: John Stossel 2004–2009 | Succeeded by David Muir (2013–present); Amy Robach (2018-23) |
