= Scott Sternberg =

- Born: Levy, South Carolina, U.S.
- Occupation: Television producer

Scott Sternberg is an American television producer and head of Scott Sternberg Productions.

== Career ==
In 1978, Sternberg produced the documentary Science Fiction Film Awards, which he also wrote.

During the 1980s, he directed the television series Everything Goes (which he also produced) and Chuck Berry: Live at the Roxy with Tina Turner, produced The Wolfman Jack Radio Show and The New Hollywood Squares, and executive produced The All-New Dating Game and the 1988 revival of The Gong Show. He also produced the DJ Music Awards in 1980.

In the 1990s, Sternberg wrote, executive produced and directed the documentary The Road to Hollywood, hosted and executive produced the game show Let's Go Back, and executive produced The Quiz Kids Challenge, Wheel 2000, Jep!, As Seen On, Extreme Gong, Solo en America, and Great Pretenders.

Sternberg remained active in the 2000s, executive producing Lover or Loser, Go For It! TV, Catch 21, Talk or Walk, The Academy, That's the Question, and various other series. He went on to be executive producer of Shatner's Raw Nerve and On the Case with Paula Zahn. He has partnered with Trifecta Entertainment & Media to produce various series including Protection Court and ICrime with Elizabeth Vargas.

Their debut venture into documentary production began with Mötley Crüe's Vince Neil: My Story on Reelz Channel.
