= Mikki Padilla =

American actress

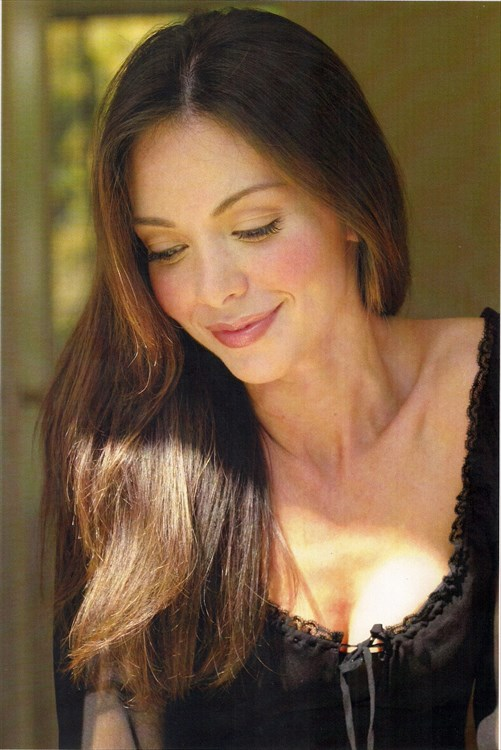
- Born: May 27, 1974 (age 51); Denver, Colorado, U.S.
- Occupations: Actress, model, writer, author
- Years active: 1999–present

Mikki Padilla (born May 27, 1974) is an American actress, model, writer and author. She has since filmed several projects, commercials, and her book, Been There, Done That... now doing MORE! was released in March 2013. She was the co-host and dealer of the GSN game show Catch 21 from 2008 to 2011.

== Early life and start ==
Padilla born in Denver, Colorado to Evie and Ernie Padilla. When Padilla was four, her parents moved to Santa Fe, New Mexico. By the time she was in sixth grade, her parents divorced but remained friends. Her stepfather, Cristobal Chavez, also became friends with her father. She started her acting career in the 2001 Japanese movie Séance. After her appearance in the film, she got small television and movie roles. She was a model for Avon Products, and was one of the brand's top five Latina models.

== Literature/publications ==
- Been There, Done That... now doing MORE! (2013)

== Filmography ==
Year	Title	Role	Notes
2001	Seance	Sylvia Vasquez	
2002	Martin Lawrence Live: Runteldat	Showbiz News Anchor	
2003	Malcolm in the Middle	Groupie #2	Episode: "Malcolm Holds His Tongue"
2004	The Deviants	Daisy	
2005	Star Party	Trisha	
2005	NCIS	Leanne Roberts	Episode: "The Voyeur's Web"
2006	Ghost Hunters: Point of Contact	Elaine Libby	
2007	Pool Party	Maria	
2007	Urban Justice	Chivo's Girlfriend	
2008	Pranksters	Brenda 'Dreamgirl'	
2008	Two and a Half Men	Bridesmaid #1	Episode: "Rough Night in Hump Junction"
2010	The Grind	Val	
2011	Circles of Life	Leticia	Short
2012	Hair N Now	Nikki	
2015	Sand Snowman	Kirilova	Short
2015	Dark Moon Rising	Vasha	
2015	The Young and the Restless	Bystander	Episode: "#1.10770"
TBA	Dark Cupid	Lucy	Post-production
