= On Patrol: Live =

American docuseries about policing

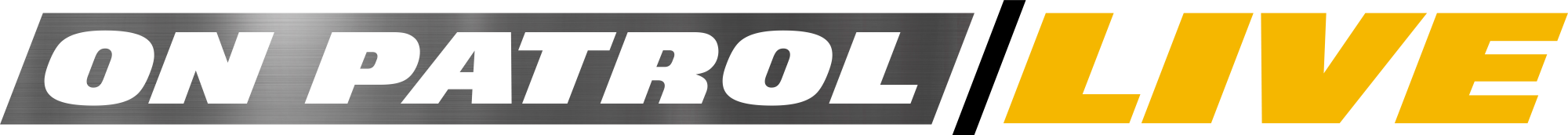
- Logo since 2023
- Genre: Reality; Docuseries
- Presented by: Dan Abrams; Sean "Sticks" Larkin; Curtis Wilson; Tom Rizzo; Tom Morris Jr.
- Country of origin: United States
- Original language: English
- No. of seasons: 5
- No. of episodes: 396 (list of episodes)

Production
- Executive producers: Dan Cesareo; John Zito; Dan Abrams; Lucilla D'Agostino; Paul Gordon; Joe Venafro; Rob Swartz
- Camera setup: Multiple
- Running time: 128–177 minutes
- Production company: Half Moon Pictures

Original release
- Network: Reelz
- Release: July 22, 2022 – present

Related
- Live PD; On Patrol: First Shift

On Patrol: Live is an American reality television and docuseries that airs on the cable and satellite television network Reelz. It follows camera crews going on ride-alongs with law enforcement agencies in the United States. The series is produced by Half Moon Pictures, a subsidiary of the same company that produced Live PD for A&E.

It premiered on July 22, 2022. On Patrol: Live is hosted by Dan Abrams and retired Tulsa Police Department Sergeant Sean "Sticks" Larkin, who both returned from Live PD, along with newcomer Curtis Wilson, a deputy with the Richland County Sheriff's Department. Captain Tom Rizzo from the Howell Township Police Department replaced Larkin following his regular departure.

A&E later filed a lawsuit against the series, network, and production companies claiming copyright infringement. A&E Television Networks LLC v. Big Fish Entertainment LLC was eventually settled out of court. The series performed strongly in viewing numbers and frequently won its targeted age demographic.

A companion series containing a preview of each night's show, called On Patrol: First Shift, airs an hour before On Patrol: Live; it premiered on August 12, 2022. In January 2026, an additional 90 episodes of On Patrol: Live were ordered, which will keep the show on the air through January 2027.

Season five premiered on July 10, 2026.

== Overview ==
On Patrol: Live rides along with various law enforcement agencies across the United States and broadcasts their interactions. The live broadcasts are supplemented by additional footage recorded by camera crews throughout the preceding week. Commentary is provided by host Dan Abrams alongside analysts Sean "Sticks" Larkin and Curtis Wilson. Additional segments in each episode include "Missing", for which the series partners with the National Center for Missing & Exploited Children and the Black and Missing Foundation, "Crime of the Night" (originally titled "Crime of the Week"), and "Wanted".

In the second season the latter two segments were replaced by "Triple Play" and "BOLO". Ashleigh Banfield and Matt Iseman periodically serve as fill-in hosts for Abrams'. Other law enforcement officials have stood in for Larkin and Wilson. Following Larkin's regular departure, a series of guest analysts appeared before the role was permanently filled by Tom Rizzo. Despite this, Larkin has still periodically appeared, in the absence of or alongside Abrams, Wilson or Rizzo.

== Episodes ==
Season	Episodes	Originally released	
Season	Episodes	First released	Last released
1	96	July 22, 2022	July 15, 2023
2	88	July 21, 2023	June 30, 2024
3	92	July 12, 2024	June 28, 2025
4	90	July 11, 2025	June 27, 2026
5	TBA	July 10, 2026	TBA

== Production ==
=== Background ===
Dan Abrams
(@danabrams)
tweeted:

Shocked & beyond disappointed about this. To the loyal #LivePDNation please know I, we, did everything we could to fight for you, and for our continuing effort at transparency in policing. I was convinced the show would go on. . More to come. . .

Jun 10, 2020

A&E television network pulled four original episodes of Live PD from the schedule that were set to air the weekend of May 29–30, and June 5–6, 2020. At the time, A&E cited the May 25 murder of George Floyd and subsequent protests as the primary reason stating it was "out of respect for the families of George Floyd and others who have lost their lives". On June 9, host Dan Abrams stated in a tweet "all of us associated with the show are as committed to it as ever" and was confident the series would return to air. A day later on June 10, it was reported that the network had destroyed footage of police action in the killing of Javier Ambler.

The series had routinely been filming additional footage outside of its live broadcast for later use, and was riding-along with the Williamson County Sheriff's Department on the day of the killing. After the initial investigation had concluded producers followed policy and destroyed the footage on the orders of Sheriff Robert Chody, an action for which he was later charged. As a response to the two incidents, and Paramount Network's cancelling of Cops, A&E and production company Big Fish Entertainment jointly decided to cancel the series and its associated programs with the possibility to reboot it in the future.

=== Development ===
A month before its cancellation, Live PD had been renewed for an additional 160 episodes. Its timeslot was later filled by spin-off series Live Rescue. In August 2020, Abrams reported that he was actively advocating for the series to return. Abrams also said that "active discussions" to bring Live PD back were occurring and its return would have protocol changes. These reports by Abrams continued into 2021 when he said it would return that year. This statement was partially retracted in December, when Abrams said other networks had expressed interest in the series, but that he still hoped to see a future return.

In the year following the cancellation, A&E's viewership dropped 49% becoming the 20th ranked ad-supported cable channel by total viewers, compared to its previous rank of 8th. Abrams confirmed once more in March 2022 that these conversations were still ongoing and that it would be unlikely to air on his Law&Crime television network due to budget constraints.

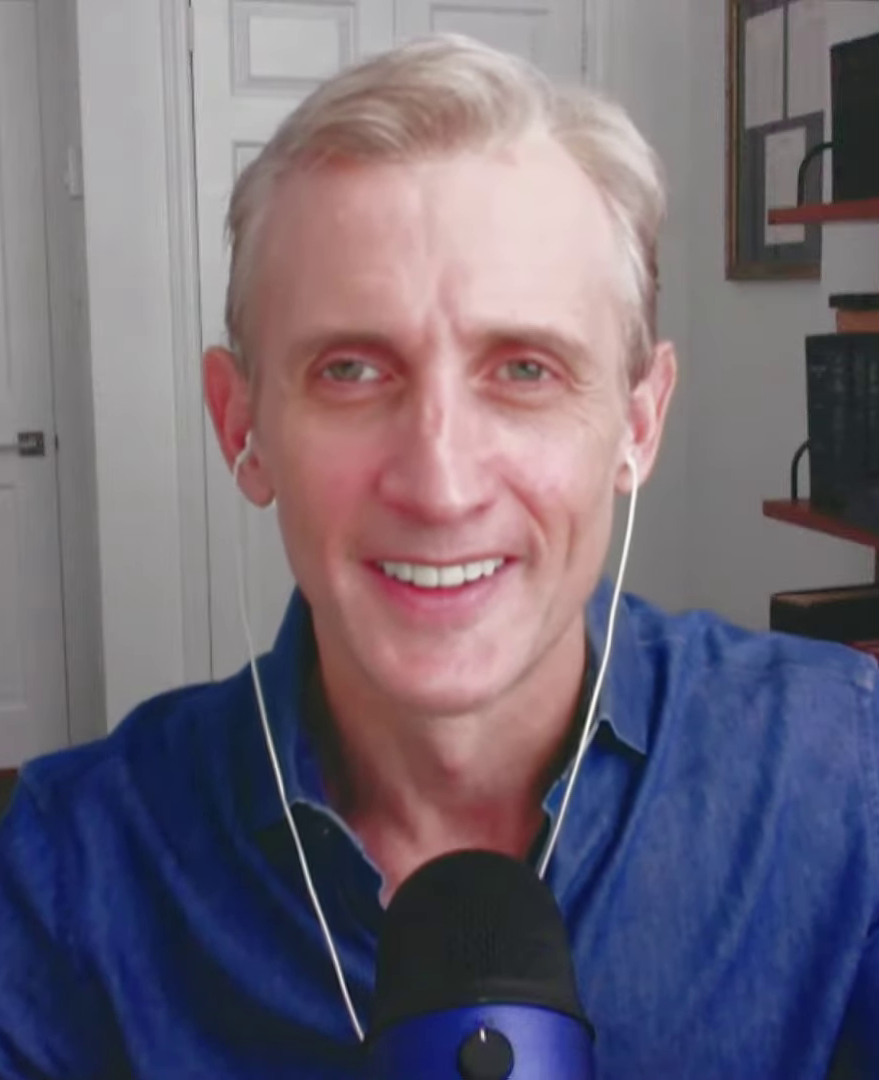
Dan Abrams returned as host after advocating for the series to return between 2020 and 2022.

In June 2022, the series was revived under the title On Patrol: Live, airing on Reelz. Reelz signed a multi-year commitment for the series containing a "significant episode guarantee", with a network executive mentioning it was "the biggest commitment we've ever made". Similar to Live PD, the series follows police officers on patrol and broadcasts their encounters live. A new aspect of On Patrol: Live includes local citizens also riding-along with the law enforcement officers and media crews. The series airs on a time delay for "safety and security purposes"; the delay is elastic and can be as little as a "few minutes" but possibly up to 30 minutes. Any footage obtained earlier than 30 minutes is acknowledged on air. Dan Abrams and retired Tulsa Police Department Sergeant Sean "Sticks" Larkin returned to host. Tom Morris Jr. was unable to return due to scheduling and was replaced by Curtis Wilson. Wilson is a sheriff's deputy with the Richland County Sheriff's Department and was suggested for the role by Morris; Wilson had previously been involved with Live PD's "Wanted" segments.

Abrams, who also retained his role as executive producer on the series, said "more exceptions" would be made in deciding which footage to retain past the 30-day policy, believing that the previous rules were too strict. Abrams also stated that the series would be more focused on transparency than Live PD was. John Zito, also returning from Live PD, alongside Paul Gordon and Joe Venafro are additional executive producers. MGM Television's Big Fish Entertainment returned as a production company under its new subsidiary, Half Moon Pictures, which "is focused on crime and investigative content".

On Patrol: Live was renewed for an additional 90-episodes on February 14, 2023, which kept the series on the air through January 2024. The initial 60-episode order would have expired with the February 25, 2023, episode of the series. Larkin reported in July 2023 that he would scaling back his time on the series to "enjoy time with family, friends and other adventures". During this time a series of guest hosts appeared on the series while Larkin began hosting a new series on Fox Nation titled Crime Cam 24/7. He had previously hosted PD Cam, a similar series and spinoff of Live PD between 2018 and 2020. Executive producer Dan Cesareo departed MGM Alternative in July of 2023. Cesareo left after his five-year deal signed that began in 2018. This resulted in the sale of Big Fish Entertainment to Amazon MGM Studios. Cesareo will continue to oversee On Patrol: Live alongside his successor Lucilla D'Agostino. D'Agostino has been in sole charge of Big Fish Entertainment, Evolution Media and Half Moon Productions since 2023. Another set of 90-episodes were ordered on January 12, 2024, which comprised the series third season and ran through January 2025.

Following his regular departure, Larkin's position was later filled by Tom Rizzo, from the Howell Township Police Department. On January 28, 2025, an additional order of 90-episodes was announced, covering On Patrol: Live's fourth season over 270 hours of programming. In January 2026, an additional 90 episodes of On Patrol: Live were ordered, which will keep the show on the air through January 2027.

=== A&E Networks lawsuit ===
A&E Television v. Big Fish Entertainment
- Court: United States District Court for the Southern District of New York
- Full case name: A&E Television Networks LLC v. Big Fish Entertainment LLC

Outcome
- Settlement

Court membership
- Judge sitting: Katherine Polk Failla

A&E Networks, the parent company of the A&E network, filed a lawsuit in August 2022, against Reelz, Big Fish Entertainment, and Half Moon Pictures, alleging that it was a "blatant rip-off" of Live PD, infringed on their intellectual property, and calling for the series to stop production. According to the court filing, A&E retained all rights to commission new episodes of the series and had not authorized Reelz or Big Fish Entertainment to continue production. Prior to its airing A&E sent Reelz cease-and-desist letters which they say were ignored, with the exception of a name change from its working title of PD Live, a reverse of Live PD.

The lawsuit further says that On Patrol: Live features many of the same segments as Live PD; as well as similar graphics, captions, and credits. It also mentions that the series airs in the same timeslot, tarnishes A&E's reputation as a result of technical difficulties, and confuses viewers due to news articles describing it as an official revival. Reelz responded to a request for comment stating that "ReelzChannel, LLC, has not been served with nor had an opportunity to review the Complaint in detail, and thus has no comment at this time beyond denying liability and expressing its ongoing commitment to On Patrol: Live."

Big Fish Entertainment disputed A&E's allegations of copyright violations, calling the lawsuit "meritless" in a December 2022 court filing and stating "A&E is free to air another live police show. A&E also is free to air reruns of old Live PD episodes. A&E is not free, however, to use the copyright and trademark laws to stop Live PD’s creators from taking their talents elsewhere, after A&E turned its back on them, merely because it came to regret that choice. A&E’s lawsuit should be dismissed in full, with prejudice.”

Despite the lawsuit, A&E and Big Fish continue to cooperate on production of Court Night Live, a court show which has served as a de facto "spiritual successor" replacement of Live PD. In 2023 a motion was filed by Big Fish Entertainment to dismiss the case which was denied by U.S. District Judge Katherine Polk Failla in June. Failla stated that while the individual elements of both series do not meet the requirements for copyright protection, the mix of elements as a whole are. This allowed A&E to begin discovery of evidence; required the defendants to reply by July 7, and instructed "all parties to file a joint status letter" by July 21, 2023.

The case was settled out of court in November 2024. In the settlement, A&E signed a non-exclusive agreement with Amazon (MGM Television's parent company) to add expanded A&E content on Amazon's Prime Video in the United States, the United Kingdom, and Japan, which includes new FAST channels, new title availability, and an add-on subscription. A&E, Big Fish Entertainment, and Reelz jointly stated, "A+E Networks and Amazon have agreed to significantly expand their commercial relationship in a multi-year agreement that will amplify the reach of A+E Networks' brands and content on Amazon’s Prime Video service. In connection with that agreement, the legal dispute between A+E and Big Fish Entertainment and Reelz concerning Live PD has been resolved."

== Release and reception ==
=== Broadcast ===
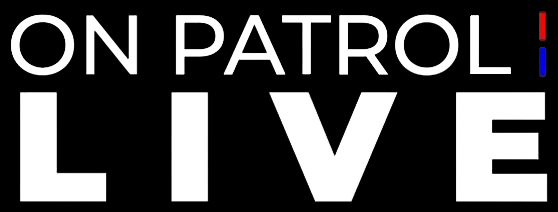
Logo and title card used in the first season (2022–2023)

The series airs on Reelz and premiered on July 22, 2022. It airs weekly on Fridays and Saturdays and is broadcast live for three hours from 9:00 p.m.–12:00 a.m. Eastern Time (ET). The premiere episode began broadcasting 70-minutes after its scheduled start time due to technical difficulties. After initially showing dead air, repeated commercials were shown for a documentary about the band Kiss set to air the following Sunday, and ending in two rerun episodes of Jail: Las Vegas. This episode ultimately began airing at 10:15 p.m. and was broadcast in its entirety without television advertisements. The following episode also briefly began with dead air, but the issue was fixed quickly.

Reelz signed an agreement with the streaming provider Peacock to carry the channels linear feed live beginning in March 2023. The deal also allows the series as well as First Shift to be streamed on-demand the day after its live broadcast. An additional fourth hour of the programme was broadcast following the normal episode June 29, 2024, airing through 1:00 a.m. ET on June 30.

=== Critical response ===
Prior to the series airing, Adrian Horton, writing for The Guardian, opined that the revival was a "backslide" in policing reform and criticized the lack of need for subjects to sign consent forms due to its categorization as a news organization. Horton also said that despite Abrams declaration of further transparency in the series, no change would be enough to satisfy its flaws.

Writing in the Albuquerque Journal, the paper's editorial board took issue with a segment in which a Bernalillo County deputy, accompanied by one of the show's camera crews, responded to a traffic accident. The board opined that the show is "spotlight[ing] crime and victimiz[ing] victims" and that taxpayers risk getting "humiliated on TV and subsequently mocked on social media in the name of entertainment". The editorial board encouraged the Bernalillo County Sheriff's Office Advisory and Review Board to recommend the department's cooperation with On Patrol: Live be ended. On January 5, 2023, the Sheriff's Office announced they would be "taking a break" from the show; the county has not been featured on the show since.

Following the premiere weekend, Brittany Frederick from Comic Book Resources wrote that despite being similar to its predecessor, On Patrol: Live failed to capture the same "frantic energy". She specifically mentioned that Wilson didn't measure up to the former dynamic held between Abrams, Larkin, and Morris. Frederick later explained that she believed the series needed unique elements rather than attempting to be an exact copy of Live PD.

=== Viewing figures ===
The series premiered to strong ratings, winning the 25–54 year-old demographic during its first two episodes with 397,000 and 403,000 viewers, respectively. Reelz also reported that it had 121 million impressions across social media platforms and trended on Twitter. Throughout the seven telecasts broadcast in its opening weekend, the series achieved a total of 3.5 million viewers. In its second week, the series surpassed viewership of competing Shark Week programming on Discovery Channel and once again won the 25–54 demographic. By August 10, 2022, the series totaled 6.8 million viewers and 1.8 billion minutes throughout its twenty-seven telecasts.

At the time of the series first renewal in February 2023, it was averaging over 800,000 same-day viewers an episode. Viewership on Reelz increased 270% in 2022, and 34% in 2023, as a result of On Patrol: Live. Reelz was considered to be one of the top 40 cable channels by 2025, which was considered to be a result of adding the series to its programming slate. At this time, they reported that their total primetime audience had risen 292% after adding the show even though ratings have dropped significantly since the show's premiere in 2022.

== On Patrol: First Shift ==
On Patrol: First Shift is a companion series that serves as a lead-in to each new airing of On Patrol: Live. The series is co-hosted by Abrams, Larkin, and Wilson; the three preview new episodes of the parent series, provide additional analysis on previous episodes, and answer viewer questions.

=== Episodes ===
Season	Episodes	Originally released	
Season	Episodes	First released	Last released
1	90	August 12, 2022	July 15, 2023
2	88	July 21, 2023	June 29, 2024
3	92	July 12, 2024	June 28, 2025
4	90	July 11, 2025	June 27, 2026
5	TBA	July 10, 2026	TBA

== See also ==
- Cops (TV program)
