= Court Cam =

American documentary courtroom television series

- Genre: Documentary
- Presented by: Dan Abrams
- Country of origin: United States
- Original language: English
- No. of seasons: 9

Production
- Executive producers: Dan Abrams; Paul Kaup
- Running time: 21 minutes
- Production companies: Law & Crime Productions; Trifecta Entertainment & Media (syndication)

Original release
- Network: A&E
- Release: December 5, 2019 – present

Court Cam is an American documentary television series hosted by Dan Abrams that airs premiered on A&E on December 5, 2019. The series has currently aired nine seasons, and has been in broadcast syndication since September 11, 2023, under the distribution of Trifecta.

== Overview ==
Dan Abrams commentates on closed circuit television footage of courtrooms, interrogation rooms and other public buildings, and the events which occur in each clip, which may include the description of the case, the defendant's previous criminal history, if any, and the fate of their case, with a generic disclaimer that guilt is not implied for events still in the legal process. The participants in each case, including lawyers, witnesses and victims and rarely, the judge themselves, though usually local reporters or contributors to Abrams's Law & Crime Network and their commentary are the main commentators on each clip.

== Format ==
When the show first aired in 2019, Abrams conducted interviews with guests in person. In the second season, because of the COVID-19 pandemic, remote interviews began to be blended in. After the third season, there have been no more interviews that Abrams was able to conduct.
