= Trifecta Entertainment & Media =

American entertainment company

- Industry: Television syndication
- Founded: 2006; 20 years ago
- Headquarters: Los Angeles, California; New York, New York
- Number of locations: 2
- Website: trifectaentertainment.com

Trifecta Entertainment & Media is an American entertainment company founded in 2006. The company's founders previously held jobs as executives at MGM Television. Trifecta is primarily a distribution company and also handles advertising sales in exchange for syndication deals with local television stations, cable outlets, and digital media. The company also produces television programs and made-for-TV and direct-to-video movies. The company has offices in Los Angeles, California and New York City, New York.

== Titles distributed by Trifecta Entertainment & Media ==
=== Current ===
==== Programs ====
- The Carbonaro Effect
- Celebrity Page (formerly OK!TV)
- Court Cam
- Crime Exposé with Nancy O'Dell
- The First 48
- Forensic Files
- iCrime with Elizabeth Vargas
- Live PD Presents
- Pawn Stars
- Protection Court
- Small Town Big Deal
- Whacked Out Sports
- Whacked Out Videos

==== Movies ====
- Lionsgate Studios
- Paramount Pictures (pre-1928 and post-1949 films)
  - DreamWorks Pictures (pre-2010 films)
  - Television rights to films from The Cannon Group, Inc., Epic Productions, 21st Century Film Corporation and Nelson Entertainment under license from Amazon MGM Studios, and Carolco Pictures under license from StudioCanal
  - Rysher Entertainment film catalog including titles from Bing Crosby Productions
  - Miramax film catalog including titles from the pre-2005 Dimension Films library
  - Cinema Center Films
  - CBS Films (pre-2015 catalog)
  - CBS Theatrical Films
  - Skydance Media
- Screen Media Films (Now owned by Magnolia Pictures)

=== Former ===
==== Programs ====
- America Now
- American Idol Rewind
- Animal Atlas (2009–2011)
- Animal Exploration with Jarod Miller
- The Best of Soul Train (December 2007 – September 2008)
- Bloopers
- Cheaters
- Cold Case Files
- Cookie Jar TV (ad sales)
- Dish Nation
- Dog the Bounty Hunter
- Eco Company (ad sales)
- Elvira's Movie Macabre
- Future Phenoms (ad sales)
- The Game Plane
- Impractical Jokers
- Hollywood Shootout
- Jack Hanna's Animal Adventures
- Judge Faith
- Last Shot with Judge Gunn
- Leverage
- M@dAbout TV (ad sales)
- Million Dollar Challenge (ad sales)
- MTV series:
  - Punk'd
  - Laguna Beach
  - The Hills
  - The City
  - MTV Cribs
- NASCAR Angels
- Republic of Doyle
- Saf3
- Mystery Hunters
- Smithsonian Channel
- Sports Stars of Tomorrow (ad sales)
- Star Wars: The Clone Wars (2012–2013)
- Storage Wars
- Storm Stories
- UFC Wired

==== Movies ====
- DreamWorks Animation (pre-2013 films) - sold to NBCUniversal Television Distribution in 2018
