= ICrime with Elizabeth Vargas =

American reality clip television show

iCrime with Elizabeth Vargas
- Genre: Reality television; Clip show
- Created by: Scott Sternberg; Hank Cohen
- Presented by: Elizabeth Vargas
- Country of origin: United States
- No. of seasons: 5
- No. of episodes: 477

Production
- Executive producers: Hank Cohen; Scott Sternberg; Eric Mazer; Elizabeth Vargas
- Running time: 19 minutes
- Production companies: Scott Sternberg Productions; Trifecta Entertainment & Media

Original release
- Network: First-run syndication
- Release: September 12, 2022 – present

Related
- Crime Exposé with Nancy O'Dell

iCrime with Elizabeth Vargas is an American reality clip television show hosted by Elizabeth Vargas and premiered on September 12, 2022.

== Synopsis ==
The show features video clips of crimes caught on camera or mobile devices by everyday people and the host interviews the victims, eyewitnesses, law-enforcement officials or the filmers themselves; and a group of real crime experts. The show takes a look at the phenomenon of technology intersecting with crime in the world.

== Production ==
In June 2022, Deadline reported that the syndicated true crime show would air in 95% of the country starting in September. The series comes from Scott Sternberg Productions (who also did ID’s On the Case with Paula Zahn) and Trifecta Entertainment & Media. This is one of few syndicated shows premiering in fall 2022, joining talk shows hosted by Sherri Shepherd and Jennifer Hudson.

Trifecta will handle all domestic distribution and its president, Michael Daraio, will be in charge of all advertising and sponsorship sales for the show and Scott Sternberg Productions will be responsible for international sales.

In mid-2023, the show was renewed for a second season which premiered on September 11, 2023.

In February 2024, the show was renewed for a third season and premiered on September 9, 2024. During this time, the set was revamped and a new show-runner was brought in.

== Reception ==
The show received a Nielsen rating of 0.5/4.

== Streaming ==
As of 2024, the first season is free to watch on the official YouTube channel.
