= Dan Abrams =

American entrepreneur, television host, and lawyer (born 1966)

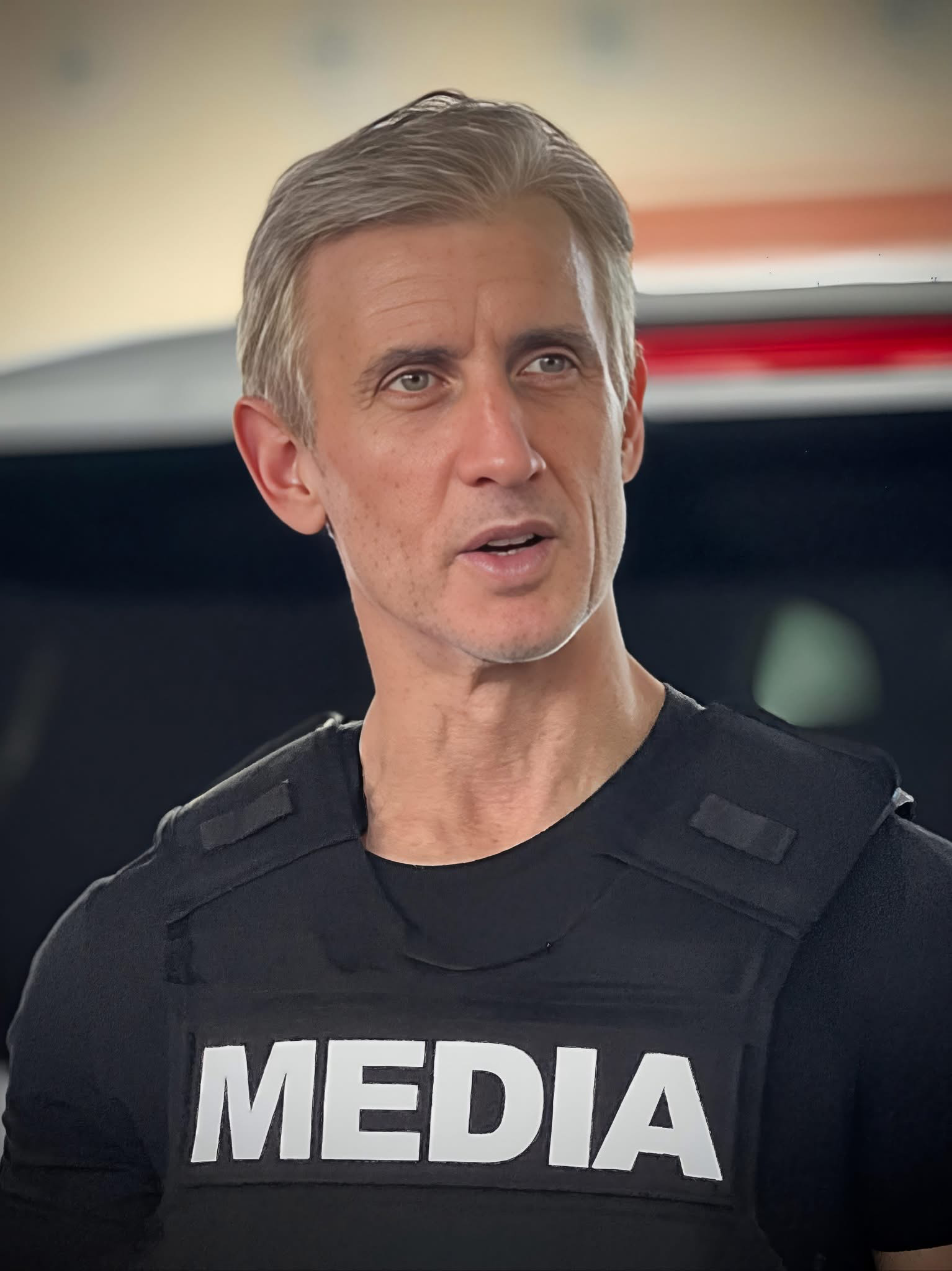
- Abrams in 2025
- Born: Daniel Abrams; May 20, 1966 (age 60); New York City, U.S.
- Education: Duke University (BA); Columbia University (JD)
- Occupations: Television presenter, businessman
- Title: CEO, Abrams Media
- Partner: Florinka Pesenti
- Children: 2
- Parents: Floyd Abrams (father); Efrat Abrams (mother)
- Relatives: Ronnie Abrams (sister); Elliott Abrams (cousin)

Daniel Abrams (born May 20, 1966) is an American media entrepreneur, television host, and author. He is currently the host of On Patrol: Live on Reelz, and The Dan Abrams Show: Where Politics Meets the Law on SiriusXM's P.O.T.U.S. channel. He is also the Chief Legal Analyst of ABC News. In 2021, he became the host of the primetime show Dan Abrams Live on NewsNation, which had its last episode in February 2025.

Abrams was the host of Live PD on the A&E cable network and created and hosts Court Cam, a Law & Crime production on A&E. He was formerly an anchor of Nightline. Abrams also worked as the chief legal correspondent and analyst for NBC News and general manager of MSNBC and was a substitute anchor for the same network.

== Early life ==
Abrams was born and raised in Manhattan, New York City; he is Jewish, one of two children of Efrat Abrams and Floyd Abrams, a First Amendment lawyer. His younger sister, Ronnie Abrams, is a United States district judge of the United States District Court for the Southern District of New York.

Abrams received a bachelor's degree in political science from Duke University and a J.D. from Columbia Law School.

== Career ==
=== Television and broadcasting ===
Abrams started his career working at Court TV, where he covered the O. J. Simpson case, the International Criminal Court from the Netherlands, and the assisted-suicide trials of Dr. Jack Kevorkian from Michigan.

In 1997, Abrams left Court TV to serve as a general assignment correspondent for NBC News where he was later named Chief Legal Correspondent. Abrams then began hosting The Abrams Report in 2001. After 5 years, he accepted the top managerial position at MSNBC, which he ultimately left in order to concentrate on his program Live with Dan Abrams. This show would eventually be revamped and renamed Verdict with Dan Abrams, which aired until August 21, 2008.

In March 2011, Abrams left NBC to become the Chief Legal Analyst for ABC News and a substitute anchor on Good Morning America. In 2013, Abrams became the network's Chief Legal Affairs Anchor, as well as an anchor of Nightline. He stepped down from his full time role as Nightline anchor in December 2014 to focus on his media businesses, and returned to his freelance role as the network's Chief Legal Analyst.

In 2016, Abrams became the host of Live PD. Aired on A&E, the show offered live coverage of on-duty police. Live PD was canceled on June 10, 2020, in the wake of protests against police brutality following the murder of George Floyd.

In 2018, A&E named Abrams co-host of Grace vs. Abrams, in which Abrams and legal commentator Nancy Grace debated high-profile crime cases. The following year, Abrams signed on to produce and host Court Cam, a series featuring courtroom video footage.

In 2021, Abrams joined NewsNation to host a nightly prime-time show called Dan Abrams Live. On December 19, 2024, Abrams announced that he would end his show effective in February 2025, though he would remain with the network.

In 2022, Abrams became host and executive producer for On Patrol: Live, a new show on Reelz following the same format as A&E's cancelled Live PD.

=== Business initiatives ===
In September 2009, Abrams started Mediaite, a media-news and commentary site.

That same year, Abrams launched Gossip Cop, a website devoted to correcting the record on celebrity gossip. In 2019, Gossip Cop was acquired by Gateway Blend.

In 2010, Abrams launched SportsGrid, a website offering a mix of sports news, video clips and other media tracking both sports and the media world surrounding it. SportsGrid was acquired by Anthem Media Group in a stock and cash deal in 2013.

In 2011, Abrams Media started The Mary Sue, a partner site to Geekosystem focused on women in geek culture and aimed at amplifying women's voices in that space. Abrams folded Geekosystem into The Mary Sue in 2014. On November 17, 2021, The Mary Sue was sold to GAMURS Group.

Abrams started LawNewz, a legal news website which also live streams trials as part of its online network, in 2016. The new live trial network, promoted as the new Court TV, launched on February 24, 2017, with A&E Networks taking a stake in the site. In 2017, LawNewz was rebranded to Law & Crime. In October 2023, Abrams sold Law&Crime to video content startup Jellysmack for a reported $125 million.

In 2024, Abrams launched Bottle Raiders, a website that aggregates reviews and ratings of spirits and non-alcoholic drinks. Bottle Raiders was rebranded as The Daily Pour in 2025.

=== Writing ===
In March 2010, Abrams published the Washington Post bestseller Man Down: Proof Beyond a Reasonable Doubt That Women Are Better Cops, Drivers, Gamblers, Spies, World Leaders, Beer Tasters, Hedge Fund Managers and Just About Everything Else. He then co-wrote a series of books about forgotten trials. In 2018, he released his second book, Lincoln’s Last Trial: The Murder Case That Propelled Him to The Presidency. The book was a New York Times bestseller and received the 2018 Barondess/Lincoln Award.

Abrams’ third book, Theodore Roosevelt for the Defense: The Courtroom Battle to Save His Legacy, was published on May 21, 2019, followed by John Adams Under Fire: The Founding Father's Fight for Justice in the Boston Massacre Murder Trial, in 2020, and Kennedy's Avenger: Assassination, Conspiracy, and the Forgotten Trial of Jack Ruby in 2021.

Abrams’ sixth book, Alabama v. King: Martin Luther King Jr. and the Criminal Trial That Launched the Civil Rights Movement, was published in 2022.

=== Restaurants ===
Abrams was a co-owner with David Zinczenko of the restaurant The Lion in Manhattan's Greenwich Village and White Street in Tribeca. In 2025, he launched Danny's restaurant.

== Personal life ==
In June 2012, Abrams had his first child, a boy, with girlfriend Florinka Pesenti, who was part of the winning team on The Amazing Race 3. They had a daughter in 2021.
