= Lists of American crime television episodes =

This is a list of lists of American crime television episodes.

== Crime ==
- List of 77 Sunset Strip episodes
- List of Angie Tribeca episodes
- List of Barnaby Jones episodes
- List of Batman (TV series) episodes
- List of Brooklyn Nine-Nine episodes
- List of Cannon episodes
- List of Cold Justice episodes
- List of Cops episodes (season 21–present)
- List of Cops episodes (seasons 1–20)
- List of Dragnet (1951 TV series) episodes
- List of Dragnet (1989 TV series) episodes
- List of Dragnet (2003 TV series) episodes
- List of Father Dowling Mysteries episodes
- List of From Dusk till Dawn episodes
- List of Harry's Law episodes
- List of Hart to Hart episodes
- List of Hawaiian Eye episodes
- List of In the Heat of the Night episodes
- List of It Takes a Thief (1968 TV series) episodes
- List of iZombie episodes
- List of Kung Fu: The Legend Continues episodes
- List of Mission: Impossible (1966 TV series) episodes
- List of Monk episodes
- List of Moonlighting episodes
- List of NCIS episodes
- List of NCIS: Hawaiʻi episodes
- List of NCIS: Los Angeles episodes
- List of NCIS: New Orleans episodes
- List of Reno 911! episodes
- List of Scarecrow and Mrs. King episodes
- List of Simon & Simon episodes
- List of Sledge Hammer! episodes
- List of Snapped episodes

== Crime drama ==
- List of 21 Jump Street episodes
- List of 24 episodes
- List of Adam-12 episodes
- List of Alfred Hitchcock Presents (1985 TV series) episodes
- List of American Crime episodes
- List of Animal Kingdom episodes
- List of Arrow episodes
- List of Banshee episodes
- List of Beauty and the Beast (1987 TV series) episodes
- List of Beauty & the Beast (2012 TV series) episodes
- List of Better Call Saul episodes
- List of The Blacklist episodes
- List of Blindspot episodes
- List of Blue Bloods episodes
- List of Boardwalk Empire episodes
- List of Bones episodes
- List of Bosch episodes
- List of Breaking Bad episodes
- List of Breakout Kings episodes
- List of The Bridge (2013 TV series) episodes
- List of Brotherhood episodes
- List of Burn Notice episodes
- List of Cagney & Lacey episodes
- List of Castle episodes
- List of Chicago P.D. episodes
- List of CHiPs episodes
- List of Close to Home (2005 TV series) episodes
- List of The Closer episodes
- List of Cold Case episodes
- List of Columbo episodes
- List of Copper episodes
- List of Criminal Minds episodes
- List of Crossing Jordan episodes
- List of CSI: Crime Scene Investigation episodes
- List of CSI: Miami episodes
- List of CSI: NY episodes
- List of Damages episodes
- List of Dexter episodes
- List of Diagnosis: Murder episodes
- List of Elementary episodes
- List of The Equalizer (1985 TV series) episodes
- List of Fargo episodes
- List of The Flash episodes
- List of The Following episodes
- List of The Fugitive episodes
- List of The Glades episodes
- List of Good Behavior episodes
- List of Gotham episodes
- List of Graceland episodes
- List of Grimm episodes
- List of Hawaii Five-0 (2010 TV series) episodes
- List of Hawaii Five-O (1968 TV series) episodes
- List of Hill Street Blues episodes
- List of Homicide: Life on the Street episodes
- List of Hunter episodes
- List of Ironside episodes
- List of Jake and the Fatman episodes
- List of Justified episodes
- List of The Killing episodes
- List of Kojak episodes
- List of Law & Order episodes
- List of Law & Order: Organized Crime episodes
- List of Law & Order: Criminal Intent episodes
- List of Law & Order: Special Victims Unit episodes (seasons 1–19)
- List of Law & Order: Special Victims Unit episodes (season 20–present)
- List of Lethal Weapon episodes
- List of Leverage episodes
- List of Lie to Me episodes
- List of Life episodes
- List of Longmire episodes
- List of Lucifer episodes
- List of Major Crimes episodes
- List of The Making of the Mob episodes
- List of Mannix episodes
- List of McCloud episodes
- List of McMillan & Wife episodes
- List of Medium episodes
- List of The Mentalist episodes
- List of Miami Vice episodes
- List of Millennium episodes
- List of The Mod Squad episodes
- List of Murder in the First episodes
- List of Murder, She Wrote episodes
- List of The Mysteries of Laura episodes
- List of Nash Bridges episodes
- List of NCIS: Origins episodes
- List of New York Undercover episodes
- List of Numbers episodes
- List of NYPD Blue episodes
- List of Pacific Blue episodes
- List of Perception episodes
- List of Perry Mason episodes
- List of Person of Interest episodes
- List of Police Story episodes
- List of Police Woman episodes
- List of Power episodes
- List of Prison Break episodes
- List of Profiler episodes
- List of Psych episodes
- List of Queen of the South episodes
- List of Quincy, M.E. episodes
- List of Ray Donovan episodes
- List of The Rockford Files episodes
- List of Rogue (TV series) episodes
- List of The Rookie episodes
- List of S.W.A.T. (1975 TV series) episodes
- List of S.W.A.T. (2017 TV series) episodes
- List of Saving Grace episodes
- List of Shades of Blue episodes
- List of The Shield episodes
- List of Silk Stalkings episodes
- List of The Sopranos episodes
- List of Southland episodes
- List of Spenser: For Hire episodes
- List of Starsky & Hutch episodes
- List of Stitchers episodes
- List of The Streets of San Francisco episodes
- List of T. J. Hooker episodes
- List of Third Watch episodes
- List of True Detective episodes
- List of Twin Peaks episodes
- List of Unforgettable episodes
- List of The Untouchables (1959 TV series) episodes
- List of The Untouchables (1993 TV series) episodes
- List of Vegas (1978 TV series) episodes
- List of Walker, Texas Ranger episodes
- List of White Collar episodes
- List of The Wire episodes
- List of Without a Trace episodes
