= List of Cops episodes (season 21–present) =

Cops (stylized as COPS) is an American documentary/reality legal series that follows police officers, constables, sheriff's deputies, federal agents and state troopers during patrols and other police activities including prostitution and narcotics stings. It is one of the longest-running television programs in the United States and, as of May 2011, the longest-running show on Fox, following the cancellation of America's Most Wanted after 23 years.

The show follows the activities of police officers by assigning television camera crews to accompany them as they perform their duties. The show's formula follows the cinéma vérité convention, with no narration or scripted dialog, depending entirely on the commentary of the officers and on the actions of the people with whom they come into contact.

In 2013, Fox canceled Cops after 25 seasons, following requests by the Color of Change organization to do so. However, the series was soon picked up by Spike TV, a cable channel now known as Paramount Network. In 2020, the program was once again canceled, this time after its 32nd season. Despite its cancellation, production of a 33rd season began in September 2020, with the intentions of an international broadcast. In 2021, it was announced that Fox Nation picked up the show. The 33rd season premiered on October 1, 2021. The 34th season premiered on September 30, 2022. The 35th season premiered on April 7, 2023. Season 36 premiered on April 5, 2024; On July 11, 2025, Cops would air a new episode on the Paramount Network again titled "Stick and Move;" this episode would then debut on Fox Nation on August 1, 2025. Season 37 premiered on March 7, 2025, with ifs first non-special episode airing on October 24, 2025.

== Series overview ==
Season	Episodes		Originally released		
Season	Episodes		First released	Last released	Network
1	15		March 11, 1989	June 17, 1989	Fox
2	31		September 23, 1989	May 5, 1990	Fox
3	42		September 15, 1990	August 31, 1991	Fox
4	45		August 10, 1991	December 12, 1992	Fox
5	46		August 15, 1992	September 4, 1993	Fox
6	46		August 7, 1993	December 17, 1994	Fox
7	41		May 14, 1994	November 10, 1995	Fox
8	43		February 25, 1995	July 13, 1996	Fox
9	36		August 31, 1996	July 26, 1997	Fox
10	36		September 6, 1997	August 1, 1998	Fox
11	36		September 12, 1998	September 18, 1999	Fox
12	36		September 11, 1999	July 29, 2000	Fox
13	40		May 20, 2000	July 7, 2001	Fox
14	36		September 1, 2001	September 21, 2002	Fox
15	36		May 4, 2002	November 1, 2003	Fox
16	41		April 26, 2003	October 2, 2004	Fox
17	36		May 15, 2004	August 6, 2005	Fox
18	36		September 10, 2005	July 22, 2006	Fox
19	36		September 9, 2006	July 28, 2007	Fox
20	38		September 8, 2007	August 2, 2008	Fox
21	36		September 7, 2008	July 25, 2009	Fox
22	36		September 12, 2009	July 31, 2010	Fox
23	22		September 11, 2010	June 18, 2011	Fox
24	22		September 10, 2011	April 7, 2012	Fox
25	16		December 15, 2012	May 4, 2013	Fox
26	22		September 14, 2013	March 8, 2014	Spike
27	33		July 12, 2014	May 9, 2015	Spike
28	33		June 20, 2015	April 30, 2016	Spike
29	33		June 4, 2016	April 22, 2017	Spike
30	33	22	June 17, 2017	November 13, 2017	Spike
30	33	11	January 22, 2018	May 21, 2018	Paramount Network
31	33		June 4, 2018	May 20, 2019	Paramount Network
32	33		June 3, 2019	May 11, 2020	Paramount Network
33	33		October 1, 2021	July 8, 2022	Fox Nation
34	17		September 30, 2022	March 31, 2023	Fox Nation
35	33		April 7, 2023	March 29, 2024	Fox Nation
36	36		April 5, 2024	July 25, 2025	Fox Nation
37	34		March 7, 2025	June 19, 2026	Fox Nation

== Episodes ==
=== Season 21 (2008–2009) ===
- The current Langley Productions logo was introduced.

This is the first season to feature the 2008-2020 title card.

No. overall	No. in season	Title	Original release date	US viewers (millions)
753	1	"Back to Broward Special Edition"	September 6, 2008	4.89
754	2	"What a Sap Special Edition"	September 6, 2008	5.89
755	3	"Stupid Behavior 3"	September 13, 2008	4.62
756	4	"Resisting Arrest 4"	September 20, 2008	4.56
757	5	"Black & Blue & White Special Edition"	September 27, 2008	4.68
758	6	"Coast to Coast 145"	October 4, 2008	4.63
759	7	"What! Who Me? Special Edition"	October 11, 2008	4.68
760	8	"Morons on Parade Special Edition"	November 1, 2008	4.54
761	9	"Anger Management Special Edition"	November 8, 2008	5.30
762	10	"Liar Liar 2 Special Edition"	November 15, 2008	5.67
763	11	"Evidence ... What Evidence? 2"	November 22, 2008	5.17
764	12	"Coast to Coast 146"	December 6, 2008	5.29
765	13	"Ho! Ho! Ho! 5 Special Edition"	December 13, 2008	5.05
766	14	"Coast to Coast 147"	January 17, 2009	5.27
767	15	"Coast to Coast 148"	January 24, 2009	5.61
768	16	"Coast to Coast 149"	January 31, 2009	5.93
769	17	"Coast to Coast 150"	February 6, 2009	4.01
770	18	"Upon Further Investigation Special Edition"	February 14, 2009	5.26
771	19	"Neighborhood Busts 1"	February 21, 2009	5.61
772	20	"In Denial 2 Special Edition"	February 28, 2009	4.91
773	21	"Liar Liar 3 Special Edition"	March 7, 2009	5.49
774	22	"On the Run Special Edition"	March 14, 2009	5.11
775	23	"750th Episode Milestone"	March 21, 2009	4.95
776	24	"Bad Girls! 12 Special Edition"	March 21, 2009	5.77
777	25	"Dazed and Confused 1"	March 28, 2009	5.16
778	26	"High Crimes 4 Special Edition"	March 28, 2009	5.79
779	27	"Coast to Coast 151"	April 11, 2009	4.91
780	28	"Police Pullovers 5 Special Edition"	April 25, 2009	1.70
781	29	"From Bad to Worse Special Edition"	April 25, 2009	3.92
782	30	"Odd Arrests 1"	May 16, 2009	3.25
783	31	"Coast to Coast 152"	May 16, 2009	4.26
784	32	"Coast to Coast 153"	May 30, 2009	3.92
785	33	"Coast to Coast 154"	June 6, 2009	4.05
786	34	"Coast to Coast 155"	July 11, 2009	3.56
787	35	"Coast to Coast 156"	July 18, 2009	3.82
788	36	"Coast to Coast 157"	July 25, 2009	4.59

=== Season 22 (2009–2010) ===
No. overall	No. in season	Title	Original release date	US viewers (millions)
789	1	"Odd Arrests 2"	September 12, 2009	3.95
790	2	"Liar Liar 4 Special Edition"	September 12, 2009	5.17
791	3	"Domestic Disturbances Special Edition"	September 19, 2009	4.41
792	4	"Dazed and Confused 2"	September 26, 2009	4.14
793	5	"Family Ties 2 Special Edition"	October 3, 2009	4.41
794	6	"Neighborhood Busts 2"	October 10, 2009	5.11
795	7	"In Denial 3 Special Edition"	October 24, 2009	3.93
796	8	"Dangerous Arrests"	November 7, 2009	4.84
797	9	"Strange Behavior 4"	November 14, 2009	5.07
798	10	"Slacker Crimes Special Edition"	November 21, 2009	4.87
799	11	"Coast to Coast 158"	November 28, 2009	4.89
800	12	"Coast to Coast 159"	December 5, 2009	5.35
801	13	"Ho! Ho! Ho! 6 Special Edition"	December 12, 2009	5.14
802	14	"Bad Girls! 13 Special Edition"	January 9, 2010	4.70
803	15	"Coast to Coast 160"	January 16, 2010	7.10
804	16	"Coast to Coast 161"	January 23, 2010	5.99
805	17	"Coast to Coast 162"	January 30, 2010	5.90
806	18	"Chases, Stings & Rescues"	February 13, 2010	4.76
807	19	"War on Drugs 4"	February 20, 2010	4.86
808	20	"Drugs & Driving"	February 27, 2010	5.42
809	21	"Coast to Coast 163"	March 6, 2010	5.64
810	22	"Coast to Coast 164"	March 13, 2010	6.21
811	23	"Coast to Coast 165"	March 20, 2010	4.57
812	24	"Coast to Coast 166"	March 27, 2010	4.81
813	25	"Street Patrol 1 Special Edition"	April 17, 2010	3.56
814	26	"Coast to Coast 167"	April 24, 2010	4.82
815	27	"Police Pullovers 6 Special Edition"	May 15, 2010	3.79
816	28	"Resisting Arrest 6"	May 15, 2010	4.81
817	29	"Coast to Coast 168"	June 5, 2010	3.82
818	30	"Coast to Coast 169"	June 12, 2010	3.78
819	31	"Coast to Coast 170"	June 19, 2010	3.81
820	32	"Coast to Coast 171"	July 3, 2010	2.96
821	33	"Morons on Parade 2 Special Edition"	July 10, 2010	3.61
822	34	"Coast to Coast 172"	July 17, 2010	3.75
823	35	"Coast to Coast 173"	July 24, 2010	2.13
824	36	"Coast to Coast 174"	July 31, 2010	3.97

=== Season 23 (2010–2011) ===
No. overall	No. in season	Title	Original release date
825	1	"800th Episode Milestone Special Edition"	September 11, 2010
826	2	"Customs and Border Patrol Special Edition"	September 18, 2010
827	3	"Roadside Crimes Special Edition"	September 25, 2010
828	4	"Couples in Crime Special Edition"	October 2, 2010
829	5	"Weapons Drawn #2 Special Edition"	October 9, 2010
830	6	"U.S. Marshals Special Edition"	November 6, 2010
831	7	"Probable Cause Special Edition"	November 13, 2010
832	8	"Morons on Parade 3 Special Edition"	November 20, 2010
833	9	"Coast to Coast 175"	December 4, 2010
834	10	"Ho! Ho! Ho! 7 Special Edition"	December 11, 2010
835	11	"Coast to Coast 176"	December 18, 2010
836	12	"Taken into Custody 1 Special Edition"	January 22, 2011
837	13	"Street Patrol 1"	January 29, 2011
838	14	"Street Patrol 2"	February 5, 2011
839	15	"Dazed and Confused 3"	February 19, 2011
840	16	"Morons on Parade 4 Special Edition"	February 26, 2011
841	17	"Coast to Coast 177"	March 5, 2011
842	18	"Odd Arrests 3"	March 12, 2011
843	19	"Home Assaults Special Edition"	March 19, 2011
844	20	"Coast to Coast 178"	April 23, 2011
845	21	"Coast to Coast 179"	June 11, 2011
846	22	"Coast to Coast 180"	June 18, 2011

=== Season 24 (2011–2012) ===
No. overall	No. in season	Title	Original release date
847	1	"Arrests With a Twist 1"	September 10, 2011
848	2	"Chases & Stings"	September 17, 2011
849	3	"Smooth Criminal"	September 24, 2011
850	4	"Evading Arrests"	November 5, 2011
851	5	"Street Arrests 1"	November 5, 2011
852	6	"Domestic Disputes"	November 12, 2011
853	7	"Liar Liar 5 Special Edition"	November 12, 2011
854	8	"Busted!"	November 19, 2011
855	9	"Morons on Parade 5 Special Edition"	November 19, 2011
856	10	"Coast to Coast 181"	November 26, 2011
857	11	"Ho! Ho! Ho! 8 Special Edition"	December 10, 2011
858	12	"Odd Arrests 4"	January 7, 2012
859	13	"Taken into Custody 2 Special Edition"	January 14, 2012
860	14	"Wild & Crazy Special Edition"	January 14, 2012
861	15	"Off-Campus Arrests"	January 21, 2012
862	16	"A Crash, an Arrest & a Baby"	January 21, 2012
863	17	"Caught in the Act 4 Special Edition"	February 4, 2012
864	18	"Chases, Guns and Cars"	February 4, 2012
865	19	"Street Arrests 2"	February 25, 2012
866	20	"Dazed and Confused 4"	February 25, 2012
867	21	"Arrests With a Twist 2"	March 31, 2012
868	22	"First Responders"	April 7, 2012

=== Season 25 (2012–2013) ===
- This is the last season on Fox before Spike picked up the show.

No. overall	No. in season	Title	Original release date
869	1	"Odd Arrests 5"	December 15, 2012
870	2	"Ho! Ho! Ho! 9 Special Edition"	December 22, 2012
871	3	"Street Arrests 3"	January 5, 2013
872	4	"Chases... and Cars 2"	January 19, 2013
873	5	"Liar Liar 6 Special Edition"	February 2, 2013
874	6	"Busted! 2"	February 2, 2013
875	7	"Wild & Crazy 2 Special Edition"	February 9, 2013
876	8	"Caught in a Lie"	February 9, 2013
877	9	"Street Patrol 3"	February 23, 2013
878	10	"Dazed and Confused 5"	March 2, 2013
879	11	"Strange Behavior 5"	March 9, 2013
880	12	"Morons on Parade 6 Special Edition"	March 16, 2013
881	13	"Taken into Custody 3 Special Edition"	March 23, 2013
882	14	"Coast to Coast 182"	March 30, 2013
883	15	"Fight Night (Busted! 3 Part 1)"	May 4, 2013
884	16	"Fight Night (Busted! 3 Part 2)"	May 4, 2013

=== Season 26 (2013–2014) ===
- The show moved to its final network Spike/Paramount Network starting with this season.

No. overall	No. in season	Title	Original release date
885	1	"Fight and Flight"	September 14, 2013
A suspect flees when police are called to the scene of a fight. A meth user refuses to cooperate with officers. A man gets busted for pot after his wife kicked over his motorcycle.
886	2	"Who Let the Dogs Out?"	September 21, 2013
A K-9 is summond when a burglary suspect climbs up a tree. A cyclist seeks shelter in a stranger's house. A biker with a suspended license is stopped by police.
887	3	"Dead Man Flushing"	September 28, 2013
A store transaction turns into a wrestling match. A woman calls the police on her boyfriend who tried to flush her husband's ashes down the toilet. A shirtless man with a bad attitude refuses to cooperate.
888	4	"Pistol Packin' Families"	October 5, 2013
A cyclist tries to outrun officers. A messy divorce leads to gun fight. An angry dog is caught in the middle of a domestic dispute.
889	5	"Grown Men Gone Wild"	October 12, 2013
An irate Wal-Mart shopper won't listen and winds up getting tazed. An incoherent ex-marine cannot explain why he decked out a man. A routine traffic stop with loads of dogs and an undressing maniac.
890	6	"Kill 'em With Kindness"	October 19, 2013
A gun-toting belligerent man doesn't take too kindly to some harsh parental criticism. A cyclist runs from the cops then pretends to be somebody else. Officers coax a hit-and run driver into coming clean.
891	7	"The Fighting Kind"	October 26, 2013
A squiggly meth user thinks he's strong. A drug carrying sprinter runs out of gas. A man becomes angry at having his socks removed during a routine traffic stop.
892	8	"Cell Phone Secrets"	November 2, 2013
A high speed chase ends in an accident. An emotional man gets more than he expected from cops. A fight breaks out when a woman seizes her man's cell phone.
893	9	"Guns, Hash, and Fire Hydrants"	November 9, 2013
A fleeing driver hits a fire hydrant. A domestic violence between a man and his girlfriend who called 911. Drugs, guns and contraband are discovered.
894	10	"Get Off My Roof!"	November 16, 2013
A man with a gun sitting on a rooftop is bitten by a K-9. A known drug dealer tries to dump his stash. An alleged drunk driver is stopped.
895	11	"This Man Stabbed Me"	November 23, 2013
A car thief leads police on a high speed chase. Officers search for a man who left a baby in a hot car. A guy tells officers he was stabbed.
896	12	"Blood and Scars, Bro!"	December 7, 2013
A man riding a scooter tries to outrun police. A call comes in for a wild drugged-out incoherent man lying in the bushes. Officers try to make peace between neighbors and an angry pit bull.
897	13	"My Jewelry's Fragile"	December 14, 2013
A cyclist tries to flee after being stopped by police. A traffic stop involving two brothers. A man hits his sister after she refused to mow the lawn.
898	14	"Fast Food Escape"	December 21, 2013
A drug suspect flees into a fast-food restaurant. A young man takes his grandmother's car for a spin. A pair of young lovebirds get caught with some mysterious white powder.
899	15	"Late Night Snacks"	January 18, 2014
Officers attempt to execute a PIT maneuver on a speeding vehicle. Officers try to flush out a suspect who barricaded himself inside a donut shop. Officers discover meth inside a pickup truck during a traffic stop.
900	16	"We Run the Show"	January 25, 2014
An armed robbery suspect leads officers on a chase through residential areas. A man riding a bicycle drops a bag of meth while fleeing from police. A domestic violence suspect claims self-defense.
901	17	"Doggie Paddle"	February 1, 2014
An unruly suspect with his unpredictable dogs is dealt with by officers. Two burglary suspects claim car trouble when found at the scene of a crime. A repentant meth addict is caught on the brink of his relapse.
902	18	"Wrong Place, Wrong Time"	February 8, 2014
A suspect flees from officers when they spot him in an area he's not supposed to be. A jaywalker is caught with suspicious items. A woman takes the heat for her boyfriend when drugs are discovered during a traffic stop.
903	19	"You Didn't Get Very Far"	February 15, 2014
A cyclist takes a nasty spill when he tries to flee. Officers chase a suspect in a stolen car who claims he was just fixing it for a friend. A man denies using drugs but officers find meth in his vehicle.
904	20	"Not My Text Messages"	February 22, 2014
A routine traffic stop turns into a drug bust. A suspicious man sitting in a parked car. Two frequent drug users in a known drug area are questioned.
905	21	"Hands Off the Junk"	March 1, 2014
Officers chase a group of suspects who bailed out of a stolen car. Officers set up a prostitution sting. A woman is busted for weed.
906	22	"Dealt a Bad Hand"	March 8, 2014
A vehicle flips over during a high speed chase. A man says a stranger tried to hit him with a lasso. A possible drunk driver has trouble staying in his own lane after a bad night of poker.

=== Season 27 (2014–2015) ===
No. overall	No. in season	Title	Original release date
907	1	"Mowhawked Cleaning Service"	July 12, 2014
In the Season 27 premiere, A cyclist gives officers a bloody fight. a scared caregiver attempts to evict an unwanted helper from her patient's house. A mysterious tinfoil lands an unlicensed driver in hot water.
908	2	"Batter Up"	July 19, 2014
When a car tow employee denies a woman her car back, she uses her body for batting practice. A man with a warrant explains his medicinal meth use. A couple tries to get creative by convincing officers they didn't shoplift.
909	3	"The Runaways"	July 26, 2014
A driverless vehicle goes headfirst into an apartment complex. A man can't even scamper enough to evade officers. Officers stumble upon a 7-year old boy who left home alone.
910	4	"Perfume Takedown"	August 2, 2014
A fleeing thief runs right into a patrolman. Armed robbery victims give statements during an investigation. Officers do their best to return tearful children to their mother.
911	5	"Put Your Clothes Back On"	August 9, 2014
Officers try to get a naked man to cooperate. Officers apprehend a 14-year old driving a stolen pickup truck. A routine traffic stop with loads of dope and even more lies.
912	6	"Tazed and Confused"	August 23, 2014
Officers are forced to take drastic measures when an unruly suspect won't stop fighting. Officers detain a man looking to flee with crack. Officers arrest a tearful driver with weed in his car.
913	7	"Crusin' the Neighborhood"	September 6, 2014
A traffic stop turns into an off-road race. A runaway suspect is seen hiding in a family member's closet. A domestic dispute over chips and dip.
914	8	"Step Away from the Cutlery"	September 13, 2014
An erratic driver is questioned. A knife-wielding man complains about his neighbors smoking marijuana. Officers come upon an emotional man holding a blade to his throat.
915	9	"Love Bites"	September 27, 2014
A transgender woman in a wheelchair fights back against an aggressive bully. A barely dressed couple in a biting match. A reckless driver is pulled over.
916	10	"Running in Traffic"	October 4, 2014
Officers chase a fleeing suspect through oncoming traffic. Surveillance video captures an assault suspect in the act. Officers track down a suspect in a stranger's apartment.
917	11	"Taser Proof"	October 11, 2014
Officers learn the hard way that even a taser can't take down a suspect. A couple getting undressed in a darkened pickup truck. Officers arrest a polite suspect.
918	12	"You'll Shoot Your Eye Out"	October 18, 2014
A suspect runs through a hotel fence. A knife fight between two brothers. Officers apprehend a man who fired his BB gun at a neighbor's child.
919	13	"I'll Raise My Voice Right Back!"	October 25, 2014
Officers conduct an undercover drug bust. Officers arrest a drunken man who won't stop talking. A domestic abuse victim admits to hitting her husband over a bit of booze.
920	14	"We Know Who You Are"	November 1, 2014
Officers are forced to taze a suicidal man. Officers chase a familiar face through a grass field. A knife-wielding suspect takes refuge in a condemned house.
921	15	"Lady Bit My Finger"	November 8, 2014
A partygoer mistakenly asks another guest's finger for dessert. Officers chase a domestic violence suspect through residential areas. Three men claim they had no idea how their vehicle was stolen.
922	16	"Familiar Faces"	November 15, 2014
Officers chase a stolen SUV through a residential neighborhood. A drunken man with a large kitchen knife refuses to cooperate. Two unusual suspects head back to jail.
923	17	"Facebook Fury"	November 22, 2014
A DUI suspect reminds officers of one famous dude. A naked man shocks a stranger. An 8 year old girl's tantrums shakes the whole apartment after her mom takes away her facebook.
924	18	"Without a Paddle"	December 6, 2014
Officers chase a suspect through a creek. A good samaritan intervenes in a domestic dispute. A young woman begs officers to arrest her.
925	19	"Strange Encounters"	December 13, 2014
A man's new roommate gets more than he bargained for. The consequence of punching a scooter is discovered. Officers stop a not-so sober but weird suspect who may not be from another planet.
926	20	"Sucker Punch"	December 20, 2014
A man winds up in jail after going out to get a haircut. A street fight between a boxer and his confused friend. Officers give a suspect every chance to admit to his obvious crime.
927	21	"On Thin Ice"	January 10, 2015
A defiant suspect gets bitten by a K-9. A man pays his ex an unwanted visit. A routine traffic stop becomes much more complicated.
928	22	"Turbo Charged"	January 17, 2015
A resistant suspect is given too many chances. A driver lets a friend borrow his car. A man lies to officers.
929	23	"Pass the Rock"	January 24, 2015
A driver leads officers on a bizarre but dangerous high-speed chase. Officers search for a man accused of shooting up the neighborhood. An officer deals with two unusual suspects.
930	24	"Not My Crack"	January 31, 2015
An uncooperative suspect obeys instructions from his more level-headed relative. Officers question two known drug users riding in a stolen car. A suspect's crack rock is uncovered during a traffic stop.
931	25	"Scary Monsters"	February 7, 2015
A suspect running from cops thinks he sees monsters everywhere. Two lovers go toe-to toe during a domestic dispute. Officers try to sort out an incident involving two motorists and drugs.
932	26	"Eye in the Sky"	February 14, 2015
A jaywalking suspect darts on a mad dash through the weeds. A police helicopter helps track down a suspect riding a stolen motorcycle. A domestic dispute leads officers to a slew of unexpected crimes.
933	27	"Drunk in Love"	February 21, 2015
Hitching a ride home with the wrong guy almost lands a young woman in jail. A known prostitute won't be going on a second date. When a domestic partner refuses to leave, officers try to intervene.
934	28	"Tell It to My Wife"	February 28, 2015
A man calls out to his wife as he's taken to jail. A thief tries to give back stolen items. A young woman goes from passed out to out of control.
935	29	"Crash Landing"	April 11, 2015
A man hiding in an attic comes crashing down from the ceiling. Officers question a man with a broken car and a broken heart. Neighbors call the police to report cussing.
936	30	"The One Dollar Store"	April 18, 2015
A local nuisance is caught bothering people again. Officers question an unusual suspect with money in his shoe. A domestic dispute with a barely coherent man who is barely dressed.
937	31	"Getting Funcky"	April 25, 2015
A suspect takes off on foot while being stopped for drinking while biking. A woman in her PJs claims not to know why she ended up in a stolen vehicle. Officers catch a couple smoking meth in front of a child.
938	32	"Hit and Run"	May 2, 2015
A man who refused to pay child support is stopped by police. A woman's retaliation puts her girlfriend in jeopardy. A routine traffic stop with a man who has a stash of marijuana.
939	33	"Be Careful What You Ask For"	May 9, 2015
A man begs officers to shoot him. An intoxicated woman is arrested for domestic assault. Officers deal with a dysfunctional family.

=== Season 28 (2015–2016) ===
No. overall	No. in season	Title	Original release date	U.S. viewers (millions)
940	1	"Cats and Dogs"	June 20, 2015	1.149
An armed trespasser uses his dog as a shield. A drunk woman on a rampage. A cat lady calls the cops on her nosy neighbors.
941	2	"Sittin' in the Dark"	June 27, 2015	1.266
A suspect hiding in plain sight. A man fires his weapon when he believes his dog is in danger. Officers encounter a distraught woman and her partner.
942	3	"The Blame Game"	July 11, 2015	1.088
A woman bursts into tears when her boyfriend is pulled over. A passenger is quick to cooperate during a sketchy traffic stop. A man explains to police how he got his wallet back.
943	4	"Brotherly Love"	July 18, 2015	1.246
A suspect leads officers on a wild pursuit. When a man threatens his brother with a knife, their mother calls the police. A young couple tells officers conflicting stories about their stolen vehicle.
944	5	"That's My Grill"	August 1, 2015	0.983
A handcuffed teen makes a break for it when deputies turn him over to paramedics. A man tries to keep his lips sealed during a traffic stop. An angry woman evicts her nephew and his pregnant girlfriend.
945	6	"Drive and Dash"	August 8, 2015	1.193
A man runs through a shower. A belligerent man violates a restraining order. A husband and wife give conflicting stories during a routine traffic stop.
946	7	"Thick as Thieves"	August 15, 2015	1.258
Officers chase a pair of car thieves. A friendship starts to crumble when police start asking questions. A man claims letting homeless people use his car for storage.
947	8	"Pinky Promise"	August 22, 2015	1.119
A sleepy motorist greets officers with a foul mood. Reports of a suspicious person leads to much much more. A young woman tries to promise her way out of a trip to jail.
948	9	"Dead End Dash"	September 12, 2015	1.172
A suspect leads deputies to a dead end. A family outing ends in a vehicle search and a trip to jail. A domestic violence between a father and his teenage son.
949	10	"Four Felonies and a Flat Tire"	September 19, 2015	1.267
A car thief reacts to being arrested on camera. Officers are forced to disable a man's car during a pursuit. A woman gives deputies a fake name.
950	11	"Pants Party"	September 26, 2015	1.115
A reckless driver bails out of a checkpoint. Officers deal with a peculiar group of suspicious people. Officers do a little digging to get to the bottom of things.
951	12	"Smooth Move"	October 3, 2015	1.062
A suspected copper thief plays dumb when officers catch up to him. A jittery cyclist's slippery maneuver. A young couple take their fight to the streets.
952	13	"Highway to Jail"	October 10, 2015	1.232
ATV suspects leads officers on a high speed chase. A routine traffic stop ends with a young couple at gunpoint. A motorist tries to give deputies his brother's name.
953	14	"Dishonest Dudes"	October 17, 2015	1.126
A young couple tries to give officers the slip during a storm. A motorist attempts to resist deputies. Officers encounter a suspicious sweaty man on a dark street.
954	15	"Fighting to Lose"	October 24, 2015	1.479
Officers spot a young couple in a port-a potty. A combative suspect refuses to cooperate with officers. A heated argument between two friends catches the officers attention.
955	16	"Mom Still Loves You"	November 7, 2015	1.262
A young man tries to tell officers what to do. A known lawbreaker attempts to elude police. Emotions run high when a mother tearfully confronts her handcuffed son.
956	17	"The Young and the Reckless"	November 14, 2015	1.367
A man with multiple warrants puts up a fight when being faced with a trip to jail. A desperate driver makes a last-minute attempt to hide his crime. A teenager is forced to join the workforce after he makes a costly error.
957	18	"Too Many Cooks"	November 21, 2015	1.501
A polite lawbreaker surprises deputies. A suspicious activity at a gas station. An argument over dinner results in a call to cops.
958	19	"Second Time Around"	December 5, 2015	1.170
Deputies are shocked when they recognize a repeat offender. A desperate man shows no love for his girlfriend when being confronted by cops. Officers bring in a K-9 to complete a vehicle search.
959	20	"Party in a Box"	December 12, 2015	1.489
Surveillance video footage catches one suspect in the act. Officers divide and conquer after a car chase. A suspicious character accuses the cops of being untrustworthy.
960	21	"Two in the Bush"	December 19, 2015	1.247
One offender tries to change the rules after deputies place her in handcuffs. An unlicensed driver speeds away from a checkpoint with devastating results. Officers do their best to learn the truth from two evasive suspects.
961	22	"Undeniably Fishy"	January 9, 2016	1.183
After a night out on the town, a man loses his friend and finds trouble. Officers stop a vehicle they believe was involved in a shooting. A suspicious young couple sitting in a parked car are questioned.
962	23	"Nothing to See Here"	January 16, 2016	1.053
A man with a felony warrant attempts to escape arrest. Things get weird when an agitated man wearing just a pair of briefs tries to reveal everything to the police. A young man makes poor choices that lead to a broken home.
963	24	"Bible Buddies"	January 23, 2016	1.519
A teen leads officers on a dangerous chase. A distress call helps officers identify a group of unsuspecting lawbreakers. An unsuccessful robbery suspect has a moment of honesty.
964	25	"Shaking Like a Paint Mixer"	January 30, 2016	1.359
A man jumps from a moving vehicle to escape the police. A car chase ends with a call to paramedics. An agitated man confuses threatening actions with heroism.
965	26	"Love Gone Bad"	February 6, 2016	1.216
A suspect with a concealed weapon. Suspicious activity at a parking lot. Domestic disturbance between two lovers.
966	27	"Crying Over Spilled Milk"	February 8, 2016	1.062
A suspected car thief ditches his ride. A man pulls a knife on a security guard at a bar. An argument over a bit of milk takes a violent turn.
967	28	"Front Door Felony"	February 13, 2016	1.301
Cops use city cameras to track down a suspected motorcycle thief. A K-9 unit searches a dark area. A concerned citizen steps in to thwart a pair of would-be mail thieves.
968	29	"What's in the Box"	February 20, 2016	1.307
A homeless man puts up a serious fight to maintain his freedom. A pair of suspicious characters in a parked car catches the attention of officers. A squabble between two lovers draws attention to an outstanding warrant.
969	30	"Trouble in Paradise"	April 9, 2016	1.111
A homeless man decides to test the police when he thinks there's no way out. Several good samaritans catch a man breaking into their neighbor's car. Officers try to resolve a domestic dispute between newlyweds.
970	31	"Carjacked Up"	April 16, 2016	1.152
An armed suspect with blood on his body. A suspect driving a stolen car bails when pulled over. Officers apprehend several suspects after seeing a pair of carjacked vehicles.
971	32	"No Helmet, No Ride"	April 23, 2016	1.137
A lack of safety equipment calls attention to a lawbreaker. Officers search for a man armed with a gun. Detained suspects have trouble trying to explain how they got to know each other.
972	33	"Sidewalk Licker"	April 30, 2016	1.293
Two very different lawbreakers get caught up in a prostitution sting. Officers deal with a cagey lady. An argument in a parking lot draws the attention of a vigilant officer.

=== Season 29 (2016–2017) ===
No. overall	No. in season	Title	Original release date	U.S. viewers (millions)
973	1	"From Sixty to Zero"	June 4, 2016	1.171
A speeding motorcyclist leads police on a high speed chase. A lawbreaker tries to explain everything to avoid being caught. A parolee blames his mother about his troubled past.
974	2	"First Time Caller"	June 11, 2016	1.189
A suspect risks his life while trying to escape arrest. A father refuses to cover for his violent son. A woman calls police to report some trespassing ghosts.
975	3	"Kicking and Screaming"	June 18, 2016	0.934
A belligerent man lashes out at his girlfriend's family. Suspicious activity at a motel parking lot. A repeat sex offender is caught at a gas station.
976	4	"Mixed Emotions"	June 25, 2016	1.241
A father-son duo get caught in a traffic stop gone awry. Officers are called to a family fight. Deputies follow a disoriented driver to a gas station.
977	5	"Better Safe Than Sorry"	July 9, 2016	1.092
An armed suspect refuses to comply orders and is tazed by officers. A convicted felon tries everything to avoid a trip to jail. A vehicle rolls into oncoming traffic.
978	6	"Funny Money"	July 16, 2016	1.042
An officer pursues a bail jumper. A deputy pulls over a lawbreaker. Deputies struggle to remove a violent offender from the scene of a disturbance.
979	7	"Pants Down, Hit the Ground"	July 23, 2016	1.253
A repeat offender quickly reveals himself to police. A man learns a hard lesson about wearing his seatbelt. Officers conduct a traffic stop and find a sad man with a strange story.
980	8	"British Invasion"	July 30, 2016	1.162
A desperate trespasser tries to evade officers. A scared man tries to get the attention of officers but in the wrong way. Officers show that honesty can go a long way.
981	9	"One, Two, Tree"	August 6, 2016	1.045
A high speed chase ends badly when a suspect takes a wrong turn. Officers deal with a jilted lover while responding to a disturbance call. A nervous man tries to hide his crime.
982	10	"Wake Up Call"	August 13, 2016	1.228
A suspicious man takes his chances with a taser. A lawbreaker tries to convince officers he didn't steal a car. Deputies pull over a suspicious vehicle.
983	11	"Just Hanging Out"	August 20, 2016	1.049
A suspicious man on a bicycle decides to make a run for it. Officers respond to a burglary in progress call. A frightened lawbreaker can't explain her activity.
984	12	"Bail Me Out, Boss"	August 27, 2016	1.312
Things go from bad to worse for one motorist when his passenger begins to talk. A distressed woman leads the cops to her abusive fiancé. A couple of officers don’t know what to think when they pull over an overly friendly man.
985	13	"Thanks for Nothing, Mom"	September 24, 2016	1.140
A teenager makes an adult decision and calls the cops on her neighbor. When a young mother chooses violence, grandma phones the police. Deputies question a suspicious group of people behind a quiet truck stop.
986	14	"Clueless"	October 1, 2016	1.265
A frightened, young lawbreaker does everything she can to escape jail. Grandpa comes to the rescue when Mom fails to do the right thing. A simple traffic stop leads one deputy to suspect an elderly couple of criminal activity.
987	15	"Organized Crime"	October 8, 2016	1.295
Emotions run high during a dispute involving alcohol and a beloved pet. A talkative motorist struggles to keep his story straight with the cops. Deputies investigate a domestic incident and find the aggressor in an awkward spot.
988	16	"Out of Sight, Out of Mind"	October 15, 2016	1.043
A lawbreaker tries to blame his actions on familial obligations. A father is left with no choice but to call the cops on his son. Officers discover some interesting items when they search a family man’s car.
989	17	"Two Doors Down"	October 22, 2016	1.134
990	18	"One Headlight"	October 29, 2016	0.950
991	19	"Between a Bush and a Hard Place"	November 5, 2016	1.033
992	20	"Manic Monday"	November 12, 2016	1.289
993	21	"Gun in the Front, Rifle in the Back"	November 19, 2016	1.383
994	22	"Heat of the Moment"	December 3, 2016	1.153
995	23	"Cookies and Contraband"	December 10, 2016	1.254
996	24	"Odd Man Out"	December 17, 2016	1.358
997	25	"Bikini Brawl"	January 21, 2017	1.555
998	26	"A Man Without a Plan"	January 21, 2017	1.622
999	27	"The Truth is Key"	January 28, 2017	1.118
1,000	28	"Mother Knows Best"	February 4, 2017	1.222
1,001	29	"The Naked Truth"	February 11, 2017	1.214
1,002	30	"Rock Star"	February 18, 2017	1.048
1,003	31	"Window of Opportunity"	February 18, 2017	1.174
1,004	32	"Mommy's Tears"	April 15, 2017	0.939
1,005	33	"Running Scared"	April 22, 2017	0.905

=== Season 30 (2017–2018) ===
No. overall	No. in season	Title	Original release date	U.S. viewers (millions)
1,006	1	"On the Dean's List"	June 17, 2017	0.778
1,007	2	"Dog Treats and Delinquents"	June 24, 2017	0.664
1,008	3	"Surprise Guest"	June 24, 2017	0.757
1,009	4	"On The Fence"	July 8, 2017	0.790
1,010	5	"Do Not Pass Go"	July 15, 2017	0.672
1,011	6	"Pants On Fire"	July 22, 2017	0.867
1,012	7	"Dirty Laundry"	July 29, 2017	0.713
1,013	8	"Jumping the Gun"	August 5, 2017	0.764
1,014	9	"Wrong Way Home"	August 12, 2017	0.880
1,015	10	"Bad Business"	August 21, 2017	0.961
1,016	11	"I Used to Use My Brain"	August 21, 2017	0.934
1,000	Special	"Beyond the Bust"	August 21, 2017	0.676
1,017	12	"Crawl Space Catnap"	August 28, 2017	0.807
1,018	13	"Set in His Ways"	September 11, 2017	0.634
1,019	14	"Wedding Car Crasher"	September 18, 2017	0.800
1,020	15	"Fake Friends"	September 23, 2017	0.583
1,021	16	"Nowhere to Hide"	October 2, 2017	0.672
1,022	17	"Loaded Up and Truckin'"	October 9, 2017	0.744
1,023	18	"It's Nothing Personal"	October 16, 2017	0.613
1,024	19	"Run and Gun"	October 23, 2017	0.708
1,025	20	"Face the Music"	October 30, 2017	0.702
1,026	21	"Scaredy Cat"	November 6, 2017	0.720
1,027	22	"Fake Cash and Whiplash"	November 13, 2017	0.678
1,028	23	"Just Desserts"	January 22, 2018	0.515
1,029	24	"Late Night Shopper"	January 29, 2018	0.516
1,030	25	"Hug It Out"	February 5, 2018	0.535
1,031	26	"The Running Man"	February 12, 2018	0.554
1,032	27	"Whose Gun Is It Anyway"	February 19, 2018	0.464
1,033	28	"Bad Eggs"	April 16, 2018	0.304
1,034	29	"Sleight of Hand"	April 23, 2018	0.330
1,035	30	"Change of Heart"	April 30, 2018	0.340
1,036	31	"Kiss and Make Up"	May 7, 2018	0.254
1,037	32	"Cheek to Cheek"	May 14, 2018	0.265
1,038	33	"Up in Smoke"	May 21, 2018	0.264

=== Season 31 (2018–2019) ===
No. overall	No. in season	Title	Original release date	U.S. viewers (millions)
1,039	1	"Feel the Heat"	June 4, 2018	0.466
1,040	2	"Going Nowhere Fast"	June 11, 2018	0.462
1,041	3	"Keys To Success"	June 18, 2018	0.517
1,042	4	"In Denial"	June 18, 2018	0.552
1,043	5	"Bathroom Blitz"	June 18, 2018	0.550
1,044	6	"The Facts of Life"	June 18, 2018	0.563
1,045	7	"Three's Company"	June 25, 2018	0.536
1,046	8	"Out the Window"	July 2, 2018	0.493
1,047	9	"Burning Rubber"	July 9, 2018	0.448
1,048	10	"Breaking the Cycle"	July 16, 2018	0.432
1,049	11	"Get a Bus Pass"	July 23, 2018	0.398
1,050	12	"Slow and Low"	January 7, 2019	0.449
1,051	13	"Wheeling and Stealing"	January 7, 2019	0.435
1,052	14	"Perfect Strangers"	January 14, 2019	0.569
1,053	15	"In Plain Sight"	January 14, 2019	0.514
1,054	16	"Cooking Up Trouble"	January 28, 2019	0.436
1,055	17	"Coming Clean"	January 28, 2019	0.449
1,056	18	"Manicure for a Broken Heart"	February 4, 2019	0.550
1,057	19	"What's My Age Again?"	February 11, 2019	0.506
1,058	20	"Not in My Back Yard"	February 25, 2019	0.561
1,059	21	"Formula for Disaster"	March 4, 2019	0.643
1,060	22	"Baby Driver"	March 11, 2019	0.520
1,061	23	"Little White Lies"	March 18, 2019	0.356
1,062	24	"Under My Thumb"	March 18, 2019	0.376
1,063	25	"Carry a Big Stick"	March 25, 2019	0.478
1,064	26	"Sugar and Spice"	April 1, 2019	0.655
1,065	27	"A Woman Corned"	April 8, 2019	0.502
1,066	28	"Glazed and Confused"	April 15, 2019	0.482
1,067	29	"The Telltale Voicemail"	April 22, 2019	0.522
1,068	30	"Triple Threat"	April 29, 2019	0.466
1,069	31	"Lost and Found"	May 6, 2019	0.530
1,070	32	"All in the Family"	May 13, 2019	0.540
1,071	33	"Spinning Out"	May 20, 2019	0.480

=== Season 32 (2019–2020) ===
No. overall	No. in season	Title	Original release date	U.S. viewers (millions)
1,072	1	"Tracks of My Tears"	June 3, 2019	0.526
1,073	2	"Ounce of Confidence"	June 10, 2019	0.568
1,074	3	"Father Figure"	June 17, 2019	0.473
1,075	4	"Anyway You Slice It"	June 24, 2019	0.527
1,076	5	"Don't Fence Me In"	July 1, 2019	0.494
1,077	6	"Truck Amok"	July 8, 2019	0.543
1,078	7	"Mommy Loves You"	July 15, 2019	0.496
1,079	8	"Red in the Face"	July 22, 2019	0.486
1,080	9	"Out of Breath"	July 29, 2019	0.597
1,081	10	"Front Seat Fumble"	August 5, 2019	0.539
1,082	11	"Salt and Dash"	August 12, 2019	0.561
1,083	12	"Parental Guidance"	August 19, 2019	0.462
1,084	13	"Brush with Trouble"	September 9, 2019	0.366
1,085	14	"Instant Regret"	September 16, 2019	0.384
1,086	15	"I Told You So"	September 23, 2019	0.379
1,087	16	"Welcome Home"	September 30, 2019	0.354
1,088	17	"Cracking the Code"	October 7, 2019	0.339
1,089	18	"Barely There"	January 6, 2020	0.407
1,090	19	"Thicker Than Water"	January 13, 2020	0.307
1,091	20	"Hammer to Fall"	January 27, 2020	0.375
1,092	21	"If The Shoe Fits"	February 3, 2020	0.467
1,093	22	"Too Little Too Late"	February 10, 2020	0.433
1,094	23	"Not Up for Debate"	February 24, 2020	0.428
1,095	24	"Breathing Fire"	March 2, 2020	0.351
1,096	25	"Points for Neatness"	March 9, 2020	0.399
1,097	26	"Slow and Unsteady"	March 16, 2020	0.492
1,098	27	"You Got It Twisted"	March 23, 2020	0.532
1,099	29	"New Car Smell"	April 6, 2020	0.637
1,100	30	"Counterfeit Cruising"	April 13, 2020	0.450
1,101	31	"Taking the Low Road"	April 27, 2020	0.514
1,102	32	"Dog Days Are Over"	May 4, 2020	0.415
1,103	33	"Love and Marriage"	May 11, 2020	0.468

=== Season 33 (2020–2022) ===
This is the final season to air on the Paramount Network, the first 3 episodes of the season originally aired on the network respectfully while the 30 remaining episodes aired internationally due to the cancellation of the series in the U.S after the police murder of George Floyd, the remaining 30 episodes would finally air in the U.S on October 1, 2021 on its new network (a streaming service) Fox Nation, the sister streaming service of the show's original network, Fox.

No. overall	No. in season	Title	Original release date
1,104	1	"Stolen Cars and Firearms"	June 8, 2020
1,105	2	"Take It to the Bank"	June 15, 2020
1,106	3	"Tears and Fears"	June 22, 2020
1,107	4	"Third Wheeling"	October 1, 2021
1,108	5	"We'll Do It Live"	October 1, 2021
1,109	6	"Bike in the Bushes"	October 8, 2021
1,110	7	"Heart of Glass"	October 15, 2021
1,111	8	"Avoiding the Truth"	October 22, 2021
1,112	9	"Can't Tell You How to Live"	October 29, 2021
1,113	10	"Act Your Age"	November 5, 2021
1,114	11	"Betrayal and Baby Formula"	November 12, 2021
1,115	12	"Running on Empty"	November 19, 2021
1,116	13	"See You Later, Alligator"	November 26, 2021
1,117	14	"Pedal to the Metal"	December 3, 2021
1,118	15	"Nine Lives"	March 4, 2022
1,119	16	"What's Your Sign"	March 11, 2022
1,120	17	"Over the Hill"	March 18, 2022
1,121	18	"Hefty Amounts"	March 25, 2022
1,122	19	"Anger Management"	April 1, 2022
1,123	20	"Totaled Car Karma"	April 8, 2022
1,124	21	"Say It, Don’t Spray It"	April 15, 2022
1,125	22	"Eat My Dust"	April 22, 2022
1,126	23	"In Hot Water"	April 29, 2022
1,127	24	"Mr. Clean Getaway"	May 6, 2022
1,128	25	"Get to the Point"	May 13, 2022
1,129	26	"Very Superstitious"	May 20, 2022
1,130	27	"Take a Ride with Me"	May 27, 2022
1,131	28	"Funny Way of Learning"	June 3, 2022
1,132	29	"Scared Shirtless"	June 10, 2022
1,133	30	"Cowboy Take Me Away"	June 17, 2022
1,134	31	"Acting Kinda Shady"	June 24, 2022
1,135	32	"Start Your Engines"	July 1, 2022
1,136	33	"Fight or Flight"	July 8, 2022

=== Season 34 (2022–2023) ===
No. overall	No. in season	Title	Original release date
1,137	1	"Who Can It Be Now?"	September 30, 2022
1,138	2	"Dipping and Driving"	September 30, 2022
1,139	3	"Baby, I Have to Go to Jail"	September 30, 2022
1,140	4	"Share the Road"	October 7, 2022
1,141	5	"Double Jeopardy"	October 14, 2022
1,142	6	"Gloves Off"	October 21, 2022
1,143	7	"A Family Affair"	October 28, 2022
1,144	8	"Fury Road"	November 4, 2022
1,145	9	"Fixin' to Stop"	November 11, 2022
1,146	10	"Intruder Alert"	November 18, 2022
1,147	11	"Pass the Buck"	November 25, 2022
1,148	12	"Baby on the Way"	December 2, 2022
1,149	13	"Carside Confessions"	March 3, 2023
1,150	14	"Out-of-Towner"	March 10, 2023
1,151	15	"PIT Stop"	March 17, 2023
1,152	16	"No Good, Very Bad Day"	March 24, 2023
1,153	17	"Palms are Sweaty"	March 31, 2023

=== Season 35 (2023-2024) ===
No. overall	No. in season	Title	Original release date
1,154	1	"Gate Crusher Pursuit"	April 7, 2023
1,155	2	"Stolen Cycle Slingshot"	April 14, 2023
1,156	3	"Senior Stroll"	April 21, 2023
1,157	4	"Diamond Thief"	April 28, 2023
1,158	5	"License to Chill"	May 5, 2023
1,159	6	"Panic Room"	May 12, 2023
1,160	7	"Saw 30"	May 19, 2023
1,161	8	"Missing Pistol Pursuit"	May 26, 2023
1,162	9	"Puppy Luck"	June 2, 2023
1,163	10	"Hauling a Heater"	June 9, 2023
1,164	11	"2 Flats Don't Make A Right"	June 16, 2023
1,165	12	"Lost Love Machine"	June 23, 2023
1,166	13	"Red Flag"	June 30, 2023
1,167	14	"Burner Boy"	July 7, 2023
1,168	15	"No Luck Nephew"	July 14, 2023
1,169	16	"She Methed Up"	July 21, 2023
1,170	17	"Fire Hot Deputy"	October 6, 2023
1,171	18	"Hide and Cry"	October 6, 2023
1,172	19	"Cut Throat"	October 13, 2023
1,173	20	"Bus Stop Bandits"	October 20, 2023
1,174	21	"Traveling Taker"	October 27, 2023
1,175	22	"Papa Don't Stop"	November 3, 2023
1,176	23	"Not Meant for the Streets"	November 10, 2023
1,177	24	"5 Finger Discount Moped"	November 17, 2023
1,178	25	"Dangerously in Love"	November 24, 2023
1,179	26	"Worst Car Ever"	February 16, 2024
1,180	27	"Love Extinguished"	February 16, 2024
1,181	28	"Bad News Barricade"	February 23, 2024
1,182	29	"Challenge Accepted"	March 1, 2024
1,183	30	"Hung Up"	March 8, 2024
1,184	31	"Fast & Pho-Urious"	March 15, 2024
1,185	32	"I'm a Mermaid"	March 22, 2024
1,186	33	"Flip Flopped"	March 29, 2024

=== Season 36 (2024-2025) ===
No. overall	No. in season	Title	Original release date
1,187	1	"Spring Break Mistakes"	April 5, 2024
1,188	2	"Spring Break In"	April 5, 2024
1,189	3	"Spring Break Heartache"	April 12, 2024
1,190	4	"Spring Break Dance Party"	April 12, 2024
1,191	5	"Spring Break Wipeout"	April 19, 2024
1,192	34	"Tased and Confused"	June 21, 2024
1,193	35	"Hot Pursuit"	June 21, 2024
1,194	36	"Hot Pursuit 2"	June 21, 2024
1,195	6	"Anger Unmanaged"	September 27, 2024
1,196	7	"Reckless Intentions"	September 27, 2024
1,197	8	"Walk it Off"	October 4, 2024
1,198	9	"Fight, Flight or Chill"	October 11, 2024
1,199	10	"Flying Blind"	October 18, 2024
1,200	11	"Impulsive Decisions"	October 25, 2024
1,201	12	"Identity Crisis"	November 1, 2024
1,202	13	"Stolen Cars and Movie Stars"	November 8, 2024
1,203	14	"Light Confusion"	November 15, 2024
1,204	15	"Catch Me If You Can"	November 22, 2024
1,205	16	"Wild Ride"	November 29, 2024
1,206	17	"Familiar Faces"	December 6, 2024
1,207	18	"Slim Not So Fast"	February 28, 2025
1,208	19	"One For The Road"	March 28, 2025
1,209	20	"Running Out of Steam"	April 4, 2025
1,210	21	"Bagged Lady"	April 11, 2025
1,211	22	"Playtime is Over"	April 18, 2025
1,212	23	"Trippin' Taser"	April 25, 2025
1,213	24	"Missed Connections"	May 2, 2025
1,214	25	"Final Answer"	May 9, 2025
1,215	26	"Out of Air"	May 16, 2025
1,216	27	"Live Wire"	May 23, 2025
1,217	28	"Cuff Enough to Run"	May 30, 2025
1,218	29	"Clothes Call"	June 6, 2025
1,219	30	"Desert Dustup"	June 13, 2025
1,220	31	"Packin' Heat"	June 20, 2025
1,221	32	"Zoomin' and Schroomin'"	June 27, 2025
1,222	33	"Stick and Move (Originally aired on Paramount Network)"	July 11, 2025
1,223	34	"Stuck on You"	July 11, 2025
1,224	35	"Photo Finish"	July 18, 2025
1,225	36	"Up, Up and Away"	July 25, 2025

=== Season 37 (2025-2026) ===
No. overall	No. in season	Title	Original release date
1,226	1	"Spring Break: Hole Lotta Problems"	March 7, 2025
1,227	2	"Spring Break: Bridal Party Fallout"	March 7, 2025
1,228	3	"Spring Break: Bombed at the Beach"	March 14, 2025
1,229	4	"Spring Break: Mixed Emotions"	March 14, 2025
1,230	5	"Spring Break: Evicted From Paradise"	March 21, 2025
1,231	6	"Las Vegas: Over the Limit"	September 26, 2025
1,232	7	"Las Vegas: Dipped and Flipped"	September 26, 2025
1,233	8	"Las Vegas: Fake it til you make it"	October 3, 2025
1,234	9	"Las Vegas: Bus-Ted!"	October 10, 2025
1,235	10	"Las Vegas: Bossy and Glossy!"	October 17, 2025
1,236	11	"Mount Up, Takedown"	October 24, 2025
1,237	12	"Hit the Gas"	October 31, 2025
1,238	13	"Key Takeaways"	November 7, 2025
1,239	14	"Misspent Youth"	November 14, 2025
1,240	15	"No Bull Profession"	November 21, 2025
1,241	16	"Fueling Around"	November 28, 2025
1,242	17	"Flee Finder"	December 5, 2025
1,243	18	"Bawl Out"	February 27, 2026
1,244	19	"Up Sticks Creek"	March 6, 2026
1,245	20	"Picture Perfect"	March 13, 2026
1,246	21	"Puppy Protectors"	March 20, 2026
1,247	22	"Double Tapped"	March 27, 2026
1,248	23	"Air 1"	April 3, 2026
1,249	24	"Hide Attack"	April 10, 2026
1,250	25	"Kicks & Quibbles"	April 17, 2026
1,251	26	"Ram-Ble On"	April 24, 2026
1,252	27	"Mace to the Face"	May 1, 2026
1,253	28	"USB Honest"	May 8, 2026
1,254	29	"Chilly With A Chance Of Handcuffs"	May 15, 2026
1,255	30	"Shoulda Been Delivery"	May 22, 2026
1,256	31	"Flingin' Heaters"	May 29, 2026
1,257	32	"Taru Above, 75 Below"	June 5, 2026
1,258	33	"Seven Lives Saved"	June 12, 2026
1,259	34	"End of the Road"	June 19, 2026

=== Season 38 (2026-present) ===
No. overall	No. in season	Title	Original release date
1,260	1	"Resisting Arrest: Tough to Cuff"	June 26, 2026
1,261	2	"Tased and Confused: Shocking Behavior"	July 3, 2026
1,262	3	"Florida Man: Florida Man Strikes Again"	August 7, 2026
1,263	4	"Florida Man: Will Florida Man Ever Learn?"	August 7, 2026
1,264	5	"Florida Man: Florida Man Is On The Run"	August 7, 2026
1,265	6	"Florida Man: Florida Man: Florida Man Strikes Again"	August 11, 2026
1,266	7	"Florida Man: Florida Man Fights Back"	August 13, 2026
1,267	8	"Florida Man: Florida Man Can't Win"	August 20, 2026
1,267	8	"Florida Man: Florida Man Can't Win"	August 21, 2026
1,268	9	"Lethal Intentions"	August 28, 2026
1,269	10	"Smash and Go"	September 4, 2026
1,270	11	"S-Lied Into Jail"	September 11, 2026
1,271	11	"The Truth Escapes Me"	September 18, 2026
1,272	12	"Boosted & Busted"	September 25, 2026
1,273	13	"Kansas Highway Patrol: Pit-Y"	October 2, 2026
1,274	14	"Kansas Highway Patrol: Wheat Spins"	October 9, 2026
1,275	15	"Housemating Season"	October 16, 2026
1,276	16	"Breakfast Gram"	October 23, 2026
1,277	17	"Housemating Season"	October 30, 2026
1,278	18	"Meth for the Memories"	November 6, 2026
1,279	19	"Crumbs & Punishment"	November 13, 2026
