= List of From Dusk till Dawn episodes =

Episodes of American action horror television series

From Dusk till Dawn: The Series is an American action horror television series developed by Robert Rodriguez, using characters and story elements from the 1996 film of the same name written by Quentin Tarantino and Robert Kurtzman, which Rodriguez directed. The series premiered on Rodriguez's El Rey Network on March 11, 2014. Outside the United States and Latin America, the series is marketed as a Netflix original.

D.J. Cotrona stars as Seth Gecko, a hardened bank robber who has just been broken out of prison by his mentally unstable brother Richie (Zane Holtz), who has recently begun having visions of a mysterious woman who urges him to kill and invites him to find her. Meanwhile, after the death of his wife, former pastor Jacob Fuller (Robert Patrick) is taking an RV vacation into Mexico with his daughter Kate (Madison Davenport) and adopted son Scott (Brandon Soo Hoo). The lives of the Geckos and the Fullers become entwined as the brothers attempt to outrun the authorities and cross the Texas border into Mexico, where they will be sheltered by Cartel boss Don Carlos (Wilmer Valderrama). They are pursued by Texas Ranger Freddie Gonzalez (Jesse Garcia), who is out to avenge the death of his partner and mentor Earl McGraw (Don Johnson), whom the Geckos killed in a botched hostage situation. As of November 1, 2016, 30 episodes of From Dusk till Dawn have aired, concluding the third season.

== Series overview ==
Season	Episodes	Originally released	
Season	Episodes	First released	Last released
1	10	March 11, 2014	May 20, 2014
2	10	August 25, 2015	October 27, 2015
3	10	September 6, 2016	November 1, 2016

== Episodes ==
=== Season 1 (2014) ===
No. overall	No. in season	Title	Directed by	Written by	Original release date
1	1	"Pilot"	Robert Rodriguez	Robert Rodriguez	March 11, 2014
Somewhere in a jungle, a terrified woman is being chased by some tribesmen. She is caught and thrown into a pit of snakes that repeatedly bite her, until a giant python slithers into her mouth. Elsewhere, Richie Gecko breaks his brother Seth out of jail and the two set off on a crime spree. They rob a bank, killing four Texas Rangers and two police officers in the process, and stop at Benny's World of Liquor. Rangers Earl McGraw and Freddie Gonzalez arrive and a bloody standoff ensues. Richie has visions of demons and a mysterious woman, who appears to be the woman from the jungle, beckoning him from beyond, and Seth learns from the drug-lord Carlos that the Geckos must reach the Mexican border on their own.
2	2	"Blood Runs Thick"	Robert Rodriguez	Diego Gutierrez	March 18, 2014
Following their escape from the liquor store, the Geckos discuss recent events, including taking a teller hostage from the Abilene bank robbery. Richie's visions continue, causing Seth to think he is unstable. Although taken off the case, Ranger Gonzalez continues pursuing the Geckos, thinking one of them has killed drug cartel members. Meanwhile, six months after a car accident claimed his wife's life, Jacob Fuller takes his family on a vacation. His daughter Kate believes it to be something more. She remains in contact with her boyfriend, Kyle, who ends up being killed by Carlos, now seen as a vampire. As Kyle, Carlos reveals Jacob to be a minister who has lost his way.
3	3	"Mistress"	Eduardo Sánchez	Carlos Coto	March 25, 2014
The Geckos and their hostage stop at the Dew Drop Inn. Seth goes to get some food at Big Kahuna Burger and meets his wife to tell her that plans have changed. Even though she has helped them in the past, she should cross the border alone. Back in the motel room, Richie's seductive visions cause him to kill the bank teller. Meanwhile, the Fullers' RV breaks down near a bar where Gonzalez meets Professor Tanner, who explains the Mesoamerican symbols he has found. Tanner speaks of a "blood cult" and Carlos is a part of it, while Richie is trying to understand.
4	4	"Let's Get Ramblin'"	Robert Rodriguez	Marcel Rodriguez	April 1, 2014
The Geckos', the Fullers' and Gonzalez's paths merge at the Dew Drop Inn. Seth decides that the Fullers and their RV are the Geckos' ride across the border. Alone with Kate, Richie can sense something about her father is bothering her. Although curious, she is uneasy with this, as she has learned her father and mother might have argued in the car just before the fatal accident. Gonzalez, in possession of Richie's symbolic knife, begins to have visions of a man killed during his first Ranger bust with Earl. After a shootout with the police and Gonzalez, the Geckos and Fullers escape in the RV.
5	5	"Self-Contained"	Joe Menendez	Matt Morgan & Ian Sobel	April 8, 2014
The RV reaches the Mexico border, but must wait its turn in line to pass through border patrol. Richie fears the Fullers, as he believes Jacob is a demon. Jacob finally explains to his children about the car accident that killed their mother and caused him to lose faith in God. Meanwhile, Gonzalez escapes detention to arrive at the border, only to be held by Carlos, who has taken the form of the chief border agent and allows the RV to enter Mexico. The RV arrives at the Titty Twister bar.
6	6	"Place of Dead Roads"	Dwight Little	Alvaro Rodriguez	April 15, 2014
Gonzalez crosses into Mexico and is captured by Carlos's cartel. Carlos wants him tortured and killed, after hearing he has insight about the blood cult. At the Titty Twister, Seth believes they made a mistake coming there, while Richie believes otherwise. Outside, a man named Narciso saves Seth from a biker gang attack led by the bar's bouncer. Gonzalez escapes the cartel and arrives at the bar, just in time for Carlos to introduce Santanico Pandemonium's show. Richie recognizes her as the woman in his visions that led him there.
7	7	"Pandemonium"	Robert Rodriguez	Diego Gutierrez	April 29, 2014
Santanico performs a sultry dance for the audience before climbing onto the Geckos' and Fullers' table. Gonzalez uses her dance as a distraction to pin Richie's hand to the table with a knife. This causes Santanico and others to transform into serpentine vampires. They attack most everyone in the bar, as Carlos and the blood cult members briefly watch then move to a back room. The Geckos and Fullers survive the attack, but know there will be more when they find the bar sealed shut. Professor Tanner, known there as "Sex Machine", informs them of the mythology of the bar/temple. Meanwhile, in the back room, Carlos and Santanico dispose of the nine cult members who call them "slaves". Santanico returns to the bar for Richie and another attack begins.
8	8	"La Conquista"	Fede Álvarez	Marcel Rodriguez	May 6, 2014
As Santanico turns Richie to her cause, Freddie confronts Carlos about his destiny and the temple's mysterious past. Seth, the Fullers and Sex Machine battle their way deeper into the temple, where they meet an unexpected ally. Scott helps Carlos in a fight with Gonzalez, after Carlos turns Scott. Kate witnesses her mother overdosing on sleeping pills.
9	9	"Boxman"	Nick Copus	Matt Morgan & Ian Sobel	May 13, 2014
Newly turned Richie must help Seth pass a "survival test", wherein they reenact the robbery that led to Seth's imprisonment. During the test, Seth learns Richie killed their father, when they were kids, by setting him on fire. Tanner helps Kate through the temple, after the group is separated from one another. Tanner leads Kate to a sacrificial room, hoping to appease the culture he has studied all these years.
10	10	"The Take"	Dwight Little	Carlos Coto	May 20, 2014
Gonzalez realizes Tanner is a cult fanatic and saves Kate by killing him. Alone with Scott, Jacob cannot bring himself to kill his son who has turned, while Scott bites his father, hoping Jacob will see that being a demon serves a better purpose. Kate must kill her father before he turns. The Geckos survive their test, but Richie swallows the serpent containing Santanico's blood, making him her prince. Carlos betrays her by siding with Narciso and the Nine Lords. He kidnaps Richie, wanting Seth to bring him the $30 million in oil bonds. A final battle ensues, before the sun rises to cleanse the bar/temple of its cult. Gonzalez is allowed to return to his family, Richie and Santanico head for the States, Carlos is condemned to the labyrinth, and Seth and Kate ride off together.

=== Season 2 (2015) ===
No. overall	No. in season	Title	Directed by	Written by	Original release date
11	1	"Opening Night"	Robert Rodriguez	Álvaro Rodríguez	August 25, 2015
Three months after the events of the season one finale, Santanico plots her revenge against the Nine Lords along with Richie, who uses the bodies of two local men to fake his and Seth's deaths. Back in Mexico, Seth and Kate hide in a hotel room; while Kate tries to find a way to save Scott, Seth attempts to move on from Richie and at the same time deals with a heroin addiction. At a local flea market, Kate develops a friendship with a teenager named Rafa and Seth convinces a woman named Sonja to make new identities for him and Kate. Meanwhile, Lord Malvado, the head of the Nine Lords arrives at the Titty Twister and confronts Narciso, angered over Santanico's escape. He resurrects an ancient warrior and now bounty hunter called the Regulator and instructs him to go after her and the Geckos. Carlos is revealed to have made it out of the labyrinth.
12	2	"In a Dark Time"	Eduardo Sánchez	Álvaro Rodríguez & Carlos Coto	September 1, 2015
At the Titty Twister, Carlos is confronted by Malvado over the stolen bond the Geckos have taken. Gonzalez makes an announcement on news outlets about the Geckos' apparent deaths. Professor Tanner, now a culebra, is enlisted by Narciso to help Malvado decipher the ancient bonds; he tells them of a reading called the Savini codex. Gonzalez heads to Tanner's house looking for more of his readings. Narciso persuades Scott to kill Carlos, but he is unable to go through with it. Seth and Kate find out about Richie's stunt and, as they're pulling off a heist at the flea market, the Regulator spots them. With Rafa's help, they are able to escape. After confronting each other over the heist and attempting to go separate ways, Seth returns when he realizes Kate needs the money they stole more than he does.
13	3	"Attack of the 50 Ft. Sex Machine"	Alejandro Brugués	Marcel Rodriguez	September 8, 2015
A group of immigrants including a young woman named Paloma are seen on the run in a forest. Sonja confronts Seth about the heist and he agrees to give her a share of the money. The two of them head to Houston, Texas, after Carlos tracks Seth down. Richie makes his way to a TV repair store owned by a relative named Uncle Eddie whom he convinces to let him in on his contacts, including a pimp by the name of Nathan Blanchard. Santanico and Richie arrive at an exotic club owned by Blanchard and offer him Paloma and the other young women. Tanner makes his way to Gonzalez's home in search of the Savini codex. He kills Tony, a local officer on guard outside and takes his form to enter the house. When Gonzalez returns they engage in a fight. Margaret gives Tanner the codex. The next morning, Gonzalez wakes up to find his wife and daughter gone.
14	4	"The Best Little Horror House in Texas"	Joe Menendez	Matt Morgan & Ian Sobel	September 15, 2015
At the Titty Twister, Carlos informs Malvado that Santanico is coming after him. Richie and Santanico return to Blanchard's club and notice Carlos's arrival. He takes Paloma to a hotel room and attempts to turn her, but Santanico stops him. Kate returns to the Fuller home to find a deprived Scott who runs off to a party, prompting her to call Gonzalez for help. Unable to control his culebra instincts, Scott bites and kills a local teenage girl. Kate feels that she has failed to save Scott but doesn't give up on him and decides to help him bury the body. Scott tries to turn Kate but Gonzalez arrives before he can do it. Seth and Sonja arrive at Uncle Eddie's store and Seth also convinces Eddie to let him in on his connections. Seth and Sonja establish a relationship.
15	5	"Bondage"	Joe Menendez	Luisa Leschin	September 22, 2015
Seth ends up in a firefight with some of Blanchard's men. He finds the truck where Paloma and the other women are being kept, but the local sheriff arrives and hijacks it. Gonzalez questions Scott over the Savini codex and Malvado's plans. When Scott manages to get away, Kate is left feeling betrayed and joins forces with Gonzalez. Seth finds Malvado's hideout: a new bar called Jacknife Jed's. Santanico investigates Blanchard and Richie is tied up.
16	6	"Bizarre Tales"	Carlos Coto	Carlos Coto	September 29, 2015
Gonzalez finds countless ancient markings on the deceased bodies of young men; he uses his blood on a deceased body and has a vision of a pile of bodies behind an unidentified Lord. He and Kate uncover case files hidden by Earl McGraw at the police station in relation to their research, which leads them to a mansion hidden in the woods belonging to Celestino Oculto, another Lord who has plenty to reveal. Malvado and the Regulator arrive at Oculto's mansion; Malvado kills Oculto and takes with him a mysterious ancient key. The Geckos, Santanico and Sonja plan their next move towards Malvado; Santanico sees that Sonja is hiding something. Carlos is taken back to the Titty Twister by the Regulator; he proposes partnership to Narciso but ends up killing him. With Scott's help, Carlos exits and blows up the Twister.
17	7	"Bring Me the Head of Santanico Pandemonium"	Dwight Little	Diego Gutierrez	October 6, 2015
Santanico suggests to Richie that he steal Uncle Eddie's plans; he eventually agrees to do it but Eddie figures them out and as he looks for his plans, he realizes Seth had taken them earlier. The Regulator suddenly appears at Santanico and Richie's hideout and shoots her. Eddie attempts to choke the Regulator, prompting Seth to shoot him with his own gun. The Regulator launches Eddie to a post and turns into stone. To honor Eddie's final wishes, the Gecko brothers agree to work together. Richie and Santanico reveal their culebra form to Sonja. At Jacknife Jed's, Seth and a disguised Richie trick Malvado into making a deal in exchange for Santanico. Gonzalez and Kate are ambushed at Oculto's mansion by Carlos and Scott, who are after the bond Gonzalez took. Although they escape, Kate changes her mind and gives Scott the bond, thinking it will help him.
18	8	"The Last Temptation of Richard Gecko"	Eduardo Sánchez	Álvaro Rodríguez & Marcel Rodriguez	October 13, 2015
Somewhere in the desert, Carlos, Tanner, Scott and Kate finally solve the ancient codex and complete a ritual. Gonzalez tracks down the Geckos and makes a deal with them. Gonzalez, the Geckos, Santanico and Sonja sneak into Greely's Meat Product factory. Carlos, Scott and Kate arrive at Jed's; Carlos makes a deal with Malvado, exchanging Kate for the ancient key. Sonja is revealed to have made a deal with Malvado; when Seth finds out he shoots her. Richie ends up in Malvado's office after he gets inside his head pretending to be Santanico. Carlos and Scott find out that Gonzalez took the ancient key, but as he escapes from the factory they take it back from him. As Santanico tries to find Richie, she has a vision of him accepting Malvado's proposal to take his place as the head of the Nine Lords.
19	9	"There Will Be Blood"	Joe Menendez	Matt Morgan & Ian Sobel	October 20, 2015
In 1912, a group of miners are seen digging under a well but when Prospector, one of the miners decides to go deeper into it, he releases a hidden pool of blood. He walks out possessed and kills the rest of the miners. In present day, Malvado brings out a captive Kate whom he uses to find out Carlos's whereabouts, and sends her and Richie after him to retrieve the ancient key. Paloma, who has been turned by Malvado, tells Santanico that he is departing to El Rey and a mysterious individual is making his way to Jacknife Jed's. Carlos finds the blood well and uses the ancient key to unlock the pool of blood. Richie and Kate arrive at the well, and after she tries to reach Scott, Carlos shoots her. Santanico and Malvado finally confront each other and he poisons her with his venom making her fall into an unconscious state. Malvado attempts to leave for El Rey with Santanico but she engages in a fight with and kills him with the help of Seth. Carlos attempts to bury Gonzalez alive.
20	10	"Santa Sangre"	Robert Rodriguez	Diego Gutierrez	October 27, 2015
Gonzalez is freed by a woman who mentions a female Lord that wants him to stop Carlos before he reaches his goal. Richie tries to convince Scott to save Kate by turning her, but she refuses it. Richie returns to Jed's and explains the truth behind his actions to Santanico and Seth. Carlos manipulates a remorseful Scott into pumping out the blood well. When they return to Jed's with the Santa Sangre, Santanico and Carlos get into an altercation, meanwhile Scott crashes the truck into the front of Jed's releasing the blood and initiating a feeding frenzy from the culebra employees towards the rest of the guests. The Geckos put a stop to it, killing off almost every culebra. Along with Santanico, Gonzalez and Scott, they manage to stop Carlos, who reveals that he can heal quickly due to beating the labyrinth; they decide to mutilate him and dispose of his body parts separately. The Geckos decide to run Jed's as the new Lords and Santanico departs. The remaining blood from the well enters Kate's body.

=== Season 3 (2016) ===
No. overall	No. in season	Title	Directed by	Written by	Original release date
21	1	"Head Games"	Dwight Little	Carlos Coto	September 6, 2016
After the Titty Twister's destruction, two demons rise from its ruins. The remaining seven Lords summon the Gecko brothers and announce that both are now collectors. Six months later, the brothers attempt to collect a tribune from bar owner Alonzo, while being watched by a mysterious man. The brothers return to Jacknife Jed's and Gonzalez is informed by Lord Verdugo's assistant Ximena that he must return to Jed's. The Lord and Ximena, the brothers, Gonzalez, and Alonzo gather for a meeting. There, Alonzo attempts to kill Verdugo and fails. He was being mind controlled by the Skull Keeper, a demon warrior. The demon eventually mind controls most of the employees of Jed's who attempt to steal hidden money. The brothers follow one of the employees to the demon's lair. The demon attempts to control Richie, who is saved by Seth. Many demons (including Skull Keeper and a man named Brasa) who escaped from underneath the Twister are prisoners from the underworld. Six Lords die in a trap by the two demons and the Lords' controlled henchmen, leaving Verdugo alive. Kate, who is still alive, joins Brasa at Skull Keeper's lair. He later gives her an amulet necklace.
22	2	"La Reina"	Robert Rodriguez	Diego Gutierrez	September 6, 2016
Five months ago, Kate breaks out of a psychiatric institution, while there, she identifies herself as an entity named 'Amaru'. In Waco, Texas, Gonzalez and Ximena investigate a trail of culebra attacks who lead themselves to a confrontation with Brasa. The Gecko brothers look for Santanico in hopes to persuade culebras to join them in the fight against the demons. She is revealed to be running an underground fight ring in Piedras Negras and is implied to be in a relationship with a woman named Manola. She initially rejects the brothers' offer, then Seth is forced into a match. Amaru and another demon named Olmeca arrive and get themselves into a fight with the brothers and Santanico. Manola is killed by Amaru and Olmeca is killed by Santanico. Santanico finally agrees to depart with the brothers again, while Amaru finds a concert ad for Scott and orders Brasa to find him.
23	3	"Protect and Serve"	Alejandro Brugués	Ian Sobel & Matt Morgan	September 13, 2016
While walking through an alley, a female culebra encounters a demon, who attacks her. Gonzalez, meanwhile, is living in a hotel and implied to be in a custody battle with his wife, Margaret. He enters his room, where a man awaits him and warns him about a figure. Santanico is revealed to have ditched the Gecko brothers, who re-group on who they can enlist in the current battle. Richie mentions an ancient hunter who may be alive that they can try to find and recruit. Tanner/Sex Machine returns as a professor in Longhorn, Texas who teaches archaeology at a university. Gonzalez eventually finds him at his house who converts his students into culebras. He convinces Tanner to help hunt down the mysterious figure, who Tanner reveals it is another demon. The demon arrives at Tanner's house and enslaves Tanner and his students as Gonzalez finds himself in Houston and encounters the demon at a ranch. Gonzalez calls the brothers in regards to the creature and current location; the brothers and Burt arrive and help Gonzalez and Tanner to destroy the creature. The brothers find the ancient hunter to a marijuana store who is a man named Burt. Amaru and the demons' origins are also revealed. Somewhere in the desert, Amaru/Kate approaches a cave where a portal opens including those kidnapped from the ranch are worshiping Amaru.
24	4	"Fanglorious"	Eagle Egilsson	Marcel Rodriguez	September 20, 2016
Scott is seen performing with his own rock band named 'Fanglorious' at a concert. Meanwhile, Richie preys on a man at a bar then he engages into a conversation with a female doctor named, Dr. Dakota Block. Scott reunites with Kate in a alley who warns him about Amaru before transforming back into the entity and nearly assimilates him until Gonzalez arrives who saves him. Gonzalez informs the Gecko brothers at their new base over his and Scott's confrontation with Amaru who they believe that the humane nature of Kate is still there. Amaru is also seen preying on a male human being at an isolated church and informs Brasa to send another set of demons - a jaguar-skinned hunter named Zolo and two of his soldiers. The brothers and Gonzalez are ambushed by the three demons at their base. Scott meets up with his band at a junkyard before all parties find each other leading into confrontations. Amaru nearly succeeds in assimilating Scott and Seth before Scott stabs Amaru with one of his swords as they escape. Richie is shown at the same bar and leaves with Dr. Block before the woman reveals herself to being Earl McGraw's daughter.
25	5	"Shady Glen"	Eduardo Sanchez	Sarah Wise	September 27, 2016
When Brasa releases a swarm of cannibalistic locusts, a neighborhood named "Shady Glen" is attacked by the mysterious insects including possessing civilians while the Gecko brothers also face another threat in the form of Earl McGraw's daughter, Dakota who is out for her own revenge for her father's death. The team manages to trace the source of the attacks to the local sewers. Dakota joins the group and Seth is possessed by the insects. Later on, Tanner, Burt, and Scott manages to trace the source in the sewer in the form of a queen creature as the three destroy the creature and return the town to normal. Amaru and Brasa manage to hold a mother and her son hostage as bait when Richie, Gonzalez, and Ximena track them down leading to another confrontation by both groups then Richie being paralyzed by Amaru then taken by her and Brasa.
26	6	"Straitjacket"	Rebecca Rodriguez	Fernanda Coppel	October 4, 2016
Five months ago, Kate/Amaru is shown at the psychiatric institution where she is shown killing the staff by assimilation. In Xibalba, Richie is shown being dragged by a group of men into a portal door then he is shown waking up in the same psychiatric institution where Kate was held five months ago. He informs Seth and the group to his location only to be revealed as a trap where they are locked in different locations of the institution including killing a forgotten inmate. Gonzalez and Ximena are revealed to be in a relationship. Amaru persuades Richie to sacrifice Ximena in order to fulfill her plan, but he persuades her that it would better to take Seth instead. Another confrontation starts after Gonzalez attempts to save Seth, but he is possessed also and kills Ximena. Seth saves Richie by setting him on fire bringing him back to normal including somehow Gonzalez who notices Ximena's ashes much to his anger.
27	7	"La Llorona"	Diego Gutierrez	Diego Gutierrez	October 11, 2016
In a mansion, Tanner is seen part of a Xibalban ritual where a male culebra is sacrificed. The Gecko brothers and the rest of the group (with information by Tanner) arrive at the same mansion hoping to capture the Xibalban cult leader, but their plans change when Amaru arrives, as they end up taking her back to Burt's shop and holding her in a cell. Gonzalez feels guilt-ridden for what happened to Ximena. The group performs an exorcism on Amaru while at the same time they fall victim to the seductions of another demon - a female soul gatherer named Itzpa. Through visions, the group is alerted when Itzpa targets Gonzalez's wife, Margaret and his daughter as they are then taken by Amaru and the Xibalban cult hostage and Itzpa is killed by Burt.
28	8	"Rio Sangre"	Eagle Egilsson	Carlos Coto	October 18, 2016
Santanico returns with a secret and a potential new ally in the form of Carlos Madrigal who has been healed by her after being mutilated, prompting the Gecko brothers and the group to seek help from Lord Venganza, who has been hiding in a culebra prison. Eventually, all parties face yet another threat in the form of General Tatuaje – a general for Xibalban armies while Gonzalez is betrayed by a fellow ranger who attempts to hold him hostage for Amaru then in a desperate attempt to save his family he takes and uses Venganza as bait.
29	9	"Matanzas"	Joe Menendez	Marcel Rodriguez	October 25, 2016
The Gecko brothers and the rest of the group find themselves following Amaru to a mysterious Western ghost town in Matanzas, Texas but soon engage in a battle with an undead army of outlaws. Meanwhile, Venganza and Amaru confront each other, but Venganza decides to kill herself to prevent Amaru from killing her. Seth kills Brasa using explosives. Amaru kills Burt and fully succeeds in her ceremony as she regains her body.
30	10	"Dark Side of the Sun"	Joe Menendez	Ian Sobel & Matt Morgan	November 1, 2016
With Amaru renewed in the flesh, the Gecko brothers and the remainder of the team race against a pending eclipse to defeat her and close gates to Xibalba. Richie is held captive by Amaru. Kate regains consciousness after briefly falling comatose. Carlos reveals he failed the ancient labyrinth at the Titty Twister and made a deal with Xibalba for power, while Santanico decides to confront and fight Amaru. Meanwhile, Gonzalez takes his family to the local hospital for medical treatment, only for them to find a possessed Dakota and staff. The group, with Kate's help, finishes off Amaru and seals the gate of Xibalba. The Gecko brothers and Kate are then shown robbing a bank and a Ranger walks out of a ruined Xibalba gate to give Amaru's amulet to Ranger Gary Willet.

== Special ==
A companion special, titled On Set: Making of From Dusk till Dawn: The Series, aired on the El Rey network in February 2014. It featured behind-the-scenes exclusive interviews with the cast, crew and writers.

== Home releases ==
Season	Episodes	DVD and Blu-ray release date		
Season	Episodes	Region 1/A	Region 2/B	Region 4/B
1	10	September 16, 2014	September 22, 2014	September 24, 2014
2	10	February 6, 2016	TBA	TBA
3	10	February 7, 2017	TBA	TBA
