= List of Cops episodes (seasons 1–20) =

Cops (stylized as COPS) is an American documentary/reality legal series that follows police officers, constables, sheriff's deputies, federal agents and state troopers during patrols and other police activities including prostitution and narcotics stings. The show's formula follows the cinéma vérité convention, with no narration or scripted dialog, depending entirely on the commentary of the officers and on the actions of the people with whom they come into contact.

The show initially aired on Fox from March 11, 1989 to May 4, 2013 for 15 seasons and 752 total episodes. It is one of the longest-running television programs in the United States and, as of May 2011, the longest-running show on the network, following the cancellation of America's Most Wanted after 23 years.

Cops was canceled by Fox in 2013, following requests to do so by the nonprofit organization Color of Change. However, the series was soon picked up by Spike TV, a cable channel now known as Paramount Network. In 2020, the program was once again canceled, this time after its 32nd season. Despite its cancellation, production of a 33rd season began in September 2020, with the intentions of an international broadcast. In 2021, it was announced that Fox Nation picked up the show. The 33rd season premiered on October 1, 2021.

== Series overview ==
Season	Episodes		Originally released		
Season	Episodes		First released	Last released	Network
1	15		March 11, 1989	June 17, 1989	Fox
2	31		September 23, 1989	May 5, 1990	Fox
3	42		September 15, 1990	August 31, 1991	Fox
4	45		August 10, 1991	December 12, 1992	Fox
5	46		August 15, 1992	September 4, 1993	Fox
6	46		August 7, 1993	December 17, 1994	Fox
7	41		May 14, 1994	November 10, 1995	Fox
8	43		February 25, 1995	July 13, 1996	Fox
9	36		August 31, 1996	July 26, 1997	Fox
10	36		September 6, 1997	August 1, 1998	Fox
11	36		September 12, 1998	September 18, 1999	Fox
12	36		September 11, 1999	July 29, 2000	Fox
13	40		May 20, 2000	July 7, 2001	Fox
14	36		September 1, 2001	September 21, 2002	Fox
15	36		May 4, 2002	November 1, 2003	Fox
16	41		April 26, 2003	October 2, 2004	Fox
17	36		May 15, 2004	August 6, 2005	Fox
18	36		September 10, 2005	July 22, 2006	Fox
19	36		September 9, 2006	July 28, 2007	Fox
20	38		September 8, 2007	August 2, 2008	Fox
21	36		September 7, 2008	July 25, 2009	Fox
22	36		September 12, 2009	July 31, 2010	Fox
23	22		September 11, 2010	June 18, 2011	Fox
24	22		September 10, 2011	April 7, 2012	Fox
25	16		December 15, 2012	May 4, 2013	Fox
26	22		September 14, 2013	March 8, 2014	Spike
27	33		July 12, 2014	May 9, 2015	Spike
28	33		June 20, 2015	April 30, 2016	Spike
29	33		June 4, 2016	April 22, 2017	Spike
30	33	22	June 17, 2017	November 13, 2017	Spike
30	33	11	January 22, 2018	May 21, 2018	Paramount Network
31	33		June 4, 2018	May 20, 2019	Paramount Network
32	33		June 3, 2019	May 11, 2020	Paramount Network
33	33		October 1, 2021	July 8, 2022	Fox Nation
34	17		September 30, 2022	March 31, 2023	Fox Nation
35	TBA		April 7, 2023	TBA	Fox Nation

== Episodes ==
=== Season 1 (1989) ===
No. overall	No. in season	Title	Original release date	US viewers (millions)
1	1	"Broward County, Florida 1"	March 11, 1989	11.5
2	2	"Broward County, Florida 2"	March 18, 1989	9.4
3	3	"Broward County, Florida 3"	March 25, 1989	9.2
4	4	"Broward County, Florida 4"	April 1, 1989	7.7
5	5	"Broward County, Florida 5"	April 8, 1989	7.8
6	6	"Broward County, Florida 6"	April 15, 1989	7.0
7	7	"Broward County, Florida 7"	April 22, 1989	6.7
8	8	"Broward County, Florida 8"	April 29, 1989	8.4
9	9	"Broward County, Florida 9"	May 6, 1989	9.7
10	10	"Broward County, Florida 10"	May 13, 1989	8.9
11	11	"Broward County, Florida 11"	May 20, 1989	7.1
12	12	"Broward County, Florida 12"	May 27, 1989	7.0
13	13	"Broward County, Florida 13"	June 3, 1989	6.8
14	14	"Broward County, Florida 14"	June 10, 1989	7.7
15	15	"Russia 1 Hour Special"	June 17, 1989	6.7

=== Season 2 (1989–1990) ===
No. overall	No. in season	Title	Original release date	US viewers (millions)
16	1	"Portland, Multnomah County, Oregon 1"	September 23, 1989	9.4
17	2	"Portland, Multnomah County, Oregon 2"	September 30, 1989	8.6
18	3	"Portland, Multnomah County, Oregon 3"	October 7, 1989	9.8
19	4	"Portland, Multnomah County, Oregon 4"	October 14, 1989	6.4
20	5	"Portland, Multnomah County, Oregon 5"	October 21, 1989	9.4
21	6	"Portland, Multnomah County, Oregon 6"	October 28, 1989	8.2
22	7	"Portland, Multnomah County, Oregon 7"	November 4, 1989	10.9
23	8	"Portland, Multnomah County, Oregon 8"	November 11, 1989	10.2
24	9	"Portland, Multnomah County, Oregon 9"	November 18, 1989	10.1
25	10	"Portland, Multnomah County, Oregon 10"	November 25, 1989	12.7
26	11	"Portland, Multnomah County, Oregon 11"	December 2, 1989	11.3
27	12	"Portland, Multnomah County, Oregon 12"	December 9, 1989	11.2
28	13	"Portland, Multnomah County, Oregon 13"	December 16, 1989	9.4
29	14	"San Diego County, California 1"	December 23, 1989	10.1
30	15	"San Diego County, California 2"	January 6, 1990	12.2
31	16	"San Diego County, California 3"	January 13, 1990	12.7
32	17	"San Diego County, California 4"	January 20, 1990	13.8
33	18	"San Diego County, California 5"	January 27, 1990	10.9
34	19	"Los Angeles County, California 1"	February 3, 1990	10.8
35	20	"Los Angeles County, California 2"	February 10, 1990	11.5
36	21	"Los Angeles County, California 3"	February 17, 1990	13.2
37	22	"Los Angeles County, California 4"	February 24, 1990	12.5
38	23	"Los Angeles County, California 5"	March 3, 1990	11.3
39	24	"Los Angeles County, California 6"	March 10, 1990	8.9
40	25	"Los Angeles County, California 7"	March 17, 1990	11.9
41	26	"Los Angeles County, California 8"	March 24, 1990	10.9
42	27	"Los Angeles County, California 9"	April 7, 1990	10.9
43	28	"Los Angeles County, California 10"	April 14, 1990	10.5
44	29	"Los Angeles County, California 11"	April 21, 1990	10.1
45	30	"Los Angeles County, California 12"	April 28, 1990	11.0
46	31	"New Orleans, Louisiana: Mardi Gras 1990"	May 5, 1990	11.0

=== Season 3 (1990–1991) ===
No. overall	No. in season	Title	Original release date	US viewers (millions)
47	1	"Minneapolis, Minnesota 1"	September 15, 1990	7.6
48	2	"Minneapolis, Minnesota 2"	September 22, 1990	7.7
49	3	"Minneapolis, Minnesota 3"	September 29, 1990	7.6
50	4	"Minneapolis, Minnesota 4"	October 6, 1990	7.1
51	5	"Minneapolis, Minnesota 5"	October 13, 1990	8.8
52	6	"Minneapolis, Minnesota 6"	October 20, 1990	7.3
53	7	"Alaska 1"	October 27, 1990	8.6
54	8	"Alaska 2"	November 3, 1990	8.9
55	9	"Alaska 3"	November 10, 1990	10.1
56	10	"Alaska 4"	November 17, 1990	10.7
57	11	"Las Vegas, Nevada 1"	November 24, 1990	9.1
58	12	"Las Vegas, Nevada 2"	December 1, 1990	8.0
59	13	"Las Vegas, Nevada 3"	December 8, 1990	7.6
60	14	"Las Vegas, Nevada 4"	December 15, 1990	8.4
61	15	"Las Vegas, Nevada 5"	December 22, 1990	8.4
62	16	"Las Vegas, Nevada 6"	January 12, 1991	11.1
63	17	"Las Vegas, Nevada 7"	January 19, 1991	8.2
64	18	"New Jersey 1"	January 26, 1991	9.8
65	19	"New Jersey 2"	February 2, 1991	11.2
66	20	"New Jersey 3"	February 9, 1991	9.4
67	21	"New Jersey 4"	February 16, 1991	9.2
68	22	"New Jersey 5"	February 23, 1991	10.3
69	23	"Pittsburgh, Pennsylvania 1"	March 2, 1991	10.5
70	24	"Pittsburgh, Pennsylvania 2"	March 9, 1991	8.4
71	25	"Tampa, Hillsborough County, Florida 1"	March 9, 1991	9.6
72	26	"Tampa, Hillsborough County, Florida 2"	March 16, 1991	9.0
73	27	"Tucson, Arizona 1"	April 13, 1991	8.9
74	28	"Tucson, Arizona 2"	April 20, 1991	7.9
75	29	"Riverside County, California 1"	April 27, 1991	6.9
76	30	"Riverside County, California 2"	May 4, 1991	8.2
77	31	"Houston, Harris County, Texas 1"	May 11, 1991	7.4
78	32	"Houston, Harris County, Texas 2"	May 18, 1991	8.5
79	33	"Houston, Harris County, Texas 3"	May 25, 1991	5.9
80	34	"Houston, Harris County, Texas 4"	June 1, 1991	7.0
81	35	"Houston, Harris County, Texas 5"	June 8, 1991	6.8
82	36	"Houston, Harris County, Texas 6"	June 15, 1991	5.9
83	37	"London, England"	August 3, 1991	6.9
84	38	"Best of Cops"	June 29, 1991	6.5
85	39	"Best of Cops Part 1"	July 6, 1991	6.1
86	40	"Houston, Harris County, Texas 7"	August 10, 1991	8.9
87	41	"Las Vegas, Nevada 8"	June 22, 1991	9.4
88	42	"Houston, Harris County, Texas 8"	August 31, 1991	8.3

=== Season 4 (1991–1992) ===
No. overall	No. in season	Title	Original release date	US viewers (millions)
89	1	"Kansas City, Missouri; Kansas City, Kansas 1"	August 10, 1991	10.4
90	2	"Kansas City, Missouri; Kansas City, Kansas 2"	August 17, 1991	10.0
91	3	"Kansas City, Missouri; Kansas City, Kansas 3"	August 24, 1991	8.5
92	4	"Kansas City, Missouri; Kansas City, Kansas 4"	September 14, 1991	9.7
93	5	"Pittsburgh, Pennsylvania 3"	September 28, 1991	10.3
94	6	"Kansas City, Missouri; Kansas City, Kansas 5"	October 5, 1991	11.3
95	7	"Kansas City, Missouri; Kansas City, Kansas 6"	October 12, 1991	10.8
96	8	"Kansas City, Missouri; Kansas City, Kansas 7"	October 19, 1991	11.4
97	9	"Pittsburgh, Pennsylvania 4"	October 26, 1991	10.5
98	10	"Pittsburgh, Pennsylvania 5"	November 2, 1991	10.1
99	11	"Boston-Lynn, Massachusetts 1"	November 9, 1991	10.5
100	12	"Boston-Lynn, Massachusetts 2"	November 16, 1991	11.6
101	13	"Boston-Lynn, Massachusetts 3"	November 23, 1991	12.5
102	14	"Kansas City, Missouri; Kansas City, Kansas 8"	December 7, 1991	11.5
103	15	"Boston-Lynn Massachusetts 4"	December 7, 1991	14.6
104	16	"Boston-Lynn Massachusetts 5"	December 14, 1991	10.9
105	17	"Pittsburgh, Pennsylvania 6"	December 21, 1991	11.0
106	18	"Pittsburgh, Pennsylvania 7"	January 4, 1992	12.2
107	19	"Memphis, Shelby County, Tennessee 1"	January 11, 1992	12.3
108	20	"Memphis, Shelby County, Tennessee 2"	January 18, 1992	14.5
109	21	"Memphis, Shelby County, Tennessee 3"	January 25, 1992	13.2
110	22	"Memphis, Shelby County, Tennessee 4"	February 1, 1992	13.3
111	23	"United States: U.S. Marshals"	February 7, 1992	9.5
112	24	"Memphis, Shelby County, Tennessee 5"	February 15, 1992	12.8
113	25	"Metro-Dade, South Florida 1"	February 22, 1992	13.2
114	26	"Metro-Dade, South Florida 2"	February 22, 1992	13.7
115	27	"Metro-Dade, South Florida 3"	March 7, 1992	11.1
116	28	"Metro-Dade, South Florida 4"	March 14, 1992	13.2
117	29	"Boston-Lynn Massachusetts 6"	March 21, 1992	14.6
118	30	"Metro-Dade, South Florida 5"	March 21, 1992	15.9
119	31	"Boston-Lynn Massachusetts 7"	April 4, 1992	12.8
120	32	"Metro-Dade, South Florida 6"	April 11, 1992	10.0
121	33	"Metro-Dade, South Florida 7"	April 25, 1992	10.2
122	34	"Metro-Dade, South Florida 8"	May 2, 1992	9.0
123	35	"Metro-Dade, South Florida 9"	May 9, 1992	9.0
124	36	"Metro-Dade, South Florida 10"	May 16, 1992	10.1
125	37	"Memphis, Shelby County, Tennessee 6"	May 30, 1992	11.6
126	38	"Metro-Dade, South Florida 11"	May 30, 1992	13.7
127	39	"Metro-Dade, South Florida 12"	June 13, 1992	8.6
128	40	"Washington State 1"	June 20, 1992	9.3
129	41	"Metro-Dade, South Florida 13"	June 27, 1992	9.3
130	42	"Washington State 2"	August 1, 1992	7.4
131	43	"Washington State 3"	August 8, 1992	7.1
132	44	"Washington State 4"	August 15, 1992	11.2
133	45	"Washington State 5"	December 12, 1992	14.2

=== Season 5 (1992–1993) ===
No. overall	No. in season	Title	Original release date	US viewers (millions)
134	1	"Philadelphia, Pennsylvania 1"	August 15, 1992	12.9
135	2	"Philadelphia, Pennsylvania 2"	August 22, 1992	10.1
136	3	"Philadelphia, Pennsylvania 3"	August 29, 1992	10.0
137	4	"Philadelphia, Pennsylvania 4"	September 5, 1992	11.7
138	5	"Philadelphia, Pennsylvania 5"	September 12, 1992	10.2
139	6	"Washington State 6"	September 19, 1992	12.4
140	7	"Washington State 7"	September 26, 1992	14.6
141	8	"Washington State 8"	October 3, 1992	14.1
142	9	"Philadelphia, Pennsylvania 6"	October 10, 1992	13.8
143	10	"Philadelphia, Pennsylvania 7"	October 24, 1992	12.0
144	11	"Denver, Colorado 1"	October 31, 1992	11.6
145	12	"Homicide USA Special Edition"	November 7, 1992	14.2
146	13	"Denver, Colorado 2"	November 14, 1992	15.2
147	14	"Denver, Colorado 3"	November 21, 1992	16.4
148	15	"Washington State 9"	December 5, 1992	14.5
149	16	"Washington State 10"	December 19, 1992	12.9
150	17	"Washington State 11"	January 2, 1993	13.9
151	18	"Denver, Colorado 4"	January 9, 1993	15.4
152	19	"Denver, Colorado 5"	January 16, 1993	15.1
153	20	"Denver, Colorado 6"	January 23, 1993	15.8
154	21	"Denver, Colorado 7"	January 30, 1993	N/A
155	22	"Fort Worth, Texas 1"	February 6, 1993	13.4
156	23	"Fort Worth, Texas 2"	February 13, 1993	14.3
157	24	"Fort Worth, Texas 3"	February 20, 1993	15.5
158	25	"Fort Worth, Texas 4"	February 27, 1993	13.7
159	26	"Denver, Colorado 8"	March 6, 1993	14.9
160	27	"Fort Worth, Texas 5"	March 20, 1993	15.8
161	28	"Fort Worth, Texas 6"	March 27, 1993	16.8
162	29	"Fort Worth, Texas 7"	April 3, 1993	15.4
163	30	"Denver, Colorado 9"	April 10, 1993	12.7
164	31	"Fort Worth, Texas 8"	April 17, 1993	12.3
165	32	"Fort Worth, Texas 9"	April 24, 1993	12.7
166	33	"Phoenix, Arizona 3"	May 1, 1993	11.8
167	34	"Phoenix, Arizona 4"	May 8, 1993	9.3
168	35	"Fort Worth, Texas 10"	May 15, 1993	9.7
169	36	"Fort Worth, Texas 11"	May 16, 1993	12.1
170	37	"Fort Worth, Texas 12"	May 22, 1993	10.6
171	38	"United States Special Edition"	May 29, 1993	10.7
172	39	"Phoenix, Arizona 5"	June 5, 1993	12.8
173	40	"Phoenix, Arizona 6"	June 26, 1993	9.4
174	41	"DEA Special Edition (South America & United States)"	July 3, 1993	8.7
175	42	"San Bernardino County, California 1"	July 10, 1993	10.8
176	43	"San Bernardino County, California 2"	July 17, 1993	10.3
177	44	"San Bernardino County, California 3"	July 24, 1993	9.8
178	45	"San Bernardino County, California 4"	July 31, 1993	9.9
179	46	"San Bernardino County, California 5"	September 4, 1993	9.7

=== Season 6 (1993–1994) ===
No. overall	No. in season	Title	Original release date	US viewers (millions)
180	1	"Nashville, Tennessee 1"	August 7, 1993	9.9
181	2	"Nashville, Tennessee 2"	August 14, 1993	10.2
182	3	"Nashville, Tennessee 3"	August 21, 1993	9.1
183	4	"Nashville, Tennessee 4"	August 28, 1993	10.5
184	5	"Nashville, Tennessee 5"	September 11, 1993	11.7
185	6	"Nashville, Tennessee 6"	September 18, 1993	N/A
186	7	"Nashville, Tennessee 7"	September 25, 1993	11.4
187	8	"Nashville, Tennessee 8"	October 2, 1993	9.9
188	9	"Sacramento, California 1"	October 9, 1993	12.9
189	10	"Sacramento, California 2"	October 16, 1993	13.2
190	11	"Sacramento, California 3"	October 23, 1993	10.1
191	12	"Sacramento, California 4"	October 30, 1993	10.9
192	13	"Cops in Hot Pursuit Special Edition"	November 6, 1993	12.9
193	14	"Cleveland, Ohio 1"	November 13, 1993	13.2
194	15	"Cleveland, Ohio 2"	November 20, 1993	12.8
195	16	"Cleveland, Ohio 3"	November 27, 1993	14.1
196	17	"Cleveland, Ohio 4"	December 4, 1993	12.5
197	18	"Cleveland, Ohio 5"	December 11, 1993	10.7
198	19	"El Paso, Texas 1"	December 11, 1993	10.4
199	20	"New York City Subway Special Edition"	January 1, 1994	11.2
200	21	"El Paso, Texas 2"	December 18, 1993	13.0
201	22	"Sacramento, California 5"	January 15, 1994	13.8
202	23	"Cleveland, Ohio 6"	January 22, 1994	13.0
203	24	"Sacramento, California 6"	January 29, 1994	12.7
204	25	"Little Rock, Arkansas 1"	February 5, 1994	13.3
205	26	"Cleveland, Ohio 7"	February 12, 1994	12.3
206	27	"El Paso, Texas 3"	January 8, 1994	10.0
207	28	"Cleveland, Ohio 8"	February 26, 1994	10.2
208	29	"El Paso, Texas 4"	February 19, 1994	10.8
209	30	"El Paso, Texas 5"	March 5, 1994	12.0
210	31	"Sacramento, California 7"	March 26, 1994	11.6
211	32	"El Paso, Texas 6"	March 19, 1994	10.6
212	33	"Sacramento, California 8"	April 9, 1994	10.2
213	34	"Little Rock, Arkansas 2"	April 16, 1994	11.1
214	35	"Sacramento, California 9"	April 23, 1994	10.0
215	36	"Indianapolis, Indiana 1"	April 30, 1994	9.4
216	37	"Indianapolis, Indiana 2"	May 7, 1994	10.1
217	38	"Nashville, Tennessee 9"	June 4, 1994	8.4
218	39	"Hong Kong Special Edition"	June 18, 1994	7.5
219	40	"Little Rock, Arkansas 3"	June 18, 1994	9.5
220	41	"Little Rock, Arkansas 4"	July 9, 1994	8.7
221	42	"Indianapolis, Indiana 3"	September 3, 1994	8.3
222	43	"Indianapolis, Indiana 4"	September 10, 1994	7.8
223	44	"Indianapolis, Indiana 5"	September 17, 1994	8.8
224	45	"Indianapolis, Indiana 6"	September 24, 1994	9.7
225	46	"El Paso, Texas 7"	April 2, 1994	10.5

=== Season 7 (1994–1995) ===
No. overall	No. in season	Title	Original release date	US viewers (millions)
226	1	"Los Angeles County, California 13"	May 14, 1994	10.0
227	2	"Los Angeles County, California 14"	May 21, 1994	8.7
228	3	"Los Angeles County, California 15"	July 30, 1994	7.9
229	4	"Los Angeles County, California 16"	August 6, 1994	7.3
230	5	"Los Angeles County, California 17"	August 13, 1994	8.6
231	6	"Los Angeles County, California 18"	August 20, 1994	8.9
232	7	"Los Angeles County, California 19"	October 1, 1994	8.9
233	8	"Los Angeles County, California 20"	October 8, 1994	9.0
234	9	"Los Angeles County, California 21"	October 15, 1994	10.0
235	10	"New York, New York 1"	October 20, 1994	11.8
236	11	"New York, New York 2"	October 20, 1994	12.2
237	12	"Los Angeles County, California 22"	October 22, 1994	10.2
238	13	"Los Angeles County, California 23"	October 29, 1994	10.1
239	14	"New York, New York 3"	November 5, 1994	10.3
240	15	"New York, New York 4"	November 12, 1994	11.0
241	16	"Kansas City, Missouri; Kansas City, Kansas 9"	November 19, 1994	12.5
242	17	"Kansas City, Missouri; Kansas City, Kansas 10"	November 26, 1994	11.0
243	18	"Los Angeles County, California 24"	December 3, 1994	11.7
244	19	"Los Angeles County, California 25"	December 10, 1994	10.7
245	20	"Los Angeles County, California 26"	January 7, 1995	12.1
246	21	"Los Angeles County, California 27"	January 21, 1995	13.4
247	22	"Kansas City, Missouri; Kansas City, Kansas 11"	February 4, 1995	11.3
248	23	"Las Vegas, Nevada 9"	February 11, 1995	12.0
249	24	"Las Vegas, Nevada 10"	February 18, 1995	11.8
250	25	"Las Vegas, Nevada 11"	March 4, 1995	11.6
251	26	"Kansas City, Missouri; Kansas City, Kansas 12"	March 18, 1995	11.3
252	27	"Kansas City, Missouri; Kansas City, Kansas 13"	April 1, 1995	9.5
253	28	"Kansas City, Missouri; Kansas City, Kansas 14"	April 8, 1995	9.9
254	29	"Las Vegas, Nevada 12"	April 15, 1995	10.7
255	30	"Kansas City, Missouri; Kansas City, Kansas 15"	April 29, 1995	8.2
256	31	"Las Vegas, Nevada 13"	May 6, 1995	8.9
257	32	"Kansas City, Missouri; Kansas City, Kansas 16"	May 13, 1995	8.9
258	33	"Los Angeles, California 28"	May 20, 1995	8.2
259	34	"Las Vegas, Nevada 14"	July 8, 1995	8.5
260	35	"Los Angeles, California 29"	July 15, 1995	8.6
261	36	"Las Vegas, Nevada 15"	July 22, 1995	8.4
262	37	"Best of Cops Part 2"	November 6, 1995	N/A
263	38	"Best of Cops Part 3"	November 7, 1995	N/A
264	39	"Best of Cops Part 4"	November 8, 1995	N/A
265	40	"Best of Cops Part 5"	November 9, 1995	N/A
266	41	"Best of Cops Part 6"	November 10, 1995	N/A

=== Season 8 (1995–1996) ===
No. overall	No. in season	Title	Original release date	US viewers (millions)
267	1	"Tampa, Hillsborough County, Florida 3"	September 2, 1995	8.1
268	2	"Fort Worth, Texas 13"	September 9, 1995	9.5
269	3	"Tampa, Hillsborough County, Florida 4"	September 16, 1995	7.6
270	4	"Dallas, Texas 1"	September 23, 1995	7.4
271	5	"Tampa, Hillsborough County, Florida 5"	September 30, 1995	8.5
272	6	"Buffalo, New York 1"	October 7, 1995	8.6
273	7	"Tampa, Hillsborough County, Florida 6"	October 14, 1995	8.2
274	8	"Buffalo, New York 2"	October 21, 1995	7.4
275	9	"Dallas, Texas 2"	October 28, 1995	6.1
276	10	"Dallas, Texas 3"	November 11, 1995	9.3
277	11	"Tampa, Hillsborough County, Florida 7"	November 18, 1995	6.8
278	12	"Tampa, Hillsborough County, Florida 8"	November 25, 1995	8.3
279	13	"Fort Worth, Texas 14"	December 2, 1995	9.0
280	14	"Buffalo, New York 3"	December 9, 1995	10.1
281	15	"Buffalo, New York 4"	December 23, 1995	10.4
282	16	"Buffalo, New York 5"	January 6, 1996	13.1
283	17	"Buffalo, New York 6"	January 13, 1996	11.1
284	18	"Buffalo, New York 7"	January 27, 1996	9.6
285	19	"Albuquerque, New Mexico 1"	February 3, 1996	11.9
286	20	"Best Chases Special Edition"	February 5, 1996	N/A
287	21	"911 Calls Special Edition"	February 6, 1996	N/A
288	22	"Best Drug Busts 1 Special Edition"	February 7, 1996	N/A
289	23	"Best Stings Special Edition"	February 8, 1996	N/A
290	24	"Classic Cops Special Edition"	February 9, 1996	N/A
291	25	"Albuquerque, New Mexico 2"	February 10, 1996	9.5
292	26	"New Orleans, Louisiana: Mardi Gras 1995 (Part 1)"	February 17, 1996	11.2
293	27	"New Orleans, Louisiana: Mardi Gras 1995 (Part 2)"	February 24, 1996	11.7
294	28	"Tampa, Hillsborough County, Florida 9"	March 2, 1996	11.2
295	29	"Tampa, Hillsborough County, Florida 10"	March 16, 1996	11.1
296	30	"Tampa, Hillsborough County, Florida 11"	March 23, 1996	11.6
297	31	"New Orleans, Louisiana"	March 25, 1996	10.3
298	32	"Dallas, Texas 4"	March 30, 1996	9.0
299	33	"Albuquerque, New Mexico 3"	April 6, 1996	9.4
300	34	"Albuquerque, New Mexico 4"	April 13, 1996	9.4
301	35	"Orange County, California 1"	April 27, 1996	7.9
302	36	"Albuquerque, New Mexico 5"	May 4, 1996	7.6
303	37	"Dallas, Texas 5"	May 11, 1996	7.8
304	38	"Albuquerque, New Mexico 6"	May 18, 1996	7.1
305	39	"Albuquerque, New Mexico 7"	May 25, 1996	7.9
306	40	"Albuquerque, New Mexico 8"	June 22, 1996	6.7
307	41	"Albuquerque, New Mexico 9"	June 29, 1996	6.8
308	42	"Orange County, California 2"	July 6, 1996	6.4
309	43	"Orange County, California 3"	July 13, 1996	7.6

=== Season 9 (1996–1997) ===
No. overall	No. in season	Title	Original release date	US viewers (millions)
310	1	"Miami-Homestead, Florida 12"	August 31, 1996	7.0
311	2	"Miami-Homestead, Florida 13"	September 7, 1996	7.4
312	3	"Miami-Homestead, Florida 14"	September 21, 1996	8.0
313	4	"Miami-Homestead, Florida 15"	September 28, 1996	8.2
314	5	"Miami-Homestead, Florida 16"	October 5, 1996	7.9
315	6	"Miami-Homestead, Florida 17"	October 12, 1996	7.4
316	7	"Miami-Homestead, Florida 18"	November 2, 1996	8.9
317	8	"Boston, Massachusetts/New City, Massachusetts"	November 2, 1996	9.5
318	9	"Providence, Rhode Island 1"	November 9, 1996	7.8
319	10	"Providence, Rhode Island 2"	November 16, 1996	9.0
320	11	"Providence, Rhode Island/Boston, Massachusetts 1"	November 23, 1996	8.7
321	12	"Miami-Homestead, Florida 19"	November 30, 1996	8.6
322	13	"Miami-Homestead, Florida 20"	December 7, 1996	8.3
323	14	"Providence, Rhode Island/Boston, Massachusetts 2"	December 21, 1996	8.4
324	15	"Boston-Lynn Massachusetts 8"	January 4, 1997	10.43
325	16	"Seattle; Tacoma, WA 12"	January 11, 1997	10.28
326	17	"Seattle; Tacoma, WA 13"	January 25, 1997	9.28
327	18	"Seattle; Tacoma, WA 14"	February 1, 1997	9.43
328	19	"Seattle; Tacoma, WA 15"	February 8, 1997	10.51
329	20	"Seattle; Tacoma, WA 16"	February 15, 1997	9.60
330	21	"Seattle; Tacoma, WA 17"	February 22, 1997	8.75
331	22	"Seattle; Tacoma, WA 18"	March 8, 1997	9.43
332	23	"Seattle; Tacoma, WA 19"	March 22, 1997	9.41
333	24	"Fresno, California 1"	March 29, 1997	8.74
334	25	"Fresno, California 2"	April 12, 1997	9.24
335	26	"Fresno, California 3"	April 19, 1997	7.55
336	27	"Fort Myers, Florida 1"	April 26, 1997	7.88
337	28	"Seattle; Tacoma, WA 20"	May 3, 1997	7.37
338	29	"Fort Myers, Florida 2"	May 10, 1997	7.54
339	30	"Washington State 21"	May 17, 1997	6.67
340	31	"Washington State 22"	June 7, 1997	7.30
341	32	"Fort Myers, Florida 3"	June 14, 1997	6.25
342	33	"Fort Myers, Florida 4"	June 21, 1997	5.70
343	34	"Fort Myers, Florida 5"	July 12, 1997	5.98
344	35	"Fort Myers, Florida 6"	July 19, 1997	6.22
345	36	"Fresno, California 4"	July 26, 1997	6.17

=== Season 10 (1997–1998) ===
No. overall	No. in season	Title	Original release date	US viewers (millions)
346	1	"Las Vegas, Nevada 16"	September 6, 1997	6.29
347	2	"Las Vegas, Nevada 17"	September 13, 1997	8.10
348	3	"Las Vegas, Nevada 18"	September 20, 1997	8.59
349	4	"Las Vegas, Nevada 19"	September 27, 1997	7.74
350	5	"Las Vegas, Nevada 20"	October 4, 1997	7.93
351	6	"Las Vegas, Nevada 21"	October 11, 1997	N/A
352	7	"Las Vegas, Nevada 22"	October 25, 1997	8.89
353	8	"Las Vegas, Nevada 23"	November 1, 1997	9.76
354	9	"Kansas City, Missouri; Kansas City, Kansas 17"	November 8, 1997	10.38
355	10	"Las Vegas, Nevada 24"	November 15, 1997	10.21
356	11	"Kansas City, Missouri; Kansas City, Kansas 18"	November 22, 1997	10.29
357	12	"Las Vegas, Nevada 25"	December 6, 1997	9.31
358	13	"Las Vegas, Nevada 26"	December 13, 1997	9.06
359	14	"Kansas City, Missouri; Kansas City, Kansas 19"	January 10, 1998	9.06
360	15	"Kansas City, Missouri; Kansas City, Kansas 20"	January 17, 1998	8.60
361	16	"Las Vegas, Nevada 27"	January 24, 1998	10.62
362	17	"Kansas City, Missouri; Kansas City, Kansas 21"	January 31, 1998	9.36
363	18	"Houston, Texas 9"	February 7, 1998	10.57
364	19	"Sturgis Bike Rally Special Edition 1997"	February 7, 1998	9.03
365	20	"Las Vegas Prostitution Special Edition"	February 14, 1998	8.76
366	21	"Houston, Texas 10"	February 14, 1998	9.75
367	22	"Houston, Texas 11"	February 21, 1998	8.53
368	23	"Kansas City, Missouri; Kansas City, Kansas 22"	February 28, 1998	9.48
369	24	"Kansas City, Missouri; Kansas City, Kansas 23"	March 7, 1998	8.94
370	25	"Las Vegas, Nevada 29"	March 14, 1998	8.90
371	26	"Nashville, Tennessee 10"	April 4, 1998	8.39
372	27	"Houston, Texas 12"	April 18, 1998	7.82
373	28	"Houston, Texas 13"	April 25, 1998	8.66
374	29	"Kansas City, Missouri; Kansas City, Kansas 24"	May 2, 1998	7.52
375	30	"Houston, Texas 14"	May 9, 1998	6.73
376	31	"Kansas City, Missouri; Kansas City, Kansas 25"	May 16, 1998	6.35
377	32	"Nashville, Tennessee 11"	June 20, 1998	6.34
378	33	"Nashville, Tennessee 12"	June 27, 1998	7.33
379	34	"Kansas City, Missouri; Kansas City, Kansas 26"	July 18, 1998	6.42
380	35	"Houston, Texas 15"	July 25, 1998	5.80
381	36	"Kansas City, Missouri; Kansas City, Kansas 27"	August 1, 1998	6.00

=== Season 11 (1998–1999) ===
No. overall	No. in season	Title	Original release date	US viewers (millions)
382	1	"Atlanta, Georgia 1"	September 12, 1998	6.76
383	2	"Atlanta, Georgia 2"	September 19, 1998	7.94
384	3	"Atlanta, Georgia 3"	September 26, 1998	7.27
385	4	"Atlanta, Georgia 4"	October 3, 1998	7.01
386	5	"Atlanta, Georgia 5"	October 10, 1998	7.63
387	6	"Atlanta, Georgia 6"	October 24, 1998	7.84
388	7	"Atlanta, Georgia 7"	October 24, 1998	9.17
389	8	"Virginia Beach, Virginia 1"	October 31, 1998	9.26
390	9	"Virginia Beach, Virginia 2"	November 7, 1998	9.29
391	10	"Virginia Beach, Virginia 3"	November 14, 1998	8.96
392	11	"Virginia Beach, Virginia 4"	November 21, 1998	9.24
393	12	"Atlanta, Georgia 8"	December 5, 1998	8.94
394	13	"Atlanta, Georgia 9"	December 19, 1998	8.24
395	14	"Atlanta, Georgia 10"	January 9, 1999	11.34
396	15	"Atlanta, Georgia 11"	January 16, 1999	9.40
397	16	"Atlanta, Georgia 12"	January 23, 1999	9.79
398	17	"Palm Beach County, Florida 1"	January 30, 1999	11.71
399	18	"Palm Beach County, Florida 2"	February 6, 1999	9.46
400	19	"Palm Beach County, Florida 3"	February 13, 1999	8.76
401	20	"Palm Beach County, Florida 4"	February 20, 1999	9.20
402	21	"Palm Beach County, Florida 5"	February 27, 1999	8.32
403	22	"Atlanta, Georgia 13"	March 6, 1999	9.72
404	23	"Virginia Beach, Virginia 5"	March 13, 1999	9.57
405	24	"Palm Beach County, Florida 6"	March 27, 1999	8.55
406	25	"Virginia Beach, Virginia 6"	April 3, 1999	8.43
407	26	"Palm Beach County, Florida 7"	April 10, 1999	7.10
408	27	"Palm Beach County, Florida 8"	April 24, 1999	7.14
409	28	"Arizona 7"	May 1, 1999	6.17
410	29	"Arizona 8"	May 8, 1999	7.41
411	30	"Arizona 9"	May 15, 1999	6.53
412	31	"Arizona 10"	May 22, 1999	6.68
413	32	"Palm Beach County, Florida 9"	June 12, 1999	6.16
414	33	"Palm Beach County, Florida 10"	June 26, 1999	7.07
415	34	"Arizona 11"	July 31, 1999	6.77
416	35	"Palm Beach County, Florida 11"	September 4, 1999	6.98
417	36	"Arizona 12"	September 18, 1999	6.78

=== Season 12 (1999–2000) ===
No. overall	No. in season	Title	Original release date	US viewers (millions)
418	1	"Indianapolis, Indiana 7"	September 11, 1999	6.79
419	2	"Indianapolis, Indiana 8"	September 25, 1999	7.16
420	3	"Indianapolis, Indiana 9"	October 2, 1999	7.20
421	4	"Indianapolis, Indiana 10"	October 9, 1999	6.90
422	5	"Indianapolis, Indiana 11"	October 30, 1999	6.95
423	6	"Indianapolis, Indiana 12"	November 6, 1999	7.13
424	7	"Fort Worth, Texas 15"	November 6, 1999	8.90
425	8	"Fort Worth, Texas 16 (Chases Special Edition)"	November 13, 1999	7.27
426	9	"Fort Worth, Texas 17"	November 20, 1999	7.33
427	10	"Fort Worth, Texas 18"	November 27, 1999	8.68
428	11	"Fort Worth, Texas 19"	December 4, 1999	8.50
429	12	"Indianapolis, Indiana 13"	December 11, 1999	8.45
430	13	"Indianapolis, Indiana 14"	December 18, 1999	8.44
431	14	"Fort Worth, Texas 20"	January 8, 2000	8.93
432	15	"Indianapolis, Indiana 15"	January 15, 2000	9.06
433	16	"Indianapolis, Indiana 16"	January 15, 2000	9.41
434	17	"Fort Worth, Texas 21"	January 22, 2000	8.26
435	18	"Fort Worth, Texas 22"	January 29, 2000	8.59
436	19	"Albuquerque, New Mexico 10"	February 5, 2000	8.00
437	20	"Albuquerque, New Mexico 11"	February 12, 2000	8.57
438	21	"Albuquerque, New Mexico 12"	February 19, 2000	9.28
439	22	"Fort Worth, Texas 23"	February 19, 2000	8.65
440	23	"Albuquerque, New Mexico 13"	February 26, 2000	8.33
441	24	"Fort Worth, Texas 24"	March 4, 2000	8.55
442	25	"Fort Worth, Texas 25"	March 18, 2000	8.68
443	26	"Fort Worth, Texas 26"	March 25, 2000	7.84
444	27	"Fort Worth, Texas 27"	April 8, 2000	7.85
445	28	"Albuquerque, New Mexico 14"	April 15, 2000	7.73
446	29	"Fort Worth, Texas 28"	April 22, 2000	8.36
447	30	"Albuquerque, New Mexico 15"	April 29, 2000	7.41
448	31	"Albuquerque, New Mexico 16"	May 6, 2000	6.61
449	32	"Albuquerque, New Mexico 17"	May 13, 2000	5.98
450	33	"Albuquerque, New Mexico 18"	May 20, 2000	7.02
451	34	"Albuquerque, New Mexico 19"	July 15, 2000	5.84
452	35	"Albuquerque, New Mexico 20"	July 22, 2000	5.73
453	36	"Albuquerque, New Mexico 21"	July 29, 2000	5.82

=== Season 13 (2000–2001) ===
No. overall	No. in season	Title	Original release date	US viewers (millions)
454	1	"Jacksonville, Florida 1"	May 20, 2000	8.09
455	2	"Jacksonville, Florida 2"	August 19, 2000	6.58
456	3	"Jacksonville, Florida 3"	August 26, 2000	6.47
457	4	"Jacksonville, Florida 4"	September 2, 2000	7.32
458	5	"Jacksonville, Florida 5"	September 9, 2000	7.39
459	6	"Jacksonville, Florida 6"	October 14, 2000	8.02
460	7	"Washington State 23"	November 4, 2000	9.18
461	8	"Washington State 24"	November 4, 2000	9.98
462	9	"Washington State 25"	November 11, 2000	9.52
463	10	"Washington State 26"	November 18, 2000	8.47
464	11	"Washington State 27"	November 25, 2000	8.61
465	12	"Jacksonville, Florida 7"	December 2, 2000	7.24
466	13	"Jacksonville, Florida 8"	December 16, 2000	7.85
467	14	"Jacksonville, Florida 9"	January 6, 2001	8.92
468	15	"Jacksonville, Florida 10"	January 13, 2001	9.11
469	16	"Jacksonville, Florida 11"	January 20, 2001	9.52
470	17	"Washington State 28"	January 27, 2001	9.53
471	18	"New Jersey 6"	February 3, 2001	7.88
472	19	"New Jersey 7"	February 10, 2001	7.64
473	20	"New Jersey 8"	February 17, 2001	9.34
474	21	"Caught in the Act Special Edition"	February 21, 2001	N/A
475	22	"New Jersey 9"	February 24, 2001	8.81
476	23	"Dumbest Suspect"	February 26, 2001	10.16
477	24	"Wildest Chases"	February 27, 2001	N/A
478	25	"Animal Encounters"	February 27, 2001	N/A
479	26	"Washington State 29"	March 3, 2001	8.11
480	27	"Washington State 30"	March 10, 2001	8.73
481	28	"Washington State 31"	March 17, 2001	7.68
482	29	"Washington State 32"	March 24, 2001	7.93
483	30	"Washington State 33"	April 7, 2001	7.67
484	31	"Washington State 34"	April 14, 2001	6.18
485	32	"Washington State 35"	April 28, 2001	6.10
486	33	"Arizona 13"	April 28, 2001	7.42
487	34	"Washington State 36"	May 5, 2001	5.94
488	35	"Arizona 14"	May 5, 2001	7.30
489	36	"Washington State 37"	May 12, 2001	5.14
490	37	"Arizona 15"	May 12, 2001	6.64
491	38	"Arizona 16"	May 19, 2001	5.68
492	39	"Mesa, Arizona 17"	May 19, 2001	7.23
493	40	"Mesa, Arizona 18"	July 7, 2001	5.16

=== Season 14 (2001–2002) ===
No. overall	No. in season	Title	Original release date	US viewers (millions)
494	1	"Palm Beach County, Florida 12"	September 1, 2001	6.30
495	2	"Atlanta, Georgia 14"	September 1, 2001	8.34
496	3	"Des Moines, Atlanta, Chattanooga (Coast to Coast 1)"	September 8, 2001	7.01
497	4	"Des Moines, Chattanooga, Atlanta: (Coast to Coast 2)"	September 15, 2001	N/A
498	5	"Atlanta, Chattanooga, Des Moines: (Coast to Coast 3)"	September 22, 2001	5.45
499	6	"Chattanooga, Des Moines, Atlanta: (Coast to Coast 4)"	September 29, 2001	6.48
500	7	"Chattanooga, Desmoines, Atlanta: (Coast to Coast 5)"	October 6, 2001	6.16
501	8	"Des Moines, Chattanooga, Atlanta: (Coast to Coast 6)"	November 10, 2001	7.44
502	9	"Chattanooga, Fort Worth, Des Moines: (Coast to Coast 7)"	November 17, 2001	7.04
503	10	"Atlanta, Chattanooga, Des Moines: (Coast to Coast 8)"	November 24, 2001	7.39
504	11	"Palm Beach County, Florida 13"	December 1, 2001	7.02
505	12	"Fort Worth, Chattanooga, Des Moines: (Coast to Coast 9)"	December 1, 2001	8.50
506	13	"Palm Beach County, Florida 14"	December 15, 2001	7.62
507	14	"Palm Beach County, Florida 15"	January 5, 2002	6.93
508	15	"Coast to Coast 10"	January 12, 2002	6.99
509	16	"Chattanooga, Fort Worth, Des Moines: (Coast to Coast 11)"	January 19, 2002	7.54
510	17	"Coast to Coast 12"	January 26, 2002	7.91
511	18	"Fort Worth, Chattanooga, Des Moines: (Coast to Coast 13)"	February 2, 2002	8.21
512	19	"Coast to Coast 14"	February 9, 2002	6.58
513	20	"Coast to Coast 15"	February 16, 2002	7.27
514	21	"Coast to Coast 16"	February 23, 2002	7.11
515	22	"Coast to Coast 17"	February 23, 2002	8.14
516	23	"Coast to Coast 18"	March 2, 2002	7.94
517	24	"Coast to Coast 19"	March 9, 2002	7.51
518	25	"Coast to Coast 20"	March 16, 2002	7.42
519	26	"Palm Beach County, Florida 16"	March 23, 2002	8.72
520	27	"Coast to Coast 21"	April 6, 2002	6.96
521	28	"Palm Beach County, Florida 17"	April 6, 2002	8.36
522	29	"Palm Beach County, Florida 18"	April 13, 2002	6.87
523	30	"Palm Beach County, Florida 19"	April 20, 2002	6.46
524	31	"Coast to Coast 22"	April 27, 2002	9.79
525	32	"Coast to Coast 23"	April 27, 2002	10.37
526	33	"Naked Cops Special Edition"	April 27, 2002	8.51
527	34	"Too Hot for TV Special Edition"	April 27, 2002	8.51
528	35	"Extreme Cops Special Edition"	September 14, 2002	6.33
529	36	"Coast to Coast 24"	September 21, 2002	6.61

=== Season 15 (2002–2003) ===
No. overall	No. in season	Title	Original release date	US viewers (millions)
530	1	"Coco the Clown"	May 4, 2002	6.76
531	2	"New Orleans, Louisiana: Mardi Gras 2002"	May 18, 2002	5.97
532	3	"New Orleans, Louisiana: Mardi Gras 2002 (Part 2)"	May 18, 2002	7.23
533	4	"Grand Theft Auto 1 Special Edition"	September 14, 2002	7.55
534	5	"Kids in Peril Special Edition"	September 28, 2002	6.46
535	6	"Shots Fired Special Edition"	November 2, 2002	6.50
536	7	"Coast to Coast 25"	November 9, 2002	6.41
537	8	"Coast to Coast 26"	November 16, 2002	7.26
538	9	"Coast to Coast 27"	November 23, 2002	7.69
539	10	"Bad Girls! 1 Special Edition"	November 23, 2002	8.73
540	11	"Coast to Coast 28"	December 7, 2002	7.40
541	12	"Coast to Coast 29"	December 14, 2002	6.90
542	13	"Coast to Coast 30"	January 18, 2003	6.41
543	14	"Coast to Coast 31"	January 25, 2003	7.04
544	15	"Coast to Coast 32"	January 25, 2003	8.90
545	16	"Bad Girls! 2 Special Edition"	February 1, 2003	8.05
546	17	"Domestic Disturbance Special Edition"	February 15, 2003	7.28
547	18	"Stun Gun Special Edition"	February 22, 2003	9.12
548	19	"Coast to Coast 33"	March 8, 2003	7.33
549	20	"Coast to Coast 34"	March 15, 2003	6.94
550	21	"Coast to Coast 35"	March 22, 2003	6.53
551	22	"Coast to Coast 36"	April 12, 2003	5.50
552	23	"Coast to Coast 37"	April 19, 2003	5.92
553	24	"Coast to Coast 38"	April 19, 2003	7.16
554	25	"Coast to Coast 39"	April 26, 2003	5.46
555	26	"Coast to Coast 40"	May 3, 2003	5.41
556	27	"Coast to Coast 41"	May 3, 2003	6.22
557	28	"Guns Special Edition"	May 17, 2003	6.09
558	29	"Drug Enforcement Special Edition"	May 17, 2003	6.63
559	30	"Coast to Coast 42"	July 12, 2003	4.71
560	31	"Coast to Coast 43"	July 19, 2003	5.36
561	32	"Coast to Coast 44"	July 26, 2003	5.16
562	33	"Coast to Coast 45"	August 2, 2003	5.21
563	34	"Coast to Coast 46"	September 20, 2003	5.46
564	35	"Coast to Coast 47"	September 27, 2003	6.28
565	36	"Coast to Coast 48"	November 1, 2003	6.13

=== Season 16 (2003–2004) ===
No. overall	No. in season	Title	Original release date	US viewers (millions)
566	1	"New Orleans, Louisiana: Mardi Gras 2003"	April 26, 2003	6.45
567	2	"Bad Girls! 3 Special Edition"	May 10, 2003	5.85
568	3	"Rescues 1 Special Edition"	September 13, 2003	5.10
569	4	"Rescues 2 Special Edition"	September 13, 2003	5.90
570	5	"Naked Cops 2"	November 1, 2003	6.86
571	6	"Resisting Arrest 1"	November 8, 2003	6.65
572	7	"Jersey Cop Special Edition"	November 15, 2003	6.75
573	8	"Bad Girls! 4 Special Edition"	November 22, 2003	6.43
574	9	"Coast to Coast 49"	December 6, 2003	6.97
575	10	"Coast to Coast 50"	December 13, 2003	6.78
576	11	"Ho! Ho! Ho! 1 Special Edition"	December 20, 2003	5.85
577	12	"Coast to Coast 51"	January 3, 2004	6.02
578	13	"Coast to Coast 52"	January 10, 2004	7.84
579	14	"Coast to Coast 53"	January 17, 2004	6.79
580	15	"Foolish Criminals 2"	January 24, 2004	7.25
581	16	"Coast to Coast 54"	January 31, 2004	7.29
582	17	"War on Drugs 1"	February 7, 2004	7.06
583	18	"War on Drugs 2"	February 7, 2004	7.79
584	19	"Love Hurts Part 1"	February 14, 2004	8.69
585	20	"Love Hurts Part 2"	February 14, 2004	8.69
586	21	"Foolish Criminals 3"	February 21, 2004	7.25
587	22	"Armed & Dangerous Special Edition"	February 28, 2004	7.38
588	23	"Guns & Drugs Special Edition"	February 28, 2004	8.00
589	24	"Coast to Coast 55"	March 6, 2004	6.85
590	25	"Resisting Arrest 2"	March 6, 2004	7.93
591	26	"Coast to Coast 56"	March 13, 2004	7.60
592	27	"Coast to Coast 57"	March 20, 2004	6.31
593	28	"Coast to Coast 58"	April 3, 2004	5.64
594	29	"Coast to Coast 59"	April 10, 2004	5.89
595	30	"Coast to Coast 60"	April 17, 2004	6.44
596	31	"Coast to Coast 61"	April 24, 2004	5.12
597	32	"Best Drug Busts 2 Special Edition"	May 1, 2004	5.94
598	33	"Caught Red Handed: 15 Greatest Takedowns Part 1"	May 1, 2004	6.99
599	34	"Caught Red Handed: 15 Greatest Takedowns Part 2"	May 1, 2004	N/A
600	35	"Hide 'n' Seek Special Edition"	May 8, 2004	5.33
601	36	"Bad Girls! 5 Special Edition"	May 22, 2004	5.50
602	37	"Coast to Coast 62"	July 10, 2004	4.71
603	38	"Coast to Coast 63"	July 17, 2004	5.50
604	39	"Coast to Coast 64"	July 24, 2004	5.39
605	40	"Coast to Coast 65"	July 31, 2004	5.50
606	41	"Coast to Coast 66"	October 2, 2004	5.36

=== Season 17 (2004–2005) ===
No. overall	No. in season	Title	Original release date	US viewers (millions)
607	1	"Mardi Gras 2004 Part 1"	May 15, 2004	4.98
608	2	"Mardi Gras 2004 Part 2"	May 15, 2004	6.02
609	3	"Coast to Coast 67"	September 11, 2004	5.33
610	4	"Coast to Coast 68"	September 11, 2004	6.24
611	5	"Coast to Coast 69"	September 18, 2004	5.36
612	6	"Resisting Arrest 3"	September 25, 2004	5.45
613	7	"Tazed & Confused Special Edition"	November 6, 2004	6.20
614	8	"Grand Theft Auto 2 Special Edition"	November 13, 2004	6.84
615	9	"Bad Girls! 6 Special Edition"	November 20, 2004	7.97
616	10	"Coast to Coast 70"	December 4, 2004	6.79
617	11	"Ho! Ho! Ho! 2 Special Edition"	December 11, 2004	7.32
618	12	"Maui Wowie Special Edition"	January 8, 2005	6.99
619	13	"Got A Habit Special Edition"	January 22, 2005	6.88
620	14	"Busts Special Edition"	January 29, 2005	7.03
621	15	"Resisting Arrest 4"	February 5, 2005	6.28
622	16	"High Crimes 1 Special Edition"	February 5, 2005	7.47
623	17	"Las Vegas Heat 1 Part 1"	February 19, 2005	7.75
624	18	"Las Vegas Heat 1 Part 2"	February 19, 2005	7.75
625	19	"Bad Girls! 7 Special Edition"	February 26, 2005	7.40
626	20	"Coast to Coast 71"	March 5, 2005	6.61
627	21	"Coast to Coast 72"	March 19, 2005	6.15
628	22	"Coast to Coast 73"	March 26, 2005	6.89
629	23	"High Times Special Edition"	April 9, 2005	5.17
630	24	"Coast to Coast 74"	April 16, 2005	5.44
631	25	"600th Milestone Episode"	April 30, 2005	6.41
632	26	"Coast to Coast 75"	April 30, 2005	6.72
633	27	"Coast to Coast 76"	April 30, 2005	7.23
634	28	"Caught in the Act 2 Special Edition"	April 30, 2005	N/A
635	29	"Grand Theft Auto 3 Special Edition"	May 14, 2005	4.64
636	30	"Armed & Dangerous 2 Special Edition"	May 21, 2005	5.44
637	31	"Bizarre Calls Special Edition"	May 21, 2005	6.13
638	32	"Coast to Coast 77"	July 2, 2005	4.02
639	33	"Coast to Coast 78"	July 9, 2005	4.33
640	34	"Coast to Coast 79"	July 16, 2005	4.23
641	35	"Coast to Coast 80"	July 23, 2005	4.86
642	36	"Coast to Coast 81"	August 6, 2005	4.30

=== Season 18 (2005–2006) ===
No. overall	No. in season	Title	Original release date	US viewers (millions)
643	1	"Coast to Coast 82"	September 10, 2005	4.19
644	2	"Coast to Coast 83"	September 10, 2005	5.06
645	3	"Coast to Coast 84"	September 17, 2005	5.46
646	4	"Coast to Coast 85"	September 24, 2005	5.32
647	5	"Coast to Coast 86"	October 1, 2005	5.15
648	6	"Coast to Coast 87"	November 5, 2005	5.31
649	7	"Bad Girls! 8 Special Edition"	November 12, 2005	5.84
650	8	"In Harm's Way Special Edition"	November 19, 2005	6.03
651	9	"Las Vegas Heat 2 Special Edition"	November 26, 2005	6.01
652	10	"Coast to Coast 88"	December 3, 2005	5.88
653	11	"Coast to Coast 89"	December 10, 2005	6.38
654	12	"Ho! Ho! Ho! 3 Special Edition"	December 17, 2005	5.38
655	13	"Coast to Coast 90"	January 7, 2006	5.54
656	14	"Coast to Coast 91"	January 14, 2006	7.43
657	15	"Coast to Coast 92"	January 21, 2006	6.43
658	16	"Coast to Coast 93"	January 28, 2006	6.32
659	17	"Coast to Coast 94"	February 4, 2006	6.46
660	18	"Coast to Coast 95"	February 4, 2006	7.32
661	19	"Las Vegas Heat 3 Special Edition"	February 11, 2006	6.39
662	20	"Coast to Coast 96"	February 25, 2006	6.14
663	21	"Coast to Coast 97"	March 4, 2006	5.84
664	22	"Coast to Coast 98"	March 11, 2006	5.72
665	23	"Coast to Coast 99"	March 18, 2006	6.34
666	24	"Coast to Coast 100"	March 25, 2006	5.56
667	25	"Coast to Coast 101"	April 8, 2006	5.06
668	26	"Coast to Coast 102"	April 15, 2006	4.60
669	27	"Drug Arrests Special Edition"	April 29, 2006	5.60
670	28	"Bad Girls! 9 Special Edition"	May 6, 2006	4.79
671	29	"650th Milestone Episode"	May 20, 2006	4.64
672	30	"Palm Springs Weekend Special Edition"	May 20, 2006	5.62
673	31	"Coast to Coast 103"	June 3, 2006	4.61
674	32	"Coast to Coast 104"	June 10, 2006	4.30
675	33	"Coast to Coast 105"	June 17, 2006	3.97
676	34	"Coast to Coast 106"	July 8, 2006	3.85
677	35	"Coast to Coast 107"	July 15, 2006	3.88
678	36	"Coast to Coast 108"	July 22, 2006	5.23

=== Season 19 (2006–2007) ===
No. overall	No. in season	Title	Original release date	US viewers (millions)
679	1	"Coast to Coast 109"	September 9, 2006	5.28
680	2	"Coast to Coast 110"	September 9, 2006	6.37
681	3	"Coast to Coast 111"	September 16, 2006	5.29
682	4	"Coast to Coast 112"	September 23, 2006	5.61
683	5	"Coast to Coast 113"	September 30, 2006	5.02
684	6	"Drug Arrests 2 Special Edition"	November 4, 2006	5.41
685	7	"Florida Heat 1 Special Edition"	November 11, 2006	5.50
686	8	"Police Chases Special Edition"	November 18, 2006	4.83
687	9	"Bad Girls! 10 Special Edition"	November 25, 2006	6.22
688	10	"Coast to Coast 114"	December 2, 2006	5.50
689	11	"Coast to Coast 115"	December 9, 2006	6.23
690	12	"Ho! Ho! Ho! 4 Special Edition"	December 16, 2006	5.93
691	13	"Coast to Coast 116"	December 23, 2006	4.79
692	14	"Coast to Coast 117"	January 6, 2007	5.49
693	15	"Coast to Coast 118"	January 20, 2007	5.61
694	16	"Coast to Coast 119"	January 27, 2007	5.94
695	17	"Florida Heat 2 Special Edition"	February 3, 2007	6.21
696	18	"Tough Takedowns Special Edition"	February 17, 2007	5.95
697	19	"Liar Liar 1 Special Edition"	February 24, 2007	5.44
698	20	"Coast to Coast 120"	March 3, 2007	5.94
699	21	"Coast to Coast 121"	March 10, 2007	5.71
700	22	"Coast to Coast 122"	March 17, 2007	4.67
701	23	"Coast to Coast 123"	March 24, 2007	4.88
702	24	"Coast to Coast 124"	April 7, 2007	4.98
703	25	"Police Pullovers 1 Special Edition"	April 28, 2007	4.41
704	26	"Police Pullovers 2 Special Edition"	April 28, 2007	5.73
705	27	"High Crimes 2 Special Edition"	May 19, 2007	4.05
706	28	"Ohio Drug Arrests Special Edition"	May 19, 2007	4.72
707	29	"Coast to Coast 125"	June 2, 2007	4.47
708	30	"Coast to Coast 126"	June 9, 2007	3.78
709	31	"Coast to Coast 127"	June 16, 2007	3.63
710	32	"Coast to Coast 128"	June 23, 2007	4.06
711	33	"High Crimes 3 Special Edition"	July 7, 2007	3.89
712	34	"Street Crimes Special Edition"	July 14, 2007	4.67
713	35	"Family Ties 1 Special Edition"	July 21, 2007	4.06
714	36	"Coast to Coast 129"	July 28, 2007	3.90

=== Season 20 (2007–2008) ===
No. overall	No. in season	Title	Original release date	US viewers (millions)
715	1	"Coast to Coast 130"	September 8, 2007	4.42
716	2	"Evidence ... What Evidence? 1"	September 8, 2007	5.78
717	3	"Coast to Coast 131"	September 15, 2007	5.01
718	4	"Coast to Coast 132"	September 22, 2007	4.81
719	5	"20 Years Caught on Tape Part 1"	September 29, 2007	5.87
720	6	"20 Years Caught on Tape Part 2"	September 29, 2007	5.87
721	7	"Coast to Coast 133"	October 6, 2007	5.70
722	8	"Crimes In Progress Special Edition"	November 3, 2007	5.48
723	9	"700th Milestone Episode"	November 10, 2007	5.95
724	10	"Police Pullovers 3 Special Edition"	November 17, 2007	5.91
725	11	"Stupid Criminals 2"	November 24, 2007	6.41
726	12	"Coast to Coast 134"	December 1, 2007	5.39
727	13	"Coast to Coast 135"	December 8, 2007	5.78
728	14	"Family Feuds Special Edition"	December 15, 2007	5.83
729	15	"Coast to Coast 136"	January 19, 2008	5.80
730	16	"Coast to Coast 137"	January 26, 2008	5.58
731	17	"Stupid Behavior 1"	February 2, 2008	5.93
732	18	"Wild Chases Special Edition"	February 2, 2008	6.87
733	19	"Chases and Takedowns Special Edition"	February 16, 2008	5.97
734	20	"Bad Girls! 11 Special Edition"	February 16, 2008	6.67
735	21	"War on Drugs 3"	February 23, 2008	5.92
736	22	"Stupid Criminals 3"	February 23, 2008	6.73
737	23	"Takedowns Special Edition"	March 1, 2008	5.85
738	24	"Coast to Coast 138"	March 8, 2008	6.52
739	25	"Strange Behavior 1"	March 15, 2008	5.85
740	26	"Coast to Coast 139"	March 22, 2008	5.11
741	27	"Coast to Coast 140"	March 29, 2008	5.81
742	28	"In Denial 1 Special Edition"	April 19, 2008	4.57
743	29	"Caught in the Act 3 Special Edition"	April 26, 2008	4.67
744	30	"Stupid Criminals 4"	May 17, 2008	3.94
745	31	"Coast to Coast 141"	May 31, 2008	3.74
746	32	"What Were They Thinking? 1"	June 7, 2008	3.98
747	33	"What Were They Thinking? 2"	June 14, 2008	4.02
748	34	"Stupid Behavior 2"	June 21, 2008	4.12
749	35	"Coast to Coast 142"	July 12, 2008	3.93
750	36	"Coast to Coast 143"	July 19, 2008	3.94
751	37	"Coast to Coast 144"	July 26, 2008	3.95
752	38	"Police Pullovers 4 Special Edition"	August 2, 2008	4.16
