= Debra Weeks =

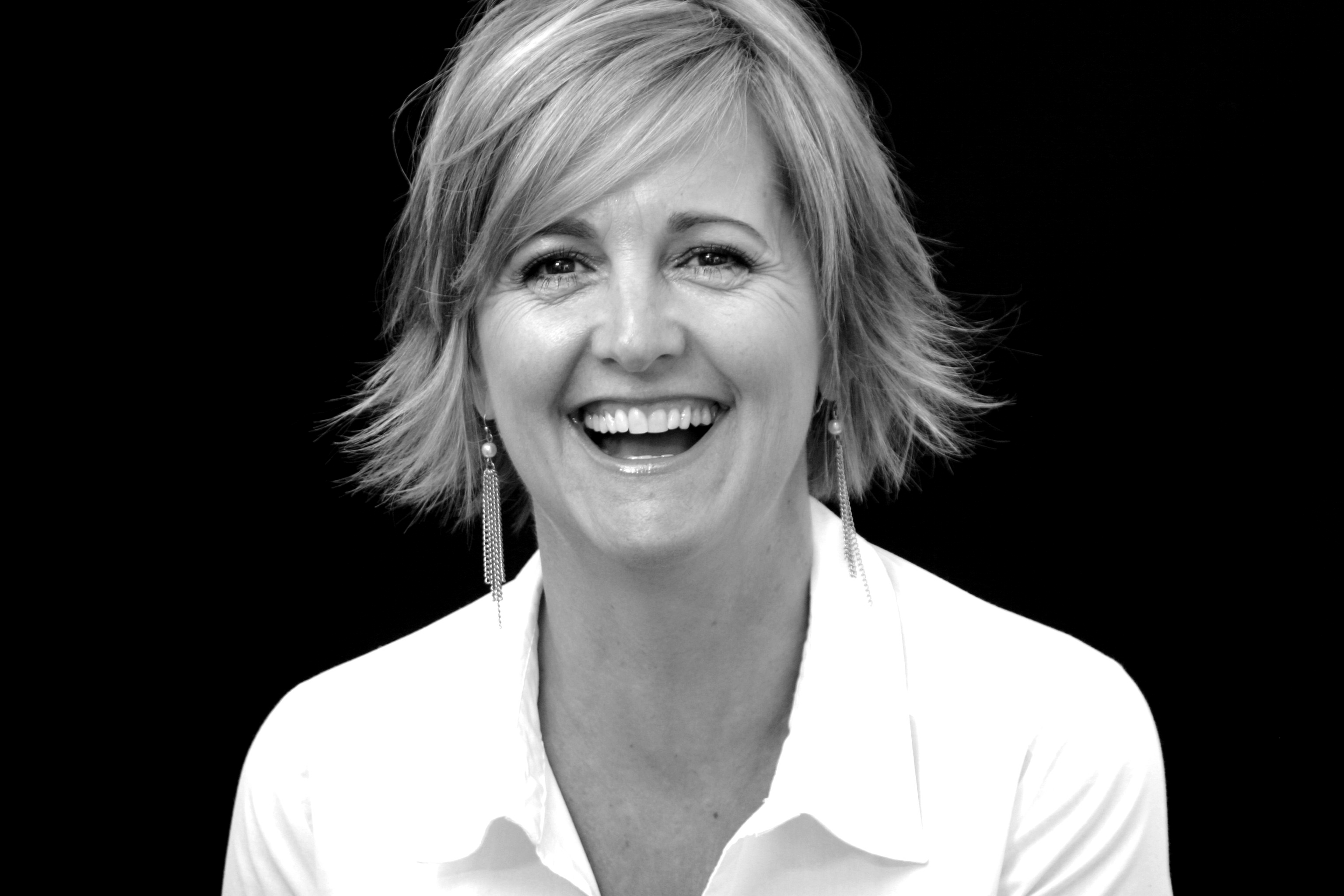
- Occupation: Executive producer/producer journalist
- Years active: 1982–present
- Children: 1
- Website: Debraweeks.com

Debra Weeks is an American television producer, executive producer, director, and journalist. She is noted for her role in the development and direction of reality television.

== Early career ==
Weeks began her career as journalist in 1982 with a degree in Broadcast Journalism from California State University Northridge. She wrote copy and read the news on radio stations in southern California and Nevada. Weeks began in television as a weather girl at KOLO-TV in Reno, NV, and later worked in Texas and New Mexico as a television news reporter, anchor, producer and managing editor.

== Return to Hollywood: Hard Copy ==
Weeks returned to Hollywood as part of the startup team for Paramount Pictures tabloid television magazine series, Hard Copy. She ultimately became the series' Supervising Producer and Managing Editor, working with Peter Brennan and Burt Kearns.

While at Hard Copy, Weeks covered and/or managed the teams reporting on entertainment as well as hard news stories, which included the 1993 child sexual abuse accusations against Michael Jackson, the Waco siege, the Northridge earthquake, the 1992 Los Angeles riots, and the 1993 Big Bayou Canot train wreck.

== Reality television ==
Moving into executive slots, Debra developed and produced multiple reality television projects for network and cable as the surge of reality programming began.

Debra joined with Nash Entertainment, to manage the development and production of NBC's World's Most Amazing Videos.

The Travel Channel's celebrity-driven Road Trip series debuted in 2001 along with the three travel magazine series-Forbidden Places, Destination Danger, and Dangerous Roads.

TLC's World's Best Kept Secrets premiered in 2000. TLC's successful For Better or Worse followed in 2003–2005, beginning the "wedding genre" docudrama.

For Fox in 2003, Weeks executive produced the caught on tape studio audience show Totally Outrageous Behavior, and for Discovery Channel in 2009 with Moments of Impact.

Debra worked with Court TV to rebrand the channel as it transitioned to TruTV by developing and producing the defining reality clip show franchise Most Shocking, debuting in 2006; continuing with Most Daring, Crisis Point, and the countdown show Top 20 Most Shocking. The TruTV reality franchises continued with the comedic cross-genre Clipaholics 2012 and the docu-soap Caught Red Handed, also in 2012.

== Network and digital landscape evolution ==
In April 2012, AXS TV, the newly formed partnership between HDNet, Ryan Seacrest, Anschutz Entertainment Group (AEG), and CAA tapped Debra Weeks as Executive Producer to develop and launch its live entertainment programming block, "AXSLive".

The successful launch of the new programming block was described as "the pop-culture equivalent of ESPN's SportsCenter" and premiered in July 2012 on the newly rebranded AXS TV network.

In 2014, Weeks joined Sean Combs' new Revolt channel as a network Executive Producer.

== Sources ==
- Debra Weeks webradio interview
- Fox News interview on Most Daring series
- The Hollywood Reporter: Mark Cuban-Ryan Seacrest Channel Taps 'Hard Copy' Producer to Run Daily Live Show
