= Nathaniel White =

American serial killer

- Born: July 28, 1960 (age 66)
- Conviction: Second degree murder (6 counts)
- Penalty: 150 years to life imprisonment

Details
- Victims: 6
- Span of crimes: March 25, 1991 – July 30, 1992
- Country: United States
- State: New York
- Date apprehended: August 2, 1992

Nathaniel White (born July 28, 1960) is an American serial killer. Active in the Hudson Valley region, in and near Orange County, New York, during the early 1990s, White confessed to beating and stabbing six women to death while on parole.

Raised in Poughkeepsie, New York, as a teen, he graduated from Poughkeepsie High School in 1979 and later served a brief stint in the US Army from 1980 to 1983. He was residing in the Town of Wallkill, just outside of Middletown, New York, during his 16-month murder spree.

== Killings ==
White claimed to have found inspiration for his first murder while watching RoboCop 2: "The first girl I killed was from a 'RoboCop' movie... I seen him cut somebody's throat then take the knife and slit down the chest to the stomach and left the body in a certain position. With the first person I killed I did exactly what I saw in the movie."

This first killing took place on March 25, 1991—after White had been convicted of abducting a 16-year-old girl, but before he started his prison sentence—and police did not make the connection at the time. In a plea bargain that would later be heavily criticized, White had pleaded guilty to a misdemeanor for the abduction and would therefore be eligible for parole after just one year.

White was paroled in April 1992 and returned to Orange County, New York. White's first victim after his parole was the young niece of his girlfriend, whom he killed at the end of June. He then killed four others in July 1992.

== Victims ==
=== Juliana R. Frank ===
White's first victim was Juliana Frank, 29, of Middletown, who was pregnant with her third child when she was killed on March 25, 1991. Her naked body was left on a set of abandoned railroad tracks in Middletown.

=== Christine M. Klebbe ===
White's youngest victim was Christine Klebbe, 14, who had just finished eighth grade. The niece of White's girlfriend, Jill Garrison, Klebbe disappeared on June 1. Her family reported her missing on July 1, 1992, and her body was discovered off of Echo Lake Road in Goshen, New York, on August 4.

=== Laurette Huggins Reviere ===
Laurette Huggins Reviere, 34 of Middletown, was killed July 10 and found in her home in Middletown by the police. She was a mother of three children and a close friend of White's girlfriend. Her children even slept over at White and Garrison's house a few weeks before her murder. She was in the midst of packing to go back to her home country of St. Vincent and the Grenadines with her family when she was murdered.

=== Angelina Hopkins and Brenda L. Whiteside ===
Cousins Angelina Hopkins and Brenda Whiteside met White at the Blue Note Tavern in Poughkeepsie, New York, on July 20, 1992. They were last seen leaving the bar with him in his pickup truck. Their bodies were found in a wooded area off of Harriman Drive near an abandoned farmhouse in Goshen on August 4. Cause of death in both cases was determined to be severe blunt trauma to the face and head.

=== Adriane M. Hunter ===
Adriane Hunter of Middletown was stabbed to death in the early morning July 30, 1992. Her body was discovered in Goshen later that day, near the charred remains of the Hillcrest Manor Restaurant. She was 27. She left behind two daughters.

== Investigation ==
The bodies of Hopkins and Whiteside were discovered near this house abandoned on Harriman Drive in Goshen on August 4. The body of Adriane Hunter had been found nearby a few days earlier. The house (along with the barn) are no longer standing.

Angelina Hopkins's sister, Cecilia, witnessed Hopkins and Whiteside leaving the Blue Note Tavern with four men on the night of their disappearance. Poughkeepsie police did not act on the missing person report as they did not have enough information about the men, so Cecilia and her mother continued investigating on their own.

The New York State Police began investigating on July 30, after the body of Adriane Hunter was found and authorities began to suspect it was related to the earlier disappearances and murders. On August 2, White returned to the Blue Note where Hopkins identified him and he was arrested. White confessed and led police to his dumping ground in Goshen on August 4.

White was indicted by a grand jury on August 7 for the murder of Christine Klebbe. On September 9, the other five murders were added to the indictment. White was charged with six counts of second degree murder and pleaded not guilty by reason of insanity, he was defended by Bernard Brady of Goshen, New York. White was convicted on all counts on April 14, 1993, and sentenced by Judge Jeffrey Berry to 150 years to life. He is currently held at Elmira Correctional Facility.

White's case was cited by New York governor George Pataki in defense of his push to reinstate the death penalty.

== Television ==
- White's crimes were profiled in a 1999 episode of A&E's program Investigative Reports titled "Copycat Crimes".
- In 2012 Investigation Discovery show Evil, I made an episode about the case (S01E08 - Midnight Prowler)
- The Investigation Discovery channel broadcast an episode called 'I Invited Him In’ featuring the Nathaniel White case for the Evil Lives Here series in August 2018. It used the picture of another Nathaniel White, an African-American resident of Florida, who sued the TV station for defamation. His picture had also been used in the Wikipedia article on the serial killer.
- The Reelz channel broadcast S2 E5 of the series CopyCat Killers titled 'Robocop' tying Nathaniel White's killings to the RoboCop franchise.
- In 2022 Oxygen Network series Twisted Killers made an episode about the investigation (S01E03 - Overkilled).

== See also ==
- List of serial killers in the United States
