= J. Buzz Von Ornsteiner =

American TV forensic psychologist (born 1967)

Dr. J. Buzz Von Ornsteiner
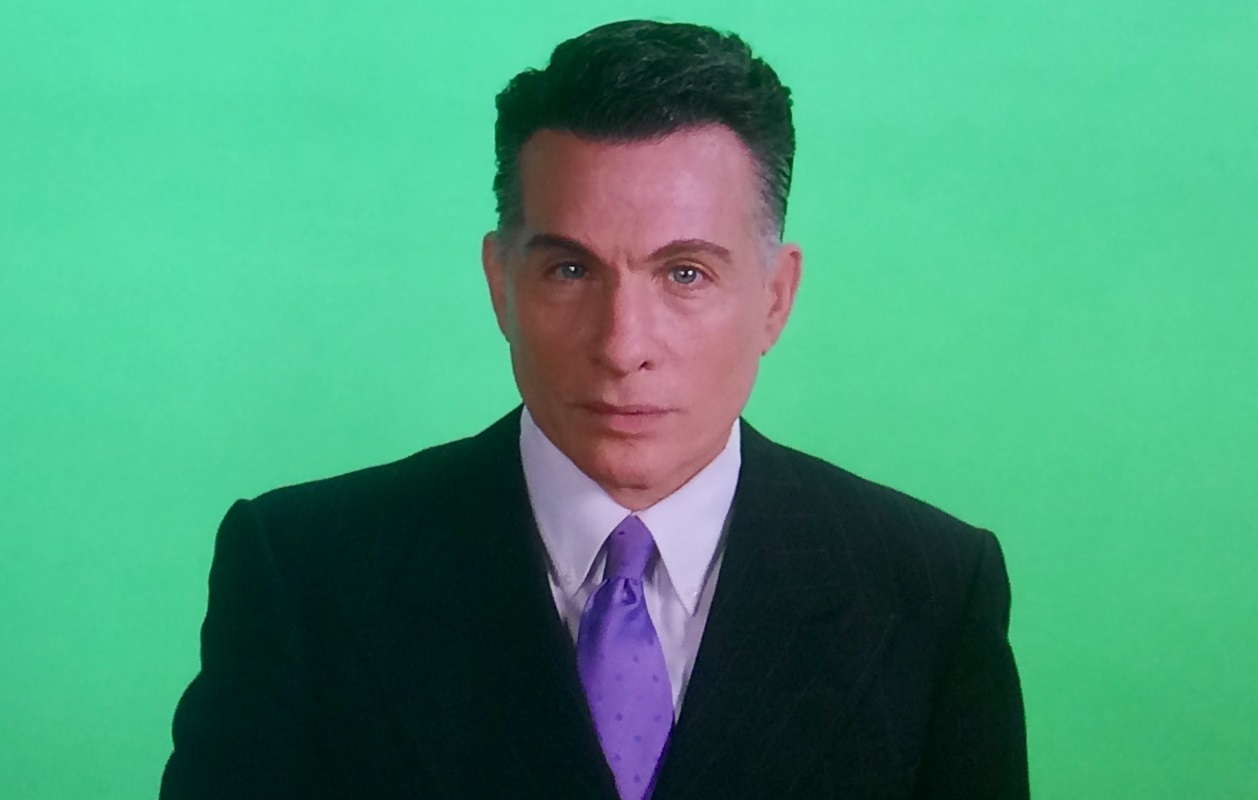
- Born: August 20, 1967 (age 58); Reno, Nevada, United States
- Other name: Dr. Buzz
- Education: B.A., State University of New York at Purchase; M.A., New York University; M.S., Hunter College; Ed.S., City College; SSP, City College, M.A., Craig Newmark Graduate School of Journalism at the City University of New York; Ph.D, Indiana State University
- Occupations: Psychologist & Television Analyst
- Employer: NYPD

Dr. J. Buzz Von Ornsteiner (born August 20, 1967) a.k.a. Dr. Buzz is a licensed forensic psychologist who provided commentary for the TV series CopyCat Killers.

== Career ==
Von Ornsteiner is a licensed psychologist and has a history working with the mentally ill within the context of the legal system. From 2012 till 2019 he was the project director for the Mental Health Court Advocacy Program which was based in Brooklyn Arraignment Court. The program, which ended when the city's new bail reform law came into effect, was created to divert from further adjudication and confinement, seriously and persistently mentally ill offenders charged with minor, low-level non-violent crimes at the first point of contact within Criminal Court, at Brooklyn Arraignment Court. In addition, Von Ornsteiner also was the project director for EAC NETWORK's Forensic Intensive Case Management Program, which provided intensive case management services for severely mentally ill males recently released from New York State prisons. Transitional services included placement within the New York City homeless shelter system. In 2021, Von Ornsteiner began working within the Health and Wellness section of the NYPD

Before receiving his doctoral degree, Von Ornsteiner also appeared as a lead actor in several feature films during the late 1980s: Robot Holocaust, Slash Dance and Zombie Death House.

Von Ornsteiner became known to the public as "Dr. Buzz", appearing first on New York City radio station WWRL with his own show, Ask Dr. Buzz, and then on national cable stations, CNN International, CNN Headline News, Fox News, E Entertainment, MSNBC, WNYW, Court TV News, Tru TV, WPIX, Investigation Discovery and Reelz as a regular expert analyst commenting on current high-profile criminal cases.

== Selected Television credits ==
Year	Title	Network	Notes
2006–2009	Lisa Bloom: Open Court	Court TV	32 Episodes
2006–2009	Jami Floyd: Best Defense	Court TV	50 Episodes
2014	The Killer Speaks	A&E	1 Episode
2015–2016	Evil Kin	Investigation Discovery	5 Episodes
2016	Deadly Demands	Investigation Discovery	1 Episode
2016–2020	CopyCat Killers	Reelz	45 Episodes

== Selected Radio appearances ==
Year	Program	Station
2003-2005	Ask Dr. Buzz	WWRL
