= Haunted Lives: True Ghost Stories =

- Also known as: Real Ghosts (1995)
- Genre: Paranormal; Anthology
- Starring: Leonard Nimoy (1991); Stacy Keach (1992–1995)
- Country of origin: United States
- Original language: English
- No. of episodes: 3

Production
- Running time: 46 minutes

Original release
- Network: CBS (1991-1992); UPN (1995)
- Release: May 15, 1991 – November 28, 1995

Related
- Unsolved Mysteries; Sightings; A Haunting

Haunted Lives: True Ghost Stories (shortened to Haunted Lives and later re-titled as Real Ghosts) was an American paranormal anthology television miniseries that originally broadcast from May 15, 1991 to November 28, 1995, on CBS and UPN. This short-lived program comprised three primetime specials that featured re-enactments of ghost stories told by real people who experienced alleged paranormal activity. The docudrama series used actors and special effects, and then introduced the witnesses who reported such phenomena.

The series was developed for television by Bruce Nash and Allan Zullo, authors of the popular book series, Haunted Kids: True Ghost Stories.

== Format ==
Each segment follows reenactments of events with the characters narrating. At the end of each re-creation, the real witnesses involved appear and give their account of the events, including more recent activity. These portions were usually filmed at or near the location in question. In the Episode 2 story "Terror For Rent", the actual witnesses appeared in silhouette to conceal their true identities.

The first two specials were called Haunted Lives, and the third and final special was renamed to Real Ghosts. All have been narrated by Leonard Nimoy and Stacy Keach.

== Episode guide ==
No.	Title	Directed by	Written by	Original release date	Ratings
1	"Ghosts R Us/Legend of Kate Morgan/School Spirit"	Tobe Hooper	David Braff, Al Katz, Gilbert Adler, Peter M. Lenkov	May 15, 1991	10.1
In Sunnyvale, California, Toys R Us employees are disturbed by the ghost of Yonny Yohnson. In San Diego, California, an attorney investigates the ghost of murdered Kate Morgan at the Hotel del Coronado. In Austin, Texas, the spirits of school children terrorize the crew demolishing the Metz Elementary School.
2	"Unfinished Business/Motel Hell/Terror For Rent"	Charles Braverman	Lee Goldberg, William Rabkin, Morgan Gendel	September 23, 1992	11
In Double Oak, Texas, the ghost of a hot-tempered and obstinate father returns begging for forgiveness. In Van Nuys, California, a loving couple are driven to the brink of killing each other in their new dream home. In Madison, Indiana, a family is haunted by the ghost of a young girl who died in a former motel.
3	"The Brotherhood/Ghost Watch/The Headless Ghost"	Michael Levine	Erik Nelson	November 28, 1995	3.5
In Manhattan, Kansas, a college freshman at Kansas State University is protected by the ghost of a former fraternity member killed in a hazing incident. In a new "Ghost Watch" segment, testimonies are included from witnesses who have experienced real ghosts. In Wilder, Kentucky, the story of the hauntings at Bobby Mackey's Music World.

== Episode Breakdown ==
=== Episode 1 (a.k.a. Real Ghosts II) ===
Original air date: Wednesday, May 15, 1991, CBS

Episode 1 consists of three segments, all directed by Tobe Hooper, known for Poltergeist and The Texas Chain Saw Massacre: and edited by Jonathan Moser who also created the special effects in the show.

1. "Ghosts R Us"

A female stockperson in Toys R Us in Sunnyvale, California is frightened from her job in the storeroom. Her supervisor doesn't know what to make of it until her other employees tell their stories. Two of the employees discover the ghost could be Yonny Yonson, a working immigrant who died when the property was still the Old Murphy Ranch. Yonny was in love with the daughter of his boss, but she rejected him. He died in an accident with an axe while chopping wood. Unsure what to do, the Toys R Us employees call in renowned psychic Sylvia Browne, who tries to send Yonny's spirit to the light, but it's quite obvious he won't leave.

2. "The Legend of Kate Morgan"

Attorney Alan May investigates the ghost of Kate Morgan at Hotel del Coronado in San Diego, California. When he discovers he has the wrong room because the rooms were renumbered in the past, he tracks down Kate's real room and encounters her spirit and lives through a place memory of her murder. Through research, he discovers Kate's real name was Lottie Bernard and her son might have been his own ancestor.

3. "School Spirit"

In Austin, Texas, men tearing down an old school are scared by voices and images of young ghost as well as experience equipment problems. The foreman is losing time and money so he gets a psychic to deal with the problem and things seem to get better. One of the workmen starts getting a feeling that the ghosts are back but is ordered back to work. When a wall falls the wrong way, he gets killed. The foreman vows to destroy the school, but they never completely go away. When he reburies a tree from the Metz Elementary site in his daughter's yard, his son-in-law reports hearing the sounds of happy children coming from it.

Cast & Crew

Narrator: Leonard Nimoy

Writer: David Braff, Al Katz, Gilbert Adler, Peter M. Lenkov
Director: Tobe Hooper
Editor: Jonathan Moser
Show Stars: Leonard Nimoy (Narrator), Guest Stars: Kent Burden (Joe Torres), Sarah Carson (Kate Morgan a.k.a. Lottie Bernard), Hector Elias (Morris Torres), John Hammil (Yonny Yonson (ghost)), Shawn Kristy (Elizabeth Murphy), Eileen Jo Bowman (Store Clerk), Eli Guralnick (Store Manager), Juan Garcia (Otto), Del Zamora (Gabe Torres), Robert Jacobs (Tom Morgan), Van Williams (Mr. Fitzgerald), Alvin Silver (Alan May)

Notes: The Toys R Us ghost was also featured on the TV series That's Incredible and Ripley's Believe it or Not!. Each show featured photos of the ghost from the 1978 seance. Hotel del Coronado featured in this episode has also been featured in the Haunted Hotels series on Travel Channel as well as the special, Ghosts: Caught On Tape.

Quotes:

Manager: "How do I get rid of him?"
Margie: (sarcastically underbreath) "With a silver bullet?"
Otto: (frightened of the ghosts) "I can't go back. I got a feeling if I do, something bad is going to happen."
Joe Torres: "Yeah? Well, if you don't go back in, something worse will happen to you. You'll be fired."
School Ghosts: "Ashes, ashes, we all fall down!" (The ghosts chant this in Otto's ear before a wall collapses on him.)
School Ghosts: "Are you still here, man?" (Otto discovers this message written on a chalkboard for him in an empty and deserted classroom after looking for the kids supposedly making noises.)
Gabe Torres: "Didn't you have a childhood, man. Scary buildings are great. You can play hide and seek, go treasure hunting or look for dead bodies or ghosts...." (to Otto after hearing children's voices giggling)

Trivia: Renowned psychic Sylvia Browne portrays herself in one of the recreations. She has often appeared on The Montel Williams Show.

Allusions: Joe Torres: "What do you want me to do? Call Ghostbusters?!" Joe says this to his sons who work for him. He is referring to the 1984 movie which starred Dan Aykroyd, Bill Murray and Sigourney Weaver.
Margie: "I can see him. He looks like Casper." Margie says this while Sylvia is trying to get the ghost of Yonni Yonson to appear. This is an allusion to the popular cartoon series Casper the Ghost, which later became a motion picture.

=== Episode 2 (a.k.a. Real Ghosts III) ===
Original air date: Wednesday, September 23, 1992, CBS

Episode 2 consists of three segments:

1. "Unfinished Business"

In Double Oak, Texas, domineering Bob Clanton rules his family with an iron fist. He harshly critiques his sons and constantly tests their patience. Bob dies in a motorcycle accident; as Bob is being buried, his family notices his corpse suddenly open its eyes. Soon, Bob's ghost is back to haunt the family, but a psychic explains he is just seeking forgiveness.

2. "Terror For Rent"

In Van Nuys, California, a young couple buys the house of their dreams. Soon, the couple devolves into arguments that nearly turn violent, but the husband drags his wife out of the house upon seeing a ghost. Actual video footage from the real location shows purported poltergeist activity.

3. "Motel Hell"

Doretta Johnson buys a former hotel near Madison, Indiana to convert into a family business. After moving in, birds fly into the house and are later found dead. The ghost of a little girl is seen in the bathtub where she was killed, and a childlike voice echoes through the place at night. When the hauntings become threatening, the family wants to leave, but they can't afford it.

Cast & Crew

Narrator: Stacy Keach
Writer: Lee Goldberg, William Rabkin, Morgan Gendel
Director: Charles Braverman
Show Stars: Stacy Keach (Narrator), Guest Stars: Eileen Jo Bowman (Female Clerk), Eli Guralnick (Store Manager), Peter DeLuise (Kyle Matheson), Jeri Gaile (Rita Matheson), Steven Barr (Ron Johnson), Marianne Muellerleile (Seance Medium), Joe Colligan (Rick Clanton), Carl Ciarfalio (Union Official), Bart Braverman (Priest), Jared Rushton (Steve Johnson), J. P. Bumstead (Bob Clanton), Doren Fein (Ashley Johnson), David Kaufman (Tim Clanton), Kyle Buckley (Realtor), Laura Waterbury (Doretta Johnson)

=== Episode 3 (a.k.a. Real Ghosts) ===
Original air date: Tuesday, November 28, 1995, UPN

Episode 3 (Real Ghosts) consists of two stories and a new "Ghost Watch" segment:

1. "The Brotherhood"

A college freshman at Kansas State University in Manhattan, Kansas is protected by the ghost of a prior fraternity member killed in a hazing incident at Phi Beta Delta Fraternity. Among his future brothers, Josh Pickering also meets the ghost of Duncan who protects all new pledges and terrorizes the fraternity's brothers. Josh discovers the story about Duncan after an old alumni member named Wally Marshall who had covered up the truth of Duncan's death dies in the fraternity house. After Duncan warns Josh and the fraternity of a fire, Josh decides to lay Duncan's spirit to rest by making him a part of the fraternity.

2. "Ghost Watch"

This new segment rapidly features three mini-stories, told by the people who witnessed them. In Somers, Connecticut, the McCauley family are terrorized by a malevolent spirit that focuses its demonic attention on the children. In North Arlington, New Jersey, the Yuelling family is terrorized by their murdered daughter and her killer. In Atwater, California, The Castle Air Museum displays a ghost B-29 bomber, piloted by a friendly ghost named Arthur.

3. "The Headless Ghost"

The story of the hauntings at Bobby Mackey's Music World in Wilder, Kentucky. His pregnant wife is constantly spooked and is nearly attacked even as employee Carl warns Bobby the place is not right. A psychic detects a well under the foundation and a patron is attacked by a presence in the toilet. Bobby still isn't sure what to make of the haunting, but he loves the publicity they bring to the place.

Cast & Crew

Narrator: Stacy Keach
Writer: Erik Nelson
Director: Michael Levine
Show Stars: Stacy Keach (Narrator), Guest stars: Christopher Daniel Barnes (Josh Pickering), Michael Bowen (Bobby Mackey), Charlene Tilton (Vicki the Bartender), Johnathan Chapin (Alonzo Walling (ghost)), James Walch (The Judge), Khrystyne Haje (Pearl Bryan (ghost)), John Hillard (Richard Lawson), Seth Green (Termite), Brian McGrail (Lewis), Ron Carlson (Duncan (The Fraternity Ghost), Elaine Orth (Cheerleader), Allen Cutler (Robed Man), F. William Parker (Wally Marshall), Sheena Easton (Janet Mackey), Rugg Williams (Mike), Linda Cook (Patricia Mischel), Edward Winter (Carl Lawson)

Notes: Bobby Mackey's Music World has also been explored by the TV series Encounters, Sightings, Unsolved Mysteries, A Haunting, Is It Real? and Ghost Adventures. Run on the UPN in November 1995, the series was now called Real Ghosts. The opening narration was slightly altered, a middle story was dropped and the series started using more recognizable actors, but it was not picked up as a regular series. Edward Winter, who plays Carl Lawson in the "Headless Ghost" storyline, was actually credited as Ed Winter. Winter is best known for playing Colonel Flagg in the TV series M*A*S*H.

Quotes:

Vicki: "Come on, sugar, drink up. I'm buying tonight."
Richard: "Hey, if anyone can drive a man to drink, it's you."
Bobby: (his foot goes through floor) "No wonder this place is so cheap."
Carl: (foreshadowing) "That ain't the only reason."
Bobby: (to Janet) "Nothing up here bites."
Carl: (foreshadowing again) "Nothing much."

Trivia: Manhattan, Kansas, the location of the haunted Phi Beta Delta fraternity at Kansas State University, is also the hometown of Cassandra Peterson, a.k.a. Elvira, Mistress of the Dark.

Allusions: Josh's opening narration: "Ever since I saw the movie Animal House, I thought it would be a blast to live in a fraternity." Josh is alluding to the 1975 movie Animal House. Mike and Josh hear noises in the library when they stay the night. Mike: "Phasers on stun." Josh: "Aye, captain." Their sayings are oriented to the classic Star Trek series.

== Broadcast history ==
- CBS originally aired the first two primetime specials in 1991 and 1992.
- UPN concurrently aired the final special in 1995.
- UPN's later airings included all three specials, now permanently renamed to Real Ghosts in 1996. Real Ghosts II premiered January 23, 1996 and Real Ghosts III premiered February 13, 1996.
- Syfy aired the specials in syndication until the early 2000s (known as The Sci Fi Channel at the time).
- Syfy later aired another paranormal special in the 2003, California's Most Haunted which recycled some Haunted Lives visuals for its opening sequence.
- Hulu made the series available for online streaming in October 2012 (USA only), known by the rebroadcast name Real Ghosts.
- International markets also aired an alternate version of Episode 1. The international version contained extended scenes, alternate music and a longer running time. This version was also released on the international home video market and remains the only episode available on home video, via Region 2 import.

== Releases ==
Copies of Episode 1 have been released on VHS and Region 2 PAL DVD in Germany, known as, Real Ghost: Die Geister unter uns, translated to Real Ghost: The Ghosts Among Us. A new Region 1 DVD set featuring all 3 episodes is currently available for pre-order at Amazon.ca.

=== Region 1 releases ===
Name	Release date	Episode	Region	Additional information
Great British Ghosts: Season 1	May 27, 2014	1-3	1	All 3 episodes available as a bonus feature on 2nd disc.
Real Ghost, Haunted Lives, True Ghost Stories	April 29, 2016	1-3	1	All 3 episodes available in a one-disc set. Bonus features TBA.

=== Region 2 releases ===
Name	Release date	Episode	Region	Additional information
Real Ghost	May 1, 1999	1	2	VHS release of Episode 1.
Real Ghost - The Ghosts Among Us	October 12, 2005	1	2	DVD release of Episode 1. Contains no bonus features.
Ghost Stories - The Ghosts Among Us	April 5, 2006	1	2	DVD release of Episode 1 and Totem bonus feature film.
Living Nightmare / Real Ghost	April 1, 2008	1	2	DVD release of Episode 1 and Night Terrors bonus feature film (Also directed by Tobe Hooper.)
Real Ghost - The Ghosts Among Us	July 14, 2011	1	2	2005 DVD re-release of Episode 1. Bonus features include a screenshot slideshow and trailer for Survival on the Mountain.

== See also ==
- Haunted Kids: True Ghost Stories
