= Who Wants to Marry My Dad? =

2003 reality television series

- Genre: Reality television
- Country of origin: United States
- Original language: English
- No. of seasons: 2
- No. of episodes: 12

Production
- Executive producers: Bruce Nash; Scott Satin
- Production companies: Nash Entertainment; NBC Studios

Original release
- Network: NBC
- Release: July 14, 2003 – August 2, 2004

Who Wants To Marry My Dad is an NBC-produced reality show that aired in the summer of 2003 and 2004. The show featured children who would choose a woman for their father to marry. The show was a modest hit in ratings and returned for season two in 2004. The show was cancelled soon after ratings decreased compared to season one.
