= TruTV's Top Funniest =

American reality comedy television series

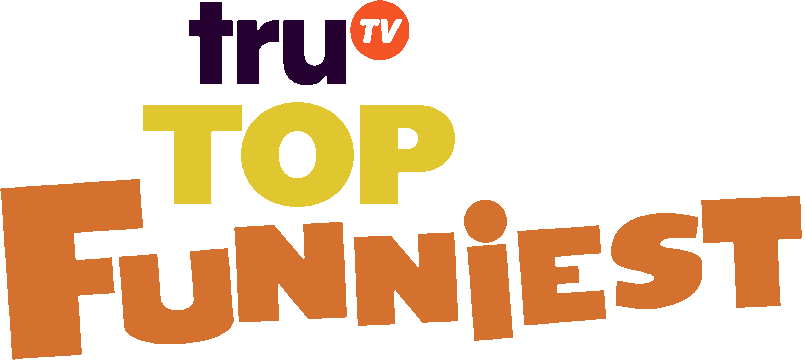
- Also known as: Top 20 Funniest
- Genre: Clip show Comedy
- Narrated by: Mocean Melvin (2013–2014); Charlie Schlatter (2015)
- Country of origin: United States
- Original language: English
- No. of seasons: 3
- No. of episodes: 60

Production
- Executive producers: Bruce Nash; Andrew Jebb; Matt Harris
- Running time: 60 minutes (seasons 1–2); 30 minutes (season 3)
- Production company: Nash Entertainment

Original release
- Network: TruTV
- Release: May 23, 2013 – August 11, 2015

TruTV's Top Funniest (named Top 20 Funniest for its first season) is an American reality comedy television series broadcast on TruTV from May 23, 2013 to August 11, 2015. The series presented a compilation of comical video clips, often depicting accidents or mishaps from around the world. It was narrated by Mocean Melvin for the first two seasons, with Charlie Schlatter narrating the third season.

The first season featured themed episodes such as "What Was I Thinking?" and "Fantastic Failures", with a countdown format highlighting 20 videos in each episode. In the second season, the countdown was removed, and clips were grouped into categories displayed in an on-screen sidebar. The third season discontinued the sidebar but retained the category-based format.

On March 12, 2015, TruTV renewed the series for a third season consisting of 22 episodes, which premiered on May 5, 2015.

== Episodes ==
Season	Episodes	Originally aired (U.S. dates)	
Season	Episodes	Season premiere	Season finale
1	18	May 23, 2013	December 29, 2013
2	20	April 29, 2014	October 2, 2014
3	22	May 5, 2015	August 11, 2015

=== Season 1 (2013) ===
No. in Series	No. in Season	Title	Original air date	Production code
1	1	"Worst Days Ever"	May 23, 2013	101
2	2	"Wrong Turns"	May 30, 2013	102
3	3	"Hurts So Good"	June 6, 2013	103
4	4	"What Was I Thinking?"	June 13, 2013	104
5	5	"How Did That Happen?!?"	June 20, 2013	105
6	6	"Missteps & Mistakes"	June 27, 2013	106
7	7	"Hits & Misses"	July 11, 2013	107
8	8	"TV Blunders"	July 18, 2013	108
9	9	"Mistakes & Mishaps"	October 27, 2013	109
10	10	"Unforgettable Moments"	November 3, 2013	110
11	11	"Awkward Moments"	November 10, 2013	111
12	12	"TV Blunders 2"	November 17, 2013	114
13	13	"Big Time Blunders"	November 24, 2013	112
14	14	"Fantastic Failures"	December 1, 2013	113
15	15	"Greatest Gaffes"	December 8, 2013	115
16	16	"TV Blunders 3"	December 15, 2013	116
17	17	"Bad Ideas"	December 22, 2013	117
18	18	"TV Blunders 4"	December 29, 2013	118

=== Season 2 (2014) ===
No. in Series	No. in Season	Title	Original air date	Production code
19	1	"Funny Fails"	April 29, 2014	201
20	2	"Side Splitters"	May 6, 2014	202
21	3	"Hilarious Moments"	May 13, 2014	203
22	4	"Ridiculous Antics"	May 20, 2014	204
23	5	"Silly Blunders"	May 27, 2014	205
24	6	"Surprise Laughs"	June 3, 2014	206
25	7	"Moments of Regret"	June 10, 2014	207
26	8	"Outrageous Surprises"	June 17, 2014	208
27	9	"Epic Fails"	June 22, 2014	209
28	10	"Comical Escapades"	June 29, 2014	210
29	11	"Frolics and Follies"	August 14, 2014	212
30	12	"Outrageous Antics"	August 21, 2014	211
31	13	"Boneheaded Blunders"	August 28, 2014	213
32	14	"Funny Fails 2"	September 4, 2014	214
33	15	"Big Time Blunders"	September 4, 2014	215
34	16	"Giggles and Gaffes"	September 11, 2014	216
35	17	"Funky Chuckles"	September 11, 2014	217
36	18	"Goofballs"	September 18, 2014	218
37	19	"Best Days Ever"	September 25, 2014	219
38	20	"Happy Fun Times"	October 2, 2014	220

=== Season 3 (2015) ===
No. in Series	No. in Season	Title	Original air date	Production code
39	1	"Goofs and Gaffes"	May 5, 2015	301
40	2	"Grins and Giggles"	May 5, 2015	302
41	3	"Worst Days Ever 2"	May 12, 2015	303
42	4	"Ridiculous Moments"	May 12, 2015	304
43	5	"Hilarious Antics"	May 19, 2015	305
44	6	"Outrageous Laughs"	May 19, 2015	306
45	7	"Big Time Blunders"	May 26, 2015	307
46	8	"Silly Surprises"	May 26, 2015	308
47	9	"Viral Vidiots"	June 2, 2015	309
48	10	"Fails, Falls and Follies"	June 2, 2015	310
49	11	"Masters of Disasters"	June 9, 2015	311
50	12	"Silly Behavior"	June 9, 2015	312
51	13	"Fantastic Fails"	June 16, 2015	313
52	14	"Laugh Riot"	June 16, 2015	314
53	15	"Fools on Parade"	June 23, 2015	315
54	16	"World Wide Whackos"	June 30, 2015	316
55	17	"Pranks and Funny Fails"	July 7, 2015	317
56	18	"Comical Fools"	July 14, 2015	318
57	19	"Bungling Boneheads"	July 21, 2015	319
58	20	"Show Me the Funny"	July 28, 2015	320
59	21	"You've Got Fail"	August 4, 2015	321
60	22	"All Flubbed Up"	August 11, 2015	322
