= Haunted Kids =

Series of children's true ghost story books

- Author: Allan Zullo; Bruce Nash
- Country: United States
- Language: English
- Genre: non-fiction, Children's
- Publisher: Troll; Scholastic
- Published: 1993-1997

Haunted Kids (also known as Haunted Kids: True Ghost Stories) is a series of children's allegedly true ghost story books written by Allan Zullo and Bruce Nash. The stories are all non-fiction and based on alleged real cases, involving children who claim to have had encounters with the supernatural. The series published 11 initial volumes between 1993 and 1997.

== Overview ==
Starting in the 2000s, the series was republished by Scholastic. The first volume in the series was released on audiobook in 2006, narrated by John Ratzenberger. The series spawned several spin-offs, all involving haunted locations, written by Allan Zullo. A box-set was released in 2008, containing six volumes from the book series and a skull pendant.

== Haunted Kids series ==
#	Title	Author	Original published date	Pages	ISBN
1	Haunted Kids: True Ghost Stories	Allan Zullo	July 1, 1993	91	0-816-73266-3
Contains eleven stories: The Devil's Garden; Grave Consequences; The Headless Trainman; The Secret of Room 333; The Home Wrecker; The Ghost of Slow Sam; The Baby-Sitting Ghost; The Scaredy Cats; The Thing in the Attic; The Warning; The Glowing Ball of Death.
2	Spooky Kids: Strange but True Tales	Allan Zullo, Bruce Nash	September 1, 1994	118	0-816-73447-X
AKA More Haunted Kids. Contains ten stories: The Fine Line; The Mystery of Willie Baker; The Coin Reader; Blackjack's Rescue; Deadly Dreams; Dead Again; The Train of Doom; The Maple Tree Murders; Amy's Hunch; The Mysterious Colors.
3	Totally Haunted Kids: True Ghost Stories	Allan Zullo, Bruce Nash	September 28, 1994	126	0-816-73538-7
Contains nine stories: The Family Secret; The Funeral Home Ghost; The Desk of Evil; The Eerie Presence; The Haunted Playhouse; The Pond of Death; The Portrait From Beyond; The House of Murder; The Phantom Prankster.
4	UFO Kids: Real Kids, Spellbinding Tales	Allan Zullo	November 1, 1994	128	0-816-73566-2
Contains seven stories: The Black River Abductions; The Alien Healer; The Harden Ranch Intruders; The Time Being; The UFO Teardrops; Terror in the Outback; The Alien Book.
5	Haunted Animals: True Ghost Stories	Allan Zullo	September 1, 1995	128	0-816-73671-5
Nine tales involving a variety of animal ghosts. Stories: Twister's Farewell; The Tell-Tale Bones; The Spirit of Morgan's Woods; Bingo's Secret; The Haunting Vengeance; The Ghost of Walker's Bay; The Phantom Cat; Spike's Revenge; Rescue from the Beyond.
6	Haunted Campers: True Ghost Stories	Allan Zullo	July 28, 1996	128	0-816-73966-8
Eight stories about ghosts and phantoms found haunting campers. Stories: Beware the Serpent; Cry of the Banshee; The Rebel Ghosts; The Specter of Number Nine; The Ghosts of Moorehaven Bridge; The Wood-Givers; The Phantom of the Baxter Mine; The Skull of Leaping Buffalo.
7	The Haunted Graveyard and Other True Ghost Stories	Allan Zullo	September 1, 1996	128	0-816-73825-4
Ten stories describing hauntings of places, from caves to big city apartments. Stories: The Haunted Graveyard; The Jealous Ghost; The Greatest Fear of All; The Spirit of the Waverly Inn; Confession from the Beyond; The Ghostly House Call; The Fires of October; The Haunting of 707 Highview; The Crying Cave; The Last Good-Bye.
8	Haunted Baby-Sitters: True Ghost Stories	Allan Zullo	August 1, 1997	128	0-816-74328-2
Contains eight stories: The Demon Doll, Letter from the Beyond, The Secret Grave, The Uninvited, The Runaways, The Phantom Fiddler, The Pest, The Skeleton Ghost.
9	Haunted Teachers: True Ghost Stories	Allan Zullo	August 28, 1997	128	0-816-74195-6
Seven stories about ghosts and phantoms who have haunted teachers and students in the classroom, on the playground, and at home. Stories: The Phantom Rider; Curse of the Egyptian Bone; The Ghostly Friend; Time of Death; Dead Man's Shadow; The Mysterious Tapper; Heroine from the Beyond.
10	Haunted Athletes: True Ghost Stories	Allan Zullo	September 28, 1997	128	0-816-74315-0
AKA The Haunted Shortstop. Contains eight stories: Revenge of the Hawk; The Promise; The Phantom Touch; The Cursed Glove; The Field of Death; The Pep Talk; The Man in Blue; Teammate from Beyond.
11	Haunted Schools: True Ghost Stories	Allan Zullo	December 1, 1997	128	0-816-73837-8
Contains nine stories: The Stay-Behind; The Ghost from Never-Never Land; The Twelfth Man; The Kissing Ghost of Rosemont Academy; Screams of Horror, Cries of Terror; The Phantom Graduate; The Curse on Missy Green; The Scene-Stealer; The Red-Rock Spirits.

== Related titles by Zullo ==
#	Title	Author	Original published date	Pages	ISBN
1	The Ten Creepiest Places in America	Allan Zullo	January 1, 1997	96	0-816-74221-9
AKA America's Most Haunted: True Scary Places Stories include: Georgetown County - South Carolina, Marfa lights viewing area - Marfa, Texas, Area 51 - near Rachel, Nevada, The Myrtles Plantation - St. Francisville, Louisiana, America's Stonehenge - North Salem, New Hampshire, General Wayne Inn - Merion, Pennsylvania, Chaco Canyon - New Mexico, Gulf Breeze - Florida, Brown Mountain ghost lights viewing area - Brown Mountain, North Carolina, Hannah House - Indianapolis, Indiana.
2	The Ten Creepiest Creatures in America	Allan Zullo	July 28, 1997	96	0-816-74288-X
AKA America's Most Haunted: True Scary Creatures Stories include: Mothman, The Honey Island Swamp Monster, Champ, Bigfoot, Lizard Man, Mono, The Jersey Devil, The Lake Worth Monster, Whitey, The Fouke Monster.

== See also ==
- Allan Zullo
- Bruce Nash
- Haunted Lives: True Ghost Stories
- Scary Stories to Tell in the Dark
- Short & Shivery
