= Mr. Personality =

2003 reality television series

- Genre: Reality television
- Presented by: Monica Lewinsky
- Country of origin: United States
- Original language: English
- No. of seasons: 1
- No. of episodes: 5

Production
- Executive producers: Bruce Nash; Brian Gadinsky
- Production location: Malibu, California
- Running time: 1 hour
- Production company: Nash Entertainment

Original release
- Network: Fox
- Release: April 21 – May 19, 2003

Mr. Personality is an American reality television series broadcast by the Fox Broadcasting Company (Fox). The five-episode series premiered on April 21, 2003 and concluded on May 19, 2003. Filmed in Malibu, California, the series followed Hayley Arp, a 26-year-old stockbroker, as she selected a suitor among a group of twenty men. In an effort for Arp to select her suitor solely based on personality, all of the men were required to wear color-coded latex masks throughout the competition. Arp eliminated a predetermined amount of suitors each week until only one remained; upon selection of a final suitor, Arp was allowed to remove his mask and see his appearance. The series was hosted by American media personality Monica Lewinsky.

Mr. Personality was a part of Fox's intent to capitalize on the burgeoning success of the reality television genre. The series received unfavorable reviews from television critics, who derided the series' concept and the network's choice of casting Lewinsky as the host. The series premiered with strong ratings, however, they waned over the course of the season; the two-hour finale was condensed into a one-hour episode as a result of the series' subpar ratings. Since the series' end, several producers and contestants have voiced their regret over Mr. Personality.

== Format ==
Bachelorette Hayley Arp (center-left) and host Monica Lewinsky (center-right) surrounded by Arp's masked suitors

Set on an estate in Malibu, California, the series depicted a competition among a group of 20 men who attempted to court Hayley Arp, a 26-year-old stockbroker from Georgia. Through a series of dates and social interactions, Arp was required to select a suitor among the group of men solely on the basis of their personality. In order to conceal their appearance, the men were required to wear color-coded latex masks, in which only their eyes and mouths remained visible. The men additionally were prohibited from discussing their job titles or financial status. Arp had the opportunity to get a feel for the men's appearances during one-on-one dates set in "the dark room"; on these dates, the man removed his mask in the pitch-black room and Arp was permitted to feel his face. Arp eliminated a predetermined amount of contestants from the competition every week until only one man remained. Upon elimination, the men removed their masks and revealed their appearances to Arp. The series was hosted by American media personality Monica Lewinsky.

== Production ==
Since Fox is the network that has had the greatest success with the reality genre, I was very excited when they approached me to host the show. It sounds like good fun.

— Monica Lewinsky discussing her role as the series' host

Mr. Personality was filmed in Malibu, California, over the course of three weeks in March and April 2003. Fox searched for men between the ages of 24 and 40 to be suitors while they searched for a leading woman age 25 to 35, all of whom were required to be unmarried and childfree. Approximately 1,000 men were interviewed for a role in the series; the process included two interviews in addition to psychological, medical, and general background screening. Co-casting director Katy Wallin claimed that the appearance of the men was not a large consideration for producers when casting; rather, the producers sought men who had similar interests and priorities as Arp. Lewinsky, who had become well known due to the Clinton–Lewinsky scandal, was asked by Fox to host the series in hopes that she would attract more viewers. According to series creator Bruce Nash, "The combination of Monica Lewinsky with a concept like Mr[.] Personality will result in a big tune-in".

The masks were designed by American costume designer Tina Haatainen-Jones. The network asked Haatainen-Jones to create a mask devoid of any personality that still allowed the men the ability to easily speak. Haatainen-Jones believed the show sounded "stupid", although she accepted the work due to her status as a freelance artist. In an effort to make the masks unique, Haatainen-Jones crafted them to be reminiscent of a sculpture with a beaten metal appearance. Haatainen-Jones crafted a total of 40 masks, 30 of which were metallic and 10 of which were various colors. The network additionally asked Haatainen-Jones to craft a "chastity mask", which was bound by leather straps and a padlock. As a result, the mask could only be removed with a key that the network entrusted Haatainen-Jones with. The contestants did not know about the masks until they arrived in Malibu for filming; contestant Brian Karalus stated that he believed the masks were "ridiculous". Contestant Michael claimed that many of the men wore Maxi Pads underneath their masks in order to alleviate pressure on the bridge of the nose and to absorb sweat. Will Dyck, a real estate investor, won the competition and ultimately proposed to Arp.

== Episodes ==
No.	Title	Original release date	US viewers (millions)
1	"Episode 1"	April 21, 2003	12.2
Bachelorette Hayley Arp arrives to Malibu, where she meets her 20 masked suitors. After attending a masquerade ball, Arp is required to eliminate 10 suitors from the competition.
2	"Episode 2"	April 28, 2003	7.9
Arp goes on two separate group dates with the suitors, one sailing and the other to a winery. Arp is required to eliminate four suitors from the competition.
3	"Episode 3"	May 5, 2003	6.0
Arp must eliminate two suitors from the competition.
4	"Episode 4"	May 12, 2003	7
Arp goes on one-on-one dates with the remaining four suitors.
5	"Episode 5"	May 19, 2003	11.4
Arp consults her family as she makes a decision between the final two suitors.

== Reception ==
Alessandra Stanley of The New York Times claimed that the series was "interesting", although she criticized its underlying appeal of "snobbism and class tension." Lisa de Moraes of The Washington Post called the show's star a "chick who swallowed a large dose of Stupid Pills." In 2009, Time cited Mr. Personality as one of the top ten skanky reality television series.

=== Ratings ===
Mr. Personality premiered to over 12 million viewers; at the time, it was 2003's highest viewed premiere of a new reality television show. The premiere placed second in its time slot, although it succeeded in the 18-to-49-year-old demographic. The premiere aired after an episode of American Idol, which assisted in boosting its viewership.
