= Before They Were Stars =

- Genre: Documentary
- Written by: Philip Gurin
- Directed by: Ellen Brown
- Presented by: Scott Baio
- Narrated by: John Cramer
- Theme music composer: Ray Colcord
- Country of origin: United States
- Original language: English
- No. of seasons: 1

Production
- Executive producers: Tony Danza; Bruce Nash; Scott Sternberg
- Running time: 30 minutes
- Production companies: Nash Entertainment; Scott Sternberg Productions; Katie Face Productions; Columbia Pictures Television

Original release
- Network: ABC
- Release: 1 February – 1 June 1996

Before They Were Stars is a 30-minute American television show that aired on ABC in 1996 and was hosted by Scott Baio, with John Cramer as announcer and narrator.

The program originated as a series of specials that aired during 1994 and 1995; Joey Lawrence hosted the first two installments, with Karen Duffy taking the reins for the next two, and eventual series host Baio doing so for the fifth and final edition. All of the specials were an hour long, except the third, which was a half-hour.

The term "Before They Were Stars" has since become widely used by television shows and magazines when featuring segments and articles on famous actors in their lesser-known performances (and non-entertainment jobs).

== Description ==
This TV series showed film clips, commercials, television clips and screen tests of celebrities before they became famous, divided into segments spotlighting different genres: "Song of the Week" featured a musical performance by a then-unknown celebrity, while "As the Star Turns" showed celebrities who got their start in minor soap opera roles, and each episode ended with a "Viewer Mail" segment, in which Baio would read letters from home viewers who wanted to see a particular celebrity early in his or her career.

Each episode also featured a segment in which announcer Cramer would call on an audience member, who would be shown a clip of an unnamed celebrity in an early work, and then have the chance to win a cash prize by correctly identifying the celebrity in question.

=== Examples ===
- Yasmine Bleeth appeared in episode 4. She described the 1983 film Hey Babe!, in which she starred with actor/comedian Buddy Hackett, when she was 12 years old.
- In episode 7, Bleeth again appeared to introduce clips from the soap opera Ryan's Hope, on which she appeared as a teenager from 1985 to 1989.

== Cast ==
- Scott Baio – host; with various TV and film celebrities.

== Production credits ==
- Ellen Brown (director)
- Philip Gurin (writer)
- Tony Danza (executive producer)
- Steve Sauer (executive producer)
- Bruce Nash (executive producer)
- Scott Sternberg (executive producer)
- Nash Entertainment, Scott Sternberg Productions, Katie Face Productions and Columbia Pictures Television (production companies)
- Sony Pictures Television (distributor, 2002–Present)
