= Nick Bakay =

American actor, comedian, writer, producer and sportscaster (born 1959)

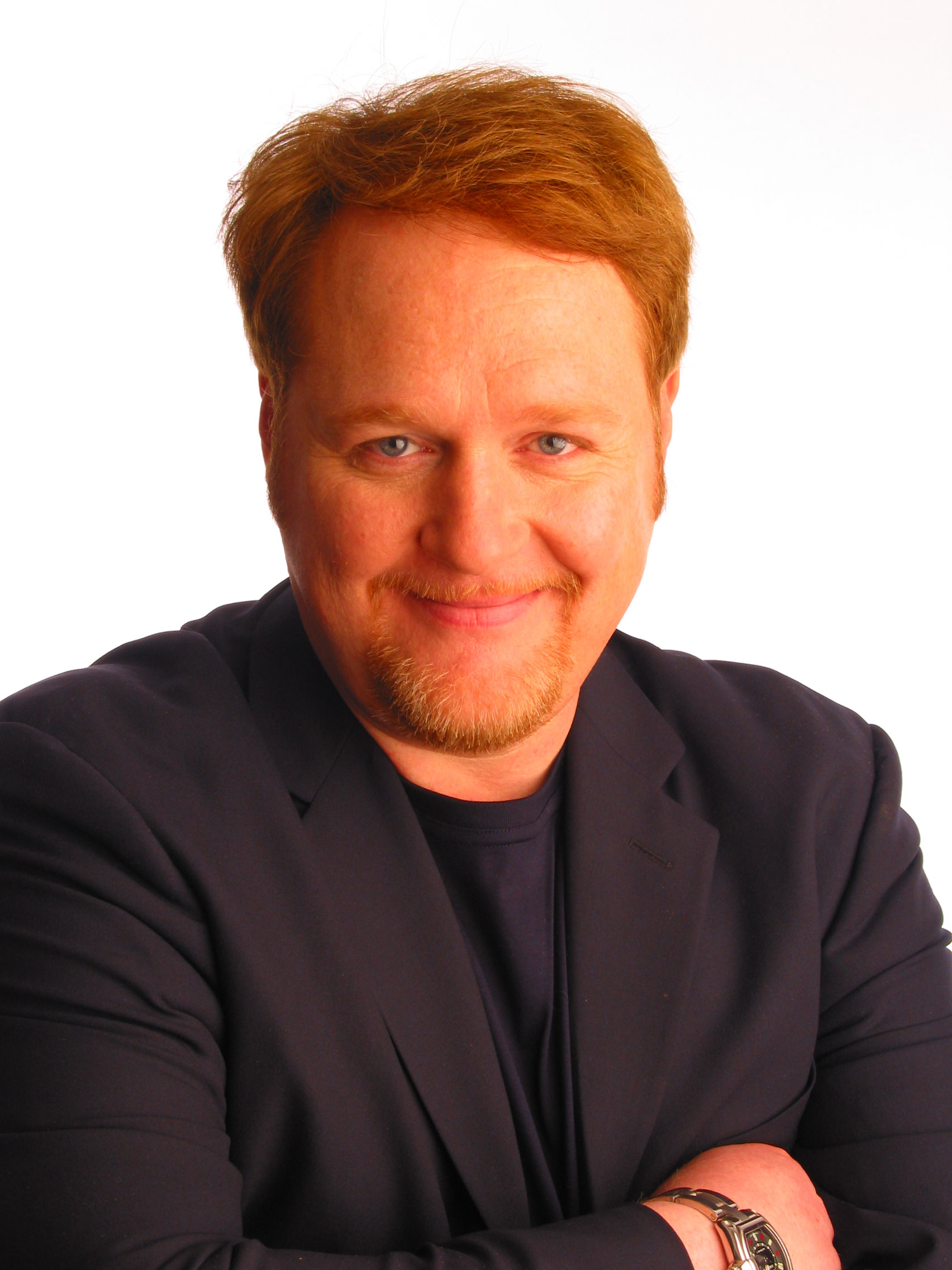
- Bakay in 2005
- Born: Nicholas Bakay; October 8, 1959 (age 67); Buffalo, New York, U.S.
- Occupations: Actor; comedian; writer; producer; sports commentator
- Years active: 1987–present
- Spouse: Robin Bakay (m. 1994)

Nicholas Bakay (/bəˈkaɪ/; born October 8, 1959) is an American actor, comedian, writer, producer and sports commentator. He is known as the voice of Salem Saberhagen on ABC/The WB's Sabrina the Teenage Witch and Sabrina: The Animated Series, and Norbert Beaver on The Angry Beavers. He played Karl on the Fox sitcom 'Til Death as well as serving as a producer of the show. He was also one of the executive producers of the CBS sitcom Mom.

== Early life ==
Bakay was born on October 8, 1959, in Buffalo, New York, where he attended Nichols School. He graduated from Kenyon College in 1981. He has Hungarian roots (his surname means "from Baka").

== Career ==
Bakay served as a writer of Sabrina the Teenage Witch, in which he also voiced Salem Saberhagen, a witch who has been transformed into the Spellman family's pet cat for trying to take over the world. Bakay also served as a writer for Sabrina: The Animated Series, providing his voice as Salem, as well. He was also the voice of Norbert on The Angry Beavers.

Bakay is a lifelong sports fan. He writes a weekly column for NFL.com called "Nick Bakay's Manly House of Football," as well as occasional columns for ESPN.com and ESPN The Magazine. He appears on SportsCenter on ESPN Wednesday and Thursday mornings during NFL season, and has frequently done segments on NFL Total Access on NFL Network. Bakay also has guest hosted numerous episodes of Up Close and Talk2, as well as contributed to Jim Rome Is Burning and numerous other sports shows.

Early in his career he wrote the storylines for the Evil Clown Comics series, which appeared in National Lampoon magazine. From 1993 to 1994, he was a writer for the comedy sketch series, In Living Color, and appeared as Stu Dunfy, the host of the fictional game show, The Dirty Dozens. He worked at Comedy Central, writing and appearing on numerous shows, including Night After Night with Allan Havey, and Sports Monster.

Beginning in 2000, Bakay worked as a producer on the CBS hit comedy, The King of Queens, where he also wrote and acted in several episodes. He co-wrote Paul Blart: Mall Cop (2009) as well as its sequel, Paul Blart: Mall Cop 2 (2015) with King of Queens star Kevin James.

In 2006, Bakay created, wrote, and voiced a cartoon for Comedy Central called The Adventures of Baxter and McGuire, which was nominated for an Emmy in the "Best Broadband Comedy" category.

From 2006 to 2010, Bakay served as a producer for and acted in the Fox comedy, 'Til Death.

In 2013, Bakay began as a producer for the series, Mom. Bakay also voiced the self-help radio announcer throughout the series.

=== Guest appearances ===
Bakay has guest-starred on numerous TV sitcoms. He appeared on In Living Color in a semi-recurring role as Stu Dunfy, guest-host of the sketch, "The Dirty Dozens" (and other voice work). He also appeared on the Seinfeld episode, "The Smelly Car" where Bakay played Elaine's boyfriend.

Bakay was seen or heard on That '70s Show. In the episode "Ski Trip", Bakay played Gus, a gay truck driver attracted to Kelso. In another episode, he was the voice of Donna's journal. In "An Eric Forman Christmas", he was the voice of Santa Claus in Kelso's Rankin-Bass-modeled dream.

Bakay had numerous recurring roles (such as Father McDaniel, Gus and miscellaneous voice work) on The King of Queens, which he also served as a producer and writer on. In the sitcom Ellen, Bakay starred as bookstore employee Lloyd in the second seasons' tenth episode, alongside comedian Ellen DeGeneres.

He had a supporting role on two late night talk shows: Night After Night with Allan Havey and Dennis Miller's short-lived show.

== Personal life ==
Bakay has been married to his wife Robin, since February 20, 1994.

In 2009, Bakay sold his condo home in West Hollywood for $2 million. He now lives in the Hollywood Hills.

== Filmography ==
=== Film ===
Year	Title	Role	Notes
1995	Jury Duty	Richard Hertz	
2001	Not Another Teen Movie	Diner Cook	Uncredited
2008	The Adventures of Baxter & McGuire: The Boss		Short film
2011	Zookeeper	Franky	
2011	Sabrina & Salem: Together Again	Salem Saberhagen	Funny or Die skit

=== Television ===
Year	Title	Role	Notes
1988	The Equalizer	Yellow Team Member	Episode: "Endgame"
1989–1992	Night After Night with Allan Havey	"Sidekick"/Cohost	Comedy Channel
1993	Seinfeld	Carl	Episode: "The Smelly Car"
1993	Morning Man at 88.0		TV movie
1993–1994	In Living Color	Stu Dunfy	6 episodes
1994	Grace Under Fire	Loomis P. Lemon	Episode: "A Car and a Kiss"
1994	She TV	Various	Episode: "Episode #1.2"
1994	Ellen	Lloyd	Episode: "Mrs. Koger"
1994	Murphy Brown	Reindeer	Episode: "Brown in Toyland"
1995	Coach	Rockne Dawson	Episode: "Coach's Cornered"
1995	What's So Funny?	Host	4 episodes
1995	The TV Wheel	Various	TV movie
1996	A Weekend in the Country	Dr. Randall	TV movie
1996–1999	ABC TGIF	Salem Saberhagen	12 episodes
1996–2003	Sabrina the Teenage Witch	Salem Saberhagen	Main Cast; 163 episodes
1997	You Wish	Salem Saberhagen	Episode: "Genie Without a Cause"
1997	Teen Angel	Salem Saberhagen	Episode: "One Dog Night"
1997	Boy Meets World	Salem Saberhagen	Episode: "No Guts, No Cory"
1997–2003	The Angry Beavers	Norbert Foster Beaver / Pete / Forest Friends / Additional Voices (voice)	Main Cast; 62 episodes
1998	Exposed! Pro Wrestling's Greatest Secrets	Narrator	TV movie
1998	The What a Idol Star	Judge	14 episodes
1998–1999	The Wonderful World of Disney	Salem Saberhagen	2 episodes
1999	It's Like, You Know...	Harvey	2 episodes
1999	The Brothers Flub	Additional Voices (voice)	16 episodes
1999	Sabrina Down Under	Salem Saberhagen	TV movie
1999	Sabrina: the Animated Series	Salem Saberhagen	65 episodes
1999–2001	That '70s Show	Santa / Donna's Journal / Gus the Trucker	3 episodes
2000–2005	The King of Queens	Gus / Father Melley / Father McDaniel / Home Center PA Announcer / Gil / Guy / Richard Nixon / Animal Channel Announcer / Sports Announcer / Theatre Usher	11 episodes
2001	Reel Classics	Host	
2004	The Simpsons	Salem Saberhagen (voice)	Episode: "Milhouse Doesn't Live Here Anymore"
2007–2010	'Til Death	Karl / Commercial Announcer	12 episodes
2013	Mom	Man on Tape / Man's Voice	2 episodes
2019	OK K.O.! Let's Be Heroes	Warlock (voice)	Episode: "OK A.U.!"
2019	The Late Late Show with James Corden	Salem Saberhagen	Episode: "Arnold Schwarzeneggar/Linda Hamilton"

=== Video games ===
Year	Title	Role	Notes
1998	Sabrina, the Teenage Witch: Spellbound	Salem Saberhagen	
2000	Sabrina, the Animated Series: Magical Adventure	Salem Saberhagen	
2000	Nicktoons Racing	Norbert	Archival recordings
2023	Nickelodeon All-Star Brawl 2	Norbert	

== Production work ==
Year	Film	Credited as			Notes
Year	Film	Director	Producer	Writer	Notes
1992	Night After Night	No	No	Yes	2 episodes
1992	The Dennis Miller Show	No	No	Yes	5 episodes
1993	Morning Man at 88.0	No	No	Yes	TV movie
1993–1994	In Living Color	No	No	Yes	23 episodes
1994	She TV	No	No	Yes	Episode: "Episode #1.2"
1995	What's So Funny?	No	No	Yes	4 episodes
1995	The TV Wheel	No	No	Yes	TV movie
1996	364 Girls a Year	No	No	Yes	
1996–2000	Sabrina the Teenage Witch	No	Yes	Yes	25 episodes (co-producer), 22 episodes (producer), 12 episodes (writer)
2000–2006	The King of Queens	No	Yes	Yes	118 episodes (consulting producer), 13 episodes (producer), 12 episodes (supervising producer), 5 episodes (writer)
2001	Reel Classics	No	No	Yes	
2006	The Adventures of Baxter & McGuire	No	No	Yes	
2006–2010	'Til Death	No	Yes	Yes	58 episodes (consulting producer), 2 episodes (writer)
2008	The Adventures of Baxter & McGuire: The Boss	No	No	Yes	Short Film
2009	Paul Blart: Mall Cop	No	No	Yes	Directed by Steve Carr
2011	Zookeeper	No	No	Screenplay	Directed by Frank Coraci
2012–2013	Two and a Half Men	No	Yes	Story and Teleplay	8 episodes (consulting producer), episode: "Throgwarten Middle School Mysteries" (story), episode: "Another Night with Neil Diamond" (teleplay)
2013–2021	Mom	Yes	Yes	Teleplay and Story	166 episodes (executive producer), 51 episodes (teleplay), 40 episodes (story), episode: "Tiny Dancer and an Impromptu Picnic" (director)
2015	Paul Blart: Mall Cop 2	No	No	Yes	Directed by Andy Fickman
2017-2021	Young Sheldon	No	No	Story	Episode: "A Brisket, Voodoo, and Cannonball Run", One Bad Night and Chaos of Selfish Desires
2018–2019	The Kominsky Method	No	Yes	No	16 episodes (consulting producer)
2019–2020	Bob Hearts Abishola	No	Yes	No	19 episodes (consulting producer)
2023	Bookie	No	Yes	Yes	16 episodes (executive producer)
2025	Leanne	No	Yes	Yes	5 episodes (executive producer)
