= Exposed! Pro Wrestling's Greatest Secrets =

- Cover of the VHS version of the special.
- Written by: Dave Boone; Michael Miller; Bruce Nash
- Directed by: Don Weiner
- Narrated by: Nick Bakay
- Composer: Danny Lux
- Country of origin: United States
- Original language: English

Production
- Executive producer: Bruce Nash
- Producers: Don Weiner; Troy A. Norton
- Running time: 45 minutes
- Production company: Nash Entertainment

Original release
- Network: NBC
- Release: November 1, 1998

Exposed! Pro Wrestling's Greatest Secrets is a 1998 television special about professional wrestling. It was first aired on NBC television on November 1, 1998, and released on VHS on September 22, 1999. Nick Bakay narrates. The special was produced by Nash Entertainment, the same company that produced Breaking the Magician's Code: Magic's Biggest Secrets Finally Revealed.

== Content ==
The stars of Exposed! Pro Wrestling's Greatest Secrets are eight real-life professional wrestlers who wear masks and work under pseudonyms to conceal their true identities. The reason given is that, by explaining wrestling's secrets (known as "breaking kayfabe" within the industry), their livelihood was at risk. The wrestlers are featured in a series of vignettes that explain how professional wrestling matches are staged, such as how participants in a match including the referee assist each other and how bookers plan storylines.

Exposed! Pro Wrestling's Greatest Secrets was filmed mostly at an empty Grand Olympic Auditorium in Los Angeles, although an audience was present for some scenes. One former participant, Michael Modest, claimed that the wrestlers had been initially misled into the nature of the show, and only discovered the true nature once they had signed their contracts. According to him at least one wrestler was quoted out of context during the trailer. He claimed also that the masks were added by the show, as the wrestlers did not fear the show would harm their careers, and questioned the show's accuracy.

== Reception ==
The World Wrestling Federation issued a statement about the special shortly before it aired, stating that "NBC has hired a bunch of bitter, masked wannabe 'pro wrestlers' that couldn't make the cut." The WWF further went on to say and that the real secret to professional wrestling was that "All of the WWF Superstars sacrifice their body and soul to entertain the fans."

A review published by the Canadian Online Explorer was heavily critical of the special and wrote that it revealed nothing that fans didn't already know and that wrestling crowds willingly suspend disbelief. They also wrote that the producers "insulted the viewers they sought to educate."
