= Wanna Come In? =

- Genre: Reality television
- Written by: Aaron Ginsburg; Wade McIntyre
- Directed by: Katherine Brooks; Jen Friesen
- Composer: Jeff Cardoni
- Country of origin: United States
- Original language: English
- No. of seasons: 2

Production
- Executive producer: Yann Debonne
- Producer: Michelle Brando
- Production company: Nash Entertainment

Original release
- Network: MTV
- Release: 1 June 2004

Wanna Come In? is an MTV reality television show. It was a modern reality twist on Edmond Rostand's legendary 1897 play Cyrano de Bergerac. In the show, a two-man team that consists of a "stud" and a "dud" competed with another "stud"/"dud" duo to try to win cash prizes. The "stud" secretly coached the "dud" by speaking through a hidden microphone while the "dud" was on a blind date with a beautiful young woman. Each team went through several challenges in an effort to get the "geek" invited inside the woman's home at the end of the date. If she did not invite her "dud" inside, the team lost.

Wanna Come In? was on the air for three seasons on MTV. It was a half-hour show that aired daily in the afternoons. The challenges usually had the "geeks" doing zany things that would make it almost impossible for the date to end well. If the "geek" asked to come in at the end of the date or revealed that he were being coached, the "geek/stud" duo was disqualified.
