= CopyCat Killers =

- Documentary
- Presented by: Dr. J. Buzz Von Ornsteiner
- Narrated by: Brian Stivale
- Country of origin: United States
- Original language: English
- No. of seasons: 3

Production
- Executive producers: Phil Claroni; Becky Dodson
- Running time: 60 minutes
- Production company: Story House

Original release
- Network: Reelz USA
- Release: February 27, 2016 – November 20, 2020

CopyCat Killers is a documentary-style television series that investigates real-life crimes that appear to be copied from actual Hollywood movies. The series debuted in 2016 and is broadcast in the United States by Reelz.

== Episodes featured ==
For its third season, premiering on Reelz on February 2, 2019, CopyCat Killers' new hour long episodes have been slated to examine CopyCat deaths based on movies and television shows including Slender Man, Casino, Twilight, A Nightmare on Elm Street and Fight Club.

=== Season 1 ===
Original film or television series - Similar killing(s)

- 01. Scream - Brian Draper and Torey Adamcik
- 02. Natural Born Killers - Ben Daris and Sarah Edmondson
- 03. Fatal Attraction - Carolyn Warmus
- 04. Heathers - Murder of Skylar Neese
- 05. Rambo - Christopher Dorner
- 06. American Psycho - Elliot Rodger
- 07. Taxi Driver - John Hinckley Jr.
- 08. Hannibal - Armin Meiwes
- 09. Saw - Death of Brian Wells
- 10. Freddy vs. Jason - Daniel Gonzalez
- 11. Dexter - Mark Twitchell
- 12. The Talented Mr. Ripley - Christian Gerhartsreiter
- 13. Queen of the Damned - Allan Menzies

=== Season 2 ===
Original film or television series - Similar killing(s)

- 14. The Dark Knight - James Holmes
- 15. The Matrix - John Muhammad and Lee Boyd Malvo
- 16. Breaking Bad - Jason Hart
- 17. The Basketball Diaries - Michael Carneal
- 18. RoboCop - Nathaniel White
- 19. Halloween - Jake Evans
- 20. The Sopranos - Jason Bautista
- 21. Child's Play - Murder of Suzanne Capper
- 22. Dirty Harry - Hi-Fi murders
- 23. Reservoir Dogs - Allan Bentley
- 24. X-Men - Jed Allen
- 25. Deliverance - Albert Fentress
- 26. The Purge - Jonathan Cruz
- 27. The Omen - Sean Sellers
- 28. Billionaire Boys Club - Lyle and Erik Menendez
- 29. The Collector - Leonard Lake and Charles Ng
- 30. Fear - Erin Caffey
- 31. The Fisher King - George Hennard
- 32. Kill Bill - Marcin Kasprzak

=== Season 3 ===
Original film or television series - Similar killing(s)

- 33. Primal Fear - Janice Orndoff
- 34. The Legend of Lizzie Borden - James Cushing
- 35. Casino - Matt Baker
- 36. Money Train - Vincent Ellerbe and James Irons
- 37. Slenderman - Slender Man stabbing
- 38. Basic Instinct - Murder of Jun Lin
- 39. The Exorcist III - Jeffrey Dahmer
- 40. The Silence of the Lambs - Michael Hernandez
- 41. Tangled - Murder of Dee Dee Blanchard
- 42. Forensic Files ep. "Past Lives" - Ari Squire
- 43. A Nightmare on Elm Street - Jason Moore
- 44. Goodfellas - Joe Post
- 45. Saw VI - Matthew Tinling
- 46. Bride of Chucky - Elena Lobacheva
- 47. A Clockwork Orange - Chelsea O'Mahoney
- 48. Texas Chain Saw Massacre - Robert Elmer Kleason
- 49. American Horror Story - Brittney Jade Dwyer
- 50. Twilight - Kim Edwards and Lucas Markham
