= World's Most Amazing Videos =

American reality television series (1999–2008)

- Genre: Reality television Clip show
- Created by: Bruce Nash
- Voices of: Don LaFontaine (announcer)
- Narrated by: Stacy Keach (1999–2007); Erik Thompson (2008)
- Theme music composer: Shawn K. Clement
- Composer: Shawn K. Clement
- Country of origin: United States
- Original language: English
- No. of seasons: 5
- No. of episodes: 65

Production
- Executive producers: Andrew Jebb; Bruce Nash; Robyn Nash; Debra Weeks
- Running time: 42 minutes (without commercials)
- Production companies: Nash Entertainment; NBC Studios

Original release
- Network: NBC (1999–2001); Spike TV (2006–2008)
- Release: March 3, 1999 – March 28, 2008

World's Most Amazing Videos is an American reality television series that ran on NBC from March 3, 1999, until 2001, as a filler program when other shows were cancelled and later revived on Spike TV from 2006 until 2008.

The show showcases accidents, disasters, police chases and other extraordinary events that were caught on video camera.

Until 2007, all episodes of the show were narrated by Stacy Keach. From that point on, the season was narrated by Erik Thompson. The show was broadcast in the United Kingdom on Bravo and Channel One, in which David Wartnaby served as the narrator of the first season followed by Lee Boardman in the second season of broadcast and was expected to return in 2012. In Australia, it is shown on the pay-TV channel Fox8. The series was given its own local name titled Global Shockers in the Philippines that was aired on ABC-5 (now known as TV5) from 2006 until 2007 and was hosted by Johnny Delgado, but upon cancellation of the former, this series was officially aired in its original title in 2008 until 2011 via RPN (under its interim blocktimer "Suspense Shift" via Solar Entertainment Corporation owned-C/S 9 (from 2008 until 2009) and carried over to Solar TV (from 2009 until 2011), now known as RPTV).

The fifth and final season changed the format; instead of multiple random clips in one episode, each episode now focuses on a certain theme.

== Synopsis ==
These videos normally show anybody involved in these aforementioned incidents surviving nonetheless. Although it is similar in content to other series like Real TV, World's Wildest Police Videos, Maximum Exposure, Most Shocking, Most Daring, Shockwave and Destroyed in Seconds, it took a more serious tone. The clips contain dangerous disasters, daring rescues, fights, amateur sports, robberies, animal attacks, and car accidents.

== Syndication and revival ==
All of the older episodes of World's Most Amazing Videos (NBC version run only) were re-aired on Spike TV from 2005 to 2008. A new series of episodes of the show were created in 2006 first-run for Spike, after a six-year hiatus from the NBC stint. The show was re-aired on CMT from 2009 to 2010, in Spanish on Telemundo as Videos Asombrosos until the late 2010s and Chiller from 2016 to 2017. The series aired reruns on Reelz, but the first 12 episodes premiered from November 7, 2023, to December 5, 2023. The next three episodes aired on May 20, 2024. The next two episodes of season 2 aired on June 17, 2024.

Since the closure of Bravo and Channel One in January 2011, the series has not aired on any other UK TV channels.

== Home media releases ==
From 1999 until 2000, Trimark Home Video (under the label NBC Home Video) released 13 episodes of the first season of the original NBC version of the show in six volumes on VHS.

On November 4, 2008, Universal Studios Home Entertainment released World's Most Amazing Videos: Volume One that features the first five episodes of the 2006 revival version (Season 3) on DVD in Region 1.

== See also ==
- Destroyed in Seconds
- Most Daring
- Real TV
- Shockwave
