= Dance Fever (2003 TV series) =

- Created by: Merv Griffin
- Presented by: Eric Nies
- Starring: Carmen Electra; Jamie King; MC Hammer
- Country of origin: United States

Production
- Executive producers: Merv Griffin; Bruce Nash; Bob Bain
- Camera setup: Multi-camera
- Running time: 22–24 minutes (30 minutes with commercials)
- Production companies: Merv Griffin Entertainment; Nash Entertainment; Bob Bain Productions

Original release
- Network: Freeform
- Release: July 13 – August 24, 2003

Dance Fever is an American variety game show hosted by Eric Nies. The three celebrity judges were Carmen Electra, Jamie King, and MC Hammer. The two-hour series premiere aired on ABC Family (now known as Freeform) on July 13, 2003.

In Canada, MuchMusic had the rights to air the series. Dance Fever also aired on Canada's Family Channel the same day as the ABC Family airings, becoming the only program on the channel to take commercial breaks during the show.

Three years later, tapdancing twins Sean and John became contestants on NBC's America's Got Talent. They did not make it to the finals, but were highly praised. Live in Color, a hip-hop booty-shaking dance crew from Florida, were the first and the only winner since the series did not continue.
