= Most Shocking =

American reality television series (2006–2010)

- Genre: Reality television
- Narrated by: Brian Cummings; Tyler Derek
- Theme music composer: Shawn K. Clement
- Composer: Shawn K. Clement
- Country of origin: United States
- Original language: English
- No. of seasons: 7
- No. of episodes: 89 (list of episodes)

Production
- Executive producers: Andrew Jebb; Matt Harris; Bruce Nash; Robyn Nash (for season 1); Debra Weeks
- Running time: 42 minutes
- Production company: Nash Entertainment

Original release
- Network: Court TV; TruTV
- Release: October 4, 2006 – November 10, 2010

Related
- Most Daring; Top 20 Countdown: Most Shocking

Most Shocking is an American reality television series that aired from October 4, 2006, to November 10, 2010 on Court TV (now TruTV). Following the series, two spin-offs were produced: Most Daring and Top 20 Countdown: Most Shocking.

The program held a TV-14 rating due to extremely violent situations depicted in the videos.

== Synopsis ==
The series generally features narrated segments based on video clips depicting criminal behavior, police pursuits, reckless driving, robberies, fights, and other shocking events caught on camera. Originally focused primarily on police and crime footage during its run on Court TV, the series expanded its coverage to include a wider variety of shock footage after moving to TruTV.

== Episodes ==
Season	Episodes	Originally released	
Season	Episodes	First released	Last released
1	13	October 4, 2006	December 27, 2006
2	14	March 14, 2007	July 18, 2007
3	14	July 25, 2007	January 9, 2008
4	14	January 16, 2008	June 18, 2008
5	7	July 10, 2008	October 22, 2008
6	13	November 5, 2008	February 18, 2009
7	14	July 29, 2009	November 10, 2010

== Syndication ==
The series currently reruns on True Crime Network since October 26, 2015, and on Reelz as of July 19, 2022. The series is currently streaming on Peacock as of July 6, 2023. As of 2025, thanks to its Nash Entertainment's multi-title distribution deal with Shout! Studios, the series is seen on streaming services including Plex, The Roku Channel, and Sling TV for free.

== International broadcasts ==
Country	TV network(s)	Series premiere	Weekly schedule	Status
Malaysia	TV3	January 2023	Sunday, 11:00 pm	Currently airing
Australia	Seven Network, Fox8	August 8, 2007	Wednesday, 7:30 pm	Fox8 Currently airing
Greece	Skai TV	Unknown	Weekends & Mondays, 2:00 am	Currently airing
Indonesia	Trans7	21 February 2016	Monday to Friday, 2:00 am	Ended 2018
Italy	AXN Italy	Unknown	Variable	Ended 2019
Poland	Polsat Play	December 1, 2012	Variable	Varied
Saudi Arabia	MBC Action	2010	Variable	Currently airing
United Kingdom	Pick TV	2006	Everyday, 2:00 am	Ended 2010
Latin America	TruTV Latin America	April 1, 2009	Monday to Friday, 9:00 am	Currently airing

== See also ==
- Police Camera Action! – a similar program broadcast on ITV1, ITV4, and Men & Motors.
- Road Wars – broadcast on Sky One, Sky Two, and Sky Three.
- Street Crime UK – a similar show with UK footage, also broadcast on Bravo.
- Street Law – also known as Street Wars. Broadcast on Sky One, Sky Two, and Sky Three.
- Traffic Cops – sometimes broadcast as Car Wars. BBC One program with similar format, also repeated on UKTV.
- World's Most Amazing Videos – a similar show that aired on NBC and Spike TV.
