= Frenchy the Clown =

Title character in National Lampoon's "Evil Clown Comics"

Publication information
- Publisher: National Lampoon
- Created by: Nick Bakay (writer), Alan Kupperberg (illustrator)

Frenchy the Clown is the title character in National Lampoon's "Evil Clown Comics", which ran in the late 1980s and early 1990s.

Nick Bakay created the Evil Clown storyline for National Lampoon utilizing Alan Kupperberg as the illustrator. Frenchy the Clown, the comic strip's main character, was not only bitter and evil, but had a "way with the ladies" and was often depicted in fairly sexually explicit scenes. According to Bakay's official website, he wrote these comics when he was "ever so slightly embittered and pissed off at the world". It was humorous, and even pushed the envelope of National Lampoon's lack of political correctness; the magazine's lawyers refused publication of one panel in a subsequently published story.
