= List of Most Shocking episodes =

Most Shocking is an American reality television series that originally aired on Court TV and later its successor TruTV. The series premiered on October 4, 2006 and ended on November 10, 2010, with a total of 89 episodes over the course of 7 seasons.

== Series overview ==
| Season | Episodes | Originally released | | |
| Season | Episodes | First released | Last released | Network |
|---|---|---|---|---|
| 1 | 13 | October 4, 2006 | December 27, 2006 | Court TV |
| 2 | 14 | March 14, 2007 | July 18, 2007 | Court TV |
| 3 | 14 | July 25, 2007 | January 9, 2008 | Court TV (episodes 1–12); TruTV (episodes 13 & 14) |
| 4 | 14 | January 16, 2008 | June 18, 2008 | TruTV |
| 5 | 7 | July 10, 2008 | October 22, 2008 | TruTV |
| 6 | 13 | November 5, 2008 | February 18, 2009 | TruTV |
| 7 | 14 | July 29, 2009 | November 10, 2010 | TruTV |

== Episodes ==
=== Season 1 (2006) ===
| No. overall | No. in season | Title | Original release date | Prod. code |
|---|---|---|---|---|
| 1 | 1 | "High Speed Pursuits" | October 4, 2006 | 101 |
| 2 | 2 | "Criminal Behavior" | October 11, 2006 | 102 |
| 3 | 3 | "Wild Riots" | October 18, 2006 | 103 |
| 4 | 4 | "Dangerous Drivers" | October 25, 2006 | 104 |
| 5 | 5 | "Deadly Force" | November 1, 2006 | 105 |
| 6 | 6 | "Robberies and Hold-Ups" | November 8, 2006 | 106 |
| 7 | 7 | "Stopped by the Law" | November 15, 2006 | 107 |
| 8 | 8 | "Undercover Stings" | November 22, 2006 | 110 |
| 9 | 9 | "Under Siege" | November 29, 2006 | 108 |
| 10 | 10 | "Criminal Behavior 2" | December 6, 2006 | 109 |
| 11 | 11 | "Wild Riots 2" | December 13, 2006 | 111 |
| 12 | 12 | "High Speed Pursuits 2" | December 20, 2006 | 112 |
| 13 | 13 | "Stopped by the Law 2" | December 27, 2006 | 113 |

=== Season 2 (2007) ===
| No. overall | No. in season | Title | Original release date | Prod. code |
|---|---|---|---|---|
| 14 | 1 | "High Speed Chases" | March 14, 2007 | 201 |
| 15 | 2 | "Fights & Wild Riots" | March 20, 2007 | 202 |
| 16 | 3 | "Criminals Out of Control" | March 21, 2007 | 203 |
| 17 | 4 | "Dangerous Drivers 2" | March 28, 2007 | 204 |
| 18 | 5 | "Robberies and Hold-Ups 2" | April 4, 2007 | 205 |
| 19 | 6 | "Under the Influence" | April 11, 2007 | 206 |
| 20 | 7 | "Under Siege 2" | April 18, 2007 | 207 |
| 21 | 8 | "Stopped by the Law 3" | June 6, 2007 | 208 |
| 22 | 9 | "Dumbest Criminals" | June 13, 2007 | 209 |
| 23 | 10 | "High Speed Chases 2" | June 20, 2007 | 210 |
| 24 | 11 | "Lawless Ladies" | June 27, 2007 | 211 |
| 25 | 12 | "Fights & Wild Riots 2" | July 4, 2007 | 212 |
| 26 | 13 | "Dangerous Drivers 3" | July 11, 2007 | 213 |
| 27 | 14 | "Best Of Most Shocking" | July 18, 2007 | 114 |

=== Season 3 (2007–08) ===
| No. overall | No. in season | Title | Original release date | Prod. code |
|---|---|---|---|---|
| 28 | 1 | "High Speed Chases 3" | July 25, 2007 | 301 |
| 29 | 2 | "Criminals Out of Control 2" | August 1, 2007 | 302 |
| 30 | 3 | "Bedlam & Brawls" | August 8, 2007 | 303 |
| 31 | 4 | "Stopped by the Law 4" | August 15, 2007 | 304 |
| 32 | 5 | "Lawless Ladies 2" | October 3, 2007 | 305 |
| 33 | 6 | "Citizens Under Attack" | October 10, 2007 | 306 |
| 34 | 7 | "Dangerous Drivers 4" | October 17, 2007 | 307 |
| 35 | 8 | "Under the Influence 2" | November 28, 2007 | 308 |
| 36 | 9 | "Fights & Wild Riots 3" | December 5, 2007 | 309 |
| 37 | 10 | "Criminals Out of Control 3" | December 12, 2007 | 310 |
| 38 | 11 | "Dumbest Criminals 2" | December 19, 2007 | 311 |
| 39 | 12 | "Chases & Crashes" | December 26, 2007 | 312 |
| 40 | 13 | "Bedlam & Brawls 2" | January 2, 2008 | 313 |
| 41 | 14 | "Best Of Most Shocking 2: Maximum Mayhem" | January 9, 2008 | 214 |

=== Season 4 (2008) ===
| No. overall | No. in season | Title | Original release date | Prod. code |
|---|---|---|---|---|
| 42 | 1 | "Criminals Out of Control 4" | January 16, 2008 | 401 |
| 43 | 2 | "Dangerous Drivers 5" | January 23, 2008 | 402 |
| 44 | 3 | "Robberies and Hold-Ups 3" | January 30, 2008 | 403 |
| 45 | 4 | "Bedlam & Brawls 3" | February 6, 2008 | 404 |
| 46 | 5 | "Mindless Mayhem" | February 13, 2008 | 405 |
| 47 | 6 | "Civilian Justice" | February 20, 2008 | 406 |
| 48 | 7 | "Deadly Force 2" | February 27, 2008 | 407 |
| 49 | 8 | "Lawless Ladies 3" | March 5, 2008 | 408 |
| 50 | 9 | "Fights & Wild Riots 4" | March 12, 2008 | 409 |
| 51 | 10 | "Drunk & Disorderly" | March 19, 2008 | 410 |
| 52 | 11 | "Citizens Under Attack 2" | March 26, 2008 | 411 |
| 53 | 12 | "Chases & Crashes 2" | April 2, 2008 | 412 |
| 54 | 13 | "Cops Under Attack" | April 9, 2008 | 413 |
| 55 | 14 | "Best Of Most Shocking 3: Reckless and Wild" | June 18, 2008 | 314 |

=== Season 5 (2008) ===
| No. overall | No. in season | Title | Original release date | Prod. code |
|---|---|---|---|---|
| 56 | 1 | "Best Of Most Shocking: Busted in the Buff" | July 10, 2008 | 501 |
| 57 | 2 | "Best Of Most Shocking: Seniors Gone Wild" | July 17, 2008 | 502 |
| 58 | 3 | "Best Of Most Shocking: Wild Assaults" | August 20, 2008 | 503 |
| 59 | 4 | "Best Of Most Shocking: Liquored Up Ladies" | August 27, 2008 | 504 |
| 60 | 5 | "Best Of Most Shocking: Citizen Justice" | October 1, 2008 | 505 |
| 61 | 6 | "Best Of Most Shocking: Four Wheel Demolition" | October 8, 2008 | 506 |
| 62 | 7 | "Best Of Most Shocking: Young and Dumb" | October 22, 2008 | 507 |

=== Season 6 (2008–09) ===
| No. overall | No. in season | Title | Original release date | Prod. code |
|---|---|---|---|---|
| 63 | 1 | "Drivers Out of Control" | November 5, 2008 | 601 |
| 64 | 2 | "Busted in the Buff 2" | November 12, 2008 | 602 |
| 65 | 3 | "Bedlam & Brawls 4" | November 19, 2008 | 603 |
| 66 | 4 | "Camcorder Chaos" | November 26, 2008 | 604 |
| 67 | 5 | "High Octane Impacts" | December 3, 2008 | 605 |
| 68 | 6 | "Wild Encounters" | December 10, 2008 | 608 |
| 69 | 7 | "Citizens Under Attack 3" | December 17, 2008 | 609 |
| 70 | 8 | "Competitions Gone Bad" | December 24, 2008 | 607 |
| 71 | 9 | "Party Pandemonium" | January 7, 2009 | 606 |
| 72 | 10 | "Lawless Ladies 4" | January 14, 2009 | 611 |
| 73 | 11 | "Criminals Out of Control 5" | January 21, 2009 | 610 |
| 74 | 12 | "Camcorder Chaos 2" | January 28, 2009 | 612 |
| 75 | 13 | "Under the Influence 3" | February 11, 2009 | 613 |

=== Season 7 (2009–2010) ===
| No. overall | No. in season | Title | Original release date | Prod. code |
|---|---|---|---|---|
| 76 | 1 | "Lawless Ladies 5" | July 29, 2009 | 701 |
| 77 | 2 | "Fights & Wild Riots 5" | August 5, 2009 | 702 |
| 78 | 3 | "Busted in the Buff 3" | August 12, 2009 | 704 |
| 79 | 4 | "Chases & Crashes 3" | October 7, 2009 | 703 |
| 80 | 5 | "Citizens Under Attack 4" | December 21, 2009 | 706 |
| 81 | 6 | "Criminals Out of Control 6" | February 10, 2010 | 709 |
| 82 | 7 | "Drunk and Disorderly 2" | March 3, 2010 | 710 |
| 83 | 8 | "Chases and Crashes 4" | March 17, 2010 | 705 |
| 84 | 9 | "Fights and Wild Riots 6" | March 24, 2010 | 707 |
| 85 | 10 | "Busted in the Buff 4" | March 31, 2010 | 708 |
| 86 | 11 | "Bare Knuckle Brawls" | September 1, 2010 | 801 |
| 87 | 12 | "Busted by the Badge" | September 1, 2010 | 802 |
| 88 | 13 | "Citizens Under Siege" | November 3, 2010 | 803 |
| 89 | 14 | "Busted in the Buff 5" | November 10, 2010 | 804 |
