= Robot Holocaust =

- Directed by: Tim Kincaid
- Written by: Tim Kincaid
- Produced by: Charles Band; Cynthia DePaula
- Starring: Norris Culf; Nadine Hart; Joel Van Ornsteiner
- Cinematography: Arthur D. Marks
- Edited by: Barry Zetlin
- Production company: Taryn Productions
- Distributed by: Empire Pictures
- Release date: January 20, 1987 (United States)
- Running time: 79 minutes
- Country: United States
- Language: English

Robot Holocaust is a 1987 post-apocalyptic science fiction film written and directed by Tim Kincaid, and produced by Charles Band.

== Plot ==
After society was almost destroyed in a robot rebellion in 2033, the remnants are either slaves to the Dark One in the one city that remains or nomads in the outside world. Slaves either work to power the city or fight in death matches for the other slaves to watch and for the Dark One's entertainment. While the winners of these matches are promised a reward, they receive death instead. The games are used to weed out of the population the biggest and the strongest to prevent rebellion in New Terra, the last city on Earth.

Just outside New Terra (New York City), Neo, a drifter from the atomic-blasted wastelands and his klutzy robot sidekick arrive at a factory where slaves labor to fuel the Dark One's Power Station. He meets Deeja, who convinces him to help rescue her father. Her father is a scientist who has invented a device that can break the Dark One's control over the factory slaves. Gathering a motley crew of allies on the way, Neo and Deeja go to the Power Station to confront the Dark One's evil servants. They find her father's body has been forcibly linked to the Dark One and is beyond saving, forcing Neo to kill both the Dark One and Deeja's father. With the Dark One dead and the slaves free, Deeja stays behind to continue her father's work, while Neo returns to the wastelands with his robot sidekick.

== Cast ==
- Norris Culf as Neo
- Nadine Hart as Deeja
- Joel Van Ornsteiner as Klyton
- Jennifer Delora as Nyla
- Andrew Howarth as Kai
- Angelika Jager as Valaria
- Michael Downend as Jorn
- Rick Gianasi as Torque
- George Gray as Bray
- Nicholas Reiner as Haimsa
- Michael Azzolina as Roan
- John Blaylock as Korla

== Production ==
Director Tim Kincaid stated he wanted to differentiate his film from the glut of post-apocalyptic films that came prior and showed Planet of the Vampires to his art and cinematography crew to saturate the movie with color. Most of the film was shot around the abandoned Brooklyn Navy Yard over the course of 15 days. Kincaid voiced hope the film would be the first in a series set in the post-apocalyptic world of New Terra and was interested in having the sequel set in space on board an abandoned space station. The sequel ultimately was never made.

== Release ==
The film received a direct-to-video issuing in the United States nine months later by Wizard Video. In 2001, MGM released an Amazon Exclusive VHS.

MGM released the film in widescreen on Hulu. On November 29, 2018, Scorpion Releasing announced they would release the film on Blu-ray.

== Reception ==
From contemporary reviews, a reviewer credited as "Lor." of Variety reviewed the Wizard Video VHS on January 8, 1987. "Lor." felt the film "lacks the production values and large-scale set-pieces required of a theatrical action pic, but is a suitable entry for home video fans." The review went on to note that "The Robot designs are intriguing" while the "Monsters are disappointing" noting the giant worms as hand puppets; while the acting was "mainly deadpan, except for the beautiful Angelika Jager, camping it up as the villainess."

== Legacy ==
The film was featured during the first season of Mystery Science Theater 3000, after fans (along with Joel and the bots) complained about the lack of color films. This version was released on DVD by Shout Factory on December 4, 2012.

== Sources ==
- Lor. (1991). Variety's Film Reviews 1987-1988. Vol. 20. R. R. Bowker. There are no page numbers in this book. This entry is found under the header "January 21, 1987". ISBN 0-8352-2667-0.
