= Allan Zullo =

American non-fiction writer (born 1947)

Allan Zullo (born November 23, 1947) is an American non-fiction writer. He is the author or co-author of more than 120 paperbacks for adults and younger readers on a broad range of subjects for general audiences.

Zullo has several notable books, including the Haunted Kids series. He also co-wrote with The Baseball Hall of Shame and Baseball Confidential Bruce Nash, and A Boomer's Guide to Grandparenting with his wife Kathryn.

In addition to writing books, Zullo created a comic strip, The Ghost Story Club, which was published in American newspapers from 1995–98.

Zullo was raised in Rockford, Illinois and attended Northern Illinois University, earning a degree in journalism in 1969.

== Publications ==
  - Police Heroess: Young Survivors of the Holocaust
  - We Fought Back: Teen Resisters of the Holocaust
  - Escape: Children of the Holocaust
  - Heroes of the Holocaust: True Stories of Rescues by Teens
  - Survivors: True Stories of Children in the Holocaust
- Bad Pets series
  - Bad Pets: Bad to the Bone
  - Bad Pets Hall of Shame
  - Bad Pets on the Loose!
  - Bad Pets: Most Wanted
  - Bad Pets: True Tales of Misbehaving Animals
  - Bad Pets Save Christmas
- Haunted Kids series
  - Haunted Kids: True Ghost Stories
  - More Haunted Kids
  - Totally Haunted Kids
  - Haunted Campers
  - Haunted Schools
  - Haunted Teachers
  - Haunted Animals
  - The Haunted Graveyard
  - Haunted Baby-Sitters
  - The Haunted Shortstop
  - Haunted Athletes
- America's Most Haunted: True Scary Creatures
- America's Most Haunted: True Scary Places
- We're Here: True Tales of Alien Encounters
- Weird But True Tales
- Animal Books
  - The Dog Who Saved Christmas
  - The Dog Who Saved Halloween
  - Christmas Miracle Pets
  - Miracle Pets: True Tales of Courage and Survival
  - True Tales of Animal Heroes
  - Incredible Dogs and Their Incredible Tales
- Partial List of Other Books
  - World's Dumbest Crooks
  - World's Dumbest Crooks 2
  - Fact or Fake
  - Butter My Butt and Call Me a Biscuit
  - You're the Butter on My Biscuit
  - Golf Is a Funny Game
  - Amazing But True Golf Facts
  - March Madness
  - The Hero Inside of You
- The Baseball Hall of Shame: The Best of Blooperstown (co-written with Bruce Nash)
- The Baseball Hall of Shame (co-written with Bruce Nash)
- Baseball Confidential (co-written with Bruce Nash)
- A Boomer's Guide to Grandparenting (co-written with his wife Kathryn)
