= Erik Thompson =

American voice actor (born 1959)

- Born: July 22, 1959 (age 66); La Jolla, California, U.S.
- Occupations: Voice actor, television announcer
- Years active: 1991–present
- Website: http://www.etvo.net

Erik Thompson (born July 22, 1959) is an American voice actor and television announcer.

== Career ==
After starting out as a disc jockey in San Diego and Los Angeles radio, he began pursuing a career in voiceover. Thompson eventually found work as a promotional voice of HBO, which led to promotional announcements and program narration on several other networks.

His work includes narrating the TV series The Universe on The History Channel, Crimes of the Century on CNN, World's Most Amazing Videos and many other television series featured on Discovery Channel, The Science Channel, The History Channel, NBC, MSNBC, The Weather Channel, National Geographic Channel, Spike and CNN.

Thompson has performed voice-overs for hundreds of national television and radio commercials, non-broadcast narration, television infomercials, animated voice and web-based content.

As a promotional voice, he has at various times been a fixture of several television networks, including Ion Television, National Geographic Channel, Nat Geo Wild, FX, CBS, NBC, HBO, Animal Planet, Showtime, TBS, Discovery Channel, Investigation Discovery, and others. He also is the promotional voice of several local affiliate stations across the United States.
