= Grand Olympic Auditorium =

Multi-purpose arena in Los Angeles, California, U.S.

Coordinates: 34.0341°N 118.2680°W

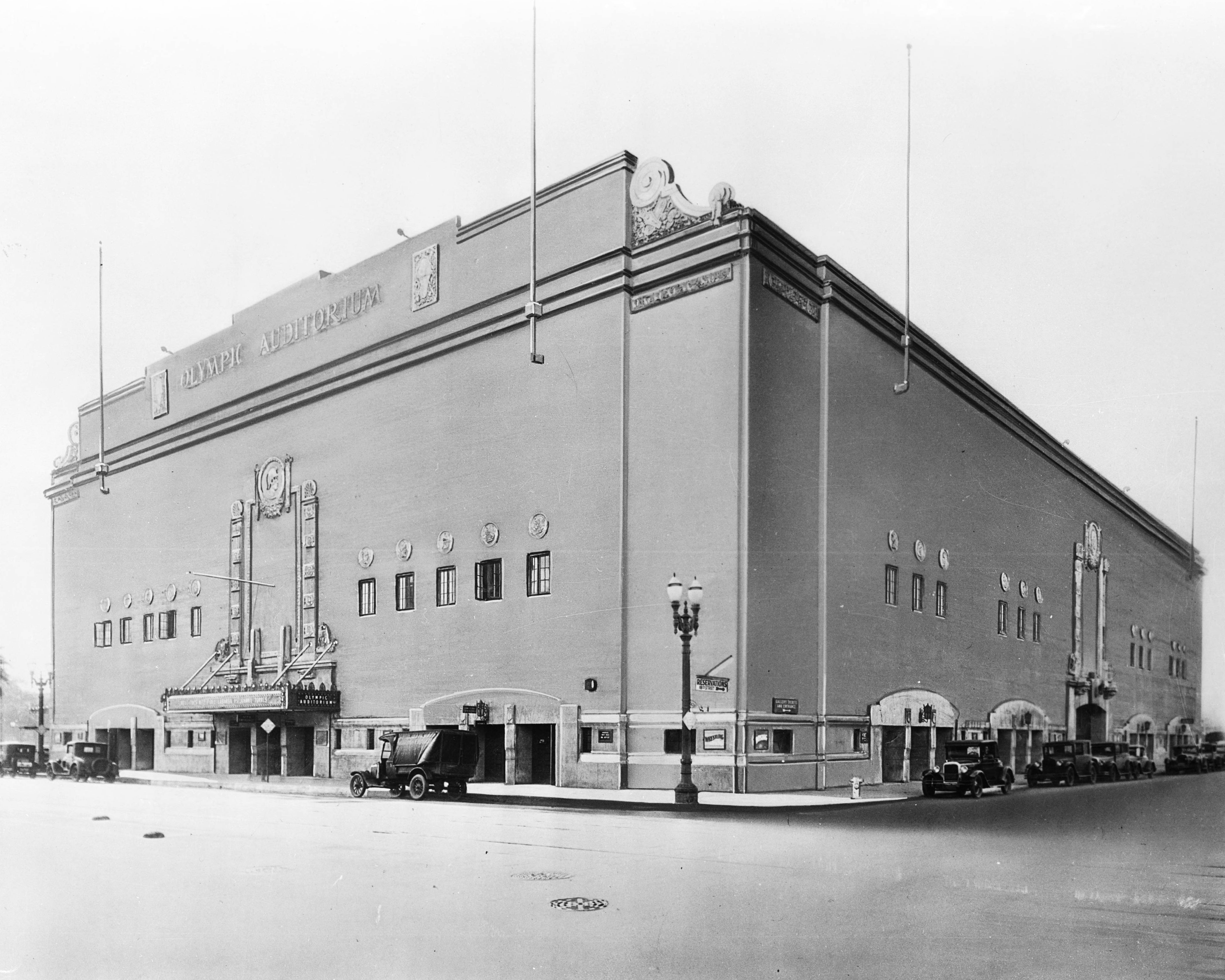
Exterior view of the Grand Olympic Auditorium (ca. 1930).

The Grand Olympic Auditorium is a former multi-purpose sports venue in southern Downtown Los Angeles, California. The venue was built in 1924 at 1801 South Grand Avenue, now just south of the Santa Monica Freeway. The grand opening of the Olympic Auditorium took place on August 5, 1925 and was a major media event, attended by celebrities Jack Dempsey and Rudolph Valentino among others. One of the last major boxing and wrestling arenas still in existence, the venue serves as a worship space for a Korean-American evangelical church, Glory Church of Jesus Christ.

== History ==
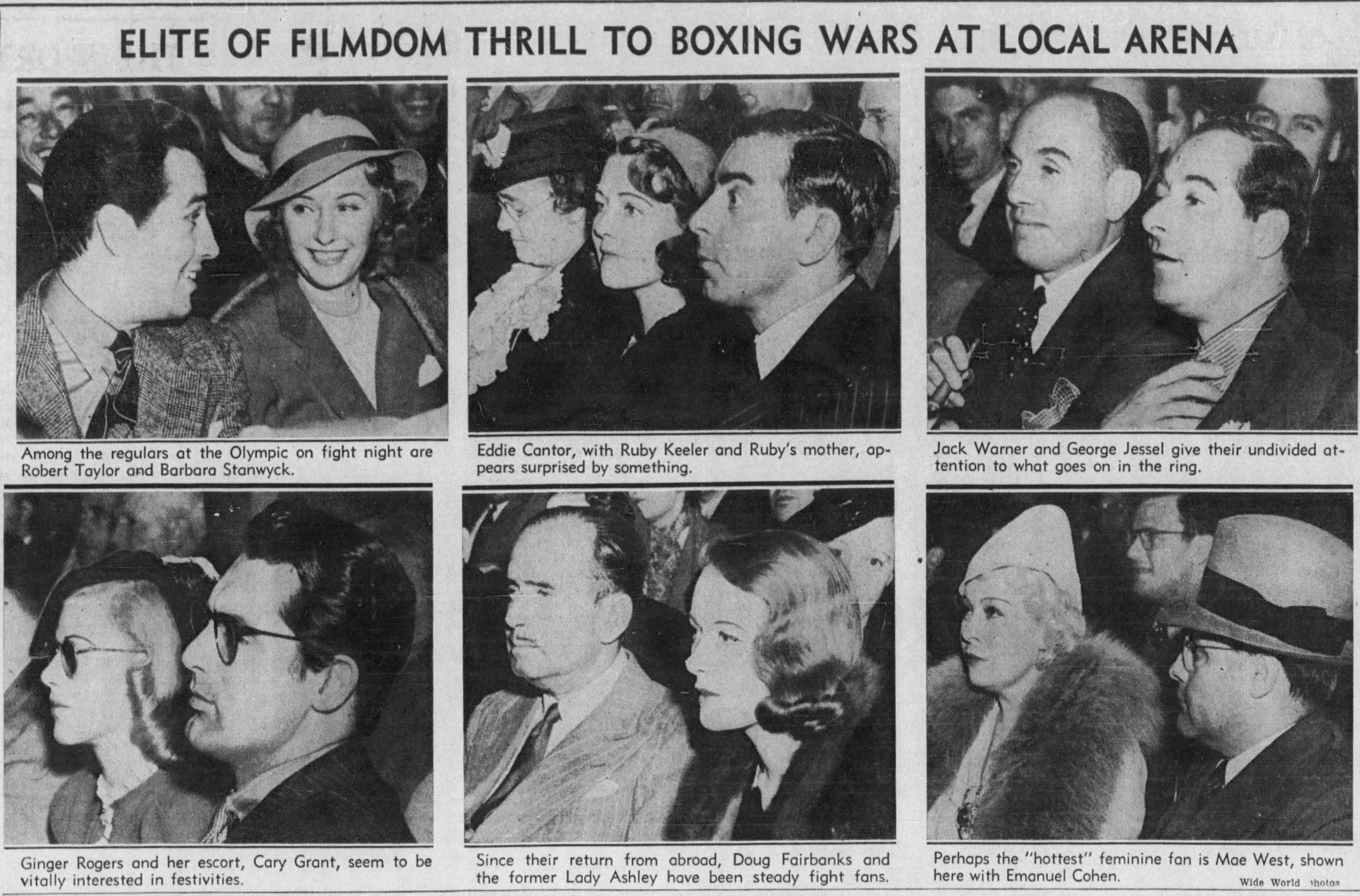
"Elite of Filmdom Thrill to Boxing Wars at Local Arena" Los Angeles Times, April 27, 1937

Seating capacity was 10,400 in the 1920s and 1930s. In 1936, the facility boasted more gate entries than Chicago Stadium and Madison Square Garden combined and approximately twice the ticket sales of rival Hollywood Legion Stadium.

Throughout the 1930s, 1940s and 1950s it was home to some of the biggest boxing, wrestling, and roller derby events in the country.

=== 1932 Olympics ===
The Auditorium was leased by the 1932 Summer Olympics Organizing Committee for a very nominal sum sufficient to cover expenses, for the purpose of conducting the training and competitions of the boxing, wrestling and weightlifting events of the Games. At the time it was the largest indoor venue in the United States.

=== Boxing ===
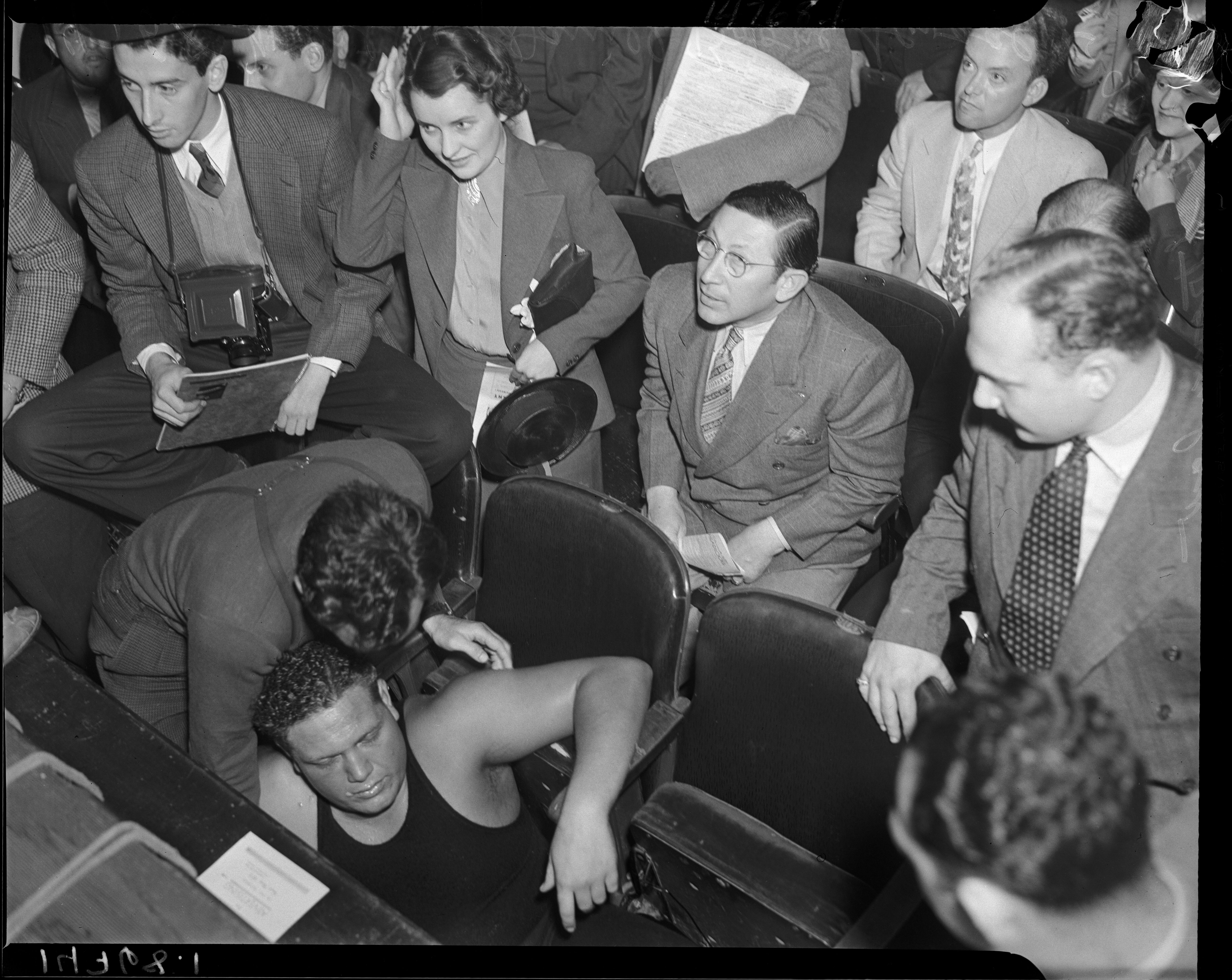
Jules Strongbow is knocked out of the ring during a wrestling match at the Grand Olympic Auditorium on May 16, 1937.

It has become somewhat of a landmark for boxing history. Charles Bukowski wrote about the Olympic: "even the Hollywood (Legion Stadium) boys knew the action was at the Olympic. Raft came, and the others, and all the starlets, hugging those front row seats. the gallery boys went ape and the fighters fought like fighters and the place was blue with cigar smoke, and how we screamed, baby baby, and threw money and drank our whiskey, and when it was over, there was the drive in, the old lovebed with our dyed and vicious women. you slammed it home, then slept like a drunk angel."

The 1960s and 1970s were a major boom period for the Olympic. Major boxing and wrestling events were held at the arena every other Friday night. It also was home to the Los Angeles T-Birds in the Roller Games.

=== Closure ===
The arena closed its doors in the mid-1980s when promoter Mike Le Bell discontinued his weekly wrestling shows due to low attendance figures when the boom of the professional wrestling era began. This was when the wrestling scene shifted from Los Angeles to Dallas' World Class, Minneapolis' AWA, Jim Crockett Promotions Mid-Atlantic/NWA, and Stamford's WWF, now known as the WWE.

In the early 1980s Golden Voice productions began promoting Punk Rock concerts at the Olympic Auditorium. Notable punk acts that performed there include Public Image, Black Flag, Circle Jerks, U.K.Subs, and Discharge.

=== Reopening ===
It reopened in 1993, but the capacity was reduced from 10,400 to just over 7,300. In the 2000s the Auditorium sat 7,030 for boxing and wrestling, 4,514 for seated concerts, and 7,007 for general admission concerts. Up to 773 seats could be put on the arena floor, which measured 12,100 square feet (110' by 110').

Throughout the early and mid 1990s, the venue was often the host of many large, all-night rave parties, often held outdoors in the back parking lot, as well as inside the auditorium. On New Year's Eve of 1996/1997, a large-scale rave called In Seventh Heaven was being held at the Olympic. Dozens of people had to be taken to the hospital from a suspected overdose of a legal high called Liquid fX, which was being handed out at the party. The event which had already gathered over 10,000 ravers was shut down by the LAPD before midnight, sending much of the crowd into the street, where a melee broke out between upset revelers and riot police.

On July 16, 2000, ECW held its Heatwave pay-per-view at the Grand Olympic Auditorium. It was ECW's first and only West Coast appearance. Prior to the main event, six wrestlers from the LA-based Xtreme Pro Wrestling promotion, who were given front row tickets by promotion owner Rob Zicari, donned shirts of their promotion, which caught the attention of Tommy Dreamer and ECW security and were promptly ejected. A brawl followed in the parking lot between XPW ring crew and the ECW locker room, based on false reporting that Francine had been touched by someone from XPW.

On February 23, 2002, XPW held its Freefall event at the Grand Olympic Auditorium where New Jack tossed Vic Grimes off a 40-foot scaffold.

Wrestling legends such as Jim Londos, Joe Stecher, Ed "Strangler" Lewis, Gus Sonnenberg, Ray Steele, Frank Sexton, Man Mountain Dean, Everett Marshall, Ed Don George, Enrique Torres, Baron Michele Leone, Freddie Blassie, John Tolos, Buddy Roberts, The Sheik, Fritz Von Erich, Gorgeous George, The Great Goliath, Black Gordman, Bobo Brazil, Buddy Rogers, Roddy Piper and Chris Adams competed in the arena at one point in their careers, along with the legendary Lou Thesz, Mil Mascaras and André the Giant. Adams was one of the last big draws at the Olympic before promoters Mike Le Bell and Gene LeBell ended its wrestling cards in 1982. Adams went to Portland afterwards and eventually to Dallas to join Fritz Von Erich's World Class Championship Wrestling, as the sport's top wrestling city shifted from Los Angeles to Dallas and Atlanta before Vince McMahon's WWF reached national prominence.

=== Music venue ===
Until 2005, the Olympic Auditorium was host to many music concerts and shows, as well as boxing and wrestling. The arena is famous for its box office number "RI-9-5171" (213) 749-5171 which is no longer in use.

As far back as 1951, there had been rhythm and blues concerts at the Grand Olympic. In 1969–70, The Grand Olympic Auditorium hosted concerts by hard rock acts such as Mountain, Jack Bruce, and Ten Years After. It would be used more extensively as a musical venue after 1980. This period in music performances began with a concert by the band Public Image Ltd. which was produced by Punk Rock impresario David Ferguson and his independent CD Presents production company. This was the first concert held at the auditorium since the early 1970s and is credited with beginning the Olympic's reputation for being a notorious Punk Rock venue. Thereafter legendary promoter Gary Tovar and Goldenvoice Productions started booking shows at the venue, with monthly concerts by the likes of GBH, The Exploited, T.S.O.L., SIN 34, Suicidal Tendencies, UK Subs, New Regime, Circle Jerks, Angelic Upstarts, The Dickies, Wasted Youth, Dead Kennedys, The Vandals, D.O.A., Love Canal, Bad Religion, FEAR, M.I.A. and many others. Black Flag was the headliner for a New Year's Eve show 1981–82.

Famous musical acts have also used the Olympic Auditorium for their music videos. Survivor's music video for Burning Heart was shot in the venue in October 1985. Bon Jovi filmed the music videos for "You Give Love A Bad Name" and "Livin' On A Prayer" in the auditorium, with Wayne Isham directing them. Kiss filmed the music video of the namesake track of their 1987 album Crazy Nights in the same venue. The music video for Janet Jackson's "Control" was recorded here as well in the same year. In 1991, Van Halen filmed the music video for their hit song Poundcake (song) at the auditorium.

=== Glory Church of Jesus Christ ===
In 2005, the Glory Church of Jesus Christ, a Korean-American Christian church, purchased the entire property. Although the name Grand Olympic Auditorium ceased to exist, many locals and longtime residents of Los Angeles still refer to the property by its former names. In 2007, the arena was given a new facelift back to its original brown coat of paint that was abandoned in 1993 when the arena reopened.

== Physical features ==
- 32-by-40-foot (9.8 by 12.2 m) portable stage.
- 55-foot (17 m) ceiling height
- 2 large loading docks
- 13 dressing rooms
- 8 concession stands
- 5 ticket windows
- 2.8 kilowatt-per-channel stereo PA system with CD and cassette tape player, 2 wireless microphones and 1 wired microphone.
- 7 restrooms, all renovated (3 are handicap accessible)
- 10 C.M. Loadstar motors (4 for flying sound, 4 for stage lighting, 2 for additional lighting) plus 2 aluminum trusses (20.5 inches by 20.5 inches by 40 feet).
- 200 telephone lines, installed by AT&T
- Parking lot with 550 spaces; another 2,300 spaces at nearby garage.
- Fully equipped VIP (seating up to 40) and press rooms.
- 2 merchandising stands.
- Three 200 ampere 480/277 volt 3-phase, 4-wire transformers, including an isolated transformer.
- One 400 ampere 480/277 volt 3-phase, 4-wire transformer.
- 40 kW Caterpillar generator for "back-up" emergency lighting.
- 8-zone (dual control) dimming system for house lights by Lutron.
- 50-by-50-foot (15 m × 15 m) aluminum lighting truss with 72 par fixtures, permanently installed.

== Filming location ==
Films and TV series with scenes shot at the Grand Olympic Auditorium include:

- Battling Butler (1926)
- The Turning Point (1952)
- The Manchurian Candidate (1962)
- Requiem for a Heavyweight (1962)
- Mannix (1970) ol
- California Split (1974)
- Rocky (1976)
- Starsky & Hutch (1976)
- The Incredible Hulk episode "Final Round" (1978)
- The Champ (1979)
- Rocky II (1979)
- Raging Bull (1980)
- The Incredible Hulk episode "The Psychic" (1980)
- The Incredible Hulk episode "Half Nelson" (1981)
- Rocky III (1982)
- The Sting II (1983)
- Ed Wood (1994)
- Virtuosity (1995)
- Exposed! Pro Wrestling's Greatest Secrets (1998)
- BASEketball (1998)
- Man on the Moon (1999)
- Ready to Rumble (2000)
- Charlie's Angels: Full Throttle (2003)
- Heart Like a Hand Grenade (2015)
