= Reelz =

American digital cable and satellite television network

- Country: United States
- Broadcast area: Nationwide
- Headquarters: Albuquerque, New Mexico

Programming
- Language: English
- Picture format: 720p (HDTV) (HD feed downgraded to letterboxed 480i for SDTVs)

Ownership
- Owner: Hubbard Broadcasting
- Sister channels: Ovation

History
- Launched: September 27, 2006; 20 years ago
- Former names: ReelzChannel (2006–12)

Links
- Website: www.reelz.com

Availability

Streaming media
- Service(s): DirecTV Stream, Frndly TV, Peacock, Philo, Sling TV

Reelz (formerly known as Reelz Channel) is an American digital cable and satellite television network owned by Hubbard Broadcasting. The network's programming was formerly devoted to entertainment-oriented programming focusing on the Hollywood film and entertainment industry, with programs featuring information on theatrical film releases as well as information on movies released on DVD and airing on cable television. Currently, outside a few entertainment programs, and some reality series and films, the network mainly airs original and acquired films, series, and programming relating to true crime and celebrity scandals.

As of November 2023, Reelz is available to approximately 35,000,000 pay television households in the United States-down from its 2015 peak of 68,000,000 households.

== History ==
Previous Reelz logo as ReelzChannel (2006–2012)

The network launched on September 27, 2006 as ReelzChannel, initially available on satellite providers DirecTV and Dish Network. The network originally maintained a programming focus similar to the original format of E! (and its predecessor MovieTime), focusing on programs about the entertainment industry including movie review and junket interview series. The network eventually signed carriage agreements with various cable providers including Time Warner Cable, Comcast, Charter Communications and Altice. The network's programming then was tailored to allow insertion of order details and channel positions for film titles being offered through each provider's pay-per-view and video on demand systems.

In early 2009, ReelzChannel moved its operations from Los Angeles, California, to Albuquerque, New Mexico, where Hubbard owns that city's NBC-affiliated television station KOB. KOB and ReelzChannel, however, maintain separate facilities. At that point, the network shifted its programming focus to incorporate acquired series alongside its entertainment news programs. In August 2011, ReelzChannel debuted its first miniseries, The Kennedys. An unauthorized biopic centering on President John F. Kennedy, Jackie Kennedy and the Camelot empire, ReelzChannel acquired the rights to the film after it was dropped by History.

In February 2023, Reelz reached an agreement with NBCUniversal-owned streaming service Peacock, which would carry a linear feed of Reelz and the network's library of programming for subscribers. MLW Underground Wrestling from Major League Wrestling is blacked out and replaced with alternate programming on Peacock due to WWE's exclusivity agreements with the service.

== Programming ==
Reelz original programming is produced both in the US and internationally. For example, the network premiered a docudrama in 2017, Titanic: Sinking The Myths, starring Ed Asner, examining the circumstances surrounding the ocean liner disaster. In 2020, Reelz ordered The Story of the Songs from ViacomCBS Networks UK, in association with the British branch of Paramount Network.

In June 2022, Reelz acquired Cops and later greenlit On Patrol: Live, a spiritual successor to the cancelled A&E program Live PD.

The network's original promotional remit regarding cable and satellite pay-per-view and video on demand services, which remains in its carriage contracts, is contractually fulfilled by an occasional on-air segment hosted by a Celebrity Page personality, REELZ Recommends, an email newsletter service, which highlights programs available via streaming video and video on demand.

=== Current programming ===
A list of shows currently airing.

==== Original programming ====
- Behind Closed Doors with Natalie Morales
- Behind the Screams
- Breaking the Band
- Celebrity Damage Control
- Celebrity Legacies
- Celebrity Page (formerly OK!TV)
- Charles Manson's Bloodline
- CopyCat Killers
- Demons in the City of Angels
- Executed with Deborah Norville
- Fortune Fights
- Friends Speak
- Gangsters: America's Most Evil
- Hollywood 911
- Hollywood Scandals
- How to Survive a Murder
- Kicked Out of Hollywood
- MLW Underground Wrestling
- Murder in the Family with Geraldo Rivera
- Murder Made Me Famous
- On Patrol: First Shift
- On Patrol: Live
- The Price of Fame
- The Real Story of ...
- Scandal Made Me Famous
- Serial Psyche
- The Story of the Songs (also known in the United Kingdom under the titles Whitney/Madonna/Celine Dion: The Secrets of Her Biggest Hits and Rod Stewart: The Secrets of His Biggest Hits)

==== Acquired programming ====
- The Amityville Horror Murders
- Autopsy: The Last Hours of...
- Body Cam Cops
- Caught Red Handed
- Cheating Spouses Caught on Tape
- Cops
- Cops Reloaded
- Crisis Point
- Jail
- Magic Secrets Revealed
- Mobsters
- Most Shocking
- Sheriffs of El Dorado County
- Steven Seagal: Lawman
- Untold Stories of the E.R.
- Women Behind Bars
- Women on Death Row
- World's Most Amazing Videos
- World's Most Evil Killers

=== Upcoming programming ===
- Miss Universe 2026

=== Netflix ===
- Unabomber: In His Own Words

=== Former programming ===
- 3rd Rock from the Sun
- Ally McBeal
- Becker
- Bomb Girls
- Beverly Hills Pawn
- Branson Taxi
- Brothers & Sisters
- Carson's Comedy Classics
- The Capones
- Cheers
- Celebrity Close Calls
- Celebrity Ghost Stories
- Coach
- Cold Case Files
- Cracked
- Dailies
- EP Daily
- Fan Addicts!
- Final 24
- Focus On: Movies
- Full Throttle Saloon
- Hollywood Dailies
- Hollywood Hillbillies
- Hollywood's Top Ten
- King
- Mark at the Movies
- Maltin on Movies
- Movie Mob
- Movies & Music
- Naked Trailers
- NewsRadio
- Night Court
- Pacific Blue
- Polka Kings
- Screen Machines
- Secret's Out
- Spin City
- Storage Hunters
- Treasure King
- True Justice
- The Big Tease
- The Countdown
- The Critic
- The Larry Sanders Show
- TMZ Hollywood Sports (now TMZ Sports on Fox Sports 1)
- Wings

=== Miniseries ===
- JFK: The Smoking Gun
- The Kennedys
- The Kennedys: After Camelot
- The Pillars of the Earth
- World Without End
- Aaron Hernandez's Killing Fields (2020)

=== Awards ceremonies ===
- 1st Critics' Choice Television Awards (on June 22, 2011)
- Miss USA 2015

== Other services ==
=== Reelz HD ===
Reelz HD is a high definition simulcast of Reelz broadcasting in the 720p resolution format, which launched on August 1, 2010. The first provider to carry the feed was AT&T U-verse, which began carrying ReelzChannel HD on September 27, 2010; Dish Network carried the HD feed as a free preview from March 30 to May 4, 2011. DirecTV began carrying the HD feed on September 26, 2014. DirecTV also carries ReelzChannel's video on demand content in HD. Verizon Fios began carrying the HD feed on March 25, 2017.

=== ReelzChannel In Your Room ===
Reelz formerly operated a service for hotels in partnership with LodgeNet, called ReelzChannel In Your Room. This featured a mix of Reelz's original programming with reviews and promotions of films available on a hotel's video on demand service.
