= Nash Entertainment =

American television production company

- Type: Privately held company
- Industry: Television production
- Founded: 1994; 32 years ago
- Founder: Bruce Nash
- Headquarters: Los Angeles, California, United States
- Key people: Bruce Nash (President and CEO)
- Products: Television programs
- Website: www.nashentertainment.com

Nash Entertainment is an American reality television production company founded in 1994 by Bruce Nash. The company is located at Sunset Gower Studios in Hollywood, California. It has 14 corporate employees and approximately 250 production employees.

In October 2024, the company signed a multi-title distribution deal with Shout! Studios to bring unscripted shows to streaming and other digital platforms worldwide.

== Television programs ==
Title	Years	Network	Notes
Before They Were Stars	1996	ABC	co-production with Scott Sternberg Productions
Breaking the Magician's Code: Magic's Biggest Secrets Finally Revealed	1997–1998, 2002, 2008–2009	Fox (1997–2002); MyNetworkTV (2008–2009)	co-production with Don Weiner Productions
World's Most Amazing Videos	1999–2001, 2006–2008	NBC (1999–2001); Spike TV (2006–2008)	co-production with NBC Studios
You Asked for It	2000	NBC	
I Dare You: The Ultimate Challenge	2000	UPN	
Best Kept Secrets	2000	TLC	
I-Witness	2001–2002	TLC	
Robotica	2001	TLC	
Meet My Folks	2002	NBC	
Dance Fever	2003	ABC Family	co-production with Merv Griffin Entertainment
For Better or For Worse	2003	TLC	
Head to Head	2003	Discovery Channel	
Mr. Personality	2003	Fox	
My Life is a Sitcom	2003	ABC Family	
Totally Outrageous Behavior	2003	Fox; E!	
Who Wants to Marry My Dad?	2003–2004	NBC	
For Love or Money	2003–2004	NBC	
Outback Jack	2004	TBS	
Wanna Come In?	2004–2005	MTV	
Who Wants to Be a Superhero?	2006–2007	Sci-Fi Channel	co-production with POW! Entertainment
Most Shocking	2006–2010	TruTV	
Most Daring	2007–2010	TruTV	
Amazing Sports Stories	2008	Fox Sports Net	
Crisis Point	2008	TruTV	
Top 20 Most Shocking	2009–2012	TruTV	
Moments of Impact	2009–2010	Discovery Channel	
Caught Red Handed	2012–2013	TruTV	
Clipaholics	2012	TruTV	
Top 20 Funniest	2013–2015	TruTV	

== Television specials ==
- Angels Among Us (1994)
- 50 Years of Soaps: An All-Star Celebration (1994)
- TV's All-Time Favorites (1995)
- Television's Funniest Performances (1995)
- The Secret World of Dreams (1995)
- WOW! The Most Awesome Acts on Earth (1996)
- Greatest Sports Moments of All Time (1996)
- You Gotta See This! (1996)
- Real Funny (1996)
- The World's Deadliest Volcanoes (1997)
- World's Most Daring Rescues (1997)
- Adventures with the Duchess (1997)
- World's Scariest Police Shootouts (1997)
- Behind the Laughs: The Unauthorized Stories of Television's Greatest Comedies (1998)
- Exposed! Pro Wrestling's Greatest Secrets (1998)
- When Good Pets Go Bad (1998)
- World's Deadliest Sea Creatures (1998)
- Prisoners Out of Control (1998)
- World's Worst Drivers Caught on Tape (1998)
- World's Deadliest Earthquakes (1999)
- World's Deadliest Storms (1999)
- When Good Pets Go Bad II (1999)
- World's Scariest Ghosts Caught on Tape (2000)
- The First Family's Holiday Gift to America: A Personal Tour of the White House (2000)
- Cheating Spouses Caught on Tape (2001)
- Conspiracy Theory: Did We Land on the Moon? (2001)
- Glutton Bowl (2002)
