= Caught Red Handed =

American reality television series (2012–2013)

- Genre: Reality
- Starring: Richie Mistone; Phillip Borghee; Tyson Smith; Gary Chan; Tami Ferraiuolo; Julie Custudio
- Country of origin: United States
- Original language: English
- No. of seasons: 1
- No. of episodes: 10

Production
- Executive producers: Bruce Nash; Mike Montgomery; Andrew Jebb
- Running time: 20 to 22 minutes
- Production company: Nash Entertainment

Original release
- Network: truTV
- Release: February 21, 2012 – January 22, 2013

Caught Red Handed is an American reality television series that portrays reenactments of shoplifting crimes on truTV that debuted on February 21, 2012 to January 22, 2013.

== Premise ==
Caught Red Handed takes a close look at the daily life of loss-prevention agents as they apprehend shoplifting suspects. In May 2012, the producers issued a casting call for actors to portray shoplifters on the show. At the end of each show, the credits reveal that the show consists of "reenactments inspired by true events."

== Episodes ==
No.	Title	Original release date	U.S. viewers (millions)
1	"Flemingtons"	February 21, 2012	N/A
Note: This episode was a pilot for the series.
2	"How's Supermarket"	February 21, 2012	N/A
Note: This episode was a pilot for the series.
3	"DataVision/ Over the Fence"	November 5, 2012	0.67
4	"The Rat Trap"	November 12, 2012	0.91
5	"Yellow Rat Bastard"	November 20, 2012	1.44
6	"Shell Lumber"	November 27, 2012	1.60
7	"Bolting Bandits!"	December 4, 2012	1.40
8	"Surf Style"	December 11, 2012	1.31
9	"Salzers"	December 18, 2012	1.57
10	"Garden State Wholesalers"	January 22, 2013	1.25

Note: Episodes are not broadcast in truTV episode number order.

== Lawsuit ==
truTV was sued on October 30, 2012 for allegedly stealing the idea from Harry Dunn and Steven Bloch. Despite the lawsuit, the series finished its eight-episode run. Thereafter, the show was cancelled.
