= Bruce Nash =

American reality television producer (born 1947)

- Born: August 14, 1947 (age 78); New York City, U.S.
- Education: Florida State University (BS)
- Occupation: Television producer
- Spouse: Sophie Nash (married 1967–present)
- Children: 2

Bruce Mitchell Nash (born August 14, 1947) is an American reality television producer and CEO of Nash Entertainment.

== Early start into TV ==
Nash first entered reality TV with Before They Were Stars. His credits include the Sci Fi Channel series Who Wants to Be a Superhero? with Stan Lee; World's Most Amazing Videos for NBC and Spike TV; Most Shocking, Most Daring and Top 20 Most Shocking for Court TV/truTV; Moments Of Impact for Discovery Channel; Amazing Sports Stories for Fox Sports Net, which garnered four Sports Emmy nominations; Haunted Lives: True Ghost Stories for CBS, NBC's For Love or Money; Who Wants To Marry My Dad?, ABC Family's 2003 version of Dance Fever with Merv Griffin Entertainment and Bob Bain Productions, and Meet My Folks. He is also the creator of Modern Marvels.

== Personal life ==
In May 1967, Nash married Sophie Nash and currently have two children, Robyn and Jennifer Nash.

In 2010, Nash bought a newly built house in Sherman Oaks for just over $6 million, the highest sale on record for the neighborhood at the time.
