= 2002–03 United States network television schedule =

Television schedule for the fall of 2002

The following is the 2002–03 network television schedule for the six major English language commercial broadcast networks in the United States. The schedule covers primetime hours from September 2002 through June 2003. The schedule is followed by a list per network of returning series, new series, and series cancelled after the 2001–02 season. All times are Eastern and Pacific, with certain exceptions, such as Monday Night Football.

New series are highlighted in bold.

Each of the 30 highest-rated shows is listed with its rank and rating as determined by Nielsen Media Research.

Yellow indicates the programs in the top 10 for the season.
Cyan indicates the programs in the top 20 for the season.
Magenta indicates the programs in the top 30 for the season.

Other Legend

- Light blue indicates local programming.
- Gray indicates encore programming.
- Blue-gray indicates news programming.
- Light green indicates sporting events.
- Light Purple indicates movies.
- Red indicates series being burned off and other scheduled programs, including specials.

PBS is not included; member stations have local flexibility over most of their schedules and broadcast times for network shows may vary. Also not included are stations affiliated with Pax TV, as its schedule is composed mainly of syndicated reruns although it also carried a limited schedule of first-run programs.

== Sunday ==
Network		7:00 p.m.	7:30 p.m.	8:00 p.m.	8:30 p.m.	9:00 p.m.	9:30 p.m.	10:00 p.m.	10:30 p.m.
ABC	Fall	The Wonderful World of Disney				Alias		The Practice	
ABC	Winter	The Wonderful World of Disney				Alias		**L.A. Dragnet**	
ABC	Spring	The Wonderful World of Disney				Alias		The Practice	
ABC	Summer	The Wonderful World of Disney				Alias		The Practice	
CBS	Fall	60 Minutes (17/9.6)		Becker	**Bram & Alice**	CBS Sunday Movie			
CBS	Mid-fall	60 Minutes (17/9.6)		Becker	Various programming	CBS Sunday Movie			
CBS	Winter	60 Minutes (17/9.6)		**My Big Fat Greek Life** (28/8.0)	Becker	CBS Sunday Movie			
CBS	Spring	60 Minutes (17/9.6)		Various programming		CBS Sunday Movie			
CBS	Summer	60 Minutes (17/9.6)		Becker	**Charlie Lawrence**	CBS Sunday Movie			
CBS	Mid-summer	60 Minutes (17/9.6)		Without a Trace (R)		CBS Sunday Movie			
Fox	Fall	MLB on Fox							
Fox	Mid-fall	Futurama	The Simpsons (R)	The Simpsons	King of the Hill	Malcolm in the Middle	Malcolm in the Middle (R)	Local programming	
Fox	Late fall	Futurama	King of the Hill	The Simpsons	King of the Hill	Malcolm in the Middle	Andy Richter Controls the Universe	Local programming	
Fox	Winter	Futurama	King of the Hill	The Simpsons	The Simpsons (R)	Malcolm in the Middle	Malcolm in the Middle (R)	Local programming	
Fox	Spring	Futurama	King of the Hill	The Simpsons	**Oliver Beene**	Malcolm in the Middle	**The Pitts**	Local programming	
Fox	Mid-spring	King of the Hill (R)	King of the Hill	The Simpsons	The Simpsons (R)	Malcolm in the Middle	**Oliver Beene**	Local programming	
Fox	Summer	Futurama	King of the Hill	The Simpsons	King of the Hill (R)	Malcolm in the Middle	**Oliver Beene**	Local programming	
Fox	Mid-summer	Futurama	King of the Hill	The Simpsons	**Banzai**	Malcolm in the Middle	Malcolm in the Middle (R)	Local programming	
Fox	Late summer	Futurama	**Banzai**	The Simpsons	King of the Hill (R)	Malcolm in the Middle	Malcolm in the Middle (R)	Local programming	
NBC	Fall	Dateline Sunday		**American Dreams**		Law & Order: Criminal Intent (19/9.4) (Tied with Still Standing)		**Boomtown**	
NBC	Winter	Dateline Sunday		**American Dreams**		Law & Order: Criminal Intent (19/9.4) (Tied with Still Standing)		**Kingpin**	
NBC	Spring	Dateline Sunday		**American Dreams**		Law & Order: Criminal Intent (19/9.4) (Tied with Still Standing)		**Boomtown**	
NBC	Summer	Dateline Sunday				Law & Order: Criminal Intent (19/9.4) (Tied with Still Standing)		Law & Order: Crime & Punishment	
NBC	Mid-summer	Dateline Sunday				Law & Order: Criminal Intent (19/9.4) (Tied with Still Standing)		**The Restaurant**	
NBC	Late summer	Dateline Sunday		**American Dreams**		Law & Order: Criminal Intent (19/9.4) (Tied with Still Standing)		**The Restaurant**	
The WB	Fall	Gilmore Girls (R)		Charmed		Angel		Local programming	
The WB	Winter	Gilmore Girls (R)		Charmed		**High School Reunion**		Local programming	
The WB	Spring	Gilmore Girls (R)		Charmed		**Black Sash**		Local programming	
The WB	Mid-spring	Gilmore Girls (R)		Charmed		Charmed (R)		Local programming	
The WB	Summer	Gilmore Girls (R)		Charmed		**Boarding House: North Shore** (R)		Local programming	
The WB	Mid-summer	Gilmore Girls (R)		Charmed		Charmed (R)		Local programming	

NOTE: Fox was to have aired Oliver Beene and The Grubbs on Sundays at 7:30 p.m. and 9:30 p.m., respectively, but instead made last-minute changes by postponing Oliver Beene to the following spring and canceling The Grubbs. In their places, King of the Hill and reruns of Malcolm in the Middle were slotted.

== Monday ==
Network		8:00 PM	8:30 PM	9:00 PM	9:30 PM	10:00 PM	10:30 PM
ABC	Fall	The Drew Carey Show	Whose Line Is It Anyway?	NFL Monday Showcase	Monday Night Football (10/11.4)		
ABC	Mid-fall	Special programming		NFL Monday Showcase	Monday Night Football (10/11.4)		
ABC	Late fall	Monk (R) (Note: Originally aired on USA Network)		NFL Monday Showcase	Monday Night Football (10/11.4)		
ABC	Winter	**Veritas: The Quest**		The Practice		**Miracles**	
ABC	Late winter	ABC News programming		The Practice		**Miracles**	
ABC	Spring	ABC News programming		The Practice		The Practice (R)	
ABC	Late spring	Various programming				Primetime Live: Special Edition	
ABC	Summer	ABC Sports programming					
CBS	Fall	The King of Queens (25/8.5)	Yes, Dear (24/8.6)	Everybody Loves Raymond (7/11.9) (Tied with Survivor)	**Still Standing** (19/9.4) (Tied with Law & Order: Criminal Intent)	**CSI: Miami** (11/11.0) (Tied with Will & Grace)	
CBS	Winter	The King of Queens (25/8.5)	Yes, Dear (24/8.6)	Everybody Loves Raymond (7/11.9) (Tied with Survivor)	**Still Standing** (19/9.4) (Tied with Law & Order: Criminal Intent)	**CSI: Miami** (11/11.0) (Tied with Will & Grace)	
CBS	Spring	The King of Queens (25/8.5)	Yes, Dear (24/8.6)	Everybody Loves Raymond (7/11.9) (Tied with Survivor)	**Still Standing** (19/9.4) (Tied with Law & Order: Criminal Intent)	**CSI: Miami** (11/11.0) (Tied with Will & Grace)	
CBS	Summer	Yes, Dear (R)	**Still Standing** (R)	Everybody Loves Raymond (7/11.9) (Tied with Survivor)	The King of Queens (R)	**CSI: Miami** (11/11.0) (Tied with Will & Grace)	
Fox	Fall	Special programming				Local programming	
Fox	Mid-fall	Boston Public		Special programming		Local programming	
Fox	Winter	Boston Public		**Joe Millionaire** (3/13.3)		Local programming	
Fox	Late winter	Boston Public		**Married by America**		Local programming	
Fox	Spring	Boston Public		**Mr. Personality**		Local programming	
Fox	Summer	**Anything for Love**	**Stupid Behavior Caught on Tape** (R)	**Paradise Hotel**		Local programming	
Fox	Mid-summer	**The O.C.** (R)		**Paradise Hotel**		Local programming	
NBC	Fall	Fear Factor (30/7.7)		Third Watch		Crossing Jordan	
NBC	Winter	Fear Factor (30/7.7)		Third Watch		Crossing Jordan	
NBC	Spring	Fear Factor (30/7.7)		Third Watch		Crossing Jordan	
NBC	Summer	Fear Factor (30/7.7)		**For Love or Money**		**Who Wants to Marry My Dad?**	
UPN		The Parkers	One on One	Girlfriends	**Half & Half**	Local programming	
The WB	Fall	7th Heaven		**Everwood**		Local programming	
The WB	Winter	7th Heaven		**Everwood**		Local programming	
The WB	Spring	7th Heaven		**Everwood**		Local programming	
The WB	Summer	7th Heaven (R)				Local programming	

== Tuesday ==
Network		8:00 PM	8:30 PM	9:00 PM	9:30 PM	10:00 PM	10:30 PM
ABC	Fall	**8 Simple Rules... for Dating My Teenage Daughter**	According to Jim	**Life with Bonnie**	**Less than Perfect**	NYPD Blue (#29/7.8)	
ABC	Spring	**8 Simple Rules... for Dating My Teenage Daughter**	According to Jim	According to Jim	**Lost at Home**	NYPD Blue (#29/7.8)	
ABC	Follow Up	**8 Simple Rules... for Dating My Teenage Daughter**	According to Jim	According to Jim	**Less than Perfect**	NYPD Blue (#29/7.8)	
ABC	Summer	**8 Simple Rules... for Dating My Teenage Daughter**	**8 Simple Rules... for Dating My Teenage Daughter**	According to Jim	**Less than Perfect**	NYPD Blue (#29/7.8)	
ABC	Mid-Summer	**8 Simple Rules... for Dating My Teenage Daughter**	**Life with Bonnie**	According to Jim	**Less than Perfect**	NYPD Blue (#29/7.8)	
CBS	Fall	JAG (#22/8.9)		The Guardian (#27/8.3)		Judging Amy (#18/9.5)	
CBS	Winter	JAG (#22/8.9)		The Guardian (#27/8.3)		Judging Amy (#18/9.5)	
CBS	Spring	JAG (#22/8.9)		The Guardian (#27/8.3)		Judging Amy (#18/9.5)	
CBS	Summer	JAG (#22/8.9)		The Guardian (#27/8.3)		Judging Amy (#18/9.5)	
CBS	Mid-Summer	Big Brother		**Cupid**		Judging Amy (#18/9.5)	
Fox	Fall	That '70s Show	Grounded for Life	Various Specials		Local Programming	
Fox	Follow Up	MLB on FOX					
Fox	Late Fall	That '70s Show	That '70s Show (Repeats)	24		Local Programming	
Fox	December	That '70s Show	Andy Richter Controls the Universe	24		Local Programming	
Fox	Winter	American Idol (#5/12.6)		24		Local Programming	
Fox	Summer	**American Juniors**		**Keen Eddie**		Local Programming	
Fox	Mid-Summer	**American Juniors**		**The O.C.**		Local Programming	
Fox	Late Summer	**Performing As...**		**The O.C.**		Local Programming	
NBC	Fall	Just Shoot Me!	**In-Laws**	Frasier (#26/8.4)	**Hidden Hills**	Dateline NBC	
NBC	Winter	**In-Laws**	Just Shoot Me!	Frasier (#26/8.4)	**A.U.S.A.**	**Kingpin**	
NBC	March	**Let's Make a Deal**		Frasier (#26/8.4)	**A.U.S.A.**	Dateline NBC	
NBC	Follow Up	Just Shoot Me!	**Good Morning Miami**	Frasier (#26/8.4)	Watching Ellie	Dateline NBC	
NBC	Summer	Dog Eat Dog		**Last Comic Standing**		Dateline NBC	
NBC	Mid-Summer	Dog Eat Dog		**Last Comic Standing**		Law & Order: Special Victims Unit	
UPN	Fall	Buffy the Vampire Slayer		**Haunted**		Local Programming	
UPN	November	Buffy the Vampire Slayer		Girlfriends (Repeats)	Various Comedy Encores	Local Programming	
UPN	Winter	Buffy the Vampire Slayer		**Abby**	Girlfriends (Repeats)	Local Programming	
UPN	March	Buffy the Vampire Slayer		Various Comedy & Drama Encores		Local Programming	
UPN	Spring	Buffy the Vampire Slayer		**Platinum**		Local Programming	
UPN	Follow Up	Buffy the Vampire Slayer		**America's Next Top Model**		Local Programming	
UPN	Summer	**America's Next Top Model** (Repeats)		**America's Next Top Model**		Local Programming	
UPN	Mid-Summer	One on One	**Abby**	Buffy the Vampire Slayer		Local Programming	
The WB		Gilmore Girls		Smallville		Local Programming	

NOTE: Grounded for Life was also originally scheduled to run on Tuesdays at 8:30 p.m. on Fox, but it was pulled after two new episodes in September, and one in early December. The show moved to The WB in the spring in 2003.

== Wednesday ==
Network		8:00 PM	8:30 PM	9:00 PM	9:30 PM	10:00 PM	10:30 PM
ABC	Fall	My Wife & Kids	George Lopez	The Bachelor (#16/9.9)		**MDs**	
ABC	Follow Up	My Wife & Kids	George Lopez	The Bachelor (#16/9.9)		Various ABC News Programs	
ABC	December	My Wife & Kids	George Lopez	**Extreme Makeover**		Various ABC News Programs	
ABC	January	My Wife & Kids	George Lopez	**The Bachelorette** (#16/9.9)		The Mole	
ABC	Mid-February	My Wife & Kids	George Lopez	**I'm a Celebrity...Get Me Out of Here!**		Various Specials	
ABC	Spring	My Wife & Kids	George Lopez	The Bachelor (#16/9.9)		**All American Girl**	
ABC	Late April	My Wife & Kids	George Lopez	The Bachelor (#16/9.9)		**Extreme Makeover**	
ABC	Summer	My Wife & Kids	George Lopez	The Drew Carey Show	The Drew Carey Show	**The Dating Experiment**	
ABC	August	My Wife & Kids	George Lopez	**The Real Roseanne Show**		**The Family**	
ABC	Follow Up	My Wife & Kids	George Lopez	George Lopez	The Drew Carey Show	**The Family**	
CBS	Fall	60 Minutes II		The Amazing Race		**Presidio Med**	
CBS	Winter	**Star Search**		60 Minutes II		48 Hours Investigates	
CBS	Spring	**Star Search**		60 Minutes II		48 Hours Investigates	
CBS	June	Various Specials		60 Minutes II		48 Hours Investigates	
CBS	Mid-Summer	60 Minutes II		Big Brother		**Cupid**	
CBS	Late summer	60 Minutes II		Big Brother		48 Hours Investigates	
Fox	Fall	The Bernie Mac Show	**Cedric the Entertainer Presents**	**Fastlane**		Local Programming	
Fox	Winter	That '70s Show	American Idol (#6/12.5)	The Bernie Mac Show	**Cedric the Entertainer Presents**	Local Programming	
Fox	Spring	That '70s Show	American Idol (#6/12.5)		**Wanda at Large**	Local Programming	
Fox	Follow Up	That '70s Show	American Idol (#6/12.5)	The Bernie Mac Show	**Wanda at Large**	Local Programming	
Fox	Summer	That '70s Show	**American Juniors**	**Paradise Hotel**		Local Programming	
NBC	Fall	Ed		The West Wing (#21/9.0)		Law & Order (#9/11.7)	
NBC	Winter	Ed		The West Wing (#21/9.0)		Law & Order (#9/11.7)	
NBC	Spring	Dateline NBC		The West Wing (#21/9.0)		Law & Order (#9/11.7)	
NBC	Summer	**Fame**		Law & Order		Law & Order (#9/11.7)	
NBC	Mid-Summer	**Race to the Altar**		The West Wing (#21/9.0)		Law & Order (#9/11.7)	
UPN		Star Trek: Enterprise		**The Twilight Zone**		Local Programming	
The WB	Fall	Dawson's Creek		**Birds of Prey**		Local Programming	
The WB	Winter	Dawson's Creek		Angel		Local Programming	
The WB	Spring	Dawson's Creek		Angel		Local Programming	
The WB	Summer	**Boarding House: North Shore**		The Jamie Kennedy Experiment	The Jamie Kennedy Experiment	Local Programming	
The WB	Mid-Summer	Smallville		**Pepsi Smash**		Local Programming	

== Thursday ==
Network		8:00 p.m.	8:30 p.m.	9:00 p.m.	9:30 p.m.	10:00 p.m.	10:30 p.m.
ABC	Fall	Monk (R) (Note: Originally aired on USA Network)		**Push, Nevada**		Primetime Thursday	
ABC	Late fall	**Dinotopia**		Special programming		Primetime Thursday	
ABC	Winter	Special programming				Primetime Thursday	
ABC	Mid-winter	**Profiles from the Front Line**		**Are You Hot?: The Search for America's Sexiest People**		Primetime Thursday	
ABC	Spring	Special programming				Primetime Thursday	
ABC	Mid-spring	NBA on ABC					
ABC	Late spring	ABC Thursday Night Movie				Primetime Thursday	
ABC	Summer	Various programming				Primetime Thursday	
CBS	Fall	Survivor: Thailand (7/11.9) (Tied with Everybody Loves Raymond)		CSI: Crime Scene Investigation (1/16.3)		**Without a Trace** (15/10.0)	
CBS	Winter	**Star Search**		CSI: Crime Scene Investigation (1/16.3)		**Without a Trace** (15/10.0)	
CBS	Mid-winter	Survivor: The Amazon (7/11.9) (Tied with Everybody Loves Raymond)		CSI: Crime Scene Investigation (1/16.3)		**Without a Trace** (15/10.0)	
CBS	Spring	The Amazing Race		CSI: Crime Scene Investigation (1/16.3)		**Without a Trace** (15/10.0)	
Fox	Fall	MLB on Fox					
Fox	Mid-fall	30 Seconds to Fame		Special programming		Local programming	
Fox	Late fall	Fox Thursday Night Movie				Local programming	
Fox	Winter	**Joe Millionaire** (R)		The Pulse		Local programming	
Fox	Spring	Various programming		The Pulse		Local programming	
Fox	Late spring	**Stupid Behavior Caught on Tape**	30 Seconds to Fame	The Pulse		Local programming	
Fox	Summer	Various programming		Temptation Island		Local programming	
NBC	Fall	Friends (2/13.9)	Scrubs (13/10.3)	Will & Grace (11/11.0) (Tied with CSI: Miami)	**Good Morning, Miami** (23/8.7)	ER (4/13.1)	
NBC	Winter	Friends (2/13.9)	Scrubs (13/10.3)	Will & Grace (11/11.0) (Tied with CSI: Miami)	**Good Morning, Miami** (23/8.7)	ER (4/13.1)	
NBC	Spring	Friends (2/13.9)	Scrubs (13/10.3)	Will & Grace (11/11.0) (Tied with CSI: Miami)	Frasier (R)	ER (4/13.1)	
UPN		WWE SmackDown!				Local programming	
The WB	Fall	**Family Affair**	**Do Over**	The Jamie Kennedy Experiment	Off Centre	Local programming	
The WB	Late fall	**Family Affair**	**Do Over**	The Jamie Kennedy Experiment	The Jamie Kennedy Experiment (R)	Local programming	
The WB	Winter	**High School Reunion** (Repeats)		**The Surreal Life**	The Jamie Kennedy Experiment	Local programming	
The WB	Late winter	Sabrina the Teenage Witch	**Family Affair**	The Jamie Kennedy Experiment (R)		Local programming	
The WB	Spring	Sabrina the Teenage Witch	Various programming	The Jamie Kennedy Experiment	**On the Spot**	Local programming	
The WB	Mid-spring	The WB Thursday Night Movie				Local programming	
The WB	Late spring	Various programming	**The O'Keefes**	The Jamie Kennedy Experiment (R)		Local programming	
The WB	Summer	The WB Thursday Night Movie				Local programming	

NOTE: Movies, baseball games, reruns, and specials comprised most of the programming Thursday nights on Fox. Septuplets was supposed to air at 9-10, but it was cancelled at the last minute.

== Friday ==
Network		8:00 PM	8:30 PM	9:00 PM	9:30 PM	10:00 PM	10:30 PM
ABC	Fall	America's Funniest Home Videos		Various programming		20/20	
ABC	Mid-fall	America's Funniest Home Videos		Whose Line Is It Anyway?	The Drew Carey Show	20/20	
ABC	Spring	America's Funniest Home Videos		**8 Simple Rules... for Dating My Teenage Daughter** (R)	**Regular Joe**	20/20	
ABC	Mid-spring	America's Funniest Home Videos		America's Funniest Home Videos (R)		20/20	
ABC	Summer	America's Funniest Home Videos		Whose Line Is It Anyway?		20/20	
CBS	Fall	48 Hours		**Hack**		**Robbery Homicide Division**	
CBS	Late fall	48 Hours		**Hack**		Special programming	
CBS	Winter	**Star Search**		**Hack**		48 Hours	
CBS	Spring	Baby Bob	Yes, Dear (R)	**Hack**		48 Hours	
CBS	Summer	Big Brother		JAG (R)		48 Hours	
Fox	Fall	**Firefly**		**John Doe**		Local programming	
Fox	Winter	**Fastlane**		**John Doe**		Local programming	
Fox	Spring	**Fastlane**		**John Doe**		Local programming	
Fox	Summer	The Bernie Mac Show (R)	**Wanda at Large** (R)	Boston Public (R)		Local programming	
NBC	Fall	Providence		Dateline Friday		Law & Order: Special Victims Unit (14/10.1)	
NBC	Winter	**Mister Sterling**		Dateline Friday		Law & Order: Special Victims Unit (14/10.1)	
NBC	Spring	**America's Most Talented Kid**		Ed		Law & Order: Special Victims Unit (14/10.1)	
NBC	Mid-spring	Dateline Friday				Law & Order: Special Victims Unit (14/10.1)	
UPN		UPN's Night at the Movies				Local programming	
The WB	Fall	**What I Like About You**	Sabrina the Teenage Witch	Reba	**Greetings from Tucson**	Local programming	
The WB	Winter	**What I Like About You**	Sabrina the Teenage Witch	Reba	Grounded for Life	Local programming	
The WB	Spring	**What I Like About You**	**Greetings from Tucson**	Reba	Grounded for Life	Local programming	

== Saturday ==
Network		8:00 p.m.	8:30 p.m.	9:00 p.m.	9:30 p.m.	10:00 p.m.	10:30 p.m.
ABC		ABC Saturday Movie of the Week					
CBS		Touched by an Angel		The District		The Agency	
Fox		COPS	COPS (R)	America's Most Wanted: America Fights Back		Local programming	
NBC	Fall	NBC Saturday Night Movie					
NBC	Winter	Law & Order (R)		Law & Order: Criminal Intent (R)		Law & Order: Special Victims Unit (R)	
NBC	Spring	**Hunter**		Law & Order (R)		Law & Order: Special Victims Unit (R)	
NBC	Late spring	NBC Saturday Night Movie					
NBC	Summer	Just Shoot Me!		NBC Saturday Night Movie			

== By network ==
=== ABC ===
**Returning series**

- 20/20
- ABC Saturday Movie of the Week
- ABC Thursday Night Movie
- According to Jim
- Alias
- America's Funniest Home Videos
- The Bachelor
- The Drew Carey Show
- George Lopez
- The Mole
- Monday Night Football
- Monk
- My Wife and Kids
- NYPD Blue
- The Practice
- Primetime
- Whose Line is it Anyway?
- The Wonderful World of Disney

**New series**

- **8 Simple Rules for Dating My Teenage Daughter**
- **Are You Hot?: The Search for America's Sexiest People** *
- **The Bachelorette**
- **The Dating Experiment** *
- **Dinotopia**
- **Extreme Makeover** *
- **The Family** *
- **I'm a Celebrity...Get Me Out of Here** *
- **L.A. Dragnet** *
- **Less than Perfect**
- **Life with Bonnie**
- **Lost at Home** *
- **MDs**
- **Miracles**
- **Profiles from the Front Line** *
- **Push, Nevada**
- **The Real Roseanne Show** *
- **Regular Joe** *
- **That Was Then**
- **Veritas: The Quest** *

Not returning from 2001–02:

- ABC Big Picture Show
- The ABC Monday Night Movie
- Bob Patterson
- The Chair
- The Court
- Dharma & Greg
- Houston Medical
- The Job
- Once and Again
- Philly
- Spin City
- Thieves
- Vanished
- The Wayne Brady Show
- Wednesday 9:30 (8:30 Central)
- What About Joan?
- Who Wants to Be a Millionaire (moved to syndication)
- Widows

=== CBS ===
**Returning series**

- 48 Hours
- 60 Minutes
- 60 Minutes II
- The Agency
- The Amazing Race
- Baby Bob
- Becker
- Big Brother
- CBS Sunday Movie
- CSI: Crime Scene Investigation
- The District
- Everybody Loves Raymond
- The Guardian
- JAG
- Judging Amy
- The King of Queens
- Survivor
- Touched by an Angel
- Yes, Dear

**New series**

- **Bram & Alice**
- **Charlie Lawrence** *
- **CSI: Miami**
- **Hack**
- **My Big Fat Greek Life** *
- **Presidio Med**
- **Queens Supreme** *
- **Robbery Homicide Division**
- **Star Search** *
- **Still Standing**
- **Without a Trace**

Not returning from 2001–02:

- Citizen Baines
- Danny
- The Education of Max Bickford
- The Ellen Show
- Family Law
- First Monday
- That's Life
- Wolf Lake

=== Fox ===
**Returning series**

- 24
- 30 Seconds to Fame
- American Idol
- America's Most Wanted: America Fights Back
- Andy Richter Controls the Universe
- The Bernie Mac Show
- Boston Public
- Cops
- Fox Thursday Night Movie
- Futurama
- King of the Hill
- Malcolm in the Middle
- The Pulse
- The Simpsons
- Temptation Island
- That '70s Show
- Totally Outrageous Behavior

**New series**

- **American Juniors** *
- **Anything for Love** *
- **Banzai!** *
- **Cedric the Entertainer Presents**
- **Fastlane**
- **Firefly**
- **Girls Club**
- **Joe Millionaire** *
- **John Doe**
- **Keen Eddie** *
- **Married by America** *
- **Mr. Personality** *
- **Oliver Beene** *
- **Paradise Hotel** *
- **Performing As...** *
- **The Pitts** *
- **Stupid Behavior Caught on Tape** *
- **Wanda at Large** *

Not returning from 2001–02:

- Ally McBeal
- The American Embassy
- Beyond Belief: Fact or Fiction
- The Chamber
- Dark Angel
- Family Guy (returned for 2004-05)
- Greg the Bunny
- Grounded for Life (moved to The WB)
- Guinness World Records Primetime
- Looking for Love: Bachelorettes in Alaska
- Love Cruise
- Meet the Marks
- Pasadena
- That '80s Show
- The Tick
- Titus
- Undeclared
- World's Wildest Police Videos
- The X-Files (returned for 2015-16)

=== NBC ===
**Returning series**

- Crossing Jordan
- Dateline NBC
- Dog Eat Dog
- Ed
- ER
- Fear Factor
- Frasier
- Friends
- Just Shoot Me!
- Law & Order
- Law & Order: Criminal Intent
- Law & Order: Special Victims Unit
- Meet My Folks
- Providence
- Scrubs
- Third Watch
- Watching Ellie
- The West Wing
- Will & Grace

**New series**

- **America's Most Talented Kid** *
- **American Dreams**
- **A.U.S.A.** *
- **Boomtown**
- **Fame** *
- **Good Morning, Miami**
- **For Love or Money** *
- **Hidden Hills**
- **Hunter** *
- **In-Laws**
- **Kingpin** *
- **Last Comic Standing** *
- **Let's Make a Deal** *
- **Mister Sterling** *
- **Race to the Altar** *
- **The Restaurant** *
- **Who Wants to Marry My Dad?** *

Not returning from 2001–02:

- Emeril
- Imagine That
- Inside Schwartz
- Leap of Faith
- Lost
- The Rerun Show
- Spy TV
- Three Sisters
- UC: Undercover
- The Weakest Link (returned for 2020-21)

=== UPN ===
**Returning series**

- Buffy the Vampire Slayer
- Girlfriends
- One on One
- The Parkers
- Star Trek: Enterprise
- UPN's Night at the Movies
- WWE SmackDown!

**New series**

- **Abby** *
- **America's Next Top Model** *
- **Half & Half**
- **Haunted**
- **Platinum** *
- **The Twilight Zone**

Not returning from 2001–02:

- As If
- The Hughleys
- The Random Years
- Roswell
- Under One Roof

=== The WB ===
**Returning series**

- 7th Heaven
- Angel
- Charmed
- Dawson’s Creek
- Flix From the Frog
- Gilmore Girls
- Grounded for Life (moved from FOX)
- The Jamie Kennedy Experiment
- Off Centre
- Reba
- Sabrina the Teenage Witch
- Smallville

**New series**

- **Birds of Prey**
- **Black Sash** *
- **Boarding House: North Shore** *
- **Do Over**
- **Everwood**
- **Family Affair**
- **Greetings from Tucson**
- **High School Reunion** *
- **The O'Keefes** *
- **On the Spot** *
- **Pepsi Smash** *
- **The Surreal Life** *
- **What I Like About You**

Not returning from 2001–02:

- Elimidate Deluxe
- Felicity
- For Your Love
- Glory Days
- Maybe It's Me
- Men, Women & Dogs
- My Guide to Becoming a Rock Star
- Nikki
- Popstars USA
- Raising Dad
- Ripley's Believe It or Not!
- The Steve Harvey Show

Note: The * indicates that the program was introduced in midseason.

== Renewals and cancellations ==
=== Renewals ===
==== ABC ====
- 8 Simple Rules—Renewed for the 2003–2004 season.
- According to Jim—Renewed for the 2003–2004 season.
- Alias—Renewed for the 2003–2004 season.
- Dragnet—Renewed for the 2003–2004 season.
- The Drew Carey Show—Renewed for the 2003–2004 season.
- George Lopez—Renewed for the 2003–2004 season.
- Less than Perfect—Renewed for the 2003–2004 season.
- Life with Bonnie—Renewed for the 2003–2004 season.
- My Wife and Kids—Renewed for the 2003–2004 season.
- NYPD Blue—Renewed for the 2003–2004 season.
- The Practice—Renewed for the 2003–2004 season.

==== CBS ====
- Becker—Renewed for the 2003–2004 season.
- CSI: Crime Scene Investigation—Renewed for the 2003–2004 season.
- CSI: Miami—Renewed for the 2003–2004 season.
- The District—Renewed for the 2003–2004 season.
- Everybody Loves Raymond—Renewed for the 2003–2004 season.
- The Guardian—Renewed for the 2003–2004 season.
- Hack—Renewed for the 2003–2004 season.
- JAG—Renewed for the 2003–2004 season.
- Judging Amy—Renewed for the 2003–2004 season.
- The King of Queens—Renewed for the 2003–2004 season.
- Still Standing—Renewed for the 2003–2004 season.
- Without a Trace—Renewed for the 2003–2004 season.
- Yes, Dear—Renewed for the 2003–2004 season.

==== Fox ====
- 24—Renewed for the 2003–2004 season.
- The Bernie Mac Show—Renewed for the 2003–2004 season.
- Boston Public—Renewed for the 2003–2004 season.
- Futurama
- King of the Hill—Renewed for the 2003–2004 season.
- Malcolm in the Middle—Renewed for the 2003–2004 season.
- Oliver Beene—Renewed for the 2003–2004 season.
- The Simpsons—Renewed for the 2003–2004 season.
- That '70s Show—Renewed for the 2003–2004 season.
- Wanda at Large—Renewed for the 2003–2004 season.

==== NBC ====
- American Dreams—Renewed for the 2003–2004 season.
- Boomtown—Renewed for the 2003–2004 season.
- Crossing Jordan—Renewed for the 2003–2004 season.
- Ed—Renewed for the 2003–2004 season.
- ER—Renewed for the 2003–2004 season.
- Frasier—Renewed for the 2003–2004 season.
- Friends—Renewed for the 2003–2004 season.
- Good Morning, Miami—Renewed for the 2003–2004 season.
- Law & Order—Renewed for the 2003–2004 season.
- Law & Order: Criminal Intent—Renewed for the 2003–2004 season.
- Law & Order: Special Victims Unit—Renewed for the 2003–2004 season.
- Scrubs—Renewed for the 2003–2004 season.
- Third Watch—Renewed for the 2003–2004 season.
- The West Wing—Renewed for the 2003–2004 season.
- Will & Grace—Renewed for the 2003–2004 season.

==== UPN ====
- Girlfriends—Renewed for the 2003–2004 season.
- Half & Half—Renewed for the 2003–2004 season.
- One on One—Renewed for the 2003–2004 season.
- The Parkers—Renewed for the 2003–2004 season.
- Star Trek: Enterprise—Renewed for the 2003–2004 season.

==== The WB ====
- 7th Heaven—Renewed for the 2003–2004 season.
- Angel—Renewed for the 2003–2004 season.
- Charmed—Renewed for the 2003–2004 season.
- Everwood—Renewed for the 2003–2004 season.
- Gilmore Girls—Renewed for the 2003–2004 season.
- Grounded for Life—Renewed for the 2003–2004 season.
- Reba—Renewed for the 2003–2004 season.
- Smallville—Renewed for the 2003–2004 season.
- What I Like About You—Renewed for the 2003–2004 season.

=== Cancellations/series endings ===
==== ABC ====
- Lost at Home—Canceled after one season. Gregory Hines died on August 9, 2003, at the age of 57.
- MDs—Canceled after one season.
- Miracles—Canceled after one season.
- Regular Joe—Canceled after one season.
- That Was Then—Canceled after one season.

==== CBS ====
- The Agency—Canceled after two seasons.
- Baby Bob—Canceled after two seasons.
- Bram & Alice—Canceled after one season.
- Charlie Lawrence—Canceled after one season.
- My Big Fat Greek Life—Canceled after one season.
- Presidio Med—Canceled after one season.
- Queens Supreme—Canceled after one season.
- Robbery Homicide Division—Canceled after one season.
- Touched by an Angel—Ended after nine seasons.

==== Fox ====
- Andy Richter Controls the Universe—Canceled after two seasons.
- Fastlane—Canceled after one season.
- Firefly—Canceled after one season.
- Girls Club—Canceled after one season.
- John Doe—Canceled after one season.
- Keen Eddie—Canceled after one season.
- Paradise Hotel—Revived for the 2018–2019 season.
- The Pitts—Canceled after one season.
- Temptation Island—Moved to USA in 2019.

==== NBC ====
- A.U.S.A.—Canceled after one season.
- Hidden Hills—Canceled after one season.
- Hunter—Canceled after one season.
- In-Laws—Canceled after one season.
- Just Shoot Me!—Ended after seven seasons. The final 3 episodes of Just Shoot Me! aired in syndication from November 24, 2003, until November 26, 2003.
- Kingpin—Canceled after one season.
- Mister Sterling—Canceled after one season.
- Providence—Ended after five seasons.
- Watching Ellie—Canceled after two seasons.

==== UPN ====
- Abby—Canceled after one season.
- Buffy the Vampire Slayer—Ended after seven seasons.
- Haunted—Canceled after one season.
- Platinum—Canceled after one season.
- The Twilight Zone—Canceled after one season.

==== The WB ====
- Birds of Prey—Canceled after one season.
- Black Sash—Canceled after one season.
- Dawson's Creek—Ended after six seasons.
- Do Over—Canceled after one season.
- Family Affair—Canceled after one season.
- Greetings from Tucson—Canceled after one season.
- The O'Keefes—Canceled after one season.
- On the Spot—Canceled after one season.
- Off Centre—Canceled after two seasons.
- Sabrina the Teenage Witch—Ended after seven seasons.
