= 2001–02 United States network television schedule =

Television schedule for the fall of 2001

The 2001–02 network television schedule for the six major English language commercial broadcast networks in the United States covers the primetime hours from September 2001 to August 2002. The schedule is followed by a list per network of returning series, new series, and series canceled after the 2000–01 season.

PBS is not included; member stations have local flexibility over most of their schedules and broadcasts times for network shows may vary. Also not included are stations affiliated with Pax TV, as its schedule is composed mainly of syndicated reruns although it also carried a limited schedule of first-run programs.

Each of the 30 highest-rated shows released in May 2002 is listed with its rank and rating as determined by Nielsen Media Research.

From February 8 to 24, 2002, all of NBC's primetime programming was preempted in favor of coverage of the 2002 Winter Olympics in Salt Lake City.

== Impact of the September 11 attacks ==
During the week of September 11, 2001, the major television networks aired continuous news coverage of the September 11 attacks. The news coverage preempted the networks' primetime schedules between September 11 and September 15, with regular programming resuming on September 16. As a result of the preemptions, the programs that were set to begin airing new seasons in mid-September had their premieres delayed until late September and early October. The Amazing Race was the first program to premiere in the 2001–02 season; the show's first season premiered on September 5, but had its second episode postponed from September 12 to September 19 due to the aforementioned news coverage. As a result of the scheduling oddities that were necessitated by the news coverage, the 2001–02 season was the second of four instances where the start of the season was delayed due to issues outside of the control of the major television networks; the other instances were the 1988–89 season (due to the 1988 Writers Guild of America strike), the 2020–21 season (due to a suspension of television productions as a result of the COVID-19 pandemic), and the 2023–24 season (due to a series of strikes that affected both the Writers Guild of America and SAG-AFTRA). The next major disruption to the primetime television schedules of the major television networks would not occur until the 2007–08 season, which was affected by the 2007–08 Writers Guild of America strike.

The 53rd Primetime Emmy Awards, which were planned for September 16, were initially postponed to October 7, but news coverage of the United States invasion of Afghanistan prompted the awards to be postponed for a second time; the awards would be eventually held on November 4.

== Legend ==
- Light blue indicates local programming.
- Gray indicates encore programming.
- Blue-gray indicates news programming.
- Light green indicates sporting events.
- Red indicates series being burned off and other irregularly scheduled programs, including specials and movies.
- Bronze indicates reruns of programming that originally aired on a cable channel.
- highlight Yellow highlights indicates the top-10 most watched programs of the season.
- highlight Cyan highlights indicates numbers 11-20 most watched programs of the season.
- highlight Magenta highlights indicates numbers 21-30 most watched programs of the season.
- highlight Highlights indicates that it falls in multiple of the above categories.

== Schedule ==
- New series to broadcast television are highlighted in **bold**.
- Repeat airings or same-day rebroadcasts are indicated by **(R)**.
- All times are U.S. Eastern and Pacific Time (except for some live sports or events). Subtract one hour for Central, Mountain, Alaska, and Hawaii–Aleutian times.
- All sporting events air live in all time zones in U.S. Eastern time, with local and/or late-night programming scheduled by affiliates after game completion.

== Sunday ==
Network		7:00 p.m.	7:30 p.m.	8:00 p.m.	8:30 p.m.	9:00 p.m.	9:30 p.m.	10:00 p.m.	10:30 p.m.
ABC		The Wonderful World of Disney				**Alias**		The Practice (23/8.3) (Tied with NYPD Blue)	
CBS	Fall	60 Minutes (13/10.1)		**The Education of Max Bickford**		CBS Sunday Movie			
CBS	Spring	60 Minutes (13/10.1)		Touched by an Angel (R)		CBS Sunday Movie			
CBS	Summer	60 Minutes (13/10.1)		Everybody Loves Raymond (R)	Becker (R)	CBS Sunday Movie			
Fox	Fall	Futurama	King of the Hill	The Simpsons	Malcolm in the Middle	The X-Files		Local programming	
Fox	Summer	Futurama	King of the Hill	The Simpsons	Malcolm in the Middle	**Looking for Love:** **Bachelorettes in Alaska**		Local programming	
Fox	Late summer	Futurama	King of the Hill	The Simpsons	King of the Hill (R)	Malcolm in the Middle (R)		Local programming	
NBC	Fall	Dateline NBC		The Weakest Link		**Law & Order: Criminal Intent** (27/7.9) (Tied with Fear Factor and Providence)		**UC: Undercover**	
NBC	Winter	Dateline NBC		The Weakest Link		**Law & Order: Criminal Intent** (27/7.9) (Tied with Fear Factor and Providence)		**UC: Undercover**	
NBC	Spring	NBA on NBC		The Weakest Link		**Law & Order: Criminal Intent** (27/7.9) (Tied with Fear Factor and Providence)		Various programming	
NBC	Late spring	Dateline NBC		The Weakest Link		**Law & Order: Criminal Intent** (27/7.9) (Tied with Fear Factor and Providence)		**Law & Order: Crime & Punishment**	
NBC	Summer	Dateline NBC		Various programming		**Law & Order: Criminal Intent** (27/7.9) (Tied with Fear Factor and Providence)		**Law & Order: Crime & Punishment**	
The WB	Fall	**Ripley's Believe It or Not!** (R)		The Steve Harvey Show	**Men, Women & Dogs**	Nikki	**Off Centre**	Local programming	
The WB	Mid-fall	**Ripley's Believe It or Not!** (R)		The Steve Harvey Show	**Men, Women & Dogs**	**Off Centre**	Nikki	Local programming	
The WB	Late fall	**Ripley's Believe It or Not!** (R)		The Steve Harvey Show	Nikki	**Off Centre**	**Men, Women & Dogs**	Local programming	
The WB	Winter	The Steve Harvey Show (R)	The Steve Harvey Show	**The Jamie Kennedy Experiment**	Nikki	**Off Centre**	For Your Love	Local programming	
The WB	Late winter	**No Boundaries**		**The Jamie Kennedy Experiment**	**The Jamie Kennedy Experiment** (R)	**Off Centre**	For Your Love	Local programming	
The WB	Spring	Flix from the Frog				**The Jamie Kennedy Experiment**	**Off Centre**	Local programming	
The WB	Late spring	Flix from the Frog				Angel (R)		Local programming	
The WB	Summer	For Your Love (R)		Charmed (R)		Angel (R)		Local programming	
The WB	Mid-summer	Charmed (R)				Angel (R)		Local programming	

NOTE: Fox aired 2 episodes of The Chamber in mid-January 2002. During the fall, Futurama and King of the Hill were preempted by overruns of NFL games. On The WB, Lost in the USA was supposed to air at 7–8, but it was cancelled due to 9/11 problems.

== Monday ==
Network		8:00 p.m.	8:30 p.m.	9:00 p.m.	9:30 p.m.	10:00 p.m.	10:30 p.m.
ABC	Fall	Who Wants to Be a Millionaire		NFL Monday Showcase	Monday Night Football (7/11.5)		
ABC	Winter	Who Wants to Be a Millionaire		The ABC Monday Night Movie			
ABC	Spring	America's Funniest Home Videos (R)		**The Bachelor**		Once and Again	
ABC	Mid-spring	The ABC Monday Night Movie					
ABC	Summer	Special programming					
CBS	Fall	The King of Queens (19/8.9)	Yes, Dear (20/8.8) (Tied with Crossing Jordan)	Everybody Loves Raymond (4/12.8)	Becker (11/10.7)	Family Law (30/7.7) (Tied with 60 Minutes II)	
CBS	Winter	Yes, Dear (20/8.8) (Tied with Crossing Jordan)	**Baby Bob** (25/8.1) (Tied with Dateline NBC)	Everybody Loves Raymond (4/12.8)	Becker (11/10.7)	Family Law (30/7.7) (Tied with 60 Minutes II)	
CBS	Spring	The King of Queens (19/8.9)	Yes, Dear (20/8.8) (Tied with Crossing Jordan)	Everybody Loves Raymond (4/12.8)	Becker (11/10.7)	48 Hours	
Fox	Fall	Boston Public		Ally McBeal		Local programming	
Fox	Winter	Boston Public		**The American Embassy**		Local programming	
Fox	Spring	Boston Public		Ally McBeal		Local programming	
Fox	Summer	Boston Public		Titus		Local programming	
Fox	Mid-summer	Boston Public (R)				Local programming	
NBC	Fall	The Weakest Link		Dateline NBC		**Crossing Jordan** (20/8.8) (Tied with Yes, Dear)	
NBC	Mid-fall	The Weakest Link		Third Watch		**Crossing Jordan** (20/8.8) (Tied with Yes, Dear)	
NBC	Winter	Fear Factor (27/7.9) (Tied with Law & Order: Criminal Intent and Providence)		Third Watch		**Crossing Jordan** (20/8.8) (Tied with Yes, Dear)	
NBC	Spring	Fear Factor (27/7.9) (Tied with Law & Order: Criminal Intent and Providence)		**Dog Eat Dog**		**Crossing Jordan** (20/8.8) (Tied with Yes, Dear)	
NBC	Summer	Fear Factor (27/7.9) (Tied with Law & Order: Criminal Intent and Providence)		**Dog Eat Dog**		**Meet My Folks**	
UPN		The Hughleys	**One on One**	The Parkers	Girlfriends	Local programming	
The WB		7th Heaven		Angel		Local programming	

- Note: ABC's The Runner was planned to launch after the end of the NFL season, but production was shut down post-9/11 because of new security, transportation, and budget complications for the coast-to-coast reality series.

== Tuesday ==
Network		8:00 p.m.	8:30 p.m.	9:00 p.m.	9:30 p.m.	10:00 p.m.	10:30 p.m.
ABC	Fall	Dharma & Greg	What About Joan?	**Bob Patterson**	Spin City	**Philly**	
ABC	Mid-fall	Dharma & Greg	Spin City	NYPD Blue (23/8.3) (Tied with The Practice)		**Philly**	
ABC	Winter	**The Chair**		NYPD Blue (23/8.3) (Tied with The Practice)		**Philly**	
ABC	Late winter	Dharma & Greg	Spin City	NYPD Blue (23/8.3) (Tied with The Practice)		**Philly**	
ABC	Spring	Dharma & Greg	Spin City	NYPD Blue (23/8.3) (Tied with The Practice)		**The Court**	
ABC	Mid-spring	Special programming				NYPD Blue (23/8.3) (Tied with The Practice)	
ABC	Summer	**According to Jim** (R)		The Mole		**Houston Medical**	
ABC	Mid-summer	**According to Jim** (R)		**Monk** (R)		**Widows**	
CBS		JAG (14/9.9) (Tied with Frasier)		**The Guardian** (22/8.4)		Judging Amy (16/9.8) (Tied with Inside Schwartz)	
Fox	Fall	That '70s Show	**Undeclared**	**Love Cruise**		Local programming	
Fox	Mid-fall	That '70s Show	**Undeclared**	**24**		Local programming	
Fox	Winter	That '70s Show	**Andy Richter Controls the Universe**	**24**		Local programming	
Fox	Spring	That '70s Show	That '70s Show (R)	**24**		Local programming	
Fox	Late spring	That '70s Show (R)		**American Idol:** **The Search for a Superstar**		Local programming	
Fox	Summer	That '70s Show (R)	Grounded for Life	**American Idol:** **The Search for a Superstar**		Local programming	
NBC	Fall	**Emeril**	Three Sisters	Frasier (14/9.9) (Tied with JAG)	**Scrubs**	Dateline Tuesday	
NBC	Winter	Frasier (R)	Three Sisters	Frasier (14/9.9) (Tied with JAG)	**Scrubs**	Dateline Tuesday	
NBC	Late winter	Frasier (R)	**Watching Ellie**	Frasier (14/9.9) (Tied with JAG)	**Scrubs**	Dateline Tuesday	
NBC	Spring	Special programming		Frasier (14/9.9) (Tied with JAG)	**Scrubs**	Dateline Tuesday	
NBC	Summer	Spy TV	Spy TV (R)	Frasier (14/9.9) (Tied with JAG)	**Scrubs**	Dateline Tuesday	
NBC	Mid-summer	Just Shoot Me! (R)	**The Rerun Show**	Frasier (14/9.9) (Tied with JAG)	**Scrubs**	Dateline Tuesday	
UPN	Fall	Buffy the Vampire Slayer		Roswell		Local programming	
UPN	Winter	Buffy the Vampire Slayer		Various programming		Local programming	
UPN	Spring	Buffy the Vampire Slayer		**As If**	**The Random Years**	Local programming	
UPN	Mid-spring	Buffy the Vampire Slayer		Roswell		Local programming	
UPN	Summer	Buffy the Vampire Slayer		**Under One Roof**		Local programming	
UPN	Mid-summer	Buffy the Vampire Slayer		Various programming		Local programming	
The WB		Gilmore Girls		**Smallville**		Local programming	

Note: Buffy the Vampire Slayer and Roswell moved to UPN from The WB this season.

== Wednesday ==
Network		8:00 p.m.	8:30 p.m.	9:00 p.m.	9:30 p.m.	10:00 p.m.	10:30 p.m.
ABC	Fall	My Wife & Kids	**According to Jim**	The Drew Carey Show	Whose Line is it Anyway?	20/20 Downtown	
ABC	Winter	My Wife & Kids	**According to Jim**	The Drew Carey Show	The Job	20/20 Downtown	
ABC	Spring	My Wife & Kids	**George Lopez**	The Drew Carey Show	The Job	20/20 Downtown	
ABC	Mid-spring	My Wife & Kids	**According to Jim**	The Drew Carey Show	The Job	20/20 Downtown	
ABC	Late spring	My Wife & Kids	**According to Jim**	The Drew Carey Show	**My Adventures in Television**	20/20 Downtown	
ABC	Early summer	My Wife & Kids	**According to Jim**	The Drew Carey Show (R)		20/20 Downtown	
ABC	Summer	My Wife & Kids (R)		The Drew Carey Show (R)		20/20 Downtown	
CBS	Fall	60 Minutes II (30/7.7) (Tied with Family Law)		**The Amazing Race**		**Wolf Lake**	
CBS	Mid-fall	60 Minutes II (30/7.7) (Tied with Family Law)		**The Amazing Race**		Special programming	
CBS	Winter	60 Minutes II (30/7.7) (Tied with Family Law)		CBS Wednesday Movie			
CBS	Late winter	60 Minutes II (30/7.7) (Tied with Family Law)		**The Amazing Race**		48 Hours	
CBS	Spring	60 Minutes II (30/7.7) (Tied with Family Law)		CBS Wednesday Movie			
CBS	Summer	60 Minutes II (30/7.7) (Tied with Family Law)		Big Brother		48 Hours	
Fox	Fall	Malcolm in the Middle (R)	Grounded for Life	Various programming		Local programming	
Fox	Mid-fall	Malcolm in the Middle (R)	Grounded for Life	**The Bernie Mac Show**	Titus	Local programming	
Fox	Winter	**That '80s Show**	Grounded for Life	**The Bernie Mac Show**	Titus	Local programming	
Fox	Spring	**That '80s Show**	Grounded for Life	**The Bernie Mac Show**	**Greg the Bunny**	Local programming	
Fox	Mid-spring	Various programming	Grounded for Life	**The Bernie Mac Show**	**Greg the Bunny**	Local programming	
Fox	Late spring	Various programming	Grounded for Life	**The Bernie Mac Show**	**American Idol:** **The Search for a Superstar**	Local programming	
Fox	Summer	**30 Seconds to Fame**	Special programming	**The Bernie Mac Show**	**American Idol:** **The Search for a Superstar**	Local programming	
Fox	Mid-summer	**30 Seconds to Fame**		**The Bernie Mac Show**	**American Idol:** **The Search for a Superstar**	Local programming	
NBC	Fall	Ed		The West Wing (8/11.4)		Law & Order (5/12.6)	
NBC	Summer	Special programming		The West Wing (8/11.4)		Law & Order (5/12.6)	
UPN	Fall	**Star Trek: Enterprise**		Special Unit 2		Local programming	
UPN	Winter	**Star Trek: Enterprise**		Special programming		Local programming	
UPN	Spring	**Star Trek: Enterprise**		**Wolf Lake**		Local programming	
UPN	Mid-spring	**Star Trek: Enterprise**		Various programming		Local programming	
UPN	Late spring	**Star Trek: Enterprise**		**Wolf Lake** (R)		Local programming	
UPN	Summer	**Star Trek: Enterprise**		Buffy the Vampire Slayer (R)		Local programming	
The WB	Fall	Dawson's Creek		Felicity		Local programming	
The WB	Winter	Dawson's Creek		**Glory Days**		Local programming	
The WB	Spring	Dawson's Creek		Felicity		Local programming	
The WB	Late spring	Dawson's Creek (R)				Local programming	
The WB	Summer	WB Wednesday Movie				Local programming	

- Note: When their original fall schedule was announced, ABC planned for the second season of The Job to air after The Drew Carey Show in mid-September, leading into NYPD Blue in the 10pm ET timeslot after 20/20 Downtown returned to Friday nights in late December. The series was delayed after 9/11 and premiered on January 16 to allow the show's cast and crew to adjust the scripts and tone for the New York-set police dramedy to the city's new post-9/11 reality. In the meantime, Bob Patterson moved to that same timeslot in an attempt to save the show, with NYPD Blue returning to its traditional Tuesday night berth, albeit one hour earlier at 9 p.m. ET.

== Thursday ==
Network		8:00 p.m.	8:30 p.m.	9:00 p.m.	9:30 p.m.	10:00 p.m.	10:30 p.m.
ABC	Fall	Whose Line Is It Anyway?	Whose Line Is It Anyway? (R)	Who Wants to Be a Millionaire		Primetime	
ABC	Winter	Whose Line Is It Anyway?	Whose Line Is It Anyway? (R)	Who Wants to Be a Millionaire		Primetime	
ABC	Spring	Whose Line Is It Anyway?	Whose Line Is It Anyway? (R)	Who Wants to Be a Millionaire		Primetime	
ABC	Summer	ABC Big Picture Show				Primetime	
CBS	Fall	Survivor: Africa (6/11.8)		CSI: Crime Scene Investigation (2/14.5)		**The Agency**	
CBS	Winter	Various programming		CSI: Crime Scene Investigation (2/14.5)		**The Agency**	
CBS	Late winter	Survivor: Marquesas (6/11.8)		CSI: Crime Scene Investigation (2/14.5)		**The Agency**	
CBS	Spring	The Price is Right Salutes		CSI: Crime Scene Investigation (2/14.5)		**The Agency**	
CBS	Summer	Big Brother		CSI: Crime Scene Investigation (2/14.5)		**The Agency**	
Fox	Fall	Special programming				Local programming	
Fox	Mid-fall	Family Guy	**The Tick**	Temptation Island		Local programming	
Fox	Winter	Family Guy	Family Guy (R)	Temptation Island		Local programming	
Fox	Late winter	Family Guy	Family Guy (R)	King of the Hill (R)	Futurama (R)	Local programming	
Fox	Spring	Fox Thursday Night Movie				Local programming	
Fox	Summer	Beyond Belief: Fact or Fiction		**The Pulse**		Local programming	
NBC	Fall	Friends (1/15.0)	**Inside Schwartz** (16/9.8) (Tied with Judging Amy)	Will & Grace (9/11.0) (Tied with Leap of Faith)	Just Shoot Me! (18/9.3)	ER (3/14.2)	
NBC	Mid-fall	Friends (1/15.0)	Various programming	Will & Grace (9/11.0) (Tied with Leap of Faith)	Just Shoot Me! (18/9.3)	ER (3/14.2)	
NBC	Late fall	Friends (1/15.0)	**Inside Schwartz** (16/9.8) (Tied with Judging Amy)	Will & Grace (9/11.0) (Tied with Leap of Faith)	Just Shoot Me! (18/9.3)	ER (3/14.2)	
NBC	Winter	Friends (1/15.0)	Will & Grace (R)	Will & Grace (9/11.0) (Tied with Leap of Faith)	Just Shoot Me! (18/9.3)	ER (3/14.2)	
NBC	Late winter	Friends (1/15.0)	**Leap of Faith** (9/11.0) (Tied with Will & Grace)	Will & Grace (9/11.0) (Tied with Leap of Faith)	Just Shoot Me! (18/9.3)	ER (3/14.2)	
NBC	Spring	Friends (1/15.0)	Friends (R)	Will & Grace (9/11.0) (Tied with Leap of Faith)	Just Shoot Me! (18/9.3)	ER (3/14.2)	
NBC	Late spring	Friends (1/15.0)	Various programming	Will & Grace (9/11.0) (Tied with Leap of Faith)	Just Shoot Me! (18/9.3)	ER (3/14.2)	
NBC	Summer	Friends (1/15.0)	**Scrubs** (R)	Will & Grace (9/11.0) (Tied with Leap of Faith)	Just Shoot Me! (18/9.3)	ER (3/14.2)	
NBC	Mid-summer	Friends (1/15.0)	**Scrubs** (R)	Will & Grace (9/11.0) (Tied with Leap of Faith)	**The Rerun Show**	ER (3/14.2)	
NBC	Late summer	Friends (1/15.0)	**Scrubs** (R)	Will & Grace (9/11.0) (Tied with Leap of Faith)	Various programming	ER (3/14.2)	
UPN		WWF SmackDown!				Local programming	
The WB	Fall	Popstars		Charmed		Local programming	
The WB	Late fall	Popstars	**Maybe It's Me** (R)	Charmed		Local programming	
The WB	Winter	Various programming		Charmed		Local programming	
The WB	Spring	Gilmore Girls (R)		Charmed		Local programming	
The WB	Late spring	**The Jamie Kennedy Experiment** (R)		Charmed		Local programming	
The WB	Summer	**Reba** (R)	**The Jamie Kennedy Experiment** (R)		**Off Centre** (R)	Local programming	

NOTE: The WB aired ElimiDate Deluxe at 8:30 pm on October 11 and 18 before being canceled due to low ratings.

== Friday ==
Network		8:00 p.m.	8:30 p.m.	9:00 p.m.	9:30 p.m.	10:00 p.m.	10:30 p.m.
ABC	Fall	The Mole: The Next Betrayal		**Thieves**		Once and Again	
ABC	Mid-fall	America's Funniest Home Videos		**Thieves**		Once and Again	
ABC	Late fall	America's Funniest Home Videos		Special programming		Once and Again	
ABC	Winter	America's Funniest Home Videos		Special programming		20/20	
ABC	Spring	America's Funniest Home Videos		Various programming		20/20	
ABC	Summer	America's Funniest Home Videos		Whose Line Is It Anyway? (R)		20/20	
CBS	Fall	**The Ellen Show**	**Danny**	That's Life		48 Hours	
CBS	Mid-fall	Various programming	**The Ellen Show**	That's Life		48 Hours	
CBS	Late fall	Special programming		That's Life		48 Hours	
CBS	Winter	JAG (R)		**First Monday**		48 Hours	
CBS	Spring	Various programming		**First Monday**		48 Hours	
CBS	Late spring	48 Hours		CBS Friday Night Movie			
CBS	Summer	48 Hours		Various programming			
Fox	Fall	Dark Angel		**Pasadena**		Local programming	
Fox	Mid-fall	Dark Angel		**24** (R)		Local programming	
Fox	Winter	That '70s Show (R)	Various programming	Dark Angel		Local programming	
Fox	Spring	Dark Angel (R)		The X-Files (R)		Local programming	
Fox	Summer	**Invasion of the Hidden Cameras**		The X-Files (R)		Local programming	
NBC	Fall	Providence (27/7.9) (Tied with Fear Factor and Law & Order: Criminal Intent)		Dateline NBC (25/8.1) (Tied with Baby Bob)		Law & Order: Special Victims Unit (12/10.4)	
NBC	Winter	Providence (27/7.9) (Tied with Fear Factor and Law & Order: Criminal Intent)		Dateline NBC (25/8.1) (Tied with Baby Bob)		Law & Order: Special Victims Unit (12/10.4)	
NBC	Spring	Dateline Friday (25/8.1) (Tied with Baby Bob)				Law & Order: Special Victims Unit (12/10.4)	
NBC	Summer	Dateline NBC (25/8.1) (Tied with Baby Bob)		Law & Order: Special Victims Unit (R)			
UPN	Fall	UPN's Night at the Movies				Local programming	
UPN	Spring	Various programming		**Under One Roof**		Local programming	
UPN	Mid-spring	UPN's Night at the Movies				Local programming	
The WB	Fall	Sabrina the Teenage Witch	**Maybe It's Me**	**Reba**	**Raising Dad**	Local programming	
The WB	Winter	Sabrina the Teenage Witch	**Raising Dad**	**Reba**	**Maybe It's Me**	Local programming	
The WB	Summer	Sabrina the Teenage Witch (R)		**Reba**	**Raising Dad** (R)	Local programming	

NOTE: Fox aired The Chamber on January 25, 2002, after two preview airings on past Sunday nights. The show was cancelled after its Friday night airing.

== Saturday ==
Network		8:00 p.m.	8:30 p.m.	9:00 p.m.	9:30 p.m.	10:00 p.m.	10:30 p.m.
ABC		ABC Big Picture Show					
CBS	Fall	Touched by an Angel		**Citizen Baines**		The District	
CBS	Mid-fall	Touched by an Angel		Various programming		The District	
CBS	Summer	Big Brother		The District (R)		**The Agency** (R)	
Fox		COPS	COPS (R)	America's Most Wanted: America Fights Back		Local programming	
NBC		Special programming		NBC Saturday Night Movie			

== By network ==
=== ABC ===
**Returning series**

- 20/20
- ABC Big Picture Show
- The ABC Monday Night Movie
- ABC Saturday Night Movie
- America's Funniest Home Videos
- Dharma & Greg
- The Drew Carey Show
- The Job
- The Mole
- Monday Night Football
- My Wife and Kids
- NYPD Blue
- Once and Again
- The Practice
- Primetime Thursday
- Spin City
- The Wayne Brady Show
- What About Joan?
- Who Wants to Be a Millionaire
- Whose Line Is It Anyway?
- The Wonderful World of Disney

**New series**

- **According to Jim**
- **Alias**
- **The Bachelor**
- **Bob Patterson**
- **The Chair** *
- **The Court** *
- **George Lopez** *
- **Houston Medical** *
- **Monk** (reruns) (Note: A USA Network original series; airs repeats.)
- **Philly**
- **Thieves**
- **Wednesday 9:30 (8:30 Central)** *
- **Widows** *

Not returning from 2000–01:

- The Beast
- Dot Comedy
- The Geena Davis Show
- Gideon's Crossing
- Madigan Men
- Making the Band (revived and moved to MTV in 2002)
- The Norm Show
- The Trouble With Normal
- Two Guys and a Girl
- You Don't Know Jack

=== CBS ===
**Returning series**

- 48 Hours
- 60 Minutes
- 60 Minutes II
- Becker
- Big Brother
- CBS Friday Night Movie
- CBS Sunday Movie
- CBS Wednesday Movie
- CSI: Crime Scene Investigation
- The District
- Everybody Loves Raymond
- Family Law
- JAG
- Judging Amy
- The King of Queens
- Survivor
- That's Life
- Touched by an Angel
- Yes, Dear

**New series**

- **AFP: American Fighter Pilot** *
- **The Amazing Race**
- **The Agency**
- **Baby Bob** *
- **Citizen Baines**
- **Danny**
- **The Education of Max Bickford**
- **The Ellen Show**
- **First Monday** *
- **The Guardian**
- **Wolf Lake**

Not returning from 2000–01:

- Bette
- Big Apple
- Diagnosis: Murder
- The Fugitive
- Kate Brasher
- Ladies Man
- Nash Bridges
- Some of My Best Friends
- Walker, Texas Ranger
- Welcome to New York

=== Fox ===
**Returning series**

- Ally McBeal
- America's Most Wanted
- Beyond Belief: Fact or Fiction
- Boston Public
- Cops
- Dark Angel
- Family Guy
- Fox Thursday Night Movie
- Futurama
- Grounded for Life
- Guinness World Records Primetime
- King of the Hill
- Malcolm in the Middle
- That '70s Show
- The Simpsons
- Temptation Island
- Titus
- World's Wildest Police Videos
- The X-Files

**New series**

- **24**
- **30 Seconds to Fame** *
- **The American Embassy** *
- **American Idol** *
- **Andy Richter Controls the Universe** *
- **The Bernie Mac Show**
- **The Chamber** *
- **Greg the Bunny** *
- **Looking for Love: Bachelorettes in Alaska** *
- **Love Cruise**
- **Meet the Marks** *
- **Pasadena**
- **The Pulse** *
- **That '80s Show** *
- **The Tick**
- **Undeclared**

Not returning from 2000–01:

- Boot Camp
- FreakyLinks
- The Lone Gunmen
- Murder in Small Town X
- Night Visions
- Normal, Ohio
- The Street

=== NBC ===
**Returning series**

- Dateline NBC
- Ed
- ER
- Fear Factor
- Frasier
- Friends
- Just Shoot Me!
- Law & Order
- Law & Order: Special Victims Unit
- NBC Saturday Night Movie
- Providence
- Spy TV
- Third Watch
- Three Sisters
- The Weakest Link
- The West Wing
- Will & Grace

**New series**

- **Crossing Jordan**
- **Dog Eat Dog** *
- **Emeril**
- **Imagine That** *
- **Inside Schwartz**
- **Law & Order: Criminal Intent**
- **Leap of Faith**
- **Lost**
- **Meet My Folks** *
- **The Rerun Show** *
- **Scrubs**
- **UC: Undercover**
- **Watching Ellie** *

Not returning from 2000–01:

- Cursed (renamed The Weber Show)
- DAG
- Daddio
- Deadline
- The Downer Channel
- The Fighting Fitzgeralds
- First Years
- Go Fish
- Kristin
- The Michael Richards Show
- 3rd Rock from the Sun
- Titans
- Tucker

=== UPN ===
**Returning series**

- Buffy the Vampire Slayer (moved from The WB)
- Girlfriends
- The Hughleys
- The Parkers
- Roswell (moved from The WB)
- Special Unit 2
- UPN's Night at the Movies
- WWE SmackDown!

**New series**

- **As If** *
- **One on One**
- **The Random Years** *
- **Star Trek: Enterprise**
- **Under One Roof** *

Not returning from 2000–01:

- All Souls
- Chains of Love
- Freedom
- Gary and Mike
- Level 9
- Manhunt
- Moesha
- Seven Days
- Star Trek: Voyager

=== The WB ===
**Returning series**

- 7th Heaven
- Angel
- Charmed
- Dawson’s Creek
- Felicity
- Flix From the Frog
- For Your Love
- Gilmore Girls
- Nikki
- Popstars USA
- Ripley's Believe It or Not!
- Sabrina the Teenage Witch
- The Steve Harvey Show
- WB Wednesday Movie

**New series**

- **Elimidate Deluxe**
- **Glory Days** *
- **The Jamie Kennedy Experiment** *
- **Maybe It's Me**
- **Men, Women & Dogs**
- **My Guide to Becoming a Rock Star** *
- **Off Centre**
- **Raising Dad**
- **Reba**
- **Ripley's Believe It or Not!** (reruns) (Note: A TBS Superstation original series; airs repeats.)
- **Smallville**

Not returning from 2000–01:

- Buffy the Vampire Slayer (moved to UPN)
- Grosse Pointe
- Hype
- Jack & Jill
- The Jamie Foxx Show
- The Oblongs
- The PJs
- Popular
- Roswell (moved to UPN)

Note: The * indicates that the program was introduced in midseason.

== Renewals and cancellations ==
=== Renewals ===
==== ABC ====
- According to Jim—Renewed for the 2002–2003 season.
- Alias—Renewed for the 2002–2003 season.
- The Drew Carey Show—Renewed for the 2002–2003 season.
- George Lopez—Renewed for the 2002–2003 season.
- My Wife and Kids—Renewed for the 2002–2003 season.
- NYPD Blue—Renewed for the 2002–2003 season.
- The Practice—Renewed for the 2002–2003 season.

==== CBS ====
- The Agency—Renewed for the 2002–2003 season.
- Baby Bob—Renewed for the 2002–2003 season.
- Becker—Renewed for the 2002–2003 season.
- CSI: Crime Scene Investigation—Renewed for the 2002–2003 season.
- The District—Renewed for the 2002–2003 season.
- Everybody Loves Raymond—Renewed for the 2002–2003 season.
- The Guardian—Renewed for the 2002–2003 season.
- JAG—Renewed for the 2002–2003 season.
- Judging Amy—Renewed for the 2002–2003 season.
- The King of Queens—Renewed for the 2002–2003 season.
- Touched by an Angel—Renewed for the 2002–2003 season.
- Yes, Dear—Renewed for the 2002–2003 season.

==== Fox ====
- 24—Renewed for the 2002–2003 season.
- Andy Richter Controls the Universe—Renewed for the 2002–2003 season.
- The Bernie Mac Show—Renewed for the 2002–2003 season.
- Boston Public—Renewed for the 2002–2003 season.
- Futurama—Renewed for the 2002–2003 season.
- King of the Hill—Renewed for the 2002–2003 season.
- Malcolm in the Middle—Renewed for the 2002–2003 season.
- The Simpsons—Renewed for the 2002–2003 season.
- That '70s Show—Renewed for the 2002–2003 season.

==== NBC ====
- Crossing Jordan—Renewed for the 2002–2003 season.
- Ed—Renewed for the 2002–2003 season.
- ER—Renewed for the 2002–2003 season.
- Frasier—Renewed for the 2002–2003 season.
- Friends—Renewed for the 2002–2003 season.
- Just Shoot Me!—Renewed for the 2002–2003 season.
- Law & Order—Renewed for the 2002–2003 season.
- Law & Order: Criminal Intent—Renewed for the 2002–2003 season.
- Law & Order: Special Victims Unit—Renewed for the 2002–2003 season.
- Providence—Renewed for the 2002–2003 season.
- Scrubs—Renewed for the 2002–2003 season.
- Third Watch—Renewed for the 2002–2003 season.
- Watching Ellie—Renewed for the 2002–2003 season.
- The West Wing—Renewed for the 2002–2003 season.
- Will & Grace—Renewed for the 2002–2003 season.

==== UPN ====
- Buffy the Vampire Slayer—Renewed for the 2002–2003 season.
- Girlfriends—Renewed for the 2002–2003 season.
- One on One—Renewed for the 2002–2003 season.
- The Parkers—Renewed for the 2002–2003 season.
- Star Trek: Enterprise—Renewed for the 2002–2003 season.

==== The WB ====
- 7th Heaven—Renewed for the 2002–2003 season.
- Angel—Renewed for the 2002–2003 season.
- Charmed—Renewed for the 2002–2003 season.
- Dawson’s Creek—Renewed for the 2002–2003 season.
- Gilmore Girls—Renewed for the 2002–2003 season.
- Off Centre—Renewed for the 2002–2003 season.
- Reba—Renewed for the 2002–2003 season.
- Sabrina the Teenage Witch—Renewed for the 2002–2003 season.
- Smallville—Renewed for the 2002–2003 season.

=== Cancellations/series endings ===
==== ABC ====
- Bob Patterson—Canceled after one season, due to the September 11, 2001 attacks.
- The Court—Canceled after one season.
- Dharma & Greg—Ended after five seasons.
- The Job—Canceled after two seasons.
- Once and Again—Ended after three seasons.
- Philly—Canceled after one season.
- Spin City—Ended after six seasons.
- Thieves—Canceled after one season.
- Wednesday 9:30 (8:30 Central)—Canceled after one season.
- What About Joan?—Canceled after two seasons, due to the September 11, 2001 attacks.

==== CBS ====
- Citizen Baines—Canceled after one season.
- Danny—Canceled after one season.
- The Education of Max Bickford—Canceled after one season.
- The Ellen Show—Canceled after one season.
- Family Law—Ended after three seasons.
- First Monday—Canceled after one season.
- That's Life—Canceled after two seasons.
- Wolf Lake—Canceled by CBS after 5 episodes. The final 4 episodes aired from April 10, 2002 until May 1, 2002 on UPN.

==== Fox ====
- Ally McBeal—Ended after five seasons.
- The American Embassy—Canceled after one season.
- Dark Angel—Canceled after two seasons.
- Family Guy—Returned for the 2004–2005 season.
- Grounded for Life—Moved to The WB on February 28, 2003.
- Pasadena—Canceled after one season.
- That '80s Show—Canceled after one season.
- The Tick—Canceled after one season.
- Titus—Canceled after three seasons.
- Undeclared—Canceled after one season.
- The X-Files—Returned for the 2015–2016 season.

==== NBC ====
- Emeril—Canceled after one season.
- Imagine That—Canceled after one season.
- Inside Schwartz—Canceled after one season.
- Leap of Faith—Canceled after one season.
- Three Sisters—Canceled after two seasons.
- UC: Undercover—Canceled after one season.
- The Weakest Link—Returned for the 2020–2021 season.

==== UPN ====
- As If—Canceled after one season.
- The Hughleys—Ended after four seasons.
- The Random Years—Canceled after one season.
- Roswell—Ended after three seasons.

==== The WB ====
- Felicity—Ended after four seasons.
- For Your Love—Ended after five seasons.
- Glory Days—Canceled after one season.
- Maybe It's Me—Canceled after one season.
- Men, Women & Dogs—Canceled after one season.
- My Guide to Becoming a Rock Star—Canceled after one season.
- Nikki—Canceled after two seasons.
- Raising Dad—Canceled after one season.
- The Steve Harvey Show—Ended after six seasons.
