= Georgia Sugimura Archer =

Producer and casting director

Georgia Sugimura Archer (born February 12, 1964) is a producer, writer, director, and casting director, known for Barbershop Punk (2010), The Mop and Lucky Files (2012) and Peter Rabbit and the Crucifix (2001). Archer's most notable work, Barbershop Punk, advocates for Internet neutrality.

== Early life ==
Georgia Archer was born in Caribou, Maine. She is a former American Bandstand dancer, AFI Outstanding Producing Fellow Scholarship Recipient (1998) and New Line Cinema/Women in Film Scholarship Recipient (1998).

== Personal life ==
Archer has been married to Anthony Dominici since April 29, 2000.

== Filmography ==
Barbershop Punk (2010) - Documentary Film - Director/ Writer/ Producer

Peter Rabbit and the Crucifix (2001) - Short - Produce/ Supervising Producer

The Mop & Lucky Files (2016) - TV Movie - Producer

The Mop and Lucky Files (2012) -TV Series - Producer

When the Levee Breaks (2006) - Short - Producer

The Real World (1991) - TV Series - Associate Producer/ Casting Director

Odd Man (1998) - Short - Producer

Love Cruise: The Maiden Voyage (2001) TV Series - Casting Director

Road Rules (1995) TV Series - Casting Director
