= Domestic Goddess =

Domestic Goddess may refer to:

- A female household deity
- Domestic Goddess (television), a planned cooking show hosted by Roseanne Barr that was canceled before airing
- Nickname of Nigella Lawson, author of a cookbook entitled How to Be a Domestic Goddess
