= The Random Years =

American sitcom

- Genre: Sitcom
- Created by: Michael Lisbe; Nate Reger
- Starring: Will Friedle; Joshua Ackerman; Sean Murray; Natalia Cigliuti
- Country of origin: United States
- No. of seasons: 1
- No. of episodes: 7 (3 unaired)

Production
- Executive producers: John Peaslee; Judd Pillot
- Producers: Dan Dugan; Mary Fukuto; Jonathan M. Goldstein
- Production locations: Los Angeles, California
- Cinematography: Jerry Workman
- Editors: Harold McKenzie; Sharon Silverman
- Running time: 30 minutes
- Production companies: Big Phone Productions; Paramount Television

Original release
- Network: UPN
- Release: March 5 – March 19, 2002

The Random Years is an American sitcom created by Michael Lisbe and Nate Reger that aired for four episodes on UPN in March 2002. The series centers on childhood friends Alex Barnes (Will Friedle), Wiseman (Joshua Ackerman), and Todd Mitchell (Sean Murray) and their lives after graduating college while living in Chinatown, Manhattan. Storylines focus on the characters' jobs and romantic relationships, often including their neighbor Casey Parker (Natalia Cigliuti) and their building superintendent Steve (Winston J. Rochas).

Lisbe and Reger based The Random Years on their own experiences living in New York City. UPN produced the show, along with As If, as mid-season replacements for Roswell, which was not performing well with its ratings. Friedle was initially cast in Off Centre, a sitcom for The WB Television Network, but appeared in The Random Years after being replaced by Eddie Kaye Thomas in the former.

The Random Years, along with As If, received the lowest ratings of any original program aired that season on network television. UPN canceled the series after four of its seven filmed episodes aired. Some critics described the show as enjoyable despite its predictability while others criticized it as too formulaic. Although certain actors were praised in reviews, the cast as a whole received negative feedback.

== Premise and characters ==
The Random Years follows three childhood friends—Alex Barnes (Will Friedle), Wiseman (Joshua Ackerman), and Todd Mitchell (Sean Murray)—as they attempt to navigate life after graduating college. They were friends since elementary school and during the series, they are in their early 20s and share a loft apartment in Chinatown, Manhattan. Alex is a researcher and an assistant to a rock critic for Music Week magazine; he runs his own website, but dreams of being a music critic. A mama's boy, Wiseman only became a dental technician to please her and is not interested in being a dentist. At the start of the series, he strives to act more independently. The unemployed Todd does not have any plans for his future, and instead relies on schemes and is frequently shown watching television. He connects everything to Star Wars to the point of saying: "I don't make fun of your religion, you don't make fun of mine." The series characterizes Alex as lovesick, Wiseman as eccentric, and Todd as a slacker. Critics compared Wiseman to Cosmo Kramer from the sitcom Seinfeld, writing that both have uncontrollable hair and are idiot savants.

Alex hires Casey Parker (Natalia Cigliuti) to help him with his website. Casey is a temp worker who attends New York University Stern School of Business. Having only recently moved to New York City, she struggles to make it on her own, but the show portrays her as ambitious. She moves into the men's building, with Alex's assistance, in the second episode. Her apartment was previously used by Steve (Winston J. Rochas), the building superintendent, to store his brother's stolen goods. Casey enjoys watching Antiques Roadshow, and she and Todd play a form of strip poker based on the show. Alex, Wiseman, and Todd each want to date Casey.

On their website, the United Paramount Network (UPN) promoted the characters as forming "an oddball kind of family" and the series as about "somewhere between high school and the rest of your life". Storylines focus on the characters' jobs and romantic relationships. The Courier-Journal's Tom Dorsey described The Random Years as potentially "a what-do-women-want sitcom", while other television journalists likened the show to a buddy comedy. In a Variety article, Phil Gallo believed the episodes were aimed at a primarily male audience, and People's Terry Kelleher associated the series with a "frat-house atmosphere".

== Production and broadcast history ==
Show creators Michael Lisbe and Nate Reger based The Random Years on their experiences living in New York City after graduating from college. Discussing the premise, Reger explained: "It's sort of that time in your life pre-any responsibilities. You can get involved in any sort of adventure that happens. Your work life hasn't become that important to you yet. It's sort of just about your relationships with your friends and the people you meet out in the city." Lisbe and Reger had previously worked together as writers for the sitcom Spin City. The Random Years, developed under the working title Life as We Know It, was produced by Big Phone Productions in association with Paramount Television. John Peaslee and Judd Pillot served as the executive producers while Lisbe and Reger were the supervising producers.

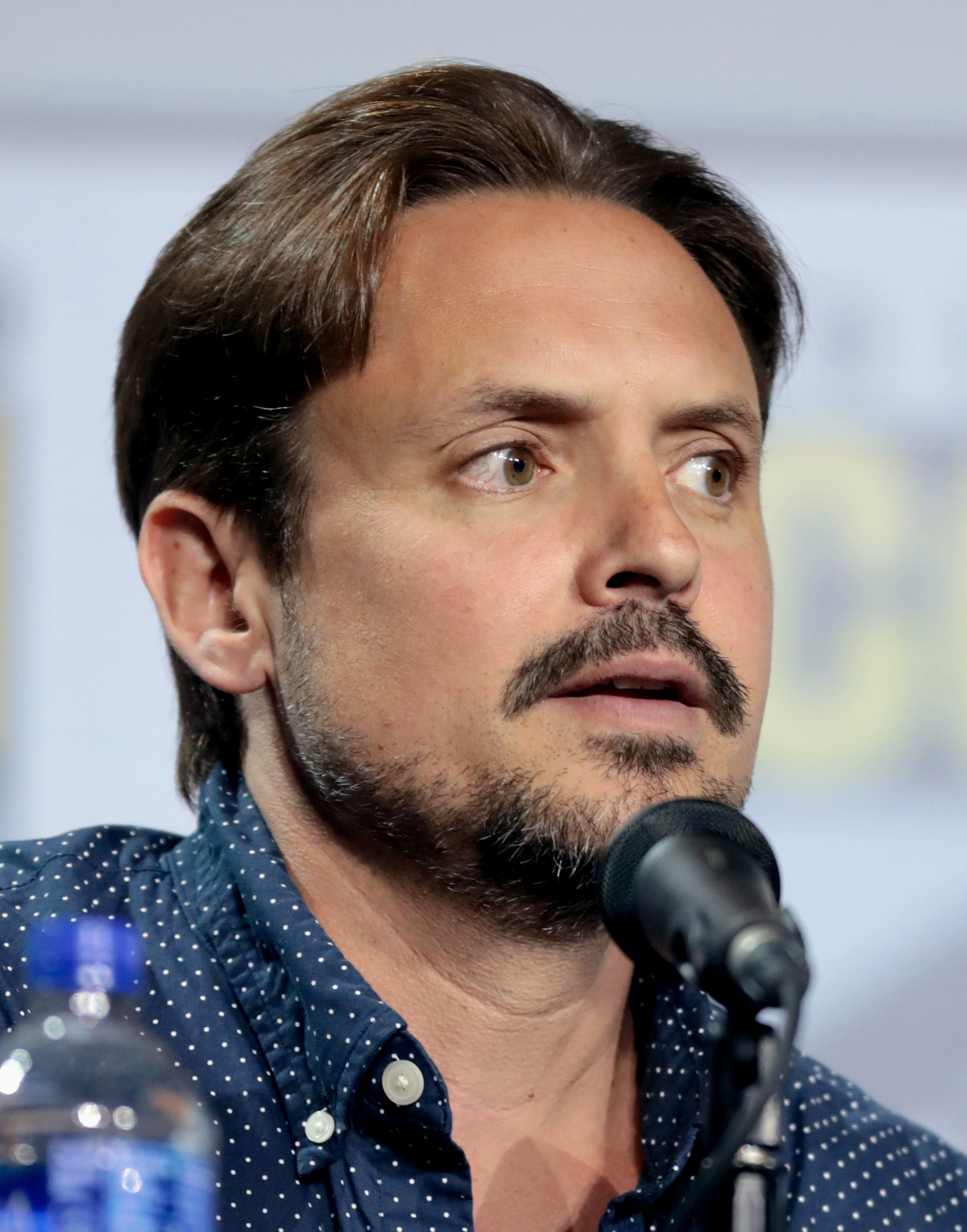
Will Friedle (pictured in 2019) appeared in The Random Years after being replaced "at the last moment" by Eddie Kaye Thomas on Off Centre.

Dan Dugan and Mary Fukuto acted as the show's producers. The production designer was Wendell Johnson and the director of photography was Jerry Workman. Episodes were edited by Sharon Silverman, the music done by Bruce and Jason Miller, and the casting was handled by Tracy Kaplan. The series was filmed in Los Angeles. Prior to the show's production, Will Friedle was scheduled to star in Off Centre, a sitcom for The WB Television Network, before being replaced by Eddie Kaye Thomas. When asked about the casting changes, Friedle responded: "I'm on the show that I really wanted to be on. And I'm doing what I really wanted to do. And I think we're all happy to be where we are now and just ready to get started."

In January 2002, studio executive Les Moonves presented The Random Years as part of a panel of shows scheduled for the upcoming spring and summer. These new programs were not put forward with a television pilot or definite premiere dates. The Random Years, along with the sitcom As If, were mid-season replacements for the science fiction show Roswell. To make room for the two new sitcoms, UPN placed Roswell on hiatus for seven weeks, and scheduled it to return on April 23 and continue to May sweeps. According to a 2002 Broadcasting & Cable article, Roswell received low ratings; the magazine reported that UPN was scaling back on the series and would likely cancel it. The network denied these claims, saying they were "just making room for its midseason shows". Television journalists described As If and The Random Years as aimed at a younger audience.

Premiering on March 5, 2002, The Random Years aired on Tuesdays at 9:30 pm EST after As If; its first episode was watched by 1.4 million viewers. As If and The Random Years had the lowest ratings on network television for the season and both series had a lower viewership than Roswell. The March 12 episodes of As If and The Random Years lost two-thirds of the viewers from their lead-in program Buffy the Vampire Slayer. UPN canceled The Random Years after three weeks, and the final two aired episodes were shown on March 19, though more were produced. The following week, both shows were replaced by the premiere of the reality show Under One Roof in the same time slot. Seven episodes of The Random Years were filmed, although only four were aired. In 2016, Irvin listed the series in his book Forgotten Laughs: An Episode Guide to 150 TV Sitcoms You Probably Never Saw. According to TV Guide, it is not available for streaming on any digital platform.

== Episodes ==
No.	Title	Directed by	Written by	Original release date	US viewers (millions)
1	"Pilot"	Lee Shallat Chemel	Mike Lisbe and Nate Reger	March 5, 2002	1.4
Alex Barnes hires Casey Parker as a temp worker for his music website in order to have time to meet with his old girlfriend, Megan. At the same time, Wiseman seduces a woman at a local laundromat by using "sexy sheets". While on a double-date at a restaurant, Alex and Wiseman discover unflattering traits about their dates. Megan has lied about her past, while Wiseman's date has trouble controlling her temper. Alex ends both dates by pretending to have an allergic reaction. Meanwhile, Todd Mitchell and Casey bond over their shared love for Antiques Roadshow; they create a version of strip poker inspired by the show; Todd loses the game.
2	"Don't Make Me Have Sex in the Hamptons"	Matthew Diamond	Mike Lisbe and Nate Reger	March 12, 2002	1.4
After his music website crashes, Alex works at a music magazine as an assistant to a rock critic. At the same time, he has difficulty breaking up with his new girlfriend, Melissa, after he finds her to be too clingy. Wiseman helps Casey look for a new apartment by directing her to Melissa, who is a real estate agent. Alex plans to go on a weekend trip to the Hamptons with Melissa to help Casey find a new place. Casey decides to talk to Melissa about Alex wanting to end their relationship. She purchases an apartment across the hall from Alex, Wiseman, and Todd. The space was originally used as a storage unit by the building superintendent, Steve.
3	"Men Behaving Sadly"	Matthew Diamond	Judd Pillot and John Peaslee	March 19, 2002	2.04
After Casey's boyfriend cancels a weekend trip to the city, Alex, Wiseman, and Todd encourage Casey to talk to him about their relationship. When the couple breaks up, they each attempt to attract Casey. However, they fail when she reconciles with her boyfriend. Meanwhile, one of Wiseman's frequent patients has sexual fantasies about being naked in the dental chair. However, Wiseman does not notice her sexual advances towards him.
4	"Dangerous Liaisons"	Matthew Diamond	Maisha Closson	March 19, 2002	1.95
Alex dates Todd's ex-girlfriend, Sydney, which leads to friction between the two men. Todd and Sydney disagree over who ended the relationship but eventually reconcile. Sydney still has romantic feelings for Alex, but Alex and Todd decide to not pursue a relationship with her. Meanwhile, Wiseman becomes attracted to a new barista, Tanya. To get her attention, he has Casey pretend to be his girlfriend so they can publicly break up in front of her. After approaching Tanya, Wiseman believes that she wants a threesome with Casey. However, this turns out to be a miscommunication, as Tanya just wanted to spend time with Wiseman and Casey.
5	"Inherit the Windbreaker"	Matthew Diamond	Jonathan Goldstein	Unaired	—
Alex, Wiseman, and Todd grow jealous of their neighbor, who continually throws popular parties in an upstairs apartment. They decide to hold a party of their own, but get locked out of their loft on the day of the party due to a dispute with their landlord. Meanwhile, Wiseman is pressured to take his aunt to a play.
6	"Losin' It"	Matthew Diamond	Mike Lisbe and Nate Reger	Unaired	—
With Steve's help, Alex, Wiseman, and Todd have stolen cable in their loft; however, they encounter technical difficulties when attempting to watch a highly-anticipated boxing match. Meanwhile, Wiseman is losing his confidence with women after learning that Alex and Todd abandoned him during the junior prom to lose their virginity. He has an unsuccessful date with a woman at a theatre. In response, he plots with Steve to get revenge on Alex and Todd. They have the cable company visit the loft to warn Alex and Todd about stealing cable. Alex and Todd tell Wiseman that they did not have sex during the junior prom, which restores his confidence. He goes on another date with the woman from the theatre.
7	"Boy Meets World"	Matthew Diamond	Jonathan Goldstein	Unaired	—
Wiseman and Todd help Alex babysit his nephew. (Note: Irvin provides only a limited plot summary for this episode as opposed to the other six.) (Note: An alternative title for the episode "Boy Meets World" was "Corrupting Jacob".)

== Critical reception ==
Critics described The Random Years as enjoyable yet unoriginal. Caryn James, while writing for The New York Times, felt the series was "not painfully bad, just by-the-numbers and predictable". Deseret News's Scott D. Pierce appreciated the show's humor, but questioned if stories only about friendships in the city would be sustainable. In the Los Angeles Times, Scott Sandell considered The Random Years to be derivative of Seinfeld, and thought both focused on the minutiae of daily life. Despite criticizing the storylines as predictable, Sandell found the humor and characters to be enjoyable. David Kronke of the Los Angeles Daily News and Phil Gallo praised the show's premise, writing there was potential in exploring post-college life, but both reviewers were critical of the execution. Gallo did not think there was enough material to keep viewers engaged, and Kronke said the episodes would benefit from better scripts.

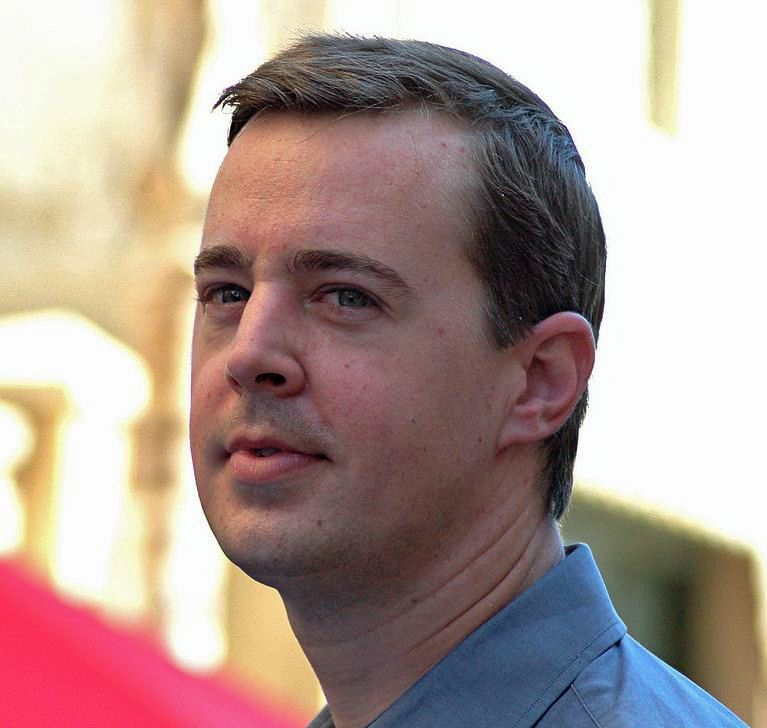
Reviewers spotlighted certain cast members, such as Sean Murray (pictured in 2012).

The Random Years received criticism for its writing, which reviewers felt relied on clichés. The Tampa Bay Times's Eric Deggans panned the series as having "a serious case of sitcomitis", writing that the character types and the humor's focus on sex and dating were formulaic. Dismissing the show as a "pedestrian comedy", Allan Johnson for the Chicago Tribune questioned its purpose while criticizing the producers for not handling the matter in either an insightful or a funny manner. In the Fort Worth Star-Telegram, Ken Parish Perkins wrote that The Random Years was too generic to attract an audience and said it would only appeal to those who "get a kick out of watching ships sink". Critics unfavorably compared the series to the sitcom Friends. While reviewing its series premiere, the Seattle Post-Intelligencer's John Levesque said The Random Years would "soon find its place among the other Friends pretenders in the great dustbin of shows lacking that magical combination of smart writing and lucky casting".

The cast's performances were highlighted by some reviewers. Newsday's Noel Holston praised Murray for conveying "effortless slacker charm", and wrote that he elevated the Antiques Roadshow strip poker scene to be the first episode's only highlight. Despite being critical of the rest of the cast, Gallo appreciated Cigliuti's comic timing and believed her appearance would appeal to male viewers. Terry Kelleher said Cigliuti added a much-needed female presence to the mostly male cast, and praised Murray's delivery of his jokes and Friedle's likability. Other critics had more negative reviews for the cast. Kelleher and The Baltimore Sun's David Zurawik criticized Ackerman's performance; Zurawik believed he was unconvincing as an idiot savant, while Kelleher thought he "pushes his oddball caricature too hard". Ann Hodges for the Houston Chronicle dismissed the cast as a "gang of lightweight newcomers" who could not act.
