= Jayne Brook =

American actress

- Born: Jane Anderson; September 16, 1960 (age 65); Northbrook, Illinois, U.S.
- Occupation: Actress
- Years active: 1987–present
- Spouse: John Terlesky (m. 1996)
- Children: 2

Jayne Brook (born Jane Anderson) (born September 16, 1960) is an American actress, best known for her roles as Dr. Diane Grad on the medical drama Chicago Hope, as a series regular for five of the show's six seasons, and Mary Ann Mitchell on The District from 2000 to 2002. Between 2017 and 2019, Brook had a recurring role as Starfleet Vice Admiral Katrina Cornwell in the series Star Trek: Discovery.

== Early life ==
Brook was born in Northbrook, Illinois. She graduated from Glenbrook North High School in 1978. She attended New College in Oxford, England, and Duke University on scholarship, earning a bachelor's degree in 1982. Brook is married to actor and director John Terlesky. They have two daughters.

== Career ==
Brook had acted in Britain's regional theatres and in London before she went to Los Angeles to begin acting on TV. She also worked briefly as a model.

Her first acting role was in the film Superman IV: The Quest for Peace in 1987. During the late 1980s, she worked for a while in Great Britain, appearing in The Old Boy Network, a single season ITV comedy series about three ex-spies who set up as private investigators after the end of the Cold War.

Brook went on to appear in numerous film and television roles, such as Carolyn in the 1991 film Don't Tell Mom the Babysitter's Dead, a starring role in the spring 1993 ABC network version of Sirens,. a guest star for a three-episode arc of L.A. Law and in the 1995 film Bye Bye Love. She also had a small part as a child's mother in Kindergarten Cop (1990). She had a major role in My Mother, the Spy (2000).

Her starring role in the ensemble cast of Chicago Hope, from 1994 to 1999, was followed by appearances in regular or recurring roles on such series as Sports Night, The District, John Doe, Boston Legal and Private Practice. Brook has been a guest star in single episodes of other series, including reuniting with her former Chicago Hope co-star Mark Harmon in a 2007 episode, "Cover Story", of his CBS television series NCIS.

From 2017 to 2019, Brook had a recurring role as Starfleet Admiral Katrina Cornwell on the first two seasons of Star Trek: Discovery.

== Filmography ==
Film
Year	Title	Role	Notes
1987	Superman IV: The Quest for Peace	JFK High School Teacher	
1990	Kindergarten Cop	Mrs. Sullivan	
1991	Don't Tell Mom the Babysitter's Dead	Carolyn	
1994	Clean Slate	Paula	
1995	Bye Bye Love	Claire Carson	
1996	Ed	Lydia	
1996	Last Dance	Jill	
1997	Gattaca	Marie Freeman	
1998	Into My Heart	Kat	
2000	Chain of Command	Connelly's Ex-Wife	Uncredited
2017	The Sweet Life	Katherine	

Television
Year	Title	Role	Notes
1990	The Endless Game	Mrs. Glazer	Television film
1990	Equal Justice	Bonnie Ehlman	Episode: "The Price of Justice"
1990–1991	WIOU	Ann Hudson	14 episodes
1992	Doing Time on Maple Drive	Karen	Television film
1992	The Old Boy Network	Parker Morrow	4 episodes
1993	Sirens	Officer Sarah Berkezchuk	13 episodes
1993	L.A. Law	Beverly Halleran	3 episodes
1994	In the Best of Families: Marriage, Pride & Madness	Kathy	Television film
1995	The Four Diamonds	Irma Millard / Hermit of The Lagoon	Television film
1995–1999	Chicago Hope	Dr. Diane Grad	103 episodes
1996	A Brother's Promise: The Dan Jansen Story	Jane Jansen	Television film
1998	Early Edition	Dr. Diane Grad	Episode: "Mum's the Word"
1998	Mind Games	Hannah Berrick	Television film
1999–2000	Sports Night	Abby Jacobs	4 episodes
2000	Chicken Soup for the Soul	Teacher	Episode: "Footprints on My Heart/Legacy/Elopement"
2000	My Mother, the Spy	Alison Shaeffer	Television film
2000–2002	The District	Mary Ann Mitchell	14 episodes
2002	Imagine That	Wendy	6 episodes
2002–2003	John Doe	Jamie Avery	21 episodes
2003	Without a Trace	Ms. Atkins	Episode: "The Bus"
2004	The Robinsons: Lost in Space	Maureen Robinson	Television film
2004	CSI: Miami	Mia Eckhart	Episode: "Legal"
2004	Jack & Bobby	Susan Kramer	Episode: "Lost Boys"
2004	Searching for David's Heart	Claire Deeton	Television film
2005	Everwood	Mrs. Rogers	Episodes: "Pro Choice" "So Long, Farewell..."
2006	Grey's Anatomy	Gwen Graber	Episode: "Blues for Sister Someone"
2006	Boston Legal	Rachel Lewiston	4 episodes
2007	NCIS	Lyndi Crawshaw	Episode: "Cover Story"
2008	Eli Stone	Rebecca Green	Episode: "Soul Free"
2008	Private Practice	Dr. Meg Porter	5 episodes
2008–2011	Brothers & Sisters	Bertha Wandell	Episodes: "Prior Commitments" "You Get What You Need" "Never Say Never"
2009	Castle	Claudia Peterson	Episode: "Nanny McDead"
2009	The Cleaner	Michelle Durham	Episode: "Hello America"
2011	Off the Map	Lynn	Episodes: "It's Good" "Es Un Milagro"
2012–2018	Major Crimes	Vicky Landon	Episodes: Conspiracy Theory: Part 1, Conspiracy Theory: Part 2, Conspiracy Theory: Part 3, Conspiracy Theory: Part 4
2014	Revenge	Loretta Deaton	Episode: "Hatred"
2014	Rizzoli & Isles	Senator Valerie Bloomfield	Episode: "You're Gonna Miss Me When I'm Gone"
2017–2019	Star Trek: Discovery	Admiral Katrina Cornwell	12 episodes
