= Off Centre =

American sitcom television series

- Genre: Sitcom
- Created by: Chris Weitz; Paul Weitz; Danny Zuker
- Starring: Eddie Kaye Thomas; Sean Maguire; Lauren Stamile; John Cho; Jason George
- Opening theme: "Off Centre Theme" performed by Gordon Gano
- Composer: Ben Vaughn
- Country of origin: United States
- Original language: English
- No. of seasons: 2
- No. of episodes: 30 (2 unaired)

Production
- Executive producers: Warren Bell; Chris Weitz; Paul Weitz; Danny Zuker
- Producers: Franco Bario; Tim Kelleher; Andrew Miano; Dawn Urbont
- Cinematography: Tony Yarlett
- Editor: Danny White
- Camera setup: Multi-camera
- Running time: 30 minutes
- Production companies: Weitz, Weitz and Zuker; DreamWorks Television; Warner Bros. Television

Original release
- Network: The WB
- Release: October 14, 2001 – October 31, 2002

Off Centre is an American sitcom that aired on The WB network from October 14, 2001, to October 31, 2002. Created by Chris Weitz, Paul Weitz, and Danny Zuker, the series was heavily promoted as "from the guys who brought you American Pie".

== Synopsis ==
The series is centered on the lives of two twentysomething friends, British stud Euan Pierce and play-it-safe American Mike Platt, after they move into the posh Hadley Building on New York's Centre Street. Rounding out the cast are Mike's girlfriend Liz Lombardi, their wacky friend and Vietnamese restaurant owner Chau Presley, and secretly sensitive gangsta rapper Status Quo.

== Characters ==
=== Main ===
- Euan Pierce (played by Sean Maguire) – A womanizing graduate of Oxford University, suave Brit Euan works as an investment banker and is reckless with money, as seen in the lavish apartment he shares with Mike, which includes of all things, a $2,000 airplane propeller. Among the skeletons in his closet are his "fruity" middle name (Crispin) and the fact that he used to riverdance. He is loosely based on Chris Weitz's university friend and subsequent roommate Euan Rellie.
- Mike Platt (played by Eddie Kaye Thomas) – Unlike his Oxford roommate Euan, Mike is hardly financially stable, and for most of the series he works for a non-profit organization, writing letters on behalf of political prisoners, protesting overfishing of the delicious Chilean sea bass, and performing other deeds that he cares little about, as he chose the job because it was close to his apartment. Mike went on to a short-lived career at a video game company before working as the sound guy for porn films, and later into unemployment. Mike dated Liz for over a year, and his attempts to break up with her during the first episode of the second season were thwarted when she dumped him first. Before Eddie Kaye Thomas was cast as Mike, both Will Friedle (Boy Meets World) and Josh Radnor (How I Met Your Mother) were attached to the role at one time.
- Liz Lombardi (played by Lauren Stamile) – Mike's girlfriend for over a year, Liz was frequently seen trying to get Mike to better himself and take more control of his life.
- Chau Presley (played by John Cho) – Chau is Mike and Euan's Vietnamese restaurateur friend. His restaurant is called Qui Nhon. Some of his wacky antics consists of accidentally burning Mike's apartment, making money betting at illegal cock fights, and dating a homeless girl who showed signs of being insane. He is the most free-spirited of the group. He is frequently looking for new schemes to attract the ladies, some of which work (such as claiming to be an MTV director when Cribs profiled Status Quo, and starting a fake band, The Chau Project, and booking a gig, despite not having any songs), and some of which don't (buying a ferret and carrying it on his shoulder for a week). His excuses and explanations are frequently outlandish. He once claimed that Euan had a bedspread made of puppies in order to woo a contestant on The Real World away from him.
- Nathan Cole, a.k.a. Status Quo (played by Jason George) – A Grammy-Award-winning rapper often accompanied by his "posse people" MC French and DJ Cheddar. He lets down his tough facade around his friends. He secretly enjoys cooking, owned a fastidiously groomed standard poodle named D'Artagnan, is close friends with Martha Stewart and once briefly dated Cher. He had a long-time crush on Liz, but they refrained from pursuing a relationship, realizing that they couldn't risk their friendship and Scrabble games.

=== Supporting ===
- Dr. Barry Wasserman (played by Eugene Levy) – Appears in "The Unkindest Cut" and "P.P. Doc II: The Examination Continues." Wasserman is a urologist who inexplicably has a large cult following. Dedicated to his work, he calls his car "The Penismobile" (its license plate reads "PPDOC"), and he frequently has to explain to people that he's not joking. He is allegedly the urologist of choice for P.Diddy, Bruce Springsteen and Bob Dylan, which makes him irresistible to women. Wasserman moved into the Hadley building after his wife committed suicide. He frequently makes jokes about his dead wife that no one finds funny but him.
- Jordan (played by Rayne Marcus) – Introduced as a sort of female counterpart to Chau, Jordan is Liz's friend, who, according to Euan, has no social filter. Jordan says whatever is on her mind with no concern for the people around her, which creates several embarrassing situations, especially in restaurants. She and Chau briefly dated, before an argument about who was hotter - Owen Wilson (her choice) or Luke Wilson (Chau's choice) ended their relationship. She works as an assistant to Dr. Wasserman. Jordan refuses to use slang words for the notion of "sexual intercourse", instead referring to it as such or otherwise as coitus.

=== Guest stars ===
Among the show's notable guest stars are Carmen Electra (as herself), and American Pie alumni Eugene Levy (as urologist Dr. Barry Wasserman), Jason Biggs (as Rick Steve, the man with two first names) and Shannon Elizabeth (as Dawn, a girlfriend of Chau's who adores seeing him get beat up). Tanya Roberts guest-stars in one episode as an older woman who ends up dating Euan. The show has one-off appearances by Jenna Fischer in "The Backup" and Zachary Quinto in "Diddler on the Roof" before they found fame on The Office and Heroes, respectively. There is also One Tree Hill star Bethany Joy Galeotti, and Perrey Reeves in "A Cute Triangle" prior to her turn on Entourage.

== Episodes ==
=== Series overview ===
Season	Episodes	Originally released	
Season	Episodes	First released	Last released
1	21	October 14, 2001	May 19, 2002
2	9	September 19, 2002	October 31, 2002

=== Season 1 (2001–02) ===
No. overall	No. in season	Title	Directed by	Written by	Original release date	Prod. code	Viewers (millions)
1	1	"Let's Meet Mike and Euan"	Gerry Cohen	Chris Weitz & Paul Weitz and Danny Zuker	October 14, 2001	227551	2.21
Mike, a boy-next-door type, is in awe of Euan, an overly confident womanizer. The two friends move into a Manhattan apartment in a complex which is home to celebrities and the wealthy. Things seem to be as good as they can get - that is until Euan invites Mike's girlfriend, Liz, to live with them.
2	2	"Feeling Shellfish"	Mark Cendrowski	Mike Barker & Matt Weitzman	October 21, 2001	227553	2.61
Mike and Liz both contract pubic lice and Mike blames Euan whom he is sure is the cause of the infection. The condition puts a dampener on Mike and Liz's anniversary as well as Euan's date.
3	3	"Porn" "A Stroke of Genius"	Michael Lembeck	Danny Zuker	October 28, 2001	227552	2.6
Liz discovers Mike's hidden stash of XXX videos, and he is shocked when Liz is okay with it - she even offers to watch them with him. This seemingly good situation turns out to be a let-down for Mike. Euan tries to impress his jaded girlfriend.
4	4	"Trust Me or Don't Trust Me"	Gerry Cohen	Tim Kelleher	November 4, 2001	227555	1.77
Mike hits the town with Chau and Euan and turns down the advances of several woman in order to be faithful to Liz. However, Liz ends up kissing an old boyfriend that same evening.
5	5	"Euan's Brush with Love"	Shelley Jensen	Mike Barker & Matt Weitzman	November 11, 2001	227556	2.47
Euan goes on a quest to find a steady girlfriend and finds Ginger, an artist who thinks she is leeching off Euan. Status Quo's new clothing line makes him worry about his street cred. Meanwhile, Liz proves to Mike that skimpy clothing makes him uncomfortable.
6	6	"A Cute Triangle"	Shelley Jensen	Warren Bell	November 18, 2001	227557	2.7
Liz's sexy friend stays at the apartment for the weekend, getting Mike's hopes up that they might have a ménage à trois. Euan vows to remain celibate with his newest girlfriend, but lends his advice to Mike.
7	7	"Swing Me" "Swing Time"	Shelley Jensen	Dawn Urbont	November 25, 2001	227558	2.34
Mike's parents come to New York for a visit, giving Mike a chance to bond with his estranged father. Things start working out until Euan catches Mr. Platt with another woman.
8	8	""Money" or Brother Can You Spare a Ski Trip"	Mark Cendrowski	Mark Hentemann	December 9, 2001	227554	2.20
Mike takes on a second job at Chau's restaurant to try to solve his money problems. When Euan offers to help Mike out, Mike refuses, so Euan pretends to get Mike a job at his firm when in reality Euan is the one paying him.
9	9	"Marathon Man"	Mark Cendrowski	Tim Kelleher	January 6, 2002	227560	2.92
Euan is the subject of a hot rumor at work after a co-worker tells others that Euan is gay. Mike is thrilled to meet Liz's unimpressive ex-boyfriend.
10	10	"Guy Gone Wild"	Dana deVally Piazza	Dawn Urbont	January 13, 2002	227562	2.4
Mike learns about Liz's wild past and sets out to do things he missed out on when he was growing up. Things take an uncomfortable turn after Mike and Liz have sex at the office when they discover there are surveillance cameras.
11	11	"The Good, The Bad, and the Lazy"	Jeff Melman	Mike Barker & Matt Weitzman	January 20, 2002	227563	2.1
In desperate need of an enjoyable career, Mike heads to a career counselor. Meanwhile, Euan focuses his attention on his new B-movie actress neighbor.
12	12	"The Gas Crisis"	Mark Cendrowski	Warren Bell	January 27, 2002	227561	2.3
Mike becomes increasingly comfortable with Liz, which leads to behavior that Liz is not too fond of. Meanwhile, Euan avoids a woman who often breaks his heart and Status Quo works on a new song with Chau.
13	13	"Why Chau Lives Alone"	Shelley Jensen	Jim Bernstein & Michael Shipley	February 10, 2002	227567	2.1
Mike stays at Liz's for a while after he gets tired of living with Euan. To get back at Mike, Euan has Chau live in Mike's room.
14	14	"Mission Im-posse-ble"	Shelley Jensen	Mark Hentemann	February 17, 2002	227559	1.7
Status Quo fires his posse when Mike and Euan tell him they are all "yes-men". However, when Status Quo invites the neighbors to be his new posse, he treats Euan like a slave instead of a friend.
15	15	"Faking the Band"	Jeff Melman	Tim Kelleher	February 24, 2002	227564	2.34
Chau and Euan pretend to be rock stars to score women. Mike makes Liz angry when he proposes while drunk and forgets all about it.
16	16	"Hear No Evil, See No Package"	Shelley Jensen	Warren Bell & Danny Zuker	March 3, 2002	227565	3.39
Mike and Chau begin going to a gym where men often hang out in the nude. Meanwhile, Euan dates one of Liz's deaf friends, who turns out to be a lot meaner than everyone thinks.
17	17	"The Backup"	Shelley Jensen	Stephen Leff & Jim Patterson	March 31, 2002	227566	2.31
Mike warns Euan to stay way from his attractive friend, telling him that she is his "backup girl" he has if things with Liz do not work out. Meanwhile, Chau tries to win a big-screen TV in a contest.
18	18	"Mike & Liz & Chau & Jordan"	Dana deVally Piazza	Jim Bernstein & Michael Shipley	April 7, 2002	227569	1.8
Liz sets up Chau with her bizarre roommate, which facilitates a very strange romance. Meanwhile, Euan lies about his age to date a 45-year-old woman.
19	19	"Addicted to Love"	Dana deVally Piazza	Gabe Grifoni & Jake Farrow & Drew Levin	April 14, 2002	227568	1.9
Chau's new girlfriend becomes a hazard to him - gets him involved in fights, which result in Chau getting beat up by strangers. Meanwhile, Euan, Mike and Liz dog-sit Status Quo's canine.
20	20	"The Unkindest Cut"	Shelley Jensen	Warren Bell & Danny Zuker	April 21, 2002	227570	2.3
Euan is teased by Mike and Chau for having a foreskin. Euan makes an appointment with a urologist, who has a bizarre sense of humor when it comes to circumcision.
21	21	"Diddler on the Roof"	Dana deVally Piazza	Stephen Leff & Jim Patterson	May 19, 2002	227571	1.46
Euan worries about breaking up with one of MTV's The Real World cast members when he begins to think she will bad-mouth him on national television. To get her out of his life, Euan sets up a plan to have Chau steal her away from him. Mike lands a dream job of doing the sound for porn movies, but he becomes upset when he thinks Liz is hooking up with Status Quo while he works nights.

=== Season 2 (2002) ===
No. overall	No. in season	Title	Directed by	Written by	Original release date	Prod. code	Viewers (millions)
22	1	"Love is a Pain in the Ass" "Love Stings"	Shelley Jensen	Warren Bell & Danny Zuker	September 19, 2002	175351	1.99
Mike decides it's time to break up with Liz, but Mike is thrown off when she beats him to it. But when the break-up sex is over the top, Mike changes his mind and tries to keep the relationship going. Meanwhile, Euan meets a woman who is more wild in bed than he is.
23	2	"Cockfight"	Shelley Jensen	Tim Kelleher	September 26, 2002	175352	1.89
Euan and Status Quo meet a woman at a bar and fight each other for her attention. When they learn she has a twin, they compete to see who can sleep with both. Mike bets on cockfights with Chau in order to make money for Liz's birthday present.
24	3	"Unflushable" "M. Night Shyamalan's Unflushable"	Shelley Jensen	Stephen Leff & Jim Patterson	October 3, 2002	175353	2.13
Mike wows the guys when he leaves the bar with the new apartment building tenant, Carmen Electra. However, Mike's new diet causes him to clog her toilet and enlists Euan and Chau to help clear it up.
25	4	"PP Doc II" "P.P. Doc II: The Examination Continues"	Dana deVally Piazza	Bill Freiberger	October 10, 2002	175355	2.17
Mike and Euan's urologist moves into their apartment building. They worry that the doctor will hurt their game, but soon find he attracts women.
26	5	"The Deflower Half Hour"	Dana deVally Piazza	Mike Barker & Matt Weitzman	October 17, 2002	175354	1.77
Lindsay, Euan's date, announces to everyone that she wants to lose her virginity to Euan when she turns 18 at midnight. Upon hearing this, the gang have flashbacks to their first times.
27	6	"The Guys' Guys"	Dana deVally Piazza	Dawn Urbont	October 24, 2002	175356	2.33
Mike's high school friends come to visit, and their dorkiness makes Euan feel overly popular. Meanwhile, Status Quo and Liz have a date.
28	7	"Little House on the Bowery"	Shelley Jensen	Tim Kelleher	October 31, 2002	175357	1.69
Mike and Euan switch accents to test whether it's the accent that lands women or if it's Euan. Meanwhile, Chau dates a crazy homeless woman.
29	8	"Scary Sitcom"	N/A	N/A	Unaired	175358	N/A
30	9	"Chau's Hard Iced Tea"	N/A	N/A	Unaired	175359	N/A

== Ratings ==
Season	Timeslot (EDT)	Season premiere	Season finale	TV season	Rank	Viewers (in millions)
1	Sunday 9:30 p.m.	October 14, 2001	May 19, 2002	2001–2002	#155	2.3
2	Thursday 9:30 p.m.	September 19, 2002	October 31, 2002	2002	#151	2.26
