= Inside Schwartz =

Television series

- Genre: Sitcom
- Created by: Stephen Engel
- Starring: Breckin Meyer; Miriam Shor; Bryan Callen; Jennifer Irwin; Richard Kline; Dondré T. Whitfield; Maggie Lawson
- Composer: Ben Vaughn
- Country of origin: United States
- Original language: English
- No. of seasons: 1
- No. of episodes: 13 (4 unaired)

Production
- Executive producer: Stephen Engel
- Producer: John Ziffren
- Production locations: 20th Century Fox Studios; 10201 Pico Blvd., Century City, Los Angeles, California
- Cinematography: Peter Smokler
- Camera setup: Multi-camera
- Running time: 30 minutes
- Production companies: Stephen Engel Productions; NBC Studios; 20th Century Fox Television

Original release
- Network: NBC
- Release: September 27, 2001 – January 3, 2002

Inside Schwartz is an American sitcom television series created by Stephen Engel, that aired on NBC from September 27, 2001, until January 3, 2002, starring Breckin Meyer as the title character. The show was produced by 20th Century Fox Television and NBC Studios and first aired on NBC on Thursday Night at 8:30 EST.

== Plot ==
After losing a long-time girlfriend, minor-league sportscaster Adam Schwartz's (Meyer) dating life is illustrated by sports highlights (as presented by Fox Sports Net) in which various pro sports personalities appear. For instance, when Adam's date reveals that she has three children a referee appears and makes the call "Too many players on the field".

== Cast ==
- Breckin Meyer as Adam Schwartz
- Miriam Shor as Julie Hermann
- Bryan Callen as David Cobert
- Jennifer Irwin as Emily Cobert
- Richard Kline as Gene Schwartz
- Dondré T. Whitfield as William Morris (episodes 2–4, 9)
- Maggie Lawson as Eve Morris (episodes 7–8; recurring, previously)

=== Recurring ===
- Van Earl Wright as Himself
- Kevin Frazier as Himself

== Episodes ==
No.	Title	Directed by	Written by	Original release date	Prod. code	U.S. viewers (millions)
1	"Pilot"	Pamela Fryman	Stephen Engel	September 27, 2001	1AFP79	22.52
2	"Let's Go to the Videotape"	Pamela Fryman	Stephen Engel	October 4, 2001	1AFP01	20.59
3	"The Pinch Hitter"	Gil Junger	Gail Lerner	October 18, 2001	1AFP05	15.09
4	"Event Night"	Michael Lembeck	Gail Lerner & Bill Kunstler	October 25, 2001	1AFP07	16.56
5	"Comic Relief Pitcher"	Gail Mancuso	Story by : Stephen Leff & Jim Patterson; Teleplay by : Bill Kunstler	November 29, 2001	1AFP09	14.26
6	"Roommates"	Gail Mancuso	Story by : Michael Gannon & Jon Hotchkiss; Teleplay by : Jack Burditt	December 6, 2001	1AFP11	15.22
7	"Play-Action Fake Boyfriend"	Gail Mancuso	Story by : Debora Cahn; Teleplay by : Gail Lerner	December 20, 2001	1AFP10	10.57
8	"Eve's Date with Schwartz's Destiny"	Gil Junger	Jeff Lowell & Marc Sedaka	December 27, 2001	1AFP12	10.69
9	"Kissing Cousin"	Gil Junger	Stephen Leff & Jim Patterson	January 3, 2002	1AFP08	10.51
10	"It's All in the Footwork"	Gil Junger	Jim Patterson	Unaired	1AFP02	N/A
11	"Service, Schwartz?"	Gail Mancuso	Stephen Leff	Unaired	1AFP03	N/A
12	"Bless Me Father, for I Have Fired You"	Gil Junger	Stephen Engel	Unaired	1AFP04	N/A
13	"He Ain't Funny, He's My Brother"	Gail Mancuso	Stephen Engel	Unaired	1AFP06	N/A

== Cancellation ==
The series followed Friends, which was in its 8th and highest-rated season. Inside Schwartz debuted with 22.5 million viewers. Of the 9 episodes to air, 5 followed new episodes of Friends. But despite having an average household rating of 9.8 and being ranked 16th among all programs in the ratings, Inside Schwartz was cancelled as network executives believed that the valuable time slot could get higher ratings.

The time slot was filled with a new series, Leap of Faith, which aired for six episodes, and finally NBC simply aired repeat episodes of Friends which had higher ratings than either Inside Schwartz or Leap of Faith.

== Legacy ==
Prominent television writer and producer Dan Harmon cited the premiere of Inside Schwartz as a watershed moment in the history of television and the end of an era for traditional network programming.

In September of 2001 everything really changed, and the way we perceive television changed, because of a tragedy called the premiere of NBC's Inside Schwartz. It was at that point that we realized television was broken and could never be fixed.

— Dan Harmon, XOXO Festival Keynote (2012)

== See also ==
- Bananas
- Pete versus Life
