= Leap of Faith (TV series) =

- Genre: Sitcom
- Created by: Jenny Bicks
- Written by: Jenny Bicks; Becky Hartman-Edwards
- Directed by: Adam Bernstein; Alex Graves
- Starring: Sarah Paulson; Lisa Edelstein; Ken Marino; Regina King; Jill Clayburgh; Tim Meadows; Brad Rowe
- Composer: David Schwartz
- Country of origin: United States
- Original language: English
- No. of seasons: 1
- No. of episodes: 6

Production
- Camera setup: Single-camera
- Running time: 30 minutes
- Production companies: Perkins Street Productions; NBC Studios

Original release
- Network: NBC
- Release: February 28 – April 4, 2002

Leap of Faith is an American single-camera sitcom that aired on NBC in early 2002, right after Friends on NBC's Thursday comedy block at 8:30 PM EST, as part of Must See TV.

== Cast ==
- Sarah Paulson as Faith Wardwell
- Ken Marino as Andy
- Lisa Edelstein as Patty
- Tim Meadows as Lucas
- Regina King as Cynthia
- Brad Rowe as Dan Murphy
- Jill Clayburgh as Cricket Wardwell

== Episodes ==
No.	Title	Directed by	Written by	Original release date	Prod. code	Viewers (millions)
1	"Detours" "Pilot"	Nicole Holofcener	Jenny Bicks	February 28, 2002	64701	20.76
2	"Whole in One"	Michael Spiller	Jenny Bicks	March 7, 2002	64702	18.65
3	"The Balls Game"	Jenny Bicks	Becky Hartman Edwards	March 14, 2002	64704	15.19
4	"Peeps"	Eric Appel	Chris Mundy	March 21, 2002	64703	15.20
5	"The Baby Snugglers"	Jenny Bicks	Jenny Bicks & Chris Mundy	March 28, 2002	64705	14.53
6	"Carmic Behavior"	Nat Faxon	Jenny Bicks & Patty Lin	April 4, 2002	64706	14.61

== Broadcast ==
Friends was in its eighth season and was the number one show on television and ratings expectations were very high for the television that followed its timeslot. Inside Schwartz filled the time slot before Leap of Faith, but Inside Schwartz was canceled after six episodes despite averaging 14.6 million viewers. After Leap of Faith finished airing, the timeslot was ultimately filled with repeats of Friends for the rest of the season; the repeats averaged 18.6 million viewers.

== Ratings ==
The series averaged 16.5 million viewers for the season.
