= The Real Roseanne Show =

- Genre: Reality
- Starring: Roseanne Barr
- Country of origin: United States
- Original language: English
- No. of seasons: 1
- No. of episodes: 2 (+ 11 unaired)

Production
- Executive producer: R.J. Cutler
- Running time: 30 minutes
- Production company: Actual Reality Pictures

Original release
- Network: ABC
- Release: August 6 – August 13, 2003

The Real Roseanne Show is a reality show that aired briefly in 2003 about actress and comedian Roseanne Barr hosting a cooking show, called Domestic Goddess. It premiered on ABC on August 6, 2003 to 5.5 million viewers.

Domestic Goddess was scheduled to air September 20, 2003 but was canceled after Barr declared the pilot unfit to broadcast and due to her having an emergency hysterectomy, which made reshoots impossible. It would have aired on ABC Family. Although 13 episodes were ordered, The Real Roseanne Show was consequently canceled the same day after airing only two episodes.
