= Thieves (TV series) =

US television program

- Genre: Drama
- Created by: Jim Leonard
- Starring: John Stamos; Melissa George; Robert Knepper; Tone Lōc
- Country of origin: United States
- Original language: English
- No. of seasons: 1
- No. of episodes: 10 (2 unaired)

Production
- Executive producers: Anne Kopelson; Arnold Kopelson; Jim Leonard
- Producers: John Stamos; Peter Giuliano
- Running time: 42 minutes
- Production companies: Hoosier Karma; Kopelson Telemedia; Warner Bros. Television

Original release
- Network: ABC
- Release: September 28 – November 23, 2001

Thieves is an American drama television series created by Jim Leonard. The series stars John Stamos, Melissa George, Robert Knepper and Tone Lōc. The series aired on ABC from September 28 to November 23, 2001.

== Plot summary ==
After being caught, professional criminals Johnny (John Stamos) and Rita (Melissa George) make a deal with Special Agent Shue (Robert Knepper) to work for the government in exchange for jail time.

== Cast ==
- John Stamos as Johnny
- Melissa George as Rita
- Robert Knepper as Special Agent Shue
- Tone Lōc as Agent Al Trundell

== Episodes ==
No.	Title	Directed by	Written by	Original release date	Prod. code
1	"Pilot"	James Frawley	Jim Leonard	September 28, 2001	475166
The diamond heist that brings Johnny and Rita together is a trap set by the Feds, who want to take advantage of their special skills. In exchange for having the charges dropped, the thieves reluctantly agree to work for the government.
2	"Dey Got De Degas"	James Frawley	Jim Leonard	October 5, 2001	227651
Johnny and Rita dabble in forgery when they are asked to retrieve a stolen Degas painting.
3	"Liver Let Die"	Steven Robman	Becky Hartman Edwards	October 12, 2001	227652
Johnny and Rita play doctor when they have to retrieve a stolen liver.
4	"Bad Moon Rising"	James Frawley	Steven Dietz & Jim Leonard	October 19, 2001	227653
Johnny and Rita are assigned to steal an African artifact back from a museum. Meanwhile, Rita finds herself attracted to a police officer.
5	"The General"	James Frawley	Matthew Carnahan & Jim Leonard & John Mankiewicz	November 2, 2001	227655
Johnny and Rita are dispatched to a Mexican resort to bring back a general who is scheduled to testify at a hearing.
6	"Jack's Back"	James Frawley	Natalie Chaidez	November 9, 2001	227656
Johnny and Rita test a museum's security system by stealing gold coins. Also, Rita's new date comes as a surprise to Johnny.
7	"Casino"	James Frawley	Natalie Chaidez	November 16, 2001	227657
Johnny and Rita are assigned to steal a list of undercover agents from a man who committed murder to obtain the document.
8	"The Long Con"	James Frawley	Sandy Isaac	November 23, 2001	227654
Johnny and Rita have 24 hours to retrieve stolen evidence that is necessary to a racketeering case involving a champion horse breeder.
9	"The Green and the Black"	Jim Sadwith	Steven Dietz	Unaired	227658
Johnny and Rita go after his old partner, who was able to steal a plate that prints U.S. currency by using a plan that Johnny had devised 10 years earlier.
10	"Home Is Where the Heist Is"	Alan Myerson	Nelson Soler	Unaired	227659
When Johnny and Rita get an assignment to cohabitate in suburbia to recover a stolen virus, they discover just how comfortable life together could actually be.
