= Bob Patterson (TV series) =

- Genre: Sitcom
- Created by: Jason Alexander; Michael Markowitz; Peter Tilden
- Directed by: Robby Benson; Barnet Kellman
- Starring: Jason Alexander; Robert Klein; Jennifer Aspen; Chandra Wilson; Jay Paulson
- Composers: Michael Skloff; Giorgio Bertuccelli
- Country of origin: United States
- Original language: English
- No. of seasons: 1
- No. of episodes: 10 (5 unaired)

Production
- Executive producers: Peter Tilden; Ira Steven Behr; Jason Alexander; Tim Doyle; Michael Markowitz
- Camera setup: Multi-camera
- Running time: 30 minutes
- Production companies: Angel Ark Productions; Touchstone Television; 20th Century Fox Television

Original release
- Network: ABC
- Release: October 2 – October 31, 2001

Bob Patterson is an American television sitcom starring Jason Alexander, produced by Ira Steven Behr. It was directed by Robby Benson and Barnet Kellman. The series premiered on ABC on October 2, 2001, and the final episode aired on October 31 of that year. It was canceled in November 2001 after five of the ten scheduled episodes aired.

== Overview ==
The show revolves around fictitious motivational speaker Bob Patterson, "America's #3 Self Help Guru", who is popular with millions of people across America, thanks to his books I Know More Than You, I Still Know More Than You and the To the Top! franchise. Friction between his job and family occurs partly due to Bob's self-absorbed but insecure nature and complete lack of self-awareness, ironic qualities for someone whose job is supposed to be selflessly motivating others to improve their lives.

=== Use of character outside of show ===
After the show's cancellation, Alexander used the concept behind Patterson to create a similar fictional character named Donny Clay, "America's #4 Self-Help Guru." Alexander has toured the United States in character as Clay.

=== Catchphrases ===
The character of Bob Patterson had a series of catchphrases:

- "No is only yes to a different question."
- "The only thing between you and your goals is you.......and your goals."
- "You are the U in the Universe."
- "To the top!"

== Cast ==
- Jason Alexander as Bob Patterson, the main character and the namesake of the show. Despite being a self-help guru, Bob is shown to be insecure. An example is when his ex-wife Janet returns to live with Bob.
- Robert Klein as Landau, Bob's manager and friend. Despite being friends, Landau tends to upset Bob quite frequently, such as when he uses Bob's personal bathroom. He is only referred to as Landau and his first name is never revealed.
- Jennifer Aspen as Janet Patterson, Bob's ex-wife who comes back to live with him after becoming celibate. She and Bob decide to stay friends, despite her living in his house and doing personal things such as performing nude yoga in their bedroom.
- Chandra Wilson as Claudia, a wheelchair-using woman who works as a secretary for Bob. There are hints that she might be faking her disability, as shown in a scene where Bob catches Claudia standing up from her wheelchair to grab something from a top cabinet.
- Jay Paulson as Les, a co-worker and friend of Bob.
- Phil Buckman as Vic, a friend of Bob's who works with him.
- James Guidice as Jeffrey Patterson, Bob and Janet's son. Despite being in his late teens, Jeffrey is shown to not be very grown or mature and has failed to launch into manhood and is shown as lazy and crude.

== Episodes ==
No.	Title	Directed by	Written by	Original release date	Prod. code	Viewers (millions)
1	"Pilot"	Barnet Kellman	Story by : Jason Alexander & Michael Markowitz & Peter Tilden; Teleplay by : Jason Alexander & Ira Steven Behr & Tim Doyle & Peter Tilden	October 2, 2001	1AFY79	9.79
2	"Honest Bob"	Barnet Kellman	Ira Steven Behr & Peter Tilden	October 9, 2001	1AFY03	6.92
3	"Naked Bob"	Barnet Kellman	Barbie Feldman	October 16, 2001	1AFY02	7.18
4	"Awards Bob"	Barnet Kellman	Hayes Jackson	October 24, 2001	1AFY05	8.81
5	"Bathroom Bob"	Robby Benson	Brian Scully	October 31, 2001	1AFY07	7.94
6	"Family Bob"	Barnet Kellman	Brian Scully	Unaired	1AFY01	N/A
7	"Paranoid Bob"	Barnet Kellman	Justin Adler	Unaired	1AFY04	N/A
8	"Clown Bob"	Barnet Kellman	Barbie Feldman	Unaired	1AFY06	N/A
9	"Matchmaker Bob" "Mentor Bob"	Barnet Kellman	Justin Adler	Unaired	1AFY08	N/A
10	"Wheelchair Bob"	Barnet Kellman	Hayes Jackson	Unaired	1AFY09	N/A

== Reception ==
=== Critical ===
The series received poor reviews. The New York Times critic Caryn James wrote that "the series may be the season's biggest disappointment... Robert Klein yells while Mr. Alexander screeches." In a one-and-a-half-star review for USA Today, Robert Bianco called Chandra Wilson "the only person in the show you can imagine wanting to see again." Los Angeles Times reviewer Howard Rosenberg wrote: "The only character here that's amusingly written is Bob's new assistant, Claudia (Chandra Wilson)."

=== Ratings ===
Ratings for Bob Patterson were considered disappointing. The series' premiere drew 9.8 million viewers, while its final episode recorded 7.8 million viewers.
