= Emeril (TV series) =

American television series

- Genre: Sitcom
- Created by: Linda Bloodworth-Thomason
- Starring: Emeril Lagasse; Lisa Ann Walter; Sherri Shepherd; Carrie Preston; Robert Urich
- Composer: Bruce Miller
- Country of origin: United States
- Original language: English
- No. of seasons: 1
- No. of episodes: 11 (3 unaired ep., 1 unaired pilot)

Production
- Executive producers: Linda Bloodworth-Thomason; Harry Thomason; Emeril Lagasse
- Producers: Adrienne Crow; Barbara Stoll
- Editor: Leo Papin
- Camera setup: Multi-camera
- Running time: 22 minutes
- Production companies: Mozark Productions; NBC Studios

Original release
- Network: NBC
- Release: September 25 – December 11, 2001

Emeril is an American sitcom television series created by Linda Bloodworth-Thomason, starring celebrity chef Emeril Lagasse as himself. It was produced by Mozark Productions and NBC Studios and aired on Tuesday nights on NBC from September 25 to December 11, 2001, from 8:00 to 8:30 EST. A total of 10 half-hour episodes were produced over one season, but only seven aired.

== Cast ==
- Emeril Lagasse as himself
- Lisa Ann Walter as Cassandra Gilman
- Carrie Preston as B.D. Benson
- Robert Urich as Jerry McKenney
- Sherri Shepherd as Melva LeBlanc
- Tricia O'Kelley as Trish O'Connell
- Mary Page Keller as Nora Lagasse

== Development ==
Having lost her development deal at CBS, Linda Bloodworth-Thomason sought to build a show around TV chef Emeril Lagasse. ABC passed on the show, even though Lagasse was appearing at that time on Good Morning America as a food correspondent.

NBC had high hopes for the show, as it was created by the once-respected Bloodworth-Thomason; however, the show was savaged by many critics, one calling it a train wreck. Lagasse was said to be hesitant to participate in the project. The show was in the middle of filming when the September 11 terrorist attacks occurred; the show was scheduled to premiere on September 18, a week after the attacks, but was delayed by a week. Despite this, the opening sequence still featured the World Trade Center towers standing. Those involved with the show blamed the continuous news coverage of the terrorist attacks as the reason the show was never able to find much of an audience. Others blamed its non-acting leading man and unfunny scripts. The sitcom quietly went off the air by December 2001, with seven of its 10 episodes having been aired.

Bloodworth-Thomason had planned for the show to be "a very sophisticated, grown up comedy" that would "do for men what the women did for Designing Women." However, a regime change at NBC left the show without any defenders at executive levels.

After the poorly received first pilot, the show was revamped turning the focus from Emeril's fictionalized home life to life on the set of a fictional version of Lagasse's Food Network show. A food stylist was added to the cast, as well as the additional casting of Robert Urich as Emeril's agent. The show was produced by Mozark Studios in association with NBC Studios.

The kitchen on the show was fully functional, and Lagasse would cook for the cast and staff.

== Episodes ==
No.	Title	Directed by	Written by	Original release date	Prod. code
1	"Fat"	Harry Thomason	Dan Cohen & F.J. Pratt	September 25, 2001	103
2	"Fifteen Minutes"	Harry Thomason	Pamela Norris	October 2, 2001	106
3	"Blind Dates"	Harry Thomason	David Nichols	October 9, 2001	104
4	"Whose Life Is It Anyway?"	Harry Thomason	Linda Bloodworth-Thomason	October 16, 2001	101
5	"The Sopranos Come to Dinner"	Harry Thomason	Linda Bloodworth-Thomason	October 23, 2001	102
6	"Halloween"	Harry Thomason	Linda Bloodworth-Thomason	October 30, 2001	107
7	"The Sidekick"	Harry Thomason	Dan Cohen & F.J. Pratt	December 11, 2001	110
8	"Snow Day"	Harry Thomason	Pamela Norris	Unaired	108
9	"The Retreat"	Harry Thomason	Pamela Norris	Unaired	105
10	"One Man's Cornbread"	Harry Thomason	Cheri Steinkellner & Bill Steinkellner	Unaired	109

== Reception ==
The E! show 101 Biggest Celebrity Oops ranked the sitcom at No. 51. The LA Times called the show "pretty dreadful." USA Today was kinder to the show, giving it 2 1/2 out of 4 stars. The review cited the show's improvement, stating that it may yet be a great sitcom and "but it's moving in the right direction, notch by notch. Like many series of late, this sitcom for star cable chef Emeril Lagasse has gone through a near-total overhaul since its barely-a-work-in-progress pilot was previewed to general dismay". The Complete Directory to Prime Time Network and Cable TV Shows 1946–Present noted that show was at its best when Emeril was cooking.

== Awards ==
The show received a Primetime Emmy nomination for Art Direction for a Multi-Camera Series.

== In popular culture ==
The retooling of the show was parodied on the October 13, 2001 episode of Saturday Night Live. The show was also referenced on MADtv in a sketch starring comedian Christopher Titus.
