= Wednesday 9:30 (8:30 Central) =

2002 American sitcom

- Also known as: My Adventures in Television
- Genre: Sitcom
- Created by: Peter Tolan
- Written by: David J. Baldy; Jenji Kohan; Lesly Lieberman; Daphne Pollon; Peter Tolan; Mike Martineau
- Directed by: Robert Berlinger; Peter Tolan; Ted Wass
- Starring: Ivan Sergei; Melinda McGraw; Ed Begley Jr. James Michael McCauley; John Cleese
- Theme music composer: Peter Tolan; Christopher Tyng
- Composer: Christopher Tyng
- Country of origin: United States
- Original language: English
- No. of seasons: 1
- No. of episodes: 6 (1 unaired)

Production
- Executive producers: Lauren Corrao; Peter Tolan
- Producers: Mike Martineau; Michael Petok; Shari Tavey
- Running time: 22–24 minutes
- Production companies: The Cloudland Company; Touchstone Television

Original release
- Network: ABC
- Release: March 27 – June 12, 2002

Wednesday 9:30 (8:30 Central) (later retitled My Adventures in Television) is an American sitcom which aired on ABC in 2002. The series was created by Peter Tolan.

== Plot ==
Idealistic television executive David Weiss joins struggling TV network IBS, only to discover it is a place of backstabbing, constant competition, and a fair bit of bad programming. His colleagues include: Mike McClaren, an exec who will do anything to get ahead in the business, including hiding his own homosexuality; Lindsay Urich, an air-head who gets by on her looks; Joanne Walker, who exists as the token black person at the network; and head of programming Paul Weffler, who has an ability to get things done but is so clueless that often it is by accident. Overseeing them all is the president of the network, Red Lansing, whose orders – no matter how far-fetched – are always right.

The series didn't shy away from surprising storylines. Episode one featured David sleeping with Lori Loughlin which caused a scandal at the network; episode three – "Death Be Not Pre-Empted" – featured the team going after ratings by airing the execution of a serial killer, and episode six revolved around David's attempt to please all sorts of minority groups without displeasing others.

== Cast ==
- Ivan Sergei as David Weiss
- Melinda McGraw as Lindsay Urich
- Ed Begley Jr. as Paul Weffler
- Sherri Shepherd as Joanne Walker
- James Michael McCauley as Mike McClaren
- John Cleese as Red Lansing

== Production ==
The series was a mid-season replacement, premiering on Wednesday, March 27, 2002 at (unsurprisingly) 9:30 p.m. Eastern and Pacific times, 8:30 Central Time – with the title being a play on the common U.S. network practice of promoting both airtimes. Series creator Peter Tolan had earlier written The Larry Sanders Show, Ellen and Murphy Brown. The series was able to attract big-name guest stars, such as Lori Loughlin, John Ritter, Garry Shandling and Lisa Rinna, who all appeared as themselves in the first few episodes. However, low ratings caused ABC to put the series on hiatus after just two episodes, and ultimately cancel it.

Three more episodes appeared after the May sweeps were over; on May 29, 2002, the show returned to its Wednesday 9:30/8:30 time slot, under the new title My Adventures in Television. The remaining produced episode never aired.

== Episodes ==
No.	Title	Directed by	Written by	Original release date	Prod. code
1	"Pilot"	Ted Wass	Peter Tolan	March 27, 2002	W–111
2	"The Art of Groveling"	Ted Wass	David J. Baldy	April 3, 2002	W–116
3	"Death Be Not Pre-Empted"	Robert Berlinger	Daphne Pollon	May 29, 2002	W–115
4	"Chinese Baby"	Peter Tolan	Jenji Kohan	June 5, 2002	W–113
5	"Fired"	Ted Wass	Lesly Lieberman	June 12, 2002	W–112
6	"Diversity"	TBD	Mike Martineau	UNAIRED	W–114
