= ElimiDate =

- Genre: Reality television
- Narrated by: Dale Inghram
- Country of origin: United States
- Original language: English
- No. of seasons: 6
- No. of episodes: 857

Production
- Producer: Alex Duda
- Running time: 30 minutes
- Production companies: AND Syndicated Productions; Telepictures Productions

Original release
- Network: Syndication
- Release: September 17, 2001 – May 24, 2006

Related
- Blind Date

ElimiDate is an American reality television dating show in which one contestant chooses between four contestants of the opposite sex by eliminating them one by one in three rounds. On August 11, 2006, it was announced that the show would not be renewed for the 2006–07 season due to low ratings, and it went out of syndication after September 5, 2006.

The syndicated program premiered on 17 September 2001 and was produced by AND Syndicated Productions in association with Telepictures Productions, and distributed by Telepictures Distribution (2001–03) and Warner Bros. Television Distribution (2003–06). It was produced by Alex Duda. The narrator was Dale Inghram.

Nationwide in the United States, it was broadcast on cable late nights on Superstation WGN. ElimiDate was also available on AOL's free video-streaming channel, In2TV, until it was shut down.

The show was popular due to being designed to be aired around or past midnight, when its target audience was just coming home from being out or ending their studies for the evening. It developed a cult following of sorts among college students nationwide.

== Format ==
The reality television dating show features one contestant who chooses from four contestants of the opposite sex by eliminating them one by one in three rounds. The contestant (sometimes female, but usually male) meets their four dates one by one, and then gives their first impression in a confessional-style cut scene. The other four contestants then size each other up along with the contestant within their own confessional scenes.

The group of five is cut one-by-one each round, and in each round the group usually goes to a different place. The show starts out in the late afternoon at a public place (e.g. a city park or restaurant). Then, when there are only two suitors left, the setting moves to a hot tub or VIP area of a club, where sex acts may happen.

Initially, episodes rotated between Los Angeles, Miami, and New York City, but the program's popularity encouraged the producers to film episodes in other cities. Episodes were filmed in over three dozen cities, including Atlanta, Baltimore, Chicago, Columbus, Little Rock, St. Paul, Jacksonville, Phoenix, Raleigh and Sacramento, and syndicators usually received strong support from affiliate stations to find contestants for the series within their cities through casting calls.

== ElimiDate Deluxe ==
A short-lived spinoff version called ElimiDate Deluxe aired concurrently in primetime on the WB with the first two episodes airing back-to-back the same day on October 11, 2001 while its third and final episode aired on October 25, 2001. The format was the same as the regular version, except it took place to exotic and glamorous locations where the daters would participate in four adventurous activities throughout the course of the show. It was dropped after three episodes because of poor ratings.

== British version ==
In 2002, a short-lived British version aired on ITV, unlike its American counterpart, it had a presenter by former Atomic Kitten singer Kerry Katona (formerly McFadden). It generated some controversy when contestant Donovan Russell lodged a complaint with the Broadcasting Standards Commission alleging that the programme was "fixed" and contestants were told in advance who to pick. Although the complaint was not upheld, the series was dropped midway through its run.The series aired for eight episodes in total from July 4 to August 28, 2002.
