= Imagine That (TV series) =

- Genre: Sitcom
- Created by: Seth Kurland
- Starring: Hank Azaria; Jayne Brook; Joshua Malina; Katey Sagal
- Composer: Rick Marotta
- Country of origin: United States
- Original language: English
- No. of seasons: 1
- No. of episodes: 6 (4 unaired)

Production
- Camera setup: Multi-camera
- Running time: 30 minutes
- Production companies: Seth Kurland Productions; Touchstone Television; Columbia TriStar Domestic Television

Original release
- Network: NBC
- Release: January 8 – January 15, 2002

Imagine That is an American sitcom television series created by Seth Kurland that aired from January 8 until January 15, 2002 on NBC. The series starred Hank Azaria, Jayne Brook, Joshua Malina and Katey Sagal, and was produced by Seth Kurland Productions, Touchstone Television and Columbia TriStar Domestic Television.

== Premise ==
A comedy writer uses his Walter Mitty-like fantasies as inspiration for his show.

== Cast ==
- Hank Azaria as Josh Miller
- Jayne Brook as Wendy Miller
- Joshua Malina as Kenny Fleck
- Katey Sagal as Barb Thompson
- Suzy Nakamura as Rina Oh
- Julia Schultz as Tabitha Applethorpe
- David Pressman as Seth Koozman

== Episodes ==
No.	Title	Directed by	Written by	Original release date
1	"The Macho Therapist"	Barnet Kellman	Seth Kurland	January 8, 2002
Josh is inspired to write a sketch after seeing a marriage counselor with his wife.
2	"The Married Balladeer"	Barnet Kellman	Tad Quill	January 15, 2002
Josh is stressed out by marital therapy.
3	"Lucy"	TBD	TBD	Unaired
Josh imagines himself as Lucy Ricardo when Wendy's dad comes for a visit.
4	"The Inner Critic"	TBD	TBD	Unaired
Josh is taunted by his inner critic.
5	"The Psychic"	TBD	TBD	Unaired
Josh goes to see a flamboyant psychic.
6	"Mary Mary Mary"	TBD	TBD	Unaired
