= Houston Medical =

- Narrated by: Jeff Colt
- Country of origin: United States
- Original language: English
- No. of seasons: 1
- No. of episodes: 6

Production
- Running time: 60 minutes
- Production company: Greengrass Productions

Original release
- Network: ABC
- Release: June 18 – July 23, 2002

Houston Medical is an American documentary series that aired from June 18, 2002 to July 23, 2002.

== Premise ==
The lives of staffers and patients at Memorial Hermann–Texas Medical Center in Houston, Texas are followed over the course of a year.

== Episodes ==
No.	Title	Original release date
1	TBA	June 18, 2002
A hand specialist has a unique alternative for an accident victim. A pediatric nurse explains why he wants a career in medicine. Two boys are born prematurely.
2	TBA	June 25, 2002
A medical student who grew up with little money wants to become a doctor. A resident loses a patient. A hand surgeon considers starting a family with his wife.
3	TBA	July 2, 2002
A motorcycle cop gets injured in the line of duty. A medical student has a career crisis. A doctor and her husband has a unique relationship.
4	TBA	July 9, 2002
A teenager's life is in danger. A paramedic proposes to his girlfriend. A woman prepares for the treatment of a tumor. A pediatrician's reputation is about to be ruined.
5	TBA	July 16, 2002
A woman recovers from a motorcycle accident. A doctor treats a boy with epilepsy. A doctor returns to work after treatment of brain cancer.
6	TBA	July 23, 2002
A doctor continues her fight against brain cancer. A high school quarterback hopes to return to the field after an injury. A surgeon might get life-altering news.
