= Love Cruise =

2001 reality television series

- Genre: Reality television
- Presented by: Justin Gunn
- Country of origin: United States
- Original language: English
- No. of seasons: 1
- No. of episodes: 7

Production
- Executive producers: Jonathan Murray; Mary-Ellis Bunim
- Production location: Caribbean
- Running time: 41–42 minutes
- Production company: Bunim/Murray Productions

Original release
- Network: Fox
- Release: September 21 – October 16, 2001

Love Cruise: The Maiden Voyage is an American reality television series broadcast by the Fox Broadcasting Company (Fox). The series premiered on September 21, 2001, and concluded with its seventh episode on October 16, 2001.

The show featured 16 singles (8 men, and 8 women) competing for a $250,000 prize on a cruise. The original premiere date of the show was September 11, 2001 but it was delayed to ten days from its intended broadcast due to news coverage of the 9/11 attacks.

== Production ==
The contestants were all required to undergo medical and psychological evaluations prior to their participation in the series.
