= Under One Roof (2002 TV series) =

- Developed by: Endemol
- Presented by: Rob Nelson
- Country of origin: United States
- No. of episodes: 7 (3 aired, 4 unaired)

Production
- Executive producer: Bruce Toms

Original release
- Network: UPN
- Release: March 21 – July 2, 2002

Under One Roof is a 2002 American reality show that aired on UPN from March 21 to July 2, 2002. Hosted by Rob Nelson, the show's premise was to pit five families against each other to win a Fijian beachfront house.

== Overview ==
In each episode the families would win a number of ribbons based on their rank in competition. Prior to the ribbon competition, another competition allowed the winning family to choose either an advantage in the ribbon contest, or a valuable prize. If the prize was selected, the second place family would receive the advantage. Every two episodes, the family with the fewest ribbons would be sent home, and the scores would be reset so that all families would again be on an equal footing for the next elimination. The winning family was decided in a single head-to-head competition with no advantage competition.

UPN has been criticized for having canceled the show, not once, but twice. After the first two episodes – aired in March and April – fared poorly in the ratings, the show was cancelled. It was brought back again in July as a summer replacement, repeating the first two episodes and airing the third, only to be cancelled again. The final four episodes never aired.

Due to the cancelation of the show, it was unknown if the winners would still receive the house. A standard game show eligibility clause states that the awarding of prizes may be revoked in the event that the episode does not air. Senior Vice President of UPN Joanne Lowry, said that all prizes, including the house that was built, have already been rewarded and will be able to be kept. Although it was never shown on TV, a representative from UPN said the winning family was the Skofields from Las Vegas.

== Cast ==
The five families that competed were:

- The Skofields (Mike, Holly, Matt, Brittany) (winners)

Michael Allen Skofield aka Michael Alin passed away in Costa Rica where he ran a site called "Travel Costa Rica Now", in the past month. https://travelcostaricanow.com/ and https://www.youtube.com/@TravelCostaRicaNOW

- The Hatmakers (Michelle, Jonathan, Daniel, and family friend Mark Anderson) (2nd place)
- The McRaes (Larry, Jeanell, Kirsten, Shannon, Trent) (3rd place)
- The Paganis (Jorge, Robin, Marchela, Giancarlo, Bianca) (4th place)
- The Distels (David, Lyn, Melissa, Mike) (5th place)
