= 2002 in American television =

In American television in 2002, notable events included television series debuts, finales, cancellations, and new channel initiations.

== Events ==
=== January ===
Date	Event
1	KRON-TV/San Francisco ends its affiliation with NBC after 52 years and becomes an independent station after Young Broadcasting, which purchased the station for $823 million in November 1999 from the deYoung family (who also sold the San Francisco Chronicle to the Hearst Corporation), refuses to agree to demands made by NBC to manage KRON under the conventions of a network-owned station (which included rebranding from "KRON 4" to "NBC 4", and airing the entire network schedule in pattern with pre-emptions reduced to those necessitated due to extended breaking news coverage). San Jose-based WB affiliate KNTV (which served as the ABC affiliate for the South Bay from 1960 until 2000, when it agreed to disaffiliate at the request of the Bay Area's primary ABC station, O&O KGO-TV) assumes the NBC affiliation and soon afterward is sold to the network by the Granite Broadcasting Corporation, whose remaining Bay Area station, KBWB-TV (now independent station KOFY-TV), consequently became the market's sole WB affiliate.
5	Soul Train airs its 1,000th episode. Faith Evans, Rayvon, and Mack 10 performed.
14	The Church Channel launches.
17	The Price Is Right tapes its 30th Anniversary Special broadcast in Las Vegas, and it was broadcast by CBS January 31.

=== February ===
Date	Event
3	Super Commercials: A Mental Engineering Special is broadcast by PBS member stations reaching 85% of the U.S. after Super Bowl XXXVI; reportedly the best coverage yet achieved by a former public-access television program.
3	Pat Summerall calls his 26th and final Super Bowl overall for television and radio. This was also the eighth final Super Bowl telecast (and final NFL telecast of any kind) to be called by Summerall and John Madden. The duo called five for CBS and three for Fox. The New England Patriots win their first championship ever against the St. Louis Rams, leading a start of their dynasty.
8	The opening ceremony of the 2002 Winter Olympics are televised by NBC.
8	In the wake of the September 11 terrorist attacks, WNBC in New York City revives the We're 4 New York campaign.
13	The UPN series Special Unit 2 airs its 19th and final episode. One of the guest stars in this episode was a then-19-year old Canadian actress by the name of Cobie Smulders, who would go on to star in the CBS series How I Met Your Mother alongside Josh Radnor and Jason Segel 3 years later.
14	CBS buys KCAL (channel 9) in Los Angeles, California from Young Broadcasting for $650 million, making it a sister station to KCBS channel 2.
14	The final Family Guy episode airs after Fox announces its cancellation (however, record DVD sales and high ratings in syndication convince Fox to bring it back in 2005).
18	JCTV launches.

=== March ===
Date	Event
1	Sesame Street broadcasts its 4,000th episode.
10	CBS broadcasts a commercial-free documentary TV movie about the September 11 attacks, without edits to content or language.
22	Chalkzone premieres on Nickelodeon with the first episode, "Rudy's First Adventure"/"Rudy's Story", and becomes a big hit.
25	The first WWF draft lottery is broadcast live on the Spike TV show Raw, causing a split between the two brands Raw and SmackDown.

=== April ===
Date	Event
1	Noggin refocuses its daytime programming towards preschoolers, debuting Play with Me Sesame and Tiny Planets, and launches The N, a nighttime block for teenagers.
15	The 63rd and final episode of Once and Again is broadcast by ABC. This would mark Evan Rachel Wood's final appearance as a main cast member on a television series until Westworld premieres on HBO in 2016.
17	The ABC soap opera General Hospital broadcasts its milestone 10,000th episode.
19	Tribune Broadcasting buys WB affiliate WTTV (channel 4) in Bloomington, Indiana and its translator WTTK (channel 29) in Kokomo, Indiana from Sinclair for $125 million.
24	C-SPAN airs a concert performed by Michael Jackson at the Apollo Theater in New York City. The concert is a fundraiser for the Democratic National Committee and former President Bill Clinton. This would ultimately, prove to be Jackson's final on-stage performance.
29	Donovan Patton replaces Steve Burns as the second host of Nick Jr.'s live-action animated children's television series Blue's Clues in a three-part special.

=== May ===
Date	Event
1-14	Jeopardy! hosted a Million Dollar Masters Tournament held at Radio City Music Hall in commemoration of host Alex Trebek's 4,000th episode. Brad Rutter won the tournament aired May 14 and the $1,000,000 grand prize. The day after the finals, Jeopardy! celebrates the airing of Trebek's 4,000th episode in syndication.
5	NBC broadcasts a three-hour 75th anniversary special.
6	One Life to Live broadcasts a full week of episodes broadcast live from the ABC New York studios.
6	The first Monday Night Raw episode under the World Wrestling Entertainment name is broadcast after following a lawsuit by the World Wildlife Fund for the initials "WWF".
13	TV Guide's 50 Greatest TV Shows of All Time is presented by ABC.
17	The 29th Daytime Emmy Awards are broadcast by CBS.
19	In CBS, Vecepia Towery was named the Sole Survivor in Survivor: Marquesas. That episode was also panned with criticism over the infamous tiebreaker dubbed "Purple Rock" leading to the elimination of frontrunner Paschal English. As of today, this is the last reunion special hosted by someone other than the host Jeff Probst, Rosie O'Donnell hosted the special.
22	The Rosie O'Donnell Show airs its last live episode.

=== June ===
Date	Event
12	NBC broadcasts its last NBA game after 12 years with the league. The network will not broadcast another NBA game until the 2025–26 season.
16	The Dead Zone premieres on USA Network, with the highest ratings of a cable series debut in history.
18	FX broadcasts a "lost episode" of Married... with Children entitled "I'll See You in Court". Produced during the show's third season (1988–89), the episode was pulled from Fox's schedule due conflicts between the show's producers and the network over its content.
27	Fox Television Stations acquire WPWR-TV from Newsweb Corporation.

=== July ===
Date	Event
4	ABC broadcasts a three-hour primetime news special, entitled In Search of America: Celebration.
13	Fox News Channel overtakes CNN as the #1-rated news channel.
15	After negotiations concerning a new affiliation agreement with CBS fail, WJXT (channel 4) in Jacksonville, Florida becomes an independent station on this date, with former UPN affiliate WTEV-TV (channel 47) assuming the market's CBS affiliation. This also results in an affiliation change in nearby Gainesville (where WJXT had long been the market's default CBS affiliate), as WB/UPN affiliate WGFL joins CBS (giving the Gainesville market its first-ever CBS affiliate).

=== August ===
Date	Event

=== September ===
Date	Event
1	Clear Channel reverts the KMOL-TV branding in San Antonio back to the WOAI-TV branding, since Clear Channel traded WFTC to Fox in return for two network-based affiliates originally by Chris Craft, KTVX, and KMOL.
2	Disney Channel stops broadcasting its afternoon and late night programming blocks "Zoog Disney" and "Vault Disney".
2	In Portland, Oregon, the Meredith Corporation's duopoly of UPN affiliate KPTV and Fox affiliate KPDX (which Fox had sold to Meredith on June 17 in exchange for WOFL in Orlando, Florida and its semi-satellite in Gainesville, WOGX) swap affiliations.
2	KPSP-LP in Palm Springs, California signs-on the air, giving the Coachella Valley its first-ever CBS affiliate.
4	Kelly Clarkson wins the first season of Fox's reality series American Idol.
7	Fox Kids (which had been on the air since 1990) airs for the final time, as Fox had sold the block's program library to Disney, parent company of rival network ABC. It was replaced the following week (on September 14) by the 4Kids-programmed FoxBox.
8	In Minneapolis-St. Paul, MN, Fox O&O WFTC swaps affiliations with sister station and UPN affiliate KMSP-TV, due to Fox's desire to place their programming on a stronger station (in addition to being on VHF, KMSP-TV has higher ratings, a stronger signal, and a well-established news department).
9	John Madden officially makes his debut as the new color commentator for Monday Night Football on ABC. Madden's first regular season broadcast was a game in New England between the Patriots and the Pittsburgh Steelers. Working alongside Al Michaels, Madden would later that season, be in the booth for ABC's broadcast of Super Bowl XXXVII from San Diego. Madden would become the first person to do televised color commentary for two consecutive Super Bowls on two different networks (having previously called Super Bowl XXXVI for Fox).
14	Major upheavals take place on Saturday mornings, as three of the four major networks change their programming on this day, with NBC preparing to do the same. Fox, having sold Fox Kids Worldwide to The Walt Disney Company the previous year, ends Fox Kids and sells its airtime to 4Kids Entertainment, who begins programming their new children's programming block FoxBox. Disney, having acquired Fox Kids' program library, re-launches Disney's One Saturday Morning on ABC as ABC Kids. CBS, whose then and now-corporate sibling Nickelodeon programs its lineup, rebrands its Nick Jr. on CBS block as Nick on CBS and refocuses it on 2–11 year old children.
16	Sony Pictures Entertainment rebranded the television unit of Columbia TriStar Domestic Television into its proper name, Sony Pictures Television (which could bring Sony's upcoming future series, as well as Sony distributed shows, and classic shows from the Screen Gems Television/Columbia Pictures Television library to be under the Sony Television unit as a whole). The new Sony Pictures Television unit would produce the remaining Columbia TriStar programs under the Sony name that were renewed for the 2002-2003 TV season (which includes well-known series, Days of Our Lives, The Young and the Restless, Wheel of Fortune, Jeopardy!, etc.).
17	Release date of Kelly Clarkson's debut single, the double-A side CD "A Moment Like This"/"Before Your Love".
22	Two NBC programs, Friends and The West Wing, respectively win Outstanding Comedy Series and Outstanding Drama Series at the 54th Primetime Emmy Awards, which, by coincidence, airs on NBC.
25	Lisa Donahue is the winner of CBS's contest Big Brother 3 and wins the $500,000 prize; runner-up Danielle Reyes wins $50,000.
30	American Movie Classics's transition to a commercial-supported general movie channel is completed with a new brand identity.
30	Disney Channel, Playhouse Disney, and Toon Disney unveil their new logos and graphics.

=== October ===
Date	Event
5	NBC, having signed a contract with Discovery Networks, replaces their teen-oriented block TNBC with a programming strand called Discovery Kids on NBC (a spinoff of digital cable channel Discovery Kids).
14	Nickelodeon debuts its weekly programming variety block U-Pick Live.
17	Four television stations debut in Guam carrying programming from the Trinity Broadcasting Network: K28HS, K30HB, K32GB, and K36GJ. All four stations will become translators of NBC affiliate KUAM-TV in 2007.
25	CBS News weatherman Mark McEwen leaves after 15 years.
27	Game 7 of the World Series is broadcast on Fox. The Anaheim Angels win their first championship by defeating the San Francisco Giants.
30	Warren Zevon is featured on CBS's Late Show with David Letterman as the only guest for the entire hour, performing several songs and talking about being diagnosed with inoperable lung cancer.
30	Longtime cast member Hunter Tylo's character, Dr. Taylor Hamilton Forrester, is killed in the CBS soap opera The Bold and the Beautiful.
30	The NBA on ESPN returned for the first time since the 1983–84 season, featuring a doubleheader between the Washington Wizards and the Toronto Raptors, and the Los Angeles Lakers and the Portland Trail Blazers.

=== November ===
Date	Event
20	The 2002 Victoria's Secret Fashion Show is broadcast on CBS. 10.5 million people tune in.

=== December ===
Date	Event
25	The NBA on ABC returned for the first time since the 1972–73 season, broadcasting a Christmas Day doubleheader between the Boston Celtics and the New Jersey Nets, and the Sacramento Kings and the Los Angeles Lakers.

== Programs ==
=== Debuts ===
Date	Show	Network
January 2	The Crocodile Hunter Diaries	Animal Planet
January 8	Last Call with Carson Daly	NBC
January 8	Imagine That	NBC
January 13	The Jamie Kennedy Experiment	The WB
January 13	The Chamber	Fox
January 15	The Chair	ABC
January 15	First Monday	CBS
January 16	Combat Missions	USA Network
January 16	Glory Days	The WB
January 18	NOW	PBS
January 19	The Nick Cannon Show	Nickelodeon
January 19	Teamo Supremo	ABC
January 19	DragonflyTV	PBS Kids
January 21	Cyberchase	PBS Kids
January 23	American Family	PBS
January 23	That '80s Show	Fox
February 4	Morning Call	CNBC
February 4	Closing Bell	CNBC
February 9	Galidor: Defenders of the Outer Dimension	Fox Kids
February 9	Power Rangers Wild Force	Fox Kids
February 12	On the Record	Fox News Channel
February 24	Inside TV Land	Nick at Nite
February 26	Watching Ellie	NBC
February 28	Leap of Faith	NBC
March 3	Jeremiah	Showtime
March 4	Late World with Zach	VH1
March 5	The Osbournes	MTV
March 5	As If	UPN
March 5	The Random Years	UPN
March 11	The American Embassy	Fox
March 12	The Shield	FX
March 14	My Guide to Becoming a Rock Star	The WB
March 18	Baby Bob	CBS
March 19	Yankeeography	YES Network
March 19	Andy Richter Controls the Universe	Fox
March 21	Under One Roof	UPN
March 22	ChalkZone	Nickelodeon
March 25	The Bachelor	ABC
March 26	The Court	ABC
March 27	George Lopez	ABC
March 27	Wednesday 9:30 (8:30 Central)	ABC
March 27	Greg the Bunny	Fox
March 29	AFP: American Fighter Pilot	CBS
April 1	$40 a Day	Food Network
April 1	Play with Me Sesame	Noggin
April 4	Opportunity Knocks	PAX TV
April 7	Super Duper Sumos	Nickelodeon
April 15	Whammy! The All-New Press Your Luck	Game Show Network
April 22	Made	MTV
May 1	Arena	G4
May 1	Blister	G4
May 1	Cheat!	G4
May 1	Cinematech	G4
May 1	Filter	G4
May 1	Game On	G4
May 1	Icons	G4
May 1	Players	G4
May 1	Portal	G4
May 1	Pulse	G4
May 1	Signing Time!	Direct-to-video
May 3	Max & Ruby	Nickelodeon
May 6	Taildaters	MTV
May 24	WWE Afterburn	Syndication
May 24	WWE Bottom Line	Syndication
May 25	WWE Velocity	TNN
May 25	Phantom Investigators	Kids' WB
June 2	The Wire	HBO
June 3	Crank Yankers	Comedy Central
June 3	Friend or Foe?	Game Show Network
June 3	Russian Roulette	Game Show Network
June 7	Kim Possible	Disney Channel
June 10	I Bet You Will	MTV
June 11	American Idol	Fox
June 12	World Music	Link TV
June 16	The Dead Zone	USA Network
June 17	Dog Eat Dog	NBC
June 18	Houston Medical	ABC
June 21	Def Poetry Jam	HBO
June 21	Odyssey 5	Showtime
June 23	Street Time	Showtime
June 23	Monster Garage	Discovery Channel
June 23	Totally in Tune	Disney Channel
June 24	Sorority Life	MTV
July 6	While You Were Out	TLC
July 7	The Most Extreme	Animal Planet
July 11	Wide Angle	PBS
July 12	Monk	USA Network
July 17	30 Seconds To Fame	Fox
July 17	Breaking News	Bravo
July 19	Whatever Happened to... Robot Jones?	Cartoon Network
July 20	The Adventures of Jimmy Neutron, Boy Genius	Nickelodeon
July 20	She Spies	NBC
July 21	For the People	Lifetime
July 22	Meet My Folks	NBC
July 29	One-Hit Wonders	VH1
August 1	The Rerun Show	NBC
August 1	Contest Searchlight	Comedy Central
August 1	Cavuto on Business	Fox News Channel
August 6	A Haunting	Discovery Channel
August 12	Studio B with Shepard Smith	Fox News Channel
August 16	He-Man and the Masters of the Universe	Cartoon Network
August 17	¡Mucha Lucha!	Kids' WB
August 25	Nickelodeon Robot Wars	Nickelodeon
September 2	The Caroline Rhea Show	Syndication
September 2	Liberty's Kids	PBS Kids
September 2	Make Way For Noddy	PBS Kids
September 12	Family Affair	The WB
September 14	What's New, Scooby-Doo?	Kids' WB
September 14	Ozzy & Drix	Kids' WB
September 14	Fillmore!	ABC Kids
September 14	Stargate Infinity	FoxBox
September 15	Just Cause	PAX TV
September 16	Baby Looney Tunes	Cartoon Network
September 16	Beyond with James Van Praagh	Syndication
September 16	The Daily Buzz	Syndication
September 16	Dr. Phil	Syndication
September 16	The Rob Nelson Show	Syndication
September 16	Everwood	The WB
September 16	Body and Soul	PAX TV
September 17	8 Simple Rules	ABC
September 17	Life with Bonnie	ABC
September 17	Push, Nevada	ABC
September 17	Beg, Borrow & Deal	ESPN
September 18	Cedric the Entertainer Presents	Fox
September 18	Fastlane	Fox
September 19	Do Over	The WB
September 20	Greetings from Tucson	The WB
September 20	What I Like About You	The WB
September 20	Firefly	Fox
September 20	John Doe	Fox
September 22	The Chris Matthews Show	Syndication
September 22	O2Be	Oxygen
September 23	CSI: Miami	CBS
September 23	Half & Half	UPN
September 24	Haunted	UPN
September 24	Hidden Hills	NBC
September 24	In-Laws	NBC
September 24	Presidio Med	CBS
September 25	MDs	ABC
September 26	Good Morning, Miami	NBC
September 26	Without a Trace	CBS
September 27	Hack	CBS
September 27	Robbery Homicide Division	CBS
September 27	That Was Then	ABC
September 28	Biker Build-Off	Discovery Channel
September 29	American Dreams	NBC
September 29	Boomtown	NBC
September 30	Recipe TV Featuring the World's Greatest Chefs	Syndication
September 30	Still Standing	CBS
September 30	Taboo	National Geographic Channel
October 1	Less Than Perfect	ABC
October 5	TNA Xplosion	Sunshine Network
October 5	Croc Files	Discovery Kids on NBC
October 5	Endurance	Discovery Kids on NBC
October 5	Operation Junkyard	Discovery Kids on NBC
October 5	Scout's Safari	Discovery Kids on NBC
October 5	Strange Days at Blake Holsey High	Discovery Kids on NBC
October 5	Prehistoric Planet	Discovery Kids on NBC
October 6	Bram & Alice	CBS
October 9	Birds of Prey	The WB
October 9	Unsolved History	Discovery Channel
October 13	Sue Thomas: F.B.Eye	PAX TV
October 14	U-Pick Live	Nickelodeon
October 21	Girls Club	Fox
October 22	Scaredy Camp	Nickelodeon
October 28	Page to Screen	Bravo
October 30	3-South	MTV
November 2	Clone High	MTV
November 4	Around the Horn	ESPN
November 7	3-South	MTV
November 25	Doggy Fizzle Televizzle	MTV
November 28	Dinotopia	ABC
November 30	Barefoot Contessa	Food Network
December 1	Conquest	The History Channel
December 6	Codename: Kids Next Door	Cartoon Network
December 9	WinTuition	Game Show Network
December 11	Extreme Makeover	ABC
December 16	I Love the '80s	VH1
December 25	NBA on ABC	ABC

=== Shows changing networks ===
Show	Moved from	Moved to
The News with Brian Williams	MSNBC	CNBC
Stargate SG-1	Showtime	Sci-Fi Channel
The Wiggles	ABC Family	Playhouse Disney
Power Rangers Wild Force	Fox Kids	ABC Kids
NBA Inside Stuff	TNBC	ABC
The Wayne Brady Show	Syndication	ABC
Lingo	Syndication	Game Show Network
The Twilight Zone	Syndication	UPN
Wild Kingdom	NBC	Animal Planet
The Weakest Link	NBC	Syndication
Who Wants to Be a Millionaire	ABC	Syndication
Making the Band	ABC	MTV
Lloyd in Space	ABC	Toon Disney
Mary Kate and Ashley in Action!	ABC	Toon Disney
Teacher's Pet	ABC	Toon Disney
House of Mouse	ABC	Toon Disney
The Weekenders	ABC	Toon Disney
Teamo Supremo	ABC	Toon Disney
Mission Hill	The WB	Adult Swim
The Oblongs	The WB	Adult Swim
Baby Blues	The WB	Adult Swim
Beat The Clock	CTV	PAX TV

=== Returning this year ===
Show	Last aired	Previous network	New/same network	Returning
All That	2000	Nickelodeon	Same	January 19
Baby Blues	2000	The WB	Adult Swim	January 20
Mission Hill	2000	The WB	Adult Swim	July 14
The Oblongs	2001	The WB	Adult Swim	August 25
Barney & Friends	2000	PBS Kids	Same	September 2
The $100,000 Pyramid	1992	Syndication	Pyramid	September 16
Wild Kingdom	1988	NBC	Animal Planet	September 17

=== Ending this year ===
Date	Show	Network	Debut	Status
January 1	Tales from the Neverending Story	HBO	2001	Cancelled
January 5	Sk8	NBC	2001	Cancelled
January 11	The Ellen Show	CBS	2001	Cancelled
January 11	Card Sharks (returned in 2019)	Syndication	1978	Cancelled
January 15	Max Steel	Cartoon Network	2000	Cancelled
January 15	Imagine That	NBC	2002	Cancelled
January 18	The Outer Limits	Sci Fi Channel	1995	Cancelled
January 21	Daria	MTV	1997	Ended
January 25	The Chamber	Fox	2002	Cancelled
January 26	Marvin The Tap-Dancing Horse	PBS Kids	2000	Cancelled
January 26	That's Life	CBS	2000	Cancelled
January 27	Nikki	The WB	2000	Cancelled
January 31	The Tick	Fox	2001	Cancelled
February 1	Market Watch	CNBC	1998	Cancelled
February 5	Three Sisters	NBC	2001	Cancelled
February 10	Action League Now!	Nickelodeon	2001	Cancelled
February 13	Special Unit 2	UPN	2001	Cancelled
February 13	Dr. Katz Professional Therapist	Comedy Central	1995	Cancelled
February 14	Going to California	Showtime	2001	Cancelled
February 17	The Steve Harvey Show	The WB	1996	Cancelled
February 23	Sheena	Syndication	2002	Cancelled
March 4	Sponk!	Noggin	2001	Cancelled
March 5	100 Centre Street	A&E	2001	Cancelled
March 10	Any Day Now	Lifetime	1998	Cancelled
March 10	Baby Blues	Kids' WB	2000	Cancelled
March 12	Undeclared	Fox	2001	Cancelled
March 15	To Tell the Truth (returned in 2016)	Syndication	1956	Cancelled
March 16	The Nightmare Room	Kids' WB	2001	Cancelled
March 18	The Chair	ABC	2002	Cancelled
March 19	The Random Years	UPN	2002	Cancelled
March 21	My Guide to Becoming a Rock Star	The WB	2002	Cancelled
March 23	UC: Undercover	NBC	2001	Cancelled
March 25	Glory Days	The WB	2002	Cancelled
March 31	The URL With Phred Show	Noggin	2001	Cancelled
April 7	Sheep in the Big City	Cartoon Network	2000	Cancelled
April 9	The Court	Fox	2002	Cancelled
April 11	Eco-Challenge (returned in 2020)	Discovery Channel	1995	Cancelled
April 15	Once and Again	ABC	1999	Cancelled
April 17	Combat Missions	USA	2002	Cancelled
April 21	100 Deeds for Eddie McDowd	Nickelodeon	1999	Cancelled
April 24	The Job	ABC	2001	Cancelled
April 25	Leap of Faith	NBC	2002	Cancelled
April 26	Lexx	Sci Fi Channel	1997	Cancelled
April 28	Caitlin's Way	Nickelodeon	2000	Cancelled
April 30	Dharma & Greg	ABC	1997	Cancelled
April 30	Spin City	ABC	1996	Cancelled
May 1	Wolf Lake	UPN	2001	Cancelled
May 2	Late World with Zach	VH1	2002	Cancelled
May 3	Dark Angel	Fox	2000	Cancelled
May 3	First Monday	CBS	2002	Cancelled
May 3	Maybe It's Me	The WB	2001	Cancelled
May 4	So Little Time	ABC Family	2001	Cancelled
May 10	Raising Dad	The WB	2001	Cancelled
May 10	Teacher's Pet	Toon Disney	2000	Cancelled
May 11	Taina	Nickelodeon	2001	Cancelled
May 12	Ponderosa	PAX TV	2001	Cancelled
May 13	Beastmaster	Syndication	1999	Cancelled
May 13	The Lost World	Syndication	1999	Cancelled
May 14	Roswell	The WB	1999	Cancelled
May 14	Mysterious Ways	NBC	2000	Cancelled
May 17	Talk Soup (returned in 2004 as The Soup)	E!	1991	Ended
May 18	V.I.P.	Syndication	1998	Cancelled
May 18	The Andy Dick Show	MTV	2001	Cancelled
May 19	The X-Files (returned in 2016)	Fox	1993	Ended
May 19	WWF Jakked/Metal	Syndication	1999	Cancelled
May 20	Ally McBeal	Fox	1997	Cancelled
May 20	Earth: Final Conflict	Syndication	1997	Cancelled
May 20	Relic Hunter	Syndication	1999	Cancelled
May 20	The Hughleys	ABC	1998	Cancelled
May 22	Felicity	The WB	1998	Ended
May 22	The Rosie O'Donnell Show	Syndication	1996	Cancelled
May 22	Sally	Syndication	1983	Cancelled
May 24	Friday Night Videos	NBC	1983	Cancelled
May 24	Shop 'til You Drop (returned in 2003)	PAX TV	1991	Cancelled
May 25	Maximum Exposure	Syndication	2000	Cancelled
May 27	Family Law	CBS	1999	Cancelled
May 28	Philly	ABC	2001	Cancelled
May 29	That '80s Show	Fox	2002	Cancelled
June 2	The Education of Max Bickford	CBS	2001	Cancelled
June 6	Celebrity Deathmatch (returned in 2006)	MTV	1998	Cancelled
June 12	NBA on NBC (returned in 2025)	NBC	1990	Cancelled
June 15	The Tex Avery Show	Cartoon Network	1996	Cancelled
June 21	Smush	USA	2001	Cancelled
June 22	Alienators: Evolution Continues	Fox Kids	2001	Cancelled
June 25	Unscripted with Chris Connelly	ESPN	2001	Cancelled
June 29	Mary-Kate and Ashley in Action!	ABC	2001	Cancelled
June 29	Phantom Investigators	Kids' WB	2002	Cancelled
July 5	Politically Incorrect	ABC	1993	Cancelled
July 13	Spy Groove	MTV	2000	Cancelled
July 17	Breaking News	Bravo	2002	Cancelled
July 27	The New Woody Woodpecker Show	Fox Kids	1999	Cancelled
August 8	Pop-Up Video (returned in 2011)	VH1	1996	Cancelled
August 10	The Zeta Project	Kids' WB	2001	Cancelled
August 11	For Your Love	The WB	1998	Cancelled
August 11	Greg the Bunny	Fox	2002	Cancelled
August 11	Mission Hill	Adult Swim	1999	Cancelled
August 12	Titus	Fox	2000	Cancelled
August 18	A Nero Wolfe Mystery	A&E	2001	Cancelled
August 18	Totally in Tune	Disney Channel	2002	Cancelled
August 20	The Rerun Show	NBC	2002	Cancelled
August 24	Galidor: Defenders of the Outer Dimension	Fox Kids	2002	Cancelled
August 26	Witchblade	TNT	2001	Cancelled
August 30	I Bet You Will	MTV	2002	Cancelled
August 30	Dennis Miller Live	HBO	1994	Cancelled
August 31	Teen Summit	BET	1989	Cancelled
September 1	Contest Searchlight	Comedy Central	2002	Cancelled
September 5	Beyond Belief: Fact or Fiction	Fox	1997	Cancelled
September 5	Undressed	MTV	1999	Cancelled
September 7	Just Deal	NBC	2000	Cancelled
September 8	Arliss	HBO	1996	Cancelled
September 18	Resurrection Blvd.	Showtime	2000	Cancelled
September 20	Unsolved Mysteries (returned in 2008)	Lifetime	1987	Cancelled
September 21	The Amanda Show	Nickelodeon	1999	Cancelled
October 1	Son of the Beach	FX	2000	Cancelled
October 4	That Was Then	ABC	2002	Cancelled
October 5	Sagwa, the Chinese Siamese Cat (returned in 2004)	PBS Kids	2001	Cancelled
October 6	Nickelodeon Robot Wars	Nickelodeon	2002	Cancelled
October 7	Wild & Crazy Kids	Nickelodeon	1990	Cancelled
October 7	Beat the Geeks	Comedy Central	2001	Cancelled
October 14	The Oblongs	The WB	2001	Cancelled
October 15	Odyssey 5	Showtime	2002	Cancelled
October 18	Grim & Evil	Cartoon Network	2001	Cancelled
October 24	Push, Nevada	ABC	2002	Cancelled
October 27	Bram & Alice	CBS	2002	Cancelled
October 27	O2Be	Oxygen	2002	Cancelled
October 28	Girls Club	Fox	2002	Cancelled
October 31	Off Centre	The WB	2001	Cancelled
November 5	Haunted	UPN	2002	Cancelled
November 15	Pelswick	Nickelodeon	2000	Cancelled
November 22	In Search of... (returned in 2018)	Sci Fi Channel	1977	Cancelled
November 22	Courage the Cowardly Dog	Cartoon Network	1999	Cancelled
December 4	State of Grace	ABC Family	2001	Cancelled
December 10	Invader Zim (returned in 2006)	Nickelodeon	2001	Cancelled
December 11	MDs	ABC	2002	Cancelled
December 15	Do Over	The WB	2002	Cancelled
December 18	The Sylvester & Tweety Mysteries	Cartoon Network	1995	Cancelled
December 20	Providence	NBC	1999	Cancelled
December 20	Firefly	Fox	2002	Cancelled
December 20	I Love the '80s	VH1	2002	Cancelled
December 21	BattleBots (returned in 2015 and 2018)	Comedy Central	2000	Cancelled
December 26	Dinotopia	ABC	2002	Cancelled

=== Entering syndication this year ===
Show	Seasons	In Production	Source
Charmed	September 9, 2002 - August 27, 2006	Yes	
Dawson's Creek	September 16, 2002 - September 2, 2005	Yes	
Dharma & Greg	September 9, 2002 - May 28, 2006	Yes	
The Larry Sanders Show	August 26, 2002 - January 28, 2005	No	
Providence	September 16, 2002 - August 22, 2004	Yes	
Stargate SG-1	September 8, 2002 - April 15, 2007	Yes	
The Hughleys	September 9, 2002 - August 31, 2003	Yes	
That 70's Show	September 16, 2002 - June 29, 2014	Yes	
Will & Grace	September 23, 2002 - September 5, 2008	Yes	

=== Television films ===
Title	Network	Date of airing
Is It College Yet?	MTV	January 21
Cadet Kelly	Disney Channel	March 8
9/11	CBS	March 10
A Season on the Brink	ESPN	March 10
Blue's Clues: Joe's Scrapbook	Nickelodeon	April 29
Get a Clue	Disney Channel	June 28
Gotta Kick It Up!	Disney Channel	July 26
Hope Ranch	Animal Planet	September 2
Home Alone 4	ABC	November 3
Hey Arnold!: The Journal	Nickelodeon	November 11
Live from Baghdad	HBO	December 7
The Man Who Saved Christmas	CBS	December 15

=== Miniseries ===
Title	Channel	Premiere
Dinotopia	ABC	May 12
Taken	Sci-Fi	December 2

== Networks and services ==
=== Launches ===
Network	Type	Launch date	Notes	Source
TeleFutura	Over-the-air multicast/cable and satellite	January 14		
The Church Channel	Cable and satellite/over-the-air multicast	January 14		
YES Network	Cable and satellite	March 19		
G4	Cable television	April 24		
MTV Hits; MTV Jams; Nicktoons TV; VH1 MegaHits	Cable television	May 1		
National College Sports Network	Cable and satellite	June 1		
Discovery HD Theater	Cable and satellite	June 17		
BET Gospel; BET Hip-Hop	Cable television	July 1		
Fine Living Network	Cable and satellite	August 21		

=== Conversions and rebrandings ===
Old network name	New network name	Type	Conversion Date	Notes	Source
Discovery Science Channel	Science Channel	Cable and satellite	April 22	Discovery Science Channel becomes the first Discovery Networks-owned cable network to drop the Discovery branding from its name, rebranding as the Science Channel.	
HBO Plus	HBO 2	Cable and satellite	September		

=== Closures ===
Network	Type	End date	Notes	Sources
CNN/SI	Cable and satellite	May 15		
All News Channel	Satellite television	September 30		

== Television stations ==
=== Station launches ===
Date	City of license/market	Station	Channel	Affiliation	Notes/ref.
January 18	Pago Pago, American Samoa	K11UU	11	Baháʼí religious independent (primary); Australia Network (secondary)	
March	Juneau, Alaska	K24FM	24	Pax TV	
April	Goldfield/Reno, Nevada	KTVY-TV	7	ImaginAsian	
April	Sheridan, Wyoming	KJCW	7	CBS	Satellite of KTVQ
June 9	Richmond, Virginia	W39CD	39	TBN	
June 13	Lewiston, Idaho	K61HN	61	America One	
June 13	Redding, California	K50LD	50	Daystar	
September	Columbus/Tupelo, Mississippi	WCBI-DT2	4.2	UPN	
September 2	Palm Springs, California	KPSP-LP	38	CBS	
October 6	Tazewell/Knoxville, Tennessee	WVLR	48	CTN	
October 17	Hagåtña, Guam (Agana)	K28HS	28	TBN	
October 17	Hagåtña, Guam (Agana)	K30HB	30	TBN	
October 17	Hagåtña, Guam (Agana)	K32GB	32	TBN	
October 17	Hagåtña, Guam (Agana)	K36GJ	36	TBN	
November 27	Chisholm, Minnesota	KRII	11	NBC	Semi-satellite of KBJR/Duluth
December 1	Waterloo/Cedar Rapids, Iowa	KWWF	22	LeSEA/World Harvest Television	
Unknown date	Christiansted, U.S. Virgin Islands	W52DG	52	Religious independent	
Unknown date	Farmington, New Mexico	KOFT	8	ABC	Satellite of KOAT-TV/Albuquerque, New Mexico
Unknown date	Huntsville, Alabama	WZDX-DT2	54.2	The WB	
Unknown date	Missoula, Montana	KMMF	17	Fox	
Unknown date	Pago Pago, American Samoa	K30HO	30	TBN	
Unknown date	Parkersburg, West Virginia (Marietta, Ohio)	W64CS	64	unknown	
Unknown date	Parkersburg, West Virginia (Marietta, Ohio)	W22CU	22	unknown	
Unknown date	Pascagoula/Biloxi, Mississippi	W07DG	7	America One	
Unknown date	Syracuse, New York	WNYI	52	Univision	
Unknown date	Woodward, Oklahoma	KUOK	36	Pax TV	

=== Network affiliation changes ===
Date	City of License/Market	Station	Channel	Old affiliation	New affiliation	Notes/ref.
March	Berrien Springs, Michigan (South Bend/Elkhart, Indiana)	WRDY-LP	25	Independent	ABC (via WBND-LP)	
July 15	Gainesville, Florida	WGFL	23	The WB (primary); UPN (secondary)	CBS (primary); UPN (secondary)	
July 15	Gainesville, Florida	WBFL-LP	11	The WB (primary); UPN (secondary)	CBS (primary); UPN (secondary)	
July 15	Jacksonville, Florida	WJXT	4	CBS	Independent	
July 15	Jacksonville, Florida	WTEV-TV	47	UPN	CBS	
September 2	Portland, Oregon	KPTV	12	UPN	Fox	
September 2	Portland, Oregon	KPDX	49	Fox	UPN	
September 8	Minneapolis–Saint Paul	KMSP	9	UPN	Fox	
September 8	Minneapolis–Saint Paul	WFTC	29	Fox	UPN	
October	Berrien Springs, Michigan (South Bend/Elkhart, Indiana)	WRDY-LP	25	ABC (via WBND-LP)	The WB	
November 1	Sheridan, Wyoming	KJCW	7	CBS	NBC	
Unknown date	Bellingham, Washington (Vancouver, British Columbia, Canada)	KVOS-TV	12	Independent (primary); CityTV (secondary)	Independent (full-time)	
Unknown date	Calipatria/El Centro, California; Yuma, Arizona, United States/Mexicali, Baja California, Mexico	KAJB	54	Independent	Telefutura	
Unknown date	Lima, Ohio	WLMO-LP	38	Fox (as W65DP)	CBS	
Unknown date	Madison, Wisconsin	WISC-DT2	3.2 (digital)	The WB	UPN	
Unknown date	Madison, Wisconsin	WBUW	57	UPN (as WHPN)	The WB	

== Births ==
Date	Name	Notability
January 22	Caitlin Clark	Basketball player
February 2	Soni Nicole Bringas	Actress (Fuller House)
February 4	Graham Verchere	Actor (My Little Pony: Friendship Is Magic, The Good Doctor)
February 5	Davis Cleveland	Actor (Shake It Up)
February 6	Shelby Simmons	Actress (Bunk'd)
February 11	Chase Vacnin	Actor (Drama Club)
February 24	Louis Tomeo	Actor (Every Witch Way)
March 4	Jacob Hopkins	Voice actor (Gumball on The Amazing World of Gumball (2014–17))
March 29	Mohana Krishnan	Actress (I Am Frankie)
April 8	Skai Jackson	Actress (Bubble Guppies, Jessie, Dora the Explorer, Bunk'd)
April 18	Noah Thompson	Singer on (American Idol)
April 26	Kristen Li	Voice actress (Bubbles on The Powerpuff Girls)
May 6	Emily Alyn Lind	Actress (Revenge, Gossip Girl)
May 6	Angel Reese	Basketball player
May 8	Ethan Wacker	Actor (Miles from Tomorrowland, Bizaardvark)
May 9	Cree Cicchino	Actress (Game Shakers)
May 16	Sadie Sink	Actress (Stranger Things)
May 19	Kayden Muller-Janssen	Actress (The Villains of Valley View)
May 29	Aidan Miner	Actor (School of Rock)
May 31	Giselle Torres	Actress
June 2	Madison Hu	Actress (Bizaardvark)
June 4	Eva Bella	Actress (Shimmer and Shine)
June 16	Isaak Presley	Actor (Stuck in the Middle)
June 16	Matthew Zhang	Actor (Henry Danger, Harvey Beaks)
June 17	Jake Goodman	Canadian actor (Life with Boys, Max & Shred)
June 25	Mason Vale Cotton	Actor (Desperate Housewives, Mad Men)
July 23	Benjamin Flores Jr.	Actor (The Haunted Hathaways, Game Shakers)
July 26	Michael Campion	Actor (Fuller House)
July 26	Theodore Barnes	Actor (Legendary Dudas, Nicky, Ricky, Dicky & Dawn)
July 31	Lela Brown	Actress (Just Roll with It) and Rapper
July 31	Abi Carter	Singer (American Idol)
August 18	Murray Wyatt Rundus	Actor (Gamer's Guide to Pretty Much Everything)
August 19	Brighton Sharbino	Actress (The Walking Dead)
August 21	Isabella Pappas	Actress (The Villains of Valley View)
August 30	Grant Palmer	Voice actor (Lincoln Loud on The Loud House (Episodes 1–22))
September 3	Iman Vellani	Actress (Ms. Marvel)
September 6	Asher Angel	Actor (Andi Mack)
September 6	Pearce Joza	Actor (Legendary Dudas, Mech-X4)
September 8	Gaten Matarazzo	Actor (Stranger Things)
September 12	DeVion Harris	Actor (Legendary Dudas)
September 19	Isaac Kragten	Actor (Odd Squad)
September 21	Ethan Estrada	Actor (Talia in the Kitchen)
September 22	Cody Veith	Actor (Walk the Prank)
September 27	Jenna Ortega	Actress (Jane the Virgin, Stuck in the Middle, Elena of Avalor)
September 27	Jillian Shea Spaeder	Actress (Walk the Prank)
September 30	Maddie Ziegler	Actress (Dance Moms)
October 3	Felix Avitia	Actor (Gamer's Guide to Pretty Much Everything, Raven's Home)
October 6	Rio Mangini	Actor (Bella and the Bulldogs, Everything Sucks!)
October 12	Iris Apatow	Actress (Love)
October 14	Thomas Kuc	Actor (Game Shakers)
October 25	Johnny Sequoyah	Actress
November 15	Van Crosby	Actor (Splitting Up Together)
November 20	Madisyn Shipman	Actress (Saturday Night Live, Game Shakers)
November 26	Baylee Littrell	Actor
November 30	Emily Skinner	Actress (Andi Mack)
December 6	Cade Sutton	Actor (Kirby Buckets)
December 20	Isabella Ferreira	Actress (Love, Victor)
December 23	Finn Wolfhard	Actor (Stranger Things, Carmen Sandiego)

== Deaths ==
Date	Name	Age	Notability
January 13	Ted Demme	38	Director
February 6	Guy Stockwell	68	Actor, brother of Dean Stockwell
February 13	Waylon Jennings	64	Singer (balladeer/narrator on The Dukes of Hazzard)
February 15	Howard K. Smith	87	Television anchor (ABC News, CBS News)
February 22	Chuck Jones	89	Animator (Looney Tunes), director (How the Grinch Stole Christmas!)
February 24	Mel Stewart	72	Character actor (Henry Jefferson on All in the Family and Billy Melrose on Scarecrow and Mrs. King)
February 28	Mary Stuart	75	Soap opera actress (Jo for the entire 35-year run of Search for Tomorrow)
March 15	Sylvester Weaver	93	President of NBC, credited with creating (The Today Show and The Tonight Show)
March 17	Rosetta LeNoire	90	Actress (Mother Winslow on Family Matters)
March 27	Milton Berle	93	Comedian, actor (Texaco Star Theater)
April 2	Jack Kruschen	80	Character actor (Papa Papadopolous on Webster)
April 16	Robert Urich	55	Actor (Spenser on Spenser: For Hire and Dan Tanna on Vega$)
April 25	Lisa Lopes	30	Rapper of TLC
May 24	Susie Garrett	72	Actress (Betty Johnson on Punky Brewster), sister of Marla Gibbs
June 3	Sam Whipple	41	Actor (Open All Night, Seven Days)
June 5	Dee Dee Ramone	50	Singer-songwriter (Ramones)
June 13	John Hope	83	Meteorologist of The Weather Channel
June 18	Nancy Addison	56	Soap opera actress (Kit Vested on Guiding Light, Jillian Coleridge on Ryan's Hope, Marissa Rampal on All My Children, Deborah Brewster Alden on both Loving and The City)
July 8	Ward Kimball	88	Animator
August 5	Josh Ryan Evans	20	Actor (Timmy Lenox on Passions)
September 7	Erma Franklin	64	Singer
September 14	LaWanda Page	81	Comedian, actress (Aunt Esther on Sanford and Son)
September 28	Whitney Blake	76	Actress (Dorothy Baxter on Hazel), co-creator of One Day at a Time and mother of Meredith Baxter
October 10	Teresa Graves	54	Actress (Get Christie Love!)
October 13	Keene Curtis	79	Actor (John Allen Hill on Cheers)
October 20	Barbara Berjer	82	Actress (Claire Cassen Shea on As the World Turns, Barbara Norris Thorpe on Guiding Light, Bridget Connell on Another World)
November 3	Jonathan Harris	87	Actor (Bradford Webster on The Third Man, Doctor Zachary Smith on Lost in Space, Commander Isaac Gampu on Space Academy)
November 9	Merlin Santana	26	Actor (Romeo Santana on The Steve Harvey Show)
December 3	Glenn Quinn	32	Actor (Mark on Roseanne)
December 5	Roone Arledge	71	Sports producer, credited with creating (Monday Night Football)

== See also ==
- 2002 in the United States
- List of American films of 2002
