= KSWY =

KSWY may refer to:

- KSWY-LP, a defunct low-power television station (channel 29) formerly licensed to Sheridan, Wyoming, United States
- KJCW (TV), a television station (channel 7) licensed to Sheridan, Wyoming, which used the call sign KSWY from 2002 to 2010
