= Tomoko =

- Pronunciation: (TOH-moh-koh)
- Gender: Female

Origin
- Origin: Japanese
- Meaning: Different meanings depending on the kanji used
- Region of origin: Japan

Tomoko (ともこ, トモコ) is a common, traditional female Japanese given name. Like many Japanese names, Tomoko can be written using different kanji characters and can mean:

- 友子 - "friendly child"
- 知子 - "knowing child"
- 智子 - "wise child"
- 朋子 - "friendly child"

== People with the name ==
- Tomoko Abe (阿部 知子; born 1948), Japanese politician
- Tomoko Akane (赤根 智子), Japanese judge
- Tomoko Akiya (秋谷 智子; born 1976), Japanese voice actress
- Tomoko Fukumi (福見 友子; born 1985), Japanese judoka
- Tomoko Fuse (布施 知子; born 1951), Japanese origami writer
- Tomoko Hagiwara (萩原 智子; born 1980), Japanese swimmer
- Tomoko Honda (本田 朋子; born 1983), Japanese announcer
- Tomoko Hoshino (星野 知子; born 1957), Japanese actress and essayist
- Tomoko Igata (井形 とも子; born 1965), Japanese motorcycle racer
- Tomoko Ikuta (生田 智子; born 1967), Japanese actress
- Tomoko Ishida (石田 智子; born 1977), Japanese sprinter
- Tomoko Ishimura (石村 知子; born 1972), Japanese voice actress
- Tomoko Kami (紙 智子; born 1955), Japanese politician
- Tomoko Kamimura (上村 智子; 1956 – 1977), victim of Minamata disease and subject of the photo Tomoko and Mother in the Bath
- Tomoko Kanazawa (金澤 朋子; born 1995), Japanese singer
- Tomoko Kaneda (金田 朋子; born 1973), Japanese voice actress
- Tomoko Kashiki (樫木 知子; born 1982), Japanese artist
- Tomoko Kawakami (川上 とも子; 1970 – 2011), Japanese voice actress
- Tomoko Kawase (川瀬 智子; born 1975), Japanese singer
- Tomoko Kitamura (北村 智子; born 1963), Japanese professional wrestler
- Tomoko Kondō (近藤 智子; born 1968), Japanese singer, part of 1980s J-Pop duo BaBe
- Tomoko Konoike (鴻池 朋子; born 1960), Japanese painter
- Tomoko Maruo (丸尾 知子), Japanese voice actress
- Tomoko Masuzawa, American philosopher
- Tomoko Matsunaga (松永 知子; born 1971), Japanese women's footballer
- Tomoko Matsunashi (松梨 智子; born 1971), Japanese film director and actress
- Tomoko Miho (1931 – 2012), American graphic designer
- Tomoko Miyaguchi (宮口 知子; born 1975), Japanese professional wrestler
- Tomoko Moriguchi-Matsuno (born 1945), American businesswoman
- Tomoko Muramatsu (村松 智子; born 1994), Japanese women's footballer
- Tomoko Nagai (永井 奉子; born 1981), Japanese swimmer
- Tomoko Naka (中 友子; born 1963), Japanese voice actress
- Tomoko Nakajima (中嶋 朋子; born 1971), Japanese actress
- Tomoko Namba (南場 智子; born 1962), Japanese businesswoman
- Tomoko Naraoka (奈良岡 朋子; 1929–2023), Japanese actress
- Tomoko Ninomiya (二ノ宮 知子; born 1969), Japanese manga artist
- Tomoko Ogawa (尾川 智子; born 1978), Japanese rock climber
- Tomoko Ohta (太田 朋子; born 1933), Japanese geneticist, pioneer of the nearly neutral theory of molecular evolution
- Tomoko Oka (岡 智子; born 1964), Japanese fencer
- Tomoko Okano (岡野 知子; born 1979), Japanese volleyball player
- Tomoko Onogi (大野木 智子; born 1969), Japanese swimmer
- Tomoko Owada (大和田 智子; born 1941), Japanese fencer
- Tomoko Sakagami (坂上 智子; born 1983), Japanese ice hockey player
- Tomoko Sasaki (佐々木 知子; born 1955), Japanese lawyer, politician and writer
- Tomoko Sawada (澤田 知子; born 1977), Japanese photographer
- Tomoko Sugawara, Japanese harpist
- Tomoko Suzuki (鈴木 智子; born 1982), Japanese women's footballer
- Tomoko Tabata (田畑 智子; born 1980), Japanese actress
- Tomoko Takahashi (born 1966), Japanese artist
- Tomoko Tamura (田村智子; born 1965), Japanese politician
- Tomoko Tamura (fl. 1983), Japanese table tennis player
- Tomoko Tanaka (田中 智子; born 1958), Japanese ice dancer
- Tomoko Tane (種 ともこ; born 1961), Japanese singer, songwriter and arranger
- Tomoko Taniguchi (たにぐち 智子), Japanese manga artist
- Tomoko Ukishima (浮島 智子; born 1963), Japanese politician
- Tomoko Yamaguchi (山口 智子; born 1964), Japanese actress and singer
- Tomoko Yonemura (米村 知子; born 1982), Japanese tennis player
- Tomoko Yoshida (吉田 知子; born 1934), Japanese writer
- Tomoko Yoshihara (吉原 知子; born 1970), Japanese volleyball player
- Tomoko Yoshino (芳野友子; born 1965), Japanese president of RENGO

== Fictional characters ==
- Tomoko Anabuki (穴拭 智子), a character from the light novel series Strike Witches
- Tomoko Hayashi, a character from the tokusatsu show Himitsu Sentai Gorenger
- Tomoko Higashikata, a character from the manga series JoJo's Bizarre Adventure
- Tomoko Kuroki, the main character from the manga series WataMote
- Tomoko Midorikawa (緑川 とも子), a character from the 2012 anime series Smile PreCure!
- Tomoko Nakaoka, the baby sister of Barefoot Gen
- Tomoko Nomura (野村 朋子), a character from the manga and anime series Great Teacher Onizuka
- Tomoko Nozama, a character from the tokusatsu show Kamen Rider Fourze
- Tomoko Saeki, a character from the anime and manga series DNA²
- Tomoko Shiretoko, a character from the Boku no Hero Academia
- In Liu Cixin's science fiction novel Death's End the ambassador of an alien civilisation is called 智子 and appears in the shape of a Japanese woman. This is a double entendre between sophon (a fictitious elementary particle) and the Japanese name.

== See also ==
- "Tomoko", a song by Icelandic singer Hafdís Huld
- Tomoyo
