= List of Mitsubishi A6M Zero operators =

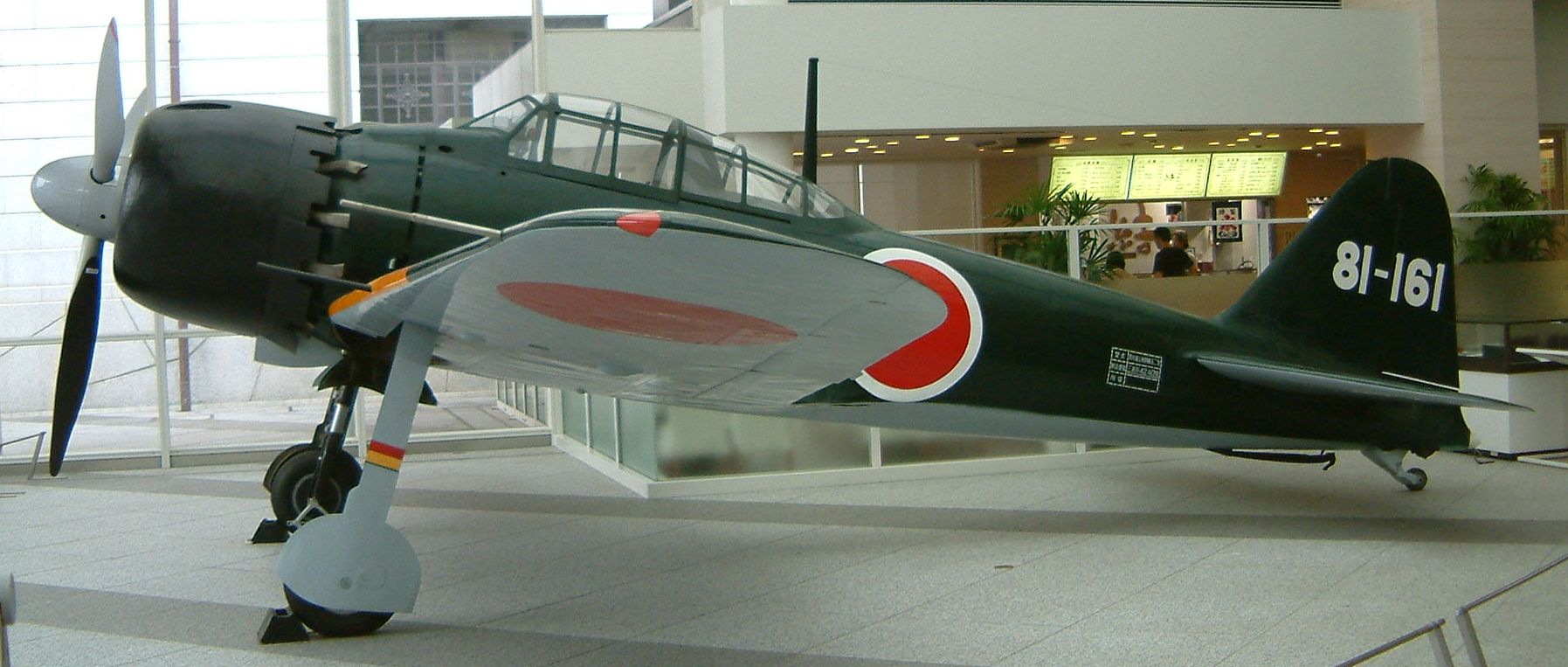
Mitsubishi A6M Zero Model 52 (A6M5)

The Mitsubishi A6M Zero was the most well-known Japanese warplane of World War II. A6M Zeros were predominantly used by the Imperial Japanese Navy (IJN) on aircraft carriers, and also by its land-based fighter units. At the start of the Pacific War in 1941, the A6M constituted about 60% of the IJN fighter force. It took part in carrier operations throughout much of the Pacific Ocean, as well as over the northeast Indian Ocean.

== China ==
Both the Nationalists and Communists operated a number of captured A6M's (A6M2, A6M3, A6M5s, etc.) in the Chinese Civil War. The planes captured by the Nationalists had originally been flown as part of Japan's 12th, 13th, 14th, and 15th Naval Units as well as Shanghai Kōkūtai on the mainland, and as part of Japan's Formosan Navy units: Hao Toko, Takao, Tetshu, Kagi, Toki, and Tainan Kōkūtai.

== France ==
The Armée de l'Air (French Air Force) used the Mitsubishi A6M2 Model 21 "Zeke" and Nakajima A6M2-N "Rufes" against rebels in Indochina during 1945–1946, according to Harvey Low in "Japanese Aircraft in foreign service (WWII and Post WWII)" research. The Aéronautique Naval also pressed a single Nakajima A6M2-N into service, but the aircraft crashed shortly after being overhauled.

== Indonesia ==
In 1945, Indonesian pro-independence guerrillas captured a small number of A6M aircraft at numerous Japanese air bases, including Bugis Air Base in Malang (repatriated 18 September 1945). Most aircraft were destroyed in military conflicts between the newly proclaimed Republic of Indonesia and the Netherlands, during the Indonesian National Revolution of 1945–1949. Small numbers of surviving aircraft were saved in Kalijati Air Base, near Subang, West Java and Museum Dirgantara Udara, Yogyakarta (near Adi Sucipto Airport).

== Empire of Japan ==
=== Aircraft carriers ===
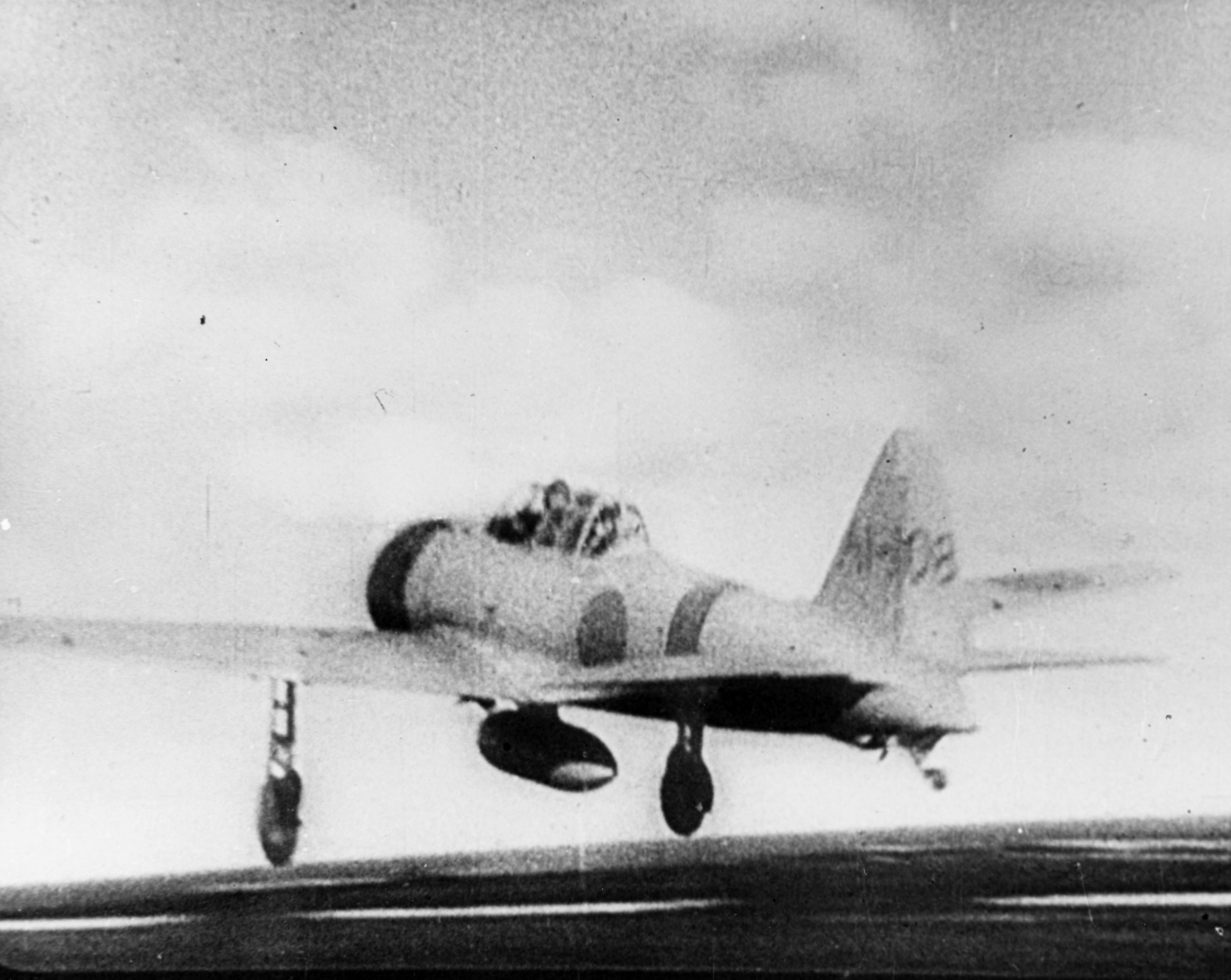
Mitsubishi A6M2 "Zero" Model 21 takes off from the aircraft carrier Akagi to attack Pearl Harbor.

- Akagi – Flagship of Admiral Nagumo equipped with A6M2 used in the attack on Pearl Harbor. This carrier operated from Rabaul (New Guinea) and Midway, where it was sunk by US Navy bombers.
- Hiryū – Participant in the attacks on Pearl Harbor, Wake Island, Port Darwin, Indian Ocean, and in the Battle of Midway; armed with A6M2 Reisen fighters.
- Hiyō – Operated in the Solomon Islands, Rabaul, Admiralty Islands (New Guinea), and Truk; armed with A6M2 and A6M3 Reisen fighters.
- Jun'yō – Participant in diverse operations in the Aleutians, Battle of Santa Cruz, and Solomon Islands; armed with A6M2 and A6M3 Reisen fighters.
- Kaga – The A6M1 Reisen was first evaluated aboard this carrier. It participated in the attacks on Pearl Harbor, Rabaul, Indian Ocean, and Midway, where it was sunk. It was equipped with A6M2 Reisen fighters.
- Ryūhō – Light aircraft carrier equipped with A6M Reisen fighters. Participant of the First Battle of the Philippine Sea.
- Ryūjō – Flagship of Admiral Hosoyaga used in the Aleutian Islands and Solomon Islands, where she was sunk. Her main fighters were the A6M2 Reisen.
- Shōhō – Transported about 30 A6M Reisen fighters to Rabaul, and took part in battles at Tulagi, New Britain, the Solomon Islands, and the Battle of Coral Sea with the A6M2 Reisen as her main fighter.
- Shōkaku – One of the most active of Japanese carriers, she participated in the attacks on Pearl Harbor, Rabaul, Port Darwin, the Admiralty Islands, New Guinea, the Philippines, as well as the invasion of Port Moresby, the Battle of Coral Sea, and the Battle of Santa Cruz. She was equipped with a variety of planes including the A6M2, A6M3, and A6M5 Reisen fighters.
- Sōryū – Another old combatant in battles at Pearl Harbor, Wake Island, Indian Ocean, and Midway, where she was sunk along with her wing of A6M2 Reisen fighters.
- Zuihō – Escort carrier that participated in the Battle of Midway, Battle of Santa Cruz, and Rabaul Base, and later sunk 25 October 1944 during the Battle off Cape Engaño. She was equipped with A6M2 and A6M3 Reisen fighters.

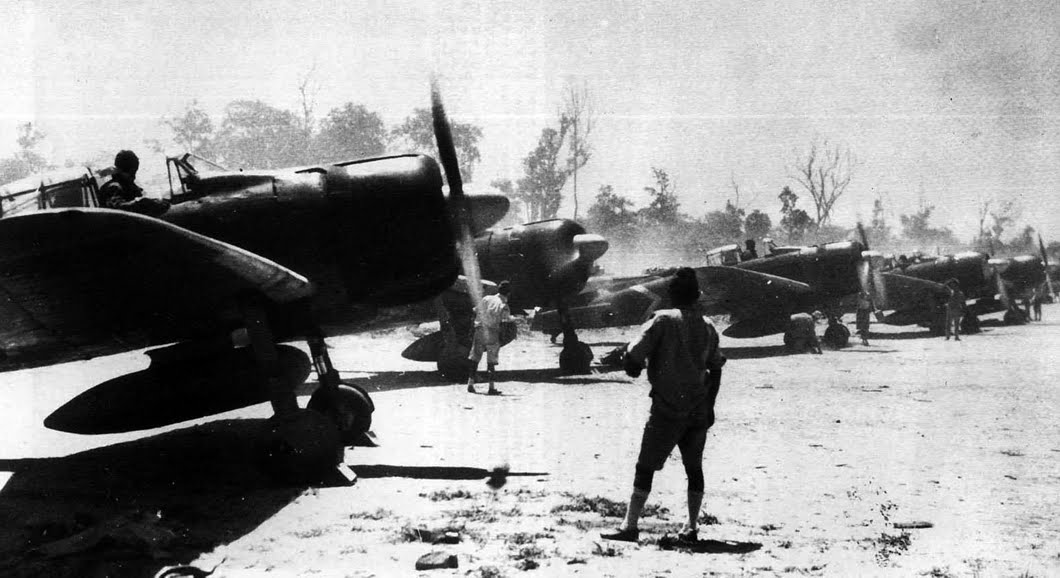
Carrier A6M2 and A6M3 Zeros from the aircraft carrier Zuikaku preparing for a mission at Rabaul

- Zuikaku – A veteran of the Pearl Harbor Attack, she took part in attacks on Rabaul, Indian Ocean, New Guinea, the Santa Cruz Islands, and the invasion of Port Moresby and the Battle of Coral Sea. She was armed with A6M2 and A6M3 Reisen fighters.
- Chūyō – Escort Carrier armed with A6M2 and A6M3 Reisen fighters.
- Hōshō – Escort Flattop armed with A6M2, A6M3, and A6M5 Reisen fighters.
- Un'yō – Escort Carrier armed with A6M2 and A6M5 Reisen fighters.
- Chitose – Escort Flattop armed with A6M2 and A6M5 Reisen fighters.
- Amagi – Large carrier projected for use with A6M5c and A6M6c Reisen fighters.
- Katsuragi – Large carrier projected for use of A6M5c and A6M6c Reisen fighters.
- Taiyō – Escort Flattop equipped first with the A5M4, later replaced with A6M2 and A6M3. She participated in the South Seas Mandate, and operated in New Guinea, Singapore, the Indian Ocean, and the Philippines.
- Shin'yō – Escort Flattop equipped with A6M3 and A6M5 Reisen fighters that operated in the Philippines and Singapore.
- Chiyoda – Medium class carrier, equipped with A6M3 and A6M5 Reisen fighters. She participated in the South Seas Mandate, and operated in Guam, the Dutch Indies, and the Philippines.
- Taihō – Large Carrier equipped with A6M3 and A6M5 Reisen fighters that participated in defence of the Mariana Islands.
- Shinano – Giant Carrier that was intended to consist of 18 Mitsubishi A7M Reppū (Allied reporting name: "Sam") fighters.
- Unryū – Fleet Carrier equipped with A6M5 Reisen fighters. She was sent to the Philippines with a load of 30 Ohka suicide rockets of the Thunder-Gods Corps for transport to Manila.
- Kasagi
- Aso – An Unryu-class aircraft carrier built with destroyer engines. She was incomplete at the end of the war.
- Ikoma – ja:生駒 (空母)

=== By airbase name ===
- Chitose – Unit that operated from Chitose, in the metropolitan areas of Wake Island, Kwajalein (South Seas Mandate), and the Solomon Islands, with A6M2, A6M3, and A6M5 Reisen fighters. Later merged with 653rd Air Corps.
- Genzan (Genzan Air Group) – Famous unit known as "the Protector of Chosen", for its principal airbase; they operated from Genzan, Saigon (French Indochina), Malacca, Rabaul, and the Admiralty Islands, using A6M2 and A6M3 along with G4M Bombers. On return to the main base, they acted as operational trainers with A6M5b and A6M5-K aircraft, and served as interceptors with J2M3, N1K2, and A6M5c against the Soviets and Americans.
- Kanoya – Mixed group which operated with Reisen and G4M "Betty", from Kanoya, Kagoshima, Andaman, Kyūshū, and Malaysia. They returned to the metropolitan area equipped with A6M5c.
- Konoike – Operative trainer unit equipped with A6M2, A6M3, and A6M5a; later entered into kamikaze operations with A6M2 and A6M5.
- Ōita – Operative trainer unit that formed part of the second striking front line, with bases in Ōita and Kyūshū; equipped with A6M5.
- Ominato – Mixed unit with A6M3 and A6M5, along B5N2 "Kate" and E13A1 "Jake", with bases in Ominato, Aomori, and Honshū.
- Ohmura – Initially a combat unit, it was later converted to an Operative trainer unit which included instructor Saburō Sakai. Its bases were Ohmura (Sasebo), Nagasaki, Hiroshima, and Kyūshū. Later converted to an interceptor unit with A6M5c.
- Saeki – Unit began equipped with E13A1 "Jake", later equipped with A6M5 and A6M5c.
- Tainan – The most famous air corps of the Japanese Navy Air Force, with many principal air aces. Operated in Tainan, Rabaul (where they acquired their fame and triumphs), the Philippines, Taihoku, the Dutch Indies, Lae, New Guinea, the Admiralty Islands, and finally as interceptors over mainland Japan against USAAF. Equipped with A6M2, A6M3, A6M5, and A6M5c.
- Takao – Mixed unit equipped C5M2 "Babs", G3M bomber, and A6M2; later returned to base in Takao with A6M3 and A6M5, to convert to interceptors with A6M5c.
- Toko – Mixed unit with H6K4 "Mavis", E13A1 "Jake", and A6M2; later converted to interceptor with A6M5c.
- Tokushima – Operative trainer unit with bases in Tokushima, Shikoku, and Okinawa, equipped with A6M2, A6M2-K, and A6M5.
- Tsukuba – Operative trainer unit with bases in Tsukuba, Ibaraki, and Honshū with A6M2 and A6M2-K. In 1945, the group was equipped with A6M5c as part of metropolitan defence.
- Yabate – Operative trainer unit with bases in Yabate, Honshū, and metropolitan area; later, was in process of converting to interceptors with A6M6c.
- Yokosuka – Naval Air Technical Institute, Flight Test Department, and Naval administrative service; this unit was known for its principal base. They operated also from Kanagawa and Honshū; Hiroyoshi Nishizawa acted as an instructor in the detachment from December 1942 to January 1943. The unit was converted to interceptors equipped with A6M5c, A6M6c, J2M5, and N1K2-Ja in 1944–45.
- Mihoro – Mixed unit equipped with G3M and G4M bombers along with A6M2. They operated from Mihoro, Okinawa, Hainan, and French Indochina, and participated in seeking and sinking of British vessels HMS Prince of Wales and HMS Repulse.
- Iwakuni – Combat unit which participated in metropolitan defence; equipped with A6M5c.
- Naruo – Combat unit which acted in defence of Japan with A6M5c.
- Kokubu – Interceptor unit equipped with A6M5c.
- Kagoshima – Combat unit equipped with A6M5c.

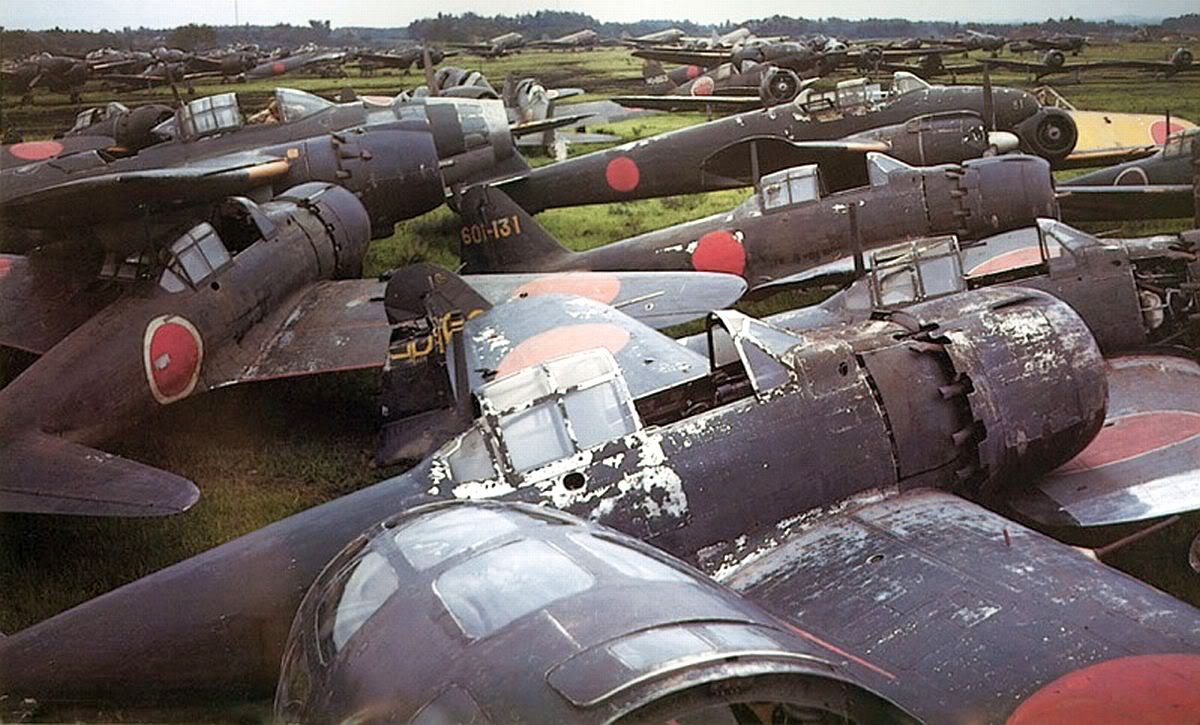
Mitsubishi A6M5 Model 52s abandoned by the Japanese at Atsugi naval air base and captured by US forces

- Atsugi – One of the most important bases, its unit participated in actions overseas, returning as interceptors with A6M5c and A6M6c.
- Kanoya – Another mixed unit equipped with G3M bombers, G4M bombers, and A6M2 fighters. They participated in kamikaze operations with G4M bombers equipped with Ohka glider bombs, and as interceptors equipped with A6M5c.
- Usa – Fighter air unit equipped with A6M based in Usa, Ōita. This unit provided some fighters that participated in the Pearl Harbor Attack.
- Kasumigaura – Operative trainer unit equipped with A6M3 and A6M5. Later converted to interceptors with A6M5c.
- Yokohama – Combat unit equipped with A6M2, along A6M2-N "Rufe" hydro fighters; later operated with A6M5c as interceptors in mainland Japan.
- Aomori – A combat unit which returned to Japanese skies as interceptors with A6M5c and A6M6c.
- Hyakuri – Operative trainer unit, later converted to interceptors with A6M5c.
- Tsuikui – Operative trainer unit, later in process of conversion to interceptor with A6M6c.
- Otsu – Combat unit with A6M2, A6M2-N "Rufe", and N1K1 "Rex" hydrofighters; later returned as interceptors with hydrofighters and A6M5c from the Biwa Lake area.
- Kisarazu – Combat unit from Kisarazu, equipped with A6M and G4M.
- Misawa – Combat unit from Misawa, equipped with A6M and G4M.
- Chichijima – Air group based in Chichijima, equipped with twin-engine bombers and Reisens.
- Sasebo – Served as Navy arsenal and other Air units, equipped with land-based torpedo bombers and fighters.
- Himeji – Air group organized in Himeji, equipped with bombers and A6M fighters.
- Amakusa – Unit created from Amakusa, with trainer group and fighter operative units.
- Fukuyama – Combat group equipped with hydroplanes, bombers, and fighters.
- Tateyama – Unit with base in Tateyama, equipped with twin-engine bombers and fighters.
- Takuma – Combat group with base in Takuma, equipped with twin-engine bombers and fighters.
- Kisarazu – Unit with base in Kisarazu, equipped with land-based torpedo-bombers and fighters.
- Matsushima – Group with base in Matsushima, equipped with twin-engine bombers and fighters.
- Kashima – Operative training group with base in Kashima, later converted to a combat unit.
- Shanghai – Air group based in Shanghai (Japanese-occupied Chinese land), equipped with twin-engine bombers and fighters. Also possessed an operational training unit. The unit participated in kamikaze actions.
- Suzuka – Operative training unit, later converted to a combat group.
- Shumushu – Special detachment based in Kataoka, Shumushu and Kashibawara, and Paramushiro (Kuriles) as part of 203 Air Group and North Sea Fleet; equipped with A6M5s and J1N1-S Gekkos. They fought against Americans and Russians air incursions over the islands.
- Hokuto – Operative unit equipped with B5N Kate, B6N "Jill", and A6M based in Kataoka, Shumushu (Kurils), later merged into 553rd Air Corps.
- Tsuchiura – Air group based in Tsuchiura, equipped with A6M and hydroplanes; later served as an interceptor squadron over Japan.
- Nan-Yo – Air unit formed for the South Seas Mandate, equipped with transports, bombers, hydroplanes, and A6M fighters. Unit fought against the US Navy in the same area and in the Philippines.
- Southern Philippines Air Group – Air group based in Davao, Philippines, and equipped with Nakajima L2D "Tabby" transports and fighters.
- Okinawa – Air group based in Yontan and Kadena airfields, Okinawa, and equipped with fighters and torpedo bombers. Acted during Okinawa campaign against US forces.
- Oppama (Yokosuka) – Unit based in Oppama, originally equipped with Torpedo bombers, and later converted to a defensive squadron with A6M fighters.
- Tinian – Squadron based in Tinian, Marianas, and Lae, equipped with A6M fighters.
- Other minor air corps were provided from bases of Tetshu, Kagi, and Toki in Formosa (Taiwan). The units also used A6M fighters and light and medium bombers.

=== By unit number ===
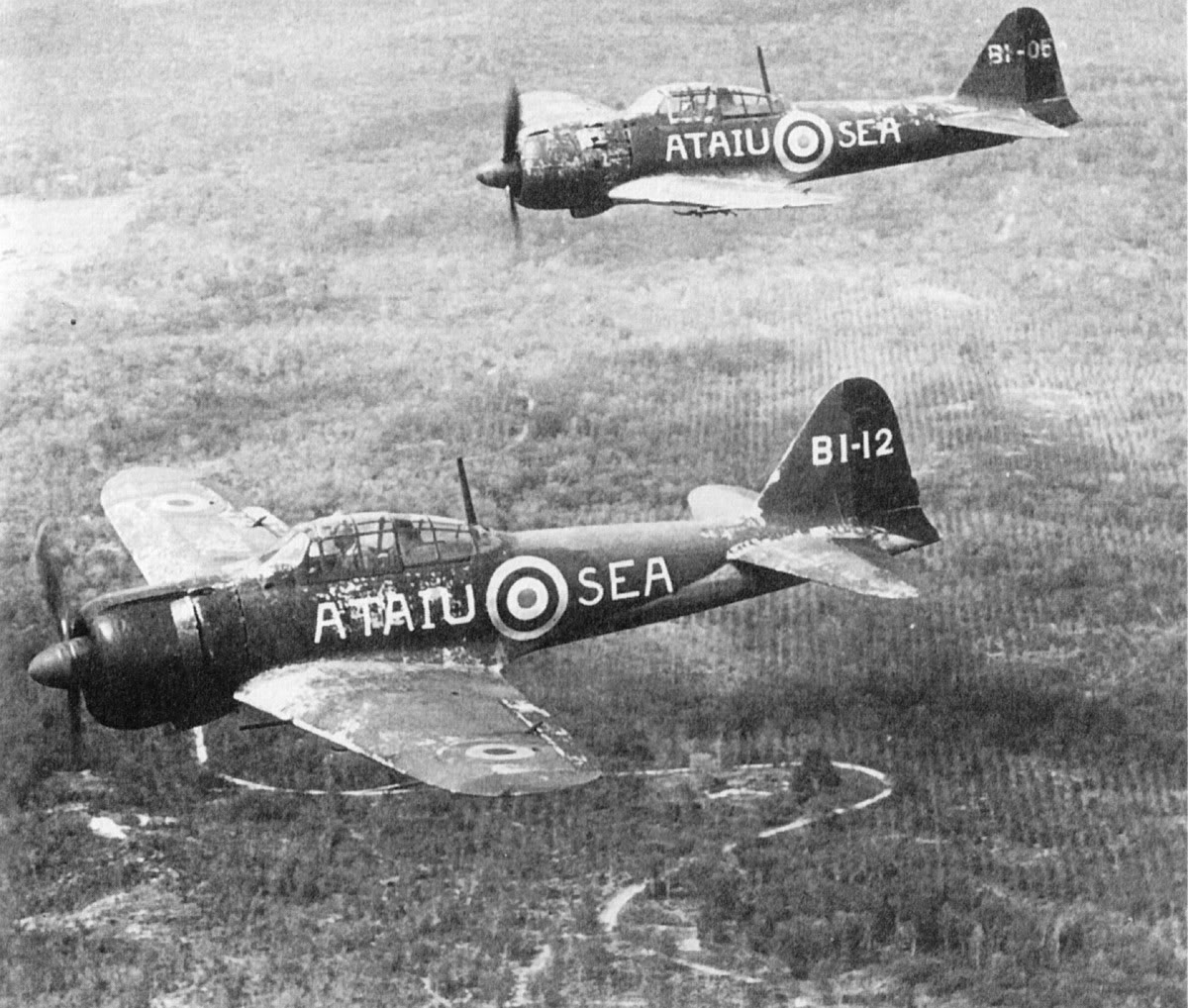
A6M2 (left) and A6M5 Zero in British Malaya being tested and evaluated by Japanese pilots under the supervision of Royal Air Force officers. The A6M5's cockpit survives today at the Imperial War Museum Duxford.

- 1 – equipped with A6M2, A6M5
- 2 – with A6M2, A6M3, A6M5
- 3 – with A6M2, A6M3
- 4 – with A6M2
- 5 – with A6M
- 6 – with A6M2, A6M3
- 11 – with A6M2, A6M3, A6M5
- 12 (mixed) – with A6M2, A6M3, A6M5
- 33 (mixed) – with A6M of diverse type
- 201 – with A6M2, A6M5
- 202 – with A6M3, A6M5
- 203 – with A6M5c, A6M6c
- 204 – with A6M3
- 251 – with A6M2, A6M3
- 252 – with A6M5c
- 253 – with A6M2, A6M3
- 261 – with A6M2, A6M5
- 302 – with A6M5c, A6M5d-S (night fighter version)
- 303 – with A6M5c
- 309 – with A6M5
- 316 – with A6M5c, A6M6c
- 332 – with A6M5c
- 341 – with A6M5, A6M5c, A6M7
- 501 – with A6M2, A6M3
- 552 – with A6M, G4M
- 582 – with A6M, D3A
- 653 – with A6M5c
- 702nd
- 705th
- 706
- 707
- 721
- 722
- 751
- 752
- 753
- 755t
- 761
- 762
- 763
- 765
- 931
- 951
- 1021

=== Seaplane fighter units ===
Units with standard use of the seaplane Nakajima A6M2-N "Rufe":

- 11th Air Flotilla (seaplane tender Kamikawa Maru)
- Yokosuka Air Fleet
- 5th Air Fleet
- 36th Air Fleet
- 452nd Air Fleet (seaplane tender Kamikawa Maru)
- 934th Air Fleet
- Toko Air Corps
- Yokosuka Air Corps (technical evaluation)
- Yokohama Air Corps
- Ōtsu Air Corps

== Thailand ==
According to John and Elke Weal in the book Combat Aircraft of World War Two, there are reports of various versions of Mitsubishi A6M2 (model 21 and A6M5, among others) being used by the Royal Thai Air Force that were supposed to be used as interceptors after WWII, during 1946–47.

== United States ==
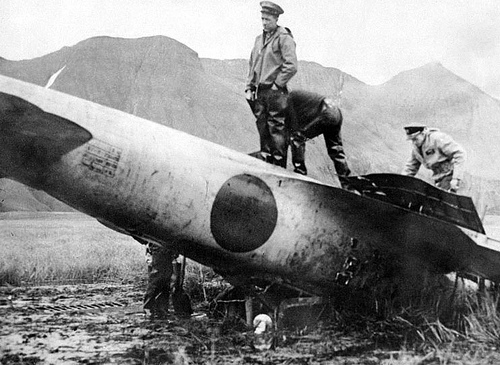
Akutan Zero is inspected by US Navy personnel on Akutan Island on July 11, 1942.

One Mitsubishi A6M2, (Note: Navy Type 0 Carrier Fighter, Model 11 s/n 3372; originally marked "V-172" and belonging to the Tainan Kōkūtai, part of "22nd Koku Sentai") piloted by Tainan buntaicho Lt. Kikuichi Inano, departed from Tainan airfield for Saigon and crashed in Leichou Pantao (also known as Leizhou or Luichow Peninsula), near the town of Qian Shan (Teitsan), China. The pilot was captured by Chinese forces on November 26, 1941, while the A6M was tested for the AVG and repainted in green and gray with Chinese signs and tail-marked as "P-5016". The aircraft was later sent by AVG to the United States as the first intact Japanese A6M fighter captured as a prize of war, and was known as the "Mystery Zero", "China Zero", or "Tiger Zeke".

After the attack on Pearl Harbor, the Americans recovered some remains of downed IJN "Zeroes" from the battle area. These included:

1. A6M2 Model 21, Serial 5289, marked "AI-154" (piloted by PO Takeshi Hirano) from Akagi
2. A6M2 Model 21, Serial 2266, marked "BII-120" (piloted by 1PO Shigenori Nishikaishi) from Hiryu
3. A6M2 Model 21, Serial 3277, marked "BI-151" (piloted by Lt. Fusata Iida) from Soryu

The "Akutan Zero" (piloted by Tadayoshi Koga) crashed on Akutan Island, Alaska, on June 3, 1942, and was later recovered intact by American Naval personnel.

== Bibliography ==
- Dorr, Robert F. and Bishop, Chris. Vietnam Air War Debrief. London:Aerospace, 1996. ISBN 1-874023-78-6.
