= NBC 7 =

NBC 7 may refer to one of the following television stations within the United States:

== Current affiliates ==
- KMNF-LD in Mankato, Minnesota
- KNSD in San Diego, California (cable channel; broadcasts on channel 39 [O&O])
- KPLC in Lake Charles, Louisiana
- KQCD-TV in Dickinson, North Dakota
- KTVB in Boise, Idaho
- KWWL (TV) in Waterloo, Iowa
- WDAM-TV in Laurel/Hattiesburg, Mississippi
- WITN in Washington / Greenville / Jacksonville / New Bern, North Carolina
- WJHG-TV in Panama City, Florida
- WPBN-TV in Traverse City, Michigan

== Formerly affiliated ==
- KAII-TV in Wailuku, Hawaii (1958 to 1996)
  - Satellite of KHON-TV in Honolulu
- KJCW (TV) in Sheridan, Wyoming (2002 to 2009)
- KOAM-TV in Pittsburg, Kansas (1953 to 1982)
- KRCR-TV in Redding, California (1956 to 1978)
- WHDH in Boston, Massachusetts (1995 to 2016)
- WSVN in Miami, Florida (1956 to 1989)
