= CBS 7 =

CBS 7 may refer to one of the following television stations in the United States:

== Current affiliates ==
- KBSH-DT in Hays, Kansas
  - Semi-satellite of KWCH-DT in Wichita, Kansas
- KBNZ-LD in Bend, Oregon
- KBZK in Bozeman, Montana
  - Semi-satellite of KXLF-TV in Butte, Montana
- KHQA-TV in Hannibal, Missouri–Quincy, Illinois
- KIRO-TV in Seattle, Washington
- KOAM-TV in Pittsburg, Kansas–Joplin, Missouri
- KOAT-DT4 in Albuquerque, New Mexico
- KOSA-TV in Odessa–Midland, Texas
- WBBJ-DT3, a digital channel of WBBJ-TV in Jackson, Tennessee
- WDBJ-TV in Roanoke–Lynchburg, Virginia
- WHIO-TV in Dayton, Ohio
- WSAW-TV in Wausau–Rhinelander, Wisconsin
- WTRF-TV in Wheeling, West Virginia–Steubenville, Ohio
- WWNY-TV in Carthage–Watertown, New York

== Formerly affiliated ==
- KATV in Little Rock, Arkansas (1953–1955)
- KBNM (later KJCW) in Sheridan, Wyoming (2002)
- KCCO-TV in Alexandria, Minnesota (1958–2017)
- KMGH-TV in Denver Colorado (1952–1995)
- KTBC in Austin, Texas (1952–1995)
- KTNL-TV in Sitka, Alaska (1966–2020)
- WHDH in Boston, Massachusetts (1982–1995)
- WNAC-TV (Boston) (1948–1961 and 1972–1982)
- WSPA-TV in Spartanburg–Greenville–Anderson, South Carolina–Asheville, North Carolina (1956–2026)
- WTVW/WMAL-TV (now WJLA-TV) in Washington, D.C. (1947–1948)
- XELD-TV in Harlingen–Weslaco–McAllen–Brownsville, Texas (licensed to Matamoros, Tamaulipas, Mexico; 1951–1953)
