= Manu Bennett =

New Zealand actor (born 1969)

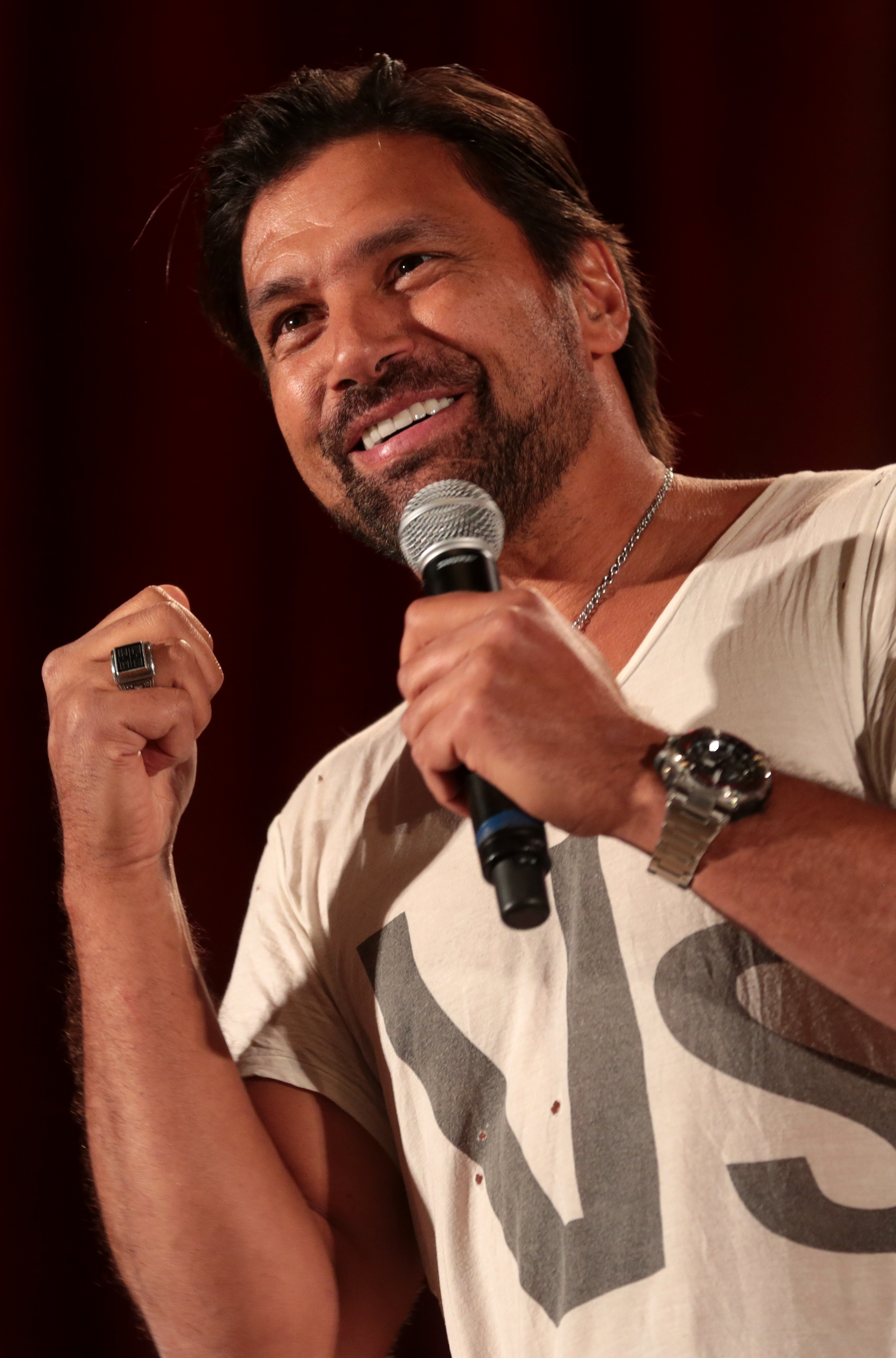
- Bennett at Phoenix Comic Fest 2018
- Born: Jonathan Manu Bennett; 10 October 1969 (age 57); Rotorua, New Zealand
- Other name: Jon Bennett
- Occupation: Actor
- Years active: 1993–present
- Children: 3

Jonathan Manu Bennett (born 10 October 1969) is a New Zealand actor. He is primarily known for portraying characters in epic fantasy works, such as Crixus in the TV series Spartacus, Allanon in The Shannara Chronicles, Slade Wilson / Deathstroke in Arrow, and Azog the Defiler in The Hobbit trilogy.

== Early life ==
Bennett was born in New Zealand in 1969. His mother Jean Bennett was an Australian bikini model and father Ted Bennett a New Zealand singer. The family moved to Australia when Bennett was a few months old. Bennett's father is of Māori (specifically Te Arawa and Ngāti Kahungunu) descent. His mother is of Scottish descent. He was raised mostly between Sydney and Newcastle in Australia, where he attended Merewether High School. In 1986, Bennett returned to New Zealand to attend Te Aute College, where he played for the 1st XV. Upon returning to Australia, Bennett was chosen in the New South Wales Schoolboys Rugby Union Team. Interested in modern dancing, classical ballet, and piano, Bennett quit rugby to attend university to study dance and drama, then traveled to Los Angeles on a scholarship to attend the Lee Strasberg Theatre Institute. In an audience Q&A in Boston, Bennett talked about the car accident he experienced at a young age that killed his mother and brother and put him in a two-week coma. At that time, his girlfriend was a ballet dancer, which got him into acting; he found it to be the medium into which he wanted to direct his emotions, saying, "Acting was my route to survival."

== Career ==
Bennett's professional acting career began in 1993 in the teen soap Paradise Beach. He then played guest roles in other Australian TV dramas, including Water Rats, All Saints, and Beastmaster. Bennett then starred alongside Claudia Karvan in the miniseries The Violent Earth, produced by French company Gaumont. In 1996, Bennett participated in theatre. In an open-air production of Lady Chatterley's Lover, based on D. H. Lawrence's novel, directed by Australian film/theatre director Robert Chuter, he played the title role, the gamekeeper Oliver Mellors in which he met model/actor Darlene Rada Ford from Bondi Beach who encouraged him to pursue more serious acting roles abroad.

In 1999, Bennett landed his first leading role in a feature film named Tomoko, shot on location in Tokyo, starring opposite Rumiko Koyanagi. In 2000, Bennett guest starred in Xena: Warrior Princess as Marc Antony, then played a role opposite Without a Trace star Anthony LaPaglia, where Bennett displayed his dancing skills as a salsa dance teacher in the award-winning Australian film, Lantana.

Bennett returned to New Zealand in 2000 to appear in the popular television drama, Shortland Street, then went on to play a cop turned lawyer in Street Legal before working with his director cousin Michael Bennett on the Māori Twilight Zone-styled series Mataku before working with Richard Taylor from the Academy Award-winning firm Weta Workshop on Creature Quest.

In August 2002, Bennett landed a screen test opposite Angelina Jolie for a part in the Tomb Raider sequel The Cradle of Life. Actor Gerard Butler ended up beating him for the role.

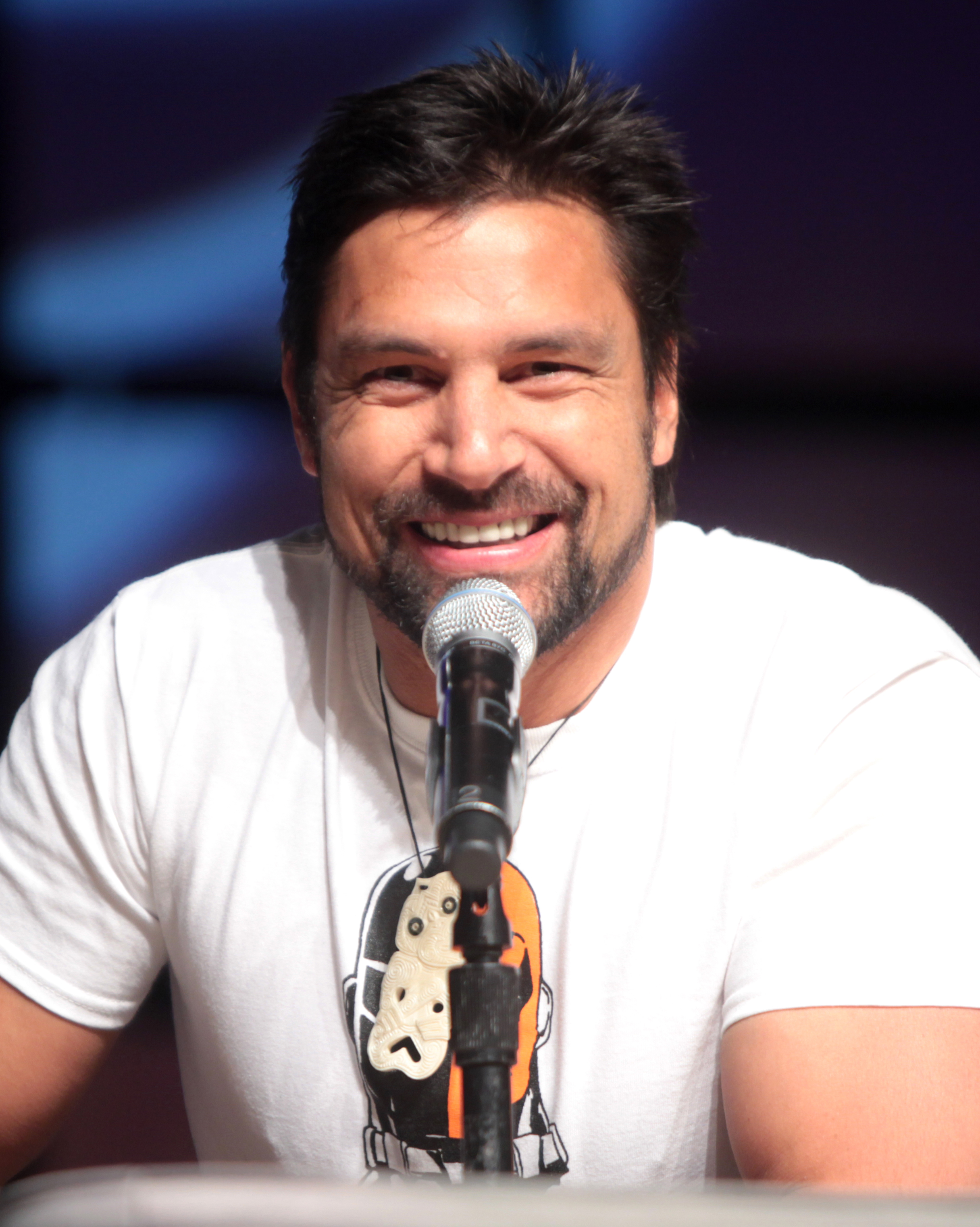
Bennett in 2014

In 2003, Bennett hosted Going Straight, a New Zealand reality show.

In 2006, Bennett was cast in The Marine alongside WWE wrestling star John Cena and Robert Patrick. In 2007, Bennett was cast as one of ten convicts alongside Stone Cold Steve Austin and Vinnie Jones in The Condemned. In 2006, Bennett was cast opposite Josh Hartnett to play Deputy Billy Kitka in the US film 30 Days of Night.

From 2010 to 2013, Bennett co-starred in the new American television series Spartacus, about the defiant gladiator Spartacus. Bennett played the key role of Crixus, Champion of Capua. He was the only cast member of the series who starred on all four seasons, as well as starring in the most episodes of this series.

In 2012, he played the villain Azog the Defiler in The Hobbit: An Unexpected Journey, and continued to portray the character in the sequels. In November 2012, Bennett was cast in the first season of Arrow as Slade Wilson, and in March 2013, he was promoted to series regular for the second season. He then made several guest appearances in subsequent seasons.

In May 2014, Bennett revealed he had lost two roles in Stargate Atlantis and the 2011 film Conan the Barbarian to actor Jason Momoa.

In December 2014, Manu was cast as the druid Allanon in MTV's television series The Shannara Chronicles.

== Personal life ==
Manu Bennett and Karin Horen have three children. The couple confirmed their split in 2017.

== Filmography ==
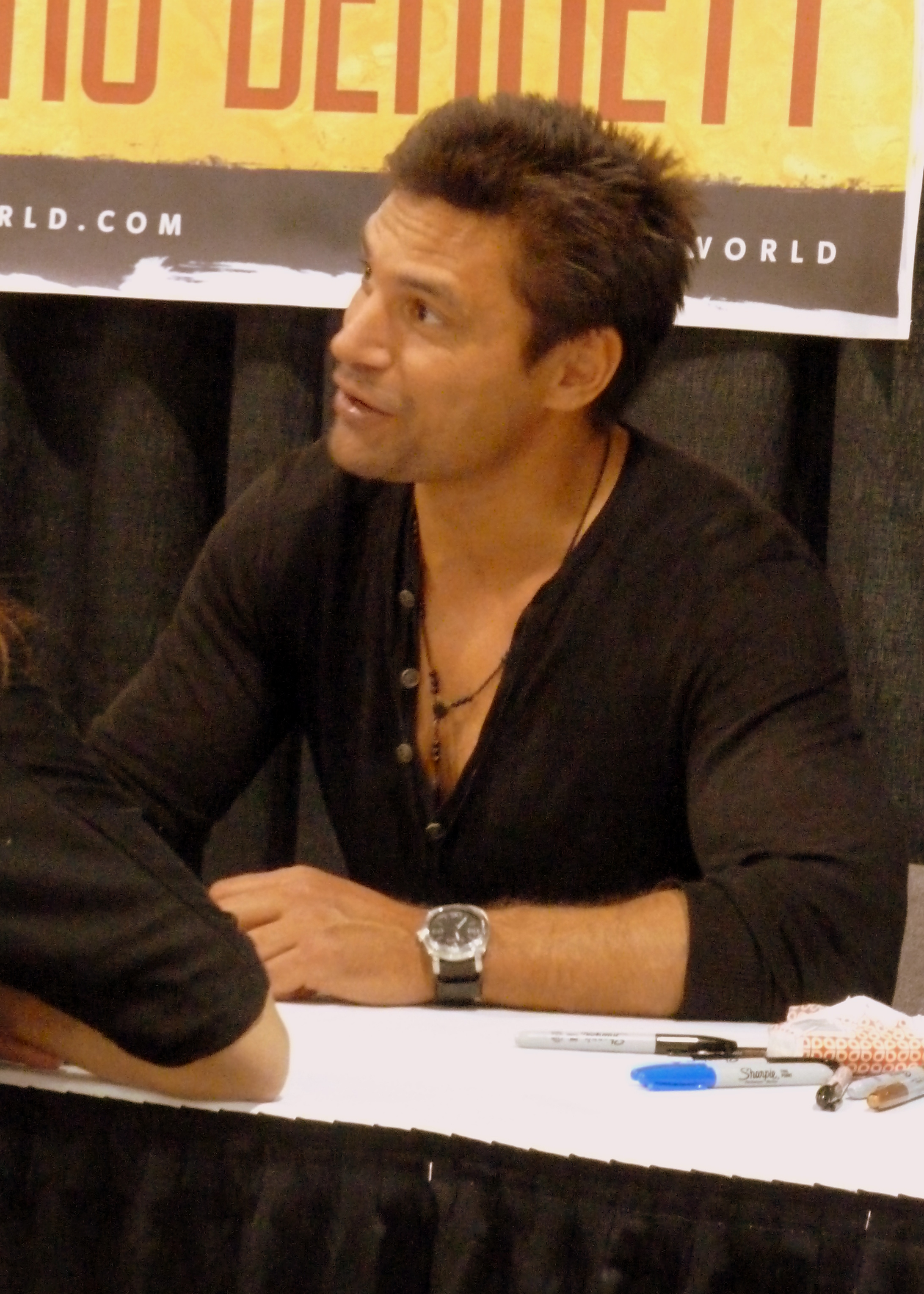
Bennett at Wizard World comic con in 2013

=== Film ===
List of performances in film
Year	Title	Role	Notes
2001	Lantana	Steve Veldez	
2006	The Marine	Bennett	
2006	The Bridge	Short film; Director, Producer	
2007	The Condemned	Paco	
2007	30 Days of Night	Deputy Billy Kitka	
2011	Sinbad and The Minotaur	Sinbad	Television film
2012	The Hobbit: An Unexpected Journey	Azog the Defiler	
2013	The Hobbit: The Desolation of Smaug	Azog the Defiler	
2014	The Hobbit: The Battle of the Five Armies	Azog the Defiler	
2016	Beta Test	Orson Creed	
2017	Death Race 2050	Frankenstein	Direct to video
2022	Muru	Kimiora	
2023	Möbius' Trip	Mission Command (voice)	Short film
2023	Pente 5 Five	Aran	
2023	Perfect Addiction	Julian	

=== Television ===
List of performances on television
Year	Title	Role	Notes
1993–1994	Paradise Beach	Kirk Barsby	254 episodes
1994	Blue Heelers	Mark Davies	Episode: "The First Stone"
1996–97	Water Rats	Joseph Lipinski	3 episodes
1998	The Violent Earth	Wanatcha DuValier	3 episodes
1998	All Saints	Darren	Episode: "Body and Soul"
1999	BeastMaster	Terron Leader	Episode: "The Legend Continues"
2000	Tales of the South Seas	David Legeure	Episode: "Fast Company"
2000	Xena: Warrior Princess	Marc Antony	Episode: "Antony and Cleopatra"
2000–01	Shortland Street	Jack Hewitt	7 episodes
2001	Head Start	Dom	Episode: "He Ain't Heavy"
2002–03	Street Legal	Matt Urlich	12 episodes
2002	Mataku	John	Episode: "Going to War"
2003	Going Straight	Himself / Host	
2008	The Strip	Brandon Bell	Episode: "Episode Thirteen"
2010–13	Spartacus	Crixus	Main role: 37 episodes
2012	Bikie Wars: Brothers in Arms	Raymond "Sunshine" Kucler	4 episodes
2013–2020	Arrow	Slade Wilson / Deathstroke	Main role (season 2); recurring role (season 1); special guest star (seasons 3, 5–6, 8); 40 episodes
2016–2017	The Shannara Chronicles	Allanon, The Warlock Lord	20 episodes
2016	American Dad!	Patrucio (voice)	Episode: "Roots"
2019	Pandora	Leone Vokk	2 episodes
2023	The Gone	Tamati Davidson	6 episodes
2023	Beyond Belief: Fact or Fiction	Hotel clerk	Episode: "Das Hotel des Grauens"
2024	The Summit	Himself	Main role (host)

=== Audio ===
Year	Title	Role	Notes
2022	Broken Road	Arlin Frey	6 episodes

=== Video games ===
Year	Title	Voice role	Notes
2014	Lego The Hobbit	Azog the Defiler	
