= Warner Bros. International Television Production New Zealand =

New Zealand-based television production company

- Logo used since 2023
- Formerly: Touchdown Television (1991–2006); Eyeworks Touchdown (2006–2008); Eyeworks New Zealand (2008–2014)
- Type: Subsidiary
- Industry: Television production and distribution
- Founded: 1991; 35 years ago in Auckland, New Zealand
- Founder: Julie Christie
- Headquarters: Auckland, New Zealand
- Owner: Skydance Corporation
- Parent: Eyeworks (2006–2014); Warner Bros. International Television Production (2014–present)
- Website: wbitvpnewzealand.com

Warner Bros. International Television Production New Zealand (formerly Touchdown Television, Eyeworks Touchdown) is a New Zealand-based television production company specialising in reality and unscripted formats, which has become a leader in the field in New Zealand, and the world. Its formats include The Chair and Treasure Island, as well as many others.

== History ==
Touchdown Television was started by producer Julie Christie in 1991, initially producing documentaries, then moving on to some reality shows, including travel and adventure series such as Mountain Dew On The Edge and Travel.co.nz, as well as foreign formats such as Changing Rooms, and Ready Steady Cook.

More recently the company has focused on creating formats for local television as well as formats for international sale. These include Treasure Island and The Chair which have both been produced in a number of countries.

In 2004, Touchdown produced a joint-venture show called The Resort for broadcasters Network Ten (Aus) and TV3 (NZ), allowing voting and featuring contestants from both countries, the show did not rate as well as hoped and was ended early when contestants failed to meet the demands of the competition.

On 8 February 2006, Touchdown was sold to Dutch TV company Eyeworks and has been renamed Eyeworks Touchdown since 1 April 2006.

Eyeworks Touchdown began production of a New Zealand series of Dragons Den in mid-2006 which screened later that year on TV One and is currently casting for a second series.

On 11 February 2014, the Warner Bros. Television Group announced that it will purchase Eyeworks' businesses outside of the United States. The acquisition was completed on 2 June of that year. The acquisition gives Warner Bros. TV production units in 15 additional territories. A few months later, Eyeworks New Zealand was rebranded as Warner Bros. International Television Production New Zealand.

== Programmes ==
Programmes Touchdown has produced include the following:

- Top of the Class
- At Home on their Own
- DIY Rescue
- Going Straight
- My House My Castle
- Game of Two Halves
- The Resort
- Treasure Island
- Treasure Island Extreme
- Celebrity Treasure Island
- So You Wannabe A Popstar?
- Ready Steady Cook
- Miss Popularity
- City Celebrity Country Nobody
- Matthew and Marc's Rocky Road
- Hot Property
- How Normal Are You?
- The Fence
- The Chair
- Captive
- Common Law
- Garden Wars
- The Sports Hour - All Fired Up
- April's Angels
- Arnotts Dreams Come True
- Bounty Hunter
- Can You Hackett
- Circus
- Coke RTR
- Colonial House
- Coming Home
- DIY Dads
- DIY Fantasies
- Driving School NZ
- Finding J Smith
- Ground Force
- Home on Their Own
- House Dates
- It's Your Money
- Living The Dream
- Mike King
- Money Doctor
- Park Rangers
- Pioneer House
- Profilers
- Property Rescue
- Some Like It Hot
- The GC
- The Mating Game
- The Money Game
- The Player
- This Is your Life
- Trading Places
- Troubleshooters
- Unichem Medlife
- Unsolved
- Weakest Link
- Weddings
- Whose House Is It Anyway?
- World Famous
- You've Gotta Have It
