= Finding J Smith =

New Zealand reality television

- TV Show Logo
- Presented by: Nick Young; Eric Young; Dominic Bowden
- Country of origin: New Zealand

Production
- Producer: Julie Christie
- Production company: Eyeworks Touchdown

Original release
- Network: TVNZ2
- Release: 2003

Finding J Smith is a New Zealand reality show, also known as Finding J Smith with Vodafone Live! The show aired in 2003 on TV2. The show consisted of contestants calling up as many people in New Zealand with a J. Smith name. $250,000 was the amount of money that was up for grabs, making it at the time the biggest prize ever offered by a New Zealand television program. The show was hosted by Nick Young, Eric Young and Dominic Bowden.

Team Murphy was the winning team for the show, who found Jenny Smith, a 32-year-old from Taihape. She was revealed as the real J Smith. The show only ran for one season.

== Teams and candidates ==
Candidate	Team	Age
Heidi Watson	Team Watson	20
Chris Watson	Team Watson	49
Richard Watson	Team Watson	46
Karen Galvan	Team Watson	33
Jacqui Watson	Team Watson	37
Bev Gillard	Team Te Pahu	25
Tim Lockhart	Team Te Pahu	25
Justin "Jae" Dwen	Team Te Pahu	25
Mark Neal	Team Te Pahu	26
Alice Reid	Team Te Pahu	23
Jodi Cockburn	Team Murphy	27
Greg Cockburn	Team Murphy	30
Lisa Murphy	Team Murphy	28
Grant "Spud" Murphy	Team Murphy	–
Jill Ellison	Team Murphy	34
