= Going Straight (TV programme) =

- Genre: Reality
- Presented by: Manu Bennett
- Country of origin: New Zealand
- Original language: English
- No. of seasons: 1

Production
- Production location: Auckland
- Production company: Touchdown Television

Original release
- Network: TV3
- Release: 2003

Going Straight is a New Zealand television reality programme by Touchdown Television that aired on TV3 in 2003. The show also aired on the United Kingdom cable channel Challenge. The programme was hosted by New Zealand actor Manu Bennett, where contestants had to continue moving in a straight line, no matter what the obstacles in the way, to compete for prize money of $NZ10,000.

== Format ==
The format of the programme challenged five contestants, wearing location monitoring equipment, to get to the end of a specified "virtual lane" across a landscape by completing three separate straight-line challenges. Contestants were eliminated each round. There was a $10,000 prize for the winner.

By 2005, the show's format had been licensed to international television channels and production companies.

== Fire stunt accident ==
In 2004, an investigation was launched into the programme after a contestant suffered severe burns following a retake of a stunt. The production company was fined $65,000 in district court for the incident. Charges were to be put to either Touchdown Television or its Warkworth District Court representative.

== Reception ==
Local media called Going Straight a show similar to Fear Factor on a sickness benefit.
