= Konoike =

Konoike is a Japanese surname. Notable people with the surname include:

- Tomoko Konoike (鴻池 朋子, born 1960), Japanese artist
- Yoshitada Konoike (鴻池 祥肇, 1940–2018), Japanese politician
