= Mental Engineering =

Television series

Mental Engineering was a public television series where show creator and host John Forde leads a panel discussion featuring critical and humorous analysis of TV commercials. The show originated as a public-access television cable TV program on the Saint Paul Neighborhood Network (SPNN) in St. Paul, Minnesota in 1997.

== Notable guests ==
Nationally-known comedians and satirists frequently appeared as panelists. Past guests include Al Franken, Lizz Winstead, Sam Simon, Greg Proops, Louis C.K., Paula Poundstone, Merrill Markoe, Naomi Klein, and Jeff Cesario.

== History ==
Forde started Mental Engineering in 1998 on cable access in St. Paul. Mental Engineering is considered by some sources to be the first public-access television show to air nationally. By September 2001, the program was airing on various public TV outlets including WGBH in Boston and WNET in New York City.

In 2002, the episode Super Commercials: A Mental Engineering Special followed Super Bowl XXXVI featured guest personalities Aisha Tyler and Lizz Winstead along with other guests from Minnesota.

By the end of 2008 140 episodes had been produced.

== Reviews and recognition ==
The series received positive reviews from several news outlets, including the New York Times, which called it "brilliant." Bill Moyers called it "the most interesting weekly half hour of social commentary and criticism on television," and PBS host Charlie Rose interviewed Forde on the ‘Charlie Rose’ show.

== Funding history ==
As underwriters fund public broadcasting shows and are recognized in the show credits, ARNAN.com was the show's first carded underwriter when production moved to KTCA. Early funding assistance came from the Lutheran Brotherhood, a fortune 500 non-profit life insurance company that is now part of Thrivent Financial, and from PBS. Seeking broader funding, the show suspended production for 2003–2004, and returned to public TV in 2005.

== Similar concepts ==
Two somewhat similar television shows aired on public TV stations in the 1960s: Public Broadcast Laboratory and Your Dollar's Worth, both sponsored by the Ford Foundation.

The Gruen Transfer, a similar program deconstructing advertisements, was launched by the Australian public television network in 2008. The show is currently being marketed by Fox Look under the name "The Big Sell".

== See also ==
- Super Bowl Advertising

== Sources ==
- Lash, Stephanie (September 4, 2000), "Forde's ad literacy, humor fight against consumer lust.", Current, archived from the original on February 13, 2005
- "PBS goes for Mental Engineering on Super Bowl Sunday.", Current, January 28, 2002, archived from the original on February 13, 2005
- Reid Day, Catherine (September 2001), "One Cultural Creative's Journey through the Between.", EDGE News
- Lambert, Brian (November 12, 2000), "Ad Nauseam: With healthy skepticism, St. Paul's Mental Engineering bites the advertising hand that feeds most of TV programming.", Saint Paul Pioneer Press
- St. Anthony, Neal (October 3, 2005), "Neal St. Anthony: Deconstructing advertisements", Star Tribune
