= The Chair (game show) =

American television game show

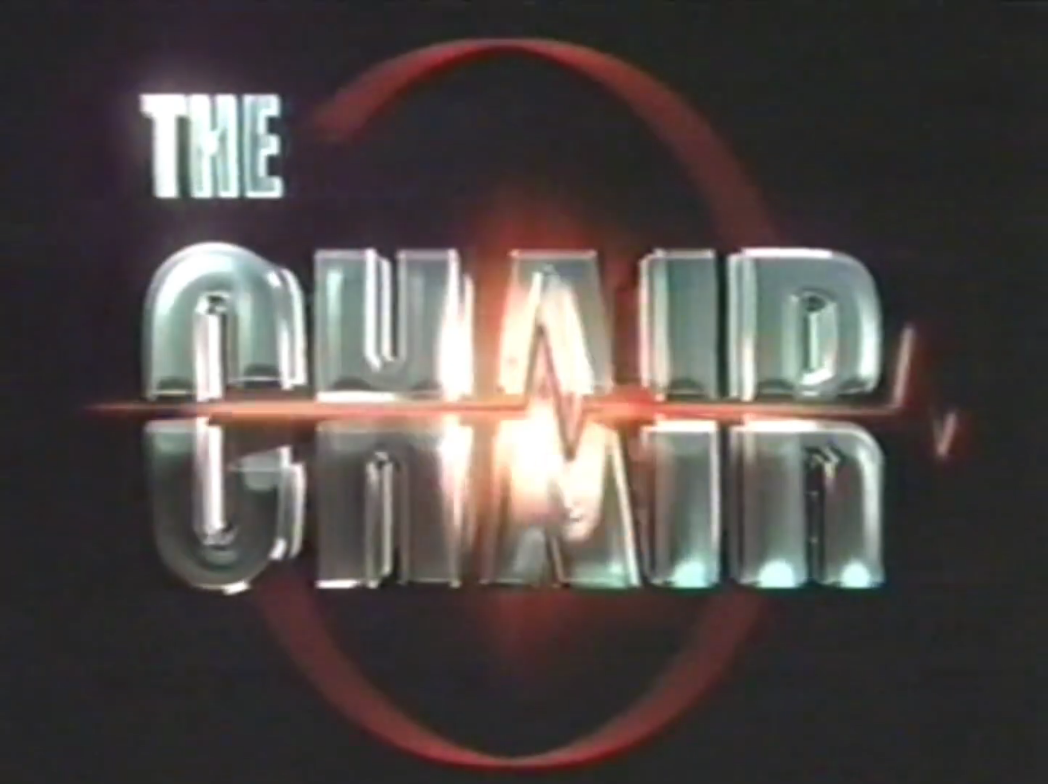
- Genre: Game show
- Created by: Julie Christie; Darryl McEwen; Brian Bigg
- Written by: Phil Andres; Charles Bacer; Robert Hammersley; Gary Stuart Kaplan; Gary Lucy; Teresa Strasser
- Directed by: Michael A. Simon
- Presented by: John McEnroe
- Composers: Alan Paul Ett; SongZu; Scott Liggett; Tim Wynn
- Countries of origin: United States; New Zealand
- No. of seasons: 1
- No. of episodes: 13 (6 unaired)

Production
- Executive producers: Julie Christie; Darryl McEwen; Andrew J. Golder; Gregory V. Sherman; Ann Miller-George
- Producers: Paul Wernick; Craig W. Hoffman
- Production location: Los Angeles
- Editor: Bill DeRonde
- Running time: 44 minutes
- Production companies: Touchdown Television (Touchdown Productions); Trailpolis Entertainment Group; Target Distribution, Ltd. (William Morris Agency)

Original release
- Network: ABC
- Release: January 15 – March 4, 2002

The Chair is an American game show that was created by Julie Christie, Darryl McEwen and Brian Bigg for Touchdown Television (now Warner Bros. International Television Production New Zealand). Although The Chair was originally developed in New Zealand, the first country where the program aired in was the United States. The American version, which was hosted by former tennis champion John McEnroe, aired on ABC for seven episodes from January 15 to March 4, 2002; the American version would be canceled with six episodes remaining unaired of its original 13-episode order. McEnroe would later host the British version, which aired between August 31 and November 9, 2002, on BBC One.

== Format ==
Prospective contestants underwent extensive medical examination before appearing. They were given intelligence tests and had their heart monitored for several hours, among other diagnostic procedures to see how they would react to sudden surprises. If they were declared fit, they moved on to the game.

Question round

Question	Value	Redline threshold	Redline penalty (per second)	Maximum possible total
1	$5,000	160%-170%	($100)	$10,000
2	$10,000	155%-165%	($100)	$20,000
3	$15,000	150%-160%	($200)	$35,000
4	$25,000	145%-155%	($300)	$60,000
5	$40,000	140%-150%	($400)	$100,000
6	$50,000	135%-145%	($500)	$150,000
7	$100,000	130%-140%	($1,000)	$250,000

Once seated in the Chair, the contestant found themselves looking up at a large video screen on which the host's image was displayed, as well as the information for the current question. They began with a stake of $5,000 and could increase it to a maximum of $250,000 by answering a series of seven questions. The contestant's heart rate was continuously measured throughout the game and compared to a "redline" threshold. This value started at 60% (later 70%) above the resting heart rate, and it was reduced by 5% of the resting heart rate after each question (with a maximum redline threshold of between 130% and 140% for the final question). For example, a contestant with a resting heart rate of 80 would have an initial redline threshold of 128 or 136 (160% and 170% of the resting rate, respectively), which would drop by 4 (5%) after each question.

For each question except the fifth, a list of four possible answers was presented, and then the question itself was read. The host would then tell the contestant whether or not an answer could be accepted, depending on their heart rate at the moment.

Money was subtracted from the contestant's total for every second that their heart rate exceeded the redline value ("redlining"). In addition, they were ineligible to give an answer during this time; only while the heart rate was no higher than the threshold number could an answer be given. Redlining between questions, or while a question was being asked, mostly carried no penalty; for at least the first episode, the penalty went into effect when the host began reading the question, but later it would be after the whole question had been read.

The third question involved recalling information from a series of images that appeared on the screen above them and required the player to remember something specific or particular details about one image, the fifth required the player to list items pertaining to a given category, and the seventh involved choosing which event occurred first or last (this question type would be eliminated later in the show's run). After the fourth question, the host made a one-time offer: keep the redline rate constant for the next question, at a cost of $25,000; this offer was rarely accepted.

As long as the contestant had money in their account and continued to answer questions correctly, the game continued until all seven questions were answered correctly. The game prematurely ended when a contestant answered a single question incorrectly, lost all of their money due to redlining, or committed a third violation of the countermeasure rule.

If the contestant answered a question incorrectly, they left with whatever amount they had "stabilized" (see below). Correctly answering every question awarded the contestant all of the money in their account, for a potential top prize of $250,000 if they had no redlining penalties.

Heartstoppers

At two points during the contestant's campaign, a "heartstopper" event took place. These were designed to raise the heart rate (coming face to face with an alligator or a hive of bees, a large pendulum swinging just overhead, having McEnroe serve tennis balls at the contestant's head, etc.). Precautions were taken to ensure the contestant's safety during these events, such as a pane of heavy plastic being set just in front of their face as McEnroe served. If the contestant could endure the event for 15 seconds (20 seconds in some versions), the event would end. If they went over the redline rate, the event continued until the heart rate was under control, and the contestant lost money at the rate for the previously answered question. In the Korean version, the host is responsible for initiating the Heartstopper by saying, simply enough, "start the Heartstopper", at which point the countdown begins.

In some international versions of the show (usually for the first Heartstopper only), a contestant must answer rapid-fire free-response questions in a 45-second bonus round which is designed to add 1 heartbeat back to the redline threshold for each correct answer. In the original New Zealand version, for the second Heartstopper, the contestant must answer 7 rapid-fire questions in a 60-second bonus round on one of the three categories shown on the screen above them. Each correct answer it was given, they will earn money but with each wrong answer to each question, they will be monetarily penalized from only their stabilized winnings.

Stabilization

After answering the $15,000 question correctly (for a potential prize of $35,000), the contestant earned the chance to "stabilize". Once during the rest of the game, they could exercise this option after a correct answer; if they missed a question or received their third violation of the countermeasure rule, they would leave with the money won up to the "stabilize" point. However, if the contestant redlined in the interim and went below the stabilized amount, the stabilized amount would fall and match the current prize amount.

In the British version of the show, a contestant would be required to stabilize after correctly answering the fifth question if they had not yet done so by that point.

Countermeasure rule

Contestants were required to stay alert during the game at all times. If a contestant tried to close their eyes or perform some other task in an attempt to lower the heart rate, the host gave a warning. If a contestant received a third violation or suffered a medical issue during the game, they were disqualified from the game; contestants could still leave with their stabilized amount. The latter never happened, though one contestant on the US show received two violations and was almost disqualified for the above actions. On the first episode, one contestant closed her eyes for the entire time on the one Heartstopper she reached and was not penalized. In the Korean version, this warning rule only applied in Heartstoppers.

== Broadcast history ==
The Chair aired for seven episodes on ABC between January 15 and March 4, 2002, but not before two people managed to answer the final question correctly; Kris Derrico (née Mackerer) won $224,600 (equivalent to $402,036 in 2025) on the fourth episode that aired on February 5 and Steven Benjamin won the maximum $250,000 (equivalent to $447,502 in 2025) on the seventh and final episode that aired on March 4. On January 29, 2002, just a week before Mackerer's $224,600 win, another player, Dean Sheffron, reached the last question with a total of $132,200 but lost it all due to redlining.

Thirteen episodes were taped, but only seven were broadcast. Many episodes were taped during post-midnight hours to hurry production in order to compete with Fox's show The Chamber (which was canceled after three episodes of its six-episode order were aired). Both programs would air during NBC's coverage of the 2002 Winter Olympics, which resulted in low ratings and became a factor in the cancellation of both programs (along with high production costs).

=== The Chamber vs. The Chair ===
The Chair premiered around the same time as Fox's torture show The Chamber. The production companies fought over this, each claiming the other show was a rip-off of theirs. A lawsuit was filed against Fox and the production company of The Chamber by the New Zealand production company of The Chair, Touchdown Television, but nothing became of it.

== International versions ==
Apart from the US version being aired first, it has led to recreation of becoming a worldwide franchise as the show was adapted and recreated in several other countries. Most international versions' intros often have the shape of the heart on "The Chair", including the original New Zealand version (except the German version). All these international versions were distributed by UK distributor Target Entertainment (or Target TV).

Country	Local name	Host	Network	Top Prize	Premiere/Air dates/First year broadcast
(Arab League) Arab World	الكرسي; El Kursi	Ibrahim Abu Joudeh	Abu Dhabi TV	US$100,000	February 17, 2003
Austria	The Chair: Nimm Platz in der Hölle	Oliver Stamm	ATV	€25,000	June 2003
Bulgaria	Столът; Stolat	Asparuh Minchev	NOVA	25,000 лева	2002–2003
France	Zone Rouge	Jean-Pierre Foucault	TF1	€15,000 €30,000	January 6, 2003 – April 29, 2005
Germany	Puls Limit: Jeder Herzschlag zählt	Peer Kusmagk	VOX	€20,000	April 22, 2003 – June 10, 2003
Greece	Στα Όρια; Sta Oria	Kostas Apostolidis	ANT1	€50,000	October 2002 – December 2002
Japan	ザ・チェアー; The Chair	Masanori Hamada	TBS	¥10,000,000	May 25, 2005 – September 28, 2005
Mexico	La Silla	Juan Manuel Bernal	TV Azteca	MX$250,000	2005
Malaysia	The Chair	Yang Wei Han; Dylan Liong	NTV7	RM13,250	2002–2005
New Zealand (original version)	The Chair	Matthew Ridge	TV2	NZ$50,000	April 2, 2002 – June 4, 2002
Russia	Кресло; Kreslo	Fedor Bondarchuk	STS	₽ 410,000	September 7, 2002 – August 28, 2004
South Korea	더 체어 코리아; The Chair Korea	Seo Gyeong-seok	KBS	₩20,000,000	December 14, 2011
South Korea	더 체어 코리아; The Chair Korea	Shin Dong-yup	KBS	₩50,000,000	March 14, 2012
Spain	La Silla	Constantino Romero	Telemadrid; Canal Sur; ETB	€100,000	June 2002 – August 2002
Thailand	The Chair เก้าอี้ระทึก; The Chair Kao-Ie-Ra-Teuk	Noppon Komarachun	BBTV CH7	฿3,000,000	July 9, 2003 – November 26, 2003
Thailand	The Chair เก้าอี้ระทึก; The Chair Kao-Ie-Ra-Teuk	John Rattanaveroj	BBTV CH7	฿3,000,000	July 9, 2003 – November 26, 2003
Turkey	Koltuk	Osmantan Erkır	Kanal D	₺ 250,000,000,000	April 10, 2002
Turkey	Koltuk	Osmantan Erkır	Kanal D	₺ 100,000,000,000	April 10, 2002
United States(First broadcast)	The Chair	John McEnroe	ABC	US$250,000	January 15, 2002 – March 18, 2002
United Kingdom	The Chair	John McEnroe	BBC One	£50,000	August 31, 2002 – November 9, 2002
