= Tomoyo =

- Pronunciation: [tomoyo]
- Gender: Female
- Language: Japanese

Origin
- Origin: Japanese
- Meaning: Different meanings depending on the kanji used
- Region of origin: Japan

Tomoyo is a feminine Japanese given name.

== Written forms ==
Tomoyo can be written using different kanji characters and can mean:

- 知世, "wisdom, world"
- 友世, "friend, world"
- 倫世, "ethics, world"
- 智代, "knowledge, world"
- 灯代, "light, world"
- 知葉, "wisdom, leaf"
- 朋与, "friend, bestow"

The name can also be written in hiragana (ともよ) or katakana (トモヨ).

== People with the name ==
- Tomoyo Harada (知世; born 1967), Japanese actress and singer
- Tomoyo Kurosawa (ともよ; born 1996), Japanese voice actress
- Tomoyo Matsumoto (知世; born 1987), former member of the rock group Bon-Bon Blanco
- Tomoyo Nonaka (ともよ; born 1954), Japanese television personality and businesswoman
- Tomoyo Oshima (ともよ; born 1949), Japanese film editor
- Tomoyo Shibata (倫世; born 1974), Japanese former announcer
- Tomoyo Takayanagi (高柳 知葉; born 1994), Japanese voice actress

== Fictional characters ==
- Tomoyo, a character from the novel Ghostwritten
- Tomoyo Daidōji (知世), a character from Cardcaptor Sakura
- Tomoyo Hime (知世), an alter-ego of Tomoyo Daidōji in Tsubasa: Reservoir Chronicle
- Tomoko Hanasaki (知世), a character from the manga series G-Taste
- Tomoyo Kanzaki (灯代), a character from the light novel series When Supernatural Battles Became Commonplace
- Tomoyo Kōsaka (友世), a character from the manga series A Devil and Her Love Song
- Tomoyo Kurobe (朋与), a character from the anime series True Tears
- Tomoyo Osaka (智世), a character from the manga series Crimson Hero
- Tomoyo Sakagami (智代), a character from the visual novel, manga, and anime series Clannad
- Tomoyo Sakurai (智代), a character from the manga series Heaven's Lost Property
- Tomoyo Wakagi (知葉), a character from the anime series Key the Metal Idol

== See also ==
- Tomoyo After: It's a Wonderful Life
- TOMOYO Linux, a Linux security module
