= The Chamber (game show) =

2002 American game show

- Genre: Game show
- Created by: Mike Darnell
- Directed by: Don Weiner
- Presented by: Rick Schwartz
- Composer: Dave Russo
- Country of origin: United States
- Original language: English
- No. of episodes: 6 (3 unaired)

Production
- Executive producers: Dick Clark; Barry Adelman; Don Weiner
- Producers: R. A. Clark; Cindy Clark
- Production locations: Hollywood Center Studios; Hollywood, California
- Running time: approx. 44 minutes
- Production company: Dick Clark Productions

Original release
- Network: Fox
- Release: January 13 – January 25, 2002

The Chamber is an American game show that aired on Fox in January 2002. The show featured contestants answering questions while strapped into a torture chamber, in which they were exposed to either very hot or very cold temperatures alongside other environmental extremes, such as high winds or simulated earthquakes. Sportscaster Rick Schwartz hosted the show. After only three of its six taped episodes were aired, the series was cancelled due to declining ratings and controversy over the show's content.

== Gameplay ==
=== Pre-game faceoff ===
To begin, two contestants (always one male and one female) were given a category by host Rick Schwartz. The contestants went back and forth, providing a single answer that fit the category, until one person either gave an incorrect answer, duplicated an answer, or took too much time. At that moment, the opponent could score a point by giving one more right answer. The first to score two points in this way moved on to the main game.

=== Main game ===
Before entering the Chamber, the contestant was offered a $500 buyout to leave the game. To begin, the contestant was strapped into a chair, arms raised over the head. During the pre-game setup, a computer would choose whether the contestant would play against the "hot" or "cold" chamber.

=== Rules ===
Each player's goal was to answer as many questions, and to last in the chamber as long as possible. The player would be said to have won if they remained in the chamber, correctly answering questions through all seven rounds. Otherwise, the game could end in any of the following ways:

- Answering two consecutive questions incorrectly.
- The player's "stress quotient" exceeding a predetermined "Danger Zone" threshold for 20 seconds. Viewers only knew that it was an equation that used blood pressure, heart rate and body temperature as variables. However, unlike ABC's The Chair, players were not penalized monetarily for exceeding their Danger Zone.
- The show's medical staff could stop the game if they felt that the player would not be able to continue, or had been rendered unconscious from the stress. Neither of these happened, though one contestant, Jennifer Basa, nearly reached that point, and had to receive clearance from the show's medical staff in order to continue.
- The player could voluntarily end the game by saying, "Stop the chamber!"

As each round began, one minute was put on the clock and questions were asked to the player, each worth $1,000 if answered correctly. If the game ended for any of the aforementioned reasons above, the money was cut in half. If the player beat the level, the game would go into stop down mode for ten seconds, allowing Schwartz to check the contestant's status, after which the conditions inside would intensify. The maximum amount of questions was not stated, but with six questions per level and seven levels, the potential top prize would be $126,000.

==== Conditions ====
If the winner could also manage to answer 25 questions or more correctly, the total winnings would be tripled. Additionally, that environment would be retired, and something new created. It was reported that plans for future chambers centered around themes such as water, electric (shock) or insects; Bill Carter of The New York Times wrote that the latter may have involved "500 flies" released into the chamber. Only two variants of the chamber were depicted on the episodes that aired: a "hot" chamber and a "cold" chamber.

Chamber	Chamber-specific features	Features of both chambers
Hot	Internal temperature beginning at 110 °F (43 °C) and increasing toward a maximum of 150 °F (66 °C).; Movement of the chair beginning at the second level; first back and forth, then up and down, then 270 degree rotations, and complete circles.; Jets shooting flames around the contestant.	Wind gusts of 40 miles per hour (64 km/h).; Air cannons periodically blasting toward the contestant with up to 140 miles per hour (230 km/h) winds.; Simulated earthquakes, increasing in intensity.; Electrodes contracting the player's muscles.; Oxygen levels gradually descending to 70%.
Cold	Internal temperature beginning at 30 °F (−1 °C) and decreasing toward a minimum of −20 °F (−29 °C).; Contestant occasionally sprayed with water, causing ice to form on their body.	Wind gusts of 40 miles per hour (64 km/h).; Air cannons periodically blasting toward the contestant with up to 140 miles per hour (230 km/h) winds.; Simulated earthquakes, increasing in intensity.; Electrodes contracting the player's muscles.; Oxygen levels gradually descending to 70%.

=== Show format ===
For the first two aired episodes, there were three games played per hour. For the final episode, a fourth game was added to fill out the time. A male voice (Tony Rodgers) asked the questions, and a female voice (Karly Rothenberg) would let contestants and viewers know when the Chamber was transitioning into higher levels and shutting down. However, on the last-aired episode, Schwartz asked the questions as well as conducting interviews during the down time.

== Production ==
The series was developed by Mike Darnell, then head of alternative programming at Fox, in conjunction with Dick Clark Productions. Darnell claimed he was inspired by Fear Factor, which had debuted on NBC in 2001, and wanted The Chamber to emphasize the "visceral" effects the game had on the contestants, telling Bill Carter of The New York Times, "I want to hear if they are in pain or suffering". Preston Beckman, a fellow Fox executive, believed Darnell conceived and produced the show with the intent of leading viewers to wonder if "Fox might actually kill someone on television".

The producers of the ABC game show The Chair, which also premiered in early 2002 and had previously been pitched to Darnell at Fox, sued over alleged similarities between the two programs, including contestants answering trivia questions in a high-stress environment with their vital signs monitored throughout. Fox countersued, claiming that the ABC program had sent producers to "spy on the set" of The Chamber. In a 2007 book, Carter reports that Darnell did in fact conceive the show as a response to The Chair, and that The Chamber was rushed into production in November 2001 after ABC beat out Fox for the rights to the other show.

The Chamber began taping at Hollywood Center Studios in late December 2001. Sportscaster Matt Vasgersian was initially chosen to host, but objected to the show's content and quit, walking off set "in disgust" during a rehearsal. He was replaced by Rick Schwartz, a sports radio host in Los Angeles. During production, a technical malfunction briefly left a contestant trapped inside the hot chamber, with crew members unable to release them from the set or turn off the heating effects for "some moments," though they were freed without injury. Gail Berman, then the president of Fox, was on set at the time and greatly disturbed by the incident.

Being produced in parallel with The Chair, ABC and Fox competed to get their respective shows on the air first, with The Chamber ultimately premiering on Sunday, January 13, 2002, two days before The Chair.

== Reception ==
The Chamber received negative reviews, with Carter reporting that the show caused "a critical outcry over subjecting people to what appeared to be torture for the entertainment of television viewers". The Baltimore Sun's Kevin Cowherd called the show "a sordid, putrid mess". In Variety, Phil Gallo described it as "a prototype for the joy-free gameshow".

The series premiered to around ten million viewers in the United States, performing best among younger audiences, but viewership had declined to 5.6 million by the third episode, when it had been moved to Friday nights. It was cancelled after Fox executives concluded that the controversy around the show, coupled with low viewership, left no reason for its continuation.
