= Game On (2002 game show) =

- Country of origin: United States
- No. of episodes: 14

Production
- Running time: 22 minutes

Original release
- Network: G4
- Release: May 1 – November 6, 2002

Game On is a game show that aired as part of G4's original 13-show line-up. It was filmed all over the country as the hosts invite people off the street to compete against each other in video games. The hosts, Randy Kagan and Matt Gallant, would choose a side and then the losing host would be humiliated (normally in public). The Game On crew included producer Don Handfield, production manager Keith Worthington, associate producer Brian Mayer, production assistant Michael Leffler, and production associate Nicki La Rosa.

Game On shot fourteen episodes and then was canceled after creator and producer Don Handfield left G4 to pursue a career in film. The final episode aired on November 6, 2002.
