= Julie Christie (producer) =

New Zealand television producer and businessperson

Dame Julie Christie DNZM
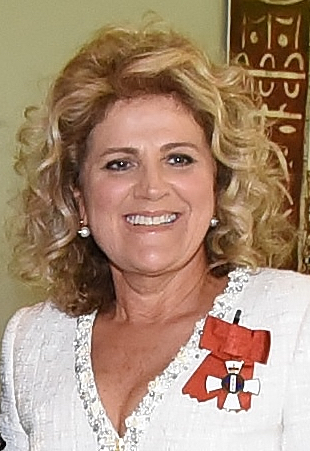
- Christie in 2017
- Born: Julie Claire Molloy; 1961 or 1962 (age 63–64)
- Citizenship: New Zealand
- Occupation: Television producer
- Spouse(s): Simon Lamond; Louis Jones
- Relatives: Leo Molloy (brother)

Dame Julie Claire Molloy Christie DNZM (née Molloy; born 1961 or 1962) is a New Zealand businesswoman and television producer. She founded Touchdown Productions, an international television company, and served as its CEO. Touchdown Productions was acquired by Dutch media company Eyeworks in 2006, and later sold to Warner Bros.

== Biography ==
Christie was born in approximately 1962 and raised in Greymouth. She is the sister of Leo Molloy. At age 17, she moved to Wellington and began working in newspaper journalism.

After a decade as a sports sub-editor for newspapers, Christie transitioned to research for broadcaster Neil Roberts at Communicado production house. In 1991, she established her own company, Touchdown Productions.

Touchdown became a major exporter of television formats to 29 countries, most notably the game show The Chair for ABC in the US and the BBC, and the reality game show Treasure Island.

In the 2007 Queen's Birthday Honours, she was appointed an Officer of the New Zealand Order of Merit, for services to television. In the 2017 Queen's Birthday Honours, she was promoted to Dame Companion of the New Zealand Order of Merit, for services to governance and the television industry.

In 2021, Christie acquired a majority shareholding in the international natural history TV and documentary production company NHNZ, and changed the name to NHNZ Worldwide. She is currently CEO.

== Memberships ==
- Rugby World Cup 2011 – Member of the Organising Board
- New Zealand Rugby Union – Member of the Commercial Committee 2012 to 2018
- New Zealand Trade and Enterprise – Board Member 2009 to 2015
- New Zealand Steering Group for World Expo Dubai 2020
- All Blacks Experience – Chair
- Development West Coast – Board member 2017 to 2022, Deputy Chair 2021 to 2022
- Rugby World Cup 2021 – Organising Committee Chair
