= Tomoko Konoike =

Japanese artist (born 1960)

- Born: 1960 (age 65–66); Akita, Japan
- Education: Tokyo University of the Arts

Tomoko Konoike (鴻池朋子) (born 1960) is a Japanese contemporary multimedia artist. She is best known for her large-scale installations and Nihonga-style surreal paintings.

== Biography ==
Konoike was born in Akita, Japan. She graduated from the Department of Japanese Painting at the Tokyo University of the Arts. She worked as a toy designer before becoming a professional artist in 1988. She took a short hiatus from her artistic practice after the 2011 Tōhoku earthquake and tsunami.

== Artwork ==
As an artist, Konoike explores themes from mythology, folklore, and nature to create surreal and vibrant depictions of humans and animals in a range of media. Her work includes animation, drawing, painting, mixed-media sculpture and installations, textiles, and prints.

Konoike regularly exhibits her work solo both in Japan and abroad, and has taken part in several international group exhibitions. Her work is included in the collections of museums such as the Art Institute of Chicago, the Mori Art Museum, the Ohara Museum of Art, and the Spencer Museum of Art In 2016, Konoike was awarded the Japanese Ministry of Education’s Art Encouragement Prize for her solo exhibition Primordial Violence.

== Exhibitions ==
=== Solo exhibitions ===
- The Planets Are Temporarily Hidden by Clouds, 2006, Mizuma Gallery, Naka-Meguro
- Chapter #0, 2006, Ohara Museum of Art, Okayama
- Inter-Traveller (Playing with Myth), 2009, Tokyo Opera City Art Gallery
- Earthshine, 2013, Gallery Wendi Norris, San Francisco
- Skin, Needle, Thread, 2016, Niigata Bandaijima Art Museum
- Primordial Violence, 2015-17, Kanagawa Kenmin Hall, the Museum of Modern Art, Gunma, and the Niigata Bandaijima Art Museum.
- Fur Story, 2018, Leeds Arts University
- Little Fur Anger, 2018, Gallery Kido Press
- Hunter Gatherer, 2018, Akita Museum of Modern Art
- FLIP (Jam Session: The Ishibashi Foundation Collection x Tomoko Konoike), 2020, Artizon Museum
- Stories Stitched and Sewn, 2021, Centre for Contemporary Arts
- The Birth of Seeing, 2022, Takamatsu Art Museum

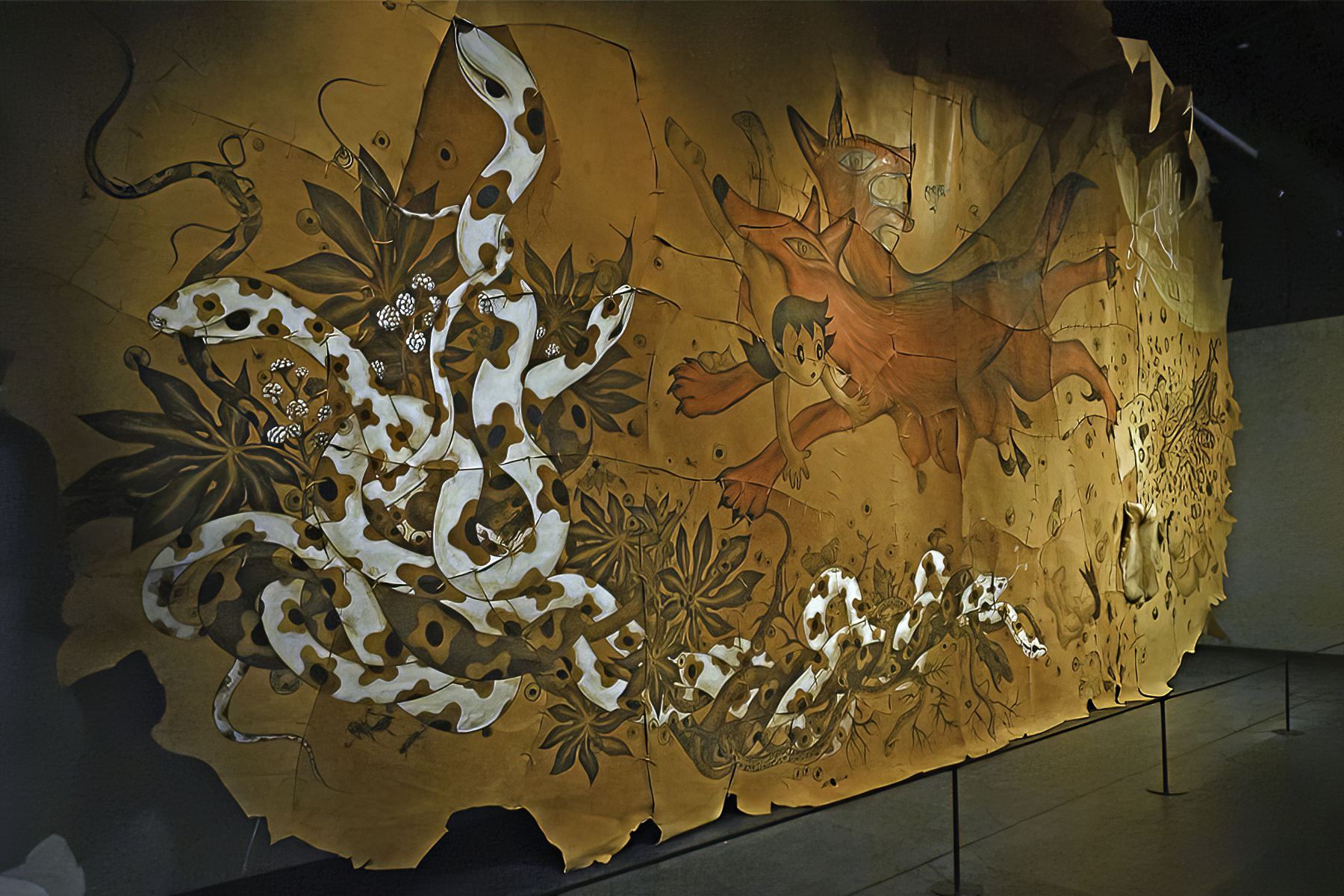
An installation view of "Shizuka's Cave" by Tomoko Konoike at the 2022 Doraemon Exhibition, National Museum of Singapore

=== Group exhibitions ===
- Guangzhou Triennale, 2008
- Busan Biennale, 2010
- Temporal Turn, 2016, Spencer Museum of Art, University of Kansas
- Nous, 2016, 21st Century Museum of Contemporary Art, Kanazawa
- Japan—Spirits of Nature, 2017, Nordic Watercolor Museum
- Oku-Noto Triennale, 2017
- Echoes from the Past, 2019, Kerava Art Museum
- Setouchi International Art Festival 2019
- Timeless Conversations, 2020, National Art Center, Tokyo
- Glasgow International 2021
- Doraemon Exhibition, 2022, National Museum of Singapore
