= KJCW (TV) =

Television station in Sheridan, Wyoming (2002–2009)

- Sheridan, Wyoming; United States
- Channels: Analog: 7 (VHF)

Programming
- Affiliations: CBS (via KTVQ, April–November 2002); NBC (sole affiliation, November 2002–2003; as satellite of KCWY, 2003–2009)

Ownership
- Owner: Western Family Television, Inc.

History
- First air date: April 2002
- Last air date: May 9, 2009 (license deleted on December 23, 2010)
- Former call signs: KBNM (April–November 2002); KSWY (November 2002–2010)

Technical information
- Facility ID: 81191
- ERP: 0.125 kW
- HAAT: −52 m (−171 ft)
- Transmitter coordinates: 44°46′42.0″N 106°56′16.0″W

KJCW (channel 7) was a television station in Sheridan, Wyoming, United States, owned by Western Family Television. Its license was canceled and call sign deleted on December 23, 2010.

== History ==
The logo from 2002 to 2010, back when the station was called KSWY.

The station signed on in April 2002 as KBNM under the ownership of Sunbelt Communications Company. It displaced K07HC, a translator for CBS affiliate KTVQ (channel 2) in Billings, Montana, to channel 9 as K09XK; in its earliest months, KBNM served as a temporary satellite of KTVQ, but with plans to become an NBC affiliate. After joining NBC, the station, which was renamed KSWY on November 1, 2002, served as a pass-through for NBC programming, with virtually no local content (including commercials); this ended on September 1, 2003, at which point it became a satellite of sister station KCWY (channel 13) in Casper, Wyoming (which joined NBC that same day).

In 2008, Sunbelt exchanged KSWY to Western Family Television in exchange for KJCW-LP (channel 29), which had previously been listed as a JCTV affiliate. When the sale closed on May 9, 2009, KSWY went silent due to the loss of its tower site; its programming then moved to channel 29, renamed KSWY-LP. The KSWY call sign remained on channel 7 as well until May 4, 2010, when it took the KJCW callsign abandoned by KSWY-LP a year prior. The station proposed to return to the air (with the JCTV programming previously seen on KJCW-LP/KSWY-LP) from a temporary site as it continued to seek a permanent transmitter location. On December 23, 2010, the FCC canceled its license and deleted the KJCW call sign; its records indicated that the station did not return to the air within a year of May 9, 2009, triggering the automatic expiration of the KJCW license.

As a KTVQ satellite, the station's transmitter was co-located with KPRQ (88.1 FM) just off Red Grade Road southwest of Sheridan. KTVQ now operates a translator on channel 9 (K09XK-D) from the same site.
