= Dog Eat Dog =

Dog Eat Dog may refer to:

== Film and television ==
- Dog Eat Dog (1964 film), an Italian film
- Dog Eat Dog (2001 film), a UK film
- Dog Eat Dog (2008 film), a Colombian film by director Carlos Moreno
- Dog Eat Dog (2016 film), an American film by Paul Schrader
- Dog Eat Dog (2018 film), a Norwegian short film by Rikke Gregersen
- Dog Eat Dog Films, a production company operated by Michael Moore
- Dog Eat Dog (British game show), a British game show
- Dog Eat Dog (American game show), the American version of the UK show
- Dog Eat Dog (Australian game show), an Australian game show series based on the UK version
- Care pe care (loosely translated: Dog eat dog), a Romanian television program hosted by Leonard Miron

=== Television show episodes ===
- "Dog Eat Dog" (The Bill)
- "Dog Eat Dog" (CSI), an episode of the American crime drama CSI: Crime Scene Investigation
- "Dog Eat Dog" (Cashmere Mafia)
- "Dog Eat Dog" (The Gates)
- "Dog Eat Dog" (Picket Fences)
- "Dog Eat Dog" (Underbelly: The Golden Mile)
- "Dog Eat Dog", an episode of Street Hawk

== Music ==
- Dog Eat Dog (band), an American hardcore punk group

=== Albums ===
- Dog Eat Dog (Joni Mitchell album) or the title song, 1985
- Dog Eat Dog (Warrant album), 1992

=== Songs ===
- "Dog Eat Dog" (AC/DC song), 1977
- "Dog Eat Dog" (Adam and the Ants song), 1980
- "Dog Eat Dog" (Ted Nugent song), 1976
- "Dog Eat Dog", by De La Soul from Stakes Is High, 1996
- "Dog Eat Dog", by Hocico, 2010
- "Dog Eat Dog", by "Weird Al" Yankovic from Polka Party!, 1986
- "Dog Eats Dog", from the musical Les Misérables, 1980

== Literature ==
- Dog Eat Dog, a 2004 novel by Niq Mhlongo
- Dog Eat Dog, a novel by Edward Bunker
- Dog Eat Dog, a novel by David J. Rodger

== Games ==
- Dog Eat Dog (role-playing game), a tabletop role-playing game about colonialism
- Dog Eat Dog, an unreleased game by computer-game developer Trilobyte
- Canis Canem Edit (Latin: Dog eat dog), the title of the 2006 video game Bully in the PAL region

== See also ==
- Dog eat Doug, a comic strip
