= DED =

Ded or DED may refer to:

== Biology ==
- Death effector domain, a signalling pathway in cell biology
- Diabetic eye disease, also known as diabetic retinopathy
- Dutch elm disease, a disease of elm trees

== Entertainment ==
- Ded (band), an American nu metal band from Tempe, Arizona
- Diyar-e-Dil, a Pakistani television series

== Government ==
- Deferred Enforced Departure, an immigration status in the U.S. similar to Temporary Protected Status
- Department of Economic Development (disambiguation)
- Deutscher Entwicklungsdienst, German Development Service
- District electoral divisions, in Ireland, since 1996 termed electoral divisions

== Places ==
- DeLand Municipal Airport (FAA location identifier DED), in DeLand, Florida, United States
- Jolly Grant Airport (IATA code DED), serving Dehradun, Uttarakhand, India

== Sports ==
- Dead End Derby, a roller derby league in Christchurch, New Zealand
- DED Basketball Club, a Dutch basketball club
- Digitally enhanced dasherboard, a means of virtual advertising for ice hockey television broadcasts

== Technology ==
- Data element definition, associated with a data element within a data dictionary
- Dedicated hosting service, a type of Internet hosting
- Directed energy deposition, an ASTM International-defined additive manufacturing process
- Disjunctive embedded dependency a type of constraint on a relational database
- Dragging equipment detector, a type of defect detector used on railroads

== Other ==
- Ded (bishop of Vác), Hungarian 12th-century prelate
- Dedua language, spoken in Papua New Guinea
- Doctor of Education (D.Ed.)
- Dog Eat Dog (disambiguation)
- Dog eat Doug, an American comic strip
- Double-ended dildo

== See also ==
- Dead (disambiguation)
