= Bardic lamp =

Safety lamp used on the UK rail network

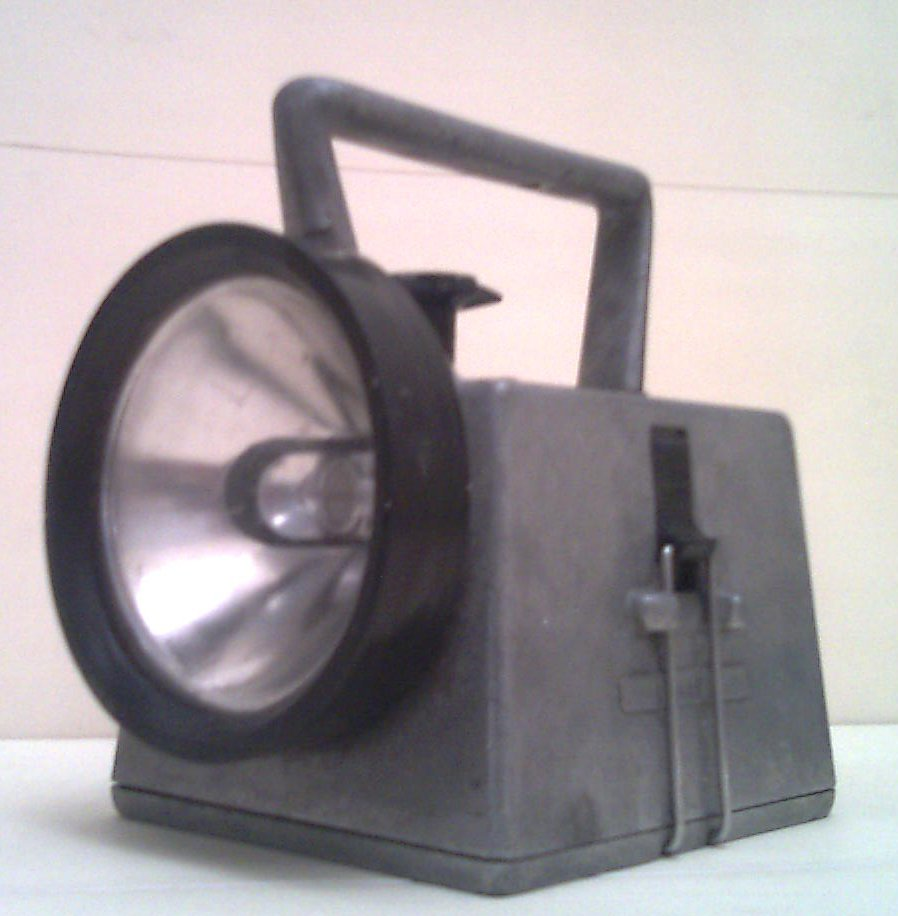
A British Rail Bardic hand-lamp

The Bardic Rail Signalling Lamp was the original name of a particular type of battery powered railway signalling handlamp made from 1962 by Bardic, Ltd. for use by rail and trackside workers. Around 1965, British Rail made an initial order of 42,500 Bardic lamps to replace the older paraffin-lit handlamps in use across the railway network. In 1966, the design was patented in the United Kingdom, Spain and France. Today, the term ‘Bardic’ has become a common term in the UK for almost any battery operated handlamp used for hand-signalling.

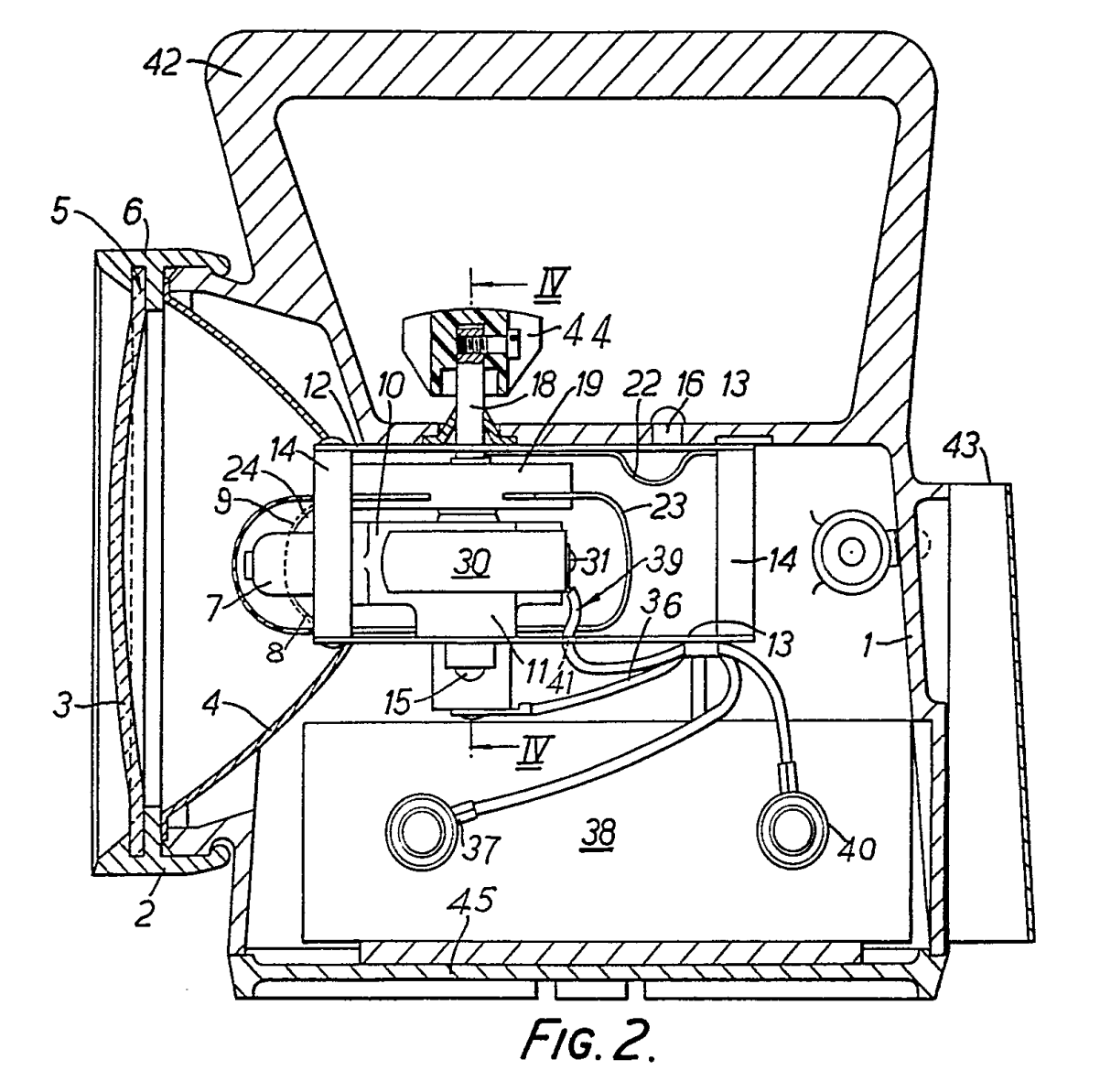
Diagram showing a profile view of the internals of a bardic railway handlamp. Note the mounting bracket on the right side labelled '43'.

Most Bardic lamps allowed red, green, yellow and white lights to be shown for hand-signalling purposes, although some were not equipped with a yellow aspect. Due to their size and solid metal construction, bardic lamps were sometimes used by traincrews as makeshift self-defence weapons. Bardic lamps were fitted with a bracket at the back which allowed them to be used as headlamps or tail lamps in an emergency.

Bardic lamps are still in use today on the British national network and on heritage railways, although newer versions have been developed and smaller pocket torches have become common for handsignalling by traincrew and platform staff. Network Rail have now approved a smaller, more convenient lamp that uses super bright LEDs. The trade name Bardic has been owned by Honeywell since 2004, when they took over Novar plc.

The lamps were used on the London Underground network until they were phased out in the years 2000–2001.

The lamps were also used by the British Army, the National Coal Board and other public services, with special airtight versions being developed for use in gaseous conditions. The lamps were used by police services as emergency warning lights at the scene of traffic collisions.

A version of the bardic lamp was developed as a portable emergency light. It would sit on a static base and charge from mains electricity while not in use and was locked in position to prevent theft. In the event of a power failure, the locking device was automatically released and the fully-charged device could be used for portable lighting.
