= Hot Wheel =

Hot Wheel may refer to:

- Hot Wheel Roller Derby, a league based in Leeds in England
- Hot Wheels, a brand of toy car
- Hot wheel defect detector, a railway sensor designed to detect sticking brakes
