= Ministry of Economic Development =

Ministry of Economic Development may refer to:

== Ministries ==
- Ministry of Economic Development, Tourism, Trade and Enterprise (Albania)
- Ministry of Economic Development (Azerbaijan)
- Ministry of Economic Development (Bashkortostan)
- Three Canadian provincial ministries:
  - Ministry of Industry, Economic Development and Mines (Manitoba)
  - Ministry of Economic Development, Employment and Infrastructure, in Ontario
  - Ministry of Economic Development, Innovation and Export Trade, in Quebec
- Ministry of Economic Development (Colombia)
- Ministry of Finance and Economic Development (Ethiopia)
- Ministry of Economy and Sustainable Development (Georgia)
- Federal Ministry of Economic Cooperation and Development, in Germany
- Ministry of Economic Development (Italy)
- Ministry of Economic Development, Transport and Trade, in Maldives
- Ministry of Finance and Economic Development (Mauritius)
- Ministry of Economic Development (New Zealand)
- Ministry of Economic Development (Russia)
- Ministry of Economic Development (Sri Lanka)
- Ministry of Finance, Planning and Economic Development (Uganda)
- Ministry of Economic Development and Trade (Ukraine)

== Ministers ==
- Minister of Economic Development and Official Languages, in Canada
- Minister of Economic Development (Isle of Man)
- Minister of Economic Development (New Zealand)
- Minister of Economic Development (South Africa)

== See also ==
- Department of Economic Development (disambiguation)
