= Caboose =

Crew car on the end of trains

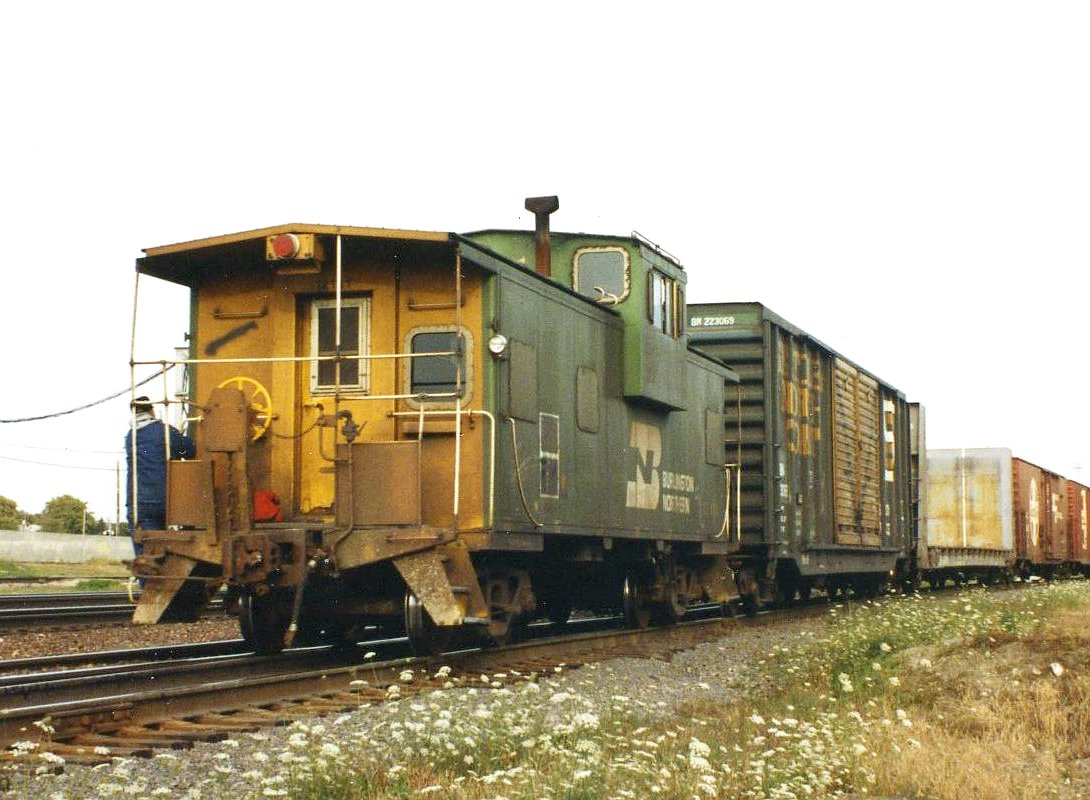
A Burlington Northern extended-vision caboose at the end of a train in 1993

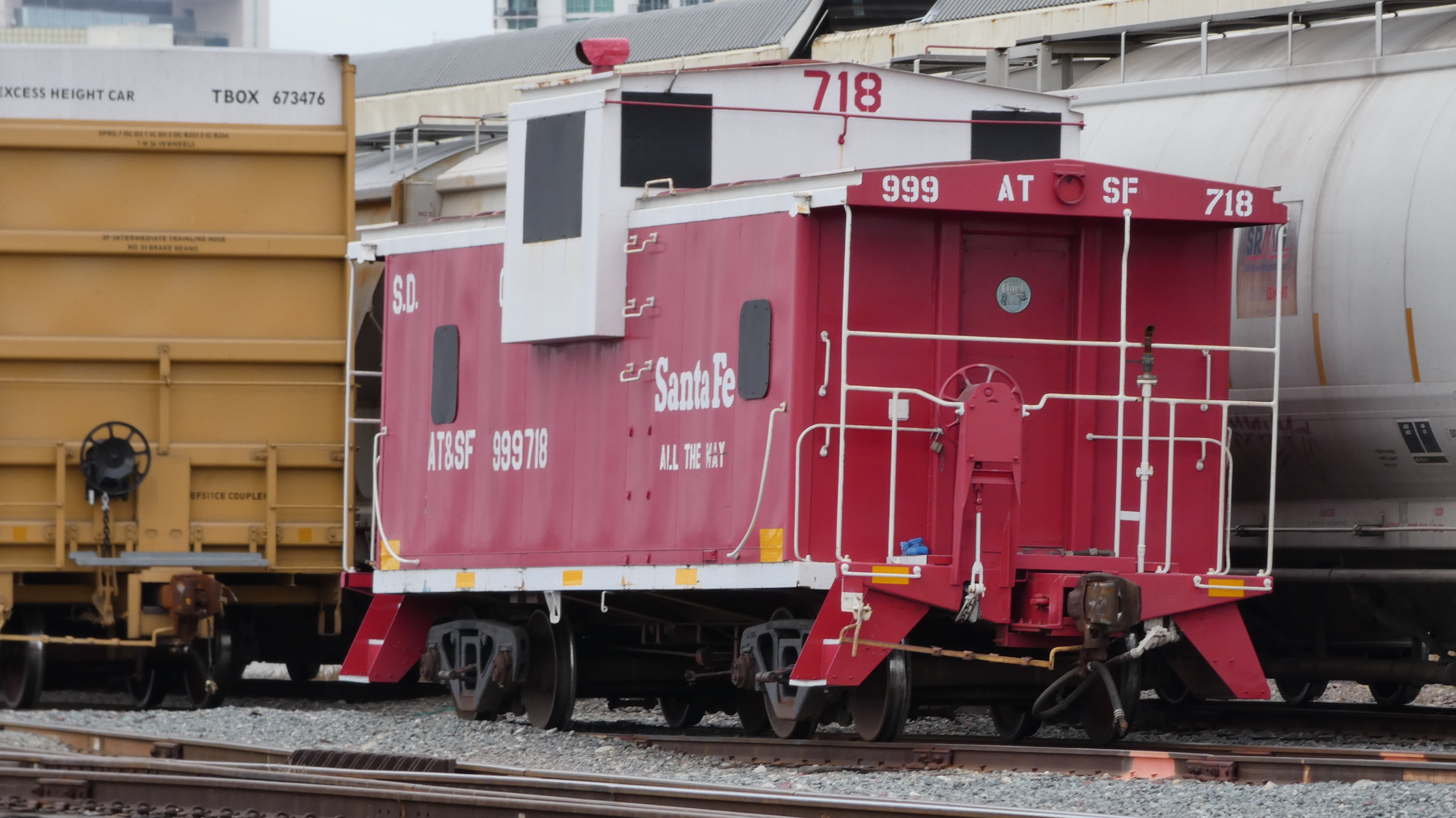
An ex–Santa Fe Railway caboose used by BNSF Railway as a switching platform

A caboose is a crewed North American railroad car coupled at the end of a freight train. Cabooses provide shelter for crew (conductor and flagman) at the end of a train, who were formerly required for rear-end protection in non-signaled territory, switching and shunting; as well as in keeping a lookout for load shifting, damage to equipment and cargo, and overheating axles.

Originally flatcars fitted with cabins or modified box cars, they later became purpose built, with bay windows to the sides of the car, or cupolas above the roof, to allow crew to observe the train. The caboose also served as the conductor's office, and on long routes, included sleeping accommodations and cooking facilities.

A similar railroad car, the brake van, was used on British and Commonwealth railways outside North America (the role has since been replaced by the crew car in Australia). On trains not fitted with continuous brakes, brake vans provided a supplementary braking system, and they helped keep chain couplings taut.

Cabooses were used on every freight train in the United States and Canada until the 1980s, when safety laws requiring the presence of cabooses and full crews were relaxed. A major purpose of the caboose was for observing problems at the rear of the train before they caused trouble. Lineside defect detectors and end-of-train devices eliminated much of this need. Older freight cars had plain bearings with hot boxes for crews to spot overheating – as freight cars replaced these with roller bearings, there was also less need for cabooses to monitor them. Nowadays, they are generally only used on rail maintenance or hazardous materials trains, as a platform for crew on industrial spur lines when it is required to make long reverse movements, or on heritage and tourist railroads.

== Etymology ==
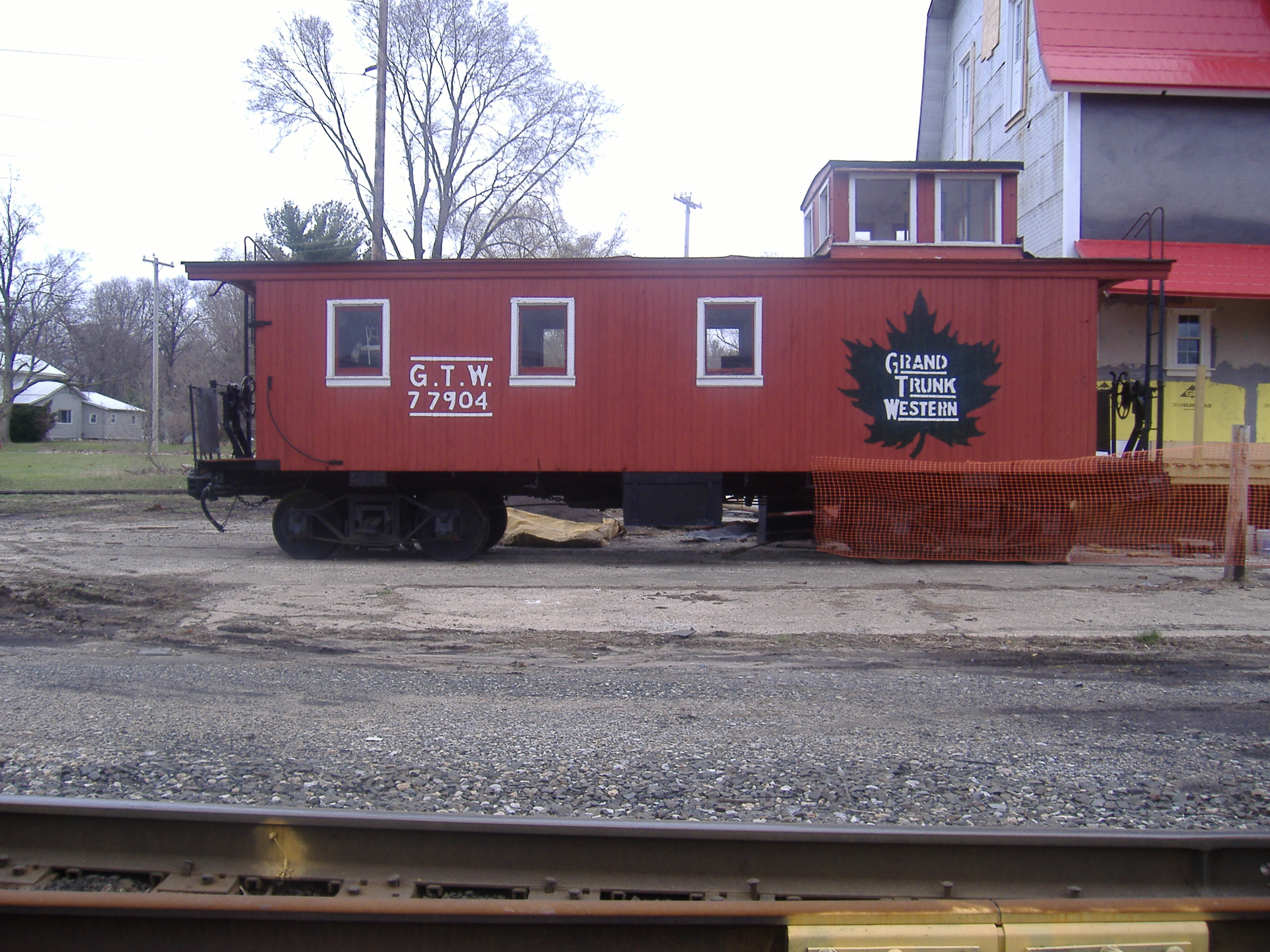
A retired wooden Grand Trunk Western Railroad caboose

Railroad historian David L. Joslyn (a retired Southern Pacific Railroad draftsman) has traced the possible root of "caboose" to the obsolete Middle Low German word Kabuse, a small cabin erected on a sailing ship's main deck. This was absorbed into Middle Dutch and entered the Dutch language c. 1747 as kabhuis, the compartment on a ship's main deck in which meals were prepared. In modern Dutch, kombuis is equivalent to galley.

Eighteenth-century French naval records also make reference to a cambose or camboose, which described both the food preparation cabin on a ship's main deck and its stove. Camboose may have entered English through American sailors who had come into contact with their French allies during the American Revolution. It was already in use in U.S. naval terminology by the 1797 construction of the USS Constitution, whose wood-burning food preparation stove is known as the camboose. In modern French, cambuse can refer both to a ship's storeroom and to the North-American railcar.

Camboose as a cook shack was in use in English at least by 1805, when it was used in a New York Chronicle article cited in the New English Dictionary describing a New England shipwreck, which reported that "[Survivor] William Duncan drifted aboard the canboose [sic]." As the first railroad cabooses were wooden shanties erected on flat cars as early as the 1830s, they would have resembled the cook shack on a ship's deck.

The earliest known printed record of caboose used to describe the railcar appeared in 1859 in court records in conjunction with a lawsuit filed against the New York and Harlem Railway.

The most common pluralization of caboose is cabooses.

== History ==
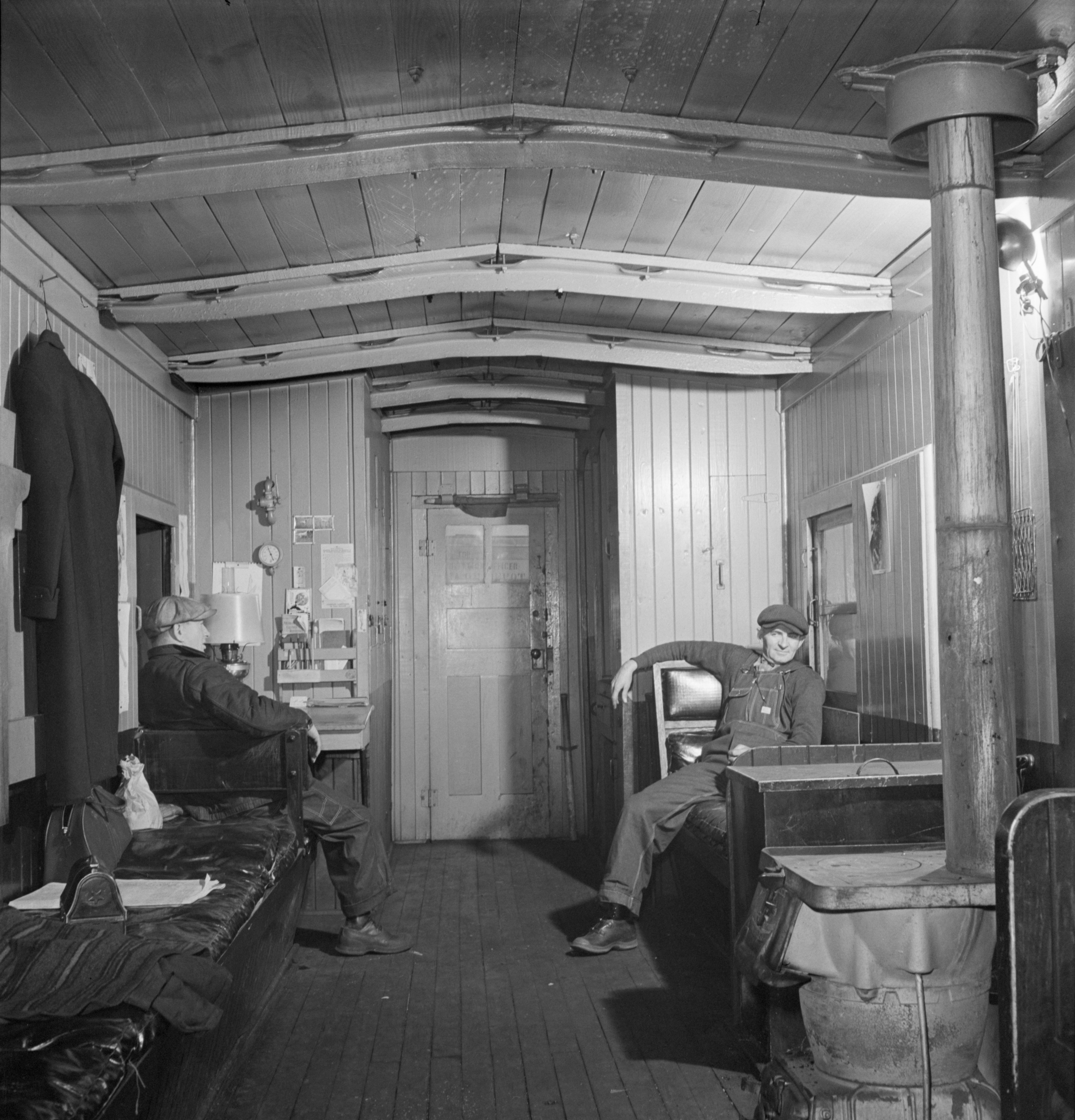
The interior of an Indiana Harbor Belt Railroad caboose in 1943

Use of cabooses began in the 1830s, when railroads housed trainmen in shanties built onto boxcars or flatcars. The caboose provided the train crew with a shelter at the rear of the train. The crew could exit the train for switching or to protect the rear of the train when stopped. They also inspected the train for problems such as shifting loads, broken or dragging equipment, and hot boxes (overheated axle bearings, a serious fire and derailment threat). The conductor kept records and handled business from a table or desk in the caboose. For longer trips, the caboose provided minimal living quarters, and was frequently personalized and decorated with pictures and posters.

Early cabooses were nothing more than flat cars with small cabins erected on them, or modified box cars. The standard form of the American caboose had a platform at either end with curved grab rails to facilitate train crew members' ascent onto a moving train. A caboose was fitted with red lights called markers to enable the rear of the train to be seen at night. This has led to the phrase "bringing up the markers" to describe the last car on a train. These lights were officially what made a train a "train", and were originally lit with oil lamps. With the advent of electricity, later caboose versions incorporated an electrical generator driven by belts coupled to one of the axles, which charged a lead-acid storage battery when the train was in motion. The addition of the cupola, a lookout post atop the car, was introduced in 1863.

Coal or wood was originally used to fire a cast-iron stove for heat and cooking, later giving way to a kerosene heater. Now rare, the old stoves can be identified by several essential features. They were without legs, bolted directly to the floor, and featured a lip on the top surface to keep pans and coffee pots from sliding off. They also had a double-latching door, to prevent accidental discharge of hot coals caused by the rocking motion of the caboose.

Cabooses are non-revenue equipment and were often improvised or retained well beyond the normal lifetime of a freight car. Tradition on many lines held that the caboose should be painted a bright red, though on many lines it eventually became the practice to paint them in the same corporate colors as locomotives. The Kansas City Southern Railway was unique in that it bought cabooses with a stainless steel car body, and so was not obliged to paint them.

=== Decline ===
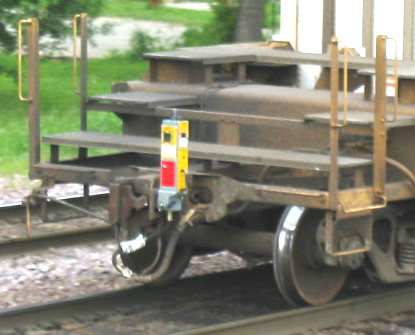
An end-of-train device on a train in 2005

Until the 1980s, laws in the United States and Canada required all freight trains to have a caboose and a full crew for safety. Technology eventually advanced to a point where the railroads, in an effort to save money by reducing crew members, stated that cabooses were unnecessary.

New diesel locomotives had large cabs that could house entire crews. Distant dispatchers controlled switches, eliminating the need to manually throw switches after trains had passed. Improved signaling eliminated the need to protect the rear of a stopped train. Bearings were improved and lineside detectors were used to detect hot boxes, which themselves were becoming rarer with more and more freight cars gaining roller bearings. Better-designed cars avoided problems with the loads which helped as well. The railroads also claimed a caboose was a dangerous place, as slack run-ins could hurl the crew from their places and even dislodge weighty equipment.

Railroads proposed the end-of-train device (EOT or ETD), commonly called a FRED (flashing rear-end device), as an alternative. An ETD could be attached to the rear of the train to detect the train's air brake pressure and report any problems to the locomotive by telemetry. The ETD also detects movement of the train upon start-up and radios this information to the engineers so they know all of the slack is out of the couplings and additional power could be applied. The machines also have blinking red lights to warn following trains that a train is ahead. With the introduction of the ETD, the conductor moved up to the front of the train with the engineer.

A 1982 Presidential Emergency Board convened under the Railway Labor Act directed United States railroads to begin eliminating caboose cars where possible to do so. A legal exception was the state of Virginia, which had a 1911 law mandating cabooses on the ends of trains, until the law's final repeal in 1988. With this exception aside, year by year, cabooses started to fade away. Very few cabooses remain in operation today, though they are still used for some local trains where it is convenient to have a brakeman at the end of the train to operate switches, on long reverse movements, and are also used on trains carrying hazardous materials. The Connecticut Southern Railroad and Housatonic Railroad continued using cabooses on some trains as late as 1998 to allow for long reverse movements to be made safely.

CSX Transportation is one of the few Class 1 railroads that still maintains a fleet of modified cabooses for regular use. Employed as "shoving platforms" at the rear of local freight trains which must perform long reverse moves or heavy switching, these are generally rebuilt bay-window cabooses with their cabin doors welded shut (leaving their crews to work from the rear platform). BNSF also maintains a fleet of former wide-vision cabooses for a similar purpose, and in 2013 began repainting some of them in heritage paint schemes of BNSF's predecessor railroads.

With the retirement of cabooses by most railroads, a number were purchased by private owners, with most intended for static display. Many uses have been found for retired cabooses, including restaurants, cabins, and residences.

== Types ==
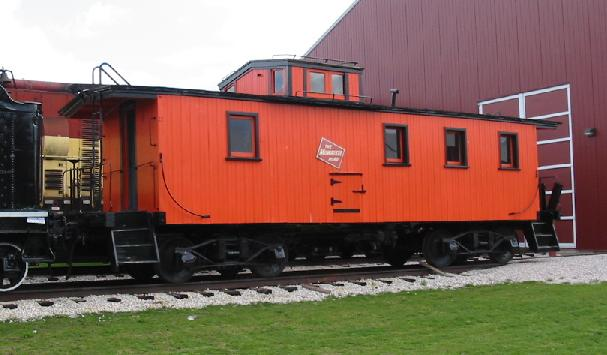
A Milwaukee Road cupola caboose at the US National Railroad Museum

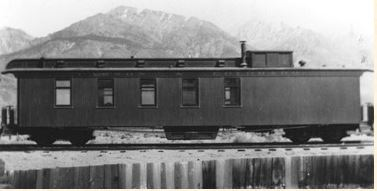
Carson & Colorado RR No. 10 was a unique car: a narrow-gauge combination caboose and business car. It is now in the collection of the Southern California Railway Museum.

The form of cabooses varied over the years, with changes made both to reflect differences in service and improvements in design. The most commonly seen types are:

=== Cupola or "standard" ===
The most common caboose form in American railroad practice has a small windowed projection on the roof, called the cupola. The crew sat in elevated seats to inspect the train from this perch.

The invention of the cupola caboose is generally attributed to T. B. Watson, a freight conductor on the Chicago and North Western Railway. In 1898, he wrote:

During the '60s I was a conductor on the C&NW. One day late in the summer of 1863 I received orders to give my caboose to the conductor of a construction train and take an empty boxcar to use as a caboose. This car happened to have a hole in the roof about two feet square. I stacked the lamp and tool boxes under the perforation end and sat with my head and shoulders above the roof ... (Later) I suggested putting a box around the hole with glass in, so I could have a pilot house to sit in and watch the train.

The position of the cupola varied. In most eastern railroad cabooses, the cupola was in the center of the car, but most western railroads preferred to put it toward the end of the car. Some conductors preferred to have the cupola toward the front, others liked it toward the rear of the train, and still others had no preference. ATSF conductors could refuse to be assigned to a train if they did not have their cabooses turned to face the way they preferred. This would be a rare union agreement clause that could be used however it was not a regular issue.

The classic idea of the "little red caboose" at the end of every train came about when cabooses were painted a reddish brown; however, some railroads (Union Pacific and Nickel Plate Road, for example) painted their cabooses yellow or red and white. The most notable was the Santa Fe which in the 1960s started a rebuild program for their cabooses in which the cars were painted bright red, with an eight-foot-diameter Santa Fe cross herald emblazoned on each side in yellow. Some railroads, chiefly the Wabash Railway, Pennsylvania Railroad, Norfolk and Western and Illinois Central Gulf, also built or upgraded cabooses with streamlined cupolas for better aerodynamics and to project a more modern image.

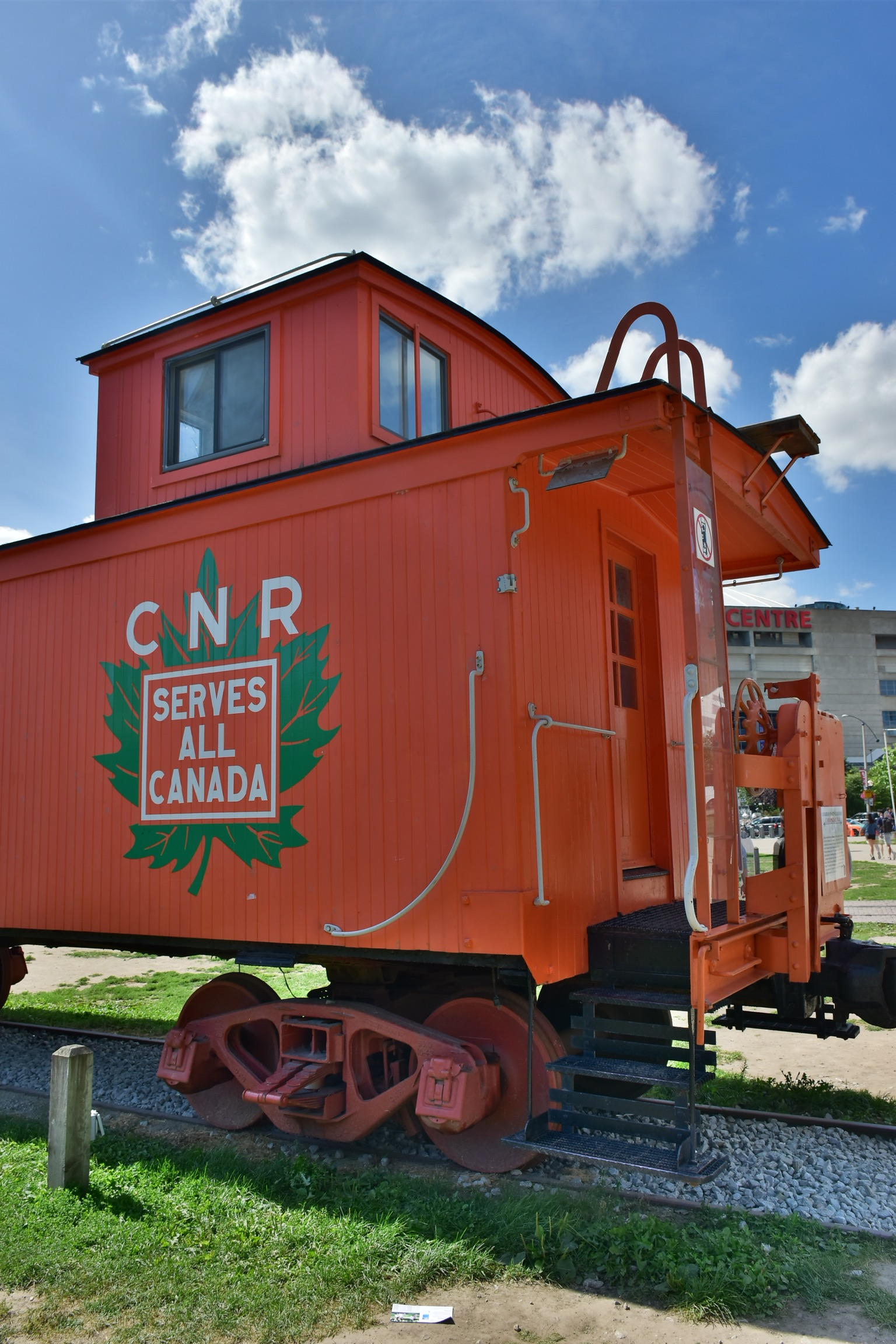
The cupola section (vertical projection with window) on a restored caboose on exhibit at the Toronto Railway Museum

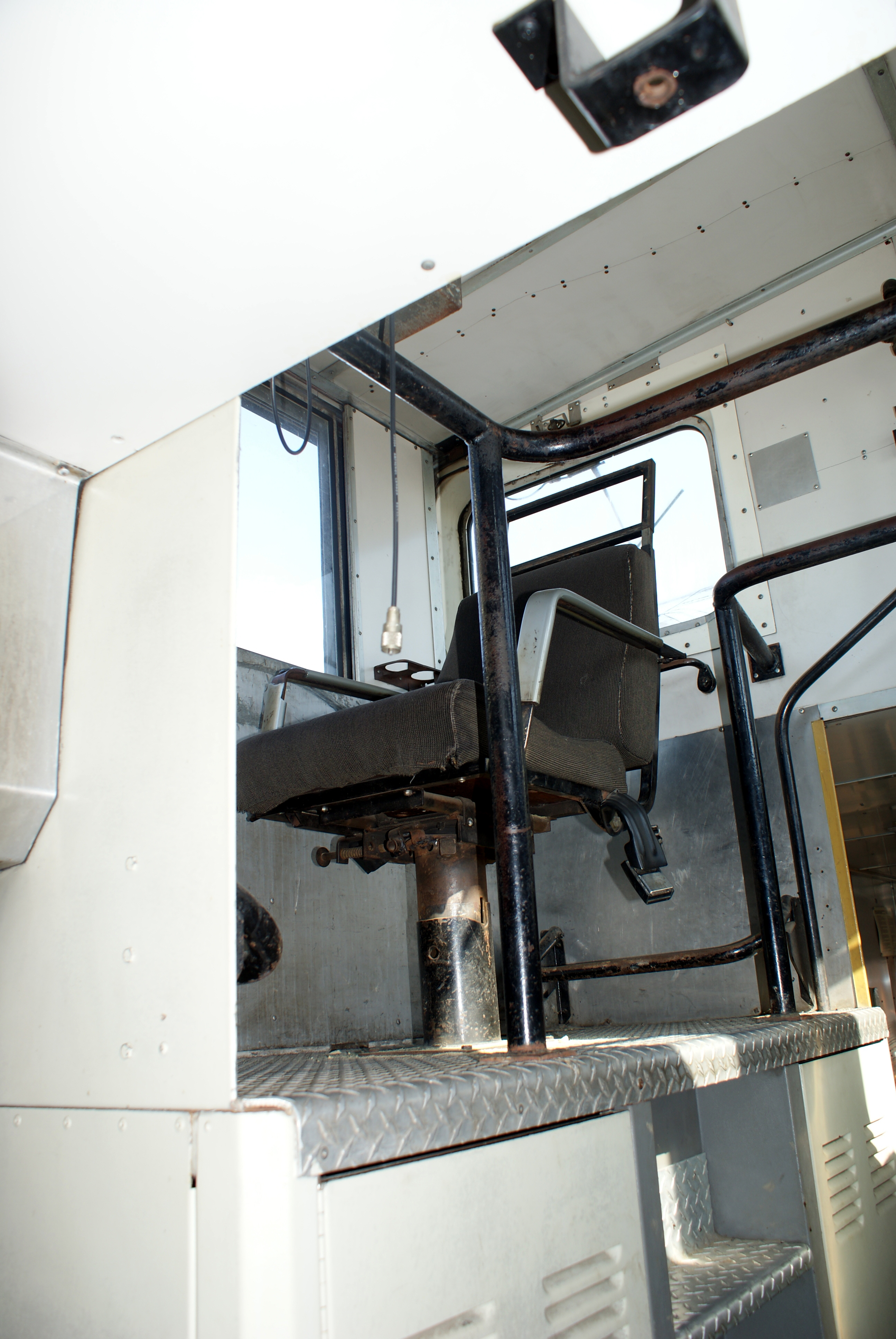
Seating area in a cupola caboose

=== Bay window ===
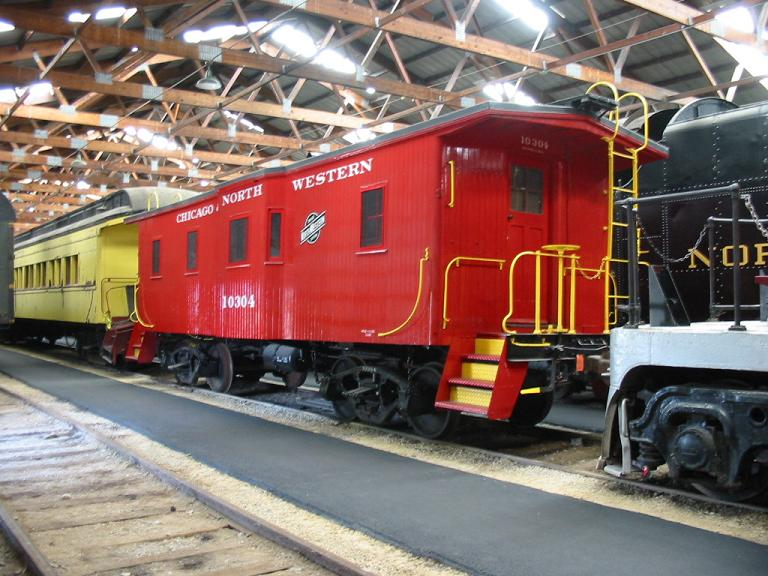
A former Chicago & Northwestern Railway bay window caboose at the Illinois Railway Museum

In a bay window caboose, the crew monitoring the train sits in the middle of the car in a section of wall that projects from the side of the caboose. The windows set into these extended walls resemble architectural bay windows, so the caboose type is called a bay window caboose. This type afforded a better view of the side of the train and eliminated the falling hazard of the cupola. It is thought to have first been used on the Akron, Canton and Youngstown Railroad in 1923, but is particularly associated with the Baltimore and Ohio Railroad, which built all of its cabooses in this design starting from an experimental model in 1930. The bay window gained favor with many railroads because it eliminated the need for additional clearances in tunnels and overpasses.

On the West Coast, the Milwaukee Road and the Northern Pacific Railway used these cars, converting over 900 roof top cabooses to bay windows in the late 1930s. Milwaukee Road rib-side bay window cabooses are preserved at New Lisbon, Wisconsin, the Illinois Railway Museum, the Mt. Rainier Scenic Railroad and Cedarburg, Wisconsin, among other places.

The Western Pacific Railroad was an early adopter of the type, building their own bay window cars starting in 1942 and acquiring this style exclusively from then on. Many other roads operated this type, including the Southern Pacific Railroad, St. Louis – San Francisco Railway, Missouri-Kansas-Texas Railroad, Kansas City Southern Railway, the Southern Railway, and the New York Central Railroad.

In the UK, brake vans are usually of this basic design: the bay window is known as a lookout or ducket.

=== Extended-vision ===
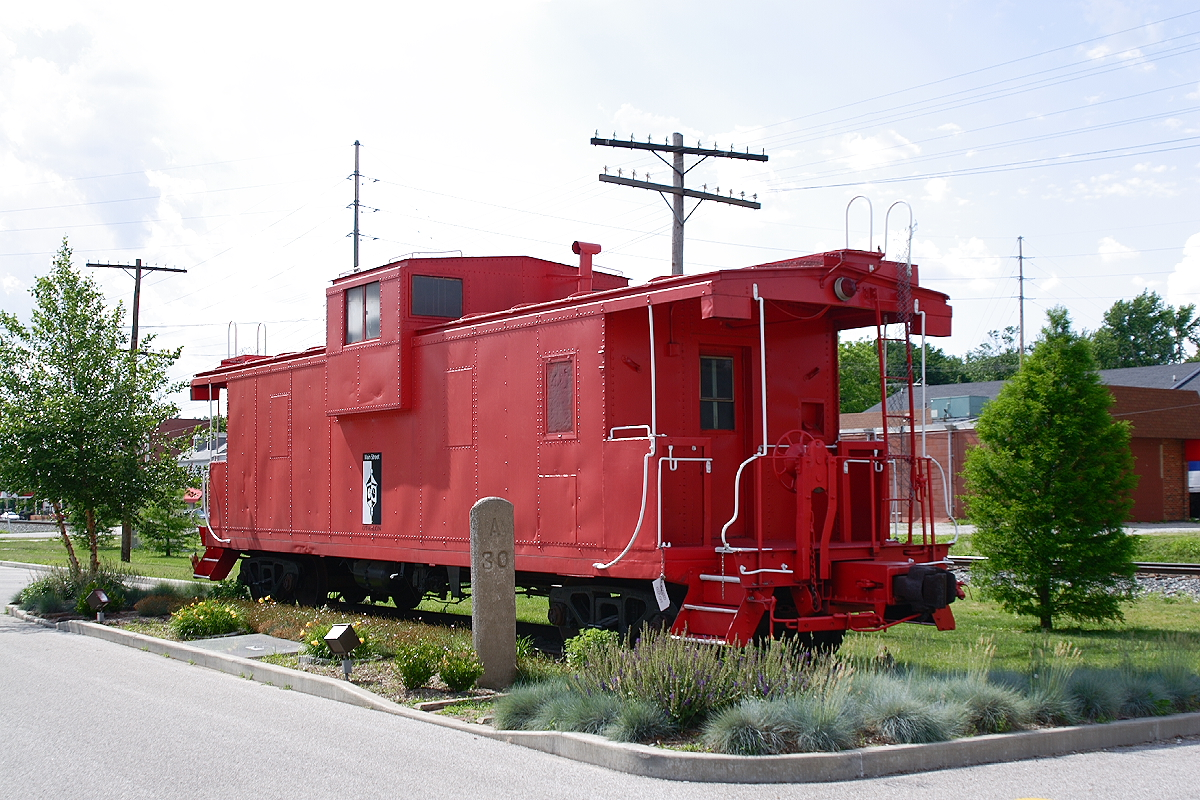
An extended-vision caboose on static display in O'Fallon, Illinois

In the extended-vision or wide-vision caboose, the sides of the cupola project beyond the side of the car body. Rock Island created some of these by rebuilding some standard cupola cabooses with windowed extensions applied to the sides of the cupola itself, but by far, the greatest number have the entire cupola compartment enlarged. This model was introduced by the International Car Company and saw service on most U.S. railroads. The expanded cupola allowed the crew to see past the top of the taller cars that began to appear after World War II, and also increased the roominess of the cupola area.

Additionally, Monon Railroad had a unique change to the extended-vision cabooses. They added a miniature bay to the sides of the cupola to enhance the views further. This created a unique look for their small fleet. Seven of the eight Monon-built cabooses have been saved. One was scrapped after an accident in Kentucky. The surviving cars are at the Indiana Transportation Museum (operational), the Indiana Railway Museum (operational), the Kentucky Railway Museum (fire damaged), and the Bluegrass Railroad Museum (unrestored but serviceable). The remaining three are in private collections.

=== Transfer ===
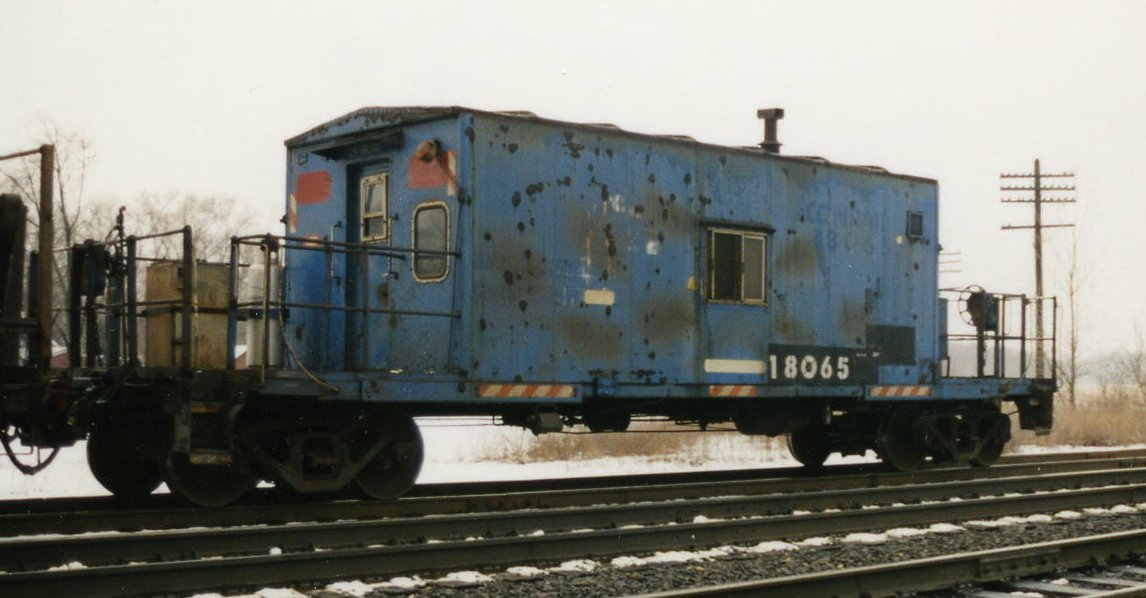
A Conrail transfer caboose

A transfer caboose looks more like a flat car with a shed bolted to the middle of it than like a standard caboose. It is used in transfer service between rail yards or short switching runs, and as such, lacks sleeping, cooking or restroom facilities. The ends of a transfer caboose are left open, with safety railings surrounding the area between the crew compartment and the end of the car.

A recent variation on the transfer caboose is the "pushing" or "shoving" platform. It can be any railcar where a brakeman can safely ride for some distance to help the engineer with visibility at the other end of the train. Flatcars and covered hoppers have been used for this purpose, but often the pushing platform is a caboose that has had its windows covered and welded shut and permanently locked doors. CSX uses former Louisville & Nashville short bay window cabooses and former Conrail waycars as pushing platforms.

=== Drover's ===
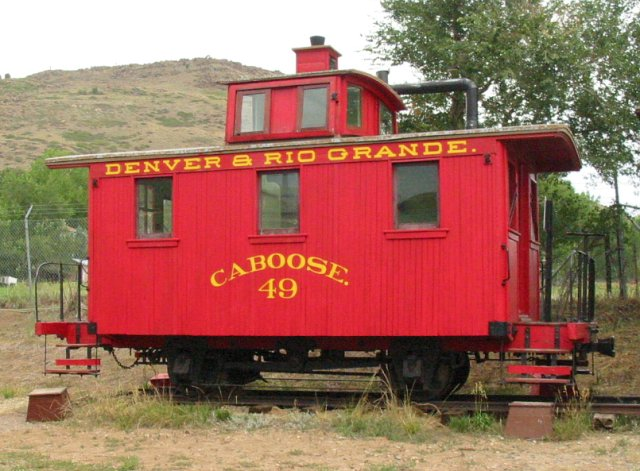
A two-axled "bobber" cupola caboose at the Colorado Railroad Museum, known for the uneven ride its lack of trucks created

Drover's cabooses looked more like combine cars than standard cabooses. The purpose of a drover's caboose was much more like a combine, as well. On longer livestock trains in the American West, the drover's caboose is where the livestock's handlers would ride between the ranch and processing plant. The train crew rode in the caboose section while the livestock handlers rode in the coach section. Drover's cabooses used either cupolas or bay windows in the caboose section for the train crew to monitor the train. The use of drover's cars on the Northern Pacific Railway, for example, lasted until the Burlington Northern Railroad merger of 1970. They were often found on stock trains originating in Montana.

== Preservation and reuse ==
Although the caboose has largely fallen out of use, some are still retained by railroads in a reserve capacity. These cabooses are typically used in and around railyards. Other uses for the caboose include "special" trains, where the train is involved in some sort of railway maintenance; as part of survey trains that inspect remote rail lines after natural disasters to check for damage; or in protecting the movement of nuclear material within the United States. Others have been modified for use in research roles to investigate complaints from residents or business owners regarding trains in certain locations. Finally, some are coupled to trains for special events, including historical tours.

The Chihuahua al Pacífico Railroad in Mexico still uses cabooses to accompany their motorail trains between Chihuahua and Los Mochis.

Cabooses have also become popular for collection by railroad museums and for city parks and other civic uses, such as visitor centers. The author of a book on cabooses estimated approximately 4,600 cabooses were preserved in the United States in some capacity in 1998. Several railroad museums roster large numbers of cabooses, including the Illinois Railway Museum with 19 examples and the Western Pacific Railroad Museum at Portola, California, with 17. Many shortline railroads still use cabooses today. Large railroads also use cabooses as "shoving platforms" or in switching service where it is convenient to have crew at the rear of the train.

Cabooses have been reused as vacation cottages, garden offices in private residences, and as portions of restaurants. Also, caboose motels have appeared, with the old cars being used as cabins.

A bay window caboose numbered FCD-17 is still being used by the Philippine National Railways for non-revenue maintenance trains. It was built in Japan in 1962 and is used as an inspection car by the Philippine National Police.

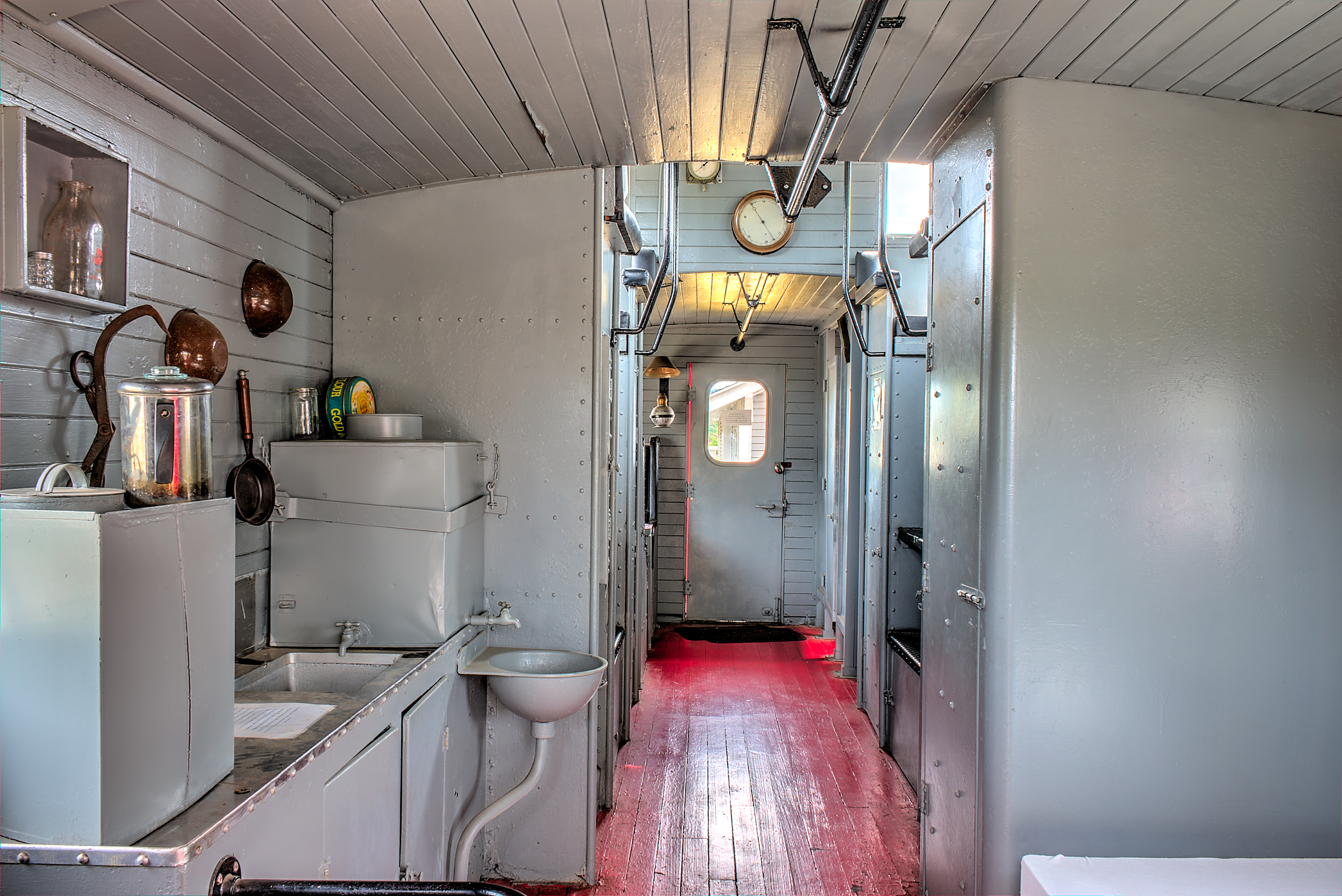
Interior of Virginian Railway Caboose #308 at the Princeton Railroad Museum in Princeton, West Virginia

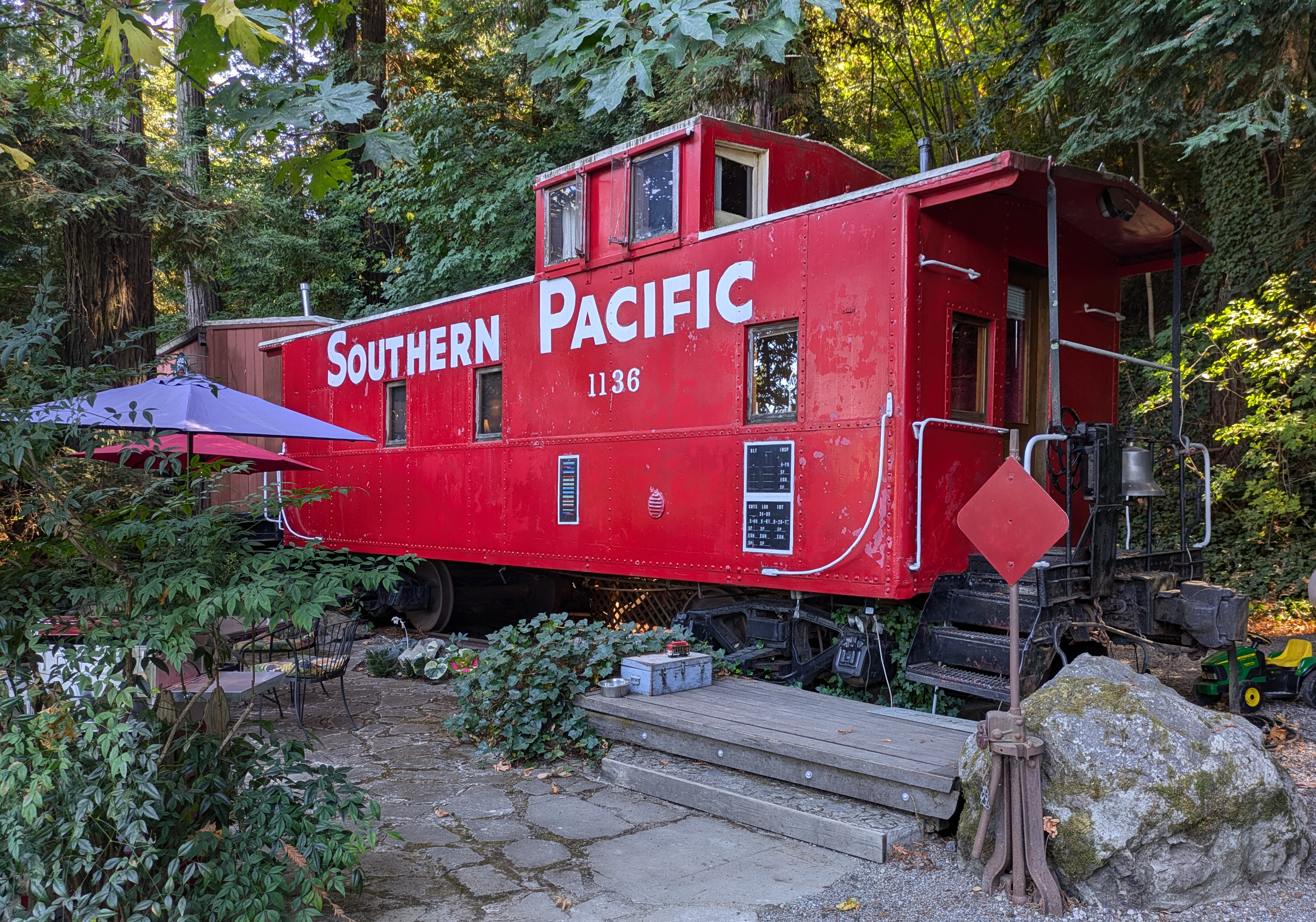
A former caboose converted into a vacation cottage

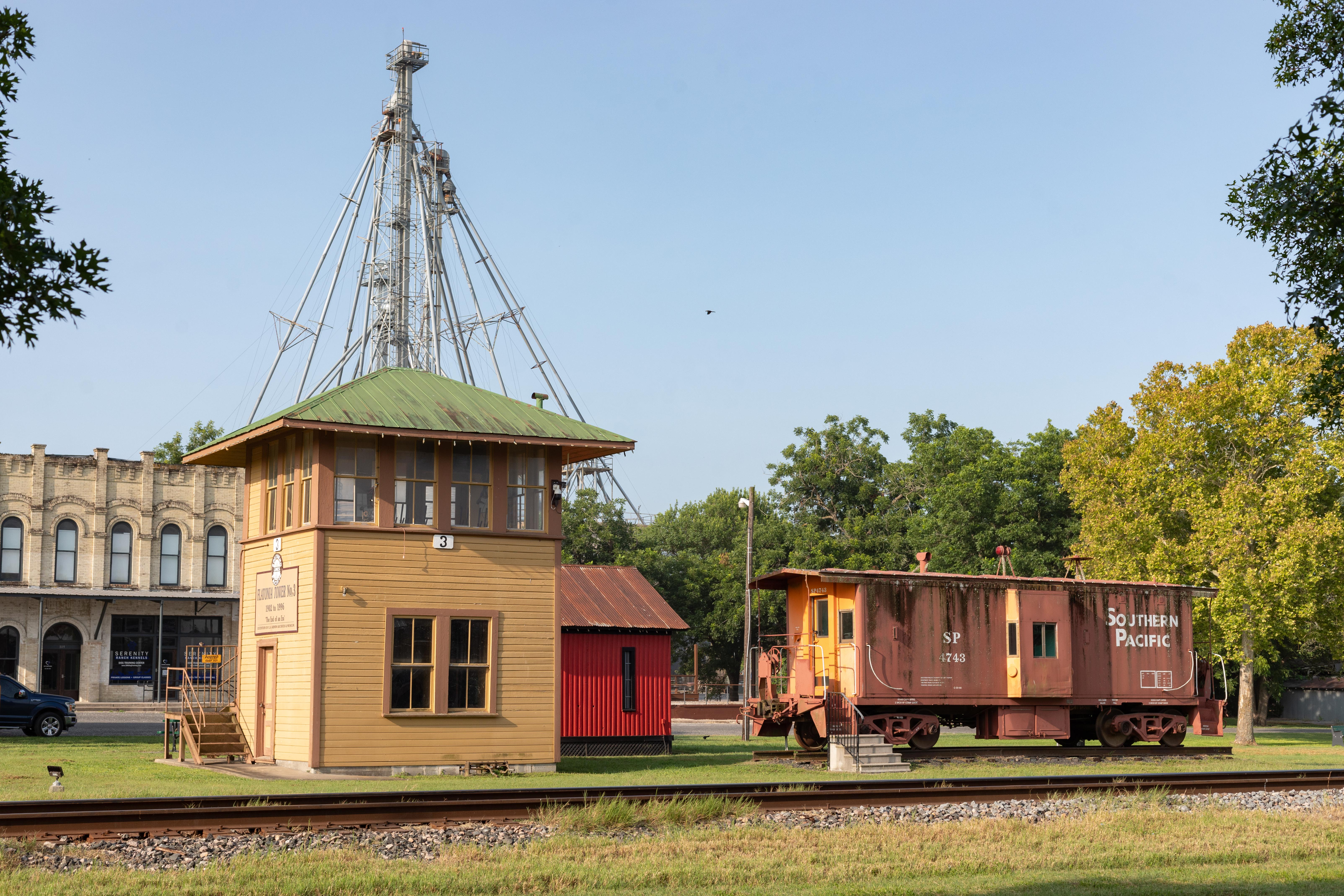
A caboose on display with an interlocking tower in Flatonia, Texas. Many small towns received donations of cabooses for display following their phase out in the 1980s.

== See also ==
- Brakeman's cabin
- Brake van
- Crew car
- End-of-train device
- Caboose (ship's galley)
