= Dog Eat Dog (American game show) =

American game show

- Genre: Game show
- Based on: Dog Eat Dog by: Howard Davidson; Sarah Edwards; Gail Sloan; Lynn Sutcliffe
- Developed by: David Young
- Written by: David Eilenburg; Alex Chauvin; Ann Slichter
- Directed by: Bob Levy
- Presented by: Brooke Burns
- Theme music composer: Russ Landau
- Country of origin: United States
- Original language: English
- No. of seasons: 2
- No. of episodes: 26

Production
- Executive producers: Matt Kunitz; Stuart Krasnow; Colin Jarvis; Kym Langer
- Producers: Mark Keizer; Christopher Lore; Ted Smith; Sandra Soczka; Tracy Santomarco; Brooke Burns
- Production locations: NBC Studios; Burbank, California
- Editor: Ari Macht
- Running time: 45–48 minutes
- Production companies: BBC Worldwide; NBC Studios

Original release
- Network: NBC
- Release: June 17, 2002 – August 26, 2003

Related
- Dog Eat Dog (British version)

Dog Eat Dog is an American game show, which originally ran from June 17, 2002, to August 26, 2003. It was based on the British version of the show by the same name. It was hosted by Brooke Burns, and had contestants compete against each other in physical competitions, trivia, and other assorted games for a prize of $25,000.

== Gameplay ==
=== Main game ===
Six players spend a day together at a training camp before arriving at the studio for the show. A challenge is described, and the players each vote for the one they want to send into it. The player receiving the most votes takes the challenge. Failure to complete it sends the player to the "Dog Pound" and eliminates him/her from play, while completing it allows the player to send one of the people who voted for him/her to the "Dog Pound."

Four challenges are played in this manner. If a tie vote occurs on the first one, a player is chosen at random to break it; on all subsequent challenges, the last player eliminated acts as the tiebreaker. The last two players compete in a fifth, head-to-head challenge, with the winner being officially declared that night's "Top Dog" and the loser going to the "Dog Pound.”

=== Final round ===
The previously determined "Top Dog" faces the five members of the "Dog Pound." A category is shown, and the Top Dog chooses a member of the Dog Pound who they think cannot answer a question in that category. Each contestant can be chosen only once. If the Dog Pound member answers correctly, the Dog Pound scores a point; if not, the Top Dog scores a point. The first side to score three points wins the game and $25,000 (the five Dog Pound members receiving a divided $5,000 each if they win).

=== Stunts ===
Some of the one-player stunts featured on various versions of the show were:

| Stunt | Definition |
|---|---|
| Catwalk (season 1)/Runway (season 2) | While in six-inch heels, the contestant has to walk down a balance beam suspended above a water tank in order to retrieve a purse at the end while walking back with that said purse without falling off. There was no time limit and they only had two attempts to do it. |
| Celebrity Three-Way | A Celebrity Name version of "Before & After" from Wheel of Fortune - a contestant must find the common name shared by two celebrities. (ex: Matt "Damon" Wayans) |
| Mutant Celebrity | The contestant must identify famous celebrities from their distorted photographs. Before the challenge, Burns would show a distorted picture of herself as an example. |
| Ladder Wheel | Crawl around a circular ladder hanging in the air in a limited amount of time of two minutes and capture the flag. |
| Earthquake Island | Climb up a ladder mounted on a tilting island with rain in a limited time of two minutes or two-and-a-half minutes. |
| Flag Capture | Climb a net and get the greatest number of flags in a limited amount of time of two minutes or two-and-a-half minutes. |
| He or She | Given a panel of about six subjects, guess which one was the female (or male) out of the group. This normally involved having five cross-dressing men and one female, with the contestant having to guess which one of them was the female. |
| Little Genius | Play a trivia game against a child prodigy. |
| Strip Games | The contestant was required to perform a feat of skill of some sort, every time the player made a mistake, he or she was required to remove one article of clothing. If the feat was accomplished before the player missed the attempt completely naked, the mission was completed. Some of the stripping stunts included throwing a beanbag or a football into a target, making a hole-in-one on a golf hole (with each removed article of clothing allowing the player to move closer to the hole), darts (where the contestant had to forfeit an article of clothing in exchange for a dart), and hangman (with each missed letter costing an article of clothing). The strip games were discontinued in the second season. |
| Water Walk | Walk on a platform while being hit by water. The contestant has to release 2 red flags and make it back to the start before the time expires. |
| Out on a Limb | Player is enclosed in a large, X-Shaped figure, in which he or she must collect 4 red flags and 4 blue flags within the time limit of 90 seconds from Season 1, Episode 2 or two minutes, completing all of one color first, followed by the other. |
| Treadmill Trivia | Walk/run on a treadmill trying to answer ten questions right before falling off the treadmill from fatigue and into a giant swimming pool. Every time a question is answered wrong, the speed on the treadmill increases. A variation of this game was used in which the contestant was required to walk/run on a large wheel, which arbitrarily sped up throughout the round. |
| Tear Factor | The contestant has 90 seconds to cry based on thoughts and/or what the members in the Dog Pound are saying. At least one tear must clear their face for them to win. The name of this stunt was a parody of the hit reality show Fear Factor. |
| Pandora's Box | Grab floating water markers and bring them to a box submerged underwater with a limited time of two minutes. |
| Vomit Comet | The contestant is placed in a contraption that spins them around while the crane it is attached to is also spinning 360 degrees. Brooke reads various names of places or titles, and the contestant has to state the exact number of vowels in the name. The contestant has 90 seconds to give 8 correct answers to win. |
| Pendulum Swing | The contestant is placed inside a swing and has to gain enough momentum to maneuver the cage one full circle with a limited time of two minutes. Failure to complete the full circle lands the contestant in the dog pound. This is one of the challenges that carried over from the UK version. |

Some of the head-to-head competitions included:

| Competition | Description |
|---|---|
| Fish Throwing | Used only once, two professional fish throwers threw fish at each of the 2 contestants. After two minutes, whoever caught the most won. |
| Hanging in the Rain | The remaining two contestants hang on a bar with just their hands in pouring rain, the first to fall loses. |
| Rainstorm Pedestal | Contestants stand on a small pedestal mounted atop a long pole in the pool; the first person to fall off the pedestal loses. After five minutes, the rain machines are turned on, if both contestants last ten minutes, the intensity of the rain is increased. Starting in the second season, the rain begins after two minutes. |
| Wall Climbing | Contestants would climb up a wall holding a key which they would use to unlock a box at the top. They would jump down and take a second key to the top and put it in the keyhole they had previously unlocked. The first person to do this would dump 400 gallons of water on to the other person, and would send the other person to the dog pound. |
| Upside down Trapeze | Used only once, two players hang upside down on trapeze bars, the first person to fall in the pool loses. If both contestants are there after one minute, it starts to rain. After two minutes, another surprise will occur to the players (the trapeze bars will slightly drop) and the intensity of the rain will increase. |
| Paddle Wheel | Both contestants must run on a paddle wheel above the pool, and the wheel will get faster as they go. The first one to fall out loses. |
| Pool Tile Trivia | Brooke asks both contestants a trivia question, they must find the answer on the tiles in the pool. Whoever comes up with a tile of the correct answer first get a point. First to three points is the winner. |

== Controversy ==
In the show's first episode, a contestant named Darin Goka had to be hospitalized after falling unconscious during a challenge where he had to hold his breath underwater. The contestant sued NBC, claiming that the mechanism failed and caused him brain damage. This also resulted in only four members participating in the final challenge; these four failed to win the money.
