= Dog Eat Dog (Australian game show) =

Australian TV game show

- Genre: Game show
- Based on: Dog Eat Dog by: Howard Davidson; Sarah Edwards; Gail Sloan; Lynn Sutcliffe
- Presented by: Simone Kessell
- Theme music composer: Paul Farrer
- Country of origin: Australia
- Original language: English
- No. of seasons: 1
- No. of episodes: 10

Production
- Running time: 60 minutes
- Production companies: BBC Worldwide; 7 Productions

Original release
- Network: Seven Network
- Release: 2002 – 2003

Dog Eat Dog is an Australian game show series based on the UK version aired on the Seven Network in 2002 until 2003. It was hosted by Simone Kessell. Ten episodes were filmed, but only two episodes were aired before it was taken off air, to be shown as during summer 2002–03.

== Gameplay ==
Six contestants use the knowledge they gained from each other prior to filming to nominate each other to complete a challenge in the studio.
