= Department of Economic Development =

Department of Economic Development may refer to:

- Department of Economic Development (New Brunswick), Canada
- Department of Economic Development (Dubai)
- Department of Economic Development (Isle of Man)
- Department of Economic Development (South Africa)
- Georgia Department of Economic Development, U.S.

== See also ==
- Ministry of Economic Development (disambiguation)
- Department of Economic Development, Tourism and the Arts, Tasmania
- Department of Economic Development, Jobs, Transport and Resources, Victoria, Australia
