= Dog Eat Dog (British game show) =

2001 British game show

- Genre: Game show
- Created by: Howard Davidson; Sarah Edwards; Gail Sloan; Lynn Sutcliffe
- Presented by: Ulrika Jonsson
- Narrated by: Dave Bussey (Series 2); Mark Chapman (Series 3–4)
- Theme music composer: Paul Farrer
- Country of origin: United Kingdom
- Original language: English
- No. of series: 4
- No. of episodes: 31

Production
- Running time: 45 minutes (Series 1); 35 minutes (Series 2–4)
- Production company: BBC Television

Original release
- Network: BBC One
- Release: 14 April 2001 – 6 August 2003

Dog Eat Dog is a British game show that was hosted by Ulrika Jonsson and aired from 14 April 2001 to 6 August 2003 on BBC One.

== Format ==
The programme started off by showing the six contestants at a training day where they underwent various tests to assess their strengths and weaknesses. The contestants talked about themselves and their fellow competitors. In the studio, the contestants voted on who they thought would fail a given challenge, which would either be a mental or physical one. The contestant who received the most votes would have to attempt the challenge. If they failed, they went to the "Loser's Bench", and if they won, they got to choose who went to that area of the studio, before reentering the game. They could only choose someone who voted for them to do the challenge.

In the case of a tied ballot; the person who was sent to the Loser's Bench at the end of the previous challenge gets the tie break vote, and chooses between the tied contestants. If the tied vote happens on the opening round, then a contestant is selected at random; and that person gets to vote between the tied players. A player may not vote for themselves, unless they are the random tie-breaker in a tie and are part of that tie.

The last remaining contestant had the chance of winning the £10,000 prize, but had to face a general knowledge round against the other five competitors. If they could predict which three would get their questions wrong, they won the money; however, if the losers got three of their questions right, they split the prize between them, i.e. £2,000 each, and the overall winner of the show went home with nothing.

Some of the physical challenges carried over to the American version and the format was licensed internationally by BBC Worldwide, the commercial arm of the BBC.

== Transmissions ==
| Series | Start date | End date | Episodes |
|---|---|---|---|
| 1 | 14 April 2001 | 2 June 2001 | 8 |
| 2 | 8 September 2001 | 20 October 2001 | 7 |
| 3 | 26 January 2002 | 23 March 2002 | 8 |
| 4 | 14 September 2002 | 2 November 2002 | 8 |
| 4 | 6 August 2003 | | 8 |

== International versions ==
| Country | Local name | Host | Network | Aired | Top Prize |
|---|---|---|---|---|---|
| Australia | Dog Eat Dog | Simone Kessell | Seven Network | 2002–2003 | $50,000 |
| Dubai | Unknown | | Dubai TV | 2004 | Dhs 50,000 |
| Germany | Auge um Auge | Kai Böcking | ZDF | 2002 | €20,000 |
| Poland | Oko za oko | Jarosław Ostaszkiewicz | TVN | 2002 | zł 25,000 |
| Singapore | Show Me Your Power | Guo Liang | Channel U | 2003 | S$10,000 |
| United States | Dog Eat Dog | Brooke Burns | NBC | 2002–2003 | $25,000 |
