= End-of-train device =

Safety device mounted to rear of a train

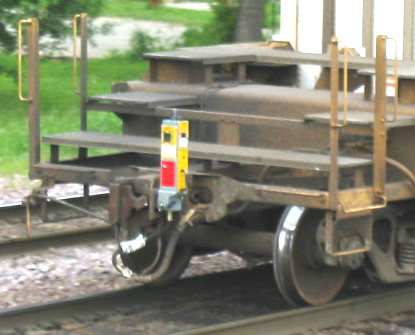
An ETD on a container train in 2005

The end of train device (ETD), sometimes referred to as an EOT, flashing rear-end device (FRED) or sense and braking unit (SBU) is an electronic device mounted on the end of freight trains in replacement of a caboose. They are divided into three categories: "dumb" units, which only provide a visible indication of the rear of the train with a flashing red taillight; "average intelligence" units with a brake pipe pressure gauge; and "smart" units, which send back data to the crew in the locomotive via radio-based telemetry. They originated in North America, and are also used elsewhere in the world, where they may include complete End of Train Air System (ETAS) or Sense and Brake Unit (SBU) devices.

== Tail lamps ==
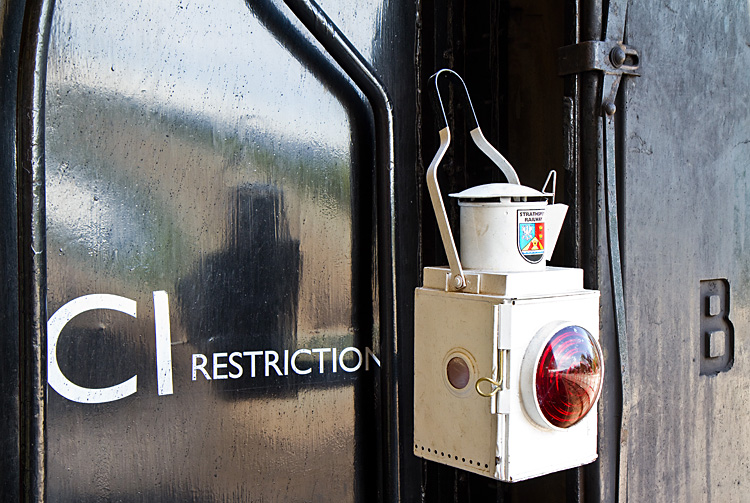
A tail lamp on the last carriage of a train, showing that the train is complete

The earliest known method of showing the position of and completeness of a train was by the Stockton and Darlington Railway in the 1830s, where a burning brazier was attached to the rear of trains.

Under the absolute block system, each train must carry a tail lamp with a red lens on the rear. The purpose of the tail lamp is to show the signaller that the train has not separated in the previous block section, and it guarantees that the train is complete. Trains not fitted with a continuous brake were also required to carry side lamps on the rearmost vehicle; these lamps pointed forwards and showed a white light. Side lamps showed the driver of the train that their train was complete and had not separated.

== End of train devices ==
=== Design and use ===
A "dumb" ETD can be as simple as a red flag attached to the coupler on the last car of the train, whereas "smart" devices monitor functions such as brake line pressure and accidental separation of the train using a motion sensor, functions that were previously monitored by a crew in the caboose. The ETD transmits data via a telemetry link to the Head-of-Train Device (HTD) in the locomotive, known colloquially among railroaders as a "Wilma," after cartoon character Wilma Flintstone. In Canada, this device is known as a sense and braking unit (SBU).

A typical HTD contains several lights indicating telemetry status and rear end movement, along with a digital readout of the brake line pressure from the ETD. It also contains a toggle switch used to initiate an emergency brake application from the rear end. In modern locomotives, the HTD is built into the locomotive's computer system, and the information is displayed on the engineer's computer screen.

Railroads have strict government-approved air brake testing procedures for various circumstances when assembling trains or switching out cars en route. After a cut is made between cars in a train and the train is rejoined, in addition to other tests, the crew must verify that the brakes apply and release on the rear car (to ensure that all of the brake hoses are connected and the angle cocks, or valves, are opened). In most cases, the engineer is able to use information from the ETD to verify that the air pressure reduces and increases at the rear of the train accordingly, indicating proper brake pipe continuity. This device is said to constitute a fail-safe condition.

The DPS ETD reduced labor costs, as well as the costs of the purchase and upkeep of cabooses. The Brotherhood of Conductors and Brotherhood of Railroad Brakemen were also greatly affected by ETD, as this electronic unit replaced two crewmen per train. The widespread use of ETDs has made the caboose nearly obsolete. Some roads still use cabooses where the train must be backed up, on short local runs, as rolling offices, or railroad police stations and as transportation for right-of-way maintenance crews. In some cases (see photo) instead of hitching a caboose, an employee stands on the last car when the train is backing up.

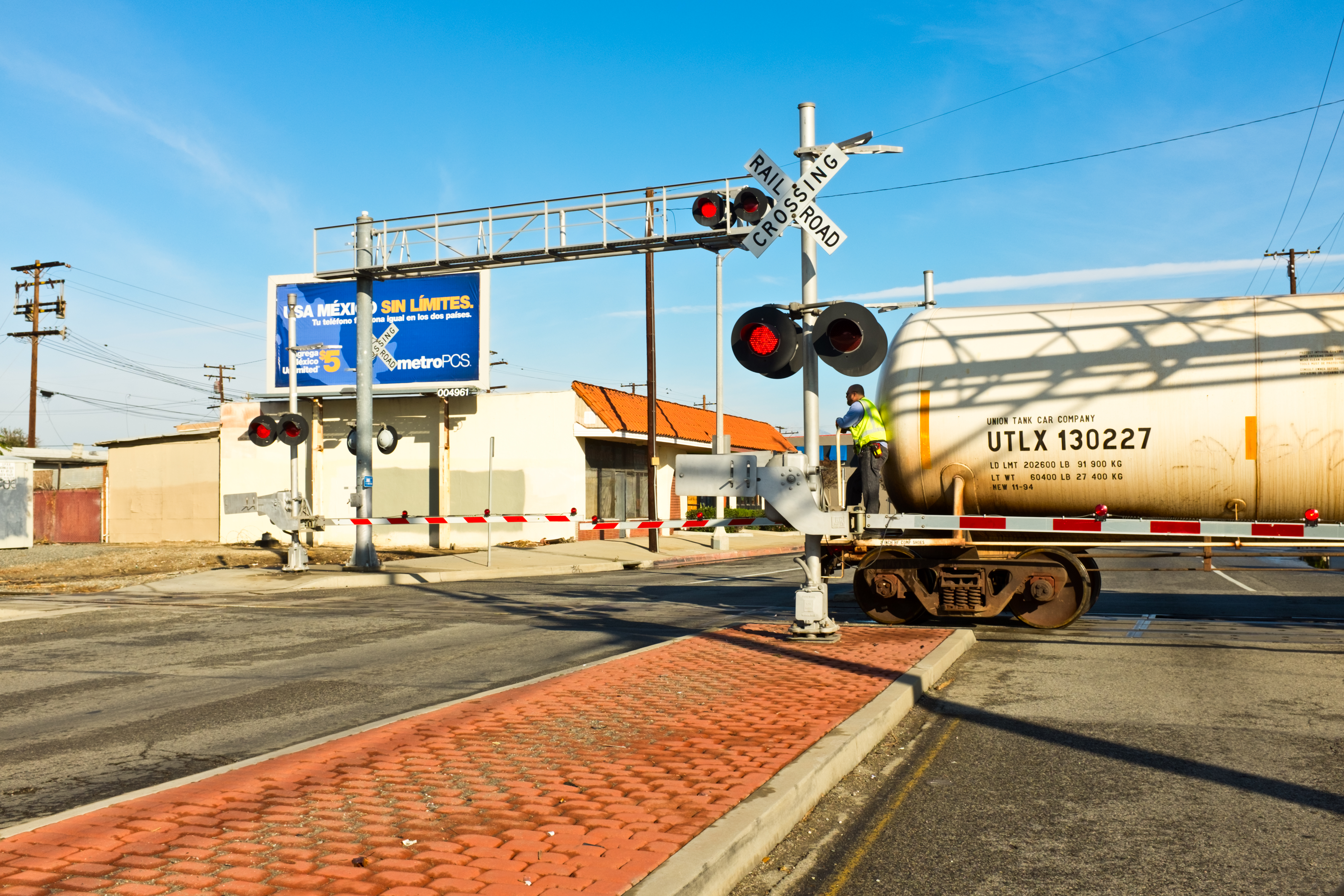
Because there is no caboose, the employee must stand on the last car of this Union Pacific train going in reverse, to make sure the track is clear; something the ETD cannot currently do.

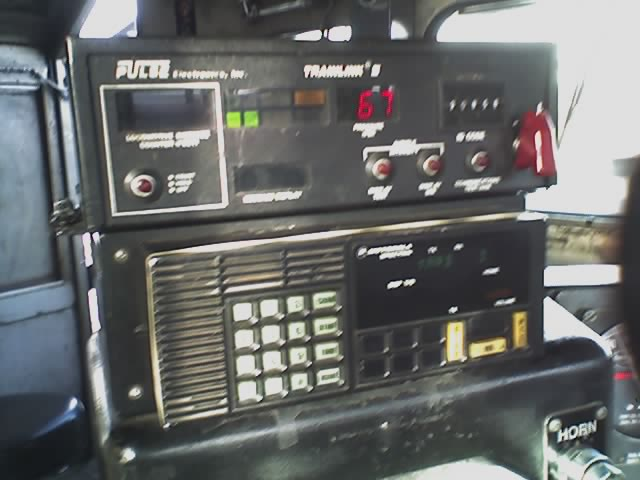
A typical "Wilma", head-of-train (HOT) device (HTD), displaying the current brake line pressure on the rear end (top unit).

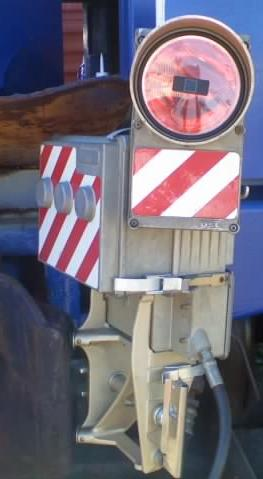
An end of train device

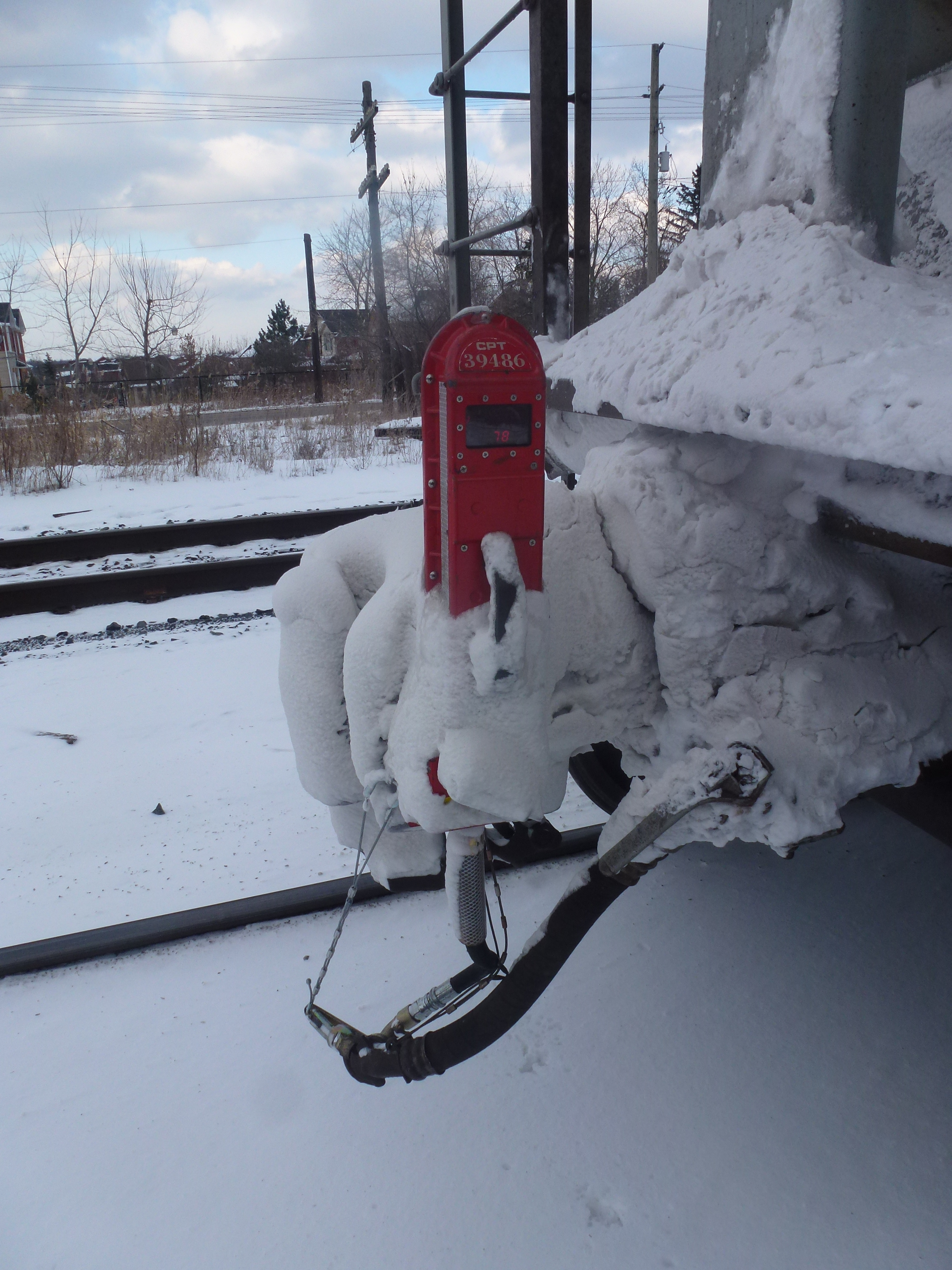
End-of-train devices must be made to withstand all kinds of weather. This one, attached to a covered hopper at the end of a long Canadian Pacific train, is still working even in the freezing winter cold.

=== Evolution ===
The first ETD use is attributed to Florida East Coast Railway in 1968, soon after which other Class I railroads began using ETDs as well. By the mid-1980s they were common equipment. Early models were little more than a brake line connection / termination, a battery and flashing tail light. As their use became more widespread through the 1980s, ETDs were equipped with radio telemetry transmitters to send brake pressure data to a receiver in the locomotive. To reduce the cost of battery replacements, ambient light sensors were added so the flashing light on the ETD would illuminate only during dusk and after dark. Later models have a small turbine-powered electrical generator using air pressure from the brake line to power the ETD's radio and sensors.

The one-way communication of brake data from the ETD to the locomotive evolved into two-way communication that enables the engineer to apply the brakes from both ends of the train simultaneously in an emergency. This is useful in the event that a blockage (or an unopened valve) in the train's brake line is preventing dumping the air pressure and causing all of the brakes in the train going into an emergency application. Such a situation could be dangerous, as stopping distance increases with fewer functioning brakes. Dumping the brake line pressure from both the front and rear of the train simultaneously ensures that the entire train applies all of its brakes in emergency. Other electronics within the ETD were also enhanced, and many now include GPS receivers as well as the two-way radio communications.

== Last vehicle board ==
Last vehicle board, often abbreviated as LV board, is a signaling board used on trains in some countries.

=== In India ===
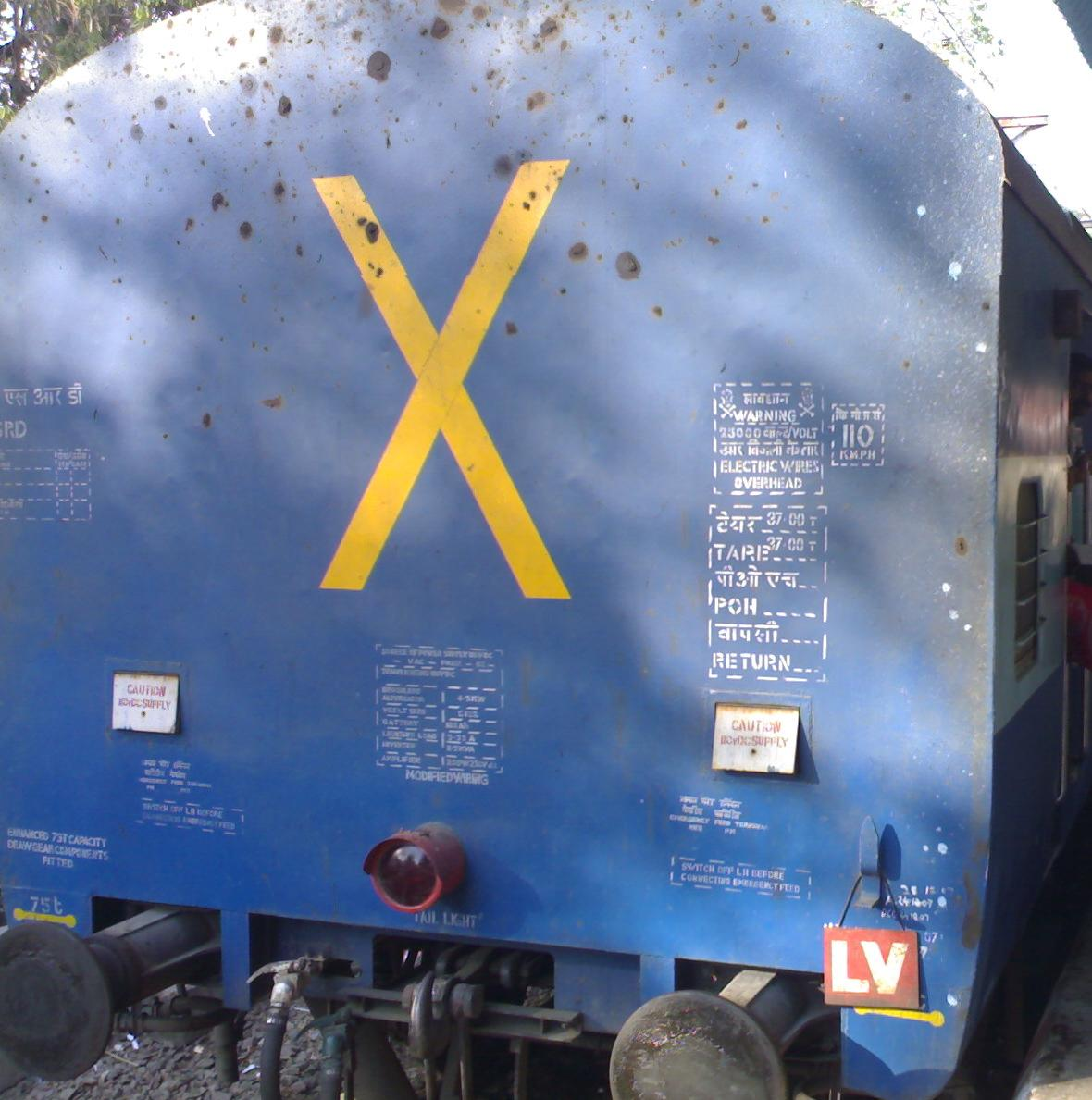
Last vehicle sign at the back of an Indian train

The last vehicle of a train is supposed to carry a red lamp at the rear. Earlier, the requirement was for merely an oil lamp, which was often missing or very feeble. In recent years provision of an electric lamp, as mandated by the rules, has become more common.

Last vehicle indications are of different types. A large 'X' is often seen painted on the rear of the coach that is the last one. A set of concentric circles may also be seen, although this seems to be going out of use as of 2008. EMU/DMU rakes have a smaller painted 'X' (red on white) at the rear, or sometimes a series of diagonal strokes painted on; these painted symbols are all in addition to the lamp mentioned above. In addition, a small board with the letters 'LV' (Last Vehicle, painted black on yellow) is often attached to the rear of the vehicle.

If a train passes by a station or signal cabin without the appropriate last vehicle indication (or without confirmation of the number of coaches or wagons), it is assumed that the train has separated and suitable emergency procedures are brought into play.

There are some cases where a last vehicle indication is not required — for instance, when the number of coaches or wagons in a train can be passed on to each block section after verification from the previous block section at the time the line clear indication is obtained (and with exchange of private numbers). The information is also provided to the section controllers. In some cases when working entirely within one block section, an 'LV' sign is not needed if the number of coaches or wagons is communicated by telephone to the next station.

=== In Sri Lanka ===
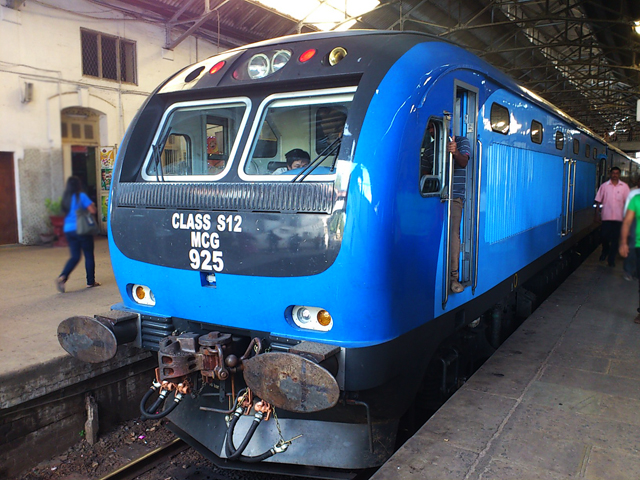
In Sri Lanka red lights of DMUs shows the back end.

The Last Vehicle (LV) board is also used by Sri Lanka Railways. This board is used for same purpose and is usually hung in a buffer of the last carriage. However, in DMUs, to indicate the last carriage (usually a driving/trailer car) red lights are used.

== See also ==
- Train lights
