= Dog Eat Dog (2018 film) =

- Directed by: Rikke Gregersen
- Written by: Rikke Gregersen
- Produced by: Rebekka Rognøy
- Starring: Renate Reinsve; André Sørum; Eili Harboe; Vebjørn Enger
- Edited by: Espen Skjong Knutsen
- Production companies: Westerdals Institute of Film and Media at Kristiania University College
- Distributed by: Salaud Morisset
- Release date: June 10, 2018
- Running time: 25 minutes
- Country: Norway

Dog Eat Dog (original title (NW): De Hensynsløse) is a Norwegian live action short film directed by Rikke Gregersen. The film received the Special Jury Prize at the 2019 BAFTA Student Film Awards and the silver medal in the Narrative International Category at the 46th Student Academy Awards.

== Plot ==
Silje wants to leave her boyfriend, but when she finds him in a half-hearted attempt to hang himself she has to reconsider, in fear of acting reckless.

== Awards ==
Year	Presenter/Festival	Award/Category	Status
2019	BAFTA Student Film Awards	"Special Jury Prize"	Won
2019	Student Academy Awards	"Silver Medal in the Narrative International Category"	Won
2019	Brussels Short Film Festival	"Best Short Film"	Nominated
2019	Norwegian Short Film Festival	"Best Short Film - honorable mention"	Won
2019	Raindance Film Festival	"Best Micro Budget Feature"	Nominated

The short was part of the Oscar predictive world touring screening The animation Showcase 2019 (Live Action Screenings).
