= Defect detector =

Device used to detect defects on trains

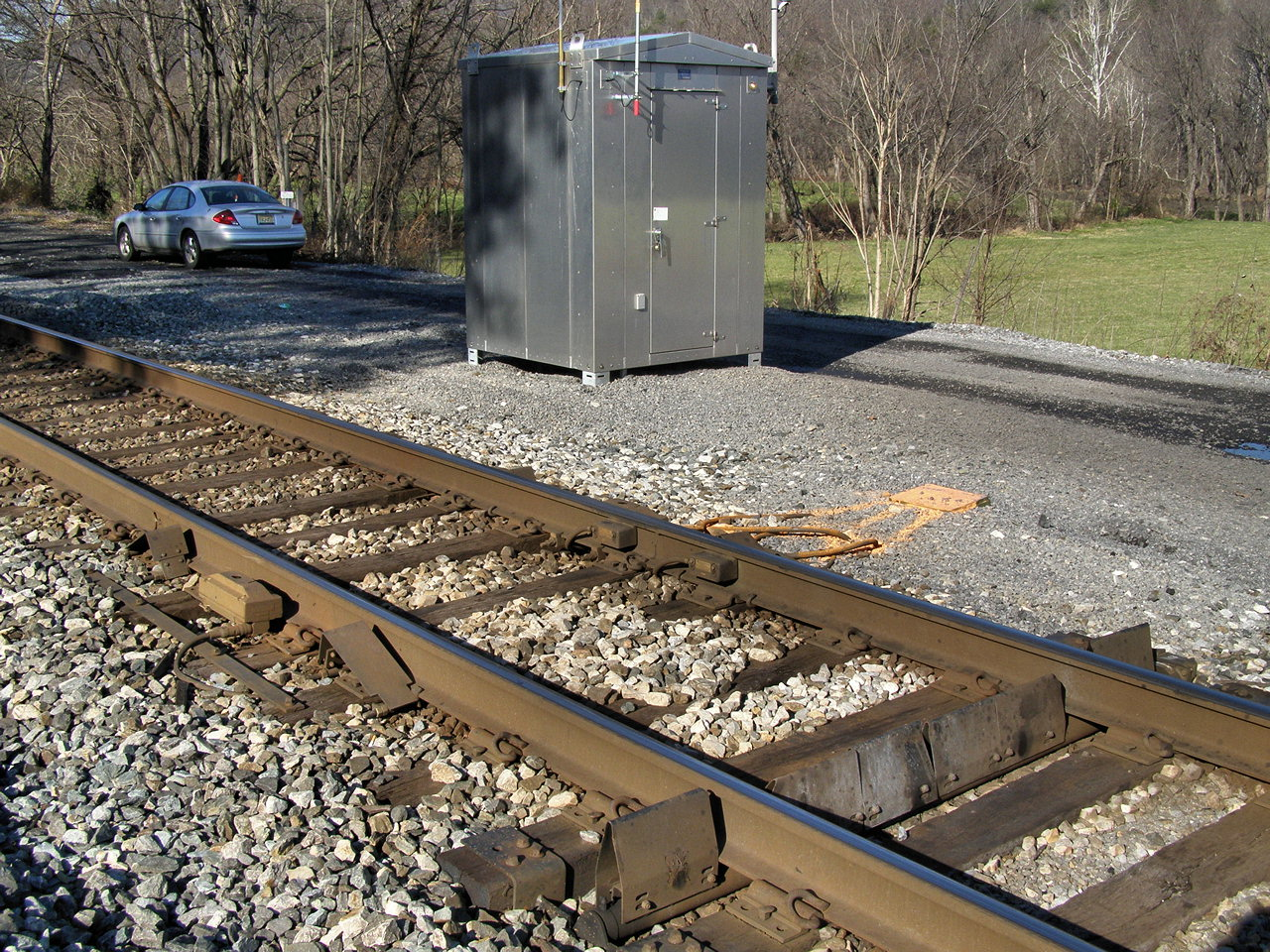
Standard North American installation of a combination hot box / dragging equipment detector

A defect detector is a wayside device used on railroads to detect problems in passing trains. The detectors are normally integrated into the tracks and often include sensors to detect several different kinds of problems that could occur, including overheating axle bearings ("hot boxes") and dragging equipment. When rolling stock passes by a detector, an automated readout notifies the crew of any defects via radio. Defect detectors were one of the inventions which enabled American railroads to eliminate the caboose at the rear of the train, as well as various station agents placed along active routes to detect unsafe conditions. The use of defect detectors has since spread overseas to other railroad systems.

== History ==
Before the advent of automated detectors, on-board train crew and trackside workers used to visually inspect trains for defects, like hot boxes (overheating bearings) which would smoke or glow red. By the 1940s, automatic defect detectors included infrared sensors for hotboxes, wires outlining the clearance envelope to detect loads outside the loading gauge, and "brittle bars" – frangible bars mounted between the rails – to detect dragging equipment. The detectors would transmit their data via wired links to remote read-outs in stations, offices or interlocking towers, where a stylus-and-cylinder gauge would record a reading for every axle; a defect would register a sharp spike on the graph and an alarm would sound or a visible signal would be given to the train crew.

The first computerized detectors had lights indicating the nature of defect and a numeric display of the associated axle number.

Seaboard Air Line was the first railroad to install defect detectors which "spoke" their results over radios carried by train crew starting around 1960, with the first being installed in Riceboro, Georgia, on their now abandoned Everett Subdivision. Later models allowed crews to interact with the detector using a touch tone function on their radios to recall the defect report. Today, defect detectors are typically part of the general monitoring platforms keeping track of train status.

Campville Defect Detector readout

A defect detector would sound like this: (This was the read out of CSX train Q452-05 by the Campville Defect Detector on April 6, 2019. The defect detector is located at Campville, Florida, on the CSX Wildwood Subdivision.)

CSX EQUIPMENT DEFECT DETECTOR. MILEPOST 7-0-0-POINT-1. NO DEFECTS. NO DEFECTS. TOTAL AXLES 7-3-8. TRAIN LENGTH 1-3-7-6-4. SPEED 4-5. END OF TRANSMISSION.

=== 21st century advancements ===
In the 2000s, defect detectors have increasingly incorporated computers to generate more detailed and accurate reports of train status. Modern systems use computer programs to analyze photographs and identify potential errors for review by humans. One focus has been on reducing the number of false positives, which require trains to stop and be inspected, causing delays.

== Sensors ==
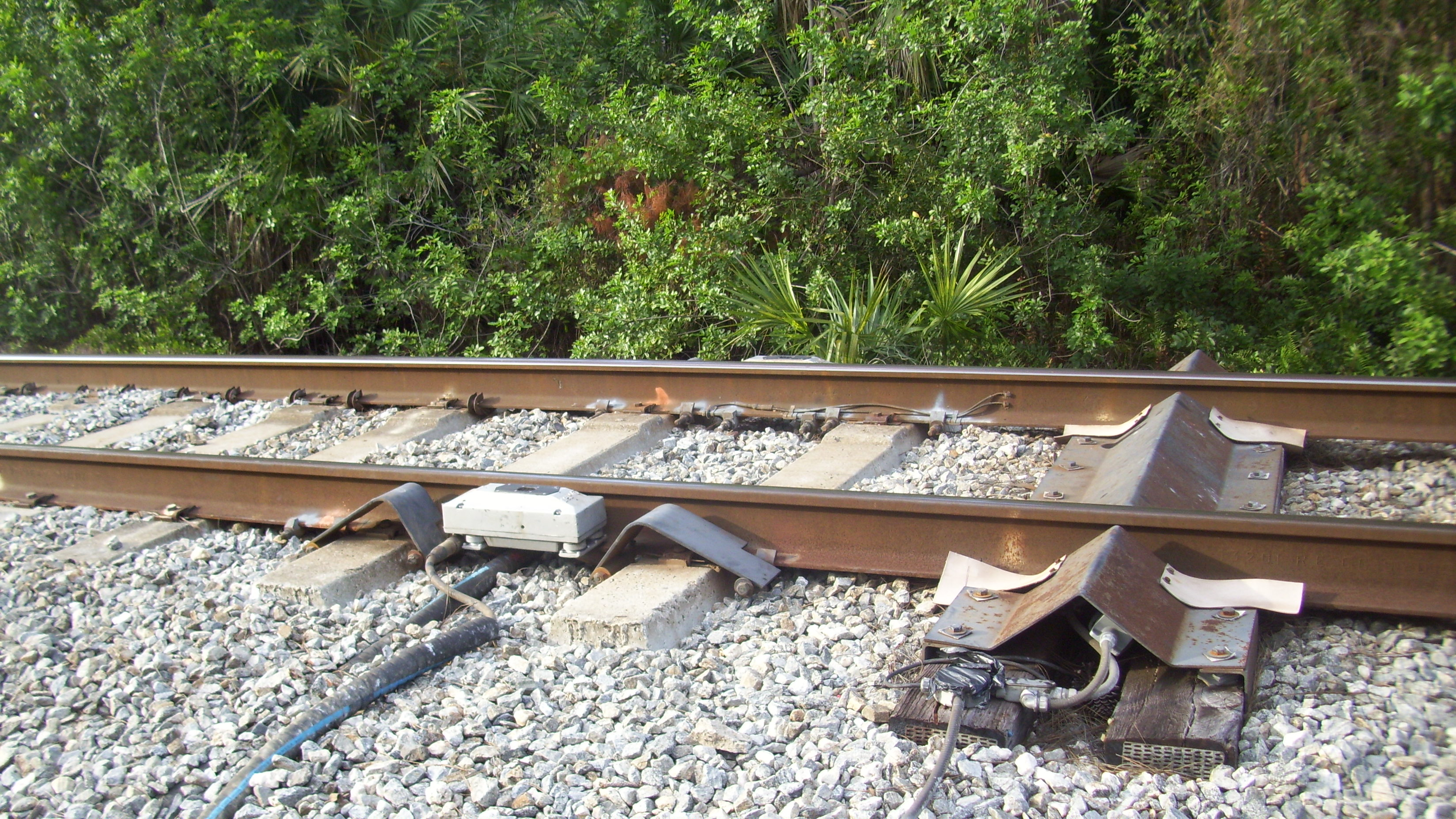
Hot box detector

Installed defect detectors can include a broad selection of different sensors. The sensor-types are described in the subsections, below:

=== Hot box ===
Hot boxes or hot bearing detectors (HBD) are used to measure the temperature of the journal bearings of a train. They typically consist of two infrared eyes on each side of the tracks looking up at the train's bearings.

They register the radiation from every journal bearing that passes over them. If a bearing reaches the maximum temperature for safe travel, the detector will flag and count it as a defect. Because bearings can burn off in as little as three minutes, hotbox detector installations are extremely common on many railroads.

=== Acoustic bearing detectors ===
These detectors listen to the sounds of passing trains and identify sounds that correspond with defective bearings. If a sound that is similar to the noise made by a defective bearing is identified, the car with the noise should be removed from the train at its next stop to be inspected and repaired if necessary. These are also used to reduce the number of false positives generated by hotbox detectors.

=== Dragging equipment detectors ===
A column of cones sits across the whole width of the railroad (just like a cross tie) attached to a switch. Anything dragging from the train will hit this cone, thus pushing it back, thus breaking a contact. It then returns to its normal position to prepare for anything else that might be dragging under the train. The detector will register this action and flag it as a defect. Brittle bars are still used elsewhere, but have to be repaired. Over time, dragging equipment detector's metal flaps need to be replaced because of extensive damage to them.

Single use systems typically involve a frangible engagement bar or a stainless steel wire / braid strung between the rails and typically outside the rails as well, fastened to the sleepers. If the bar or braid is hit by something, it breaks, and the circuit break alerts that there is a dragging item.

Auto-resetting systems typically involve a pivot pin system to allow the target to reset itself after a hit.

=== High car or shifted load detectors ===
Infrared beams are placed horizontally above the track (high car) or vertically next to the track (shifted load). Anything that breaks the beam will be counted as a defect. A high car detector is placed anywhere an excess height car could be misrouted onto a low clearance line. A shifted load detector is mainly found on railroads where double-stack trains are prevalent as the containers may become misaligned and present a hazard to bridge trusses or tunnel walls.

=== Wheel impact detectors ===
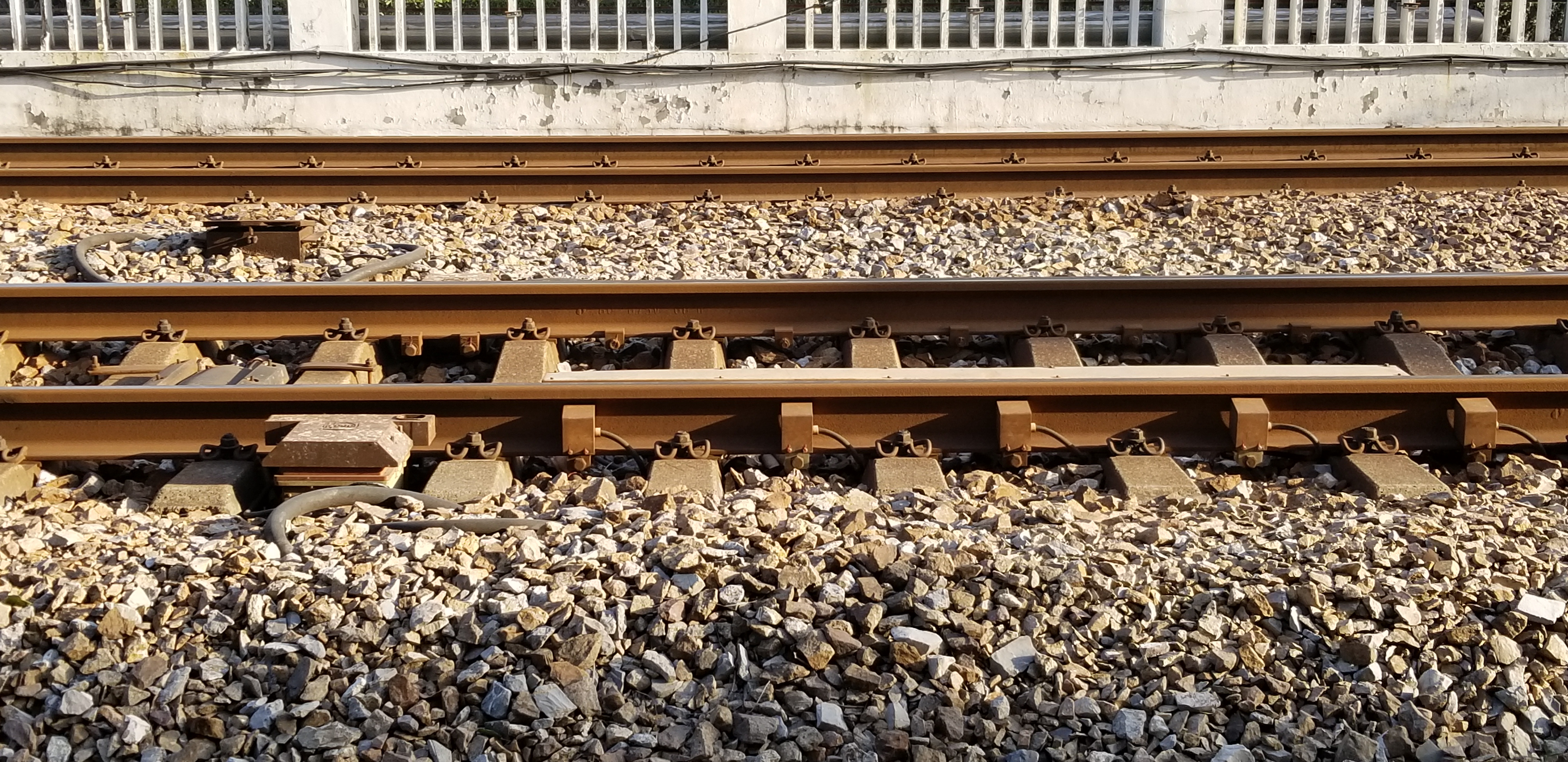
Hot box/wheel impact detectors at Shanghai Metro

Wheel sensors along the tracks feel for flat spots on the train's wheels. Any flat wheel that becomes too dangerous to travel on (a big flat spot on the train wheel) will be counted as a defect. Typically, these systems utilize accelerometers, strain gauges, fiber optic methods, or the very latest wheel impact phase detector (WIPD). A wheel impact load detector (WILD) measures impacts, but does not normalize these impact measurements against anything: simply the impact reading. They do not attempt to cater for differences in sprung mass, as they are measuring wheel defect impact rather than impact load. Therefore, the same wheel defect will register a much larger impact when a wagon is loaded, versus when it is empty.

A wheel condition monitoring detector monitors the condition of the wheel independent of sprung mass – independent of load. They do this by subtracting the wheel mass to get the normalized impact value. These systems are therefore typically better at detecting smaller defects with greater resolution.

=== Sliding / hot wheel detector ===
Typically a length of side-looking infrared detectors that can detect if a wheel has locked up and is sliding along the track or has had the brakes lock up causing the entire wheel to heat up.

=== Vehicle imbalance detectors (side-to-side and end-to-end) ===
These detectors are typically a crude weighbridge or WILD system, as they are only concerned with measuring weight differentials. They do not have to be as accurate as proper weighbridge or WILD systems, but just accurate enough to be able to average the weight of bogies during a train pass to calculate the relative balance of wagons, to establish if one rail is loaded unacceptably greater (in percentage) than the other. This is typically not performed on empty wagons because of the significant percentage imbalances that can be caused by fluctuations in weight due to bogie tracking geometry or hunting issues, which in terms of weight differentials are relatively accentuated compared to when a wagon is loaded.

=== Clearance gauge monitors ===
These detectors can use a variety of sensors (video, laser, infrared), but typically they are a safety curtain arrangement: a gantry over the rail with sensors to detect anything outside the clearance gauge. They therefore check the envelope of safety and alert if anything is detected outside of it.

=== Low hose (air hose) detectors ===
These systems are different from dragging equipment detectors, which are looking for anything dragging from the train connecting with the sleepers. Low Hose detectors are looking specifically between two wagons, to measure the droop of the brake hoses. The brake hoses need a bit of droop, but not so much that they can contact the ground or equipment and become dislodged.

Typically, these systems employ a vertical bar installed on one side of the track, with infrared sensors pointed across the track at a mate bar with receivers installed pointed back at the infrared beams. When a train goes past, the infrared sensors are looking in the coupling area specifically, and will alert if anything is detected in the area that is lower than acceptable.

=== Video / image inspection systems ===
These systems rely on an array of video devices in various locations between the rails and either side of the track, looking for particular bogie components (such as brake beam, springs, friction wedges, etc) and this data is then put through image analysis to determine if there are maintenance issues.

=== Wheel profile systems ===
These are laser arrays installed between or in place of a sleeper. They point up at the wheel profile and measure the profile shape specifically, taking various measurements of angles and lengths. The systems also give differential measurements for the two wheels of a wheel set.

=== Bogie performance detectors ===
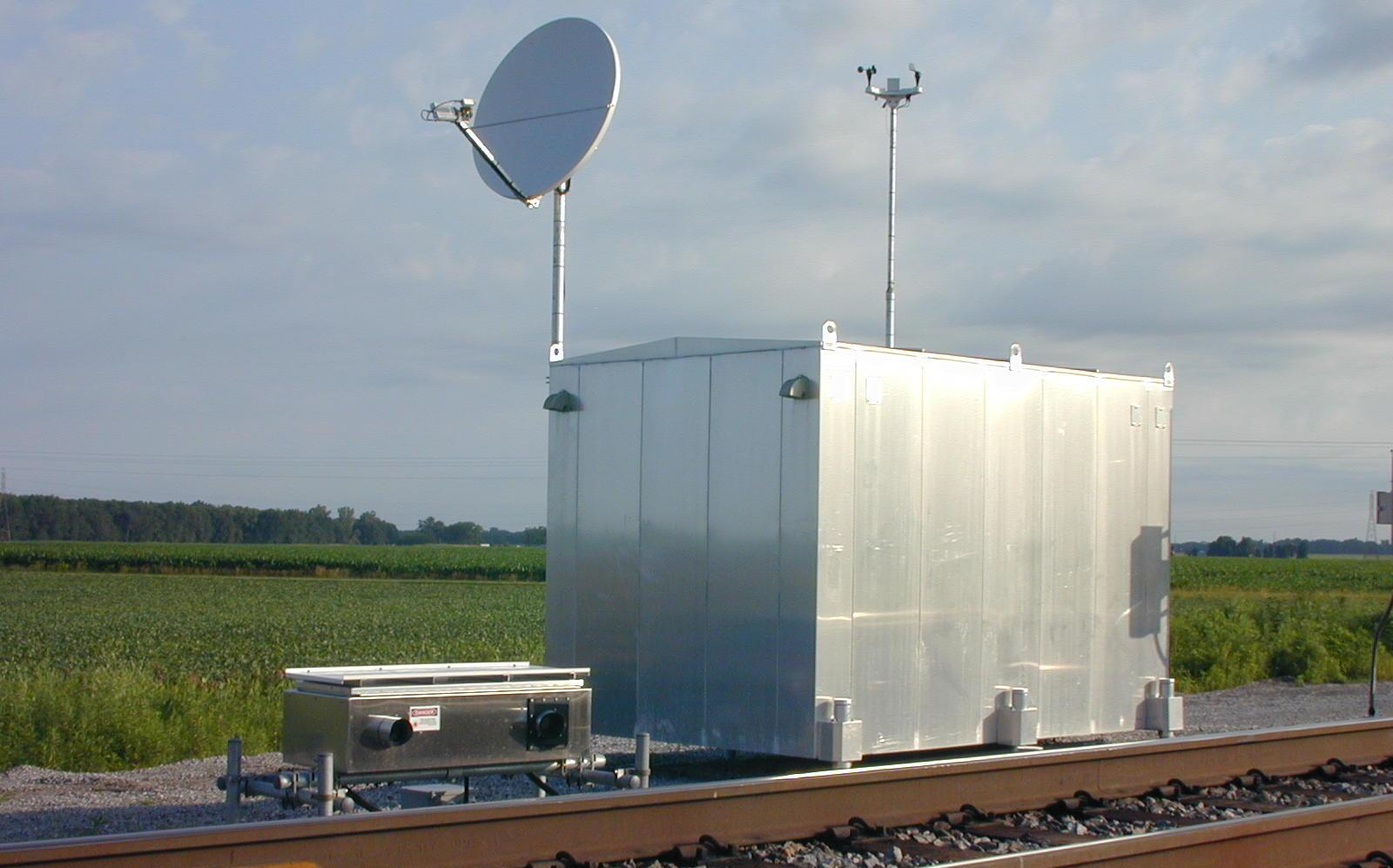
Bogie performance detector - TBOGI system

Bogie performance detectors monitor bogie tracking geometry, and hunting (instability) behaviour.

Bogie tracking geometry includes tracking position and angle of attack on a per-axle basis, as well as rotation, shift, inter-axle misalignment, and tracking error on a per-bogie basis. Bogie performance detectors can provide early detection of bogie defects, and early warning of derailment risks through flange climb or rail break.

Bogie performance detectors most often use optical methods, and are installed adjacent to the track with wheel sensors clamped to the rails.

=== Rail break monitors ===
These detectors either inject and monitor radio signals into the rail, or rely on electrical continuity of existing track-based circuits, to detect rail-line breaks. These detectors are most commonly used by high speed networks.

=== Rail temperature monitors ===
These detectors are a mesh of small detectors installed against a particular stretch of rail. The detectors are typically a mix of temperature sensors and strain gauges (so measure in degrees Celsius and kilonewtons force). They measure temperature and stress/tension on the rail, to make sure these measures do not go outside the bounds of structural integrity.

These systems are initially calibrated to a particular ‘neutral state’ by measuring the rail with neutral compression (no pulling or pushing) and an agreed neutral ambient temperature. The system then measures the rail to detect if these parameters get too far from neutral state, and will alert if the rail is approaching a breach of structural integrity.

=== Ground based noise (GBN) ===
This is a combination of accelerometers on the track, and another accelerometer installed in the bedrock next to the track. The correlation of these measurements indicates how much track-born noise is propagating through the ballast into the bedrock strata. This correlates directly with the noise levels experienced by surrounding area.

Ground based noise systems are commonly installed near or inside tunnels.

=== Brake block detectors ===
These are distinct from generic video imaging systems, as they are dedicated to specifically imaging the band above the rail that contains the brake shoe. The system identifies the back plate of the brake shoe, and then works out how much brake block is left in millimetres. If the system detects no brake block beyond the back plate, the system typically identifies the pad as missing.

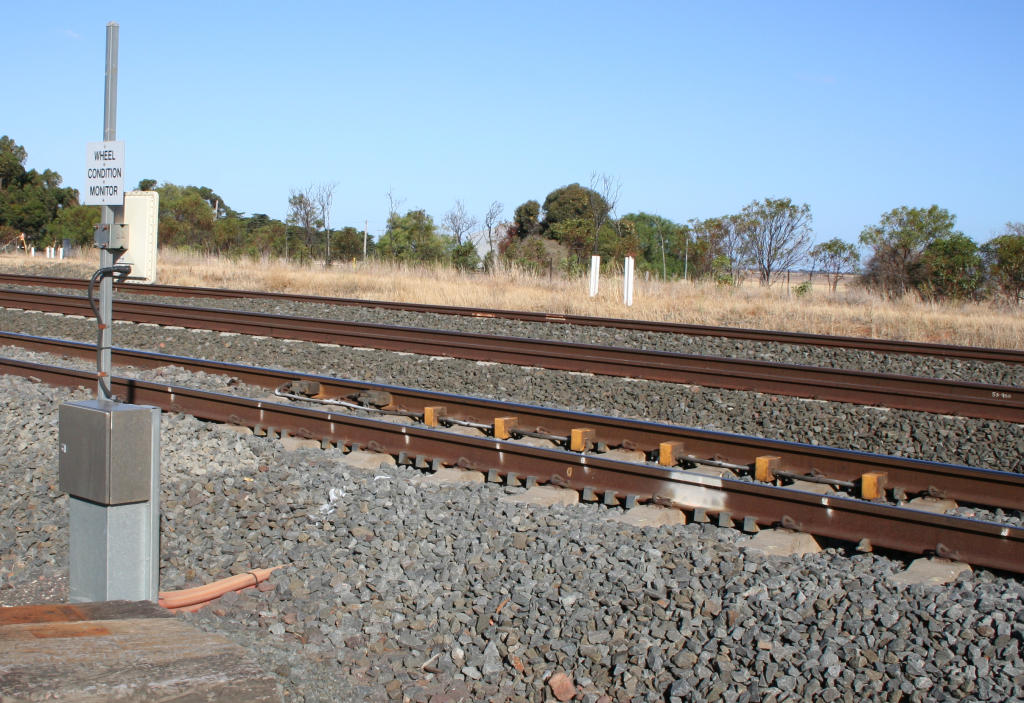
Sensors for the wheel condition monitor

=== Weighing in motion sensors for axle loads or imbalances ===
See: Railway weighing in motion and Railway axle loads

=== Wide-load detectors ===
A bridge spans the railroad with two laser beams that shine down on each side of the passing train. Anything that cuts through the beam will be counted as a defect. This sensor may also be integrated into the high car detector.

== Gallery ==
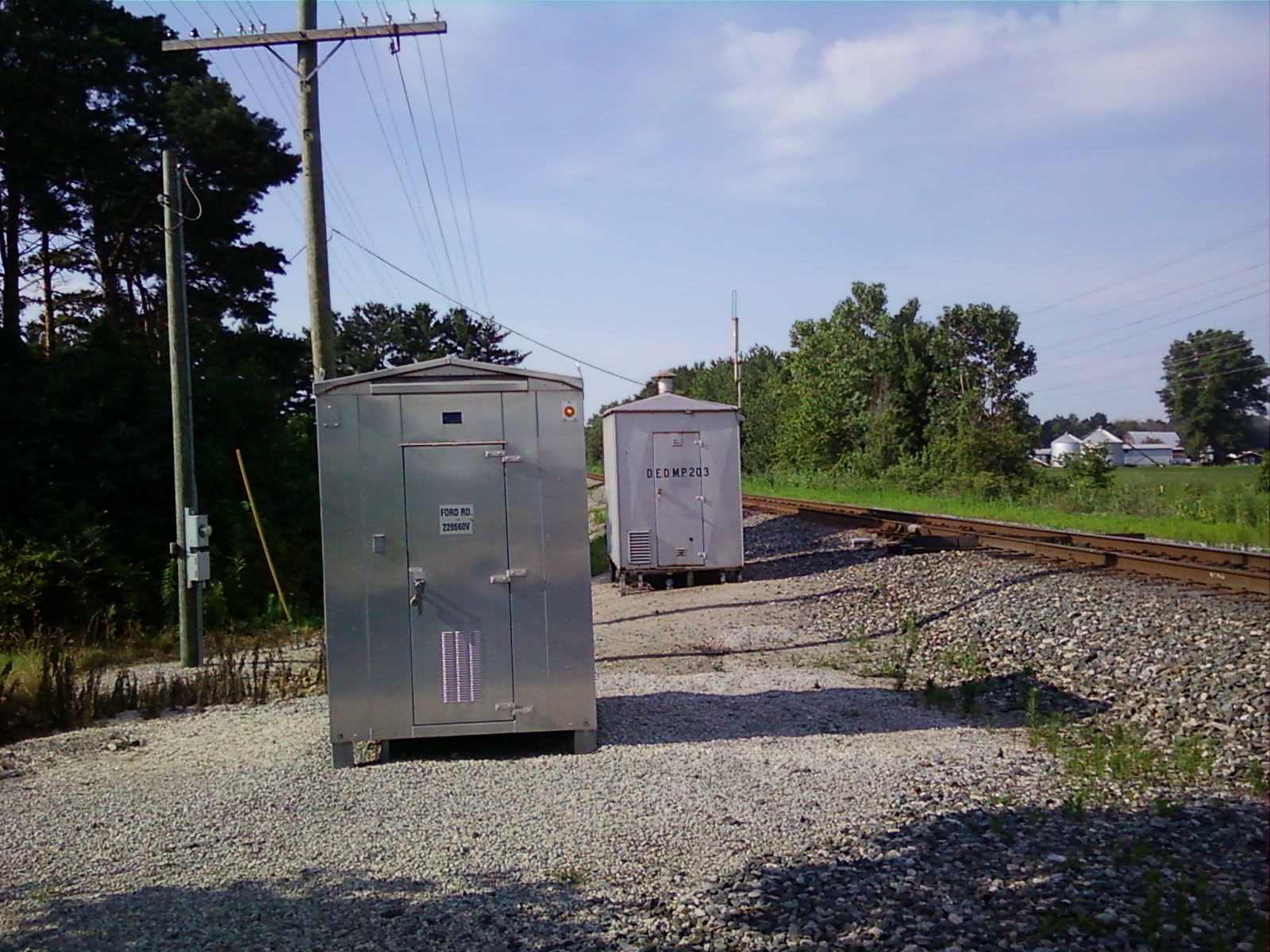
A CSX defect detector housed in the far equipment shed

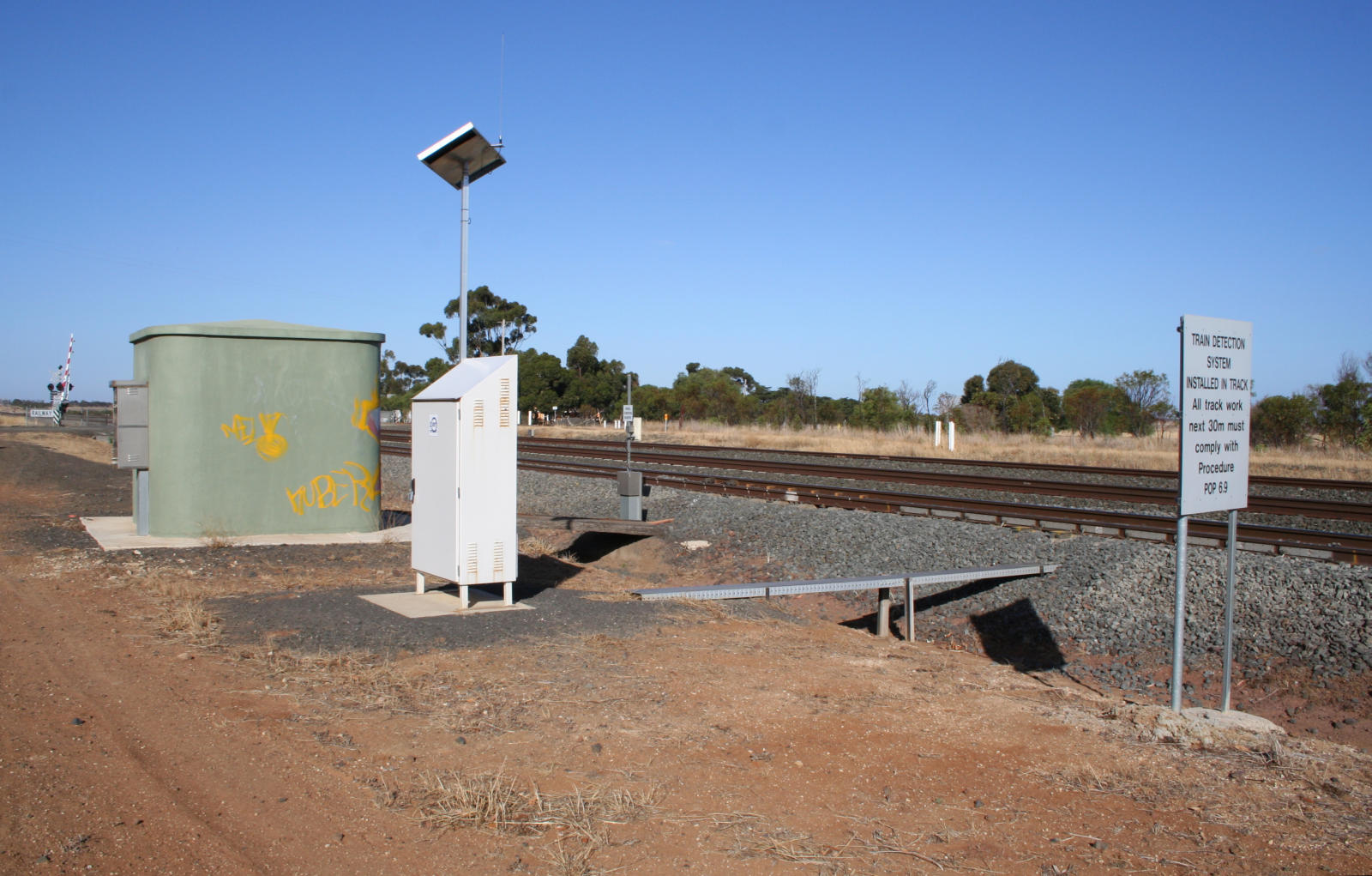
Overview of a wheel impact detector installation

== See also ==
- Axle counter
- Derailment
- Glossary of rail transport terms § D
