= Sayaka Kobayashi =

Japanese actress and voice actress (born 1970)

- 小林 さやか
- Born: October 12, 1970 (age 55); Sapporo, Hokkaido, Japan
- Occupations: Actress; voice actress
- Years active: 1992–present
- Agent: Seinenza Theater Company

Sayaka Kobayashi (小林 さやか, Kobayashi Sayaka; born October 12, 1970) is a Japanese actress and voice actress. She is affiliated with Seinenza Theater Company from April 1, 1992 through the Institute of Literary Research and the Juvenile Research Institute of the 16th period. She was born in Sapporo, Hokkaido.

Graduated from Hokkaido Sapporo Minami High School. Her father was a documentary film director, Chigusa Kobayashi. Her mother was an actress belonging to the NHK Sapporo Broadcasting Company, and Nobuko Matsui, who also performed many TV dramas such as "Toshiba Sunday Theater".

== Filmography ==
=== Anime ===
1999

- Wild Arms – Michelle

2013

- Sazae-san – Taiko Namino (4th voice)

2014

- Mushi-Shi -Next Passage- – Mother
- Sword Art Online II – Sada Akiyo

2015

- Garo: The Animation – Lara's Mother
- Subete ga F ni Naru – Yumiko Shindō
- Fafner in the Azure: Exodus – Suzana Tatekami

2016

- Aikatsu Stars! – Nanami Sakuraba

2018

- Devilman Crybaby – Akiko Makimura

=== Dubbing ===
==== Live-action ====
- Son Ye-jin
  - The Classic (Ji-hae, Ju-hie)
  - First Love Rally (Ju Il-Mae)
  - A Moment to Remember (Kim Su-jin)
  - April Snow (Seo-young)
  - Alone in Love (Yoo Eun-ho)
  - Spotlight (Seo Woo Jin)
  - Personal Taste (Park Kae-in)
  - The Last Princess (Princess Deok-hye)
- Keri Russell
  - Felicity (Felicity Porter)
  - Waitress (Jenna Hunterson)
  - The Americans (Elizabeth Jennings)
  - Dark Skies (Lacy Barrett)
- Vera Farmiga
  - The Conjuring (Lorraine Warren)
  - The Conjuring 2 (Lorraine Warren)
  - Annabelle Comes Home (Lorraine Warren)
  - The Conjuring: The Devil Made Me Do It (Lorraine Warren)
- Tracie Thoms
  - Cold Case (Kat Miller)
  - Private Practice (Colette)
  - Harry's Law (Katherine)
- 200 Cigarettes (Val (Christina Ricci))
- 3:10 to Yuma (Alice Evans (Gretchen Mol))
- 4 Legendary Witches (Moon Soo-in (Han Ji-hye))
- Agatha Christie's Marple (Gwenda Halliday (Sophia Myles))
- Agatha Christie's Poirot (Lucy Crale (Aimee Mullins), Marie McDermott (Alexandra Dowling))
- Air City (Seo Myung-woo (Moon Jeong-hee))
- Alien: Covenant (Maggie Faris (Amy Seimetz))
- All About Eve (PDDVD edition) (Eve Harrington (Anne Baxter))
- All In (Jenny (Kim Tae-yeon))
- All or Nothing (Samantha (Sally Hawkins))
- Along Came Polly (Lisa Kramer (Debra Messing))
- Annapolis (Ali (Jordana Brewster))
- Avengers: Endgame (Pepper Potts (Gwyneth Paltrow))
- Beast Stalker (Ann Gao (Zhang Jingchu))
- The Beat That My Heart Skipped (Miao Lin (Linh Dan Pham))
- The Blade (Ling (Song Lei))
- Blow (Barbara "Barbie" Buckley (Franka Potente))
- Bones (Linda McCord (Rebecca McFarland))
- Bridge of Dragons (Princess Halo (Valerie Chow))
- Brokeback Mountain (Alma (Michelle Williams))
- Burn Notice (Melanie (Marla Sokoloff))
- California Dreams (Samantha Woo Deswanchoo (Jennie Kwan))
- Castle (Emma Carnes (Anne Dudek))
- Castle Rock (Molly Strand (Melanie Lynskey))
- Cruel Love (Na In-jung (Lee Yo-won))
- The Darwin Awards (Siri Taylor (Winona Ryder))
- The Debt (Rachel Singer (Jessica Chastain))
- The Dilemma (Geneva Backman (Winona Ryder))
- Disaster Movie (Juney, Hannah Montana (Crista Flanagan))
- Don's Plum (Sara (Jenny Lewis))
- Don't Say a Word (Elisabeth Burrows (Brittany Murphy))
- Dong Yi (Queen Inhyeon (Park Ha-sun))
- Downsizing (Audrey Safranek (Kristen Wiig))
- Dracula 2000 (Mary Heller/Van Helsing (Justine Waddell))
- Drop Dead Diva (Lisa Shane (Nia Vardalos))
- The East (Sarah Moss (Brit Marling))
- End of Days (Christine York (Robin Tunney))
- ER (Gloria Milton (Emily Bergl), Christine (Liza Lapira))
- The Era of Vampires (Sasa (Anya))
- The Fabelmans (Mitzi Fabelman (Michelle Williams))
- The Faculty (2002 Fuji TV edition) (Marybeth Louise Hutchinson (Laura Harris))
- The Favourite (Sarah, Duchess of Marlborough (Rachel Weisz))
- Feast 2: Sloppy Seconds (Honey Pie (Jenny Wade))
- Feast III: The Happy Finish (Honey Pie (Jenny Wade))
- Firestarter: Rekindled (Charlie McGee (Marguerite Moreau))
- First Man (Janet Armstrong (Claire Foy))
- Flowers of the Prison (Court Lady Han (Lee Seung-ah))
- From Vegas to Macau (Ko's secretary (Annie Wu))
- Giant (Jung Young-sun (Yoon Yoo-sun))
- The Glass House (Ruby Baker (Leelee Sobieski))
- Goosebumps (Carly Beth (Kathryn Long))
- Goosebumps 2: Haunted Halloween (Kathy Quinn (Wendi McLendon-Covey))
- Gossip Girl (Eva Coupeau (Clémence Poésy))
- The Hangover (Jade (Heather Graham))
- The Hangover Part III (Jade (Heather Graham))
- He Loves Me... He Loves Me Not (Angélique (Audrey Tautou))
- Hereafter (Marie Lelay (Cécile de France))
- High Noon (2021 Star Channel edition) (Helen Ramírez (Katy Jurado))
- The Hospital (Guan Xin (Janine Chang))
- Hot Rod (Denise Harris (Isla Fisher))
- Hustle (Alice (Angel Coulby))
- Infestation (Cindy (Kinsey Packard))
- The Informant! (Ginger Whitacre (Melanie Lynskey))
- The Intern (Jocelyn Bennett (Dominique Swain))
- The Last Boy Scout (1996 NTV edition) (Darian Hallenbeck (Danielle Harris))
- Les Misérables (Cosette (Claire Danes))
- The Limits of Control (Molecules (Youki Kudoh))
- Little House on the Prairie (2019 NHK BS4K edition) (Caroline Quiner Ingalls (Karen Grassle))
- Lolita (Lolita (Dominique Swain))
- Mad City (Laurie Callahan (Mia Kirshner))
- The Marine 3: Homefront (Amanda Carter (Camille Sullivan))
- May 18 (Park Shin-ae (Lee Yo-won))
- Me and You and Everyone We Know (Christine Jesperson (Miranda July))
- Moby Dick (Dr. Michelle Herman (Renee O'Connor))
- Mr. & Mrs. Smith (2010 TV Asahi edition) (Jasmine (Kerry Washington))
- Mr. Nice Guy (Miki (Miki Lee))
- The Mustang (Psychologist (Connie Britton))
- My Fake Fiancé (Bonnie (Diane Neal))
- My Lovely Sam Soon (Yoo Hee-jin (Jung Ryeo-won))
- My So-Called Life (Rayanne Graff (A. J. Langer))
- Ned Kelly (Julia Cook (Naomi Watts))
- Notting Hill (Honey Thacker (Emma Chambers))
- On the Edge (Rachel Row (Tricia Vessey))
- Paradise (Mi-Kyeong (Kim Ha-neul))
- Patrick Melrose (Eleanor Melrose (Jennifer Jason Leigh))
- The Patriot (2003 TV Tokyo edition) (Anne Howard (Lisa Brenner))
- Pearl Harbor (Nurse Barbara (Catherine Kellner))
- Police Story 4: First Strike (Annie Tsui (Annie Wu))
- Possession (Blanche Glover (Lena Headey))
- Primeval (DVD edition) (Claudia Brown/Jennifer Lewis (Lucy Brown))
- The Proposal (Gertrude (Malin Åkerman))
- Rat Race (Tracy Faucet (Amy Smart))
- Rigor Mortis (Yeung Feng (Kara Hui))
- Roboshark (Trish (Alexis Peterman))
- Rumor Has It (Annie Huttinger (Mena Suvari))
- Safe House (Katy Carmichael (Marsha Thomason))
- Scream 7 (Jessica Bowden (Anna Camp))
- The Sentinel (Jill Marin (Eva Longoria))
- A Separation (Razieh (Sareh Bayat))
- Shazam! (Marilyn (Caroline Palmer))
- Sherlock (Sarah Sawyer (Zoe Telford))
- Sixteen Candles (Samantha "Sam" Baker (Molly Ringwald))
- Soulmate (Soo-kyung (Lee Soo-kyung))
- Sound of Colors (Cheung Hoi-yeuk (Miriam Yeung))
- State of Play (Della Frye (Rachel McAdams))
- Superman (2014 WOWOW edition) (Lois Lane (Margot Kidder))
- Superman II (2014 WOWOW edition) (Lois Lane (Margot Kidder))
- The Stranger Within (Emily (Estella Warren))
- Temptress Moon (Pang Ruyi (Gong Li))
- The Time Machine (2006 TV Asahi edition) (Emma (Sienna Guillory))
- Tooth Fairy (Carly Harris-Thompson (Ashley Judd))
- Treasure Buddies (Mala (Bonnie Somerville))
- Troy (Briseis (Rose Byrne))
- Twilight (Mel Ames (Reese Witherspoon))
- Under Siege 2: Dark Territory (Sarah Ryback (Katherine Heigl))
- Valkyrie (Nina von Stauffenberg (Carice van Houten))
- Vanilla Sky (Sofia Serrano (Penélope Cruz))
- The Veil (Karen Sweetzer (Aleksa Palladino))
- Vertical Limit (Annie Garrett (Robin Tunney))
- The Village (2008 NTV edition) (Ivy Walker (Bryce Dallas Howard))
- Volcano (Kelly Roark (Gaby Hoffmann))
- The Wedding Singer (Julia Sullivan (Drew Barrymore))
- Welcome Home Roscoe Jenkins (Lucinda Allen (Nicole Ari Parker))
- The Well (Katherine (Miranda Otto))
- The West Wing (Ainsley Hayes (Emily Procter))
- White Collar (Elizabeth Burke (Tiffani Thiessen))
- Women of the Sun (Shin Do-young/Kim Han-sook (Kim Ji-soo))
- Xanadu (Kira (Olivia Newton-John))
- Yogi Bear (Rachel Johnson (Anna Faris))

==== Animation ====
- Charlotte's Web (2006 DVD edition) (Charlotte A. Cavatica)
- Corpse Bride (Victoria Everglot)
- F Is for Family (Sue Murphy)
- Freej (Um Allawi)
- Rolie Polie Olie (Mrs. Polina Polie)
