= Ken Hudson Campbell =

American actor (born 1962)

- Born: Kenneth Hudson Campbell; June 5, 1962 (age 64); Elmhurst, Illinois, U.S.
- Occupations: Actor, improvisational comedian
- Spouse: Kathleen Campbell
- Children: 2

Kenneth Hudson Campbell (born June 5, 1962) is an American actor.

== Early life ==
Ken Campbell attended York Community High School in Elmhurst, Illinois, Southern Illinois University Carbondale and Columbia College Chicago as a film major. He began training in comedic improvisation at The Players Worksop of The Second City in 1983. He then performed with the comedy group Contents Under Pressure before joining The Second City's National Touring Company. He then became a member of the Resident Company of The Second City Northwest, and after 3 revues there he was hired on to The Second City's e.t.c. Theater as well, before moving to Los Angeles, CA.

== Career ==
While he was still a member of The Second City, Campbell played Santa in Home Alone. He then played "Animal" for three years on the Fox television series Herman's Head. He was Buckman in the Fox 1996 submarine comedy Down Periscope. Campbell appeared in the Seinfeld episode "The Seven", where he played Ken, the husband of Susan's first cousin, Carrie. He played "Bruce", the owner of a bookstore in the 1997 Disney Channel Original Movie Under Wraps. He appeared as oil driller Max Lennert in the film Armageddon, and as the "Man in Hall" in Groundhog Day. Campbell provided the voice of Baby Bob in the CBS television series Baby Bob and commercial campaigns for FreeInternet.com and Quiznos.

Campbell was the voice of the beaver Gordon along with Norm Macdonald in Canadian Bell Mobility phone commercials and served for a decade as the primary imaging voice for Cleveland adult hits station WHLK "106.5 The Lake". He is presently the primary voice heard on KYOT 95.5 "The Mountain" radio in Phoenix, Arizona.

He voiced the bear, Boomer, in the animated film Wonder Park (2019), and the unaired consequent animated series on Nickelodeon.

== Personal life ==
Campbell is married to Kathleen Campbell, with whom he has two children.

=== Health ===
In October 2023, Campbell was diagnosed with a form of oral cancer called squamous cell carcinoma, which manifested as a tumor on the bottom of his mouth in which it enroached its teeth. His diagnosis came amid financial challenges, as Campbell lost his health insurance during the 2023 SAG-AFTRA strike, leading to his daughter launching a campaign on GoFundMe to cover the costs of treatment. The campaign was supported by fans and celebrities, most notably Steve Carell and Nick Offerman, which raised over $124,000 out of its $150,000 goal, which enabled the procedure and its subsequent care such as skin grafts, a tracheotomy, and a feeding tube. He then underwent a 10-hour surgery on December 7, 2023 to remove the tumor in addition to his affected lymph nodes and portion of his jawbone, with reconstruction by using bone from his fibula in the leg.

== Filmography ==
=== Film ===
| Year | Title | Role | Notes |
|---|---|---|---|
| 1990 | Home Alone | Santa | |
| 1993 | Groundhog Day | Man in Hallway | |
| 1996 | Down Periscope | Buckman | |
| 1997 | Under Wraps | Bruce | |
| 1998 | Armageddon | Max Lennert | |
| 1998 | The Jungle Book: Mowgli's Story | Wolf 1 | |
| 1999 | Breakfast of Champions | Eliot Rosewater / Gilbert | |
| 2000 | Titan A.E. | Po | |
| 2000 | Coyote Ugly | Biker | |
| 2000 | The Ladies Man | Hal | |
| 2000 | Joseph: King of Dreams | Baker | |
| 2001 | Dr. Dolittle 2 | Various roles | |
| 2002 | Showtime | Cop in Gym | |
| 2002 | Boat Trip | Tom | |
| 2004 | A One Time Thing | Sean | |
| 2005 | Bewitched | Writer | |
| 2007 | Stories USA | Chester | |
| 2014 | Live Nude Girls | Cannonball Calhoun | |
| 2017 | Above Ground | Jake Liebig | |
| 2017 | The Trouble with Mistletoe | Uber driver | |
| 2018 | Adolescence | Record Store Owner | |
| 2019 | Wonder Park | Boomer | Voice role |
| 2021 | Digging to Death | Mark Armstrong | |

=== Television ===
| Year | Title | Role | Notes |
|---|---|---|---|
| 1991 | Life As We Know It! | Ensemble | Television film |
| 1991–1994 | Herman's Head | Animal (Lust) / Chuck | 72 episodes |
| 1992 | Dinosaurs | Crazy Lou | Episode: "Leader of the Pack" |
| 1995 | What a Cartoon! | Elmo | Episode: "Drip Dry Drips" |
| 1996 | Seinfeld | Ken | Episode: "The Seven" |
| 1996 | Duckman | Guyville Denizen | Episode: "Exile in Guyville" |
| 1996 | Local Heroes | Eddie Trakacs | 7 episodes |
| 1996–1997 | Aaahh!!! Real Monsters | Various voices | 2 episodes |
| 1997 | The Naked Truth | Roland, the Cab Driver | Episode: "A Year in a Life" |
| 1997 | Life with Louie | Ben Glenn | 2 episodes |
| 1998 | Caroline in the City | Gil | Episode: "Caroline and the Drycleaner" |
| 1998 | Fantasy Island | Jerry Potsweiler | Episode: "Handymen" |
| 2000 | Strangers with Candy | Glenn the Bus Driver | Episode: "The Blank Page" |
| 2000 | God, the Devil and Bob | Barry | 5 episodes |
| 2002–2003 | Baby Bob | Baby Bob / Neighbor | 14 episodes |
| 2003 | My Big Fat Greek Life | Joe the Cop | Episode: "The Free Lunch" |
| 2003 | The Practice | Roland Huff | 4 episodes |
| 2006 | The Loop | Spencer | Episode: "Bear Drop Soup" |
| 2007 | Curb Your Enthusiasm | Painter | Episode: "The Ida Funkhouser Roadside Memorial" |
| 2010 | United States of Tara | Caterer | Episode: "From This Day Forward" |
| 2011 | Meter Men | Dr. Lima | Television film |
| 2012 | Gravity Falls | Ergman Bratzman | Episode: "Boyz Crazy" |
| 2015 | Mike & Molly | Big Stain | Episode: "Buy the Book" |
| 2015 | You'll Be Fine | Merlin | Episode: "Merlin the Mistake" |
| 2015 | Girl Meets World | Jingles the Clown | Episode: "Girl Meets Cory and Topanga" |
