= Masuo Amada =

Japanese actor

- 天田 益男
- Born: January 20, 1958 (age 68); Hyōgo Prefecture, Japan
- Education: Osaka University of Arts
- Occupations: Actor; voice actor
- Years active: 1985–present
- Agent: Seinenza Theater Company

Masuo Amada (天田 益男, Amada Masuo; born January 20, 1958) is a Japanese actor and voice actor from Hyōgo Prefecture. He is affiliated with the Seinenza Theater Company, and graduated from the Osaka University of Arts.

== Filmography ==
=== Television animation ===
- Eat-Man (1997–1998) (Nowāru)
- Chūka Ichiban (1997–1998) (Rōko)
- Initial D: Fourth Stage (1998–2014) (Aikawa/Man in Evo V)
- Trigun (1998) (Monev the Gale)
- Arc the Lad (1999) (Dain)
- Wild Arms: Twilight Venom (1999–2000) (Korī)
- Rave Master (2002) (Fūa)
- Burst Angel (2004) (Tetsuzō)
- Naruto (2004) (Manda)
- Pokémon (2004) (Silver)
- Monster (2004–2005) (Inspector Gantz)
- Black Cat (2005) (Ganza)
- Bleach (2007) (Mock Arrancar)
- Fullmetal Alchemist: Brotherhood (2009) (Darius)
- Ikki Tousen: Xtreme Xecutor (2010) (King Bokuroku)
- Mitsudomoe (2010–2011) (Marui Soujirou)
- Seikon no Qwaser (2010) (Croa)
- SD Gundam Sangokuden Brave Battle Warriors (2010–2011) (Shuusou Dovenwolf)
- One Piece (2012) (Raochutan (ep. 542))
- DokiDoki! PreCure (2013–2014) (Gula)
- Gate: Jieitai Kanochi nite, Kaku Tatakaeri (2015–2016) (Dulan)
- JoJo's Bizarre Adventure: Diamond Is Unbreakable (2016) (Male)
- 91 Days (2016) (Ganzo Alary)
- High School DxD Hero (2018) (Hades)
- The Idaten Deities Know Only Peace (2021) (Nept)
- Let's Go Karaoke! (2025) (Former Cram School Teacher)
- Iron Wok Jan (2026) (Nichido Otani)

=== Original Video Animation ===
- Ninja Resurrection (xxxx) (Hozoin Inshun)

=== Video games ===
- Spyro 2: Ripto's Rage! (2000) (Moneybags)
- Final Fantasy X (2001) (Jecht)
- Final Fantasy X-2 (2003) (Jecht)
- True Crime: Streets of LA (2004) (Big Chong)
- Initial D: Street Stage (2006) (Aikawa/Man in Evo V)
- Yakuza 2 (2006) (Jin Goda)
- Dissidia: Final Fantasy (2008) (Jecht)
- Dissidia 012 Final Fantasy (2011) (Jecht)
- Initial D Arcade Stage 8 Infinity ∞ (2014) (Aikawa/Man in Evo V)
- Dissidia Final Fantasy NT (2017) (Jecht)
- Yakuza Kiwami 2 (2017) (Jin Goda)

=== Live action ===
- B-Fighter Kabuto (1996–1997) (Cold-Blooded Armored General Mukaderinger (eps. 28 - 35, 38 - 45, 47 - 49))
- Kaizoku Sentai Gokaiger (2011) (Salamandam (ep. 3))
- Doubutsu Sentai Zyuohger (2016) (Sumotoron (ep. 33))

=== Dubbing roles ===
==== Live action ====
- .45 (Big Al (Angus Macfadyen))
- 15 Minutes (Oleg Razgul (Oleg Taktarov))
- The Admiral: Roaring Currents (Wakisaka Yasuharu (Cho Jin-woong))
- The Big Hit (Crunch (Bokeem Woodbine))
- Bridge of Dragons (Emmerich (Gary Hudson))
- The Bucket List (Roger Chambers (Alfonso Freeman))
- Chocolate (No. 8 (Pongpat Wachirabunjong))
- Cleveland Abduction (Ariel Castro (Raymond Cruz))
- Cross Wars (Muerte (Danny Trejo))
- The Crow (1997 TV Tokyo edition) (T-Bird (David Patrick Kelly))
- Deadpool & Wolverine (Victor Creed / Sabretooth (Tyler Mane))
- Dolemite Is My Name (Ben Taylor (Craig Robinson))
- Dreamer (Balon (Luis Guzmán))
- ER (Henry "Rena" Colton (Vondie Curtis-Hall))
- Fantastic Four (The Thing (Michael Chiklis))
- Fantastic Four: Rise of the Silver Surfer (The Thing (Michael Chiklis))
- Fatherhood (Howard (Paul Reiser))
- Hidalgo (Aziz (Adam Alexi-Malle))
- Jarhead (Staff Sgt. Sykes (Jamie Foxx))
- Killing Me Softly (Klaus (Ulrich Thomsen))
- Killing Them Softly (Mickey (James Gandolfini))
- Léon: The Professional (1996 TV Asahi edition) (Benny (Keith A. Glascoe))
- Mesrine (Paul (Gilles Lellouche))
- Miami Vice (Ricardo Tubbs (Jamie Foxx))
- Mission: Impossible – Ghost Protocol (Brij Nath (Anil Kapoor))
- Mortal Engines (Stigwood (Mark Hadwood))
- Paddington 2 (T-Bone (Tom Davis))
- Real (Jo Won-geun (Sung Dong-il))
- The Rum Diary (Bob Sala (Michael Rispoli))
- The Taking of Pelham 123 (John Johnson (Michael Rispoli))
- This Is the End (Craig Robinson)
- Three (Fatty (Lam Suet))
- Three Kings (Staff Sergeant Chief Elgin (Ice Cube))
- The Young Master (Bull (Fan Mei-Sheng))
- xXx (El Jefe (Danny Trejo))

==== Animation ====
- Brave (Lord MacGuffin)
- Flushed Away (Whitey)
- Planes: Fire & Rescue (Chug)
