= The Movie (2022 film) =

- Directed by: Michael Mandell
- Written by: Michael Mandell
- Produced by: Michael Mandell; Dr. Snaxxx
- Starring: Bonnie Root; Jarrod Pistilli
- Cinematography: Ricardo Jacques Gale
- Edited by: Justin Vea
- Production company: Dr. Snaxxx
- Distributed by: Gravitas Ventures
- Release date: 6 September 2022
- Running time: 85 minutes
- Country: United States
- Language: English

The Movie is a 2022 American comedy horror film directed by Michael Mandell, starring Bonnie Root and Jarrod Pistilli.

== Cast ==
- Bonnie Root as Janet
- Jarrod Pistilli as Walter

== Release ==
The film was released on digital platforms on 6 September 2022.

== Reception ==
Michael Talbot-Haynes of Film Threat gave the film a score of 6.5/10 and wrote that the film has "one of the best performances by an actress showing the world what real agony looks like" despite being "soaked in controversy" and having "more triggers than a red-state gun show"

Martin Unsworth of Starburst rated the film 2 stars out of 5 and wrote that the film is a "well-made two-hander", which "makes the distasteful moments jar even more".

Film critic Andy Klein called the film "nasty" and "sadistic".
