= Tomoyuki Dan =

Japanese actor and voice actor (1963–2013)

- 檀 臣幸
- Born: Yoshio Tanaka (田中 良雄); August 6, 1963; Osaka Prefecture, Japan
- Died: October 10, 2013 (aged 50); Shinjuku, Tokyo, Japan
- Occupations: Actor, voice actor
- Years active: 1987–2013
- Notable credit: Naruto as Kisame Hoshigaki
- Spouse: Ryoko Gi
- Children: 1

Tomoyuki Dan (檀 臣幸, Dan Tomoyuki; August 6, 1963 – October 10, 2013) was a Japanese actor and voice actor from Osaka Prefecture. He was affiliated with Seinenza Theater Company at the time of his death.

With his unique voice, Dan was best known for the voices of Kisame Hoshigaki in Naruto and Cronicle Asher in Mobile Suit Victory Gundam. In 2010, he portrayed Shinkuro Isaka in Kamen Rider W. He was also the dubbing voice actor for Christian Bale and Ben Stiller. Dan died on October 10, 2013, at age 50, due to relapse of aortic dissection.

== Roles ==
=== Television animation ===
- Air Gear (Masaya Orihara)
- Detective Conan (Maejima, Toshihide Wakamatsu, Keiki Nigaki, Hiroto Akashi, Kijun Matsunaka)
- Eat-Man (Taylor)
- Ghost in the Shell: Arise (Ishikawa)
- Jūshin Enbu HERO TALES (Mōjun)
- Kaitō Saint Tail (Oikawa)
- Kin'iro no Corda ~primo passo~ (Southern instrument store owner)
- Mobile Suit Victory Gundam (Cronicle Asher)
- Naruto (Kisame Hoshigaki, Futa Kagetsu)
- Naruto: Shippuden (Kisame Hoshigaki)
- Toriko (Tengu Branchi)
- Tweeny Witches (The Ecoo fairy)
- Nyaniganyandā Nyandākamen (Sarakichi, Nezumi Sennin, Pittari-san, greengrocer, Tsubarō)
- Planetes (Sasha)
- Suite PreCure (Hōjō Dan)

=== OVA ===
- Legend of the Galactic Heroes (Emerson)

=== Theatrical animation ===
- Naruto the Movie: Road to Ninja (Kisame Hoshigaki)

=== Dubbing ===
==== Live action ====
- Christian Bale
  - Batman Begins (Bruce Wayne / Batman)
  - Rescue Dawn (Dieter Dengler)
  - 3:10 to Yuma (Dan Evans)
  - The Dark Knight (Bruce Wayne / Batman)
  - Terminator Salvation (John Connor)
  - The Dark Knight Rises (Bruce Wayne / Batman)
- Ben Stiller
  - Flirting with Disaster (Mel Coplin)
  - Along Came Polly (Reuben Feffer)
  - Night at the Museum (Larry Daley)
  - Night at the Museum: Battle of the Smithsonian (Larry Daley)
  - Tower Heist (Josh Kovaks)
- 16 Blocks (Edward "Eddie" Bunker (Mos Def))
- 27 Dresses (Kevin Doyle (James Marsden))
- Band of Brothers (William Guarnere (Frank John Hughes))
- Battle: Los Angeles (Kevin J. "Specks" Harris (Ne-Yo))
- Big Daddy (Nazo (Rob Schneider))
- Big Fish (Norther Winslow (Steve Buscemi))
- Blades of Glory (Stranz Van Waldenberg (Will Arnett))
- Blitz (Barry "Blitz" Weiss (Aidan Gillen))
- Bootmen (Mitchell Okden (Sam Worthington))
- Breakdown (Billy (Jack Noseworthy))
- Bullet to the Head (Marcus Baptiste (Christian Slater))
- Bulworth (L.D. (Don Cheadle))
- Catch Me If You Can (Tom Fox (Frank John Hughes))
- Charlie's Angels (Jason Gibbons (Matt LeBlanc))
- Charlie's Angels: Full Throttle (Jason Gibbons (Matt LeBlanc))
- Che (Camilo Cienfuegos (Santiago Cabrera))
- Cliffhanger (1997 NTV edition) (Evan (Max Perlich))
- The Darkest Hour (Skyler (Joel Kinnaman))
- Deuce Bigalow: Male Gigolo (Tiberius Jefferson "T.J." Hicks (Eddie Griffin))
- Devil (Detective Bowden (Chris Messina))
- Falling Skies (season 1–2) (John Pope (Colin Cunningham))
- Fright Night (Peter Vincent (David Tennant))
- Green Zone (Freddy (Khalid Abdalla))
- In Dreams (Vivian Thompson (Robert Downey Jr.))
- The Incredible Hulk (Emil Blonsky / Abomination (Tim Roth))
- Kill Switch (Lazerus (Michael Filipowich))
- Knockaround Guys (Chris Scarpa (Andrew Davoli))
- Knockin' on Heaven's Door (Rudi Wurlitzer (Jan Josef Liefers))
- La Vie en rose (Louis Alphonse Gassion (Jean-Paul Rouve))
- The Lincoln Lawyer (Mickey Haller (Matthew McConaughey))
- The Lone Ranger (Captain Jay Fuller (Barry Pepper))
- The Man from Nowhere (Detective Kim Chi-gon (Kim Tae-hoon))
- Max (Adolf Hitler (Noah Taylor))
- Mr. Deeds (Emilio Lopez (John Turturro))
- The Mummy (Benny (Kevin J. O'Connor))
- Narc (Darnell 'Big Love D' Beery (Busta Rhymes))
- No Good Deed (Hoop (Doug Hutchison))
- Norbit (Pope Sweet Jesus (Eddie Griffin))
- Nurse Betty (Wesley (Chris Rock))
- O Brother, Where Art Thou? (Delmar O'Donnell (Tim Blake Nelson))
- Ocean's Twelve (2007 NTV edition) (Basher Tarr (Don Cheadle))
- October Sky (Roy Lee Cooke (William Lee Scott))
- Old Dogs (Troop Leader Barry (Matt Dillon))
- Out of Sight (Glenn Michaels (Steve Zahn))
- Oz (Augustus Hill (Harold Perrineau))
- Panic Room (Junior (Jared Leto))
- The Paperboy (Ward Jensen (Matthew McConaughey))
- Primeval (Steven Johnson (Orlando Jones))
- Ravenous (Private Cleaves (David Arquette))
- Red Planet (Chip Pettengill (Simon Baker))
- Riding in Cars with Boys (Raymond Hasek (Steve Zahn))
- Runner Runner (Agent Shavers (Anthony Mackie))
- Sabrina the Teenage Witch (Mr. Eugene Pool (Paul Feig))
- Sand Sharks (Jimmy Green (Corin Nemec))
- Shall We Dance? (Chic (Bobby Cannavale))
- Shaolin Soccer (Empty Hand / Lightning Hand (Danny Chan Kwok-kwan))
- She-Wolf of London (Male Student 2)
- Snatch (Mickey O'Neil (Brad Pitt))
- Takers (Jack Welles (Matt Dillon))
- The Thin Red Line (Pvt. Jack Bell (Ben Chaplin))
- Three Kings (Specialist Walter Wogeman (Jamie Kennedy))
- Trainspotting (Francis "Franco" Begbie (Robert Carlyle))
- The Vow (Jeremy (Scott Speedman))
- Wanderlust (Seth (Justin Theroux))
- X-Men (Scott Summers / Cyclops (James Marsden))
- X2 (Scott Summers / Cyclops (James Marsden))
- X-Men: The Last Stand (Scott Summers / Cyclops (James Marsden))
- White Squall (Dean Preston (Eric Michael Cole))

==== Animation ====
- Brother Bear (Rutt)
- Brother Bear 2 (Rutt)
- Cars (Harv)
- Up (Beta the Rottweiler)
- Rise of the Guardians (Bunny)

== Live action ==
- Kamen Rider W (Doctor Shinkuro Isaka/Weather Dopant)
