= Hideaki Tezuka =

Japanese actor and voice actor

- 手塚 秀彰
- Born: December 5, 1954 (age 71); Tochigi Prefecture, Japan
- Education: Kokugakuin University
- Occupations: Actor; voice actor
- Years active: 1980–present
- Agent: Seinenza Theater Company
- Height: 185 cm (6 ft 1 in)

Hideaki Tezuka (手塚 秀彰, Tezuka Hideaki; born December 5, 1954) is a Japanese actor and voice actor from Tochigi Prefecture. He is affiliated with Seinenza Theater Company. Tezuka is known for his roles in The Last: Naruto the Movie (2014), Chōjin Sentai Jetman (1991) and Naruto Shippûden: Ultimate Ninja Storm 3 (2013).

== Filmography ==
=== Film ===
- Reijo niku-dorei (1985) – Michitarô Ogisu / Servant of the villa
- Itazura Lolita: Ushirokara virgin (1986) – Nishida
- Newaza Gal: Ushirokara Icchokusen (1987) – Gengorô Yano
- Ori no naka no hoshigaru onnatachi (1987) – Hisaya Shibusawa
- Tetsuo II: Body Hammer (1992) – Big Skinhead
- Gekijouban Naruto: Buraddo purizun (2011) – A, The Fourth Raikage (voice)
- Eiga Kureyon Shinchan: Bakauma! B-kyu gurume sabaibaru!! (2013) – Okonomiyaki's Bunta (voice)
- Gekijôban Shingeki no Kyojin Kôhen: Jiyû no tsubasa (2015) – Dallis Zacklay (voice)

=== Television dramas ===
- Chōjin Sentai Jetman (1991, 2 episodes) – Supreme Commander Akira Ichijou
- Kamen Rider Agito (2001) – Doctor
- Aibō (2009) – Inui
- Doubutsu Sentai Zyuohger (2016) – Turtle Man

=== Television animation ===
- In the Beginning: The Bible Stories (1997) – Judah
- Saikano (2002) – Staff A
- Stitch! ~The Mischievous Alien's Great Adventure~ (2009) – Captain Khan
- Heroman (2010) – Tom
- Naruto: Shippuden (2010) – Fourth Raikage Ay
- Attack on Titan (2013) – Dhalis Zachary
- Gargantia on the Verdurous Planet (2013) – Fairlock
- Argevollen (2014) – Chief
- The Pilot's Love Song (2014) – Ameriano
- Pokémon Mega Evolution Act II, III, IV (2014) – Fleur-de-lis (Lysandre)
- Terror in Resonance (2014) – Kurahashi
- Chaika - The Coffin Princess (2014) – Arthur Gaz
- Triage X (2015) – Isoroku Tatara
- Pocket Monsters: XY&Z (2016) – Fleur-de-lis (Lysandre)
- Re:Zero − Starting Life in Another World (2016) – Oni Leader
- Yuri!!! on Ice (2016) – Yakov Feltsman
- The Saga of Tanya the Evil (2017) – Being X
- Attack on Titan Season 3 (2018) – Dhalis Zachary
- Boruto: Naruto Next Generations (2018) – Fourth Raikage Ay
- Yashahime: Princess Half-Demon (2020) – Nikosen
- Attack on Titan Season 4 (2021) – Dhalis Zachary
- Shaman King (2021) – Tao Yúan
- Vinland Saga Season 2 (2023) – Ketil
- Undead Girl Murder Farce (2023) – Phileas Fogg

=== ONA ===
- Ultraman (2023) – Daisuke Arashi

=== OVA ===
- Legend of the Galactic Heroes (1994) – Wiesenhof Hutter
- Mobile Suit Gundam Unicorn (2010) – Suberoa Zinnerman
- Iron Man: Rise of Technovore (2013) – Nick Fury

=== Theatrical animation ===
- Naruto the Movie: Blood Prison (2011) – Fourth Raikage (A)
- Crayon Shin-chan: Very Tasty! B-class Gourmet Survival!! (2013) – Chichipoi
- The Last: Naruto the Movie (2014) – Fourth Raikage (A)
- Mobile Suit Gundam Narrative (2018) – Suberoa Zinnerman

=== Video games ===
- Guilty Gear Xrd -REVELATOR- (2016) – Kum Haehyun
- Legaia 2: Duel Saga (2001) – Straus
- Naruto Shippūden: Gekitō Ninja Taisen! Special (????) – Fourth Raikage (A)
- Naruto Shippuden: Ultimate Ninja Impact (????) – Fourth Raikage (A)
- Naruto Shippuden: Ultimate Ninja Storm Generations (????) – Fourth Raikage (A)
- Naruto Shippuden: Ultimate Ninja Storm 3 (????) – Fourth Raikage (A)
- Naruto Shippuden: Ultimate Ninja Storm Revolution (????) – Fourth Raikage (A)
- Naruto Shippuden: Ultimate Ninja Storm 4 (????) – Fourth Raikage (A)
- CR Mahou Sensei Negima! (2017) – Graf Von Herman
- Final Fantasy VII Remake (2020) – Wymer
- Fullmetal Alchemist Mobile (2022) – Dr. Knox

=== Dubbing ===
==== Live-action ====
- Samuel L. Jackson
  - The Negotiator – Lieutenant Danny Roman
  - Shaft (2000) – John Shaft
  - Unbreakable – Elijah Price
  - Coach Carter – Ken Ray Carter
  - Black Snake Moan – Lazarus Redd
  - Iron Man – Nick Fury
  - Iron Man 2 – Nick Fury
  - Captain America: The First Avenger – Nick Fury
  - Thor – Nick Fury
  - Fury – Foley
  - Reasonable Doubt – Clinton Davis
  - The Legend of Tarzan – George Washington Williams
  - Kong: Skull Island – Preston Packard
  - Glass – Elijah Price / Mr. Glass
  - Shaft (2019) – John Shaft
  - The Last Full Measure – Billy Takoda
  - The Banker – Joe Morris
  - Spiral – Marcus Banks
  - Hitman's Wife's Bodyguard – Darius Kincaid
  - The Protégé – Moody Dutton
- Ving Rhames
  - Out of Sight – Buddy Bragg
  - Mission: Impossible III – Luther Stickell
  - Mission: Impossible – Ghost Protocol – Luther Stickell
  - Mission: Impossible – Rogue Nation – Luther Stickell
  - Mission: Impossible – Fallout – Luther Stickell
  - Mission: Impossible – Dead Reckoning Part One – Luther Stickell
  - Mission: Impossible – The Final Reckoning – Luther Stickell
- Keith David
  - Volcano – Police Lt. Ed Fox
  - Where the Heart Is – Moses Whitecotton
  - Transporter 2 – Stappleton
  - Cloud Atlas – Kupaka / Joe Napier / An-kor Apis / Prescient
- 15 Minutes (2004 NTV edition) – Det. Leon Jackson (Avery Brooks)
- The Affair of the Necklace – Count Cagliostro (Christopher Walken)
- Alien 3 – Leonard Dillon (Charles S. Dutton)
- American Assassin – Stan Hurley (Michael Keaton)
- Armageddon – Charles "Chick" Chappel (Will Patton)
- Backtrace – Agent Franks (Christopher McDonald)
- Beverly Hills Cop III (1997 TV Asashi edition) – Steve Fulbright (Stephen McHattie)
- A Civil Action – Al Love (James Gandolfini)
- Cliffhanger (1997 NTV edition) – Delmar (Craig Fairbrass)
- Cradle 2 the Grave – "Jump" Chambers (Chi McBride)
- Don't Let Go – Bobby Owens (Mykelti Williamson)
- Femme Fatale – Black Tie (Eriq Ebouaney)
- From the Earth to the Moon – David Scott (Brett Cullen)
- Game of Thrones – Eddard "Ned" Stark (Sean Bean)
- The General's Daughter – Colonel George Fowler (Clarence Williams III)
- Heat (1998 TV Asahi edition) – Lieutenant Sammy Casals (Wes Studi)
- In Dreams – Detective Jack Kay (Paul Guilfoyle)
- Incorporated – Julian (Dennis Haysbert)
- The Jacket – Rudy Mackenzie (Daniel Craig)
- King Arthur: Legend of the Sword – Sir Bedivere (Djimon Hounsou)
- L.A.'s Finest – Joseph Vaughn (Ernie Hudson)
- Layer Cake – Morty (George Harris)
- Lilo & Stitch – Cobra Bubbles (Courtney B. Vance)
- Lock, Stock and Two Smoking Barrels – Dog (Frank Harper)
- Lovecraft Country – George Freeman (Courtney B. Vance)
- Mad Max 2 (2015 Supercharger edition) – The Humungus (Kjell Nilsson)
- NYPD Blue – Bobby Simone (Jimmy Smits)
- Our Kind of Traitor – Dima (Stellan Skarsgård)
- Oz – Leo Glynn (Ernie Hudson)
- Planet Terror – Dr. William Block (Josh Brolin)
- Platoon (1998 DVD edition) – Sergeant Warren (Tony Todd), Alpha Company Major (Oliver Stone)
- Rage – O'Connell (Peter Stormare)
- Real Steel – Tak Mashido (Karl Yune)
- Smash – Nick Felder (Thorsten Kaye)
- Starship Troopers 2: Hero of the Federation – Captain V.J. Dax (Richard Burgi)
- Terminator Genisys — Miles Dyson (Courtney B. Vance)
- Thunderbolts* – Gary (Wendell Pierce)
- Training Day – Detective Alonzo Harris (Denzel Washington)
- Transformers: Age of Extinction – Crosshairs
- Wild Things: Foursome – Detective Frank Walker (John Schneider)
- The World Is Not Enough – Valentin Zukovsky (Robbie Coltrane)
- The Yards – Frank Olchin (James Caan)

==== Animation ====
- Avengers Confidential: Black Widow & Punisher – Nick Fury
- Justice League – Despero, Lobo
- Madagascar – Kowalski
- Madagascar: Escape 2 Africa – Kowalski
- Madagascar 3: Europe's Most Wanted – Kowalski
- Penguins of Madagascar – Kowalski
- Seis Manos – El Balde
- Spider-Man – Sergei Kravinoff/Kraven the Hunter
- Spider-Man and His Amazing Friends – Kraven the Hunter
- Superman: The Animated Series – Lobo
