= Bonnie Root =

American actress

- Occupation: Actress
- Years active: 1994–present

Bonnie Root (born 1971 or 1972) is an American actress and film producer. She is known for her recurring role in the hit CBS series Cold Case as ADA Alexandra Thomas and for her starring roles in indie comedy features, such as Coming Soon and In The Weeds and Showtime original The Ranch. More recently, she has turned in leading lady roles in crime thriller Cruel Hearts, dark comedy/horror The Movie and forthcoming psychological thriller, Don't Let Them Out. In her early years she also starred as series regular Amanda McCallister in the NBC John Wells series Trinity and on the daytime soap As the World Turns as the serial killer Eve Coleman Browning. She has also guest-starred and recurred on a variety of popular TV shows, including Blue Bloods, Justified, Pretty Little Liars, Without a Trace, CSI: Crime Scene Investigation and The Mentalist.

== Early years ==
Root is a native of Portland, Oregon. She developed a drinking problem before she was 14 years old, and by age 16 she had voluntarily entered a lock-down rehabilitation program. After rehab she left home and supported herself while finishing high school. Her mother, Jean Banks, owned Vancouver School of Beauty, a salon at which Root worked until she moved to Los Angeles in 1996.

== Filmography ==
=== Film ===
Year	Title	Role	Notes
1996	Eden	Lucy	
1997	Touch Me	Julie	
1999	Coming Soon	Stream Hodsell	
2000	In the Weeds	Becky	
2001	Beyond the Pale	Rhiannon	
2004	Killer Diller	Ladonna	
2005	Don't Tell	Izzy	
2005	Next Exit	Mona	
2007	Rails & Ties	Laura Danner	
2010	Veil	Samantha Hardin	Short
2012	Crow & Arrow	Catherine	Short
2015	Belt Loop Prize		Short
2016	No Way to Live	Bea	
2017	Spare Some Change	Alice	Short
2018	Cruel Hearts	Teri Walker	
2018	Jack and Jill	Commander Gracie	Short
2022	The Movie	Janet	

=== Television ===
Year	Title	Role	Notes
1994	Under Suspicion	Young Girl	"Child Molester: Part 2"
1997	Home Invasion	Willow Patchett	TV film
1997	The Accident: A Moment of Truth Movie	Lizzie	TV film
1997	ER	Lori	"Tribes"
1998	Night Man		"Bad Moon Rising"
1998	Trinity	Amanda McCallister	Main role
1999	The Practice	Jan Carlson	"Marooned"
2000	The Fugitive	Mia Traeger	"Far from Home"
2000	Third Watch	Melanie	"Kim's Hope Chest"
2000	The Fearing Mind	Annabel / Isabel	"Two Faces"
2001	FreakyLinks	Officer Renee Wright	"Subject: Police Siren"
2001	JAG	Lt. Sandy Winters	"Redemption"
2001	Charmed	Susan Coleman	"Black as Cole"
2001	Strong Medicine	Shay Phillips	"Bloodwork"
2002	Dancing at the Harvest Moon	Diane Webber	TV film
2003	Dragnet	Julie Davis	"All That Glitters"
2004	The Ranch	Emily	TV film
2005	Close to Home	Molly	"Pilot"
2006	As the World Turns	Eve Coleman Browning	Guest role (23 episodes)
2006	Vanished	Violet's Mom	"Warm Springs"
2006	Company Town	Agent Shauna Ashfield	TV film
2006–2008	Cold Case	A.D.A. Alexandra Thomas	Recurring role, 6 episodes
2008	Moonlight	Ellen	"Fated to Pretend"
2008	Criminal Minds	Keri Derzmond	"The Crossing"
2008	Crash	Sheriff Emily Mariel	"The Future Is Free"
2009	Without a Trace	Jenny Alden	"Wanted"
2009	Love Takes Wing	Mrs. Pine	TV film
2009	CSI: Crime Scene Investigation	Tonya Charles	"Hog Heaven"
2009	Flower Girl	Victoria Darling	TV film
2009	The Mentalist	Tanya Derask	"Red Badge"
2010	Hawthorne	Valerie Dayton	"The Starting Line"
2010	Law & Order: LA	Maura Dillon	"Echo Park"
2010	The Event	Mary Stern	"Your World to Take"
2012	Justified	Mary Archer	"Cut Ties"
2013	Bones	Haley Kent	"The Spark in the Park"
2014	Perception	FBI Agent Nina Curtis	"Silence"
2015	Pretty Little Liars	Lawyer	"Songs of Innocence"
2015	Wicked City	Pam	"Destroyer"
2016	Blue Bloods	Kathy Elliot	"Town Without Pity"
