= Local Heroes (American TV series) =

- Genre: television comedy
- Created by: Frank Mula
- Starring: Ken Hudson Campbell; Kristin Dattilo; Louis Ferreira; Jason Kristofer; Jay Mohr
- Country of origin: United States
- Original language: English
- No. of seasons: 1
- No. of episodes: 7

Production
- Executive producers: Frank Mula; Paul Junger Witt; Tony Thomas; Gary S. Levine
- Running time: 22 minutes
- Production companies: Witt/Thomas Productions; No Humans Were Harmed Productions; Warner Bros Television

Original release
- Network: Fox
- Release: March 17 – April 28, 1996

Local Heroes is an American comedy television series created by Frank Mula. The series stars Ken Hudson Campbell, Kristin Dattilo, Louis Ferreira, Jason Kristofer and Jay Mohr. The series aired on Fox from March 17, 1996, to April 28, 1996.

== Cast ==
- Ken Hudson Campbell as Eddie Trakacs
- Kristin Dattilo as Bonnie
- Louis Ferreira as Mert
- Jason Kristofer as 'Stosh' Stoskolowski
- Jay Mohr as Jake Bartholomew
- Theo Nicholas Pagones as Dimitri
- Hope Allen as Elise Isadora
- Paula Cale as Gloria
- Tricia Vessey as Nikki

== Episodes ==
No.	Title	Directed by	Written by	Original release date	Prod. code
1	"Hometown Heroes"	Jeff Melman	Frank Mula	March 17, 1996	001
2	"Big Bad Stosh"	Ted Wass	Regina Stewart	March 24, 1996	002
3	"Mester Meister"	Ted Wass	David Richardson & Regina Stewart	March 31, 1996	004
4	"Not the Booth Who Shot Lincoln"	Ted Wass	David Richardson	April 7, 1996	005
5	"Unfriendly Skies"	Ted Wass	Marc Abrams & Mike Benson	April 14, 1996	006
6	"The Birds and the Beers"	Ted Wass	Brian Scully	April 21, 1996	007
7	"Eddie's Secret"	Ted Wass	Frank Mula	April 28, 1996	003
