= Baby Bob =

American sitcom

- Series premiere print advertisement
- Genre: Sitcom
- Created by: Michael Saltzman
- Written by: Steve Baldikoski; Bryan Behar; Jared Bush; Norm Gunzenhauser; Stephen Lloyd; Tom Palmer; Michael Saltzman; Dan Signer
- Directed by: Rob Schiller; John Fortenberry; Robby Benson
- Starring: Adam Arkin; Joely Fisher; Holland Taylor; Elliott Gould
- Voices of: Ken Hudson Campbell
- Composer: Jon Ehrlich
- Country of origin: United States
- Original language: English
- No. of seasons: 2
- No. of episodes: 14 (5 unaired)

Production
- Executive producer: Michael Saltzman
- Producers: Steve Baldikoski; Bryan Behar; Stephen C. Grossman
- Cinematography: Ron Vargas
- Editors: Skip Collector; Tucker Wiard; Michael Wilcox
- Running time: 30 minutes
- Production companies: Scribbler's Pillory Productions; Viacom Productions

Original release
- Network: CBS
- Release: March 18, 2002 – June 20, 2003

Baby Bob is an American sitcom television series that premiered on CBS as a midseason replacement on March 18, 2002, and aired two seasons through June 20, 2003. The Baby Bob character had previously been on television since February 2000, appearing in commercials for FreeInternet.com. While actual infants played Bob, the effect to make him look like he was talking was achieved through computer editing.

== Synopsis ==
The series centered on first-time parents Walter Spencer (Adam Arkin) and his wife Lizzy (Joely Fisher), and their six-month-old baby Bob (voiced by Ken Hudson Campbell). After discovering that their son can talk like an adult, Walter decides that they must keep it a secret. Lizzy, however, wants to show off Bob's talking skills, especially to her mother Madeline (Holland Taylor), who constantly brags about her other grandchildren. Supporting cast members included Elliott Gould as Walter's father Sam, and Marissa Tait as Bob's babysitter Teala.

== Cast ==
- Joely Fisher as Lizzy Collins Spencer
- Adam Arkin as Walter Spencer
- Holland Taylor as Madeline Collins
- Elliott Gould as Sam Spencer
- Ken Hudson Campbell as the voice of Bob Spencer
- Marissa Tait as Teala

== Episodes ==
=== Series overview ===
| Season | Episodes | Originally released | |
| Season | Episodes | First released | Last released |
|---|---|---|---|
| 1 | 6 | March 18, 2002 | April 22, 2002 |
| 2 | 8 | June 6, 2003 | June 20, 2003 |

=== Season 1 (2002) ===
| No. overall | No. in season | Title | Directed by | Written by | Original release date | Prod. code | US viewers (millions) |
|---|---|---|---|---|---|---|---|
| 1 | 1 | "First Words" | Rob Schiller | Michael Saltzman | March 18, 2002 | 001 | 15.62 |
| 2 | 2 | "Mommy & Me" | John Fortenberry | Norm Gunzenhauser | March 25, 2002 | 002 | 14.18 |
| 3 | 3 | "The Tell-Tale Art" | Rob Schiller | Stephen Lloyd | April 1, 2002 | 003 | 12.92 |
| 4 | 4 | "The Other Side" | John Fortenberry | Michael Saltzman | April 8, 2002 | 004 | 12.90 |
| 5 | 5 | "House of the Rising Son" | Rob Schiller | Tom Palmer | April 15, 2002 | 005 | 10.71 |
| 6 | 6 | "Talking Babies Say the Darndest Things" | John Fortenberry | Bryan Behar & Steve Baldikoski | April 22, 2002 | 006 | 10.82 |

=== Season 2 (2003) ===
| No. overall | No. in season | Title | Directed by | Written by | Original release date | Prod. code | US viewers (millions) |
|---|---|---|---|---|---|---|---|
| 7 | 1 | "Rush Lim-Bob" | Rob Schiller | Dan Singer | June 6, 2003 | 013 | 6.00 |
| 8 | 2 | "Don't Pass Me By" | John Fortenberry | Michael Saltzman | June 13, 2003 | 008 | 5.13 |
| 9 | 3 | "Reality Bites" | Rob Schiller | Norm Gunzenhauser | June 20, 2003 | TBA | 4.64 |
| 10 | 4 | "Footloose, Infancy Free" | N/A | N/A | Unaired | TBA | N/A |
| 11 | 5 | "Boys Will Be Girls" | N/A | N/A | Unaired | 009 | N/A |
| 12 | 6 | "You Don't Know Jack" | N/A | N/A | Unaired | 011 | N/A |
| 13 | 7 | "Vegas Baby" | N/A | N/A | Unaired | 012 | N/A |
| 14 | 8 | "Let's Go to the Videotape" | N/A | N/A | Unaired | 014 | N/A |

== Reception and cancellation ==
Baby Bob as Quiznos' television pitchman

The series was panned by critics but premiered to strong ratings and placed 15th in its first week. Baby Bob wrapped its first season, consisting of six episodes, in April 2002 with CBS planning a second season of thirteen episodes. However, CBS decided to shift its programming budget to its new series My Big Fat Greek Life and cut the second season order for Baby Bob to eight episodes. The second season of Baby Bob remained unaired for over a year until CBS aired the episodes in summer 2003.

After the show's run ended, the Baby Bob character returned to television in a series of commercials for Quiznos.

In 2002, TV Guide ranked Baby Bob number 14 on its '50 Worst TV Shows of All Time' list.
