= Coming Soon (1999 film) =

1999 film directed by Colette Burson

- DVD cover
- Directed by: Colette Burson
- Written by: Colette Burson; Kate Robin
- Produced by: Keven Duffy; Beau Flynn; Stefan Simchowitz
- Starring: Bonnie Root; Gaby Hoffmann; Tricia Vessey; Ryan Reynolds; Yasmine Bleeth; Mia Farrow
- Cinematography: Joaquín Baca-Asay
- Edited by: Norman Buckley
- Music by: Christophe Beck
- Production companies: Bandeira Entertainment; Key Productions
- Distributed by: Unapix Entertainment Productions
- Release dates: April 17, 1999 (LA Film Fest); May 12, 2000 (United States)
- Running time: 96 minutes
- Country: United States
- Language: English
- Box office: $5,453

Coming Soon is a 1999 American sex comedy film directed by Colette Burson and written by Burson and Kate Robin. It stars Bonnie Root, Gaby Hoffmann, Tricia Vessey and Ryan Reynolds. The plot centers on three seniors at a Manhattan prep school and their search for sexual satisfaction. It has been described as a female-centric American Pie. It marked Ashton Kutcher's film debut.

The film premiered at the LA Film Festival on April 17, 1999. On the festival circuit, the film was received with enthusiasm by female audiences. Though it contained no nudity or violence, the film was given an NC-17 rating by the MPAA. To achieve an R rating needed for commercial release, Burson made cuts and edits. Though multiple Hollywood studios expressed interest in releasing the recut film, they ultimately passed. The film found distribution with Unapix Entertainment Productions, who gave it a limited theatrical release beginning on May 12, 2000. It thereafter received a direct-to-video release on September 12, 2000.

== Plot ==
Three wealthy, savvy high school seniors have everything: brains, beauty, money, popularity, powerful parents, and boyfriends. Stream Hodsell is a smart, down-to-earth strawberry blonde. Sassy Jenny Simon masks her intelligence behind a guise of fishnet stockings. Nell Kellner is soulful. The girls attend the prestigious and expensive Halton School in Manhattan.

After losing her virginity to Chad without obtaining sexual satisfaction, Stream is confused, as is it was not as amazing as she expected it to be. Jenny and Nell assure her it will improve over time, so she keeps trying. Jennifer's mom tells them that many women suffer from rarely climaxing. So, determined to feel fulfilled, Stream literally studies the problem with self-help books, women's magazines and the comically misinformed advice of her peers.

One evening, alone with Chad, Stream tries to bring up her lack of fulfillment with the sex. However, he says he loves her, then pushes her head down so she'll perform fellatio on him. Meanwhile, Jenny is having kinky sex with Louie and Nell coolly dissuades her friend Petrus when he brings sex up.

Judy Hodsell is Stream's distracted ex-hippie mom, who's dating a white South African artist. She complains about the difficulties she has with Stream's father Dick Hodsell, a yuppie she divorced two years ago, who has a new young girlfriend, Mimi.

At her second sitting of the SAT, Stream chats with garage band musician Henry Lipschitz Rockefeller before Chad pulls her away. After they dine out, Chad gives her ecstasy, which stimulates her more. Believing she finally has had an orgasm, Stream tells Jenny her news, but moments later she has her first from one of the Jacuzzi jets.

Shortly after, all three girls end up breaking up. Stream tells Chad he has never given her an orgasm, Louie tells Jenny they lack a deeper connection, and Nell has difficulty even just kissing Petrus. The trio goes out to an expensive bar in hopes of meeting more worldly guys, and Nell gets recruited by a modeling agency.

When the trio hear back from their early admission applications, only Nell gets accepted, to Yale. Stream is disappointed, so Judy calls Mr. Jennings, her feel-good career counselor. Encouraging her to support Stream, she goes into her room and is upset to find a strip of condoms, finally signing her up to see a psychiatrist.

Both Stream and Jenny place personal ads in the paper. Stream's contact is unsuccessful at getting her to climax and Jenny's doesn't even show. At Nell's second photo shoot, the male photographer hits on her and she leaves, disgusted. Shortly thereafter, Nell calls the others as she's swallowed the rest of her Prozac prescription, but there were only three. After seeing an ad for Henry's band on TV, Stream convinces the trio to go to the gig. The song he has written is obviously about her. Nell stays behind to meet the female drummer, and confides to the others the next day she finally had an orgasm thanks to her.

Both Stream and Jenny get into Harvard and Brown, respectively. Nell, however, decides to not go to Yale after all. Stream approaches Henry, who has been accepted into both Yale and Harvard. Asking him out, he accepts with a kiss. When she later asks why he hadn't kissed her when asked at New Year's, it's because they didn't know each other. Finally both climax together, as they share feelings for each other.

== Cast ==
- Bonnie Root as Stream Hodsell
- Gaby Hoffmann as Jenny Simon
- Tricia Vessey as Nell Kellner
- Ryan Reynolds as Henry Rockefeller Lipschitz
- Yasmine Bleeth as Mimi
- Mia Farrow as Judy Hodsell
- Ryan O'Neal as Dick
- James Roday Rodriguez as Chad
- Spalding Gray as Mr. Jennings
- Peter Bogdanovich as Bartholomew
- Bridget Barkan as Polly
- Ramsey Faragallah as Wahid
- Jared Ryan as Petrus
- Ashton Kutcher as Louie
- James McCaffrey as Dante
- Victor Argo as Mr. Neipris
- Tim Cunningham as Dr. Frank

== Release and rating ==
The film had its premiere at the LA Film Festival on April 17, 1999. It also screened at the Seattle International Film Festival and was shown as the closing night film at the Nantucket Film Festival.

The film received an NC-17 rating from the Motion Picture Association of America. Said Burson, "The woman at the MPAA Board explained the 17 cuts and the initial rating as based on American parents' standards. She said that they judge girls' sexuality differently from boys' and as they have this double standard, they would have found Coming Soon unacceptable as it was. I was made to understand that they didn't like a girl having an orgasm on screen", referring to one of the film's set pieces where Stream has an orgasm in a Jacuzzi. Though the scene features no nudity, Burson "was told [the scene] was too lurid."

To secure an R rating, Burson made cuts to the film, particularly to the raunchy dialogue. Multiple film studios, including Fox 2000 Pictures, still declined to release the recut film. The film's distribution struggles sparked an outcry from journalists and critics, who criticized the MPAA's double standards as films such as American Pie and 8mm were able to secure R ratings with more ease. Coming Soon ultimately found distribution with smaller company Unapix Entertainment Productions. Burson said the film's official website contributed to the eventual sale, recalling, "These young girls took me out to lunch and said, 'we love your movie and we're gonna help you get distribution.'" The film opened in a single New York City theater on May 12, 2000, for a one-week run. It was also shown at Laemmle's Sunset 5 theater in LA that June 16. It was released to DVD on September 12, 2000. On April 10, 2007, Burson's original cut of the film was released on DVD by Lionsgate Home Entertainment.

== Reception ==
On review aggregator website Rotten Tomatoes, it has a 38% score based on 8 reviews, with an average rating of 4.5/10. Metacritic reports a 44 out of 100 rating based on 7 reviews, indicating "mixed or average" reviews.

The New York Times' A.O. Scott gave a positive review in which he said the film "explores two phenomena that have inspired countless magazine articles and how-to guides, as well as widespread anxiety and fascination: the female orgasm and the Ivy League admissions process". He likened the film to "a collaboration between John Hughes and Whit Stillman in close consultation with the editors of Our Bodies, Our Selves", and praised Gaby Hoffmann as the Madeline Kahn of her generation. He added: "While Coming Soon takes up the cause of a later generation, it recalls the salutary candor of the 70's about sexuality, especially female sexuality. Its frank good humor stands in sharp contrast with the strange combination of timidity and exploitiveness of more widely distributed recent teenage comedies like Down to You, Whatever It Takes and Committed, which can't decide whether young women's sexual desires should be punished or ridiculed -- if they are even allowed to exist."

In the Observer, Andrew Sarris wrote, "In fact, Coming Soon, with its orgasmic double-entendre locked into the title, is closer to being a French film than a cautionary and sanitized Hollywood approach to the subject. Ms. Burson's view of sex is cheeky, but never gross, and kids may have trouble appreciating the epiphany of Stream’s final close-up during her climactic sexual fulfillment."

Variety called it "a moderately entertaining coming-of-age trifle" and said Vessey "brings intelligence and warmth to her part". TV Guide was less positive and criticized the film's pacing, though it said "the film's full of ugly truths that are never too early for teen girls to learn about the male of the species."
