= Seinenza Theater Company =

Japanese theatre company

The Seinenza Theater Company (劇団青年座, Gekidan Seinenza) is a Japanese theatre company located in Shibuya, Tokyo. It was founded on December 17, 1954, and stages Shingeki plays. Many of its actors have gone on to become voice actors for anime productions.

== Notable members ==
=== Male ===
- Masuo Amada
- Katsumi Chō
- Nobuaki Fukuda
- Takaya Hashi
- Shūichirō Idemitsu
- Akira Igarashi
- Kenjirō Ishimaru
- Shirō Ishimoda
- Hiroshi Iwasaki
- Ryō Kamon
- Ippei Kanie
- Kenichi Katō
- Takuya Kirimoto
- Masahiro Kobayashi
- Kenji Kodama
- Shōji Ōki
- Masaru Shinodzuka
- Hideaki Tezuka
- Masane Tsukayama
- Takumi Tsutsui
- Kihachirō Uemura
- Kazuhiro Yamaji
- Ryūji Yamamoto
- Fubito Yamano
- Hiroshi Yanaka
- Etsuo Yokobori
- Makoto Yuasa

=== Female ===
- Emiko Azuma
- Kayoko Fujii
- Ryōko Gi
- Narumi Hidaka
- Miwa Ikezaki
- Yoshimi Iwasaki
- Akiko Izumi
- Tomie Kataoka
- Kazuko Katō
- Sayaka Kobayashi
- Yōko Koyanagi
- Shizue Masuko
- Kaori Matsunaga
- Tomoko Miyadera
- Yōko Motai
- Non Nonomura
- Yukari Nozawa
- Atsuko Takahata
- Futami Uesugi

== Former members ==
- Jūkei Fujioka (deceased)
- Kōe Hatsui (deceased)
- Tomoyuki Dan (deceased)
- Manabu Ino
- Daisuke Koshikawa
- Gin Moritsuka (deceased)
- Mosahiko Naruse
- Toshiyuki Nishida
- Naoto Ogata
- Sumi Shimamoto
- Kōsuke Suzuki
- Naoto Takenaka
- Hideyuki Tanaka
- Hisano Yamaoka (deceased)
- Yō Yoshimura (deceased)
