= Wonder Park =

2019 animated film

- Theatrical release poster
- Directed by: Dylan Brown (Note: Brown was fired near the end of production; David Feiss, Robert Iscove and Clare Kilner were subsequently brought in to finish the film. In the end, Paramount Pictures and Nickelodeon Movies decided not to include a director's credit in the completed film.) (uncredited)
- Screenplay by: Josh Appelbaum; André Nemec
- Story by: Robert Gordon; Josh Appelbaum; André Nemec
- Produced by: Josh Appelbaum; André Nemec; Kendra Haaland
- Starring: Jennifer Garner; Matthew Broderick; John Oliver; Mila Kunis; Kenan Thompson; Ken Jeong; Norbert Leo Butz; Brianna Denski; Ken Hudson Campbell
- Cinematography: Juan García González
- Edited by: Edie Ichioka
- Music by: Steven Price
- Production companies: Paramount Animation; Nickelodeon Movies; Ilion Animation Studios
- Distributed by: Paramount Pictures
- Release dates: March 15, 2019 (United States); April 12, 2019 (Spain)
- Running time: 85 minutes
- Countries: Spain; United States
- Language: English
- Budget: $80–100 million
- Box office: $123.7 million

Wonder Park is a 2019 animated fantasy adventure comedy-drama film written by Josh Appelbaum and André Nemec, about a young girl who encounters a real version of her magical amusement park run by anthropomorphic animals. The film features the voices of Jennifer Garner, Matthew Broderick, John Oliver, Mila Kunis, Kenan Thompson, Ken Jeong, Norbert Leo Butz, Brianna Denski, and Ken Hudson Campbell. Produced by Paramount Animation, Nickelodeon Movies, and Ilion Animation Studios, with animation provided by Ilion.

The film was directed by Dylan Brown. While he was involved through most of the production period, Paramount dismissed him in January 2018, citing "inappropriate and unwanted conduct". As a result, a director's credit is not included in the final film.

Wonder Park was released in the United States on March 15, 2019, by Paramount Pictures. The film received mixed reviews from critics, and was a commercial failure, grossing $123 million against a budget of $80–100 million.

== Plot ==
June Bailey, a young imaginative girl, dreams up Wonderland with her mother—a magical amusement park run by quirky anthropomorphic animals: Boomer, a big blue bear who welcomes guests; Greta, a wild boar; Gus and Cooper, beaver brothers; Steve, a porcupine safety manager secretly in love with Greta; and Peanut, a chimpanzee leader who can create rides by hearing June’s mother’s voice. When her mother falls ill and leaves for recovery, June grows distant from Wonderland and burns its blueprints in frustration.

Later, her father sends her to math camp. Misreading a note from him as a plea for help, June enlists her friend Banky to cause a bus distraction so she can return home. Instead, she discovers a real, dilapidated Wonderland hidden in the woods, surrounded by a menacing cloud called the Darkness. She and the animals try to repair the Clockwork Swings, the park’s key mechanism, but are attacked by Chimpanzombies—former plush toys now serving the Darkness. Amid the chaos, June is separated and ends up in Zero-G Land, where she finds Peanut hiding. He admits feeling lost without the voice in his head, prompting June to realize the Darkness stems from her own cynicism over her mother’s illness. The Chimpanzombies capture Peanut, but June manages to escape.

June rushes back to the animals to tell them she’s found Peanut, but also admits she’s the one who caused the Darkness. Hurt by the confession, they abandon her. Spotting a piece of the blueprint and realizing she’s been creating the park’s ideas herself, June repairs one of the attractions to catch up with the animals and reach Clockwork Swings. She explains why she created the Darkness, and when the animals see she truly wants to help, they regroup to save Peanut and Wonderland.

They find the Chimpanzombies taking Peanut toward the Darkness. The animals fight back while June dives into the void to rescue him. She promises to be the voice of his imagination and urges him not to let the Darkness win, inspiring him to make a slide from bendy straws to escape. As they ride the slide to evade the Chimpanzombies, June notices Clockwork Swings is tied to her name written in cursive, just like the blueprint piece. With Peanut’s help, they restart Clockwork Swings using her name to move the gears, clearing the Darkness from Wonderland. A lingering aurora remains, which June sees as a reminder to keep imagining.

June returns home to her now-recovered mother, and together they build a Wonderland in their backyard. She then shares the story of Wonderland with other kids.

== Voice cast ==
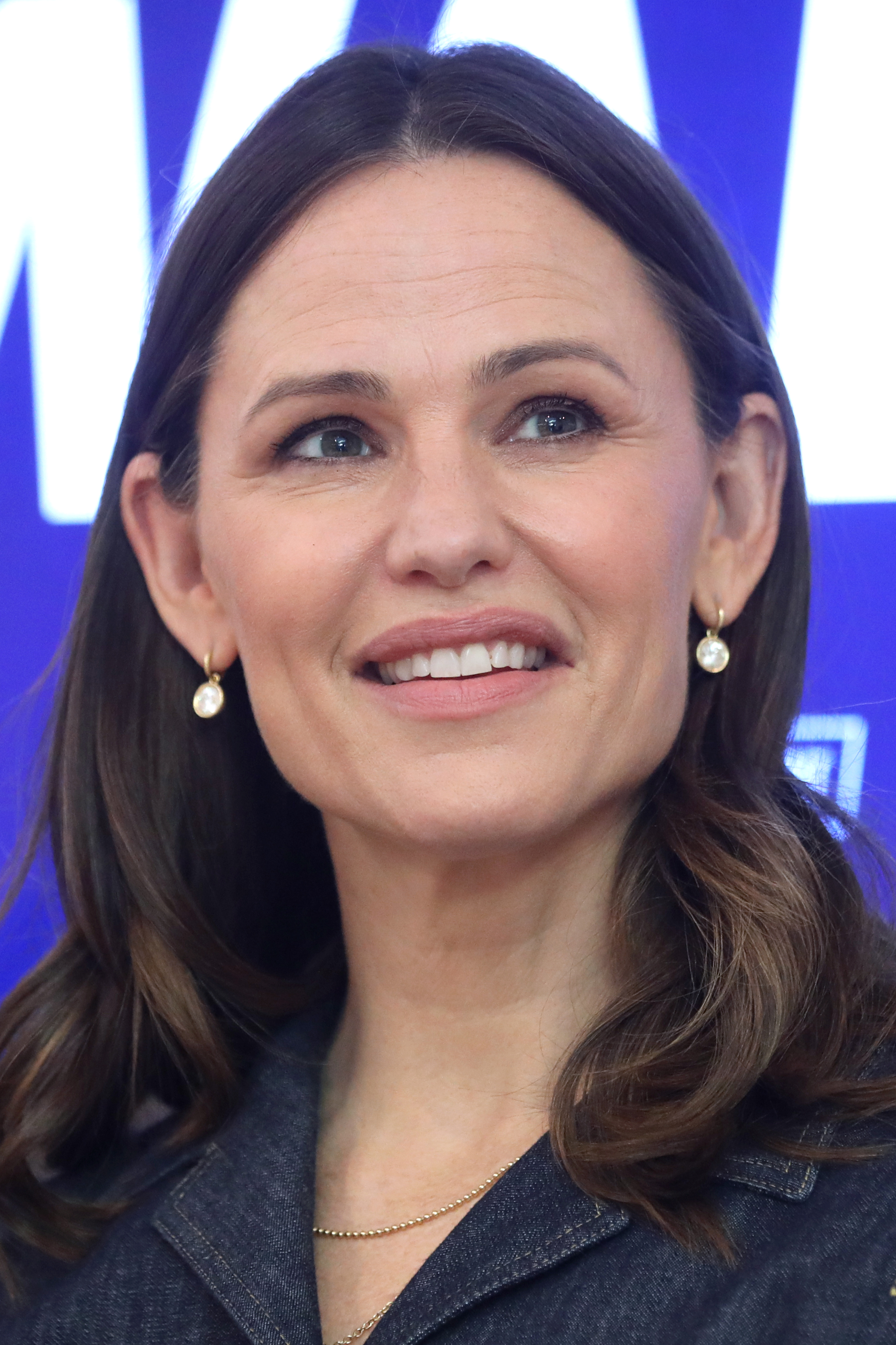
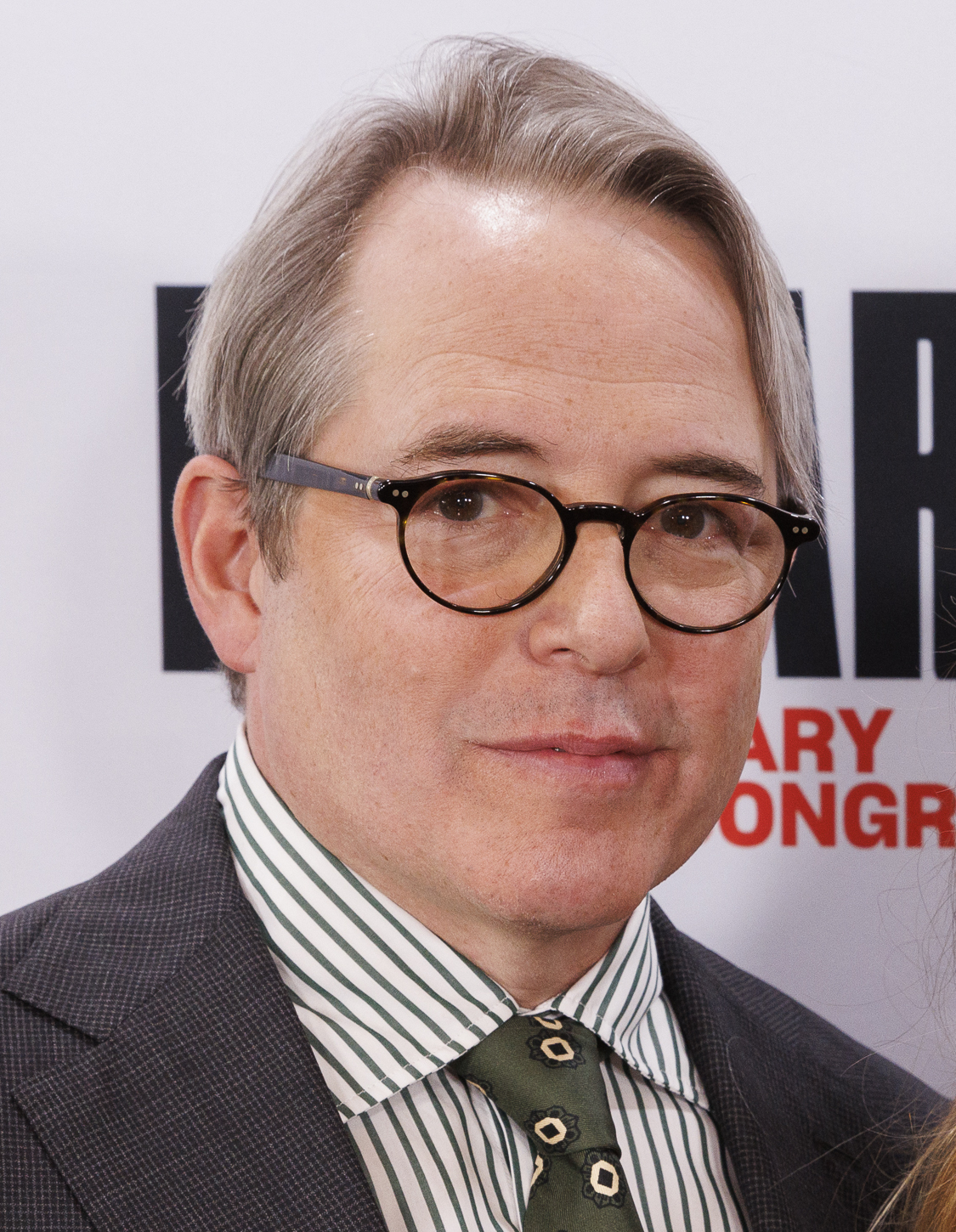
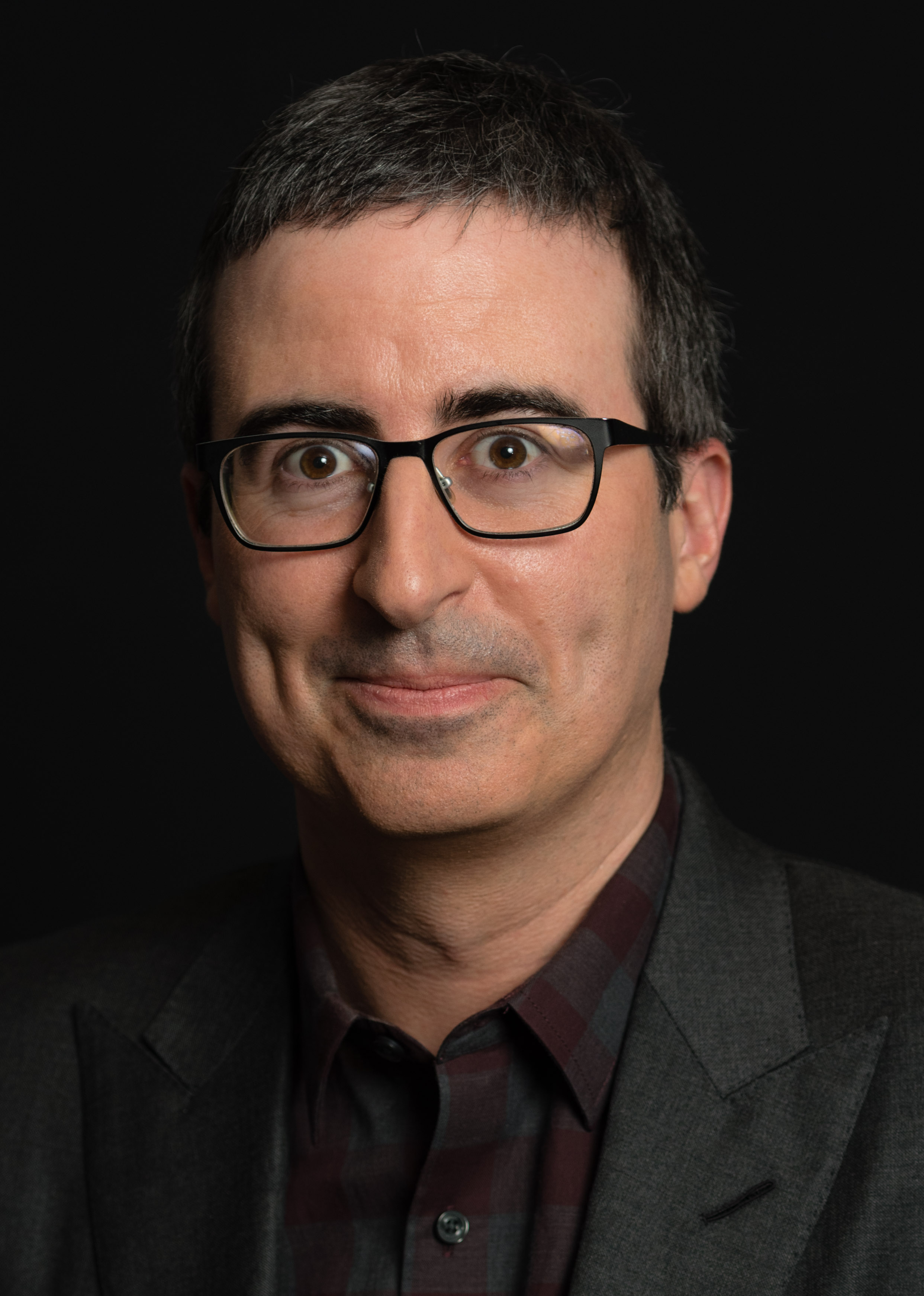
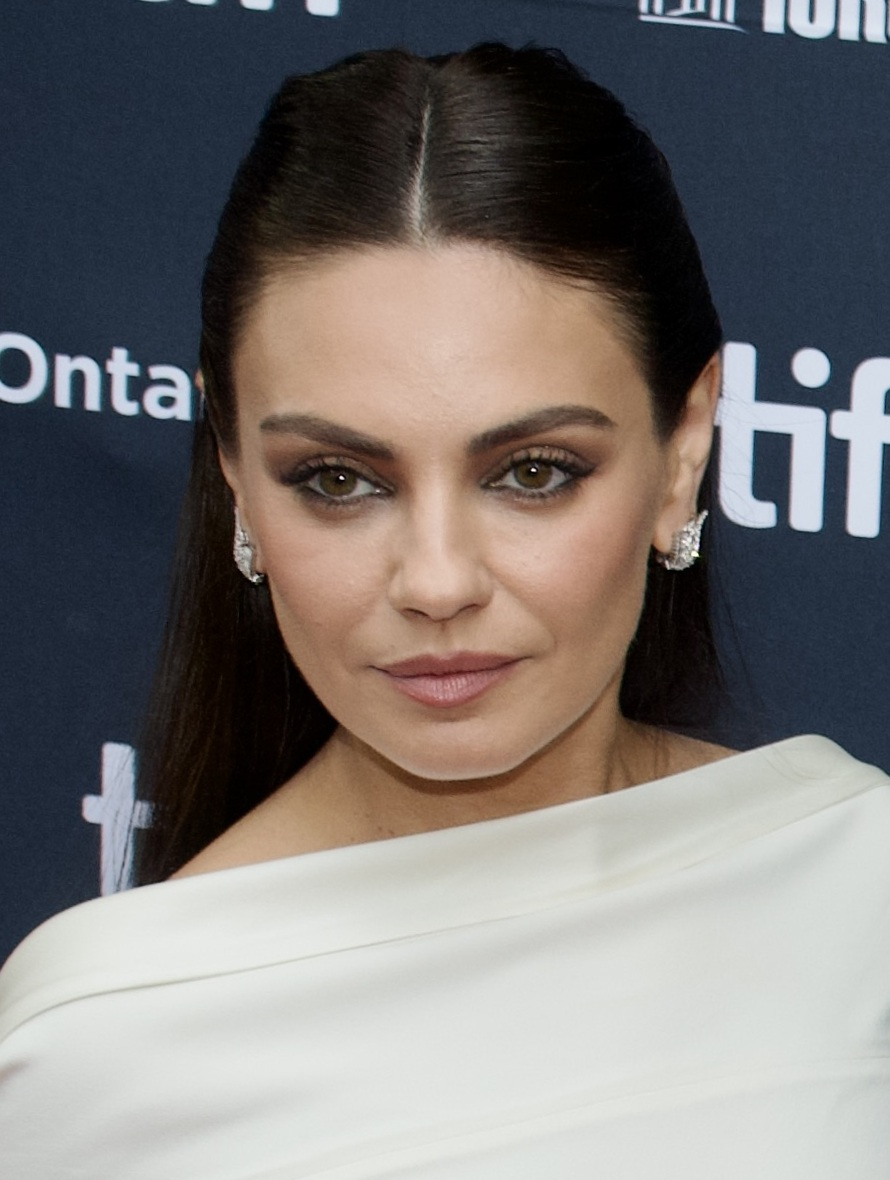
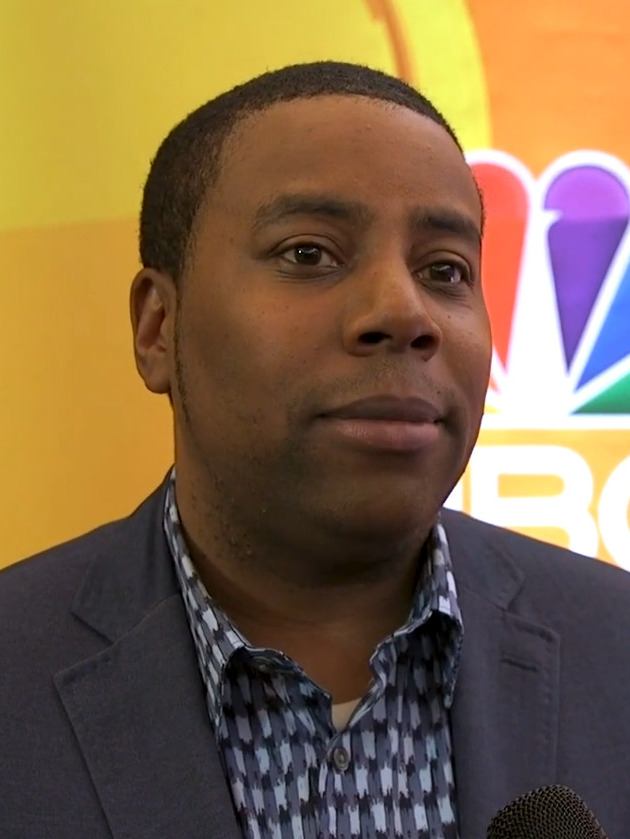
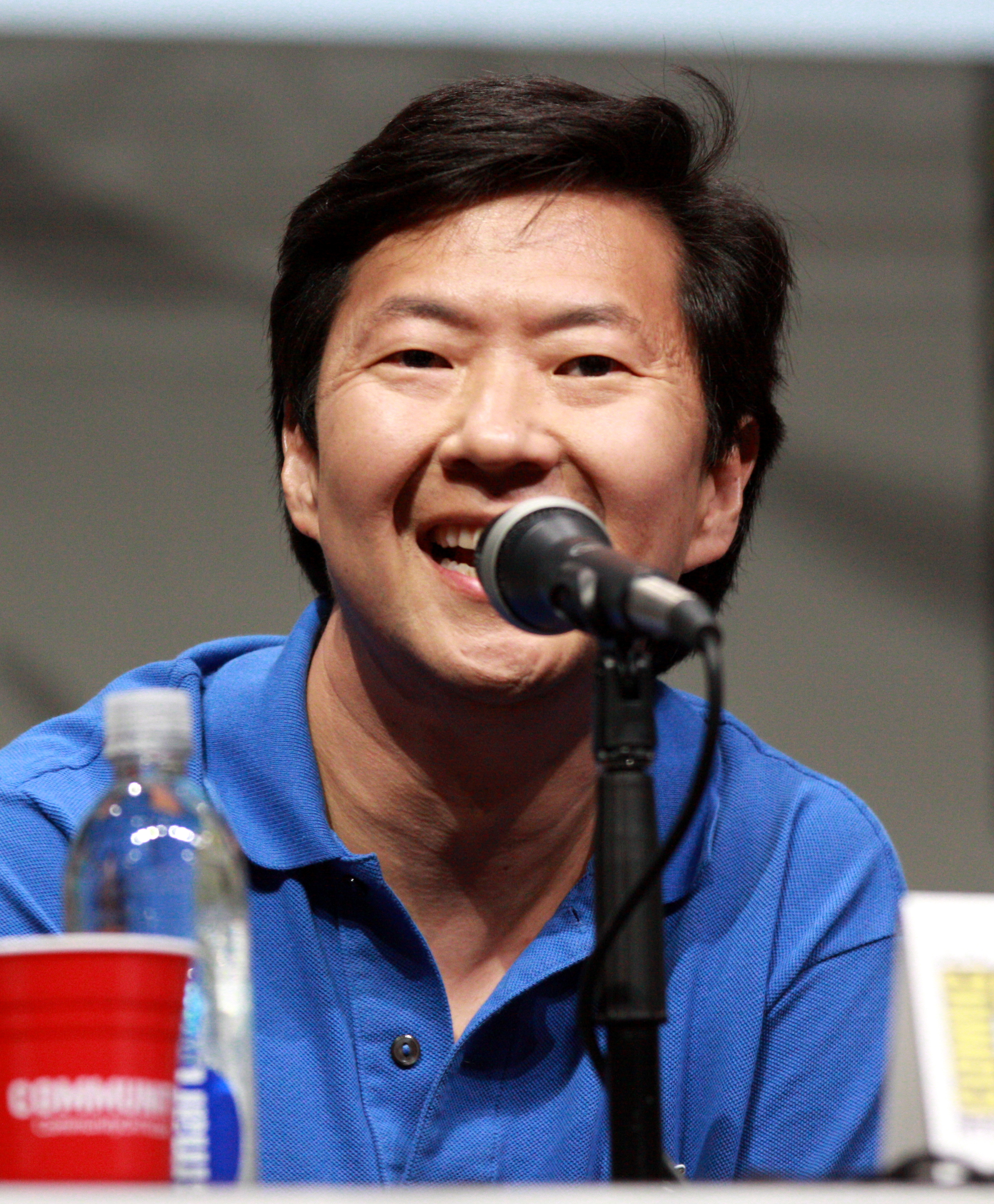
Jennifer Garner (pictured in 2024), Matthew Broderick (2022), John Oliver (2016), Mila Kunis (2025), Kenan Thompson (2019) and Ken Jeong (2013)
- Brianna Denski as June Bailey, an imaginative and optimistic girl who created Wonderland
  - Sofia Mali as Young June
- Jennifer Garner as June's mother
- Matthew Broderick as June's father
- John Oliver as Steve, a white porcupine who is the safety officer of Wonderland
- Mila Kunis as Greta, a wild boar who is Steve's love interest
- Kenan Thompson as Gus, an orange beaver who is Cooper's brother
  - Ryan Fitzgerald voices Gus in the Australian version and Joe Sugg in the UK version
- Ken Jeong as Cooper, a red beaver who is Gus' brother
  - Wippa voices Cooper in the Australian version and Caspar Lee in the UK version
- Norbert Leo Butz as Peanut, a chimpanzee who acts as Wonderland's main mascot and ride creator
- Ken Hudson Campbell as Boomer, a narcoleptic blue bear who welcomes the visitors to Wonderland
  - Tom Baker voices Boomer in the UK version
- Oev Michael Urbas as Banky, June's best friend
- Kevin Chamberlin as Uncle Tony, June's father's brother-in-law
  - Eamonn Holmes voices Uncle Tony in the UK version
- Kate McGregor-Stewart as Aunt Albertine, June's father's older sister
  - Ruth Langsford voices Aunt Albertine in the UK version
- Kath Soucie as Bus Counselor Shannon

Emma Shannon, Gabriella Graves, Meilee Condron, ViviAnn Yee, Andreana Weiner, Barbara Iley, Nora Wyman, Catherine Cavadini, Regina Taufen, Evan Kishiyama, Andre Robinson, Logan Kishi, Tucker Chandler, Will Collyer, Carlos Moreno, Jr., Daniel Mora, David Arnott, and John DeMita provided additional voices via ADR group; Cavadini voices a neighbor, and DeMita voices a police officer.

== Production ==
Wonder Park started development in early 2012, with the story being written by Galaxy Quest and Lemony Snicket's A Series of Unfortunate Events writer Robert Gordon and production commenced in September 2014. In June 2015, it was revealed that Spain's Ilion Animation Studios would produce the film. (Note: Animators and artists working on the film included Steven E. Gordon, Jorgen Klubien, Donna Lee, Won Sul Hyun, Joan Berenguer, Betsy Bauer, Toni Reyna, Danielle Powers, Maddie Taylor, Ravinder Kundi, Ander Liza, Jorge Sanchez Salcedo, Chris Schnabel, Natalie Franscioni-Karp, Paula Benedicto, Marta del Valle Canencia, Alfonso Especo, Esther Encabo, Dalia Gutierrez Aranda, Ricard Miras Bellavista, Euardo Quintana, Roberto Rubio Corral, Mauro E. Lopez, Juan Cassle, Didac Ruiz, Juan Diego Zapata, Pedro Daniel García Pérez, Jenny Lerew, Luis Velasco, Jordi Solanes, Arnau Ollé López, Alvaro Granados, Nathan Fowkes, Jose Vicente de María Martínez, Victor Perez, Alfonso Badia, Christian Dan Benjarano Sanchez, Laure Petrini, Jesus Merino, Alex Mateo, Alberto Montalvá Garcia, Florian Pollet, Jessica Grembowski, and Matt Burniston.) Storyboard artist Jorgen Klubien's idea for the story was for it to focus on June Bailey and Peanut, who he described as "an embittered old has-been park mascot, now a fully grown chimpanzee". According to writer and producer André Nemec, the filmmakers were inspired by their childhood memories to create the park (which was to be built out of found objects and scaled up to full size in the film) and build its rides, and went to actual amusement parks as research to accurately capture the feeling of how they were designed and being at one.

In November 2015, Paramount Animation officially announced the project, then titled Amusement Park, with former Pixar animator Dylan Brown directing. According to storyboard artist Donna Lee, Brown would instruct her and the other storyboard artists to copy shots from Pixar's films. The voices in the film were set as Matthew Broderick, Jennifer Garner, Ken Hudson Campbell (originally Jeffrey Tambor), Kenan Thompson, Ken Jeong, Mila Kunis, and John Oliver. For the lead role of June Bailey, the filmmakers wanted an unknown actress for the part. More than 1,500 people from all over the US and the world auditioned before 11-year-old Brianna Denski from Terryville, Connecticut was offered the role. A raccoon character named Bandit was planned to appear as a main character, but was cut from the final film.

The film's sound design, editing and pre-mixing was done by John Marquis and his team (consisting of Diego Perez, Emma Present, Michele Perrone and Jonathan Klein) at E² Sound, starting in January 2017 and lasting for 17 months. The team was given time to refine the audio, and had multiple previews for test audiences. Two of the previews had a temporary music score, while another two had mockups of the final score composed by Steven Price. The final mix was completed at Technicolor's Stage 1, overseen by Anna Behlmer and Terry Porter, who were re-recording mixers for the sound effects and dialogue/music, respectively.

In January 2018, it was reported that Brown was fired from the production by Paramount Pictures, following an investigation into complaints of "inappropriate and unwanted conduct". The film was nearly complete at the time of Brown's firing. Paramount offered the director's credit to multiple key creative personnel on the film, but they refused, fearing the film would be detrimental to their careers. David Feiss, Robert Iscove and Clare Kilner were brought in to finish the film, but the position would go uncredited in the film. (Note: The name "Alan Smithee", formerly sometimes used in such situations, was discontinued by the Directors Guild of America in 2000.) In April 2018, the title of the film was changed from Amusement Park to Wonder Park.

== Music ==
The music for Wonder Park was scored by composer Steven Price. The album was released on March 8, 2019, a week before the film was released into theatres.

Grace VanderWaal recorded the song "Hideaway" for the film.

In April 2018, it was reported that Rachel Platten would perform an original song for Wonder Park. The single, titled "Wonder", was released in March 2019.

== Release ==
Wonder Park was released on March 15, 2019, by Paramount Pictures. In January 2017, the film was moved up from its original release date, March 22, 2019, to July 13, 2018. A few months later, it was pushed back from July 13, 2018, to August 10, 2018, and by August 2017, it was pushed back for a final time to March 15, 2019.

=== Home media ===
Wonder Park was released on DVD and Blu-ray on June 18, 2019, and on Digital HD on June 4, by Paramount Home Entertainment.

== Reception ==
=== Box office ===
Wonder Park grossed $45.2 million in the United States and Canada, and $78.4 million in other territories, for a worldwide total of $123.7 million, against a production budget of around $80–100 million.

In the United States and Canada, Wonder Park was released alongside Captive State and Five Feet Apart, and was projected to gross $8–14 million from 3,838 theaters in its opening weekend. It made $5.4 million on its first day, including $700,000 from Thursday night previews. It went on to debut to $16 million, which beat projections, though Deadline Hollywood said it was "[not] enough to consider this... production a success." The film fell 45% in its second weekend, grossing $8.8 million, and 43% in its third to $5.0 million.

=== Critical response ===
On review aggregator website Rotten Tomatoes, the film holds an approval rating of 35% based on 107 reviews, with an average rating of 4.8/10. The website's critical consensus reads, "Colorful and energetic but lacking a compelling story, Wonder Park is little more than a competently made diversion for very young viewers." On Metacritic, the film has a weighted average score of 45 out of 100, based on 22 critics, indicating "mixed or average reviews". Audiences polled by CinemaScore gave the film an average grade of "B+" on an A+ to F scale.

== Other media ==
=== Unreleased television series ===
Prior to Wonder Park's release, Paramount Animation announced that a television series based on the film would debut on Nickelodeon after the film's theatrical release. This would have been the third animated film from Nickelodeon Movies to have a series spin-off, after Jimmy Neutron: Boy Genius and Barnyard, and the first animated film from Paramount Animation to inspire a series spin-off from the film. On March 7, 2019, Lucky director Casey Leonard was announced as the series' producer. On December 16, 2019, the series' title, Adventures in Wonder Park, was announced. The voices in the series were set as Kitana Turnbull as June, Greg Cipes as Peanut, Jill Talley and Cam Clarke as June's parents (her father is named "Henry"), Rachael MacFarlane as Greta, Kevin Michael Richardson as Gus, Aryan Simhadri as Banky (renamed "Bunky"), Stephen Tobolowsky as Uncle Tony, Daran Norris as Principal Peters, and Raymond McLeod. Ken Hudson Campbell and Kate McGregor-Stewart were set to reprise their roles as Boomer and Aunt Albertine. The series was developed by David Zuckerman and Anne Flett-Giordano. 20 episodes were produced. Animation production was handled by Nickelodeon Animation Studio, Technicolor Group, and Mainframe Studios. (Note: Animators, artists, producers, and writers working on the series included Candice Stephenson, Ariel Goldberg, Vypac Voeur, Zoya Matheos-Fairey, Cody Jacobson, Thomas Thomas III, Cody Burke, Jose P. Cespedes, Jason Tsai, Patrick Krebs, Frank Arndt, Todd Garfield, Brian Ratchford, Kate Coffey, Laura Hohman, Rachel Tamura, Rene Menchaca Santiago, Trevor Blaise, Ben Rodriguez Cuddehe, Novefel Shahul, and Dustin d'Arnault.)

The series was planned to air in 2019, and later February 2020. Although a trailer for the series was attached to the Blu-ray release of the film, there have been no updates from Nickelodeon on the project since. A sizable collection of unfinished episodes, including animatics, storyboards and scripts, were posted online around December 9, 2022.

=== Mobile game ===
Prior to the film's release, a licensed mobile game titled Wonder Park Magic Rides was released by Pixowl.
