= Yukari Nozawa =

Japanese actress and voice actress (born 1957)

Yukari Nozawa (野沢 由香里, Nozawa Yukari; born October 9, 1957 in Niigata Prefecture) is a Japanese actress and voice actress who is affiliated with Seinenza Theater Company.

== Live appearances ==
=== TV drama ===
- Chūgakusei Nikki
- Oshin

== Voice roles ==
=== Anime television series ===
- AD Police (Nancy Wilson)
- Master Keaton (Doris Goldman)
- Rent-A-Girlfriend (Nagomi Kinoshita)
- Scrapped Princess (Baroness Bailaha)
- Seven of Seven (Headmistress)
- A Spirit of the Sun (Mrs Xia)
- Tenchi Muyo! GXP (Seto Kamiki Jurai)

=== Game ===
- James Bond 007: Everything or Nothing (Dr. Katya Nadanova)
- Vampire Hunter D (Carmila)

=== Dubbing ===
==== Live-action ====
- Annika (DI Annika Strandhed (Nicola Walker))
- The Assignment (Carla (Céline Bonnier))
- Avatar: The Way of Water (General Frances Ardmore (Edie Falco))
- Babylon A.D. (Sister Rebeka (Michelle Yeoh))
- Blood Work (Detective Jaye Winston (Tina Lifford))
- Bridesmaids (Lillian Donovan (Maya Rudolph))
- The Bucket List (Virginia Chambers (Beverly Todd))
- The Cell (Dr. Miriam Kent (Marianne Jean-Baptiste))
- Chocolat (Josephine Muscat (Lena Olin))
- A Civil Action (Anne Anderson (Kathleen Quinlan))
- Conclave (Sister Agnes (Isabella Rossellini))
- CSI: NY (Stella Bonasera)
- Diana (Oonagh Toffolo (Geraldine James))
- The Division (Kate McCafferty)
- Dune (Gaius Helen Mohiam (Charlotte Rampling))
- EDtv (Cynthia Reed (Ellen DeGeneres))
- Equity (Samantha Ryan (Alysia Reiner))
- ER (Carol Hathaway (Julianna Margulies))
- Fires (Kath Simpson (Miranda Otto))
- Five Nights at Freddy's (Aunt Jane (Mary Stuart Masterson))
- Footloose (Vi Moore (Andie MacDowell))
- Forrest Gump (Mrs. Gump (Sally Field))
- Fortitude (Governor Hildur Odegard (Sofie Gråbøl))
- From Hell (Liz Stride (Susan Lynch))
- Glee (Sue Sylvester)
- Godzilla (Dr. Elsie Chapman (Vicki Lewis))
- Greta (Greta Hideg (Isabelle Huppert))
- The Good Wife (Alicia Florrick (Julianna Margulies))
- The Green Mile (Melinda Moores (Patricia Clarkson))
- Hugo (Jehanne D'Alcy / Mama Jeanne (Helen McCrory))
- Insomnia (Rachel Clement (Maura Tierney))
- Into the Wild (Jan Burres (Catherine Keener))
- JAG (Commander Alison Krennick)
- Johnny English Strikes Again (Prime Minister of the United Kingdom (Emma Thompson))
- The Legend of Ochi (Dasha (Emily Watson))
- Lincoln (Mary Todd Lincoln (Sally Field))
- L.M. Montgomery's Anne of Green Gables (Marilla Cuthbert (Sara Botsford))
- The Mists of Avalon (Morgaine)
- Mr. Mercedes (Ida Silver (Holland Taylor))
- The Muse (Laura Phillips (Andie MacDowell))
- Spin City (Helen Winston (Deborah Rush))
- The Squid and the Whale (Joan Berkman (Laura Linney))
- Switched at Birth (Regina Vasquez)
- Their Finest (Sophie Smith (Helen McCrory))
- Transformers (Judy Witwicky (Julie White))
- Transformers: Revenge of the Fallen (Judy Witwicky (Julie White))
- Transformers: Dark of the Moon (Judy Witwicky (Julie White))
- Treadstone (Petra Andropov (Gabrielle Scharnitzky))
- Unforgotten (DCI Cassandra Stuart (Nicola Walker))
- Win Win (Jackie Flaherty (Amy Ryan))

==== Animation ====
- Arthur Christmas (Chief De Silva)
- Steven Universe (Bismuth)
