= Frank and Gordon =

- Advertisement featuring the characters from 2008.
- First appearance: 2005
- Last appearance: 2008

In-universe information
- Species: Beavers
- Occupation: Actors for Bell Canada
- Nationality: Canadian

Frank and Gordon (Jules et Bertrand in francophone media) are fictional beavers that were the focal point of Bell Canada's brand and marketing strategy from 2005 to 2008.

Originally introduced in late 2005 in Quebec, and February 2006 in the rest of Canada, to promote Bell's sponsorship of the 2010 Olympics, the anthropomorphic CGI beavers were voiced in English Canada by Norm Macdonald (Frank) and Ken Hudson Campbell (Gordon). Their misadventures with Frank getting flustered with the dimwitted Gordon made them two of the best known corporate mascots in Canada. The animated duo were created by Montreal-based Buzz Image for the Cossette advertising agency in Quebec City.

== History ==
=== Early years ===
The early commercials showed Frank and Gordon on their journey to becoming Bell mascots; from waiting outside the audition room with other human and animal hopefuls, to the audition itself, and then the meeting with Bell management when they were informed that they had "got the gig" while Gordon eyed up a sandwich on the desk. This third commercial was also the first to be created in two forms, one for English Canada, and a separate version for Francophone Canada. The English version showed them in a dumpy-looking office with a tired-sounding (but unseen) male manager who presented them with maple-leaf tuques (tukes, or woolen hats) to enhance their Canadian patriotism in their upcoming Bell commercials to air during the 2006 Winter Olympics. The French version took place in a plush executive suite, with a sultry-sounding (but unseen) female manager, who did not present them with toques. The next few commercials followed a similar thread, with Frank and Gordon getting accustomed to their new-found fame, and a house full of Bell TV/cell phone/internet -aided items at their disposal while watching the 2006 Winter Olympics. However, in the English versions, they always had their maple-leaf tuques on, and appeared in somewhat rundown conditions with ratty furniture and empty beer cans littered around, while in the French versions, the toques were not seen, and their living room appeared opulent. In one commercial, Frank pauses the TV picture on the Bell digital video recorder in the middle of figure skating that Gordon is watching, and urges Gordon to groom as Gordon coughs up a hairball. In another, Gordon claims to be sick of seeing himself on TV, so Frank suggests he go out of the house and exercise to lose some of his newly gained weight. Gordon replies that the camera "adds 10 pounds".

=== Post-Torino 2006 ===
After the 2006 Winter Olympics, the English and French commercials became unified. Most of them merely advertised Bell products, and dropped the ongoing, engaging story-line between the two main characters. One exception is the Bring It Home (French: Ça se passera ici) campaign, which takes a brief look back at previous Frank and Gordon commercials before promoting Bell as a Vancouver 2010 official sponsor.

=== Campaign end ===
The beavers appeared in their final ad for Bell on August 1, 2008 – more than a year before the Vancouver Olympics the pair was purportedly created to promote. Bell had recently been taken over by a new management team (in connection to its then-pending, but later canceled, sale to a group led by the Ontario Teachers' Pension Plan), and a spokesperson for the company said that ending the Frank and Gordon campaign (and the introduction of a new Bell logo and ad campaign later that week) was symbolic of that change.

== Commercials ==
Mobility

- Get It to Go
- Limousine
- Hockey gaming
- Hockey playoff beards
- Lil' Frank 1987 (Nintendo Sixty-FOOOOOOOOOOUR parody)
- Revolving Doors
- Spider-Man 3 (Letterman parody)
- Victories (Torino 2006 mobile video service)

Sympatico

- Megaphone
- Smooth Operator
- Traffic

ExpressVu

- Explosions (Big Shots and Desperate Housewives on CTV and A Channel)
- Hot Doctor (Grey's Anatomy and ER on CTV)
- Jelly Beans

Miscellaneous

- Bring It Home (French: Ça se passera ici) (Vancouver 2010 promo)
- "What's More Canadian" song

== Parodies ==
=== Rock et Belles Oreilles ===
Frank and Gordon were parodied in French skits by Rock et Belles Oreilles' "Bye Bye 2006" show. They were featured on Télévision de Radio-Canada Two characters named Jim and Bertrand work as rats for Bill Canada.

One skit featured Bertrand who was fired because Bill outsourced their calling centres to India. Bertrand, trying to wash windshields on the street, gets squashed by a car. The parody commercial ends with the message: "écrasez les syndicats avec Bill Canada", which translates to "squash trade unions with Bill Canada". The skit is based on two controversial events: the Bell Subco strike of 2005, and the outsourcing of Bell Canada's phone-based customer service to foreign countries such as India.

Another skit featured a parody of Frank and Gordon's infamous Megaphone commercial.

=== Videotron ===
To promote its Internet services, Videotron parodied the Frank & Gordon campaign with a commercial. It consists of the Videotron Man promoting its internet services that videotron has the best internet which then shows the man in a wood logging competition competing against a beaver, likely representing Bell Canada, in a wood logging competition against a man wearing a Videotron-branded helmet. While the beaver could only cut the log using its teeth, the Videotron man could use various wood cutting equipment such as a two-man saw or a chainsaw to represent different speed tiers. This allowed the man to cut out six different pieces of wood from the log. At the end of the commercial, the beaver is still cutting the log with his teeth, and has not finished cutting out a single piece of the log yet.
