= Tricia Vessey =

American actress

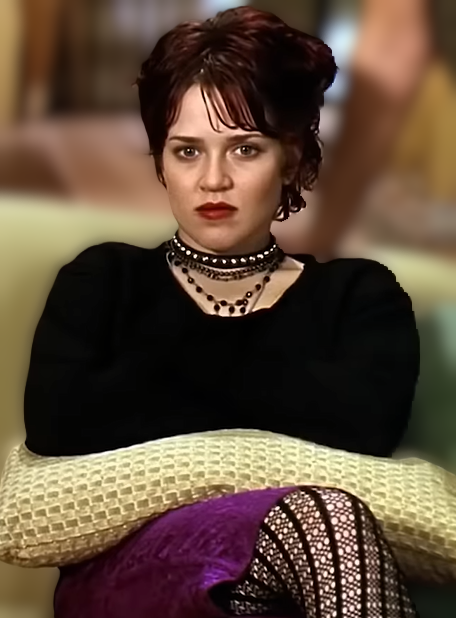
- Vessey in Bean (1997)
- Born: 1972 (age 53–54)
- Education: Brooklyn College (BA)
- Occupation: Actress · writer · producer
- Years active: 1994–2013
- Children: 1

Tricia Vessey (born 1972) is an American actress, writer, and producer. She is best known for her role in Ghost Dog: The Way of the Samurai as Louise Vargo.

== Early life and education ==
Tricia Vessey was born in 1972. Vessey has a Bachelor of Arts degree in creative writing and film production from Brooklyn College.

== Career ==
Vessey appeared in several films, including the 1997 releases The Brave and Bean, the 1999 releases Coming Soon and Ghost Dog: The Way of the Samurai, and the 2001 releases Trouble Every Day, On the Edge and Town & Country.

In 2013, Vessey co-created, directed, wrote, and produced a web series In the Production Office; the series was screened at the 2015 International Film Festival Rotterdam.

== Personal life ==
She has one child, a son, with ex-boyfriend Anton Newcombe, a musician and producer.

In 2022, Vessey testified at Danny Masterson's criminal trial as a "prior bad acts" witness. Vessey, who has never been a Scientologist, was added in 2023 as the sixth plaintiff in a case against Scientology and Masterson, alleging surveillance and harassment by the Church of Scientology after going to police with rape claims against Masterson.

== Filmography ==
=== Film ===
Year	Title	Role	Notes
1994	A Dangerous Place	Kim	
1997	The Brave	Luis's Girl #1	
1997	Bean	Jennifer Langley	
1997	The Alarmist	April Brody	
1997	Kiss the Girls	Woman at Nepenthe Bar	
1998	Standoff	Feeebie	
1998	Nowhere to Go	Niki	
1998	Too Pure	Nic	
1999	Coming Soon	Nell Kellner	
1999	Ghost Dog: The Way of the Samurai	Louise Vargo	
2001	Town & Country	Alice	
2001	Trouble Every Day	June Brown	
2001	On the Edge	Rachel Row	
2003	Nobody Needs to Know	Iris Dawn	

=== Television ===
Year	Title	Role	Notes
1994	Weird Science	Caitli	Episode: "Killer Party"
1995	Under One Roof	Janet	Episode: "Secrets"
1995	The Naked Truth	Kyle	Episode: "Star and Comet Collide! Giant Bugs Invade!"
1996	Local Heroes	Nikki	Episode: "Hometown Heroes"
1996	Marshal Law	Mama Doc	Television film
2010–2012	In the Production Office	Coco	3 episodes; also writer and director
2013	Bros	Mother	Episode: "SantaConned"
