= On the Edge (2001 theatrical film) =

2001 film by John Carney

- DVD cover
- Directed by: John Carney
- Written by: John Carney; Daniel James
- Produced by: Ed Guiney; Arthur Lappin; Jim Sheridan
- Starring: Cillian Murphy; Tricia Vessey; Jonathan Jackson; Stephen Rea
- Cinematography: Eric Edwards
- Music by: John Carney
- Production company: Hell's Kitchen Productions
- Distributed by: Universal Pictures (through United International Pictures)
- Release date: 21 September 2001
- Running time: 85 minutes
- Country: Ireland
- Languages: English; Gaelic
- Budget: $7 million

On the Edge is a 2001 Irish drama film directed by John Carney, who co-wrote it with Daniel James. The film stars Cillian Murphy, Tricia Vessey, Jonathan Jackson and Stephen Rea. It follows a suicidal young man and his stay in a Dublin psychiatric hospital where he meets new friends who greatly influence his life.

== Plot ==
Jonathan Breech is 19 when his father drinks himself to death. After a night with a gram of cocaine, another man's girlfriend and an already stolen convertible, he goes to his older brother Mikey's house at five in the morning to get his father's ashes. With the urn in the back seat he then goes on a suicidal drive.

After waking up in a hospital he is given a choice: prison for the stolen car or a mental institution. He chooses the latter. His room there is small and very near bare. Wednesdays are visiting days, when his brother can come. The recreation room has a TV, cards and velcro-tipped throwing darts. Since he is an inpatient he is forced to only wear pyjamas as per the health board rules.

He has three group therapy sessions a week with Dr. Figure. There, he meets Rachel, Toby, Nick and Leslie. He voices romantic interest in Rachel but leaves the first session early. Rachel follows him to slap him for treating her patronisingly. They begin play-boxing, but stop when she accidentally hits his mouth hard and draws blood. Jonathan goes to the restroom to take care of his bloody lip, and Rachel follows him and shows an attraction to blood, smearing it on to her throat and chest. Jonathan is unsettled, but intrigued. He then befriends Toby, who seems to also have a crush on Rachel. One-on-one therapy sessions with Dr. Figure are sarcastic, but he does ask patients to take a pledge not to kill themselves before New Year's Eve.

Jonathan's friendship with Toby starts to gel when they sneak out to a pub together at night. After returning to his room, Jonathan is surprised to discover Rachel there waiting for him. While he is lying on top of her, Rachel pulls out a razor hidden in a cigarette box and cuts her arm, which seems to intensify her sexual excitement. When the blood drips onto Jonathan's neck, he puts a stop to things.

In the following days, Jonathan has therapy sessions with Dr. Figure, and continues to flirt with Rachel, showing a more sincere interest in her. On one night out with Toby, after he hot-wires a car, Jonathan learns that Toby caused the death of his brother in a car accident. On bowling night, Jonathan gets into a conflict that nearly turns violent, and Dr. Figure helps him see that he was reckless with his well-being but that perhaps he is glad to have made it through alive.

The romantic triangle comes into sharper focus as Toby reads a new poem he wrote to Rachel and flirts timidly. Later Jonathan and Rachel chat in her room and he learns of Rachel's mother's death, and a bond between them deepens.

The friends sneak out of the hospital to host a big New Year's Eve party at Rachel's father's house. Toby watches Jonathan and Rachel's energy as they dance together, and realises that he doesn't have a chance with Rachel. Soon Jonathan and Rachel are seen going upstairs. In another part of the house Toby is opening up the garage. Jonathan tries to kiss Rachel but she won't kiss back. As the count down to the New Year begins Rachel starts to kiss back and Toby gets ready in the car to fulfill his pledge. At the stroke of midnight Toby drives off a cliff, killing himself.

The next day, Rachel's father pulls her out of the hospital, and Jonathan is miserable and worried about her. In a therapy session he asks Dr. Figure what will happen to Rachel. Dr. Figure responds that Jonathan needs to decide to value his own life. When Jonathan steals a bike to get out of the hospital, Dr. Figure tells the guard to allow him to leave. Jonathan goes to Rachel's dad's house, then to the cliffs. He finds her there, looking over the edge. Jonathan tells Rachel that he loves her, that he thinks they could still be together in a year. They walk away together.

== Reception ==
On the review aggregator website Rotten Tomatoes, 63% of 8 critics' reviews are positive, with an average rating of 5.4/10. RTÉ gave On the Edge a generally positive review, but criticized the film's ending as occurring too quickly as well as the use of its soundtrack to communicate emotional significance, referring to these two points as turning "Carney's brave attempt to tackle a very Irish subject into a good, but unremarkable film."

== Cast ==
- Cillian Murphy as Jonathan Breech
- Tricia Vessey as Rachel Row
- Jonathan Jackson as Toby
- Stephen Rea as Dr. Figure
- Paul Hickey as Mikey
- Tomás Ó Súilleabháin as Nick
- Marcella Plunkett as Leslie

== Selected songs from the soundtrack ==
- "1979" – The Smashing Pumpkins
- "Start!" – The Jam
- "Singin' in the Rain" – Gene Kelly
- "Is She Weird?" – Pixies
- "Rudolph the Red-Nosed Reindeer" – Burl Ives
- "Alright" – Supergrass
- "Catch the Sun" – Doves
- "Seven Day Mile" – The Frames
- "Please Forgive Me" – David Gray
- "He's Not That Kind of Girl" – Therapy?
- "God Kicks" – Therapy?
