= Quiznos =

American fast food chain

Quiz Holdings, LLC
- Trade name: Quiznos
- Type: Private
- Industry: Restaurants
- Genre: Fast food
- Founded: 1981; 45 years ago
- Founder: Jimmy Lambatos
- Headquarters: Denver, Colorado, United States
- Number of locations: 134 (United States); 209 (International); 343 (Total)
- Area served: North America, Europe, South America, Middle East, Asia
- Key people: Neel Patel (CEO)
- Products: Submarine sandwiches, Salads, other food products
- Revenue: US$170 million (2017)
- Owner: High Bluff Capital Partners
- Parent: REGO Restaurant Group
- Website: quiznos.com

Quiz Holdings, LLC, doing business as Quiznos, is an American franchised fast-food restaurant based in Denver that specializes in offering toasted submarine sandwiches. It was founded in 1981 by Jimmy Lambatos and sold to Rick and Richard Schaden ten years later. It then grew to nearly 5,000 restaurants; by 2013, Quiznos was the second-largest submarine sandwich shop chain in North America, behind Subway. It filed for bankruptcy in 2014; by 2016, it had dropped to ninth place, and the number of Quiznos locations in the United States fell from a 2007 high of 4,700 to just 400 a decade later.

== History ==
=== Early history ===
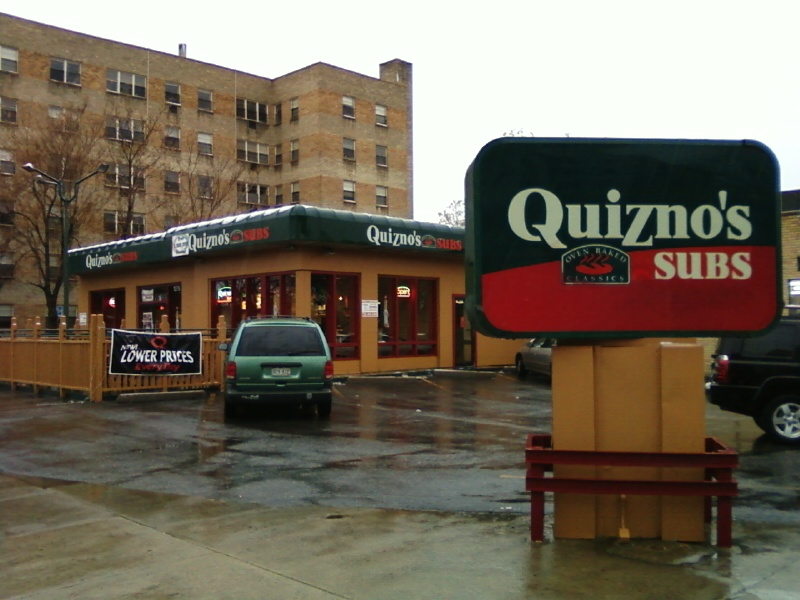
The first Quiznos Subs restaurant

The first Quiznos restaurant was opened in 1981 in Denver, Colorado, by founder Jimmy Lambatos and his partner, Todd Disner. Lambatos was an experienced chef, having worked as an executive chef for the Colorado Mine Co. Steakhouse and founded the Italian restaurant Footers in 1978.

The first location was at the corner of 13th and Grant Streets in the Capitol Hill neighborhood of the city; it featured special baguette-style bread, special dressings, and unique recipes. Lambatos said of his decision to toast the submarine sandwiches at the first Quiznos that, "it's a signature type of thing. Heating anything brings out the flavors in food products." In addition to submarine sandwiches, the menu included salads, soups, and desserts.

=== Expansion ===
Quiznos availability as of 2025 by country Current locations Former locations

In 1983, the restaurant started offering franchises to facilitate expansion, under the name Quiznos American, Inc. By 1987, 12 Quiznos restaurant locations were operating in the United States. In the same year, Rick Schaden, at the age of 23, and his father, aviation attorney Richard Schaden, opened their first Quiznos franchise in a Boulder, Colorado, shopping center. They opened three additional restaurants before purchasing the 18-restaurant chain from the founders in January 1991. They renamed it the Quiznos Franchise Corp. Rick Schaden became the president and then CEO of Quiznos after the purchase.

Quiznos was taken public in February 1994, with an initial public offering of 1,000,000 shares of stock at $5 per share, resulting in a $4.4 million yield. By the end of 1995, Quiznos had 103 different locations.

In 1997, Quiznos became the number-three submarine sandwich franchise in the world, with 278 locations in the U.S. and Puerto Rico. The company again went private in June 2001 by the Schaden family who owned 60% of the public company shares. In 2005, the company partnered with Ray Wilson to open a new chain of fitness clubs called 123 Fit. At its peak in 2007, there were more than 5,000 Quiznos franchise locations.

Until 2005, the Coca-Cola Company was the primary soft drink supplier for the franchise. In 2003, Coca-Cola signed an exclusive agreement to provide soft drinks to the competing Subway franchise to take effect two years later; Quiznos responded with signing an exclusive deal with PepsiCo (except in Canada and on college campuses that have exclusive deals with Coca-Cola) and Dr Pepper Snapple Group (to serve Dr Pepper) to take effect the same year as Subway's switchover. In 2019, Quiznos switched back to Coca-Cola products, ending its 14-year relationship with Pepsi.

=== International expansion ===
Quiznos' logo prior to 2022

The first location in Canada (and outside of the United States) opened in Vancouver in 1996.

In 1998, Quiznos Canada acquired the master franchise rights to Quiznos restaurants in Canada, as well as the master rights in the United Kingdom in 1999. Glenvista Enterprises then acquired the rights for several states in Australia. KMN USA LLC acquired the franchise rights for Japan, opening its first location in early 1999.

The first European location opened in 2001 in Peterborough in England.

In 2002, Wendy's acquired the rights to the brand for franchises in Australia and later in New Zealand but was unsuccessful in launching the chain in either country. Quiznos opened a handful of Australian locations until in 2007 they were shut down by the Australian Competition and Consumer Commission for providing fraudulent information to their franchisees. The first location in Mexico opened in Monterrey in 2002.

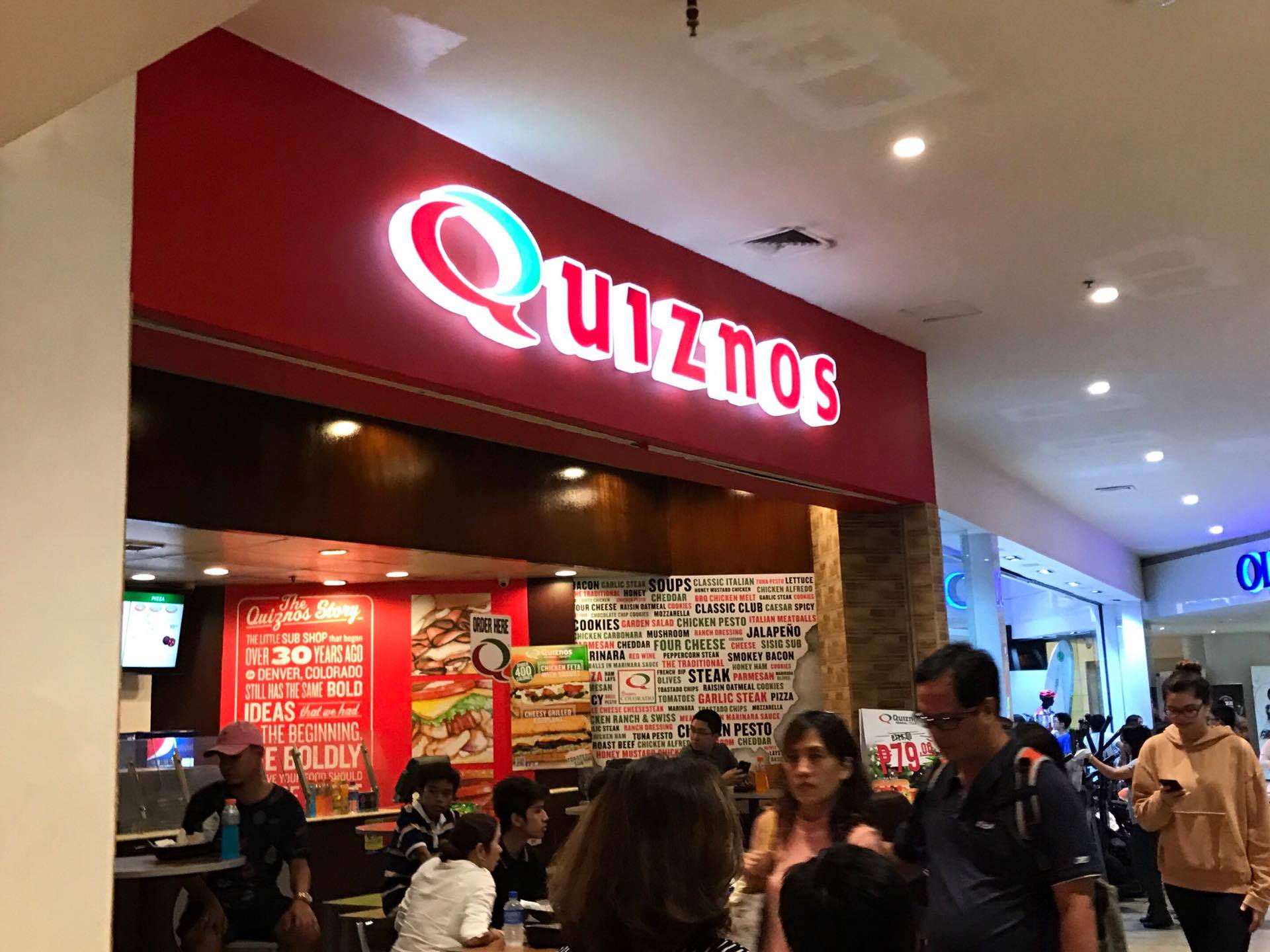
One of the first Quiznos branches in the Philippines

In 2010 the chain said it planned to expand, opening locations in over 40 countries and territories, including Europe, the Middle East, Southeast Asia and Central and South America by 2012.

The first location in India opened in Hyderabad in 2011, followed by the first location in the Philippines opened in 2012.

In July 2013, the company planned to expand into Russia, looking to open about 500 stores. A November 2013 article reported that "Following its most recent international successes in Mexico, Russia, and the United Arab Emirates, Quiznos will bring toasted sandwiches to Indonesia with the signature of PT Quiznosindo as the brand's newest franchisor. The group, led by Tan Po Lian, plans to open 100 units in Indonesia over the next 10 years...Expansion into Singapore, South Korea, the Philippines, and Indonesia is part of Quiznos' continued international development plan to open more than 1,000 international stores in more than 40 countries by 2020."

In 2013, Quiznos opened its first two locations in Russia during the same weekend in St. Petersburg. In 2014, Quiznos opened locations in Iraq and Pakistan.

Quiznos opened its first Taiwan location in Taipei and also its first United Arab Emirates location in Abu Dhabi in September 2014. Quiznos exited the Taiwan market in July 2018 based on a post on the Quiznostaiwan Facebook page.

Quiznos also operated restaurants across Ireland by Supermac's. Today all of these have been replaced by Supersubs and the only remaining Quiznos is located in Dublin.

=== Restructuring ===
Between 2007 and 2009, 1,000 Quiznos stores in the United States closed. After the closure of around 2,000 restaurants during the Great Recession, a majority stake in the company was purchased by Avenue Capital Group of New York in January 2012. In the purchase, about one-third of the company's $900 million debt was eliminated, and about $150 million in cash was added to the company's balance sheet." Avenue Capital Group brought on turnaround specialist Harsha V. Agadi as Quiznos executive chairman. They also brought on Stuart Mathis as CEO, the former president of The UPS Store, who said that the company would try to counteract shrinking sales by promoting the quality of its food.

=== Bankruptcy ===
On March 14, 2014, Quiznos filed for Chapter 11 bankruptcy in the United States Bankruptcy Court for the District of Colorado. Quiznos said it would continue operating while it restructured its debt and made operational improvements. Quiznos emerged from bankruptcy on June 30, 2014, having reduced its debt by approximately $400 million.

=== Post-bankruptcy ===
On December 1, 2015, Quiznos opened a concept restaurant called Quiznos Grill, hoping to re-brand its products and increase menu offerings. Initial reviews of this restaurant highlighted the high price (US$20) once items were added to the sandwich (vegetables, cheese, etc.) or meal (chips, drinks, etc.). In late 2016, the Quiznos Grill concept was abandoned and relaunched as Zeps Epiq Sandwiches. Some Quiznos Grill sandwiches remained on the menu, while vegetarian choices, salads, all-day breakfasts, and loaded tater tots were added.

On June 11, 2018, Quiznos announced that it had been acquired by California-based High Bluff Capital Partners. The chain did not move its headquarters. The company's REGO Restaurant Group announced a new prototype in 2021, the first of which opened in Hobbs, New Mexico. The company's new Qube format, prefab drive-thru units, fit on smaller parcels, can have better unit economics than traditional brick-and-mortar restaurants, and are cheaper and faster to build.

As of December 6, 2023, 145 Quiznos restaurants remained in the United States, down from 176 in 2022. A partnership with Nebraska gas station chain Pump & Pantry in 2022 has resulted in four successful locations, and plans to open six more.

== Advertising ==
The company's first major advertising push was a successful advertising campaign during the 2002 Super Bowl. Early TV spots advertised the innovation of toasting sandwiches, as compared to the inventor of pants (humorously contrasted with men wearing bushes). One commercial in 2003 depicted a man (played by Jim Parsons) who had been "raised by wolves" by suckling at a mother wolf's teat. Other promotions include an early 2004 campaign featuring bizarre, rodent-like, singing creatures called Spongmonkeys, edited by Joel Veitch, as well as a series of Quiznos commercials in Canada featuring hockey commentator Don Cherry. In 2005, Quiznos launched a campaign featuring Baby Bob.

In June 2006, Quiznos revealed its new slogan: "Eat Up." Ads nationwide feature a Quiznos sub with steam emanating from it with the tagline, "Mmmm... toasty." Actor Michael Clarke Duncan formerly provided the voiceover for all Quiznos commercials. On September 18, 2006, Quiznos launched the most aggressive advertising campaign aimed at Subway. Dubbed the "Prime Rib Cheesesteak Challenge," customers were asked to compare the brand new Prime Rib Cheesesteak against Subway's Cheesesteak sandwich. The claim is that the Prime Rib Cheesesteak has twice the meat of Subway's Cheesesteak. If the customers are not satisfied, then they can fill out a form, mail the form along with their receipt, and they will receive a coupon for a free sandwich. In subsequent advertisements, Quiznos was shown competing with the fictional "Wrong Way" restaurant based on competing restaurants.

In 2016, the company launched its mobile-based loyalty program. This app was aimed at rewarding Quiznos' most loyal customers and to gather customer feedback to improve product and operations.

=== Mascots ===
In 2004, Quiznos started using fuzzy-looking creatures called the Spongmonkeys (which were designed by Joel Veitch) in their advertising commercials. One plays the guitar, and the other sings "We Love the Subs" in an apparent and shorter spoof of their original song, "We Like the Moon." Several commercials with the Spongmonkeys were released, including ones about rejoice and coupons. However, after a few months, Quiznos discontinued airing the commercials.

On July 17, 2023, Quiznos announced the return of the Spongmonkeys after almost two decades with a new advertisement (again created and voiced by Veitch) in which they go on a road trip, singing about "the gas prices and public restrooms and the creepy billboards". The new campaign comes as part of Quiznos' effort to expand again after their decline in the 2010s.

== Lawsuits and controversies ==
Quiznos has been the target of several lawsuits related to its treatment of franchisees, including lawsuits in New Jersey and Wisconsin. It has faced more lawsuits from franchisees than bigger chains, such as McDonald's, Burger King, Wendy's, and even its sandwich competitors Subway and Blimpie, according to an analysis by the legal research firm Thomson West. In February 2007, Quiznos franchisees filed a lawsuit seeking class-action status in Michigan. One lawsuit (filed in New Jersey and seeking class-action status) said that the astounding growth record of Quiznos was merely a mirage. In 2003 and 2004, Quiznos said it sold 234 "trade areas" in New Jersey to franchisees, collecting the $25,000 franchisee fee, but none of these locations ever opened, according to the lawsuit. Three years after handing over her check for the fee, Elisa Whitehall said that she had yet to open a Quiznos in the location she bought and that Quiznos refused to return the fee.

One lawsuit cited a memorandum drafted by a Quiznos lawyer in 2003 that stated, "40 percent of Quiznos units are not breaking even," a fact that prospective franchisees say they were never told. The United States Small Business Administration said 23.4 percent of Quiznos franchises with SBA loans failed. In contrast, Subway had a 4.8 percent failure rate.

Fredrick N. Westerfield ran three Quiznos in Wisconsin as a single example of an unprofitable franchise. After spending $14,000 in personal savings to keep the stores running, he realized he had a debt of $750,000. He closed all his stores in 2005. "Customers used to come into the store and say to me, 'You must be rolling in the money,'" recalled Mr. Westerfield. "If they only knew."

In 2002, the Seattle Times reported that the company initially ignored the plight of a Quiznos employee who took over operations of one Quiznos store after the true owner abandoned it. Months later, the store was closed. In June 2004, the Quiznos at Downtown Crossing, Boston, was at the center of a hepatitis scare.

In 2006, Quiznos sent letters to 300 franchises saying mystery shoppers would be coming to test their services. The company sued franchise owners Richard Piotrowski and Ellen Blickman for not putting enough meat in a prime rib sandwich. Piotrowski and Blickman countersued and won the lawsuit in 2009. Judge Morris Hoffman called the meat-weighing exercise and subsequent termination letters a "charade" aimed at bolstering a national ad campaign against rival Subway.

On November 27, 2006, Bhupinder Baber, franchise owner of two Quiznos locations in Long Beach, California, died by suicide after a legal battle with the company. In his suicide note, Baber said that the way he was treated by Quiznos drove him to suicide. The Toasted Subs Franchisee Association (TSFA), a group of franchisees, posted Baber's suicide note on its website, and intended to raise money for Baber's family. Quiznos attempted to terminate the TSFA's franchises. The TSFA in turn filed an injunction on December 15, 2006, in the District Court of Colorado. A 2014 article in the Long Beach Post suggested that the factors that contributed to Baber's suicide also led to the parent company's bankruptcy in 2014.

As of July 1, 2010, Quiznos was close to a settlement over the multiyear class-action lawsuit covering nearly 10,000 of its current and former franchisees. The case comprises four separate class-action lawsuits dating back to 2006 which consolidated in 2009—involved allegations by attorneys for franchisees that Quiznos Franchise Co. LLC and other entities with ownership or control of the Quiznos chain had violated U.S. racketeering and corruption statutes. Also at issue were the supply chain and food costs, marketing and advertising funds, and disputes among franchisees that agreed to, but did not open, locations and whether royalties are owed. Quiznos denied all claims made in the lawsuits, and the settlement agreement involves no finding or admission of liability. Nonetheless, the cost to Quiznos has been estimated from $100 to $200 million while also forcing it to implement a new business plan "which puts more support into its franchisees".

== See also ==
- List of submarine sandwich restaurants
