= List of reality television programs =

This is a list of reality television series, by general type, listed with the date of their premiere. A few details are added for some shows that do not have their own article. See reality television for further descriptions.

== Documentary style ==
In this genre, camera crews follow the daily interactions of people in ordinary places, such as airports or restaurants, or follow people in a specific profession.

- Up series (began with Seven Up! in 1964) (UK)
- An American Family (1973)
- The Family (1974) (UK)
- Sightings (1991)
- The Real World (1992)
- Sylvania Waters (1992) (Australia)
- The Living Soap (1993) (UK)
- Road Rules (1995)
- Airport (1996) (UK; BBC)
- Airline (UK; ITV's imitation of Airport)
- Airline
- The Crocodile Hunter (1996)
- Driving School (1997) (UK; BBC)
- Bug Juice (1998)
- Emergency Vets (1998)
- True Life (1998)
- Gachinko! (ガチンコ!) (1999) (Japan)
- The Band-Josie 7 (2000) (Australia)
- Making the Band (2000)
- Project Greenlight (2001)
- Scariest Places on Earth (2001)
- U8TV: The Lofters (2001) (Canada; Life Network)
- Making the Band 2 (2002)
- The Salon (2002)
- Sorority Life (2002)
- American Chopper (2003)
- Fraternity Life (2003)
- Jamie's Kitchen (2003)
- The Restaurant (2003)
- Starting Over (2003)
- Race to the Altar (2003)
- American Casino (2004)
- American Hot Rod (2004)
- Amish in the City (2004)
- Bands Reunited (2004)
- The Casino (2004)
- College Hill (2004)
- Dog the Bounty Hunter (2004) (US; A&E Network)
- Family Plots (2004) (US; A&E Network)
- Ghost Hunters (2004)
- Laguna Beach: The Real Orange County (2004)
- Rachael Rocks (2004)
- Untold Stories of the E.R. (2004)
- Family Bonds (2004–2005)
- An Amish Christmas (2005)
- Deadliest Catch (2005)
- Miami Ink (2005)
- Stranded with Cash Peters (2005)
- The Ultimate Fighter (2005) (US)
- Who's Your Daddy? (2005)
- 8th & Ocean (2006)
- Bonds on Bonds (2006) (ESPN)
- Dallas Cowboys Cheerleaders: Making the Team (2006)
- Fame Asylum (2006)
- King of Cars (2006)
- Opening Soon
- The Real Housewives of Orange County (2006)
- Bullrun (2007)
- Curl Girls (2007)
- Deadline (2007)
- Ice Road Truckers (2007)
- Kate Plus 8 (2007)
- LA Ink (2007)
- Say Yes to the Dress (2007)
- Sex Change Hospital (2007)
- 19 Kids and Counting (2008)
- Ax Men (2008)
- Chef School (2008)
- David Tutera's CELEBrations (2008)
- The Real Housewives of Atlanta (2008)
- The Real Housewives of New York City (2008)
- BBQ Pitmasters (2009)
- Bondi Vet (2009)
- The Colony (2009) (US; Discovery)
- Full Throttle Saloon (2009) (US; TruTv)
- Jersey Shore (2009)
- Jockeys (2009) (US; Animal Planet)
- NYC Prep (2009)
- The Real Housewives of New Jersey (2009)
- Teen Mom (2009)
- Toddlers & Tiaras (2009)
- American Restoration (2010) (US)
- Boston Med (2010)
- Freshwater Blue (2010)
- The Generations Project (2010)
- Geordie Shore (2010) (UK)
- Half Pint Brawlers (2010)
- Jerseylicious (2010)
- Love & Hip Hop (2010)
- Bad Girls Club (2007) (US)
- Made in Chelsea (2010) (UK)
- Gold Rush (2010)
- Oddities (2010)
- Basketball Wives (2010)
- The Only Way Is Essex (2010) (UK)
- The Real Housewives of Beverly Hills (2010)
- The Real Housewives of D.C. (2010)
- Swamp People (2010)
- The Real L-Word: Los Angeles (2010)
- Say Yes to the Dress: Atlanta (2010)
- Sister Wives (2010)
- Throttle Junkies TV (2010)
- 24 Hours in A&E (2011) (UK)
- Bear Whisperer (2011)
- Braxton Family Values (2011)
- Dance Moms (2011)
- Me'usharot (2011) (Israel)
- Mob Wives (2011)
- My Transsexual Summer (2011)
- The Real Housewives of Athens (2011)
- The Real Housewives of Miami (2011)
- Say Yes to the Dress: Bridesmaids (2011)
- Say Yes to the Dress: Randy Knows Best (2011)
- Teen Mom 2 (2011)
- My Big Fat American Gypsy Wedding (2012)
- Breaking Amish (2012)
- Cheer Perfection (2012)
- Duck Dynasty (2012)
- Here Comes Honey Boo Boo (2012)
- Mountain Men (2012)
- NY Med (2012)
- Push Girls (2012)
- Randy to the Rescue (2012)
- The Real Housewives of Vancouver (2012)
- Saw Dogs (2012)
- Turbine Cowboys (2012)
- Love & Hip Hop: Atlanta (2012)
- The Valleys (2012) (UK)
- WAG Nation (2012) (Australia)
- Gypsy Sisters (2013)
- Married to Medicine (2013)
- Below Deck (2013)
- Breaking Amish: Brave New World (2013)
- Fame in the Family (2013) (US)
- Fixer Upper (2013)
- Pretty Wicked Moms (2013)
- Les Vraies Housewives (2013) (France)
- Weed Country (2013)
- The Gossip Game (2013)
- Alaskan Bush People (2014)
- Branson Famous (2014)
- Bring It! (2014)
- Chrisley Knows Best (2014)
- The Curse of Oak Island (2014)
- Escape Club (2014)
- Ladies of London (2014)
- Party Down South (2014)
- The Real Housewives of Melbourne (2014)
- Rich Kids of Beverly Hills (2014)
- Love & Hip Hop: Hollywood (2014)
- This Is Hot 97 (2014)
- 3AM (2015)
- Boston EMS (2015)
- Breaking Greenville (2015)
- The Real Housewives of Cheshire (2015)
- Save My Life: Boston Trauma (2015)
- Bringing Up Bates (2015)
- WAGS (2015)
- Dash Dolls (2015)
- Expedition Unknown (2015)
- My Life as a College Student (2015–17)
- Suomen täydelliset venäläisnaiset (2015) (Finland)
- #BlackLove (2015)
- Below Deck Mediterranean (2016)
- Open Your Heart (2016)
- WAGS Miami (2016)
- Married to Medicine: Houston (2016)
- Floribama Shore (2017)
- Siesta Key (2017)
- WAGS Atlanta (2017)
- Dr. Pimple Popper (2018)
- Married to Medicine: Los Angeles (2019)

=== Docusoaps starring celebrities ===
This genre, launched most successfully by music channel MTV, follows a camera crew into the lives of celebrities.

- This Is Your Life (1952) (US)
- The Anna Nicole Show (2002)
- The Osbournes (2002)
- Newlyweds: Nick and Jessica (2003)
- *NSYNC: The Best Life Ever (2003)
- Rich Girls (2003)
- The Simple Life (2003)
- Viva La Bam (2003)
- The Surreal Life (2003)
- The Ashlee Simpson Show (2004)
- Blow Out (2004) (US)
- The Gastineau Girls (2004)
- Growing Up Gotti (2004)
- The Simple Life 2 (2004)
- 'Til Death Do Us Part: Carmen and Dave (2004)
- Being Bobby Brown (2005)
- Britney and Kevin: Chaotic (2005)
- Filthy Rich: Cattle Drive (2005)
- The Girls Next Door (2005)
- Hogan Knows Best (2005)
- I Married a Princess (2005)
- Kathy Griffin: My Life on the D-List (2005)
- Meet the Barkers (2005)
- My Fair Brady (2005)
- Run's House (2005)
- The Simple Life: Interns (2005)
- Tommy Lee Goes to College (2005)
- Totally Scott-Lee (2005) (UK)
- #1 Single (2006)
- Chantelle: Living the Dream (2006) (UK)
- Gene Simmons Family Jewels (2006)
- Girls Aloud: Off the Record (2006) (UK)
- House of Carters (2006)
- The Princes of Malibu (2006)
- Rob & Big (2006)
- Adventures in Hollyhood – Three Six Mafia (2006)
- The Hills (2006)
- The Janice Dickinson Modeling Agency (2006)
- Keeping Up with the Kardashians (2007)
- Kimora: Life in the Fab Lane (2007)
- Life of Ryan (2007)
- Snoop Dogg's Father Hood (2007)
- The City (2008)
- Flipping Out (2008)
- New York Goes to Hollywood (2008)
- The Rachel Zoe Project (2008)
- Kourtney and Kim Take Miami (2009)
- New York Goes to Work (2009)
- Brandy & Ray J: A Family Business (2010)
- Frank the Entertainer in a Basement Affair (2010)
- Real and Chance: The Legend Hunters (2010)
- Audrina (2011)
- Ice Loves Coco (2011)
- Khloé & Lamar (2011)
- Kourtney and Kim Take New York (2011)
- Son of a Gun (2011)
- Tia & Tamera (2011)
- Young Money Diaries (2011)
- Brynne: My Bedazzled Life (2012) (Australia)
- Married to Jonas (2012)
- Mrs. Eastwood & Company (2012)
- Snooki & Jwoww (2012)
- Chrissy & Mr. Jones (2012)
- Cassadee Pope: Frame by Frame (2013)
- Dog and Beth: On the Hunt (2013)
- One Direction: The Best Life Ever (2013)
- Total Divas (2013)
- Vanderpump Rules (2013)
- Christina Milian Turned Up (2014)
- Kourtney and Khloé Take The Hamptons (2014)
- K. Michelle: My Life (2014)
- The Family Payne (2014)
- Luke Hemmings Crossed His Heart (2015)
- Jared & Miley (2015)
- I Am Cait (2015)
- Stewarts & Hamiltons (2015)
- I Love Kellie Pickler (2015)
- Total Bellas (2016)
- Rob & Chyna (2016)
- Life of Kylie (2017)
- Miz & Mrs. (2018)
- Very Cavallari (2018)
- Crikey! It's the Irwins (2018)
- The Hills: New Beginnings (2019)
- Lindsay Lohan's Beach Club (2019)
- BossBabes (2019) (New Zealand)
- Joseline's Cabaret (2020)

=== Financial transactions and appraisals ===
- Antiques Roadshow (1997)
- Pawn Stars (2009) (US)
- Hardcore Pawn (2010) (US)
- American Pickers (2010) (North America)
- Auction Hunters (2010) (North America)
- Storage Wars (2010) (North America)
  - Storage Wars (2010) (US)
  - Storage Wars (2013) (Canada)
- Storage Hunters (US – 2011, UK – 2014)
- Dealers (2012) (UK)

=== Extraordinary people ===
- Real People (1979)
- That's Incredible! (1980)

== Structured reality ==
The Primetime Emmy Awards, which have given an award for Outstanding Structured Reality Program define structured reality shows as shows that "contain consistent story elements that mostly adhere to a recurring structured template."

- Ramsay's Kitchen Nightmares (2004)
- Dragons' Den (2005)
- Kitchen Nightmares (2007)
- Human Wrecking Balls (2008) (G4)
- Shark Tank (2009)
- Property Brothers (2011)

=== Historical re-creation ===
This genre takes modern-day contestants and puts them in the lifestyle of historical people or places.

- Living in the Past (TV series) (1978) (UK; BBC)
- The 1900 House (1999) (UK; PBS)
- Pioneer Quest: A Year in the Real West (2000) (Canada)
- The 1940s House (2001) (UK)
- The Edwardian Country House aka Manor House (2002)
- Frontier House (2002) (US; PBS)
- Lads' Army (2002, 2004, 2005, 2006) (UK)
- Quest for the Bay (2002) (Canada)
- Schwarzwaldhaus 1902 (Blackforest House 1902) (2002) (Germany)
- The Ship (2002) (UK)
- Klondike: The Quest for Gold (2003) (Canada)
- Le Moyen 1903 2003 (Switzerland/TSR)
- That'll Teach 'Em (2003, 2004, 2006) (UK)
- Warrior Challenge (2003) (US)
- Colonial House (2004) (US; PBS)
- Infamous (2004, E!)
- Regency House Party (2004) (UK)
- Windstärke 8 – Das Auswandererschiff 1855 (Windstrength 8 – Immigration Ship of 1855) (2004/2005) (Germany)
- The Colony (2005) (Australia)
- Die Harte Schule der 50er Jahre (The Hard School of the 1950s) (2005) (Germany)
- MTV's The 70s House (2005)
- Outback House (2005) (Australia)
- Tales from the Green Valley (2005) (UK)
- Coal House (2007) (UK)
- Kid Nation (2007) (US)
- Coal House At War (2008) (UK)
- Victorian Farm (2009) (UK)
- Edwardian Farm (2010) (UK)
- Turn Back Time – The High Street (2010) (UK)
- Victorian Pharmacy (2010) (UK)
- Turn Back Time – The Family (2012) (UK)
- Wartime Farm (2012) (UK)
- Tudor Monastery Farm (2013) (UK)
- Back in Time for... (2015) (UK)

=== Dating ===
In this genre, couples or singles are brought together in dating or romantic situations.

- Boer soek 'n vrou (South-Africa)
- The Dating Game (1965)
- Punch de Date (パンチDEデート) (1973) (Japan)
- Love Connection (1983–1994, 1998–1999, 2017–2018)
- Neruton Benikujiradan (ねるとん紅鯨団) (1987) (Japan)
- Ainori (あいのり) (1999) (Japan)
- Blind Date (US) (1999)
- Who Wants to Marry a Multi-Millionaire? (2000)
- The 5th Wheel (2001)
- Chains of Love (2001)
- Dismissed (2001)
- Farmer Wants a Wife (2001) (UK)
- Five Go Dating (2001) (UK)
- Temptation Island (2001)
- Who Wants to Be a Princess (2001)
- The Bachelor (2002)
  - The Bachelor (2003) (UK)
  - The Bachelor Canada (2012)
  - The Golden Bachelor (2023)
- Bachelorettes in Alaska (2002)
- ElimiDATE (2002)
- Ex-treme Dating (2002)
- Meet My Folks (2002)
- Shipmates (2001)
- Streetmate (UK)
- Would Like to Meet (UK)
- Average Joe (2003)
- The Bachelorette (2003)
  - The Bachelorette Canada (2016)
  - The Golden Bachelorette (2023)
- Cupid (2003)
- For Love or Money (2003)
- Joe Millionaire (2003)
- Married by America (2003)
- Mr. Personality (2003)
- Paradise Hotel (2003)
- Room Raiders (2003)
- Three's a Crowd (2003) (UK)
- Boy Meets Boy (2004)
- Date My Mom (2004)
- The Littlest Groom (2004)
- My Big Fat Obnoxious Fiance (2004)
- Outback Jack (2004)
- The Player (2004)
- Playing It Straight (US – 2004, UK – 2005)
- The Ultimate Love Test (2004) (US)
- Who Wants to Marry My Dad? (2004)
- Celebrity Love Island (2005) (UK)
- How to Get Lucky (2005) (UK)
- Next (2005)
- Shopping for Love (2005) (Australia)
- Strange Love (2005)
- Beija Sapo (Brazil) (2005–2007)
- Vai dar Namoro (Brazil) (2005)
- 12 Corazones (2006)
- Chantelle's Dream Dates (2006) (UK)
- Estoy por tí (Spain)
- Flavor of Love (2006)
- I Love New York (2007)
- Matched in Manhattan (2006)
- Parental Control (2006)
- Age of Love (2007)
- MTV Splitsvilla (2007) (India)
- Rock of Love with Bret Michaels (2007)
- A Shot at Love with Tila Tequila (2007)
- Momma's Boys (2008)
- Real Chance of Love (2008)
- Tough Love (2008)
- Transamerican Love Story (2008)
- Daisy of Love (2009)
- Dating in the Dark (2009)
- For the Love of Ray J (2009)
- Iron brides (2009)
- Megan Wants a Millionaire (2009)
- More to Love (2009)
- Bachelor Pad (2010)
- [V] Lovenet (2010)
- Seducing Cindy (2010)
- Excused (2011)
- Bachelor in Paradise (2014)
- Are You the One? (2014)
- Ex on the Beach (2014) (UK)
- I Wanna Marry "Harry" (2014)
- Married at First Slight (2014)
- Love Island (2015) (UK)
  - Love Island USA (2019)
- Finding Prince Charming (2016)
- Love Avatars (脫獨工程) (2016) (Hong Kong)
- Ex on the Beach (2018) (US)
- Love Is Blind (2020)
- The Bachelor Presents: Listen to Your Heart (2020)
- The Ultimatum: Marry or Move On (2020)
  - The Ultimatum: Queer Love (2023)
- Too Hot to Handle (2020)
- Love Staycation (戀愛Staycation) (2022) (Hong Kong)
- International Markets for Sisters (姊妹們的國際市場) (2022) (Hong Kong)
- The Real Love Boat (2022)
  - The Real Love Boat (2022) (Australia)
- MILF Manor (2023)
- Perfect Match (2023)
- I Kissed a Boy (2023) (UK)
  - I Kissed a Girl (2024) (UK)

=== Makeover ===
This increasingly popular genre features ordinary people having home or lifestyle makeovers with the assistance of professionals.

- This Old House (1979) (USA)
- Changing Rooms (1996) (UK)
  - Trading Spaces (US) (2000)
- Mitre 10 Dream Home (New Zealand) (1999)
- Backyard Blitz (Australia) (2000)
- A Makeover Story (2000) (US)
- What Not to Wear (2001) (UK)
- What Not to Wear (US)
- The Block (2002) (Australia)
- Extreme Makeover (2002)
- Life Laundry (2002) (UK; house clearance)
- MTV's Made (2002)
- Monster Garage (2002) (US)
- Clean House (2003)
- Clean Sweep (2003)
- Extreme Makeover: Home Edition (2003)
- How Clean Is Your House? (2003) (UK)
- Knock First (2003)
- Monster House (2003) (US)
- Queer Eye for the Straight Guy (2003)
- Restoration (2003) (UK)
- Born Diva (Philippines) (2004)
- The Complex: Malibu (2004) (US)
- Dr. 90210 (2004) (US)
- Pimp My Ride (2004) (MTV, US)
- Style By Jury (Canada) (2004)
- The Swan (2004) (US)
- Town Haul (2004) (TLC, US)
- Trading Spaces: Home Free (2004)
- Queer Eye for the Straight Girl (2005) (US)
- Trinny & Susannah Undress (UK) (2006)
- Tabatha Takes Over (2008) (US)
- Bar Rescue (2011) (US)
- Extreme Weight Loss (2011)
- The Renovators (Australia) (2011)
- Hotel Impossible (2012) (US)
- Botched (2014)
- Just Tattoo of Us (2017–2020) (UK)
  - How Far Is Tattoo Far? (2018–2019) (US)
- DIY Rescue (Australia)
- The Hothouse (Australia)
- Location Location (Australia)
- Relationship Rehab (Style Network, US)
- Renovation Rescue (Australia)
- Trinny & Susannah Make Over America (US)

=== Lifestyle change ===
Here, ordinary people experience an extraordinary change in their environments or occupations.

- Girl Friday (1994) (UK)
- Castaway 2000 (2000) (UK)
- Supersize vs Superskinny (2000) (UK)
- Shipwrecked (2000) (UK)
- Faking It (2001) (UK; remade in US in 2003)
- Celebrity Fit Club (2002) (UK)
- Wife Swap (2002) (2003) (UK)
- Holiday Swap (2003) (UK)
- Masters and Servants (2003) (UK)
- The Biggest Loser (2004) (US)
- Dog Whisperer with Cesar Millan (2004) (US)
- He's a Lady (2004) (US)
- Holiday Showdown (2004) (UK)
- My Restaurant Rules (2004) (Australia)
- Nanny 911 (2004)
- The Resort (2004) (Australia)
- Supernanny (2004) (UK), (2005) (US)
- Trading Spouses (2004) (US)
- What the Butler Saw (2004) (UK)
- 30 Days (2005)
- Australian Princess (Australia) (2005)
- Brat Camp (2005)
- Extreme Celebrity Detox (2005) (UK)
- FC Zulu (2005-7, Denmark) – format FC Nerds also made in Sweden (FCZ), Norway (Tufte IL), Finland (FC Nörtit), Netherlands (Atletico Ananas), Germany (Borussia Banana), Australia (Nerds FC), Belgium and Spain
- Intervention (2005) (US)
- It's Me or the Dog (2005) (UK)
- Ladette to Lady (2005) (UK)
- The Monastery (2005) (UK)
- The Convent (2006) (UK)
- Shalom in the Home (2006-2007) (US)
- Trust Me – I’m A Holiday Rep (2005) (UK)
- The Bad Girls Club (2006)
- Boys will be Girls (2006) (UK)
- Survival of the Richest (2006)
- Fat March (2007) (US)
- Charm School
  - Flavor of Love Girls: Charm School (2007) (US)
  - Rock of Love: Charm School (2008) (US)
  - Charm School with Ricki Lake (2009) (US)
- Hoarders (2009) (US)
- Tool Academy (2009) (US)
- The Great Norwegian Adventure (2010–2011) (Norway)
- Jamie Oliver's Food Revolution (2010–2011)
- My Cat from Hell (2011) (US)
- Marriage Boot Camp (2013)
- The Reality of Anger Management (2014) (US)
- Love is in the Heir (2004)

=== Fantasies fulfilled ===
- Aswamedham (India)
- Thrill of a Lifetime (1982–88 & 2002) (Canada & USA)
- Wish Ko Lang (2002) (Philippines)
- Are You Hot? (2003)
- No Opportunity Wasted (2004)
- Your Reality Checked (2004)
- Let's Get This Party Started (2005) (US)
- Three Wishes (2005) (US)
- Simpleng Hiling (Philippines)
- Willingly Yours (Philippines)
- Điều ước thứ 7 (2014) (Vietnam)

== Video cameras/hidden camera ==
This is perhaps the oldest reality show genre, popular as far back as the early days of television.

- Candid Camera (1948)
- Dokkiri Camera (どっきりカメラ) (1970) (Japan)
- Star Dokkiri Maruhi Hōkoku (スターどっきり（秘）報告) (1976) (Japan)
- Foul-Ups, Bleeps & Blunders (1984)
- TV's Bloopers & Practical Jokes (1984)
- Fun TV with Kato-chan and Ken-chan (1986) (Japan)
- Beadle's About (1987) (UK)
- America's Funniest Home Videos (1989)
- America's Funniest People (1990)
- Australia's Funniest Home Videos (1990)
- New Zealand's Funniest Home Videos (1990)
- Tim Conway's Funny America (1990)
- You've Been Framed! (1990) (UK)
- Totally Hidden Video (1991)
- I Witness Video (1992)
- Police Camera Action! (1994) (UK)
- Police Stop! (1994) (UK)
- Busted on the Job: Caught on Tape (1996)
- World's Funniest Videos (1996)
- Real TV (1996)
- The World's Funniest! (1997)
- World's Most Amazing Videos (1998)
- World's Wildest Police Videos (1998)
- Cheaters (2000)
- Funny Flubs & Screw-Ups (2000)
- Just for Laughs Gags (2000) (Canada)
- Maximum Exposure (2000)
- Trigger Happy TV (2000) (UK; launched comedian Dom Joly)
- Qué Locura (2001)
- Spy TV (2001)
- Stupid Behavior Caught on Tape (2001)
- The Jamie Kennedy Experiment (2002)
- Oblivious (2002)
- Girls Behaving Badly (2002)
- Boiling Points (2003) (United States)
- Punk'd (2003)
- Scare Tactics (2003)
- Totally Outrageous Behavior! (2004)
- Victim (2004) (Philippines)
- Celebrity Stitch Up (2005) (UK)
- Fire Me...Please (2005)
- Hi-Jinks (2005)
- Most Outrageous Moments (2005)
- Disorderly Conduct: Video on Patrol (2006)
- Disorder in the Court (2006)
- Hot Pursuit (2006)
- Most Shocking (2006)
- Web Junk 20 (2006)
- Whacked Out Sports (2006)
- Video Justice (2006)
- Most Daring (2007)
- Shockwave (2007)
- Video Zonkers (2007)
- Crisis Point (2008)
- Destroyed in Seconds (2008)
- MSNBC's Caught on Camera (2008)
- Rude Tube (2008) (UK)
- Whacked Out Videos (2008)
- What Would You Do? (2008) (United States)
- World's Dumbest... (2008)
- World's Wildest Vacation Videos (2008)
- Help Me (Minta Tolong) (2009) (Indonesia)
- Holy @$%*! (2009)
- It Only Hurts When I Laugh! (2009)
- Moments of Impact (2009)
- Top 20 Countdown: Most Shocking (2009)
- Tosh.0 (2009)
- Just for Laughs Gags Asia (2010) (Singapore)
- Laugh Out Loud (2010) (Philippines)
- When Vacations Attack! (2010)
- Impractical Jokers (2011)
- Ridiculousness (2011)
- Sports Show with Norm Macdonald (2011)
- Just Kidding (2013)
- TruTV's Top Funniest (2013)
- The Carbonaro Effect (2014)
- Caught on Camera with Nick Cannon (2014)
- Clipaholics (2014)
- Science of Stupid (2014)
- Utopia (2014) (United States)
- What Went Down (2014)
- Almost Genius (2015)
- Chaos Caught on Camera (2015)
- People Behaving Badly (2015)
- RealiTV (2015) (Philippines)
- FailArmy (2016)
- Walk the Prank (2016)
- Kuha Mo! (2019) (Philippines)
- Videos After Dark (2019)
- Deliciousness (2020)
- The Greatest @Home Videos (2020)
- Adorableness (2021)
- America's Funniest Home Videos: Animal Edition (2021)
- iCrime with Elizabeth Vargas (2022)
- Kuha All! (2022) (Philippines)
- Messyness (2022)
- Ring Nation (2022)
- Totally Weird and Funny (2023)
- Whacked Out (2023)
- Totally Funny Animals (2024)
- Totally Funny Kids (2024)

== Reality game shows/reality "playoffs" ==
This, the biggest and most successful reality genre, features contestants who compete for prizes, while often living together in close quarters. They usually feature the elimination of contestants until a winner is chosen. Sometimes they are considered to be "reality playoffs" since their format is similar to that of a playoff in sports.

- Beat the Clock (1950)
- Truth or Consequences (1950)
- Fort Boyard (1990) (France)
- Susume! Denpa Shōnen (進め!電波少年) (1992) (Japan)
- How Do You Like Wednesday? (水曜どうでしょう) (1996) (Japan)
- Expedition Robinson (1997)
- Shiawase Kazoku Keikaku (しあわせ家族計画) (1997) (Japan)
- The Challenge (formerly known as Real World/Road Rules Challenge) (1998)
- Susunu! Denpa Shōnen (進ぬ!電波少年) (1998–2002) (Japan)
- Big Brother (1999) (many countries)
- Big Brother (2000) (UK)
- Big Brother (2000) (US)
- Celebrity Big Brother (UK)
- The Mole (2000)
- Survivor (2000)
- No Limite (2000) (Brazil)
- The Amazing Race (2001)
- Boot Camp (2001)
- Robinson: La Gran Aventura (2001) (Venezuela)
- Cannonball Run 2001 (2001)
- Dog Eat Dog (2001) (UK)
- Fear Factor (2001)
- Kampung Quest (2014)
- Lost (2001)
- Moolah Beach (2001)
- Murder in Small Town X (2001)
- Pilipinas, Game KNB? (2001) (dubbed as "the best Philippine game show")
- 100 Hours (2002) (New Zealand)
- Protagonistas de Novela (2002) (Venezuela)
- Beg, Borrow & Deal (2002–2003)
- Big Brother (2002) (Brazil)
- Endurance (2002) (US)
- I'm a Celebrity... Get Me Out of Here! (2002) (UK)
- I'm a Celebrity... US version (US)
- Model Flat (Fashion TV, 2002)
- Under One Roof (2002)
- Dog Eat Dog (2003) (US)
- Drop the Celebrity (2003) (UK)
- Celebrity Farm (2003)
- The Games (2003) (UK)
- Going Straight (2003) (New Zealand)
- Paradise Hotel (2003)
- Való Világ (2003) (Hungary)
- The Apprentice (2004)
- Back To Reality (2004) (UK)
- The Benefactor (2004)
- The Code Room (2004)
- The Farm (2004) (UK)
- Forever Eden (2004)
- Gana la Verde (2004) (US; Spanish language)
- I'm Famous and Frightened! (2004) (UK)
- Mad Mad House (2004)
- Peking Express (2004) (BEL/NED)
- Quest USA (2004) (US)
- Shattered (2004) (UK)
- Strictly Come Dancing (2004) (UK)
- Actuality TV's Casting Call (2005) (US)
- Beauty and the Geek (2005)
- Infinite Challenge (2005) (Korea)
- Pinoy Big Brother (2005) (Philippines)
- Vyvolení (2005) (Czech Republic, Slovakia)
- Shipwrecked: Battle of the Islands (2006) (UK)
- Solitary (2006) (US)
- Treasure Hunters (2006) (US)
- Ultimate Challenge (2006) (Pakistan's first adventure-based reality show)
- Unan1mous (2006) (US)
- Britain's Got Talent (2007) (UK)
- Crowned: The Mother of All Pageants (2007) (US)
- Pirate Master (2007) (US)
- Celebrity Apprentice (2008)
- I Love Money (2008)
- I Survived a Japanese Game Show (2008) (US)
- Wipeout (2008) (US)
- 13: Fear Is Real (2009) (US)
- A Fazenda (2009) (Brazil)
- The Great American Road Trip (2009) (US)
- Busão do Brasil (2010) (Brazil)
- Minute to Win It (2010) (US)
- Spring Break Challenge (2010, US)
- Expedition Impossible (2011) (US)
- The Glass House (2012)
- Celebrity Splash! (2012) (many countries)
- Redneck Island (2012)
- Shipping Wars (2012, US)
- The Genius (2013) (Korea)
- Hollywood Game Night (2013) (US)
- King of the Nerds (2013) (US)
  - King of the Nerds (British TV series) (2015) (UK)
- Whodunnit? (2013) (US)
- Capture (2013) (US)
- The Quest (2014) (US)
- Steve Austin's Broken Skull Challenge (2014)
- Hunted (2015) (UK)
  - Hunted (2017) (US)
  - Hunted (2022) (Australia)
- I Survived a Zombie Apocalypse (2015) (UK)
- Home Free (2015) (US)
- SAS: Who Dares Wins (2015) (UK)
  - SAS Australia: Who Dares Wins (2020) (Australia)
  - Special Forces: World's Toughest Test (2023) (US)
- American Grit (2016)
- Escape the Night (2016)
- Power Couple (2016) (Brazil)
- A Casa (2017) (Brazil)
- Battle of the Ex Besties (2017) (US)
- Bromans (2017) (UK)
- The Challenge: Champs vs. Pros (2017) (US)
- The Challenge: Champs vs. Stars (2017) (US)
- The Cuts Indonesia (2017) (Indonesia)
- Celebrity Big Brother (2017) (US)
- The Circle (2018) (UK)
  - The Circle (2020) (US)
  - The Circle (2020) (Brazil)
- The Heist (2018-2020) (UK)
- De Verraders (2021) (Netherlands)
  - The Traitors (2022) (Australia)
  - The Traitors (2022) (UK)
  - The Traitors (2023) (US)
- Around Naija (2021) (Nigeria)
- Ilha Record (2021) (Brazil)
- Rise and Fall (2023) (UK)
- Squid Game: The Challenge (2023) (UK)

House of Villains (2023)

- Million Dollars Secret (2025) (US)

=== Talent searches ===
Often similar to the game show genre in that there are eliminations and a final winner, this genre centers on contestants competing a specific skill or talent, rather than in random challenges.

==== Before 2000 ====
- Arthur Godfrey's Talent Scouts (1948)
- Original Amateur Hour (1948)
- Opportunity Knocks (1956) (UK)
- Star Tanjō! (スター誕生!) (1971) (Japan)
- The Gong Show (1976)
- Owarai Star Tanjō! (お笑いスター誕生!!) (1980) (Japan)
- Star Search (1983)
- Stars in Their Eyes (1990) (UK)
- Asayan (1995) (Japan)
- Popstars (New Zealand) (1999) (UK version bands Hear'Say and Liberty X)

==== 2000s premieres ====
- BattleBots (2000–2002, 2015–)
- Search for a Supermodel (Australia) (2000)
- Bands on the Run (2001)
- Operación Triunfo (2001) (Spain)
- Idol
  - Pop Idol (2001–2003) (UK)
  - American Idol (2002)
    - American Juniors (2003)
  - Canadian Idol (2002)
  - Australian Idol (2003)
  - Indonesian Idol (2004)
  - Philippine Idol (2006)
  - Pinoy Idol (2008)
  - Idol Philippines (2019)
- Model Behaviour (2001–2002) (UK)
- WWE Tough Enough
  - WWF/WWE Tough Enough (2001)
  - WWE Tough Enough 2 (2002)
  - WWE Tough Enough 3 (2003)
- La Academia (2002) (Mexico)
- Fame Academy (2002) (2003) (UK)
- Popstars: The Rivals (2002) (UK)
- Worst Driver (franchise)
  - Britain's Worst Driver (2002)
  - Canada's Worst Driver (2005)
  - America's Worst Driver (2010)
- Top Model
  - America's Next Top Model (2003)
  - Australia's Next Top Model (2005)
  - Britain's Next Top Model (2005)
  - Canada's Next Top Model (2006)
  - Top Model Ghana (2006)
- Be a Grand Prix Driver (2003) (UK)
- The Big Break (2003)
- Comic Relief does Fame Academy (2003) (2005) (2007)
- Last Comic Standing (2003)
- Nashville Star (2003)
- Performing As... (2003)
- Reborn in the USA (2003) (UK)
- Search for the Star in a Million (2003) (Philippines) ABS-CBN
- Star Académie (2003) (France)
- StarStruck (2003) (Philippines)
- Surf Girls (2003)
- WWE Diva Search (2003) (US)
- American Candidate (2004) (US)
- The Apprentice (2004–2007, US, NBC)
- The Assistant (2004)
- Bollywood Star (2004) (UK)
- Can You Be a Porn Star? (2004)
- The Contender (2004)
- Dancing with the Stars (2004) (many countries)
  - Dancing with the Stars (US) (2005)
    - Dancing with the Stars: Juniors (US) (2018)
- Dream Job (2004)
- Dream Job II (2004)
- Get Gorgeous (2004) (India)
- Hell's Kitchen (2004 – UK, 2005 – US)
- Kings of Comedy (2004) (UK)
- Little Big Star (2005) (Philippines)
- Megasztár (2004) (2005) (2006) (Hungary)
- Next Action Star (2004)
- The Next Great Champ (2004)
- Pinoy Pop Superstar (2004) (Philippines)
- Popstars Live (2004) (Australia)
- Project Runway (2004) (US)
- The Rebel Billionaire: Branson's Quest for the Best (2004)
- Star Circle Quest (2004) (Philippines)
- Strictly Come Dancing (2004) (UK)
- Super Singer (2004) (India)
- Wickedly Perfect (2004) (US)
- The X Factor (2004) (UK)
- Afghan Star (2005) (Afghanistan)
- Britain's Worst Celebrity Driver (2005) (UK)
- Celebrity Wrestling (2005) (UK)
- Filmstjerne (2005) (Norway)
- Football Icon (2005) (UK)
- Get Gorgeous II (2005) (India)
- Hit Me Baby One More Time (2005) (UK)
- Launchpad (2005) (India)
- The Next Food Network Star (2005)
- Rock Star INXS (2005)
- The Scholar (2005)
- So You Think You Can Dance (2005) (many countries)
  - So You Think You Can Dance (US) (2005)
- Strictly Dance Fever (2005) (UK)
- The Ultimate Fighter (2005, USA, Spike)
- The All Star Talent Show (2006) (UK)
- American Inventor (2006) (ABC)
- Dancing on Ice (2006) (UK)
- Dirty Dancing (2006)
- Just the Two of Us (2006) (UK)
- Knight School (2006, USA, ESPN)
- The One: Making a Music Star (2006)
- Pinoy Dream Academy (2006) (Philippines)
- Rock Star: Supernova (2006)
- Skating With Celebrities (2006) (US)
- Soapstar Superstar (2006) (UK)
- Top Chef (franchise)
  - Top Chef (2006) (US)
- The Ultimate Coyote Ugly Search (2006) (US)
- VJ Search (2006) (Canada)
- Who Wants to be a Superhero? (2006) (Sci-fi)
- Tusker Project Fame (2006) (Kenya)
- America's Most Smartest Model (2007, US)
- Don't Forget the Lyrics! (2007) (many countries)
- Ego Trip's The "White" Rapper Show (2007)
- Grease: You're the One that I Want! (2007)
- The Next Iron Chef (2007, US, Food Network)
- On the Lot (2007) (US)
- Phenomenon (2007, US, NBC)
- Pussycat Dolls Present
  - Pussycat Dolls Present: The Search for the Next Doll (2007)
  - Pussycat Dolls Present: Girlicious (2008)
- Shear Genius (2007) (US)
- The Shot (2007) (US)
- The Singing Bee (2007) (US)
- Top Design (2007) (US)
- America's Best Dance Crew (2008, US)
- Celebrity Bainisteoir (2008, Ireland)
- Ego Trip's Miss Rap Supreme (2008)
- Fáilte Towers (2008, Ireland)
- High School Musical: Get in the Picture (2008)
- I Know My Kid's a Star (2008)
- My Kid's a Star (2008)
- Redemption Song (2008)
- Scream Queens (2008)
- African Inventors & Innovators TV Program (2009–2014) (Nigeria)
- Redemption Song (2009) (US)
- Local Live (2009) (Canada)
- MasterChef Australia (2009) (Australia)
- RuPaul's Drag Race (2009)
- Super Star K (2009) (Korea)

==== 2010s premieres ====
- Bridalplasty (2010)
- Just Dance (2010) (India)
- MasterChef (2010)
- Over the Rainbow (2010)
- Parovi (2010) (Serbia)
- Skating with the Stars (2010)
- Star Anchor Hunt (2010) (India)
- The Tester (2010) (US)
- Top Shot (2010) (North America)
- Work of Art: The Next Great Artist (2010) (US)
- Worst Cooks in America (2010) (US)
- America's Best Dance Crew (2011) (North America)
- Face Off (2011) (US)
- The Glee Project (2011)
- Live to Dance (2011) (North America)
- Project Accessory (2011)
- Platinum Hit (2011)
- The Voice (many countries) (2010)
  - The Voice (2011) (US)
  - The Voice Indonesia (2013) (Indonesia)
- The X Factor (2011) (North America)
  - X Factor Indonesia (2012) (Indonesia)
- Abby's Ultimate Dance Competition (2012) (US)
- Best Ink (2012) (US)
- Ink Master (2012) (US)
- Project Runway: All Stars (2012)
- TNA British Boot Camp (2013) (United Kingdom)
- MasterChef Junior (2013)
- The Face (2013)
- American Dream Builders (2014) (US)
- Can You Beat the Professor (2014) (US)
- The Great Interior Design Challenge (2014) (UK)
- Idea to Industry (2014) (Nigeria)
- Project Runway: Threads (2014)
- Royco Fuata Flava (2014) (Kenya)
- Skin Wars (2014)
- The Great British Baking Show(2014)
- Under the Gunn (2014)
- Forged in Fire (2015) (US)
- Nach Baliye 7 (2015) (India)
- WWE Tough Enough (2015)
- Jhalak Dikhhla Jaa Reloaded (2015) (India)
- Dance Plus (2015) (India)
- D3 – D 4 Dance (2016) (India)
- Tarok got talents, (first edition winner, Sticky ya Bongtur) (2016) (Nigeria)
- YWT 01 – YOUTH WITH TALENT (2016) (Sri Lanka)
- DZ Comedy Show (2017) (Algeria)
- World of Dance (2017)
- YWT 02 – YOUTH WITH TALENT (2017) (Sri Lanka)
- Making It (2018)
- The Masked Singer (2018)
- Real Country (TV series) (2018, US)
- The Butcher (2019)
- Songland (2019)
- Hyperdrive (2019)

==== 2020s premieres ====
- America's Top Dog (2020)
- Indonesia's Next Top Model (2020) (Indonesia)
- The Masked Dancer (2020)
- King Maker IV (2021) (Hong Kong)
- Rise and Fall (2023) (UK)

== Hoax shows ==
Reality shows in which one or more participants are tricked into believing they are taking part in a legitimate show when they are actually the victim(s) of a joke. These types of shows are somewhat akin to hidden camera shows.

- The Joe Schmo Show (2003)
- $25 Million Dollar Hoax (2004)
- Faking the Video (2004)
- Joe Schmo 2 (2004)
- My Big Fat Obnoxious Boss (2004)
- My Big Fat Obnoxious Fiance (2004)
- Superstar USA (2004)
- There's Something About Miriam (2004)
- Invasion Iowa (2005)
- Space Cadets (2005) (UK)
- Monster House (2008) (Australia)
- Jury Duty (2023)

== First responder shows ==
- Boston EMS (TV series) (2015)
- Hopkins (TV series) (2008)
- Trauma: Life in the E.R. (1997)
- Nightwatch (TV series) (2015)
- Nightwatch Nation (2018)
- Nightwatch Presents: First Responders
- Paramedics (1999)
- Live Rescue (2019)
- Critical Rescue (2003)
- LA Fire & Rescue (2023)
- Fire Chasers (2017)
- Cal Fire (2021)
- Lives on Fire (2012)
- COPS (1989)
- On Patrol: Live (2022)
- America's Most Wanted (1999)
- Live PD (2016)
- Live PD: Police Patrol
- Live PD: Rewind
- Live PD: Wanted
- Live PD Presents: Top Ten Police Vehicles
- Live PD: Roll Call (2017)
- Live PD Presents: PD Cam (2018)
- Live PD Presents: Women on Patrol (2018)
- Police 24/7 (TV series) (2024)
- Under Arrest
- Police Women (TV series) (2009)
- Paranormal Cops (2009)

== See also ==
- List of television show franchises
