= Family Plots =

- Genre: Reality
- Starring: Shonna Wissmiller-Smith; Chuck Wissmiller; Melissa Wissmiller; Rick Sadler; John Greeney; David Moravee; Emily Vigney
- Opening theme: "Hell" by Squirrel Nut Zippers
- Country of origin: United States
- Original language: English
- No. of seasons: 4
- No. of episodes: 52

Production
- Executive producers: Daniel Elias; David Houts
- Production locations: Poway, California, United States
- Running time: 30 minutes

Original release
- Network: A&E Network
- Release: April 19, 2004 – May 8, 2006

Family Plots is an American reality series that followed the events and employees at the family-run Poway Bernardo Mortuary in Poway, California. It ran for two years, beginning in 2004, on the A&E Network.

== Overview ==
The show centered on the relationships between the employees, in particular Chuck Wissmiller and his three daughters, all of whom worked together at the mortuary during the show's run. Each episode featured one or two funerals with families who shared their grief while celebrating the life and contributions of their loved ones. The departed themselves were seen from time to time on the show. While the work done in the preparation room was also shown, the more graphic portions of mortuary work were limited.

The show was also aired on the Seven Network in Australia, in Canada, and Europe.

== See also ==
- Six Feet Under – an HBO series about a fictional funeral home
- List of reality television programs
- Lloyd M. Bucher – a US Navy commander whose funeral was handled from Poway Bernardo Mortuary, and whose funeral was the focus of an episode on the series
