= Quest for the Sea =

Canadian television series

Quest for the Sea is a Canadian living history-documentary television series. The series, which aired in January 2004, followed ten people as they returned to a lost way of life in a remote fishing village in Placentia Bay, Newfoundland. In simple wooden homes with only the tools, clothing, and supplies of the 1930s, they needed to rely on cod fishing for their sustenance and survival. Quest for the Sea was the fourth of the "Quest" series from producer Jamie Brown which also included Pioneer Quest: A Year in the Real West (2001), Quest for the Bay (2002), and Klondike: The Quest for Gold (2003).

== Cast ==
- Mary Ann Graham
- Harold St.Croix
- Anna Wheeler
- Elliot Wheeler
- Ralph Wheeler
- Allison Murray
- Anny Murray
- Mack Murray
- Mitchell Murray
- Monte Murray

== Episodes ==
No.	Title	Original release date
1	"A Village Called Hay Cove"	13 September 2004
In the first episode we are introduced to two modern families – the Wheelers and the Murray's – who experience life as it was lived in a 1937 rural Newfoundland outpost fishing community.
2	"King Cod"	13 September 2004
The Hay Cove families struggle with their new lifestyles as they continue fishing for cod and preparing authentic meals.
3	"The Storms of August"	13 September 2004
After weeks of struggle the Hay Cove families finally find a rhythm, and life becomes less arduous. Inside the family homes however, storms are brewing and Hay Cove descends into bickering, insults, and tears of frustration.
4	"Resettlement"	13 September 2004
As the community recovers from a terrible fight, the men take to the seas to catch enough fish to pay the debt. For the final week of their summer, the families live as one as the series concludes.
