= Elly Pourasef =

Iranian-American audiologist

- Born: Iran
- Citizenship: Iranian-American
- Occupation: Audiologist

Elly Pourasef is an Iranian-American audiologist. She is best known for being on NBC Bravo’s reality TV show, Married to Medicine: Houston series.

== Background ==
Pourasef moved to Houston, Texas while she was five with her parents and her younger sister, Pegah Pourasef where she grew up. She attended the University of Texas at Austin for a Bachelor's degree in Communication Sciences and Disorders, and for a Doctorate of Audiology degree.

In 2016, Pourasef appeared in Married to Medicine: Houston, an American reality television series which chronicles the lives of five women in the Houston medical community portraying herself as an audiologist seeing patients in her audiology clinic, Memorial Hearing. She also works as an event planner for the Persian community in Texas.

During the COVID-19 pandemic Pourasef began selling facemasks with clear shields around the mouth in order to help hearing impaired patients who make use of Lip reading to communicate.

== Filmography ==
List of television shows involving Elly Pourasef
Year	Work	Role
2016	Married to Medicine: Houston	Herself
