= RoseAnna Schick =

- Occupation: entertainment publicist

RoseAnna Schick is a Canadian entertainment publicist based in Winnipeg, Manitoba. Her background is in the film and television industry, and she participated in a 'living history' television series in 2002 called Quest for the Bay. She often speaks at conferences and seminars, and is also a freelance travel and adventure writer.
