= List of Married to Medicine episodes =

Married to Medicine is an American reality television series that premiered on March 24, 2013, on Bravo and was created by Mariah Huq. The series chronicles the lives of seven women in the Atlanta medical community with three of the women being doctors themselves, while the others are doctors' wives. It shows the group as they balance their social circles, careers, and families.

== Overview ==
Season	Episodes	Originally released		Average Viewers
Season	Episodes	First released	Last released	Average Viewers
1	13	March 24, 2013	June 4, 2013	1.57
2	17	April 6, 2014	July 24, 2014	1.43
3	18	June 7, 2015	October 11, 2015	1.02
4	16	November 6, 2016	February 24, 2017	1.07
5	18	November 5, 2017	March 23, 2018	0.87
6	18	September 2, 2018	January 13, 2019	0.90
7	18	September 8, 2019	January 5, 2020	1.04
8	19	March 7, 2021	July 18, 2021	0.75
9	18	July 10, 2022	November 6, 2022	0.68
10	17	November 5, 2023	March 17, 2024	0.68
11	18	November 24, 2024	April 6, 2025	0.54
12	16	November 30, 2025	March 29, 2026	0.52

== Episodes ==
=== Season 1 (2013) ===
Dr. Jacqueline Walters, Kari Wells, Mariah Huq, Dr. Simone Whitmore, Toya Bush-Harris and Quad Webb are introduced as series regulars.

No. overall	No. in season	Title	Original release date	U.S. viewers (millions)
1	1	"A Taste of Your Own Medicine"	March 24, 2013	1.89
Dr. Simone and Dr. Jackie have to go through the obstacles they face with life as a mother, wife, friend and OB-GYN physician; Kari, Quad, Toya, and Mariah show us the privileged life when you're married to the medical field.
2	2	"Mistress of Medicine"	March 31, 2013	1.38
Mariah works to make amends with the ladies; Quad gets advice after she goes on attack; Kari fights back by invoking Quad's invite into an event Mariah and Kari are hosting, and Simone's patient has to deal with some shocking information.
3	3	"Queen Bee Sting"	April 7, 2013	1.81
Mariah confronts Kari about Quad's dis-invite to their joint party; Quad and Kari come to terms by agreeing to meet to solve their problems; Simone's competitive side bursts out during a visit by her sister, and Jackie reveals a surprising secret.
4	4	"A Black Eye Event"	April 14, 2013	2.66
Toya unravels a hidden secret from Mariah's past, and Kari is annoyed when Mariah isn't holding true to her duties as co-host to their "Hollywood Glam" party.
5	5	"Resuscitating Reputations"	April 21, 2013	2.28
The group is divided after Toya and Mariah's physical altercation.
6	6	"Blood is Thicker than Dog Water"	April 28, 2013	1.94
Toya decides to dis-invite Mariah's family from her Halloween party; Quad sets herself up for some drama when she chooses to invite Toya and Mariah to her upcoming Puppies in Paris party.
7	7	"The Sour Squeeze"	May 5, 2013	1.58
Jackie has grown tired of all the drama in the group and hosts a Lemon Squeeze to resolve the issues between Toya and Mariah, and Mariah unveils the reasoning behind the altercation with Toya.
8	8	"Sip Happens"	May 12, 2013	1.18
Simone believes that it's time to talk with Mariah for the first time after the fight, and Mariah finally confronts Toya.
9	9	"Flatlining Friendships"	May 19, 2013	1.51
Kari brews up more drama after she slips news that Quad and Mariah didn't make it onto Toya's guest list; Jackie has some last minute things to take care of prior to her spa grand opening; Toya presents her husband's most recent business venture to some potential investors.
10	10	"The Last Supper"	May 19, 2013	1.51
Mariah invites the ladies over for a homemade traditional Bangladesh meal where Toya and Quad arrive for an intense night, and Toya and Kari choose not to attend Mariah's dinner when they uncover information regarding Quad's past.
11	11	"Reunion Part 1"	May 26, 2013	1.22
Mariah, Quad, Simone, Toya, Kari, and Jacqueline sit down with Andy Cohen to discuss the drama that unraveled this season.
12	12	"Reunion Part 2"	May 28, 2013	0.87
The conclusion of a two-part reunion features the "Married to Medicine" cast addressing the dramas of season one.
13	13	"Secrets Revealed"	June 4, 2013	0.61
Previously unseen footage from "Married to Medicine" is presented.

=== Season 2 (2014) ===
Kari Wells departed as a series regular. Dr. Heavenly Kimes and Lisa Nicole Cloud joined the main cast.

No. overall	No. in season	Title	Original release date	U.S. viewers (millions)
14	1	"Far From Heavenly"	April 6, 2014	2.40
Quad learns that Mariah is spreading rumors; Jackie would like to have another child, and Dr. Heavenly invites all the women to a cocktail party.
15	2	"Love and Basketball"	April 13, 2014	2.11
Jackie goes on a date with Curtis; Mariah wants her husband to receive a hair transplant, and Simone and Toya attempt to mend their friendship.
16	3	"A Steakhouse Beef"	April 20, 2014	2.38
Toya invites all the ladies to her son's birthday party, and Mariah and Quad get into a verbal altercation.
17	4	"A Week of Impact"	April 27, 2014	2.14
Quad puts all of her energy into her fashion line, and Simone and her husband are having a difficult time paying the bills.
18	5	"Chariot of Fiyah!"	May 4, 2014	2.31
The ladies attend Lisa Nicole's speaking event to support her, but drama ensures over the group.
19	6	"Textual Healing"	May 11, 2014	1.22
Lisa is informed about the status of her cancer, and Quad wants to make it up to Mariah by inviting her to an upcoming fashion show.
20	7	"A Fashion Faux-pas"	May 18, 2014	1.56
Jackie is surprised when Simone details her financial difficulties; Heavenly receives some gossip about Mariah, and the ladies come together to attend the Women of Atlanta fashion show.
21	8	"Guess Who's Not Coming to Dinner?"	May 25, 2014	0.92
Simone tests Jackie's mothering skills; Toya scouts for a house, and Heavenly hosts a dinner party.
22	9	"Queen of Shade"	June 1, 2014	1.87
Quad and Reco hurry to finish their samples while Mariah files a restraining order.
23	10	"Blind Date"	June 8, 2014	1.70
Simone asks Jackie for help with her love life, and Quad's business ventures lead to an argument.
24	11	"Couples Retreat"	June 15, 2014	1.55
The couples arrive in the Blue Ridge Mountains; Greg makes a controversial statement.
25	12	"The Flight of the Uterus"	June 22, 2014	1.70
Quad learns that Simone invited Mariah on the trip.
26	13	"From Courtroom to Catwalk"	June 29, 2014	0.81
Jackie's stepdaughter arrives with a revelation; Mariah tries to make peace by inviting the ladies to a business launch, and Lisa reveals her design collection.
27	14	"The Queen Bee Gets Stung"	July 6, 2014	1.91
Quad confronts Simone about their issues; Toya showcases her lavish new home, and Quad gears up for a fashion show to highlight her new puppy-couture line.
28	15	"Reunion Part 1"	July 13, 2014	1.31
The ladies re-group once again to discuss all the drama that went down this season.
29	16	"Reunion Part 2"	July 17, 2014	0.97
Final part of the reunion sees the ongoing feud between Toya and Simone boil over with an ugly ending.
30	17	"Secrets Revealed"	July 24, 2014	0.76
Unseen scenes of this past season are shown.

=== Season 3 (2015) ===
Mariah Huq departed as a series regular.

No. overall	No. in season	Title	Original release date	U.S. viewers (millions)
31	1	"Background Check Yourself"	June 7, 2015	1.33
Toya hosts a Halloween bash; problems plague Dr. Simone and Toya's friendship; Quad works on her puppy-couture line, and Dr. Jackie tests a fitness program on the ladies.
32	2	"Putt Up Or Shut Up"	June 14, 2015	1.07
Simone and Toya clash; Quad hires a private investigator to unearth dirt on Lisa Nicole and her husband, and Jackie invite the ladies to join their fitness venture.
33	3	"Inspector Quad"	June 21, 2015	0.86
Quad gets payback on Lisa; Jackie introduces her new fitness program to the ladies: "Fit is the new It".
34	4	"Friends Don't Do Background Check on Friends"	July 5, 2015	1.07
Quad makes an accusation that sends Lisa reeling.
35	5	"The Naked Truth"	July 12, 2015	0.94
The women go to the same strip club frequented by Lisa's husband.
36	6	"Queen Bee Returns to the Hive"	July 19, 2015	1.05
Lisa confronts her husband, while Quad and Mariah reunite for a heart to heart.
37	7	"Love and Races"	July 26, 2015	1.02
Lisa meets with her attorney, while Quad consults with her own high-powered attorney, Phaedra Parks.
38	8	"California Dreamin'"	August 2, 2015	1.01
Quad jets off to California with Simone and Jill; Jackie struggles to tend to her ailing father, and Lisa throws a cooking party for her son's birthday.
39	9	"Invites and Dis-invites"	August 9, 2015	0.97
Quad refocuses her energy on marketing her doggy fashion line; Dr. Heavenly's husband insists she's spending too much time away from home, and Simone withdraws Lisa's invitation to her party.
40	10	"Full Court Stress"	August 16, 2015	1.12
Toya follows through with her plan to market her husband's business; Quad has her first pop-up shop to bring "Picture Perfect Pup" to the forefront, and Toya shares a rumor.
41	11	"Boys on the Side?"	August 23, 2015	1.06
Toya scouts locations for her husband's new business; Heavenly's daughter interns for Lisa, and Lisa accuses Quad of questioning her husband's sexuality.
42	12	"Mariah the Party Crasher"	August 30, 2015	1.05
Heavenly is ready to launch her dating app; Jill throws a wild Prohibition Party, and Simone proposes a trip to the Bahamas.
43	13	"Bahama Mamas"	September 6, 2015	1.02
The couples depart for the Bahamas, while Jill and Heavenly are going head to head for round two of their disagreement.
44	14	"Baha-mania"	September 13, 2015	0.87
Simone arranges a medical mission to inspire the women to come together to help others.
45	15	"Mariah-mania"	September 20, 2015	1.08
Quad hosts the "Heroes in Healthcare" event bringing most of the women together, and Toya and Mariah exchange words.
46	16	"Reunion Part 1"	September 27, 2015	1.09
The ladies come together again to discuss the highs and lows of the third season.
47	17	"Reunion Part 2"	October 4, 2015	1.13
Final part of the reunion where we see Mariah get her say about the ladies and the husbands share their thoughts about this seasons drama.
48	18	"Secrets Revealed"	October 11, 2015	0.72
Never before seen footage are revealed from this past season.

=== Season 4 (2016–17) ===
No. overall	No. in season	Title	Original release date	U.S. viewers (millions)
49	1	"New Beginnings"	November 6, 2016	1.67
Quad has a new baby in her house; Dr. Simone and Cecil adjust to separate lives, and Toya is in trouble with the IRS.
50	2	"Forecast: Clouds With a 100% Chance of Shade"	November 13, 2016	1.70
Simone reaches out to Quad; Genise reveals her true thoughts about Dr. Heavenly, and all the women are invited to Mariah's new-beginnings party.
51	3	"Her Father's Daughter"	November 20, 2016	1.48
Toya and Lisa Nicole's friendship begins to wilt; Simone contacts her family to find her missing father, and Toya and Mariah meet in a bid to make peace.
52	4	"The Father, Son, and Heavenly's Spirit"	November 27, 2016	1.51
Simone, Quad, and Dr. Jackie head to Nashville; Heavenly does some soul searching with her spiritual guide, while Lisa and Darren seek help from a professional about their relationship.
53	5	"The Breast-est of Friends"	December 11, 2016	1.57
Heavenly and Lisa's collaboration turns ugly; Simone returns to work with a trans patient who wants gender reassignment surgery, and Jackie's topless charity photo shoot spins out of control.
54	6	"It's My Prom and I'll Throw Down if I Want to!"	December 16, 2016	0.68
Darren must face the music after flaking on Lisa's baby-making plans; Simone finds out news about her father, and Mariah and Quad go head to head at Toya's birthday party.
55	7	"Is There Life After Prom?"	December 23, 2016	0.69
Mariah and Quad's friendship is on shaky ground; Quad is planning a birthday bash for Dr. G, and Toya realizes she can no longer afford her lifestyle.
56	8	"Brutally Honest Makeover"	December 30, 2016	0.80
Toya and Eugene must move into a smaller house; Jackie and Curtis' marriage continues to take a backseat to Jackie's career; Mariah and Simone meet to get their friendship back on track, and Toya treats the women to a spa day to get ready for Hawaii.
57	9	"Hawaii Five Solo"	January 6, 2017	1.07
Simone and Cecil head off to Hawaii to celebrate their 20th anniversary; Lisa flies solo; Jackie arrives with some baggage of her own, and Mariah starts the trip off on the wrong foot.
58	10	"Hawaii Five-Uh Oh"	January 13, 2017	0.84
Darren still cannot be found; the group bares it all in couples therapy, but the exchange between Lisa and Heavenly proves anything but therapeutic; the group attends a traditional Hawaiian luau.
59	11	"Coconut Bras and Brawls"	January 20, 2017	0.87
Simone devises one more surprise for the women; Quad organizes a photo shoot for Jackie, and Mariah divulges what she really thinks of Quad and her past.
60	12	"Brazilian Bombshells"	January 27, 2017	0.80
Heavenly learns Lisa hasn't been entirely honest about their collaboration, and Quad bares it all at her 35th birthday party.
61	13	"The Devil is Busy"	February 3, 2017	0.77
Toya and Eugene's new accountant wants them to downsize their life; Jackie springs a romantic surprise on Curtis, and tempers flare at Toya's housewarming party.
62	14	"Breast Friends"	February 10, 2017	0.84
Heavenly faces a crisis of conscience; Lisa and Darren try to pick up the pieces, and Jackie's look book is almost ready.
63	15	"Reunion Part 1"	February 17, 2017	0.98
Host Andy Cohen reflects on some of the most season's biggest moments as the ladies of medicine reunite in part one of the reunion.
64	16	"Reunion Part 2"	February 24, 2017	0.96
Andy Cohen welcomes the husbands to tell their sides of the story.

=== Season 5 (2017–18) ===
Lisa Nicole Cloud departed as a series regular. Dr. Contessa Metcalfe joined the main cast. Married to Medicine also vacated its normal Sunday slot in favor of being aired on Friday evenings. It returned to its Sunday evening timeslot full-time in season 7.

No. overall	No. in season	Title	Original release date	U.S. viewers (millions)
65	1	"Waiting to Exhale"	November 5, 2017	1.48
Curtis' infidelity causes the ladies to question their own marriages; Eugene takes on extra shifts to pay back the IRS; Quad celebrates the grand opening of Dr. G's new practice, and Dr. Heavenly plans a special night for Dr. Jackie.
66	2	"Hot Off the Press"	November 10, 2017	0.80
Toya and Dr. Eugene discuss the lack of intimacy between them; Dr. Jackie continues to deal with her husbands infidelity; Quad plans her new business venture, and Dr. Simone tries to keep her marriage alive.
67	3	"Let's All Throw a Fit-Ni"	November 17, 2017	0.74
Dr. Jackie throws a Fit-Ni event; Dr. Simone and Cecile seek out professional help in hopes to save their marriage; Quad starts to feel taken advantage of by her husband while Toya, Dr. Contessa, and Dr. Heavenly sort out their own issues.
68	4	"Black Girl Magic or Black Girl Tragic?"	December 1, 2017	0.70
Quad still feels unappreciated by Dr. G; Dr. Jackie continues to deal with her personal life being public news, and Dr. Simone takes the girls on a trip to New Orleans.
69	5	"Guess Who's Coming to Nola?"	December 8, 2017	0.89
The ladies' trip in New Orleans continues as Dr. Simone takes the women on an excursion; Dr. Heavenly and Dr. Contessa still don't see eye-to-eye, and Toya surprises the group with a blast from the past.
70	6	"That Voodoo That You Do So Well"	December 15, 2017	0.88
The ladies try to salvage their experience on their last day in New Orleans in spite of Mariah's surprise visit; Dr. Simone and Dr. Jackie hold a forgiveness ceremony, and Quad faces a tough homecoming with Dr. G.
71	7	"Mama Drama"	December 22, 2017	0.76
Quad continues to work on her marriage with Dr. G; Dr. Simone and Cecile realize they need to be more expressive; Dr. Heavenly restarts her spiritual journey, and Mariah throws a Mother's Day Celebration dinner.
72	8	"Fly Girls & Low Riders"	January 5, 2018	1.05
Dr. Jackie faces Curtis for the first time since the infidelity became public; Quad takes some time away from her marriage; Dr. Contessa throws a 90s pool party, while Dr. Heavenly, Dr. Simone, and Mariah rehash what was said at the Mother's Day Celebration dinner.
73	9	"Breakdown or Breakthrough"	January 12, 2018	0.87
The tension between Dr. Heavenly and Mariah continues; Dr. Jackie explores the new side to Curtis; Dr. Simone's marriage is still a work in progress; Dr. Contessa deals with the aftermath of Ms. Renee, while Quad and Dr. G organise a martial focus group.
74	10	"Invitations and Revelations"	January 19, 2018	0.84
Dr. Heavenly takes over the annual couples trip; Dr. Simone and Cecil host their Kidz Force app party; Quad elevates her career by appearing on a televised cooking segment, and Mariah still refuses to apologize to Dr. Heavenly.
75	11	"The Heavenlywed Game"	January 26, 2018	0.87
The ladies and their husbands head to Barbados for their annual couples trip; tension between Quad and Dr. G arise; Dr. Heavenly plays nice towards Mariah, and Dr. Jackie gets a big surprise.
76	12	"Island Fever"	February 2, 2018	0.70
As the couples' trip continues, marriages are being mended and friendships are being tested; Dr. Heavenly takes pride in what she has planned, and Quad lashes out.
77	13	"Circle of Truth"	February 16, 2018	0.87
The trip to Barbados turns out to be a success; the ladies leave with hopes of their marriages and friendships growing for the greater good.
78	14	"D.N.A. D-Day"	February 23, 2018	0.77
Dr. Heavenly throws a DNA reveal to make up for the failed couples therapy; Dr. Jackie lets Curtis move back into the house; Quad and Dr. G have another focus group session, but doesn't end well; an argument between Quad and Toya leads Dr. Eugene to say something that does not sit well with the rest of the ladies.
79	15	"In the Black"	March 2, 2018	0.85
Toya and Dr. Eugene throw an "In the Black" party; Dr. Simone and Cecil celebrate their eldest son's graduating from high school, while Quad and Dr. G's marriage takes a turn for the worse.
80	16	"Reunion Part 1"	March 9, 2018	0.86
In the first part of the reunion, Toya is questioned about her sex life; Dr. Contessa defends Ms. Renee after all she has done; Mariah airs out her grievances with Dr. Heavenly, and Dr. Simone reveals the true state of her marriage.
81	17	"Reunion Part 2"	March 16, 2018	0.88
Mariah is left with a shock; Dr. Jackie gives an update on her marriage, and Quad spills the truth about how she feels about Dr. G.
82	18	"Reunion Part 3"	March 23, 2018	0.94
Dr. Simone and Cecil mend their marriage; Quad and Dr. G continue to fight, and the season ends with the ladies moving past their differences.

=== Season 6 (2018–19) ===
Mariah Huq rejoined the main cast. The show began in a Sunday timeslot before being moved around between Fridays and Sundays this season.

No. overall	No. in season	Title	Original release date	U.S. viewers (millions)
83	1	"Get Your Sexy Back"	September 2, 2018	0.74
Quad busy's herself with her new career when faced with a cheating scandal about Dr. G; Dr. Jackie and Curtis continue working on their marriage; Toya tries to keep herself and her husband fit with a new workout; Dr. Contessa juggles the life of a mother and doctor; Dr. Heavenly extends a crude apology towards Mariah, and Dr. Simone throws a Leather & Lace party for the ladies as she deals with Cecil's desire in spending the night together.
84	2	"I Don't Talk to Dentists"	September 9, 2018	0.83
Dr. Heavenly begins her anger management therapy after her latest tussle with Mariah; Dr. Simone and Cecile continue working on their marriage and building up to spending the night together; Quad keeps her distance from the group with her new career, and Toya throw Eugene a party to celebrate his promotion, only to be left disappointed after Dr. Contessa bailed on the event.
85	3	"Crabby Ladies"	September 16, 2018	0.85
Toya and Dr. Eugene look into buying a grander house seeing as they are clear of debts; Dr. Contessa deals with the struggles of her ailing father, and Dr. Heavenly throws an impromptu get together with the ladies and is surprised to see who turned up, and who popped off.
86	4	"Emotional Workout"	September 23, 2018	0.99
Quad finally reconnects with the ladies, admitting her wrong doings; Dr. Jackie throws the second annual "Fit-Ni"; Dr. Heavenly's animosity towards Mariah might be connected to her childhood, and Toya tries to work out her friendship with Dr. Contessa, only for it to escalate into another fight.
87	5	"Heavenly Homecoming"	September 30, 2018	1.08
Mariah comes to terms with her daughter growing up; Dr. Jackie tries to give Quad some perspective and support in dealing with her marriage to Dr. G; Dr. Contessa goes ahead with her double mastectomy, and Dr. Heavenly takes her therapists advice and travels to Miami to start her spiritual journey.
88	6	"A Room Without a View"	October 7, 2018	0.96
Dr. Heavenly's spiritual journey in Miami continues as she visits her childhood home to face her demons for the first time in years; Toya and Dr. Eugene envision their lives in their future dream home; Mariah lectures her daughter about the bird and the bees; Quad gets some friendly advice from her marriage counselling friends, and Dr. Contessa heads into hospital for her elective surgery.
89	7	"Out of Commission"	October 14, 2018	0.98
Dr. Contessa recovers from her elective surgery, feeling hopeful about her future; Toya and Dr. Eugene continue work on their dream home; Dr. Heavenly feels better about her childhood troubles, and Quad takes steps in separating herself from her marriage.
90	8	"Pajama Drama"	October 21, 2018	1.05
Dr. Heavenly continues her spiritual journey to control her anger; Mariah is confronted with the dilemma of moving; Dr. Simone and Cecil finally spend the night together, and Dr. Jackie throws a slumber party for the ladies, which results in a fight between Quad and Toya.
91	9	"Black Love"	October 28, 2018	1.07
In spite of the shock Mariah is processing about the possibility of moving states, she throws a "Black Love" party; Dr. Contessa avoids stepping out of her house; Dr. Jackie and Curtis celebrate their sixteen years of marriage, and Toya takes charge in organizing the annual couples trip.
92	10	"Trouble in Paradise"	November 4, 2018	1.38
The ladies embark on their annual couples trip to Antigua; tension between Dr. Contessa and Toya arise when Contessa thinks Toya might have hit her on purpose; Quad discovered some shady business done by Dr. G before the trip, while Dr. Heavenly and Mariah engage in another intense showdown.
93	11	"BBQs, Biscuit and Birth Control"	November 10, 2018	0.65
After the previous night, the ladies move past the dramas to enjoy the trip; Dr. Contessa looks ahead in repairing her friendship with Toya; Mariah tries to hold her opinions back about Dr. Heavenly and Quad, and Toya is pushed to a breaking point as she feels overwhelmed with multiple things.
94	12	"Heavenly's Second Chance"	November 17, 2018	0.65
While on a boat claimed to be all about love, Dr. Simone and Dr. Contessa get into an explosive argument; Mariah extends an olive branch towards Dr. Damon and Dr. Heavenly; Toya lets Dr. Heavenly host the couples therapy, in hopes of redeeming herself from the last trip, and the ladies leave their negativities from their marriages in the ocean.
95	13	"Sleep Number's Gone!"	December 1, 2018	0.62
Back in Atlanta, the ladies continue with their regular lives; Toya and Dr. Eugene check in on their dream home; Quad lives her new single life; Dr. Jackie treats Curtis like a king for the day; Dr. Contessa remains friendly with Toya; Dr. Heavenly figures out why she has so much anger towards Mariah, and Dr. Simone throws a house party to celebrate her and Cecil's reconciliation.
96	14	"Bottled Up Emotions"	December 7, 2018	0.68
Dr. Heavenly and Mariah talk out their past problems and hope to move forward positively; the tension between Toya and Dr. Contessa continues; Dr. Simone has trouble with letting go of the past, and Toya organises a winery trip for the ladies, only for it to be a bumpy ride.
97	15	"Docs on the Dock 2.0"	December 14, 2018	0.61
Toya and Dr. Eugene imagine the future with their kids once their dream house is finished; Dr. Jackie and Curtis decide on building their dream home, rather than trying to find one; Dr. Contessa spends time with her father, and Mariah throws "Docs on the Dock 2.0" to celebrate her husbands homecoming.
98	16	"Reunion Part 1"	December 21, 2018	0.74
In the first part of the reunion, Dr. Simone calls out Dr. Contessa for being a fraud; the beef between Mariah and Dr. Heavenly continues, which sparks the long rivalry between Quad and Mariah to life.
99	17	"Reunion Part 2"	January 6, 2019	1.47
Part two of the reunion continues as Andy tries to get to the bottom of Quad's scandalous accusations against Mariah. Then, the husbands tell their side of the story. Damon defends himself against cheating allegations, while Aydin sticks up for his wife. Later, Greg and Quad come face to face for one last confrontation.
100	18	"Reunion Part 3"	January 13, 2019	1.64
The reunion concludes in part three, as Quad and Greg face off, revealing the shocking truth about their marriage. Then, as the group deals with the fallout from Quad and Greg's confrontation, divisions are drawn. Later, Toya and Contessa's friendship comes to head.

=== Season 7 (2019–20) ===
No. overall	No. in season	Title	Original release date	U.S. viewers (millions)
101	1	"Open & Honest"	September 8, 2019	0.98
The ladies of medicine are back and the lines in the sand have been drawn. Dr. Heavenly and Dr. Jackie shake up the group with their Open and Honest podcast. Toya and Eugene struggle to finish construction on their dream home. Dr. Contessa’s traveling back and forth causes Scott to put on his single dad hat. Dr. Simone is happy to have her whole family back under one roof. The ladies try to come together at Heavenly’s Hollywood Glam party, but the night quickly turns into chaos.
102	2	"Stirring the Teapot"	September 15, 2019	0.88
Contessa’s pursuit of higher education continues to drive a wedge between her and Scott. Toya tries to put on a brave face and be there for her family after a devastating loss. Quad updates the ladies on her divorce. As the Twitter war between Simone and Heavenly comes to a fever pitch, Jackie throws an "Emergen-Tea" party to set everything right. Will the tea be served or spilled?
103	3	"Resuscitated Friendships"	September 22, 2019	1.00
Simone and Quad struggle to repair their friendship, but a breaking point may be near. Toya and her family struggle to heal from her miscarriage. Dr. Heavenly vents to Damon that Alaura is growing up too fast, but Simone wants her boys to grow up and clean up. Jackie and Simone hatch a surprise dinner with Heavenly and Mariah to work out their issues, but will Heavenly and Mariah run for the door when they discover the ambush?
104	4	"Ballin' on a Budget"	September 29, 2019	0.94
Jackie and Curtis have big plans to tear down and rebuild their home but will the budget fit their dreams? Contessa realizes that being away in Nashville is making her a distant memory to her family. Simone's friend Buffie throws a Fab and Frugal party where things get ugly when Toya is put on the spot about past money woes. Later, Toya throws a paint and sip for her birthday with a surprise twist that shocks her friends.
105	5	"Naked and Not Afraid"	October 6, 2019	0.88
Toya shocks the ladies with her idea of an art class. Heavenly decides not to tell Damon about Toya’s explicit birthday party. While Simone and Cecil give the boys a safe sex talk, Jackie does some sexual research for an exciting new project. As Toya and Eugene move into their new house, Contessa surprises Scott with some big moves of her own.
106	6	"Girl Code, Interrupted"	October 13, 2019	0.87
Hoping to get the ladies’ friendships back on track, Jackie invites the group to Savannah for a good old-fashioned girls’ trip. Feeling called out by Damon, Heavenly takes it out on Toya. Mariah goes after the whole group for perpetuating lies against her. By the end of a disastrous dinner, Jackie’s “friendship revival” is clearly on life support. Can she save this trip before it flat lines?
107	7	"Showdown in Savannah"	October 20, 2019	0.87
Any progress made during Revival Weekend in Savannah comes to a screeching halt after Mariah's meltdown on the bus. Dr. Jackie reaches her breaking point when she realizes that there are some problems she just can't fix. Contessa ponders Jackie's advice to pursue couples' counseling for herself and Scott. Mariah brings the receipts and the drug test results to prove Quad wrong, but do the rest of the ladies even want to know the truth?
108	8	"Food for Thought"	October 27, 2019	0.96
Jackie butts heads with Curtis over the rising costs of their home renovations. Contessa gives her dad a new smile courtesy of Dr. Heavenly. Simone and Cecil give Miles a wake-up call about his future. Quad celebrates her birthday and the launch of her new cookbook, but since she’s not on the guest list, Mariah celebrates Ramadan with her family. But when Quad shades her friends in her thank-you speech, will the festivities flat line?
109	9	"Contessa's Carnival"	November 3, 2019	1.10
Quad loses her mind when she allows Heavenly to set her up on a blind date. Dr. Jackie piles on her to-do list by renovating a new office. An overwhelmed Contessa throws a huge carnival birthday for her kids, hoping to make up for her mommy guilt. Buffie comes to Simone for help when she discovers a lump in her breast.
110	10	"Battle Down South"	November 17, 2019	1.06
Toya and Eugene invite Simone and Cecil over to tour their new forever home. Contessa and Scott face hard truths about their relationship in their first therapy session. Jackie hosts a party to launch her book “The Queen V” and outs some very personal information about Buffie. Later, everyone heads to Cabo for their couple's trip and have a boogie-down battle for the chance to win a penthouse suite.
111	11	"Bus-ted Cabo"	November 24, 2019	1.31
Buffie breaks her silence with Jackie for talking about her infertility, but Jackie hits back hard. Toya has a meltdown when the mini bus breaks down, forcing Simone and Cecil scramble to come up with a new couple's activity. Can they save the trip or will everything go loco, Mexican Messy Boots style?
112	12	"Revenge of the Sip and Paint"	December 1, 2019	1.28
The couples' trip to Cabo continues. Contessa and Scott continue to clash, putting their relationship on the brink. Jackie apologizes to Buffie for their fight the night before, but Buffie's far from over it. When the guys and the ladies have separate nights out, Quad gets a special girls night and Damon winds up in the doghouse with Heavenly.
113	13	"Swap Till You Drop"	December 8, 2019	1.17
In Cabo San Lucas, the group participates in a good old fashioned wife swap - with games on the beach! Heavenly's anger at Damon going to the strip club boils over. Contessa and Scott put on a brave face for the group, but their marriage issues are bubbling under the surface. Back in Atlanta, Quad's divorce proceedings inch closer to the finish line.
114	14	"Trouble in Spa-radise"	December 15, 2019	1.14
Back from Cabo, Quad celebrates her new found singledom with pal Cynthia Bailey, Toya starts planning her big housewarming for her new forever home, and Scott and Contessa have a major breakthrough in therapy. When Buffie throws a spa day to recharge the friendships, the last thing on the agenda is rest and relaxation.
115	15	"Arabian Nights"	December 22, 2019	1.22
As Jackie and Curtis begin renovations on their new home, Toya plans the ultimate housewarming party. Contessa and Scott finally come together on her decision to return to school in Nashville, while Heavenly battles with her decision to trust Alaura. Toya's Arabian Nights Housewarming party hits a snag when Buffie breaks down, Jackie steps away from the ladies, and Contessa and Mariah break the peace of Toya’s two-story closet in an epic showdown.
116	16	"Reunion Part 1"	December 29, 2019	1.46
Host Andy Cohen reflects on some of the seasons biggest moments as the ladies of medicine come together in part one of the explosive “Married to Medicine” Reunion. Quad discusses her current relationship status, while Simone surprises everyone with new information about Dr. G. Buffie confronts Dr. Jackie causing Heavenly to leap to her defense.
117	17	"Reunion Part 2"	December 29, 2019	1.26
Part two of the reunion continues as Andy welcomes the husbands to tell their side of the story. The ladies talk about their favorite shady moments from the season. Mariah discusses the allegations brought up against her. Dr. Simone and Dr. Jackie shock everyone when they reveal a rift in their friendship.
118	18	"Reunion Part 3"	January 5, 2020	1.32
The reunion concludes as Andy is joined by all the couples. Damon comes face to face with his actions in Cabo. Aydin and Mariah defend themselves. Toya opens up about her past love, upsetting Eugene. Contessa speaks her truth. After hashing out old and new issues, will the ladies be able to come together as a group again?

=== Season 8 (2021) ===
Mariah Huq and Quad Webb departed as series regulars. Anila Sajja joined the main cast.

No. overall	No. in season	Title	Original release date	U.S. viewers (millions)
119	1	"Breaking Out of the Bubble"	March 7, 2021	0.73
The ladies are back and life in the A has changed. With Covid and a racial reckoning happening all around the ladies continue to push forward. Toya, fully moved into her dream home struggles with Dr. Eugene working long hours at the hospital, while she’s stuck at home with the kids. Contessa and Scott bicker over working together in their new private practice office, while Jackie and Simone, struggle to understand their fractured friendship. Heavenly throws a 50th birthday party for Damon, but tensions flare when the group comes together for the first time in months.
120	2	"Graduation Snub"	March 14, 2021	0.71
Damon’s birthday comes crashing down as Simone and Heavenly’s feud breaks up the party. Toya discusses racism and diversity with her boys, Contessa builds out a new medical practice without Scott’s blessing. Heavenly helps a gossip blogger, Funky Dineva, put his money where his mouth is. Meanwhile, Anila confronts financial woes due to the pandemic. Heavenly and Simone come face to face to address their longstanding issues. Simone throws a graduation party for her son Michael, but is she acting like a high schooler when she doesn’t invite Jackie?
121	3	"New Year, Old Feuds"	March 21, 2021	0.84
Simone and the doctors continue the fight against Covid-19 on the front lines. Contessa vents to Jackie about her and Scott’s marital problems. Toya's frustration over homeschooling kids continues. Heavenly shares some shady gossip with Quad. During Anila’s traditional Rahki party for her friends and family, Toya and Contessa's old feud reignites.
122	4	"Home Court Advantage"	March 28, 2021	0.83
Simone prepares to send Michael off to college with one last Kids v. Adults basketball game. Anila wants to impress her parents with her new home, but momma isn’t impressed. Eugene calls Toya out for her recent cranky behavior. After an epic basketball showdown, Heavenly and Toya go into overtime, exchanging heated words.
123	5	"Friendship Foes & Marital Woes"	April 4, 2021	0.74
Toya distances herself from the group and hosts her own pool party, with surprise guests. Contessa and Scott vent to others about their marital woes. Heavenly encourages Jackie to mend fences with Simone. Anila and Kiran find their dream house turning into a nightmare. Simone and family send Michael off to college with a tearful goodbye.
124	6	"The Power of Crystals"	April 11, 2021	0.77
As the tension between former best friends Jackie and Simone reaches new heights, their husbands try and talk sense into them. Heavenly gets an unexpected call for a once-in-a-lifetime opportunity to help a young protester. Contessa enlists her niece Paris to throw a healing crystal event for the group. However, Toya brings along some blasts from the past to crash the party.
125	7	"Guess Who's Coming to Dinner"	April 18, 2021	0.84
The Doctors and Wives head to Washington DC for their most important medical mission yet as Ambassadors to the March on Washington. Reverend Al Sharpton and Ben Crump come by for dinner to discuss race relations in America. And tensions brew between the doctor's and the wives as Kari reveals to Toya and Anila that Heavenly and Contessa have been questioning their intelligence.
126	8	"Know Your Status DC"	April 25, 2021	0.86
Everyone gathers to relax by the pool prior to the March on Washington but can't drown out the drama when Toya makes a splash and confronts Heavenly and Contessa. The doctors take a stand against the pandemic and systemic racism when they perform covid testing at the March on Washington. Later, after a day of unity, the ladies head to dinner but ditch two of their own.
127	9	"Let the Emojis Fly"	May 2, 2021	0.80
After a successful medical mission in DC, the group heads home to Atlanta, reinvigorated. While Simone sees a patient with fibroids, Damon and Heavenly discuss the significance of the March on Washington with their kids during a family dinner. Toya confronts Anila about her finances. Contessa has a business consultation with a specialist before the grand opening of her new practice. Jackie plays peacemaker, hosting a dinner at her house, where Quad and Heavenly come head to head over an emoji incident.
128	10	"Ain't No Party Like a Self-Love Party"	May 9, 2021	0.67
Everyone's lives come to a halt when they have to isolate for 14 days. Toya discovers that Quad and Heavenly can't stop talking about her. Heavenly questions her son's investment decisions. Simone thinks about adding to the family. Jackie surprises the ladies with a porn star, but Toya gets the real surprise when Anila confronts her about the rumors Toya's been spreading.
129	11	"Club Q-uarantine"	May 16, 2021	0.81
Toya finds calm at home even as her friendships remain rocky. Simone gives her son Miles an ultimatum. Anila finds a new job in an unlikely place. Contessa opens her new practice, but it's the same old issues with Scott. Quad throws a game night party at her home, but the fun turns to drama, as Toya is forced own up to her past words about Quad's house.
130	12	"Holi Mess"	May 23, 2021	0.70
Anila and Quad bond over their shared issues with Toya. Simone and Contessa try to get to the bottom of Toya's problems with the group. Simone and Cecil host a couple's dinner, and are shocked to learn just how fragile Scott and Contessa's marriage is. Anila hosts a Holi event in hopes to heal some of the friendships within the group but things go Holi wrong when old feuds flare up.
131	13	"Chanel Charade"	May 30, 2021	0.65
Cecil and Eugene hang with Scott, who shares some interesting pics on his phone. Anila checks in on her house build and learns some upsetting news about her daughter. Heavenly and Zach put the final touches on their new rental property. Contessa uncovers some truths about herself. Simone plans a political town hall event, but things go off the rails when she discovers Lisa Nicole has been trying to push her aside.
132	14	"Scott's Secret"	June 6, 2021	0.76
The Town Hall Event is threatened when Simone learns some disturbing info about Lisa Nicole on the local news. Anila goes to Jackie for advice on her fractured friendship with Toya. Scott reveals a bombshell to Contessa that could undermine their entire marriage.
133	15	"Jekyll Island Part 1"	June 13, 2021	0.75
The ladies finally arrive to Jekyll Island. Heavenly and Toya come together in hopes of starting anew, while Contessa confides to Jackie and Quad about her suspicions of Scott. The ladies relax at dinner, but their peaceful night is soon disturbed when Anila stirs the pot over a bad deal with Lisa Nicole.
134	16	"Jekyll Island Part 2"	June 20, 2021	0.61
In the season finale of Married to Medicine, the ladies enjoy a day of sightseeing that leads to some close encounters. Anila finds a creative way to get her money from Lisa. Later, the men join the ladies for the last night on the island. The truth about Scott and Contessa finally comes out, but will it create more questions than answers?
135	17	"Reunion Part 1"	June 27, 2021	0.61
Host Andy Cohen reflects on some of the season's biggest moments as the ladies of medicine come together in part one of the three-part Married to Medicine Reunion. After sharing how Covid flipped their world upside down, Quad graces the stage and shakes things up with Toya when she brings up the heated Instagram live debate. Anila and Toya's friendship is tested, while Heavenly and Toya share a special kiss. Contessa reveals shocking information about her marriage to Scott.
136	18	"Reunion Part 2"	July 11, 2021	0.78
Scott crashes the stage when he hears Contessa's reveal their relationship status. The women question Scott's fidelity, and Contessa has a breakdown backstage. Simone and Jackie's friendship is questioned, while Simone is brought to tears over her hostile relationship with Heavenly. The men arrive to the stage and Scott is caught in a web of lies.
137	19	"Reunion Part 3"	July 18, 2021	0.72
The women join the stage and share how difficult this past year has been for all of their marriages. Dr. Eugene breaks down sharing the reality of life in the ER. The ladies joke about the shade they've thrown, but Quad takes it to the next level when she confronts Toya about the comments she's made about her home.

=== Season 9 (2022) ===
Quad Webb returned as a series regular.

No. overall	No. in season	Title	Original release date	U.S. viewers (millions)
138	1	"Bless This Mess"	July 10, 2022	0.69
139	2	"The Beauty Shop"	July 17, 2022	0.65
140	3	"Heavenly Intervention"	July 24, 2022	0.74
141	4	"Party Foul"	July 31, 2022	0.67
142	5	"An Axe to Grind"	August 7, 2022	0.66
143	6	"Viva Las Vegas!"	August 14, 2022	0.63
144	7	"Secrets & Sinners"	August 21, 2022	0.64
145	8	"The Oh! Shot"	August 28, 2022	0.64
146	9	"The Breaking Point"	September 4, 2022	0.68
147	10	"Holi-slay"	September 11, 2022	0.62
148	11	"Rumor Mill"	September 18, 2022	0.74
149	12	"The Streets Are Talking"	September 25, 2022	0.70
150	13	"Going Back, Back to Blue Ridge"	October 2, 2022	0.58
151	14	"Mountain Revival"	October 9, 2022	0.73
152	15	"Divine Intervention"	October 16, 2022	0.71
153	16	"Reunion Part 1"	October 23, 2022	0.83
154	17	"Reunion Part 2"	October 30, 2022	0.78
155	18	"Reunion Part 3"	November 6, 2022	0.47

=== Season 10 (2023–24) ===
Dr. Contessa Metcalfe and Anila Sajja departed as series regulars. Phaedra Parks and Lateasha Lunceford joined the main cast.

No. overall	No. in season	Title	Original release date	U.S. viewers (millions)
156	1	"Southern Sweet Tea"	November 5, 2023	0.60
157	2	"Heard It Through the Grapevine"	November 12, 2023	0.60
158	3	"Pamper Party Crasher"	November 19, 2023	0.54
159	4	"Revenge of the Bride"	November 26, 2023	0.59
160	5	"Resurrection Rejection"	December 3, 2023	0.60
161	6	"Whine Country"	December 10, 2023	0.56
162	7	"The Grapes of Wrath"	December 17, 2023	0.62
163	8	"Take a Napa"	January 7, 2024	0.55
164	9	"Good Vibrations"	January 14, 2024	0.56
165	10	"A Very Powerful Message"	January 21, 2024	0.62
166	11	"Not Phaedra's Type"	January 28, 2024	0.54
167	12	"Hilton Head Here We Come"	February 4, 2024	0.48
168	13	"Golf Cart Girls"	February 18, 2024	0.57
169	14	"The Med Gala"	February 25, 2024	0.58
170	15	"Reunion Part 1"	March 3, 2024	0.68
171	16	"Reunion Part 2"	March 10, 2024	0.61
172	17	"Reunion Part 3"	March 17, 2024	0.57

=== Season 11 (2024–25) ===
No. overall	No. in season	Title	Original release date	U.S. viewers (millions)
173	1	"Guess Who's Coming to Whitnik"	November 24, 2024	0.52
174	2	"Quad Gets Her Groove Back"	December 1, 2024	0.49
175	3	"Saddle Up, Cowgirls"	December 8, 2024	0.53
176	4	"Flannels and Fake Apologies"	December 15, 2024	0.53
177	5	"Blow Up on the Ranch"	December 22, 2024	0.47
178	6	"Rodeo Reckoning"	January 5, 2025	0.52
179	7	"Mean Girls Gala"	January 12, 2025	0.46
180	8	"Baby Birkin"	January 19, 2025	0.50
181	9	"From the White House to Key West"	January 26, 2025	0.49
182	10	"Battle of the Exes"	February 2, 2025	0.51
183	11	"Trouble on the Sandbar"	February 16, 2025	0.46
184	12	"Calm After the Storm"	February 23, 2025	0.65
185	13	"This Ain't the Playground"	March 2, 2025	0.55
186	14	"Choosing Sides"	March 9, 2025	0.62
187	15	"Duchess Toya and Her Royal Court"	March 16, 2025	0.63
188	16	"Reunion Part 1"	March 23, 2025	0.64
189	17	"Reunion Part 2"	March 30, 2025	0.60
190	18	"Reunion Part 3"	April 6, 2025	0.56

=== Season 12 (2025–26) ===
Dr. Heavenly Kimes, Phaedra Parks and Lateasha Lunceford departed as series regulars. However, Kimes continued to appear in a recurring capacity. Dr. Contessa Metcalfe rejoined the main cast. Dr. Mimi Sanders joined the main cast.

No. overall	No. in season	Title	Original release date	U.S. viewers (millions)
191	1	"Cocktails and Polo"	November 30, 2025	0.41
192	2	"Makeups and Breakups"	December 7, 2025	0.43
193	3	"The Player's Ball"	December 14, 2025	0.41
194	4	"Trouble at Serenity Villa"	December 21, 2025	0.44
195	5	"Baggage Check"	January 4, 2026	0.46
196	6	"All in the Family"	January 11, 2026	0.47
197	7	"Boots on the Ground"	January 18, 2026	0.45
198	8	"Girls Trip! Minus One"	January 25, 2026	0.40
199	9	"Unexpected Consequences"	February 1, 2026	0.55
200	10	"Med Gala Payback"	February 15, 2026	0.64
201	11	"What Happens in Jamaica Stays in Jamaica"	February 22, 2026	0.67
202	12	"The Five Love Languages"	March 1, 2026	0.59
203	13	"Couples Therapy and Paradise Problems"	March 8, 2026	0.61
204	14	"Med Gala Mishaps"	March 15, 2026	0.53
205	15	"Reunion Part 1"	March 22, 2026	0.55
206	16	"Reunion Part 2"	March 29, 2026	0.63
