= Married to Medicine: Houston =

American reality television series

- Genre: Reality television
- Created by: Mariah Huq
- Starring: Erika Sato; Monica Patel; Ashandra Batiste; Rachel Suliburk; Elly Pourasef
- Country of origin: United States
- Original language: English
- No. of seasons: 1
- No. of episodes: 10

Production
- Executive producers: Matt Anderson; Nate Green; Jim Fraenkel
- Running time: 41–43 minutes
- Production companies: FremantleMedia North America; Purveyors of Pop

Original release
- Network: Bravo
- Release: November 11 – December 30, 2016

Related
- Married to Medicine; Married to Medicine: Los Angeles

Married to Medicine: Houston is an American reality television series which premiered on November 11, 2016, on the Bravo cable network. It is the first spin-off of the Married to Medicine franchise. The series chronicles the lives of five women in Houston medical community where the Texas Medical Center is located, which is the largest medical center in the world. Four of the women are doctors themselves while one is a doctor's wife.

The cast of the series include Erika Sato (a plastic surgeon), Cindi Harwood Rose (CEO of a medical non-profit married to a plastic surgeon and world-famous portrait silhouette artist who uses surgical scissors to make accurate, detailed portraits), Monica Patel (a cardiologist), Ashandra Batiste (a general dentist), Rachel Suliburk (wife of a trauma surgeon, studying to become a registered nurse), and Elly Pourasef (an audiologist).

== Cast ==
- Dr. Erika Sato
- Dr. Monica Patel
- Dr. Ashandra Batiste
- Rachel Suliburk
- Dr. Elly Pourasef

== Episodes ==
No.	Title	Original release date	U.S. viewers (millions)
1	"Houston, We Have a Problem"	November 11, 2016	0.38
2	"Holi Moly"	November 11, 2016	0.35
3	"Boiling Point"	November 18, 2016	0.30
4	"Sorry Not Sorry"	November 25, 2016	0.35
5	"War at the Roses"	December 2, 2016	0.27
6	"Raging Dr. Elly"	December 9, 2016	0.26
7	"Monica in Waiting"	December 16, 2016	0.46
8	"Takes Two to Sparkle"	December 23, 2016	0.43
9	"I Left My Heart on San Antonio"	December 30, 2016	0.53
10	"An Indecent Proposal"	December 30, 2016	0.42

== Broadcast ==
The series premiered in Australia on Arena on March 4, 2017.
