= Quest for the Bay =

- Title card
- Directed by: Don Young
- Starring: Ken Albert, Jr. Rob Clark; Geoff Cowie; Paul Gossen; Marits Luinenburg; Kevin Mustard; RoseAnna Schick; Randal Shore
- Country of origin: Canada
- Original language: English
- No. of seasons: 1
- No. of episodes: 5

Production
- Executive producer: Jamie Brown
- Producer: Jamie Brown
- Production locations: Winnipeg, Manitoba, Canada
- Running time: 50 mins
- Production company: Frantic Films

Original release
- Network: History Television; Public Broadcasting Service
- Release: 6 January – 20 January 2002

Related
- Pioneer Quest: A Year in the Real West; Klondike: The Quest for Gold

Quest for the Bay was a Canadian documentary television series which aired on History Television and the Public Broadcasting Service in 2002. It is the second entry of producer Jamie Brown's "Quest series", which includes Pioneer Quest: A Year in the Real West (2001), Klondike: The Quest for Gold (2003), and Quest for the Sea (2004). Frank and Alana Logie, a couple who had previously participated in Pioneer Quest, made a cameo appearance during the first episode. It was the highest-rated program on History Television in 2002 and received favourable reviews from newspapers—most notably, the Edmonton Journal. RoseAnna Schick, the sole female crew member, wrote a personal account of the journey for Manitoba History later that year.

The five-part series was produced by Winnipeg-based Frantic Films and was filmed during the summer of 2001. It followed an eight-person volunteer team (seven men and one woman) as they attempted to recreate the journey made by fur traders of the Hudson's Bay Company during the 1840s by travelling from Winnipeg to Hudson Bay. The trip covered a distance of 1,200 kilometres (800 miles) and took the team though the heart of the Canadian wilderness. The crew members possessed only equipment used during the period, down to their food and clothing, and included a replica of a 12-metre (40 ft) wooden York Boat.

The trip took eight to twelve weeks to complete, required the members to row between 12 and 14 hours a day, and forced them to navigate dangerous rapids and portages over 1.6 kilometres (1 mi) long as they ferried 1,800 kilograms (4,000 lb) of cargo and furs down the rivers between Lake Winnipeg and Hudson Bay.

== Crew ==
- Ken Albert, Jr. – 25-year-old power grid worker
- Rob Clark – 45-year-old financial advisor
- Geoff Cowie – 36-year-old University of Winnipeg student. Cowie was the great-grandson of an 1860s Yorkman trader.
- Paul Gossen – 29-year-old wilderness guide
- Marits Luinenburg – 42-year-old carpenter and sailor
- Kevin Mustard – 45-year-old history teacher
- RoseAnna Schick – 33-year-old publicist. She is the sole female crew member.
- Randal Shore – 25-year-old university student

== Episodes ==
No.	Title	Original release date
1	"The Company of Adventurers"	January 6, 2002
The crew of explorers is selected, and they begin the first week of their journey, facing the same hardships the original crew would have had to deal with in 1840s Canada.
2	"The Lake"	January 7, 2002
The explorers begin the task of rowing the York boat to Hudson Bay under the hot summer sun, finally arriving at the Cree community of Norway House at the top of Lake Winnipeg.
3	"The Great Portage"	January 13, 2002
Setting out into the northern wilderness, the adventurers fight their way past the beaver dams and leech-filled sloughs on the Echimamish River. But on finally reaching the 1,600-metre Robinson Portage, the group's spirit is tested by a torrential downpour of rain.
4	"Beyond Hell's Gate"	January 20, 2002
The team reaches the magnificent Hayes River, but rapids with razor-sharp rocks damage the boat and a struggle for the leadership breaks out.
5	"To the Edge of a Frozen Sea"	January 20, 2002
The team is still 290 kilometres (180 mi) from York Factory, but their boat has been destroyed, the arctic cold is closing in, and their food is running low. They must battle illness and distrust to complete their quest to re-live the epic journey of the Hudson's Bay Company fur traders.
