= Local Live =

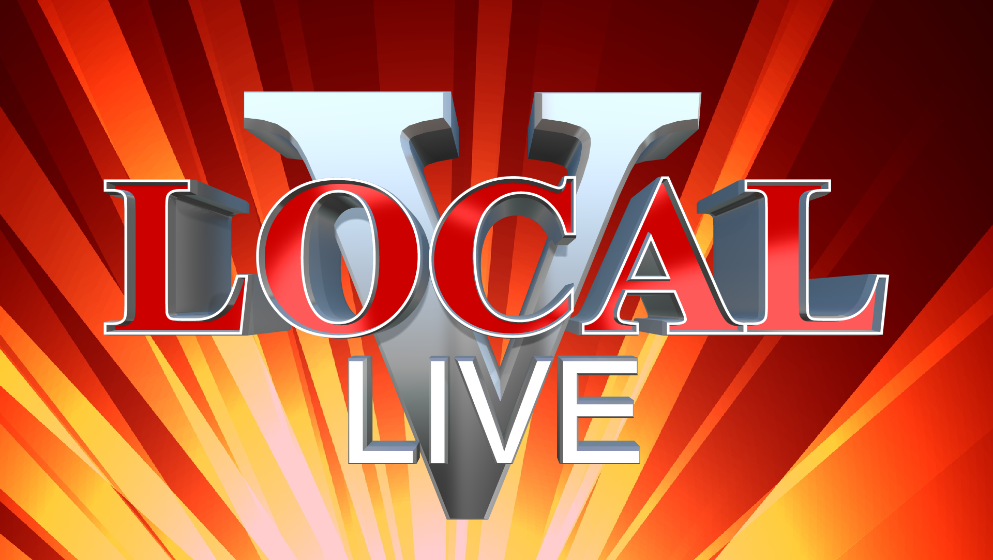
- Also known as: Local Live : Canada's very own reality show and original music competition Local Live II (season 2) Local Live III Barrie (season 3) Local Live IV : Simcoe County (season 4) Local Live V : Simcoe County (season 5)
- Genre: Reality television
- Created by: Steve Major
- Directed by: Steve Major (2009–2012, 2014-); Steve McEwon (2013)
- Presented by: Tara Dawn Winstone (2009); Robyn Gerson (2009); Steve Major (2009-)
- Judges: Michael Jack (2009–15); Jazzfeezy (2009–13, 2015); Lorraine Lawson (2012); Edwina Douglas (2012); Robyn Gerson (2013); Marj Malcolm (2014); Michelle Blade (2014); Drop Daniels (2014-15); Amanda Strachan (2015)
- Theme music composer: Steve Major
- Country of origin: Canada
- Original language: English
- No. of seasons: 5
- No. of episodes: 24

Production
- Executive producer: Steve Major
- Producers: Steve Major (2009-); Steve McEwon (2013); Mitchell Lapointe (2014-2015); Caitlind Lusty (2015-)
- Running time: 58 minutes
- Production companies: The Major Entertainment Group; Rogers Television; The City of Barrie

Original release
- Network: Rogers Television
- Release: January 10, 2013 – present

Local Live is a music based competition created by Steve Major, produced by The Major Entertainment Group, and was previously distributed by Rogers Media. The project conceived by Major began as a live showcase of local Barrie area musicians in 2009. Local Live first aired on Rogers TV in Barrie ON, in January 2013. The series now in its 5th season airs across Simcoe County to more than 110,000 homes.

The concept of Local Live is to find new solo recording artists who write and perform their own original music, with the winner being determined by a panel of industry professionals and viewers worldwide.

Local Live wields a panel of industry professionals who critique and coach each contestants song and performance . The original judges were gold and platinum award-winning record producer Michael Jack, music producer Jazzfeezy, pop singer / Recording Artist Lorraine Lawson, and music/vocal coach Edwina Douglas. The judging panel for the most recent season included Michael Jack, Jazzfeezy, and introduced international supermodel Amanda Strachan, and television personality Drop Daniels. The shows creator, recording artist Steve Major has hosted the show since it began in 2009. There have been 4 winners of the show to date: Tori Hathaway, Kid Bliz & Chubz (Rolergang), Carley K, and Megan Baillie.

== History ==
Local Live expanded for season 5 with an audition tour across Simcoe County including Barrie, Orillia, Collingwood, Alliston, Borden and Midland. In addition, Local Live would broadcast on 4 additional stations.

== Judges and hosts ==
=== Judges ===
Local Live originally had four judges all from different aspects of the music industry. Michael Jack, Jazzfeezy, Edwina Douglas, and Lorraine Lawson were the first judges on the program.

For season 3, radio personality Robyn Gerson was brought in as a judge, leaving only 3 judges at the panel with Lorraine Lawson quitting the show and Edwina Douglas not being asked to return. In season 4, Michelle Blade, a singer who aimed to expand strict musical borders, replaced Jazzfeezy while he spent the year away from the show working on Grammy Award-winning recording artist T.I.'s newest single "I ain't goin". Robyn Gerson left the show after season 3 and was replaced with dance veteran, Marj Malcolm just in time for season 4. Drop Daniels, a fourth judge was re-introduced to the panel for season 4. Season 5 marked the return of Jazzfeezy reclaiming his judge seat back from Blade while Marj Malcom was replaced with international supermodel Amanda Strachan.

Local Live's first season was co-hosted by on air radio personalities Tara Dawn Winstone, Robyn Gerson and Steve Major. Winstone and Gerson quit after one season, leaving Major to emcee the show on his own starting with season two.

=== In-House mentors ===
Beginning in season 4, a permanent mentor was brought in before the taping of the live shows to help arrange the contestants original works, and prepare them for their final performance. Renee Cingolani joined the series in 2014, mentoring and music directing from season 4 to present. Previous guest-mentors have included Tori Hathaway (Local Live Season II winner) and Carley-K (Local Live Season IV winner).

=== Selection process ===
In a series of rounds, the shows producers and judges pick the eventual winner out of all who audition.

=== Contestant eligibility ===
The eligible age to audition for Local Live is currently 8 years old. The contestants must be legal Canadian residents, cannot have advanced to the final top 3 of the competition in previous seasons, and must not hold any current recording or talent representation contract by the semi-final stage.

=== Initial auditions ===
Contestants go through 2 rounds of cuts. The first round is a short audition alone, with or without an instrument in front of the show's producers. Those selected advance to a filmed audition in front of the judges, which select footage is included on the television program. Contestants selected by the judges are sent to the semi-final round in their own respective cities. Between 8-10 people in each city may make it to the semi-finals.

== Season Overview ==
=== Local Live V ===
Local Live 's 5th season began filming late October 2014. The show expanded to include all of Simcoe County with stops in Barrie, Orillia, Collingwood, Midlan, and Alliston/Borden. Signing on as Local Live 's newest judge was international supermodel Amanda Strachan. Returning judges included Michael Jack, Jazzfeezy, and Drop Daniels.

== Local Live Award ==
The Local Live Award was created to acknowledge individuals who have contributed, assisted, or positively affected the growth and/or development of musical artists. The winner of the Local Live Award is chosen through a nomination process whereby support material is submitted to the shows producers. Local Live 's producers sort through all submitted material and select the nominee they feel is most deserving.
