= Video Zonkers =

Video Zonkers is a television reality comedy show aired on AXN Asia. The show features primarily bloopers, accidents, mix ups, reckless and unintelligent behaviour caught on tape.

== Description ==
Video Zonkers is a compilation of videos that feature ridiculous stunts, fights, riots, crashes and peculiar behaviour caught on tape. The show is produced by the producers of the very successful show Whacked Out Sports. It originally ran on December 6, 2007 and it is still running. A typical episode run time is about 30 minutes and some 104 episodes have been made so far. The show is narrated by an animated host called ZONKER. The same voice is also used to narrate Whacked Out Sports. Similar to their previous show the producers used cartoonish stock sound effects such as screams, punches, crashes, and groaning men sounds after scenes of crashes, falls, fights or other incidents are shown. The show features several segments including Zonker Zone, Zonker Files, Video Zonkers Passport, Celebrities You've Never Heard Of and Don't try this at home.

== International syndication ==
Country	Channel
(United Nations) Asia	AXN Asia
Philippines	TV5
Malaysia	TV9
Russia	2x2

== See also ==
- World's Most Amazing Videos
- Whacked Out Sports
