= Married to Medicine: Los Angeles =

- Genre: Reality television
- Created by: Mariah Huq
- Starring: Imani Walker; Shanique Drummond; Britten Cole; Asha Kamali-Blankinship; Noelle Reid; Jazmin Johnson; Kendra Segura; Lia Dias
- Country of origin: United States
- Original language: English
- No. of seasons: 2
- No. of episodes: 18

Production
- Executive producers: Matt Anderson; Nate Green; Heather Crowe; Sean Rankine; James Smith-Hill
- Camera setup: Multi-camera
- Production companies: FremantleMedia North America; Purveyors of Pop

Original release
- Network: Bravo
- Release: March 6, 2019 – July 12, 2020

Related
- Married to Medicine; Married to Medicine: Houston

Married to Medicine: Los Angeles is an American reality television on Bravo cable network, the second spin-off of the Married to Medicine franchise. The show premiered as an extra episode of the parent series of Married to Medicine, on March 6, 2019, with the show scheduled on Sundays afterward beginning March 10, 2019. The series chronicles the lives of six women in the Los Angeles area who are either female doctors or doctors' wives. The first season's cast consisted of Dr. Britten Cole, Dr. Imani Walker, Dr. Noelle Reid, Asha Kamali-Blankinship, and Shanique Drummond, with Jazmin Johnson in the supporting role of friend.

In December 2019, Bravo announced that Married to Medicine: Los Angeles would return for a second season. Season 2 premiered on May 3, 2020, with Dr. Kendra Segura and Lia Dias joining the cast, replacing Dr. Reid and Kamali-Blankinship, and Johnson having been promoted to main cast.

== Cast ==
- Dr. Britten Cole
- Shanique Drummond
- Asha Kamali-Blankinship (season 1)
- Dr. Noelle Reid (season 1)
- Dr. Imani Walker
- Lia Dias (season 2)
- Jazmin Johnson (season 2; recurring season 1)
- Dr. Kendra Segura (season 2)

== Episodes ==
=== Series overview ===
Season	Episodes	Originally released	
Season	Episodes	First released	Last released
1	8	March 6, 2019	April 21, 2019
2	10	May 3, 2020	July 12, 2020

=== Season 1 (2019) ===
No. overall	No. in season	Title	Original release date	U.S. viewers (millions)
1	1	"ATL in La La Land"	March 6, 2019	1.13
2	2	"Ghost of Girlfriends Past"	March 10, 2019	1.01
3	3	"Jazzy's Dollhouse Brunch"	March 17, 2019	1.00
4	4	"Truth Bombs"	March 24, 2019	0.96
5	5	"The Roof Is on Fire"	March 31, 2019	1.02
6	6	"Defective Crystal Ball"	April 7, 2019	1.07
7	7	"Dog Tags of Summer"	April 14, 2019	0.93
8	8	"A Bond That Will Never Be Broken"	April 21, 2019	0.76

=== Season 2 (2020) ===
No. overall	No. in season	Title	Original release date	U.S. viewers (millions)
9	1	"Going Going Back Back to Cali"	May 3, 2020	0.67
10	2	"Prepare for Backlash"	May 10, 2020	0.73
11	3	"Housewarming Home Wreckers"	May 17, 2020	0.80
12	4	"Hollywood Night of Terror"	May 24, 2020	0.75
13	5	"Homecoming Queens"	May 31, 2020	0.50
14	6	"From Taking Notes to White Coats"	June 14, 2020	0.49
15	7	"Straight Outta Beverly Hills"	June 21, 2020	0.44
16	8	"Sis-Cation"	June 28, 2020	0.41
17	9	"Queens of the Desert"	July 5, 2020	0.43
18	10	"Christmas in Beverly Hills"	July 12, 2020	0.48
