= Bear Whisperer =

- Starring: Blaine Anthony
- Country of origin: United States
- Original language: English
- No. of seasons: 11
- No. of episodes: 143

Production
- Production location: North America
- Running time: 30 minutes
- Production company: Nature Productions

Original release
- Network: Sportsman Channel (2011–2012); Pursuit Channel (2013–2023)
- Release: 1 January 2011 – 23 December 2022

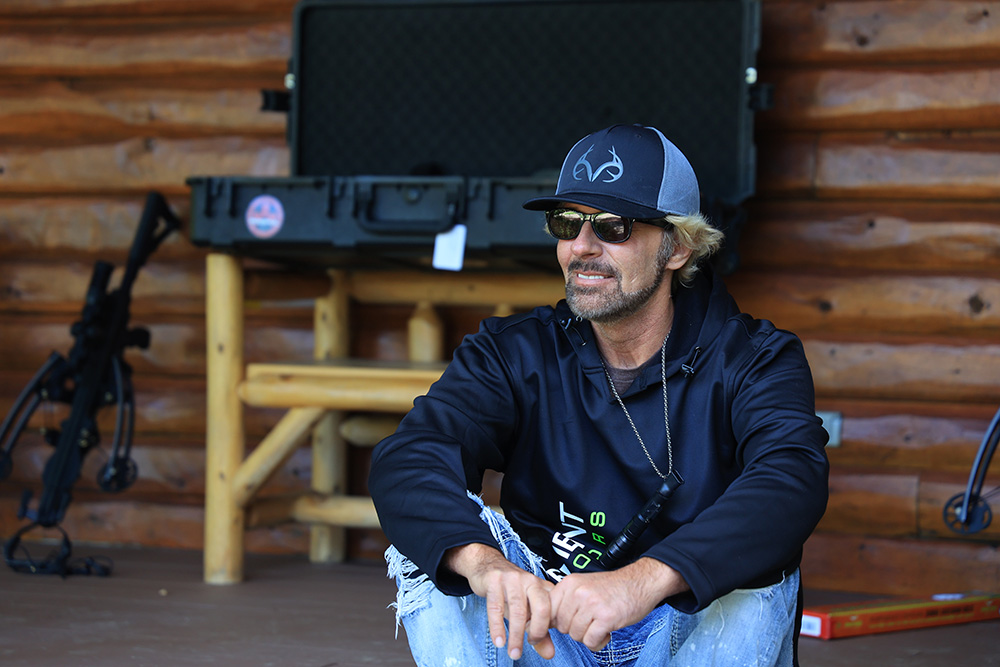
Blaine Anthony the Bear Whisperer

Bear Whisperer is a weekly based reality television series that focuses on black bear conservation (Ursus americanus). It aired on Sportsman Channel and ran from 1 January 2011, to 21 June 2012. "Bear Whisperer" pertains to a person named Blaine Anthony. It has been currently running on Pursuit Channel from July 2013.

== History ==
Anthony used to provide bear hunts to hunters for seven years. Through this, Anthony acquired knowledge on the black bear, the world of hunting and on all types of bears from different regions. As many bears are killed while hunting, bear conservation has become a must. Thus the TV serial Bear Whisperer started with a view to conserving the bears.

== Format ==
Bear Whisperer is a documentary-style reality show where Blaine Anthony goes into bear dens and tags bears, discusses the reasons of bear attacking and relocates nuisance bears from campgrounds. In the program, Anthony travels the forests around North America showing different process of hunting bears and conserving them.

The program is produced by Nature Productions. The show focuses on tagging and tracking bears, relocating them as well as on bear hunting techniques, equipment and secrets. Randy Cross, the Maine bear biologist, was with Anthony in most of the programs around North America.

== Reception ==
The show won the Sportsman Choice Award in 2012.

== Transmissions ==
Series	Start date	End date	Episodes
1	1 January 2011	26 March 2011	13
2	29 March 2012	21 June 2012	13
