= Black Love (2015 TV series) =

Television series

#BlackLove
- Genre: Reality television
- Country of origin: United States
- Original language: English
- No. of seasons: 1
- No. of episodes: 10

Original release
- Network: FYI
- Release: December 8, 2015 – February 9, 2016

#BlackLove is an American reality television series that premiered on the FYI cable channel on December 8, 2015. The show follows the personal lives of five black women—Monet Bell, Tennesha Wood, Jahmil Eady, Laree Thomas, and Cynthia Branch—living in New York City as they explore the foundations of fulfilling romantic relationships. The women are guided by relationship experts Damona Hoffman and Jack A. Daniels, who guide them through a series relationship workshops to help them get back to dating and finding the best prospective significant others. The series is not affiliated with the docuseries Black Love (2017).

== Premise ==
The concept of the show stems from the hashtag of the same name that trended in support of the marriage of two black participants, Vaughn Copeland and Monet Bell, on the American reality television show Married at First Sight. According to Gena McCarthy, the Vice President of FYI (the network on which #BlackLove and Married at First Sight both aired), "We are always looking at what's next, and often it's our viewers who pave the way. This show's unique title and concept was created in that spirit and stems from the overwhelming social media use of the hashtag during the first season of Married at First Sight, as viewers rooted for the marriage of Monet Bell and Vaughn Copeland."

== Conclusion ==
The final episode of #BlackLove, "Sealing the Deal," broadcast on February 9, 2016. There are no publicly known plans to continue the series.
