= Whacked Out Sports =

American reality television series

- Created by: Mark O'Brien
- Music by: Devin Powers

Production
- Executive producers: Mark O'Brien; Harley Tat
- Production companies: Whack One Entertainment; Mighty Oak Entertainment; Trifecta Entertainment & Media

Original release
- Network: Syndication
- Release: September 7, 2006 – present

Related
- Whacked Out Videos; Whacked Out

Whacked Out Sports is an American syndicated reality television series which features professional and amateur videos of sports-related mishaps, crashes and bloopers. The show has a comedic theme and uses a narrative voiceover to highlight aspects of the clips. Whacked Out Sports, created and produced by Mark O'Brien, founder of Mighty Oak Entertainment and distributed by Stream Go Media, features 170 episodes and has been in syndication on Fox broadcasting since 2006.

== Subject matter ==
The show consists entirely of short video clips featuring sports-related stunts and odd sporting events. The clips are accompanied by irreverent and wacky narration which is intended to present sometimes shocking images in a humorous manner.

High points from the clips are generally replayed several times for maximum effect, a technique also used on the similar show MXC. The narrator, Tom Gottlieb (known for, and playing a similar role to, "Cookie Masterson" from the video game series You Don't Know Jack), uses a juvenile commentary to help create the lighthearted nature of the show; for example, stating "he's using his noggin to steer the toboggan" when referring to a luge accident. Another trademark feature of the show are the often cartoonish stock sound effects such as screams, punches, crashes, and groaning men sounds after scenes of crashes, falls, fights or other incidents are shown.

Because of the show's mature content, it contains a special content disclaimer at the beginning of each episode and is usually aired in late night hours.

The clips for Whacked Out Sports are collected from videos taken by various sources around the world.

As the series continued, newer episodes would recycle clips from older episodes, as most of the clips shown appear to be from now-outdated VHS camcorders that were common when the series began, but obsolete only a few years later with the advent of smartphones. Newer episodes of the series also include skits featuring bikini models doing various wacky and sexually suggestive activities.

== International distribution ==
The series began airing in the United Kingdom on the Five USA channel in February 2008. It is also broadcast in South Africa on DSTV and in Estonia on TV6 where it is shown along with Maximum Exposure and other similar themed shows under the title Meeletu Maailm. It was due to air in Australia on 7Two daily at 7pm from November 17, 2009, with the next season due to appear over the Australian non-ratings period twice a week on Channel Seven from December 1, 2009. In India and Pakistan, it airs on AXN. The series is also broadcast in the Netherlands too Stom, Stommer, Stomst! on RTL 7. It is also broadcasting on Mediacorp Channel 5 and JHM Network. In South Korea, under the name Dolbal Ajjilhan Sports(돌발! 아찔한 스포츠 ; Flash! Giddy Sports) from 2009 ~ 2011 on OBS. and in the Philippines, the series began airing on AKTV on IBC-13 Every Monday at 7:00 pm from April 2, 2012.

== Spin-off ==
In January 2008, Mighty Oak Entertainment's subsidiary Whack One Entertainment began airing a spin-off called Whacked Out Videos hosted by Tom Gottlieb. A revival series entitled "Whacked Out" produced by Stream Go Media and starring Jessie Godderz was announced in 2022. The new show is scheduled to debut in 2023.

== See also ==
- World's Most Amazing Videos
- Most Extreme Elimination Challenge (MXC)
- Video Zonkers
- Maximum Exposure
