= Klondike: The Quest for Gold =

2003 Canadian documentary TV series

Klondike: The Quest for Gold is a Canadian documentary television series, which aired in 2003 on The History Network. It follows the journey of five modern-day people as they recreate the journey made over 100,000 people during the Klondike Gold Rush. They are supplied with 1897 period-appropriate clothing and gear, and make the journey from Dyea, Alaska to Dawson City, Yukon. They are provided with three months of food, mining equipment, and a knockdown boat, all totaling 3000 pounds, carried on their shoulders or in period-appropriate backpacks.

It is part of the "Quest" series from producer Jamie Brown, which also included Pioneer Quest: A Year in the Real West (2001), Quest for the Bay (2002), and Quest for the Sea (2004).

== Cast ==
- Sebastien Racine: 19 years old, youngest of the group
- Dave Delnea: 22 years old, expedition photographer
- Andria Bellon: Granddaughter of Klondike can-can girl
- Rick Unrau: Jack of all trades
- Joe Bishop: 41 years old, songwriter and oldest of the group

Tlingit Aboriginal Pack Men "Packers" were hired to assist carrying the gear.

- Ron Chambers: Bush guide
- Ralph James: Descendant of a Packer
- Ron Altin: Descendant of a Packer

== Episodes ==
No.	Title	Original release date
1	"Chilkoot Trial"	2 February 2003
A team of modern adventurers re-enacts the trek to the gold fields of the Klondike..
2	"Lake Lindeman"	9 February 2003
The team falls behind and begins to run out of food.
3	"Yukon River"	16 February 2003
The men leave Andria's personal gear behind, as the food dwindles and the cross Chilkoot Pass.
4	"Dawson"	23 February 2003
The team reaches Dawson City, 72 days into the journey - starving.
