= Kampung Quest (web series) =

- Genre: Reality-show
- Created by: Feisal Azizuddin
- Opening theme: "Live The Adventure" by Phil Larson; "This Adventure Is For You" by Amanda Oei
- Country of origin: Malaysia
- Original language: English
- No. of seasons: 3
- No. of episodes: 21

Production
- Executive producers: Iskander Azizuddin; Feisal Azizuddin
- Producers: Ghif Suleiman; Jaffrin Shahrom; Rethish Raghu
- Production locations: Kuala Lumpur, Malaysia
- Running time: approx. 30 minutes
- Production companies: Feisk Productions; Feisk Sdn Bhd

Original release
- Network: Online
- Release: January 1, 2014 – 2016

Kampung Quest is a reality game show produced in Malaysia. In the show, contestants are divided into two camps; one isolated in the jungle and the other in a 'kampung' (village) house. Each day the camps compete in challenges where they can earn survival items. The contestants are progressively eliminated at a campfire where members of the camp can vote off one another until only one final contestant is left and is crowned 'Winner of Kampung Quest'.

The show concept was created by Feisal Azizuddin in May 2013, with show production starting in June 2013. The show is largely set outdoors in Malaysia.

Kampung Quest is an independent production by two brothers, Feisal and Iskander Azizuddin. The show features 10 urban Malaysians who compete against each other in physical, mental and social challenges, called ‘quests'.

== Overview ==
10 urban Malaysians, known in the show as Urbanites are placed in a rural setting and put through a series of quests over a period of 7 days. The urbanites are split into two camps of five; Merantau Camp and Merapi Camp. Both camps are set daily challenges, 'quests', which their team must win if they wish to sleep the night in the kampung house. The losing camp has to stay outside overnight as well as vote one of their own out of the show. Each day consists of three key events; the Reward Quest, the Elimination Quest and The Campfire. In the Reward Quest, both camps compete to be rewarded with sponsored prizes. In the Elimination Quest, both camps compete for basic necessity items (shampoo, inflatable pillow) and to be exempted from attending the campfire where the losing camp will have to vote out one member from their camp.

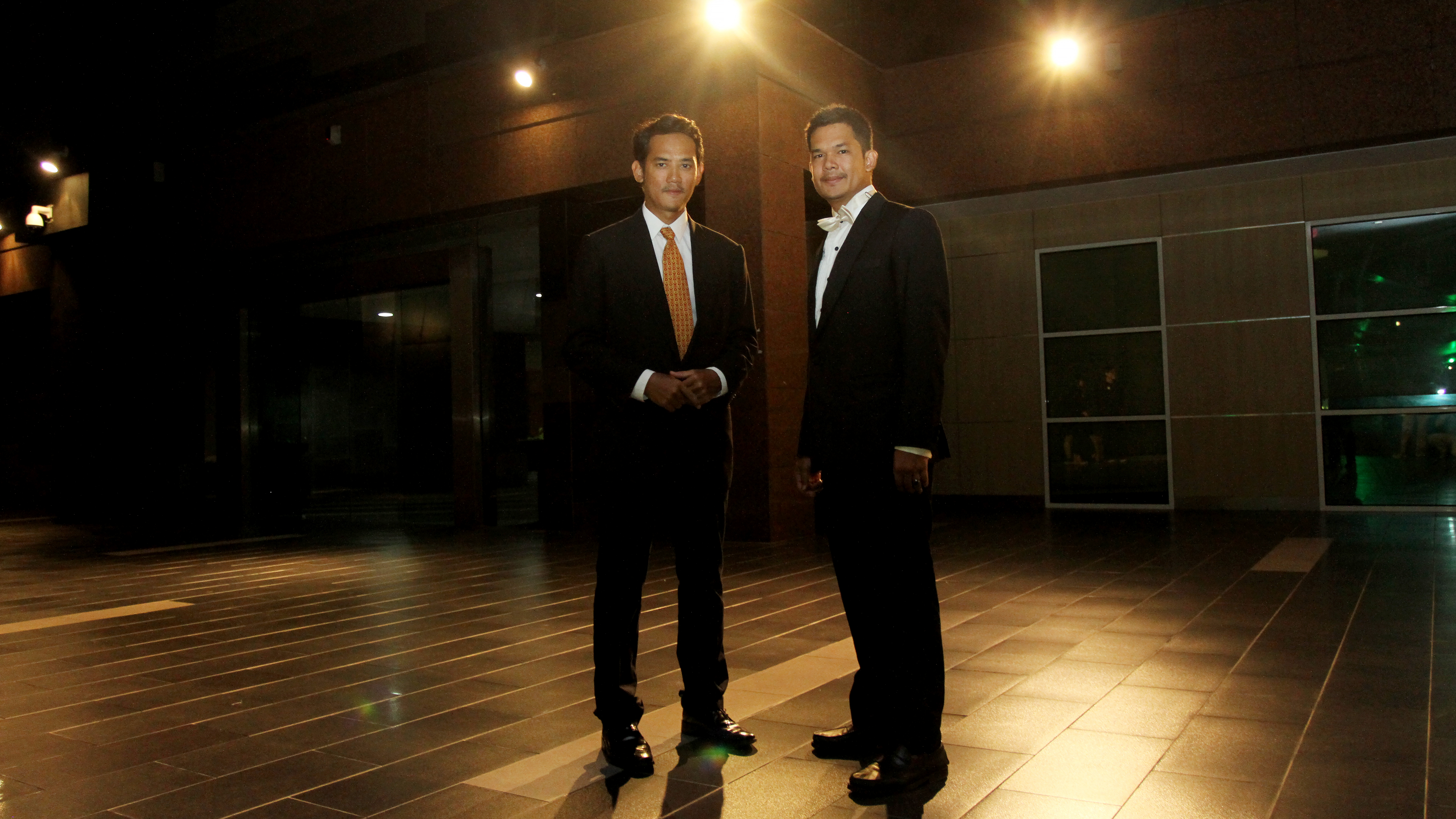
Feisal & Iskander Azizuddin, Creator & Executive Producer of Kampung Quest

=== Contestants ===
Contestants for each season are selected from applicants who have to submit a 15-second video describing why they should be on the show. The applicants are shortlisted to 20 potential contestants who are then interviewed by the producers before further narrowed down to the final 10. Contestants are chosen based on several criteria such as image, personality, communication skills as well as the ability to speak English. Contestants on the show are referred to as 'Urbanites' indicating their urban background and city upbringing.

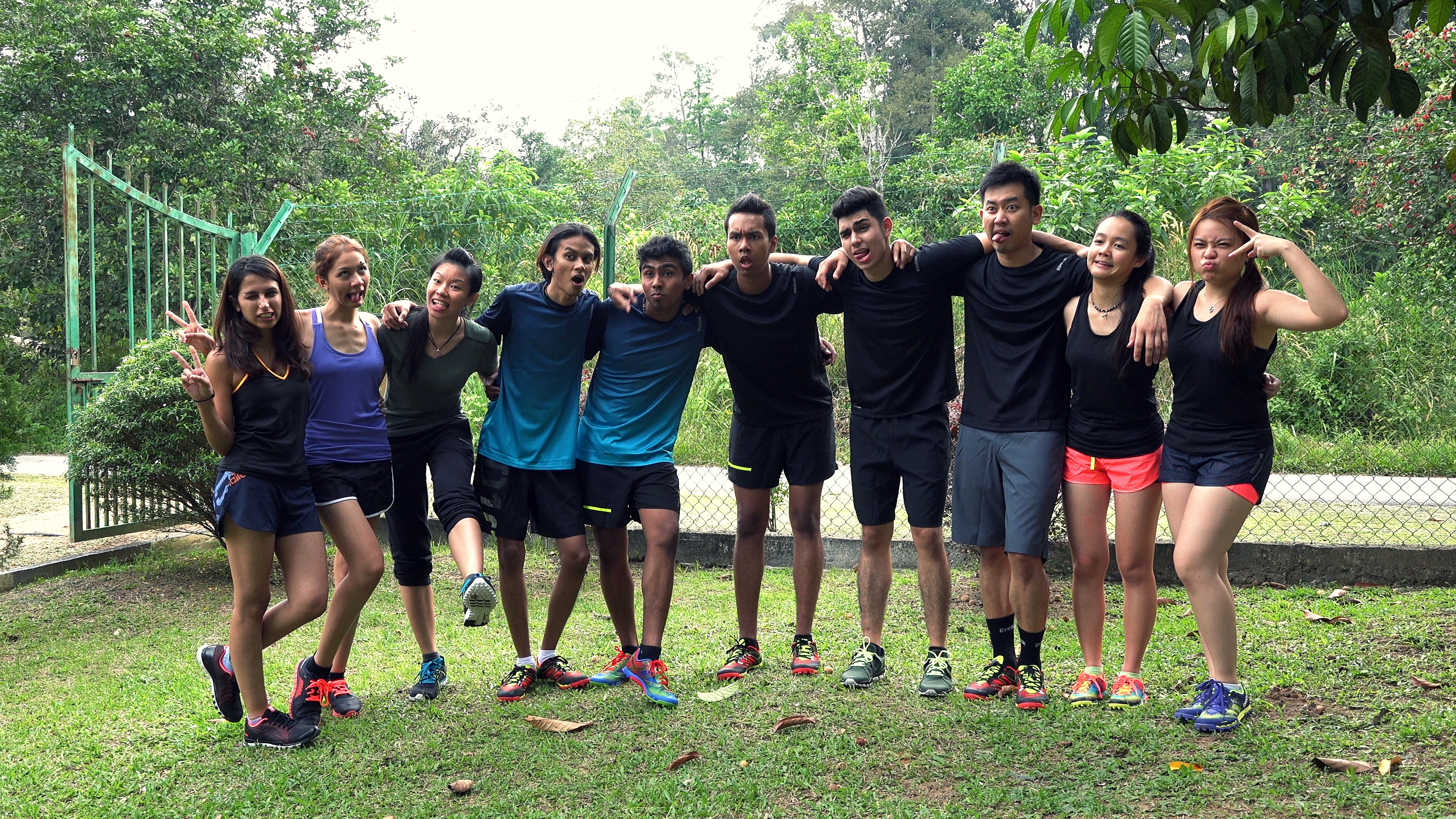
The Urbanites of Season 2

=== Camps ===
10 urbanites are divided into 2 camps - a mixture of male and female. The camps compete against each other until later in the game, they compete individually.

=== Quests ===
Each day there are 3 quests

- Physical quest: Tests the urbanites' strength, agility and team work.
- Mental quest: Tests the urbanites' thinking, logic and mind over matter.
- Social quests: Puts the urbanites' in social conundrums by pitting them against fellow camp members

=== The Campfire ===
The losing camp of the elimination quest (usually the final quest of the day) will have vote out one of their camp members. Camps who attend the campfire (the losing camp) will have to live in the Malaysian jungle for a night, until the next elimination quest.

== Production ==
=== Creators & Producers ===
The show was created by Feisal Azizuddin with his brother, Iskander Azizuddin as Executive Producer. For the first season, Ghifari Suleiman was a consultant producer on the show.

The concept of Kampung Quest began in early 2013. A detailed episode script and challenge obstacles breakdown was complete in May 2013. Feisal and Iskander had previously been producing corporate and wedding videos. Being a reality show fan, Feisal developed a reality show concept inspired by Survivor, Amazing Race and Big Brother. The word 'kampung' means village in the Malaysian language.

Prior to filming, the production crew carried out locations and quests planning, and also simulated the quests. Principal photography was completed by September 2013. Feisal and Iskander opted for guerrilla filmmaking. Kampung Quest was filmed 30 minutes away from Kuala Lumpur, on the outskirts of Gombak. The 'kampung' house was part of a 'kampung' retreat called Alang Manja. The first season of Kampung Quest was filmed by a crew of 6 people.

Kampung Quest cost approximately RM150,000 to produce. It was produced with no outside funding.

=== Soundtrack ===
The theme song for Kampung Quest is titled "This Adventure is for You", composed by Amanda Oei.

The soundtrack for Season 2 was composed by American composer, Phil Larson. Larson was contacted by Iskander and Feisal after seeing his compositions on AudioJungle.net.

=== Contestants ===
The show was initially set to feature 8 contestants. Contestant submissions were opened from July to August 2013.

Towards the end of August, due to a large number of applications, this was changed 10 contestants. Most of the contestants reside in Kuala Lumpur, the capital city of Malaysia.

The producers shortlisted suitable candidates of whom each were interviewed before selecting the final 10 urbanites. The selected contestants ranged from students to young working adults from diverse cultural backgrounds.

=== Host ===
Kampung Quest is hosted by Jeremy Teo, a Malaysian radio deejay who joined the production in season two and was signed again for season three.

== Season One ==
The contestants in the first season were Wei-sheng, Nadia, Deborah, Cheryl, Mikey, James, Hani, Ivan, Prav and Zura Season One was aired online and then broadcast on the HyppTV network in October 2014.

== Season Two ==
The contestants in the second season were Ashley, Jason, Nik Danial, Ming, Dini, Mia, Thivian, Aveena, Cindy, and Boey.

In Season Two, the contestants were exposed to the traditional performing arts, such as the face-mask changing dance (Bian Lian), the classical Indian dance of Odissi, and the sounds of the Malay gamelan ensemble.

Season Two had a limited release on a private server and then subsequently aired on YouTube end 2015.

== Episodes ==
| Season | Episode | Title | Quests | Approx. duration |
|---|---|---|---|---|
| 1 | One | The Adventure Begins | Kambing Run, Bamboo Task, Teka-Teki-Tiki | 32 mins |
| 1 | Two | Soaked | Culture Stock, Rope Task, The Sungai | 34 mins |
| 1 | Three | The Art of Sleeping Outside | Satu Teh Tarik, Baling Selipar Task, Galah Panjang | 32 mins |
| 1 | Four | Sink or Swim | Guli Golf, Raft Task, Have Raft Will Travel | 32 mins |
| 1 | Five | Live The Adventure | Cili Champion, Shelter Task, The Sumpit | 34 mins |
| 1 | Six | The Cultured Three | | 32 mins |
| 1 | Seven | The Final Campfire | Fugee School Visit | 32 mins |
| 1 | Eight | Recapitulate | Episode Look-Back | 32 mins |
| 2 | One | The Adventure Begins Again | The Selection Ring | 20 mins |
| 2 | Two | Two Sides of the River | Local Delicacies, The Sumpit 2.0, Lumpur | 21 mins |
| 2 | Three | One Step Forward, Two Steps Back | The Bamboo Puzzle | 20 mins |
| 2 | Four | Self Sacrifice | Kampung Quest Fishing, Drag Race | 24 mins |
| 2 | Five | Gettin' Down & Dirty | Satu Teh Ais, Padang | 23 mins |
| 2 | Six | True Calling | Confession Ring, Rambutans | 20 mins |
| 2 | Seven | Torn Between Two Brothers | The Hunt, Only The Strong | 17 mins |
| 2 | Eight | The Game Is Always Evolving | | 18 mins |
| 2 | Nine | Playing The Game | Balance on Barrel, Wheelbarrow | 19 mins |
| 2 | Ten | Live Together, Outlast Everyone | Tyre’d Out, Confession Ring | 24 mins |
| 2 | Eleven | | The Pit | 16 mins |
| 2 | Twelve | | School of Orphans Visit, Face Your Reptile Fear | 16 mins |
| 2 | Thirteen | The Final Campfire | | 25 mins |
