= The Cuts Indonesia =

- Genre: Reality competition Hairstyling
- Presented by: Jeiver Justin; Fitri Tropica
- Judges: Henoch Sitompul; Alex Abbad; Wak Doyok; Claudia Adinda
- Country of origin: Indonesia
- Original language: Indonesian
- No. of seasons: 1
- No. of episodes: 9

Production
- Producer: Atiek Nur Wahyuni
- Production location: Jakarta
- Camera setup: Multi-camera
- Running time: 105-120 minutes
- Production company: Transmedia Corp

Original release
- Network: Trans7
- Release: January 15 – April 12, 2017

The Cuts Indonesia is an Indonesian reality hairstyling competition television series broadcast on Trans7 since 15 January 2017 and aired every Sunday at 8:30 PM. The judges are Henoch Sitompul, Indonesian actor Alex Abbad, Malaysian fashion icon Wak Doyok, and Claudia Adinda. The show is presented by Jevier Justin and Fitri Tropica.
