= BossBabes =

New Zealand TV series

- Genre: Reality TV
- Created by: Alysha Kennedy
- Written by: Bill Kerton
- Starring: Iyia Liu; Edna Swart
- Narrated by: Hayley Sproull; Shavaughn Ruakere
- Theme music composer: Ill Esha
- Opening theme: 'Stacking That Paper'
- Country of origin: New Zealand
- Original language: English
- No. of seasons: 3
- No. of episodes: 22

Production
- Executive producer: Emma White
- Producer: Alysha Kennedy
- Production locations: Auckland, New Zealand; Sydney, Australia; Bali, Indonesia; Pretoria, South Africa; Nadi, Fiji
- Running time: 21-32 minutes

Original release
- Network: TVNZ+
- Release: 6 August 2019 – 9 November 2022

BossBabes is a New Zealand reality television series, produced by Warner Bros. International Television New Zealand for TVNZ+. It follows two Auckland influencers and businesswomen, Iyia Liu and Edna Swart, who run their own social media e-commerce businesses. Season 1 debuted on August 6, 2019 and Season 2 began on April 7, 2020. Season 3 premiered on November 9, 2022.

During the first season, Iyia Liu owns a confectionary delivery company, Celebration Box, while helping her friend Edna launch a bodycare product line titled Ed&i Body as a "complimentary side product to Ed&i Swimwear". Liu is also featured undergoing a Brazilian butt lift procedure before her first pregnancy with her boyfriend Jordan Delmont, whom she first meets in the first episode of Season 1. Episodes for the first season were filmed in Auckland, New Zealand, Sydney, Australia and Bali, Indonesia.

In the second season, Liu gives birth to her first child named Summer. Swart becomes engaged to her fiancé Alex and embarks on her honeymoon. Episodes for the second season were filmed in Auckland and Pretoria, South Africa. The third season follows Swart through her hens day and subsequent wedding to Reid Stephen. Liu's Tidal Hair business is booming and her first daughter Summer is now two. Liu and Delmont's new home in Coatesville begins construction and Liu announces her pregnancy. Episodes for the third season were filmed in Auckland and Nadi, Fiji.

The series was produced by Warner Bros. International Television Production NZ. It was not renewed for a fourth season.

== Series overview ==
Season	Episodes	Originally released	
Season	Episodes	First released	Last released
1	8	August 6, 2019	September 17, 2019
2	6	April 7, 2020	May 12, 2020
3	8	November 9, 2022	November 9, 2022

== Cast ==
BossBabes Cast
Name	Season 1	Season 2	Season 3
Iyia Liu	Main Cast - entrepreneur, Celebration Box, Girls in Business, Tidal Hair	Main	Main
Edna Swart	Main Cast - entrepreneur, Ed&i Body	Main	Main
Rosie Crawford	Midwife, model, friend to Iyia and Edna	Guest	Guest
Jordan Delmont	Iyia's boyfriend	Guest	Guest
Harry Ferreira	Edna's business partner and former boyfriend		
Mikey B	Edna and Harry's former business partner		
Sophie Maitland	Iyia's friend and former Marketing and Social Media Manager		
Briar Howard	Iyia's friend and former business partner		
Brittany Wickes	Edna's friend and stay at home Mum		
Briahna Barrett	Iyia and Edna's intern, Ed&i shareholder		
Alex McNaughten	Edna's former fiancé		
Maiah Stewart	Edna's intern		
Reid Stephen	Edna's husband		

== Controversy ==
While media critics and influencers initially praised and promoted the series, BossBabes has become the subject of criticism on social media. Most criticism was aimed at Iyia Liu and problems surrounding her dessert delivery company, Celebration Box, which was under investigation by the Commerce Commission for possibly violating the Fair Trading Act.

Iyia Liu was also featured in an investigation into money laundering by the National Business Review and Auckland blogger Alex Janssen, citing Liu's financial ties to a defunct property scheme, called Future Living, run by her mother, Caroline Zhao, and controversial developer, Dan "Robert" McEwan. As a result of the investigation, Iyia Liu's ties to the alleged pyramid scheme were exposed, linking her to a series of corporate registrations and investments through a personal family trust, which included the purchase and a mortgage for property in the affluent rural community of Coatesville. The suspect property, a partly built mansion, was featured by 1News and other news outlets in 2018 as her second mansion, despite records showing that she only owned the Coatesville property that is under construction.

National Business Review journalist, Calida Stuart-Menteath, won New Zealand Business Journalist of 2019 at the Voyager Media Awards because her investigation into Iyia Liu "provided important and highly relevant context about her family connections."

During filming of the second season of BossBabes, Liu founded a new company Tidal Hair which drew questions over its suspiciously high follower count upon launch. As a result, Tidal Hair's Instagram page was terminated in February 2020, but was later reactivated.
