= Pioneer Quest: A Year in the Real West =

Coordinates: 50.242268°N 97.45751°W

- Starring: Alana Logie; Frank Logie; Deanna Treadway; Tim Treadway
- Country of origin: Canada
- Original language: English
- No. of seasons: 1
- No. of episodes: 9

Production
- Executive producer: Jamie Brown
- Producer: Jamie Brown
- Production locations: Argyle, Manitoba, Canada
- Running time: 50 mins

Original release
- Network: History Television; Public Broadcasting Service
- Release: November 19, 2000 – November 27, 2001

Related
- Quest for the Bay

Pioneer Quest: A Year in the Real West was a Canadian documentary television series which aired on History Television and the Public Broadcasting Service in 2001. It is the first entry of producer Jamie Brown's "Quest series" which includes Quest for the Bay (2002), Klondike: The Quest for Gold (2003) and Quest for the Sea (2004). It was filmed on a site just north of Argyle, Manitoba

== Cast ==
- Alana Logie
- Frank Logie
- Deanna Treadway
- Tim Treadway

== Episodes ==
No.	Title	Original release date	Prod. code
1	"The Dream"	19 November 2000	#1.01
Hundreds of candidates have volunteered to spend an entire year living as 1870s settlers. Viewers meet some of them, and see the intense selection process used to select the two couples. It ends with their move onto the Manitoba prairie.
2	"If Momma Ain't Happy..."	19 November 2000	#1.02
The settlers struggle against illness, fatigue and self-doubt while plowing fields and caring for livestock.
3	"Prairie Purgatory"	4 February 2001	#1.03
The settlers endure an infestation of mosquitoes; isolation and close quarters cause emotional stress.
4	"What Are We Doing This For?"	4 February 2001	#1.04
Tension builds between the couples while they undertake their biggest project - building their house.
5	"101 Chopping Days 'til Christmas"	1 April 2001	#1.05
After a crop failure, the settlers must hunt for food.
6	"No Way, We're Not Leaving"	1 April 2001	#1.06
The settlers celebrate a traditional Christmas.
7	"The Long Haul"	10 June 2001	#1.07
The settlers continue to brave the harsh winter, and get some traditional (and painful) dental treatment.
8	"Going Home"	10 June 2001	#1.08
Spring floods threaten to destroy the settlers food store. The settlers celebrate the end of the year and return to the 21st century.
9	"Survivors of the Real West"	27 November 2001	#1.09
The settlers reflect on their experiences after they return to the 21st century.
