= Around Naija =

TV show in Nigeria

- Season 1

Around Naija is a Nigerian reality show which focuses on the people of Nigeria and Nigeria's history.

== Competition ==
Around Naija engages 37 participants each from the 36 states of the country and the Federal Capital Territory.

Formerly designed as a road-show/tour around the country, It was restructured in line with the security status of the nation, and now holds in one particular city but still features the full 37 contestants. The Around Naija reality TV show seeks to engage participants in tasks that highlights the economic and socio-cultural values of the various ethnic groups in Nigeria – their food, language, dance, music, history, clothes and culture.

The reality show which is predominantly competitive and informative in nature, and is designed to be a socio-cultural experiment as certain components of the reality show helps to showcase talent, potential and behavioural characteristics of participants or contestants.

The winner of the competition and the first and second runners-up goes home with N10 million, N5 million and N2 million respectively concluded.

== Audition ==
The audition for Around Naija was conducted online across the country, in line with the ‘new normal’ of social and physical distancing as stipulated in the Corona Virus, COVID-19 pandemic protocols.

== Brand ambassador ==
Former footballer for the Super Eagles of Nigeria, AFC Ajax, Arsenal FC and Inter Milan FC, Nwankwo Kanu is the brand ambassador of Around Naija. The choice of him being the brand ambassador was based around his victories in the Premier League and the UEFA Champions League, and his influence amongst young Nigerians.
