= Married to Medicine =

American reality television series

- Also known as: Married to Medicine: Atlanta
- Genre: Reality
- Created by: Mariah Huq
- Starring: Toya Bush-Harris; Dr. Jackie Walters; Dr. Simone Whitmore; Quad Webb; Mariah Huq; Kari Wells; Dr. Heavenly Kimes; Lisa Nicole Cloud; Dr. Contessa Metcalfe; Anila Sajja; Phaedra Parks; Lateasha Lunceford; Dr. Mimi Sanders
- Country of origin: United States
- Original language: English
- No. of seasons: 12
- No. of episodes: 206 (list of episodes)

Production
- Executive producers: Mariah Huq; Matt Anderson; Nate Green
- Running time: 41–43 minutes
- Production companies: Fremantle North America; Purveyors of Pop

Original release
- Network: Bravo
- Release: March 24, 2013 – present

Related
- Married to Medicine: Houston; Married to Medicine: Los Angeles

Married to Medicine, also known as Married to Medicine: Atlanta, is an American reality television series and franchise that premiered on Bravo on March 24, 2013. The series chronicles the personal and professional lives of several women in the Atlanta medical community with four of the women being doctors themselves, while the others are doctors' wives. It shows the group as they balance their social circles, careers and families.

The current cast of the show’s twelfth season consists of Dr. Jackie Walters, Dr. Simone Whitmore, Dr. Contessa Metcalfe, Dr. Mimi Sanders, Toya Bush-Harris, and Quad Webb, with Dr. Heavenly Kimes, Angel Love Davis, and Brandi Milton serving as friends of the show.

== Production ==
In November 2012, Bravo announced the series green-light of Married to Medicine. The network detailed the series by stating, "Married to Medicine follows a group of successful and educated women, including doctors and wives of doctors, who are connected to the world of medicine in Atlanta." Purveyors of Pop, a production company formed by Real Housewives producers Matt Anderson and Nate Green, produced the series, its second on Bravo after The Real Housewives of Miami. At the time of its debut, Married to Medicine held the title of highest-rated series premiere since Bethenny Getting Married? in 2010 and the most watched non-spinoff series premiere in the network's history. The milestone was later surpassed in January 2014 by Blood, Sweat and Heels. The first season delivered over 1 million viewers in the 18-49 viewership demographic and 1.8 million total viewers, making it the network's highest-rated non-franchise/non-spin-off freshman series since Queer Eye for the Straight Guy.

The success of the show has resulted in two spin-offs, set in Houston and Los Angeles. The former premiered on November 11, 2016; whilst the latter began airing on March 10, 2019.

== Overview and casting ==
=== Seasons 1–4 ===
The first season was shot in Atlanta in September and October 2012. By February 2013, the first-season cast was revealed with Toya Bush-Harris, Mariah Huq, Quad Webb-Lunceford, Jackie Walters, Kari Wells, and Simone Whitmore starring in the series. The series premiered on March 24, 2013.

The production of the second season began the first week of September 2013. It premiered on April 6, 2014, with Bush-Harris, Huq, Webb-Lunceford, Walters, and Whitmore reprising their roles while Lisa Nicole Cloud and Heavenly Kimes joined the series beginning with the second season after the departure of Wells, who made guest appearances throughout the season.

On January 15, 2015, Bravo renewed the show for a third season, which premiered on June 7, 2015, and featured Bush-Harris, Webb-Lunceford, Walters, Whitmore, Kimes, and Cloud reprising their roles from the second season. Huq transitioned into a recurring role for the third season, while Jill Connors, who had guest-starred in the second season, was featured in a recurring capacity. Former cast member Wells made a guest appearance.

Sources revealed on April 27, 2016, that the show had been renewed for a fourth season by Bravo, and the current cast were already six weeks into filming. The entire cast from the third season returned as series regulars, along with Huq returning in a recurring capacity and Wells in a guest role, joined by friend of the show, Genise Shelton.

=== Seasons 5–7 ===
On June 19, 2017, it was confirmed that majority of the cast would be returning for the upcoming fifth season, with the exception of Cloud and Shelton, the latter of whom made a guest appearance alongside Wells. Huq returned in a recurring capacity. On September 19, 2017, Bravo announced the premiere date for the fifth season, along with a trailer and the reveal of the new cast member, Dr. Contessa Metcalfe, who officially joined the main cast from the third episode.

On April 11, 2018, Bravo renewed the show for a sixth season, which premiered on September 2, 2018. On August 2, 2018, the trailer for the sixth season was released. The cast was also revealed, reconfirming the majority of the cast of the fifth season, along with Huq rejoining the main cast. Dr. Jarrett Manning was introduced in a 'friend' capacity after appearing in the prior season as a guest, with Wells making a guest appearance. Webb-Lunceford announced during the season six reunion that she had filed for divorce from her then-husband, Dr. Greg Lunceford.

On August 6, 2019, the show was renewed for a seventh season which premiered on September 8, 2019. Manning returned as a guest with Wells, whilst Buffie Purselle was made a friend of the cast. This marked the final appearance of the show's creator, executive producer and main cast member, Huq, who departed the series after seven seasons.

=== Seasons 8–11 ===
On January 13, 2021, the show was renewed for an eighth season which premiered on March 7, 2021; introducing Anila Sajja as a main cast member. Cloud and Wells returned to the series in recurring capacities. Webb, previously Webb-Lunceford, was demoted to a recurring capacity following her divorce from her ex-husband and the heated exchanges involving her and Huq in the previous two seasons.

On May 12, 2022, the show was renewed for a ninth season which premiered on July 10, 2022, with Quad rejoining the main cast, alongside Audra Frimpong and Wells as recurring cast members. Cloud exited the series ahead of the show's ninth season. Metcalfe and Sajja were not asked to return for the series' tenth season.

Phaedra Parks was confirmed to join the series for its tenth season. The show's tenth season premiered on November 5, 2023, with Lateasha Lunceford and Parks joining the main cast, and Dr. Alicia Egolum joining in a recurring capacity. Former cast members Metcalfe and Sajja made guest appearances in the series' tenth season.

On May 9, 2024, the show was renewed for an eleventh season, with the entire cast from the tenth season minus Egolum returning as series regulars. The show's eleventh season premiered on November 24, 2024, with Metcalfe returning to the series in a recurring capacity, alongside new recurring cast member Dr. Mimi Sanders joining the cast. Former cast members Frimpong, Egolum and Sajja made guest appearances in the series' eleventh season.

On May 8, 2025, it was announced that Lateasha Lunceford would be exiting the series after two seasons.

=== Season 12–present ===
The show's twelfth season premiered on November 30, 2025, with Metcalfe rejoining in a full-time capacity, alongside new recurring cast members Angel Love Davis and Brandi Milton joining the cast. Sanders was upgraded to main cast after previously serving as a friend, while Kimes was demoted to a recurring capacity. Former cast member Sajja made a guest appearance in the series' twelfth season.

In May 2026, the series was renewed for a thirteenth season.

=== Timeline of cast members ===
Cast members	Seasons												
Cast members	1	2	3	4	5	6	7	8	9	10	11	12	13
Toya Bush-Harris	Main	Main	Main	Main	Main	Main	Main	Main	Main	Main	Main	Main	TBA
Dr. Jackie Walters	Main	Main	Main	Main	Main	Main	Main	Main	Main	Main	Main	Main	TBA
Dr. Simone Whitmore	Main	Main	Main	Main	Main	Main	Main	Main	Main	Main	Main	Main	TBA
Quad Webb	Main	Main	Main	Main	Main	Main	Main	Friend	Main	Main	Main	Main	TBA
Mariah Huq	Main	Main	Friend	Friend	Friend	Main	Main						
Kari Wells	Main	Guest	Guest	Guest	Guest	Guest	Guest	Friend	Friend				
Dr. Heavenly Kimes	Guest	Main	Main	Main	Main	Main	Main	Main	Main	Main	Main	Friend	TBA
Lisa Nicole Cloud		Main	Main	Main				Friend					
Dr. Contessa Metcalfe					Main	Main	Main	Main	Main	Guest	Friend	Main	TBA
Anila Sajja								Main	Main	Guest	Guest	Guest	
Lateasha Lunceford										Main	Main		
Phaedra Parks			Guest							Main	Main		
Dr. Mimi Sanders											Friend	Main	TBA
Friends of the show
Jill Connors		Guest	Friend										
Genise Shelton				Friend	Guest								
Dr. Jarrett Manning					Guest	Friend	Guest						
Buffie Purselle							Friend						
Audra Frimpong									Friend		Guest		
Dr. Alicia Egolum								Guest		Friend	Guest		
Angel Love Davis											Guest	Friend	TBA
Brandi Milton												Friend	TBA

== Series overview ==
Season	Episodes	Originally released		Average Viewers
Season	Episodes	First released	Last released	Average Viewers
1	13	March 24, 2013	June 4, 2013	1.57
2	17	April 6, 2014	July 24, 2014	1.43
3	18	June 7, 2015	October 11, 2015	1.02
4	16	November 6, 2016	February 24, 2017	1.07
5	18	November 5, 2017	March 23, 2018	0.87
6	18	September 2, 2018	January 13, 2019	0.90
7	18	September 8, 2019	January 5, 2020	1.04
8	19	March 7, 2021	July 18, 2021	0.75
9	18	July 10, 2022	November 6, 2022	0.68
10	17	November 5, 2023	March 17, 2024	0.68
11	18	November 24, 2024	April 6, 2025	0.54
12	16	November 30, 2025	March 29, 2026	0.52
