= Quest USA =

Quest USA, Da Tiao Zhan (美国大挑战) 2005 was America's first Chinese-language reality TV show (真人秀). 11 episodes were hosted by David Wu and premiered on May 30, 2005. The show aired on Liberty Media's International Channel Networks (now known as International Media Distribution).

The show was produced by House Films of New York. It consisted of four teams, each representing a different mandaring-speaking region (China, Taiwan, Hong Kong, and the US). representing China, The four teams went on a week-long scavenger hunt from Boston to Miami.
