= How to Get Lucky =

- Genre: reality TV
- Country of origin: United Kingdom
- Original language: English

How to Get Lucky (3x30') was a reality TV dating series shown on BBC Three in the United Kingdom. Aired in July 2005 (repeated September 2005), each episode followed one young woman looking for love.
