= The Partner (2004 TV series) =

2004 reality television series

- Genre: Reality television
- Country of origin: United States
- Original language: English
- No. of seasons: 1
- No. of episodes: 10

Production
- Executive producers: Chris Cowan; Jean-Michel Michenaud
- Production location: Hollywood, Los Angeles
- Running time: 1 hour
- Production company: Rocket Science Laboratories

Original release
- Network: Fox
- Release: November 7, 2004 (unaired)

The Partner is an unaired American reality television series planned for broadcast by the Fox Broadcasting Company (Fox). The series was set to premiere on November 7, 2004, for a ten-episode run, although it was cancelled by the network less than a month before its planned broadcast. The Partner depicted a series of mock trial competitions between two teams of attorneys for a position at a prestigious law firm. One team was composed of attorneys who graduated from Ivy League schools while the other team was composed of attorneys who graduated from less prestigious schools. The mock trials, which were based on real-life cases, were argued in front of a jury of laypersons. Following these arguments, the jury deliberated over which attorney to eliminate from the competition.

The Partner was a part of Fox's intent to capitalize on the longtime success of arbitration-based reality court programs. The series, however, faced criticism from many attorneys who believed it would promote a negative portrayal of the legal field. Shortly after Fox announced The Partner, the network decided to delay the series until early 2005; the network delayed the series in favor of broadcasting the reality television series My Big Fat Obnoxious Boss. In October 2004, the network announced that they had shelved the series due to an influx of legal-themed unscripted series on air.

== Format ==
The series depicted a competition among two teams of attorneys; one team composed of Ivy League graduates while the other team composed of graduates from less prestigious law schools. The two teams competed in a series of mock trials that were based on real-life cases. These mock trials were judged by a jury of laypersons, in which the jury would vote on which attorneys should leave the competition. The losing attorneys then went on trial in front of a celebrity judge who decided which contestants should be eliminated from the competition. Whichever contestant remained at the end of the competition was rewarded "a lucrative position in a prestigious law firm."

== Production ==
On March 30, 2004, Fox announced that it had given an eight-to-ten-episode commitment to The Partner. The series was conceived by Mike Darnell, the president of alternative entertainment at Fox, who was inspired by the success of other legal programs, such as L.A. Law, Law & Order, and Judge Judy. Danrell emphasized the "natural drama" of the legal field and described the series' concept as "almost like the perfect idea for bringing something from the fictional world to reality." The series, which went under a working title of The Legal Show, was produced by Rocket Science Laboratories, with Chris Cowan and Jean-Michel Michenaud serving as executive producers.

Casting calls for The Partner took place from May to August 2004, in major cities, including New York City, Washington, D.C., Atlanta, Chicago, and Los Angeles. Supervising casting director Tyler Ramsey posted a Craigslist advertisement, in which he sought "Charismatic young lawyers [to] compete in mock trials/courtroom showdowns on prime-time TV." In order to scope out contestants from Ivy League schools, the casting crew visited popular bars in cities that were frequented by law school students and graduates, such as those from Georgetown University Law Center. Over 100 attorneys tried out for the series, with the casting crew claiming that many auditioned in order to gain "exposure". Applicants were required to have passed the bar examination since April 2003, and not yet secured a full-time job at a law firm.

== Cancellation ==
The Partner was scheduled to premiere on November 7, 2004, although Fox opted to instead air the reality television series My Big Fat Obnoxious Boss. As a result, the series was delayed until early 2005. In October 2004, however, Fox and Rocket Science Laboratories released a joint statement in which they confirmed the cancellation of the series. The network and production company attributed the series' cancellation to the influx of legal-themed unscripted series at the time. They stated: "With the numerous boardroom-type unscripted programs on the various network’s schedules, we have decided to focus our mutual efforts on other unscripted material." The Partner was the second project between Fox and Rocket Science Laboratories to be shelved, following the cancellation of Seriously, Dude, I'm Gay in May 2004.

== See also ==
- List of television series canceled before airing an episode
