= List of television series canceled before airing an episode =

This is a list of television series canceled before airing an episode. While many television shows are produced as pilots that never air on television or in any medium, this article lists shows whose broadcasts were officially announced but then canceled prior to the debut on the original network. Shows are listed in alphabetical order, and include the slated year of debut, known cast and plot information, the reason for cancellation (if known), and what happened to the series after cancellation.

== # ==
13 Bourbon Street (1997)
Created by Michael Malone and Josh Griffith, and executive producer of One Life to Live, Linda Gottlieb, this soap opera was supposed to air late nights on the Fox Broadcasting Company, but it never materialized after Peter Roth joined Fox Broadcasting Company.

== A ==
The Activist (2021)
Created by Global Citizen and Live Nation, this reality competition show, hosted by Usher, Priyanka Chopra, and Julianne Hough, was to focus on six activists working to bring change to one of three causes (health, education, and the environment), with the finalists attending the 2021 G20 summit. The activist who raised the most funds would be crowned "The Activist". The methodology of how the contestants' success would have been judged (via social media engagement and assessments by the hosts) drew immense backlash. Originally slated for an October premiere date on CBS for the 2021–22 season, the show was reportedly reformatted to a documentary special following the controversy.

All My Babies' Mamas (2013)
An American reality show set to air on Oxygen starring rapper Shawty Lo (who died in 2016), showcasing his life as the father of eleven children by ten different women. The series was canceled after an online petition and public outcry.

All-Star Celebrity Bowling (2014)
Revival of the 1970s bowling game show Celebrity Bowling that was to air on AMC. The channel had picked up the show in May 2014 before deciding in October to cancel all but one of its unscripted programs. All-Star Celebrity Bowling was one of at least three shows canceled in this manner.

Amazon High (1997)
Selma Blair starred as a present-day high school student who accidentally travels back in time to the mythical days of the Amazons. Amazon High, co-starring Karl Urban, was proposed as a third show set in the Hercules and Xena mythological genre, but was never aired. Later, portions of the pilot were adapted and edited into the Xena: Warrior Princess episode "Lifeblood" in 2000.

Angels '88/'89 (1988 and 1989)
Attempted revival of Charlie's Angels that was proposed for the then-new Fox network produced by Aaron Spelling in the wake of the 1988 Writers Guild of America strike. This would allow for the re-use of scripts from the original series without the need for writers. Four women (including Téa Leoni) were cast in the starring roles. It was renamed Angels '89 due to production delays taking it into the following calendar year. It was eventually abandoned the next year after the settlement of the writer's strike.

Aquaman (2006)
A live-action failed pilot for The CW that never aired on the network. It was later released digitally on iTunes on July 25, 2006. Within a week, it reached the number-one spot on the list of most downloaded TV shows on the digital store's list and held that spot for over a week.

El ático (2022)
Spanish talk show meant to be hosted by Ion Aramendi on Telecinco on the weekday 8 p.m. timeslot. Four pilots were taped before Telecinco's parent company Mediaset España decided against moving ahead with the format.
Archie (1976)
A live-action television pilot that was pitched to ABC. Based on Archie Comics characters, it would have starred Dennis Bowen as Archie Andrews, alongside Audrey Landers as Betty Cooper and Hilary Thompson as Veronica Lodge.

== B ==
Bastards (2019)
A dark drama series based on the Israeli series Nevelot starring Richard Gere that was given a straight-to-series order in late 2018 by Apple TV. It was said to focus on two Vietnam veterans and best friends, and would have been Gere's highest-profile television role. Howard Gordon and Warren Leight collaborated on two scripts for Bastards, but Apple was concerned about the "show's tone of vigilante justice" and scrapped the show. A previous attempt at an American adaptation of Nevelot had been in development at HBO in 2015 before it was eventually scrapped.

The Big D (2022)
An American reality dating competition show that was scheduled to air on TBS, hosted by JoJo Fletcher and Jordan Rodgers. It was set to focus on divorced couples living together and looking for love with other contestants, with one single participant eliminated each episode. On June 16, 2022, the series was canceled after Discovery took over Warner Bros. from AT&T and removed several aired and unaired series from their platforms for tax purposes. The series was eventually picked up by the USA Network and aired in 2023.

Bill and Martha (1964)
An American situational comedy starring William Bendix and Martha Raye that was scheduled to air on CBS, but was not aired due to the purported shaky health of Bendix. This action resulted in a lawsuit from Bendix for $2.658 million in May with the actor stating that the decision hurt his career, he was in excellent health, and he could perform all of the requirements of the agreement. The case was settled out of court for an undisclosed amount. Bendix subsequently died on 14 December 1964 from complications of stomach cancer and pneumonia.

Bimbos et Intellos (2007)
A French adaptation of the American reality television series Beauty and the Geek that was to air on TF1. The show was hosted by Laurent Ournac, produced by Endemol, and was filmed in Hammamet, Tunisia. Six episodes of the show were filmed in March and April 2007. While the show was first scheduled to air in summer of 2007, the show faced constant delays before it was ultimately scrapped by TF1 with no episodes aired.

Blonde Charity Mafia (2009 and 2010)
An American reality series developed by Lifetime, it followed three Washington, D.C. socialites whose lives revolved around charity events. After production was completed on one six-episode season, Lifetime decided to sell the show to the CW network rather than air the show themselves. The CW scheduled the July premiere date for the series, but later decided to forgo all original programming for that summer and programed the show as a midseason replacement for the 2009–10 season. Sometime after that decision, the network apparently lost interest in the series; references to it were removed from CW websites, and on December 29 the network officially confirmed that it would not air the show at all. It was apparently dropped in favor of two other reality series developed by The CW, Fly Girls and High Society. The series did air on MTV Australia and MTV New Zealand in August and September 2009.

Bridge & Tunnel (2010)
An MTV slice of life documentary-style reality show that follows the lives of young residents on Staten Island. The show was in production and had a scheduled air date for October 2010, but was ultimately pulled for being too similar to the network's hit Jersey Shore. The concept of a Staten Island-based reality program was revisited by MTV at the start of 2019 with Made in Staten Island. However, that project would air only three episodes on the network in January 2019 before being pulled due to low ratings and general criticism of a focus on younger people with possible organized crime/mob ties, which MTV exploited with a Sopranos-inspired launch campaign. Some of that cast would be involved in another series, Families of the Mafia, meant to take a less confrontational view of mob families in general; that series would air all six of its episodes in the spring of 2020.

== C ==
Captain America (1998)
The animated series, based on the comic book character of the same name, was meant to premiere in February on Fox Kids. However, the show was pulled due to Marvel's bankruptcy and conflicts about whether it was appropriate to use Nazi imagery when portraying the villains.

The Cheetah Girls (2003)
Based on the novel series of the same name, ABC canceled this television series before producing any episodes. However, three TV movies were made: The Cheetah Girls (film), The Cheetah Girls 2, and The Cheetah Girls: One World.

Coach (2015)
A revival of the 1990s sitcom of the same name, Coach was picked up by NBC without a pilot. Shortly after the series began production, unspecified problems with NBC staff prompted the network to cancel the series before any of its 13-episode order made it to air.

Coastocoast (1978)
This hour-long sitcom about two airline stewardesses from Bud Yorkin's production company was originally announced for NBC's Thursday night schedule. Yorkin stated he preferred a delayed debut. When Fred Silverman took over the network in June, the show was pulled for "further development" and eventually scrapped.

Codes of Conduct (2015)
HBO was producing Codes of Conduct, the Steve McQueen-Matthew Michael Carnahan written drama series about an African American man from Queens attempt in join Manhattan high society, with Devon Terrell, Paul Dano, Helena Bonham Carter, and Rebecca Hall as the leads of the limited series. The limited series was canceled due to its expensive production.

Commando Nanny (2004)
A sitcom series for The WB, created by Survivor producer Mark Burnett, was based on his life as an au pair (he is also a former squaddie, serving in No3 Para). Scheduled for the WB's Friday comedy block, the show's September 17 debut was delayed due to Phillip Winchester breaking his foot and being replaced by Owain Yeoman, followed by Gerald McRaney undergoing lung surgery. After the pilot was reshot, Rachel Sweet departed as showrunner, forcing The WB to shelve the sitcom permanently.

Confederate (2020)
Confederate was a planned American alternate history drama television series developed for the network HBO by David Benioff and D. B. Weiss, who had previously developed the HBO series Game of Thrones. The series was to be set in a timeline where the American Civil War ended in a stalemate. The announcement was followed by anger and criticism on social media with some describing it as slavery fan fiction, leading to the hashtag #NoConfederate, which trended number one in the United States and number two worldwide on Twitter in mid 2017. In April 2018, Variety reported that the future of Confederate was uncertain. In July 2018, HBO president Casey Bloys confirmed the series was still in development, and hoped it would resume once Benioff and Weiss finished their ongoing commitments. In February 2019, Bloys said the series was still in development and not affected by the controversy, but stated in May 2019 that it was "not on the front burner". In August 2019, it was announced that Benioff and Weiss had closed a multi-million dollar deal with Netflix and it was reported that the deal "wipes Confederate off HBO's books." In January 2020, Bloys confirmed that the project had been officially canceled without an episode being made.

The Cops (2017 and 2018)
An adult animated series created by Louis C.K. and Albert Brooks for TBS for its at the time up-and-coming animation block. Other than a few clips shown at the San Diego Comic-Con promotion for TBS Animation, nothing else was known about the series. In the wake of the Weinstein effect, sexual misconduct claims emerged against C.K. in November 2017 and were confirmed by him shortly thereafter; subsequently, the series was canceled, leaving Tarantula, Close Enough, Final Space, and a new season of American Dad! the remaining shows off its block (Close Enough was delayed and later moved to HBO Max, with Tarantula ending after one season).

Cortes (2020)
An historical drama miniseries for Amazon Prime Video created and written by Steven Zaillian and starring Javier Bardem. In September 2020, Amazon decided to withdraw from its partnership with Amblin Television on the miniseries, effectively scrapping the project due to complications from the COVID-19 pandemic.

Country Style (1964)
A country-themed show made for ATN-7 in Sydney, Australia. In 14 episodes and shot on 16mm film, it had various country music stars appearing as guests, including Rex Dallas and Smoky Dawson. American Marty Robbins, who rarely appeared on television, performed "Devil Woman" and "El Paso". According to associate producers the LeGarde Twins, the show was pulled when host Digby Wolfe began making demands for high pay and luxuries. The series finally aired 48 years later, debuting on January 2, 2011, on CMC in Australia. The first episode was filmed in color, which was so expensive that only that episode was in color; as of 2012, that first episode remains lost.

== D ==
Day One (2010)
American sci-fi drama from NBC about apartment residents who survive an unknown worldwide cataclysm that destroys all modern infrastructure. The show was initially ordered to series, then had its order cut to mini-series, then it was announced the pilot would be retooled as a television movie, before ending up never airing at all. According to NBC's Angela Bromstad, the show was originally expected to fill the Heroes time slot after the 2010 Winter Olympics. The movie/pilot was directed by Alex Graves, who previously directed the pilot episode for the Fox TV series Fringe and for the NBC TV series Journeyman.

Despedida de Casado (1977)
Brazilian telenovela produced by TV Globo and written by Walter George Durst, starring Regina Duarte and Antônio Fagundes. The telenovela had 30 episodes recorded and was scheduled to premiere on January 3, 1977, however, it was cancelled after being banned by the censorship board of the Brazilian government (at the time, a military dictatorship), claiming that the telenovela preached the dissolution of marriage and was contrary to morality and good habits. The telenovela's plot was about crisis in marriage and divorce, which became legal in Brazil in December 1977.

The Dictator (1988)
Christopher Lloyd starred as Paul Joseph Domino, the deposed president-for-life of a small South Seas nation, now running a laundromat with his family in New York's Rego Park area. The pilot episode was well-reviewed, and the series was scheduled to premiere on March 15, 1988. However, despite receiving significant on-air promotion from CBS, The Dictator did not make it to air due to the 1988 Writers Guild of America strike.

Do You Trust Me? (2007)
American game show for CBS hosted by Tucker Carlson. Six episodes were produced in 2007, but none aired. The series had a page on the CBS website.

Domestic Goddess (2003)
American cooking series for ABC Family hosted by Roseanne Barr. Thirteen episodes were ordered but Barr underwent an emergency hysterectomy on August 20 which ended the project before it began. A program detailing the show's creation, The Real Roseanne Show, made it to air on ABC that summer.

The Don Hornsby Show (also billed as The Anchor Hocking Show) (1950)
Don "Creesh" Hornsby, a rising 26-year-old comic, was slated to host American television's first-ever late night variety show for NBC. Hornsby suddenly died from a rapid onset of polio the day he was to host his first episode. On May 22, 1950, after a one-week delay, NBC went ahead with the basic format, launching Broadway Open House with Jerry Lester in what would have been Hornsby's time slot. That series would form the most basic structure of the late night television format, and eventually be re-formed as NBC's enduring franchise, The Tonight Show.

Don't Stop Believing (2011)
Australian talent show for Network Ten inspired by the musical comedy-drama Glee. The show was commissioned in 2010 prior to the broadcast of the British version of the format, but was initially delayed and then cancelled after the original version failed to attract viewers in the UK.

Dreamfinders (1983)
Loosely based on the Epcot ride Journey into Imagination, this show that was slated to premier shortly after the launch of The Disney Channel was to focus on the adventures of Dreamfinder and Figment. Despite being promoted along with the launch of the network, it was canceled shortly after launch with at least one episode partially filmed.

Dropped (2015)
A French adaptation of the Swedish reality show Det största äventyret (The Great Adventure) that involved placing several sports personalities at a remote location, where they must use their survival skills to find their way back to civilization. The program was scheduled to air on TF1 in summer 2015, but production was cancelled in March of that same year following a helicopter crash that claimed the lives of three of the program's contestants and five members of its production crew, with Franck Firmin-Guion (CEO of Adventure Line Productions, who produced the series) later confirming that footage of the show would "not see the light of day" following the incident.

== E ==
Eight Days a Week (2008)
The CW announced this single-camera comedy for mid-season, but no episodes were produced besides the unaired pilot, partly due to the 2007–08 Writers Guild of America strike.

Escaping the KKK (originally titled Generation KKK) (2017)
An A&E docuseries profiling the Ku Klux Klan and members seeking to break away from it. A&E canceled the series on December 24, 2016 (three weeks before its scheduled premiere), amid revelations that the show's producers made monetary payments to some participants for access (there were also concerns from critics at the time that the show would glorify the all-white organization and its reactionary beliefs).

Ev and Ocho (2012)
A VH1 reality show featuring NFL wide receiver Chad Johnson ("Ocho Cinco") and his then-wife, Basketball Wives star Evelyn Lozada, had eleven episodes taped. Johnson's arrest for assaulting Lozada, which came three weeks before the show was to premiere, and the subsequent divorce, prompted VH1 to shelve the series.

Everything Money Can't Buy (1974)
ABC originally announced this series for its fall schedule, although no pilot had been made, just a sizzle reel. The show was retooled into the 1976 show Good Heavens.

== F ==
Famous (2016)
This comedy was filmed in mockumentary style at a couples therapy session, and features dating high school teachers Fred and Geneva, both of whom secretly aspire to work in Hollywood. He wants to be a screenwriter and she envisions stardom as a pop diva. The series was picked up by Fox Broadcasting Company in April 2016 and was set to air on June 12, 2016. The series was given a straight to series order with 10 episodes, but a cast had not been chosen in time. The show was later pulled from the schedule with regular summer reruns airing instead.

Fearless (2003 and 2004)
The WB announced production of this show for the 2003–04 season that was based on the young adult series of novels by Francine Pascal for its Tuesday-night schedule. The show starred Rachael Leigh Cook, Bianca Lawson, Ian Somerhalder, and Eric Balfour. The network decided to put One Tree Hill in its place (a show that complemented its lead-in, Gilmore Girls) as lead actor Chad Michael Murray appeared in its first two seasons) and move Fearless to midseason after hearing of issues producers were having with the lead character's emotions and later issues of casting. After many delays, the show was canceled. The pilot was the only episode shot, and although it never aired on television, it later leaked on the Internet.

Flip It Forward (2014)
This HGTV series was to feature David Benham and his twin brother, Jason Benham (The Benham Brothers). The already-greenlit series was abruptly canceled in the wake of protests after reports surfaced of the duo's ties to religious groups (the Benhams publicly oppose homosexuality and are also prominent pro-life and Christian activists).

Force III (1987)
Orbis Communications and movie producers Edward S. Feldman and Charles R. Meeker were to unveil a syndicated half-hour action drama, Force III, in 1987, with a 65-episode order, from writer Edward J. Lasko. It was meant to be sold to local stations, but was reportedly canceled before any of the 65 episodes could be aired.

Friend Me (2013)
A late addition to CBS's 2012–13 schedule, this multi-camera sitcom was scheduled to premiere mid-season. The show never aired due to the suicide of co-creator Alan Kirschenbaum in October 2012. The show's official page disappeared from the CBS website sometime in February 2013, and it was reportedly announced as axed at the August Television Critics Association Press Tour.

The Frame (2011)
US network The CW announced this 8-week 16-episode Big Brother-esque reality game show for mid-season in 2011, but it was revealed to be shelved in March 2012.

== G ==
Garbage Pail Kids (1987)
An animated series based on Topps's popular parody of the Cabbage Patch Kids was scheduled to debut on CBS's Saturday-morning schedule, but was canceled before its debut after complaints from parental groups and (like Little Muppet Monsters) replaced by an extra half-hour of Muppet Babies. Although the 13 produced episodes aired in other countries (most notably Iceland), it remained unseen on television in North America. It was not until April 2006 that the complete series was released on DVD by Paramount Home Entertainment.

Good Grief (2014)
Lifetime had announced plans to debut the reality television series, which would have followed the owners of the Johnson Family Mortuary funeral home in Fort Worth, Texas, and began airing promotions for the series. Lifetime decided to cancel the series altogether on July 24, 2014, after several scheduling and filming issues. The program's scrapping ultimately came from the July 15 discovery of eight unattended and/or decomposing bodies at the funeral home, which led to the arrests of owner Dondre Johnson and his wife Rachel Hardy-Johnson. (The funeral home's landlord, who was executing an eviction process, discovered the bodies and alerted authorities; both Dondre and Rachel eventually were sentenced to prison terms.) The funeral home itself had been the subject of an investigation by The Texas Funeral Services Commission and had been scrutinized by critics and the local media regarding their practices and boasting about promoting the series prior to their arrest.

The Grubbs (2002)
An American version of Granada Television's The Grimleys, starring Randy Quaid, Carol Kane, and Michael Cera, which was produced without Granada's input and blasted in early reviews as "the worst sitcom ever produced". Scheduled for Sunday nights at 9:30 PM, the show was scrapped two days before its debut. Fox Entertainment President Gail Berman stated that it "failed to live up to its creative potential".

Guasap! (2012)
Comedy/talk-show set to air on Cuatro. It was canned after Cuatro's parent group Mediaset España rejected four pilots and all parties involved in the show decided the program's timing was not right.

== H ==
Hancock Down Under (1968)
British comedian Tony Hancock was set to star in the Australian-produced TV series, playing himself as a new immigrant to Australia. After shooting the first three episodes, Hancock, whose career had faltered because of his alcoholism, committed suicide. The series was canceled without airing, although the three episodes were eventually edited together and broadcast in Australia as The Tony Hancock Special in 1972.

Head of the Class (1960)
This summer prime time game show hosted by Gene Rayburn was slated to air on NBC's Friday-night schedule from 8:30 to 9:00 p.m., and TV Guide listed this as such; however, NBC changed its plans and opted to fill the time period with reruns of Wichita Town. The pilot is among the holdings of the UCLA Film & Television Archive. This unaired show is not to be confused with the sitcom of the same name which ran on ABC from 1986 to 1991.

Heads Up! (2016)
Game show based on the popular app, produced by Ellen DeGeneres and hosted by Loni Love. 65 episodes were completed for HLN but the network shelved the show after refocusing its programming on news. The show eventually aired in Canada on the Family Channel and its sister channel, Family Chrgd.

Heathers (2018)
The TV show based on the 1988 movie of the same name was set to air on the Paramount Network on March 7, 2018, but was delayed due to the Stoneman Douglas High School shooting. Paramount would later announce the show would premiere on July 10, 2018, but then canceled the project a few weeks later. On October 4, 2018, Variety reported that a truncated version of the series would air over five nights beginning on October 25, 2018, a run itself truncated and edited due to the Tree of Life synagogue shooting.

Heavens to Betsy (1995)
Dolly Parton starred in this American half-hour comedy for CBS. Six episodes were made but none aired. The concept was later reused in the 1996 CBS TV movie Unlikely Angel.

Hieroglyph (2015)
Fox gave this historical action drama set in ancient Egypt a 13-episode straight-to-series order in October 2013 and released a trailer in May 2014. The network subsequently canceled the series in July 2014, after a single episode had been shot and several scripts had been written.

Hollyweird (1998)
A show about "the adventures of an intrepid pair of friends from Ohio who take their love for the macabre and use it to solve crimes plaguing Los Angeles", the show was to star Melissa George, Bodhi Elfman, and Fab Filippo. The pilot was ordered to series; however, Fox's tinkering and delays frustrated creator Shaun Cassidy, who pulled out of the project, saying that Fox had forced him to spend "much of the last year trying to fix something I never viewed as broken in the first place." Ultimately, production never went ahead on the show.

Hooligan's Island (2013)
A projected British sitcom television series created by, written by and starring Ade Edmondson and Rik Mayall. The show was to be a spin-off sequel to Mayall and Edmondson's BBC Two sitcom, Bottom, which ran from 1991 to 1995, and was based on the sitcom's 1997 stage tour, Bottom Live 3: Hooligan's Island, with the show's characters Richie and Eddie stranded on a desert island. It was due to air on BBC Two in 2013. On October 15, 2012, Edmondson announced during an interview with BBC Radio Essex that he had pulled out of the new series of Hooligan's Island stating that he wished to pursue other interests.

Hotel Story (1977)
This Australian series made by Crawford Productions was cancelled by Network Ten before a single episode aired and only seven episodes filmed. After Network Ten cancelled the series, Crawford Productions found their series' contract had never been signed, so they had no legal redress. The first four episodes later went to air as a "miniseries" screened over two nights (July 13 – December 27, 1977).

== I ==
Immigrants (2004)
This animated series from Klasky Csupo for Spike TV featured a story about the immigrants Jóska and Vladislav (from Hungary and Russia, respectively) as they adjust to their new life in the United States. Six episodes were ordered, with a two-hour marathon to begin the run, though no other episodes ran due to overall complications with the re-launch of the network and ratings below expectations for the animated line-up's first evening. The series was adapted into a motion picture for theatrical release, which was released on DVD in the United States in 2009.

In The Dark (1997)
The WB was slated to air an American version of the British game show of the same name on its prime-time Sunday schedule, but it was removed before its premiere. It is unrelated to the 2019 dramedy of the same name which airs on The CW.

The IT Crowd US adaptation (2008)
NBC slated an American adaptation of the British comedy series of the same name with an American cast (although Richard Ayoade reprised his role as Moss). Jessica St. Clair played the female lead Jen, and Joel McHale played Roy. The show taped its pilot before a live audience on February 16, 2007, and was picked up for a midseason debut in 2008, but was later pushed back to air during the 2008–09 season. On September 13, 2007, The Hollywood Reporter reported that NBC was considering pulling the plug on the show. When NBC announced its schedule for the 2008–09 season, The IT Crowd was not on it, and McHale had since been cast as the lead for Community. The pilot has been seen on various video-sharing sites, including YouTube.

== J ==
The Jake Effect (2002)
Seven episodes of this sitcom starring Jason Bateman were produced to premiere in midseason 2002, but NBC canceled the series before a single episode aired. In 2006, Bravo aired the first six episodes of the series as part of its "Brilliant But Canceled" block.

Jingles (2008)
A CBS series produced by Mark Burnett in which teams compete to create new advertising jingles for brand-name products. It starred Gene Simmons and Kimberly Caldwell.

== K ==
Kamelot (2003)
UPN was set to produce Kamelot, a sci-fi drama retelling of the King Arthur legend with Ron Milbauer and Terri Hughes writing and producing with Wes Craven attached as an executive producer. It was canceled, likely due to the merger of UPN and The WB.

Katbot (2005)
Katbot, produced by Disney Television Animation and based on a webtoon of the same name created by Angela Martini, was scheduled to premiere on Disney Channel in September 2005, but was ultimately canceled. Martini herself announced the cancellation of the show in a blog post, in which she also expressed distaste with Disney's version of the series, which she described as "some horrid caricature of what it originally was".

Kill the Orange-Faced Bear (2022)
TBS was producing Chris Romano's pilot Kill the Orange-Faced Bear, a live-action/animated hybrid comedy series about a man's hunt for the bear that ate his girlfriend, with Damon Wayans Jr., Jessy Hodges, Alex Karpovsky, and Nate Torrence starring in the series, and Jake Szymanski attached to direct the pilot episode through Sony Pictures Television for TBS to air. The show, which revealed that Sarah Silverman, Nicole Byer, and Sam Richardson were lined up as voice actors, was canceled due to Brett Weitz's exit from TBS as a result of Discovery, Inc. and Warner Bros.'s merger.

== L ==
Law & Order: For the Defense (2021)
In May 2021, NBC had given a straight-to-series order to Law & Order: For the Defense, a new legal drama from Law & Order franchise creator Dick Wolf, would premiere during the 2021–22 television season. In July 2021, multiple trade publications reported that NBC and Wolf had mutually agreed to scrap the series, which had not yet cast any roles, and that they would instead revive the original Law & Order (which had ended production in 2010) for the time slot.

Let's Dance (2009)
ABC ordered five episodes of an intended comedy-celebrity dance competition, to be hosted by Kathy Griffin; however, casting difficulties led to the series being scrapped.

Liza and David (2002)
This planned reality series, about the lives of Liza Minnelli and her then-husband, producer David Gest, was abruptly canceled by VH1 in October just before its debut.

Lizzie McGuire reboot for Disney+ (2020)
Originally announced to much fanfare along with Disney+ at the D23 expo in 2019, this reboot of the early 2000s Disney Channel series shot two episodes, and had a brief clip appear during a Disney+ sizzle reel on New Year's Day 2020. However, just days later, it was announced that production was paused due to the exit of the original creator Terri Minsky over creative differences, and ultimately by year's end, Hilary Duff (Lizzie) would reveal on her Instagram page that the show had been shelved. In January 2024, one of the show's writers revealed some of the storylines from the show, and also speculated that Disney had issues with the suggestion that Lizzie had sex with her childhood crush Ethan.

The Love Nest (1974)
CBS originally announced this sitcom to air in its fall schedule on Friday nights. It starred Charles Lane and Florida Friebus as widowed senior citizens who live together in a Florida trailer park.

Lost in the USA (fall 2001)
An American reality show scheduled for Sunday at 7 on The WB, it was to follow four groups of young people on a cross-country scavenger hunt. It was canceled due to troubles at the production company Artists Television Group.

Loveland (2009)
British dating game show that was to be aired on Sky One but was cancelled due to production costs.

== M ==
The Machine (2017)
Syfy was producing a pilot for the television continuation of Caradog W. James' science-fiction film The Machine. Annet Mahendru, Bridger Zadina, Olly Rix, Malachi Kirby, Indira Varma, Katee Sackhoff, Lance Henriksen, and Jaeden Bettencourt were cast for the pilot episode before Syfy passed on giving the pilot a series order.

Made by Maddie (2020)
A Nickelodeon animated series developed by Silvergate Media for preschoolers (originally titled Fashion Ally) about 8-year-old Maddie (voiced by Alyssa Cheatham) "as she uses her imagination and design ingenuity to turn every problem into a positive with the perfect fashion fix" around New York City. Despite a promo advertising the show, it was pulled from the schedule on September 4, 2020, following scrutiny over similarities between the program and the Matthew A. Cherry Oscar-winning animated short, Hair Love. In March 2021, Brian Robbins, President of ViacomCBS Kids & Family, was reported by Deadline Hollywood as saying "We'll probably have an announcement soon about the strategy for Made By Maddie but I'm not ready to tell you yet." On August 17, 2021, the trademark for the series was changed to abandoned.

Made in Kentucky (2018)
MTV reality show following young people and their lives in Kentucky.

Madison High (2011)
Disney Channel live-action spinoff of its High School Musical series of television films. The show would have featured an all-new student cast, while Alyson Reed would reprise her role as Ms. Darbus. Instead of the sitcom format used for contemporary live-action Disney television series, Madison High was to have a musical comedy format similar to the High School Musical films, featuring new original songs. Its premise was Ms. Darbus launching a "revolutionary" theater program at a different school. Production of the pilot began in March 2011, but it never aired and no further episodes were ordered. The reasons for the show's cancellation have not been made public.

Mail Order Family (2017)
An ordered NBC sitcom about a widowed American single father who marries a mail-order bride from the Philippines. Executive producer and co-creator Jackie Clarke based the series on her own experiences growing up with her Filipina stepmother (which was previously a web animated series, which was covered in a segment of the radio show This American Life), and intended to portray the character as a strong woman who helped her overcome the death of her birth mother. Less than three days after announcing the project, NBC decided not to move forward with a pilot after protests from the Asian-American community, advocates for trafficked women and mail-order brides, and a Change.org petition protesting the project that garnered nearly 10,000 signatures. NBC released a statement stating, "We purchased the pitch understanding that it would tell the creator's real-life experience of being raised by a strong Filipina stepmother after the loss of her own mother...The writer and producer have taken the sensitivity to the initial concept to heart and we have chosen not to move forward with the project at this time." Dr. E. J. R. David and Dr. Alicia del Prado, co-chairs of the Asian American Psychological Association's Division on Filipino Americans, wrote a column in Psychology Today about what lessons could be learned from the handling of the show, mentioning how future efforts should collaborate from people from the related community and not "trivialize, make light of, or laugh at serious real-life issues" such as human trafficking or buying human beings.

Mainly For Men (1969)
A BBC magazine program aimed at men. The pilot was made in 1969, but went unaired until 1992 on the TV Hell program as an example of some of the worst television ever made.

Manchester Prep (1999)
Thirteen episodes of this 1999 American Fox drama series based on Cruel Intentions were ordered, but conflicts started between Columbia TriStar Television and Fox due to network executives' uncertainty about the long-term viability of the project, and their discomfort with its themes of teen sexuality and incest. Rupert Murdoch, head of Fox parent News Corporation, was reportedly outraged after seeing a preview of a scene in which a young female character is sexually aroused by a horse. The series was canceled during filming of the third episode and was moved to the studio's home entertainment division, where the two completed episodes were edited together into the R-rated direct-to-video film Cruel Intentions 2 (2000), with additional scenes being filmed to close the story and add sexual content and nudity. The series was to be a reimagining of the 1999 film, but the film version was changed to a prequel, resulting in Sarah Thompson's character being changed to a new character and all of Sean Patrick Thomas's scenes being cut for continuity reasons. The film is now known primarily as the first major vehicle for actress Amy Adams.

Man vs. Beast (2003)
British channel ITV commissioned a six-part series based on the controversial Fox special of the same name. It was withdrawn on October 30 after protests from animal rights groups.

O Marajá (1993)
This Brazilian miniseries produced by Rede Manchete in 1993 satirized the former president of Brazil Fernando Collor. It was canceled before its debut on July 26, 1993, due to a lawsuit filed by Collor alleging irreparable damage to his reputation. A court decision in favor of Collor a few months later banned the debut, but the ban was subsequently lifted by the court on appeal. Despite this, Rede Manchete owner Adolpho Bloch decided in February 1994 not to show the miniseries, saying he wanted to avoid further conflict with Collor.

Marie (2009)
This American daily talk show from Las Vegas, hosted by Marie Osmond and syndicated by Program Partners, was cleared in 80% of U.S. markets; however, the show's distributor withdrew it from distribution on July 31, roughly six weeks before the show's debut. Some of the stations that picked up the program had also changed their mind and withdrew their commitments. Marie eventually made it to air three years later on Hallmark Channel.

Match Game (2004 and 2008)
American network Fox promoted a revival of the 1970s game show Match Game called What the Blank!, hosted by Fred Willard and announced by Randy West, for Summer 2004; other than the addition of a "man on the street" segment, the game was faithful to the 1970s format. In 2008, TBS picked up the show as Match Game for its late-night schedule with Andrew Daly as host, but did not air any episodes nor mention the show in any press since then. Other networks rumored to have declined revivals include NBC and GSN. The series eventually returned in 2012 on The Comedy Network in Canada, hosted by Darrin Rose; a primetime U.S. revival eventually was picked up in 2016 with Alec Baldwin as host for ABC.

The Mayor (2004)
American sitcom for The WB produced by Adam Sandler. Six episodes were ordered but it was later scrapped due to the network being reportedly unhappy with the show's creative direction.

Members Only (2015)
American prime time soap opera following the upstairs-downstairs drama of the powerful and wealthy Holmes family, owners of Connecticut's most exclusive clubs. It was to star Natalie Zea and John Stamos. The series was given a straight-to-series 13 episode commitment by ABC and was created by Academy Award nominees Susannah Grant and David O. Russell. However, Russell exited the series just a month after it received a straight-to-series order. Only the pilot was filmed before ABC shut down production of the series, and the pilot never aired.

The Men's Room (2005)
An NBC sitcom starring John Cho that was scheduled for midseason in the 2004–05 season, but shut down production after completing only six of its 13-episode order, none of which aired.

The Miraculous Year (2010)
On February 14, 2010, Kathryn Bigelow was set to produce John Logan's Broadway composer series The Miraculous Year for HBO, as well as direct the pilot episode, in June later that same year, Norbert Leo Butz, Hope Davis, Frank Langella and Patti LuPone were in talks to star in the series, as well as Eddie Redmayne, and in July, Susan Sarandon, Linus Roache, Stark Sands, Elaine Cassidy, Remy Nozik, Logan Georges, Lee Pace, Louis Ozawa Changchien, Giancarlo Esposito, Karine Plantadit, Andre Ward, Erik Altemus, Brooks Ashmanskas, and Daniel Davis were also cast. On November 9, 2010, it was announced HBO would not be moving forward with the series.

Misconceptions (2006)
Ordered as a midseason replacement for The WB's 2005–06 season, this sitcom would have told the story of single mother Amanda Watson (Jane Leeves) and her teenage daughter Hopper (Taylor Momsen) meeting the girl's biological father, Eddie Caprio (Adam Rothenberg), a sperm donor who turns out to have fabricated all the personal details that led Amanda to choose him, but who charms Hopper despite Amanda's distaste. Six episodes were produced, but none of them aired before The WB shut down and merged with UPN to form The CW. The newly merged network aired only two new series during its first season on the air, the rest of its schedule being made up of established series from both networks, leaving no room for Misconceptions.

Mission Control (2015)
This NBC sitcom starring Krysten Ritter and Michael Rosenbaum was ordered as a midseason replacement for the 2014–15 season. Casting difficulties would result in the show's cancellation following the completion of the show's pilot episode, which never aired.

Mr. Dugan (1979)
This American sitcom starring Cleavon Little as a fledgling black congressman was to premiere on CBS and received substantial on-air promotion. The show was scrapped from CBS's schedule on March 7 after a disastrous special screening for members of the Congressional Black Caucus, who denounced Rep. Dugan's characterization as a bumbling man surrounded by a competent staff who would fix his gaffes.

Mogadishu, Minnesota (2017)
On 11 December 2015, K'naan Warsame's jihadi recruitment drama series The Recruiters was in development at HBO, on June 6, 2016, the network ordered a pilot for the series, which would focus on a Somali immigrant family and was retitled Mogadishu, Minnesota. On September 1, 2017, it was announced HBO would not be picking up the series.

(More Than) A Cooking Show With Alison Roman (2022)

Murder Police (2013)
An American animated detective-crime sitcom from Fox created and written by Jason Ruiz and Family Guy writer and producer David A. Goodman and developed by Goodman and Emily Spivey and was originally set to premiere as part of the network's Animation Domination block for the 2013–14 schedule. However on October 8, 2013, the series was pulled. Jason Ruiz went on to create Royal Crackers which aired on Adult Swim from 2023–2024 and ran for two seasons.

My Man Can (2013)
A British ITV dating game show axed following negative reviews before any of its episodes were aired. In 2023, presenter Melanie Sykes claimed that the show had broken TV gambling rules, but that she had been "thrown under the bus" by a press release claiming she and co-presenter Mark Wright hadn't understood the game.

Mystery Mansion (2003)
A 13-episode reality television series planned for broadcast by USA Network. The series brought "22 strangers to a secret location to catch a killer among them and claim the $1 million bounty." It was produced by Rocket Science Laboratories.

== N ==
NASCAR Wives (2009)
This TLC "docusoap" was to follow the lives of several wives and girlfriends of prominent NASCAR drivers. It was to be shown as a special after the 2009 Miss America Pageant, but the network changed its mind and decided to wait until after the 2009 Daytona 500. The series never made it to the air, despite being heavily promoted, due to a conflict between the parties involved with the making of the show. It was reported that TLC wanted to create in-show conflicts that were along the lines of traditional reality programs, namely fights among cast members, while the NASCAR Media Group had no interest in having their drivers and wives portrayed in a Footballers' Wives-esque negative light.

National Parks (2021)
ABC greenlit a pilot episode for National Parks, a crime procedural about the National Park Service. Kevin Costner would co-write and executive produce a pilot with Aaron Helbing and Jon Baird, while Anthony Hemingway was attached to direct the pilot episode and co-executive produce the series. The series would star Billy Campbell, Angel Parker, Gerardo Celasco, Ashlei Sharpe Chestnut, Blu Hunt, Tiffany Dupont and Guillermo Diaz. The pilot was dropped by ABC and would be reworked without Costner's involvement.

New Life+: Young Again in Another World (2018)
This anime adaptation of a light novel series of the same name by MINE would have followed Renya Kunugi, a Japanese Imperial Army war criminal who was reincarnated in a fantasy world. It was originally announced in May 2018 and would have been animated by Seven Arcs Pictures. The series was scheduled to air in October 2018, but was cancelled in June 2018 after massive backlash; namely, the work's plot, for its insensitive portrayal of historical events, along with the author's history of negative remarks towards citizens of China and South Korea. MINE would eventually apologize for his comments and delete his Twitter account. The cancellation also prompted the original light novel and the manga adaptation to be pulled indefinitely, although the manga adaptation resumed publication in August 2018 and ended in December 2021.

Next Caller (2013)
An NBC single-camera sitcom about battling radio hosts starring Dane Cook, Collette Wolfe, and Jeffrey Tambor. NBC scheduled the show as a midseason replacement for the 2012–13 season, but production was halted after filming only four of its six episode order, none of which aired.

== O ==
Off the Wall (1977)
An NBC comedy series set in a college dormitory. It was originally slated to air Sunday nights on the 1977 fall schedule, but it was taken off months beforehand after a broadcast of the pilot received low ratings. To compensate producer Universal Television, NBC agreed to bring back Universal's Baa Baa Black Sheep and ordered episodes of Richie Brockelman, Private Eye.

On the Ropes (1999)
This teen-aimed high school wrestling sitcom was slated to air on Kids' WB Saturday mornings, but never went into production after the network acquired Pokémon. Instead of its original plan to hold that series until January, the network carried reruns of the first season's episodes due to the franchise's overwhelming popularity at the time (including new episodes premiering in double-runs to keep up with the Japanese release schedule).

The One Percent (2017)
Starz was set to produce and air a television series about an organic farming family played by Ed Harris, Hilary Swank, and Ed Helms, written by Alejandro González Iñárritu, Alexander Dinelaris Jr., Nicolas Giacobone, and Armando Bó. Starz got a straight-to-series order, but dropped out in 2017 as the U.S. broadcaster of the series, with production company MRC shopping the project to other networks or streaming platforms.

The Ortegas (2003)
This Fox project starred Cheech Marin and was based on The Kumars at No. 42, a British hit about an Indian family that hosts their own talk show.

Our Little Genius (2010)
Fox picked up this Mark Burnett game show, hosted by Kevin Pollak, for a midseason debut to premiere after American Idol. On 7 January 2010, the premiere was postponed at the request of Burnett due to concerns about the show's integrity. Burnett had received reports that some contestants were given excessive information about the questions they were going to be asked, which would violate both FCC rules against manipulation of game shows and network standards and practices. The show was ultimately left unaired. In 2021, the Arizona Republic published accounts from a contestant supporting the reports, revealing that his father had been asked to ensure he knew about certain details that ultimately appeared in a question, and that the show had stopped tape and restarted the game after he had answered a question wrong, with a crew member telling him that they were guaranteeing contestants would win at least $10,000.

== P ==
The Partner (2004)
A ten-episode reality television series planned for broadcast by Fox. The series followed two teams of attorneys, one composed of Ivy League graduates and the other of graduates from less prestigious law schools, competing in a series of mock trial competitions. The series was set to premiere in November 2004, although it was delayed and subsequently canceled by October 2004.

Popetown (2005)
An animated series commissioned by the BBC which consisted of comical misrepresentations of the Roman Catholic church. After a sustained campaign from senior Catholic theologians, the series was never broadcast on the grounds that it was not of sufficient quality. However, Popetown made its debut on New Zealand music television network C4, and was released on DVD in September 2005.

Powerpuff (2021)
A live-action series for The CW based on characters from the 1998 animated series The Powerpuff Girls, first announced in August 2020. In this adaptation, Blossom, Bubbles, and Buttercup were to be portrayed as "disillusioned twentysomethings" resentful at having lost their childhood to crimefighting. In May 2021, after production on a pilot had begun a month earlier, it was announced that the pilot would be reworked. In July 2023, the project was reported to no longer be in development following Nexstar Media Group acquiring a majority of The CW. A trailer was leaked online in March 2025, to negative reaction from fans and media.

Press Ganged (2004)
A reality television series in which members of the public crew a ship and are judged on their seafaring skills, made by Granada Productions for ITV1 in the UK. Filmed in the summer of 2004, it appeared on lists of forthcoming series several times over the next year, but was never broadcast. No reason has ever been given.

Punky Duck (2026)
An animated TV series created by Jorge R. Gutierrez that in which the titular anthropomorphic duck and his friend Smiley Cat tour in Los Angeles with bizarre antics that parody various genres of television. It was one of three shows ordered by Prime Video through an initiative called the GenAI Creator Fund. The initiative received severe public backlash due to the use of generative AI, including from the creator of one of the other shows, and Gutierrez ultimately exited the project in response.

== R ==
Raising Caines (1995)
Judge Reinhold was set to star in this family sitcom alongside Mel Harris on NBC. Although it never aired in America, it did air in other countries.

Rani Mahal (2015)
The series revolved around the lives of an Indian king and his three wives: his 55-year-old wife, his 18-year-old wife, and his 12-year-old wife. Sakshi Tanwar and Reena Roy were cast in the production. By 2016, the series had been officially shelved; producer Vikas Gupta stated that it was due to the high financial investment required to produce the series.

Rewind (1998)
An American Fox sitcom following two advertising executives (Scott Baio and Mystro Clark) in the current day and in flashbacks to their experiences in the 1970s. The network heavily advertised the series, and it was featured in the 1997 fall preview of TV Guide, but it was canceled before any showings.

Ring My Bell (2024)
Based on the game of the same name from Ant & Dec's Saturday Night Takeaway, this gameshow on ITV1 would have been presented by comedian Chris Ramsey and his wife Rosie. The pilot episode was filmed in March 2024, but it never aired, and no further episodes were made.

Rising Star (2015)
The British version of the Israeli real-time talent show was ordered by ITV in November 2013 for broadcast in early 2015. The failure and complexities of the format for the American and German versions of the show ruled out ITV airing a domestic version of the series.

The Robert Taylor Show (1963)
NBC originally slated this Four Star series in its Thursday-night schedule, starring actor Robert Taylor as a troubleshooter for the U.S. Department of Health, Education, and Welfare with George Segal and Robert Loggia. The series was pulled for undisclosed reasons before airing.

Roman's Empire (2009)
An American adaptation of the British comedy was planned for ABC's 2008–09 midseason schedule, but was later pushed to the fall season. The project, starring Kelsey Grammer, was officially passed on as Grammer was working on Hank at the time (which itself was canceled after airing five episodes).

Rosang Agimat (2019)
A planned Filipino action series was scheduled for GMA Network that would have featured Gabbi Garcia in the lead title role. In 2019, production was halted after co-star Eddie Garcia got involved in an accident that led to his untimely death resulting the series to be scrapped without airing a single episode.

Roque Santeiro (1975)
A Brazilian telenovela produced by TV Globo, written by Dias Gomes, starring Betty Faria, Lima Duarte, and Francisco Cuoco. The telenovela was scheduled to premiere on August 27, 1975. It was cancelled after being banned by the Brazilian government (at the time, a military dictatorship), as wiretaps planted by DOPS, the secret police of the regime, revealed that the telenovela was based on Gomes' play O Berço do Herói, which had been banned by government censorship. The government alleged that the telenovela was an offense against morality and good habits. In 1985, after redemocratization, the telenovela was re-recorded and shown in a new version, also written by Gomes, although with a different cast.

The Runner (2002)
LivePlanet, the multi-media company formed by Matt Damon and Ben Affleck, announced The Runner in 2001 to air on ABC. The premise would have a runner compete for a $1 million-plus prize by completing a series of missions across the country while three agents try to capture him. The show would have an internet twist: not only could potential contestants apply to be runners or agents online, but viewers could win a share of the pot by digging up and sharing clues about the runner's whereabouts on the internet. The series never aired after the September 11 attacks made the premise of a fictional fugitive evading capture for prizes commercially unpopular, and LivePlanet shifted to a more traditional drama series, Push, Nevada, which aired in 2002. A version of the show was finally launched in 2016 by Verizon's go90 streaming service.

== S ==
Schimmel (2000)
American Fox sitcom starring comedian Robert Schimmel with Mike Scully serving as executive producer was shelved when Schimmel underwent treatment for non-Hodgkin lymphoma.

Scooby-Doo! and the Mystery Pups (2024)
A spinoff series that was slated to be released on Cartoon Network and HBO Max in 2024 but was scrapped in March 2023. It would have been the first Scooby-Doo series aimed at a preschool audience.

Secret Service Guy (1997)
Judge Reinhold was slated to star in this sitcom, which Fox decided not to air.

Septuplets (2003)
Another unrealized Fox commitment, this one about a set of 16-year-old septuplets who run an upscale beachfront hotel with their parents.

Seriously, Dude, I'm Gay (2004)
A two-hour reality television special planned for broadcast by Fox. The special was set to air on June 7, 2004, although it was abruptly shelved only eleven days before its intended broadcast. The special depicted two straight men in competition for a $50,000 reward over who could pass themselves off as the more convincing gay man. In addition to competing in daily challenges, the two contestants were required to move into separate lofts with gay roommates, come out to their best friends, and socialize at gay nightclubs. According to executive producer Ray Giuliani, the LGBTQ+ media monitoring organization GLAAD played a significant role in the special's cancelation.

Seven Days (1985)
A proposed ABC newsmagazine series to have been anchored by Kathleen Sullivan that would have reviewed the major national and world news stories of the previous week. The network decided against putting the series into production. The show is, according to the network, not to be confused with New Zealand network TV3's 2009 show 7 Days, a comedic current events game show hosted by New Zealand comedian Jeremy Corbett.

Sex Bomb (2004)
A French adaptation of reality television series Strip Search : the Real Full Monty that was to air on TF1. The judges were Cathy Guetta, Lynda Lacoste, Thierry Calmont, and Virginie (a choreographer). It was produced by Endemol and took place in a club in Paris called Pink Paradise. The aim was to form a male striptease act (à la the Chippendale dancers). Eight episodes of the show were filmed in May 2004. While the show was first scheduled to air during summer of 2004, the show faced delays due to its sensationalist format, before it was ultimately scrapped by TF1 with no episodes aired.

The Singles Table (2007)
NBC announced this sitcom as a midseason replacement, centered on five people who meet after they are placed at the worst table at a wedding. However, the series was pulled without explanation before airing.

Snip (1976)
Comedian David Brenner was slated to star in this sitcom, where he would portray a hairdresser dealing with his ex-wife (Lesley Ann Warren) moving back in with him. Created by James Komack, who had earlier created Chico and the Man and Welcome Back, Kotter, Snip was heavily promoted by NBC; however, after seven episodes were written and five were filmed, the network decided to pull the show at the last minute. The show was scrapped so abruptly that TV Guide still listed the show in its schedules. Brenner later stated that he believed the pulling was due to fears of controversy, as one of the supporting characters was openly gay, quipping that apparently "in 1976, there were no gay people in America." The five completed episodes later aired in Australia.

Space (2022)
TBS was producing Hilary Winston's Space, a romantic-comedy series about a married couple on the verge of a breakup, are granted the ultimate "space" to figure out their future when they suddenly begin jumping into the bodies of other couples. Jake Lacy & Krysta Rodriguez headlined the series, while Ally Maki, Caleb Hearon, and Rachel Pegram were cast in recurring roles. Andrew Mogel and Jarrad Paul were attached to direct the pilot episode through Sony Pictures Television & Nicholas Stoller's Stoller Global Solutions production company. Space was filmed in Portland, Oregon for TBS to air at a unknown date. The show was canceled due to Brett Weitz's exit from TBS as a result of Discovery, Inc. and Warner Bros.'s merger.

Star Trek: Phase II (1978)
A planned revival of Star Trek that was to air on a proposed Paramount Pictures television network. When plans for the network fell through with 13 episodes written, the first script of Phase II was given an expanded budget and became Star Trek: The Motion Picture while two others later became episodes of Star Trek: The Next Generation. In 2008, the online fan-film project Star Trek: The New Voyages changed its name to "Star Trek: Phase II" and announced it would be adding at least one new character that had been created for the abandoned 1970s series. Pre-production of Phase II had progressed to the point of costume design, preliminary casting, screen tests, and some set design. Footage of all three survives and was included as bonus features on the 2001 DVD release of the "Director's Cut" of The Motion Picture.

Star Wars Detours (2013)
A comedic take on the Star Wars series created by the creators of Robot Chicken. Disney's acquisition of Lucasfilm caused the series to be put on hold. Star Wars: The Clone Wars was canceled with rumors stating that Detours would make the move to Disney XD. A total of 39 episodes have been completed, but has been shelved indefinitely as the franchise took a new direction under Disney's leadership.

Still Life (2003)
Family drama television show created for Fox. Six episodes were made but never aired.

Street Car Showdown (2021)
A BBC reality show created by Ant and Dec's Mitre Studios and Studio Lambert in which teams around the UK are given money to fix up second hand cars in ten days and then race each other. A pilot was filmed in 2019, but in 2021 it was announced that it would not be given a full series.

Stuck to ODB (2004)
A Spike TV reality series created by Paul Wernick and Rhett Reese that challenged an average man to remain within 10 feet of American rapper Ol' Dirty Bastard for an entire week to win a cash prize. Three to four episodes of the series were shot in the summer of 2004, though none of them would ultimately be broadcast due to Ol' Dirty Bastard's death from an accidental drug overdose in November of that same year.

Sue Sue in the City (2018)
In November 2018, ABC decided to pass on a spinoff of The Middle it ordered to series, which would center on Sue Sue Heck (Eden Sher) moving to Chicago and working in a hotel after the end of The Middle. After ABC canceled the spinoff without airing the pilot, Warner Bros. Television shopped it to other networks but it was never picked up.

The Surjury (2019–20)
A Channel 4 reality series that was to be presented by Caroline Flack in which a jury of twelve members of the public must decide if an ordinary person deserves cosmetic surgery. The show's premise was criticized by several public figures, most notably, Jameela Jamil, when it was announced in October 2019. In February 2020, the series was set aside after Flack's suicide.

Surprise with Jenny McCarthy (2012–13)
NBC announced an American adaptation of the British variety show Surprise, Surprise fronted by Jenny McCarthy, but it was revealed to have quietly been scrapped at the January Television Critics Association Press Tour.

== T ==
Tattertown (1989)
A creation of Ralph Bakshi, this animated series for Nickelodeon was to focus on a community where inanimate objects thrown away as garbage come to life. Nickelodeon had given a 39-episode series order to the show, which would have been the network's first original animated series, but canceled the show in the wake of controversies surrounding Bakshi's other series, Mighty Mouse: The New Adventures. Nickelodeon would air the pilot episode, "Christmas in Tattertown", several times in the late 1980s and early 1990s as a Christmas special. Nickelodeon eventually received their first original cartoons with Doug, Rugrats and The Ren & Stimpy Show in 1991.

Then Churchill Said to Me (1982)
A BBC sitcom set during World War II starring Frankie Howerd, in the style of Howerd's previous series Up Pompeii! and Whoops Baghdad. After the show was fully filmed, it was not broadcast, officially due to concerns about the sensitivity of showing a war-time sitcom following the outbreak of the Falklands War. The show eventually premiered on satellite channel UK Gold in 1993 – a year after Howerd's death – and was finally broadcast on BBC Two in 2000.

Thick and Thin (2006)
This sitcom starred Jessica Capshaw as a formerly overweight woman who was struggling to commit herself to a healthier lifestyle amid the objections of her still-overweight family and friends. Six episodes were produced as a midseason replacement for NBC's 2005–06 season, but none were aired. Due to the premature cancellation, Saturday Night Live cast member Chris Parnell and writer Paula Pell returned to working on SNL.

Three Women (2023)
A Showtime original series based on the 2019 book of the same name by Lisa Taddeo. This series was about a group of women who were going to change their lives. On January 30, 2023, Showtime announced the series would not be airing on the network due to the corporate reorganization of their parent company Paramount Global. The series eventually aired on 13 September 2024, on Starz.

Tokyo Babylon 2021 (2021)
Anime adaptation of the manga by CLAMP animated by GoHands that was scheduled to air in April 2021. In November 2020, the anime was delayed as it was accused of plagiarizing costumes for the characters Subaru and Hokuto. In December 2020, the company apologized for the plagiarism. In March 2021, it was announced the anime was canceled after more examples of plagiarism were discovered during an investigation by the production committee for the series. CLAMP is planning to work on an entirely new production based on Tokyo Babylon.

Tonari no 801-chan (2009)
Anime adaption of the manga that was scheduled to air on TBS in Japan. For unknown reasons, the series was canceled on 29 August 2008.

Top Gear (2009)
An American version of the cult British show of the same name, hosted by Adam Carolla, Tanner Foust,and Eric Stromer, was announced in mid-June by NBC to premiere as a midseason replacement in 2009. Although studio segments which were taped on July 26 for the pilot were generally favorably reviewed (hewing close to the UK version's format), NBC reversed its decision in December, citing the failure of Knight Rider. The show was picked up by History in 2010, with Rutledge Wood and Adam Ferrara replacing Stromer and Carolla respectively.

12 Miles of Bad Road (2008)
The brainchild of comedic writer Linda Bloodworth-Thomason, the show centered on a Texas matriarch who must reconcile her booming real-estate business and immense wealth with the day-to-day struggles of her dysfunctional family. Ten episodes were ordered by HBO, but only six were shot due to the contemporary writers' strike. On 17 March 2008, HBO confirmed that they were not planning to air the show. The creators attempted to shop the episodes around to other networks without success.

== U ==
Ultimate Slip 'N Slide (2021)
American game show, based on the Slip 'N Slide water toy, that was scheduled to premiere on NBC after its primetime airing of the 2020 Summer Olympics closing ceremony and hosted by Bobby Moynihan and Ron Funches. In July 2021, it reported that production would be halted temporarily after a crew member contracted giardia and it spread through the crew. In August 2021, it was announced that NBC would not be moving forward with the series. Although production was halted 7 weeks into the intended 8 weeks of filming, the format of the show, an ongoing competition with a definitive conclusion, meant that the final competition for the grand prize had not been filmed, and production's attempts to edit the show in absence of its proper conclusion were ultimately passed on. NBC president Susan Rosner Rovner had reportedly spent $18 million on the production of the show. Its slot for lead in program following the closing ceremony of the 2020 Summer Olympics was replaced by Family Game Fight!.

Untitled Jay Williams project (2015)
Nonfiction docuseries spin-off of Iyanla: Fix My Life on OWN featuring a man fathered 34 children with 17 different women attempting to put his life together with the help of Iyanla Vanzant. The show was canceled before production was completed.

Untitled North Carolina Football docuseries (2025)
This series would've focused on the 2025 North Carolina Tar Heels football team under first-year college head coach and multi-time Super Bowl champion Bill Belichick, most notable for his role as head coach of the New England Patriots during their 2000s and 2010s dynasty. The docuseries was announced by Belichick himself during a team meeting before the start of the season and would have been produced by EverWonder Studios and streamed on Hulu that fall. After a poor 2–3 start to the season, being outscored by their three Power 4 (major conference) opponents 120-33, and only winning against Charlotte and FCS Richmond, the documentary was reportedly scrapped. Both the poor record and concerns Hulu wanted to focus on Belichick and his girlfriend Jordon Hudson's personal lives were partly to blame.

Us & Them (2013)
American remake of the popular British sitcom Gavin & Stacey starring Jason Ritter as Gavin and Alexis Bledel as Stacey. After a six-month-long online romance, Gavin, who lives in New York, and Stacey, who lives in Pennsylvania, decide to meet in person. Their crazy families and friends constantly interfere in their budding relationship, which becomes more of a challenge than living in different states. The show was originally given a 13 episode order but that was later cut to 7 episodes, with Fox deciding not to air the completed episodes. It eventually aired on Sony Crackle in the fall of 2018, allowing Sony Pictures Television to air the series in some form.

== V ==
The Venery of Samantha Bird (2023)
This Starz drama series's production was shut down with two of its eight episodes not yet filmed due to the 2023 Writers Guild of America strike, and was canceled shortly before the end of that strike without airing any of the six completed episodes.

Videosyncrazy (2015)
In June 2015, HBO shut down production on Videosyncrazy, a half-hour comedy series that was set in 1983 and followed a college dropout who moves to Hollywood with dreams of making a sci-fi epic, but ends up working on music videos. The series was canceled after it had filmed four or five episodes. David Fincher had directed multiple episodes starring Charlie Rowe, Sam Page, Jason Flemyng, Kerry Condon, and Elizabeth Lail. The first season was to begin with the making of the video for Berlin's song "The Metro" and would have concluded with the filming of Michael Jackson's Thriller. The series was written by Rich Wilkes and Bob Stephenson. Wilkes described it as "a half-hour show in the vein of something like Entourage or Veep."

== W ==
The Walt Disney Magic Hour (1998)
A travelogue series of the Walt Disney Parks and Resorts hosted by George Foreman was intended to debut as part of PAX's debut lineup, but never made it to air.

Waterfront (2007)
CBS ordered this drama, which dealt with the political and personal lives around the mayor of Providence, Rhode Island, as a midseason replacement series that would be loosely based on the life of former Providence mayor Buddy Cianci. After completing production on five episodes, the network decided to cancel the series, citing creative and financial issues.

Welcome to the Neighborhood (2005)
A six-episode reality television series planned for broadcast by ABC. The series was set to premiere on July 10, 2005, but was abruptly shelved only ten days before its intended broadcast. The series depicted seven diverse families in competition for a lavish house located in Circle C Ranch, an upscale subdivision of Austin, Texas. In order to win the house, the competing families participated in a series of challenges in an effort to gain the approval of three conservative white families that resided in the neighborhood. The series received fierce backlash from advocacy groups, who alleged that it promoted intolerance against minority groups and violated the Fair Housing Act. An adaptation of the series aired in Germany for nearly two full seasons on RTL II.

When I Grow Up (2001)
Also known as Fling, When I Grow Up was an American romantic comedy for the Fox network created by Glenn Gordon Caron. The show was canceled after six episodes were completed, none of which aired.

When Women Rule the World (2007 and 2008)
An American reality show for the Fox network, the show revolved around sending 12 women and 12 men to a "primitive location" where the men were forced to be subservient to the women, with the women voting off one man per week. The final man left would win $250,000. The show was announced in early 2007, but its debut was delayed to June 2, 2008, then delayed again in April before the network scrapped it permanently. A version was later produced for the United Kingdom.

Where's the Fire? (1974)
A sitcom about volunteer firemen; scenes from the pilot were shown in ABC's 1974–75 season promo reel, but the show was withdrawn before its launch.

== See also ==
- List of television series canceled after one episode
