= Married by America =

2003 reality television series

- Genre: Reality television
- Presented by: Sean Valentine
- Country of origin: United States
- Original language: English
- No. of seasons: 1
- No. of episodes: 8

Production
- Executive producers: Ted Haimes; Chris Cowan; Jean-Michel Michenaud
- Producer: Douglas C. Forbes
- Running time: 60 minutes
- Production company: Rocket Science Laboratories

Original release
- Network: Fox
- Release: March 3 – April 14, 2003

Married by America is an American reality television series broadcast by the Fox Broadcasting Company (Fox). The series premiered on March 3, 2003, and its eighth and final episode aired on April 14, 2003. American DJ Sean Valentine hosted the series. It was produced by the production company Rocket Science Laboratories (Joe Millionaire, Temptation Island).

In 2005, Married by America was one of several television programs cited in a class-action lawsuit filed by the Writers Guild of America concerning labor law violations.

== Format ==
Five single people agreed to be paired up sight unseen with strangers chosen by America. The five newly minted couples met and got engaged on the spot. This was accomplished through family members and phone-in votes by TV viewers. The five couples were Matt and Cortez (a friendly if awkward man and an attractive/uninterested woman who later claimed she was attracted to "the abusers"), Jennifer and Xavier (cold, unfriendly blonde woman and low-key Frenchman model), Stephen and Denise (uncomfortable average guy and low self-esteem woman who liked him much more than he liked her), Jill and Kevin (NHL team hostess and Catholic "daddy's girl" and a former pro baseball player seeking a new career), and Billie Jean and Tony (party girl and general bro).

Next, the five couples were sequestered at Copper North Ranch for an engagement period. Relationship Experts (Dr. Jenn Bermann, Dr. Don Elium and Ms. P.) eliminated one couple per week, and the final two couples could decide whether or not they wanted to wed.

In the end, neither of the couples (Jill Nicolini and Kevin, Billie Jean Houle and Tony) opted to get married.

== Production ==
On October 30, 2002, Fox sent out a press release for Married by America. The series was based on the concept of an arranged marriage, with Fox president of alternative entertainment Mike Darnell stating "It’s different, it’s unusual, and it’s the first time anything like this has been tried in [the United States.] Ultimately, it’s up to the individuals if they’re going to get married. But hopefully, if it works, they’ll fall in love."

== Episodes ==
No.	Title	Original release date	US viewers (millions)
1	"Episode 1"	March 3, 2003	8.67
2	"Episode 2"	March 5, 2003	N/A
3	"Episode 3"	March 10, 2003	6.90
4	"Episode 4"	March 17, 2003	6.40
5	"Episode 5"	March 24, 2003	N/A
6	"Episode 6"	March 31, 2003	6.70
7	"Episode 7"	April 7, 2003	7.50
8	"Episode 8"	April 14, 2003	7.85

== Reception ==
Sheerly Avni of Salon criticized the series as "an orgy of vanilla heterophilia, a fantasy of a straight, lily-white America that should have gone the way of the original Star Trek enterprise."

== Controversies ==
WRAZ, a Fox affiliate in the Raleigh-Durham area, refused to broadcast future episodes of the series following the premiere of the second episode. The affiliate claimed that they contacted Fox to express their concerns over the series' concept, in which they stated that it "demeans and exploits the institution of marriage."

=== FCC fine ===
In the penultimate episode of Married by America, the contestants were thrown Bachelor and Bachelorette parties that featured strippers. At the parties, some contestants were depicted licking whipped cream off the body of a stripper while another contestant, who was only wearing underwear, was spanked by two strippers. While some of the strippers were topless, all nudity was pixelated. The sexual nature of the scenes received fierce backlash from the media monitoring organization the Parents Television and Media Council. Over a year after the show's cancellation, the FCC fined Fox a record $1.2 million claiming that the episode violated the FCC's decency laws. The ruling underwent great scrutiny when blogger Jeff Jarvis uncovered that although the FCC originally claimed to have received 159 complaints, it later admitted to only receiving 90, which came from only 23 people. Jarvis studied the complaints and determined that all but two were virtually identical to each other, meaning that the $1.2 million judgment was based on original complaints written by a total of only three people. The fine was reduced to $91,000 in January 2009. On September 21, 2012, the United States Department of Justice dismissed the lawsuit.
