= When Women Rule the World =

2008 reality television series

- Genre: Reality television
- Presented by: Judi Shekoni
- Country of origin: United States
- Original language: English
- No. of seasons: 1
- No. of episodes: 12

Production
- Executive producers: Jean-Michel Michenaud; Chris Cowan; Charles Duncombe
- Production location: Fiji
- Running time: 1 hour
- Production company: Rocket Science Laboratories

Original release
- Network: Fox
- Release: June 2, 2008 (unaired)

When Women Rule the World is an American reality television series. Filmed on Mana Island, the series depicted a competition among a group of twelve chauvinistic men who were required to be subservient to a group of ten strong-minded women. The men were tasked with building shelter and locating survival supplies, in addition to obeying any commands of the women. The women voted to eliminate a contestant at the end of each episode, with the final contestant receiving a reward of $250,000. When Women Rule the World was originally planned for broadcast in 2007 by the Fox Broadcasting Company (Fox); however, after a series of delays, it was cancelled by the network. The series was eventually broadcast in Belgium and Finland in 2010. The series was hosted by English television personality Judi Shekoni.

In September 2008, an adaptation of the series premiered in the United Kingdom on Channel 4.

== Format ==
Set in Fiji, the series depicted a competition among a group of twelve chauvinistic men who were required to be subservient to a group of ten strong-minded women. The series was hosted by English television personality Judi Shekoni.

== Announcement and reception ==
On January 17, 2007, Fox sent out a press release for When Women Rule the World.

== Cancellation ==
Mike Darnell, Fox's head of reality programming, explained that the series was shelved due to being dormant for too long. He commented: "[When Women Rule the World] will never make it [to the schedule]. Nothing's wrong with it, it just sat on the shelf too long. Sometimes things sit on the shelf too long and get old." However, contestant Tara Filer attributed the series' cancellation to "some sort of head butting between" Fox and Rocket Science Laboratories.

The series eventually aired in Finland.

== Adaptation ==
An adaptation of the series, which was also titled When Women Rule the World, was broadcast in the United Kingdom on Channel 4. The eight-episode series premiered on September 4, 2008, and it was hosted by Welsh television presenter Steve Jones. Filmed in the Dominican Republic, the series followed ten men in competition for a reward of €30,000 (US$33,141); in order to win the reward, the men were required to act as personal servants for a group of eight women. One of the men were eliminated from the competition each week by the group in exchange for supplies. Speaking on the adaptation, executive producer Peter Davey stated: "We have changed it quite a lot. We've created more set pieces, which the Americans didn't have."

== See also ==
- List of television series canceled before airing an episode
