= My Big Fat Obnoxious Boss =

2004 reality television series

- Genre: Reality television
- Country of origin: United States
- Original language: English
- No. of seasons: 1
- No. of episodes: 10

Production
- Executive producers: Jean-Michel Michenaud; Chris Cowan; Ray Giuliani
- Production locations: Chicago, Illinois
- Running time: 42–46 minutes
- Production company: Rocket Science Laboratories

Original release
- Network: Fox
- Release: November 7 – December 12, 2004

Related
- My Big Fat Obnoxious Fiance

My Big Fat Obnoxious Boss is an American reality television series broadcast by the Fox Broadcasting Company (Fox). The series premiered on November 7, 2004, while its tenth and final episode aired on December 12, 2004. Filmed in Chicago, Illinois, the series depicted twelve contestants in competition for a position at a venture capital firm.

Similar to My Big Fat Obnoxious Fiance, it was a parody of shows such as The Apprentice. The contestants performed several tasks that they were all told would help them win a job at the Chicago-based conglomerate IOCOR and a $250,000 prize. However, none of the contestants knew that the company – and the position – were fake. The show was usually punctuated by the actions of the "boss" Mr. N. Paul Todd, whose name was an anagram of that of Donald Trump. The contestants learn about his multibillion-dollar venture capital firm IOCOR, and in any episode, he or a member of his "family" could usually be found doing something either to unsettle the contestants or to test the limit of their blindness to truth. The show received low ratings in the United States and was canceled after five episodes. Fox released the remaining 5 episodes online in late March 2005. In 2005, My Big Fat Obnoxious Boss was one of several television programs cited in a class-action lawsuit filed by the Writers Guild of America concerning labor law violations.

== Format ==
The rules of the game were similar to The Apprentice. The teams would then compete in a challenge test the contestant's skills in business-related objectives - however, the tasks are absurd in nature, included selling hot soup on a hot day, creating and selling art they made out of scraps and promoting other ridiculous products. The members of the losing team met Mr. Todd in the boardroom on the next day, where he derided their performance. The team boss nominated two teammates for elimination – Unlike The Apprentice (where the team leader is also eligible for elimination alongside their nominees), the losing boss is awarded total Immunity from that week's elimination because Mr. Todd explained that, in real life, the boss is never held responsible. The audience would then see N. Paul Todd referring to "the real boss" for the decision on who was to go between the bottom 2. The player not eliminated became the team boss, and the winning team named a new team boss.

The real boss was not seen or heard until the final episode and was kept a complete secret from the contestants. The official website suggested that the real boss could be Donald Trump's ex-wife Ivana Trump or Oprah Winfrey, although David Hickman did refer to the boss as a "him." The real boss gave no reason for the decision, so Todd was given free rein to make it up as he went along. In the final episode, "the real boss" was revealed to be a chimpanzee who responded to the name of "Mowgli" and who made his decisions by spinning a wheel with the names of the contestants.

== Production ==
N. Paul Todd was played by actor William August, a graduate of Harvard University and an experienced California attorney. August described Todd as a man who "probably has a number of sexual harassment lawsuits pending." A variety of assistants helped Mr. Todd with his contests. His alleged Vice President Jamie Samuels is sent to hate the women, while the COO David Hickman is "a little too excited about these fresh-faced young men." Mr. Todd also relies on his wife Lynn and his son Kent to help judge the competition when a member of the executive team is not available.

Fox originally announced the legal reality television series The Partner for a premiere date of November 7, 2004, however, it opted to broadcast My Big Fat Obnoxious Boss instead. Gail Berman explained "We had a lot of fun with Fiance, and this seemed like the next logical take on what’s going on in reality right now".

== Cast ==
Role	Real name	"Position"
N. Paul Todd	William August	The Obnoxious Boss
Jamie Samuels	Jamie Denbo	Executive Vice President, IOCOR
David Hickman	David Jahn	Chief Operations Officer (COO), IOCOR
Lynn Todd	Tamara Clatterbuck	Wife of N. Paul Todd
Kent Todd	Kent Sublette	Son of N. Paul Todd
Danielle Todd	Danielle Schneider	Daughter of N. Paul Todd
Shannon	Shannon Hall	Executive Assistant to N. Paul Todd
Jason	Jason Kollar	Bodyguard to N. Paul Todd
Michael Delaney	Michael Keenan	IOCOR Board Member
John Benjamin	John Gilbert	IOCOR Board Member

== Contestants ==
Team 1	Team 2
Femron	Concad

Candidate	Age	Hometown	Result
Annette Dziamba – Business Development Executive	24	Whippany, New Jersey	Winner of $350,000
Michael Gregorio – Liquor Distribution Executive	34	Reading, Massachusetts	Runner-up; winner of $200,000
Kerry McCloskey – Media Marketing Director	29	Jersey City, New Jersey	Eliminated in episode 10
Damien Scott – Strategic Financial Consultant	29	Chicago, Illinois	Eliminated in episode 9
David Harper – Certified Financial Accountant	25	Atlanta, Georgia	Eliminated in episode 8
Douglas Dennard – Equity Research Analyst	24	Greenville, North Carolina	Eliminated in episode 7
Whitney LaBelle – Shipping Executive	26	Atlanta, Georgia	Eliminated in episode 6
Robert Hospidor – Mortgage Broker	28	Middlesex, New Jersey	Eliminated in episode 5
Tonia Jacobs – Aerial Construction Worker	35	San Marcos, Texas	Eliminated in episode 4
Elli Frank – Marketing Firm President	26	Jacksonville, Florida	Eliminated in episode 3
Christy Hollie – Entrepreneur	30	Austin, Texas	Eliminated in episode 2
Daniel Richardson – Automobile Finance Manager	29	Lewisville, Texas	Eliminated in episode 1

== Teams ==
The contestants were initially split into a male and female team. Each team was responsible for naming their opponent. The men named the female team Femron, a portmanteau of female and Enron. The women named the male team Concad, a portmanteau of con and cad.

The teams were re-organized in episode 4 based on the contestants' attractiveness. At the beginning of episode 8, the remaining five players were combined into a united team for an elimination, where Damien was named team boss. Afterwards, the four players left over were split into two teams for the episode's challenge. Following that challenge, the three finalists were on their own.

Candidate	Episode 1 team	Episode 4 team	Episode 8 team	Result	Team Boss (Win/Loss)
Annette Dziamba	Femron	Femron	Femron	Winner	1-2 (win in task 5, loss in tasks 2 & 7)
Michael Gregorio	Concad	Femron	Concad	Runner-up	0-1 (loss in task 1)
Kerry McCloskey	Femron	Concad	Femron	Eliminated in episode 10	0-2 (loss in tasks 3 & 5)
Damien Scott	Concad	Concad	Concad	Eliminated in episode 9	2-0 (win in tasks 3 & 7)
David Harper	Concad	Concad		Eliminated in episode 8	1-1 (win in task 6, loss in task 4)
Douglas Dennard	Concad	Femron		Eliminated in episode 7	0-1 (loss in task 6)
Whitney LaBelle	Femron	Femron		Eliminated in episode 6	1-0 (win in task 4)
Robert Hospidor	Concad	Concad		Eliminated in episode 5	1-0 (win in task 2)
Tonia Jacobs	Femron	Concad		Eliminated in episode 4	1-0 (win in task 1)
Elli Frank	Femron			Eliminated in episode 3	
Christy Hollie	Femron			Eliminated in episode 2	
Daniel Richardson	Concad			Eliminated in episode 1	

Elimination chart
Candidate	1	2	3	4	5	6	7	8	9	10	11
Annette	IN	LOSE	IN	IN	WIN	BR	LOSE	IN	WIN	IN	WIN
Michael	LOSE	IN	IN	IN	IN	IN	BR	IN	BR	WIN	FIRED
Kerry	IN	BR	LOSE	BR	LOSE	IN	IN	IN	WIN	FIRED	
Damien	IN	IN	WIN	IN	IN	IN	WIN	WIN	FIRED		
David	IN	IN	IN	LOSE	BR	WIN	IN	FIRED			
Douglas	IN	IN	IN	IN	IN	LOSE	FIRED				
Whitney	IN	IN	BR	WIN	IN	FIRED					
Robert	BR	WIN	IN	IN	FIRED						
Tonia	WIN	IN	IN	FIRED							
Elli	IN	IN	FIRED								
Christy	IN	FIRED									
Daniel	FIRED										

The contestant won the competition.
The contestant won as team boss on his/her team.
The contestant lost as team boss on his/her team - but was awarded immunity per the rules.
The contestant was on the winning team for this task.
The contestant was on the losing team for this task.
The contestant was brought to the final boardroom.
The contestant was fired.
The contestant won a task granting him/her immunity.

== Episodes ==
No.	Title	Original release date	US viewers (millions)
1	"How Low Can You Go?"	November 7, 2004	4.4
Mr. Todd introduces himself, his company, and the game to the contestants over hors d'oeuvres made from cheap ingredients. He splits the contestants into men's and women's teams and assigns the teams to come up with the opposing team's names.
2	"The Sword and the Soup"	November 14, 2004	N/A
Mr. Todd invites six of the contestants to tour his mansion and meet his wife and daughter. The mansion features Todd's most prized possessions, including two vases belonging to Napoleon, a 1929 Steinway piano, chandeliers identical to those in the West Wing, the Excalibur sword, and his first million dollars.
3	"That's Fascinating"	November 21, 2004	N/A
Mr. Todd invites three women to join him on the yacht Perseverance II and three men to join him at Harborside International Golf Center. Mr. Todd gave the women bikinis on the boat and after going swimming in Lake Michigan, but did not show up to his appointment with the men, leaving them waiting for over three hours. Todd also leads the women to think that as a result of the boat trip they have forged a close relationship with him, whereas all he has ever said in conversation with each of them is "that's fascinating".
4	"Craptacular!"	December 5, 2004	4.1
The teams sell bogus products to the public and the most sales wins. Products include canned oxygen gas, "natural" tampons, and reusable toilet paper.
5	"Thanks, I Appreciate That"	December 12, 2004	3.4
The teams raced to perform certain office tasks while under fire from paintballs that Mr. N. Paul Todd shot at them. Members had to shield the team boss from getting hit or be penalized. A tie breaker came down to a 10 ball shootout.
6	"Next Stop, the Guggenheim!"	Unaired	N/A
The teams make works of art out of garbage and sell them at an art gallery they run themselves. One of the members of each team has to masquerade as the artist who made the works of art.
7	"Drop Dead Gorgeous"	Unaired	N/A
The teams design an advertising campaign for 1 of 3 products. They include home security land mines, breast milk, and plastic surgery for the deceased.
8	"Blowin' in the Wind"	Unaired	N/A
The teams sell as much distribution of T-shirts, baseball hats, and mugs that had written on them "Chicago is for losers", "The windy city blows", and "I hate Chicago" to real shop owners as possible.
9	"My Kingdom for a Chicken"	Unaired	N/A
The contestants are given a live chicken, and are challenged to barter their way to an item of higher value. The contestant with the item receiving the lowest appraised value is eliminated.
10	"The Real Boss is..."	Unaired	N/A
Two IOCOR Board Members questioned the Final 2 about the competition and Mr. Todd before the corporation could declare a winner. Then, the joking nature of the show was revealed. However, the Finalists were told that the competition was still real and the intended prize money was increased to $350,000. After one final "decision" from "the real boss" (now revealed to be a spin of the wheel by Mowgli), Annette won the competition. Runner-Up Mike was then revealed to have won a consolation prize of $200,000 and both finalists were told one final time to "Get The Hell out of Mr. Todd's Office".

== After the show ==
Annette became a professional model, and ironically, later appeared as "Trump's Executive Assistant" (boardroom lobby receptionist) on several episodes of The Celebrity Apprentice. Kerry wrote a book. As of 2007, Elli remained the president of Eye5. Jamie Denbo and Kent Sublette both moved on to late night television programs, with Denbo being featured on The Late Late Show and Sublette joining the writing staff of Saturday Night Live in 2007. Robert appeared on the 2014 reality show Utopia.
