= My Big Fat Obnoxious Fiance =

2004 reality television series

- Genre: Reality television
- Presented by: Claudia DiFolco
- Starring: Steven Bailey; Randi Coy
- Country of origin: United States
- Original language: English
- No. of seasons: 1
- No. of episodes: 6

Production
- Executive producers: Chris Cowan; Jean-Michel Michenaud; Ray Giuliani
- Production locations: Los Angeles, California
- Running time: 25 minutes
- Production company: Rocket Science Laboratories

Original release
- Network: Fox
- Release: January 19 – February 23, 2004

Related
- My Big Fat Obnoxious Boss

My Big Fat Obnoxious Fiance is an American reality television series broadcast by Fox. The six-episode series premiered on January 19, 2004, and concluded on February 23, 2004. Filmed in Los Angeles, California, the series followed Randi Coy, a 23-year-old teacher, in competition for a $1 million reward. In order to win the reward, Coy was required to convince her family and friends that she was engaged to and planned to elope with Steven Williams, an ill-mannered 29-year-old man. If any of Coy's family members refused to attend her wedding or objected during the ceremony, Coy would lose the competition. Coy was under the impression that Williams was another contestant competing for a monetary reward, however, he was actually Steven Bailey, an actor hired to thwart her attempt to win the competition. The series was hosted by Canadian actor Claudia DiFolco.

My Big Fat Obnoxious Fiance received mixed reception from television critics; some critics found the series entertaining while others believed the premise was contrived. The series garnered high ratings and was one of the top viewed reality television programs of the 2003–04 television season. While the series did not spawn a second season, its success resulted in a 2004 spin-off titled My Big Fat Obnoxious Boss. In 2005, My Big Fat Obnoxious Fiance was one of several television programs cited in a class-action lawsuit filed by the Writers Guild of America concerning labor law violations.

== Format ==
An elementary school teacher named Randi Coy is offered $250,000 for herself and $250,000 for the rest of her family if she takes part in a fake wedding engagement to a man named "Steve Williams," who will also win $250,000 for himself and $250,000 for his family. They have to convince their families of their engagement and get married in 12 days time with all their family members attending and without any of them objecting, in order to win the money. However, what Randi does not know is that Steve is, in reality, a professional actor, whose goal is to make things difficult for Randi.

In the first episode, things get complicated as the fake fiance is revealed to be the very annoying and unattractive man who fits the show's title. The revelation of the engagement to Randi's family intentionally causes tension. The episodes after continue to follow Randi, Steve, and the Coys as they prepare for the wedding. To make matters more crazy, the Coys meet Steve's family.

On the wedding day, Steve and Randi arrive at the altar and proceed with their vows. Randi says 'I do' and when it comes to Steve's turn, he acts emotional and eventually announces that the whole wedding was a setup. At the same time it is revealed that Steve is in fact actor Steven W. Bailey, and his "family" were also all professional actors – something that even Randi did not know. When Steve reveals that "it's fake" and that he is an actor, Randi begins crying.

Because nobody caught on to the entire scheme, and because Randi was unaware that Steve was part of the scam, she and her family were presented with double the amount of money that Randi had expected – $500,000 for herself and $500,000 for her family.

== Production ==
The series' concept was conceived by Mike Darnell, the executive vice president of alternative programming for Fox.

== Episodes ==
No.	Title	Original release date	US viewers (millions)
1	"Episode 1"	January 19, 2004	19.6
Randi is told the rules of the game. She will have to convince her family that she is in love and that she will be getting married in 12 days. She meets her fiancé Steve, who is, of course, the big fat obnoxious fiancé of the show's title. What she does not know is that in reality, Steve is not only already married himself but also an actor, real name Steven W. Bailey, who has been paid to be as annoying as possible. Steve and Randi eat breakfast and go to a spa. The wedding invitations are mailed.
2	"Episode 2"	January 26, 2004	13.4
Steve and Randi visit a wedding planner and try on tuxedos and wedding dresses. Steve pretends to get emotional when he and Randi dance. The next day Randi gives Steve a list of things he needs to change, and they visit a sex therapist. Randi's best friend, Anna, visits the estate and Randi tells her that she has gotten engaged.
3	"Episode 3"	February 2, 2004	16.2
Anna meets Steve, Randi tries to do yoga with Steve, and Steve gets a makeover. Steve introduces Randi to his "family," all of whose members are, like himself, played by actors, and announces that they are engaged. Randi calls her family and gets them to agree to come and meet Steve.
4	"Episode 4"	February 9, 2004	13.8
The Coys arrive. Steve and Randi go to meet them, and Steve has a panic attack. Steve and the Coy family go on a short cruise where Steve acts like an intelligent, suave gentleman. The next day Steve is back to his normal obnoxious self. He and the Coys play croquet. They all eat outside and Randi tells them she and Steve are engaged. That night the Coys and the Williams meet each other at a luau. The Williams belch loudly, and the Coys make their dislike for them evident. Randi and Steve make a toast and announce that they are getting married in 3 days.
5	"Episode 5"	February 16, 2004	16.1
The family is shocked by the news of the wedding in 3 days. The next day Randi talks to her parents and they agree to come to the wedding. Though Bobby makes it clear that he does not like it, he agrees that he will attend. Patrick, however, refuses to be a part of it. The day before the wedding itself, Steve, Bruce, Jimmy, and Richard are fitted for tuxedos while Randi, Laura, Anna, and Catherine meet with the wedding planner, Jill. That night they have the wedding rehearsal and Jimmy makes a speech. Catherine goes to Melanie and Patrick and insists that they be part of the wedding.
6	"Episode 6"	February 23, 2004	21.0
On the day of the wedding itself, it is raining. The Coy family is getting ready for the ceremony and Melanie is very upset with Randi. People start to arrive for the wedding. The ceremony starts. Patrick and Bobby wear kilts because of the Coys's Irish heritage. All of Randi's family comes, and no one objects. When the time comes for Steve to say "I do" he says that he cannot, and tells everyone that it is not a real wedding. The Coys, except Bruce, storm off into the house. A producer gets them to come back. Steve explains to everyone what the show is really about, then reveals that he and his "family" are actually actors. He gives a speech about the Coys's love for each other and gives them checks: $500,000 for Randi, and $500,000 for the rest of her family. Randi's family forgives her, and they watch a clip from when Randi first met Steve.

== Reception ==
Laura Fries of Variety claimed the show's premise was contrived.

Coy's employer, Pope John XXIII Catholic School Community, claimed the series went against its mission statement. The school sent the parents of Coy's students a warning letter about the series, with Principal Phil Langley stating that "[Coy] can’t be teaching and do a show like that".

=== Ratings ===
My Big Fat Obnoxious Fiance was scheduled to premiere on January 19, 2004, as a lead-out to the season three premiere of American Idol. The series premiered to over 21 million viewers and averaged a 9.9 rating in the 18 to 49 group.

== Adaptations ==
The first country to adapt the format was Russia. The show Мой толстый противный жених was first aired on DTV-Viasat in October 9, 2004 and lasted for one season.

The German broadcaster Sat. 1 adopted the format and aired Mein großer, dicker, peinlicher Verlobter in late 2004.

In France Mon incroyable fiancé was aired on TF1 in summer 2005 and Mon incroyable fiancé 2 in summer 2009. In the second season, Christopher, a heterosexual, had to convince his family that he turned homosexual and wanted to marry his newly found boyfriend in Spain. As with the American version, the participant is unaware their fiance is an actor. A third season has started airing on October 17, 2014.

In the Netherlands Mijn vieze, vette, vervelende verloofde ("My dirty, fat, annoying fiancé") aired in September/October 2012.

My Big Fat Obnoxious Fiance inspired the NBC reality television series $25 Million Dollar Hoax.

== Lawsuit ==
On August 23, 2005, My Big Fat Obnoxious Fiance was one of several television programs cited in a class-action lawsuit filed by the Writers Guild of America. The suit was filed in the Los Angeles County Superior Court and targeted the series' production company, Rocket Science Laboratories, and the series' network, Fox.
