= Baby mama =

Woman who is not married to her child's father

A baby mama (or baby momma, also baby mother) is a slang term for a mother who is not married to her child's father, although the term often carries other connotations as well. This term is associated with African Americans, originally coming from Jamaican Creole and finding its way into hip-hop music.

The equivalent term for a male is baby daddy (or baby father), but it is not used as frequently.

== Origin ==
The term originated in Jamaican Creole as "baby-mother" (pronounced [ˈbebi ˈmada]), with the first printed usage appearing in the Kingston newspaper, The Daily Gleaner in 1966. Another Daily Gleaner use dates from November 21, 1989. Originally, the term was used by the fathers of illegitimate children to describe the mothers of their children.

The term is now in general use to describe any single mother. Peter L. Patrick, a linguistics professor who studies Jamaican English, has said (of the terms baby mother and baby father), "[they] definitely imply there is not a marriage—not even a common-law marriage, but rather that the child is an 'outside' child". Since entering currency in U.S. tabloids, the terms have even begun to be applied to married and engaged celebrities.

Linguist John McWhorter states "baby mama" is typical Black English, removing the "'s" possessive marker.

== Usage ==
The term originated from the stereotype that black men are irresponsible deadbeat fathers and that black women are welfare queens. However, the term has been used by white women on social media such as Kylie Jenner, who has two children with her former boyfriend, African-American rapper Travis Scott.

Iggy Azalea, an Australian white female rapper, gained significant media attention after having a child out of wedlock with Playboi Carti. She alleged that Playboi Carti did not spend Christmas with their child and accused him of infidelity with a Cuban model from Atlanta named Brandi Marion.

=== In music ===
Baby mother and baby mama had entered widespread use in American hip-hop lyrics by the mid-1990s. One of the first representations of baby mamas in hip-hop lyrics was by southern rapper Krazy, from Tampa, Florida. One of his songs was titled "I Hate My Baby Mama." The Outkast song "Ms. Jackson", released in 2000, was dedicated to "all the baby mamas' mamas". American Idol winner Fantasia Barrino released a song entitled "Baby Mama" in 2004. In this song she is writing an ode to single mothers and how to be a baby mama should be a "badge of honor". She makes firsthand acknowledgements as a single mother and empathizes on the thoughts of baby mamas and how they are "fed up with makin' beds up." Planet Earth, an album by Prince released in 2007, features a song called "Future Baby Mama". Three 6 Mafia had a song called "Baby Mama" on Choices: The Album. Tupac's "Dear Mama", and "Brenda's got a Baby" are two hip hop songs that show a strong Black woman/mothering trope.

=== In television ===
All My Babies' Mamas was an unaired reality show starring rapper Shawty Lo, showcasing his lifestyle as the father of 11 children, mothered by 10 different women. The show was cancelled due to it stereotyping black families and polygamy. A sitcom titled Baby Daddy premiered in 2012.

=== In film ===
In 2008, Universal Pictures released a comedy film entitled Baby Mama starring Tina Fey and Amy Poehler, in which Poehler plays a woman Fey hires to be her surrogate.

In many films, including some like Tyler Perry's Meet the Browns, that was released in 2008, there are many stereotypical representations of black baby mamas. Brenda, who is played by Angela Bassett, is one of the main characters in the film that is portrayed as a stereotypical Black single mother who is caught in an endless cycle of poverty and struggle. She has three children from three different men, none of which have a presence in their child's life. Throughout the film there is no indication that Brenda is on welfare but nevertheless, she is a clear representation of a contemporary "baby mama". In stereotypical fashion, her character is powerless.

== See also ==
- Legitimacy (family law)
- Unintended pregnancy
- Single parent
- African-American family structure
