= Trading Spouses =

2004 reality television series

- Genre: Reality television
- Country of origin: United States
- Original language: English
- No. of seasons: 3
- No. of episodes: 59

Production
- Executive producers: Jean-Michel Michenaud; Chris Cowan
- Running time: 60 minutes
- Production company: Rocket Science Laboratories

Original release
- Network: Fox
- Release: July 20, 2004 – May 4, 2007

Trading Spouses: Meet Your New Mommy is an American reality television series broadcast by the Fox Broadcasting Company (Fox). The series ran for three seasons from July 20, 2004, to May 5, 2007. Each episode of Trading Spouses followed two families, often of different cultural or social backgrounds, who swapped mothers or fathers for a week. Both families were awarded $50,000, with the stipulation that the guest mother decides how her host family must spend the money.

The show shares a very similar format to Wife Swap (and its American remake). In 2004, ABC showcased their upcoming Wife Swap show including projections of its popularity. Weeks before the show's debut, Fox introduced Trading Spouses: Meet Your New Mommy. The producers of Wife Swap, RDF Media, claimed Fox stole their concept.

The show completed airing its third season on May 3, 2007. On February 27, 2008, Fox announced that it had sold the rights to Trading Spouses: Meet Your New Mommy to CMT, effectively ending the series.

In 2005, Trading Spouses was one of several television programs cited in a class-action lawsuit filed by the Writers Guild of America concerning labor law violations.

== Reception ==
Brian Lowry of Variety criticized the series, stating, "Trading Spouses is as cynical as its name — designed to stoke conflict and elicit well-orchestrated feelings of contempt or bemusement toward the key 'characters.'"

== Lawsuit ==
On December 15, 2004, Fox and Rocket Science Laboratories were sued by RDF Media over allegations that Trading Spouses copied Wife Swap.

== D'Amico-Flisher/Perrin and Malone-Brown/Perrin ==
In November 2005, a two-part episode entitled D'Amico-Flisher/Perrin aired. In the episode, a Christian woman from Louisiana named Marguerite Perrin was staying with the New Age D'Amico-Flisher family in Massachusetts while hypnotherapist and radio talk-show host, Jeanne Marie D'Amico stayed with Perrin's family. Throughout the episode, Perrin became increasingly angry with the beliefs of the D'Amico-Flisher family due to viewing their beliefs as Satanic. Upon returning home, Perrin had an emotional outburst due to her discomfort felt during her experience. The episode went viral and Perrin earned the nickname the "God Warrior" due to her calling herself this during her outburst. Due to her fame from her outburst, she made guest appearances on The Jay Leno Show and The Tyra Banks Show. During her appearance on The Jay Leno Show, Perrin was gifted a bobblehead in her likeness. Due to her fame, she returned to the show where she stayed in Florida with black activist family, the Malone-Browns. Throughout the episode, Perrin quarreled with the patriarch, Abasi Malone, on topics of race, politics, and social injustice.
