= All My Babies' Mamas =

2013 reality television special

- Genre: Reality television
- Country of origin: United States
- Original language: English

Production
- Executive producers: Liz Gateley; Tony DiSanto
- Running time: 1 hour
- Production company: DiGa Vision

Original release
- Network: Oxygen
- Release: 2013

All My Babies' Mamas is an unaired American reality television special planned for broadcast by Oxygen. A one-hour special was set to premiere in the spring of 2013, although the special was shelved less than a month after its announcement. The special starred rapper Shawty Lo, in which he showcased his lifestyle as the father of 11 children fathered by 10 different women.

The special garnered considerable coverage due to its allegedly stereotypical portrayal of black families and glamorizing of premarital sex and sex with multiple partners. All My Babies' Mamas was cancelled on January 15, 2013, without airing a single episode.

== Announcement and reception ==
On December 26, 2012, Oxygen sent out a press release for All My Babies' Mamas. Set to air in spring 2013, the release described the special as "an intimate look at unconventional families with larger than life personalities". The release also specified that the special would contain "outrageous and authentic over-the-top moments" that a "young, diverse female audience can tweet and gossip about."

News of the show's central premise received a mostly negative reaction from critics. A petition sprung up online to cancel the show, while some news commentators, and the conservative advocacy group Parents Television Council in conjunction with author Sabrina Lamb, panned the show for perpetuating or glorifying negative stereotypes.

=== Oxygen's response ===
Oxygen network executives distanced themselves from the show, and they canceled it before it aired.

== See also ==
- Baby mama
- List of television series canceled before airing an episode
