= Jill Nicolini =

American reporter and actress (born 1978)

- Born: Jill Marie Nicolini; January 10, 1978 (age 48); Farmingville, New York, U.S.
- Occupations: New York television reporter, former reality TV participant, former model

Jill Marie Nicolini (born January 10, 1978) is a reporter and former model, actress, and reality TV show participant. Formerly, Nicolini was a traffic reporter on WPIX 11 Morning News in New York City.

== Life and career ==
Nicolini was born in Farmingville, New York. She graduated from Sachem North High School in 1996 and attended Stony Brook University for one year. In 1997, Nicolini joined WBLI Radio on Long Island. In 2000, she began working on her bachelor's degree in Communication Arts at the New York Institute of Technology while reporting for LI News Tonight. In 2001, she became the arena announcer for the New York Islanders and a dancer for the New York Dragons arena football team. Nicolini soon became an on-camera traffic reporter at Long Island's Metro & Traffic and Weather Channel and News 12/Long Island. In 2002, she was crowned Miss Long Island but was stripped of her title on her way to entering Miss New York because of news that she posed nude for Playboy in 2001 when its "College Girls" Special Edition had surfaced.

Nicolini participated in the 2003 Fox reality television program Married by America; she won the show but did not marry. In August 2006, in a morning news segment on WPIX-TV, Nicolini participated in the tryouts to become a Pussycat Doll.

Before becoming a reporter, Nicolini made her living as a model. She tried out unsuccessfully to become the official live-action model for Vampirella in 2001. She had bit parts in four feature films and six TV shows, including HBO's Sex and the City and NBC's Law & Order.

From 2004-2011, Nicolini was at WPIX as the weekday morning traffic reporter.

Nicolini joined WNYW Fox 5 in 2011 as Entertainment Reporter. Previously, she was the Traffic/Entertainment Anchor on the PIX11 Morning News since 2004. In addition to delivering the traffic (often from the helicopter Air 11), Nicolini interviewed top celebrities in the entertainment industry. She also served as a fill-in anchor, weather anchor and feature reporter.

At WPIX, she and Marvin Scott spent Christmas holidays in Iraq in 2009 and 2010 with local servicepersons to help reconnect the troops with their families back at home live via satellite. In continuing her goodwill mission, in 2010 she spent the holidays in Norfolk, Virginia with the Navy where she reported live and reunited sailors with their loved ones. She is actively involved with several charities, including John Theissen Children's Foundation, Little Shelter Animal Rescue, Alliance for Lupus Research, PETA, The Juvenile Diabetes Foundation, The National Institute of Natural Sciences, and The Arthritis Foundation.

In October 2013, Nicolini served as a traffic reporter and fill-in host on Live From The Couch on WLNY-TV. This was followed by a stint as a traffic reporter for CBS 2 News This Morning on WCBS-TV.

In October 2014, Nicolini announced that she was pregnant with a baby boy.

In Spring 2017, Nicolini returned to WPIX, this time again, doing traffic for the station's weekday morning newscast.

As of October 2017, Jill can be heard reporting traffic on 1010AM WINS Radio.

She formerly dated Anthony Cumia of the Opie and Anthony Show. The couple ended their relationship in September 2008.

== Filmography ==
Year	Film	Role	Notes
2000	Sex and the City	Nude Waitress	Episode: "Boy, Girl, Boy, Girl..."
2003	Freddy Monday: I Want To Be Your Davy Jones	Girl	
2003	Married by America	Herself	
2005	Survive This	Herself	
2009	Breaking Point	Veronica Taylor	
2012	Freddy Monday: I Want To Be Your Davy Jones Outtakes Reel	Girl	
2014	Annie	Ms. Giannetti	
2014	The Perfect Murder	Herself	Episode: "Gone Girl"
2021	Clifford the Big Red Dog	Interviewer	
