= Carpe Noctem (Angel) =

- Angel episode
- Episode no.: Season 3 Episode 4
- Directed by: James A. Contner
- Written by: Scott Murphy
- Production code: 3ADH04
- Original air date: October 15, 2001

Guest appearances
- Stephanie Romanov as Lilah Morgan; Daniel Dae Kim as Gavin Park; Rance Howard as Marcus Roscoe; Paul Benjamin as Fellow Resident; Misty Louwagie as Christina; Marc Brett as Health Club Phil; Paul Logan as Woody; Lauren Reina as Escort #1; Magdalena Zeilinska as Escort #2; Steven W. Bailey as Ryan

Episode chronology
← Previous "That Old Gang of Mine"	Next → "Fredless"
- Angel season 3

"Carpe Noctem" is the 4th episode of the third season of the American television series Angel. It was directed by James A. Contner and written by Scott Murphy, and first aired on October 15, 2001, on The WB Television Network.

The episode centers on a body-swap plot in which an elderly man named Marcus uses a spell to exchange bodies with Angel, intending to exploit Angel's vampiric immortality. The story also advances a subplot involving Lilah and Gavin's rivalry at Wolfram & Hart, and resolves a developing romantic tension between Fred and Angel. The episode ends with the team receiving news that Buffy has been revived. Critical reception was mixed, with reviewers finding the episode entertaining but largely a missed opportunity.

== Plot ==
Fred shares her admiration for Angel in front of the rest of the team... as she theorizes what he is reading upstairs. Angel comes down from his room with a newspaper and invites everyone to a Charlton Heston double feature, which only Fred is delighted to accept. The next evening, Fred gushes about her date to Wesley and Cordelia. Concerned, Cordelia instructs Angel to have a talk with besotted Fred, which Angel avoids by bringing up a string of deaths in hotels which involved melted bodies and insists he needs to investigate right away.

The team find out that the men killed were all members of the same gym. Angel and Cordelia arrive there and Cordelia promptly interviews the muscled men and questions them - for their phone numbers. Angel notices a retirement home across the street where an old man is seen peering at them with binoculars. He leaves Cordelia and confronts the old man, Marcus, who recites a spell that switches their bodies.

While Marcus enjoys himself in Angel's vampiric body, Angel tries to leave the retirement home in Marcus's elderly body to warn the gang of the impostor in their midst. Meanwhile, Lilah continues to clash with her co-worker Gavin over their tactics to take down Angel and his group. She goes to the hotel to bring Angel documents that would foil Gavin's attempt to evacuate the hotel since it wasn't "up to code" to one-up him. Marcus tells her she is a very beautiful woman and they start kissing each other furiously. Fred, who was given the same line by Marcus earlier and instructed her to wear something pretty to go out, sees them and runs away in tears. Marcus vamps out in his passion and bites Lilah, who is furious with him for playing games and runs out.

Marcus tries to find out what happened and is shocked to find he doesn't have a reflection. He spends the night shredding contents of files related to his murders and goes through books researching vampires, realizing this body will never give out on him and planning to kill Angel in his old one.

Cordelia finds Fred sobbing in the elevator and finds out about Marcus’ actions. Wesley finds the office littered with the books and correctly theorizes that Angel's body has been taken over. He, Gunn, Cordelia, and Fred rescue Angel from being killed and, he is returned to his own form. Marcus angrily tells him he wastes his life instead of taking advantage of what he has. Angel tells him his heart is weak because he doesn't use it. An upset Marcus has an onset of a fifth heart attack as Angel and his team walk out together.

Back at the Hyperion, Angel finally sits down with Fred for the long-overdue talk, however she stops him, as Cordelia has already explained to her about Angel's curse as well as his having no romantic feelings for her. As Fred notes that Angel will probably be better off without love in his life, Willow calls the hotel to tell the group that Buffy has been revived, five months after her death.

== Critical reception ==
Noel Murray of The A.V. Club wrote his opinion that it "was entertaining in spots but largely struck me as a missed opportunity — one that was over before it really began. The main purpose of the episode seemed to be to defuse any growing romantic feelings Fred might have for Angel, by letting her see why Angel's not the relationship type." Ryan Bovay of Critically Touched likewise gave it a lukewarm review: an episode with "some fun qualities but not a great deal to talk about," succeeding "where it does because of the considerable talents of the main cast, who really know how to live their characters in each of their own subtle, loving ways" though with "sub-par writing" to make "the episode watch-able and even enjoyable."
