= Must Love Kids =

2008 reality television series

- Genre: Reality television
- Country of origin: United States
- Original language: English
- No. of seasons: 1
- No. of episodes: 10

Production
- Executive producers: Jean-Michel Michenaud; Chris Cowan
- Running time: 1 hour
- Production company: Rocket Science Laboratories

Original release
- Network: TLC
- Release: July 15 – September 20, 2008

Must Love Kids is a reality dating show that debuted on TLC in the United States on July 15, 2008. The series followed three single moms as they entered the world of dating. The moms had to balance their careers and raise their children while trying to find a lifelong partner. Must Love Kids was based on the Swedish format Single Moms first aired on TV3 in Sweden in 2007. The format was developed by Friday TV.

== Cast ==
Kristin S. Eaton	10 episodes
Mark Harp	10 episodes
Paul Kitchen	10 episodes
Lucas Himebaugh	10 episodes
Tracy J. Paye	10 episodes
Vanessa Raming	10 episodes
Christopher Wilson	10 episodes
David M. Silver	7 episodes
James J. Gotshaw	2 episodes
Eric Hanson	2 episodes
Phillip R. Price	2 episodes
Gary Rotto	1 episode

== Critical reception ==
Ginia Bellafante of The New York Times believed the series was inoffensive.

== International versions ==
Country	Title	Network	First Aired
Sweden	Ensam mamma söker	TV3	2007
Finland	Sinkkuäidille sulhanen	Nelonen	2007
Netherlands	Alleen nog een man	Net 5	2008
Denmark	En mand til mor	TV3	2008
Norway	Mamma søker kjæreste	TV3	2008
Poland	Mamy Mamy	TVP1	2008
France	Maman cherche l’amour	M6	2008
Germany	Papa gesucht	RTL	2009
Romania	Mame Singure	Kanal D	2008

== Production ==
Must Love Kids was produced by the production company Rocket Science Laboratories, also responsible for the Fox series Joe Millionaire. The format Single Moms is distributed by Shine International, the international distribution arm of the Shine Group.

== See also ==
- List of reality television show franchises
- List of television show franchises
