= Steven W. Bailey =

American actor (born 1971)

- Born: July 1, 1971 (age 54); San Diego, California, U.S.
- Other name: Steve Bailey
- Years active: 1995–present
- Spouse: Anneliese Boies (m. 2002; div. 2012)

Steven W. Bailey (born July 1, 1971) is an American actor.

Bailey is best known for taking on the character of Steve Williams in the TV show My Big Fat Obnoxious Fiance in 2004, and for playing the recurring character of Joe, a bartender who owns a bar only referred to as "Joe's", on the American television medical drama Grey's Anatomy. He has also had guest spots on Buffy the Vampire Slayer (for three episodes in 2002), Angel (in the 2001 episode 'Carpe Noctem'), NCIS, Private Practice, Bunheads and others. He has also been seen in a number of commercials.

Bailey grew up in Edmonds, Washington and became active in the drama department of Meadowdale High School in Lynnwood, Washington. He graduated from high school in 1989 and trained with the Advanced Training Program at the American Conservatory Theater in San Francisco, California. He returned to the Seattle area and joined the Driftwood Players and Village Theatre while appearing in national commercials and small roles in televised series.

Bailey married Anneliese Boies on June 1, 2002. The couple divorced in 2012. In January 2026, Bailey announced he had been diagnosed with congenital myasthenic syndrome five years prior, and that the disease was making him more reliant on using a wheelchair.
