= Mental Samurai =

American television game show (2019–2021)

- Genre: Game show
- Created by: Arthur Smith; Mike Darnell
- Directed by: Rich DiPirro
- Presented by: Rob Lowe
- Country of origin: United States
- Original language: English
- No. of seasons: 2
- No. of episodes: 19

Production
- Executive producers: Arthur Smith; Mike Darnell; Toby Gorman; Brooke Karzen; Jeff Apploff; Noah Bonnett
- Producer: Rob Lowe
- Production locations: Burbank, California (2019); Lisbon, Portugal (2021)
- Running time: 44 minutes
- Production companies: A. Smith & Co. Productions; Apploff Entertainment; Warner Horizon Unscripted Television (Note: Credited as Warner Horizon Television until 2020)

Original release
- Network: Fox
- Release: March 19, 2019 – July 20, 2021

Mental Samurai is an American television game show that aired from March 19, 2019, to July 20, 2021, on Fox. Described as an "obstacle course for the mind", the show features contestants answering knowledge-based questions while being moved around by a large robot arm in the show's specially designed capsule that can rotate 360°. The show is hosted and produced by Rob Lowe.

On February 25, 2020, it was announced that the second season was set to premiere on April 22, 2020. However, due to the ongoing COVID-19 pandemic, the second season was postponed to May 25, 2021, and reruns of the first season aired in its place.

On May 16, 2022, Fox shelved the series indefinitely.

== Gameplay ==
The core gameplay is divided into two rounds: Towers of Samurai and Circle of Samurai. Contestants are tasked with qualifying through the Towers of Samurai round to play the Circle of Samurai round. Any incorrect answer during either will end the round immediately.

=== Towers of Samurai (Season 1) ===
The game consists of two rounds, with one contestant at a time answering questions from within a movable capsule, named Ava. The questions are asked on four screens ("towers"), each focusing on a different skill: Knowledge, Puzzles, Sequences, and Memory. If the contestant answers any question wrong in the first round or runs out of time, he/she is eliminated. If the contestant answers all of the questions correctly, he/she will win $10,000 and advances to the next round for a chance to win a top prize of $100,000. The questions start easy and progressively get harder.

=== Towers of Samurai (Season 2) ===
In season 2, there have been several changes to how Mental Samurai is played.

Instead of contestants answering 12 questions correctly to move on, the format has changed to a head-to-head battle where contestants have a five-minute time limit to try to answer the most questions in the fastest time or to answer all 10.

Contestants are not eliminated immediately for answering a question incorrectly. Instead, the first contestant who manages to answer at least 1 question correctly becomes the "Reigning Samurai" and sets the pace/score for the next contestants to beat. If any of the remaining contestants, including the previous week's winner, manage to beat the Reigning Samurai's time or answer more questions than the previous contestant, then they become the new Reigning Samurai. After all of the contestants have had their chance, the Reigning Samurai moves on to the Circle of Samurai for a chance at $100,000.

For every question a contestant answers correctly, they earn $500. If a contestant answers all 10 questions correctly, their prize money will be doubled to $10,000. Regardless of who moves on to the next round, each contestant keeps the money they earned.

=== Circle of Samurai (Season 1) ===
This round consists of up to four questions, one at each tower, in the same manner; 90 seconds are allowed, plus any time remaining from the first round (rounded to the nearest second). The first correct answer augments the contestant's winnings to $25,000, and each subsequent answer adds a further $25,000, for a maximum of $100,000 if the contestant answers all four questions correctly. A miss at any time ends the round, but the contestant leaves with whatever money they have won to that point.

Correct questions	Prize
0	$10,000
1	$25,000
2	$50,000
3	$75,000
4	$100,000

=== Circle of Samurai (Season 2) ===
The game is played similar to Season 1, except that contestants are tasked with answering ten questions (at random from all four towers) for $2,500 each. If a contestant answers all ten questions correctly, their winnings in the round will be quadrupled to $100,000. An incorrect answer will end the round but the contestant will receive all money won to that point. Additionally, the contestant will return the following episode (whether they answered all ten or not), to face the Reigning Samurai of that week's episode for a chance to return to the Circle of Samurai again. The questions are tougher but the mini-games remain the same. The reward is greater, and the contestants only have four minutes to answer all questions.

=== Towers of Samurai Mini-Games ===
The exact order or designation of the Towers of Samurai is randomly drawn. In the "Towers of Samurai" and the second season "Circle of Samurai" round, it is expected that players will visit each "Tower" at least once but some towers may repeat. In the "Circle of Samurai" from season 1, the contestant will play one question at each tower.

The difficulty of the question depends on how many questions they have answered during the current game. The closer they are to winning, the harder the questions.

==== The Tower of Knowledge ====
- Factfinder: The contestant must answer a multiple choice question with 3 options.
- Initial Impression: The contestant must combine two people to make a phrase.
- Reality Check: The contestant must figure out which image is real and which is fake.
- Snapshot: The contestant must figure out a phrase, person, or object by combining two/three images.
- Special Equation: The contestant must count the number of two things together to make an equation and say the answer.
- Spellbound: The contestant must spell the correct answer to the question.
- Toss Up: The contestant must answer a common knowledge question.
- True Lies: The contestant must answer a True/False question correctly.

==== The Tower of Puzzles ====
- Compound Fracture: The contestant must identify the word that completes two compound words.
- Double Crossed: The contestant must complete a crossword puzzle to identify a common name, item, or phrase.
- Gridlock: The contestant must identify the three words required to answer the question in a word search.
- Match Box: The contestant must identify how many matching pairs are in a pool of twelve images.
- Mirror Mirror: The contestant must identify the mirror image of the image above when presented with three options.
- Missing Piece: The contestant must complete a puzzle by locating the missing piece that fits.
- Oddball: The contestant must identify the image that's not identical to the others.
- Picture Perfect: The contestant must identify a common phrase based on an image that they see.
- Wordnado: The contestant must combine letter fragments to make a word.
- Wordplay: The contestant must unscramble a set of letters to make a common name.

==== The Tower of Sequence ====
- Alpha Order: The contestant must list the names of people/things in alphabetical order from first to last, or vice versa.
- Alpha Order Double Video: The same as Alpha Order, but the listed people/things will be abbreviated and the contestant must figure out the abbreviations and list accordingly.
- Back Order: The contestant must list the words in the order in which they appear in their message.
- Measure Up: The contestant must measure three measurements shown from shortest to longest, or vice versa.
- Record-Breaker: The contestant must sort the list of items by age.
- Striking Distance: The contestant must arrange the places in a certain direction or by distance.
- Time Warp: The contestant must chronologically arrange a list of items.

==== The Tower of Memory ====
- Blackout: The contestant must study a clip or image carefully and answer a question about it.
- Chat Attack: The contestant must study a text message and answer a question about it.
- Echo Chamber: The contestant must listen to Ava repeat a pattern in a series of images.
- Hear Say: The contestant must listen to a series of sounds and answer a question about them.
- Mind Field: The contestant must remember the location of six images and locate the one asked for by its number.
- Name Dropper: The contestant must memorize the names featured in an image and identify the name of the person shown.
- Pay Attention: The contestant must listen to an audio message and answer a question about it.

== Tournament format (Season 1) ==
The best-performing contestants in the first season, including some who fail to win the $100,000 on their original episode, returned in the final episode of the season to compete in a tournament for a grand prize of $250,000 and the title "Mental Samurai". Ranking for the tournament is determined by how many questions a contestant got correct in the shortest amount of time.

=== Towers of Samurai Final ===
In the tournament final, much like the preliminary episodes, the finalists will complete a Towers of Samurai round. However, unlike in previous shows, the finalists will each face the same 12 questions in the same order. (All contestants are sequestered away and are not aware of the proceedings until it is their turn to play.) The top three finishing players (determined by most questions answered correctly and ties broken by fastest time) will advance to the Circle of Samurai final.

=== Circle of Samurai Final ===
The top three players from the Towers of Samurai Final will play in the Circle of Samurai final. Each of the contestants qualifying for the Circle of Samurai will face off by answering the same set of questions (in the same order). Again, each contestant is sequestered backstage and unaware of the proceedings. Unlike the regular episodes, each contestant is only given 90 seconds to complete the four questions (regardless of how much time was left in the Towers of Samurai). The contestant who answers the most questions correctly, in the shortest amount of time, will be deemed the champion and wins the $250,000 prize.

== Ratings ==
=== Season 1 ===
#	Air Date	Rating/share (18-49)	Viewers (millions)	DVR (18-49)	DVR viewers (millions)	Total (18-49)	Total viewers (millions)	Source
1	March 19, 2019	0.7/3	2.20	0.1	0.55	0.8	2.75	
2	March 26, 2019	0.6/3	1.98	0.1	0.34	0.7	2.32	
3	April 2, 2019	0.6/3	1.85	0.1	0.31	0.7	2.15	
4	April 9, 2019	0.5/3	1.84	0.1	0.31	0.6	2.15	
5	April 16, 2019	0.5/2	1.68	0.1	0.31	0.6	1.98	
6	April 23, 2019	0.5/3	1.77	0.1	0.26	0.6	2.04	
7	April 30, 2019	0.6/3	1.75	0.1	0.26	0.6	2.01	
8	May 7, 2019	0.5/2	1.66	0.0	0.26	0.5	1.91	
9	May 14, 2019	0.4/2	1.39	0.0	0.25	0.4	1.64	
10	May 21, 2019	0.4/2	1.58	0.1	0.23	0.5	1.81	

=== Season 2 ===
#	Air Date	Rating/share (18-49)	Viewers (millions)	DVR (18-49)	DVR viewers (millions)	Total (18-49)	Total viewers (millions)	Source
1	May 25, 2021	0.2/2	1.17	0.1	0.33	0.3	1.50	
2	June 1, 2021	0.3/2	1.13	0.1	0.37	0.4	1.49	
3	June 8, 2021	0.3/2	1.22	0.1	0.33	0.4	1.55	
4	June 15, 2021	0.3/2	1.35	0.1	0.32	0.4	1.67	
5	June 22, 2021	0.3/2	1.12	0.1	0.34	0.4	1.45	
6	June 24, 2021	0.4/3	1.56	0.1	0.30	0.4	1.86	
7	June 29, 2021	0.3/2	1.15	0.1	0.32	0.3	1.46	
8	July 6, 2021	0.3/2	1.05	0.1	0.34	0.3	1.39	
9	July 20, 2021	0.3/2	1.04	0.0	0.26	0.3	1.29	

== International versions ==
Legend:
Currently airing
No longer airing
Upcoming version

Country	Local title	Host	Network	Year(s) aired	Top prize
Arab World	Mental Samurai بالعربي; Mental Samurai Bil Arabi	Ammar Al-Rahma	Dubai TV	March 14 – December 10, 2020	50,000 Dhs
Finland	Mental Samurai Suomi	Ellen Jokikunnas	Nelonen	February 22 – December 6, 2020	€30,000
Portugal	Mental Samurai Portugal	Pedro Teixeira	TVI	October 29, 2019 – March 20, 2021	€50,000
Spain	Mental Masters	Carlos Sobera	Telecinco	March 25 – April 29, 2024	€20,000
