= Judi Shekoni =

British actress

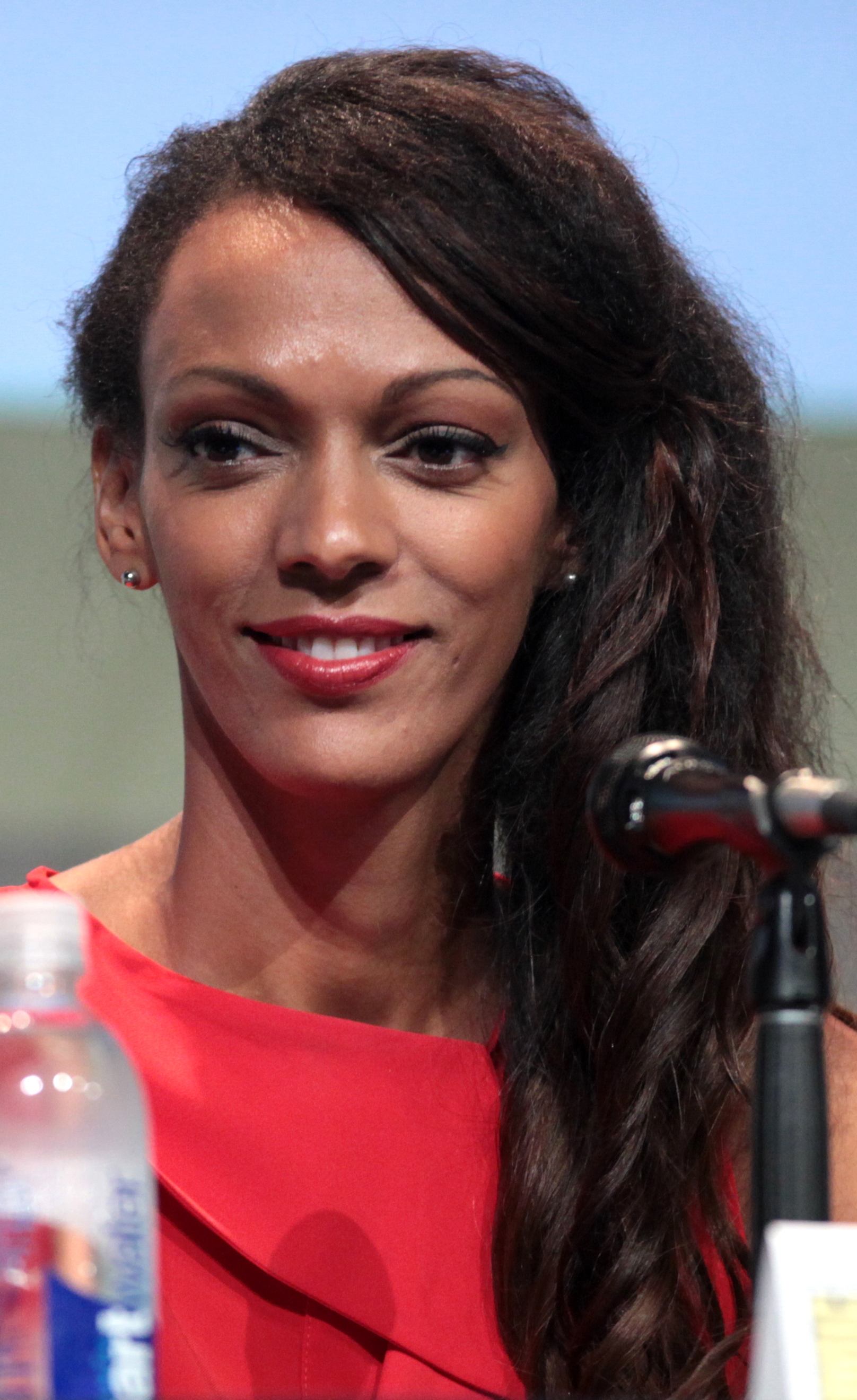
- Shekoni in 2015
- Born: Judith Iyabo Shekoni; Manchester, England
- Occupations: Actress; television personality; businesswoman
- Notable work: Twilight; Heroes Reborn; Ice; Maleficent

Judith Iyabo Shekoni is an English actress, television personality and businesswoman.

== Early life and education ==
Born to a Yoruba Nigerian father and a British mother of English and Spanish descent, Shekoni is from Gorton, Manchester.

== Career ==
Shekoni began her television career with a breakout role as Marjorie "Precious" Hudson (née Hulton) in the BBC1 soap EastEnders. She then moved into film with roles including Garfield 2 for Fox, The Strange Case of Dr. Jekyll and Mr. Hyde as Renee and Ali G Indahouse.

Shekoni lived and studied in Los Angeles for 10 years and appeared on US television shows including NCIS, All of Us and Damages, Fat Friends and The King of Queens.

Whilst in Los Angeles she worked with Bill Condon in the film The Twilight Saga: Breaking Dawn Part 2. She joined the cast as a lead in Heroes Reborn in 2015, the NBC reboot of the original show, where she played Joanne Collins opposite Zachary Levi.

Relocating back to the UK in 2016, Shekoni appeared in the second season of the BBC1 drama Ordinary Lies written by Bafta winning writer Danny Brocklehurst, airing in November 2016. She then filmed two seasons as the female lead opposite Donald Sutherland and Ray Winston for the American cable series Ice, directed by Antoine Fuqua (Training Day, Magnificent Seven) appearing as Lady Rah, the kingpin of LA Diamond Trade.

Remaining in London, she starred as Shrike in Maleficent: Mistress of Evil for Disney, with Angelina Jolie and Michelle Pfieffer.

Shekoni joined the cast of the Apple TV series Foundation as She-Bends-Light in 2023.

== Business interests ==
Shekoni and British model Amanda Van Annan co-founded Extension Evolution, a company supplying hair extensions. Shekoni is also the founder of two other companies, Make It America and Actors Evolution. She is the CEO of Global WPM, Atap Productions and is affiliated with the Helen Bamber Foundation.

== Filmography ==
=== Film ===
Year	Title	Role	Notes
1999	The World Is Not Enough	Girl in casino	uncredited
2000	Spinning Candyfloss	Mel	
2000	Maybe Baby	Ewan's posse	
2000	It Was an Accident	Sara	uncredited
2002	Ali G Indahouse	Jacuzzi girl	
2004	Echoes of War	Fatima	
2005	Private Moments	Serena	
2006	Garfield 2	Tour guide	
2006	The Strange Case of Dr. Jekyll and Mr. Hyde	Renee	
2010	For Christ's Sake	Mia do'em	
2012	The Twilight Saga: Breaking Dawn Part 2	Zafrina	
2015	Club Dancer		
2019	Maleficent: Mistress of Evil	Shrike	

=== Television ===
Year	Title	Role	Notes
1998	Casualty	Mia Campbell	Episode: One from the Heart
2000	Fat Friends	Imogen	
2001	Murphy's Law	Receptionist	
2002	The Hidden City	Claire	
2002	Casualty	Naomi	Episode: In the Heat of the Night
2002	Attachments	Sue	Episode: Fuck Buddy
2002	Time Gentlemen Please	Sister Eliza	Episode: This Vale of Beers
2002	EastEnders	Marjorie "Precious" Hudson (née Hulton)	
2003	The King of Queens	Melanie	Episode: Nocturnal Omission
2005	NCIS	Natalie Vance	Episode: Model Behavior
2005	Love Island	Herself (Contestant)	Reality Series
2006	Damages	Candy	
2006	All of Us	Amanda	Episode: Love Do Cost a Thing and Trojan Condo
2007	Brothers & Sisters	Hostess	Episode: Valentine's Day Massacre
2008	When Women Rule the World	Island host	Never broadcast in America
2015	Backstrom	Lady Mah	Season 1, Episode 6: "Ancient, Chinese, Secret"
2015	Heroes Reborn	Joanne	
2016	NCIS: Los Angeles	Alisa Chambers	Season 7, Episode 21, "Head of the Snake"
2016-2018	Ice	Lady Rah	Main role (20 episodes)
2023	Foundation	She-Bends-Light	Five episodes
