= Rocket Science Laboratories =

American television production company

- Type: Limited liability
- Industry: Television
- Founded: 1998; 28 years ago
- Founders: Jean-Michel Michenaud; Chris Cowan
- Defunct: July 2009; 17 years ago
- Fate: Dissolved
- Headquarters: Santa Monica, California, United States
- Website: rocketsciencelabs.com (archived)

Rocket Science Laboratories was an American television production company, best known for creating reality television titles throughout the 2000s. The company was founded by Jean-Michel Michenaud and Chris Cowan, both former employees of ZMC Productions; the two acquired ownership of ZMC Productions in 1998 and renamed it Rocket Science Laboratories. The company initially produced television documentaries, before shifting its focus to reality television programming with 2000's Surprise Wedding for the Fox Broadcasting Company (Fox). This special resulted in a close working relationship between the companies, in which Rocket Science Laboratories signed an exclusive deal to develop projects for Fox. Rocket Science Laboratories produced several successful titles, including Temptation Island, Joe Millionaire, and My Big Fat Obnoxious Fiance.

== History ==
=== 1997–2003: Formation and breakthrough ===
In 1982, George Zaloom and Les Mayfield formed the production company ZM Productions. In 1997, one year prior to its dissolution, the company formed a television division, ZMC Productions, which was led by Jean-Michel Michenaud and Chris Cowan. This division produced several projects, including Frank Capra's American Dream and the Emmy-winning Images of Life: Photographs That Changed the World. ZMC Productions was meant to cease operation upon completion of its already-underway productions; however, Michenaud and Cowan opted to purchase the ownership interests of the company. In 1998, the duo renamed the company Rocket Science Laboratories. The company's first production was the television documentary film Dial H for Hitchcock: The Genius Behind the Showman, which was broadcast by Encore on August 13, 1999.

While Rocket Science Laboratories continued to produce television documentaries, such as Influences for Bravo, its focus quickly shifted to shockumentaries. These productions included films such as Getting Away with Murder: The JonBenet Ramsey Story, After Diff’rent Strokes: When the Laughter Stopped, and Unauthorized: Brady Bunch, the Final Days, all produced for the Fox Broadcasting Company (Fox). However, in 2000, the company's focus again shifted to the reality television genre; its first venture into the genre was the television special Surprise Wedding. Broadcast on November 2, 2000, by the Fox, the special depicted several men who were publicly faced with an ultimatum by their partners – propose or end the relationship. Following the success of Surprise Wedding, Rocket Science Laboratories produced a sequel, Surprise Wedding II, and the series Temptation Island for Fox.

Temptation Island premiered on January 10, 2001. The series followed several couples who agreed to temporarily live at a resort where the guests tempted them to have an affair. Temptation Island experienced fierce backlash from conservative and Christian groups, in which advertisers faced pressure to boycott the series. Temptation Island, however, was a success for Fox, with its premiere receiving over 16 million viewers.

In July 2001, USA Network announced that they had ordered a thirteen-episode series titled Mystery Mansion to be produced by Rocket Science Laboratories. The series followed a group of 22 strangers who were relocated to a castle, in which they had to determine who among them was the "killer". Mystery Mansion was set to begin filming on October 1, 2001, at Taymouth Castle in Perthshire, however, the series was cancelled over safety concerns following the September 11 attacks. In 2002, Rocket Science Laboratories experienced another cancelled production with the CBS television pilot Culture Shock. On December 17, 2002, two contestants, Jill Mouser and Marcus Russell, sued the production company for allegedly injuring them.

=== 2004–2006: Fox deal and continued litigation ===
In July 2003, Rocket Science Laboratories signed a two-year, seven-figure deal with Fox. The company's first project under this deal was My Big Fat Obnoxious Fiance; the six-episode series followed an elementary teacher who was required to convince her family that she was engaged to an ill-mannered man. The series was a ratings success, in which its premiere drew in 24.8 million viewers.

Rocket Science Laboratories produced the television special Seriously, Dude, I'm Gay, which was intended to air on June 7, 2004. The special depicted two straight men in competition over who could pass themselves off as a more convincing gay man. However, Fox cancelled the special eleven days before its broadcast due to heavy backlash from the media monitoring organization GLAAD.

Following this cancellation, Rocket Science Laboratories began production on The Partner, a ten-episode series following two teams of attorneys—some of whom were Ivy League graduates while others were from less prestigious schools—competing in a series of mock trials. The series, which was set to air on November 7, 2004, was also cancelled; instead, Fox decided to move forward with My Big Fat Obnoxious Boss, a satirical spinoff of The Apprentice.

In 2005, Rocket Science Laboratories was subject to a lawsuit filed by the Writers Guild of America. Known as Shriver v. Rocket Science Laboratories, the suit alleged violations of the California Labor Code and cited the following seven programs: Trading Spouses, Joe Millionaire, My Big Fat Obnoxious Fiance, My Big Fat Obnoxious Boss, Renovate My Family, Seriously, Dude, I'm Gay, and Married by America. In 2009, a settlement was reached between the two parties for $2.57 million, although Rocket Science Laboratories continued to deny all liability.

=== 2007–2009: Final productions and dissolution ===
Following the end of Rocket Science Laboratories' production deal with Fox, the production company signed a first-look deal with Yahoo! Mike Wood, director of business development at Rocket Science Laboratories, believed the deal was an opportunity "to translate the Rocket Science strength in storytelling to find new programming for the Web."

The company's final project was When Women Rule the World, a reality television competition where a group of twelve chauvinistic men were required to be subservient to a group of ten strong-minded women. When Women Rule the World was announced for the 2007–08 television season; however, after a series of delays, it was shelved by Fox. The series was ultimately broadcast in Belgium and Finland on RTL Plug and MTV3, respectively.

In 2009, Michenaud and Cowan dissolved Rocket Science Laboratories. According to The Hollywood Reporter, the company was dissolved due to mounting debt and liabilities. Following the dissolution of Rocket Science Laboratories, Michenaud and Cowan launched the production company Angel City Factory, a subsidiary of Banijay.

== Production filmography ==
=== Television films ===
Title	Aired	Original network	Notes
Dial H for Hitchcock: The Genius Behind the Showman	1999	Encore	
Influences: From Yesterday to Today	1999	CBS	
Tripping	1999	Channel 4	
Getting Away with Murder: The JonBenet Ramsey Story	2000	Fox	
After Diff’rent Strokes: When the Laughter Stopped	2000	Fox	
Unauthorized: Brady Bunch, the Final Days	2000	Fox	
The 70s: The Decade That Changed Television	2000	ABC	
Unauthorized: The Mary Kay Letourneau Story	2000	Fox	

=== Television series ===
Title	Aired	Original network	Notes
Temptation Island	2001–2003	Fox	
Mystery Mansion	2001	USA	Canceled
Invasion of the Hidden Cameras	2002	Fox	
Joe Millionaire	2003	Fox	
Married by America	2003	Fox	
My Big Fat Obnoxious Fiance	2004	Fox	
Trading Spouses	2004–2007	Fox	
Renovate My Family	2004–2005	Fox	
The Partner	2004	Fox	Canceled
My Big Fat Obnoxious Boss	2004	Fox	
Bullrun	2007–2010	Spike	
Duel	2007–2008	ABC	
Must Love Kids	2008	TLC	
When Women Rule the World	2009	Fox	Aired only in Belgium and Finland

=== Television specials ===
Title	Aired	Original network	Notes
Surprise Wedding	2000	Fox	
Surprise Wedding 2	2001	Fox	
M*A*S*H: 30th Anniversary Reunion	2002	Fox	
Married... with Children Reunion	2003	Fox	
Seriously, Dude, I'm Gay	N/A	Fox	Canceled

=== Television pilots ===
Title	Aired	Original network	Notes
What's Your Life Worth?	2001	Fox	Canceled
Culture Shock	2002	CBS	Canceled
