= Liza and David =

- Genre: Reality television
- Starring: Liza Minnelli; David Gest
- Country of origin: United States
- Original language: English

Original release
- Network: VH1

Liza and David was a reality television series slated to air on VH1 in 2002, featuring Liza Minnelli and her then-husband, David Gest.

The show gained notoriety after arguments between the show's stars and executives from VH1. Ten episodes were planned, but only one was filmed; it never aired, and the whole series was cancelled, with no more episodes being made after that.

Liza is an American singer and dancer. She was born on March 12, 1946, in Los Angeles. Known for her powerful alto singing voice, she won the Academy Award-winning performance in 1972's Cabaret. Liza is the daughter of Hollywood legend Judy Garland and director Vicente Minnelli. Liza has been married for four times but all ended up divorcing, as well as with David.

Gest, who was a film producer spent most of his career behind the scenes. He appeared in Michael Jackson's 30th Anniversary Celebration concert show. The both of them married in 2002, and the television series “Liza and David” was planned for VH1.
