= Seriously, Dude, I'm Gay =

2004 reality television special

- Contestant Larry Anderson (middle) with his three coaches
- Genre: Reality television
- Presented by: Amanda Byram
- Country of origin: United States
- Original language: English

Production
- Executive producers: Chris Cowan; Jean-Michel Michenaud; Ray Giuliani
- Production location: West Hollywood, California
- Running time: 2 hours
- Production company: Rocket Science Laboratories

Seriously, Dude, I'm Gay is an unaired American reality television special planned for broadcast by the Fox Broadcasting Company (Fox). The two-hour special was set to premiere on June 7, 2004, although it was abruptly removed from the Fox schedule only eleven days before its planned broadcast. Filmed in West Hollywood, California, the special depicted two straight men in competition for a $50,000 reward over who could pass themselves off as a more convincing gay man. The contestants were required to move into separate lofts with gay roommates, come out to their best friends, and socialize at gay nightclubs, in addition to competing in a variety of daily challenges. The special was hosted by Irish television presenter Amanda Byram.

Seriously, Dude, I'm Gay was a part of Fox's intent to capitalize on a rising interest in LGBT-themed reality television shows. However, the special was met with fierce criticism from advocacy groups, such as the media monitoring organization GLAAD, who claimed it promoted a negative portrayal of gay men. The special's press release also received backlash, particularly a line that described the special's premise as "a heterosexual male's worst nightmare: turning gay overnight". On May 27, 2004, Fox shelved the special, citing creative reasons. The special's cancellation influenced other television networks to reach out to GLAAD for review of their own LGBT-themed television shows. In 2005, Seriously, Dude, I'm Gay was one of several television programs cited in a class-action lawsuit filed by the Writers Guild of America concerning labor law violations.

== Format ==
Set in West Hollywood, the two-hour special depicted two straight men—a 22-year-old student from Florida and a 28-year-old salesman from Massachusetts—in competition for a reward of $50,000. In order to win the reward, the men were required to pass themselves off as gay for a week and immerse themselves in gay culture. The men were required to move into separate lofts with gay roommates, come out to their best friends, and socialize at gay nightclubs. The contestants also competed in daily challenges; challenges included swimsuit modeling for a group of gay men, confiding in a former teammate that the contestant wrestled due to enjoyment of "close contact with sweaty boys", fork-feeding dinner to a blind date and convincing the date to spank them, making a "gay face", and naming a favorite male pornographic film actor. The contestants were each assigned three coaches (referred to as "mantors") that guided them in experiencing "life as a gay man". At the end of the week, the two men were judged by a diverse panel of gay men who had previously been told that only one of the contestants were actually gay. Whichever contestant the panel chose as the more convincing gay man received the reward. The special was hosted by Irish television presenter Amanda Byram.

== Announcement and reception ==
On May 13, 2004, Fox issued a press release for Seriously, Dude, I'm Gay. Set to air on June 7, 2004, the release described the special's premise as "a heterosexual male's worst nightmare: turning gay overnight". It also specified that the winner of the special would be selected by a "jury of their queers". The release quickly drew criticism from television critics, with The Washington Post's Lisa de Moraes referring to it as homophobic. Production company World of Wonder, which specializes in LGBTQ programming, referred to the special as a "potential problem" that exploits gay men. Four hours after the release was issued, Fox distributed another press release that omitted both of these lines. The network also issued an apology, in which it referred to the content of the initial release as a "failed attempt at humor". The special's announcement followed a rising interest in LGBTQ-themed reality television shows.

I think the show showed that the stereotypes people have aren't true. I realized that there is no way to act gay; you are just your normal self. That definitely came out in the show.

— Contestant Larry Anderson discussing his experience on the special.

The special drew sharp criticism from advocacy groups, including the media monitoring organization GLAAD. Fox provided an advance copy of the special to GLAAD who, upon review, condemned it as "an exercise in systematic humiliation". The organization specifically cited dialogue in which the contestants described their experience on the special as their "worst nightmare" and being "trapped in gay hell". The organization further criticized the special's premise, in which it claimed that the special was offensive and could potentially increase violence against gay people. GLAAD's entertainment media director, Stephen Macias, further claimed that the special embodied "ludicrously sophomoric notions of what it is to be gay". In addition to the special's content, the organization also criticized the language used in its press release, specifically the line that described a panel of gay men as a "jury of their queers".

Several of the special's producers and actors voiced their own criticism toward GLAAD. Executive producer Ray Giuliani and creative consultant Christian McLaughlin claimed that the special was meant to be humorous, with McLaughlin accusing GLAAD of censorship. Giuliani explained that the producers intended for the homophobic contestants to have "walked away learning something about what it feels like to be a gay man in the middle of a straight world". Larry Anderson, one of the contestants, claimed that the special helped him overcome his own homophobia; he highlighted several meaningful interactions he had with his coaches. Jackie Beat, a drag performer and one of the coaches, criticized GLAAD's stance on the special and claimed that it did not portray gay people in a negative manner. Byram similarly expressed her disappointment with the special's negative reception, in which she claimed that "TV and the FCC [are] very sensitive right now".

== Cancelation ==
On May 27, 2004—only eleven days before the premiere of Seriously, Dude, I'm Gay—Fox announced that it had shelved the special. A Fox spokesperson claimed that the network "looked at [the special], and creatively it was not where we felt like it should be." This announcement came only hours after GLAAD scheduled a meeting with Fox's entertainment president, Gail Berman, to discuss its concerns over the special's portrayal of gay men. According to The Advocate, an "inside source" at Fox alleged that the special's cancelation was a result of Fox executives "believ[ing] the gay reality phenomenon was on the wane", primarily due to the underperformance of Playing It Straight and Queer Eye for the Straight Guy. The special was replaced on the Fox schedule with a telecasting of American Pie 2.

The cancelation of Seriously, Dude, I'm Gay received mixed responses. Giuliani primarily attributed the special's cancelation to pressures Fox faced from GLAAD; he criticized the organization for never directly discussing its concerns with the producers. However, Beat claimed that the network was clearly unenthusiastic about the special. He further claimed that the special's cancelation may indicate that LGBT representation in television was no longer shocking to audiences. In response to the cancelation, GLAAD commended Fox for "doing the right thing" and being responsive to the organization's concerns. One of the contestants, Larry Anderson, subsequently did a photo spread for The Advocate; the magazine interviewed Anderson, several of the special's producers, and a representative from GLAAD.

The special's abrupt cancelation prompted TBS executives to reach out to GLAAD for review of their own program, He's a Lady. Douglas Ross and Tommy Campbell claimed that they did not want to offend transgender people with He's a Lady, which depicted a competition between eleven men who received feminine makeovers and participated in weekly gender-specific challenges. Campbell explained: "We had heard about Seriously, Dude, I'm Gay and how it was controversial. We went to GLAAD to get their support and to show that this was a kind show." Despite this claim, GLAAD alleged that they were the ones to reach out to the producers after seeing a press release for the series. As a result of their consultation with GLAAD, Campbell stated that the organization helped the producers to "become more aware of transgender issues and the double standards of beauty". The cancellation of Seriously, Dude, I'm Gay also resulted in Fox organizing a meeting with GLAAD to discuss and improve the network's on-air representations of the LGBT community.

== Lawsuit ==
On August 23, 2005, Seriously, Dude, I'm Gay was one of several television programs cited in a class-action lawsuit filed by the Writers Guild of America. Known as Shriver v. Rocket Science Laboratories, the suit was filed in the Los Angeles County Superior Court and targeted the special's production company, Rocket Science Laboratories, alongside the special's network, Fox. The plaintiffs in the suit included writers and editors of the special who alleged violations of the California Labor Code. The employees claimed that the two companies violated labor laws in relation to overtime, wages, and meal periods. More specifically, the plaintiffs alleged that the companies forced employees to falsify time cards in order to be paid a flat weekly rate, despite the employees actually working nearly 80 hours a week with no meal breaks. In 2009, a settlement was reached between the two parties for $2.57 million, although Rocket Science Laboratories and Fox continued to deny all liability. Speaking on the settlement, Emma Leheny, an attorney for the plaintiffs, stated, "I'd like to say as a plaintiff's attorney that I cured cancer, that this case brought these violations to an end. But we know they still go on."

== See also ==
- List of television series canceled before airing an episode
