= Mike Darnell =

American television executive (born 1962 or 1963)

- Born: 1962 or 1963 (age 63–64); Philadelphia, Pennsylvania, U.S.
- Education: California State University, Northridge
- Occupation: Television executive
- Employer(s): Fox Broadcasting (1994–2013); Warner Bros. (2013–2023)
- Known for: Reality television projects
- Spouse: Carolyn Oberman
- Children: 1

Michael Darnell (born 1962 or 1963) is an American entertainment executive. As president of Alternative Entertainment at the Fox network and subsequently president of Unscripted Television at Warner Bros., Darnell was in charge of some of the most successful and longest-running franchises in television history, including American Idol, The Bachelor franchise, The Voice, Family Guy, Futurama, Hell's Kitchen, Kitchen Nightmares, MasterChef, Little Big Shots, The Ellen DeGeneres Show, So You Think You Can Dance, Are You Smarter Than a 5th Grader?, The Simple Life, Temptation Island, and many more.

== Background and personal life ==
Mike Darnell was born in Philadelphia, Pennsylvania, to Eileen and Doyle E. Darnell. His father was a policeman, and Darnell was raised and attended public school in Philadelphia's northeast section. When he was 10, a talent manager saw him singing at a Police Athletic League event and encouraged him to do commercials. When he was 12, his family moved to California, where he eventually appeared in, or voiced-over, some sixty commercials. He also appeared in TV episodes such as Sanford and Son, Welcome Back, Kotter and Kojak. Later he worked as a bank teller to help pay his way through Cal State-Northridge. He also played piano at a night spot. Soon after graduating, he had an internship at Entertainment Tonight, which he says he "hated", before he started working at Fox's West Coast flagship station KTTV, within their news department.

Darnell is married to Carolyn Oberman, a public relations executive who works for the Emmy Awards, and they have a daughter. As of 2018, he lives in Calabasas, California.

== Fox Broadcasting Company ==
Darnell became an executive at the Fox Broadcasting Company in 1994, initially under the title "director of specials", and during his 19 years at the network he rose through the ranks to become President of Alternative Entertainment.

He quickly made a name for himself with one of his first hits that came to broad attention in 1995 when a producer brought Darnell black-and-white footage that appeared to portray an alien being dissected. As the network feared accusations of propagating a hoax, the show was broadcast with the title Alien Autopsy: Fact or Fiction; it drew an audience of nearly twelve million viewers and was rebroadcast several more times. At one point, he produced over sixty specials a year for Fox, including When Animals Attack!, Who Wants to Marry a Multimillionaire?, World's Wildest Police Videos, and Breaking the Magician's Code: Magic's Biggest Secrets Finally Revealed. Darnell's projects were known for their often lurid and controversial nature, leading The New York Times to call him "Fox's point man for perversity" in 2000.

Series that Darnell developed and oversaw included American Idol, Hell's Kitchen, MasterChef, So You Think You Can Dance, The X Factor, Kitchen Nightmares, Are You Smarter Than a 5th Grader?, Temptation Island, The Simple Life, My Big Fat Obnoxious Fiancé, Joe Millionaire, Futurama and Family Guy.

With more than thirty million viewers at its peak, American Idol helped Fox rise from the last place network to eight consecutive seasons as the number one network. Darnell oversaw American Idol through its first twelve seasons.

Darnell told Variety that his proudest achievements during his time at Fox included American Idol, the success he had with Gordon Ramsay, and the season finale of Joe Millionaire, which drew about forty million viewers, outranking that year's Academy Awards, and became the network's most-viewed entertainment telecast. During Darnell's time at Fox, Mark Seal wrote in Vanity Fair that Darnell is "arguably the king of reality TV".

== Warner Bros. ==
In 2013, Darnell left Fox and began heading up the Unscripted & Alternative division at Warner Bros. where he is responsible for overseeing development and current programming for alternative broadcast series, high-end documentaries, unscripted streaming and cable series, and first-run syndication. In 2017, Darnell and his team oversaw 35 series across 20 different networks, including primetime series such as Ellen's Game of Games (NBC), The Voice (NBC), The Bachelor franchise (ABC), Mental Samurai (FOX), The Real, and The Ellen DeGeneres Show, among others. That same year, Deadline reported that in Darnell's first four years at Warner Bros, the studio had twelve unscripted series airing in primetime, more than any of its rivals.

In 2019 The World's Best aired on CBS hosted by James Corden. The series was produced by Darnell and his Warner Horizon Unscripted Television division in association with Mark Burnett and MGM Television and Ben Winston and Fulwell 73.

Darnell also created and executive produced the competition series Mental Samurai on Fox hosted by Rob Lowe. The series was produced by Darnell and Warner Horizon in association with Arthur Smith and A. Smith & Co. Productions and Jeff Apploff and Apploff Entertainment.

In 2021, Darnell launched the much-anticipated Friends: The Reunion, rebuilding the sets and bringing the whole cast back together at Warner Bros Stage 24 where the original show was filmed. After production was delayed multiple times because of COVID-19 production shutdowns, the special finally aired on May 27, 2021 and was watched by an estimated 29% of U.S. streaming households and became the top special to launch on HBO Max.

Darnell continued to find success with documentaries and events such as the Emmy-nominated HBO Max documentary Harry Potter 20th Anniversary: Return to Hogwarts, bringing the ensemble cast back together in a retrospective celebration of the franchise. In addition, Darnell produced Harry Potter: Hogwarts Tournament of Houses, hosted by Helen Mirren, which launched on TBS and Cartoon Network and was the most watched series across all cable networks for the year 2021.

Darnell's oversight of his Warner Bros Unscripted division was quite broad, averaging nearly 2,500 hours of programming annually across broadcast, cable, streaming, digital, first-run syndication and podcasts, and which made Darnell's division the leading unscripted studio in America. John Koblin, writing in the New York Times, described Darnell during his time at Warner Bros as "one of the longest-running and most successful executives in reality TV". Warner Bros. CEO Channing Dungey said Darnell's "record of success is unparalleled".

In July 2023, Darnell resigned from his position as President of Unscripted Television at Warner Bros, after 10 years in that role.
