= 2004–05 United States network television schedule =

The 2004–05 network television schedule for the six major English-language commercial broadcast networks in the United States covers the prime time hours from September 2004 to August 2005. The schedule is followed by a list per network of returning series, new series, and series canceled after the 2003–04 television season.

Beginning this season, largely resulting from continuing declines in prime time television viewership on that night of the week, the major networks ceased producing original scripted programs for broadcast on Saturday evenings (an exception being ABC's The Wonderful World of Disney, although it often featured rebroadcast material, mainly in the form of Disney theatrical films). From this point on, Saturday prime time network schedules would instead consist of nonfiction reality-based programs, rebroadcasts of scripted prime time series (most commonly featuring dramatic series), unaired episodes of de facto cancelled series that were being "burned off" after having been pulled from their previous timeslot on a different night, theatrical or made-for-television movies, and/or sporting events (which became increasingly common in the time period beginning with the 2012–13 season).

CBS unveiled it's fall line up on May 19, 2004. PBS is not included, as member television stations have local flexibility over most of their schedules and broadcast times for network shows may vary. Pax TV (now Ion Television) is also not included; although the network aired a few original first-run series, Pax's schedule at the time consisted primarily of syndicated reruns and movies.

Each of the 30 highest-rated shows released in May 2005 is listed with its rank and rating as determined by Nielsen Media Research.

New series are highlighted in bold.

Repeat airings or same-day rebroadcasts are indicated by (R).

All times are U.S. Eastern and Pacific Time, except for certain live events (such as Monday Night Football) that are broadcast simultaneously in all time zones. Subtract one hour for Central, Mountain, Alaska, and Hawaii–Aleutian times.

All sporting events air live in all time zones, with local and/or late-night programming (including those normally aired by Fox affiliates during the 10:00 p.m. ET/PT hour) being shown after the game's completion.

== Legend ==
- Light blue indicates local programming.
- Gray indicates encore programming.
- Blue-gray indicates news programming.
- Light green indicates sporting events.
- Light purple indicates movies.
- Red indicates series being burned off and other regularly scheduled programs, including specials.
- Yellow highlights indicates the top-10 most watched programs of the season.
- Cyan indicates the top 20 most watched programs of the season.
- Magenta indicates the top 30 most watched programs of the season.

== Sunday ==
Network		7:00 p.m.	7:30 p.m.	8:00 p.m.	8:30 p.m.	9:00 p.m.	9:30 p.m.	10:00 p.m.	10:30 p.m.
ABC	Fall	America's Funniest Home Videos		Extreme Makeover: Home Edition (18/9.1) (Tied with Medium)		**Desperate Housewives** (4/14.5)		**Boston Legal** (24/8.1)	
ABC	Winter	America's Funniest Home Videos		Extreme Makeover: Home Edition (18/9.1) (Tied with Medium)		**Desperate Housewives** (4/14.5)		**Boston Legal** (24/8.1)	
ABC	Spring	America's Funniest Home Videos		Extreme Makeover: Home Edition (18/9.1) (Tied with Medium)		**Desperate Housewives** (4/14.5)		**Grey's Anatomy** (8/11.6)	
ABC	Summer	America's Funniest Home Videos		Extreme Makeover: Home Edition (18/9.1) (Tied with Medium)		**My Kind of Town**		**Desperate Housewives** (R)	
CBS		60 Minutes (16/9.2) (Tied with Law & Order: Special Victims Unit)		Cold Case (14/9.7) (Tied with The Apprentice)		CBS Sunday Movie (27/7.6) (Tied with The Amazing Race)			
Fox	Fall	King of the Hill	Malcolm in the Middle	The Simpsons	Arrested Development	**My Big Fat Obnoxious Boss**		Local programming	
Fox	Winter	King of the Hill	Malcolm in the Middle	The Simpsons	Arrested Development	Family Guy (R)	The Simpsons (R)	Local programming	
Fox	Late winter	King of the Hill	Malcolm in the Middle	The Simpsons	Arrested Development	The Simpsons (R)	**Kelsey Grammer Presents: The Sketch Show**	Local programming	
Fox	Spring	King of the Hill	Malcolm in the Middle	The Simpsons	The Simpsons	Family Guy	**American Dad!**	Local programming	
Fox	Summer	Malcolm in the Middle (R)	King of the Hill (R)	The Simpsons	The Simpsons (R)	Family Guy	**American Dad!**	Local programming	
Fox	Mid-summer	Malcolm in the Middle (R)	King of the Hill (R)	The Simpsons	**The Princes of Malibu**	Family Guy	**American Dad!**	Local programming	
Fox	Late summer	Malcolm in the Middle (R)	King of the Hill (R)	The Simpsons	The Simpsons (R)	Family Guy	**American Dad!**	Local programming	
NBC	Fall	Dateline NBC		American Dreams		Law & Order: Criminal Intent (25/7.9)		Crossing Jordan (26/7.7)	
NBC	Winter	Dateline NBC		**The Contender**		Law & Order: Criminal Intent (25/7.9)		Crossing Jordan (26/7.7)	
NBC	Spring	Dateline NBC		**The Contender**		Law & Order: Criminal Intent (25/7.9)		Crossing Jordan (26/7.7)	
NBC	Summer	Dateline NBC				Law & Order: Criminal Intent (25/7.9)		Crossing Jordan (26/7.7)	
The WB	Fall	Steve Harvey's Big Time Challenge		Charmed		**Jack & Bobby**		Local programming	
The WB	Mid-fall	Steve Harvey's Big Time Challenge		Charmed		**The Mountain**		Local programming	
The WB	Winter	Summerland		Charmed		Steve Harvey's Big Time Challenge		Local programming	
The WB	Spring	Charmed		Charmed		Steve Harvey's Big Time Challenge		Local programming	
The WB	Summer	Charmed		WB Sunday Movie				Local programming	

== Monday ==
Network		8:00 PM	8:30 PM	9:00 PM	9:30 PM	10:00 PM	10:30 PM
ABC	Fall	**The Benefactor**		NFL Monday Showcase	Monday Night Football (10/10.8)		
ABC	November	**Life of Luxury**		NFL Monday Showcase	Monday Night Football (10/10.8)		
ABC	Winter	Extreme Makeover: Home Edition: How'd They Do That?		The Bachelorette		**Supernanny**	
ABC	Spring	Extreme Makeover: Home Edition: How'd They Do That?		The Bachelor		**Supernanny**	
ABC	Summer	**The Scholar**		The ABC Monday Night Movie			
ABC	Mid-Summer	The ABC Monday Night Movie					
CBS	Fall	Still Standing	**Listen Up**	Everybody Loves Raymond (9/11.2)	Two and a Half Men (11/10.6)	CSI: Miami (5/12.4)	
CBS	Winter	Still Standing	**Listen Up**	Everybody Loves Raymond (9/11.2)	Two and a Half Men (11/10.6)	CSI: Miami (5/12.4)	
CBS	Spring	Still Standing	**Listen Up**	Everybody Loves Raymond (9/11.2)	Two and a Half Men (11/10.6)	CSI: Miami (5/12.4)	
CBS	May	Still Standing	Everybody Loves Raymond (R)	Everybody Loves Raymond (9/11.2)	Two and a Half Men (11/10.6)	CSI: Miami (5/12.4)	
CBS	Summer	Still Standing	Still Standing	Everybody Loves Raymond (9/11.2)	Two and a Half Men (11/10.6)	CSI: Miami (5/12.4)	
CBS	Mid-Summer	The King of Queens (R)	Everybody Loves Raymond (9/11.2)	Two and a Half Men (11/10.6)	**Rock Star**	CSI: Miami (5/12.4)	
Fox	Fall	**North Shore**		**Renovate My Family**		Local programming	
Fox	Follow-up	**Trading Spouses: Meet Your New Mommy**		The Swan		Local programming	
Fox	Winter	**Trading Spouses: Meet Your New Mommy**		24		Local programming	
Fox	Late Winter	American Idol		24		Local programming	
Fox	Spring	**Nanny 911**		24		Local programming	
Fox	Summer	**Nanny 911**		**Hell's Kitchen**		Local programming	
NBC	Fall	Fear Factor		Las Vegas		**LAX**	
NBC	November	Fear Factor		Las Vegas		**$25 Million Dollar Hoax**	
NBC	December	Fear Factor		Las Vegas		Various Programming	
NBC	Winter	Fear Factor		Las Vegas		**Medium** (18/9.1; tied with Extreme Makeover: Home Edition)	
NBC	Spring	Fear Factor		Las Vegas		**Medium** (18/9.1; tied with Extreme Makeover: Home Edition)	
NBC	Summer	Fear Factor		Las Vegas		**Medium** (18/9.1; tied with Extreme Makeover: Home Edition)	
UPN	Fall	One on One	Half & Half	Girlfriends	**Second Time Around**	Local programming	
UPN	Winter	One on One	**Cuts**	Girlfriends	Half & Half	Local programming	
UPN	Spring	One on One	**Cuts**	Girlfriends	Half & Half	Local programming	
UPN	Summer	One on One	All of Us	Girlfriends	Half & Half	Local programming	
The WB	Fall	7th Heaven		Everwood		Local programming	
The WB	Winter	7th Heaven		Everwood		Local programming	
The WB	Spring	7th Heaven		Summerland		Local programming	
The WB	Follow-up	7th Heaven		Everwood		Local programming	
The WB	Summer	7th Heaven		Summerland		Local programming	

Note: Fox originally scheduled Athens (a drama series that was to center on the lives of a group of young adults in a fictional New England college town) as a midseason replacement in the 8:00 p.m. ET slot; however, the network cancelled the series last-minute.

== Tuesday ==
Network		8:00 PM	8:30 PM	9:00 PM	9:30 PM	10:00 PM	10:30 PM
ABC	Fall	My Wife & Kids	George Lopez	According to Jim	**Rodney**	NYPD Blue	
ABC	Winter	My Wife & Kids	George Lopez	According to Jim	**Rodney**	NYPD Blue	
ABC	Spring	My Wife & Kids	George Lopez	According to Jim	**Rodney**	**Blind Justice**	
ABC	Summer	My Wife & Kids	George Lopez	According to Jim	**Rodney**	**Blind Justice**	
ABC	Mid-Summer	My Wife & Kids	George Lopez	According to Jim	**Rodney**	**Empire**	
ABC	Late Summer	According to Jim	**Rodney**	According to Jim	**Rodney**	**Boston Legal**	
CBS	Fall	NCIS (22/8.8)		**Clubhouse**		Judging Amy (29/7.4; tied with The West Wing)	
CBS	November	NCIS (22/8.8)		The Amazing Race (27/7.6; tied with the CBS Sunday Movie)		Judging Amy (29/7.4; tied with The West Wing)	
CBS	Winter	NCIS (22/8.8)		The Amazing Race (27/7.6; tied with the CBS Sunday Movie)		Judging Amy (29/7.4; tied with The West Wing)	
CBS	Spring	NCIS (22/8.8)		The Amazing Race (27/7.6; tied with the CBS Sunday Movie)		Judging Amy (29/7.4; tied with The West Wing)	
CBS	Summer	NCIS (22/8.8)		**Fire Me...Please**		48 Hours	
CBS	Mid-Summer	NCIS (22/8.8)		Big Brother		**Rock Star**	
Fox	Fall	**Trading Spouses: Meet Your New Mommy**		**The Next Great Champ**		Local programming	
Fox	Late Fall	**The Rebel Billionaire: Branson's Quest for the Best**		**House** (23/8.3)		Local programming	
Fox	Winter	American Idol (2/15.7)		**House** (23/8.3)		Local programming	
Fox	Spring	American Idol (2/15.7)		**House** (23/8.3)		Local programming	
Fox	Summer	**Trading Spouses: Meet Your New Mommy**		**House** (23/8.3)		Local programming	
NBC	Fall	Last Comic Standing		**Father of the Pride**	Scrubs	Law & Order: Special Victims Unit (16/9.2; tied with 60 Minutes)	
NBC	Late Fall	**The Biggest Loser**			Scrubs	Law & Order: Special Victims Unit (16/9.2; tied with 60 Minutes)	
NBC	Winter	**The Biggest Loser**		Scrubs	**Committed**	Law & Order: Special Victims Unit (16/9.2; tied with 60 Minutes)	
NBC	Mid-Winter	**Most Outrageous Moments** / Law & Order: Criminal Intent (R)		Scrubs	**Committed**	Law & Order: Special Victims Unit (16/9.2; tied with 60 Minutes)	
NBC	Spring	Will & Grace (R)	Scrubs (R)	Scrubs	**The Office**	Law & Order: Special Victims Unit (16/9.2; tied with 60 Minutes)	
NBC	Late Spring	**Most Outrageous Moments**	**Most Outrageous Moments**	Scrubs	**The Office**	Law & Order: Special Victims Unit (16/9.2; tied with 60 Minutes)	
NBC	Summer	Average Joe: The Joes Strike Back		**I Want To Be a Hilton**		Law & Order: Special Victims Unit (16/9.2; tied with 60 Minutes)	
NBC	Mid-Summer	**Meet Mister Mom**		**I Want To Be a Hilton**		Law & Order: Special Victims Unit (16/9.2; tied with 60 Minutes)	
NBC	Late Summer	Various Programming		**Tommy Lee Goes to College**	**The Office**	Law & Order: Special Victims Unit (16/9.2; tied with 60 Minutes)	
UPN	Fall	All of Us	Eve	**Veronica Mars**		Local programming	
UPN	Winter	All of Us	Eve	**Veronica Mars**		Local programming	
UPN	Spring	All of Us	Eve	**Veronica Mars**		Local programming	
UPN	Late Spring	All of Us	Eve	**Britney and Kevin: Chaotic**	**The Bad Girl's Guide**	Local programming	
UPN	Summer	All of Us	Half & Half	Girlfriends	**The Bad Girl's Guide**	Local programming	
UPN	Mid-Summer	One on One	All of Us	Girlfriends	Half & Half	Local programming	
UPN	Late Summer	One on One	Eve	**R U the Girl with T-Boz and Chilli**		Local programming	
The WB	Fall	Gilmore Girls		One Tree Hill		Local programming	
The WB	Winter	Gilmore Girls		High School Reunion		Local programming	
The WB	Mid-Winter	Gilmore Girls		One Tree Hill		Local programming	
The WB	Spring	Gilmore Girls		**The Starlet**		Local programming	
The WB	Follow-up	Gilmore Girls		One Tree Hill		Local programming	
The WB	Summer	Gilmore Girls		One Tree Hill		Local programming	

Notes:

- NBC originally intended for Average Joe to air on its Fall schedule in the 8:00 p.m. ET slot; it chose to delay the reality dating series to Summer. The network originally scheduled The Contender to premiere on March 1, 2005 in the 8:00 p.m. ET slot, but opted to delay its premiere to March 9, before switching timeslots with American Dreams, which had been airing on Sundays during that hour.
- Fox originally intended to air a Fall run of legal drama The Jury (which premiered on June 8) in its existing Tuesday slot prior to November; however on July 27, it cancelled the series due to low ratings. (The two remaining episodes of its 10-episode order aired as scheduled on July 30 and August 6.)

== Wednesday ==
Network		8:00 PM	8:30 PM	9:00 PM	9:30 PM	10:00 PM	10:30 PM
ABC	Fall	**Lost** (13/9.8)		The Bachelor		**Wife Swap**	
ABC	Winter	**Lost** (13/9.8)		Alias		**Wife Swap**	
ABC	Spring	**Lost** (13/9.8)		Alias		**Eyes**	
ABC	Summer	**Supernanny**		**Dancing with the Stars**		**Lost** (13/9.8)	
ABC	Mid-Summer	**Brat Camp**		**Brat Camp**		**Lost** (13/9.8)	
CBS	Fall	60 Minutes		CSI: Crime Scene Investigation		**CSI: NY** (20/8.9; tied with Law & Order)	
CBS	Follow-up	60 Minutes Wednesday		The King of Queens	**Center of the Universe**	**CSI: NY** (20/8.9; tied with Law & Order)	
CBS	Winter	60 Minutes Wednesday		The King of Queens	Yes, Dear	**CSI: NY** (20/8.9; tied with Law & Order)	
CBS	Spring	60 Minutes Wednesday		The King of Queens	Yes, Dear	**CSI: NY** (20/8.9; tied with Law & Order)	
CBS	Summer	60 Minutes Wednesday		The King of Queens	Yes, Dear	**CSI: NY** (20/8.9; tied with Law & Order)	
CBS	Mid-Summer	**The Cut**		**Rock Star**	The King of Queens	**CSI: NY** (20/8.9; tied with Law & Order)	
CBS	Follow-up	Still Standing	Yes, Dear	**Rock Star**	The King of Queens	**CSI: NY** (20/8.9; tied with Law & Order)	
Fox	Fall	That '70s Show	**Quintuplets**	The Bernie Mac Show	The Bernie Mac Show	Local programming	
Fox	Follow-up	That '70s Show	**Quintuplets**	**Nanny 911**		Local programming	
Fox	Winter	That '70s Show	The Simple Life	American Idol (3/15.3)		Local programming	
Fox	Spring	That '70s Show	The Simple Life	American Idol (3/15.3)	**Life on a Stick**	Local programming	
Fox	Mid-Spring	The Simple Life	**Stacked**	American Idol (3/15.3)	**Life on a Stick**	Local programming	
Fox	Late Spring	That '70s Show	That '70s Show	American Idol (3/15.3)	**Stacked**	Local programming	
Fox	Summer	That '70s Show	**Stacked**	**The Inside**		Local programming	
Fox	Mid-Summer	**So You Think You Can Dance**			The Bernie Mac Show	Local programming	
NBC	Fall	**Hawaii**		The West Wing (29/7.4; tied with Judging Amy)		Law & Order (20/8.9; tied with CSI: NY)	
NBC	Follow-up	**LAX**		The West Wing (29/7.4; tied with Judging Amy)		Law & Order (20/8.9; tied with CSI: NY)	
NBC	Winter	**Sports Illustrated Swimsuit Model Search**		The West Wing (29/7.4; tied with Judging Amy)		Law & Order (20/8.9; tied with CSI: NY)	
NBC	Spring	American Dreams		The West Wing (29/7.4; tied with Judging Amy)		Law & Order (20/8.9; tied with CSI: NY)	
NBC	Follow-up	Dateline NBC		**Revelations**		Law & Order (20/8.9; tied with CSI: NY)	
NBC	Summer	**Psychic Detectives**		Law & Order		Law & Order (20/8.9; tied with CSI: NY)	
NBC	Mid-Summer	**Most Outrageous Moments**	**Most Outrageous Moments**	Law & Order		Law & Order (20/8.9; tied with CSI: NY)	
NBC	Late Summer	**Meet Mister Mom**		Law & Order		Law & Order (20/8.9; tied with CSI: NY)	
UPN	Fall	America's Next Top Model		**Kevin Hill**		Local programming	
UPN	Winter	**The Road to Stardom with Missy Elliott**		**Kevin Hill**		Local programming	
UPN	Spring	America's Next Top Model		**Kevin Hill**		Local programming	
UPN	Summer	Eve	Eve	**Veronica Mars**		Local programming	
UPN	Mid-Summer	**R U the Girl with T-Boz and Chilli**		**Veronica Mars**		Local programming	
The WB	Fall	Smallville		**The Mountain**		Local programming	
The WB	Follow-up	Smallville		**Jack & Bobby**		Local programming	
The WB	Late Fall	Smallville		**Big Man on Campus**		Local programming	
The WB	Winter	Smallville		**Jack & Bobby**		Local programming	
The WB	Spring	Smallville		**Jack & Bobby**		Local programming	
The WB	Summer	**Beauty and the Geek**		Smallville		Local programming	
The WB	Mid-Summer	One Tree Hill		Smallville		Local programming	

Note: Fox originally intended for Method & Red to remain in the 9:30 p.m. ET slot, but cancelled it due to low ratings. The network also intended to air Life on a Stick at 8:30 p.m. ET and The Bernie Mac Show at 9:30 p.m. ET in midseason, but ultimately chose instead to air That '70s Show and Life on a Stick in those respective timeslots.

== Thursday ==
Network		8:00 PM	8:30 PM	9:00 PM	9:30 PM	10:00 PM	10:30 PM
ABC	Fall	Extreme Makeover		**Life as We Know It**		Primetime Live	
ABC	Winter	Extreme Makeover		**Life as We Know It**		Primetime Live	
ABC	January	**Life as We Know It**		Extreme Makeover		Primetime Live	
ABC	Follow-up	Extreme Makeover		Extreme Makeover		Primetime Live	
ABC	Spring	**Jake in Progress**	**Jake in Progress**	Extreme Makeover		Primetime Live	
ABC	Follow-up	ABC Thursday Night Movie				Primetime Live	
ABC	Summer	ABC Thursday Night Movie				Primetime Live	
ABC	Mid-Summer	Extreme Makeover		**Hooking Up**		Primetime Live	
CBS	Fall	Survivor: Vanuatu – Islands of Fire (7/12.0)		CSI: Crime Scene Investigation (1/16.5)		Without a Trace (6/12.3)	
CBS	Winter	Survivor: Vanuatu – Islands of Fire (7/12.0)		CSI: Crime Scene Investigation (1/16.5)		Without a Trace (6/12.3)	
CBS	January	**Wickedly Perfect**		CSI: Crime Scene Investigation (1/16.5)		Without a Trace (6/12.3)	
CBS	February	Survivor: Palau (7/12.0)		CSI: Crime Scene Investigation (1/16.5)		Without a Trace (6/12.3)	
CBS	Spring	Survivor: Palau (7/12.0)		CSI: Crime Scene Investigation (1/16.5)		Without a Trace (6/12.3)	
CBS	Summer	**The Cut**		CSI: Crime Scene Investigation (1/16.5)		Without a Trace (6/12.3)	
CBS	Mid-Summer	Big Brother		CSI: Crime Scene Investigation (1/16.5)		Without a Trace (6/12.3)	
Fox	Fall	The O.C.		**North Shore**		Local programming	
Fox	Winter	The O.C.		**Point Pleasant**		Local programming	
Fox	Spring	The O.C.		Tru Calling		Local programming	
Fox	Summer	The O.C.		The O.C.		Local programming	
Fox	Mid-Summer	That '70s Show	That '70s Show	The O.C.		Local programming	
NBC	Fall	**Joey**	Will & Grace	The Apprentice (14/9.7; tied with Cold Case)		ER (12/10.4)	
NBC	Winter	**Joey**	Will & Grace	The Apprentice (14/9.7; tied with Cold Case)		ER (12/10.4)	
NBC	Spring	**Joey**	Will & Grace	The Apprentice (14/9.7; tied with Cold Case)		ER (12/10.4)	
NBC	June	**Joey**	Will & Grace	**Hit Me Baby, One More Time**		ER (12/10.4)	
NBC	Summer	**Joey**	Will & Grace	**Hit Me Baby, One More Time**		ER (12/10.4)	
NBC	July	**Joey**	**Joey**	Will & Grace	Will & Grace	ER (12/10.4)	
NBC	Follow-up	**Joey**	Will & Grace	**The Law Firm**		ER (12/10.4)	
NBC	August	**Joey**	Will & Grace	Scrubs	Will & Grace	ER (12/10.4)	
UPN		WWE Thursday Night SmackDown!				Local programming	
The WB	Fall	Blue Collar TV	**Drew Carey's Green Screen Show**	Various drama encores (R)		Local programming	
The WB	Follow-up	The WB Thursday Night Movie				Local programming	
The WB	Winter	The WB Thursday Night Movie				Local programming	
The WB	Spring	Blue Collar TV	Blue Collar TV	Blue Collar TV	Blue Collar TV	Local programming	
The WB	Summer	Blue Collar TV	Blue Collar TV	**Beauty and the Geek**		Local programming	
The WB	Mid-Summer	Smallville		Everwood		Local programming	

Note: Fox originally intended to place Tru Calling in the 9:00 p.m. ET slot, but elected to push up its second season to Spring and run North Shore in the Fall instead.

== Friday ==
Network		8:00 PM	8:30 PM	9:00 PM	9:30 PM	10:00 PM	10:30 PM
ABC	Fall	8 Simple Rules	**Complete Savages**	Hope & Faith	Less than Perfect	20/20	
ABC	Winter	8 Simple Rules	8 Simple Rules (R)	Hope & Faith	Less than Perfect	20/20	
ABC	Spring	America's Funniest Home Videos		Hope & Faith	Less than Perfect	20/20	
ABC	Summer	8 Simple Rules	Hope & Faith	Hope & Faith	Less than Perfect	20/20	
CBS	Fall	Joan of Arcadia		JAG		**Dr. Vegas**	
CBS	Follow-up	Joan of Arcadia		JAG		CSI: Miami (R)	
CBS	Winter	Joan of Arcadia		JAG		**Numb3rs**	
CBS	Spring	Joan of Arcadia		JAG		**Numb3rs**	
CBS	Summer	JAG		JAG		**Numb3rs**	
CBS	Mid-Summer	60 Minutes II		**The Cut**		**Numb3rs**	
Fox	Fall	**The Complex: Malibu**		**The Next Great Champ** (R)		Local programming	
Fox	Follow-up	The Simpsons (R)	That '70s Show (R)	**The Complex: Malibu**		Local programming	
Fox	Late Fall	Totally Outrageous Behavior	**World's Craziest Videos**	**Renovate My Family**		Local programming	
Fox	December	Fox Friday Night Movie				Local programming	
Fox	Winter	The Bernie Mac Show	The Bernie Mac Show	**Jonny Zero**		Local programming	
Fox	Spring	The Bernie Mac Show	Malcolm in the Middle	That '70s Show (R)		Local programming	
Fox	Follow-up	Fox Friday Night Movie				Local programming	
Fox	Summer	Fox Friday Night Movie				Local programming	
Fox	Late Summer	The Bernie Mac Show	Arrested Development	Malcolm in the Middle	Arrested Development	Local programming	
NBC	Fall	Dateline NBC		Third Watch		**Medical Investigation**	
NBC	Winter	Dateline NBC		Third Watch		**Medical Investigation**	
NBC	Spring	Dateline NBC		**Medical Investigation**		**Law & Order: Trial by Jury**	
NBC	Mid-Spring	Dateline NBC		Third Watch		**Law & Order: Trial by Jury**	
NBC	Summer	Dateline NBC				**Law & Order: Trial by Jury**	
NBC	Late Summer	Dateline NBC				Crossing Jordan	
UPN	Fall	Star Trek: Enterprise		America's Next Top Model (R)		Local programming	
UPN	Winter	Star Trek: Enterprise		**The Road to Stardom with Missy Elliott** (R)		Local programming	
UPN	Spring	Star Trek: Enterprise		America's Next Top Model (R)		Local programming	
UPN	Summer	UPN's Night at the Movies				Local programming	
The WB	Fall	What I Like About You	Grounded for Life	Reba	Blue Collar TV	Local programming	
The WB	Follow-up	What I Like About You	Grounded for Life	Reba	Reba (R)	Local programming	
The WB	Late Fall	What I Like About You	Grounded for Life	Reba	Blue Collar TV	Local programming	
The WB	Winter	What I Like About You	Blue Collar TV	Reba	Blue Collar TV	Local programming	
The WB	Spring	What I Like About You	Reba (R)	Reba	**Living With Fran**	Local programming	
The WB	Summer	What I Like About You	What I Like About You	Reba	**Living With Fran**	Local programming	
The WB	Mid-Summer	What I Like About You	Blue Collar TV	Reba	**Living With Fran**	Local programming	

Notes:

- Fox originally planned to keep The Jury on Fridays, while also slotting The Next Great Champ as its lead-in in the 8:00 p.m. ET hour; because of The Jury's cancellation, The Complex: Malibu was picked up last-minute to occupy the slot. The network also originally scheduled The Inside in the 8:00 p.m. ET hour (leading into Jonny Zero) for midseason.
- The WB originally scheduled the sitcom Commando Nanny in the 9:30 p.m. ET slot; however, it was cancelled prior to the start of the Fall schedule due to production difficulties, resulting in its substitution by Blue Collar TV.

== Saturday ==
Network		8:00 p.m.	8:30 p.m.	9:00 p.m.	9:30 p.m.	10:00 p.m.	10:30 p.m.
ABC	Fall	The Wonderful World of Disney				**Desperate Housewives** (R)	
ABC	Winter	The Wonderful World of Disney				**Desperate Housewives** (R)	
ABC	Spring	**Little House on the Prairie**		**ABC Saturday Movie of the Week**			
ABC	Late spring	The Wonderful World of Disney				**Desperate Housewives** (R)	
ABC	Summer	The Wonderful World of Disney				America's Funniest Home Videos (R)	
CBS	Fall	**Crimetime Saturday**				48 Hours Mystery	
CBS	Winter	**The Will**		**Crimetime Saturday**		48 Hours Mystery	
CBS	Mid-winter	**Crimetime Saturday**				48 Hours Mystery	
CBS	Late winter	**Wickedly Perfect**		**Crimetime Saturday**		48 Hours Mystery	
CBS	Spring	**Crimetime Saturday**				48 Hours Mystery	
CBS	Summer	Big Brother		**Crimetime Saturday**		48 Hours Mystery	
Fox		COPS	COPS (R)	America's Most Wanted		Local programming	
NBC	Fall	Various programming				Law & Order: Special Victims Unit (R)	
NBC	Mid-fall	NBC Saturday Night Movie				Law & Order: Special Victims Unit (R)	
NBC	Winter	Law & Order (R)		Law & Order: Criminal Intent (R)		Law & Order: Special Victims Unit (R)	
NBC	Late winter	**LAX**		Law & Order: Special Victims Unit (R)		Law & Order: Criminal Intent (R)	
NBC	Spring	Crossing Jordan (R)		Law & Order: Special Victims Unit (R)		Law & Order (R)	
NBC	Summer	NBC Saturday Night Movie				Dateline NBC	

== By network ==
=== ABC ===
**Returning series**

- 20/20
- 8 Simple Rules
- The ABC Monday Night Movie
- ABC Thursday Night Movie
- According to Jim
- Alias
- America's Funniest Home Videos
- The Bachelor
- The Bachelorette
- Extreme Makeover
- Extreme Makeover: Home Edition
- George Lopez
- Hope & Faith
- Less than Perfect
- Monday Night Football
- My Wife and Kids
- NYPD Blue
- Primetime Live
- The Wonderful World of Disney

**New series**

- **ABC Saturday Movie of the Week**
- **The Benefactor**
- **Blind Justice** *
- **Boston Legal**
- **Brat Camp** *
- **Complete Savages**
- **Dancing with the Stars** *
- **Desperate Housewives**
- **Empire** *
- **Eyes** *
- **Grey's Anatomy** *
- **Hooking Up** *
- **Jake in Progress** *
- **Life as We Know It**
- **Life of Luxury** *
- **Lost**
- **My Kind of Town** *
- **Rodney**
- **The Scholar** *
- **Supernanny** *
- **Wife Swap**

Not returning from 2003–04:

- 10-8: Officers on Duty
- The Big House
- The D.A.
- The Drew Carey Show
- I'm With Her
- It's All Relative
- Karen Sisco
- Kingdom Hospital
- Life with Bonnie
- Line of Fire
- Married to the Kellys
- NHL on ABC (returned for 2021–22)
- The Practice
- Threat Matrix
- The Ultimate Love Test

=== CBS ===
**Returning series**

- 48 Hours
- 60 Minutes
- The Amazing Race
- Big Brother
- Cold Case
- CBS Sunday Movie
- CSI: Crime Scene Investigation
- CSI: Miami
- Everybody Loves Raymond
- JAG
- Joan of Arcadia
- Judging Amy
- The King of Queens
- NCIS
- Still Standing
- Survivor
- Two and a Half Men
- Without a Trace
- Yes, Dear

**New series**

- **Center of the Universe**
- **Clubhouse**
- **Crimetime Saturday**
- **CSI: NY**
- **The Cut** *
- **Dr. Vegas**
- **Fire Me...Please** *
- **Listen Up**
- **Numb3rs**
- **Rock Star** *
- **Wickedly Perfect** *
- **The Will** *

Not returning from 2003–04:

- Becker
- The Brotherhood of Poland, New Hampshire
- Century City
- The District
- The Guardian
- Hack
- The Handler
- Star Search
- The Stones

=== Fox ===
**Returning series**

- 24
- America's Most Wanted
- American Idol
- Arrested Development
- The Bernie Mac Show
- Cops
- Family Guy
- FOX Friday Night Movie
- King of the Hill
- Malcolm in the Middle
- The O.C.
- The Simple Life
- The Simpsons
- That '70s Show
- The Swan
- Totally Outrageous Behavior
- Tru Calling

**New series**

- **American Dad!** *
- **The Complex: Malibu** *
- **Hell's Kitchen** *
- **House**
- **The Inside** *
- **Jonny Zero** *
- **Life on a Stick** *
- **My Big Fat Obnoxious Boss**
- **Nanny 911**
- **The Next Great Champ** *
- **North Shore** *
- **Quintuplets**
- **Point Pleasant** *
- **The Princes of Malibu** *
- **The Rebel Billionaire: Branson's Quest for the Best**
- **Renovate My Family** *
- **The Sketch Show** *
- **So You Think You Can Dance** *
- **Stacked** *
- **Trading Spouses**
- **Who's Your Daddy?** *
- **World's Craziest Videos** *

Not returning from 2003–04:

- A Minute with Stan Hooper
- American Juniors
- Boston Public
- Cracking Up
- Forever Eden
- Joe Millionaire (revived and returned for 2021–22)
- Luis
- Method & Red
- My Big Fat Obnoxious Fiance
- Oliver Beene
- Skin (returned to Soapnet in 2005)
- Wonderfalls

=== NBC ===
**Returning series**

- American Dreams
- The Apprentice
- Crossing Jordan
- Dateline NBC
- ER
- Fear Factor
- Las Vegas
- Last Comic Standing
- Law & Order
- Law & Order: Criminal Intent
- Law & Order: Special Victims Unit
- Scrubs
- Third Watch
- The West Wing
- Will & Grace

**New series**

- **$25 Million Dollar Hoax** *
- **The Biggest Loser**
- **Committed** *
- **The Contender** *
- **Father of the Pride**
- **Hawaii**
- **Hit Me Baby, One More Time** *
- **Joey**
- **Law & Order: Trial by Jury** *
- **The Law Firm** *
- **LAX**
- **Medical Investigation**
- **Medium** *
- **Meet Mister Mom** *
- **Most Outrageous Moments** *
- **The Office** *
- **Revelations** *
- **Sports Illustrated Swimsuit Model Search** *
- **Tommy Lee Goes to College** *
- **I Want To Be a Hilton** *

Not returning from 2003–04:

- Average Joe
- Boomtown
- Come to Papa
- Coupling
- Crime & Punishment
- Ed
- Frasier (revived by Paramount+ in 2022)
- Friends
- Good Morning Miami
- Happy Family
- The Lyon's Den
- Miss Match
- The Restaurant
- The Tracy Morgan Show
- Whoopi

=== UPN ===
**Returning series**

- All of Us
- America's Next Top Model
- Eve
- Girlfriends
- Half & Half
- One on One
- Star Trek: Enterprise
- UPN's Night at the Movies
- WWE SmackDown

**New series**

- **The Bad Girl's Guide** *
- **Britney and Kevin: Chaotic** *
- **Cuts** *
- **Kevin Hill**
- **The Road to Stardom with Missy Elliott** *
- **R U the Girl with T-Boz & Chilli**. *
- **Second Time Around**
- **Veronica Mars**

Not returning from 2003–04:

- Amish in the City
- Game Over
- Jake 2.0
- The Mullets
- The Parkers
- The Player
- Rock Me Baby

=== The WB ===
**Returning series**

- 7th Heaven
- Blue Collar TV
- Charmed
- Everwood
- Flix From the Frog
- Gilmore Girls
- Grounded for Life
- High School Reunion
- One Tree Hill
- Reba
- Smallville
- Steve Harvey's Big Time
- Summerland
- The WB Thursday Night Movie
- What I Like About You

**New series**

- **Big Man on Campus**
- **Drew Carey's Green Screen Show** *
- **Jack & Bobby**
- **Living With Fran**
- **The Mountain**
- **The Starlet** *

Not returning from 2003–04:

- All About the Andersons
- Angel
- The Help
- The Jamie Kennedy Experiment
- Like Family
- Run of the House
- The Surreal Life
- Tarzan

Note: The * indicates that the program was introduced in midseason.

== Renewals and cancellations ==
=== Renewals ===
==== ABC ====
- According to Jim—Renewed for the 2005–2006 season.
- Alias—Renewed for the 2005–2006 season.
- Boston Legal—Renewed for the 2005–2006 season.
- Desperate Housewives—Renewed for the 2005–2006 season.
- George Lopez—Renewed for the 2005–2006 season.
- Grey's Anatomy—Renewed for the 2005–2006 season.
- Hope & Faith—Renewed for the 2005–2006 season.
- Jake in Progress—Renewed for the 2005–2006 season.
- Less than Perfect—Renewed for the 2005–2006 season.
- Lost—Renewed for the 2005–2006 season.
- Rodney—Renewed for the 2005–2006 season.

==== CBS ====
- Cold Case—Renewed for the 2005–2006 season.
- CSI: Crime Scene Investigation—Renewed for the 2005–2006 season.
- CSI: Miami—Renewed for the 2005–2006 season.
- CSI: NY—Renewed for the 2005–2006 season.
- The King of Queens—Renewed for the 2005–2006 season.
- NCIS—Renewed for the 2005–2006 season.
- Numbers—Renewed for the 2005–2006 season.
- Still Standing—Renewed for the 2005–2006 season.
- Two and a Half Men—Renewed for the 2005–2006 season.
- Without a Trace—Renewed for the 2005–2006 season.
- Yes, Dear—Renewed for the 2005–2006 season.

==== Fox ====
- 24—Renewed for the 2005–2006 season.
- American Dad!—Renewed for the 2005–2006 season.
- Arrested Development—Renewed for the 2005–2006 season.
- The Bernie Mac Show—Renewed for the 2005–2006 season.
- House—Renewed for the 2005–2006 season.
- King of the Hill—Renewed for the 2005–2006 season.
- Malcolm in the Middle—Renewed for the 2005–2006 season.
- The O.C.—Renewed for the 2005–2006 season.
- The Simpsons—Renewed for the 2005–2006 season.
- Stacked—Renewed for the 2005–2006 season.
- That '70s Show—Renewed for the 2005–2006 season.

==== NBC ====
- Crossing Jordan—Renewed for the 2005–2006 season.
- ER—Renewed for the 2005–2006 season.
- Joey—Renewed for the 2005–2006 season.
- Las Vegas—Renewed for the 2005–2006 season.
- Law & Order—Renewed for the 2005–2006 season.
- Law & Order: Special Victims Unit—Renewed for the 2005–2006 season.
- Law & Order: Criminal Intent—Renewed for the 2005–2006 season.
- Medium—Renewed for the 2005–2006 season.
- The Office—Renewed for the 2005–2006 season.
- Scrubs—Renewed for the 2005–2006 season.
- The West Wing—Renewed for the 2005–2006 season.
- Will & Grace—Renewed for the 2005–2006 season.

==== UPN ====
- All of Us—Renewed for the 2005–2006 season.
- Cuts—Renewed for the 2005–2006 season.
- Eve—Renewed for the 2005–2006 season.
- Girlfriends—Renewed for the 2005–2006 season.
- Half & Half—Renewed for the 2005–2006 season.
- One on One—Renewed for the 2005–2006 season.
- Veronica Mars—Renewed for the 2005–2006 season.

==== The WB ====
- 7th Heaven—Renewed for the 2005–2006 season.
- Charmed—Renewed for the 2005–2006 season.
- Everwood—Renewed for the 2005–2006 season.
- Gilmore Girls—Renewed for the 2005–2006 season.
- Living With Fran—Renewed for the 2005–2006 season.
- One Tree Hill—Renewed for the 2005–2006 season.
- Reba—Renewed for the 2005–2006 season.
- Smallville—Renewed for the 2005–2006 season.
- What I Like About You—Renewed for the 2005–2006 season.

=== Cancellations/series endings ===
==== ABC ====
- 8 Simple Rules—Ended after three seasons.
- Blind Justice—Canceled after one season.
- Complete Savages—Canceled after one season.
- Eyes—Canceled after one season.
- Life as We Know It—Canceled after one season.
- My Wife and Kids—Ended after five seasons.
- NYPD Blue—Ended after twelve seasons.

==== CBS ====
- Center of the Universe—Canceled after one season.
- Clubhouse—Canceled after one season.
- Dr. Vegas—Canceled after one season.
- Everybody Loves Raymond—Ended after nine seasons.
- JAG—Ended after ten seasons.
- Joan of Arcadia—Canceled after two seasons.
- Judging Amy—Ended after six seasons.
- Listen Up—Canceled after one season.

==== Fox ====
- The Inside—Canceled after one season.
- Jonny Zero—Canceled after one season.
- Life on a Stick—Canceled after one season.
- North Shore—Canceled after one season.
- Point Pleasant—Canceled after one season.
- Quintuplets—Canceled after one season.
- Tru Calling—Canceled after two seasons.

==== NBC ====
- American Dreams—Ended after three seasons.
- Committed—Canceled after one season.
- Father of the Pride—Canceled after one season.
- Hawaii—Canceled after one season.
- LAX—Canceled after one season.
- Medical Investigation—Canceled after one season.
- Third Watch—Ended after six seasons.

==== UPN ====
- The Bad Girl's Guide—Canceled after one season.
- Kevin Hill—Canceled after one season.
- Second Time Around—Canceled after one season.
- Star Trek: Enterprise—Ended after four seasons.

==== The WB ====
- Grounded for Life—Ended after five seasons.
- Jack & Bobby—Canceled after one season.
- The Mountain—Canceled after one season.
- Summerland—Canceled after two seasons.
