= 2003–04 United States network television schedule =

The following is the 2003–04 network television schedule for the six major English language commercial broadcast networks in the United States. The schedule covers primetime hours from September 2003 through August 2004. The schedule is followed by a list per network of returning series, new series, and series cancelled after the 2002–03 season. All times are Eastern and Pacific, with certain exceptions, such as Monday Night Football.

New series are highlighted in bold.

Each of the 30 highest-rated shows is listed with its rank and rating as determined by Nielsen Media Research.

Yellow indicates the programs in the top 10 for the season.
Cyan indicates the programs in the top 20 for the season.
Magenta indicates the programs in the top 30 for the season.

Other Legend

- Light blue indicates local programming.
- Gray indicates encore programming.
- Blue-gray indicates news programming.
- Light green indicates sporting events.
- Light Purple indicates movies.
- Red indicates series being burned off and other scheduled programs, including specials.

PBS is not included; member stations have local flexibility over most of their schedules and broadcast times for network shows may vary. Also not included are stations affiliated with Pax TV, as its schedule is composed mainly of syndicated reruns although it also carried a limited schedule of first-run programs.

The 2003–2004 season marked the final time that the major networks scheduled substantial original scripted drama series on Saturdays. After years of declining ratings on that particular evening, beginning with the 2004–2005 season the networks ceased scheduling original dramas on Saturdays, choosing instead to fill the schedule with non-fiction programming and reruns.

From August 13 to 29, 2004, all of NBC's primetime programming was preempted in favor of coverage of the 2004 Summer Olympics.

== Sunday ==
Network		7:00 p.m.	7:30 p.m.	8:00 p.m.	8:30 p.m.	9:00 p.m.	9:30 p.m.	10:00 p.m.	10:30 p.m.
ABC	Fall	America's Funniest Home Videos		**10-8: Officers on Duty**		Alias		The Practice	
ABC	Winter	America's Funniest Home Videos		**Extreme Makeover: Home Edition**		Alias		The Practice	
ABC	Spring	America's Funniest Home Videos		**Extreme Makeover: Home Edition**		Alias		The Practice	
ABC	Summer	America's Funniest Home Videos		**Extreme Makeover: Home Edition**		Alias		The Practice	
CBS		60 Minutes (16/9.4)		**Cold Case** (17/9.3)		CBS Sunday Movie (#23/7.8) (Tied with The West Wing and Navy: NCIS)			
Fox	Fall	King of the Hill (R)	King of the Hill	The Simpsons	The Bernie Mac Show	Malcolm in the Middle	**Arrested Development**	Local programming	
Fox	Winter	King of the Hill	Oliver Beene	The Simpsons	The Bernie Mac Show	Malcolm in the Middle	**Arrested Development**	Local programming	
Fox	Spring	King of the Hill (R)	King of the Hill	The Simpsons	The Simpsons (R)	Malcolm in the Middle	**Arrested Development**	Local programming	
Fox	Late spring	Oliver Beene	King of the Hill	The Simpsons	**Arrested Development** (R)	Malcolm in the Middle	**Arrested Development**	Local programming	
Fox	Summer	King of the Hill (R)	Malcolm in the Middle (R)	The Simpsons	**Arrested Development** (R)	**The Simple Life** (R)	**Quintuplets** (R)	Local programming	
Fox	Mid-summer	King of the Hill (R)	Malcolm in the Middle (R)	The Simpsons	**Arrested Development** (R)	**The Casino**		Local programming	
NBC	Fall	Dateline NBC		American Dreams		Law & Order: Criminal Intent (19/8.6) (Tied with Crossing Jordan)		**The Lyon's Den**	
NBC	Winter	Dateline NBC		American Dreams		Law & Order: Criminal Intent (19/8.6) (Tied with Crossing Jordan)		Crossing Jordan (19/8.6) (Tied with Law & Order: Criminal Intent)	
NBC	Spring	Dateline NBC		American Dreams		Law & Order: Criminal Intent (19/8.6) (Tied with Crossing Jordan)		Crossing Jordan (19/8.6) (Tied with Law & Order: Criminal Intent)	
NBC	Summer	Dateline NBC		American Dreams		Law & Order: Criminal Intent (19/8.6) (Tied with Crossing Jordan)		Crossing Jordan (19/8.6) (Tied with Law & Order: Criminal Intent)	
The WB	Fall	Smallville (R)		Charmed		**Tarzan**		Local programming	
The WB	Late fall	Smallville (R)		Charmed		**One Tree Hill**		Local programming	
The WB	Winter	Smallville (R)		Charmed		The Surreal Life		Local programming	
The WB	Spring	Smallville (R)		Charmed		High School Reunion		Local programming	
The WB	Late spring	**Steve Harvey's Big Time Challenge** (R)		Charmed (R)				Local programming	
The WB	Summer	**Steve Harvey's Big Time Challenge** (R)		Charmed (R)				Local programming	

NOTE: On Fox, The Ortegas was supposed to air at 8:30-9, but it was cancelled.

== Monday ==
Network		8:00 PM	8:30 PM	9:00 PM	9:30 PM	10:00 PM	10:30 PM
ABC	Fall	**Primetime Monday**		Monday Night Football (#9/11.2) (Tied with Everybody Loves Raymond)			
ABC	Winter	The ABC Monday Night Movie					
ABC	Summer	My Wife & Kids	George Lopez	According to Jim	**Hope & Faith**	**Weddings Gone Wacky, Wonderful & Wild: Anything for Love**	
CBS		Yes, Dear	Still Standing (#26/7.7) (Tied with Judging Amy)	Everybody Loves Raymond (#9/11.2) (Tied with Monday Night Football)	**Two and a Half Men** (#14/9.9) (Tied with My Big Fat Obnoxious Fiance)	CSI: Miami (#8/11.9)	
Fox	Fall	The Next Joe Millionaire		**Skin**		Local Programming	
Fox	December	Fox Night at the Movies				Local Programming	
Fox	Winter	American Idol		**My Big Fat Obnoxious Fiance** (#14/9.9) (Tied with Two and a Half Men)		Local Programming	
Fox	March	That '70s Show (R)	**Cracking Up**	**Forever Eden**		Local Programming	
Fox	Follow Up	The Bernie Mac Show	**Cracking Up**	That '70s Show (R)		Local Programming	
Fox	Spring	The Bernie Mac Show		**The Swan**		Local Programming	
Fox	Summer	**North Shore**		**The Casino**		Local Programming	
NBC	Fall	Fear Factor (#22/7.9)		**Las Vegas** (#28/7.6)		Third Watch	
NBC	Follow Up	Fear Factor (#22/7.9)		**Las Vegas** (#28/7.6)		**Average Joe** (#29/7.4)	
NBC	Winter	Fear Factor (#22/7.9)		**Las Vegas** (#28/7.6)		**Average Joe** (#29/7.4)	
NBC	Spring	Fear Factor (#22/7.9)		**Las Vegas** (#28/7.6)		The Restaurant	
NBC	Summer	Fear Factor (#22/7.9)		For Love or Money		Who Wants to Marry My Dad?	
UPN	Fall	The Parkers	**Eve**	Girlfriends	Half & Half	Local Programming	
UPN	Winter	The Parkers	**Eve**	Girlfriends	Half & Half	Local Programming	
UPN	Spring	The Parkers	**Eve**	Girlfriends	Half & Half	Local Programming	
UPN	Summer	One on One	Half & Half	Girlfriends	Half & Half	Local Programming	
The WB	Fall	7th Heaven		Everwood		Local Programming	
The WB	Winter	7th Heaven		Everwood		Local Programming	
The WB	Spring	7th Heaven		Everwood		Local Programming	
The WB	Summer	7th Heaven		**Superstar USA**		Local Programming	
The WB	Follow Up	7th Heaven		**Summerland** (Repeats)		Local Programming	

== Tuesday ==
Network		8:00 PM	8:30 PM	9:00 PM	9:30 PM	10:00 PM	10:30 PM
ABC	Fall	8 Simple Rules	**I'm with Her**	According to Jim	Less than Perfect	NYPD Blue	
ABC	Winter	8 Simple Rules	**I'm with Her**	According to Jim	Less than Perfect	**Line of Fire**	
ABC	Follow Up	8 Simple Rules	**I'm with Her**	According to Jim	Less than Perfect	NYPD Blue	
ABC	Spring	8 Simple Rules	**I'm with Her**	According to Jim	**It's All Relative**	NYPD Blue	
ABC	Follow Up	8 Simple Rules	**I'm with Her**	According to Jim	Less than Perfect	NYPD Blue	
ABC	Summer	8 Simple Rules	**I'm with Her**	According to Jim	Less than Perfect	**NYPD 24/7**	
ABC	Mid-Summer	**Extreme Makeover: Home Edition**		According to Jim	Less than Perfect	**In the Jury Room**	
CBS	Fall	**Navy: NCIS** (#23/7.8) (Tied with The West Wing and the CBS Sunday Movie)		The Guardian		Judging Amy (#26/7.7) (Tied with Still Standing)	
CBS	Winter	**Navy: NCIS** (#23/7.8) (Tied with The West Wing and the CBS Sunday Movie)		The Guardian		Judging Amy (#26/7.7) (Tied with Still Standing)	
CBS	Spring	**Navy: NCIS** (#23/7.8) (Tied with The West Wing and the CBS Sunday Movie)		**Century City**		Judging Amy (#26/7.7) (Tied with Still Standing)	
CBS	Follow Up	**Navy: NCIS** (#23/7.8) (Tied with The West Wing and the CBS Sunday Movie)		The Guardian		Judging Amy (#26/7.7) (Tied with Still Standing)	
CBS	Summer	**Navy: NCIS** (#23/7.8) (Tied with The West Wing and the CBS Sunday Movie)		The Guardian		Judging Amy (#26/7.7) (Tied with Still Standing)	
CBS	Mid-Summer	**Navy: NCIS** (#23/7.8) (Tied with The West Wing and the CBS Sunday Movie)		Big Brother		The Amazing Race	
Fox	Fall	MLB Post-Season Games / World Series					
Fox	November	Encore programming		24		Local Programming	
Fox	December	That '70s Show (R)	**The Simple Life**	24		Local Programming	
Fox	Winter	American Idol (#2/14.9)		24		Local Programming	
Fox	Spring	American Idol (#2/14.9)		24		Local Programming	
Fox	Summer	The Bernie Mac Show	**Method & Red** (R)	**The Jury**		Local Programming	
Fox	Mid-Summer	**Trading Spouses: Meet Your New Mommy**		That '70s Show (R)	**Quintuplets** (R)	Local Programming	
NBC	Fall	**Whoopi**	**Happy Family**	Frasier (#30/7.3) (Tied with The King of Queens)	Good Morning, Miami	Law & Order: Special Victims Unit (#18/8.7)	
NBC	Winter	**The Tracy Morgan Show**	**Whoopi**	Frasier (#30/7.3) (Tied with The King of Queens)	**Happy Family**	Law & Order: Special Victims Unit (#18/8.7)	
NBC	Follow-up	**Whoopi**	**Happy Family**	Frasier (#30/7.3) (Tied with The King of Queens)	Scrubs	Law & Order: Special Victims Unit (#18/8.7)	
NBC	Spring	Fear Factor		Frasier (#30/7.3) (Tied with The King of Queens)	Scrubs	Law & Order: Special Victims Unit (#18/8.7)	
NBC	Summer	**Next Action Star**		Last Comic Standing		Law & Order: Special Victims Unit (#18/8.7)	
NBC	Mid-Summer	Scrubs	**Happy Family**	Last Comic Standing		Law & Order: Special Victims Unit (#18/8.7)	
UPN	Fall	One on One	**All of Us**	**Rock Me Baby**	**The Mullets**	Local Programming	
UPN	Follow-up	One on One	**All of Us**	**Rock Me Baby**	Girlfriends (Repeats)	Local Programming	
UPN	Winter	One on One	**All of Us**	America's Next Top Model 2		Local Programming	
UPN	Spring	One on One	**All of Us**	**Rock Me Baby**	One on One	Local Programming	
UPN	Summer	**All of Us**	**Eve**	America's Next Top Model		Local Programming	
UPN	August	**All of Us**	**Eve**	**The Player**		Local Programming	
The WB	Fall	Gilmore Girls		**One Tree Hill**		Local Programming	
The WB	Winter	Gilmore Girls		**One Tree Hill**		Local Programming	
The WB	Spring	Gilmore Girls		High School Reunion		Local Programming	
The WB	Follow Up	Gilmore Girls		**One Tree Hill**		Local Programming	
The WB	Summer	Gilmore Girls		**Summerland**		Local Programming	

NOTE: On The WB, Fearless was supposed to have started in the Fall at 9–10, but it was delayed to midseason, then it was cancelled both due to production difficulties.

== Wednesday ==
Network		8:00 PM	8:30 PM	9:00 PM	9:30 PM	10:00 PM	10:30 PM
ABC	Fall	My Wife & Kids	**It's All Relative**	The Bachelor (#21/8.3) / The Bachelorette		**Karen Sisco**	
ABC	Winter	My Wife & Kids	**It's All Relative**	The Bachelor (#21/8.3) / The Bachelorette		Celebrity Mole: Yucatán	
ABC	Spring	My Wife & Kids	My Wife & Kids	Extreme Makeover		**Stephen King's Kingdom Hospital**	
ABC	Follow-up	My Wife & Kids	My Wife & Kids	The Bachelor (#21/8.3)		Extreme Makeover	
ABC	Summer	My Wife & Kids	My Wife & Kids	The Drew Carey Show	The Drew Carey Show	**The Ultimate Love Test**	
CBS	Fall	60 Minutes II		The King of Queens (#30/7.3) (Tied with Frasier)	Becker	**The Brotherhood of Poland, New Hampshire**	
CBS	Winter	60 Minutes II		The King of Queens (#30/7.3) (Tied with Frasier)	Becker	48 Hours Investigates	
CBS	Spring	60 Minutes II		The King of Queens (#30/7.3) (Tied with Frasier)	**The Stones**	48 Hours Investigates	
CBS	Follow Up	60 Minutes II		The King of Queens (#30/7.3) (Tied with Frasier)	Yes, Dear	48 Hours Investigates	
CBS	Summer	60 Minutes II		The King of Queens (#30/7.3) (Tied with Frasier)	Yes, Dear	48 Hours Investigates	
Fox	Fall	That '70s Show	**A Minute with Stan Hooper**	**The O.C.**		Local Programming	
Fox	December	That '70s Show	**The Simple Life**	**The O.C.**		Local Programming	
Fox	Winter	That '70s Show	**The Simple Life**	**The O.C.**		Local Programming	
Fox	February	That '70s Show	American Idol (#3/14.1)	**The O.C.**		Local Programming	
Fox	Spring	That '70s Show	American Idol (#3/14.1)	**The O.C.**		Local Programming	
Fox	Summer	That '70s Show	**Quintuplets**	**The Simple Life**	**Method & Red**	Local Programming	
NBC	Fall	Ed		The West Wing (#23/7.8) (Tied with the CBS Sunday Movie and Navy: NCIS)		Law & Order (#12/10.8)	
NBC	Winter	**The Apprentice** (Repeats)		The West Wing (#23/7.8) (Tied with the CBS Sunday Movie and Navy: NCIS)		Law & Order (#12/10.8)	
NBC	Spring	Third Watch		The West Wing (#23/7.8) (Tied with the CBS Sunday Movie and Navy: NCIS)		Law & Order (#12/10.8)	
NBC	Summer	**Next Action Star**		Law & Order		Law & Order (#12/10.8)	
UPN	Fall	Star Trek: Enterprise		**Jake 2.0**		Local Programming	
UPN	Winter	Star Trek: Enterprise		America's Next Top Model (Repeats)		Local Programming	
UPN	March	**Game Over**	**The Mullets**	Star Trek: Enterprise		Local Programming	
UPN	Spring	**Game Over**	**The Mullets**	Star Trek: Enterprise		Local Programming	
UPN	April	Star Trek: Enterprise		**I'm Still Alive**		Local Programming	
UPN	Summer	Star Trek: Enterprise		Star Trek: Enterprise		Local Programming	
UPN	Mid-Summer	**Amish in the City**		**The Player**		Local Programming	
The WB	Fall	Smallville		Angel		Local Programming	
The WB	Winter	Smallville		Angel		Local Programming	
The WB	Spring	Smallville		Angel		Local Programming	
The WB	Summer	Flix from the Frog				Local Programming	
The WB	Mid-Summer	Smallville		Smallville		Local Programming	

== Thursday ==
Network		8:00 PM	8:30 PM	9:00 PM	9:30 PM	10:00 PM	10:30 PM
ABC	Fall	**Threat Matrix**		Extreme Makeover		Primetime	
ABC	Winter	**Threat Matrix**		Extreme Makeover		Primetime	
ABC	February	Extreme Makeover		Extreme Makeover		Primetime	
ABC	Spring	**Extreme Makeover: Home Edition** (Repeats)		**Stephen King's Kingdom Hospital**		Primetime	
ABC	Summer	Whose Line Is It Anyway?	Whose Line Is It Anyway?	**Stephen King's Kingdom Hospital**		Primetime	
ABC	Mid-Summer	Extreme Makeover		Extreme Makeover		Primetime	
CBS	Fall	Survivor: Pearl Islands (#7/12.3)		CSI: Crime Scene Investigation (#1/15.9)		Without a Trace (#11/11.1)	
CBS	Winter	CSI: Miami (Repeats)		CSI: Crime Scene Investigation (#1/15.9)		Without a Trace (#11/11.1)	
CBS	Spring	Survivor: All-Stars (#7/12.3)		CSI: Crime Scene Investigation (#1/15.9)		Without a Trace (#11/11.1)	
CBS	Summer	**Joan of Arcadia**		CSI: Crime Scene Investigation (#1/15.9)		Without a Trace (#11/11.1)	
CBS	Mid-Summer	Big Brother		CSI: Crime Scene Investigation (#1/15.9)		Without a Trace (#11/11.1)	
Fox	Fall	MLB Post-Season Games / World Series					
Fox	November	**Tru Calling**		Various Encore Programming		Local Programming	
Fox	December	**Tru Calling**		**The Simple Life** (Repeats)	**The Simple Life** (Repeats)	Local Programming	
Fox	Winter	**Tru Calling**		**The Simple Life** (Repeats)	**The Simple Life** (Repeats)	Local Programming	
Fox	Mid-January	**Tru Calling**		**My Big Fat Obnoxious Fiance** (Repeats)		Local Programming	
Fox	Spring	**Tru Calling**		Various Encore Programming		Local Programming	
Fox	Summer	**North Shore**		**Tru Calling**		Local Programming	
Fox	Mid-Summer	Fox Night at the Movies				Local Programming	
NBC	Fall	Friends (#4/13.6)	Scrubs	Will & Grace (#13/10.4)	**Coupling**	ER (#6/12.9)	
NBC	November	Friends (#4/13.6)	Good Morning, Miami	Will & Grace (#13/10.4)	Scrubs	ER (#6/12.9)	
NBC	Winter	Friends (#4/13.6)	Will & Grace (#13/10.4)	**The Apprentice** (#5/13.0)		ER (#6/12.9)	
NBC	Spring	Friends (#4/13.6)	Frasier	Will & Grace (#13/10.4)	Scrubs	ER (#6/12.9)	
NBC	Summer	Friends (#4/13.6)	**Come to Papa**	Will & Grace (#13/10.4)	Scrubs	ER (#6/12.9)	
NBC	Mid-Summer	Will & Grace	Scrubs	Last Comic Standing		ER (#6/12.9)	
UPN		WWE SmackDown				Local Programming	
The WB	Fall	**Steve Harvey's Big Time Challenge**	The Jamie Kennedy Experiment	What I Like About You	**Run of the House**	Local Programming	
The WB	Winter	**Steve Harvey's Big Time Challenge**	**All About the Andersons**	The Jamie Kennedy Experiment	**Run of the House**	Local Programming	
The WB	Follow Up	**Steve Harvey's Big Time Challenge**	**All About the Andersons**	The Surreal Life		Local Programming	
The WB	Spring	**Steve Harvey's Big Time Challenge**	**Like Family**	The Jamie Kennedy Experiment	The Jamie Kennedy Experiment	Local Programming	
The WB	Follow Up	Flix from the Frog				Local Programming	
The WB	Summer	Pepsi Smash		The Jamie Kennedy Experiment	Reba	Local Programming	
The WB	Mid-Summer	**Blue Collar TV**	Reba	**Blue Collar TV**	Reba	Local Programming	
The WB	Follow Up	**Blue Collar TV**	Reba	**Studio 7**		Local Programming	

NOTE: On Fox, The O.C. was supposed to air at 9-10 after Tru Calling, but at the last minute stick with repeats.

== Friday ==
Network		8:00 PM	8:30 PM	9:00 PM	9:30 PM	10:00 PM	10:30 PM
ABC	Fall	George Lopez	**Married to the Kellys**	**Hope & Faith**	Life with Bonnie	20/20	
ABC	Winter	George Lopez	**Married to the Kellys**	**Hope & Faith**	Life with Bonnie	20/20	
ABC	Spring	George Lopez	**The Big House**	**Hope & Faith**	Life with Bonnie	**The D.A.**	
ABC	Follow-up	George Lopez	**The Big House**	**Hope & Faith**	**Married to the Kellys**	20/20	
ABC	Summer	George Lopez	**Married to the Kellys**	**Hope & Faith**	Life with Bonnie	20/20	
ABC	Mid-Summer	George Lopez	8 Simple Rules	**Hope & Faith**	Less than Perfect	20/20	
CBS	Fall	**Joan of Arcadia**		JAG		**The Handler**	
CBS	Winter	**Joan of Arcadia**		JAG		**The Handler**	
CBS	Spring	**Joan of Arcadia**		JAG		CSI: Miami (Repeats)	
CBS	Summer	**Joan of Arcadia**		JAG		48 Hours	
Fox	Fall	Wanda at Large	**Luis**	Boston Public		Local Programming	
Fox	Follow-up	**Fox Friday Night Movie**				Local Programming	
Fox	Winter	**Totally Outrageous Behavior**	**World's Craziest Videos**	Boston Public		Local Programming	
Fox	Spring	Boston Public		**Wonderfalls**		Local Programming	
Fox	Mid-spring	**Playing It Straight**		**Wonderfalls**		Local Programming	
Fox	Follow-up	**Totally Outrageous Behavior**	**World's Craziest Videos**	**Forever Eden**		Local Programming	
Fox	May	**Fox Friday Night Movie**				Local Programming	
Fox	Summer	The Bernie Mac Show	**Method & Red**	**The Jury**		Local Programming	
NBC	Fall	**Miss Match**		Dateline NBC		Boomtown	
NBC	Follow-up	Dateline NBC		**Miss Match**		Third Watch	
NBC	Winter	Dateline NBC		Ed		Third Watch	
NBC	Spring	Dateline NBC				Third Watch	
NBC	Summer	Dateline NBC				**Las Vegas**	
UPN	Fall	UPN's Night at the Movies				Local Programming	
UPN	Winter	UPN's Night at the Movies				Local Programming	
UPN	Spring	**Game Over**	**All of Us**	Star Trek: Enterprise		Local Programming	
UPN	Follow-up	UPN's Night at the Movies				Local Programming	
UPN	Mid-Summer	Star Trek: Enterprise		**Amish in the City**		Local Programming	
The WB	Fall	Reba	**Like Family**	Grounded for Life	**All About the Andersons**	Local Programming	
The WB	Winter	Reba	What I Like About You	Grounded for Life	**Like Family**	Local Programming	
The WB	Spring	Reba	What I Like About You	Grounded for Life	**The Help**	Local Programming	
The WB	Follow-up	Reba	What I Like About You	Grounded for Life	**Run of the House**	Local Programming	
The WB	Summer	What I Like About You	Grounded for Life	Reba	Reba	Local Programming	
The WB	Mid-Summer	What I Like About You	Grounded for Life	Reba	**Blue Collar TV**	Local Programming	

== Saturday ==
Network		8:00 p.m.	8:30 p.m.	9:00 p.m.	9:30 p.m.	10:00 p.m.	10:30 p.m.
ABC	Fall	The Wonderful World of Disney				L.A. Dragnet	
ABC	Winter	The Wonderful World of Disney				America's Funniest Home Videos (R)	
ABC	Spring	The Wonderful World of Disney				America's Funniest Home Videos (R)	
ABC	Summer	The Wonderful World of Disney				Whose Line Is It Anyway?	Whose Line Is It Anyway? (R)
CBS	Fall	48 Hours Investigates		Hack		The District	
CBS	Winter	Star Search		Hack		The District	
CBS	Spring	CBS Saturday Night Movie				The District	
CBS	Summer	The Amazing Race (R)		Big Brother		Various programming	
Fox		COPS	COPS (R)	America's Most Wanted		Local programming	
NBC	Fall	NBC Saturday Night Movie				Law & Order: Special Victims Unit (R)	
NBC	Winter	**The Tracy Morgan Show**	**Whoopi** (R)	Law & Order (R)		Law & Order: Special Victims Unit (R)	
NBC	Spring	NBC Saturday Night Movie				Law & Order: Special Victims Unit (R)	
NBC	Summer	NBC Saturday Night Movie				Law & Order: Crime & Punishment	

== By network ==
=== ABC ===
**Returning series**

- 8 Simple Rules
- 20/20
- The ABC Monday Night Movie
- According to Jim
- Alias
- America's Funniest Home Videos
- The Bachelor
- The Bachelorette
- L.A. Dragnet
- The Drew Carey Show
- Extreme Makeover
- George Lopez
- Less than Perfect
- Life with Bonnie
- The Mole
- Monday Night Football
- My Wife and Kids
- NYPD Blue
- The Practice
- Primetime
- Whose Line Is It Anyway?
- The Wonderful World of Disney

**New series**

- **10-8: Officers on Duty** *
- **The Big House** *
- **The D.A.** *
- **Extreme Makeover: Home Edition** *
- **Hope & Faith**
- **I'm with Her**
- **In the Jury Room** *
- **It's All Relative**
- **Karen Sisco**
- **Kingdom Hospital** *
- **Line of Fire** *
- **Married to the Kellys**
- **NYPD 24/7** *
- **Primetime Monday**
- **Threat Matrix**
- **The Ultimate Love Test** *
- **Weddings Gone Wacky, Wonderful & Wild: Anything for Love** *

**Not returning from 2002-03**

- ABC Saturday Movie of the Week
- ABC Thursday Night Movie
- The Family
- Lost at Home
- MDs
- Miracles
- Push, Nevada
- Regular Joe
- That Was Then
- Veritas: The Quest

=== CBS ===
**Returning series**

- 48 Hours
- 60 Minutes
- 60 Minutes II
- The Amazing Race
- Becker
- Big Brother
- CBS Sunday Movie
- CSI: Crime Scene Investigation
- CSI: Miami
- The District
- Everybody Loves Raymond
- The Guardian
- Hack
- JAG
- Judging Amy
- The King of Queens
- Still Standing
- Star Search
- Survivor
- Without a Trace
- Yes, Dear

**New series**

- **The Brotherhood of Poland, New Hampshire**
- **Century City** *
- **Cold Case**
- **The Handler**
- **Joan of Arcadia**
- **NCIS**
- **The Stones** *
- **Two and a Half Men**

**Not returning from 2002-03**

- The Agency
- Baby Bob
- Bram & Alice
- Charlie Lawrence
- My Big Fat Greek Life
- Presidio Med
- Queens Supreme
- Robbery Homicide Division
- Touched by an Angel

=== Fox ===
Returning series:

- 24
- American Idol
- America's Most Wanted
- The Bernie Mac Show
- Boston Public
- Cops
- Fox Night at the Movies
- Joe Millionaire
- King of the Hill
- Malcolm in the Middle
- Oliver Beene
- The Simpsons
- That '70s Show
- Wanda at Large

New series:

- **Arrested Development**
- **The Casino** *
- **Cracking Up** *
- **Forever Eden** *
- **Fox Friday Night Movie**
- **The Jury** *
- **Luis**
- **Method & Red** *
- **A Minute with Stan Hooper**
- **My Big Fat Obnoxious Fiance** *
- **The O.C.**
- **Playing It Straight** *
- **Quintuplets** *
- **The Simple Life** *
- **Skin**
- **The Swan** *
- **Totally Outrageous Behavior**
- **Tru Calling**
- **Wonderfalls** *

Not returning from 2002-03:

- 30 Seconds to Fame
- Andy Richter Controls the Universe
- Anything for Love
- American Juniors
- Cedric the Entertainer Presents
- Fastlane
- Firefly
- Futurama (revived and moved to Comedy Central in 2008)
- Girls Club
- The Grubbs
- John Doe
- Keen Eddie
- Married by America
- Mr. Personality
- Paradise Hotel (revived in 2018–19)
- The Pitts
- Stupid Behavior Caught on Tape
- Temptation Island (revived in 2019 on USA)

=== NBC ===
Returning series:

- American Dreams
- Boomtown
- Crime & Punishment
- Crossing Jordan
- Dateline NBC
- Ed
- ER
- Fear Factor
- Frasier
- For Love or Money
- Friends
- Good Morning, Miami
- Last Comic Standing
- Law & Order
- Law & Order: Criminal Intent
- Law & Order: Special Victims Unit
- The Restaurant
- Scrubs
- Third Watch
- The West Wing
- Who Wants to Marry My Dad?
- Will & Grace

New series:

- **The Apprentice** *
- **Average Joe**
- **Come to Papa** *
- **Coupling**
- **Happy Family**
- **Las Vegas**
- **The Lyon's Den**
- **Miss Match**
- **Next Action Star** *
- **The Tracy Morgan Show** *
- **Whoopi**

Not returning from 2002-03:

- America's Most Talented Kid
- A.U.S.A.
- Dog Eat Dog
- Fame
- Hidden Hills
- Hunter
- In-Laws
- Just Shoot Me!
- Kingpin
- Let's Make a Deal
- Meet My Folks
- Mister Sterling
- Providence
- Race to the Altar
- Watching Ellie

=== UPN ===
**Returning series**

- America's Next Top Model
- Girlfriends
- Half & Half
- One on One
- The Parkers
- Star Trek: Enterprise
- UPN's Night at the Movies
- WWE SmackDown

**New series**

- **All of Us**
- **Amish in the City** *
- **Eve**
- **Game Over** *
- **I'm Still Alive** *
- **Jake 2.0**
- **The Mullets**
- **The Player** *
- **Rock Me Baby**

**Not returning from 2002-03**

- Abby
- Buffy the Vampire Slayer
- Haunted
- Platinum
- The Twilight Zone

=== The WB ===
**Returning series**

- 7th Heaven
- Angel
- Charmed
- Everwood
- Flix from the Frog
- Gilmore Girls
- Grounded for Life
- High School Reunion
- The Jamie Kennedy Experiment
- Reba
- Smallville
- The Surreal Life
- What I Like About You

**New series**

- **All About the Andersons**
- **Blue Collar TV**
- **The Help**
- **One Tree Hill**
- **Run of the House**
- **Steve Harvey's Big Time Challenge**
- **Studio 7** *
- **Summerland** *
- **Superstar USA** *
- **Tarzan**

**Not returning from 2002-03**

- Birds of Prey
- Black Sash
- Dawson's Creek
- Do Over
- Family Affair
- Greetings from Tucson
- The O'Keefes
- On the Spot
- Off Centre
- Sabrina the Teenage Witch

Note: The * indicates that the program was introduced in midseason.

== Renewals and cancellations ==
=== Renewals ===
==== ABC ====
- 8 Simple Rules—Renewed for the 2004–2005 season.
- According to Jim—Renewed for the 2004–2005 season.
- Alias—Renewed for the 2004–2005 season.
- George Lopez—Renewed for the 2004–2005 season.
- Hope & Faith—Renewed for the 2004–2005 season.
- Less than Perfect—Renewed for the 2004–2005 season.
- My Wife and Kids—Renewed for the 2004–2005 season.
- NYPD Blue—Renewed for the 2004–2005 season.

==== CBS ====
- Cold Case—Renewed for the 2004–2005 season.
- CSI: Crime Scene Investigation—Renewed for the 2004–2005 season.
- CSI: Miami—Renewed for the 2004–2005 season.
- Everybody Loves Raymond—Renewed for the 2004–2005 season.
- JAG—Renewed for the 2004–2005 season.
- Joan of Arcadia—Renewed for the 2004–2005 season.
- Judging Amy—Renewed for the 2004–2005 season.
- The King of Queens—Renewed for the 2004–2005 season.
- NCIS—Renewed for the 2004–2005 season.
- Still Standing—Renewed for the 2004–2005 season.
- Two and a Half Men—Renewed for the 2004–2005 season.
- Without a Trace—Renewed for the 2004–2005 season.
- Yes, Dear—Renewed for the 2004–2005 season.

==== Fox ====
- 24—Renewed for the 2004–2005 season.
- Arrested Development—Renewed for the 2004–2005 season.
- The Bernie Mac Show—Renewed for the 2004–2005 season.
- King of the Hill—Renewed for the 2004–2005 season.
- Malcolm in the Middle—Renewed for the 2004–2005 season.
- The O.C.—Renewed for the 2004–2005 season.
- The Simpsons—Renewed for the 2004–2005 season.
- That '70s Show—Renewed for the 2004–2005 season.
- Tru Calling—Renewed for the 2004–2005 season.

==== NBC ====
- American Dreams—Renewed for the 2004–2005 season.
- Crossing Jordan—Renewed for the 2004–2005 season.
- ER—Renewed for the 2004–2005 season.
- Las Vegas—Renewed for the 2004–2005 season.
- Law & Order—Renewed for the 2004–2005 season.
- Law & Order: Criminal Intent—Renewed for the 2004–2005 season.
- Law & Order: Special Victims Unit—Renewed for the 2004–2005 season.
- Scrubs—Renewed for the 2004–2005 season.
- Third Watch—Renewed for the 2004–2005 season.
- The West Wing—Renewed for the 2004–2005 season.
- Will & Grace—Renewed for the 2004–2005 season.

==== UPN ====
- All of Us—Renewed for the 2004–2005 season.
- Eve—Renewed for the 2004–2005 season.
- Girlfriends—Renewed for the 2004–2005 season.
- Half & Half—Renewed for the 2004–2005 season.
- One on One—Renewed for the 2004–2005 season.
- Star Trek: Enterprise—Renewed for the 2004–2005 season.

==== The WB ====
- 7th Heaven—Renewed for the 2004–2005 season.
- Charmed—Renewed for the 2004–2005 season.
- Everwood—Renewed for the 2004–2005 season.
- Gilmore Girls—Renewed for the 2004–2005 season.
- Grounded for Life—Renewed for the 2004–2005 season.
- One Tree Hill—Renewed for the 2004–2005 season.
- Reba—Renewed for the 2004–2005 season.
- Smallville—Renewed for the 2004–2005 season.
- Summerland—Renewed for the 2004–2005 season.
- What I Like About You—Renewed for the 2004–2005 season.

=== Cancellations/series endings ===
==== ABC ====
- 10-8: Officers on Duty—Canceled after one season.
- The Big House—Canceled after one season.
- The D.A.—Canceled after one season.
- The Drew Carey Show—Ended after nine seasons.
- I'm with Her—Canceled after one season.
- It's All Relative—Canceled after one season.
- Karen Sisco—Canceled after one season.
- Kingdom Hospital—Canceled after one season.
- Life with Bonnie—Canceled after two seasons.
- Line of Fire—Canceled after one season.
- Married to the Kellys—Canceled after one season.
- The Practice—Ended after eight seasons.
- Threat Matrix—Canceled after one season.

==== CBS ====
- Becker—Ended after six seasons.
- The Brotherhood of Poland, New Hampshire—Canceled after one season.
- Century City—Canceled after one season.
- The District—Ended after four seasons.
- The Guardian—Ended after three seasons.
- Hack—Canceled after two seasons.
- The Handler—Canceled after one season.
- The Stones—Canceled after one season.

==== Fox ====
- A Minute with Stan Hooper—Canceled after one season.
- Boston Public—Ended after four seasons.
- Cracking Up—Canceled after one season.
- Futurama—Moved to Comedy Central in 2008.
- Luis—Canceled after one season.
- Method & Red—Canceled after one season.
- Oliver Beene—Canceled after two seasons.
- Skin—Canceled after one season.
- Wonderfalls—Canceled after one season.

==== NBC ====
- Boomtown—Canceled after two seasons.
- Come to Papa—Canceled after one season.
- Coupling—Canceled after one season.
- Ed—Ended after four seasons.
- Frasier—Ended after eleven seasons.
- Friends—Ended after ten seasons.
- Good Morning Miami—Canceled after two seasons.
- Happy Family—Canceled after one season.
- The Lyon's Den—Canceled after one season.
- Miss Match—Canceled after one season.
- The Tracy Morgan Show—Canceled after one season.
- Whoopi—Canceled after one season.

==== UPN ====
- Game Over—Canceled after one season.
- Jake 2.0—Canceled after one season.
- The Mullets—Canceled after one season.
- The Parkers—Ended after five seasons.
- Rock Me Baby—Canceled after one season.

==== The WB ====
- All About the Andersons—Canceled after one season.
- Angel—Ended after five seasons.
- The Help—Canceled after one season.
- Like Family—Canceled after one season.
- Run of the House—Canceled after one season.
- Tarzan—Canceled after one season.
