= Mose Gingerich =

American filmmaker

Mose J. Gingerich is an American documentary-maker and the author of Amish fiction murder/mystery novels. Gingerich was born in an Old Order Amish community in Greenwood, Wisconsin.

== Early years ==
Gingerich was born on July 27, 1979, and was the 9th of 13 children. He raised on a 255-acre farm and worked on the farm from a young age. He developed a love for reading as an escape from reality. Books such as Tom Sawyer, Huckleberry Finn, Little Men, Little Women, Big Smoke Mountain, and Heidi influenced his early childhood.

In his early teens, Gingerich lived in six different Amish communities in Wisconsin, Iowa, Missouri, and Kansas. At the age of 19 he became a schoolteacher, teaching grades 1-8 in a one-room schoolhouse for four years. On July 3, 2002, after Gingerich finished his fourth year of teaching, he left the Amish community. He was banned from further contact with his family and community.

== Career ==
=== Television ===
==== Amish in the City ====
In 2004, just over a year after Gingerich left the Amish, he took an opportunity to be on the reality show Amish in the City, televised on UPN. The show featured six city kids and five ex-Amish kids trying to co-exist in a mansion in the middle of the Hollywood Hills. It was the first major television project to focus on Amish people and ran for 10 episodes. As part of this experience, he made appearances on several late-night shows to help promote Amish in the City, including Jimmy Kimmel Live, Good Morning America and Live with Regis and Kelly, as well as several radio shows.

==== Amish at the Altar and Amish Out of Order ====
In 2009 and 2010, Gingerich shot and produced two documentaries with Stick Figure Productions. Both aired by the National Geographic Channel: Amish at the Altar and Amish Out of the Order. Amish at the Altar featured Eli and Mary Gingerich, a couple who had been married Amish but chose to leave, renewing their wedding vows in the outside world. Amish: Out of the Order featured Gingerich, a group of his close ex-Amish friends, and the life they are leading in Columbia, Missouri. The focus of the film was Gingerich’s place as a leader within the ex-Amish community, and his practical work helping others with housing, cars, driver's licenses and jobs.

=== Construction and sales ===
For the first eight years after leaving the community, he worked in construction, and for six of those years, owned his own construction company, often employing ex-Amish youth who were looking to acclimate into the outside world. He left construction in 2010 for health reasons. He then sold cars in Columbia, Missouri, for six years. When the dealership was sold in 2016, Gingerich started truck driving, delivering freight coast to coast.

=== Writing ===
In 2021, Gingerich published Shadows We Remain, a fiction novel and the first in the Caroline Creek Series.

In 2022, Gingerich published Caroline Creek Chaos, the second Caroline Creek novel.

He also maintains a blog on his website.

== Personal life ==
Gingerich lives in mid-Missouri with his wife and three children.

== In popular culture ==
The character of Mose Schrute from The Office was named for, and inspired by, Mose Gingerich.
