= Marc Anthony Collection =

American lifestyle brand

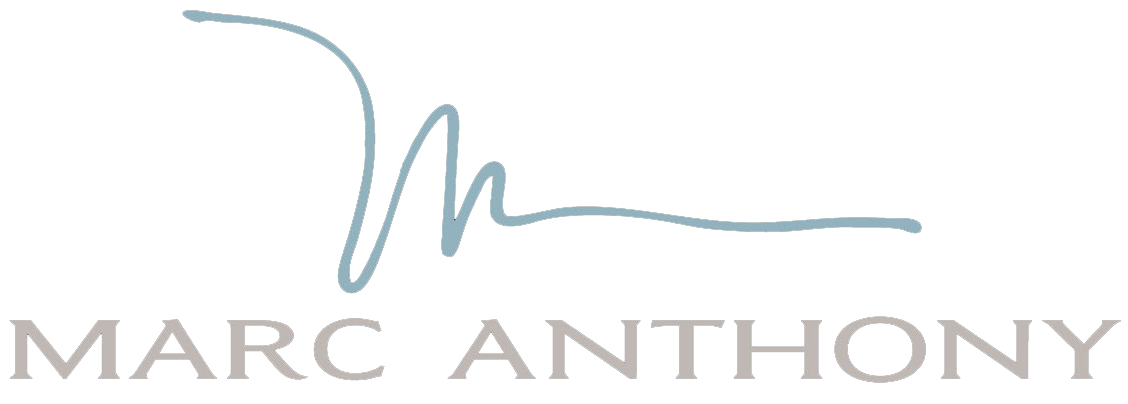
- Industry: Retail
- Founded: 2010
- Headquarters: United States
- Key people: Marc Anthony
- Products: Sportswear, dress shirts, neckwear, accessories, suit separates, sport coats and shoes
- Website: Online store

The Marc Anthony Collection is an American lifestyle brand created by American recording artist Marc Anthony that was sold exclusively at Kohl's department stores and on Kohls website: Kohls.com. Presently his collection has been discontinued at Kohl's. In November 2010, Kohl's announced a partnership with Anthony and his then-wife Jennifer Lopez. Originally marketed as "the first celebrity couple to simultaneously design collections for one retailer", following Anthony and Lopez's divorce, the lines were marked as two separate brands. The Marc Anthony Collection consists of sportswear, dress shirts, neckwear, accessories, suit separates, sport coats, and shoes, while the Jennifer Lopez Collection includes contemporary sportswear, dresses, handbags, jewelry, shoes, and sleepwear along with a home collection of bedding and towels.

== Background ==
Anthony became interested in fashion after Tommy Hilfiger called him and discussed the importance of clothing. Anthony said, "I realized that for me it was more important to be comfortable in clothes and look cool, but to feel comfortable in it". Anthony added that he concentrated on the attention to detail in his line, which he said is for anybody who's into "great quality clothes at a cheap price point".

== Development ==
As opposed to other projects where the turn around for the final product was fast, this project was something we grew into and nurtured. There wasn't as much pressure and it was effortless. We could talk about it everyday [sic], ask for each other's opinions, and just bounce ideas off of each other.

— Anthony on working on the line with Lopez

Anthony and Lopez's partnership with Kohl's was announced during a press conference at the London Hotel in Los Angeles, California on November 18, 2010. The deal was aimed at including men's and women's clothing, as well as homewares. Lopez's collection contained women's dresses, sportswear, handbags, and jewelry, while Anthony's contained men's dress shirts, ties, sports coats, and shoes. Kohl's expected "the his-and-hers line" to expand into home accessories over time. The new venture was expected to generate up to $3 billion in additional sales for Kohl's in its first year alone." When asked why he decided to do a line for Kohl's, Anthony stated that: "I've been approached in the past to create a line, but I never saw myself as a fashionista or designer. It wasn't until I met with Kohl's and understood their vision and it was in line with everything I felt. I wouldn't say it was about fashion, it was just good quality, well-made, practical clothing."

Following the couple's separation in July 2011, it was announced that the line would go forward as two separate clothing lines. A spokesperson told Women's Wear Daily that: "The Jennifer Lopez and Marc Anthony brands have always been positioned as two separate, distinctive collections that offer high-quality contemporary style for men and women, and we look forward to a successful September launch." Rick Darling, the president of LF USA, which is sub-licensing the brands to Kohl's exclusively, added: "We have two separate agreements with Jennifer and Marc and always intended to have separate lines. [Their split] doesn't impact the agreements in any way."

== Collections ==
=== Fall 2011 ===
The Marc Anthony Collection was launched at the Kohl's in the Newport Centre Mall in Jersey City on September 7, 2011. The debut of Anthony and Lopez's lines marked the biggest product launch in the retailer's history, according to CEO Kevin Mansell. To celebrate the launch of the Anthony and Lopez collections, Kohl's launched a Best Friends Getaway contest, offering fifteen winners a chance to "live it up with their best friend on an all-expense paid trip to New York City."

Prices range from $28 to $225. Of the collection, Anthony stated that it's "for anybody who wants to feel good in clothes." He was inspired to create the line after "years of having to wear clothing, in various situations, whether it be in public (or anywhere else)." He concluded: "It's just about how the clothes feel. You can wear cool, stylish clothes but they don't feel good. We made sure these clothes feel good. I'd wear them a billion percent [sic] of the time." Anthony said he had input throughout the whole designing process, "even though he doesn't have the technical skills to do things like create spec drawings."
