= Tommy Hilfiger =

American fashion designer (born 1951)

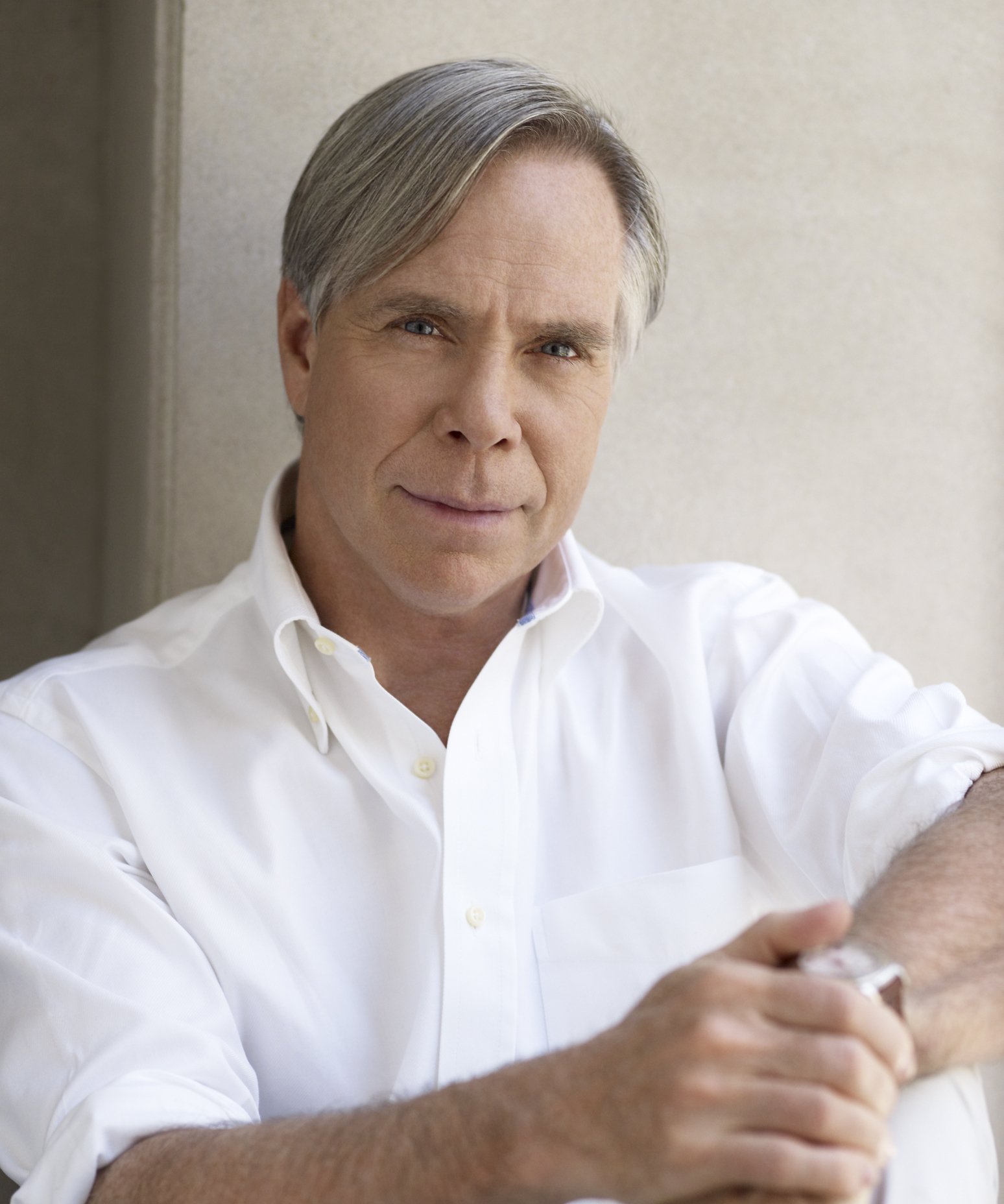
- Hilfiger in 2009
- Born: Thomas Jacob Hilfiger; March 24, 1951 (age 75); Elmira, New York, U.S.
- Occupation: Fashion designer
- Label: Tommy Hilfiger
- Spouses: Jayne Klopenstein (m. 1978; div. 1979); Susie Cirona (m. 1980; div. 2000); Dee Ocleppo (m. 2008)
- Website: tommy.com

Thomas Jacob Hilfiger (/ˈhɪlfɪɡər/ HIL-fig-ər; born March 24, 1951) is an American fashion designer and the founder of Tommy Hilfiger Corporation.

After starting his career by co-founding a chain of jeans/fashion stores called People's Place in upstate New York in the 1970s, he began designing preppy clothing for his own eponymous menswear line in the 1980s. The company later expanded into women's clothing and various luxury items such as perfumes and went public in 1992.

Hilfiger's collections are often influenced by the fashion of music subcultures and marketed in connection with the music industry, with celebrities such as American R&B artist Aaliyah in the 1990s. In 2005, contestants in the CBS reality show The Cut competed for a design job with Hilfiger in a similar fashion to The Apprentice. In 2006, Hilfiger sold his company for $1.6 billion to Apax Partners, who next sold it in 2010 to Phillips-Van Heusen for $3 billion. He remains the company's principal designer, leading the design teams and overseeing the entire creative process. In 2012, Hilfiger was awarded the Geoffrey Beene Lifetime Achievement Award from the Council of Fashion Designers of America.

== Early life ==
Hilfiger was born on March 24, 1951, in Elmira, New York, the second of nine children. Both of his parents were practicing Catholics. His father Richard was a watchmaker of Swiss-German descent, and his mother Virginia (née Gerrity) was a nurse of Irish descent. Hilfiger also claims direct descent from Gilbert Burns, brother of the Scottish poet Robert Burns. His paternal family originated from Safenwil, Canton of Aargau, Switzerland with the original spelling of his family name being Hilfiker and being Americanized after emigration by his ancestors.

Hilfiger has described his upbringing as very happy. He credits his parents with instilling a good work ethic and compassion for others. He has dyslexia. Hilfiger had an early interest in sports, fashion, and the music industry, a trend that ran in his family. One of his brothers, Andy Hilfiger, went on to work as a musician and designer, while Hilfiger's other brother, Billy Hilfiger, would join King Flux and other bands as a guitarist.

== Business and fashion career ==
Hilfiger graduated from the Elmira Free Academy high school in 1969. His parents wanted him to get a college education and pursue a traditional career, and for a time he attended GST BOCES Bush Campus in Elmira.

=== People's Place and early lines (1970s–1983) ===
Hilfiger spent the summer of 1969 working in a clothing store on Cape Cod, and afterwards he decided to use his life savings of $150 to open a clothing store in 1971 as People's Place. The first store was located in downtown Elmira in what is now the site of First Arena and had a hair salon, a record shop, and rock concerts in the basement. To stock the store, Hilfiger and a friend drove to New York City to buy clothing such as bell-bottoms, peasant blouses, and leather jackets. Unsatisfied with this, he began sketching his own designs, and would later write that "designing made me happier than anything I'd ever done. I knew from that early work that designing would be my life."

The People's Place went bankrupt in 1977. Hilfiger enrolled in classes on commerce and the business side of the fashion industry. After then moving to New York City and working for several different labels, he set up a company called Tommy Hill in 1979. One of his first clients was Jordache Jeans, and as Hilfiger's company expanded beyond denim, he spent time in India, learning more about his trade: "I would sit in the factory with my pile of sketches and watch them being made, tweaking as I went. There's no better design school in the world." In 1981 he founded the company 20th Century Survival, and the following year he founded Click Point, which designed women's clothing.

=== Founding Tommy Hilfiger Inc. (1984–1990s) ===
In 1984, Hilfiger was approached by businessman Mohan Murjani, to pursue his goal of designing and heading a men's sportswear line. Murjani backed the necessary investment for Hilfiger to establish his own brand. Later Hilfiger oversaw the design of the Coca-Cola clothing line for Murjani.

[Wanting to form my own eponymous line] came from a desire to create something that wasn't out there already. I was really in tune with the market—I knew what existed, and I wanted this to be different. Maybe it's the small-town boy in me, but I've always loved the prep school look, traditional Ivy League, and the clothes that sailors and jocks wear. I wanted to take these familiar old things and give them a more laid-back attitude, to make them modern and cool...[with Tommy Hilfiger Corporation in 1985], finally, I felt like I was doing work that felt natural, that felt good. The brand we were building felt so honest, so true to who I am, that it didn't feel like a struggle at all.

— Tommy Hilfiger in 2010

In 1985, he founded the Tommy Hilfiger Corporation with support from The Murjani Group. The new clothing line made its debut with a high-profile marketing campaign, for example setting up a large billboard in Times Square designed by George Lois. Hilfiger left Murjani International in 1989, with Silas Chou instead providing financial backing to the Hilfiger brand, and former executives of Ralph Lauren brought on board as executives of the newly formed company Tommy Hilfiger, Inc. The Tommy Hilfiger Corporation went public in 1992, introducing Hilfiger's signature menswear collection. Hilfiger was named Menswear Designer of the Year by the Council of Fashion Designers of America in 1995.

After licensing Pepe Jeans USA in 1995, in 1996, Tommy Hilfiger Inc. began distributing women's clothing. By the end of 1997 Hilfiger had opened his first store in Beverly Hills. This was followed by a store in London in 1998. Hilfiger was serving as the company's co-chairman by 1997, and that year he published his first book, titled All American: A Style Book.

=== Increased brand exposure (1990s–2004) ===
A professed lifelong fan of rock and roll, Hilfiger's collections are often influenced by the fashion of music subcultures. The clothes are also marketed in connection with the music industry, and as early as 1993 Hilfiger was an official sponsor for Pete Townshend's Psychoderelict tour. Hilfiger has also sponsored several musical events, including Sheryl Crow's If It Makes You Happy tour in 1997, Britney Spears' 1999 ...Baby One More Time Tour as main sponsor, and Lenny Kravitz's 1999 Freedom tour. By the mid-1990s, Hilfiger's style of clothing was popular with both the American "preppy" scene and as hip hop fashion. American R&B icon Aaliyah became the much-publicized spokesperson for Tommy Hilfiger Corporation in 1997.

Hilfiger had a cameo in the fashion spoof Zoolander in 2001, and from 2002 to 2006 Tommy Hilfiger Inc. owned the naming rights to the Tommy Hilfiger at Jones Beach Theatre venue. Largely due to declining sales in the early 2000s, Hilfiger began reworking the brand, striving to retain the designer brand exclusivity of the Hilfiger label by signing a deal to distribute the best-selling Hilfiger lines at Macy's only.

The Tommy Hilfiger Corporation continued to work closely with musicians into the 2000s, focusing on fragrances as well as clothes. Sweetface Fashion, which owns the J.Lo by Jennifer Lopez line, was bought out by Tommy Hilfiger in 2003. True Star, a fragrance endorsed by Hilfiger and released in 2004, featured Beyoncé as its poster girl. The Tommy Hilfiger Corporation company had revenues of approximately $1.8 billion, and 5,400 employees by 2004.

=== Media appearances and sale of clothing brand (2005–2011) ===
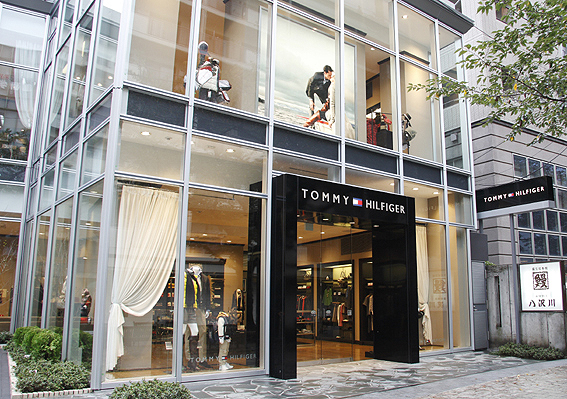
Exterior of a Tommy Hilfiger store in Tokyo, Japan, in 2008

In 2005, a CBS reality show called The Cut tracked the progress of sixteen contestants as they competed for a design job with Tommy Hilfiger and their own fashion line under Hilfiger's label. The show progressed in a similar fashion to Donald Trump's The Apprentice. After a final competition that involved setting up the display window for Macy's Herald Square location in New York, Hilfiger chose Chris Cortez as the "next great American designer."

In December 2005, Tommy Hilfiger sold the clothing brand for $1.6 billion, or $16.80 a share, to Apax Partners, a private investment company. The transaction was completed in May 2006. In 2008 Hilfiger, Rives, and Bar Refaeli co-hosted the Bravo special program Tommy Hilfiger Presents Ironic Iconic America. Based on the book Ironic Iconic America written by Hilfiger and designer George Lois, the program examined how pop culture has influenced American tastes and styles. In 2009 Hilfiger was a guest judge on an episode of Project Runway, and he presented the Best African Artist award to Akon at the 2010 World Music Awards.

In March 2010, Phillips-Van Heusen, owner of Calvin Klein and Izod, bought the Tommy Hilfiger brand from Apax Partners for $3 billion. The Tommy Hilfiger online and in-store ad campaign called "Meet The Hilfigers" began in August 2010 and ran through August 2011. In 2011, Hilfiger and a partner signed a contract to buy the Metropolitan Life Insurance Company Tower building for $170 million, planning to transform it into Hilfiger's first hotel, with luxury condos. Hilfiger backed off the project in September 2011. A guest judge on the finale of Project Runway: All Stars along with Neiman Marcus fashion director Ken Downing in 2012, shortly afterwards he served as a fashion consultant to contestants on season 11 of American Idol.

=== Recent years and memoir (2012–2016) ===
"One year, my brother Andy brought the sons and daughters of rock and Hollywood legends on a tour bus (including Mark Ronson, Kidada Jones, and Kate Hudson) and threw fashion shows all over the country... we did [runway shows at] Madison Square Garden with Bush playing live, Pharrell at Bryant Park, and Lenny Kravitz in Paris. We had Treach on the runway in London, with Kate Moss and Naomi Campbell dancing around him. I've dressed the Rolling Stones for [their 1998 "No Security"] tour, and working with Mick Jagger and the band was such a great experience."
— Tommy Hilfiger in 2010

Hilfiger was instrumental in the creation of the Marc Anthony Collection in 2012, as Marc Anthony had never been interested in the fashion business until Hilfiger called him and convinced him a line was worthwhile. In 2012, Hilfiger was awarded the Geoffrey Beene Lifetime Achievement Award from the Council of Fashion Designers of America. Global sales in retail for the brand in 2013 were US$6.4 billion, and $6.7 billion in 2014.

Hilfiger remains the company's principal designer, leading the design teams and overseeing the entire creative process. In 2016, he collaborated with model Gigi Hadid on clothing designs launching the TommyXGigi clothing collection. On February 8, 2017, the brand will hold its ready-to-wear show in Los Angeles, in the first time the brand will not be part of New York Fashion Week.

In January 2015, Hilfiger announced that he was working on his memoirs. The book was written chronologically over a year, with Hilfiger explaining "I was hesitant to write it, but thought I better do it now because someday I may forget." Co-writer Peter Knobler had full access to interview friends and family, with Hilfiger citing the candor of Diane von Furstenberg's memoirs as an inspiration. Calling the writing process "great therapy" and "interesting," Hilfiger asserted that he "wanted to give people a sneak peek of what goes on behind the curtain [of] how the fashion industry works." He read selections from the book in June 2016 at the Literacy Partners Evening of Readers and Gala Dinner Dance.

Hilfiger's memoir, American Dreamer: My Life in Fashion & Business, co-written with Peter Knobler, was published in November 2016. In a statement, Hilfiger described it as "a roadmap of the moments that have defined both my [40-year fashion career] and my personal life," and the book covers his childhood, his early business ventures, and his later life in fashion. With Kirkus Reviews calling it "an honest, straightforward, mostly entertaining autobiography," Hilfiger made an appearance for the book at the Miami Book Fair shortly after its release. American Dreamer appeared on the New York Times Best Sellers List in December 2016

== Charity work ==
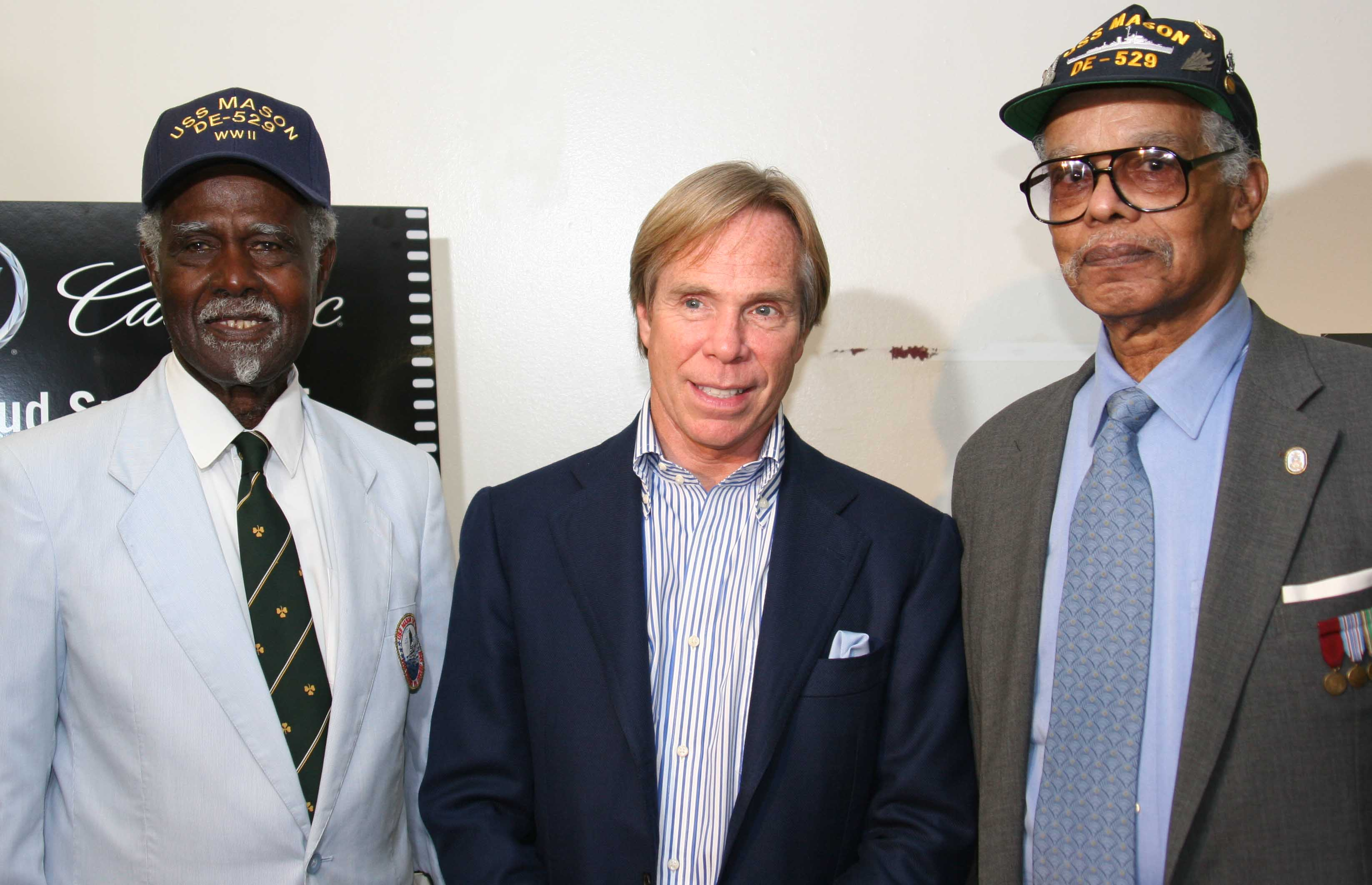
World War II veterans, Petty Officer 1st class Lorenzo A. DuFau, a former signalman, and Petty Officer 2nd class James W. Graham of USS Mason, with Tommy Hilfiger during the screening of Proud at the Apollo Theater in 2005

In 1995, Hilfiger launched The Tommy Hilfiger Corporate Foundation. With an emphasis on health, educational and cultural programs, the organization supports charities that focus on at-risk American youth. In 1998 Hilfiger was one of several sponsors along with Moet and Chandon, Christie's Auction House, and The Advocate of the charity LIFEbeat – The Music Industry Fights AIDS. He is personally involved in charities and causes such as Autism Speaks and the MLK, Jr. National Memorial Project Foundation, and he has served on the board of directors for The Fresh Air Fund, a New York-based group that helps underprivileged children attend summer camp. The Fresh Air Fund's Camp Pioneer program was renamed Camp Tommy in 1999, in honor of Hilfiger's patronage.

Since 2008, Hilfiger has designed limited-edition handbags in support Breast Health International (BHI), an international organization focused on finding a cure for breast cancer. A portion of the handbag sales proceeds is donated to BHI's Fund For Living program, with celebrity ambassadors appointed for each seasonal campaign. In 2013, Claudia Schiffer and Naomi Campbell modeled the BHI bag in a photoshoot with photographer Patrick Demarchelier.

Millennium Promise, a non-profit organization focused on eradicating extreme poverty, hunger and preventable disease in impoverished regions, classifies Hilfiger as a Millennium Promise MDG Global Leader, and in 2009 Hilfiger made a five-year $2 million commitment to Millennium Promise. The donation went towards relief efforts in a Ugandan city, with the aim of improving residents' access to necessities like clean water, education, and farming techniques.

In 2012, all philanthropic activities of The Tommy Hilfiger Corporate Foundation were renamed Tommy Cares, a wider-reaching global initiative that further integrates the brand's non-profit partnerships, charitable contributions, and employee involvement. On a global scale, Tommy Cares continues to support organizations such as Save the Children, the World Wildlife Fund, War Child, and Millennium Promise. Hilfiger and his wife are on the board of Autism Speaks as of 2012, and through the organization, Hilfiger became a sponsor of the Golden Door Film Festival in September 2014.

Hilfiger has continuously cited the important role inclusivity, diversity and self-expression have had in the brand's development and contributions to pop culture.

In 2016, Hilfiger also echoed his support for dressing Melania Trump, telling WWD that "any designer should be proud to dress her."

In 2020, Hilfiger sold his 22.4 acre estate in Greenwich, Connecticut, for $47.5 million.

== Recognition ==
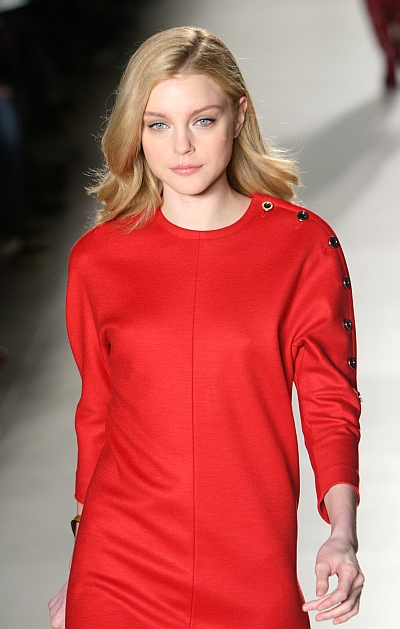
Jessica Stam wears Tommy Hilfiger on the runway in 2008.

The following is a selected list of awards and recognitions for Tommy Hilfiger:

- 1995: Council of Fashion Designers of America – Menswear Designer of the Year
- 1996: American Academy of Achievement – Golden Plate Award
- 1997: FiFi Awards – Men's Fragrance of the Year – Luxe, for the fragrance "Tommy"
- 1998: Parsons School of Design – Designer of the Year Award
- 1998: GQ Magazine – Designer of the Year for 'Men of the Year' issue
- 2000: FiFi Awards – Best Marketing Innovation of the Year, for Toiletries for Tommy's (American running series)
- 2002: GQ Germany – International Designer of the Year
- 2002: Drug Abuse Resistance Education – Future of America Award, for philanthropic efforts for American youth
- 2006: GQ Spain – Designer of the Year
- 2006: Harvard Foundation – Peter J. Gomes Humanitarian of the Year
- 2006: We Are Family Foundation – Visionary Award
- 2007: Hispanic Federation – Individual Achievement Award
- 2008: Women's Wear Daily – No. 1 Designer and No. 16 Brand in annual "100 List"
- 2009: UNESCO – UNESCO Support Award, for philanthropic efforts
- 2009: Marie Claire Magazine – Lifetime Achievement Award
- 2010: Pratt Institute – Legends Award
- 2012: Council of Fashion Designers of America – Geoffrey Beene Lifetime Achievement Award, presented by Anna Wintour
- 2015: Race To Erase MS – honored for commitment to finding a cure for MS

== Criticisms ==
Hilfiger has been criticized for having manufactured clothes in sweatshop conditions in the United States territory of Saipan in the Northern Mariana Islands. As a U.S. Commonwealth, clothes made there can be labeled "Made in the USA", but federal labor laws, including the minimum wage, do not apply. In March 2000, the company, along with other defendants, settled a class action suit brought by Saipanese garment workers, which had alleged mistreatment by over twenty large U.S. clothing manufacturers.

== Style and impact ==
The Tommy Hilfiger brand is an example of a designer label.

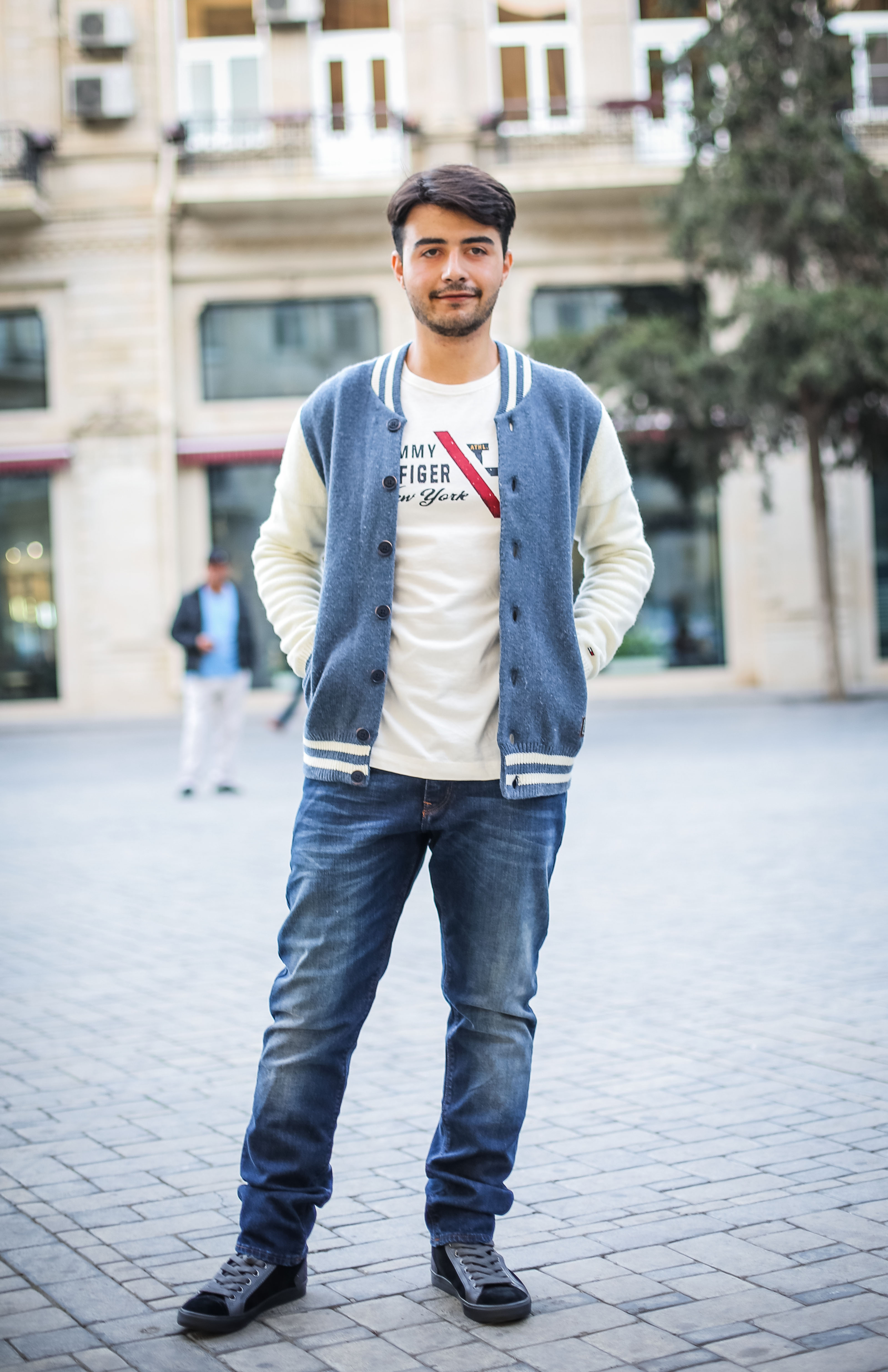
A Tommy Hilfiger customer in Azerbaijan wears the brand in 2013. His shirt displays a variation of the distinctive three-tone logo.

While Hilfiger's earliest designs drew on 1960s counterculture and fashion, since the 1980s his designs typically draw from classic American New England preppy styles. His initial lines for the Tommy Hilfiger Corporation were primarily designed to appeal to young men looking for designer clothing, and Tommy Hilfiger became one of the most prominent brands in 1990s sportswear, with Polo Ralph Lauren, Calvin Klein, Nautica, DKNY, and Donna Karan also popular. Each of these companies created distinctive wardrobes based upon stylish but wearable, comfortable and interchangeable multi-purpose clothes, all with a focus on luxury.

Hip hop fashion at large began incorporating the Hilfiger brand in the 1990s, and when Snoop Dogg wore a Hilfiger sweatshirt during an appearance on Saturday Night Live, it sold out of New York City stores the next day. Moreover, Hilfiger courted the new hip hop market, and rappers like Puffy and Coolio walked during his runways shows. Specific items like Tommy Hilfiger carpenter jeans became particularly popular, with the trademark logo displayed on the hammer loop.

Hilfiger continues to maintain multiple fashion lines, some focused on wearable "casual" clothes while others take on various haute couture commissions. Aside from the preppy styles of his youth, Hilfiger has also always been influenced by the style of a wide variety of American icons, including Grace Kelly, James Dean, Deborah Harry, Iggy Pop, Farrah Fawcett, Steve McQueen, Jackie and John F. Kennedy, and Andy Warhol. Many of his designs draw prominently from the styles of hard rock and the pop music industry.

== Personal life ==
In 1976, Hilfiger met Susan Cirona, an employee at the People's Place in Ithaca. They married in 1980 and divorced in 2000. Together they have four children: one son and three daughters. In 2003, Hilfiger's daughter Ally was part of the MTV reality series Rich Girls. His son, Richard ("Ricky Hil" or "Rich Hil"), is a rapper and musician.

On December 12, 2008, he married Dee Ocleppo; the couple welcomed a son in 2009.

== Publishing history ==
Largely complete list of works authored by Tommy Hilfiger
Yr	Book Title	Author(s)	Publisher	ISBN
1997	All-American	Hilfiger	Universe	ISBN 978-0789300508
2000	Rock Style: A Book of Rock, Hip-Hop, R&B, Punk, Funk and the Fashions That Give Looks to Those Sounds	Hilfiger, Anthony DeCurtis	Universe	ISBN 978-0789303837
2003	New England Style	Hilfiger, Anna Kasabian	Rizzoli	ISBN 978-0847825837
2004	New England: Icons, Influences and Inspirations from the American Northeast	Hilfiger	Rizzoli	ISBN 978-0847826612
2007	Grace Kelly: A Life in Pictures	Hilfiger (foreword), Pierre-Henri Verlhac	Pavilion	ISBN 978-1862057760
2009	Fashion Etcetera: Tommy Hilfiger Special Edition	Hilfiger (foreword), Sam Haskins	Private release	ISBN 9789111187121
2010	Tommy Hilfiger	Hilfiger, Assouline	Assouline	ISBN 978-2759403134
2011	Iconic America: A Roller Coaster Ride Through the Eye-Popping Panorama of American Pop Culture	Hilfiger, George Lois	Rizzoli	ISBN 978-0789324054
2016	American Dreamer: My Life in Fashion & Business	Hilfiger, Peter Knobler	Ballantine Books	ISBN 978-1101886212

== Filmography ==
Yr	Title	Format	Publisher	Role
1994	Frasier	Voice	NBC	As Robert
2001	Zoolander	Full-length film	VH1 Films	Cameo as himself
2005	The Cut	Reality TV series	CBS	Main judge as himself
2008	Tommy Hilfiger Presents Ironic Iconic America	Documentary film	Rizzoli	Co-host
2009	Project Runway	Reality TV series	Lifetime	Guest judge on episode 5
2012	Project Runway: All Stars	Reality TV series	Lifetime	Guest judge on episode 12
2012	American Idol	Reality TV series	Fox	Fashion consultant
2016	Zoolander 2	Full-length film	Red Hour Films	Cameo as himself
2020	Next in Fashion	Reality TV series	Netflix	Guest judge

== See also ==
- List of fashion designers
- List of footwear designers
