= J. Mack Slaughter Jr. =

American actor

- Born: December 28, 1983 (age 42); Fort Worth, Texas, U.S.
- Other names: J Mack Slaughter; Dr. J Mack
- Occupations: Emergency physician; philanthropist; actor; singer; youtuber; tiktoker
- Years active: 2002–2004 (acting); 2013–present (physician); 2020–present (youtuber); 2020–present (tiktoker)
- Spouse: Rebecca Shaw (m. 2013)
- Children: 3

YouTube information
- Channel: @Dr_JMack
- Genre: Medical
- Subscribers: 19.7 thousand
- Views: 300 million

J. Mack Slaughter Jr. (born December 28, 1983) is an American emergency physician, philanthropist, YouTuber, tiktoker and retired actor and singer.

== Early life ==
Slaughter was born on December 28, 1983, in Fort Worth, Texas to Martha "Marti" (née Card) and J. Mack Slaughter Sr. He has two older sisters.

== Career ==
=== Acting and musical career ===
Slaughter began acting in local theatre as a child. At the age of 15, he successfully auditioned for a boy band called Sons of Harmony started by a radio station in Dallas. They toured with Destiny's Child and opened for Bon Jovi and Jessica Simpson. Three years later, in 2001, the band broke up, after which Slaughter moved to Los Angeles to pursue a career in acting. In 2003, he won the role of Keith in the WB sitcom Like Family. The following year, Slaughter had a role in the comedy film, Fat Albert, starring Kenan Thompson and Kyla Pratt. In 2008, he founded the non-profit Music Meets Medicine, where musicians volunteer with children and youth at local hospitals, performing and teaching music. In 2018, Music Meets Medicine teamed up with non-profit, Kidd's Kids, to raise $150,000 to create a therapeutic arts space at Children's Medical Center.

=== Physician career ===
Slaughter eventually left acting to attend UT Southwestern Medical School, graduating in 2013 and is currently an emergency room physician, at several hospitals in the Fort Worth area.

=== Youtube and TikTok career ===
Slaughter began a YouTube channel entitled "Dr. J Mack" on March 20, 2020, in which he shares opinions and facts about his career as a physician. Slaughter began a TikTok page entitled "Dr.JMack | ER Doctor" on August 3, 2020.

== Personal life ==
Slaughter married his wife Rebecca Shaw on March 30, 2013. Together they have two sons and one daughter.

== Filmography ==
=== Film ===
Year	Title	Role	Notes
2004	Fat Albert	Arthur	

=== Television ===
Year	Title	Role	Notes
2002	What I Like About You	Kyle	1 episode
2003	Family Affair	Ethan Kane	1 episode
2003–2004	Like Family	Keith	23 episodes
