= Most Outrageous Moments =

- Narrated by: John Cramer
- Country of origin: United States
- No. of episodes: 21

Production
- Executive producer: Scott Satin
- Running time: 20 minutes

Original release
- Network: NBC
- Release: February 8, 2005 – August 28, 2009

Most Outrageous Moments (originally titled for the first season, Most Outrageous TV Moments) is an NBC clip show showcasing video bloopers and mishaps, and commonly used as a backup program by NBC to fill any timeslots where regular programming did not get any traction in the ratings, or to fill in timeslots between seasons of reality programming. In its first season, premiered on February 8, 2005, it aired a limited number of specials focusing on live television and game shows.

The series itself was a spin-off of Most Outrageous Game Show Moments, a series of specials airing in 2002 and 2003 showcasing outtakes and funny moments from television game shows, Hosted by Bob Eubanks, Jim Lange, Wink Martindale, Peter Marshall & Ben Stein and later Eubanks' co-host was Chuck Woolery. Since this particular series depended exclusively on stock footage, Outrageous Moments used laugh tracks and applause carts to provide audience responses, and, obviously, was not presented before a live studio audience.

It aired its second season on NBC as a regular series showing video footages of humorous events from various functions, but the show was not renewed after the 2005–2006 season. However, it continued to air in repeats and returned with all new episodes on April 22, 2008. Scott Satin was the executive producer. John Cramer was the narrator. Bob Eubanks hosted the Most Outrageous Game Show Moments series, but the regular Most Outrageous Moments series had no regular host.

On March 13, 2009, it was confirmed that NBC planned to air five additional episodes during the upcoming summer season, but no further episodes would be produced, thus canceling the series.
