= The Cut (2005 TV series) =

CBS reality television program

- Genre: Reality competition
- Created by: Darren Maddern; Craig Piligian
- Directed by: Sam Dock
- Judges: Naomi Campbell; Fabolous; Funkmaster Flex; Jennifer Lopez
- Country of origin: United States
- Original language: English
- No. of seasons: 1
- No. of episodes: 13

Production
- Production locations: New York City, New York, United States
- Running time: 60 minutes
- Production companies: Cut Productions; Lionsgate Television; Pilgrim Studios

Original release
- Network: CBS
- Release: June 9 – September 7, 2005

The Cut is an American reality television series for world class fashion designers hosted and sponsored by fashion designer and billionaire Tommy Hilfiger. Sixteen designers split into new teams each week to complete tasks, with a player eliminated each round. The show aired on CBS from June 9 to September 7, 2005, and shifted timeslots through the summer. Of note was the catch phrase Hilfiger used for each elimination ("you're out of style"), celebrity appearances, and the New York City setting. The winner had the opportunity to design a clothing line for HIllfiger.

In the final, three contestants, Shante "Princess" Warren, Elizabeth Saab, and Chris Cortez, were allowed to bring back former teammates to help design a window display. Hilfiger chose Cortez as the winner.
