= The Benefactor (TV series) =

American 2004 television series

- Genre: Reality competition
- Starring: Mark Cuban
- Country of origin: United States
- Original language: English
- No. of seasons: 1
- No. of episodes: 6

Production
- Running time: 60 minutes
- Production company: 12 Yard

Original release
- Network: ABC
- Release: September 13 – October 25, 2004

The Benefactor is an American reality television show broadcast for one season on ABC in 2004. The premise involved 16 contestants trying to win US$1 million from billionaire entrepreneur and Dallas Mavericks owner Mark Cuban.

== Contestants ==
Name	Age	Hometown	Eliminated
Femia Durosinmi	22	Henderson, Nevada	Winner
Dominic Scali - "The Rock Star"	22	Las Vegas, Nevada	Runner-up
Linda Caruso	30	North Hampton, New Hampshire	Week 6
Tiffaney Weisser	23	Dallas, Texas	Week 5
Spencer Brown	31	Atlanta, Georgia	Week 5
Kevin Hall	33	Dallas, Texas	Week 4
Chris Harris	26	Duluth, Georgia	Week 3
Shawn Wallace-Baiza	29	Hemet, California	Week 3
Latane Meade	25	San Diego, California	Week 3
Christine Agosta	25	Boise, Idaho	Week 3
William Chappell	28	Gresham, Oregon	Week 2
Mario Mendez	39	Glendale, California	Week 2
Katherine "Kathy" Whipple	23	Webster, New York	Week 2
Grayson O'Connor	26	Portland, Oregon	Week 1
Laurel	34	Santa Monica, California	Week 1
Richard Larsen	42	Alpharetta, Georgia	Week 1
