= $25 Million Dollar Hoax =

- Starring: Chrissy Sanford
- Country of origin: United States
- No. of episodes: 3

Production
- Executive producers: Ben Silverman; Scott Hallock; Kevin Healey; Stuart Krasnow
- Running time: 60 minutes
- Production companies: Hallock-Healey Entertainment; Krasnow Productions; Reveille Productions

Original release
- Network: NBC
- Release: November 8 – November 22, 2004

$25 Million Dollar Hoax is an unscripted television series that was originally shown on NBC from November 8 to November 22, 2004.

The series is noted to be similar in style to FOX's My Big Fat Obnoxious Fiance, which aired in 2004. It is based on a United Kingdom show titled The Million Pound Hoax, broadcast on Sky One earlier that year.

== Synopsis ==
In the series, daughter Chrissy Sanford plays a hoax on her family by convincing them she had won a $25,000,000 lottery prize through the internet, and that it had changed her from a sweet girl into a spend-a-holic.

$25 Million Dollar Hoax contained guest appearances by Ed McMahon, George Gray, and N*SYNC's Lance Bass.

Chrissy successfully pulled off the hoax, which won her and her family over $400,000 in cash and prizes.

== Cast ==
- Chrissy Sanford – As herself
- Guy Sanford (father) – As himself
- Lois Sanford (mother) – As herself
- Paul Sanford (brother) – As himself
- Eric Sanford (brother) – As himself
- Andrew Sanford (brother) – As himself
- David Sanford (brother) – As himself
- Phillip Sanford (brother) – As himself
- Matthew Sanford (brother) – As himself
- Jameson Karns (friend) – As himself
- Ed McMahon – As himself
- George Gray – As himself
- Lance Bass – As himself

== Overseas broadcasts ==
- Canada: Global
- United Kingdom: Challenge
