= The Player (2004 TV series) =

- Created by: Don Weiner; Happy Walters; Cary Woods
- Country of origin: United States
- Original language: English
- No. of seasons: 1
- No. of episodes: 8

Production
- Running time: 60 minutes
- Production companies: Don Weiner Productions; Immortal Entertainment

Original release
- Network: UPN
- Release: August 4 – September 15, 2004

The Player is an American reality television program broadcast on UPN from August 4 to September 15, 2004 in which several men compete with each other using their "player skills" to seduce an attractive woman. The woman for the show's only season was Dawn Olivieri.

The program is hosted by phone by the "Ultimate Player" until the end of the series, when his identity is revealed to be Rob Mariano from Survivor.
