= Steve Harvey's Big Time Challenge =

American television variety show

- Genre: Variety show Comedy
- Directed by: Morris Abraham
- Starring: Steve Harvey
- Country of origin: United States
- Original language: English
- No. of seasons: 2

Production
- Executive producers: Steve Harvey; Rushion McDonald; Madeleine Smithberg
- Production companies: Nu-Opp Inc. Telepictures Productions

Original release
- Network: The WB
- Release: September 11, 2003 – May 15, 2005

Steve Harvey's Big Time Challenge, also known as Steve Harvey's Big Time and Big Time, is a television variety show that aired on The WB from September 11, 2003 to May 15, 2005, hosted by Steve Harvey. In each episode, performers compete for a $10,000 prize.
