= Amish in the City =

- Genre: Reality
- Created by: Jon Kroll
- Country of origin: United States
- Original language: English
- No. of seasons: 1
- No. of episodes: 9

Production
- Production location: New York City
- Running time: 52 minutes
- Production companies: New Line Television; Stick Figure Productions

Original release
- Network: UPN
- Release: July 28 – September 21, 2004

Amish in the City is an American reality television series which aired on UPN from July 28 to September 21, 2004. The plot revolved around five Amish teenagers experiencing "modern" (non-Amish) culture by living in a house with six mainstream American teenagers.

The show follows the Amish teenagers as they explore their freedom from the Amish religious code, which is a common element of the Rumspringa ("running around") period before they decide whether to join the Amish church. Typically, nearly 90% of teenagers end their Rumspringa with the choice to be baptized as Amish; however, at the conclusion of the show, it was unclear which of the show's participants chose not to return to the Amish church and which went back to the Amish way of life. Many accused the show of giving the participants an unrealistic view of "modern" culture and of showing the behavior of the unadjusted Amish like a "spectator sport" for mainstream American viewers. The producers stated that they plan to follow the original series with updates on the current status of the cast, especially since their decisions at the end of the series may change.

The concept was initially denounced by some for appearing to capitalize upon popular stereotypes about the Amish; later critical reviews were more positive.

The series was later aired in the United Kingdom on LIVINGtv2 and Trouble, in New Zealand on TV2, in Denmark on Kanal 5 and in Sweden on Kanal 5.

== Cast ==
Cast	Status	Other
Ariel	Not Amish	From Los Angeles and a vegan at the time of the series.
Jonas P. Kurtz	Did not return to the Amish	A construction worker from Jamesport, Missouri, Jonas was 18 years old at the time of the series. His family had moved to Bloomfield, Iowa, but Jonas and an older brother returned to Missouri to work in construction. The brother reportedly drowned in a pond in 2001. Jonas studied for and received his GED on the show and enrolled in college. He later appeared on MTV's True Life in an episode titled "I'm Ex-Amish".
Kevan Moezzi	Not Amish	Born August 1, 1981 in Reno, Nevada to an Iranian Muslim father and an American Presbyterian mother, Kevan was a salesman and swim instructor from Las Vegas at the time of the series. He started swimming competitively at the age of 5, becoming among the quickest in the West Coast. He has also worked as a lifeguard and as a fitness trainer. After the series aired, he began working as a Los Angeles-based comedian and actor, using the stage name "K-von". His most notable television appearances were on TV One's Bill Bellamy's Who's Got Jokes? in 2007, Showtime's Comics Without Borders in 2008 and as a featured cast member on two seasons of MTV's Disaster Date in 2010. In 2009, he toured with fellow Iranian American comedian Maz Jobrani as Jobrani's warm-up act. Kevan has also opened for Jamie Kennedy. He continues to tour the country, performing live stand-up comedy.
Meagan	Not Amish	From Chicago, a freelance fashion stylist at the time of the series.
Miriam Troyer	Did not return to the Amish	Daughter of Amish Bishop John D. Troyer of Fredericksburg, Ohio. Reportedly lived in Berlin, Ohio, at the time of the series, working as a waitress and hotel maid. During the series, Miriam mentioned that fellow cast member Randy was a former boyfriend. She later became an Emergency Room technician.
Mose J Gingerich	Did not return to the Amish	Born July 27, 1979, into an Old Order Amish community in Greenwood, Wisconsin, Mose was 24 years old at the time of the series. The only cast member baptized in the Amish faith at the time, he was formerly an Amish schoolteacher. After the series aired, he owned a construction company which went out of business due to health issues. Using the name "Moses" professionally, he currently sells vehicles at an automobile dealership. Now married to a non-Amish woman, with two children and a stepson, he has become a paternal leader in the ex-Amish community near Columbia, Missouri, and counsels them. Mose co-produced and appeared in Amish at the Altar, which aired on November 10, 2010, and Amish: Out of the Order, which aired on December 8, 2010, both on the National Geographic Channel. He currently co-produces and stars in the 2012 National Geographic Channel series Amish: Out of Order. Mose maintains a photo gallery on his personal website.
Nick	Not Amish	From Boston, a busboy and musician at the time of the series.
Randy D. Stoll	Did not return to the Amish	A construction worker from Montgomery, Indiana, Randy was 24 years old at the time of the series. During the series, fellow cast member Miriam mentioned that Randy was a former boyfriend.
Reese Allbritton	Not Amish	Originally from Hattiesburg, Mississippi, a Los Angeles club promoter at the time of the series. Openly gay. Reese Allbritton has been credited with other TV and film appearances,
Ruth Yoder	Returned to the Amish	A factory worker from Ashland, Ohio, Ruth was 20 years old at the time of the series.
Whitney	Not Amish	From Los Angeles, a college student at the time of the series. African American. Whitney's boyfriend had been killed in an unsolved drive-by shooting.

== Episodes ==
No.	Title	Original release date
1	"This is My Very First Time on an Escalator"	July 28, 2004
2	"This is My Very First Time on an Escalator"	July 28, 2004
3	"Reggae? Never Heard of the Dude"	August 4, 2004
4	"What's White Chocolate?"	August 11, 2004
5	"I Would Like You To Kiss Ariel"	August 18, 2004
6	"You Like It, You Love It, You Want Some More of It"	August 25, 2004
7	"Drama In The House"	September 1, 2004
8	"We're Going to Walk Down the Red Carpet"	September 8, 2004
9	"We're Going to Amish Country"	September 15, 2004
10	"I Am Torn"	September 21, 2004
