= Like Family =

- Genre: Sitcom
- Created by: Dan Fogelman
- Written by: Alex Barnow; Kenya Barris; Gerry Cohen; Marc Firek; Dan Fogelman; Casey Johnson; Jay Kogen; Al Sonja L. Rice; Steve Ross; Kenny Schwartz; Scott Weinger; Rick Wiener; David Windsor
- Directed by: John Fortenberry; Shelley Jensen; Barnet Kellman; Joe Regalbuto; Keith Samples
- Starring: Holly Robinson Peete; Diane Farr; J. Mack Slaughter Jr. Megalyn Echikunwoke; B.J. Mitchell; J. Anthony Brown; Kevin Michael Richardson
- Composer: Marc Bonilla
- Country of origin: United States
- Original language: English
- No. of seasons: 1
- No. of episodes: 22 (1 unaired)

Production
- Executive producers: Warren Littlefield; Kenny Schwartz; Rick Weiner
- Producers: Ernest Johnson; Al Sonja L. Rice; Holly Robinson Peete
- Running time: 30 minutes
- Production companies: The Littlefield Company; 3 Hounds Productions; MHS Productions; Warner Bros. Television

Original release
- Network: The WB
- Release: September 19, 2003 – April 22, 2004

Like Family is an American sitcom television series that aired on The WB from September 19, 2003 to April 22, 2004. The series stars Holly Robinson Peete and Kevin Michael Richardson and lasted one season. Like Family was created and produced by Dan Fogelman, and executive produced by Warren Littlefield, Kenny Schwartz, and Rick Weiner.

== Synopsis ==
Holly Robinson Peete stars as Tanya Ward, the matriarch of a middle-class African American family that live in suburban New Jersey. Tanya's family includes husband Ed (Kevin Michael Richardson), their 12-year-old son Bobby (B.J. Mitchell) and 16-year-old daughter Danika (Megalyn Echikunwoke). Rounding out the family is Ed's father, Ed "Pop" Ward Sr. (J. Anthony Brown), an opinionated and feisty senior citizen.

When Tanya's closest friend Maddie Hudson (Diane Farr), a Caucasian single mom, hits a rough patch, Tanya and her family invite Maddie and her 16-year-old son Keith (J. Mack Slaughter Jr.) to live with them. Episodes focus on the problems and comical situations arising from both families living and working together.

The series was cancelled after all but one of the 22 episodes produced were aired. Though the unaired series finale was later shown when TVOne picked up the show for reruns.

== Cast ==
- Holly Robinson Peete as Tanya Ward
- Diane Farr as Maddie Hudson, Tanya's best friend
- J. Mack Slaughter Jr. as Keith Hudson, Maddie's son
- Megalyn Echikunwoke as Danika Ward, Tanya & Ed's daughter
- B.J. Mitchell as Bobby Ward, Tanya & Ed's son
- J. Anthony Brown as Ed "Pop" Ward Sr., Ed's father and Tanya's father-in-law
- Kevin Michael Richardson as Ed Ward Jr., Tanya's husband

== Nielsen ratings ==
Season		Episodes	Premiere	Season finale	Viewers (in millions)	Rank
1	2003–2004	22	September 19, 2003	April 22, 2004	2.61	#191

== Episodes ==
No.	Title	Directed by	Written by	Original release date	Prod. code	Viewers (millions)
1	"Pilot"	Barnet Kellman	Dan Fogelman	September 19, 2003	475228	3.81
When two families - one black, one white - share the same house, they discover that their differences are definitely more than skin deep. Tanya (Peete), Ed and their teen kids are a middle-class African-American family who open their doors for an old friend who is down on her luck. Newly single Maddie (Farr) and her 16-year-old son Keith just need a place to stay until they can get back on their feet. What sounds like a perfect arrangement soon becomes non-stop tension (and laughs) as the two families argue about everything but skin color.
2	"Under One Roof"	Barnet Kellman	Dan Fogelman	September 26, 2003	177051	3.16
Tanya lectures Ed about getting along with Keith, but she fails to heed her own advice when she butts heads with Maddie over the single mom's sisterly relationship with Danika. Meanwhile, Pop offers Bobby tips on dealing with women.
3	"The Curfew"	Barnet Kellman	Rick Weiner	October 3, 2003	177052	3.33
When Danika learns that Keith doesn't have a curfew, she takes the rules into her own hands—and both teenagers end up grounded as a result. The adults try to find a happy medium between Maddie's loose hold on Keith and Tanya's strict rules for Danika. Meanwhile, Keith learns the importance of rules while babysitting Bobby when getting a taste of his own medicine.
4	"The Date"	Barnet Kellman	Casey Johnson & David Windsor	October 10, 2003	177053	2.73
Feeling jealous of the friendship between Tanya and Maddie and fed up with the lack of privacy in his own home, Ed takes Pop's advice and plans a romantic evening for Tanya, but getting everyone out of the house proves much easier said than done. Meanwhile, when Keith's friends leave on a trip without him, Ed helps him see the importance of his new family.
5	"College Debate"	Barnet Kellman	Al Sonja L. Rice	October 17, 2003	177054	2.95
Maddie clashes with Keith over his decision to join a band when his schedule conflicts with his college-prep class. Keith then announces he is skipping college to pursue his musical dream. With that he goes to Ed for guidance. Lastly, Pop trains Bobby to be a pro golfer when he grows up.
6	"Black Like Keith"	Gerry Cohen	Jay Kogen	October 31, 2003	177055	2.7
After a girl rejects Keith because he is white, he gets Pop to coach him on "being black." Also, Danika gets up the courage to bring her new white boyfriend home.
7	"The Dance"	Barnet Kellman	Alex Barnow & Marc Firek	November 7, 2003	177056	3.50
Concerned that Keith isn't adjusting to his new school, Maddie and Tanya convince Keith to take heartbroken Danika to the homecoming dance after her date cancels and leaves her devastated. Meanwhile, Ed reveals the truth to Tanya about why he stood her up at their own school dance years ago.
8	"Parental Authority"	Unknown	Unknown	November 14, 2003	177057	2.98
Keith makes Ed realize that he and Tanya have unequal parental authority in their home. Meanwhile, when Danika and Bobby discover their parent's decision-making dispute, they manipulate the situation to get their own way with a nose piercing and a new dog in the house causing the family to go into chaos.
9	"Value of a Dollar"	Joe Regalbuto	Story by : Dan Fogelman; Teleplay by : Rick Weiner & Kenny Schwartz	November 21, 2003	177058	2.76
After using the emergency credit card Maddie gave him to pay for dinner, Keith goes to work for Ed at the car wash to learn the value of a dollar. Although, things turn rocky after Keith sees a working man don't make that much and wants a raise. Keith therefore tries to create his own business to see if he can make more money faster.
10	"Who's Your Daddy?"	John Fortenberry	Dan Fogelman	January 9, 2004	177059	2.16
Maddie and Tanya run into Keith's father Roger (guest star David Lee Smith). Roger says he wants to see Keith sometime and Maddie decides to allow him to after telling Keith. Keith really likes Roger and he then goes to a rock concert with him. Meanwhile, Ed and Keith were supposed to bowl in a tournament the night of the concert. Keith goes to the concert and Bobby fills in at the tournament. Keith realizes that his real family is at the bowling alley and shows up to compete with Ed.
11	"Bobby's Bully"	Shelley Jensen	Casey Johnson & David Windsor	January 16, 2004	177060	2.38
When Bobby suddenly stops turning in school assignments, Tanya and Ed are quick to blame Maddie for raising Keith to be a bad influence. Bobby confides in Keith that his irresponsible behavior is actually being caused by a bully at school, but feels betrayed when Keith reveals Bobby's secret under pressure.
12	"My Two Moms"	Unknown	Unknown	January 23, 2004	177061	2.59
When Keith can't decide between two girls (Tammy and Mary), Tanya and Maddie compete over which one he should choose and to take to a school 1970s party. Each mom tries to convince Keith to choose the girl most like herself. Meanwhile, Ed helps Danika smooth things over with her boyfriend after they get in a fight.
13	"Ladies' Night"	Shelley Jensen	Kenny Schwartz	January 30, 2004	177062	2.65
Tanya and Keith encourage Maddie to start dating as they feel she is lonely---and Tanya takes Maddie to a singles gathering one night. Although Keith realizes that he has a bigger problem over this than expected when Maddie brings home a man that he doesn't approve of. Lastly, Ed makes it hard for Danica to date as she wants to go out with a guy.
14	"Daddy Knows Best"	Unknown	Unknown	February 6, 2004	177065	2.28
When Tanya's dad Bill (guest-star George Wallace) visits the family without his wife, Tanya jumps to the conclusion her parents are having marital problems. Ed discovers that Bill is having medical problems and convinces him to be honest with Tanya. Meanwhile, Pop brings home his new girlfriend Ethel (guest-star Tembi Locke).
15	"The Permit"	Unknown	Unknown	February 13, 2004	177064	2.34
After failing his driver's test, Keith takes the blame for crashing Tanya and Maddie's new convertible, even though Danika was the driver. When Danika comes clean, Ed realizes his expectations may have been too high for her and too low for Keith.
16	"Women at Work"	Unknown	Unknown	March 18, 2004	177063	2.57
Maddie gets a prized promotion at work, but her new responsibilities give her less time to spend at home with Keith, who then turns to Tanya for help with a school problem. Meanwhile, Bobby frets over a project that he and his mother are working on together. Lastly, Tanya considers of returning to being an attorney.
17	"Dating the Enemy"	Unknown	Unknown	March 25, 2004	177067	2.65
Danika competes with her nemesis Lauren (guest star Ashleigh Ann Wood) for a spot on the debate team. When Keith starts to date Lauren, Danika is convinced that Lauren is only seeing him to upset Danika. Meanwhile, Bobby takes his new girlfriend (guest star Camille Lache Smith) on a double date with Pop and Ethel (guest star Tembi Locke).
18	"Romancing the Home"	Unknown	Unknown	April 1, 2004	177068	2.50
Keith's loyalty to his girlfriend (guest star Ashleigh Ann Wood) is tested when the "ultimate" girl, Anna (guest star Tamara Feldman), propositions him at Danika's slumber party. Meanwhile, Danika is embarrassed by Tanya and Maddie's behavior at her party.
19	"Sex Ed"	Unknown	Unknown	April 8, 2004	177069	2.46
Keith and Lauren (guest-star Ashleigh Ann Wood) decide to take their relationship to the next level, but Keith is uncomfortable talking to Maddie about sex, so Ed tries to give Keith advice. Tanya decides it's also time to have a serious talk with Danika about sex. Meanwhile, Bobby thinks the family is throwing him a surprise "eleven and a quarter" birthday party because the adults immediately stop talking whenever he enters a room.
20	"Brother's Keeper"	Unknown	Unknown	April 15, 2004	177066	2.11
Tanya tries to force her brother Dave (guest-star Kent Faulcon) to get along with Maddie. Sparks finally fly between Maddie and Tanya's brother Dave when the serviceman visits the Ward home during a furlough. Although, Tanya has trouble staying out of their business. Meanwhile, Keith and Danika get "married" for a school project, but Keith doesn't take the assignment as seriously as his faux bride does and Danika wants a divorce to salvage her grades.
21	"Roger Returns"	Barnet Kellman	Al Sonja L. Rice & Kenya Barris	April 22, 2004	177070	1.78
Keith's 17th birthday, are disrupted when Keith's estranged father, Roger (guest-star David Lee Smith) suddenly arrives in town. Maddie worries that Roger will disappoint Keith again and Tanya is upset when she finds out that Ed has been helping Roger get back on his feet. Meanwhile, Bobby tries to get Danika and Lauren (guest-star Ashleigh Ann Wood) to settle their differences. Lil Jon performs at Keith's birthday party.
22	"We're Gonna Need More Peanut M&M's"	N/A	N/A	Unaired	177071	N/A
Tanya and Maddie have a huge blowout after Tanya catches Maddie and her ex-husband Roger (David Lee Smith) in bed together. The two women soon reconcile, however, and Maddie confesses an unsettling secret to Tanya. Meanwhile, Keith breaks up with Lauren (Ashleigh Ann Wood) when he realizes that she and Danika will never get along.

== Syndication ==
On June 8, 2009, reruns of the series began airing on TV One in the United States. The show was also shown on Disney Channel in the United Kingdom, although the episodes were edited for a children's audience.

== Awards and nominations ==
Year	Award	Result	Category	Recipient
2004	BET Comedy Awards	Nominated	Outstanding Supporting Actor in a Comedy Series	J. Anthony Brown
