= A. Smith & Co. =

American entertainment TV production company

A. Smith & Co. Productions
- Type: Private
- Industry: Television production
- Founded: 2000; 26 years ago
- Founders: Arthur Smith; Kent Weed
- Headquarters: Toluca Lake, Los Angeles, United States
- Key people: Arthur Smith (chairman and CEO)
- Number of employees: 51-200 (2025)
- Parent: Tinopolis (2011–)
- Website: asmithco.com

A. Smith & Co. Productions is an American entertainment television production company that specializes in creating unscripted reality, documentary and non-fiction programming for a wide range of networks. It was co-founded in 2000 by Arthur Smith and Kent Weed. Since 2011, it has been owned by Welsh international TV group Tinopolis. The company is known for producing adaptations of international formats such as Hell's Kitchen and American Ninja Warrior.

== History ==
In November 2000, when Canadian producer and former CBC Sports executive Arthur Smith left his role as executive vice president of programming, production and news at American sports channel group Fox Sports Net following his successful run, he partnered with former W.A.V.E Productions founder Kent Weed, establishing their own American unscripted reality production company based in Los Angeles, California, entitled A. Smith & Co. Productions. Arthur Smith became chairman and CEO of the new unscripted studio, whilst Kent Weed became the new company's president.

In October 2010, A. Smith & Co. Productions had entered the management field with the acquisition of management and production firm Braverman/Bloom, which gained A.Smith & Co. Productions its own management division with Braverman/Bloom becoming a subsidiary of the while retaining the Braverman/Bloom name. Michael Braverman and Barry Bloom, founders of Braverman/Bloom continued to manage the management firm under its new parent company.

In June 2011, it was announced that Welsh international TV production group Tinopolis had acquired the company.

In November 2016, The company expanded its production operations into the factual and documentary programming and entertainment production genres with the establishment of its two new production divisions as had merged with Tinopolis' production subsidiary BASE Productions into forming a new factual production division within A. Smith & Co. Productions, which was named A. Smith & Co. Dox, that would produce documentary & factual programming.

In November 2025, it was announced that Jenny Daly had left the company as president after only six months, with Daly said to return to her "independent and entrepreneurial roots".

== Filmography ==
=== 2000s ===
Title	Years	Network	Notes
Paradise Hotel	2003–2019	FOX; MyNetworkTV; Fox Reality Channel	First ever production by the company.
The Swan	2004	FOX	
Hell's Kitchen	2005–present	FOX	
Skating with Celebrities	2006	FOX	
Pros vs. Joes	2006–2010	Spike	
American Gangster	2006–2009	BET	Took over production for seasons 2-3.
Kitchen Nightmares	2007–2014	FOX	
I Survived a Japanese Game Show	2008–2009	ABC	
Unsung	2008–2024	TV One	
Full Throttle Saloon	2009–2015	Destination America	
Conspiracy Theory with Jesse Ventura	2009–2012	TruTV	
American Ninja Warrior	2009–present	G4/NBC	Took over production since season 2. Co-production with Tokyo Broadcasting System and Lake Paradise Entertainment (seasons 2-5).

=== 2010s ===
Title	Years	Network	Notes
The World According to Paris	2011	Oxygen	
Ellen's Design Challenge	2015–2016	HGTV	co-production with Telepictures and A Very Good Production
American Ninja Warrior: Ninja vs. Ninja	2016–2018	Esquire Network (2016); USA Network (2017–2018)	
American Ninja Warrior Junior	2018–2021	Universal Kids/Peacock	A children's edition of American Ninja Warrior. Co-production with Tokyo Broadcasting System.
The Titan Games	2019–2020	NBC	co-production with Universal Television Alternative Studio and Seven Bucks Productions
Welcome to Plathville	2019–present	TLC	

=== 2020s ===
Title	Years	Network	Notes
Ellen's Next Great Designer	2021	HBO Max	co-production with Telepictures and A Very Good Production
Floor is Lava	2022	Netflix	Co-production with Haymaker Media and Gang of Wolves (season 3)
Human vs Hamster	2024	Max	
