= Arthur Smith (producer) =

Canadian-born American television producer (born 1960)

- Born: November 25, 1960 (age 65); Montreal, Quebec, Canada
- Education: Ryerson University (now Toronto Metropolitan University)
- Occupation: TV producer

Arthur Smith (born November 25, 1960) is a Canadian-born American television producer who is the chairman of A. Smith & Co. and of Tinopolis America. Best known for the reality competition shows American Ninja Warrior and Hell's Kitchen, he was inducted into the Realscreen Hall of Fame in 2021, and was named Producer of the Year 2020 by Broadcasting & Cable. He previously worked for CBC Sports, Dick Clark Productions, MCA Television Group, and Fox Sports Net. He has won multiple NAACP awards for his series Unsung, Rose D'Or Awards for I Survived A Japanese Game Show, a Critics' Choice Real TV Award, a Realscreen Award and multiple Reality Television Awards. In addition, his shows have been nominated for Daytime Emmys, Nickelodeon Kid's Choice Awards, Producers' Guild Awards and People's Choice Awards. Smith is also the author of REACH: Hard Lessons and Learned Truths from a Lifetime in Television, his memoir that was released in 2023, which Forbes called an “immediate must-read.”

== Early life ==
Smith was born Montreal in 1960 and grew up in Hampstead, Quebec. He became interested in television during his youth, making predictions of television ratings and reading Variety and The Hollywood Reporter. At the age of sixteen he became a disc jockey in Montreal. He also acted in television commercials and two films; Pinball Summer and Hog Wild. Smith attended Ryerson Polytechnical Institute in Toronto. He chose communications over theatre as his major. While at Ryerson, Smith continued to act. He appeared in episodes of Hangin' In and Flappers. He also recorded voice-overs for commercials and produced segments for the CBC Radio's Variety Tonight. He graduated in 1982 and was class valedictorian. One of the first alumni to be inducted into Ryerson's Wall of Fame, he is also the founding sponsor of the Ryerson in LA program, which grants scholarships to numerous students from Ryerson to come to Los Angeles to learn about the entertainment business. In 2024, Toronto Metropolitan University (formerly Ryerson University), unveiled the newly renovated and renamed Arthur Smith Virtual Production Studio.

== Career ==
Smith also serves as the U.S. chairman of Tinopolis.

=== CBC Sports ===
During his final year at Ryerson, the CBC hired Smith as a junior producer. His first assignment was a profile of Canadian high-jumper Milt Ottey. He went on to work as a camera director for Hockey Night in Canada and a producer for the 1986 Commonwealth Games, World Junior Hockey Championships, and horse races from Woodbine Racetrack.

Smith was the lead producer for CBC's coverage of the 1984 Summer Olympics, 1988 Winter Olympics, and 1988 Summer Olympics. For his work on the 1988 games, Smith and his colleagues won Gemini Awards for excellence in sports and spot news coverage (of the Ben Johnson doping scandal). In 1987 he became the lead producer for the CFL on CBC, where he introduced new graphics, theme song and animation and a halftime magazine show. On October 10, 1988, at 28years old, Smith succeeded Don MacPherson to become the youngest person to ever head of CBC Sports. In his role, he acquired a number of broadcasting rights for the network, including the 1992 Winter Olympics, CART racing, and the World Figure Skating Championships.

=== Dick Clark Productions ===
In 1990, Smith left CBC to become vice-president of entertainment programming at Dick Clark Productions. In May 1993 he was promoted to senior vice president. During his tenure at Dick Clark Productions, Smith produced a number of television programs and specials, including the CableACE Awards and American Music Award.

=== MCA Television Group ===
In 1995, Smith joined MCA Television Group as senior vice president. His responsibilities included producing television specials, reality programming, and pay-per-view events. During his short time with MCA, Smith was able to get commitments from all of the Big Four networks.

=== Fox Sports Net ===
In 1996, Smith joined the fledgling Fox Sports Net as executive vice-president of programming, production and news. Smith helped propel the network into the world of cable sports, launching 22 sports networks. He also served as executive producer on all network events including major league baseball, college football and all original programming including Fox Sports News, Hardcore Football, NFL Total Access, The Last Word with Jim Rome, and Goin' Deep, hosted by Joe Buck and Chris Meyers.

=== A. Smith & Co. ===
In 2000, Smith founded his own production company, A. Smith & Co. Since then, A. Smith & Co. has produced more than 200 television shows for 50 networks. In 2011, A. Smith & Co. merged with the Tinopolis Group.

A. Smith & Co. has created series in the reality, documentary, and non-fiction spaces for over two decades, including: Hell's Kitchen (FOX); American Ninja Warrior (NBC); Mental Samurai (FOX); The Titan Games (NBC); Voices of Fire (Netflix); Death by Magic (Netflix); Welcome to Plathville (TLC); Trading Spaces (TLC); Pros vs. Joes (Spike); Kitchen Nightmares (FOX); American Gangster (BET); American Gangster: Trap Queens (BET+); Unsung (TV One); Paradise Hotel (FOX); The Swan (FOX); Skating with Celebrities (FOX); I Survived a Japanese Game Show (ABC); Conspiracy Theory with Jesse Ventura (truTV); Full Throttle Saloon (truTV), The World According to Paris (Oxygen), Human vs Hamster (Max), American Ninja Warrior Junior (Universal Kids), Floor Is Lava (Netflix) and the NFL’s Pro Bowl Games (ABC/ESPN).

=== REACH: Hard Lessons and Learned Truths from a Lifetime in Television ===
In 2023, Smith’s memoir, REACH: Hard Lessons and Learned Truths from a Lifetime in Television, was published by Blackstone Publishing. In the book, called an “immediate must-read” by Forbes, Smith writes about significant moments in his career in sports and television. All of Smith’s proceeds from the book went to his REACH Foundation,which is a 501.c.3 nonprofit organization dedicated to help children in need through scholarships and other endeavors.
