= Voices of Fire =

Voices of Fire may refer to:

- Voices of Fire (album), a 2016 album by Van Canto
- Voices of Fire (TV series), a 2020 TV series

== See also ==
- Voice of Fire, a 1967 abstract painting
- Voice of the Fire, a 1996 novel by Alan Moore
