= Don MacPherson (broadcast executive) =

Canadian broadcast executive

Donald MacPherson was a Canadian broadcast executive who served as head of First Choice from 1981 to 1984 and CBC Sports from 1984 to 1988.

== Early career ==
MacPherson joined CBC Television in 1952. He was the producer of Mr. Fixit from 1955 to 1962, In View from 1962 to 1963, and The Observer from 1964 to 1966. He left the CBC to become an executive producer at the CTV Television Network and in 1969 he was promoted to Director of News, Features and Information Programming. In 1974 he became the head of the CBC's English-language television and radio networks. In 1979, MacPherson left the CBC to become president of Barber Greene Productions and vice-president of the Global Television Network.

== First Choice ==
In July 1981, MacPherson became the first president of First Choice, a proposed pay-tv service. In March of 1982, the Canadian Radio-television and Telecommunications Commission granted Canada's first pay-television licence to First Choice. Prior to launch, First Choice entered into a controversial agreement with Playboy Enterprises that would see the network air movies that mirrored Playboy content. MacPherson defended the decision, stating that "It's been a long time since anyone branded Playboy magazine pornographic, or claimed that it goes beyond accepted community standards" and that the network would determine whether to renew its contract with Playboy "largely through asking our subscribers." First Choice launched on February 1, 1983. During its first year, First Choice suffered from higher than expected losses. The network was forced to lay off staff and sold 58% of its stock at below market value in order to bring in more money. MacPherson blamed the losses on the CRTC's decision to grant a second pay-tv licence, which resulted in a competitor, SuperChannel, offering much of the same programming as First Choice.

== CBC Sports ==
On January 17, 1984, MacPherson was named head of television sports for CBC Television.

In 1986, CBC outbid CTV for the rights to the World Figure Skating Championships, ending that network's 25-year run as the broadcaster of the world championship. CBC also secured the rights to Rendez-vous '87, which was watched by 48% to 50% of the English television audience.

Budget cuts led to the network cutting back on lower-rated sporting events, including the Grand Slam of Tennis and Montreal Expos games. For the 1987 World Women's Curling Championship, budget cuts limited the network's coverage to edited reports after each end of play. The network was unable to broadcast Canadian’s final two games of 1988 World Junior Ice Hockey Championships due to budgetary issues.

On March 14, 1987, the network chose to switch from a Hockey Night in Canada game that was about to go into overtime to a scheduled news broadcast. HNIC host Dave Hodge was visibly disgusted, questioned the decision, and informed viewers “that's the way things go today in sports and this network” and flipped his pen in the air. Hodge was suspended, with MacPherson stating that "It's not a commentator's job to decide what we should do and what we shouldn't do. It's as simple as that, really." Hodge did not return to the network, with Hodge stating he was fired and MacPherson insisting that Hodge had not been dismissed. Hodge joined Global's NHL coverage and was replaced by Ron MacLean on Hockey Night in Canada.

After the 1987–88 NHL season, CBC's rights to air Hockey Night in Canada expired and Molson Brewery, which owned HNIC's rights, allowed CTV to bid for the package. It was the first time in the history of the program, which began on CBC Radio in 1933, that a network other than CBC was allowed to bid for the package. Molson allowed CBC to match CTV's offer and after CBC agreed to allow promotional tie-ins such as permitting Molson signs on arena boards, using a Molson logo as part of the televised scoreboard, and providing the brewery with free promotional spots, the two sides signed a six-year contract to keep the program on the CBC.

After the 1988 Summer Olympics, MacPherson stepped down as head of CBC sports. On October 10, 1988, he was succeeded by 28-year old producer Arthur Smith.

== Death ==
MacPherson died on March 5, 1998, at his home in Orono, Ontario. He was survived by two children and his longtime partner Bev Oda.
