= In View =

In View may refer to:

- In View: The Best of R.E.M. 1988–2003, a DVD featuring videos by R.E.M.
- In View (TV series), a Canadian cultural current affairs television series
- "In View" (song), a 2006 song by The Tragically Hip
- In View (film), a 2017 Irish drama film
