= The World According to Paris =

- Genre: Reality
- Starring: Paris Hilton
- Theme music composer: Kari Kimmel
- Opening theme: "Taking a Ride"
- Country of origin: United States
- Original language: English
- No. of seasons: 1
- No. of episodes: 8

Production
- Executive producers: Arthur Smith; Jamie Freed; Kent Weed; Paris Hilton; Rick Hilton
- Running time: 42 minutes
- Production companies: A. Smith & Co. Productions

Original release
- Network: Oxygen
- Release: June 1 – July 20, 2011

The World According to Paris is an American reality television series focusing on the daily life of Paris Hilton. It aired on Oxygen from June 1, to July 20, 2011. On August 23, 2011, it was announced that Oxygen did not renew the series for a second season.

== Overview ==
The World According to Paris focuses on Hilton's daily life as well as her relationships with family, friends and then-boyfriend Cy Waits. It also features her court-ordered community service stemming from her arrest in Las Vegas, Nevada for cocaine possession and the planning of her 30th birthday party.

== Cast ==
- Paris Hilton
- Brooke Mueller
- Lexi Dreyfus
- Jennifer Rovero
- Allison Melnick
- Brooke Brinson (daughter of Kim Richards)
- Cy Waits (Hilton's then-boyfriend)
- Kathy Hilton

== Production ==
On September 30, 2010, it was announced that Oxygen had greenlighted a reality television series revolving around Paris Hilton. The project was produced by A. Smith & Co. Productions. Arthur Smith, Kent Weed, Paris Hilton, Richard Hilton and Jamie Freed served as executive producers. Filming took place from November 2010 to February 2011. On August 23, 2011, Oxygen cancelled the series after its first season.

== Episodes ==
| No. | Title | Original release date | U.S. viewers (millions) |
|---|---|---|---|
| 1 | "Breaking and Entering" | June 1, 2011 | 0.409 |
Paris moves into sister Nicky's house after a man breaks into her home. Meanwhile, a text message from an ex jeopardizes her romance with Cy.
| 2 | "Brooke's Breakdown" | June 8, 2011 | 0.227 |
Paris and Cy set Brooke up on a blind date with Marco Andretti, but the evening takes an unforeseen twist.
| 3 | "Vegas Virgin" | June 15, 2011 | 0.349 |
Paris, Jennifer, Allison, and Paris's cousin Brooke take Lexi to Las Vegas, Nevada, but things get dicey when a feud erupts between Lexi and Allison.
| 4 | "New Year, Old Drama" | June 22, 2011 | 0.223 |
Paris and Cy's New Year's Eve trip to Cabo San Lucas ends in a fight. Brooke leaves rehab to be with her family in Aspen, but is haunted by a notorious fight with Charlie Sheen.
| 5 | "Hola, Baby?" | June 29, 2011 | 0.372 |
Kathy and Paris's cousin Brooke try to help Paris lose weight before her trip to Madrid to announce the launch of her motorcycle racing team. The unflattering photos of Paris at Madrid spark rumors.
| 6 | "Paris, We Have A Problem" | July 6, 2011 | 0.226 |
Jennifer and Paris's cousin Brooke suspect that Lexie is still writing scripts for adult films, and talk Paris into spying on her.
| 7 | "Off the Wagon" | July 13, 2011 | 0.260 |
Having been set up on another blind date by Paris and Cy, Brooke breaks her sobriety, and winds up spending the night with Charlie.
| 8 | "Every Day is My Birthday" | July 20, 2011 | 0.274 |
Paris plans her birthday bashes, tries to reconcile with Brooke, and contemplates marrying Cy.

== Reception ==
=== Critical response ===
Entertainment Weekly gave the series a "D", stating that, unlike Keeping Up with the Kardashians, it "fails to deliver any frothy fun and the star comes across as completely unlikable". Alessandra Stanley of The New York Times writes that Paris comes off as "a Sony Walkman in an iPod era, a Friendster in the age of Facebook." Brian Lowry of Variety writes the show reeks of hypocrisy: "Paris laments how the paparazzi intrude on her life, and then she allows a camera crew to watch her bathe", and sticks to her "old tricks" like "showing up for court-ordered community service in Louboutin high heels." Melissa Coleman of The Shizz writes that Hilton's attempt to be seen as a serious businesswoman backfires: "If Hilton thinks that insulting her friends, whining to her boyfriend to get her way, and refusing to lift a finger will portray her as a serious businesswoman, she's delusional." Radio personality Howard Stern called it "the greatest reality show I ever saw because I've never seen a human being so devoid of any humanity. There is nothing in Paris Hilton that indicates that there's a heart or a soul; she is, I said, vomitous." Hilton and her mother later requested to appear on The Howard Stern Show but backed out afterwards; Stern speculated that they asked for the interview upon hearing that he called it his favorite reality show, then learned of the context in which he said it and rescinded the offer.

=== Viewership ===
The series' eight-week run averaged only 293,000 viewers and a 0.2 rating among adults 18-49, making it Oxygen's least-watched series of 2011.
