= Ron Jones (businessman) =

British businessman and executive chair (born 1948)

Ron Jones (born 1948) is a British businessman and executive chair of Tinopolis, one of the UK's largest television production companies.

Previously a partner in the accounting and consultancy firm Arthur Andersen. He was a founder of Tinopolis in 1990 and has led the company since that time. Jones took the company public in 2005 and this led to a rapid expansion by acquisition, including a hostile takeover of the largest listed production company at that time, The Television Corporation PLC. In 2008 Jones and his management team bought the company back in partnership with Vitruvian Partners, a private equity company.
