= Human vs Hamster =

2024 reality television show

- Genre: Game show
- Presented by: Sarah Sherman, Kyle Brandt
- Country of origin: United States
- Original language: English
- No. of seasons: 1
- No. of episodes: 8

Production
- Producers: Chip Gaines; Joanna Gaines; Allison Page
- Running time: 38–45 minutes
- Production companies: A. Smith & Co., Magnolia Network

Original release
- Network: Max
- Release: November 21, 2024

Human vs Hamster is a reality competition show on the streaming service Max, produced by Chip and Joanna Gaines' Magnolia Network. The eight episodes of its first season were released on November 21, 2024. It is hosted by Sarah Sherman and Kyle Brandt and features Brian Balthazar as the show's "resident hamster enthusiast".

== Game play ==
Each episode features two pairs of humans, each grouped by a shared profession (nurses, firefighters, flight attendants) or hobby (pub trivia competitors, beauty pageant entrants, magicians). The human pairs compete in a series of challenges — some against one another, but most against one of the "Hamstars", a group of 10 hamsters with American Gladiator-style identities. The physical challenges are timed and scaled to both human and hamster sizes. The Hamstars are named Ham, Warrior, the Professor, Shadow, Gnasher, Romeo, Lightning, Kevin, Diamond, and Astro.

Human teams receive $1,000 for winning a challenge, and the team that wins the most money advances to the Habitrail-inspired finale, Escape the Cage, which pits a team member against a hamster in a multistage obstacle course.

== Production ==
Human vs Hamster was one of four unscripted series sold by Magnolia Network to Max, described as "ambitious large-scale competitions" and "out-of-the-box social experiments". Chip Gaines said the show was inspired by seeing Jason Kelce celebrating shirtless after a touchdown scored by his brother Travis Kelce in a January 2024 NFL playoff game. However, the show was already casting contestants more than a month before the game.

The show was packaged by A. Smith & Co., known for similar reality competition shows such as Floor Is Lava and American Ninja Warrior. Episodes were taped in the Scarborough district of Toronto.

== Episodes ==
| No. | Title | Original release date |
|---|---|---|
| 1 | "Teachers and Nurses" | November 21, 2024 |
| 2 | "Trivia Kings and Volunteer Queens" | November 21, 2024 |
| 3 | "Weekend Warriors and Theater Kids" | November 21, 2024 |
| 4 | "Wrestlers and Lawyers" | November 21, 2024 |
| 5 | "Rhode Island Firefighters and New Jersey Firefighters" | November 21, 2024 |
| 6 | "Magicians and Dancers" | November 21, 2024 |
| 7 | "Flight Attendants and Tooth Fairies" | November 21, 2024 |
| 8 | "Caroling Elves and Christmas Candy Clerks" | November 21, 2024 |

== Reception ==
Human vs Hamster received positive reviews. Decider's Joel Keller rated the show a "Stream It" (as opposed to a "Skip It"): "Don't get us wrong: Human Vs. Hamster is silly as hell. But it's fun to watch, and host Sarah Sherman takes the show just as seriously as it deserves to be taken." The critic Andy Dehnart called it "a seriously silly throwback to '80s and '90s game shows" that "consistently delivers a solid mix of comedy and challenges".

Tara Ariano from Cracked said the show "delivers exactly what you would probably hope from such a goofy title": "There are lots of reasons to root against humans at this point in history. Human vs. Hamster is arguably the most socially acceptable and low-stakes reason to do it, and offers the fuzziest alternative to root for". As Gail Sherman of Boing Boing put it, "Everything is terrible right now, and humans trash-talking hamsters about a hamster-ball bowling competition is just hilarious".
