= Kyle Brandt =

American sports journalist

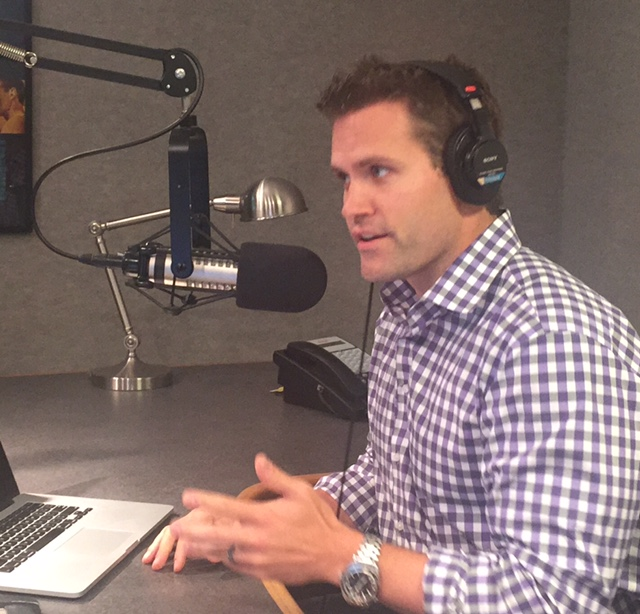
- Brandt on the Jim Rome Show in 2015
- Born: January 24, 1979 (age 47); Hinsdale, Illinois, U.S.
- Occupations: Television/radio host, producer, actor, media personality
- Years active: 2002–present
- Spouse: Brooke Brandt
- Football career

No. 34 – Princeton Tigers
- Position: Running back

Career information
- High school: Stevenson High School (Lincolnshire, Illinois)
- College: Princeton (1997–2000)

Kyle Robert Brandt (born January 24, 1979) is an American television host, media personality, and actor. He is one of the hosts of Good Morning Football on NFL Network.

He was executive producer of The Jim Rome Show from 2009 until 2016. Before that he played Philip Kiriakis on the NBC soap opera Days of Our Lives and was part of the cast of The Real World: Chicago on MTV. He was also a host on the game show Frogger.

== Early life and education ==
Brandt attended Stevenson High School in Lincolnshire, Illinois, a northern suburb of Chicago and graduated in 1997. He was the school's all-time leading rusher playing football. He attended Princeton University and was a three-year starter at running back and kick returner there. While the president of the Beta Theta Pi fraternity, he became interested in acting and entertainment. He participated in local theater and acted in numerous plays on campus. He wrote his senior thesis on the creative process of adapting books into films. He graduated in 2001 with a degree in English.

== The Real World ==
During the spring of 2001, Brandt was selected from more than 50,000 applicants to be a cast member on MTV's The Real World: Chicago, the 11th season of The Real World. During the show, he and his castmates worked as lifeguards on North Avenue Beach. After the show, Brandt moved to Los Angeles to pursue acting.

== Days of Our Lives ==
From 2003 to 2006, Brandt portrayed Philip Kiriakis on the soap opera, Days of Our Lives. As a U.S. Marine, Kiriakis' storylines included saving his girlfriend from mercenaries, as well as being tortured as a POW and losing his leg in battle.

== The Jim Rome Show ==
In 2007, Brandt became a producer and writer on the nationally syndicated radio show, The Jim Rome Show, hosted by Jim Rome. In 2009, he became executive producer of the show and in 2011 he began regularly hosting as a fill-in host. He has interviewed Peyton Manning, Troy Polamalu, Dana White, Vince Vaughn, Adam Carolla, Rob Riggle, and others. Brandt's final day on the program was on July 22, 2016. Then he joined NFL Network's revamped morning show.

== CBS Sports Network ==
From 2013 to 2015, Brandt regularly appeared on Jim Rome's daily television show on CBS Sports Network, Rome. He hosted a segment every Friday called "The Sixer" previewing the upcoming weekend in sports, entertainment, and covering lifestyle stories. On Halloween of 2014, Brandt guest hosted a special edition of Rome, doing the show from the perspective of Han Solo. From 2012 to 2015, Brandt was a producer and writer for Jim Rome on Showtime until it was canceled in 2015.

== NFL Network ==
On July 19, 2016, it was announced that Brandt would be one of the hosts of Good Morning Football, a daily morning show on NFL Network beginning August 1. While on Good Morning Football, Brandt became known for his hype videos, particularly in favor of the Buffalo Bills and Cleveland Browns.

== Other media ==
In August 2020, Brandt began hosting the interview podcast 10 Questions With Kyle Brandt for The Ringer Podcast Network exclusively on Spotify. The show is a hybrid trivia and interview show with athletes and celebrities competing while answering questions about their lives and careers. The first episode was released on August 12 and featured Aaron Rodgers as the guest. In August 2022, Brandt began hosting the podcast " Kyle Brandt's Basement", produced by ESPN and Omaha Productions, Peyton Manning's production company. In 2024, Brandt served as co-host of the Max reality competition show Human vs Hamster with Sarah Sherman. Brandt is also a reoccurring guest on the Rewatchables podcast hosted by Bill Simmons where they frequently discuss action movies.
