= Daniel Kucan =

American interior designer and actor

Daniel Charles Kucan (born October 16, 1970) is an American carpenter, artist, interior designer, actor, writer, and television personality on the Emmy Award-winning TV series Extreme Makeover: Home Edition.

== Early life ==
Kucan was born and raised in Las Vegas, Nevada, and then attended New York University. He has two older brothers, Michael and Joseph. He was a member of the Las Vegas Rainbow Company Children's Theatre company. His parents, Ken and Genevieve, worked as public school teachers. He began acting in community and semi-professional theater at the age of 7 and was a member of a theater training conservatory from then until he graduated at the age of 18. After NYU, he toured Japan with a circus type show based on the movies of George Lucas. After which, he returned to New York and worked as a performer until 1999, when he moved to Los Angeles.

== Career ==
=== Design ===
After graduating, Kucan moved back to California and became the lead designer for Hollywood's Mortise and Tenon and founded the Raw City Home Lounge design team.

From 2005-2006, Daniel was the resident carpenter on Extreme Makeover: Home Edition, and was known for building in recycled and renewable materials, often resulting in unique compositions of off-beat character.

Subsequently he hosted the Home & Garden Television series "Desperate Spaces" along with Lise Simms.

From 2012 to 2013 he co-hosted the A&E networks "Sell this House: Extreme" along with Tanya Memme.

He has produced television for Bravo, A&E, HGTV, and OWN.

=== Acting ===
Daniel appears alongside his brother, Joseph D. Kucan, in Command & Conquer: Tiberian Sun, as GDI officer Jake McNeil as well as a series of other characters.

Daniel has appeared in some form in every installment of the Command & Conquer series. In Command & Conquer 3: Kane's Wrath, Daniel appears in a video clip as a GDI general who briefly taunts the player. He also appears in a cutscene of Emperor: Battle for Dune, portraying a Fremen soldier.

In Los Angeles, he has starred in several small independent feature films, including Schooled, as well as made television appearances in guest starring roles. He also appeared alongside Carol Kane at the Geffen theater in the play "He Hunts". He is currently on the board of directors for the Veteran's Center for the Performing Arts.

Kucan appeared on Conspiracy Theory with Jesse Ventura on truTV, where he was enlisted by Ventura as "the resident skeptic."

=== Writing ===
Kucan is the author of the novel Full Contact: The Collected Stories. He has also written blogs for his theater company A Public Fit, as well as The Huffington Post, The Discerning Brute, and Mortise & Tenon.

== Personal life ==
He is currently living with his wife and his two dogs in Los Angeles, California, and is an expert in at least two different Chinese martial arts, and occasionally fights competitively.

He is well known in the Los Angeles area as a kickboxing and MMA teacher in various gyms including Equinox.

Daniel Kucan is the brother of video game developer and actor Joseph D. Kucan. They co-founded a theater company, A Public Fit, based in Las Vegas, Nevada.
