= Kent Weed =

American television director (born 1962)

- Born: April 26, 1962 (age 64); Hollywood, California, U.S.
- Education: Notre Dame High School
- Occupation: TV Director/producer

Kent Weed (born April 26, 1962) is an American television director and producer and co-founder of A. Smith & Co. Productions. Weed is known for his television work in the talk show, reality, game show, and a variety of genres spanning shows such as American Ninja Warrior, Hell’s Kitchen, Unsung, Paradise Hotel, and Trading Spaces.

== Early life ==
Weed was born in Hollywood, California, and grew up in Studio City. He became interested in entertainment at a young age when he worked on music videos with his father, Gene, who was a famous disc jockey and successful producer and director for Dick Clark Productions. Following his father’s lead, Weed began his career in radio in 1980 programming music for 200 secondary market radio stations and producing radio specials for a company called Total Services Inc. Kent attended high school at Notre Dame High School and went on to spend two years at Los Angeles Valley College, before giving up school to pursue a career in the entertainment industry.

== Career ==
Weed began working in television production in his early twenties, heading a cable production company and producing more than 300 hours of programming each year. His career shifted toward directing when he got his big break at 27 years old when he was hired to direct The Smothers Brothers' thanksgiving special and then went on to more variety format shows: The World’s Greatest Magic for NBC, in addition to worldwide events like Farm Aid for ABC and magic specials including Lance Burton, Champions of Magic, Wildest Magic on Earth, and Houdini's Secrets Unlocked. In the 90s, Weed began his journey into talk shows, comedies and game shows, with The Dennis Prager Show, The Newz, Roundhouse, and To Tell The Truth. He also started working in reality television during its early years with shows like Pure Insanity, Made in the USA, and Fantasies of the Stars.

In 1994, Weed created his own production company, W.A.V.E. Productions. The full-service production company produced dance and music videos, in addition to infomercials and the variety show Paris by Night. Weed also directed and produced the famous Michael Jackson music video "Earth Song" shot at the World Music Awards. Weed has also worked with numerous top talents in the music world, including Shakira, Mariah Carey, Diana Ross, P Diddy, Celine Dion, Shania Twain, and Brad Paisley.

In 2000, Weed moved on from W.A.V.E. Productions and founded A. Smith & Co. Productions with Arthur Smith. As executive producer on all the company’s projects, Weed produced the Emmy and People's Choice Award-nominated hit show Hell's Kitchen, along with Kitchen Nightmares, American Ninja Warrior, Team Ninja Warrior, I Survived a Japanese Game Show, Conspiracy Theory with Jesse Ventura, Full Throttle Saloon, Unsung, Unsung Hollywood, American Gangster, Pros vs. Joes, UFC Countdown, The Swan, and Trading Spaces.

Weed also directed Crash Course for ABC, as well as Skating with Celebrities, I Married a Stranger and Gordon Ramsay: Cookalong Live for Fox.

== Awards, honors and affiliations ==
In 2009, Weed received a Directors Guild of America nomination for I Survived a Japanese Game Show, a DGA nomination for Spartan: Ultimate Team Challenge in 2017, and won the international Rose d’Or award for best reality show and best overall show.

Weed serves as a member of the Emmy reality executive peer committee and is on the board of trustees for the Waterkeeper Alliance. Weed is also part of the leadership circle of the Dream Foundation.
