= Conspiracy Theory with Jesse Ventura =

American television series (2009–2012)

- Opening title card
- Genre: Reality
- Presented by: Jesse Ventura
- Starring: June Sarpong; Michael Braverman; Alex Piper(season 1 & 2); Daniel Kucan (season 2); Sean Stone (season 3) Tyrell Ventura (season 3)
- Country of origin: United States
- No. of seasons: 3
- No. of episodes: 22

Production
- Executive producers: Arthur Smith; Barry Bloom; Burt Kearns (showrunner); Kevin Burns; Frank Sinton; Jesse Ventura; Kent Weed; Michael Braverman; Robyn Hutt
- Running time: ~43 minutes
- Production companies: A. Smith & Company Productions; Braverman Bloom

Original release
- Network: truTV
- Release: December 2, 2009 – December 17, 2012

Conspiracy Theory with Jesse Ventura is an American television series hosted by Jesse Ventura and broadcast on truTV. It ran for three seasons from 2009 to 2012.

== Format ==
Former Navy Underwater Demolition Team (UDT) member, professional wrestler, actor and Governor of Minnesota Jesse Ventura examines various conspiracy theories on subjects such as global warming, the September 11 attacks, secret societies, government surveillance and secret weapons projects.

In the first season, Ventura teams up with a group of investigators consisting of skeptic Alex Piper, reporter June Sarpong and investigator Michael Braverman. In season two, Piper is replaced by investigator Daniel Kucan in a few episodes. In season three, Ventura's son, Tyrel Ventura, and Oliver Stone's son, Sean Stone, are part of the investigative team.

== Ratings and reviews ==
The premiere episode was watched by 1.635 million viewers, TruTV's biggest audience for a new series launch. The next two episodes were watched by 1.586 million and 1.301 million viewers. Over the first three episodes the series averaged 1.5 million viewers, up 60% from the same time slot a year before. During January the show averaged 1.6 million viewers, helping truTV deliver its biggest month ever in prime time.

Critics who have reviewed the show include Linda Stasi of New York Post, who called it "mindless, good fun and a hoot to watch aging action stars still taking action", and Robert Lloyd of the Los Angeles Times, who wrote, "Whatever truth is out there, it's filtered here through what is arranged more as an adventure series than a documentary."

== Controversy ==
=== "Police State" criticism ===
An episode from season two entitled "Police State" caused some controversy when it investigated allegations that various prison-like facilities built around the country that are operated by the Federal Emergency Management Agency (FEMA) will be used during martial law for the internment of citizens who are deemed a threat to national security. Officials have said the facilities are emergency FEMA camps for the housing of civilians displaced by natural disasters. U.S. Representative Steve Cohen from Tennessee, a co-sponsor of a bill which aimed to create temporary FEMA camps for the housing of people affected by hurricanes or earthquakes in his district, was interviewed for the show.

Shortly after the episode aired, Cohen called for the removal of this program from truTV's lineup. He called the episode an "outrageous distortion and an outright lie", as well as "dangerous and irresponsible". He said "when the media purposely distort the facts to create confusion and mislead people, they must be held accountable. Unless we actively debunk false and misleading reports, we risk leaving the public with a dangerously skewed vision of this country." Cohen said he was "shocked and appalled" that Time Warner would air a program "so full of inaccuracies and irresponsible distortions."

Another allegation brought up in the episode focused on a private facility outside Covington, Georgia, that was stockpiling thousands of plastic bins alleged to be used as coffins for mass burials.

In a response to the criticism, Misty Skedgell, a Turner spokesperson, described Conspiracy Theory as an "entertainment program that appears on an entertainment network." The "Police State" episode has been shown only once, owing largely to the controversy surrounding the content of the episode.

=== Production issues ===
After two seasons of the show, the creation of future episodes was in doubt when, on January 25, 2011, the Drudge Report announced that Ventura had filed a lawsuit against the Department of Homeland Security and the Transportation Security Administration (TSA), for what he calls "warrant-less and suspicion-less scans and body searches." Ventura, who has a titanium hip replacement, claimed that he sets off metal detectors and is always pulled out of line for lengthy pat-downs. The day of the announcement, Alex Jones, a consultant and frequent guest, said on his show that he had witnessed a pat-down of Ventura at the Atlanta International Airport while filming for Conspiracy Theory, during which Ventura loudly protested that "America is turning into East Germany." Jones said Ventura, who flew two to three times a week for Conspiracy Theory, refuses to fly commercially again, a vow he reiterated after his lawsuit against the TSA was dismissed in November 2011.

In May 2013, Ventura confirmed that the show has been discontinued and there will be no fourth season.

=== Unshown "TSA" episode ===
In a November 2012 appearance on Alex Jones's Infowars conspiracy-theory radio show, Ventura claimed that he and his team filmed an episode contending that Transportation Security Administration full-body scanners are carcinogenic but that the episode did not air on the instructions of TruTV network executives. Ventura contended that persons unknown "influenced truTV to do that."

== List of episodes ==
=== Season one (2009–10) ===
No. overall	No. in season	Title	Original release date
1	1	"HAARP"	December 2, 2009
Ventura visits HAARP (the High-Frequency Active Auroral Research Program) in Gakona, Alaska to uncover the alleged truth behind rumors that it is being used as a weather modification weapon, an instrument for mind control, or both.
2	2	"9/11"	December 9, 2009
Ventura investigates the rumors of a possible cover-up of the black box recordings from the airliners involved in the September 11 attacks which could contain evidence that 9/11 may have been an inside job.
3	3	"Global Warming"	December 16, 2009
Ventura looks at some of the purported evidence that man-made global warming is an elitist scam, and the money trail leads him to the doorstep of an elusive billionaire and a former UN adviser residing in Shanghai.
4	4	"Big Brother"	December 23, 2009
Ventura looks into theories about how far the U.S. Government has gone, in the name of national security, to keep an eye on its citizens – including contracting private companies to spy on people and giving special incentives to InfraGard members who report suspicious activity.
5	5	"Secret Societies"	December 30, 2009
Ventura infiltrates the Bilderberg Group – a very secretive, annual meeting of elitists who gather in luxury hotels, under heavy security, and supposedly plan the strategies for world domination, including a "voluntary forced vaccine". The location and attendees of these secretive events are often posted online. Although most of the episodes of Conspiracy Theory have been rerun, this episode has been shown only once, owing largely to the controversy surrounding the content of the episode.
6	6	"Manchurian Candidate"	January 6, 2010
Ventura and his crew investigates rumors that the CIA has restarted the project to turn ordinary citizens into programmed assassins and super soldiers through hypnosis, experimental drugs, torture and other methods. He also meets a man who claims to be a real-life Manchurian Candidate.
7	7	"Apocalypse 2012"	January 13, 2010
Some believe the world is heading for disaster in 2012 and Ventura looks into rumors that the U.S. Government has a doomsday plan for saving the elite while leaving the rest of the population to fend for itself. Ventura also checks out the Denver International Airport where mysterious artwork displayed throughout seems to depict a "road map" of plans for the Apocalypse.

=== Season two (2010) ===
No. overall	No. in season	Title	Original release date
8	1	"Plum Island"	October 15, 2010
Ventura investigates the secretive Plum Island Animal Disease Center located off the coast of Long Island, New York, which has been suspected as being a bio-weapons research center responsible for the release of Lyme disease and other deadly viruses. He also learns that the facility is to be moved to Kansas, into the heart of cattle country, which could spell disaster if a dangerous contaminant was released into the nation's food supply.
9	2	"Area 51"	October 29, 2010
Ventura treks into the Nevada desert to monitor the activity of Area 51, the most secretive military complex in the country and believed by many in the UFO community to be reverse engineering alien technology. He also interviews two Area 51 watchdogs who claim they were targeted by the Joint Terrorism Task Force.
10	3	"Wall Street"	November 5, 2010
Ventura interviews Goldman Sachs whistleblowers and infiltrates a group of Wall Street elitists to find out what caused the 2008 financial crisis, and to see who has the power to manipulate the stock market and the prices of oil, and precious metals.
11	4	"Police State"	November 12, 2010
Ventura is joined by conspiracy-talk radio host Alex Jones and looks into the plans and procedures in place by the government for declaring martial law. They investigate new law enforcement "fusion centers" that may be in control of rumored internment camps for rounding up U.S. citizens who are deemed a threat to national security. Note: This episode was removed for a time from the second season episode list on TruTV.com after a controversy.
12	5	"JFK Assassination"	November 19, 2010
Ventura reviews a set of supposedly classified CIA documents that connect the John F. Kennedy assassination to the Watergate scandal that brought down Richard Nixon, and possible involvement by other U.S. presidents such as Gerald Ford and Lyndon B. Johnson. He interviews Lee Harvey Oswald's widow Marina Oswald Porter to gain more insight into the theory that Oswald was a CIA operative who had been framed by his handlers.
13	6	"Great Lakes (aka The Worldwide Water Conspiracy)"	December 3, 2010
Ventura looks into the prospects of "Blue Gold" and why corporations and the super-rich are buying up water rights around the world in what could be a plan in controlling nations and their masses. He looks into evidence that these tactics are going on in North America in what could be a literal theft of the Great Lakes.
14	7	"The Gulf Oil Spill (aka Louisiana Oil Spill)"	December 10, 2010
Ventura looks into rumors that the Deepwater Horizon oil spill was a staged event by companies like BP and Halliburton to reap profits from the cleanup, as well as administer toxic agents into the Gulf coast waters as part of a larger depopulation program, inspired by the Hurricane Katrina disaster, to modify the world's ocean currents and weather, and to target the Louisiana coastline to gain complete control of its oil reserves.
15	8	"Pentagon"	December 17, 2010
Ventura investigates the theory that a missile, and not a hijacked airliner, hit The Pentagon during the September 11 attacks. Questioned are issues such as the lack of surveillance video released by the FBI; debris and damage inconsistent with a jetliner crash; the extreme difficulty of crashing a jetliner at high speed into a specific ground target by an amateur pilot, and links to a possible cover-up of $2.3 trillion of unaccounted taxpayer money announced by then Secretary of Defense, Donald Rumsfeld, just a day before the attacks.

=== Season three (2012) ===
No. overall	No. in season	Title	Original release date
16	1	"Reptilian"	November 7, 2012
Ventura looks into one of Time's "Top 10" ranked conspiracies – that some world leaders and other influential people are really shape-shifting lizard beings from another planet who are manipulating the world in human form. Tyrel and Shawn interview a self-proclaimed hybrid, while Jesse reviews video of alleged shape-shifting in progress, searches for a rumored alien base in Dulce, New Mexico, and interviews David Icke who has promoted the conspiracy, .
17	2	"Death Ray"	November 14, 2012
Ventura looks into rumors that the government is using directed-energy weapon technology, not only for strategic missile defense, but also as a tool for assassination and possible false flag operations. Ventura feels he's on to something when he learns numerous people involved in the project have died under mysterious circumstances, (including whistle-blower Fred Bell, who died two days after an interview), and a theory that a ray may have been used to disintegrate and collapse the World Trade Center towers on 9/11.
18	3	"Time Travel"	November 21, 2012
Ventura investigates rumors that the government has developed secret time travel technology beginning with the Philadelphia Experiment and Montauk Project and that it has been used as a weapon to alter historical events. Later he meets Andrew D. Basiago, a man who claims that as a child, he was "chrononaut" working for his father at the Los Alamos National Laboratory on a DARPA experiment called "Project Pegasus" and was sent back in time to meet historical figures such as George Washington and Abraham Lincoln.
19	4	"Ozarks"	November 26, 2012
Ventura looks into rumors that the elite are building fortified retreats and underground bunkers in remote areas of the country in preparation for a doomsday event. He travels to Ozark, Missouri to investigate the construction of an alleged 75,000 sq. ft., "single-family," fortified mansion owned by a satellite surveillance mogul and government defense contractor. Later, Ventura and his team are guided by a local informant to a massive underground warehouse facility, complete with railroad access, that is located in nearby Springfield, Missouri.
20	5	"Skinwalker"	December 3, 2012
Ventura looks into various corporations that are filling the void left by NASA and continuing space research and technology under private enterprise – some of which may be used to weaponize space. His leads focus him on billionaire aerospace entrepreneur Robert Bigelow who purchased Utah's mysterious "Skinwalker Ranch" – a site with a long history of claims of paranormal activity, specifically UFOs, leading to rumors that Bigelow is reverse engineering his own alien technology. While Tyrell and Shawn have an unexplained encounter near the ranch, Ventura seeks answers from Bigelow himself.
21	6	"Manimal"	December 10, 2012
Ventura looks into various alleged human-animal hybrid experiments, beginning with a ranch suspected of breeding animals with human organs used for medical research, and when slaughtered, could end up mixed with animals later processed for human consumption. Afterward he is led to the gates of Yerkes National Primate Research Center in Atlanta, Georgia, where an animal rights crusader believes a real-life "Planet of the Apes" is being created by the government to secretly breed "humanzee" super-soldiers.
22	7	"Brain Invaders"	December 17, 2012
Ventura interviews a group of so-called "targeted individuals" (or "TIs") – people who claim that they are being manipulated and tortured by mind-control signals after they have spoken out against the government. He further looks into the technology that could be behind these attacks, such as microwave transmitting GWEN towers, and meets with insiders who claim to have worked on and developed the technology for the government that began with Project MKUltra.
