= Skating with Celebrities =

- Created by: ITV
- Written by: Arthur Smith; Michael X. Ferrard
- Directed by: Kent Weed
- Presented by: Summer Sanders; Scott Hamilton
- Judges: Dorothy Hamill; John Nicks; Mark Lund
- Country of origin: United States
- No. of seasons: 1
- No. of episodes: 7

Production
- Executive producers: Arthur Smith; Kent Weed
- Producer: Terry Coyle
- Running time: 42 minutes
- Production companies: A. Smith & Co. Productions

Original release
- Network: Fox
- Release: January 18 – March 2, 2006

Skating with Celebrities is an American figure skating talent show that began airing on Fox on January 18, 2006. The show also aired in Australia on Network Ten in early 2006 and in New Zealand in October 2008. The show was the American version of Dancing on Ice, which also aired in the United Kingdom during the same time period.

Skating with Celebrities was met with far less success than the British original and lasted only one season. The show was at the center of a controversy involving allegations that one of the competing couples, Lloyd Eisler and Kristy Swanson, were involved in an extramarital affair. The duo defeated the team of television personality Jillian Barberie and American pairs champion John Zimmerman to win the show's first - and only - championship. On March 2, 2006, production was cancelled, and it was announced that the show would not return for a second season.

== Synopsis ==
Following the success of ABC's Dancing with the Stars, Fox started airing its own celebrity competition revolving around skating instead of dancing.

The show produced by Rob Dustin paired six champion figure skaters with six celebrities who have various degrees of skating experience, including Deborah Gibson, a novice; Dave Coulier, who played ice hockey in Canada; Kristy Swanson, who had taken lessons as a child; and Jillian Barberie, who had training as a competitive figure skater into her teens. Each team was composed of one man and one woman together as a pair, and they were to perform a new routine during each episode. As part of their new routines, each celebrity had to demonstrate a specific figure skating skill.

Each pair received scores for technical merit and artistic impression from a trio of judges. The scores were added together to create a cumulative score. No teams were eliminated in the first episode.

== Cast ==
=== Celebrities and their partners ===
Celebrity	Notability (known for)	Professional partner	Status
Todd Bridges	Diff'rent Strokes actor	Jenni Meno	Eliminated 1st
Debbie Gibson	Singer-songwriter & Broadway actress	Kurt Browning	Eliminated 2nd
Dave Coulier	Full House actor & comedian	Nancy Kerrigan	Eliminated 3rd
Caitlyn Jenner (Note: Jenner still identified as male during the competition and was identified as Bruce Jenner during the program.)	Olympic decathlete	Tai Babilonia	Third place
Jillian Barberie	Former Fox NFL Sunday host	John Zimmerman	Runner-up
Kristy Swanson	Film & television actress	Lloyd Eisler	Winner

=== Hosts & judges ===
The show was hosted by Olympic champion swimmer Summer Sanders and Olympic gold medal figure skater Scott Hamilton and judged by Olympic figure skating legend Dorothy Hamill, skating coach John Nicks, and journalist Mark Lund. Former pair skater Randy Gardner served as choreographer.

=== Averages ===
Technical and Artistic are one skate each

Rank by average	Place	Couple	Total	Number of performances	Average
1	2	Jillian & John	380.4	14	27.2
2	1	Kristy & Lloyd	378.9	14	27.1
3	3	Bruce & Tai	257	10	25.7
4	4	Dave & Nancy	199.1	8	24.9
5	5	Debbie & Kurt	144.2	6	24
6	6	Todd & Jennie	95.6	4	23.9

== Episodes ==
=== Episode 1 ===
The Featured Skill was Spins. In this episode, teams skated to music from the movies. During rehearsal, Dave Coulier, a hockey player, was frustrated at the fact that he kept tripping in his figure skates, so he filed off the toe picks to make them more like hockey skates.

Lloyd Eisler and Kristy Swanson ran into their first complication as a team: Swanson, as a left-hander, spun in the opposite direction from Eisler. Choreographer Renée Roca told Eisler that they would simply have to choreograph the routine to take advantage of the difference rather than have each try to adapt to the other's spinning. The awkwardness of this decision showed as their shaky routine landed them in last place.

Todd Bridges and Jenni Meno skated to music from "Wild Wild West." During their practice video, Meno had a very hard time with dancing, and video from practice sessions showed awkward and unrhythmic movements from her. However, during the performance, she pulled off the dance moves quite well and on the beat.

This was the only episode where Jillian Barberie and John Zimmerman had the highest score alone. They tied with Eisler and Swanson in episode 4.

Scores (Nicks/Hamill/Lund/Total)

Pair	Technical	Artistic	Overall
Barberie-Zimmerman	8.4/8.4/9.0/25.8	8.7/8.3/9.0/26.0	51.8
Coulier-Kerrigan	8.2/8.3/7.9/24.4	8.5/8.3/8.1/24.9	49.3
Jenner-Babilonia	8.0/8.1/8.2/24.3	8.1/8.3/8.1/24.5	48.8
Gibson-Browning	7.8/8.0/8.0/23.8	8.0/8.2/8.0/24.2	48.0
Bridges-Meno	7.7/7.9/7.8/23.3	8.0/8.3/8.1/24.4	47.7
Swanson-Eisler	7.9/7.9/8.0/23.8	7.9/7.9/7.9/23.7	47.5

=== Episode 2 ===
The Featured Skill was Synchronized Footwork. The teams skated to 1970s music. Kurt Browning and Deborah Gibson skated to a version of "You're The One That I Want" from the movie Grease with Gibson singing the female vocal part. Judge John Nicks was particularly dismayed with Dave Coulier's seeming lack of grace during their disco routine—among other things, Coulier had a hard time stopping and making quick turns because he had filed off the toe picks from his skates—leading to a rhetorical question: "Where is your feminine side?" Coulier answered, "In my other pants."

Jillian Barberie pulled a groin muscle during rehearsal, the first of many injuries she would suffer during the competition. Todd Sand taught Todd Bridges to lift Jenni Meno above his head, which he did to open their routine. Bridges fell during the routine, however, costing them points and leading to their elimination.

Eisler and Swanson rebounded from last place in the first episode to receive the highest score in this episode.

Scores (Nicks/Hamill/Lund/Total)

Pair	Technical	Artistic	Overall	Cumulative
Barberie-Zimmerman	8.4/8.6/8.2/25.2	8.5/8.4/8.3/25.2	50.4	102.2
Swanson-Eisler	8.5/8.4/8.3/25.2	8.6/8.5/8.4/25.5	50.7	98.2
Jenner-Babilonia	7.9/8.3/8.1/24.3	8.1/8.4/8.2/24.7	49.0	97.8
Coulier-Kerrigan	7.9/8.0/7.8/23.7	7.9/8.0/7.8/23.7	47.4	96.7
Gibson-Browning	7.8/8.2/8.0/24.0	7.9/8.3/8.1/24.3	48.3	96.3
Bridges-Meno (eliminated)	7.9/7.9/7.9/23.7	8.1/8.1/8.0/24.2	47.9	95.6

=== Episode 3 ===
Featured Skill: Unassisted Single-Legged Lunge. The teams skated to Motown music. Dave Coulier and Nancy Kerrigan did their routine in drag—her in a man's suit and mustache, him in a padded suit shaped like a female figure skater's costume and a bouffant wig—as a response to John Nicks' criticism about Coulier's lack of grace that ended in the rhetorical cry, "Where is your feminine side?" The pair's appearance in the routine was very similar to costuming for a routine Lloyd Eisler used to do with his professional partner, Isabelle Brasseur, called "Patricia The Stripper".

Randy Gardner taught Jenner how to support Tai Babilonia in a rudimentary death spiral, a move that garnered them the highest scores of the night.

This was the only episode where neither Barberie/Zimmerman nor Eisler/Swanson finished in first place. John Zimmerman fell going into the last move in his and Barberie's routine, costing them first place.

Eisler and Swanson had two major mistakes that nearly cost them the competition—Swanson tripped during their synchronized footwork segment and fell to the ice, and Eisler smacked her chin against the ice as they went into a combination lift/spin done very close to the ice's surface. Swanson's chin was cut when it hit the ice, prompting judge Dorothy Hamill to ask, "Are you O.K.? That looked like it hurt."

Deborah Gibson had trouble doing the lunge due to an injury, and Kurt Browning had trouble trying to incorporate more traditional pairs elements (particularly lifts) into their routine due to the two of them being so close in size. The difficulties were too much for the team to overcome, and they were eliminated.

Scores (Nicks/Hamill/Lund/Total)

Pair	Technical	Artistic	Overall
Jenner-Babilonia	8.2/8.2/8.5/24.9	8.5/8.3/8.4/25.2	50.1
Barberie-Zimmerman	8.3/8.4/8.4/25.1	8.2/8.2/8.3/24.7	49.8
Coulier-Kerrigan	8.0/8.2/8.2/24.4	8.4/8.4/8.5/25.3	49.7
Swanson-Eisler	7.9/8.2/8.3/24.4	8.2/8.1/8.4/24.7	49.1
Gibson-Browning (eliminated)	7.9/8.1/7.9/23.9	7.9/8.1/8.0/24.0	47.9

=== Episode 4 ===
The Featured Skill was Side-by-side Jumps. The teams skated to Top 40 pop music. Eisler and Swanson and Barberie and Zimmerman tied for first place with the highest scores in the series up to that point. This would be the last time Barberie and Zimmerman would have the high score in the competition.

Both Jillian Barberie and Jenner had to be rushed to the hospital during practice for this round; Barberie suffered a strained rib cartilage during practice when Zimmerman hoisted her into a two-armed "detroiter" lift, and Jenner's toe pick got caught on the ice while practicing spins and fell face-first, resulting in a cut above the eye requiring 16 stitches to close.

Jenner was supporting Tai Babilonia in a pairs glide move in an otherwise uneventful routine when Babilonia realized they were about to run into the "kiss and cry" dais. She quickly stepped up onto the dais and was able to get back onto the ice smoothly, but the misstep cost them points and landed them in third place.

Dave Coulier admitted during practice that he was afraid of falling and getting injured and thus had difficulty learning the required jump. The pair eventually did a single waltz jump at the start of their routine before they went into their skating in order to fit the required element in, and it cost them the competition as their low scores led to their elimination.

Scores (Nicks/Hamill/Lund/Total)

Pair	Technical	Artistic	Overall
Swanson-Eisler	9.3/9.3/9.1/27.7	9.5/9.4/9.3/28.2	55.9
Barberie-Zimmerman	8.9/9.5/9.2/27.6	9.4/9.5/9.4/28.3	55.9
Jenner-Babilonia	9.0/9.2/9.0/27.2	9.0/9.3/9.2/27.5	54.7
Coulier-Kerrigan (eliminated)	8.5/9.1/8.8/26.4	8.4/9.1/8.8/26.3	52.7

=== Episode 5 ===
The Featured Skill was the One-Footed Edge Glide. The teams skated to music selected by the judges for each individual team. The lowest two scoring teams would compete for a spot in the finals in a skate-off. Eisler and Swanson skated a slow, romantic routine that included a one-armed death spiral; the judges gave them the highest scores yet in the series and first place heading into the finals.

Barberie and Zimmerman were criticized for cribbing elements from past routines and for not adding more complex elements (such as the death spiral that both of the other teams had done), and their scores were knocked down accordingly. Meanwhile, Jenner was criticized for letting Tai Babilonia do all the artistic tricks while he merely supported her from move to move. The team's scores were knocked down accordingly as well.

Jenner and Babilonia and Barberie and Zimmerman participated in the final skate-off; the judges selected Barberie and Zimmerman to move on, and Jenner and Babilonia were eliminated.

Scores (Nicks/Hamill/Lund/Total)

Pair	Technical	Artistic	Overall
Swanson-Eisler	9.5/9.5/9.8/28.8	9.8/9.6/9.8/29.2	58.0
Barberie-Zimmerman	9.1/9.3/9.2/27.6	9.3/9.3/9.2/27.8	55.4
Jenner-Babilonia (eliminated in skate-off)	8.9/9.2/9.0/27.1	9.0/9.2/9.1/27.3	54.4

=== Episode 6 Finals, Part 1 ===
The Featured Skills were the Multi-jump sequence, Spin with 4 revolutions, Above-shoulder lift. The teams skated to music of their own choice. The four eliminated teams returned to skate several exhibitions as time-fillers between the two competitive routines.

Barberie and Zimmerman had a major slip-up coming out of a complex above-shoulder lift (Zimmerman lost his grip on Barberie as he was supporting her in a forward-roll dismount and she landed on her bottom rather than on her feet; they recovered just in time to avoid hitting the sideboard); though they recovered to skate the rest of the routine nearly flawlessly, their artistic scores were marked down significantly, putting them into second place at the end of the first part of the finals. Despite this, they still received the highest score they had ever received in the competition.

John Nicks made a point to praise Lloyd Eisler for "finally learning to extend your leg" during a pairs glide element in the routine. Eisler responded good-naturedly that it had only taken "one year of retirement" for him to figure out how to do it.

Scores (Nicks/Hamill/Lund/Subtotal)

Pair	Technical	Artistic	Combined
Swanson-Eisler (leader)	9.7/9.8/9.7/29.2	9.8/9.9/9.8/29.5	58.7
Barberie-Zimmerman	9.7/9.8/9.6/29.1	9.6/9.8/9.8/29.2	58.3

=== Episode 7 Finals, Part 2 ===
The episode featured Free Skates with no required technical elements. The teams skated to music of their own choice.

Before their final competitive programs, each team skated an encore of their favorite routines from the series. Lloyd Eisler managed to lift Kristy Swanson into a one-handed "detroiter" lift-spin as part of a near-flawless final routine that gave them a score of 59 out of a possible 60 points, the highest score in the competition.

Jillian Barberie attempted a single-axel jump but fell on the landing, effectively ending their chances to take the lead. The judges praised the effort and gave them high technical marks, but not enough to overtake Eisler and Swanson's lead. Barberie later said in a joint appearance with Mark Lund that she'd successfully landed 22 axels during practice, most of them in a row as they practiced their final routine, so her fall during the routine itself surprised and disappointed her.

During their victory lap, as Eisler went to lift Swanson overhead, John Zimmerman (who was still on the ice being interviewed by Scott Hamilton) had to duck out of the way to avoid being hit by Swanson's skates. Both teams laughed about the close scrape afterward.

Scores (Nicks/Hamill/Lund/Subtotal)

Pair	Technical	Artistic	Overall
Swanson-Eisler (winner)	9.8/9.9/9.8/29.5	9.8/9.9/9.8/29.5	117.7
Barberie-Zimmerman	9.8/9.8/9.7/29.3	9.9/9.8/9.8/29.5	117.1

== See also ==
- Skating with the Stars
