= Brian Balthazar =

American television personality

Brian Wayne Balthazar is a TV personality and the executive producer and developer of several programs on broadcast and cable television. As a pop culture pundit, journalist, entertainment expert, and trend forecaster he has frequently appeared on television programs and networks including The Today Show on NBC, CNN, HLN, The Wendy Williams Show, VH1, TV Guide Network and more, usually introducers as the editor of the website POPgoesTheWeek.com. He has also hosted specials for HGTV. In summer of 2014 he became co-executive producer of ABC's The View. As a television executive and producer, he was HGTV's network executive overseeing the popular series House Hunters and Flip Or Flop, Flip Or Flop Vegas, and more. Balthazar also launched the fourth hour of the TODAY Show on NBC with Kathie Lee Gifford and Hoda Kotb.

== Early life ==
Balthazar was born Brian Balthaser in Honesdale, Pennsylvania, the son of Theresa (née Dean) and Harrison F. Balthaser, a state trooper. At age eleven, he became interested in theater after being cast in the title role of Oliver in a regional production of the show.

Balthazar graduated from Honesdale High School and went on to attend Syracuse University, where he studied speech communication (now referred to by the college as communication & rhetorical studies.) During part of his college career, he was one of the students who masqueraded as the school's mascot, Otto The Orange.

== Career ==
=== Writing and producing ===
Balthazar struggled with his career path in the early 1990s, taking several short lived jobs, which included that of a publicity assistant for a trance medium, a toll-free customer service agent, and singing and dancing waiter.

In 1999, he took an overnight writing job at Boston NBC affiliate WHDH in Boston, Massachusetts, writing 20-second news stories.

In 2000, Balthazar took a job at MSNBC as a producer, working out of the network's then Secaucus, New Jersey headquarters. In 2001 he became a senior producer. After travelling the world to cover post-9/11 news stories, He left NBC in 2008 to supervise several real estate and design shows for HGTV, where he oversaw and led the creative behind several series including Flip Or Flop, Love it Or List It, Christina On The Coast, and more.

=== Standup comedy ===
During his tenure as a producer, Balthazar enrolled in a standup comedy class as a means of forcing himself to get onstage as a comic. He eventually began performing at New York City comedy clubs at night while producing during the day.

While working as a producer on the Today Show, Balthazar met and worked with Stacy London, the host of TLC's What Not to Wear. At the time she was developing a late night talk show entitled Fashionably Late with Stacy London. At her recommendation, Balthazar met with the show's producers and became the program's warmup comic, taping multiple episodes while continuing to produce for NBC. He went on to be the warmup comic for the 2008 season finale of The Next Food Network Star. and MTV's Man and Wife with Fatman Scoop.

=== On camera ===
In the early stages of Balthazar's on camera career, he occasionally appeared as an offbeat features reporter on both MSNBC and NBC. In 2004, he was an on-the-street satirical correspondent for the 2004 Democratic National Convention for Countdown with Keith Olbermann. In 2006, he profiled Joan Rivers, taking her on a series of online dates for the Today Show. He made several other appearances, primarily in taped segments, during 2006 and 2007.

In 2009, Balthazar launched a pop culture website named POP Goes The Week. As the site's editor, he began appearing as a panelist on The Joy Behar Show and Showbiz Tonight. He frequently returns to MSNBC as a guest entertainment reporter, and sometimes appears on The Wendy Williams Show in the program's 'Scoop' segment. He often appeared on the weekend edition of the Today Show.

Balthazar has appeared on The Dr Oz Show as an on the street and undercover reporter, and appears as a comic on TV Guide Network entertainment specials.

In 2012, he was the host of the HGTV television special I Bought A Famous House. Balthazar was selected as one of the top 50 influential LGBT personalities in media.

In January 2018, he received positive reviews as one of the co-hosts of HGTV's Rose Parade coverage, where he served as the streetside reporter providing an up close look at the parade floats and personalities.

While working at HGTV, he applied his knowledge of home renovation and his personal passion for design and began flipping and renovating homes, which were then featured when he co-hosted the fourth hour of the Today Show.

In 2024, Balthazar served as the "resident hamster enthusiast" on the Max reality competition show Human vs Hamster.

=== Food Network Kitchen ===
Having worked for many years in food retail and catering Balthazar began sharing many of his cocktail and food recipes on social media and the websites, DrThirsty and Snackist. From there, he became one of the personalities teaching live classes on the Food Network Kitchen App, where viewers can cook in real time with the cooks and chefs, asking questions and interacting along the way.

== See also ==
- LGBT culture in New York City
- List of LGBT people from New York City
- New Yorkers in journalism
- NYC Pride March
