= Mark Lund =

American film director (born 1965)

Mark Ashton Lund
- Born: June 6, 1965 (age 61); Holden, Massachusetts, United States
- Occupations: Publisher, television personality, writer and film producer
- Known for: Judge on Skating with Celebrities (2006) Founder and Publisher of International Figure Skating magazine (1993-2004) and Producer and writer of the science fiction short film First World (film)(2007)
- Website: www.markashtonlund.com

Mark Ashton Lund (born June 6, 1965) is an American writer, publisher, television analyst who covers figure skating and a film producer.

He is the author of Frozen Assets (ISBN 0-9721402-0-4), and was the founder and publisher of International Figure Skating Magazine from its inception in 1993 until 2004, when his company, Ashton International Media, Inc., lost control of the magazine in a hostile takeover when Madavor Media purchased its securities from Primedia.

In 2001, Out Magazine named Lund to the OUT 100 list of greatest success stories for that year.

Lund has also made numerous media appearances as an analyst on figure skating, particularly during the 2002 Olympic Winter Games figure skating scandal, where he was an analyst for CNN. He served as a judge on the television show Skating with Celebrities in early 2006. After losing control of International Figure Skating, Lund, who is openly gay, founded another magazine, SCENE, aimed at the gay community.

Lund appeared on Nancy Kerrigan's World of Skating in an episode that aired January 14, 2007 titled "Countdown to Nationals & Road to Glory". His commentary in this episode concerning US men's figure skater Johnny Weir was criticized by several bloggers in the gay community. On March 18, 2008, writer Alan Schwarz used some of Lund's quotes from the broadcast in a New York Times article titled Figure Skating Rivalry Pits Athleticism Against Artistry.

In 2007, Lund appeared as Commander Steven Conner in Star Trek: Odyssey in their pilot episode "Iliad" and produced the science fiction short film First World based on his feature-length script. The script was nominated for screenplay awards at the California Independent Film Festival, Fantastic Planet Film Festival and The Movie Deal.

On August 18, 2013, Lund premiered his first feature film Justice Is Mind at the Capital District Film Festival in Albany, NY. After a limited theatrical run and international premiere the film was released by Filmhub to Amazon Prime on September 26, 2014.

In 2014, Lund appeared on ESPN’s 30 for 30 episode The Price of Gold about the attack on Nancy Kerrigan at the 1994 U.S. Figure Skating Championships in Detroit, MI.

In 2016, Lund wrote Serpentine, a political thriller around the sport of figure skating. To develop interest in the project Lund produced the first ten pages of the script.Serpentine: The Short Program premiered on March 6, 2017, at the Strand Theatre in Clinton, MA.

On March 26, 2021, Lund premiered his second feature film First Signal at the Greenfield Garden Cinemas in Greenfield, MA. After the New Hampshire premiere on April 22, 2021 the film was released by Indie Rights to Amazon Prime on April 26, 2021. The Film First Signal became the winner of the best Sci-fi movie in Beyond the Curve International Film Festival.
