= Welcome to Plathville =

American reality television series (2019–present)

- Genre: Reality television
- Country of origin: United States
- Original language: English
- No. of seasons: 8
- No. of episodes: 89

Production
- Running time: 42–85 minutes
- Production company: A. Smith & Co. Productions

Original release
- Network: TLC
- Release: November 5, 2019 – present

Welcome to Plathville is an American reality television series on TLC that follows the conservative Plath family of southern Georgia. The series premiered on November 5, 2019, and has produced eight seasons as of 2026.

== Overview ==
The series follows the conservative Plath family of southern Georgia, which consists of Kim and Barry Plath and their nine children: Ethan, Hosanna, Micah, Moriah, Lydia, Isaac, Amber, Cassia, and Mercy. Having been raised on an isolated farm under their parents' strict rules, some of the children eventually forge their own paths, causing a major rift in the family.

== Cast ==
The show features 10 of the 11 members of the Plath family (eldest daughter Hosanna does not participate):

- Barry Plath, father and ex-husband of Kim
- Kim Plath, mother and ex-wife of Barry
- Ethan Plath, eldest son
- Micah Plath, middle son
- Moriah Plath, middle daughter
- Lydia Plath, middle daughter
- Isaac Plath, middle son
- Amber Plath, younger daughter
- Cassia Plath, younger daughter
- Mercy Plath, younger daughter

The show also features or featured several partners of the children:

- Olivia Plath, ex-wife of Ethan (seasons 1–7)
- Veronica Peters, ex-girlfriend of Micah (seasons 6–7)
- Zac Wyse, Lydia's husband (seasons 7–present)

== Episodes ==
=== Series overview ===
Season	Episodes	Originally released	
Season	Episodes	First released	Last released
1	6	November 5, 2019	December 10, 2019
2	9	November 10, 2020	January 5, 2021
3	12	August 17, 2021	November 2, 2021
4	13	May 17, 2022	August 2, 2022
5	14	September 5, 2023	December 5, 2023
6	12	July 9, 2024	October 1, 2024
7	11	July 22, 2025	September 30, 2025
8	12	March 31, 2026	June 16, 2026

=== Season 1 (2019) ===
No. overall	No. in season	Title	Original release date
1	1	"Meet the Plaths"	November 5, 2019
The Plath family, led by parents Barry and Kim and featuring eight children, live in rural Georgia with no access to technology, limited sugar and strict rules.
2	2	"Starving for Independence"	November 12, 2019
Kim decides to let Moriah take a trip to San Francisco, where she experiences a newfound freedom. Ethan spends time at the pool and consumes beer with his friends, against his parents' rules.
3	3	"Mom's Gonna Find Out"	November 19, 2019
When Barry and Kim leave the children for a night to celebrate their anniversary, Micah and Lydia are in charge of the house. Ethan and Olivia plan to form their own secular music band with their siblings.
4	4	"No Strings Attached"	November 26, 2019
Ethan, Olivia, Micah and Moriah begin practicing as a band, while Olivia expresses discontent with his parents' treatment of her.
5	5	"Just Look Cool"	December 3, 2019
Moriah decides she wants to attend college, which Kim helps her research. Ethan, Olivia, Micah and Moriah take a trip to the beach.
6	6	"The Big Announcement"	December 10, 2019
Moriah reflects on her upbringing when she goes on an official college tour. Ethan and Olivia invite the family out for dinner, followed by a tense confrontation which ends in Ethan and Olivia removing themselves from the family.

=== Season 2 (2020–2021) ===
No. overall	No. in season	Title	Original release date
7	1	"A Family Divided"	November 10, 2020
After the events at the end of last season, Ethan and Olivia have removed themselves from the family after being denied the opportunity to spend time with Ethan's siblings. However, Kim, Barry and the remaining kids have relocated to a new home near Ethan. Micah and Moriah, kicked out of the house for breaking rules, visit the family to reconcile.
8	2	"My Mystery Man"	November 17, 2020
Micah models in a steaming session with model-friend Helena, while Barry gives Isaac the birds and the bees talk. Moriah goes on her very first date with Max.
9	3	"You Can't Stop the Girl"	November 24, 2020
Olivia gets a body piercing which surprises Ethan, before hosting Moriah and Micah for the Fourth of July. Kim, Barry and the remaining kids head back to the farm to host Australian visitors.
10	4	"Open to Falling in Love"	December 1, 2020
Ethan and Olivia decide to relocate to be further away from the family. The day before a date, Micah crashes his car, while Moriah deals with relationship troubles with Max.
11	5	"Friend or Boyfriend?"	December 8, 2020
Moriah brings Max to meet the family, while Ethan and Olivia work to mend their relationship issues. Olivia also finds out she will not be able to go on a previously-planned photography mission trip to Africa.
12	6	"A Moment of Doubt"	December 15, 2020
Kim and Barry reflect on their son, Josh, who was killed in a farming accident in 2008, and work to mend their relationship with their adult children. Ethan and Olivia decide to get couples tattoos, while Moriah and Max navigate being just friends.
13	7	"The Open Road"	December 22, 2020
Lydia discusses a crush she has with her mother, Kim, while Ethan and Olivia travel to Los Angeles for a getaway. Moriah throws a girls' night and Lydia attends, encouraged to try on immodest clothing.
14	8	"My Everything"	December 29, 2020
Ethan and Olivia continue their Los Angeles trip by going to couples therapy, which ends up being a tantric workshop. Kim, Barry, Micah, Moriah and the family reunite to celebrate Joshua's memory.
15	9	"I Came to Say Goodbye"	January 5, 2021
Ethan decides to confront his parents about their disagreement, expressing how he feels his boundaries aren't respected. Kim expresses unexpected regret over her parenting to Moriah, who is also beginning a music career. Micah signs his first modeling contract.

=== Season 3 (2021) ===
No. overall	No. in season	Title	Original release date
16	1	"What's up Sugar Bum?"	August 17, 2021
Micah and Lydia help Max with a surprise for Moriah, while Ethan and Olivia experience marital issues. Lydia prays over her family, hoping for reconciliation between Ethan and her parents.
17	2	"A Runaway Freight Train"	August 24, 2021
Lydia and Ethan reunite to spend time together, while Micah brings Helena to meet Ethan and Olivia, sparking questions over the former's relationship status. Max struggles with wanting Ethan and Olivia's approval.
18	3	"Her Little Power Move"	August 31, 2021
Ethan dramatically tells Kim to stay off of his property, while Moriah and Olivia bond over babies and birth control. Kim and Barry surprise Micah for his 20th birthday.
19	4	"I'm Gonna Lose My Mind"	September 7, 2021
Olivia and Ethan take Moriah and Max out for a fun day, but the former two get into an argument. Olivia later helps Micah with a promiscuous photoshoot while Lydia struggles with communicating with her crush.
20	5	"You Were the One That Changed"	September 14, 2021
Lydia accompanies Max to purchase a promise ring for Moriah, while Kim and Ethan's tension make it difficult for him to spend time with his brothers. Olivia and Ethan begin searching for relocation options.
21	6	"Is This a Date?"	September 21, 2021
Olivia goes to therapy, where she confronts the idea of leaving Ethan. Max insults Moriah's revealing outfits, while Barry takes Micah and Isaac out golfing. Micah later goes on an official date with Helena.
22	7	"If You Got It, Flaunt It"	September 28, 2021
Olivia, Moriah and Helena go on a girls trip together, while Micah sparks interest in a new girl he goes on a date with. Ethan struggles with codependency in Olivia's absence.
23	8	"A Tiny Pair of Shorts"	October 5, 2021
Ethan returns from a mysterious road trip, while Moriah goes shopping with Kim to find outfits for her upcoming gig. Micah gets a call from his agent, who tells him he needs to be more professional.
24	9	"This is Your Only First Concert"	October 12, 2021
Ethan and Olivia discuss ways to mend their relationship, while Kim and Barry cope with not being invited to Moriah's upcoming gig in Tallahassee. Ethan gets angry when he finds out his parents snuck into her show.
25	10	"Wanna Get a Room?"	October 19, 2021
Ethan and Micah look for their parents at the concert, demanding that they leave. Max surprises Moriah with the promise ring during a picnic, while Olivia and Ethan come to an agreement on relocating. Barry teaches Isaac how to shave.
26	11	"I Wanna Be a Pirate"	October 26, 2021
Micah and Moriah go camping with Ethan and Olivia, which grows awkward amid the latter two's fighting. Lydia begins texting her new crush frequently, which causes Barry and Kim to have a discussion with her.
27	12	"I Want to Talk to Your Parents"	November 2, 2021
Lydia graduates from high school and is surprised by a visit from her older sister, Hosanna. Micah, Moriah, Ethan and Olivia decide to move out of Georgia.

=== Season 4 (2022) ===
No. overall	No. in season	Title	Original release date
28	1	"The Universe Had Different Plans"	May 17, 2022
Ethan and Olivia have relocated to Tampa, Florida, continuing to mend their relationship, while Micah adapts to life in Los Angeles. Moriah deals with the fallout of her breakup with Max, and Kim surprises the children by telling them she plans to leave her husband, Barry.
29	2	"I Took Things a Little Too Far"	May 24, 2022
Micah meets up with Max to discuss his breakup with Moriah, while Barry and Kim continue to grow apart. The parents talk with Moriah about her relationship with Max.
30	3	"Missed Myself"	May 31, 2022
Moriah visits Micah in Los Angeles, where she confirms Micah's suspicions that Max cheated on her. Ethan confides in Olivia about his secret hobby, repairing cars, while Kim invites a male friend from her gym over for dinner.
31	4	"Double Life"	June 7, 2022
Drama ensues when Ethan gets a girl's number at a bar, while Kim and Barry's marital issues begin to affect the entire family. Moriah meets Nathan and spends time talking to him, while Micah tries Indian food for the first time.
32	5	"I Was Born in the Dining Room"	June 14, 2022
Ethan deals with the fallout of his actions with Olivia, while Micah goes on a double date. Kim discusses her feelings and marriage with her daughters.
33	6	"Dirty Little Sinners"	June 21, 2022
Ethan returns home to Georgia to face Olivia, while Moriah struggles with her ex-boyfriend posting a video about her on social media and visits with her mother.
34	7	"Eyes Down!"	June 28, 2022
Micah goes to a strip club for his 21st birthday with Ethan and Olivia, while Moriah confronts Lydia about her meeting up with Max and Kim moves back home.
35	8	"I Feel Like a Cow"	July 5, 2022
Barry reunites with Ethan after two years to discuss the changes in his marriage, which leaves Kim feeling left out. Moriah and Olivia try out pole dancing.
36	9	"You Have a Lot of Nerve"	July 12, 2022
Kim and Micah share their first cocktail together, while Kim reveals her reasoning behind how she raised her children. Ethan and Barry make up, and the former secretly buys a vintage car.
37	10	"I Wasn't Invited"	July 19, 2022
Micah takes interest in a woman named Anita while bartending an art show, while the entire family reunites with the exception of Kim.
38	11	"I'm Done Choosing"	July 26, 2022
The entire family gathers to honor the life of their deceased brother, Joshua, but tensions arise with Olivia when she finds out Kim is attending.
39	12	"You Know What You Did"	August 1, 2022
Micah goes on a first date with Anita, and tensions brew between Olivia and Moriah. Ethan reaches out to Kim that he wants to talk, shocking her.
40	13	"Everyone's Invited"	August 8, 2022
Olivia, Micah, Moriah and Ethan celebrate the latter's birthday in Jamaica, where Olivia is confronted by Micah and Moriah. Barry plans a river trip, as Olivia makes a decision about her marriage.

=== Season 5 (2023) ===
No. overall	No. in season	Title	Original release date
41	1	"Is This a Dagger Which I See Before Me?"	September 5, 2023
42	2	"No Legacy Is So Rich as Honesty"	September 12, 2023
43	3	"To Thine Own Self Be True"	September 19, 2023
44	4	"Life's But a Walking Shadow..."	September 26, 2023
45	5	"Parting is Such Sweet Sorrow"	October 3, 2023
46	6	"Come What May..."	October 10, 2023
47	7	"Romeo, Romeo!"	October 17, 2023
48	8	"Now Is the Winter of Our Discontent"	October 24, 2023
49	9	"So Foul and Fair a Day I Have Not Seen"	October 31, 2023
50	10	"I Am Not Bound To Please..."	November 7, 2023
51	11	"The Wheel Is Come Full Circle"	November 14, 2023
52	12	"Off With His Head!"	November 21, 2023
53	13	"If I Lose Mine Honor, I Lose Myself"	November 28, 2023
54	14	"To Be or Not To Be..."	December 5, 2023

=== Season 6 (2024) ===
No. overall	No. in season	Title	Original release date
55	1	"You Kept the Plants Alive"	July 16, 2024
56	2	"Never Say Never"	July 23, 2024
57	3	"They're All Freaks Here"	July 30, 2024
58	4	"You're Like a Stranger to Me Now"	August 6, 2024
59	5	"How Do I Get Rizz?"	August 13, 2024
60	6	"Give Me Your Mud"	August 20, 2024
61	7	"I Was Born on Highway 111"	August 27, 2024
62	8	"Wine Helps the Sex Ed Go Down"	September 3, 2024
63	9	"That's What Walls Are For"	September 10, 2024
64	10	"I Love You. I Love You."	September 17, 2024
65	11	"I Grew Up Under a Rock"	September 24, 2024
66	12	"Hold My Earrings"	October 1, 2024

=== Season 7 (2025) ===
No. overall	No. in season	Title	Original release date
67	1	"The Boyfriend"	July 22, 2025
68	2	"The Face-Off"	July 29, 2025
69	3	"The Cabin in the Woods"	August 5, 2025
70	4	"The Proposal"	August 12, 2025
71	5	"The Secret"	August 19, 2025
72	6	"The Birds and the Bees"	August 26, 2025
73	7	"The Houseguests"	September 1, 2025
74	8	"The Day Before I Say "I Do""	September 9, 2025
75	9	"The First Kiss"	September 16, 2025
76	10	"The Incident"	September 23, 2025
77	11	"The Reckoning"	September 30, 2025

=== Season 8 (2026) ===
No. overall	No. in season	Title	Original release date
78	1	"Practice What You Preach"	March 31, 2026
79	2	"You Catch More Flies With Honey..."	April 7, 2026
80	3	"Fish or Cut Bait"	April 14, 2026
81	4	"That Dog Won't Hunt"	April 22, 2026
82	5	"High Hopes"	April 29, 2026
83	6	"Kick Mud, Kiss My Grits"	May 6, 2026
84	7	"A Bone To Pick With You"	May 12, 2026
85	8	"Up Creek Without A Paddle"	May 19, 2026
86	9	"It's All Cattywampus"	May 26, 2026
87	10	"Where The Rubber Meets The Road"	June 3, 2026
88	11	"Stir The Pot"	June 10, 2026
89	12	"From The Horse's Mouth"	June 17, 2026

== Production ==
The Plath family was approached for a television series after a producer saw a music video of their family band. The series was announced in October 2019. It is filmed in Cairo, Georgia.

== Release ==
The series premiered on TLC on November 5, 2019.
