= Floor Is Lava =

2020 reality television show

- Genre: Game show
- Created by: Megan McGrath; Irad Eyal
- Directed by: Brian Smith
- Presented by: Rutledge Wood
- Country of origin: United States
- Original language: English
- No. of seasons: 3
- No. of episodes: 20

Production
- Executive producers: Anthony Carbone; Irad Eyal; Megan McGrath; Arthur Smith (season 3); Brian Smith
- Running time: 25–37 minutes
- Production companies: A. Smith & Co. (season 3); Haymaker Media; Gang of Wolves

Original release
- Network: Netflix
- Release: June 19, 2020 – September 30, 2022

Floor Is Lava is an American television game show created by Megan McGrath and Irad Eyal, hosted by Rutledge Wood. It premiered on Netflix on June 19, 2020.

== Format ==
The show's premise is based on that of the children's game of the same name. Participants navigate an obstacle course in a room filled with 80,000 US gallons (66,614 gallons, 302,833 litres) of slippery, bright red gunge that simulates hot lava. Contestants must clamber on top of and move between objects above the "lava", with the goal of reaching the exit without falling in.

In each episode, three teams of three contestants try to complete the course. The winning team is that with the highest number of surviving members escaping the room or, in the event of a tie, completing the course in the shortest time. In the first season, the lava gradually rises to submerge a step at the foot of the exit that may help participants to escape the room easier, after which the pool of liquid becomes more volatile, making objects above the lava harder to traverse. The second season dropped this aspect, but each contestant now had to collect an "exit pass" before they could escape. In addition, the two most successful teams now competed head-to-head to complete a final course, the Volcano, to determine the winning team. Winners receive US$10,000 and a trophy in the shape of a lava lamp.

== Production ==
The show is shot at a disused IKEA in Burbank, California. Prior to finding the location, multiple Hollywood studios turned down the opportunity to host the show, due to concerns about its messiness. The actual formulation of the lava is a closely guarded secret known to only a few crew members, and co-executive producer Anthony Carbone has cited Panda Express's orange chicken as a close approximation. At one point, a proposal to add chemicals to make the lava glow in the dark was scrapped after the crew discovered that the formulation would render the lava toxic. In order not to break immersion, individual players do not use safety equipment. Instead, according to co-executive producer Irad Eyal, "every single object in the game is built and designed from scratch to be able to not only hold up to punishment but protect the contestants." According to Carbone, the show purchased and repurposed the volcano used by Kanye West during the Yeezus tour.

Inspiration for the show includes the Indiana Jones and Night at the Museum film series. To the latter point, the setting was initially going to be a natural history museum before being changed to a mansion. Video games were also an influence in designing the levels, with the crew specifically citing Uncharted (2007) as an example. As such, the courses are designed in a non-linear fashion, with the second half of the first season acting as a "level two" and upping the challenge of the first half.

== Release ==
Floor Is Lava was released on June 19, 2020, via Netflix. The show's release coincided with several similar shows, such as ABC's Don't and Fox's Ultimate Tag, in what USA Today dubbed the "summer of silliness", while British GQ compared its "silly sets and close awkwardness" to "the belly-laugh slapstick of Japanese game shows" such as Takeshi's Castle. The series received renewed focus in December 2020 after being mentioned in the Netflix mockumentary film Death to 2020. A Hindi dub of the show was released in 2021, and is presented by Jaaved Jaaferi.

In April 2021, the series was renewed for a second season, which debuted on June 3, 2022. On September 16, 2022, a third and final season of the show was announced, debuting on September 30.

== Episodes ==
=== Series overview ===
Season	Episodes	Originally released
1	10	June 19, 2020
2	5	June 3, 2022
3	5	September 30, 2022

=== Season 1 (2020) ===
No. overall	No. in season	Title	Directed by	Original release date
1	1	"The Basement: Level 1"	Brian Smith	June 19, 2020
2	2	"The Bedroom: Level 1"	Brian Smith	June 19, 2020
3	3	"The Planetarium: Level 1"	Brian Smith	June 19, 2020
4	4	"The Kitchen: Level 1"	Brian Smith	June 19, 2020
5	5	"The Study: Level 1"	Brian Smith	June 19, 2020
6	6	"The Kitchen: Level 2"	Brian Smith	June 19, 2020
7	7	"The Planetarium: Level 2"	Brian Smith	June 19, 2020
8	8	"The Basement: Level 2"	Brian Smith	June 19, 2020
9	9	"The Bedroom: Level 2"	Brian Smith	June 19, 2020
10	10	"The Study: Level 2"	Brian Smith	June 19, 2020

=== Season 2 (2022) ===
No. overall	No. in season	Title	Directed by	Original release date
11	1	"Return of the Virzi Triplets"	Brian Smith	June 3, 2022
12	2	"Ballers, Ballerinas, and Black Belts"	Brian Smith	June 3, 2022
13	3	"Moms vs Dads"	Brian Smith	June 3, 2022
14	4	"Once Upon a Volcano"	Brian Smith	June 3, 2022
15	5	"Hotter than Lava"	Brian Smith	June 3, 2022

=== Season 3 (2022) ===
No. overall	No. in season	Title	Directed by	Original release date
16	1	"All Fun and Games"	Brian Smith	September 30, 2022
17	2	"Best Frenemies"	Brian Smith	September 30, 2022
18	3	"Putting the Lava in Check"	Brian Smith	September 30, 2022
19	4	"Cruisers, Bakers and Bubble Makers"	Brian Smith	September 30, 2022
20	5	"Child's Play"	Brian Smith	September 30, 2022
