= Tinopolis =

Welsh TV company

The Tinopolis Group
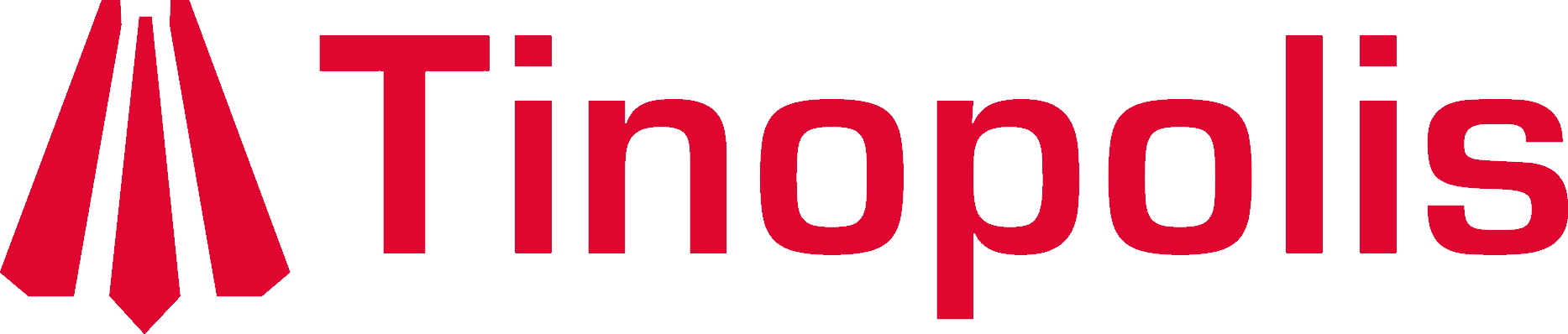
- Type: Private
- Industry: Television
- Founded: 1990 by Ron Jones
- Headquarters: Llanelli, Wales
- Number of locations: 5 (2018)
- Key people: Ron Jones (executive chairman); Arwel Rees (CEO); Angharad Mair (chairman, Wales); Jeff Foulser (chairman, Sunset + Vine); John Willis (CEO, Mentorn)
- Revenue: £236 million (2022)
- Operating income: £16.23 million (2022)
- Net income: £3.46 million (2022)
- Number of employees: 529 (2022)
- Website: www.tinopolis.com

The Tinopolis Group is an international TV production and distribution group with businesses based in the UK and US. It produces over 4,500 hours of television annually for more than 200 UK and foreign broadcasters. It owns 13 content production companies in various genres, and distributor Passion Distribution.

== History ==
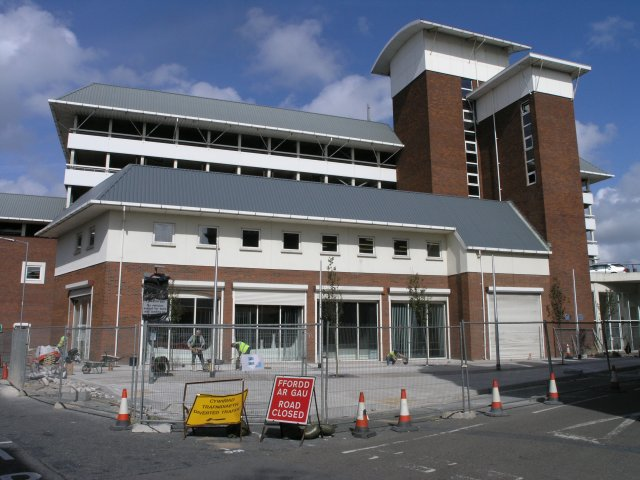
Tinopolis Centre at Park Street, Llanelli

It was founded in 1990 by Ron Jones in Wales.

In October 2005, Tinopolis announced its potential takeover approach to acquire London-based television production company Mentorn Media including its Scottish production office Mentorn Scotland and its international distribution arm Mentorn International alongside its parent production group Television Corporation (including its production offices in both Oxford and Glasgow) and its fellow production subsidiaries Folio Productions, Sunset+Vine and Redback Films in a deal that would expand Tinopolis' sports production activities and boost its operations into London.

In June 2011, Tinopolis announced it had entered the American production market by acquiring Los Angeles-based American unscripted reality production company A. Smith & Co. Productions, the acquisition of American unscripted production outfit A. Smith & Co. Productions had gained Tinopolis its own American production subsidiary with Tinopolis merging its American production operations into the acquired American studio as A. Smith & Co. Productions would collaborate with Tinopolis' fellow subsidiaries such as Sunset+Vine to co-produce content and adapt Tinopolis' formats into America as A. Smith & Co.'s co-founders Arthur Smith and Kent Weed had continued to lead the acquired Los Angeles-based American unscripted production company under Tinopolis with its founders had joined Tinopolis' board of directors

In August 2011 following Tinopolis' entry into the United States and the acquisition of A. Smith & Co Productions, Tinopolis announced it had brought Los-Angeles-based American unscripted production company BASE Productions with its production offices based in both Burbank and Washington. The acquisition of Los Angeles-based American production company BASE Productions marked Tinopolis' second American production studio acquisition and it boosted its American operations in that country whilst BASE Productions' founders John Brenkus and Mickey Stern continued operating the production studio within Tinopolis as the former joined Tinopolis' board.

In December 2012, Tinopolis had expanded its distribution activities and its international production operations with the acquisition of London-based British global media international distribution company that distributes content from Passion Distribution, giving Tinopolis its own international distribution division as Passion Distribution's founder Sally Miles had continued leading Tinopolis' newly acquired international distribution arm Passion Distribution with Tinopolis had merged its fellow international distribution subsidiary and former distribution division of Tinopolis' subsidiary Mentorn Media, Mentorn International (MINT) and its programming catalogue into the acquired London-based distribution unit Passion Distribution with Passion started distributing future programmes from Tinopolis' unit Mentorn and the former's own production units worldwide. Three days later in that same month, Tinopolis had acquired Firecracker Films.

== Operations ==
Company	Founded	Acquired	Ref.
A. Smith & Co.	2000	2011	
Daybreak Pictures	2006	—	
fFatti fFilms	2013	—	
Fiction Factory	2001	—	
Firecracker Films	2002	2012	
Magical Elves	2001	2014	
Mentorn	1985	2006	
MSV Post	—	—	
Passion Distribution	2008	2012	
Pioneer Productions	1988	2009	
Sunset+Vine	1976	2006	
Thunderclap Media	2017	—	
Tinint	1999	—	
Tinopolis Cymru	—	—	
Tinopolis Factual Group Scotland	2002	—	
Video Arts	1972	2007	

== See also ==
- Media in Wales
