= Voices of Fire (TV series) =

- Promotional poster
- Genre: Gospel, Docuseries
- Country of origin: United States
- No. of seasons: 1
- No. of episodes: 6

Production
- Production companies: A. Smith & Co.; I Am Other

Original release
- Release: November 20, 2020

Voices of Fire is a 2020 gospel musical documentary television series that follows Pharrell Williams, his uncle Bishop Ezekiel Williams, and their team of gospel leaders as they travel to Pharrell's hometown of Hampton Roads, Virginia, in search of talented singers to build a world class gospel choir.

The 6-episode series produced by A. Smith & Co. and I Am Other and was released on Netflix on November 20, 2020.

== Episodes ==
No.	Title	Original release date
1	"A Gospel Project"	November 20, 2020
2	"Searching for Unicorns"	November 20, 2020
3	"Decision Day"	November 20, 2020
4	"Shaking the Tree"	November 20, 2020
5	"Solos"	November 20, 2020
6	"The Debut Concert"	November 20, 2020
