= In View (TV program) =

- Genre: Current affairs/Culture
- Presented by: Nathan Cohen
- Country of origin: Canada
- Original language: English
- No. of seasons: 1

Production
- Producer: Don MacPherson
- Running time: 30 minutes

Original release
- Network: CBC Television
- Release: 15 October 1962 – 6 May 1963

In View is a Canadian cultural current affairs television program that aired on CBC Television from 1962 to 1963.

== Premise ==
Nathan Cohen hosted this program on culture, especially in media. The debut episode concerned television and particularly Sir Harry Pilkington's report on broadcasting in the United Kingdom. Publishing industry topics were also covered, such as a strike at The New York Times and a feature on paperback publishing with Fred Kerner of book publisher Fawcett.

== Scheduling ==
This half-hour program was broadcast on Mondays at 10:30 p.m. (Eastern) from 15 October 1962 to 6 May 1963, on weeks when Festival ran 60 instead of 90 minutes.
