= The Swan (TV series) =

American reality television series

- Genre: Reality television
- Presented by: Amanda Byram
- Country of origin: United States
- Original language: English
- No. of seasons: 2
- No. of episodes: 18

Production
- Executive producers: Arthur Smith; Nely Galán
- Running time: 45–50 minutes
- Production company: FremantleMedia North America

Original release
- Network: Fox
- Release: April 7 – December 20, 2004

The Swan is an American reality television series broadcast by the Fox Broadcasting Company (Fox). It premiered on April 7, 2004, while its eighteenth and final episode aired on December 20, 2004. The series was hosted by Irish television presenter Amanda Byram.

The Swan has garnered negative reception from critics and audiences. Criticism of the series often focused on the promotion of a negative body image for women. Despite the negative reception, The Swan premiered to high ratings and averaged around 9 million viewers over the course of its first season. Since its conclusion, most contestants have voiced satisfaction with their participation in the series. According to producers, the show's purpose was to increase the self-esteem of its contestants. In 2013, Fox announced plans to revive the series as a two-hour television special titled Celebrity Swan, but as of 2018 it was no longer in development.

Its title refers to the classic Danish fairy tale from 1843 called The Ugly Duckling where a homely bird matures into a swan (or in this case, a cygnet).

== Premise ==
Each episode of the series followed two self-proclaimed "ugly ducklings" who, over the course of a three-month period, experienced an extreme makeover from a team that included a personal trainer, therapist, dentist, and cosmetic surgeons. Whichever woman was deemed more attractive at the end of the three months would move forward to compete in a beauty pageant held at the end of the season. Following the pageant, whichever contestant received the most votes for the greatest transformation would be given the title "The Swan".

== Production ==
In 2005, Rebecca Hertz, a writer of the series, admitted that the series' staff manufactured dialogue and situations throughout the editing process. Hertz claimed that she falsely made it appear as though contestant Rachel Love-Fraser's husband was unhappily married to her, stating, "In a pre-interview, I led her husband to say Rachel looks average, but he thought she looked beautiful. I cut it down to him saying she looks average, so he sounded like a mean, horrible a–hole. He was furious when he saw the show".

== Series overview ==
=== Season 1 (2004) ===
The Swan debuted on April 7, 2004.

EP	Contestant #1	Contestant #2
1	Kelly Alemi	Rachel Love-Fraser
2	Kristy Garza	Cristina Tyree
3	Cindy Ingle	Tawnya Cooke
4	Beth Lay	Kathy Rickers
5	Andrea Morris	Belinda Bessant
6	Sarina Voight	Kelly Becker
7	Marnie Rygiewicz	Dawn Goad
8	Tanya Slovich	Merline Norman

Through to the pageant
Wildcard
Contestant Tanya dropped out of the show (on her own accord) after being caught with a mirror (which is against the rules of appearing on the series), so Merline was automatically in the swan pageant. Though other contestants claim the real reason for her "dismissal" was due to Slovich requiring hospitalization.

==== Swan pageant ====
At the show the judges would score in every category with the swan contestants competing, eventually being whittled down to three finalists. The judges at the show were:

- Susie Castillo – Miss USA 2003
- Valerie Trott – model management executive
- Judith Regan – publisher of several self-help books
- Tara Kraft – beauty director of Star magazine
- Mike Ruiz – fashion photographer

The winner received a modeling contract, and various premiums by corporate sponsors.

==== Final competition scores ====
Swan Finalist	Evening Gown	Swimsuit	Q&A	Lingerie
Rachel	9.8 (1)	9.8 (1)	9.6 (1)	9.7 (1)
Beth	9.6 (2)	9.6 (2)	9.2 (2)	9.1 (3)
Cindy	9.4 (3)	9.4 (3)	8.9 (5)	9.3 (2)
Kelly	8.5 (6)	8.5 (6)	9.0 (3)	8.9 (4)
Marnie	8.8 (4)	9.0 (4)	8.4 (6)	8.6 (5)
Sarina	8.7 (5)	8.7 (5)	9.0 (3)	8.4 (6)
Merline	7.9 (7)	7.9 (7)		
Christina	7.8 (8)	7.9 (7)		
Belinda	7.7 (9)	7.7 (9)		

Winner
First runner-up
Second runner-up
Top 6
Top 9
(#) Rank in each round of competition

After 9 episodes and 16 makeovers it was announced that Rachel Love-Fraser had won the swan pageant. Beth placed runner-up, with Cindy second runner-up.

=== Season 2 (2004) ===
Season 2 debuted on October 27, 2004. Kari and Gina Bravata from episode 4 are sisters.

EP	Contestant #1	Contestant #2
1	Jennifer Patten	Kim Wilburn
2	Gina Davis	Lorrie Arias
3	Christina Ozuna	Erica Moore
4	Gina Bravata	Kari Bravata
5	Cinnamon Smith	Patti Chedohan
6	DeLisa Styles	Lorraine Norris
7	Marsha Meddleburg	Sylvia Cruz
8	Amy Williams	Dore Weber

Through to the pageant
Wildcard

==== Swan pageant ====
At the show the judges scored the swan contestants in several categories, whittling them down to three finalists. The judges at the show were:

- Ken Baker – West Coast Executive Editor of US Weekly magazine
- Crista Sides-Klayman – LA Models Management
- Carnie Wilson – Wilson Phillips singer, actor, author
- Larry A. Thompson – producer, author
- Dayanara Torres – Miss Universe 1993

The winner was awarded a contract as a spokesperson and various premiums by corporate sponsors.

==== Final competition scores ====
Swan Finalist	Evening Gown	Swimsuit	Q&A	Lingerie
DeLisa	9.9 (1)	9.9 (1)	9.5 (1)	9.9 (1)
Gina B	9.5 (2)	9.5 (2)	9.3 (2)	9.3 (2)
Erica	9.3 (3)	9.3 (3)	9.1 (4)	9.1 (3)
Kari	9.2 (4)	9.3 (3)	9.1 (4)	9.1 (3)
Gina D	8.9 (5)	8.8 (5)	9.3 (2)	9.1 (3)
Jennifer	8.3 (6)	8.3 (6)		
Amy	8.2 (7)	8.2 (7)		
Marsha	8.2 (7)	8.2 (7)		
Cinnamon	8.1 (9)	8.1 (9)		

Winner
First runner-up
Second runner-up
Top 5
Top 9
(#) Rank in each round of competition

After 9 episodes and 16 makeovers it was announced that DeLisa Styles had won the swan pageant. Gina Bravata placed runner-up, with Erica second runner-up.

== Reception ==
=== Television viewership and ratings ===
The series premiered to 15 million viewers.

=== Critical response ===
The series received a negative reception from television critics. Gillian Flynn of Entertainment Weekly claimed the series was "a misogynistic mix of TV's twin vices: commercialism and conformity." USA Today's Robert Bianco believed the series to be "[h]urtful and repellent even by reality's constantly plummeting standards," further describing it as an advertisement for plastic surgery. Variety's Brian Lowry similarly claimed that the series glorified plastic surgery; however, he praised its graphics and music. Gaby Wood of The Guardian criticized the series' premise, stating, "the winner on The Swan is the woman who is thought to have undergone the greatest 'overall transformation' — in other words, the one who appears least like her former self."

Journalist Jennifer Pozner, in her book Reality Bites Back, calls The Swan "the most sadistic reality series of the decade". Journalist Chris Hedges also criticized the show in his 2009 book Empire of Illusion, writing "The Swan's transparent message is that once these women have been surgically 'corrected' to resemble mainstream celebrity beauty as closely as possible, their problems will be solved". Feminist scholar Susan J. Douglas criticized the show in her book The Rise of Enlightened Sexism for its continuation of a negative female body image, claiming that the series showed "the narrow physical standards to which women are expected to conform, the sad degree to which women internalize these standards, the lengths needed to get there, and the impossibility for most of us to meet the bar without, well, taking a box cutter to our faces and bodies". Author Alice Marwick described the show as "body culture media", in which plastic surgery is framed as "a morally correct solution to personal problems".

=== Cultural impact ===
In 2013, second-season contestant Lorrie Arias spoke publicly about problems she attributed to her participation in The Swan, including unresolved surgery complications and mental health problems she says were exacerbated by her appearance on the program.

In 2010, Entertainment Weekly ranked the program the worst reality television show ever produced.

It was also the subject of the first episode of the 2024 VICE docuseries Dark Side of Reality TV.

In March 2025, it was announced Hulu was in production on a documentary revolving around the series directed by Erin Lee Carr. On September 24, 2026, it has been announced that The Swan: Behind the Mirror would be released for Huluand Disney+on September 29, 2026.

== Episode status ==
The series briefly ran on the now-defunct Fox Reality Channel.

Both seasons 1 and 2 episodes can be viewed on the Internet Archive.

== See also ==
- List of television shows notable for negative reception
- Social effects of television
