= Pros vs. Joes =

- Logo from the first two seasons
- Created by: Confidential
- Starring: Petros Papadakis (Seasons 1–3); Michael Strahan and Jay Glazer (Season 4–5)
- Country of origin: United States
- No. of seasons: 5
- No. of episodes: 46

Production
- Running time: 60 minutes

Original release
- Network: Spike
- Release: March 6, 2006 – September 8, 2010

Pros vs. Joes is an American physical reality game show that aired on Spike from 2006 to 2010. The show featured male amateur contestants (the "Joes") matching themselves against professional athletes (the "Pros"; mostly of retired male and female professional athletes) in a series of athletic feats related to the expertise sport of the Pro they are facing. For its first three seasons, the show was hosted by Petros Papadakis. In the last two seasons, it was co-hosted by Michael Strahan and Jay Glazer. The first two seasons were filmed at Carson, California's Home Depot Center, which was referenced in aerial shots. Repeats can currently be seen on the El Rey Network.

== Professional participants ==
=== Season One ===
Each of the first nine episodes of Pros vs. Joes consisted of a team of five professional athletes, distinguished by their uniform color on the show. Each team, other than the Red Team, appeared in two episodes. A special, "all-star", six-member Orange Team was put together for the season finale.

==== Red Team ====
- Bill Goldberg, NFL / WCW / WWE
- Matt Williams, MLB
- Dennis Rodman, NBA
- Jim McMahon, NFL
- Jerry Rice, NFL

==== Blue Team ====
- Muggsy Bogues, NBA
- Jennie Finch, Softball
- Bo Jackson, NFL / MLB
- Dan O'Brien, Olympic Decathlon
- Bill Romanowski, NFL

==== Yellow Team ====
- Kevin Greene, NFL
- Alexi Lalas, MLS
- Misty May, Volleyball
- Xavier McDaniel, NBA
- Dave Stewart, MLB

==== Green Team ====
- Morten Andersen, NFL
- Clyde Drexler, NBA
- Gary Hall Jr., Olympic Swimming
- Rebecca Lobo, WNBA
- John Rocker, MLB

==== Purple Team ====
- Brandi Chastain, Soccer / WUSA / WPS
- Darren Daulton, MLB
- Justin Gatlin, Track
- Herschel Walker, NFL / USFL
- Dominique Wilkins, NBA

==== Orange "All-Star" Team ====
Winner: Charlie Brenneman

- Xavier McDaniel & Clyde Drexler, Basketball
- John Rocker & Darren Daulton, Baseball
- Bill Goldberg & Kevin Greene, Football

=== Season Two ===
Each of the second-season episodes of Pros vs. Joes consisted of a team of four professional athletes, distinguished by their uniform color on the show. Unlike the first season, returning teams wore different colored uniforms upon their return. Like the previous season, the teams on the season opener and finale wore red and orange uniforms respectively. The Season Two winner was US Army Veteran SGT Jay McKeown.

==== Red Team ====
- Jose Canseco, MLB
- Randy Couture, Mixed martial arts
- Michael Irvin, NFL
- Kevin Willis, NBA

==== Purple Team ====
- Will Clark, MLB
- Tim Hardaway, NBA
- Claude Lemieux, NHL
- Kordell Stewart, NFL

==== Green Team - Winner - Rodeny Williams ====
- Vince Coleman, MLB
- Eric Dickerson, NFL
- Roy Jones Jr., Boxing
- Kevin Willis, NBA

==== Teal/Gold Team ====
- Cobi Jones, MLS
- Andre Reed, NFL
- Darryl Strawberry, MLB
- Spud Webb, NBA

==== Blue Team / Burgundy Team - Winner - Jackson Wright ====
- Rob Dibble, MLB
- Andre Rison, NFL
- Robby Ginepri, pro tennis ATP
- Rik Smits, NBA

==== Yellow Team ====
- Kordell Stewart, NFL
- Will Clark, MLB
- Grant Fuhr, NHL
- Tom Chambers, NBA

==== Light Blue Team (The New Yorkers) ====
- Wade Boggs, MLB
- Mark Jackson, NBA
- John Starks, NBA
- Dave Winfield, MLB

==== Orange "Allstar" Team (Finale) ====
Winner - Jay McKeown

- Randall Cunningham, NFL
- Tim Hardaway, NBA
- Kevin Willis, NBA
- Bruce Smith, NFL
- Roy Jones Jr., pro Boxing
- Randy Couture, Mixed martial arts

=== Season Three ===
For Season Three, the format was changed to a "Last Man Standing" format, akin to the NCAA Division I men's basketball tournament with regionals held at the now demolished Miami Orange Bowl, Robert F. Kennedy Memorial Stadium in Washington, D.C., the Louisiana Superdome in New Orleans and the Rose Bowl in Pasadena, California, where the finals were also held. The format now featured eight "Joes" in the opening round that tests them in a contest that will eliminate two of the Joes from contest. Those six remaining Joes were then ranked from one through six with the top seed taking on number six, number two against number five and number three against number four in a home sport of one of the pros, with the top two seeds choosing from the three pros. The winners advance to overtime, but now includes a bench where the Joes change from one uniform into another. Again the fastest among the three advanced to the finals. Gabriel Canape, a wireless rep from Lebanon, Missouri, was the winner.

As in past seasons, the pros are designated by the color of their uniforms.

==== Green Team (South Regional I) ====
- Jimmy Smith, football
- Kurt Angle, Olympic and Pro Wrestling (TNA)
- Kendall Gill, basketball

Sudden death: Wrestling battle royal

Joes: Eddie Dubose, Brent Allen, Jason Vogel, Matt Hill, Dallas Robinson, Steve Ruff

Winner: Jason Vogel

==== Purple Team (Northeast Regional I) ====
- Ricky Williams, football
- Arturo Gatti, boxing
- Charles Oakley, basketball

sudden death: Punt Return for TD

Joe: "Iron" Mike Hall, Robert Foster, Mark Rohling, Donnie Frazier, Faheem Hammett, and Kevin Witt

Winner: Donnie Frazier (Hall gave it to him)

==== Light Blue Team (Central Regional I) ====
- Kenny Anderson, basketball
- Joe Carter, baseball
- Raghib Ismail, football

Sudden Death: rebounding

Joes: Jay Williams, Micheal Martin, Chris Rich, Tony Railing, Derek Schaefer, Will Hunter

Winner: Derek Schaefer

==== Red Team (Northeast Regional II) ====
- Jessie Armstead, football
- Derrick Coleman, basketball
- Marty McSorley, ice hockey

Sudden Death: onside kicks

Joes: Mike Kotsch, Pablo Healing, Rahul Soni, Jermaine Reid, Joe Goodwin, John Grkovic

Winner: Joe Goodwin

==== Dark Green Team (West Regional I) ====
- Warren Moon, football
- Nick Van Exel, basketball
- Al Leiter, baseball

Sudden Death: TD Returns

Joes: Terrius Moseby, Dave Hubert, Dan Falkner, Jerry Lehman, Carvel Gardner, David Ortiz Jr

Winner: David Ortiz Jr

==== Royal Blue Team (South Regional II) ====
- Christian Okoye, football
- Paul Coffey, ice hockey
- Dan Majerle, basketball

Sudden Death: scoop and score

Joes: Clayton Monte, Greg Macaluso, Brian Peters, Mark Kilibarda, Art Miller, Devon Tilly

Winner: Clayton Monte

==== Yellow Team (West Regional II) ====
- John Randle, football
- John Franco, baseball
- Mitch Richmond, basketball

Sudden Death: intercept the ball

Joes: Dion Santo, Clarence Chaney, Adam Wasserman, Justin Simonsen, Micheal Stange, Trent Madsen

Winner: Trent Madsen

==== Gold Team (Central Regional II) ====
- Brady Anderson, baseball
- Sean Elliott, basketball
- Jeff George, football

Sudden Death: strip the dummy

Joes: Red Simmons, Gabriel Canape, Cory Driggs, Cakvin Lafiton, Tim Fritz, Kirby Sykes

Winner: Gabriel Canape

==== Purple Team (Semi-Final) ====
- Rod Woodson, football
- Antonio Davis, basketball
- Pernell Whitaker, boxing

Winner Gabe canape

==== Maroon Team (Finals) ====
- Jamal Anderson, football
- Allan Houston, basketball
- Bob Sapp, MMA/ football

Winner Gabe Canape.

=== Season Four: Pros vs. Joes: All Stars ===
For the fourth season, which premiered April 27, 2009 at 11 pm ET/PT, the new hosts are FOX Sports NFL Sunday regulars Michael Strahan and Jay Glazer, and is titled "Pros vs. Joes All Stars". In addition, the format changed to a 3-on-3 competition between teams made up of three pros and three joes in three separate skill events and an end game between the teams. If the Joes beat the Pros, they get $10,000.

==== Basketball I ====
- Shawn Kemp
- Eddie Jones
- Ron Harper

==== Football I ====
- Steve McNair
- Tim Brown
- Simeon Rice

==== Basketball II ====
- Antoine Walker
- Alonzo Mourning
- Robert Horry

==== Football II ====
- Steve McNair
- Adam "Pacman" Jones
- Priest Holmes
