= 1998–99 United States network television schedule =

Television schedule for the fall of 1998

The following is the 1998–99 network television schedule for the six major English language commercial broadcast networks in the United States. The schedule covers primetime hours from September 1998 through August 1999. The schedule is followed by a list per network of returning series, new series, and series cancelled after the 1997–98 season. All times are Eastern and Pacific, with certain exceptions, such as Monday Night Football.

New series highlighted in bold.

Each of the 30 highest-rated shows is listed with its rank and rating as determined by Nielsen Media Research.

Yellow indicates the programs in the top 10 for the season.
Cyan indicates the programs in the top 20 for the season.
Magenta indicates the programs in the top 30 for the season.

Other Legend

- Light blue indicates local programming.
- Gray indicates encore programming.
- Blue-gray indicates news programming.
- Light green indicates sporting events.
- Red indicates series being burned off and other irregularly scheduled programs, including movies and specials.
- Light gold indicates programming produced outside of the United States.

PBS, the Public Broadcasting Service, is not included; member stations have local flexibility over most of their schedules and broadcast times for network shows may vary. Also not included is Pax TV (now Ion), a venture of Paxson Communications (now Ion Media) that debuted on August 31, 1998; although Pax carried a limited schedule of first-run programs in its early years, its schedule otherwise was composed mainly of syndicated reruns.

This is the UPN fall season expanding five nights a week for the first time ever from September 1998 and The WB expanding five nights a week with the new Thursday night lineup from the fall season.

== Sunday ==
Network		7:00 PM	7:30 PM	8:00 PM	8:30 PM	9:00 PM	9:30 PM	10:00 PM	10:30 PM
ABC	Fall	The Wonderful World of Disney				20/20		The Practice	
ABC	Winter	The Wonderful World of Disney				20/20		The Practice	
ABC	Spring	The Wonderful World of Disney				20/20		The Practice	
ABC	Summer	The Wonderful World of Disney				20/20		The Practice	
ABC	Late summer	The Wonderful World of Disney				**Who Wants to Be a Millionaire**		The Practice	
CBS		60 Minutes (7/13.2)		Touched by an Angel (8/13.1)		CBS Sunday Movie (9/12.0)			
Fox	Fall	The World's Funniest!	**Holding the Baby**	The Simpsons	**That '70s Show**	The X-Files (28/9.1) (Tied with the NBC Sunday Night Movie)		Local programming	
Fox	Mid-fall	The World's Funniest!		The Simpsons	**That '70s Show**	The X-Files (28/9.1) (Tied with the NBC Sunday Night Movie)		Local programming	
Fox	Winter	The World's Funniest!		The Simpsons	**That '70s Show**	The X-Files (28/9.1) (Tied with the NBC Sunday Night Movie)		Local programming	
Fox	Spring	The World's Funniest!		The Simpsons	**Futurama**	The X-Files (28/9.1) (Tied with the NBC Sunday Night Movie)		Local programming	
Fox	Mid-spring	The World's Funniest!		The Simpsons	**Family Guy**	The X-Files (28/9.1) (Tied with the NBC Sunday Night Movie)		Local programming	
Fox	Summer	The World's Funniest!	King of the Hill (R)	The Simpsons	**Futurama**	The X-Files (28/9.1) (Tied with the NBC Sunday Night Movie)		Local programming	
NBC	Fall	Dateline NBC		Dateline NBC		NBC Sunday Night Movie (28/9.1) (Tied with The X-Files)			
NBC	Winter	Dateline NBC		Dateline NBC		NBC Sunday Night Movie (28/9.1) (Tied with The X-Files)			
NBC	Spring	NBA on NBC		Dateline NBC		NBC Sunday Night Movie (28/9.1) (Tied with The X-Files)			
NBC	Summer	**World's Most Amazing Videos**		Dateline NBC		NBC Sunday Night Movie (28/9.1) (Tied with The X-Files)			
NBC	Late summer	Dateline NBC		**You Asked For It**		NBC Sunday Night Movie (28/9.1) (Tied with The X-Files)			
The WB	Fall	7th Heaven Beginnings (R)		Sister, Sister	Smart Guy	Unhappily Ever After	**The Army Show**	Local programming	
The WB	Winter	7th Heaven Beginnings (R)		Sister, Sister	Smart Guy	**Zoe, Duncan, Jack and Jane**	Unhappily Ever After	Local programming	
The WB	Spring	7th Heaven Beginnings (R)		Sister, Sister	Smart Guy	**Zoe, Duncan, Jack and Jane**	Unhappily Ever After	Local programming	
The WB	Summer	The Parent 'Hood (R)	The Parent 'Hood	Sister, Sister	Smart Guy	**Zoe, Duncan, Jack and Jane**	Unhappily Ever After	Local programming	
The WB	Mid-summer	The Parent 'Hood	Smart Guy	Sister, Sister	**Zoe, Duncan, Jack and Jane**	**Movie Stars**	Unhappily Ever After	Local programming	
The WB	Late summer	**Rescue 77** (R)		Sister, Sister	Smart Guy	The Steve Harvey Show (R)	Unhappily Ever After	Local programming	

== Monday ==
Network		8:00 PM	8:30 PM	9:00 PM	9:30 PM	10:00 PM	10:30 PM
ABC	Fall	Monday Night Blast		Monday Night Football (4/14.9)			
ABC	Winter	20/20		**ABC Big Picture Show**			
ABC	Spring	20/20		**ABC Big Picture Show**			
ABC	Summer	20/20		**ABC Big Picture Show**			
CBS	Fall	Cosby	**The King of Queens**	Everybody Loves Raymond (11/10.6)	**The Brian Benben Show**	**L.A. Doctors**	
CBS	Mid-fall	Cosby	**The King of Queens**	Everybody Loves Raymond (11/10.6)	**Becker** (19/9.7) (Tied with Dateline Monday, Dateline Tuesday and the CBS Tuesday Movie)	**L.A. Doctors**	
CBS	Winter	Cosby	**The King of Queens**	Everybody Loves Raymond (11/10.6)	**Becker** (19/9.7) (Tied with Dateline Monday, Dateline Tuesday and the CBS Tuesday Movie)	**L.A. Doctors**	
CBS	Spring	Cosby	**The King of Queens**	Everybody Loves Raymond (11/10.6)	**Becker** (19/9.7) (Tied with Dateline Monday, Dateline Tuesday and the CBS Tuesday Movie)	**L.A. Doctors**	
CBS	Summer	Cosby	**The King of Queens**	Everybody Loves Raymond (11/10.6)	**Becker** (19/9.7) (Tied with Dateline Monday, Dateline Tuesday and the CBS Tuesday Movie)	48 Hours	
CBS	Late summer	**The King of Queens**	**Thanks**	Everybody Loves Raymond (11/10.6)	**Becker** (19/9.7) (Tied with Dateline Monday, Dateline Tuesday and the CBS Tuesday Movie)	48 Hours	
Fox	Fall	Melrose Place		Ally McBeal (23/9.6)		Local programming	
Fox	Winter	Melrose Place		Ally McBeal (23/9.6)		Local programming	
Fox	Spring	Melrose Place		Ally McBeal (23/9.6)		Local programming	
Fox	Summer	**That '70s Show**	**That '70s Show** (R)	Ally McBeal (23/9.6)		Local programming	
NBC	Fall	Suddenly Susan	**Conrad Bloom**	Caroline in the City	**Will & Grace**	Dateline Monday (19/9.7) (Tied with Becker, Dateline Tuesday and the CBS Tuesday Movie)	
NBC	Mid-fall	Suddenly Susan	Caroline in the City	Mad About You	**Conrad Bloom**	Dateline Monday (19/9.7) (Tied with Becker, Dateline Tuesday and the CBS Tuesday Movie)	
NBC	Winter	Suddenly Susan	Caroline in the City	Mad About You	Working	Dateline Monday (19/9.7) (Tied with Becker, Dateline Tuesday and the CBS Tuesday Movie)	
NBC	Spring	Suddenly Susan	Caroline in the City	Law & Order (R)		Dateline Monday (19/9.7) (Tied with Becker, Dateline Tuesday and the CBS Tuesday Movie)	
NBC	Mid-spring	Suddenly Susan	Mad About You	The NBC Monday Movie			
NBC	Summer	Suddenly Susan	Suddenly Susan (R)	Mad About You	Mad About You (R)	Dateline Monday (19/9.7) (Tied with Becker, Dateline Tuesday and the CBS Tuesday Movie)	
NBC	Mid-summer	Suddenly Susan	Veronica's Closet (R)	Law & Order (R)		Dateline Monday (19/9.7) (Tied with Becker, Dateline Tuesday and the CBS Tuesday Movie)	
UPN	Fall	**Guys Like Us**	**DiResta**	**The Secret Diary of Desmond Pfeiffer**	Malcolm & Eddie	Local programming	
UPN	Mid-fall	Malcolm & Eddie	**Guys Like Us**	Malcolm & Eddie	**DiResta**	Local programming	
UPN	Winter	**Dilbert**	**DiResta**	The Sentinel		Local programming	
UPN	Spring	**Dilbert**	**Redhanded**	The Sentinel		Local programming	
UPN	Mid-spring	**Dilbert**	**Home Movies**	The Sentinel		Local programming	
UPN	Early summer	**Dilbert**	**Home Movies**	**Power Play**		Local programming	
UPN	Summer	**Dilbert**	**Dilbert** (R)	**Redhanded**	**Redhanded** (R)	Local programming	
UPN	Mid-summer	The Sentinel		**Seven Days** (R)		Local programming	
UPN	Late summer	Moesha (R)	Moesha (R)	Between Brothers	Malcolm & Eddie	Local programming	
The WB	Fall	7th Heaven		**Hyperion Bay**		Local programming	
The WB	Mid-fall	7th Heaven		Various programming		Local programming	
The WB	Winter	7th Heaven		**Hyperion Bay**		Local programming	
The WB	Spring	7th Heaven		**Rescue 77**		Local programming	
The WB	Mid-spring	7th Heaven		Buffy the Vampire Slayer		Local programming	
The WB	Summer	7th Heaven		**Rescue 77**		Local programming	
The WB	Mid-summer	7th Heaven		**Movie Stars**	For Your Love (R)	Local programming	
The WB	Late summer	7th Heaven		**Movie Stars**	**Katie Joplin**	Local programming	

Note: UPN only broadcast the first two episodes of Power Play. On August 16, 1999, ABC aired the series premiere of Who Wants to Be a Millionaire at 8:30pm EDT. It was the only 30 minute episode to air on a Monday night.

== Tuesday ==
Network		8:00 PM	8:30 PM	9:00 PM	9:30 PM	10:00 PM	10:30 PM
ABC	Fall	Home Improvement (10/11.0)	**The Hughleys**	Spin City (25/9.2) (Tied with Walker, Texas Ranger and Dateline Friday)	**Sports Night**	NYPD Blue (12/10.5)	
ABC	Winter	Home Improvement (10/11.0)	**The Hughleys**	Spin City (25/9.2) (Tied with Walker, Texas Ranger and Dateline Friday)	**Sports Night**	NYPD Blue (12/10.5)	
ABC	Spring	Home Improvement (10/11.0)	**The Hughleys**	Spin City (25/9.2) (Tied with Walker, Texas Ranger and Dateline Friday)	**Sports Night**	**Strange World**	
ABC	Mid-spring	Home Improvement (10/11.0)	**The Hughleys**	Spin City (25/9.2) (Tied with Walker, Texas Ranger and Dateline Friday)	**Sports Night**	NYPD Blue (12/10.5)	
ABC	Summer	Home Improvement (10/11.0)	**The Hughleys**	Spin City (25/9.2) (Tied with Walker, Texas Ranger and Dateline Friday)	**Sports Night**	NYPD Blue (12/10.5)	
ABC	Mid-summer	Spin City (25/9.2) (Tied with Walker, Texas Ranger and Dateline Friday)	**It's Like, You Know...** (R)	Dharma & Greg (R)	**Sports Night**	NYPD Blue (12/10.5)	
ABC	Late summer	Spin City (25/9.2) (Tied with Walker, Texas Ranger and Dateline Friday)	**Who Wants to Be a Millionaire**	Dharma & Greg (R)	**Sports Night**	NYPD Blue (12/10.5)	
CBS	Fall	JAG (16/9.8) (Tied with Providence and 20/20 Wednesday)		CBS Tuesday Movie (19/9.7) (Tied with Becker, Dateline Monday and Dateline Tuesday)			
CBS	Winter	JAG (16/9.8) (Tied with Providence and 20/20 Wednesday)		CBS Tuesday Movie (19/9.7) (Tied with Becker, Dateline Monday and Dateline Tuesday)			
CBS	Spring	JAG (16/9.8) (Tied with Providence and 20/20 Wednesday)		CBS Tuesday Movie (19/9.7) (Tied with Becker, Dateline Monday and Dateline Tuesday)			
CBS	Summer	JAG (16/9.8) (Tied with Providence and 20/20 Wednesday)		**60 Minutes II**		48 Hours	
Fox	Fall	King of the Hill	**Costello**	Guinness World Records Primetime		Local programming	
Fox	Mid-fall	King of the Hill	King of the Hill (R)	Guinness World Records Primetime		Local programming	
Fox	Late fall	King of the Hill	**Holding the Baby**	Guinness World Records Primetime		Local programming	
Fox	Winter	King of the Hill	**The PJs**	Guinness World Records Primetime		Local programming	
Fox	Spring	King of the Hill	**Futurama**	**The PJs**	King of the Hill (R)	Local programming	
Fox	Summer	Guinness World Records Primetime		Fox Files		Local programming	
NBC	Fall	Mad About You	**Encore! Encore!**	Just Shoot Me!	Working	Dateline Tuesday (19/9.7) (Tied with Becker, Dateline Monday and the CBS Tuesday Movie)	
NBC	Winter	3rd Rock from the Sun	NewsRadio	Just Shoot Me!	**Will & Grace**	Dateline Tuesday (19/9.7) (Tied with Becker, Dateline Monday and the CBS Tuesday Movie)	
NBC	Spring	NewsRadio	3rd Rock from the Sun	Just Shoot Me!	**Everything's Relative**	Dateline Tuesday (19/9.7) (Tied with Becker, Dateline Monday and the CBS Tuesday Movie)	
NBC	Mid-spring	3rd Rock from the Sun	NewsRadio	Just Shoot Me!	3rd Rock from the Sun (R)	Dateline Tuesday (19/9.7) (Tied with Becker, Dateline Monday and the CBS Tuesday Movie)	
NBC	Summer	3rd Rock from the Sun	NewsRadio	Just Shoot Me!	**Will & Grace**	Dateline Tuesday (19/9.7) (Tied with Becker, Dateline Monday and the CBS Tuesday Movie)	
NBC	Mid-summer	Just Shoot Me! (R)	3rd Rock from the Sun	Just Shoot Me!	**Will & Grace**	Dateline Tuesday (19/9.7) (Tied with Becker, Dateline Monday and the CBS Tuesday Movie)	
UPN	Fall	Moesha	Clueless	**Mercy Point**		Local programming	
UPN	Mid-fall	Moesha	Clueless	**America's Greatest Pets**	**Reunited**	Local programming	
UPN	Winter	Moesha	Clueless	Malcolm & Eddie	Between Brothers	Local programming	
UPN	Spring	Moesha	**Family Rules**	Malcolm & Eddie	Between Brothers	Local programming	
UPN	Mid-spring	Moesha	Clueless	Malcolm & Eddie	Between Brothers	Local programming	
UPN	Summer	Moesha	Clueless	Malcolm & Eddie	Between Brothers	Local programming	
The WB		Buffy the Vampire Slayer		**Felicity**		Local programming	

NOTE: On Fox, Brimstone was supposed to premiere 9-10, but it was moved up to Friday.

== Wednesday ==
Network		8:00 PM	8:30 PM	9:00 PM	9:30 PM	10:00 PM	10:30 PM
ABC	Fall	Dharma & Greg (24/9.3)	Two Guys, a Girl and a Pizza Place	The Drew Carey Show (14/9.9) (Tied with 20/20 Friday)	**The Secret Lives of Men**	20/20 Wednesday (16/9.8) (Tied with Providence and JAG)	
ABC	Winter	Dharma & Greg (24/9.3)	Two Guys, a Girl and a Pizza Place	The Drew Carey Show (14/9.9) (Tied with 20/20 Friday)	**Whose Line Is It Anyway?**	20/20 Wednesday (16/9.8) (Tied with Providence and JAG)	
ABC	Spring	Dharma & Greg (24/9.3)	**It's Like, You Know...**	The Drew Carey Show (14/9.9) (Tied with 20/20 Friday)	**The Norm Show**	20/20 Wednesday (16/9.8) (Tied with Providence and JAG)	
ABC	Summer	Dharma & Greg (24/9.3)	Two Guys, a Girl and a Pizza Place	The Drew Carey Show (14/9.9) (Tied with 20/20 Friday)	**Whose Line Is It Anyway?**	20/20 Wednesday (16/9.8) (Tied with Providence and JAG)	
ABC	Mid-summer	Two Guys, a Girl and a Pizza Place	**The Norm Show**	The Drew Carey Show (14/9.9) (Tied with 20/20 Friday)	**Whose Line Is It Anyway?**	20/20 Wednesday (16/9.8) (Tied with Providence and JAG)	
ABC	Late summer	Two Guys, a Girl and a Pizza Place	**Who Wants to Be a Millionaire**	The Drew Carey Show (14/9.9) (Tied with 20/20 Friday)	Two Guys, a Girl and a Pizza Place (R)	20/20 Wednesday (16/9.8) (Tied with Providence and JAG)	
CBS	Fall	The Nanny	**Maggie Winters**	**To Have & to Hold**		Chicago Hope	
CBS	Winter	The Nanny	**Maggie Winters**	**60 Minutes II** (30/9.0) (Tied with Diagnosis: Murder)		Chicago Hope	
CBS	Spring	Cosby	**Payne**	**60 Minutes II** (30/9.0) (Tied with Diagnosis: Murder)		Chicago Hope	
CBS	Summer	The Nanny	The Nanny	CBS Wednesday Movie			
CBS	Mid-summer	Cosby	Cosby	CBS Wednesday Movie			
CBS	Late summer	Cosby	CBS Wednesday Movie				
Fox	Fall	Beverly Hills, 90210		Party of Five		Local programming	
Fox	Winter	Beverly Hills, 90210		Party of Five		Local programming	
Fox	Spring	Beverly Hills, 90210		Party of Five		Local programming	
Fox	Summer	Fox Wednesday Night Movie				Local programming	
NBC	Fall	Dateline NBC		3rd Rock from the Sun	NewsRadio	Law & Order (13/10.1)	
NBC	Mid-fall	Dateline NBC		3rd Rock from the Sun	**Encore! Encore!**	Law & Order (13/10.1)	
NBC	Winter	Dateline NBC		LateLine	**Encore! Encore!**	Law & Order (13/10.1)	
NBC	Spring	Dateline NBC		**World's Most Amazing Videos**		Law & Order (13/10.1)	
NBC	Summer	Dateline NBC		**World's Most Amazing Videos**		Law & Order (13/10.1)	
UPN		**Seven Days**		Star Trek: Voyager		Local programming	
The WB		Dawson's Creek		**Charmed**		Local programming	

== Thursday ==
Network		8:00 PM	8:30 PM	9:00 PM	9:30 PM	10:00 PM	10:30 PM
ABC	Fall	**Vengeance Unlimited**		ABC Thursday Night Movie			
ABC	Mid-fall	Special programming		ABC Thursday Night Movie			
ABC	Winter	**Vengeance Unlimited**		ABC Thursday Night Movie			
ABC	Mid-winter	**Vengeance Unlimited**		**Cupid**		ABC News Specials	
ABC	Spring	America's Funniest Home Videos		The Drew Carey Show (R)	Spin City (R)	ABC News Specials	
ABC	Summer	ABC Thursday Night Movie				**Vanished**	
ABC	Late summer	**Whose Line Is It Anyway?**	**Who Wants to Be a Millionaire**	Special programming		Nightline in Primetime	
CBS	Fall	Promised Land		Diagnosis: Murder (30/9.0) (Tied with 60 Minutes II)		48 Hours	
CBS	Winter	Diagnosis: Murder (30/9.0) (Tied with 60 Minutes II)		**Turks**		48 Hours	
CBS	Spring	Promised Land		**Turks**		48 Hours	
CBS	Mid-spring	Promised Land		Diagnosis: Murder (30/9.0) (Tied with 60 Minutes II)		48 Hours	
CBS	Summer	Diagnosis: Murder (R)		Diagnosis: Murder (30/9.0) (Tied with 60 Minutes II)		48 Hours	
Fox	Fall	World's Wildest Police Videos		Fox Files		Local programming	
Fox	Mid-fall	World's Wildest Police Videos		Special programming		Local programming	
Fox	Late fall	World's Wildest Police Videos		Fox Files		Local programming	
Fox	Winter	World's Wildest Police Videos		Special programming		Local programming	
Fox	Spring	World's Wildest Police Videos		Fox Files		Local programming	
Fox	Mid-spring	World's Wildest Police Videos		Special programming		Local programming	
Fox	Summer	World's Wildest Police Videos		**Family Guy** (R)	**The PJs** (R)	Local programming	
NBC	Fall	Friends (2/15.7)	**Jesse** (5/13.7) (Tied with Veronica's Closet)	Frasier (3/15.6)	Veronica's Closet (5/13.7) (Tied with Jesse)	ER (1/17.8)	
NBC	Winter	Friends (2/15.7)	**Jesse** (5/13.7) (Tied with Veronica's Closet)	Frasier (3/15.6)	Veronica's Closet (5/13.7) (Tied with Jesse)	ER (1/17.8)	
NBC	Spring	Friends (2/15.7)	**Will & Grace**	Frasier (3/15.6)	Veronica's Closet (5/13.7) (Tied with Jesse)	ER (1/17.8)	
NBC	Summer	Friends (2/15.7)	**Jesse** (5/13.7) (Tied with Veronica's Closet)	Frasier (3/15.6)	**Will & Grace**	ER (1/17.8)	
NBC	Late summer	Friends (2/15.7)	**Jesse** (5/13.7) (Tied with Veronica's Closet)	Frasier (3/15.6)	Frasier (R)	ER (1/17.8)	
UPN	Fall	**UPN Thursday Night at the Movies**				Local programming	
UPN	Winter	**UPN Thursday Night at the Movies**				Local programming	
UPN	Spring	**UPN Thursday Night at the Movies**				Local programming	
UPN	Summer	**UPN Thursday Night at the Movies**				Local programming	
UPN	Mid-summer	**Mercy Point**		**Mercy Point**		Local programming	
UPN	Late summer	Special programming				Local programming	
The WB	Fall	The Wayans Bros.	The Jamie Foxx Show	The Steve Harvey Show	For Your Love	Local programming	
The WB	Winter	The Wayans Bros.	The Jamie Foxx Show	The Steve Harvey Show	For Your Love	Local programming	
The WB	Spring	Smart Guy	The Jamie Foxx Show	The Steve Harvey Show	For Your Love	Local programming	
The WB	Mid-spring	The Wayans Bros.	The Jamie Foxx Show	The Steve Harvey Show	For Your Love	Local programming	
The WB	Summer	The Wayans Bros.	The Jamie Foxx Show	The Steve Harvey Show	For Your Love	Local programming	

Note: On Fox, Hollyweird was supposed to premiere 9:00-10:00 but it was canceled due to a conflict with Shaun Cassidy.

== Friday ==
Network		8:00 PM	8:30 PM	9:00 PM	9:30 PM	10:00 PM	10:30 PM
ABC	Fall	**Two of a Kind**	Boy Meets World	Sabrina the Teenage Witch	**Brother's Keeper**	20/20 Friday (14/9.9) (Tied with The Drew Carey Show)	
ABC	Winter	**Two of a Kind**	Boy Meets World	Sabrina the Teenage Witch	**Brother's Keeper**	20/20 Friday (14/9.9) (Tied with The Drew Carey Show)	
ABC	Spring	Sabrina the Teenage Witch	Boy Meets World	Two Guys, a Girl and a Pizza Place	**Brother's Keeper**	20/20 Friday (14/9.9) (Tied with The Drew Carey Show)	
ABC	Mid-spring	Home Improvement (R)	Boy Meets World	Sabrina the Teenage Witch	**Brother's Keeper**	20/20 Friday (14/9.9) (Tied with The Drew Carey Show)	
ABC	Summer	**Two of a Kind**	Boy Meets World	Sabrina the Teenage Witch	**Brother's Keeper**	20/20 Friday (14/9.9) (Tied with The Drew Carey Show)	
ABC	Mid-summer	Home Improvement (R)	**The Hughleys** (R)	Sabrina the Teenage Witch	Boy Meets World	20/20 Friday (14/9.9) (Tied with The Drew Carey Show)	
ABC	Late summer	Home Improvement (R)	**Who Wants to Be a Millionaire**	Sabrina the Teenage Witch	Boy Meets World	20/20 Friday (14/9.9) (Tied with The Drew Carey Show)	
CBS	Fall	Kids Say the Darndest Things	Candid Camera	**Buddy Faro**		Nash Bridges	
CBS	Winter	Kids Say the Darndest Things	Candid Camera	The Magnificent Seven		Nash Bridges	
CBS	Spring	Kids Say the Darndest Things	Candid Camera	Unsolved Mysteries		Nash Bridges	
CBS	Mid-spring	Kids Say the Darndest Things	Candid Camera	Special programming		Nash Bridges	
CBS	Summer	Kids Say the Darndest Things	Candid Camera	Unsolved Mysteries		Nash Bridges	
CBS	Mid-summer	Kids Say the Darndest Things	Candid Camera	The Magnificent Seven		Nash Bridges	
Fox	Fall	**Living in Captivity**	Getting Personal	Millennium		Local programming	
Fox	Mid-fall	**Brimstone**		Millennium		Local programming	
Fox	Winter	**Brimstone**		Millennium		Local programming	
Fox	Spring	Guinness World Records Primetime		Millennium		Local programming	
Fox	Summer	The World's Funniest!		MADtv Primetime		Local programming	
NBC	Fall	Dateline Friday (25/9.2) (Tied with Spin City and Walker, Texas Ranger)		**Trinity**		Homicide: Life on the Street	
NBC	Mid-fall	Dateline Friday (25/9.2) (Tied with Spin City and Walker, Texas Ranger)		Law & Order (R)		Homicide: Life on the Street	
NBC	Winter	**Providence** (16/9.8) (Tied with 20/20 Wednesday and JAG)		Dateline Friday (25/9.2) (Tied with Spin City and Walker, Texas Ranger)		Homicide: Life on the Street	
NBC	Spring	**Providence** (16/9.8) (Tied with 20/20 Wednesday and JAG)		Dateline Friday (25/9.2) (Tied with Spin City and Walker, Texas Ranger)		Homicide: Life on the Street	
NBC	Summer	Dateline Friday (25/9.2) (Tied with Spin City and Walker, Texas Ranger)		NBA on NBC			
NBC	Mid-summer	**Providence** (16/9.8) (Tied with 20/20 Wednesday and JAG)		Dateline Friday (25/9.2) (Tied with Spin City and Walker, Texas Ranger)		Homicide: Life on the Street	
NBC	Late summer	**Providence** (16/9.8) (Tied with 20/20 Wednesday and JAG)		Dateline Friday (25/9.2) (Tied with Spin City and Walker, Texas Ranger)			
UPN	Fall	**Legacy**		Love Boat: The Next Wave		Local programming	
UPN	Winter	**Legacy**		Love Boat: The Next Wave		Local programming	
UPN	Spring	**America's Greatest Pets**	**America's Greatest Pets**	Love Boat: The Next Wave		Local programming	
UPN	Summer	**America's Greatest Pets**	**America's Greatest Pets**	Love Boat: The Next Wave		Local programming	
UPN	Mid-summer	**Legacy**		Love Boat: The Next Wave		Local programming	
UPN	Late summer	**UPN's Night at the Movies**				Local programming	

Note: On Fox, the one-hour drama Brimstone premiered at 8:00 on October 23, 1998.

== Saturday ==
Network		8:00 p.m.	8:30 p.m.	9:00 p.m.	9:30 p.m.	10:00 p.m.	10:30 p.m.
ABC	Fall	America's Funniest Home Videos		**Fantasy Island**		**Cupid**	
ABC	Winter	**ABC Big Picture Show**				**Fantasy Island**	
ABC	Mid-winter	Special programming					
ABC	Spring	America's Funniest Home Videos	**The Big Moment**	**ABC Big Picture Show**			
ABC	Mid-spring	America's Funniest Home Videos		**ABC Big Picture Show**			
ABC	Summer	America's Funniest Home Videos	**The Big Moment**	**ABC Big Picture Show**			
ABC	Mid-summer	America's Funniest Home Videos		**ABC Big Picture Show**			
ABC	Late summer	America's Funniest Home Videos	**Who Wants to Be a Millionaire**	**ABC Big Picture Show**			
CBS	Fall	Early Edition		**Martial Law**		Walker, Texas Ranger (25/9.2) (Tied with Spin City and Dateline Friday)	
CBS	Winter	Early Edition		**Martial Law**		**Sons of Thunder**	
CBS	Spring	Early Edition		**Martial Law**		Walker, Texas Ranger (25/9.2) (Tied with Spin City and Dateline Friday)	
CBS	Summer	Early Edition		**Martial Law**		Walker, Texas Ranger (25/9.2) (Tied with Spin City and Dateline Friday)	
Fox		COPS	COPS (R)	America's Most Wanted: America Fights Back		Local programming	
NBC	Fall	**Wind on Water**		The Pretender		Profiler	
NBC	Winter	Special programming		The Pretender		Profiler	
NBC	Spring	Special programming		The Pretender		Profiler	
NBC	Summer	The Pretender		NBC Saturday Night At The Movies			

== By network ==
=== ABC ===
Returning series

- 20/20
- The ABC Monday Night Movie
- ABC Thursday Night Movie
- America's Funniest Home Videos
- Boy Meets World
- Dharma & Greg
- The Drew Carey Show
- Home Improvement
- Monday Night Football
- NYPD Blue
- The Practice
- Sabrina the Teenage Witch
- Spin City
- Two Guys, a Girl and a Pizza Place
- The Wonderful World of Disney

New series

- **ABC Big Picture Show**
- **The Big Moment** *
- **Brother's Keeper**
- **Cupid**
- **Fantasy Island**
- **The Hughleys**
- **It's Like, You Know...** *
- **The Norm Show** *
- **The Secret Lives of Men**
- **Sports Night**
- **Strange World** *
- **Two of a Kind**
- **Vengeance Unlimited**
- **Whose Line Is It Anyway?**

Not returning from 1997–98:

- ABC News Saturday Night
- The ABC Sunday Night Movie
- C-16: FBI
- Cracker
- Ellen
- Grace Under Fire
- Hiller and Diller
- Maximum Bob
- Nothing Sacred
- Over the Top
- Prey
- Primetime Live
- Push
- Soul Man
- Something So Right
- Teen Angel
- That's Life
- Timecop
- Total Security
- You Wish

=== CBS ===
Returning series

- 48 Hours
- 60 Minutes
- Candid Camera
- CBS Sunday Movie
- Chicago Hope
- Cosby
- Diagnosis: Murder
- Early Edition
- Everybody Loves Raymond
- JAG
- Kids Say the Darndest Things
- The Magnificent Seven
- The Nanny
- Nash Bridges
- Promised Land
- Touched by an Angel
- Unsolved Mysteries
- Walker, Texas Ranger

New series

- **60 Minutes II**
- **Becker** *
- **The Brian Benben Show**
- **Buddy Faro**
- **The King of Queens**
- **L.A. Doctors**
- **Maggie Winters**
- **Martial Law**
- **Payne** *
- **Sons of Thunder** *
- **Thanks** *
- **To Have & to Hold**
- **Turks** *

Not returning from 1997–98:

- Brooklyn South
- The Closer
- Cybill
- Dellaventura
- Dr. Quinn, Medicine Woman
- Family Matters
- Four Corners
- George and Leo
- The Gregory Hines Show
- Meego
- Michael Hayes
- Murphy Brown (revived in 2018–19)
- Public Eye with Bryant Gumbel
- The Simple Life
- Step by Step
- Style & Substance

=== Fox ===
Returning series

- Ally McBeal
- America's Most Wanted: America Fights Back
- Beverly Hills, 90210
- COPS
- Fox Files
- FOX Night at the Movies
- Guinness World Records Primetime
- Getting Personal
- King of the Hill
- Melrose Place
- Millennium
- Party of Five
- The Simpsons
- The World's Funniest!
- World's Wildest Police Videos
- The X-Files

**New series**

- **Brimstone**
- **Costello**
- **Family Guy** *
- **Futurama** *
- **Holding the Baby** *
- **Living in Captivity**
- **The PJs** *
- **That '70s Show**

Not returning from 1997–98:

- 413 Hope St.
- Ask Harriet
- Between Brothers (moved to UPN)
- Damon
- Living Single
- New York Undercover
- Significant Others
- The Visitor

=== NBC ===
Returning series

- 3rd Rock from the Sun
- Caroline in the City
- Dateline NBC
- ER
- Frasier
- Friends
- Homicide: Life on the Street
- Just Shoot Me!
- LateLine
- Law & Order
- Mad About You
- NBC Sunday Night Movie
- NBC Saturday Night At The Movies
- The NBC Monday Movie
- NewsRadio
- The Pretender
- Profiler
- Suddenly Susan
- Veronica's Closet
- Working

New series

- **Conrad Bloom**
- **Encore! Encore!**
- **Everything's Relative** *
- **Jesse**
- **Providence** *
- **Trinity**
- **Will & Grace**
- **Wind on Water**
- **World's Most Amazing Videos** *

Not returning from 1997–98:

- Built to Last
- Fired Up
- For Your Love (moved to The WB)
- House Rules
- Jenny
- Men Behaving Badly
- The Naked Truth
- Players
- Seinfeld
- Sleepwalkers
- Stressed Eric
- The Tony Danza Show
- Union Square

=== UPN ===
Returning series

- Between Brothers (moved from Fox)
- Clueless
- In The House
- Love Boat: The Next Wave
- Malcolm & Eddie
- Moesha
- The Sentinel
- Star Trek: Voyager

New series

- **America's Greatest Pets** *
- **Dilbert** *
- **DiResta**
- **Family Rules** *
- **Guys Like Us**
- **Home Movies** *
- **Legacy**
- **Mercy Point**
- **Power Play** (originally aired on CTV)
- **Redhanded** *
- **Reunited** *
- **The Secret Diary of Desmond Pfeiffer**
- **Seven Days**
- **UPN's Night at the Movies**

Not returning from 1997–98:

- Good News
- Head Over Heels
- Hitz
- Sparks

=== The WB ===
Returning series

- 7th Heaven
- Buffy the Vampire Slayer
- Dawson's Creek
- For Your Love (moved from NBC)
- The Jamie Foxx Show
- The Parent 'Hood
- Sister, Sister
- Smart Guy
- The Steve Harvey Show
- Unhappily Ever After
- The Wayans Bros.

New series

- **The Army Show**
- **Charmed**
- **Felicity**
- **Hyperion Bay**
- **Katie Joplin** *
- **Movie Stars** *
- **Rescue 77** *
- **Zoe, Duncan, Jack and Jane** *

Not returning from 1997–98:

- Alright Already
- Invasion America
- Kelly Kelly
- Nick Freno: Licensed Teacher
- Three
- The Tom Show
- You're the One

Note: The * indicates that the program was introduced in midseason.
