= 1999–2000 United States network television schedule =

Television schedule for the fall of 1999

The 1999–2000 network television schedule for the six major English language commercial broadcast networks in the United States covers primetime hours from September 1999 through August 2000. The schedule is followed by a list per network of returning series, new series, and series cancelled after the 1998–99 season.

PBS is not included; member stations have local flexibility over most of their schedules and broadcast times for network shows may vary. Also not included are stations affiliated with Pax TV; although Pax carried a limited schedule of first-run programs, its schedule otherwise was composed mainly of syndicated reruns.

New series highlighted in bold.

All times are U.S. Eastern and Pacific Time (except for some live sports or events). Subtract for one hour for Central, Mountain, Alaska and Hawaii–Aleutian times.

Each of the 30 highest-rated shows is listed with its rank and rating as determined by Nielsen Media Research.

This is the fall season of The WB expanding six nights a week for the first time with the debut of the Friday night comedies from fall 1999.

== Legend ==
- Light blue indicates local programming.
- Gray indicates encore programming.
- Blue-gray indicates news programming.
- Light green indicates sporting events.
- Light purple indicates movies.
- Red indicates series being burned off and other regularly scheduled programs, including specials.
- Yellow indicates the top-10 most watched programs of the season.
- Cyan indicates the top-20 most watched programs of the season.
- Magenta indicates the top-30 most watched programs of the season.

== Sunday ==
Network		7:00 p.m.	7:30 p.m.	8:00 p.m.	8:30 p.m.	9:00 p.m.	9:30 p.m.	10:00 p.m.	10:30 p.m.
ABC	Fall	The Wonderful World of Disney				**Snoops**		The Practice (9/11.8)	
ABC	Mid-fall	The Wonderful World of Disney				**Who Wants to Be a Millionaire**		The Practice (9/11.8)	
ABC	Late fall	The Wonderful World of Disney				**Snoops**		The Practice (9/11.8)	
ABC	Winter	The Wonderful World of Disney				**Who Wants to Be a Millionaire** (3/17.0)		The Practice (9/11.8)	
ABC	Spring	The Wonderful World of Disney				**Who Wants to Be a Millionaire** (3/17.0)		The Practice (9/11.8)	
ABC	Summer	The Wonderful World of Disney				**Who Wants to Be a Millionaire** (3/17.0)		The Practice (9/11.8)	
CBS		60 Minutes (8/12.0)		Touched by an Angel (10/11.6)		CBS Sunday Movie (14/10.9)			
Fox	Fall	The World's Funniest!	King of the Hill	The Simpsons	Futurama	The X-Files		Local programming	
Fox	Winter	Futurama	King of the Hill	The Simpsons	**Malcolm in the Middle** (28/8.9) (Tied with Dateline Friday)	The X-Files		Local programming	
Fox	Spring	Futurama	King of the Hill	The Simpsons	**Malcolm in the Middle** (28/8.9) (Tied with Dateline Friday)	The X-Files		Local programming	
Fox	Summer	Futurama	King of the Hill	The Simpsons	**Malcolm in the Middle** (28/8.9) (Tied with Dateline Friday)	The X-Files		Local programming	
NBC	Fall	Dateline Sunday		**Third Watch**		NBC Sunday Night Movie			
NBC	Winter	Dateline Sunday		**Twenty-One**		NBC Sunday Night Movie			
NBC	Spring	World's Most Amazing Videos		Dateline Sunday		NBC Sunday Night Movie			
NBC	Summer	World's Most Amazing Videos		Dateline Sunday		NBC Sunday Night Movie			
The WB	Fall	7th Heaven Beginnings (R)		Felicity		**Jack & Jill**		Local programming	
The WB	Mid-fall	**Safe Harbor**		Felicity		**Jack & Jill**		Local programming	
The WB	Winter	7th Heaven Beginnings (R)		Felicity		**Jack & Jill**		Local programming	
The WB	Spring	7th Heaven Beginnings (R)		**D.C.**		Movie Stars	Zoe...	Local programming	
The WB	Mid-spring	7th Heaven Beginnings (R)		Charmed (R)		Movie Stars	Zoe...	Local programming	
The WB	Summer	7th Heaven Beginnings (R)		The Steve Harvey Show (R)	For Your Love (R)	The Jamie Foxx Show (R)	**Mission Hill**	Local programming	
The WB	Mid-summer	7th Heaven Beginnings (R)		The Steve Harvey Show (R)	For Your Love (R)	The Jamie Foxx Show (R)	For Your Love (R)	Local programming	

== Monday ==
Network		8:00 p.m.	8:30 p.m.	9:00 p.m.	9:30 p.m.	10:00 p.m.	10:30 p.m.
ABC	Fall	20/20 Monday		Monday Night Football (6/13.5)			
ABC	Mid-fall	**Who Wants to Be a Millionaire**		Monday Night Football (6/13.5)			
ABC	Late fall	20/20 Monday		Monday Night Football (6/13.5)			
ABC	Winter	The ABC Monday Night Movie (26/9.0) (Tied with **Family Law**)				**Once and Again**	
ABC	Spring	The ABC Monday Night Movie (26/9.0) (Tied with **Family Law**)				**Once and Again**	
ABC	Summer	The ABC Monday Night Movie (26/9.0) (Tied with **Family Law**)				**Once and Again**	
CBS	Fall	The King of Queens	**Ladies Man**	Everybody Loves Raymond (12/11.4) (Tied with Jesse)	Becker (18/10.4) (Tied with Dharma & Greg)	**Family Law** (26/9.0) (Tied with The ABC Monday Night Movie)	
CBS	Winter	The King of Queens	**Ladies Man**	Everybody Loves Raymond (12/11.4) (Tied with Jesse)	Becker (18/10.4) (Tied with Dharma & Greg)	**Family Law** (26/9.0) (Tied with The ABC Monday Night Movie)	
CBS	Spring	The King of Queens	**Grapevine**	Everybody Loves Raymond (12/11.4) (Tied with Jesse)	Becker (18/10.4) (Tied with Dharma & Greg)	**Family Law** (26/9.0) (Tied with The ABC Monday Night Movie)	
CBS	Mid-spring	The King of Queens	**Ladies Man**	Everybody Loves Raymond (12/11.4) (Tied with Jesse)	Becker (18/10.4) (Tied with Dharma & Greg)	**Family Law** (26/9.0) (Tied with The ABC Monday Night Movie)	
CBS	Summer	The King of Queens	The King of Queens (R)	Everybody Loves Raymond (12/11.4) (Tied with Jesse)	Becker (18/10.4) (Tied with Dharma & Greg)	**Family Law** (26/9.0) (Tied with The ABC Monday Night Movie)	
CBS	Mid-summer	**Big Brother**	The King of Queens	Everybody Loves Raymond (12/11.4) (Tied with Jesse)	Becker (18/10.4) (Tied with Dharma & Greg)	**Family Law** (26/9.0) (Tied with The ABC Monday Night Movie)	
Fox	Fall	**Time of Your Life**		Ally McBeal		Local programming	
Fox	Winter	**Time of Your Life**		Ally McBeal		Local programming	
Fox	Mid-winter	That '70s Show	That '70s Show (R)	Ally McBeal		Local programming	
Fox	Spring	That '70s Show	**Titus**	Ally McBeal		Local programming	
Fox	Summer	**Opposite Sex**		Ally McBeal		Local programming	
NBC	Fall	Suddenly Susan	Veronica's Closet	**Law & Order: Special Victims Unit**		Dateline Monday	
NBC	Winter	**Freaks and Geeks**		Dateline Monday		**Third Watch**	
NBC	Mid-winter	**Twenty-One**		Dateline Monday		**Third Watch**	
NBC	Spring	**Twenty-One**		**Freaks and Geeks**		**Third Watch**	
NBC	Mid-spring	Dateline Monday		Law & Order (R)		**Third Watch**	
NBC	Summer	**Mysterious Ways**		Law & Order (R)		**Third Watch**	
UPN		Moesha	**The Parkers**	**Grown Ups**	Malcolm & Eddie	Local programming	
The WB	Fall	7th Heaven		**Safe Harbor**		Local programming	
The WB	Mid-fall	7th Heaven		7th Heaven (R)		Local programming	
The WB	Late fall	7th Heaven		**Jack & Jill** (R)		Local programming	
The WB	Winter	7th Heaven		Zoe...	**Brutally Normal**	Local programming	
The WB	Mid-winter	7th Heaven		**Popular** (R)		Local programming	
The WB	Spring	7th Heaven		Buffy the Vampire Slayer (R)		Local programming	
The WB	Mid-spring	7th Heaven		**Roswell**		Local programming	
The WB	Summer	7th Heaven		**Roswell**		Local programming	

== Tuesday ==
Network		8:00 p.m.	8:30 p.m.	9:00 p.m.	9:30 p.m.	10:00 p.m.	10:30 p.m.
ABC	Fall	Spin City	It's Like, You Know...	Dharma & Greg (18/10.4) (Tied with Becker)	Sports Night	**Once and Again**	
ABC	Mid-fall	Spin City	**Who Wants to Be a Millionaire**	Dharma & Greg (18/10.4) (Tied with Becker)	Sports Night	**Once and Again**	
ABC	Late fall	Spin City	**Oh, Grow Up**	Dharma & Greg (18/10.4) (Tied with Becker)	Sports Night	**Once and Again**	
ABC	Winter	**Who Wants to Be a Millionaire** (1/18.6)		Dharma & Greg (18/10.4) (Tied with Becker)	Sports Night	NYPD Blue (17/10.7)	
ABC	Spring	**Who Wants to Be a Millionaire** (1/18.6)		Dharma & Greg (18/10.4) (Tied with Becker)	**Talk to Me**	NYPD Blue (17/10.7)	
ABC	Mid-spring	**Who Wants to Be a Millionaire** (1/18.6)		Dharma & Greg (18/10.4) (Tied with Becker)	Sports Night	NYPD Blue (17/10.7)	
ABC	Summer	**Who Wants to Be a Millionaire** (1/18.6)		Dharma & Greg (18/10.4) (Tied with Becker)	Two Guys and a Girl (R)	NYPD Blue (17/10.7)	
ABC	Late summer	**Who Wants to Be a Millionaire** (1/18.6)		Dharma & Greg (18/10.4) (Tied with Becker)	Norm (R)	NYPD Blue (17/10.7)	
CBS	Fall	JAG (21/9.7)		60 Minutes II (24/9.3)		**Judging Amy** (20/10.2)	
CBS	Winter	JAG (21/9.7)		60 Minutes II (24/9.3)		**Judging Amy** (20/10.2)	
CBS	Spring	JAG (21/9.7)		60 Minutes II (24/9.3)		**Judging Amy** (20/10.2)	
CBS	Summer	**Big Brother**	**Love & Money**	60 Minutes II (24/9.3)		**Judging Amy** (20/10.2)	
CBS	Mid-summer	**Big Brother**	**Ladies Man** (R)	60 Minutes II (24/9.3)		**Judging Amy** (20/10.2)	
Fox	Fall	**Ally** (R)	That '70s Show	Party of Five		Local programming	
Fox	Late fall	That '70s Show	**Ally** (R)	Party of Five		Local programming	
Fox	Winter	That '70s Show	**Malcolm in the Middle** (R)	Party of Five		Local programming	
Fox	Mid-winter	Special programming		Party of Five		Local programming	
Fox	Spring	That '70s Show (R)	Family Guy	Party of Five		Local programming	
Fox	Mid-spring	Special programming				Local programming	
Fox	Summer	Family Guy	The PJs	Family Guy	The PJs	Local programming	
Fox	Mid-summer	That '70s Show (R)	**Titus** (R)	Family Guy	The PJs	Local programming	
NBC	Fall	Just Shoot Me!	3rd Rock from the Sun	Will & Grace	**The Mike O'Malley Show**	Dateline NBC	
NBC	Mid-fall	Just Shoot Me!	3rd Rock from the Sun	Will & Grace	Just Shoot Me! (R)	Dateline NBC	
NBC	Winter	Just Shoot Me!	3rd Rock from the Sun	Will & Grace	Veronica's Closet	Dateline NBC	
NBC	Spring	3rd Rock from the Sun	**God, the Devil and Bob**	Will & Grace	Just Shoot Me!	Dateline NBC	
NBC	Mid-spring	3rd Rock from the Sun	Frasier (R)	Will & Grace	Just Shoot Me!	Dateline NBC	
NBC	Summer	Suddenly Susan	Veronica's Closet	Will & Grace	**M.Y.O.B.**	Dateline NBC	
NBC	Late summer	3rd Rock from the Sun	**Sammy**	Frasier (R)	Just Shoot Me!	Dateline NBC	
UPN	Fall	**Shasta McNasty**	Dilbert	**The Strip**		Local programming	
UPN	Winter	**Shasta McNasty**	Dilbert	**I Dare You: The Ultimate Challenge**		Local programming	
UPN	Late winter	**Secret Agent Man**		**The Beat**		Local programming	
UPN	Spring	**The Parkers** (R)	Moesha (R)	**The Beat**		Local programming	
UPN	Mid-spring	**The Parkers** (R)	Moesha (R)	**I Dare You: The Ultimate Challenge**		Local programming	
UPN	Summer	**Shasta McNasty**	Dilbert	**I Dare You: The Ultimate Challenge**		Local programming	
The WB		Buffy the Vampire Slayer		**Angel**		Local programming	

Note: On Fox, Ally aired as re-edited half-hour repeats of the original hour-long Ally McBeal series. On CBS, Falcone premieres at 9:00 p.m. on April 4, 2000. On UPN, Secret Agent Man was supposed to premiere at 9:00pm, but however due to the show not getting the "buzz" before the fall premiere, The Strip was premiered instead, and the show aired later on in a different night.

== Wednesday ==
Network		8:00 p.m.	8:30 p.m.	9:00 p.m.	9:30 p.m.	10:00 p.m.	10:30 p.m.
ABC	Fall	Two Guys and a Girl	Norm	The Drew Carey Show (22/9.5)	**Oh, Grow Up**	20/20 Wednesday	
ABC	Mid-fall	Two Guys and a Girl	**Who Wants to Be a Millionaire**	The Drew Carey Show (22/9.5)	Norm	20/20 Wednesday	
ABC	Late fall	Two Guys and a Girl	It's Like, You Know...	The Drew Carey Show (22/9.5)	Norm	20/20 Wednesday	
ABC	Winter	Two Guys and a Girl	Norm	The Drew Carey Show (22/9.5)	Spin City	20/20 Wednesday	
ABC	Spring	Two Guys and a Girl	**Then Came You**	The Drew Carey Show (22/9.5)	Spin City	20/20 Wednesday	
ABC	Mid-spring	**Who Wants to Be a Millionaire**		The Drew Carey Show (22/9.5)	Spin City	20/20 Wednesday	
ABC	Summer	**Who Wants to Be a Millionaire**		The Drew Carey Show (22/9.5)	**Clerks**	20/20 Wednesday	
ABC	Mid-summer	Two Guys and a Girl	Norm	The Drew Carey Show (22/9.5)	Spin City	20/20 Wednesday	
CBS	Fall	Cosby	**Work with Me**	CBS Wednesday Movie (30/8.8)			
CBS	Mid-fall	Cosby	The King of Queens (R)	CBS Wednesday Movie (30/8.8)			
CBS	Winter	**City of Angels**		CBS Wednesday Movie (30/8.8)			
CBS	Spring	**City of Angels**		CBS Wednesday Movie (30/8.8)			
CBS	Mid-spring	Special programming		CBS Wednesday Movie (30/8.8)			
CBS	Summer	**Survivor: Borneo**		CBS Wednesday Movie (30/8.8)			
CBS	Mid-summer	**Survivor: Borneo**		**Big Brother**		Various CBS News programming	
Fox	Fall	Beverly Hills, 90210		**Get Real**		Local programming	
Fox	Winter	Beverly Hills, 90210		**Get Real**		Local programming	
Fox	Mid-winter	Beverly Hills, 90210		Special programming		Local programming	
Fox	Spring	Beverly Hills, 90210		**Get Real**		Local programming	
Fox	Mid-spring	Beverly Hills, 90210		Party of Five		Local programming	
Fox	Summer	Special programming		**Time of Your Life**		Local programming	
Fox	Mid-summer	King of the Hill (R)	Family Guy (R)	Guinness World Records Primetime		Local programming	
Fox	Late summer	King of the Hill (R)	Family Guy (R)	**American High**	**American High**	Local programming	
NBC	Fall	Dateline Wednesday		**The West Wing** (25/9.1)		Law & Order (11/11.5)	
NBC	Winter	**Twenty-One**		**The West Wing** (25/9.1)		Law & Order (11/11.5)	
NBC	Spring	Dateline Wednesday		**The West Wing** (25/9.1)		Law & Order (11/11.5)	
NBC	Summer	Dateline Wednesday		**The West Wing** (25/9.1)		Law & Order (11/11.5)	
UPN		Seven Days		Star Trek: Voyager		Local programming	
The WB	Fall	Dawson's Creek		**Roswell**		Local programming	
The WB	Winter	Dawson's Creek		**Roswell**		Local programming	
The WB	Spring	Dawson's Creek		Felicity		Local programming	
The WB	Summer	Dawson's Creek		**Young Americans**		Local programming	

Note: On ABC, Clerks premiered at 9:30 p.m. on May 31, 2000.

== Thursday ==
Network		8:00 p.m.	8:30 p.m.	9:00 p.m.	9:30 p.m.	10:00 p.m.	10:30 p.m.
ABC	Fall	Whose Line Is It Anyway?	Whose Line Is It Anyway?	**Wasteland**		20/20 Downtown	
ABC	Mid-fall	Whose Line Is It Anyway?	Whose Line Is It Anyway?	Special programming		20/20 Downtown	
ABC	Late fall	Whose Line Is It Anyway?	**Who Wants to Be a Millionaire**		Whose Line Is It Anyway?	20/20 Downtown	
ABC	Early winter	Whose Line Is It Anyway?	Whose Line Is It Anyway?	Special programming		20/20 Downtown	
ABC	Winter	Whose Line Is It Anyway?	Whose Line Is It Anyway?	**Who Wants to Be a Millionaire** (2/17.5)		20/20 Downtown	
ABC	Spring	Whose Line Is It Anyway?	Whose Line Is It Anyway?	**Who Wants to Be a Millionaire** (2/17.5)		**Wonderland**	
ABC	Mid-spring	Whose Line Is It Anyway?	Whose Line Is It Anyway?	**Who Wants to Be a Millionaire** (2/17.5)		20/20 Downtown	
ABC	Summer	Whose Line Is It Anyway?	Whose Line Is It Anyway?	**Who Wants to Be a Millionaire** (2/17.5)		20/20 Downtown	
CBS	Fall	Diagnosis: Murder		Chicago Hope		48 Hours	
CBS	Winter	Diagnosis: Murder		Chicago Hope		48 Hours	
CBS	Spring	Diagnosis: Murder		Chicago Hope		48 Hours	
CBS	Summer	Diagnosis: Murder		Diagnosis: Murder (R)		48 Hours	
CBS	Mid-summer	**Big Brother**		**City of Angels** (R)		48 Hours	
Fox	Fall	World's Wildest Police Videos		Family Guy	**Action**	Local programming	
Fox	Mid-fall	Special programming		**Greed**		Local programming	
Fox	Late fall	Guinness World Records Primetime		**Greed**		Local programming	
Fox	Winter	Fox Thursday Night Movie				Local programming	
Fox	Spring	Fox Thursday Night Movie				Local programming	
Fox	Summer	Fox Thursday Night Movie				Local programming	
NBC	Fall	Friends (5/13.8)	Jesse (12/11.4) (Tied with Everybody Loves Raymond)	Frasier (7/13.4)	**Stark Raving Mad** (15/10.8) (Tied with **Daddio**)	ER (4/16.9)	
NBC	Winter	Friends (5/13.8)	Jesse (12/11.4) (Tied with Everybody Loves Raymond)	Frasier (7/13.4)	**Stark Raving Mad** (15/10.8) (Tied with **Daddio**)	ER (4/16.9)	
NBC	Spring	Friends (5/13.8)	**Daddio** (15/10.8) (Tied with **Stark Raving Mad**)	Frasier (7/13.4)	**Battery Park**	ER (4/16.9)	
NBC	Mid-spring	Friends (5/13.8)	Friends (R)	Frasier (7/13.4)	Frasier (R)	ER (4/16.9)	
NBC	Summer	Friends (5/13.8)	3rd Rock from the Sun (R)	Frasier (7/13.4)	Just Shoot Me! (R)	ER (4/16.9)	
NBC	Mid-summer	Friends (5/13.8)	3rd Rock from the Sun (R)	Will & Grace (R)	Just Shoot Me! (R)	ER (4/16.9)	
NBC	Late summer	Friends (5/13.8)	Will & Grace (R)	Will & Grace (R)	Just Shoot Me! (R)	ER (4/16.9)	
UPN		**WWF SmackDown!**				Local programming	
The WB		**Popular**		Charmed		Local programming	

Note: On NBC, the sitcom Daddio premiered on March 23, 2000, at 8:30. On Fox, Family Guy only had two airings and one special Sunday airing, and then on March 7, 2000, the show was moved to Tuesdays. On The WB, Popular premiered Wednesday, September 29, 1999, at 9:00 pm. On Fox, Manchester Prep was supposed to air at 8–9, but it was cancelled at the last minute. On ABC, Then Came You was scheduled to air at 8:30 PM EST, but due to the show not getting the "buzz" before the fall premiere, Whose Line Is It Anyway? was aired at the last minute, and the show aired later on in a different night.

== Friday ==
Network		8:00 p.m.	8:30 p.m.	9:00 p.m.	9:30 p.m.	10:00 p.m.	10:30 p.m.
ABC	Fall	The Hughleys	Boy Meets World	Sabrina the Teenage Witch	**Odd Man Out**	20/20	
ABC	Mid-fall	Boy Meets World	**Odd Man Out**	Sabrina the Teenage Witch	The Hughleys	20/20	
ABC	Late fall	Boy Meets World	**Who Wants to Be a Millionaire**	Sabrina the Teenage Witch	The Hughleys	20/20	
ABC	Early winter	Boy Meets World	**Odd Man Out**	Sabrina the Teenage Witch	The Hughleys	20/20	
ABC	Winter	Boy Meets World	Various programming	Sabrina the Teenage Witch	The Hughleys	20/20	
ABC	Spring	Boy Meets World	The Hughleys	Sabrina the Teenage Witch	**Making the Band**	20/20	
ABC	Summer	Sabrina the Teenage Witch	Boy Meets World	**Making the Band** (R)	**Making the Band**	20/20	
CBS	Fall	Kids Say the Darndest Things	**Love & Money**	**Now and Again**		Nash Bridges	
CBS	Mid-fall	Kids Say the Darndest Things	Candid Camera	**Now and Again**		Nash Bridges	
CBS	Winter	Kids Say the Darndest Things	Cosby	**Now and Again**		Nash Bridges	
CBS	Spring	Kids Say the Darndest Things	Cosby	**Now and Again**		Nash Bridges	
CBS	Summer	Kids Say the Darndest Things	Candid Camera	Special programming		Nash Bridges	
CBS	Mid-summer	**Big Brother**	Candid Camera	JAG (R)		Nash Bridges	
Fox	Fall	**Ryan Caulfield: Year One**		**Harsh Realm**		Local programming	
Fox	Mid-fall	Fox Movie Presentation				Local programming	
Fox	Winter	World's Wildest Police Videos		**Greed**		Local programming	
Fox	Spring	World's Wildest Police Videos		**Greed**		Local programming	
Fox	Summer	Beyond Belief: Fact or Fiction		**Greed**		Local programming	
Fox	Mid-summer	Beyond Belief: Fact or Fiction		Guinness World Records Primetime		Local programming	
NBC	Fall	Providence (23/9.4)		Dateline Friday (28/8.9) (Tied with **Malcolm in the Middle**)		**Cold Feet**	
NBC	Mid-fall	Providence (23/9.4)		Dateline Friday (28/8.9) (Tied with **Malcolm in the Middle**)		Law & Order (R)	
NBC	Winter	Providence (23/9.4)		Dateline Friday (28/8.9) (Tied with **Malcolm in the Middle**)		**Law & Order: Special Victims Unit**	
NBC	Spring	Providence (23/9.4)		Dateline Friday (28/8.9) (Tied with **Malcolm in the Middle**)		**Law & Order: Special Victims Unit**	
NBC	Summer	Providence (23/9.4)		Dateline Friday (28/8.9) (Tied with **Malcolm in the Middle**)		**Law & Order: Special Victims Unit**	
UPN	Fall	**Blockbuster Video Shockwave Cinema**				Local programming	
UPN	Winter	**Blockbuster Video Shockwave Cinema**				Local programming	
UPN	Spring	**Blockbuster Video Shockwave Cinema**				Local programming	
UPN	Summer	**The Strip**		**Secret Agent Man**		Local programming	
The WB	Fall	**Mission Hill**	The Jamie Foxx Show	The Steve Harvey Show	For Your Love	Local programming	
The WB	Mid-fall	The Jamie Foxx Show (R)	The Jamie Foxx Show	The Steve Harvey Show	For Your Love	Local programming	
The WB	Late fall	The Jamie Foxx Show	The Jamie Foxx Show (R)	The Steve Harvey Show	For Your Love	Local programming	
The WB	Winter	The Jamie Foxx Show	Various programming	The Steve Harvey Show	For Your Love	Local programming	
The WB	Mid-winter	The Jamie Foxx Show	The Jamie Foxx Show (R)	The Steve Harvey Show	For Your Love	Local programming	
The WB	Spring	The Jamie Foxx Show	The Steve Harvey Show (R)	The Steve Harvey Show	For Your Love	Local programming	
The WB	Summer	The Jamie Foxx Show	For Your Love	**Young Americans** (R)		Local programming	
The WB	Late summer	**Baby Blues**	**Baby Blues**	**Young Americans** (R)		Local programming	

== Saturday ==
Network		8:00 p.m.	8:30 p.m.	9:00 p.m.	9:30 p.m.	10:00 p.m.	10:30 p.m.
ABC	Fall	ABC Big Picture Show					
ABC	Mid-fall	**Who Wants to Be a Millionaire**		ABC Big Picture Show			
ABC	Late fall	ABC Big Picture Show					
ABC	Winter	ABC Big Picture Show					
ABC	Spring	ABC Big Picture Show					
ABC	Summer	ABC Big Picture Show				NYPD Blue (R)	
ABC	Mid-summer	ABC Big Picture Show				Special programming	
CBS	Fall	Early Edition		Martial Law		Walker, Texas Ranger	
CBS	Winter	**Winning Lines**	Candid Camera	Martial Law		Walker, Texas Ranger	
CBS	Mid-winter	Early Edition		Martial Law		Walker, Texas Ranger	
CBS	Spring	Early Edition		Martial Law		Walker, Texas Ranger	
CBS	Summer	48 Hours		Walker, Texas Ranger		**Falcone** (R)	
CBS	Mid-summer	**Big Brother**		Walker, Texas Ranger		Walker, Texas Ranger (R)	
Fox		COPS	COPS (R)	America's Most Wanted: America Fights Back		Local programming	
NBC	Fall	**Freaks and Geeks**		The Pretender		Profiler	
NBC	Winter	The Pretender		Profiler		World's Most Amazing Videos	
NBC	Spring	The Pretender		**The Others**		Profiler	
NBC	Summer	NBC Saturday Night At The Movies				**The Others**	
NBC	Mid-summer	NBC Saturday Night At The Movies				Profiler	
NBC	Late summer	NBC Saturday Night At The Movies				The Pretender	

== By network ==
=== ABC ===
Returning series

- 20/20
- The ABC Monday Night Movie
- ABC Big Picture Show
- America's Funniest Home Videos
- Boy Meets World
- Dharma & Greg
- The Drew Carey Show
- The Hughleys
- It's Like, You Know...
- Monday Night Football
- Norm (formerly known as The Norm Show)
- NYPD Blue
- The Practice
- Sabrina the Teenage Witch
- Spin City
- Sports Night
- Two Guys and a Girl (formerly known as Two Guys, a Girl and a Pizza Place)
- Whose Line Is It Anyway?
- The Wonderful World of Disney

New series

- **Clerks: The Animated Series** *
- **Making the Band** *
- **Odd Man Out**
- **Oh, Grow Up**
- **Once and Again**
- **Snoops**
- **Talk to Me** *
- **Then Came You** *
- **Wasteland**
- **Who Wants to Be a Millionaire**
- **Wonderland** *

Not returning from 1998–99:

- The Big Moment
- Brother's Keeper
- Cupid
- Fantasy Island
- Home Improvement
- The Secret Lives of Men
- Strange World
- Two of a Kind
- Vengeance Unlimited

=== CBS ===
Returning series

- 48 Hours
- 60 Minutes
- 60 Minutes II
- Becker
- Candid Camera
- CBS Sunday Movie
- Chicago Hope
- Cosby
- Diagnosis: Murder
- Early Edition
- Everybody Loves Raymond
- JAG
- Kids Say the Darndest Things
- The King of Queens
- Martial Law
- Nash Bridges
- Touched by an Angel
- Walker, Texas Ranger

New series

- **Big Brother**
- **City of Angels** *
- **Falcone** *
- **Family Law**
- **Grapevine** *
- **Judging Amy**
- **Ladies Man**
- **Love & Money**
- **Now and Again**
- **Survivor**
- **Winning Lines** *
- **Work with Me**

Not returning from 1998–99:

- The Brian Benben Show
- Buddy Faro
- L.A. Doctors
- Maggie Winters
- The Magnificent Seven
- The Nanny
- Payne
- Promised Land
- Sons of Thunder
- To Have & to Hold
- Turks
- Unsolved Mysteries

=== Fox ===
Returning series

- Ally McBeal
- America's Most Wanted: America Fights Back
- Beverly Hills, 90210
- Beyond Belief: Fact or Fiction
- Cops
- Family Guy
- Fox Night At The Movies
- Futurama
- Guinness World Records Primetime
- King of the Hill
- Party of Five
- The PJs
- That '70s Show
- The Simpsons
- The World's Funniest!
- World's Wildest Police Videos
- The X-Files

**New series**

- **Action**
- **Ally**
- **American High** *
- **Get Real**
- **Greed** *
- **Harsh Realm**
- **Malcolm in the Middle** *
- **Opposite Sex** *
- **Ryan Caulfield: Year One**
- **Time of Your Life**
- **Titus** *

Not returning from 1998–99:

- Brimstone
- Costello
- Fox Files
- Getting Personal
- Holding the Baby
- Living in Captivity
- Melrose Place
- Millennium

=== NBC ===
Returning series

- 3rd Rock from the Sun
- Dateline NBC
- ER
- Frasier
- Friends
- Jesse
- Just Shoot Me!
- Law & Order
- NBC Sunday Night Movie
- The Pretender
- Profiler
- Providence
- Suddenly Susan
- Veronica's Closet
- Will & Grace
- World's Most Amazing Videos

New series

- **Battery Park** *
- **Cold Feet**
- **Daddio** *
- **Freaks and Geeks**
- **God, the Devil and Bob** *
- **Law & Order: Special Victims Unit**
- **M.Y.O.B.** *
- **The Mike O'Malley Show**
- **Mysterious Ways** *
- **The Others** *
- **Sammy** *
- **Stark Raving Mad**
- **Third Watch**
- **Twenty-One** *
- **The West Wing**

Not returning from 1998–99:

- Caroline in the City
- Conrad Bloom
- Encore! Encore!
- Everything's Relative
- Homicide: Life on the Street
- LateLine
- Mad About You
- NewsRadio
- Trinity
- Wind on Water
- Working

=== UPN ===
Returning series

- Dilbert
- Malcolm & Eddie
- Moesha
- Seven Days
- Star Trek: Voyager
- UPN's Night at the Movies

New series

- **The Beat** *
- **Grown Ups**
- **I Dare You: The Ultimate Challenge** *
- **The Parkers**
- **Secret Agent Man** *
- **Shasta McNasty**
- **The Strip**
- **Blockbuster Video Shockwave Cinema**
- **WWF SmackDown**

Not returning from 1998–99:

- America's Greatest Pets
- Between Brothers
- Clueless
- DiResta
- Family Rules
- Guys Like Us
- Home Movies
- In The House
- Legacy
- Love Boat: The Next Wave
- Mercy Point
- Power Play
- Redhanded
- Reunited
- The Secret Diary of Desmond Pfeiffer

=== The WB ===
Returning series

- 7th Heaven
- Buffy the Vampire Slayer
- Charmed
- Dawson's Creek
- Felicity
- For Your Love
- The Jamie Foxx Show
- Movie Stars
- The Steve Harvey Show
- Zoe (formerly known as Zoe, Duncan, Jack and Jane)

New series

- **Angel**
- **Baby Blues** *
- **Brutally Normal** *
- **D.C.** *
- **Jack & Jill**
- **Mission Hill**
- **Popular**
- **Roswell**
- **Safe Harbor**
- **Young Americans** *

Not returning from 1998–99:

- The Army Show
- Hyperion Bay
- Katie Joplin
- The Parent 'Hood
- Rescue 77
- Sister, Sister
- Smart Guy
- Unhappily Ever After
- The Wayans Bros.

Note: The * indicates that the program was introduced in midseason.

== Renewals and cancellations ==
=== Renewals ===
==== ABC ====
- Dharma & Greg—Renewed for the 2000–2001 season.
- NYPD Blue—Renewed for the 2000–2001 season.
- Once and Again—Renewed for the 2000–2001 season.
- Spin City—Renewed for the 2000–2001 season.
- The Drew Carey Show—Renewed for the 2000–2001 season.
- The Norm Show—Renewed for the 2000–2001 season.
- The Practice—Renewed for the 2000–2001 season.
- Two Guys and a Girl—Renewed for the 2000–2001 season.

==== CBS ====
- Becker—Renewed for the 2000–2001 season.
- City of Angels—Renewed for the 2000–2001 season.
- Diagnosis: Murder—Renewed for the 2000–2001 season.
- Everybody Loves Raymond—Renewed for the 2000–2001 season.
- Family Law—Renewed for the 2000–2001 season.
- JAG—Renewed for the 2000–2001 season.
- Judging Amy—Renewed for the 2000–2001 season.
- The King of Queens—Renewed for the 2000–2001 season.
- Ladies Man—Renewed for the 2000–2001 season.
- Nash Bridges—Renewed for the 2000–2001 season.
- Touched by an Angel—Renewed for the 2000–2001 season.
- Walker, Texas Ranger—Renewed for the 2000–2001 season.

==== Fox ====
- Ally McBeal—Renewed for the 2000–2001 season.
- Family Guy—Renewed for the 2000–2001 season.
- Futurama—Renewed for the 2000–2001 season.
- King of the Hill—Renewed for the 2000–2001 season.
- Malcolm in the Middle—Renewed for the 2000–2001 season.
- That '70s Show—Renewed for the 2000–2001 season.
- The Simpsons—Renewed for the 2000–2001 season.
- Titus—Renewed for the 2000–2001 season.
- The X-Files—Renewed for the 2000–2001 season.

==== NBC ====
- 3rd Rock from the Sun—Renewed for the 2000–2001 season.
- Daddio—Renewed for the 2000–2001 season.
- ER—Renewed for the 2000–2001 season.
- Frasier—Renewed for the 2000–2001 season.
- Friends—Renewed for the 2000–2001 season.
- Just Shoot Me!—Renewed for the 2000–2001 season.
- Law & Order—Renewed for the 2000–2001 season.
- Law & Order: Special Victims Unit—Renewed for the 2000–2001 season.
- Providence—Renewed for the 2000–2001 season.
- Third Watch—Renewed for the 2000–2001 season.
- The West Wing—Renewed for the 2000–2001 season.
- Will & Grace—Renewed for the 2000–2001 season.

==== UPN ====
- Moesha—Renewed for the 2000–2001 season.
- The Parkers—Renewed for the 2000–2001 season.
- Seven Days—Renewed for the 2000–2001 season.
- Star Trek: Voyager—Renewed for the 2000–2001 season.

==== The WB ====
- 7th Heaven—Renewed for the 2000–2001 season.
- Angel—Renewed for the 2000–2001 season.
- Buffy the Vampire Slayer—Renewed for the 2000–2001 season.
- Charmed—Renewed for the 2000–2001 season.
- Dawson's Creek—Renewed for the 2000–2001 season.
- Felicity—Renewed for the 2000–2001 season.
- For Your Love—Renewed for the 2000–2001 season.
- Jack & Jill—Renewed for the 2000–2001 season.
- Popular—Renewed for the 2000–2001 season.
- Roswell—Renewed for the 2000–2001 season.
- The Jamie Foxx Show—Renewed for the 2000–2001 season.
- The Steve Harvey Show—Renewed for the 2000–2001 season.

=== Cancellations/series endings ===
==== ABC ====
- Boy Meets World—Ended after seven seasons.
- It's Like, You Know...—Canceled after two seasons.
- Odd Man Out—Canceled after one season.
- Oh, Grow Up—Canceled after one season.
- Sabrina the Teenage Witch—Moved to The WB for a fifth season.
- Snoops—Canceled after one season.
- Sports Night—Canceled after two seasons.
- Talk to Me—Canceled after one season.
- The Hughleys—Moved to UPN for a third season.
- Then Came You—Canceled after one season.
- Wasteland—Canceled after one season.
- Wonderland—Canceled after one season.

==== CBS ====
- Chicago Hope—Ended after six seasons.
- Cosby—Ended after four seasons.
- Early Edition—Ended after four seasons.
- Falcone—Canceled after 9 episodes.
- Grapevine—Canceled after one season.
- Kids Say the Darndest Things—Moved to ABC for the 2019-2020 season.
- Love & Money—Canceled after one season.
- Martial Law—Canceled after two seasons.
- Now and Again—Canceled after one season.
- Work with Me—Canceled after one season.

==== Fox ====
- Action—Canceled after one season.
- Beverly Hills, 90210—Ended after ten seasons.
- Get Real—Canceled after one season.
- Harsh Realm—Canceled after one season.
- Party of Five—Ended after six seasons.
- The PJs—Moved to The WB for a third season.
- Ryan Caulfield: Year One—Canceled after one season.
- Time of Your Life—Canceled after one season.

==== NBC ====
- Battery Park—Canceled after one season.
- Cold Feet—Canceled after one season.
- Freaks and Geeks—Canceled after one season.
- Jesse—Canceled after two seasons.
- The Mike O'Malley Show—Canceled after one season.
- M.Y.O.B.—Canceled after one season.
- The Others—Canceled after one season.
- The Pretender—Ended after four seasons.
- Profiler—Ended after four seasons.
- Stark Raving Mad—Canceled after one season.
- Suddenly Susan—Ended after four seasons.
- Veronica's Closet—Ended after three seasons.

==== UPN ====
- The Beat—Canceled after one season.
- Dilbert—Canceled after two seasons.
- Grown Ups—Canceled after one season.
- Malcolm & Eddie—Ended after four seasons.
- Secret Agent Man—Canceled after one season.
- Shasta McNasty—Canceled after one season.
- The Strip—Canceled after one season.

==== The WB ====
- Brutally Normal—Canceled after one season.
- D.C.—Canceled after one season.
- Movie Stars—Canceled after two seasons.
- Safe Harbor—Canceled after one season.
- Young Americans—Canceled after one season.
- Zoe—Canceled after two seasons.
