= The World's Funniest! =

- Genre: Reality television, comedy
- Written by: Richard Albrecht & Casey Keller
- Directed by: Brad Lachman
- Presented by: James Brown
- Narrated by: Mark Thompson
- Country of origin: United States
- Original language: English
- No. of seasons: 2

Production
- Executive producer: Brad Lachman
- Producers: Gary Bormet; James DuBose; Bill Bracken; MJ Gillhooley; Peter A. Steen; Timothy Stokes
- Camera setup: Videotape; Multi-camera (studio segments)
- Production company: Brad Lachman Productions

Original release
- Network: Fox
- Release: August 17, 1997 – 2000

The World's Funniest! is an American reality show that aired on Fox in 1997. Hosted by James Brown and announced by Mark Thompson, the show had a format similar to ABC's America's Funniest Home Videos. It featured funny clips from TV shows, bloopers, and humorous TV commercials. Unlike AFHV, there was no contest element, and viewer-submitted videos were not rewarded with prizes. The show was hosted without a studio audience, with laughter backing during clips provided via a laugh track.

The series aired on Fox until 2000 and was generally scheduled on Sunday nights at 7 PM ET, or after NFL football on the East Coast during the football season, allowing for easy joining in progress without much consequence to viewers.

The World's Funniest! was based on a series of specials on Fox titled Oops! The World's Funniest Outtakes. It is unrelated, outside of sharing a title and concept, to the later Fox series World's Funniest (formerly known as World's Funniest Fails), produced by Dick Clark Productions.

== Broadcast history ==
Season	Time slot
1997–1998	Sunday at 7:00-8:00 pm
1998–1999	Sunday at 7:00-7:30 pm (August 2 - October 25, 1998); Sunday at 7:00-8:00 pm (November 8, 1998 - June 13, 1999); Tuesday at 8:30-9:00 pm (December 22–29, 1998)
1999–2000	Sunday at 7:00-7:30 pm (June 6 - October 24, 1999); Friday at 8:00-9:00 pm (June 25 - August 27, 1999); Sunday at 7:00-7:30 pm (December 5, 1999 - January 30, 2000)
