= 1997–98 United States network television schedule =

Television schedule for the fall of 1997

The following is the 1997–98 network television schedule for the six major English language commercial broadcast networks in the United States. The schedule covers primetime hours from September 1997 through August 1998. The schedule is followed by a list per network of returning series, new series, and series cancelled after the 1996–97 season. All times are Eastern and Pacific, with certain exceptions, such as Monday Night Football.

New series highlighted in bold.

Each of the 30 highest-rated shows is listed with its rank and rating as determined by Nielsen Media Research. and

Yellow indicates the programs in the top 10 for the season.
Cyan indicates the programs in the top 20 for the season.
Magenta indicates the programs in the top 30 for the season.

Other Legend

- Light blue indicates local programming.
- Gray indicates encore programming.
- Blue-gray indicates news programming.
- Light green indicates sporting events.
- Light Purple indicates movies.
- Red indicates series being burned off and other regularly scheduled programs, including specials.

PBS is not included; member stations have local flexibility over most of their schedules and broadcast times for network shows may vary.

From February 7 to 22, 1998, all of CBS's primetime programming was preempted in favor of coverage of the 1998 Winter Olympics in Nagano.

For new series debuting during the season, it would ultimately prove to be one of the weakest seasons in American television history, as only ten shows would be picked up for a second season. Of those ten shows, only five (Dharma & Greg, Two Guys and a Girl, Ally McBeal, For Your Love and Dawson's Creek) would last beyond three seasons, and would all end their runs within six seasons.

For its tenth and final season, onetime CBS powerhouse Murphy Brown was moved from its lifelong home of Monday nights to Wednesday, where it lost a significant number of viewers. For its last block of episodes in the spring, the show was put back into the familiar timeslot that it had once used to anchor the CBS Monday night lineup.

== Sunday ==
Network		7:00 p.m.	7:30 p.m.	8:00 p.m.	8:30 p.m.	9:00 p.m.	9:30 p.m.	10:00 p.m.	10:30 p.m.
ABC	Fall	**The Wonderful World of Disney**				The ABC Sunday Night Movie			
ABC	Winter	**The Wonderful World of Disney**				The ABC Sunday Night Movie			
ABC	Spring	**The Wonderful World of Disney**				The ABC Sunday Night Movie			
ABC	Summer	**The Wonderful World of Disney**				ABC News programming		The Practice (R)	
CBS		60 Minutes (7/13.8)		Touched by an Angel (6/14.2)		CBS Sunday Movie (9/13.1)			
Fox	Fall	**The World's Funniest!**		The Simpsons (30/9.2) (Tied with Everybody Loves Raymond)	King of the Hill (23/9.7) (Tied with Mad About You)	The X-Files (19/10.6)		Local programming	
Fox	Winter	**The World's Funniest!**		The Simpsons (30/9.2) (Tied with Everybody Loves Raymond)	**Damon**	The X-Files (19/10.6)		Local programming	
Fox	Spring	**The World's Funniest!**		The Simpsons (30/9.2) (Tied with Everybody Loves Raymond)	King of the Hill (23/9.7) (Tied with Mad About You)	The X-Files (19/10.6)		Local programming	
Fox	Summer	**The World's Funniest!**		The Simpsons (30/9.2) (Tied with Everybody Loves Raymond)	King of the Hill (23/9.7) (Tied with Mad About You)	The X-Files (19/10.6)		Local programming	
NBC	Fall	Dateline Sunday		Men Behaving Badly	**Jenny**	NBC Sunday Night Movie (27/9.4)			
NBC	Winter	Dateline Sunday				NBC Sunday Night Movie (27/9.4)			
NBC	Spring	Dateline Sunday				NBC Sunday Night Movie (27/9.4)			
NBC	Summer	Dateline Sunday				Frasier (R)	**Working** (R)	Law & Order (R)	
NBC	Mid-summer	Dateline Sunday				NBC Sunday Night Movie (27/9.4)			
The WB	Fall	Nick Freno: Licensed Teacher	The Parent 'Hood	The Jamie Foxx Show	Unhappily Ever After	**The Tom Show**	**Alright Already**	Local programming	
The WB	Mid-fall	Nick Freno: Licensed Teacher	The Parent 'Hood	The Jamie Foxx Show	**The Tom Show**	Unhappily Ever After	**Alright Already**	Local programming	
The WB	Winter	Nick Freno: Licensed Teacher	**The Tom Show**	The Parent 'Hood	The Jamie Foxx Show	Unhappily Ever After	**Alright Already**	Local programming	
The WB	Spring	Nick Freno: Licensed Teacher	The Parent 'Hood	Sister, Sister (R)	The Jamie Foxx Show	Unhappily Ever After	**You're The One**	Local programming	
The WB	Mid-spring	The Parent 'Hood	**Kelly Kelly**	Sister, Sister (R)	The Jamie Foxx Show	Unhappily Ever After	**Alright Already**	Local programming	
The WB	Summer	Nick Freno: Licensed Teacher	The Parent 'Hood	Sister, Sister (R)	The Jamie Foxx Show	Unhappily Ever After	**Alright Already**	Local programming	
The WB	Mid-summer	The Parent 'Hood (R)	The Parent 'Hood	Sister, Sister (R)	Smart Guy (R)	Unhappily Ever After	The Steve Harvey Show (R)	Local programming	

== Monday ==
Network		8:00 p.m.	8:30 p.m.	9:00 p.m.	9:30 p.m.	10:00 p.m.	10:30 p.m.
ABC	Fall	**Timecop**		Monday Night Football (5/15.0)			
ABC	Mid-fall	Special programming		Monday Night Football (5/15.0)			
ABC	Winter	America's Funniest Home Videos		20/20 (21/10.0)		The Practice	
ABC	Spring	America's Funniest Home Videos		20/20 (21/10.0)		The Practice	
ABC	Summer	America's Funniest Home Videos		20/20 (21/10.0)		The Practice	
CBS	Fall	Cosby (25/9.5) (Tied with Dharma & Greg)	Everybody Loves Raymond (30/9.2) (Tied with The Simpsons)	Cybill	**George and Leo**	**Brooklyn South**	
CBS	Winter	Cosby (25/9.5) (Tied with Dharma & Greg)	Everybody Loves Raymond (30/9.2) (Tied with The Simpsons)	**George and Leo**	**Style & Substance**	**Brooklyn South**	
CBS	Late winter	Cosby (25/9.5) (Tied with Dharma & Greg)	Everybody Loves Raymond (30/9.2) (Tied with The Simpsons)	**The Closer**	**George and Leo**	**Brooklyn South**	
CBS	Spring	Cosby (25/9.5) (Tied with Dharma & Greg)	Everybody Loves Raymond (30/9.2) (Tied with The Simpsons)	**The Closer**	Murphy Brown	**Brooklyn South**	
CBS	Summer	Cosby (25/9.5) (Tied with Dharma & Greg)	Everybody Loves Raymond (30/9.2) (Tied with The Simpsons)	Cybill	**George and Leo**	**Michael Hayes**	
CBS	Mid-summer	Cosby (25/9.5) (Tied with Dharma & Greg)	Everybody Loves Raymond (30/9.2) (Tied with The Simpsons)	Everybody Loves Raymond (R)	Murphy Brown	48 Hours	
Fox	Fall	Melrose Place		**Ally McBeal**		Local programming	
Fox	Winter	Melrose Place		**Ally McBeal**		Local programming	
Fox	Spring	**Damon**	**Getting Personal**	**Ally McBeal**		Local programming	
Fox	Summer	Melrose Place		**Ally McBeal**		Local programming	
NBC	Fall	Suddenly Susan	Fired Up	Caroline in the City	The Naked Truth	Dateline Monday (14/11.4)	
NBC	Late fall	Suddenly Susan	**Jenny**	Caroline in the City	The Naked Truth	Dateline Monday (14/11.4)	
NBC	Winter	Suddenly Susan	Fired Up	Caroline in the City	The Naked Truth	Dateline Monday (14/11.4)	
NBC	Late winter	Suddenly Susan	**House Rules**	Caroline in the City	The Naked Truth	Dateline Monday (14/11.4)	
NBC	Spring	Suddenly Susan	**House Rules**	Caroline in the City	The Naked Truth	Dateline Monday (14/11.4)	
NBC	Mid-spring	Suddenly Susan	Suddenly Susan (R)	Caroline in the City	Caroline in the City (R)	Dateline Monday (14/11.4)	
NBC	Summer	Suddenly Susan	**House Rules**	Caroline in the City	Caroline in the City (R)	Dateline Monday (14/11.4)	
NBC	Mid-summer	Suddenly Susan	Caroline in the City (R)	Caroline in the City	**Veronica's Closet** (R)	Dateline Monday (14/11.4)	
NBC	Late summer	The NBC Monday Movie				Dateline Monday (14/11.4)	
UPN	Fall	In the House	Malcolm & Eddie	**Good News**	Sparks	Local programming	
UPN	Winter	In the House	Malcolm & Eddie	**Good News**	Sparks	Local programming	
UPN	Spring	**Love Boat: The Next Wave**		Special programming		Local programming	
UPN	Summer	**Love Boat: The Next Wave**		Clueless (R)	Clueless (R)	Local programming	
UPN	Mid-summer	In the House	Malcolm & Eddie	**Good News**	Sparks	Local programming	
The WB	Fall	7th Heaven		Buffy the Vampire Slayer		Local programming	
The WB	Winter	7th Heaven		**Three**		Local programming	
The WB	Spring	7th Heaven		7th Heaven (R)		Local programming	
The WB	Summer	7th Heaven		Buffy the Vampire Slayer		Local programming	

== Tuesday ==
Network		8:00 PM	8:30 PM	9:00 PM	9:30 PM	10:00 PM	10:30 PM
ABC	Fall	Home Improvement (R)	Soul Man	Home Improvement (10/12.0) (Tied with Frasier)	**Hiller and Diller** (28/9.3) (Tied with Walker, Texas Ranger)	NYPD Blue (17/10.8) (Tied with Primetime Live)	
ABC	Mid-fall	Soul Man	**Over the Top**	Home Improvement (10/12.0) (Tied with Frasier)	**Hiller and Diller** (28/9.3) (Tied with Walker, Texas Ranger)	NYPD Blue (17/10.8) (Tied with Primetime Live)	
ABC	Late fall	Grace Under Fire	Soul Man	Home Improvement (10/12.0) (Tied with Frasier)	Spin City (R)	NYPD Blue (17/10.8) (Tied with Primetime Live)	
ABC	Winter	The Drew Carey Show (R)	Soul Man	Home Improvement (10/12.0) (Tied with Frasier)	Grace Under Fire	NYPD Blue (17/10.8) (Tied with Primetime Live)	
ABC	Spring	Home Improvement (R)	Something So Right	Home Improvement (10/12.0) (Tied with Frasier)	**That's Life**	NYPD Blue (17/10.8) (Tied with Primetime Live)	
ABC	Mid-spring	Home Improvement (R)	Soul Man	Home Improvement (10/12.0) (Tied with Frasier)	Something So Right	NYPD Blue (17/10.8) (Tied with Primetime Live)	
ABC	Summer	Soul Man	Something So Right	Home Improvement (10/12.0) (Tied with Frasier)	**Two Guys, a Girl and a Pizza Place** (R)	NYPD Blue (17/10.8) (Tied with Primetime Live)	
ABC	Mid-summer	Home Improvement (10/12.0) (Tied with Frasier)	Soul Man	Spin City (R)	**Dharma & Greg** (R)	**Maximum Bob**	
CBS	Fall	JAG		**Michael Hayes**		**Dellaventura**	
CBS	Winter	JAG		CBS Tuesday Movie			
CBS	Late winter	JAG		**Public Eye with Bryant Gumbel**		**Four Corners**	
CBS	Spring	JAG		**Public Eye with Bryant Gumbel**		48 Hours	
CBS	Summer	JAG		CBS Tuesday Movie			
Fox	Fall	Fox Tuesday Night Movie				Local programming	
Fox	Winter	Fox Tuesday Night Movie				Local programming	
Fox	Spring	Fox Tuesday Night Movie				Local programming	
Fox	Summer	King of the Hill (R)	King of the Hill (R)	**Guinness World Records Primetime**		Local programming	
NBC	Fall	Mad About You (23/9.7) (Tied with King of the Hill)	NewsRadio	Frasier (10/12.0) (Tied with Home Improvement)	Just Shoot Me! (12/11.9)	Dateline NBC (13/11.5)	
NBC	Winter	Mad About You (23/9.7) (Tied with King of the Hill)	NewsRadio	Frasier (10/12.0) (Tied with Home Improvement)	Just Shoot Me! (12/11.9)	Dateline NBC (13/11.5)	
NBC	Spring	Mad About You (23/9.7) (Tied with King of the Hill)	**For Your Love**	Frasier (10/12.0) (Tied with Home Improvement)	**LateLine**	Dateline NBC (13/11.5)	
NBC	Summer	Mad About You (23/9.7) (Tied with King of the Hill)	NewsRadio	Frasier (10/12.0) (Tied with Home Improvement)	3rd Rock from the Sun (R)	Dateline NBC (13/11.5)	
NBC	Late summer	Mad About You (23/9.7) (Tied with King of the Hill)	Various programming	Frasier (10/12.0) (Tied with Home Improvement)	Just Shoot Me! (12/11.9)	Dateline NBC (13/11.5)	
UPN	Fall	Clueless	Moesha	**Hitz**	**Head Over Heels**	Local programming	
UPN	Mid-fall	Moesha	Clueless	Malcolm & Eddie	**Hitz**	Local programming	
UPN	Winter	Moesha	Clueless	Malcolm & Eddie	Clueless (R)	Local programming	
UPN	Spring	Moesha	Clueless	Malcolm & Eddie	In the House	Local programming	
UPN	Mid-spring	Moesha	Clueless	Malcolm & Eddie	**Good News**	Local programming	
UPN	Summer	Moesha	In the House	Malcolm & Eddie	**Good News**	Local programming	
UPN	Mid-summer	Moesha	Clueless	In the House	Clueless (R)	Local programming	
The WB	Winter (began Jan. 20th)	Buffy the Vampire Slayer		**Dawson's Creek**		Local programming	
The WB	Spring	Buffy the Vampire Slayer		**Dawson's Creek**		Local programming	
The WB	Summer	Buffy the Vampire Slayer		**Invasion America**	**Invasion America**	Local programming	
The WB	Mid-summer	Buffy the Vampire Slayer		**Dawson's Creek**		Local programming	

== Wednesday ==
Network		8:00 PM	8:30 PM	9:00 PM	9:30 PM	10:00 PM	10:30 PM
ABC	Fall	Spin City	**Dharma & Greg** (25/9.5) (Tied with Cosby)	The Drew Carey Show (15/11.1)	Ellen	Primetime Live (17/10.8) (Tied with NYPD Blue)	
ABC	Winter	Spin City	**Dharma & Greg** (25/9.5) (Tied with Cosby)	The Drew Carey Show (15/11.1)	Ellen	Primetime Live (17/10.8) (Tied with NYPD Blue)	
ABC	Spring	Spin City	**Dharma & Greg** (25/9.5) (Tied with Cosby)	The Drew Carey Show (15/11.1)	**Two Guys, a Girl and a Pizza Place**	Primetime Live (17/10.8) (Tied with NYPD Blue)	
ABC	Summer	Spin City	**Dharma & Greg** (25/9.5) (Tied with Cosby)	The Drew Carey Show (15/11.1)	Ellen	Primetime Live (17/10.8) (Tied with NYPD Blue)	
ABC	Late summer	Spin City	**Dharma & Greg** (25/9.5) (Tied with Cosby)	The Drew Carey Show (15/11.1)	**Whose Line Is It Anyway?**	Primetime Live (17/10.8) (Tied with NYPD Blue)	
CBS	Fall	The Nanny	Murphy Brown	**Public Eye with Bryant Gumbel**		Chicago Hope	
CBS	Winter	The Nanny	Murphy Brown	**Public Eye with Bryant Gumbel**		Chicago Hope	
CBS	Spring	The Nanny	Cybill	**Michael Hayes**		Chicago Hope	
CBS	Summer	The Nanny	**The Simple Life**	**Public Eye with Bryant Gumbel**		Chicago Hope	
CBS	Mid-summer	The Nanny	**Style & Substance**	**Public Eye with Bryant Gumbel**		Chicago Hope	
Fox	Fall	Beverly Hills, 90210		Party of Five		Local programming	
Fox	Winter	Beverly Hills, 90210		Party of Five		Local programming	
Fox	Spring	Beverly Hills, 90210		**Significant Others**		Local programming	
Fox	Mid-spring	Beverly Hills, 90210		Party of Five		Local programming	
Fox	Summer	**Fox Wednesday Night Movie**				Local programming	
NBC	Fall	**The Tony Danza Show**	**Built to Last**	3rd Rock from the Sun	**Working**	Law & Order (20/10.2)	
NBC	Mid-fall	Dateline NBC		3rd Rock from the Sun	**Working**	Law & Order (20/10.2)	
NBC	Late fall	3rd Rock from the Sun (R)	**The Tony Danza Show**	3rd Rock from the Sun	**Working**	Law & Order (20/10.2)	
NBC	Winter	3rd Rock from the Sun (R)	Seinfeld (R)	3rd Rock from the Sun	**Working**	Law & Order (20/10.2)	
NBC	Spring	NewsRadio	Seinfeld (R)	3rd Rock from the Sun	**Working**	Law & Order (20/10.2)	
NBC	Mid-spring	3rd Rock from the Sun (R)	NewsRadio	3rd Rock from the Sun	**Working**	Law & Order (20/10.2)	
NBC	Summer	The Pretender (R)		3rd Rock from the Sun	**Working**	Law & Order (20/10.2)	
NBC	Late summer	Dateline NBC		3rd Rock from the Sun	**Stressed Eric**	Law & Order (20/10.2)	
UPN	Fall	The Sentinel		Star Trek: Voyager		Local programming	
UPN	Late fall	Star Trek: Voyager		The Sentinel		Local programming	
UPN	Winter	Star Trek: Voyager		The Sentinel		Local programming	
UPN	Spring	The Sentinel		Star Trek: Voyager		Local programming	
UPN	Summer	The Sentinel		Star Trek: Voyager		Local programming	
The WB	Fall	Sister, Sister	Smart Guy	The Wayans Bros.	The Steve Harvey Show	Local programming	
The WB	Winter	Sister, Sister	Smart Guy	The Wayans Bros.	The Steve Harvey Show	Local programming	
The WB	Spring	Smart Guy	Sister, Sister	The Wayans Bros.	The Steve Harvey Show	Local programming	
The WB	Summer	Smart Guy	Smart Guy (R)	The Wayans Bros.	The Steve Harvey Show	Local programming	
The WB	Mid-summer	The Wayans Bros. (R)	The Jamie Foxx Show	The Wayans Bros.	The Steve Harvey Show	Local programming	

== Thursday ==
Network		8:00 p.m.	8:30 p.m.	9:00 p.m.	9:30 p.m.	10:00 p.m.	10:30 p.m.
ABC	Fall	**Nothing Sacred**		**Cracker**		20/20 Thursday	
ABC	Winter	**Prey**		The ABC Thursday Night Movie			
ABC	Spring	Various programming		The ABC Thursday Night Movie			
ABC	Summer	**C-16**		**Prey**		ABC News programming	
ABC	Mid-summer	Special programming		ABC News programming		Nightline in Primetime	
CBS		Promised Land		Diagnosis: Murder (22/9.8)		48 Hours	
Fox	Fall	Living Single	**Between Brothers**	**413 Hope St.**		Local programming	
Fox	Winter	Various programming	**Ask Harriet**	New York Undercover		Local programming	
Fox	Late winter	Various programming		New York Undercover		Local programming	
Fox	Spring	**World's Wildest Police Videos**		Special programming		Local programming	
Fox	Summer	**World's Wildest Police Videos**		New York Undercover		Local programming	
Fox	Mid-summer	**World's Wildest Police Videos**		**Fox Files**		Local programming	
NBC	Fall	Friends (4/16.1)	**Union Square** (8/13.6)	Seinfeld (1/21.7)	**Veronica's Closet** (3/16.6)	ER (2/20.4)	
NBC	Winter	Friends (4/16.1)	**Union Square** (8/13.6)	Seinfeld (1/21.7)	**Veronica's Closet** (3/16.6)	ER (2/20.4)	
NBC	Mid-winter	Friends (4/16.1)	Just Shoot Me! (12/11.9)	Seinfeld (1/21.7)	**Veronica's Closet** (3/16.6)	ER (2/20.4)	
NBC	Spring	Friends (4/16.1)	Just Shoot Me! (12/11.9)	Seinfeld (1/21.7)	**Veronica's Closet** (3/16.6)	ER (2/20.4)	
NBC	Summer	Friends (4/16.1)	**Veronica's Closet** (3/16.6)	Seinfeld (1/21.7)	Just Shoot Me! (12/11.9)	ER (2/20.4)	
NBC	Mid-summer	Friends (4/16.1)	Suddenly Susan (R)	Seinfeld (1/21.7)	Just Shoot Me! (12/11.9)	ER (2/20.4)	
NBC	Late summer	Friends (4/16.1)	Frasier (R)	Seinfeld (1/21.7)	Frasier (R)	ER (2/20.4)	

NOTE: On Fox, Rewind was supposed to air 8-8:30, but it was cancelled due to production troubles.

== Friday ==
Network		8:00 p.m.	8:30 p.m.	9:00 p.m.	9:30 p.m.	10:00 p.m.	10:30 p.m.
ABC	Fall	Sabrina the Teenage Witch	Boy Meets World	**You Wish**	**Teen Angel**	20/20 Friday (16/10.9)	
ABC	Winter	Sabrina the Teenage Witch (R)	Boy Meets World	Sabrina the Teenage Witch	**Teen Angel**	20/20 Friday (16/10.9)	
ABC	Mid-winter	Sabrina the Teenage Witch (R)	Boy Meets World	Sabrina the Teenage Witch	**Hiller and Diller** (28/9.3) (Tied with Walker, Texas Ranger)	20/20 Friday (16/10.9)	
ABC	Spring	Sabrina the Teenage Witch (R)	Boy Meets World	Sabrina the Teenage Witch	Boy Meets World (R)	20/20 Friday (16/10.9)	
ABC	Summer	Sabrina the Teenage Witch	**You Wish**	Boy Meets World	**Teen Angel**	20/20 Friday (16/10.9)	
CBS	Fall	Family Matters	**Meego**	**The Gregory Hines Show**	Step by Step	Nash Bridges	
CBS	Mid-fall	Special programming		Family Matters	Step by Step	Nash Bridges	
CBS	Winter	**Kids Say the Darndest Things**	**The Gregory Hines Show**	Family Matters	Step by Step	Nash Bridges	
CBS	Spring	**Kids Say the Darndest Things**	Candid Camera	Unsolved Mysteries		Nash Bridges	
CBS	Summer	**Kids Say the Darndest Things**	Candid Camera	Family Matters	Step by Step	Nash Bridges	
CBS	Mid-summer	**Kids Say the Darndest Things**	Candid Camera	Unsolved Mysteries		Nash Bridges	
Fox	Fall	**The Visitor**		Millennium		Local programming	
Fox	Winter	Beyond Belief: Fact or Fiction		Millennium		Local programming	
Fox	Spring	Beyond Belief: Fact or Fiction		Millennium		Local programming	
Fox	Summer	**Getting Personal**	**Getting Personal** (R)	Millennium		Local programming	
NBC	Fall	**Players**		Dateline Friday		Homicide: Life on the Street	
NBC	Winter	**Players**		Dateline Friday		Homicide: Life on the Street	
NBC	Spring	Special programming		Dateline Friday		Homicide: Life on the Street	
NBC	Early summer	Dateline Friday		NBA on NBC			
NBC	Summer	Dateline Friday		NBC Friday Night Movie			
NBC	Mid-summer	NBC Friday Night Movie				Dateline Friday	

== Saturday ==
Network		8:00 p.m.	8:30 p.m.	9:00 p.m.	9:30 p.m.	10:00 p.m.	10:30 p.m.
ABC	Fall	**C-16**		**Total Security**		The Practice	
ABC	Mid-fall	Special programming				The Practice	
ABC	Winter	**Nothing Sacred**		**Cracker**		**ABC News Saturday Night**	
ABC	Late winter	ABC Saturday Night Movie				**ABC News Saturday Night**	
ABC	Spring	**Timecop**		ABC Saturday Night Movie			
ABC	Summer	20/20		ABC Saturday Night Movie			
CBS	Fall	Dr. Quinn, Medicine Woman		Early Edition		Walker, Texas Ranger (28/9.3) (Tied with Hiller and Diller)	
CBS	Winter	**The Magnificent Seven**		Early Edition		Walker, Texas Ranger (28/9.3) (Tied with Hiller and Diller)	
CBS	Late winter	Dr. Quinn, Medicine Woman		**The Magnificent Seven**		Walker, Texas Ranger (28/9.3) (Tied with Hiller and Diller)	
CBS	Spring	Dr. Quinn, Medicine Woman		Early Edition		Walker, Texas Ranger (28/9.3) (Tied with Hiller and Diller)	
CBS	Summer	Early Edition		**The Magnificent Seven**		Walker, Texas Ranger (28/9.3) (Tied with Hiller and Diller)	
Fox		COPS	COPS (R)	America's Most Wanted: America Fights Back		Local programming	
NBC	Fall	The Pretender (R)		NBC Saturday Night At The Movies			
NBC	Mid-fall	The Pretender		**Sleepwalkers**		Profiler	
NBC	Late fall	Special programming		The Pretender		Profiler	
NBC	Winter	All Star TV Bloopers		The Pretender		Profiler	
NBC	Spring	NBC Saturday Night At The Movies				Profiler	
NBC	Summer	All Star TV Bloopers		NBC Saturday Night At The Movies			

== By network ==
=== ABC ===
Returning series

- 20/20
- ABC Saturday Night Movie
- The ABC Sunday Night Movie
- The ABC Thursday Night Movie
- America's Funniest Home Videos
- Boy Meets World
- The Drew Carey Show
- Ellen
- Grace Under Fire
- Home Improvement
- Monday Night Football
- NYPD Blue
- The Practice
- Primetime Live
- Sabrina the Teenage Witch
- Something So Right (moved from NBC)
- Soul Man
- Spin City

New series

- **ABC News Saturday Night**
- **C-16: FBI**
- **Cracker**
- **Dharma & Greg**
- **Hiller and Diller**
- **Maximum Bob** *
- **Nothing Sacred**
- **Over the Top**
- **Prey** *
- **Push** *
- **Teen Angel**
- **That's Life** *
- **Timecop**
- **Total Security**
- **Two Guys, a Girl and a Pizza Place** *
- **The Wonderful World of Disney**
- **You Wish**

Not returning from 1996–97:

- The ABC Monday Night Movie
- Arsenio
- Clueless (moved to UPN)
- Coach
- Common Law
- Dangerous Minds
- Family Matters (moved to CBS)
- Gun
- Hangin' with Mr. Cooper
- High Incident
- Leaving L.A.
- Life's Work
- Lois & Clark: The New Adventures of Superman
- Murder One
- Relativity
- Roseanne (revived and returned for 2017–18 for one season)
- Second Noah
- Spy Game
- Step by Step (moved to CBS)
- Townies
- Turning Point
- Vital Signs

=== CBS ===
Returning series

- 48 Hours
- 60 Minutes
- Candid Camera
- CBS Sunday Movie
- Chicago Hope
- Cosby
- Cybill
- Diagnosis Murder
- Dr. Quinn, Medicine Woman
- Early Edition
- Everybody Loves Raymond
- Family Matters (moved from ABC)
- JAG
- Murphy Brown
- The Nanny
- Nash Bridges
- Promised Land
- Step by Step (moved from ABC)
- Touched by an Angel
- Unsolved Mysteries (moved from NBC)
- Walker, Texas Ranger

New series

- **Brooklyn South**
- **The Closer** *
- **Dellaventura**
- **Four Corners** *
- **George and Leo**
- **The Gregory Hines Show**
- **Kids Say the Darndest Things** *
- **The Magnificent Seven** *
- **Meego**
- **Michael Hayes**
- **Public Eye with Bryant Gumbel**
- **The Simple Life** *
- **Style & Substance** *

Not returning from 1996–97:

- Almost Perfect
- Dave's World
- EZ Streets
- Ink
- Life... and Stuff
- Mr. & Mrs. Smith
- Moloney
- Orleans
- Pearl
- Public Morals
- Temporarily Yours
- Feds

=== Fox ===
Returning series

- America's Most Wanted: America Fights Back
- Beverly Hills, 90210
- Beyond Belief: Fact or Fiction
- Cops
- Fox Tuesday Night Movie
- King of the Hill
- Living Single
- Melrose Place
- Millennium
- New York Undercover
- Party of Five
- The Simpsons
- The X-Files

New series

- **413 Hope St.**
- **Ally McBeal**
- **Ask Harriet** *
- **Between Brothers**
- **Damon** *
- **Fox Files** *
- **Fox Wednesday Night Movie**
- **Getting Personal**
- **Significant Others** *
- **The Visitor**
- **The World's Funniest!**
- **World's Wildest Police Videos** *

Not returning from 1996–97:

- Big Deal
- Lawless
- Love and Marriage
- Lush Life
- Married... with Children
- Martin
- Ned and Stacey
- Pacific Palisades
- Party Girl
- Pauly
- Roar
- Sliders

=== NBC ===
Returning series

- 3rd Rock from the Sun
- Caroline in the City
- Dateline NBC
- ER
- Fired Up
- Frasier
- Friends
- Homicide: Life on the Street
- Just Shoot Me!
- Law & Order
- Mad About You
- Men Behaving Badly
- The Naked Truth
- NBC Saturday Night At The Movies
- NBC Sunday Night Movie
- NewsRadio
- The Pretender
- Profiler
- Seinfeld
- Suddenly Susan

New series

- **Built to Last**
- **For Your Love** *
- **House Rules** *
- **Jenny**
- **LateLine** *
- **Players**
- **Sleepwalkers**
- **Stressed Eric** *
- **The Tony Danza Show**
- **Union Square**
- **Veronica's Closet**
- **Working**

Not returning from 1996–97:

- Boston Common
- Chicago Sons
- Crisis Center
- Dark Skies
- The Jeff Foxworthy Show
- The John Larroquette Show
- Mr. Rhodes
- Prince Street
- The Single Guy
- Something So Right (moved to ABC)
- Unsolved Mysteries (moved to CBS)
- Wings

=== UPN ===
Returning series

- Clueless (moved from ABC)
- In the House
- Malcolm & Eddie
- Moesha
- The Sentinel
- Sparks
- Star Trek: Voyager

New series

- **Good News**
- **Head Over Heels**
- **Hitz**
- **Love Boat: The Next Wave** *

Not returning from 1996–97:

- The Burning Zone
- Goode Behavior
- Homeboys in Outer Space
- Social Studies

=== The WB ===
Returning series

- 7th Heaven
- Buffy the Vampire Slayer
- The Jamie Foxx Show
- Nick Freno: Licensed Teacher
- The Parent 'Hood
- Sister, Sister
- Smart Guy
- The Steve Harvey Show
- Unhappily Ever After
- The Wayans Bros.

New series

- **Alright Already**
- **Dawson's Creek** *
- **Invasion America** *
- **Kelly Kelly** *
- **Three** *
- **The Tom Show**
- **You're the One** *

Not returning from 1996–97:

- Brotherly Love
- Kirk
- Life with Roger
- Savannah

Note: The * indicates that the program was introduced in midseason.
