= Veronica's Closet =

American television sitcom

- Genre: Sitcom
- Created by: David Crane; Marta Kauffman
- Starring: Kirstie Alley; Dan Cortese; Daryl Mitchell; Wallace Langham; Kathy Najimy; Ron Silver; Lorri Bagley; Robert Prosky
- Theme music composer: Moby, Gabriel Jackson, Bobby Robinson (season 3)
- Opening theme: "She's Got Everything" performed by Jeffrey Osborne (seasons 1–2) "Bodyrock" by Moby (season 3)
- Composers: Michael Skloff; Giorgio Bertuccelli
- Country of origin: United States
- Original language: English
- No. of seasons: 3
- No. of episodes: 66

Production
- Executive producers: Kevin S. Bright; Marta Kauffman; David Crane; Rob Ulin; Amy Sherman-Palladino; Jeff Astrof; Mike Sikowitz; Michael Poryes
- Producer: Kirstie Alley
- Camera setup: Multi-camera
- Running time: 30 minutes
- Production companies: Bright/Kauffman/Crane Productions; Warner Bros. Television

Original release
- Network: NBC
- Release: September 25, 1997 – December 7, 2000

Related
- Friends (1994–2004)

Veronica's Closet is an American television sitcom created by David Crane and Marta Kauffman. It aired on NBC for three seasons, from September 25, 1997, to December 7, 2000. The series marked Kirstie Alley's return to the network in a starring role since Cheers concluded its eleven-season run in 1993.

Kirstie Alley starred as Veronica "Ronnie" Chase, the owner and head of the titular fictional lingerie company in New York City, which was derived from the real-life lingerie company, Victoria's Secret. Kathy Najimy, Dan Cortese, Wallace Langham, Darryl Mitchell, Robert Prosky (season 1), Ron Silver (season 2), and Lorri Bagley (season 3) co-starred.

The show was a top 10 success during its first two seasons (ranking No. 3 in its first year and No. 5 in its second), airing between Seinfeld and ER within the 'Must See TV' lineup. Ratings dropped when NBC moved it to a new timeslot, resulting in the show being cancelled after three seasons on the air. During its run, it aired a total of 66 episodes (22 per season). The show was never released on physical media; it eventually received a digital release and began appearing on streaming services in the mid-2020's, with all episodes remastered in HD.

== Overview ==
Veronica "Ronnie" Chase, played by Alley, has made a living being known as the "Queen of Romance". She is the owner of Veronica's Closet, a company that sells lingerie and other bedroom accessories. Her husband Bryce (Christopher McDonald), regularly cheats on her, though she always takes him back because of the image she has created. However, after another tryst, Veronica decides to leave him and begins her life as a single woman.

She is championed by her best friend and Chief Financial Officer Olive Massery (Kathy Najimy), and her father Pat Chase (Robert Prosky), who is also her chauffeur. She works with Perry Rollins (Dan Cortese), a former thong model who is her publicist; her assistant Josh Blair (Wallace Langham); and Leo Michaels (Darryl Mitchell). Later in the first season, she gets a silent partner in Millicent (Holland Taylor), but when Millicent dies, the company is taken over by her incompetent son.

During the second season, Millicent's ex-husband Alec Bilson (Ron Silver) takes the company from his former stepson and helps the company regain some financial ground. However, he and Ronnie get close romantically as the season progresses. He dies between seasons two and three and is revealed to have married someone else. His widow, June Bilson (Lorri Bagley), is a stereotypical dumb blonde who has some secret intelligence. She remodels the entire office and refuses to give up her share of the company until Olive buys her out in the series finale.

== Cast ==
=== Main ===
- Kirstie Alley as Veronica "Ronnie" Chase
- Dan Cortese as Laird "Perry" Rollins, former underwear model and publicist
- Wallace Langham as Josh Nicolé Blair, Veronica's assistant, whose sexual identity is unclear
- Daryl Mitchell as Leo Michaels, Veronica's harried marketing manager
- Kathy Najimy as Olive Massery
- Robert Prosky as Pat Chase (season 1)
- Ron Silver as Alec Bilson, Veronica's business partner and rival (season 2)
- Lorri Bagley as June Bilson Anderson, Alec's wife and Veronica's partner (season 3)

=== Recurring ===
- Mary Lynn Rajskub as Chloe (15 episodes)
- Cynthia Mann as Virginia/Receptionist (15 episodes)
- Christopher McDonald as Bryce Anderson (9 episodes), Ronnie's ex-husband
- Ever Carradine as Pepper (8 episodes)
- Tamala Jones as Tina (8 episodes)
- Alan F. Smith as Brian (7 episodes)
- David Starzyk as Pete (5 episodes)
- Lupe Ontiveros as Louisa (4 episodes)
- James Wilder as Hunter (3 episodes)
- Erica Shaffer as Waitress/Assistant (3 episodes)
- Mark Harelik as Paul Byrne (3 episodes)
- John Schneider as Tom (3 episodes)
- John Mariano as Chris (3 episodes)
- Holland Taylor as Millicent (2 episodes)
- Scott Baio as Kevin (2 episodes)

=== Guest stars ===
- Eric McCormack as Griffin
- Ted Danson as Nick Vanover
- Michael Jeter as Edwin Murloff
- Conan O'Brien as Himself
- Jay Leno as Himself
- Portia de Rossi as Carolyn
- Leeza Gibbons as Herself
- Ingo Rademacher as Reg
- Zooey Deschanel as Elena
- Tia Carrere as Kim
- Tom Arnold as Chris
- John Ritter as Tim
- RuPaul as Brett
- Anna Nicole Smith as Donna

== Production history, reception, and ratings ==
The show was taped at Warner Bros. Studios in Burbank, California, on soundstage 25.

The role of Bryce was originally played by Jamey Sheridan in an unaired pilot before the role was recast with Christopher McDonald. The producers had wanted McDonald to play Bryce but he could not accept the role at first because when they were filming the pilot, he was shooting Into Thin Air. The original pilot was then reshot when McDonald became available.

The series premiered on September 25, 1997, after Seinfeld, to 35 million viewers. Variety gave it a mixed review but said it had potential. Its title was derived from the real-life lingerie company, Victoria's Secret. They complained about it. Hammocked between Seinfeld and ER within the 'Must See TV' lineup, the show was a huge success, although the initial ratings died down a bit later in the first season. The New York Times said it "has the highest Nielsen ratings of any new show this season and critics are lining up to proclaim her show 'must-she TV'."

The sitcom spent the first two seasons as a top 10 hit (No. 3 in its first season, No. 5 in its second), airing on Thursdays at 9:30 (after Seinfeld in season 1 and after Frasier in season 2). NBC moved the show out of "Must See TV" to a new timeslot, following Suddenly Susan (another NBC sitcom centered around a professional single woman), on Mondays for the 1999–2000 season. Ratings fell more than 50 percent, and NBC put both shows on hiatus. The show returned on Tuesdays at 9:30 (after Will & Grace) with only a slight boost in ratings. It went on hiatus again, this time an extended one, in February 2000. A few episodes were burned off later that June, with the final four not airing at all on NBC. The network then canceled the series, along with Suddenly Susan, due to low ratings.

Reruns were shown on USA Network from 2000 to early 2003 and on TV Guide Network from 2011 to 2012. The final four episodes were also first shown on that network.

== Home Media ==
The show was never released on VHS, DVD, or any form of physical media; it eventually began appearing on streaming services in the mid-2020's and received a digital release for purchase on various platforms in late August 2026, with all episodes remastered in HD. Due to music licensing issues, Moby's song "Bodyrock", which originally played over the opening credits for Season 3, was removed and replaced by a slightly extended version of the original theme song - Jeffrey Osborne's "She's Got Everything", which remains in place and was used for the opening credits of Season 1 and, to a lesser extent, Season 2.

== Episodes ==
=== Series overview ===
Season	Episodes	Originally released	
Season	Episodes	First released	Last released
1	22	September 25, 1997	May 7, 1998
2	22	September 24, 1998	May 6, 1999
3	22	September 20, 1999	December 7, 2000

=== Season 1 (1997–98) ===
No. overall	No. in season	Title	Directed by	Written by	Original release date	Prod. code	Viewers (millions)
1	1	"Pilot"	James Burrows	David Crane & Marta Kauffman	September 25, 1997	475128	35.07
Ronnie must decide whether to leave her husband or stay with him "for the sake of the business."
2	2	"Veronica's Woman Friend"	Robert Berlinger	Rob Ulin & Sarah Dunn	October 2, 1997	466202	27.17
Ronnie and Olive try to be friends outside the office; Josh is horrified when everyone starts using Perry's made-up word.
3	3	"Veronica's Husband Won't Leave"	Robert Berlinger	David Crane & Marta Kauffman	October 9, 1997	466201	26.10
Ronnie is livid after Bryce pleads for her forgiveness on Entertainment Tonight.
4	4	"Veronica's Not Happy About the Book"	Alan Rafkin	Sarah Dunn	October 16, 1997	466205	26.18
Divorce proceedings take an ugly turn when Bryce threatens to write a tell-all book about Ronnie.
5	5	"Veronica's First Date"	Robert Berlinger	Eric Weinberg	October 30, 1997	466203	25.04
Josh is infatuated with a rodeo cowboy (Jeffrey Nordling) who is more interested in roping Ronnie.
6	6	"Veronica's Best Buddy"	Alan Rafkin	Alexa Junge	November 6, 1997	466206	25.63
Ronnie and Bryce battle for custody of their geriatric dog Buddy; Perry dates a pregnant model (Vanessa Angel).
7	7	"Veronica's a Doll"	Alan Rafkin	John Frink & Don Payne	November 13, 1997	466204	26.58
A toy company approaches Ronnie about making a Veronica Chase doll for its line of "female role models".
8	8	"Veronica's First Thanksgiving"	Lee Shallat Chemel	Doty Abrams	November 20, 1997	466207	26.67
Ronnie's plans for a "traditional" dinner are interrupted when Bryce's grandmother (Eileen Brennan) arrives.
9	9	"Veronica's Brotherly Love"	Robert Berlinger	John Frink & Don Payne	December 11, 1997	466210	24.57
Ronnie persuades Olive to set her up with her gorgeous brother (Eric McCormack), but discovers after one date that he is an egotist.
10	10	"Veronica's Christmas Song"	Lee Shallat Chemel	Sherry Bilsing & Ellen Plummer	December 18, 1997	466208	24.70
Olive sings a solo at the Lincoln Center Christmas show while Ronnie is given a less glamorous role; Bryce has ulterior motives for asking Josh to dinner.
11	11	"Veronica's Got a Secret"	Robert Berlinger	Eric Weinberg	January 8, 1998	466211	25.74
Olive's boyfriend (Marcus Flannagan) makes at pass at Ronnie.
12	12	"Veronica's Fun and Pirates Are Crazy"	Lee Shallat Chemel	Steve Joe & Greg Schaffer	January 15, 1998	466209	26.66
Bryce decides he wants to "work" at the office, but his antics only disrupt things for Ronnie, and cause her to wonder if the staff likes him more than her. Zooey Deschanel guest stars.
13	13	"Veronica's Night Alone"	Kevin S. Bright	Sherry Bilsing & Ellen Plummer	January 29, 1998	466214	26.55
Ronnie stirs up controversy, and jeopardizes a date with Kevin Costner, after writing about the joys of "romancing yourself"; Leo learns about Tina's past romances.
14	14	"Veronica's $600,000 Pop"	Robert Berlinger	Sarah Dunn	February 5, 1998	466213	25.44
A glitch in her divorce proceedings stymies Ronnie's plans to consummate her renewed relationship with an old flame (Ted Danson); Perry deals with his girlfriend's superstitions.
15	15	"Veronica's a Drag"	Robert Berlinger	Story by : Eric Weinberg; Teleplay by : Sherry Bilsing & Ellen Plummer	February 26, 1998	466215	24.68
Ronnie copes with a kleptomaniacal supermodel and sues a drag queen who has been mocking her on TV.
16	16	"Veronica's Divorce Papers"	Robert Berlinger	Charlotte Brown	March 5, 1998	466212	22.95
Olive and the staff do not trust Bryce when he asks Ronnie to be his friend once their divorce is final.
17	17	"Veronica's Blackout"	Robert Berlinger	John Frink & Don Payne	March 12, 1998	466216	20.67
Ronnie celebrates her divorce with a trip to Atlantic City and returns with a new husband (Michael Jeter).
18	18	"Veronica's Bridal Shower"	Robert Berlinger	Story by : Sherry Bilsing & Ellen Plummer; Teleplay by : Sarah Dunn	April 2, 1998	466217	19.74
Olive feels stripped of her pride when asked what her new man (Maxwell Caulfield) does for a living; Perry tries to bond with his new girlfriend's son (Michael Welch).
19	19	"Veronica's Man in a Suitcase"	Robert Berlinger	Story by : Steve Joe & Greg Schaffer; Teleplay by : Brian Boyle & Rich Fox	April 9, 1998	466218	22.39
Ronnie returns from the airport with a suitcase that she concludes belongs to the perfect man (Mark Derwin); Tina scores more than an autograph when she meets football star Keyshawn Johnson.
20	20	"Veronica's All-Nighter"	Robert Berlinger	Story by : Pang-Ni Landrum; Teleplay by : Brian Boyle & Rich Fox	April 16, 1998	466219	22.72
Leo learns that his fiancée kissed another man; the staff scrambles to produce a summer catalogue.
21	21	"Veronica's Mole"	Robert Berlinger	Story by : Sarah Dunn; Teleplay by : Steve Joe & Greg Schaffer	April 30, 1998	466220	23.54
In an effort to expand the company, Ronnie seeks help from a silent partner (Holland Taylor).
22	22	"Veronica's Silent Partner"	Robert Berlinger	Story by : Steve Joe & Greg Schaffer; Teleplay by : John Frink & Don Payne	May 7, 1998	466221	27.17
Ronnie's partner (Holland Taylor) takes a liking to Josh, who responds in shocking fashion. (This is Robert Prosky's final episode.)

=== Season 2 (1998–99) ===
No. overall	No. in season	Title	Directed by	Written by	Original release date	Prod. code	Viewers (millions)
23	1	"Veronica Gets Her Closet Back"	Kevin S. Bright	Amy Sherman-Palladino	September 24, 1998	467901	24.67
Hunter's stepfather (Ron Silver) arrives to check up on him—and he winds up charming the former boss, Ronnie.
24	2	"Veronica's a Partner Now"	Robert Berlinger	Eric Weinberg	October 1, 1998	467902	21.72
Anger and sexual tension rise between Ronnie and Alec as they try to share an office and run the company together.
25	3	"Veronica's Great Model Search"	Robert Berlinger	Josh Bycel & Jonathan Fener	October 8, 1998	467904	22.97
Ronnie searches for a fresh face to feature as the catalogue's cover girl; Josh ends up on the outs with an altar-bound chum (Scott Thompson).
26	4	"Veronica's Dog Day Afternoon"	Robert Berlinger	Sherry Bilsing & Ellen Plummer	October 15, 1998	467903	19.23
Olive and Perry share an awkward moment; Alec acts like a scared kitten around Ronnie's dog.
27	5	"Veronica's Crushed"	Michael Lembeck	Tom Spezialy & Alan Cross	October 29, 1998	467905	19.46
Ronnie finds Alec's chivalry attractive; Leo wants to be Perry's roommate.
28	6	"Veronica's on the Herb"	Shelley Jensen	Richard Goodman	November 5, 1998	467907	18.74
Olive and Ronnie grow disillusioned with the effects of a health herb, while Alec plots revenge against his ex (Tia Carrere) after Perry starts dating her.
29	7	"Veronica's Breast Efforts"	Amanda Bearse	Michael Poryes	November 12, 1998	467906	18.10
A woman sues the company over a defect caused by a sports bra; Olive gets down to business with the new intern (David Lascher).
30	8	"Veronica's Thanksgiving That Keeps on Giving"	Jeff Melman	Mark Kunerth	November 19, 1998	467908	19.24
Thanksgiving dinner is a family affair for Olive, who sets a place for her young beau and his attractive dad (Mark Harelik).
31	9	"Veronica's Cheating Partners"	Alan Rafkin	Story by : Mike Gandolfi; Teleplay by : Sherry Bilsing & Ellen Plummer	December 10, 1998	467909	20.92
Ronnie acts like a woman scorned when Alec entertains offers from another company; Leo and his girlfriend play a name game.
32	10	"Veronica's Secret Santa"	Shelley Jensen	Eric Weinberg	December 17, 1998	467911	20.23
Ronnie gets naughty with a nice department-store Santa, then cries out when she sees who is under the beard.
33	11	"Veronica's from Venus, Josh's Parents Are from Mars"	Alan Rafkin	Barry Vigon & Tom Walla	January 7, 1999	467910	21.24
Josh receives a birthday visit from his boisterous parents (Tyne Daly, John Bennett Perry); Leo and Perry find what they think is a dream apartment.
34	12	"Veronica's Desk Job"	Shelley Jensen	Alan Cross & Tom Spezialy	January 21, 1999	467912	20.14
After a tiff with Alec, Josh quits his job as executive assistant and goes to work for Perry.
35	13	"Veronica's Wedding Bell Blues"	Alan Rafkin	Michael Poryes	February 4, 1999	467914	20.07
Ronnie is horrified when her ex-husband Bryce invites her to his wedding. Anna Nicole Smith guest-stars.
36	14	"Veronica Plays House"	Joe Regalbuto	Josh Bycel & Jonathan Fener	February 11, 1999	467915	21.00
Ronnie persuades Alec that it is time to buy a townhouse—and that she should be his decorator; Josh has a girlfriend.
37	15	"Veronica's Favorite Year"	Shelley Jensen	Amy Sherman-Palladino & Mike Gandolfi	February 18, 1999	467913	22.34
An eccentric photographer (John Ritter) has trouble focusing on the project Ronnie hires him to shoot, leaving Alec furious.
38	16	"Veronica's Little Tribute"	Dana de Vally Piazza	Sherry Bilsing & Ellen Plummer	February 25, 1999	467916	19.89
Ronnie plans to present a "humorous" tribute during a dinner honoring Alec.
39	17	"Veronica Falls Hard"	Shelley Jensen	Seth Friedman	March 11, 1999	467919	17.82
An encounter with Alec takes Ronnie off her feet—literally; Josh meets Chloe's Irish family on St. Patrick's Day.
40	18	"Veronica's Big Date"	Michael Lembeck	Story by : Jason Firestein; Teleplay by : Alan Dybner & Helen Pai	March 25, 1999	467918	18.43
Josh gains a wealth of knowledge about his girlfriend (Mary Lynn Rajskub), while Ronnie and Alec try to keep their affair under wraps.
41	19	"Veronica's Big Homecoming"	Michael Lembeck	Eric Weinberg	April 1, 1999	467917	15.48
The staff heads for Kansas when they learn that Ronnie's hometown plans to name a street "Veronica Chase Boulevard".
42	20	"Veronica's Little Ruse"	Joe Regalbuto	Barry Vigon & Tom Walla	April 22, 1999	467920	14.54
Ronnie's charity-ball date sparks jealousy in Alec, who thinks their relationship should go back to business—and only business.
43	21	"Veronica's Night at the Theater"	Joe Regalbuto	Amy Sherman-Palladino	April 29, 1999	467921	16.82
Alec offers Justin (Greg Evigan) half of the company, because Justin has "won" Ronnie; Olive spots an ex in the cast of "Cabaret."
44	22	"Veronica Says Goodbye"	Shelley Jensen	Mike Gandolfi	May 6, 1999	467922	17.29
Ronnie agrees to a weekend away with Justin, and Alec abruptly announces that he is leaving the company.

=== Season 3 (1999–2000) ===
No. overall	No. in season	Title	Directed by	Written by	Original release date	Prod. code	Viewers (millions)
45	1	"Veronica's New Boss"	Alan Rafkin	Jeffrey Astrof & Mike Sikowitz	September 20, 1999	225601	8.32
Ronnie reels at the news that Alec has died in a bizarre volcano accident, but she really blows her top when she comes face-to-face with his widow (Lorri Bagley). Meanwhile, Josh has a surprise for the rest of the office.
46	2	"Veronica's June Swoon"	Shelley Jensen	Christopher Vane	September 27, 1999	225602	7.91
Veronica feuds with June. Also, Josh tries to be one of the guys on a golf outing with Chloe's father (Paul Gleason).
47	3	"Veronica's Construction Worker"	Paul Miller	Eric Weinberg	October 4, 1999	225603	6.04
Veronica's latest romantic interest (John Schneider) is June's father; Olive volunteers to read to a blind child.
48	4	"Veronica's Office: Bigger, Longer and Cuter"	Shelley Jensen	Allison Adler	October 11, 1999	225604	7.19
The office renovation is complete, and Ronnie thinks June is trying to trick her into choosing inferior accommodations. Also, a videotape from Leo's past comes back to haunt him.
49	5	"Veronica's New Cat"	Shelley Jensen	Story by : Jeffrey Astrof & Mike Sikowitz; Teleplay by : Eric Weinberg	October 18, 1999	225605	8.00
Ronnie turns especially catty when her birthday gift to Olive is not nearly as purr-fect as Josh's. Meanwhile, Perry and Leo go to extremes to see a different side of June.
50	6	"Veronica's Long Walk Home"	Alan Rafkin	Monica Piper	October 25, 1999	225606	8.31
Taking a page from the Rosie Ruiz training manual, Ronnie learns a long, hard lesson about shortcuts at a charity walkathon. Meanwhile, Josh and Chloe perform a dress rehearsal of their upcoming wedding.
51	7	"Veronica's Got All the Right Stuffing"	J.D. Lobue	Richard Goodman	November 22, 1999	225608	5.91
Ronnie's Thanksgiving bash becomes just that when she and June try to beat the stuffing out of each other; Josh cooks for Chloe's brothers; Perry gets a monkey off his back at the holiday parade.
52	8	"Veronica's Sliding Doors"	Shelley Jensen	Josh Bycel & Jonathan Fener	November 29, 1999	225607	8.22
A trip to Miami for Ronnie and her staff plays out in different scenarios, depending on which flight they board.
53	9	"Veronica's New Year"	Shelley Jensen	Story by : Monica Piper; Teleplay by : Jason Firestein	December 13, 1999	225610	7.17
Ronnie nearly loses her head getting ready for a New Year's Eve duet with Isaac Hayes; Leo puts his feelings for Lana (Alexia Robinson) in writing; Perry tries to catch up on some last-minute resolutions.
54	10	"Veronica's Perfect Man"	Shelley Jensen	Mark J. Kunerth	January 4, 2000	225609	9.98
Ronnie "smells" trouble with a sexy new suitor; Olive learns good things do not always come in small packages.
55	11	"Veronica's Record"	Paul Miller	Story by : Mark J. Kunerth; Teleplay by : Alan Dybner	January 11, 2000	225611	11.13
Veronica vies to set an unusual world record; Josh shrinks from confrontation with a hostile neighbor; Perry's senile grandfather grows alarmingly fond of Leo.
56	12	"Veronica's Tattooed Man"	Alan Rafkin	Tiffany Zehnal	January 18, 2000	225612	9.16
When Ronnie dates Olive's former beau, she is tormented by a constant reminder of their relationship; Josh defends Perry and Leo from the office bully (Greg Proops).
57	13	"Veronica's Candy Panties"	Dana DeVally Piazza	Eric Weinberg	January 25, 2000	225613	10.14
Stressed out about planning his wedding, Josh goes on an eating binge; Ronnie causes a Valentine's Day marketing massacre. Scott Baio guest stars.
58	14	"Veronica's New Bookshelves"	Shelley Jensen	Mark J. Kunerth	February 1, 2000	225614	9.45
Josh and Chloe both develop crushes on their wedding planner (Scott Baio); Ronnie enjoys a steamy reunion with June's hunky father.
59	15	"Veronica's Sleepover"	Shelley Jensen	Richard Goodman	June 6, 2000	225615	4.71
Ronnie nervously anticipates an overnight stay with Tom; Leo aspires to be the best man at Josh's wedding.
60	16	"Veronica's Girls' Night Out"	Joe Regalbuto	Josh Bycel & Jonathan Fener	June 13, 2000	225616	5.29
At Josh's bachelor party, his longstanding flirtation with best pal Brian (Alan Smith) goes a step further.
61	17	"Veronica Helps Josh Out"	Stuart Ross	Jeffrey Astrof & Mike Sikowitz	June 20, 2000	225617	5.39
On the eve of his wedding to Chloe, Josh finally confronts the issue of his latent homosexuality; Perry plots to seduce June.
62	18	"Veronica Sets Josh Up"	Joe Regalbuto	Alan Dybner & Jason Firestein	June 27, 2000	225618	4.74
As Josh faces his first official day out of the closet, Ronnie and Olive compete to find him a new beau.
63	19	"Veronica's Clips"	Wallace Langham	Tiffany Zehnal	December 4, 2000	225619	N/A
Olive's job offer from another company leads the gang to take a stroll down memory lane (shown in clips).
64	20	"Veronica Loses Her Olive Again"	Joe Regalbuto	Christopher Vane	December 5, 2000	225620	N/A
Ronnie begs Olive to come back to Veronica's Closet; Leo accidentally telephones a supermodel.
65	21	"Veronica's Doing the Nasty With Perry"	Sheldon Epps	Allison Adler	December 6, 2000	225621	N/A
The latest office romance is a surprise; Leo tries to teach Josh how to play basketball.
66	22	"Veronica Checks Out"	Dana DeVally Piazza	Eric Weinberg	December 7, 2000	225622	N/A
Ronnie and Perry encounter trouble in their new romance.

== Broadcast and ratings history ==
Season	TV season	Timeslot (ET)	Season premiere	Season finale	Rank	Viewers (in millions)
1	1997–1998	Thursdays @ 9:30/8:30 Central (NBC's Must See TV Thursdays)	September 25, 1997	May 9, 1998	#3	24.4
2	1998–1999	Thursdays @ 9:30/8:30 Central (NBC's Must See TV Thursdays)	September 24, 1998	May 6, 1999	#5	19.3
3	1999–2000	Mondays @ 8:30/7:30 Central; Tuesdays @ 9:30/8:30 Central; Tuesdays @ 8:30/7:30 Central	September 20, 1999	December 7, 2000	#86	7.97

Veronica's Closet : U.S. viewers per episode (millions)

Season	Episode number																					
Season	1	2	3	4	5	6	7	8	9	10	11	12	13	14	15	16	17	18	19	20	21	22
1	35.07	27.17	26.10	26.18	25.04	25.63	26.58	26.67	24.57	24.70	25.74	26.66	26.55	25.44	24.68	22.95	20.67	19.74	22.39	22.72	23.54	27.17
2	24.67	21.72	22.97	19.23	19.46	18.74	18.10	19.24	20.92	20.23	21.24	20.14	20.07	21.00	22.34	19.89	17.82	18.43	15.48	14.54	16.82	17.29
3	8.32	7.91	6.04	7.19	8.00	8.31	5.91	8.22	7.71	9.98	11.13	9.16	10.14	9.45	4.71	5.29	5.39	4.74	TBD	TBD	TBD	TBD

Audience measurement performed by Nielsen Media Research (Note: The viewership statistics in the graph and table are sourced from the citations in the season-specific tables above.)

== Accolades ==
The series received recognition from the Hollywood Foreign Press Association, the Academy of Television Arts & Sciences, and the Screen Actors Guild-American Federation of Television and Radio Arts among other associations.

Year	Association	Category	Nominee(s)	Result	Ref
1998	ALMA Awards	Outstanding Actress in a Comedy Series	Lupe Ontiveros	Won	
1998	American Comedy Awards	Funniest Female Performer in a TV Series (Leading Role) Network, Cable or Syndication	Kirstie Alley	Nominated	
1998	ASCAP Film and Television Music Awards	Top TV Series	Michael Skloff	Won	
1998	ASCAP Film and Television Music Awards	Top TV Series	Giorgio Bertuccelli	Won	
1998	ASCAP Film and Television Music Awards	Top TV Series	Michael Skloff	Won	
1998	ASCAP Film and Television Music Awards	Top TV Series	David Zippel	Won	
1998	Casting Society of America	Best Casting for a TV, Comedy Pilot	Leslie Litt; Barbara Miller	Nominated	
1998	Emmy Awards (Primetime)	Outstanding Lead Actress in a Comedy Series	Kirstie Alley	Nominated	
1998	Golden Globes	Best Performance by an Actress in a Television Series — Comedy or Musical	Kirstie Alley	Nominated	
1998	Kids' Choice Awards	Favorite Television Actress	Kirstie Alley	Nominated	
1998	Online Film & Television Association	Best New Comedy Series	Veronica's Closet	Nominated	
1998	Online Film & Television Association	Best Supporting Actress in a Series	Kathy Najimy	Won	
1998	Online Film & Television Association	Best Supporting Actress in a Comedy Series	Kathy Najimy	Won	
1998	Online Film & Television Association	Best Supporting Actor in a Comedy Series	Wallace Langham	Nominated	
1998	Online Film & Television Association	Best Episode of a Comedy Series (for episode "Veronica's First Thanksgiving")	Lee Shallat Chemel (directed by); Doty Abrams (written by)	Nominated	
1998	Online Film & Television Association	Best New Title Sequence in a Series	Gavin MacKillop	Nominated	
1998	Online Film & Television Association	Best New Theme Song in a Series	Giorgio Bertuccelli; Michael Skloff	Nominated	
1998	People's Choice Awards	Favorite New Television Comedy Series (tied with Dharma & Greg)	Veronica's Closet	Won	
1998	Screen Actors Guild Awards	Outstanding Performance by a Female Actor in a Comedy Series	Kirstie Alley	Nominated	
