= Mark Thompson (newscaster) =

American journalist

- Born: United States
- Occupations: Hosting, journalist

Mark Thompson is an American newscaster and a two-time Emmy award winner for writing, hosting and producing specials for the Fox Broadcasting Company stations.

== Career ==
=== Television news ===
Thompson reported on science and environmental issues for KRON-TV, then an NBC affiliate in San Francisco, before getting upped to the nightly weather anchor on the 5, 6 and 11:00 p.m. editions of NewsCenter 4, in addition to those duties.

Mark Thompson pioneered a segment called "Neighborhood Weather", where he would read letters from viewers who had requested a live remote broadcast from their neighborhood in the Bay Area. The segment became a popular and enduring franchise.

Thompson was the on-air nightly weather anchor, science, and even occasional lifestyle reporter for KTTV's Fox 11 News Los Angeles. When he started appearing on KCOP-TV Channel 13 (the Fox-owned sister station of KTTV), Thompson became known for dancing during the weather reports on KCOP-TV's 11 p.m. newscasts, which he originally did on a whim. However, when email reaction was so enormously positive, he kept it going, quickly gaining not only a local following but nationwide attention as well. He was featured on Jimmy Kimmel Live! on October 5, 2006, and on Brit Hume's program on Fox News Channel, among others. He left both stations as of June 3, 2011. He made no on-air announcements of his future plans as a weather anchor.

Thompson previously served as an on-air weather anchor and science/environmental reporter at KMGH-TV in Denver, Colorado, and also worked at WKBW-TV in Buffalo, New York.

=== Radio news and talk ===
Thompson hosted a daily radio show from 10 a.m. to noon on San Francisco talk station KGO until October 6, 2022. The show ended when the station abruptly changed its format. He was informed just before going on air, and during his opening monologue he was told to end the broadcast at about 10:16 a.m. that day.

He would promptly give a final station identification before abruptly ending his show. It was later moved to YouTube and thru podcast. The show concentrated on politics and pop culture and featured calls from listeners across the Bay Area and California. Thompson had originally done fill-in talk show hosting on KGO when he first worked in San Francisco as a news person. Thompson also regularly appears on The Tim Conway Jr. Show on KFI in Los Angeles.

Thompson and CNN Latino anchor Elizabeth Espinosa hosted an early afternoon weekday talk program from early 2014 to late 2015.

=== Television hosting and announcing ===
Thompson was a regular hosting live television shows of high drama and even life and death. He has hosted high-profile "event" shows like Celebrity Daredevils Live (Fox) with Dennis Rodman and Angie Everhart, all the Robbie Knievel jumps since 1990 (building to building in Las Vegas, over a portion of the Grand Canyon, and over an oncoming train).

Mark Thompson hosted a live Knievel jump during which the weather prevented the jump and Thompson was asked by the network to "fill" for the entire hour. Building drama about the dangerous weather conditions but without saying that Knievel would jump or would not jump, the show still registered a 25 share.

Thompson has been a regular New Year's Eve host for Fox Television as well. In these shows, he has presided over everything from building implosions to musical acts.

Thompson hosted the red carpet arrival show for the Emmy Awards on Fox Television (Sept. 2011). It was his second time hosting an Emmy red carpet show.

Thompson also hosted Hole in the Wall along with Brooke Burns for Fremantle Television. The show aired on Fox during 2008–2009.

Thompson hosted Guinness World Records Primetime on Fox for three seasons. He also hosted When Good Pets Go Bad and provided voiceover work for several Fox reality shows.

Thompson was the host of the weekly entertainment program That's So Hollywood, and was one of the primary fill-in hosts on Good Day L.A., Fox's highest rated Los Angeles morning show.

=== Producer ===
Thompson was formerly a creative partner in NEXT entertainment with Mike Fleiss. Together they were responsible for a number of successful specials for Fox, and Thompson was the first person to pitch The Bachelor to ABC, though he credits Fleiss with the idea itself.

=== Other work ===
Thompson is a frequent panelist on political and cultural issues on The Young Turks network, and fills in for host, Cenk Uygur. His regular weekly podcast, The Edge with Mark Thompson, featured conversations on politics, show business, and popular culture.

Thompson has been seen as a reporter, an anchorman, and even a moderator of presidential debates in feature films such as Set It Off, The Day After Tomorrow and The American President, and television shows such as 24 and Ghost Whisperer.

Thompson has been one of the leading voices in reality television, as his voiceovers were heard in the earliest days of reality TV and are still heard on shows such as American Idol, Paradise Hotel, Are You Smarter Than a 5th Grader?, The Simple Life and Don't Forget the Lyrics. He was also the announcer on former Fox game shows Greed and It's Your Chance of a Lifetime. Thompson is the vocalist for the So You Think You Can Dance television show theme song for all versions of the show worldwide, and he is also the announcer for the US version of the show.

== Personal life ==
A native of Washington, D.C., Thompson graduated from Colgate University. He also studied at Oxford University in the United Kingdom.

A regular on the charity and fundraising circuit, Thompson is an active supporter of many philanthropic enterprises with a concentration in the areas of veganism and advocacy for animals, education, and environmental charities.
