= Living in Captivity =

American sitcom

- Created by: Tom Palmer
- Starring: Matt Letscher
- Composer: Brian Tyler
- Country of origin: United States
- Original language: English
- No. of seasons: 1
- No. of episodes: 7 (1 unaired)

Production
- Running time: 30 minutes
- Production companies: Shukovsky English Entertainment; Dog Soup, Inc. 20th Century Fox Television

Original release
- Network: Fox
- Release: September 11 – October 16, 1998

Living in Captivity is an American sitcom that aired on Fox on Friday nights from September 11, 1998, to October 16, 1998.

== Premise ==
The series centered on the residents of the fictional gated community of Woodland Heights, California. Among those shown were Will Merrik, a Christian novelist, his Jewish attorney wife Becca, Carmine Santucci, an auto parts mogul, his wife Lisa, and Curtis Cooke, a disc jockey, and his pregnant wife Tamara. Gordon was the gay security guard.

== Cast ==
- Matt Letscher as Will Merrik
- Melinda McGraw as Becca Merrik
- Lenny Venito as Carmine Santucci
- Mia Cottet as Lisa Santucci
- Dondré Whitfield as Curtis Cooke
- Kira Arne as Tamara Cooke
- Terry Rhoads as Gordon

== Episodes ==
| No. | Title | Directed by | Written by | Original release date | Prod. code |
|---|---|---|---|---|---|
| 1 | "Guns and Lattes" | Philip Charles MacKenzie | Tom Palmer | September 11, 1998 | 1ACW-79 |
| 2 | "Sex and the Suburbs" | Philip Charles MacKenzie | Tom Palmer | September 18, 1998 | 1ACW01 |
| 3 | "The Unkindest Cut" | Philip Charles MacKenzie | Dan Cohen & F.J. Pratt | September 25, 1998 | 1ACW03 |
| 4 | "Safe and Sound" | Philip Charles MacKenzie | Ed Yeager | October 2, 1998 | 1ACW02 |
| 5 | "The Alba Wars" | Unknown | Unknown | October 9, 1998 | 1ACW04 |
| 6 | "Put on a Happy Face" | David Steinberg | Lisa Albert | October 16, 1998 | 1ACW05 |
| 7 | "Boogie Heights" | N/A | N/A | Unaired | 1ACW06 |
