= Reunited (American TV series) =

American sitcom

- Genre: Sitcom
- Created by: Mark Alton Brown; Dee LaDuke
- Starring: Julie Hagerty
- Composers: Jonathan Wolff; Rich Ragsdale
- Country of origin: United States
- Original language: English
- No. of seasons: 1
- No. of episodes: 7 (1 unaired)

Production
- Executive producers: Mark Alton Brown; Dee LaDuke
- Camera setup: Multi-camera
- Running time: 30 minutes
- Production company: Castle Rock Entertainment

Original release
- Network: UPN
- Release: October 27 – December 29, 1998

Reunited is an American sitcom that aired on UPN from October 27 until December 29, 1998.

== Premise ==
Nicki meets the daughter she gave up for adoption 20 years earlier.

== Cast ==
- Julie Hagerty as Nicki Beck
- Cliff Bemis as Gary Beck
- Kelly DeMartino as Joanne
- Renee Olstead as Ami Beck
- Jamie Marsh as Roy

== Episodes ==
No.	Title	Directed by	Written by	Original release date	Prod. code
1	"Pilot"	Robby Benson	Mark Alton Brown & Dee LaDuke	October 27, 1998	245200
Nicki meets the daughter she gave up for adoption 20 years earlier and finds out that they are complete opposites.
2	"Mommy, Mommy"	Asaad Kelada	Mark Alton Brown & Dee LaDuke	November 3, 1998	245201
Nicki and Joanne tries to catch up on what has been happening since Nicki gave Joanne up for adoption.
3	"The Mother Meets the Parents"	Asaad Kelada	Mark Alton Brown & Dee LaDuke	November 10, 1998	245202
Joanne's pretentious adoptive parents meet Nicki and Gary.
4	"Where Is Joanne Going (And When?)"	Sheldon Epps	David Silverman & Marcy Gray Rubin	November 17, 1998	245203
Gary wants Nicki to ask Joanne to leave.
5	"P.O.V."	Sheldon Epps	Bill Kenny	December 1, 1998	245204
Joanne reads Nicki's diary.
6	"Nicki Tells Her Parents (Off)"	Amanda Bearse	Mark Alton Brown & Dee LaDuke	December 29, 1998	245205
Nicki is still angry at her parents for sending her to a home for unwed mothers when she was pregnant with Joanne.
7	"Joanne Tells Her Parents (Off)"	Amanda Bearse	TBD	Unaired	245206
