= Four Corners (American TV series) =

- Created by: David Jacobs; Julie Sayres; Michael Filerman
- Starring: Ann-Margret; Sônia Braga; Raymond J. Barry; Justin Chambers; Megan Ward; Kamar de los Reyes; Tim Carhart; Douglas Wert
- Composer: Christopher Klatman
- Country of origin: United States
- Original language: English
- No. of seasons: 1
- No. of episodes: 5 (2 unaired)

Production
- Executive producers: David Jacobs; Michael Filerman; Alan Margulies; Joel Okmin
- Camera setup: Single-camera
- Running time: 60 minutes
- Production companies: Roundelay-MF; Ann Margret Productions; Rysher Entertainment; CBS Productions

Original release
- Network: CBS
- Release: February 24 – March 3, 1998

Four Corners is an American prime time television drama starring Ann-Margret, Sônia Braga, Raymond J. Barry, Justin Chambers, Megan Ward, Kamar de los Reyes, Tim Carhart and Douglas Wert that ran from February 24 to March 3, 1998, on CBS. It was created by David Jacobs, Julie Sayres and Michael Filerman and produced by Roundelary-MF, Ann Margret Productions, Rysher Entertainment and CBS Productions.

== Synopsis ==
Following the death of her husband in a plane crash, Amanda Wyatt (Ann-Margret) struggles to keep her sprawling Homestead Ranch out of the hands of property developers. Working against her is her devious son Alex (Douglas Wert) who wants to sell the land to developers and leave with her cash. Her friend Carlotta (Sônia Braga) is also fighting to keep the land out of the developers' hands as she represents the migrant workers of the area who depend on the land for their income. Other characters included Carlotta's son Tomas (Kamar de los Reyes) who had been in love with Amanda's flighty daughter Kate (Megan Ward) but had given her up for a life in the church but is now fighting his feelings for her; Sam (Raymond J. Barry), the ranch foreman and potential love interest for Amanda, caring school teacher Eva (Dahlia Waingort) and Caleb (Justin Chambers), the wayward son of Sam who has just been released from jail.

== Cast ==
- Ann-Margret as Amanda "Maggie" Wyatt
- Douglas Wert as Alex Wyatt
- Megan Ward as Kate Wyatt
- Sônia Braga as Carlotta Alvarez
- Kamar de los Reyes as Tomas Alvarez
- Dahlia Waingort as Eva Alvarez
- Raymond J. Barry as Sam Haskell
- Justin Chambers as Caleb Haskell
- Tim Carhart as Sheriff

== Production ==
The series was produced by Michael Filerman and David Jacobs, who both worked on Dallas, Knots Landing and Falcon Crest. The show went through a number of name changes before going on air with the series being called Ventanas, Santa Fe and Homestead before they settled on Four Corners. The show was supposed to be co-produced by Columbia TriStar Television, but CTT sold its interest in the show to Rysher Entertainment.

Location filming for the show took place in the San Gabriel Mountains in California. The first episode was shown as a two-hour movie on CBS in the 9.00-11.00 slot on Tuesday February 24, 1998, with the next episode shown in what was supposed to be its regular one-hour slot at 10.00 on March 3, 1998. It was the first drama on US network TV to be simulcast in both English and Spanish.

The show was one of the highly touted shows of the 1997–98 season but quickly became one of its biggest disasters as it was taken off air after only two episodes. It was subsequently rebroadcast on Lifetime Television as a two-part TV movie under the new title of Homestead, a title also used in other countries. It has been aired sporadically on UK digital TV channel CBS Drama since the channel launched in 2009.

== Episodes ==
No.	Title	Directed by	Written by	Original release date	Prod. code
1	"Betrayals"	Michael Fresco	David Jacobs	February 24, 1998	101
2	"Lives of Their Own"	Kevin Dowling; Ron Lagomarsino	David Jacobs; Julie Sayres	February 24, 1998	103
3	"The Fear That Follows"	Tim Hunter	Adam Fierro	March 3, 1998	104
4	"Thicker Than Water"	Tim Hunter	Clifton Campbell	Unaired	102
5	"Antonio"	Lee Bonner	Savannah Tucker	Unaired	105

== Awards and nominations ==
Christopher Klatman was nominated for an Emmy Award for Outstanding Main Title Theme Music in 1998 but lost to Fame L.A..
