= In the House =

In the House may refer to:

- In the House (film), a 2012 French film directed by François Ozon
- In the House (TV series), an American sitcom that ran 1995–1999
- In the House, a British TV sitcom featuring the girl group Cleopatra
- "In the House" (song), by Crowder, 2021
- "In the House", song performed by Scott Krippayne and Felicia Barton for 101 Dalmatian Street soundtrack
- In the House, 1985 album by Images in Vogue
