= Everything's Relative (1999 TV series) =

Television series

- Genre: Sitcom
- Created by: Mitchell Hurwitz
- Starring: Kevin Rahm; Jeffrey Tambor; Jill Clayburgh; Eric Schaeffer
- Composer: David Schwartz
- Country of origin: United States
- Original language: English
- No. of seasons: 1
- No. of episodes: 6 (2 unaired) (list of episodes)

Production
- Camera setup: Multi-camera
- Running time: 30 minutes
- Production companies: The Hurwitz Company; Witt/Thomas Productions; NBC Studios; Warner Bros. Television

Original release
- Network: NBC
- Release: April 6 – April 27, 1999

Everything's Relative is an American sitcom television series that aired on NBC from April 6, 1999 until April 27, 1999. The series was created by Mitchell Hurwitz, and was produced by Witt/Thomas Productions in association with Warner Bros. Television.

== Premise ==
This sitcom revolves around a young comedy writer and his family.

== Cast ==
- Kevin Rahm as Leo Gorelick
- Jeffrey Tambor as Jake Gorelick
- Eric Schaeffer as Marty Gorelick
- Jill Clayburgh as Mickey Gorelick
- Maureen
- Cassidy as Trina

== Episodes ==
No.	Title	Directed by	Written by	Original release date	Prod. code
1	"Where the Son Doesn't Shine"	John Fortenberry	Mitchell Hurwitz	April 6, 1999	001
Leo prepares for his brother's engagement party. Mom looks for a new apartment.
2	"Prisoner of Love"	John Fortenberry	Mitchell Hurwitz	April 13, 1999	002
Leo promises that he will stop lying.
3	"City of Flies"	John Fortenberry	Mitchell Hurwitz	April 20, 1999	003
Mickey tries to outdo Jake's gift to Leo.
4	"Just My Luck"	John Fortenberry	Mitchell Hurwitz	April 27, 1999	004
Leo tries to come up with a new catchphrase for his boss. Mickey tries to launch a career as a stand-up comedian.
5	"Night In the Tree"	James Burrows	John Fortenberry	Unaired	006
Treehouse vs. House.
6	"Halloween at Office"	Mitchell Hurwitz	John Fortenberry	Unaired	005
Trick or Treat.
