= Guinness World Records Primetime =

American television series

- Genre: Documentary Game show
- Presented by: Cris Collinsworth; Mark Thompson
- Country of origin: United States
- Original language: English
- No. of seasons: 3
- No. of episodes: 53

Production
- Production company: LMNO Productions

Original release
- Network: Fox
- Release: July 27, 1998 – October 4, 2001

Guinness World Records Primetime (AKA Guinness Primetime) is a TV show based on the Guinness World Records, and aired on the Fox television network from 1998 to 2001. It was hosted by Cris Collinsworth and Mark Thompson and reported on existing record-holders or on new record attempts. When the program featured profiles of existing Guinness World Record holders, it often combined in-studio segments with on-location reports.

These new record attempts included many unusual or bizarre categories such as a 300-pound tumor, squirting milk from one's eye, covering one's self with bees, sitting in a tub of snakes, regurgitating, burping, setting one's self on fire, eating metal, worms, and ketchup, kissing cobras, acting as a human speed bump, and entering a coffin full of cockroaches. Most of these attempts never found their way into the Guinness Book.

== See also ==
- Guinness World Records Gone Wild
