= 2001 in American television =

In American television in 2001, notable events included television series debuts, finales, cancellations, and channel initiations, closures and re-brandings, as well as information about controversies and disputes.

== Events ==
=== January ===
Date	Event
1	In Hartford, Connecticut, UPN affiliate WTXX (now CW affiliate WCCT-TV) and WB affiliate WBNE (now MyNetworkTV affiliate WCTX) change affiliations due to WTXX's impending purchase by Tribune Broadcasting, owners of Fox affiliate WTIC-TV (which at the time operated WTXX under a LMA) and a minority owner of The WB. WBNE, meanwhile, changes its call letters to the current WCTX and adopts a new branding known as "The X".
4	HBO's children's programs are transferred to its multiplex channel HBO Family.
7	Extreme Championship Wrestling's final nationally and globally televised event, Guilty as Charged airs on pay-per-view. It featured The Sandman defeating Steve Corino and Justin Credible for the world title, only for Rhyno to defeat The Sandman to win the title. Rob Van Dam initially challenged Rhyno for the title, but was attacked by Jerry Lynn. Despite interference and with help from Joel Gertner, he won the main event.
9	KXVA in Abilene, Texas, launches under Program Test Authority. The station (which would not be licensed for another 13 months) becomes the market's new Fox affiliation, moving from sister station KIDZ-LP, which becomes a full-time UPN affiliate.
28	CBS broadcasts Super Bowl XXXV, their first since Super Bowl XXVI at the end of the 1991 season. Greg Gumbel, becomes the first African-American sportscaster to provide network televised play-by-play on a major professional sports championship. The Baltimore Ravens would defeat the New York Giants 34–7.

=== February ===
Date	Event
5	Kelly Ripa joins Live! as a permanent co-host with Regis Philbin.
18	Fox broadcasts its inaugural NASCAR telecast, the Daytona 500. In the final lap, Dale Earnhardt is killed following a head-on collision.

=== March ===
Date	Event
6	TEENick first airs as a Sunday night block on Nickelodeon.
12	Judge Marilyn Milian makes her debut as arbitrator on The People's Court. Replacing Judge Jerry Sheindlin, Milian would become the longest-serving judge, presiding for 22 seasons until 2023, in the syndicated court show's history.
18	World Championship Wrestling produces their final pay-per-view, Greed.
26	On TNT, WCW Monday Nitro broadcasts its final show from Panama City Beach, Florida, with a simulcast with the WWF's (now WWE) Monday Night RAW television series (then airing on TNN), ending a six-year ratings struggle in professional wrestling known as the Monday Night War. Live professional wrestling events would not be broadcast on TNT again until the launch of AEW Dynamite in 2019.

=== April ===
Date	Event
1	WrestleMania X-Seven from the Reliant Astrodome in Houston, Texas, is broadcast on pay-per-view. The event would receive acclaim from critics and fans.
2	CBS affiliate WWJ-TV started airing newscasts, produced by UPN affiliate WKBD-TV. The newscast would become a failure and was canceled in November 2002.
10	Kevin Olmstead wins a $2.18 million jackpot on the ABC game show Who Wants to Be a Millionaire, making him the biggest winner in American game show history.

=== May ===
Date	Event
17	NBC airs the hour-long season seven finale of Friends titled "The One with Monica and Chandler's Wedding".
17	On The WB, Shannen Doherty makes her final appearance as Prue Halliwell on Charmed.
18	The 28th Daytime Emmy Awards are presented on NBC.
22	On The WB, Buffy the Vampire Slayer airs its 100th episode. It also served as The WB series finale after UPN announced that the series and Roswell would move to the network for the fall 2001 season.
23	On UPN, Star Trek: Voyager airs its series finale with a two-part episode "Endgame".

=== June ===
Date	Event
12	TNT is refocused as a drama-based cable channel with a new slogan, We Know Drama.
18	Luke and Laura, widely regarded as the soap opera pairing that helped generate the term "supercouple", sign divorce papers on ABC's soap opera General Hospital, dissolving their fictional two-decade union.
19	The inaugural BET Awards is broadcast.

=== July ===
Date	Event
21	Nickelodeon's animated series Rugrats celebrates its 10th anniversary with a one-hour special, All Growed Up, followed by the documentary Still Babies After All These Years, narrated by Amanda Bynes. The "All Growed Up" premiere became the most-viewed children's program on cable television, resulting in a spin-off series based on the special produced and premiered in 2003.
31	Fox Television Stations finalizes purchase of Chris-Craft Industries and its subsidiary BHC Communications. Shortly afterwards, ABC affiliate KTVX in Salt Lake City and NBC affiliate KMOL-TV in San Antonio was traded to Clear Channel in exchange for Fox station WFTC in Minneapolis/St. Paul, then-UPN station KPTV in Portland was traded to Meredith Corporation in exchange for Fox station WOFL in Orlando and UPN station KBHK-TV in San Francisco was traded to Viacom in exchange for the two Viacom-owned UPN stations KTXH in Houston and WDCA in Washington, D.C.

=== August ===
Date	Event
10	Samurai Jack premieres on Cartoon Network with The Premiere Movie, and becomes a successful series.
31	Mister Rogers' Neighborhood airs its final episode on PBS Kids. Fred Rogers died two years later of stomach cancer at the age of 74.

=== September ===
Date	Event
2	Adult Swim, an adult-oriented programming block, debuts on its Turner sister cable channel Cartoon Network.
3	Actress Thuy Trang, best known for her role as the yellow ranger, Trini Kwan from Mighty Morphin Power Rangers, dies in a car crash in San Francisco at age 27.
5	CBS's travel-based reality-competition, The Amazing Race, which would later become one of the most successful franchises in television, premieres its first episode.
7	Ed Toutant wins $1,860,000 on Who Wants to Be a Millionaire. He had previously appeared on the episode aired January 31, 2001, when the jackpot was $1,860,000, where he was ruled to have answered his $16,000 question incorrectly, but when it was discovered that there was a mistake in that question, Toutant returned to the program and wins the jackpot.
8	Fox broadcasts the final episode of Murder in Small Town X, in which New York City firefighter Ángel Juarbe Jr. wins. Juarbe is killed three days later during the collapse of the World Trade Center.
11	Viewers witness a terrorist attack, and the collapse of the World Trade Center in New York City live on television. Additionally, the broadcast towers of WABC-TV and WNBC, the respective flagship stations of ABC and NBC, are destroyed by the attacks, but those signals could be viewed cable and satellite. The broadcast tower of WCBS-TV is destroyed in the attacks, but its full-power backup transmitter at the Empire State Building remained. Most American over-the-air broadcasters and several cable networks suspend regular programming for four days, and numerous major daily talk shows were suspended for several weeks until their hosts feel comfortable resuming programming.
11	Although they were first seen during 1952 and used by some television news programs ever since, continually scrolling news headlines along the bottom of the screen become commonplace after the Fox News Channel uses it to allow viewers to read recent developments during the attacks.
13	UPN resumes normal programming with a live episode of SmackDown. The show was originally scheduled to be taped on September 11, but the taping was postponed by two days due to the attacks.
15	All of the Big Three television networks resume their normal daytime programming schedules after four days of extensive news coverage of the attacks.
16	Dick Schaap makes his final appearance as host of ESPN's The Sports Reporters. The show is expanded to an hour to cover the sports perspective from the September 11 attacks. Schaap delayed a hip replacement surgery in order to be on the program and dies from complications several months later.
20	On CBS, Will Kirby is declared the winner of Big Brother 2, which was delayed by the attacks. Runner-up Nicole Nilson-Schafrich wins $50,000.
21	All four major US networks, ABC, CBS, Fox, and NBC, broadcast America: A Tribute to Heroes, a two-hour telethon to raise money for the families of those killed by the attacks.
24	The start of the 2001–2002 network season in the US is delayed as a result of the attacks, with some series such as NBC's The West Wing substituting special episodes dealing with the event instead of their originally scheduled season premieres. Some series, such as CBS's military-themed series JAG and NBC's New York-based Third Watch, are reformatted in consideration of the attacks.
26	UPN airs the two-hour series premiere of Star Trek: Enterprise. Enterprise is UPN's replacement for Star Trek: Voyager.
29	Fox affiliate WVSX (now WVNS-TV) in Lewisburg, West Virginia, changes its affiliation to CBS, giving the Beckley-Bluefield-Oak Hill market its first full-time CBS affiliate. Fox would not return to the Bluefield area until 2006, when the combination of a dispute involving WVAH-TV in Charleston and the end of the Foxnet cable service prompts WVNS-TV to establish a Fox-affiliated DT2 subchannel.

=== October ===
Date	Event
2	The two-hour season 6 premiere of Buffy the Vampire Slayer first aired on UPN (attracting 7.7 million viewers), making it the first episode of Buffy to air on UPN following its move from The WB after the season 5 finale. The third-season premiere of Roswell (also from The WB) first aired on UPN a week later on October 9.
3	In the aftermath of the September 11 attacks, several planned series and events are canceled; most notably, NBC cancels a miniseries planned for spring 2002 which would have united the cast of Law & Order, Law & Order: Special Victims Unit and Law & Order: Criminal Intent, dealing with a terrorist attack on New York City.
3	The pilot episode for According to Jim is broadcast on ABC.
4	Rose McGowan makes her first appearance as Paige Matthews, the long-lost younger half-sister of Piper and Phoebe Halliwell, on The WB's Charmed.
15	In Wheel of Fortune, a compilation week of five taped sixth-episodes (which would later be called America's Game starting in season 26 in 2008) were shown for the first time. A new bonus round premiered a week later, in which a contestant can win as much as $100,000. This was not won until the December 19 episode by Douglas Ross.
20	Concert For New York: A Tribute To Heroes is broadcast by VH1, with performances by Paul McCartney, The Rolling Stones, The Who, Billy Joel and others. It raises funds for the families of those killed by the attacks.
24	The Walt Disney Company completes its purchase of Fox Family for $2.9 billion.
24	Wolf Lake aired its final episode on CBS due to low ratings. Four more episodes scheduled to broadcast were instead aired on UPN.
25	Sony Pictures Entertainment merged the television units of Columbia TriStar Television and Columbia TriStar Television Distribution into one unified division, Columbia TriStar Domestic Television, partly because of Japanese ownership, all of Sony's television employees had various amount of job losses in favor of Sony's new broadcasting/cable/syndication unit. Columbia TriStar Domestic Television would produce the Columbia TriStar programs for the 2001–2002 television season.

=== November ===
Date	Event
4	The 53rd Primetime Emmy Awards are presented on CBS. The original date was postponed two months earlier when the September 11 attacks occurred.
4	Game 7 of the World Series is broadcast on Fox. The Arizona Diamondbacks win their first title, defeating the three-time champion New York Yankees which marked the end of their dynasty. The game ended with a base hit walk-off by Luis Gonzalez against closer Mariano Rivera as he notoriously blew the save. This series was claimed as one of the greatest of all time.
15	The Victoria's Secret Fashion Show is broadcast on television for the first time. The 2001 edition of the show is broadcast on ABC with 12.4 million viewers tuning in.

=== December ===
Date	Event
13	On CBS, lawyers and best friends team, Rob Frisbee and Brennan Swain, won the inaugural season of The Amazing Race and the $1,000,000 grand prize.
21	Grandma Got Run Over by a Reindeer makes its network television premiere on The WB.
31	New Year's Eve Live airs its first edition on CNN.

== Programs ==
=== Debuts ===
Date	Show	Channel
January 1	Great Hotels	Travel Channel
January 3	Top 20 Countdown	CMT
January 6	How It's Made	Discovery Science
January 7	The Division	Lifetime
January 7	Lifestyle Magazine	TBN
January 7	Totally Hoops	Disney Channel
January 9	The Mole	ABC
January 9	Three Sisters	NBC
January 10	Grounded for Life	Fox
January 10	Temptation Island	Fox
January 12	Lizzie McGuire	Disney Channel
January 12	Popstars	The WB
January 12	Gary & Mike	UPN
January 13	Bob the Builder	Nickelodeon
January 13	House of Mouse	ABC
January 14	Taina	Nickelodeon
January 15	100 Centre Street	A&E
January 22	The Book of Pooh	Playhouse Disney
January 27	The Zeta Project	Kids' WB
January 30	On the Team	Noggin
February 3	Lloyd in Space	ABC
February 3	Power Rangers Time Force	Fox Kids
February 3	XFL	NBC/UPN
February 4	Kathy's So-Called Reality	MTV
February 24	Kate Brasher	CBS
February 27	The Andy Dick Show	MTV
February 28	Some of My Best Friends	CBS
March 1	Big Apple	CBS
March 4	The Lone Gunmen	Fox
March 5	BET.com Countdown	BET
March 6	The Fighting Fitzgeralds	NBC
March 11	Doc	PAX TV
March 12	The Chris Isaak Show	Showtime
March 14	The Job	ABC
March 19	First Years	NBC
March 26	Texas Justice	Syndication
March 27	What About Joan?	ABC
March 28	My Wife and Kids	ABC
March 28	Boot Camp	Fox
March 30	The Fairly OddParents	Nickelodeon
March 30	Invader Zim	Nickelodeon
April 1	The Oblongs	The WB
April 1	Undergrads	MTV
April 4	That's My Bush!	Comedy Central
April 6	Jerkbeast Show	SCAN-TV
April 10	Robotica	TLC
April 11	The Quarters	TVG Network
April 11	Special Unit 2	UPN
April 16	The Weakest Link	NBC
April 17	All Souls	UPN
April 17	Chains of Love	UPN
April 21	Weekend Now	The Weather Channel
April 22	Nero Wolfe	A&E
May 5	The Cost of Freedom	Fox News Channel
May 5	Dismissed	MTV
June 1	Unwrapped	Food Network
June 2	Braceface	Fox Family
June 2	So Little Time	Fox Family
June 3	Six Feet Under	HBO
June 3	Baby Looney Tunes	Kids' WB
June 5	Kristin	NBC
June 8	Time Squad	Cartoon Network
June 10	Tiny Planets	Noggin
June 11	Fear Factor	NBC
June 12	Witchblade	TNT
June 13	The Beast	ABC
June 18	Spyder Games	MTV
June 19	Go Fish	NBC
June 20	Primetime Glick	Comedy Central
June 20	You Don't Know Jack	ABC
June 21	WWE Tough Enough	MTV
June 21	Spy TV	NBC
June 25	State of Grace	Fox Family
June 26	Animal Precinct	Animal Planet
June 30	The Ripping Friends	Fox Kids
July 10	Cinema Insomnia	KXTV
July 12	Night Visions	Fox
July 18	Access Granted	BET
July 24	Murder in Small Town X	Fox
July 24	The Downer Channel	NBC
July 23	The Best Damn Sports Show Period	Fox Sports Net
July 29	Leap Years	Showtime
August 1	Hard Knocks	HBO
August 1	MythQuest	PBS
August 1	Out There TV	America One
August 3	Manhunt	UPN
August 4	All About Us	NBC
August 4	America's Test Kitchen	PBS
August 5	Insomniac with Dave Attell	Comedy Central
August 8	The Wayne Brady Show	ABC
August 9	Going to California	Showtime
August 10	Samurai Jack	Cartoon Network
August 11	Cubix: Robots for Everyone	Kids' WB
August 14	Dead Last	The WB
August 19	Let's Bowl	Comedy Central
August 20	Oswald	Nick Jr.
August 24	Grim & Evil	Cartoon Network
August 27	Shipmates	Syndication
August 31	The Nightmare Room	Kids' WB
September 1	The Legend of Tarzan	UPN
September 2	Anne of Green Gables: The Animated Series	PBS Kids
September 3	One on One	UPN
September 3	Sagwa, the Chinese Siamese Cat	PBS Kids
September 4	Lost	NBC
September 5	The Amazing Race	CBS
September 8	Moolah Beach	Fox Kids
September 9	Ponderosa	PAX TV
September 9	Ed McMahon's Next Big Star	PAX TV
September 9	Band of Brothers	HBO
September 10	The Ananda Lewis Show	Syndication
September 10	Iyanla	Syndication
September 10	The Other Half	Syndication
September 10	The URL With Phred Show	Noggin
September 12	American Morning	CNN
September 15	Alienators: Evolution Continues	Fox Kids
September 15	The Proud Family	Disney Channel
September 15	Stanley	Playhouse Disney
September 17	ElimiDate	Syndication
September 17	Rendez-View	Syndication
September 17	Talk or Walk	Syndication
September 19	Wolf Lake	CBS
September 22	What's with Andy?	Fox Family
September 23	The Education of Max Bickford	CBS
September 23	The Mind of the Married Man	HBO
September 24	Crossing Jordan	NBC
September 24	The Ellen Show	CBS
September 25	The Guardian	CBS
September 25	Philly	ABC
September 25	Undeclared	Fox
September 25	Emeril	NBC
September 25	Love Cruise	Fox
September 26	Star Trek: Enterprise	UPN
September 27	The Agency	CBS
September 27	Inside Schwartz	NBC
September 28	Thieves	ABC
September 28	Pasadena	Fox
September 29	The Mummy: The Animated Series	Kids' WB
September 29	Citizen Baines	CBS
September 30	Alias	ABC
September 30	Law & Order: Criminal Intent	NBC
September 30	UC: Undercover	NBC
September 30	War Stories with Oliver North	Fox News Channel
October 1	The 5th Wheel	Syndication
October 1	Tales from the Neverending Story	HBO
October 2	Scrubs	NBC
October 2	Bob Patterson	ABC
October 3	According to Jim	ABC
October 5	Maybe It's Me	The WB
October 5	Raising Dad	The WB
October 5	Reba	The WB
October 6	Mutant X	Syndication
October 6	Sk8	NBC
October 14	Degrassi: The Next Generation	Nickelodeon
October 14	Men, Women & Dogs	The WB
October 14	Off Centre	The WB
October 16	Smallville	The WB
October 20	Mary-Kate and Ashley in Action!	ABC
October 22	Pardon the Interruption	ESPN
October 22	Unscripted with Chris Connelly	ESPN
October 25	Truth or Scare	Discovery Kids
November 3	Totally Spies!	ABC Family
November 5	NewsNight with Aaron Brown	CNN
November 6	24	Fox
November 7	Beat the Geeks	Comedy Central
November 8	The Tick	Fox
November 14	The Bernie Mac Show	Fox
November 17	Justice League	Cartoon Network
November 17	30 Minute Meals	Food Network
November 17	Sara's Secrets	Food Network
November 19	The Popeye Show	Cartoon Network
November 25	Action League Now!	Nickelodeon
December 2	Project Greenlight	HBO
December 16	Iron Chef USA	UPN
December 31	CNN New Year's Eve Live	CNN

=== Returning this year ===
Show	Last aired	Previous network	New network	Returning
Space Ghost Coast to Coast	1999	Cartoon Network	Cartoon Network/Adult Swim	May 7/September 2
Unsolved Mysteries	1999	CBS	Lifetime	July 11
Home Movies	1999	UPN	Adult Swim	September 2
Aqua Teen Hunger Force	2000	Cartoon Network	Adult Swim	September 2
The Brak Show	2000	Cartoon Network	Adult Swim	September 2
Harvey Birdman, Attorney at Law	2000	Cartoon Network	Adult Swim	September 2
Sealab 2021	2000	Cartoon Network	Adult Swim	September 2
Card Sharks	1989	CBS	Syndication	September 17
Dexter's Laboratory	1999	Cartoon Network	Cartoon Network	November 16

=== Ending this year ===
Date	Show	Network	Debut	Status
January 6	Croc Files	Discovery Kids on NBC	1999	Cancelled
January 6	One World	NBC	1998	Cancelled
January 13	Buzz Lightyear of Star Command	ABC	2000	Cancelled
January 14	The Jamie Foxx Show	The WB	1996	Cancelled
January 17	Welcome to New York	CBS	2000	Cancelled
January 18	Later	NBC	1988	Cancelled
January 26	Level 9	UPN	2000	Cancelled
February 6	Beggars and Choosers	Showtime	1999	Cancelled
February 18	Grosse Pointe	The WB	2000	Cancelled
February 18	Hype	The WB	2000	Cancelled
February 24	Corduroy	PBS Kids	2000	Cancelled
March 1	Madeline	Disney Channel	1993	Cancelled
March 4	La Femme Nikita	USA Network	1997	Cancelled
March 5	Big Guy and Rusty the Boy Robot	Fox Kids	1999	Cancelled
March 5	Cleopatra 2525	Syndication	2000	Cancelled
March 7	Bette	CBS	2000	Cancelled
March 11	The Bob Clampett Show	Cartoon Network	2000	Cancelled
March 11	Strip Mall	Comedy Central	2000	Cancelled
March 21	WCW Thunder	TBS	1998	Cancelled
March 23	Generation O!	Kids' WB	2000	Cancelled
March 23	Oh Yeah! Cartoons	Nickelodeon	1998	Cancelled
March 24	Cover Me	USA	2000	Cancelled
March 25	In a Heartbeat	Disney Channel	2000	Cancelled
March 26	WCW Monday Nitro	TNT	1995	Cancelled
March 30	Hollywood Showdown	GSN	2000	Cancelled
March 31	Spider-Man Unlimited	Fox Kids	1999	Cancelled
March 31	WCW Worldwide	Syndication	1975	Ended
April 1	Kathy's So-Called Reality	MTV	2001	Cancelled
April 6	The Norm Show	ABC	1999	Cancelled
April 6	Teletubbies	PBS Kids	1998	Cancelled
April 9	Gideon's Crossing	ABC	2000	Cancelled
April 11	Some of My Best Friends	CBS	2001	Cancelled
April 13	Gary & Mike	UPN	2001	Cancelled
April 14	Kate Brasher	CBS	2001	Cancelled
April 15	Totally Hoops	Disney Channel	2001	Cancelled
April 15	Jack & Jill	The WB	1999	Cancelled
April 22	The Lot	AMC	1999	Cancelled
May 4	Nash Bridges	CBS	1996	Cancelled
May 11	Diagnosis: Murder	CBS	1993	Cancelled
May 14	Baywatch (returning in 2027)	Syndication	1989	Cancelled
May 14	Moesha	UPN	1996	Cancelled
May 15	The Fighting Fitzgeralds	NBC	2001	Cancelled
May 16	Two Guys and a Girl	ABC	1998	Cancelled
May 17	All That (returned in 2002)	Nickelodeon	1994	Cancelled
May 19	Cousin Skeeter	Nickelodeon	1998	Cancelled
May 19	The Howard Stern Radio Show	Syndication	1998	Cancelled
May 19	Walker, Texas Ranger	CBS	1993	Ended
May 22	3rd Rock from the Sun	NBC	1996	Ended
May 23	Boot Camp	Fox	2001	Cancelled
May 23	That's My Bush!	Comedy Central	2001	Cancelled
May 23	Star Trek: Voyager	UPN	1995	Cancelled
May 23	Moral Court	Syndication	2000	Cancelled
May 27	Mike, Lu & Og	Cartoon Network	1999	Cancelled
May 29	DAG	NBC	2000	Cancelled
June 1	Seven Days	UPN	1998	Cancelled
June 1	The Lone Gunmen	Fox	2001	Cancelled
June 6	18 Wheels of Justice	TNN	2000	Cancelled
June 7	Zoboomafoo	PBS	1999	Cancelled
June 18	Xena: Warrior Princess	Syndication	1995	Cancelled
June 22	FreakyLinks	Fox	2000	Cancelled
June 22	History IQ	The History Channel	2000	Cancelled
June 22	The Famous Jett Jackson	Disney Channel	1998	Cancelled
June 27	Ladies Man	CBS	1999	Cancelled
June 30	Men in Black: The Series	Kids' WB	1997	Cancelled
June 30	MasterChef USA	PBS	2000	Cancelled
July 10	The Geena Davis Show	ABC	2000	Cancelled
July 17	The Big Garage	TLC	1997	Cancelled
July 25	The Beast	ABC	2001	Cancelled
August 12	Undergrads	MTV	2001	Cancelled
August 12	Jackass	MTV	2000	Cancelled
August 18	WWF LiveWire	TNN	1996	Cancelled
August 19	WWF Superstars of Wrestling	USA Network	1986	Cancelled
August 28	Cursed	NBC	2000	Cancelled
August 31	The Big Help	Nickelodeon	1994	Cancelled
August 31	Mister Rogers' Neighborhood	PBS	1968	Ended
August 31	The Queen Latifah Show (returned in 2013)	Syndication	1999	Cancelled
September 1	Murder in Small Town X	Fox	2001	Cancelled
September 7	Real TV	Syndication	1996	Cancelled
September 7	Judge Mills Lane	Syndication	1998	Cancelled
September 9	Phred on Your Head Show	Noggin	1999	Cancelled
September 20	Spyder Games	MTV	2001	Cancelled
September 25	Dead Last	The WB	2001	Cancelled
September 28	So Weird	Disney Channel	1999	Cancelled
October 1	Internet Tonight	ZDTV/TechTV	1998	Cancelled
October 7	Monster Rancher	Syndication	1999	Cancelled
October 9	What About Joan?	ABC	2001	Cancelled
October 15	Bug Juice (returned in 2018)	Disney Channel	1998	Cancelled
October 19	Inquizition	GSN	1998	Cancelled
November 1	Bob Patterson	ABC	2001	Cancelled
November 3	Citizen Baines	CBS	2001	Cancelled
November 5	Recess	ABC	1997	Cancelled
November 10	All About Us	NBC	2001	Cancelled
November 17	MythQuest	PBS	2001	Cancelled
November 22	Maisy	Noggin	1999	Cancelled
November 30	ReBoot	ABC	1994	Cancelled
December 7	Johnny Bravo (returned in 2004)	Cartoon Network	1997	Cancelled
December 10	Angela Anaconda	Fox Family	1999	Cancelled
December 15	City Guys	NBC	1997	Cancelled
December 18	Batman Beyond	Kids' WB	1999	Cancelled
December 28	2 Minute Drill	ESPN	2000	Cancelled
December 28	Timothy Goes to School	PBS Kids	2000	Cancelled
December 30	Men, Women & Dogs	The WB	2001	Cancelled

=== Entering syndication this year ===
Show	Seasons	In Production	Source
Buffy the Vampire Slayer	September 17, 2001 - August 26, 2005	Yes	
City Guys	September 10, 2001 - September 8, 2002	No	
Everybody Loves Raymond	September 24, 2001 - September 10, 2016	Yes	
Just Shoot Me!	September 17, 2001 - August 28, 2015	Yes	
King of the Hill	September 10, 2001 - January 2, 2020	Yes	
The Practice	September 16, 2001 - March 31, 2006	Yes	
The Steve Harvey Show	September 17, 2001 - December 31, 2026	Yes	
Two Guys and a Girl	September 24, 2001 - August 28, 2005	No	

=== Changes of network affiliation ===
Show	Moved from	Moved to
American High	Fox	PBS
The Outer Limits	Showtime	Sci-Fi Channel
Candid Camera	CBS	PAX TV
Unsolved Mysteries	CBS	Lifetime
Card Sharks	CBS	Syndication
The Weekenders	ABC	UPN
Buffy the Vampire Slayer	The WB	UPN
Roswell	The WB	UPN
Jay Jay the Jet Plane	TLC	PBS Kids
National Geographic Explorer	CNBC	MSNBC
Home Movies	UPN	Adult Swim
The Brak Show	Cartoon Network	Adult Swim
Harvey Birdman, Attorney at Law	Cartoon Network	Adult Swim
Aqua Teen Hunger Force	Cartoon Network	Adult Swim
Sealab 2021	Cartoon Network	Adult Swim
Space Ghost Coast to Coast	Cartoon Network	Adult Swim

=== Notable TV movies ===
Premiere date	Title	Channel
March 24	Wit	HBO
April 28	61*	HBO
April 29	On Golden Pond	CBS
May 19	Conspiracy	HBO
July 21	All Growed Up	Nickelodeon
July 30	The Retrievers	Animal Planet
September 14	The Poof Point	Disney Channel
October 12	Halloweentown II: Kalabar's Revenge	Disney Channel
November 3	The Flintstones: On the Rocks	Cartoon Network
November 18	The Facts of Life Reunion	ABC
December 2	The Lost Battalion	A&E
December 7	12 Tiny Christmas Tales	Cartoon Network
December 7	'Twas the Night	Disney Channel
December 11	A Rugrats Kwanzaa	Nickelodeon

== Networks and services ==
=== Launches ===
Network	Type	Launch date	Notes	Source
Telefe Internacional	Cable and satellite	Unknown		
WE: Women's Entertainment	Cable and satellite	January 1		
National Geographic Channel	Cable and satellite	January 7		
C-SPAN 3	Cable television	January 22		
Showtime Family Zone; Showtime Next; Showtime Women	Cable television	March		
5StarMax; OuterMax; WMax @Max	Cable television	May 17		
CNBC World	Cable and satellite	July 1		
Lifetime Real Women	Cable and satellite	August 20		
HDNet	Cable and satellite	September 6		
New Tang Dynasty Television	Cable television	December 3		

=== Conversions and rebrandings ===
Old network name	New network name	Type	Conversion Date	Notes	Source
BET Movies: Starz!	Black Starz!	Cable and satellite	Unknown		
Discovery Kids Channel	Discovery Kids	Cable and satellite	Unknown		
The Movie Channel 2	TMC Xtra	Cable and satellite	March 5		
Showtime 3	Showcase	Cable and satellite	July 1		
Odyssey Network	Hallmark Channel	Cable and satellite	August 6	Having acquired the Jim Henson Company's interest in the Odyssey cable network the previous year, Crown Media Holdings rebrands Odyssey as the Hallmark Channel, after Crown Media's corporate parent Hallmark Cards. The Hallmark Channel branding continues to this day.	
MTV S	MTV en Espanol	Cable and satellite	October 1		
GEMS Television	Mun2	Cable and satellite	November 1	Telemundo relaunches GEMS Television as Mun2, featuring English and Spanish language programming intended for a young Latino audience.	
Fox Family	ABC Family	Cable and satellite	November 10	Fox Family is renamed ABC Family, as News Corporation sells the channel to The Walt Disney Company.	

=== Closures ===
Network	Type	Closure date	Notes	Source
The Box	Over-the-air multicast	January 1	After being acquired by MTV Networks, The Box, a request video music channel shuts down, replaced by MTV2 on terrestrial stations.	

== Television stations ==
=== Station launches ===
Date	Station	City of license / Market	Channel	Affiliation	Source
January 1	KUTH	Logan, UT	12	Univision	
January 2	KBBJ (Note: Satellite of KTVH in Helena.)	Havre–Great Falls, MT	9	NBC	
January 2	KDTP	Phoenix, AZ (Note: Now licensed to Holbrook, Arizona.)	11	Daystar	
January 3	KBAO	Lewistown, MT	13	NBC	
January 5	KXGR (Note: Semi-satellite of KTVW in Phoenix.)	Green Valley, AZ	46	Pax TV	
January 6	KSCC	Hutchinson–Wichita, KS	36	UPN	
January 9	KXVA	Abilene, TX	15	Fox	
January 12	KPHZ	Holbrook–Phoenix, AZ	39	America's Collectibles Network	
January 17	WWSI	Mount Laurel, NJ–Philadelphia, PA	62	Telemundo	
January 20	KPWB-TV	Ames–Des Moines, IA	23	The WB/UPN	
January 26	KWBM	Harrison, AR–Springfield, MO	31	The WB	
February 9	KUPT	Lubbock, TX	22	UPN	
February 21	KCWY	Casper, WY	13	Pax TV	
March 23	KBKI	Walla Walla, WA	9	Independent	
March 30	KBEO	Jackson, WY	11	America One	
March 31	KTMW	Salt Lake City, UT	20	Religious independent	
April	KPTF-TV	Farwell, TX	18	God's Learning Channel	
April 1	KPMR	Santa Barbara, CA	38	Telemundo	
May	KKAP	Little Rock, AR	36	Daystar	
May 14	KUPB	Midland–Odessa, TX	18	Univision	
June 18	WKDH	Houston–Tupelo–Columbus, MS	45	ABC	
June 20	KBGF	Douglas, AZ	3	Independent	
June 26	KPID-LP	Pocatello–Idaho Falls, ID	34	UPN	
July 9	KAZA	Avalon–Los Angeles, CA	54	Azteca America	
September 2	WBPG-TV	Mobile, AL	55	The WB	
October 15	KBLN	Grants Pass, OR	30	3ABN	
October 17	K22GA	Charlotte Amalie, USVI	22	Daystar	
October 19	WSKY-TV	Manteo, NC–Norfolk–Newport News, VA	4	Independent	
November 19	K07XG (Note: Translator of KTGM in Tamuning, Guam.)	Garapan, Saipan, MP	7	ABC	
December 3	KBPD	La Grande, OR	16	Univision	
Unknown	WBIF	Marianna–Panama City, FL	51	Pax TV	
Unknown	WBIH	Montgomery, AL	29	—N/a	
Unknown	KPXK	Odessa–Midland, TX	30	Pax TV	
Unknown	WACW-LP	Raleigh, NC	—N/a	America One	
Unknown	WTPX-TV	Wausau–Rhinelander, WI	46	Pax TV	

=== Network affiliation changes ===
Date	Station	City of license / Market	Channel	Old affiliation	New affiliation	Source
January 1	WVBG-LP	Albany, NY	25	UPN	Resort Sports Network	
January 1	WCCT-TV	Hartford, CT	20	UPN	The WB	
January 1	WCTX	Hartford, CT	59	The WB	UPN	
January 9	KIDZ-LP	Abilene, TX	54	Fox / UPN	UPN / Pax TV	
January 22	K11TW	North Platte, NE	11	UPN	Fox	
March 21	WNKY	Bowling Green, KY	40	Fox (as WKNT)	NBC	
September 29	WVNS-TV	Lewisburg–Beckley–Oak Hill, WV	59	Fox	CBS	
October 20	WAWA-LP	Syracuse, NY	14	Independent	UPN	
Unknown	W07CL	Fort Wayne, IN	7	Network One	AIN/UATV	

== Births ==
Date	Name	Notability
January 3	Ellis Ann Jackson	Actress (Talia in the Kitchen)
January 14	Cora Jade	Pro wrestler (WWE)
January 14	Jayce Mroz	Actor (I Am Frankie)
January 18	Claire Engler	Actress (A.N.T. Farm)
January 19	Tyler Merna	Voice actor (Prince James on Sofia the First)
January 21	Jackson Brundage	Actor (One Tree Hill, See Dad Run, Harvey Beaks)
February 5	Connor Gibbs	Actor (Ghost Whisperer)
February 15	Haley Tju	Actress (Monsters vs. Aliens, Bella and the Bulldogs, The Loud House, Big Hero 6: The Series, Where's Waldo?, Amphibia)
February 16	Katherine Forrester	Canadian voice actress (Katie on PAW Patrol)
February 19	David Mazouz	Actor (Touch, Gotham)
February 21	Isabella Acres	Actress (Better Off Ted)
February 21	Amarr M. Wooten	Actor (Knight Squad)
February 23	Tommi Rose	Actress (I Am Frankie)
March 6	Milo Manheim	Actor
March 26	Ciara Riley Wilson	Actress
March 30	Uriel Baldesco	Filipino actress (I Am Frankie)
April 5	Robbie Tucker	Actor (The Young and the Restless, See Dad Run)
April 8	Kyla Rae Kowalewski	Voice actress (Anais on The Amazing World of Gumball)
April 20	Ian Alexander	Actor (The OA)
April 21	Maria Quezada	Actress (Talia in the Kitchen)
June 8	Owen Mason	Canadian voice actor (Ryder on PAW Patrol (2013–15))
June 9	Xolo Mariduena	Actor (Parenthood, Cobra Kai)
June 13	DeVore Ledridge	Actress (Bizaardvark)
June 27	Curtis Harris	Actor (The Haunted Hathaways)
July 8	Riele Downs	Canadian actress (Henry Danger, The Adventures of Kid Danger)
July 10	Isabela Moner	Actress (Dora and Friends: Into the City!, 100 Things to Do Before High School)
July 12	Niles Fitch	Actor (This Is Us)
July 31	Sean Kyer	Canadian actor (Odd Squad)
August 8	Bebe Wood	Actress (The New Normal, The Real O'Neals, Love, Victor)
August 13	Alyssa Jirrels	Actress (Mech-X4)
August 14	Ava Raine	Pro wrestler and daughter of Dwayne Johnson
August 16	Cole Jensen	Actor (Crash & Bernstein)
August 21	Dallas Liu	Actor (Legendary Dudas, PEN15)
August 30	Sean Ryan Fox	Actor (Henry Danger, The Adventures of Kid Danger)
September 3	Kaia Gerber	Actress (The Shards), model and daughter of Rande Gerber and Cindy Crawford
September 4	Tenzing Norgay Trainor	Actor (Liv and Maddie)
September 18	Luke Mullen	Actor (Andi Mack)
October 5	Dalila Bela	Canadian actress (Odd Squad, Ready Jet Go!, Anne)
October 12	Raymond Ochoa	Actor
October 13	Caleb McLaughlin	Actor (Stranger Things)
October 14	Rowan Blanchard	Actress (Girl Meets World, The Goldbergs)
October 17	Jake Beale	Actor
October 27	Teilor Grubbs	Actress (Hawaii Five-0)
October 30	Jaheem King Toombs	Actor (100 Things to Do Before High School)
November 5	Alex Hook	Canadian actress (I Am Frankie)
November 5	Roxanne Perez	Pro wrestler (ROH, WWE)
November 7	Sawyer Barth	Actor (The Kids Are Alright)
November 8	Julia Hart	Pro wrestler (AEW)
November 14	Chloe Lang	Actress (Stephanie on LazyTown (2013–14))
November 15	Sadie Stanley	Actress (Kim Possible)
November 23	Parker Queenan	Actor (Are You Afraid of the Dark?)
December 5	Diego Velazquez	Actor (The Thundermans, Zoe Valentine)
December 8	Kamran Lucas	Actor (Mech-X4)
December 8	Tylen Jacob Williams	Actor (Instant Mom)
December 14	Joshua Rush	Actor (Clarence, Star vs. the Forces of Evil, The Lion Guard, Andi Mack, Where's Waldo?)
December 28	Madison De La Garza	Actress (Desperate Housewives) and sister of Demi Lovato
December 28	Maitreyi Ramakrishnan	Actress (Never Have I Ever)
December 31	Alex Thorne	Canadian voice actor (PAW Patrol, PJ Masks)

== Deaths ==
Date	Name	Age	Notability
January 1	Ray Walston	86	American actor (My Favorite Martian)
January 6	Scott Marlowe	68	American film, stage and television actor
January 8	Don Brodie	96	American actor
January 18	Al Waxman	65	Canadian actor and director (Lt. Samuels on Cagney & Lacey)
January 21	Sandy Baron	64	American actor and comedian
January 22	Roy Brown	68	Clown and puppeteer
January 24	Dick Whittinghill	87	American actor
January 25	Sam Singer	88	American animator and producer
January 28	Sally Mansfield	77	American actress
February 7	Dale Evans	88	Singer, actress (The Roy Rogers Show) and wife of Roy Rogers
February 18	Dale Earnhardt	49	Race car driver
February 20	Bob Weiskopf	86	Writer (I Love Lucy)
February 27	Stan Margulies	80	Producer (Roots, The Thorn Birds)
March 8	Edward Winter	63	Actor (Colonel Flagg on M*A*S*H)
March 12	Morton Downey Jr.	68	Host of (The Morton Downey Jr. Show)
March 15	Ann Sothern	92	Actress (Private Secretary, My Mother the Car)
March 16	Norma MacMillan	79	Voice actor (Casper the Friendly Ghost, Gumby)
March 22	William Hanna	90	Co-founder (with Joseph Barbera) of famous Hanna-Barbera animation studio
April 15	Joey Ramone	49	Singer-songwriter (Ramones)
May 12	Perry Como	88	Singer, TV host (Perry Como's Kraft Music Hall)
May 19	Pat Falken Smith	75	Soap opera writer (Days of Our Lives)
May 22	Whitman Mayo	70	Actor (Grady Wilson on Sanford and Son)
May 23	Harry Townes	86	Actor (The Fugitive)
May 31	Arlene Francis	93	Actress and game show panelist (What's My Line?)
June 2	Imogene Coca	92	Actress and comedian (Your Show of Shows)
June 21	Carroll O'Connor	76	Actor (Archie Bunker on All in the Family and Chief Bill Gillespie on In the Heat of the Night)
August 3	Christopher Hewett	80	Actor (Mr. Belvedere)
August 4	Lorenzo Music	64	Writer and actor; co-creator of The Bob Newhart Show; voice actor (Carlton the doorman on Rhoda, Garfield the cat)
August 25	Aaliyah	22	Singer and actress
September 2	Troy Donahue	65	Actor (Hawaiian Eye, Surfside 6)
September 3	Thuy Trang	27	Actress (Mighty Morphin Power Rangers)
September 11	David Angell	55	Writer (Cheers, Frasier)
September 11	Barbara Olson	45	Commentator who worked for CNN and Fox News
October 15	Ralph Levy	80	Director (The Jack Benny Program, Petticoat Junction)
October 17	Jay Livingston	86	Songwriter (themes to Bonanza and Mister Ed)
November 29	George Harrison	58	Singer-songwriter (The Beatles)
November 29	John Mitchum	82	Actor
December 1	Johnny Stearns	85	Actor and producer (Mary Kay and Johnny, Tonight Starring Steve Allen)
December 13	Chuck Schuldiner	34	Singer, songwriter, guitarist (guest on Headbangers Ball)
December 20	Foster Brooks	89	Actor
December 22	Lance Loud	50	Member of the family documented in (An American Family)

== See also ==
- 2001 in the United States
- List of American films of 2001
