= 2000–01 United States network television schedule =

Television schedule for the fall of 2000

The 2000–01 network television schedule for the six major English language commercial broadcast networks in the United States covers primetime hours from September 2000 to August 2001. The schedule is followed by a list per network of returning series, new series, and series cancelled after the 1999–2000 season.

PBS is not included; member stations have local flexibility over most of their schedules and broadcast times for network shows may vary. Also not included are stations affiliated with Pax TV, as its schedule is composed mainly of syndicated reruns although it also carried a limited schedule of first-run programs.

Each of the 30 highest-rated shows released in May 2001 is listed with its rank and rating in parentheses (#rank / rating), as determined by Nielsen Media Research.

From September 15 to October 1, 2000, all of NBC's primetime programming was preempted in favor of coverage of the 2000 Summer Olympics in Sydney.

== Legend ==
- Light blue indicates local programming.
- Gray indicates encore programming.
- Blue-gray indicates news programming.
- Light green indicates sporting events.
- Red indicates series being burned off and other regularly scheduled programs, including specials and movies.
- highlight Yellow highlights indicates the top-10 most watched programs of the season.
- highlight Cyan highlights indicates numbers 11-20 most watched programs of the season.
- highlight Magenta highlights indicates numbers 21-30 most watched programs of the season.
- highlight Highlights indicates that it falls in multiple of the above categories.

== Schedule ==
- New series are highlighted in **bold**.
- Repeat airings or same-day rebroadcasts are indicated by **(R)**.
- All times are U.S. Eastern and Pacific Time (except for some live sports or events). Subtract one hour for Central, Mountain, Alaska and Hawaii–Aleutian times.
- All sporting events air live in all time zones in U.S. Eastern time, with local and/or late-night programming scheduled by affiliates after game completion.

== Sunday ==
| Network | | 7:00 p.m. | 7:30 p.m. | 8:00 p.m. | 8:30 p.m. | 9:00 p.m. | 9:30 p.m. | 10:00 p.m. | 10:30 p.m. |
|---|---|---|---|---|---|---|---|---|---|
| ABC | | The Wonderful World of Disney | | | | Who Wants to Be a Millionaire (8/12.4) | | The Practice (10/11.7) | |
| CBS | | 60 Minutes (15/11.1) | | Touched by an Angel (22/9.7) (Tied with The Weber Show* and NYPD Blue) | | CBS Sunday Movie (29/8.6) (Tied with Family Law and The District) | | | |
| Fox | Fall | Futurama | King of the Hill | The Simpsons | Malcolm in the Middle | The X-Files | | Local programming | |
| Fox | Winter | Futurama | King of the Hill | The Simpsons | Malcolm in the Middle | **The Lone Gunmen** | | Local programming | |
| Fox | Spring | Futurama | King of the Hill | The Simpsons | Malcolm in the Middle | The X-Files | | Local programming | |
| NBC | Fall | Dateline NBC | | **Ed** | | NBC Sunday Night Movie | | | |
| NBC | Late fall | World's Most Amazing Videos | | Dateline NBC | | NBC Sunday Night Movie | | | |
| NBC | Winter | NBA on NBC | | Dateline NBC | | NBC Sunday Night Movie | | | |
| NBC | Summer | Dateline NBC | | NBC Sunday Night Movie | | | | **The Weakest Link** | |
| UPN (from Feb. 11th through Apr. 15th) | | **XFL on UPN** | | | | | | Local programming | |
| The WB | Fall | The Jamie Foxx Show | For Your Love | The Steve Harvey Show | The PJs | **Hype** | **Nikki** | Local programming | |
| The WB | Mid-fall | The Jamie Foxx Show | The PJs | The Steve Harvey Show | **Hype** | **Nikki** | **Grosse Pointe** | Local programming | |
| The WB | Winter | The Jamie Foxx Show | The PJs | The Steve Harvey Show | The Steve Harvey Show (R) | **Nikki** | **Grosse Pointe** | Local programming | |
| The WB | Spring | The Jamie Foxx Show | The PJs | The Steve Harvey Show | **The Oblongs** | **Nikki** | For Your Love | Local programming | |
| The WB | Late spring | The PJs (R) | | The Steve Harvey Show (R) | | **Nikki** | For Your Love | Local programming | |
| The WB | Summer | Buffy the Vampire Slayer (R) | | The Steve Harvey Show (R) | For Your Love (R) | **Nikki** | For Your Love | Local programming | |
| The WB | Late summer | The Jamie Foxx Show (R) | | The Steve Harvey Show (R) | For Your Love (R) | **Nikki** | For Your Love | Local programming | |

Note: UPN had acquired the Sunday evening XFL games from February 11 to April 15 (to compete with Fox's Sunday night lineup), while NBC broadcast Saturdays games till the end of the XFL season.

* Cursed was renamed The Weber Show.

== Monday ==
| Network | | 8:00 p.m. | 8:30 p.m. | 9:00 p.m. | 9:30 p.m. | 10:00 p.m. | 10:30 p.m. |
|---|---|---|---|---|---|---|---|
| ABC | Fall | 20/20 Downtown | | NFL Monday Showcase | Monday Night Football (5/12.6) (Tied with Friends and Everybody Loves Raymond) | | |
| ABC | Winter | The ABC Monday Night Movie | | | | **Gideon's Crossing** | |
| ABC | Spring | The ABC Monday Night Movie | | | | | |
| ABC | Late spring | 20/20 Downtown | | The ABC Monday Night Movie | | | |
| CBS | | The King of Queens (27/8.9) | **Yes, Dear** (28/8.7) | Everybody Loves Raymond (5/12.6) (Tied with Friends and Monday Night Football) | Becker (16/10.9) | Family Law (29/8.6) (Tied with The District and the CBS Sunday Movie) | |
| Fox | | **Boston Public** | | Ally McBeal | | Local programming | |
| NBC | Fall | Daddio | **Tucker** | **Deadline** | | Third Watch | |
| NBC | Mid-fall | Dateline NBC | | Law & Order (R) | | Third Watch | |
| NBC | Late fall | **Titans** | | Dateline NBC | | Third Watch | |
| NBC | Winter | Mysterious Ways | | Dateline NBC | | Third Watch | |
| NBC | Spring | **The Weakest Link** | | Dateline NBC | | Third Watch | |
| NBC | Mid-spring | **The Weakest Link** | | **First Years** | | Third Watch | |
| NBC | Late spring | **Fear Factor** | | **The Weakest Link** | | Third Watch | |
| NBC | Summer | **Fear Factor** | | **The Weakest Link** | | Dateline NBC | |
| NBC | Mid-summer | **The Weakest Link** | | Third Watch (R) | | Dateline NBC | |
| UPN | Fall | Moesha | The Parkers | The Hughleys | **Girlfriends** | Local programming | |
| UPN | Winter | Moesha | The Hughleys | The Parkers | **Girlfriends** | Local programming | |
| UPN | Spring | The Parkers (R) | The Hughleys | The Parkers | **Girlfriends** | Local programming | |
| UPN | Summer | Moesha (R) | The Hughleys | The Parkers | **Girlfriends** | Local programming | |
| The WB | Fall | 7th Heaven | | Roswell | | Local programming | |
| The WB | Spring | 7th Heaven | | Angel (R) | | Local programming | |

== Tuesday ==
| Network | | 8:00 p.m. | 8:30 p.m. | 9:00 p.m. | 9:30 p.m. | 10:00 p.m. | 10:30 p.m. |
|---|---|---|---|---|---|---|---|
| ABC | Fall | Who Wants to Be a Millionaire (4/13.0) | | Dharma & Greg | **The Geena Davis Show** | Once and Again | |
| ABC | Winter | **The Mole** | | Dharma & Greg | **The Geena Davis Show** | NYPD Blue (22/9.7) (Tied with The Weber Show* and Touched by an Angel) | |
| ABC | Spring | Who Wants to Be a Millionaire (4/13.0) | | Dharma & Greg | **What About Joan?** | NYPD Blue (22/9.7) (Tied with The Weber Show* and Touched by an Angel) | |
| ABC | Late spring | Who Wants to Be a Millionaire (4/13.0) | | Dharma & Greg | **The Geena Davis Show** (R) | NYPD Blue (22/9.7) (Tied with The Weber Show* and Touched by an Angel) | |
| ABC | Summer | Who Wants to Be a Millionaire (4/13.0) | | Dharma & Greg | Spin City (R) | NYPD Blue (22/9.7) (Tied with The Weber Show* and Touched by an Angel) | |
| CBS | Fall | JAG (26/9.2) | | 60 Minutes II | | Judging Amy (21/9.9) | |
| CBS | Summer | Big Brother | | 60 Minutes II | | Judging Amy (21/9.9) | |
| CBS | Mid-summer | JAG (R) | | Big Brother | | Judging Amy (21/9.9) | |
| Fox | Fall | That '70s Show | Titus | **Dark Angel** | | Local programming | |
| Fox | Summer | That '70s Show | Titus | **Murder in Small Town X** | | Local programming | |
| NBC | Fall | **The Michael Richards Show** | 3rd Rock from the Sun | Frasier (17/10.7) (Tied with Temptation Island) | **DAG** | Dateline NBC | |
| NBC | Winter | 3rd Rock from the Sun | **DAG** | Frasier (17/10.7) (Tied with Temptation Island) | **Three Sisters** | Dateline NBC | |
| NBC | Late winter | **The Fighting Fitzgeralds** | **DAG** | Frasier (17/10.7) (Tied with Temptation Island) | **Three Sisters** | Dateline NBC | |
| NBC | Spring | **The Fighting Fitzgeralds** | 3rd Rock from the Sun | Frasier (17/10.7) (Tied with Temptation Island) | **Three Sisters** | Dateline NBC | |
| NBC | Summer | **Spy TV** (R) | **Go Fish** | Frasier (17/10.7) (Tied with Temptation Island) | **Kristin** | Dateline NBC | |
| NBC | Mid-summer | **Spy TV** (R) | **The Downer Channel** | Frasier (17/10.7) (Tied with Temptation Island) | **Three Sisters** (R) | Dateline NBC | |
| UPN | Fall | **UPN Movie Tuesday** | | | | Local programming | |
| UPN | Spring | **Chains of Love** | | **All Souls** | | Local programming | |
| UPN | Mid-spring | Seven Days | | **Chains of Love** | | Local programming | |
| UPN | Summer | Seven Days (R) | | | | Local programming | |
| The WB | Fall | Buffy the Vampire Slayer | | Angel | | Local programming | |
| The WB | Spring | **Flix from the Frog** | | | | Local programming | |
| The WB | Summer | **Gilmore Girls** (R) | | **Dead Last** | | Local programming | |

* Cursed was renamed The Weber Show.

== Wednesday ==
| Network | | 8:00 p.m. | 8:30 p.m. | 9:00 p.m. | 9:30 p.m. | 10:00 p.m. | 10:30 p.m. |
|---|---|---|---|---|---|---|---|
| ABC | Fall | Who Wants to Be a Millionaire (3/13.7) | | The Drew Carey Show | Spin City | **Gideon's Crossing** | |
| ABC | Winter | Who Wants to Be a Millionaire (3/13.7) | | The Drew Carey Show | Spin City | Once and Again | |
| ABC | Spring | **My Wife & Kids** | | The Drew Carey Show | **The Job** | Once and Again | |
| ABC | Mid-spring | Various programming | | The Drew Carey Show | Spin City | Once and Again | |
| ABC | Summer | The Drew Carey Show (R) | **You Don't Know Jack** | The Drew Carey Show | Spin City | **The Beast** | |
| ABC | Mid-summer | **My Wife & Kids** (R) | **The Wayne Brady Show** | The Drew Carey Show | **The Job** (R) | 20/20 Downtown | |
| CBS | Fall | **Bette** | **Welcome to New York** | CBS Wednesday Movie | | | |
| CBS | Winter | **Bette** | Various programming | CBS Wednesday Movie | | | |
| CBS | Late winter | Various programming | | | | | |
| CBS | Spring | Various programming | | CBS Wednesday Movie | | | |
| CBS | Summer | 60 Minutes II | | CBS Wednesday Movie | | | |
| Fox | Fall | Malcolm in the Middle | **Normal, Ohio** | The $treet | | Local programming | |
| Fox | Winter | That '70s Show (R) | **Grounded for Life** | **Temptation Island** (17/10.7) (Tied with Frasier) | | Local programming | |
| Fox | Spring | That '70s Show (R) | **Grounded for Life** | **Boot Camp** | | Local programming | |
| Fox | Late spring | Various programming | **Grounded for Life** | **Million Dollar Mysteries** | | Local programming | |
| Fox | Summer | Various programming | **Grounded for Life** | Titus (R) | Family Guy | Local programming | |
| NBC | Fall | **Titans** | | The West Wing (11/11.6) (Tied with Who Wants to Be a Millionaire and **CSI: Crime Scene Investigation**) | | Law & Order (9/12.3) | |
| NBC | Winter | **Ed** | | The West Wing (11/11.6) (Tied with Who Wants to Be a Millionaire and **CSI: Crime Scene Investigation**) | | Law & Order (9/12.3) | |
| UPN | Fall | Seven Days | | Star Trek: Voyager | | Local programming | |
| UPN | Spring | **Special Unit 2** | | Star Trek: Voyager | | Local programming | |
| UPN | Late spring | Star Trek: Voyager (R) | | | | Local programming | |
| UPN | Summer | Star Trek: Voyager (R) | | **Special Unit 2** (R) | | Local programming | |
| The WB | Fall | Dawson's Creek | | Felicity | | Local programming | |
| The WB | Winter | Dawson's Creek | | Jack & Jill | | Local programming | |
| The WB | Spring | Dawson's Creek | | Felicity | | Local programming | |
| The WB | Late spring | Dawson's Creek | | Buffy the Vampire Slayer | | Local programming | |
| The WB | Summer | **Flix from the Frog** | | | | Local programming | |

Notes: On Fox, Schimmel was supposed to air 8-8:30, but it was cancelled due to production problems.

- - Starting on February 28th, 2001, CBS aired **Some of My Best Friends** at 8pm ET, **Bette** at 8:30pm ET, then CBS Wednesday Movie at 9pm ET. On March 14 and March 21, 2001 while the NCAA Tournament was airing on Thursday nights, CBS aired Survivor: The Australian Outback at 8pm ET, **Big Apple** at 9pm ET and 48 Hours at 10pm ET. Starting March 28th, 2001, CBS aired **Some of My Best Friends** with various comedy repeats at 8pm ET, then CBS Wednesday Movie at 9pm ET. **Some of My Best Friends** was taken off the air after April 11th, 2001.

== Thursday ==
| Network | | 8:00 p.m. | 8:30 p.m. | 9:00 p.m. | 9:30 p.m. | 10:00 p.m. | 10:30 p.m. |
|---|---|---|---|---|---|---|---|
| ABC | Fall | Whose Line Is It Anyway? | | Who Wants to Be a Millionaire (11/11.6) (Tied with CSI: Crime Scene Investigation and The West Wing) | | Primetime | |
| ABC | Spring | Whose Line Is It Anyway? | Whose Line Is It Anyway? (R) | Who Wants to Be a Millionaire (11/11.6) (Tied with CSI: Crime Scene Investigation and The West Wing) | | Primetime | |
| CBS | Fall | 48 Hours | | City of Angels | | Diagnosis: Murder | |
| CBS | Winter | Survivor: The Australian Outback (1/17.4) | | **CSI: Crime Scene Investigation** (11/11.6) (Tied with Who Wants to Be a Millionaire and The West Wing) | | 48 Hours | |
| CBS | Late winter | Survivor: The Australian Outback (1/17.4) | | **CSI: Crime Scene Investigation** (11/11.6) (Tied with Who Wants to Be a Millionaire and The West Wing) | | **Big Apple** | |
| CBS | Spring | Survivor: The Australian Outback (1/17.4) | | **CSI: Crime Scene Investigation** (11/11.6) (Tied with Who Wants to Be a Millionaire and The West Wing) | | 48 Hours | |
| CBS | Summer | Big Brother | | **CSI: Crime Scene Investigation** (11/11.6) (Tied with Who Wants to Be a Millionaire and The West Wing) | | 48 Hours | |
| Fox | Fall | **Fox Thursday Night Movie** | | | | Local programming | |
| Fox | Summer | Guinness World Records Primetime | | **Night Visions** | | Local programming | |
| NBC | Fall | Friends (5/12.6) (Tied with Monday Night Football and Everybody Loves Raymond) | **Cursed*** (22/9.7) (Tied with NYPD Blue and Touched by an Angel) | Will & Grace (14/11.3) | Just Shoot Me! (20/10.4) | ER (2/15.0) | |
| NBC | Late fall | Friends (5/12.6) (Tied with Monday Night Football and Everybody Loves Raymond) | **The Weber Show*** (22/9.7) (Tied with NYPD Blue and Touched by an Angel) | Will & Grace (14/11.3) | Just Shoot Me! (20/10.4) | ER (2/15.0) | |
| NBC | Winter | Friends (5/12.6) (Tied with Monday Night Football and Everybody Loves Raymond) | Friends (R) | Will & Grace (14/11.3) | Just Shoot Me! (20/10.4) | ER (2/15.0) | |
| NBC | Spring | Friends (5/12.6) (Tied with Monday Night Football and Everybody Loves Raymond) | **The Weber Show*** (22/9.7) (Tied with NYPD Blue and Touched by an Angel) | Will & Grace (14/11.3) | Just Shoot Me! (20/10.4) | ER (2/15.0) | |
| NBC | Mid-spring | Friends (5/12.6) (Tied with Monday Night Football and Everybody Loves Raymond) | **Three Sisters** (R) | Will & Grace (14/11.3) | Just Shoot Me! (20/10.4) | ER (2/15.0) | |
| NBC | Summer | Friends (5/12.6) (Tied with Monday Night Football and Everybody Loves Raymond) | **Spy TV** | Will & Grace (14/11.3) | Just Shoot Me! (20/10.4) | ER (2/15.0) | |
| UPN | | WWF SmackDown! | | | | Local programming | |
| The WB | | **Gilmore Girls** | | Charmed | | Local programming | |

Note: On Fox, an untitled Michael Crichton project was supposed to air at midseason at 9–10, along with The Lone Gunmen at 8-9 but that Crichton project for Fox was scrapped.

* Cursed was renamed The Weber Show.

== Friday ==
| Network | | 8:00 p.m. | 8:30 p.m. | 9:00 p.m. | 9:30 p.m. | 10:00 p.m. | 10:30 p.m. |
|---|---|---|---|---|---|---|---|
| ABC | Fall | Two Guys and a Girl | **The Trouble with Normal** | Norm | **Madigan Men** | 20/20 | |
| ABC | Mid-fall | Two Guys and a Girl | **Dot Comedy** | Norm | **Madigan Men** | 20/20 | |
| ABC | Winter | Who Wants to Be a Millionaire (19/10.5) | | Two Guys and a Girl | Norm | 20/20 | |
| ABC | Mid-winter | Two Guys and a Girl | Norm | Who Wants to Be a Millionaire (19/10.5) | | 20/20 | |
| ABC | Spring | Making the Band | | Who Wants to Be a Millionaire (19/10.5) | | 20/20 | |
| ABC | Summer | America's Funniest Home Videos | | Who Wants to Be a Millionaire (19/10.5) | | 20/20 | |
| CBS | Fall | **The Fugitive** | | **CSI: Crime Scene Investigation** (11/11.6) (Tied with Who Wants to Be a Millionaire and The West Wing) | | Nash Bridges | |
| CBS | Winter | Diagnosis: Murder | | **The Fugitive** | | Nash Bridges | |
| CBS | Spring | Diagnosis: Murder (R) | | | | Nash Bridges | |
| CBS | Summer | Diagnosis: Murder (R) | | **That's Life** (R) | | 48 Hours | |
| Fox | Fall | World's Wildest Police Videos | | **FreakyLinks** | | Local programming | |
| Fox | Winter | World's Wildest Police Videos | | Special programming | | Local programming | |
| Fox | Late winter | World's Wildest Police Videos | | **The Lone Gunmen** | | Local programming | |
| Fox | Spring | **The Lone Gunmen** (R) | | **FreakyLinks** | | Local programming | |
| Fox | Summer | World's Wildest Police Videos | | **Dark Angel** (R) | | Local programming | |
| NBC | | Providence | | Dateline NBC | | Law & Order: Special Victims Unit (25/9.6) | |
| UPN | Fall | **Freedom** | | **Level 9** | | Local programming | |
| UPN | Winter | **Gary & Mike** | Celebrity Deathmatch | **Level 9** | | Local programming | |
| UPN | Mid-winter | **Gary & Mike** | Celebrity Deathmatch | Special programming | | Local programming | |
| UPN | Spring | The Parkers (R) | The Hughleys (R) | **Gary & Mike** | Various programming | Local programming | |
| UPN | Mid-spring | **UPN Movie Friday** | | | | Local programming | |
| UPN | Summer | **Manhunt** | | **All Souls** | | Local programming | |
| The WB | Fall | Sabrina the Teenage Witch | **Grosse Pointe** | Popular | | Local programming | |
| The WB | Mid-fall | Sabrina the Teenage Witch | Sabrina the Teenage Witch (R) | Popular | | Local programming | |
| The WB | Winter | Sabrina the Teenage Witch | **Popstars USA** | Popular | | Local programming | |
| The WB | Spring | Sabrina the Teenage Witch | Sabrina the Teenage Witch (R) | Popular | | Local programming | |
| The WB | Summer | Sabrina the Teenage Witch | Sabrina the Teenage Witch (R) | Charmed (R) | | Local programming | |

NOTE: ABC aired Dot Comedy on December 8, 2000, at 8:30pm ET. The show was cancelled after one episode aired. On Fox, Night Visions was supposed to air 8–9, but it was delayed to summer in a different timeslot on Thursdays.

== Saturday ==
| Network | | 8:00 p.m. | 8:30 p.m. | 9:00 p.m. | 9:30 p.m. | 10:00 p.m. | 10:30 p.m. |
|---|---|---|---|---|---|---|---|
| ABC | | ABC Big Picture Show | | | | | |
| CBS | Fall | **That's Life** | | Walker, Texas Ranger | | **The District** (29/8.6) (Tied with Family Law and the CBS Sunday Movie) | |
| CBS | Winter | **That's Life** | | **Kate Brasher** | | **The District** (29/8.6) (Tied with Family Law and the CBS Sunday Movie) | |
| CBS | Spring | Walker, Texas Ranger | | | | **The District** (29/8.6) (Tied with Family Law and the CBS Sunday Movie) | |
| CBS | Summer | Big Brother | | Walker, Texas Ranger (R) | | **The District** (29/8.6) (Tied with Family Law and the CBS Sunday Movie) | |
| Fox | Fall | COPS | COPS (R) | America's Most Wanted: America Fights Back | | Local programming | |
| Fox | Spring | COPS | | America's Most Wanted: America Fights Back | | Local programming | |
| NBC | Fall | **NBC Saturday Night Movie** | | | | | |
| NBC | Winter | **XFL on NBC** | | | | | |
| NBC | Spring | **NBC Saturday Night Movie** | | | | | |

== By network ==
=== ABC ===
**Returning series**

- ABC Big Picture Show
- 20/20
- The ABC Monday Night Movie
- America's Funniest Videos
- Dharma & Greg
- Making the Band
- Monday Night Football
- NYPD Blue
- Once and Again
- Primetime Thursday
- Spin City
- The Drew Carey Show
- The Norm Show
- The Practice
- The Wonderful World of Disney
- Two Guys and a Girl
- Who Wants to Be a Millionaire
- Whose Line Is It Anyway?

**New series**

- **The Beast** *
- **Dot Comedy** *
- **The Geena Davis Show**
- **Gideon's Crossing** *
- **The Job** *
- **Madigan Men**
- **The Mole** *
- **My Wife and Kids** *
- **The Trouble with Normal**
- **The Wayne Brady Show**
- **What About Joan?** *
- **You Don't Know Jack** *

Not returning from 1999–2000:

- Boy Meets World
- Clerks
- It's Like, You Know...
- Odd Man Out
- Oh, Grow Up
- Sabrina the Teenage Witch (moved to The WB)
- Snoops
- Sports Night
- Talk to Me
- The Hughleys (moved to UPN)
- Then Came You
- Turning Point
- Wasteland
- Wonderland

=== CBS ===
**Returning series**

- 48 Hours
- 60 Minutes
- 60 Minutes II
- Becker
- Big Brother
- Candid Camera
- CBS Wednesday Movie
- CBS Sunday Movie
- City of Angels
- Diagnosis: Murder
- Everybody Loves Raymond
- Family Law
- JAG
- Judging Amy
- The King of Queens
- Ladies Man
- Nash Bridges
- Survivor
- Touched by an Angel
- Walker, Texas Ranger

**New series**

- **Bette**
- **Big Apple** *
- **CSI: Crime Scene Investigation**
- **The District**
- **The Fugitive**
- **Kate Brasher** *
- **Some of My Best Friends** *
- **That's Life**
- **Welcome to New York**
- **Yes, Dear**

Not returning from 1999–2000:

- Chicago Hope
- Cosby
- Early Edition
- Falcone
- Grapevine
- Kids Say the Darndest Things (moved to ABC in 2019-20)
- Love & Money
- Martial Law
- Now and Again
- Winning Lines
- Work with Me

=== Fox ===
**Returning series**

- Ally McBeal
- America's Most Wanted
- Beyond Belief: Fact or Fiction
- Cops
- Family Guy
- Futurama
- Guinness World Records Primetime
- King of the Hill
- MADtv
- Malcolm in the Middle
- That '70s Show
- The Simpsons
- Titus
- The X-Files
- World's Wildest Police Videos

**New series**

- **Boot Camp** *
- **Boston Public**
- **Dark Angel**
- **FreakyLinks**
- **FOX Thursday Night Movie**
- **Grounded for Life** *
- **The Lone Gunmen** *
- **Million Dollar Mysteries** *
- **Murder in Small Town X** *
- **Night Visions** *
- **Normal, Ohio**
- The $treet
- **Temptation Island** *

Not returning from 1999–2000:

- Action
- Ally
- American High
- Beverly Hills, 90210
- Get Real
- Greed
- Harsh Realm
- Opposite Sex
- Party of Five
- The PJs (moved to The WB)
- Ryan Caulfield: Year One
- Time of Your Life
- The World's Funniest!

=== NBC ===
**Returning series**

- 3rd Rock from the Sun
- ER
- Daddio
- Dateline NBC
- Frasier
- Friends
- Just Shoot Me!
- Law & Order
- Law & Order: Special Victims Unit
- Mysterious Ways
- NBC Sunday Night Movie
- Providence
- Third Watch
- The West Wing
- Will & Grace
- World's Most Amazing Videos

**New series**

- **Cursed (renamed The Weber Show)**
- **DAG**
- **Deadline**
- **The Downer Channel** *
- **Ed**
- **Fear Factor** *
- **The Fighting Fitzgeralds** *
- **First Years** *
- **Go Fish** *
- **Kristin** *
- **NBC Saturday Night Movie**
- **The Michael Richards Show**
- **Spy TV** *
- **Three Sisters** *
- **Titans**
- **Tucker**
- **The Weakest Link** *

Not returning from 1999–2000:

- Battery Park
- Cold Feet
- Freaks and Geeks
- God, the Devil and Bob (returned to Adult Swim in 2011)
- Jesse
- The Mike O'Malley Show
- M.Y.O.B.
- The Others
- The Pretender
- Profiler
- Sammy
- Stark Raving Mad
- Suddenly Susan
- Twenty-One
- Veronica's Closet

=== UPN ===
**Returning series**

- The Hughleys (moved from ABC)
- Moesha
- The Parkers
- Seven Days
- Star Trek: Voyager
- WWF SmackDown!

**New series**

- **All Souls** *
- **Celebrity Deathmatch** *
- **Chains of Love** *
- **Freedom**
- **Gary and Mike** *
- **Girlfriends**
- **Level 9**
- **Manhunt** *
- **Special Unit 2**
- **UPN Movie Tuesday**
- **UPN Movie Friday**

Not returning from 1999–2000:

- The Beat
- Blockbuster Video Shockwave Cinema
- Dilbert
- Grown Ups
- I Dare You: The Ultimate Challenge
- Malcolm & Eddie
- Secret Agent Man
- Shasta McNasty
- The Strip

=== The WB ===
**Returning series**

- 7th Heaven
- Angel
- Buffy the Vampire Slayer
- Charmed
- Dawson's Creek
- Felicity
- For Your Love
- Jack & Jill
- Popular
- Roswell
- Sabrina the Teenage Witch (moved from ABC)
- The Jamie Foxx Show
- The PJs (moved from Fox)
- The Steve Harvey Show

**New series**

- **Dead Last**
- **Flix From the Frog**
- **Gilmore Girls**
- **Grosse Pointe**
- **Hype**
- **Nikki**
- **The Oblongs** *
- **Popstars USA** *

Not returning from 1999–2000:

- 7th Heaven Beginnings
- Baby Blues (returned to Adult Swim in 2002)
- Brutally Normal
- D.C.
- Movie Stars
- Mission Hill
- Safe Harbor
- Young Americans
- Zoe (formerly Zoe, Duncan, Jack, and Jane)

Note: The * indicates that the program was introduced in midseason.

== Renewals and cancellations ==
=== Renewals ===
==== ABC ====
- 20/20—Renewed for a twenty-fourth season.
- America's Funniest Videos—Renewed for a thirteenth season.
- Dharma & Greg—Renewed for a fifth and final season.
- The Drew Carey Show—Renewed for a seventh season.
- The Job—Renewed for a second season and delayed to 2002 due to the September 11, 2001 attacks.
- The Mole—Renewed for a second season.
- Monday Night Football—Renewed for a thirty-first season.
- My Wife And Kids—Renewed for a second season.
- NYPD Blue—Renewed for a ninth season.
- Once And Again—Renewed for a third and final season.
- The Practice—Renewed for a fifth season.
- Primetime Thursday—Renewed for a thirteenth season.
- Spin City—Renewed for a sixth and final season.
- What About Joan—Renewed for a second season.
- The Wayne Brady Show—Renewed for a second season.
- Who Wants to Be a Millionaire—Renewed for a third season.
- Whose Line Is It, Anyway?—Renewed for a fourth season.
- The Wonderful World of Disney—Renewed for a fortieth season.

==== CBS ====
- 48 Hours—Renewed for a twenty-fifth season.
- 60 Minutes—Renewed for a thirty-fourth season.
- Becker—Renewed for a fourth season.
- Big Brother—Renewed for a third season.
- CBS Sunday Movie—Renewed for a sixteenth season.
- CSI: Crime Scene Investigation—Renewed for a second season.
- The District—Renewed for a second season.
- Everybody Loves Raymond—Renewed for a sixth season.
- Family Law—Renewed for a third season.
- JAG—Renewed for a seventh season.
- Judging Amy—Renewed for a third season.
- The King of Queens—Renewed for a fourth season.
- Survivor—Renewed for a second and a third season.
- That's Life—Renewed for a second season.
- Touched by an Angel—Renewed for an eighth season.
- Yes, Dear—Renewed for a second season.

==== Fox ====
- Ally McBeal—Renewed for a fifth and final season.
- America's Most Wanted: America Fights Back—Renewed for a fourteenth season.
- Boston Public—Renewed for a second season.
- COPS—Renewed for a thirteenth season.
- Dark Angel—Renewed for a second season.
- Family Guy—Renewed for a third season.
- Futurama—Renewed for a third season.
- Grounded for Life—Renewed for a second season.
- King of the Hill—Renewed for a fifth season.
- Malcolm in the Middle—Renewed for a third season.
- The Simpsons—Renewed for a thirteenth season.
- Temptation Island—Renewed for a second season.
- That '70s Show—Renewed for a fourth season.
- Titus—Renewed for a third season.
- The X-Files—Renewed for a tenth and final season.

==== NBC ====
- Dateline NBC—Renewed for a tenth season.
- Ed—Renewed for a second season.
- ER—Renewed for an eighth season.
- Fear Factor—Renewed for a second season.
- Frasier—Renewed for a ninth season.
- Friends—Renewed for an eighth season.
- Just Shoot Me!—Renewed for a fifth season.
- Law & Order—Renewed for a twelfth season.
- Law & Order: Special Victims Unit—Renewed for a third season.
- Providence—Renewed for a fourth season.
- Third Watch—Renewed for a third season.
- Three Sisters—Renewed for a second season.
- Weakest Link—Renewed for a second season.
- The West Wing—Renewed for a third season.
- Will & Grace—Renewed for a fourth season.

==== UPN ====
- Girlfriends—Renewed for a second season.
- The Hughleys—Renewed for a fourth season.
- The Parkers—Renewed for a third season.
- Special Unit 2—Renewed for a second season.
- WWF SmackDown!—Renewed for a third season.

==== The WB ====
- 7th Heaven—Renewed for a seventh season.
- Angel—Renewed for a third season.
- Buffy the Vampire Slayer—Renewed for a sixth season, and moved to UPN.
- Charmed—Renewed for a fourth season.
- Dawson's Creek—Renewed for a fourth season.
- Felicity—Renewed for a fourth season.
- For Your Love—Renewed for a fifth and final season.
- Gilmore Girls—Renewed for a second season.
- Nikki—Renewed for a second season.
- Popstars USA—Renewed for a second season.
- Roswell—Renewed for a third and final season, and moved to UPN.
- Sabrina the Teenage Witch—Renewed for a sixth season.
- The Steve Harvey Show—Renewed for a sixth and final season.

=== Cancellations/series endings ===
==== ABC ====
- Dot Comedy—Cancelled after airing one episode on December 8, 2000.
- The Geena Davis Show—Cancelled after one season.
- Gideon's Crossing—Cancelled after one season.
- Madigan Men—Placed on hiatus and later cancelled after one season.
- The Norm Show—Cancelled after three seasons. The series finale aired April 6, 2001.
- The Trouble With Normal—Cancelled after one season.
- Two Guys and a Girl—Cancelled after four seasons. The series finale aired May 16, 2001.

==== CBS ====
- Bette—Cancelled after one season.
- Candid Camera—Moved to PAX.
- City of Angels—Cancelled after two seasons.
- Diagnosis: Murder—Ended its run after eight seasons. The series finale aired May 11, 2001
- Kate Brasher—Cancelled after six episodes.
- Nash Bridges—Ended its run after six seasons. The series finale aired on May 4, 2001.
- Some of My Best Friends—Cancelled after airing five out of the seven episodes produced.
- Walker, Texas Ranger—Ended its run after eight seasons. The series finale aired May 19, 2001.
- Welcome to New York—Cancelled after one season.

==== Fox ====
- FreakyLinks—Cancelled after one season.
- Normal, Ohio—Cancelled after one season.
- The $treet—Pulled from the schedule after seven episodes.

==== NBC ====
- 3rd Rock from the Sun—Ended its run after six seasons. The series finale aired May 22, 2001.
- Cursed—Cancelled after one season.
- Daddio—Pulled from the schedule after four episodes into its second season.
- DAG—Cancelled after one season.
- Deadline—Cancelled after one season.
- The Michael Richards Show—Cancelled after one season.
- Titans—Pulled from the schedule after 11 episodes.
- Tucker—Cancelled after one season.
- World's Most Amazing Videos—Later revived by Spike in 2008.

==== UPN ====
- Freedom—Pulled from the schedule after 7 episodes.
- Level 9—Pulled from the schedule after 10 episodes.
- Moesha—Cancelled after six seasons. The final episode aired on May 14, 2001.
- Seven Days—Cancelled after three seasons. The final episode aired on May 29, 2001.
- Star Trek: Voyager—Ended its run after seven seasons with a two-hour series finale on May 23, 2001. The next franchise entry, Star Trek: Enterprise premiered the following season.

==== The WB ====
- Grosse Pointe—Cancelled after one season.
- Hype—Cancelled after one season.
- Jack & Jill—Cancelled after two seasons.
- The Jamie Foxx Show—Cancelled after five seasons.
- The Oblongs—Cancelled after 13 episodes.
- The PJs—Cancelled after three seasons.
- Popular—Cancelled after two seasons.
