= List of programs broadcast by UPN =

The following is a list of programs broadcast by United Paramount Network (UPN). Some programs were carried over to The CW, a network formed through a partnership between WB parent company Time Warner and UPN corporate parent CBS Corporation, in September 2006 following the closure of The WB. Titles are listed in alphabetical order followed by the year of debut in parentheses.

== Drama ==
- Deadly Games (1995)
- Legend (1995)
- Live Shot (1995)
- Marker (1995)
- Nowhere Man (1995–96)
- Star Trek: Voyager (1995–2001)
- The Watcher (1995)
- The Burning Zone (1996–97)
- The Sentinel (1996–99)
- Swift Justice (1996)
- Legacy (1998–99)
- Love Boat: The Next Wave (1998–99)
- Mercy Point (1998–99)
- Seven Days (1998–2001)
- Power Play (1999)
- The Strip (1999–2000)
- The Beat (2000)
- Freedom (2000)
- Level 9 (2000–01)
- Secret Agent Man (2000)
- All Souls (2001)
- Buffy the Vampire Slayer (2001–03; moved from The WB)
- Roswell (2001–02; moved from The WB)
- Special Unit 2 (2001–02)
- Star Trek: Enterprise (2001–05)
- Haunted (2002)
- The Twilight Zone (2002–03)
- Jake 2.0 (2003–04)
- Platinum (2003)
- Kevin Hill (2004–05)
- Veronica Mars (2004–06)
- Sex, Love & Secrets (2005)
- South Beach (2006)

== Comedy ==
- Pig Sty (1995)
- Platypus Man (1995)
- Goode Behavior (1996–97)
- Homeboys in Outer Space (1996–97)
- In the House (1996–98; moved from NBC)
- Malcolm & Eddie (1996–2000)
- Minor Adjustments (1996; moved from NBC)
- Moesha (1996–2001)
- Social Studies (1996–97)
- Sparks (1996–98)
- Breaker High (1997–98)
- Clueless (1997–99; moved from ABC)
- Good News (1997–98)
- Head Over Heels (1997–98)
- Hitz (1997–98)
- DiResta (1998–99)
- Guys Like Us (1998–99)
- Reunited (1998)
- The Secret Diary of Desmond Pfeiffer (1998)
- Between Brothers (1999; moved from Fox)
- Family Rules (1999)
- Grown Ups (1999–2000)
- The Parkers (1999–2004)
- Shasta McNasty (1999–2000)
- Girlfriends (2000–06)
- The Hughleys (2000–02; moved from ABC)
- One on One (2001–06)
- As If (2002)
- Half & Half (2002–06)
- The Random Years (2002)
- Abby (2003)
- All of Us (2003–06)
- Eve (2003–06)
- The Mullets (2003–04)
- Rock Me Baby (2003–04)
- Second Time Around (2004–2005)
- The Bad Girl's Guide (2005)
- Cuts (2005–06)
- Everybody Hates Chris (2005–06)
- Love, Inc. (2005–06)

== Adult animation ==
- Dilbert (1999–2000)
- Celebrity Deathmatch (2001; borrowed from MTV)
- Game Over (2004)
- Gary & Mike (2001)
- Home Movies (1999; moved to Adult Swim)

== Reality/unscripted ==
- America's Greatest Pets (1998)
- The Virtual Ed Sullivan Show (aired pilot from May 18, 1998)
- America's Next Top Model (2003–06; moved to The CW from 2006 until 2015, then revived on VH1 from 2016 until 2018)
- Amish in the City (2004)
- Britney and Kevin: Chaotic (2005)
- Chains of Love (2001)
- Dance 360 (2004–05)
- Get This Party Started (2006)
- I Dare You: The Ultimate Challenge (2000)
- Iron Chef USA (2001 special)
- Manhunt (2001)
- Man O Man (1995 special)
- The Paranormal Borderline (1996)
- The Player (2004)
- R U the Girl (2005)
- The Road to Stardom with Missy Elliott (2005)
- Under One Roof (2002)
- WWF/E Smackdown! (1999–2006)
- WWE Tough Enough (2004; moved from MTV from 2001 until 2003, later revived on USA Network from 2011 until 2015)
- XFL (2001; aired simultaneously on NBC and TNN)

== Children's programming ==
=== UPN Kids (originals) ===
- Breaker High (1997–98)
- Bureau of Alien Detectors (1996–97)
- The Incredible Hulk (1996–99)
- Jumanji (1996–98)
- The Mouse and the Monster (1996–97)
- Space Strikers (1995–96)
- Sweet Valley High (1997–98; moved from first-run syndication)
- Teknoman (1995–96)

=== UPN Kids (acquired) ===
- Beetleborgs (1998–99)
- Fantastic Four (1998–99)
- Iron Man (1998–99)
- Spider-Man (1998–99)
- Spider-Man and His Amazing Friends (1998–99)
- X-Men (1998–99)

=== Disney's One Too (originals) ===
- Buzz Lightyear of Star Command (2000–03)
- Digimon Frontier (2002–03)
- Sabrina: The Animated Series (1999–2002)
- The Legend of Tarzan (2001–03)

=== Disney's One Too (acquired) ===
- Digimon Tamers (2002)
- Disney's Doug (1999–2000)
- Hercules (1999)
- Pepper Ann (2000–01)
- Recess (1999–2003)
- The Weekenders (2001–02)

== Syndicated programming ==
- 101 Dalmatians: The Series
- Baywatch
- Baywatch Nights
- Dragon Ball Z (season 1 and season 2)
- Eagle Riders
- Entertainment Tonight
- Gladiators 2000
- Hercules: The Legendary Journeys
- Masked Rider (season 2)
- Maury
- The Montel Williams Show
- Pokémon (season 1)
- Real Stories of the Highway Patrol
- Ricki Lake
- Saban's Adventures of Oliver Twist
- Sailor Moon
- Sally
- Star Trek: Deep Space Nine
- Sweet Valley High (seasons 1–3)
- VR Troopers
- The Wacky World of Tex Avery
- The Why Why Family
- Xena: Warrior Princess

== See also ==
- List of programs broadcast by The CW
