= Chains of Love (TV series) =

2001 American TV show

- Genre: Dating game show
- Presented by: Madison Michele
- Country of origin: United States
- Original language: English
- No. of seasons: 1
- No. of episodes: 6

Production
- Executive producer: David Garfinkle
- Production location: Palos Verdes Estates, California
- Camera setup: Multi-camera
- Running time: 60 minutes
- Production company: Endemol

Original release
- Network: UPN
- Release: April 17 – May 22, 2001

Chains of Love is an American dating game show that aired for six episodes in April–May 2001 on UPN. Adapted from a Dutch television series, it revolves around a man or woman being chained to four members of the opposite sex over four days and nights. This person, identified as the "Picker", is given $10,000 and can remove three contestants one at a time. The Picker can give a portion of the money to each eliminated participant. When left with a single partner, the Picker can choose to either split the money or keep it. American television personality Madison Michele hosted each episode.

Chains of Love was originally ordered by NBC, before UPN began producing it. The program was produced as part of a campaign to have more unscripted programming in UPN's schedule to boost the network's ratings. Media outlets have identified Chains of Love as part of a renaissance in reality television. David Garfinkle, who had previously worked on the show Blind Date, served as the executive producer.

Before its premiere, UPN had promoted the series through a month-long online campaign aimed at young women. Initially broadcast on Tuesday nights at 8:00 pm EST, the network envisioned the show as a companion piece to the simulated fugitive-chase series Manhunt. Media outlets questioned whether the show's airing on network television had restricted its content. Critical feedback to Chains of Love was mixed, the show's premise dividing television critics. Its structure and tone were compared to other programs where contestants seek love partners, such as Blind Date and The Dating Game.

== Gameplay ==
A promotional image illustrating how the participants were chained together during the show. For each episode, the contestants were kept together for four days and nights and were only allowed privacy during specified moments.

In each episode, five contestants are taken to a house in Palos Verdes Estates, California. Bound together by a six-foot chain, they are linked by their hands and feet in the "Ritual Room" by the "Lockmaster", played by a muscular man in a suit and sunglasses. The participants are kept less than 24 inches from each other during filming. The chaining of the contestants is not shown on-screen.

The group includes a "Picker" and four potential suitors, referred to as "playmates". The four contestants are selected based on how their answers to questions in an earlier interview matched the qualities the Picker sought in a suitor. Both men and women have been Pickers; the four participants are always the opposite sex of the Picker. The group remains chained together for four days and nights and is taken to complete day-to-day tasks, such as grocery shopping, preparing food, and ice skating. There are certain times when individuals are allowed their privacy, including using the bathroom, bathing, and changing clothing.

At the start of each episode, the Picker is provided with $10,000 to give to the other participants based on his or her personal preferences. The Picker eliminates potential matches, who are then unchained by the Lockmaster. As each contestant leaves, the Picker can decide to give a portion of the money to them. When one contestant remains, the Picker can choose to split the remaining cash with them if they feel that a "love connection" has been formed. The Picker can also choose to keep the money for themselves. The final contestant can refuse to be involved any further in a relationship.

== Production ==
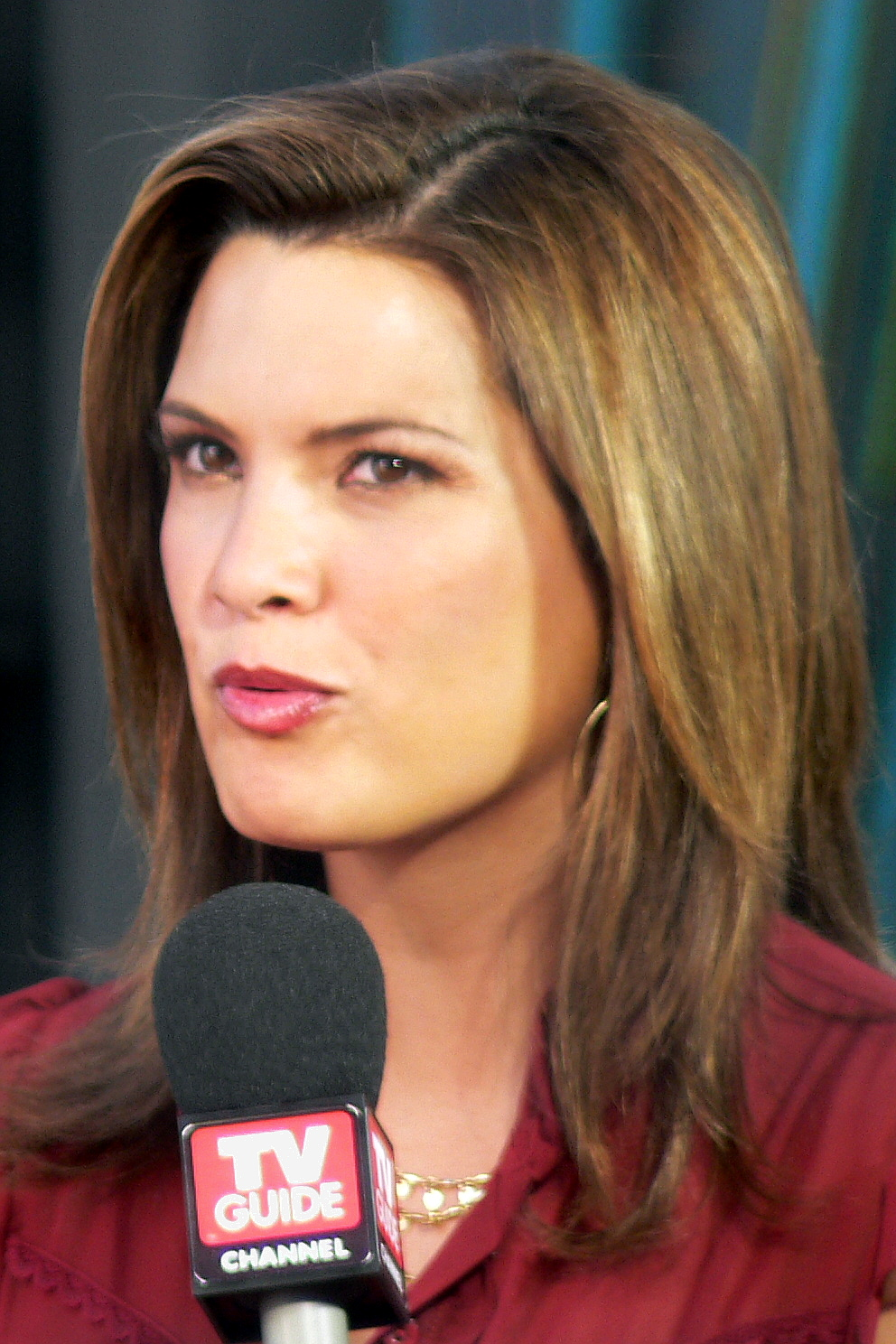
American television personality Madison Michele (pictured in 2005) hosted the show.

Chains of Love was inspired by a television program from the Netherlands with the format being sold into Australia, Holland, the US, and the UK. The Dutch company Endemol handled the production, and David Garfinkle acted as the executive producer. Garfinkle had previously worked on the American dating game show Blind Date. It was also produced by people involved in the development of the reality game show franchise Big Brother. Garfinkle said that he was not certain how the series would unfold during its broadcast, explaining that the competition among the contestants began to resemble soap operas such as Melrose Place. American television personality Madison Michele hosted each episode.

Chains of Love was initially picked up by NBC, in an agreement with Endemol where the network would produce nine episodes of an unidentified program. NBC eventually decided not to pursue the series due to creative differences with its producer. Newsweek's Marc Peyser believed that NBC dropped out of the project on "moral grounds" due to its premise. The network chose to adapt the Dutch show Now or Neverland into Fear Factor in place of Chains of Love. UPN began producing Chains of Love, along with three other reality television shows, as part of its extensive campaign to air more unscripted content on the network.

The New York Times' Bill Carter identified the series as part of a "second wave of reality shows" that started from the success of the reality competition television franchise Survivor. Carter interpreted new reality programming as "designed to push the envelope of prime-time broadcasting" content. In her 2007 chapter "Models of (Im)perfection", writer Kimberly K. Bell wrote that Chains of Love contained a similar production style to Survivor; she commented that both shows are set in "elaborately structured playing fields", in which producers edit the contestant's identity to better appeal to an audience.

UPN executives associated the rise in interest in unscripted content as connected to its low production costs compared to scripted programming and its appeal to a younger demographic. Network president Dean Valentine explained: "From a societal view, audiences, especially young people, are finding it harder and harder to relate to fictional storytelling – it just seems fake to them." The network's entertainment chief Tom Nunan said the series was intended to improve the network's ratings, explaining: "There's a wave of television viewer right now that is very clear to us – it shows that audiences seem to be responding to these event programs that don't feel like cookie-cutter TV."

Interpreting the titular chains as "metaphors for the bonds of human affection", Valentine found the series was primarily an example of physical comedy. He emphasized that the show was not directly related to sadomasochism. Valentine said that the show's appeal would extend beyond sexuality, identifying the contestants as "kind of morph[ing] together [as] they have to deal with acceptance, rejection, fear, need". He explained that the process was "so emotional and stripped down [that] you almost feel like you're watching an est session".

== Episodes ==
No.	Title	Original release date	US viewers (millions)
1	"Stephanie, the Model"	April 17, 2001	2.1
Model Stephanie has to choose among four men after spending time with them.
2	"Andy, the Stuntman"	April 24, 2001	1.7
Professional stuntman Andy has to eliminate three women one at a time.
3	"Jennifer, the Cheerleader"	May 1, 2001	1.5
Cheerleader Jennifer is chained to four men, and must decide which one she likes the most.
4	"John, the Corporate Attorney"	May 8, 2001	1.4
After being chained to four women, corporate attorney John must eliminate three of them over the course of four days.
5	"Jenny, the College Student"	May 15, 2001	1.2
College student Jenny must pick among four men by eliminating them one by one.
6	"Tomas, the Graduate Student"	May 22, 2001	1.7
Graduate student Tomas is chained to four women and is looking for love with one of them.

== Broadcast history ==
Chains of Love was one of three series that debuted on UPN during the 2000–01 US television schedule as a mid-season replacement; the other two were Special Unit 2 and All Souls. Chains of Love was broadcast initially on Tuesday nights at 8:00 pm EST, premiering on April 17, 2001. UPN picked it up originally as a companion piece to the 2001 Manhunt, in which pretend fugitives ran away from actors posing as bounty hunters. During its broadcast, Chains of Love was briefly paired with All Souls, which UPN placed on a hiatus after two episodes were aired.

Before the show's debut, the network had conducted a month-long online promotional campaign. The advertisements, specifically aimed at women from the ages of 12 to 34 years old, appeared on the websites Targetmatch.com, Madhive.com, and Ecrush.com. The Marina del Rey-based marketing firm L90, who had previously done work for UPN for the series Gary & Mike, created the campaign. Lauren Kay, the company's vice president of marketing, said that for the show they put together a "clean simple branding program" using pop-up ads, flash animation, and a sweepstake done through a microsite.

Media outlets questioned whether the show's broadcast on network television had a limited impact on its more mature content. Carman identified a scene as confusing in which the Picker suggested skinny-dipping in a hot tub to the four women, followed by a shot of them appearing in swimsuits. Peyser equated the sexual content with that of Dawson's Creek, and wrote that it was not as explicit as he had first imagined.

UPN canceled Chains of Love after its six-episode season. The series is available for streaming on Tubi. Following the show's cancellation, William Shatner and Valentine parodied it during an event at Madison Square Garden, where they appeared chained together.

== Critical reception ==
On its debut, Chains of Love received primarily negative feedback from television critics. Equating the concept to "televised prostitution", the Pittsburgh Post-Gazette's Rob Owen wrote that the program represented the worst aspects of television, and did not believe it would have even a guilty-pleasure appeal for viewers. A writer for The Augusta Chronicle described the series as an embarrassment for the network. In his 2005 book From Daytime to Primetime: The History of American Television Programs, scholar James W. Brown felt the concept fostered an environment for emotional and physical abuse.

Some commentators had more positive comments for the series. Even though he heavily panned the show for lowering contestants' dignity to attract viewers, the San Francisco Chronicle's John Carman wrote that he was interested in watching how each of the men would approach the situation differently. Entertainment Weekly's Dan Snierson described it as "the most bizarre and captivating reality series in TV history" due primarily to its premise.

Chains of Love was often compared to other television shows. Due to the series' emphasis on gender relations as part of its game theory, Brown identified Chains of Love as descendant of The Dating Game and Anything Goes (a show featuring strip poker). Marc Peyser of Newsweek wrote that the producers of the series maintained the same irreverent tone from Blind Date. Later dating shows, Elimidate Deluxe and Tethered, were described as borrowing elements from Chains of Love, specifically the concept of having a contestant go on a date with four individuals and binding people together to complete specific tasks.
