= Dot Comedy =

2000 American television show

- Genre: Reality television
- Created by: Carrie Gerlach
- Written by: Ed Driscoll
- Presented by: Sklar Brothers
- Starring: Melissa Disney; Katie Puckrik; Sklar Brothers; Annabelle Gurwitch
- Music by: Mosher and Stoker
- Country of origin: United States
- Original language: English
- No. of seasons: 1
- No. of episodes: 5 (4 unaired)

Production
- Running time: Approx. 26 minutes
- Production companies: Oxygen; The Carsey-Werner Company

Original release
- Network: ABC
- Release: December 8, 2000

Dot Comedy is an American television series that aired on ABC on December 8, 2000. It is notable for being a series that was canceled after only one episode.

== Premise ==
Dot Comedy was an early attempt at bringing Internet humor to mass television audiences in the pre-broadband era, which premiered on ABC on December 8, 2000. The show was hosted by Annabelle Gurwitch, the Sklar Brothers, and Katie Puckrik. Adapted from a British show of the same name, the show featured a similar premise to America's Funniest Home Videos in that the hosts and audience react to ostensibly humorous content originating on websites. In addition, Puckrik would interview the creators of the web content presented. Viewers were also encouraged to submit their own web content, such as video, audio, and image files. The show was a co-production with the television channel Oxygen, and episodes were planned to air afterwards on Oxygen after being broadcast on ABC.

The show replaced The Trouble with Normal on ABC, which had been cancelled after five episodes as part of a troubled post-TGIF attempt to relaunch the night with adult-targeted sitcoms. Dot Comedy did even worse, being viewed by 4.1 million viewers in its only aired episode before also being cancelled. The remaining four episodes never aired.

== Critical reception ==
Bob Curtright of The Wichita Eagle gave the show a mixed review. He thought that the show had the potential to display humorous content on the Internet and give a platform through which content creators could gain exposure, but criticized the Sklar Brothers' hosting as "superfluous".
