= Kathy's So-Called Reality =

- Genre: Reality television
- Presented by: Kathy Griffin
- Country of origin: United States
- Original language: English
- No. of seasons: 1
- No. of episodes: 6

Original release
- Network: MTV
- Release: February 4 – April 1, 2001

Kathy's So-Called Reality is a television clip show that aired in 2001, hosted by comedian and former Suddenly Susan star Kathy Griffin.

The show was "part monologue, part round-table", featuring Griffin discussing clips from a variety of reality television shows the prior week with a panel of family and friends. According to Griffin, the reality shows, even the "scandal-plagued" Temptation Island, "amazingly" contributed clips to be mocked. The show premiered on February 4, 2001, on MTV, and ended on April 1, 2001, after airing only six episodes; the network did not renew the show due to low ratings. USA Today columnist Whitney Matheson wrote that the show "seemed to be struggling for content," and "all the good jokes are taken by the time Kathy's weekly rant sees airtime."
