= The Beast (2001 TV series) =

American drama television series

- Genre: Drama
- Created by: Kario Salem
- Written by: Doug Palau; Jeff Pinkner; Kario Salem
- Directed by: Lou Antonio; Jeff Bleckner; Mimi Leder; Ian Sander
- Starring: Elizabeth Mitchell; Jason Gedrick; Frank Langella
- Composer: Joseph Vitarelli
- Country of origin: United States
- Original language: English
- No. of seasons: 1
- No. of episodes: 6

Production
- Executive producers: Brian Grazer; Ron Howard; Tony Krantz; Mimi Leder; Kim Moses; Kario Salem; Ian Sander
- Producers: Kario Salem; Geeta Patel
- Cinematography: Anette Haellmigk; Charles Minsky
- Editor: Martin Nicholson
- Running time: 48 minutes (approx.)
- Production companies: Imagine Television; Touchstone Television

Original release
- Network: ABC
- Release: June 13 – July 25, 2001

The Beast is an American drama television series that aired on ABC from June 13 to July 25, 2001. Created by Kario Salem, the series was canceled after six episodes.

== Synopsis ==
The series stars Elizabeth Mitchell as Alice Allenby, a New York journalist who takes a job at World News Service, a Los Angeles based 24-hour cable news television station. Supporting cast members include Jason Gedrick as news anchor Resse McFadden and Frank Langella as Jackson Burns, the owner of World News Service.

== Cast ==
- Elizabeth Mitchell as Alice Allenby, a reporter from New York who began working at WNS in the pilot. She became a celebrity after her first story and the public and Jackson viewed her as an on-screen beauty and was often complimented on her good looks.
- Jason Gedrick as Reese McFadden, the main anchor for WNS who made the job his own.
- Frank Langella as Jackson Burns, The owner of WNS and lover of Sonia. He created the channel and treated everyone like who worked for WNS like his family, especially Alice, who he felt he needed to protect.
- Naveen Andrews as Timir Naipaul, worked for WNS as a camera man and other things. He named the show the beast and that became the nickname for it by everyone.
- Wendy Crewson as Maggie Steech, works for Jackson and has a desire to have a child but she finds out she cannot have children.
- April Grace as Sonia, A reporter for WNS and lover of Jackson.
- Peter Riegert as Ted Fisher, Works for Jackson and has anger issues. He has been fired from every other broadcasting station in the country.
- Harriet Sansom Harris as Mrs. Sweeney, Jackson's assistant and the mother of WNS.
- Kario Salem as Harry, The eyes of WNS. He watches everyone and decides what is aired on the web and, when there's nothing else to put on, the TV.

== Episodes ==
No.	Title	Directed by	Written by	Original release date
1	"The Price"	Mimi Leder	Kario Salem	June 13, 2001
2	"The Damage Done"	Jeff Bleckner	Doug Palau & Kario Salem	June 20, 2001
3	"The Delivery"	Ian Sander	Unknown	June 27, 2001
4	"Travinia: Part 1"	Unknown	Unknown	July 11, 2001
5	"Travinia: Part 2"	Unknown	Unknown	July 18, 2001
6	"Functional Family"	Unknown	Unknown	July 25, 2001
