= All Souls (TV series) =

American paranormal medical drama television series

- Genre: Paranormal medical drama
- Created by: Stuart Gillard; Stephen Tolkin
- Starring: Reiko Aylesworth; Daniel Cosgrove; Irma P. Hall; Grayson McCouch; Adam Rodriguez; Serena Scott Thomas
- Composer: Joel McNeely
- Country of origin: United States
- Original language: English
- No. of seasons: 1
- No. of episodes: 6

Production
- Executive producers: Mark Frost; Aaron Spelling; E. Duke Vincent; Stuart Gillard; Stephen Tolkin
- Production locations: Montreal, Quebec, Canada
- Running time: 60 minutes
- Production companies: Spelling Television; Uncle Monkey Productions

Original release
- Network: UPN
- Release: April 17 – August 31, 2001

All Souls is an American paranormal medical drama television series created by Stuart Gillard and Stephen Tolkin and inspired by Lars von Trier's miniseries The Kingdom. It originally aired for one season on UPN from April 17 to August 31, 2001. The series follows the medical staff of the haunted teaching hospital All Souls. While working as a medical intern, protagonist Dr. Mitchell Grace (Grayson McCouch) encounters various spirits, and discovers that the doctors are running unethical experiments on their patients. The executive producers included Aaron Spelling, E. Duke Vincent, and Mark Frost.

Gillard developed the premise for All Souls from his belief that a medical facility would be an ideal setting for a horror series and his research on statistics of deaths that had taken place in a hospital. Frost also felt that there was a close connection between modern medicine and the supernatural. Though the series was set in Boston, filming took place in Montreal, Canada. Episodes were shot in a working psychiatric hospital, and real patients appear in the background of several scenes.

All Souls had low viewership, and was placed on hiatus following the broadcast of the first two episodes and canceled after the season was broadcast. Critical response to All Souls was primarily positive; commentators praised its use of horror and paranormal elements. Critics had mixed reviews for the show's content and style when compared to other horror and science-fiction television series, specifically The X-Files and the work of American writer Stephen King.

== Premise ==
Described as a "paranormal hospital drama" by UPN, All Souls follows the medical staff working in the Boston teaching hospital of the same name. The area has a history dating back to the American Civil War. A photograph taken during the war is prominently featured in the series, as it shows individuals who still work as part of the staff. The hauntings at All Souls started during the Civil War, when a Dr. Abramson conducted experiments on his patients following the death of his three sons in combat. The ghosts of Abramson's victims remain in the hospital to the present day. The facility is composed of "dungeons, trick elevators, deserted floors, passageways filled with smoke and dripping water" and "dark, dank, cavelike areas". It had previously functioned as a psychiatric hospital, which was housed on the upper levels of the structure's tower.

The main narrative includes "hints of deeper, good-versus-evil contests". Taking inspiration from the horror film genre, the series includes "extreme closeups [and] bizarre sexual transformations". In the pilot episode, a seduction scene with a doctor and a young woman ends when she is revealed to be a corpse, and several women die after being admitted for treatment. Although the series follows a specific mythology and continuity, each episode has its own self-contained story.

== Characters ==
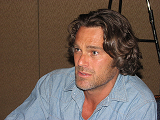
Grayson McCouch (pictured in 2009) played the show's lead character Dr. Mitchell Grace.

UPN executives had pitched the series as following "young doctors in peril at a haunted old Boston Hospital" who must contend with "a healthy dose of terrifying paranormal occurrences and gripping medical emergencies". In the pilot episode, Dr. Mitchell Grace (Grayson McCouch) begins working at the hospital immediately after graduating from medical school. He had specifically chosen the All Souls medical program, refusing offers from the Mayo Clinic and the Yale–New Haven Hospital, due to his personal connection with the hospital. Grace's father died in 1978 while working as a janitor in the hospital, after contracting a mysterious illness. Grace serves as the show's lead character, and functions as a detective as well as a doctor while trying to understand the inner workings of All Souls. As he works, Grace encounters both good and evil ghosts, and discovers medical experiments are being conducted under the guidance of the board of directors. Spirits include "a mad scientist and his Igor-like errand boy", and a woman dressed in 19th century fashion pushing a baby carriage through the halls. Grace is haunted by visions of his father, and is somehow connected with the ghost Lazarus and Civil War doctors. Dr. Dante Ambrosious (Jean LeClerc), the chair of the facility's board, is shown to have made deals with the evil spirits.

Grace works closely with several allies during his time at All Souls, but is the one of few people who is fully aware of the hospital's supernatural occurrences. He collaborates with registered nurse Glory St. Claire (Irma P. Hall), who has a long history with the facility and "knows more than she can say or, at least, explain". She is characterized by her telepathic powers. According to St. Claire, "the dead have power" in the hospital and the "forces of good" residing inside All Souls had foretold of Grace's arrival for several decades. She connects with Grace by holding his hands to allow him to see the "tortured soul" in the hospital. Grace finds further support from Dr. Nicole De Brae (Serena Scott Thomas), Dr. Bradley Sterling (Daniel Cosgrove), and Patrick Fortado (Adam Rodriguez). De Brae acts as the hospital's chief of staff and Sterling works alongside Grace as a medical intern. Fortado is Grace's close friend, a paraplegic who has great skill at hacking. The exact nature of De Brae's loyalty is called into question, and Tim Goodman of the San Francisco Chronicle wondered if she will serve as a love interest or be revealed as one of the hospital's spirits. Other members of the medical staff include the psychologist Dr. Philomena Cullen (Reiko Aylesworth) and the orderly Joey (Christian Tessier).

== Production ==
=== Concept and filming ===
"It honestly felt like very fertile ground for a sort of horror/science fiction-based series, and I think anybody who has been in a hospital or spent a lot of time there, they have a kind of cringing feeling about the experience—particularly if they've lost someone or come close to losing their own life. So it's just taking that level of reality and moving it one step further."

— Mark Frost discussing the show's influences

Created by Stuart Gillard and Stephen Tolkin, All Souls was produced by Spelling Television and Uncle Monkey Productions. Along with the show's creators, the executive producers included Aaron Spelling, E. Duke Vincent, and Mark Frost. Media outlets found the pairing of Spelling and Frost for the production strange. Variety's Steven Oxman described it as a "merging of the beauty and the beast"; he equated Spelling to the beauty for incorporating the "sleek and superficial good looks" and Frost to the beast for his inclusion of "surreal, beastly creepiness". The duo had previously collaborated on the crime drama television series Buddy Faro.

Gillard felt that a medical facility would be an ideal candidate for a horror show, explaining: "Hospitals are scary places even if you're healthy (and) going to visit somebody." While conducting research to develop the series' concept, he was surprised that roughly 80,000 people die in hospitals every year due to unknown causes. Echoing Gillard's comments, Frost argued there is a close connection between the supernatural and modern medicine. Describing a hospital as a "pretty paranormal place", he felt that medicine would "only have to go one step further to get to the paranormal". All Souls was inspired by the Lars von Trier miniseries The Kingdom, and has been compared to the Stephen King television series Kingdom Hospital. While promoting the series, Frost had said the show had been partly inspired by the science fiction drama The X-Files.

Tom Burstyn handled the cinematography, and the production designers were Michael Joy and Collin Niemi. James L. Conway contributed to the show as a consulting producer, and Joel McNeely composed the musical score. Although the show is set in Boston, filming took place in Montreal, Canada. The episodes were shot in a functioning asylum constructed in Montreal during the 19th century, with real patients walking around during certain scenes, which Frost said added realism.

=== Development and casting ===
The series had originated from a production deal between Syfy and CBS Paramount Network Television. Thomas Vitale, the senior vice president of programming and original movies for Syfy, described the partnership as a way to add more "genre programming to our schedule". It was one of three series (alongside Chains of Love and Special Unit 2) UPN ordered as mid-season replacements during the 2000–2001 television season. The network had requested six episodes of All Souls when picking it up for air, and all of them had been shot before its cancellation. The Seattle Post-Intelligencer's John Levesque felt that the network decided to produce All Souls in an attempt to find another successful series following the end of Star Trek: Voyager. While Levesque thought the shows were "promising", he did not believe any of them were a "slam-dunk".

Rodriquez initially refused to audition as he wanted to be a part of the 2000 drama The Street instead. After the producers contacted him repeatedly, he read for the parts of Fortado and Sterling five times and talked to Spelling. After he was not cast in The Street, he accepted the part of Fortado; he particularly wanted to work on a show produced by Spelling. Filming in a wheelchair gave him an increased awareness and appreciation for handicapped people.

== Episodes ==
No.	Title	Directed by	Written by	Original release date	U.S. viewers (millions)
1	"Pilot"	Stuart Gillard	Stephen Tolkin	April 17, 2001	2.12
Dr. Mitchell Grace starts his work at All Souls. He fails to save Caroline Patterson, a patient who was moved to a basement room by a suspicious orderly. Dr. Ryman Kreeger, a senior doctor who thinks he can live forever through a procedure called the "Gemini Project", is killed by the hospital's ghosts.
2	"Spineless"	Stuart Gillard	Stuart Gillard	April 24, 2001	1.48
Kirstin Caine, a hit and run victim with spinal trauma, is admitted to the hospital. Patrick Fortado becomes the subject of Dr. Stefani Volette's research, which results in her killing Kirstin to treat him. Fortrado discovers his paralysis was not caused by his accident, but was induced by Volette as part of her research. After falling from a building, Volette becomes a subject in her own experiment.
3	"The Deal"	Stuart Gillard	Scott Frost	May 1, 2001	1.54
Jordan Holland, the son of Tremaine and Alice Anne Holland, is admitted to the psychiatric ward. It is revealed he died at birth, and was saved by Dr. Dante Ambrosious to fulfill his destiny starting on his 18th birthday. Tremaine tries and fails to stop the plan; he kills himself before Jordan leaves with Ambrosious.
4	"Bad Blood"	Stuart Gillard	Mark Frost	August 17, 2001	1.5
Dr. Juan Antonio Marquez is flown in for special treatment at the same time an identical man is admitted to the hospital. Marquez had a blood infection, which kills anyone else infected including his in-flight doctor and nurse Cathy Cavalleri. The identical patient is shown to be the real Marquez, and he was replaced by Colonel Avejo. Avejo tortured Marquez during their time in prison, and he deliberately infects Marquez's niece who is saved with a cure developed from the real Marquez's blood.
5	"Running Scared"	Rick Rosenthal	Mark Frost	August 24, 2001	2.02
Five female athletes, Jolene Martin, Sierra Wilson, Anna Markham, Belinda Karch, and Abigail "Gabby" Maine, have been undergoing experiments by Dr. Henry Lohman at the All Souls Sports Medicine Clinic. The first three die during the procedures. While trying to help Gabby, the doctors discover that Belinda has aged from twenty to over ninety. All five women are revealed to be Dr. Lohman's "daughters" from a genetic breeding experiment. The deaths were caused by an assistant giving the girls experimental DNA treatments without Lohman's knowledge.
6	"One Step Closer to Roger"	Stuart Gillard	Philip Levens	August 31, 2001	1.19
Barney Wheelock has a near-death experience and becomes possessed by a being known as "Roger". While under Roger's influence, he kidnaps nurse Kim Peretti before killing his wife Calvette and their two sons. Roger then takes control of Kim and attacks Dr. Bradley Sterling. Roger is revealed to be an old "god of the dead", and Grace protects Dr. Philomena Cullen from his attacks. At the end of the episode, the symbol used to represent Roger is shown to be the logo for the All Souls hospital.

== Broadcast history ==
All Souls was initially broadcast on Tuesday nights at 9 pm EST, and aired directly after the reality television show Chains of Love. The series carried a TV-PG parental rating, meaning it was judged "unsuitable for young children". It premiered on April 17, 2001, and was viewed by 2.1 million people; Nielsen Media Research ranked it 105th for the week. Scott Pierce of the Deseret News described the ratings for the first two episodes as "abysmal".

UPN placed the series on hiatus on April 30, 2001, due to concerns about its low ratings; only two episodes had aired. After announcing the show's hiatus, UPN executives said it was not canceled at that point. Despite the network's claims, media commentators believed it would be removed from air following its poor performance. The series returned in August and the pilot and remaining episodes aired on Friday nights at 9 pm EST, and were burned off throughout August. Overall, All Souls was broadcast for a total of 360 minutes.

While discussing the cancellation, McCouch felt it was "doomed to fail" from the beginning and referred to UPN as "a loser network at that time" due its treatment of the series. Cosgrove disagreed with McCouch's sentiment and believed the show's lack of success was not tied to the network specifically. Rodriquez believed All Souls was unsuccessful as it was "just a little ahead of its time"; he felt that the program was better suited for television one to two years following its initial broadcast. Pierce considered the show's cancellation as a sign of a larger issue with UPN, writing that "anything that's even slightly intelligent or ambitious" would not succeed on a network that also broadcasts WWE SmackDown. All Souls has never been released on DVD or Blu-ray, or licensed to an online-streaming service.

== Critical reception ==
All Souls has received positive critical feedback. Eric Mink of the New York Daily News praised the show's use of horror, and wrote that it would "set the dragging knuckles of UPN's core audience all a-tingle". The Los Angeles Times' Howard Rosenberg called the series "paranormal fun", and television critic Kevin McDonough referenced All Souls as "a classic Aaron Spelling production" primarily due to its editing and special effects. McDonough further described All Souls as "the best show you never watched", responding positively to the show's premise and actors. Mink responded positively to the series' storylines and characters, believing they had potential for further development.

Reception of the series' pilot was mixed, with television critics divided over its structure. Rob Owen of the Pittsburgh Post-Gazette gave the first episode a positive review, believing it set up enough story elements to show promise. Steven Oxman felt that the pilot made effective use of horror tropes, citing a scene in which a preserved fetus moves as a highlight. LA Weekly's Robert Lloyd had a more mixed response to the series; while he felt that the Grace's initial interactions with St. Clair gave away too much of the plot, he found it "well-made within the limits of its ambitions".

Critics had mixed reviews for All Souls, when compared to other horror and science-fiction narratives. Tim Goodman noted that All Souls had aspects of The X-Files as well as from The Twilight Zone, Stephen King's 1977 novel The Shining, and the medical drama genre. Even though Goodman felt the series had a "scattershot approach", he felt that all the elements worked with one another. Oxman was critical of the show's originality and its setting in a former asylum, saying it was similar to King's work and the 1996 film Extreme Measures, and felt it had "a superficial gloss" when compared to Twin Peaks. Despite this criticism, he called All Souls "potentially the scariest network show since The X-Files".
