= First Years =

American television series

- Genre: Legal drama
- Created by: Jill Gordon
- Based on: This Life by Amy Jenkins
- Written by: Jill Gordon; Mark B. Perry
- Directed by: Timothy Busfield; Tucker Gates; Tom Moore; Ken Topolsky; Scott Winant
- Starring: Mackenzie Astin; Ken Marino; Samantha Mathis; Sydney Tamiia Poitier; James Roday; Eric Schaeffer
- Composers: W. G. Snuffy Walden; Joseph Williams
- Country of origin: United States
- Original language: English
- No. of seasons: 1
- No. of episodes: 9 (6 unaired)

Production
- Executive producers: Jill Gordon; Mark B. Perry; Ken Topolsky
- Cinematography: John B. Aronson
- Camera setup: Single-camera
- Running time: 45 mins.
- Production companies: P.D. Oliver, Inc. NBC Studios; Studios USA Television

Original release
- Network: NBC
- Release: March 19 – April 2, 2001

Related
- This Life

First Years is an American legal drama that aired on NBC from March to April 2001. It is a remake of the British series This Life. The series premiered on March 19, 2001, but was canceled after only three of the nine episodes produced had aired.

== Overview ==
The series chronicles the lives of five young lawyers who live together in a house in San Francisco.

== Cast ==
=== Main ===
- Mackenzie Astin as Warren Harrison
- Ken Marino as Miles Lawton
- Samantha Mathis as Anna Weller
- Sydney Tamiia Poitier as Riley Kessler
- James Roday Rodriguez as Edgar "Egg" Ross
- Eric Schaeffer as Sam O'Donnell

=== Recurring ===
- Kevin Connolly as Joe
- Bruce Winant as Bruce

== Episodes ==
No.	Title	Directed by	Written by	Original release date	Prod. code
1	"The First Thing You Do..."	Scott Winant	Jill Gordon	March 19, 2001	E1902
2	"...And Then You Die"	Timothy Busfield	Mark B. Perry	March 26, 2001	E1903
3	"There's No Place Like Homo"	Timothy Busfield	Mark B. Perry	April 2, 2001	E1907
4	"Porn in the U.S.A." "First Day"	Tom Moore	TBD	Unaired	E1901
5	"Touched by a Reindeer"	Ken Topolsky	TBD	Unaired	E1904
6	"Lawyerboy"	Tucker Gates	TBD	Unaired	E1905
7	"When I Grow Up"	TBD	TBD	Unaired	E1906
8	"Habeas Corpse"	Ken Topolsky	TBD	Unaired	E1908
9	"This Life"	Timothy Busfield	TBD	Unaired	E1909

== Reception ==
Eric Mink of the New York Daily News critically panned the series, describing the lead characters as "collectively annoying".
