= Boot Camp (TV series) =

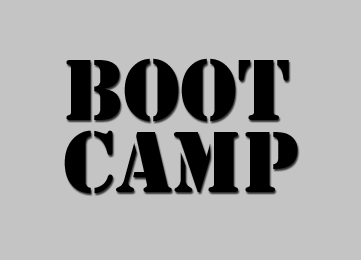
- Genre: Reality competition
- Directed by: Scott Messick; Chris Pechin
- Country of origin: United States
- Original language: English
- No. of seasons: 1
- No. of episodes: 9

Production
- Production locations: Starke, Florida, U.S.
- Running time: 42 minutes

Original release
- Network: Fox
- Release: March 28 – May 23, 2001

Related
- Celebrity Boot Camp

Boot Camp is an American reality competition television series that aired for one season on Fox starting March 28, 2001. The game was won by Jen Whitlow from Atlanta, Georgia.

== Format ==
The show involved sixteen civilian contestants, known as recruits, participating in a real life military style boot camp 24 hours a day. Four drill instructors put the recruits through special training activities and obstacle courses to prepare them for the "missions" which they took part in on each of the first seven episodes. Every week, the squad would elect one of their team as the "Squad Leader" giving this recruit extra responsibilities, most notably that of leading the squad in the weekly mission. If the mission was passed successfully, the squad leader earned immunity from the next elimination, and the squad would gain a luxury prize. If the mission was failed, the squad leader became eligible for dismissal, and the entire squad would receive a punishment.

At the end of each episode, the squad gathered on 'Dismissal Hill,' where players would exit the team. The squad would each vote one player out of the game, and the recruit with the most votes would be dismissed. However, in a second twist, that recruit got the ability to take any other eligible recruit out of the game for any reason. Contestants regularly adapted their voting strategies as a group in order to try to avoid being "discharged" by the recruit they chose to dismiss. Due to two earlier unplanned exits, two dismissed recruits lost the privilege to discharge another from the game. Upon elimination from the game, the Recruits lost their dog tags, symbolising their life in the game.

After seven episodes, only two contestants remained in the game - Recruits Whitlow and Wolf. The format of the show shifted with the final being referred to as "The Gauntlet". The Gauntlet consisted of seven physical and mental events, each named in honor of one of the seven dismissed recruits. The winner of each event won the dog tags of the former recruit that the event was named after. Following these seven events, the final two returned to Dismissal Hill where they faced the six (planned to be seven) discharged recruits, who were able to pledge their votes to the recruit of their choice. The recruit with the most dog tags after the combination of Gauntlet event wins and votes would win $500,000, with the runner-up receiving $100,000.

== Participants ==
There were sixteen participants in the game of Boot Camp, eight male and eight female. Participants were not allowed to be addressed by their first names at any point, and could not refer to themselves in the first person.

Name	Age	From	Occupation
Kasi Brown	26	Los Angeles, California	Actress
Katie Coddington	22	Tallahassee, Florida	Scholarship counselor
Rebecca Ann Haar	35	McDonough, Georgia	Pig farmer
Jodi Hutak	24	Santa Clarita, California	Deputy sheriff
Leigh Dana Jackson	28	Brooklyn, New York	Filmmaker
Jane Katherine	31	Chicago, Illinois	Leasing agent
Jack Lauder	50	Garnerville, New York	Plumber
Mark Meyer	27	Seattle, Washington	Urban planner
Alfonso Moretti	26	Wappingers Falls, New York	Personal trainer
Jennifer Moretty	29	San Diego, California	Homemaker
John Park	26	West Hollywood, California	Art teacher
Sue Yen Pupo	28	Philadelphia, Pennsylvania	Public defender
David Thomson	29	Las Vegas, Nevada	Real estate agent
Jen Whitlow	25	Atlanta, Georgia	Sales analyst
Ryan Wolf	22	Philadelphia, Pennsylvania	College student
Shawn Yaney	27	Elizabeth, New Jersey	Balloon sculptor

The recruits were trained by the following four genuine Drill Instructors:

Name	Status
Leo McSweeny	Former United States Marine Corps Sergeant
Tony Rosenbum	Marine Corps Chief Warrant Officer
Dave Francisco	Marine Corps Sergeant Major
Annette Taylor	Marine Corps Gunnery Sergeant

== The game ==
=== Episode 1 - "Meet the Recruits" ===
Sixteen civilians were taken by coach to a military training facility in Florida, and were quickly subjected to the four drill instructors' aggressive induction processing. After receiving haircuts more suitable for the military, the recruits were taken to their Barracks where they would sleep and eat for the rest of the process. Within five hours of arrival, Katherine was already having doubts about being in Boot Camp and after feigning illness, decided to quit the game. Meyer immediately became seen as a troublemaker, finding it hard to take the process seriously, and was soon disliked by most of the squad, but after encouragement from Thomson, prepared a damage limitation speech, apologizing and asking the others for a second chance over breakfast. Although many of the female recruits were convinced by the speech, the males were more skeptical. After a random selection process, Wolf was named as the first Squad Leader. On a 1.5-mile run, Haar's physical limitations became clear to the others, but despite a struggle she pushed through and completed the run. During the mission, the core group of strong males – Wolf, Moretti, Jackson and Park - upset Brown, who felt that they were treating the females as inferiors, and along with Meyer, she rallied the women to vote out Park in order to prevent themselves from being picked off by the stronger members of the squad. Park confronted Meyer, leading to the men agreeing to target him. At Dismissal Hill, the vote was close, but eventually Meyer and Brown's campaigning paid off, and Park became the first to be dismissed in a vote of 7-6-1-1. Due to Katherine leaving the game, Park was not given the chance to discharge any of the remaining members of the squad.

Mission: Operation Z.O.E: Recruits had four hours to carry inflatable boats known as zodiacs through a course of difficult terrain, including artificial obstacles and through a swamp. The squad would receive one hour extra sleep if they passed, and one less hour sleep if they failed. As squad leader, Wolf would gain immunity from elimination if he led the squad to victory. The squad completed the challenged in 2 hours 47 minutes, passing the mission.

=== Episode 2 - "Antidote" ===
Realizing that the men had made a mistake in making the women feel undermined, Moretti came up with the strategy of choosing a woman to become the next squad leader, with Recruit Hutak being chosen due to her clear enthusiasm for Boot Camp. During a period of free time, Brown shocked the rest of the squad by revealing that she is a lesbian, but some of the others wondered if she was simply trying to get attention by coming out to the group. Meyer meanwhile revealed his new strategy of making more of an effort and in a dramatic turnaround became perceived as one of the leading recruits. Due to her injury, Haar missed most of the training for the week's mission, leading to resentment from some of the squad, while Pupo and Thomson also found themselves facing trips to the medic, with Thomson experiencing numbness and swelling in his hands and feet, leading to the medic referring Thomson to a local facility for a second opinion. At the mission, Pupo and Haar were left behind at the drop off point because the squad felt they would be a hindrance, but Hutak's grasp on the mission fell apart, and the squad failed a mission for the first time. Pupo's bad attitude upset both the drill instructors and the rest of the squad and she became a clear target for elimination. At Dismissal Hill, Thomson returned to the game, and Recruit Haar was dismissed by a vote of 11-2-1 due to her lack of fitness and injury continuing to be a hindrance to the squad. Given the choice to take another recruit from the game, Haar chose to discharge Pupo, for her bad attitude and for not being a team player.

Mission: Operation M.E.S.S: The squad were given a scenario where they had one hour to infiltrate an enemy town to find an antidote for a poison from which they were all suffering. The squad had to work their way through a series of tunnels to find an unlocked exit at City Hall where serum, the first part of the antidote was hidden. From there, the squad would have to make their way to the medical facility to find the second part of the antidote, tablets, before mixing them with the serum to win the mission. The squad would receive a beach party in they passed the mission, plus immunity for Hutak, but would receive a punishment of an extreme physical workout if they failed. The squad were unable to finish the mission within an hour, and lost the mission.

=== Episode 3 - "MOTH and other Acronyms" ===
Upon his return, Thomson revealed to the squad that during his medical leave, he was told that the doctors were concerned that his mysterious problems were heart related. Moretti was elected as squad leader, and was forced to lead the squad through the most grueling workout yet, during which Thomson was sent back to the medics, with his condition worsening. During mission preparation, Meyer pretended to faint so he could take a break in the extreme heat, while Moretti accidentally hit Brown in the face, leading to her also having to take lengthy time-out. Moretti however wondered about the legitimacy of Brown's sickness due to her profession as an actress, leading to a distrust between the pair. Wolf's cocky behavior saw a target form on his back, but he revealed a secret alliance with Whitlow, who he hoped would be able to gain favor for him amongst the women. The whole squad became emotional upon receiving their immunity items, and Hutak informed the other recruits of her sister's recent death. At the medical center, Thomson was informed that the doctors were seriously concerned for his health and safety, and in an emotional ceremony he was medically discharged from the game. Later, Wolf learned that Meyer and the women were targeting him, and pulled Meyer aside, leading to a heated confrontation between the pair, during which Meyer implicated Brown as the ringleader behind the move. Wolf proceeded to confront Brown, but the other women backed her claims that Meyer was the ringleader, and Brown and Wolf agreed to let the matter drop. Later, Meyer's betrayal of Brown became a major point of discussion for the women, who were concerned that Meyer was too unpredictable to be considered a safe ally. Wolf proceeded to create further panic amongst the women by informing Whitlow that he would only discharge a female recruit should he be voted out, and at Dismissal Hill, his threat paid off, with Meyer being dismissed by unanimous vote.

Mission: Operation M.O.T.H: The squad had one hour to find and repair a jeep, and use it to evacuate three supply crates, and four dummies representing casualties from a mock conflict. If the squad successfully completed the mission, they would receive one item from personal items confiscated for them during induction. If they failed, they would not receive the item, and instead would receive a difficult workout. The squad passed the mission with 29 seconds to spare.

=== Episode 4 - "Yaney Gets His Chance" ===
The morning after Meyer's dismissal, the remaining recruits were given the opportunity to select their new squad leader, and after Whitlow, Jackson and Brown refused the role, hoping to remain under the radar, Yaney was pushed into the role, despite the consensus that he was one of the weakest recruits. The physical toughness of Boot Camp began to wear Lauder down, with the age difference between him and the rest of the squad beginning to show. The squad were next taught how to rappel down a building, an experience which proved hardest for Coddington, causing D.I. McSweeney to question her suitability for Boot Camp. In the male barracks, the men speculated about Brown's influence amongst the women, and knowing that if they voted to dismiss her she would take out a man, they made a pact to discharge her should any of them be dismissed, though later Moretti revealed that in reality, that the men planned to vote out Lauder specifically for this purpose. Lauder meanwhile spoke to Hutak, and made it be known that he was open to voting with the women, should the situation benefit him. At the mission, the squad were successful, but Coddington soon found her ankles and feet were swelling, similar to Thomson and she was escorted to the medics. The following day, it became apparent that during the mission, a harness was left behind, and destroyed in the tunnel, leading to the squad being severely punished. Although Yaney returned without a harness, Brown claimed to have seen Wolf take Yaney's harness, and after initially taking the blame himself, Yaney eventually told the drill instructors that Wolf was to blame, leading to Wolf becoming unpopular amongst the squad, as he continued to maintain his innocence while letting everyone be punished. In reality, the harness left in the tunnel belonged to Moretty, who had put it down upon arrival and left the tunnel with Wolf's harness. Wolf left the tunnel with Yaney's harness, while Yaney left the tunnel without one. At Dismissal Hill, the female recruits ignored Lauder's offer to vote with them, and joined the men in voting him out of the game by a vote of 8-1-1. Despite earlier agreeing to discharge Brown should he be dismissed, Lauder instead opted to discharge Hutak, who he felt was bossy and pushy, a trait he did not like in women.

Mission: Operation R.A.D: The squad had 45 minute to infiltrate enemy territory to rescue dummies representing casualties, before rappelling down the side of a building to detonate an enemy watch tower through a series of tunnels. The squad would receive a serving of their favorite food should they win the mission, and squad leader Yaney would be immune. However, if they failed, the squad would only be allowed to eat basic ready to eat meals, and Yaney would be eligible for elimination at Dismissal Hill. The squad passed the mission, and won the reward.

=== Episode 5 - "The Saddest Episode Ever" ===
After losing their ally Hutak, the female recruits continued to plot against Wolf. After resisting from taking the role several times, Jackson finally became the squad leader. During a workout session, D.I. McSweeney accused Moretty of making faces at his orders, causing her to start screaming back at him. Later, Moretty was taken aside by D.I. Taylor who helped Moretty calm down by talking to Moretty about her family and by addressing her by her first name. Next, the recruits tackled a difficult obstacle course, resulting in an ankle injury for Whitlow, which earned resentment from Brown and Moretty who were tired of seeing people take time off through injury. After failing their mission, the squad faced a night from hell, with their work-out finishing at 3.30am. The next morning, in spite their mutual dislike for each other, Brown and Wolf called a truce and agreed to vote out an injured recruit, feeling they did not deserve to stay around after doing lighter work-loads than the others, with Whitlow seeming to be their main target. Coddington meanwhile campaigned to eliminate Yaney, in spite of their close friendship, as he had implied he was running out of energy. At Dismissal Hill, the squad voted to dismiss Coddington in a vote of 6-1-1, as she had spent the most time out injured. Upon being given the opportunity to address her squad, Coddington thanked the other recruits and Drill Instructors for everything she had learned about herself from them, but also took the opportunity to insult D.I. McSweeney, stating that she had learned nothing from him other than that she had a dislike for people who spit in her face when speaking to her. In spite of the females' belief that she would take the opportunity to discharge Wolf, she instead decided to discharge Yaney, as she believed that was what the squad would have wanted.

Mission: Operation R.E.B.E.L: Recruits had one hour to cross a rope obstacle course without touching the ground. Upon reaching the other side, the squad had to travel up a river, before using only three boards to link planks of wood and cross a minefield. If the recruits touched the ground at any point during this stage of the mission, they earned a minute's penalty. If the recruits passed the mission squad leader Jackson would be immune from elimination, and the squad would earn a night at the movies in the recreation room. If they failed, Jackson would not be immune, and the squad would earn a late night punishment regime in the pit. Recruits failed the mission, after earning six minutes in penalties in the final stage of the mission.

=== Episode 6 - "Twists and Turns" ===
The squad gathered to decide their next squad leader, and with Whitlow continuing her under the radar strategy, the choice came down to Brown and Moretty. Despite Brown acknowledging it was risky for her not to take the role, she eventually gave it to Moretty, frustrating Jackson, who felt that Moretty was not a natural leader. The recruits were next taken for water survival training, and after experiencing the icy water, Jackson refused to get back in when ordered to, surprising the squad, as he had been a leading recruit from the start. Later, Brown campaigned against Jackson, but Whitlow was unsure and approached Moretty about voting for Brown. Despite forming a strong friendship with Brown, Moretty conceded that getting rid of her would be a smart move, and agreed to go along with Whitlow's plan. At the male barracks, Jackson targeted Whitlow, feeling that she could not be trusted. During the challenge, Jackson once again riled the squad by undermining Moretty and trying to take over. Later, Wolf informed Brown about the females plot against her, causing Brown to confront the women. After initially lying, Moretty informed Brown that she had plotted against her, but Brown convinced her to go back to their original plan, and after speaking to Whitlow, the three women agreed to reunite, with Brown believing if Jackson was sent home he would discharge Whitlow. Meanwhile, the men agreed to vote for Whitlow, but Moretti was unhappy about the move, and after speaking to Moretty considered joining the female group. At Dismissal Hill, Moretti did just that, going back on his promise to Jackson, who was dismissed by a 4-1-1 vote. Jackson was given the chance to discharge one of the remaining recruits, and despite her earlier belief that Jackson would take out Whitlow, Brown was discharged, as Jackson wanted to look out for the men, and felt they had a better chance against a still-injured Whitlow.

Mission: Operation H.E.L.L: The recruits' objective was to rescue an artificial hostage from an enemy compound within 1 hour 30 minutes. Recruits had to find a way to climb onto the roof of the building, before crossing without detection. Once across the bridge, recruits would have to work their way through a laser labyrinth individually, with time penalties if a laser was broken. Once through the labyrinth, the recruits had to free the artificial hostage and carry it to the roof, before zip-lining back to the ground on the other side of compound for a final sprint to the finishing line. The reward was 1 hour in a Jacuzzi hot-tub, the punishment was an hour in a "Cold hot-tub". Recruits passed the mission with 1 minute 22 seconds to spare, earning amnesty for squad leader Moretty.

=== Episode 7 - "Final Four" ===
Having betrayed Jackson, Moretti was overcome by a sense of guilt and Wolf felt he could no longer trust his long-term ally. With just four recruits left, the drill instructors turned up the pressure on the squad, and revealed that the mess hall was now closed, and recruits would have just three ready-to-eat meals to ration until the next elimination. With everyone else having already held the role, Whitlow became the squad leader by default, and although everyone denied they would be doing so, paranoia rose around the barracks as to whether everyone would try to win the mission, aware that if they won, Whitlow would be guaranteed a berth in the Gauntlet. The recruits were taken for night-time navigation training, and all were given worms from the ground to eat, much to the horror of Wolf in particular. Following their mission success, the recruits were taken to the Ritz Carlton hotel, but upon arriving in their suite, were disappointed to find the drill instructors there, and they were informed that they would not be supplied with any extra food, leading to Wolf and Moretti feeling like they were being punished instead of rewarded. In the morning however, the squad were surprised with an elaborate breakfast spread. Back at the barracks, the positive atmosphere was destroyed when it was discovered that a complimentary mint chocolate had been taken from the hotel against the drill instructors' orders, and after a search, it was discovered amongst Whitlow's possessions, earning the squad a lengthy punishment. Later, the recruits discussed who would face Whitlow in the Gauntlet, and once again Wolf became the target, but he revealed he had faith in his long-term alliance with Whitlow and admitted he had felt closest to her throughout the game. Shortly before heading to Dismissal Hill, the recruits were presented with a flag which the squad buried to represent their time spent at the barracks. At Dismissal Hill, Wolf being dodged a bullet, and Moretti was dismissed by a vote of 3–1. Left with the choice of the two recruits closest to him, an emotional Moretti chose to discharge Moretty, feeling Wolf was more deserving. Recruits Wolf and Whitlow were congratulated for making the final two, before being informed that the Gauntlet would begin immediately.

Mission: Operation H.E.R.O: In the final and most complex mission, the squad had two hours to work their way through five miles of hostile territory in total darkness, first having to make a sandbag bridge over a designated area without touching the ground. Next, the recruits had to rappel down a steep ravine, before crossing a designated area using sand rails, again not being allowed to touch the ground. Finally, the squad had to find a large military installation not identifiable on their map, and once there, had to locate four glow-sticks. The prize for winning the mission was immunity for Whitlow and a guaranteed place in the Gauntlet, and a night in the Ritz Carlton hotel. Punishment for failure would see Whitlow eligible for elimination, and a night spent sleeping in the dirt outside the barracks. Recruits passed the mission successfully with one minute and three seconds to spare.

=== Episode 8 - "The Gauntlet Part 1" ===
Episode 8 took place on Day 29, and the early hours of Day 30 of the competition – the first day of the Gauntlet. Immediately following the departure of Recruits Moretti and Moretty, Whitlow and Wolf were informed that they would immediately be beginning the Gauntlet, a series of seven physical and mental events over a 48-hour period. Recruits would not have the opportunity to sleep or eat throughout the Gauntlet. Each of the seven events was named in memory of one of the seven recruits, with the event winner earning that recruit's dog-tags. The first recruit to earn seven sets of dog-tags was to be the winner of Boot Camp.

Lauder's Last Stand: Recruits were presented with podiums on Dismissal Hill, and whichever recruit could remain there the longest would win the event. After five hours and forty minutes of facing off, Recruit Whitlow stepped down from the podium, giving victory and Lauder's dog-tags to Recruit Wolf.

Coddington's Crossing: Recruits were to run a lengthy obstacle course over sand, with obstacles including a mud-pit, a wooden wall, and a final obstacle of kayaking over a lake to the finishing line. Although the recruits originally believed they were involved in a direct race, upon conclusion they learned that in reality, they would be re-running the course later in the Gauntlet, with the recruit who improved on their first time the most winning Coddington's dog-tags. Wolf finished the course in 12 minutes and 42 seconds, while Whitlow finished in 15 minutes and 18 seconds.

Haar's Heartbreak: Recruits were to repeat the 1.5-mile run they had originally run on the second day of Boot Camp. Whichever recruit could improve on their Day 2 time by the most would win Haar's dog-tags. Wolf originally posted a time of 10.05, and posted a new time of 8.55, improving by 1 minute and 10 seconds. Whitlow posted an original time of 12.40, and posted a new time of 10.58, improving by 1 minute 42 seconds, - 32 seconds more than Wolf. Although Whitlow received Haar's dog-tags, neither recruit was informed of the result until the final visit to Dismissal Hill.

Park's Peak: Recruits were to climb to the top of a tower, and had to rappel halfway down the tower where they would find a memorable quote. Recruits had to memorize the quotes perfectly, and repeat them on a white-board at the bottom of the tower. If they made any mistakes in the quote, they would have to return to the top, and keep trying until they had the quote correct, before moving onto a second, and a third quote. The first quote was by George Patton, the second by John F. Kennedy, and the third by former Recruit, Shawn Yaney. The event was won by Wolf, who completed the whole event in 12.08, while Whitlow recorded an overall time of 34.53, though once again, the recruits were not informed of their times until Dismissal Hill. Wolf only took one attempt to correctly repeat Kennedy's quote, and had already completed the event by the time it had taken Whitlow to complete the first quote.

Moretti's Memory: In the early hours of the morning, the recruits were shown a series of images, and after being given a moment to study them, were asked a brief question about something they should have seen in the slide. The winner was the recruit who answered the most questions correctly. Wolf only answered 5/18 questions correctly, but this was still better than Whitlow's 3/18, so he won Moretti's dog-tags. Neither recruit learned their scores until Dismissal Hill.

By the conclusion of the episode, the finalists had gone 48 hours without sleep, leading to Whitlow in particular becoming delirious and struggling to keep her head in the game. Shortly before the next event, Whitlow and Wolf both pondered which of the six discharged recruits would vote for them, while the former recruits returned to the barracks, and discussed the pros and cons of both of the finalists, though in the end, Brown and Moretty both concluded that it ultimately came down to what was worse – being a "weasel" like Wolf, or being a "weasel in disguise" like Whitlow. At the end of the penultimate episode, Wolf unknowingly held a 3–1 lead over Whitlow.

=== Episode 9 - "The Gauntlet Part 2" ===
The season finale of Boot Camp all took place on Day 30, the final day at Boot Camp, and the second day of the Gauntlet. It contained the remaining three Gauntlet events, before the final visit to Dismissal Hill, where the six discharged recruits returned to pledge their dog-tags to one of the two finalists. The first recruit to gain seven sets of dog-tags would be the winner of Boot Camp.

Meyer's March: Recruits were both given a bag that weighed 20% of their individual body weight, before being set out in different directions on a ten-mile round course. Recruits could choose whether they wanted to run, jog or walk the course, and would pass each other only once. Wolf completed the course in 2 hours, 4 minutes and 31 seconds while Whitlow took 2 hours 13 minutes and 4 seconds, meaning that Wolf earned Meyer's dog-tags, and a 4-1 overall lead over Whitlow. The recruits were again not informed of the result until Dismissal Hill.

Jackson's Hold: Recruits were each presented with a set of dog-tags, and had to hold them with their wrist within a metal ring over a tank of blood. Recruits lost the task if they touched the metal ring, or if their set of dog-tags touched the blood. After 21 minutes and 22 seconds, Whitlow concluded that due to Wolf's superior upper body strength, she would have little chance of winning the event, and instead chose to preserve her energy for the tasks to come.

Back at the barracks, the former recruits again debated about which way they would be voting at Dismissal Hill later that evening, with Recruit Hutak reflecting upon the harness incident during Week 4, and how Wolf had let the squad take the blame. Heading into the final Gauntlet event – the second attempt at Coddington's Crossing, Whitlow and Wolf had both gone 58 hours without sleep, and Wolf led the Gauntlet by a score of 5–1.

Coddington's Crossing Part 2: In the final Gauntlet event, the recruits had to run the obstacle course for a second time, with the recruit who improved on their first time by the most earning Coddington's dog-tags. Although Whitlow was originally on course to win the event, she became stuck at the wall obstacle. Over an hour later, and after making 47 attempts, Whitlow finally managed to cross the wall, with the entire team of Drill Instructors supporting her, and she moved on to complete the course, with a total time of 1 hour and 27 minutes. Wolf improved on his original time by 28 seconds, winning Coddington's dog-tags.

64 hours after last sleeping, Recruits Whitlow and Wolf were taken to Dismissal Hill where they were reunited with the discharged recruits – Pupo, Thomson, Hutak, Yaney, Brown and Moretty, who each were called forward to cast their votes for a winner in secret. Before their votes were revealed, the discharged recruits were brought up to date with the results of the events of which Whitlow and Wolf already knew the outcome, before the results of the other four events were revealed for the first time. Following the recap, Wolf held a 6–1 lead over Whitlow, requiring just one more set of dog-tags to win Boot Camp.

The discharged recruits were called back to the podium, where they were told to reveal for whom they had cast their vote. Moretty voted for Whitlow, stating that although Wolf was the stronger recruit, she felt that Whitlow had tried harder and had consistently performed to the best of her ability. Next, Hutak also voted for Whitlow, stating that due to Wolf's failure to speak up and stop the squad from being punished during the missing harness incident in Week 4, she felt he did not deserve to win. Brown was next to vote, and she openly admitted she struggled to back either finalist, as she had never liked or trusted Whitlow, and had found Wolf to be overconfident and cocky. In the end however, Brown voted for Whitlow, as when she was discharged from the game, she had stumbled across the rules for Boot Camp in her belongings, and within them, one of the most important rules stated that recruits should never look out for themselves over the benefit of the team, something which Wolf consistently did. Next, Thomson took to the podium, and despite liking both of the finalists, voted similarly to Moretty, choosing Whitlow who had consistently tried harder. Pupo claimed that she had not been in the game long enough to form real opinions on the final two, and despite Wolf's previous hope that them both coming from Philadelphia would have earned him Pupo's vote, she instead claimed to have flipped a coin, that landed in favour of Whitlow. With twelve of the thirteen dog-tags accounted for, the dog-tag count had been levelled at six apiece, with only Yaney's left unaccounted for. Wolf had previously hoped that bunking next to each other for most of the game would earn him Yaney's vote through camaraderie, but in the end, the harness incident cost him another crucial vote, and due to Wolf's failure to be a team player, Yaney pledged his dog-tags to Whitlow, who in a surprise triumph was named the winner of Boot Camp, winning $500,000. After the final, Wolf speculated that Brown had rallied the discharged recruits against him, bitter at being taken from the game, but in the end concluded he was still pleased to have won the second place prize of $100,000. D.I. Francisco ordered all of the non-winning recruits from Dismissal Hill, leaving Whitlow standing alone as the winner.

== Voting history ==
	Episode 1	Episode 2	Episode 3	Episode 4	Episode 5	Episode 6	Episode 7	The Gauntlet		Votes
Squad; Leader:	Wolf	Hutak	Moretti	Yaney	Jackson	Moretty	Whitlow	None		
Whitlow	Meyer	Haar	Meyer	Lauder	Coddington	Jackson	Moretti	Winner $500,000		2
Wolf	Meyer	Haar	Meyer	Lauder	Coddington	Moretti	Moretti	Runner Up $100,000		1
Moretty	Park	Haar	Meyer	Lauder	Coddington	Jackson	Moretti	Discharged; Episode 7	Whitlow	2
Moretti	Meyer	Haar	Meyer	Lauder	Coddington	Jackson	Moretty	Dismissed; Episode 7	Wolf	4
Moretti	Meyer	Haar	Meyer	Lauder	Coddington	Jackson	Moretty	Dismissed; Episode 7	Wolf	4
Brown	Park	Haar	Meyer	Lauder	Coddington	Jackson	Discharged; Episode 6		Whitlow	2
Jackson	Meyer	Haar	Meyer	Lauder	Coddington	Whitlow	Dismissed; Episode 6		Wolf	6
Jackson	Meyer	Haar	Meyer	Lauder	Coddington	Brown	Dismissed; Episode 6		Wolf	6
Yaney	Jackson	Pupo	Meyer	Whitlow	Brown	Discharged; Episode 5			Whitlow	2
Coddington	Park	Haar	Meyer	Lauder	Yaney	Dismissed; Episode 5			Wolf	6
Coddington	Park	Haar	Meyer	Lauder	Yaney	Dismissed; Episode 5			Wolf	6
Hutak	Park	Haar	Meyer	Lauder	Discharged; Episode 4				Whitlow	2
Lauder	Meyer	Haar	Meyer	Jackson	Dismissed; Episode 4				Wolf	8
Lauder	Meyer	Haar	Meyer	Hutak	Dismissed; Episode 4				Wolf	8
Meyer	Park	Haar	Wolf	Dismissed; Episode 3					Wolf	15
Thomson	Park	Hutak	Medically Discharged; Episode 3						Whitlow	0
Pupo	Park	Haar	Discharged; Episode 2						Whitlow	4
Haar	Pupo	Pupo	Dismissed; Episode 2						Whitlow	11
Haar	Pupo	Pupo	Dismissed; Episode 2						Whitlow	11
Park	Meyer	Dismissed; Episode 1							Wolf	8
Katherine	Quit; Episode 1									N/A

The Recruit won Boot Camp and $500,000
The recruit was the runner-up, and won $100,000
The contestant was a normal member of the squad, and was eligible to be voted out at Dismissal Hill.
The contestant was Squad leader in this episode, and passed the weekly mission, earning personal immunity from being voted out.
The contestant was Squad leader in this episode, and failed the weekly mission, becoming eligible to be voted out.
The contestant received the most votes at Dismissal Hill, and was dismissed, but was able to discharge the eligible recruit of his or her choice.
Having previously been discharged, the recruit was eligible to cast a vote for who she or he wanted to win at the final Dismissal Hill.
Having previously been dismissed, the recruit could not cast a vote for who she or he wanted to win, but his or her dog tags were won in a Gauntlet event
The recruit had previously been eliminated from the game, and was not present in this episode
There was no Dismissal Hill or votes cast in this episode, as the Gauntlet was in progress.

== Controversy ==
The show drew a lawsuit from Mark Burnett due to similarity to his reality show Survivor.
