= Welcome to New York (TV series) =

American sitcom television series

- Genre: Sitcom
- Created by: Barbara Wallace; Thomas R. Wolfe
- Starring: Christine Baranski; Jim Gaffigan; Sara Gilbert; Rocky Carroll; Mary Birdsong; Anthony DeSando
- Country of origin: United States
- Original language: English
- No. of seasons: 1
- No. of episodes: 16 (3 unaired)

Production
- Executive producers: Barbara Wallace; Thomas R. Wolfe; Christine Baranski; Eric Gilliland
- Producers: Barry Katz; Lisa Loosemore; Jim Gaffigan
- Running time: 30 minutes
- Production companies: Worldwide Pants Incorporated; Crazy Canyon Productions; CBS Productions; Studios USA Television

Original release
- Network: CBS
- Release: October 11, 2000 – January 17, 2001

Welcome to New York is an American sitcom television series created by Barbara Wallace and Thomas R. Wolfe, that was produced by Worldwide Pants Incorporated, Crazy Canyon Productions, CBS Productions and Studios USA Television and aired on CBS. The show premiered October 11, 2000, and aired until January 17, 2001.

== Premise and History ==
The show starred Jim Gaffigan, who played a weatherman from Fort Wayne, Indiana, who then moved to New York City and worked as a meteorologist for a fictional morning news show called "AM New York". Christine Baranski played Marsha Bickner, the larger-than-life, tightly wound producer of "AM New York" who hired Jim, but tends to forget the details about his life – like where he moved from. CBS canceled the show due to low ratings. Looking back, Gaffigan said, "I don’t think I had the maturity to take the authority I should have", and as he was not a contributing writer he felt the team would dismiss his ideas.

== Cast ==
- Jim Gaffigan as Jim Gaffigan
- Christine Baranski as Marsha Bickner
- Anthony DeSando as Vince Verbena
- Mary Birdsong as Connie
- Sara Gilbert as Amy Manning
- Rocky Carroll as Adrian Spencer

== Episodes ==
No.	Title	Directed by	Written by	Original release date	Prod. code
1	"Pilot"	Will Mackenzie	Barbara Wallace & Thomas R. Wolfe	October 11, 2000	E1701
2	"Tickets"	Will Mackenzie	Justin Adler	October 18, 2000	E1703
3	"Jim Gets an Apartment"	Will Mackenzie	Barbara Wallace & Thomas R. Wolfe	October 25, 2000	E1706
4	"Jim Gets a Wig"	Will Mackenzie	Liz Astrof & Leslie Snyder	November 1, 2000	E1702
5	"The Car"	Will Mackenzie	Barbara Wallace & Thomas R. Wolfe & Eric Gilliland	November 8, 2000	E1712
6	"The Crier"	Will Mackenzie	Gigi McCreery & Perry Rein	November 15, 2000	E1704
7	"Dr. Bob"	Will Mackenzie	Rich Kaplan	November 22, 2000	E1705
8	"It's Hard to Meet Intelligent Women"	Will Mackenzie	Liz Astrof & Leslie Snyder	November 29, 2000	E1711
9	"Limos and Lines"	Will Mackenzie	Justin Adler	December 13, 2000	E1708
10	"The Cat and the Rat"	Will Mackenzie	Eric Gilliland & Thomas R. Wolfe	January 3, 2001	E1713
11	"The Memo"	Will Mazkenzie	Gigi McCreery & Perry Rein	January 10, 2001	E1714
12	"The Stalker"	Will Mackenzie	Rich Kaplan	January 15, 2001	E1710
13	"The Brother"	Will Mackenzie	Justin Adler	January 17, 2001	E1716
14	"The Party"	TBD	TBD	Unaired	E1715
15	"Dusting Diva"	TBD	TBD	Unaired	E1717
16	"The Perks"	TBD	TBD	Unaired	E1718

== Reviews ==
The Pittsburgh Post-Gazette found the show to be "smart, telling comedy, but it's also an acquired taste."
