= Manhunt (2001 TV series) =

American reality television series

- Genre: Reality competition
- Country of origin: United States
- Original language: English
- No. of seasons: 1
- No. of episodes: 6

Production
- Running time: 43 minutes
- Production company: Paramount Television

Original release
- Network: UPN
- Release: August 3 – September 7, 2001

Manhunt is an American reality television series that aired on UPN from August 3 to September 7, 2001.

The contestants on the show posed as fugitives who tried to escape actors who pretended to be bounty hunters. The one who eluded the bounty hunters the longest would receive a cash prize.

Manhunt encountered multiple problems during its brief run. Vince McMahon of the World Wrestling Federation (whose program SmackDown! aired on the same network) backed out of producing the show despite originally being heavily involved in its development and marketing. Later, separate investigative reports by Peter Lance and game-show enthusiast Steve Beverly revealed that portions of the show were being filmed at Griffith Park in Los Angeles, California, rather than entirely on location in Hawaii, as the producers were not satisfied with the original material. Allegations were also made that Paramount Television had convinced a producer to rig the show in favor of a particular contestant, which violated FCC regulations put in place following the 1950s quiz show scandals.

The program ended after six episodes.

John Cena (then a WWE developmental talent) and former American Gladiator Raye "Zap" Hollitt were among the cast members.
