= History of UPN =

History of the defunct American broadcast television network

In 1995, Viacom and Chris-Craft Industries' United Television launched United Paramount Network (UPN) with Star Trek: Voyager as its flagship series, fulfilling Barry Diller's plan for a Paramount network when he ran Paramount in the mid-1970s. In 1999, Viacom bought out United Television's interests, and handed responsibility for the start-up network to the newly acquired CBS unit, which Viacom bought in 1999 – an ironic confluence of events as Paramount had once invested in CBS, and Viacom had once been the syndication arm of CBS as well. During this period the studio acquired some 30 television stations to support the UPN network as well acquiring and merging in the assets of Republic Pictures, Spelling Television and Viacom Television, almost doubling the size of the studio's television library.

Lasting eleven years before being merged with The WB network to become The CW in 2006, UPN would feature many of the shows it originally produced for other networks, and would take numerous gambles on series such as Star Trek: Voyager and Star Trek: Enterprise that would have otherwise either gone direct-to-cable or become first-run syndication to independent stations across the country (as Star Trek: Deep Space Nine and Star Trek: The Next Generation were).

== 1990s ==
The original incarnation of Viacom purchased Paramount in 1993, with the deal closing in March 1994; Viacom then merged its own group of five CBS- and NBC-affiliated stations to the PSG fold. Shortly afterward Viacom entered into a joint venture with Chris-Craft Industries, which owned several television stations as part of its United Television subsidiary, to launch the United Paramount Network (UPN). Five of PSG's original six stations, along with several acquisitions such as WSBK-TV in Boston, became charter affiliates of the network when UPN launched in January 1995. PSG sold off two of its original six stations as well; KRRT and WTXF were sold to other companies, with the latter becoming a Fox-owned station. To make up for the loss of its Philadelphia-owned station, PSG bought Philadelphia independent station WGBS-TV and renamed it to WPSG-TV, and moved the UPN affiliation there. The company eventually divested itself of the CBS and NBC stations it held and purchased more UPN affiliates as the 1990s continued.

=== 1995 ===
This was the first season to feature the UPN and The WB, as both launched in January 1995. Both networks would ultimately shutdown and form The CW in September 2006. In January 1995, BHC Communications affiliated all of its stations, except the Salt Lake City and San Antonio outlets, with the newly launched UPN, which it fully owned and financed but ran with Paramount/Viacom, the network's producer. In December 1996, Paramount exercised its option to buy half of the network by paying half of the losses ($160 million). Included in the deal was to continue selling UPN Star Trek: Voyager instead of placing it in syndication.

When WWOR, channel 9 in New York City became a UPN affiliate in 1995, the WWOR EMI Service also covered up the network's shows, due to Paramount (although the network's sole owner-turned-half owner Chris-Craft owned the station) using syndication exclusivity to keep UPN's shows off the national WWOR feed—in contrast, rival superstation WGN carried programming from The WB on its national feed until nationwide terrestrial coverage was deemed sufficient to discontinue its carriage over the national WGN feed in October 1999. As a result of the syndication exclusivity claims by UPN, if New York City viewers of WWOR saw Star Trek: Voyager, cable viewers throughout the rest of the country saw Hazel reruns in the same timeslot.

- Star Trek: Voyager originally aired from January 1995 to May 2001, lasting for 172 episodes over seven seasons. As Star Trek: The Next Generation ended, Paramount Pictures wanted to continue to have a second Star Trek television series to accompany Star Trek: Deep Space Nine. The studio also planned to start a new television network, and wanted the new series to help it succeed. This was reminiscent of Paramount's earlier plans to launch its own network by showcasing Star Trek: Phase II in 1977.
- Platypus Man aired from January 23 to July 10, 1995, during the network's first season. Starring comedian Richard Jeni, the television series was based on an hour-long HBO special of Jeni's filmed in 1992. The series lasted one season, with a total of thirteen episodes.
- Pig Sty premiered on January 23 and was cancelled after just 13 episodes on May 15, 1995. Pig Sty ran on Monday nights, after Star Trek: Voyager and Platypus Man.
- Legend ran from April 18, 1995, until August 22, 1995, with one final re-airing of the pilot on July 3, 1996. Twelve episodes were aired, including the 2-hour pilot episode. Despite critical praise, the show was canceled along with almost every other program aired on the UPN lineup.
- Marker premiered on January 17 and ended on May 16, 1995.
- The Watcher premiered on January 17, 1995 and ended on June 7, 1995, during the network's inaugural season. The series aired Tuesday night at 9:00 p.m. Eastern time. The Watcher was one of five series that aired on UPN during its first year, joining other drama series Star Trek: Voyager and Marker and the sitcoms Pig Sty and Platypus Man. Like the latter three series, it was canceled following its one and only season.

=== 1996 ===
This is the first fall season for The WB and UPN. The schedules of either network would not be constant until fall 1999, when the WB decided to air shows from Sunday through Friday and UPN would air Monday through Friday.

- In the House aired on NBC from April 1995 to May 1996 after which it was canceled due to low ratings. UPN quickly picked up In the House where it aired for an additional two seasons. UPN canceled the series for a final time in May 1998.
- Nowhere Man aired every Monday night from August 28, 1995, to May 20, 1996, starring Bruce Greenwood. Despite critical acclaim, including TV Guide's label of "This season's coolest hit," the show was cancelled after one season.
- Deadly Games appeared from September 5, 1995, to July 17, 1997, as part of its 1995 season. The series was produced by Viacom Productions. Much was made that Leonard Nimoy was executive producer, creative consultant and directed the pilot.
- Live Shot aired from August 29, 1995, to January 9, 1996. Most notable in the show's run was an early use of an ongoing story arc centering on the murder of a Los Angeles socialite. As the show was canceled with little warning, the story arc was never resolved. Also, sports reporter Lou Waller came out of the closet in the last act of the last episode to air. Consequently, the fallout of this event was never shown.
- Moesha aired from January 23, 1996, to May 14, 2001. It was originally ordered as a pilot for CBS' 1995–1996 television season but was rejected by the network. It was then picked up by UPN, which aired it as a mid-season replacement. It went on to become the biggest success for the nascent network and one of the greatest hits over the course of the network's entire run. By the sixth season, ratings for Moesha had dropped and UPN opted not to renew or air the series for a seventh season. The series ended on an unresolved cliffhanger with Myles being kidnapped by a rival of Dorian, Moesha considering moving in with Hakeem, and an unknown positive pregnancy test being found in the trash at Moesha's dorm room. Entertainment Weekly put out a rumour that certain plots were to be resolved on The Parkers, but those plans never came through, and the storylines were ultimately never resolved.
- Minor Adjustments aired on NBC from September 16, 1995, until November 26, 1995, and on UPN from January 23, 1996, until June 4, 1996.
- The Sentinel aired from March 20, 1996, to May 24, 1999. The Sentinel was canceled after 3 seasons by UPN, with the last episode being a big cliffhanger with Blair's life in the balance. An intense fan campaign convinced UPN to give the series a season of eight episodes to end the series properly.
- Swift Justice for one season from March 13 to July 17, 1996. Critics noted Swift Justice's emphasis on violence, specifically in the pilot episode's opening sequence, comparing it to the crime drama The Equalizer (1985–1989) and the 1988 film Die Hard. UPN canceled the program after receiving complaints from viewers, advertisers, and critics of its violent scenes. Wolf considered the cancellation a mistake due to the show's good ratings. The series was praised for its visuals and McCaffrey's performance, but criticized as being either too violent or formulaic. Swift Justice was part of UPN's "aggressive new spring schedule" that expanded the network's programming to three nights per week. Picked up as a mid-season replacement, the series was broadcast on Wednesday nights at 9:00 pm EST. Thirteen episodes aired between March and July 1996. Rocky Mountain News' Dusty Saunders cited the series as an example of the network shifting toward action-adventure programming. Mediaweek's Scotty Dupree wrote that Swift Justice and The Sentinel were meant to attract a male audience, saying they were the only shows, aside from JAG, marketed to men on Wednesday nights. Wolf specified the target audiences of males as being aged 18 to 34. Swift Justice's pilot episode was shown with a viewer advisory regarding its violence. During the show's broadcast, watchdog organizations and viewers were critical of the representation of violence on television. UPN canceled Swift Justice, Nowhere Man, Minor Adjustments, and The Paranormal Borderline, in favor of black sitcoms. The network decided to remove Swift Justice from its schedule following viewer and advertiser complaints about its violence. During a 2013 interview with the Academy of Television Arts & Sciences, Dick Wolf referred to the decision to end Swift Justice as a "cancellation error", particularly since UPN did not have a drama with comparable ratings at the time. Following the show's cancellation, when Wolf was casting for the television productions Players and Exiled: A Law & Order Movie in the late 1990s, he again hired Ice-T, who has noted that Wolf often collaborated with the same actors.

=== 1997 ===
- Malcolm & Eddie premiered August 26, 1996, on UPN, and ran for four seasons, airing its final episode on May 22, 2000.
- Goode Behavior premiered August 26, 1996, on UPN. The series was cancelled after one season, airing its last episode on May 19, 1997, for a total of 22 episodes.
- Sparks aired from August 26, 1996, to March 2, 1998. The series stars James Avery, Robin Givens, Terrence Howard, Miguel A. Núñez Jr., Kym Whitley and Arif S. Kinchen. The sitcom is set in Compton, California, and is about the everyday lives of a family of lawyers running a family-owned law practice.
- Homeboys in Outer Space aired from August 27, 1996, to May 13, 1997. The series was panned by critics and was canceled by UPN after one season. The series was later featured on TV Guide's List of the 50 Worst TV Shows of All Time. Significant criticism was levied towards the contrived pop culture references and celebrity cameos, and the NAACP criticized the ethnic stereotypes being played for laughs.
- Social Studies aired from March 18 to April 22, 1997.
- The Burning Zone aired for one season from September 3, 1996, to May 20, 1997. Critical response to The Burning Zone was primarily negative; commentators were divided over its storylines and tone. It received comparisons to other science-fiction properties, especially The X-Files. One of six shows ordered by UPN, The Burning Zone was the network's only new drama for the 1996–97 television season. It was the final program announced as a part of UPN's 1996-97 line-up. The Burning Zone was broadcast on Tuesday nights at 9 pm EST, airing with the sitcoms Moesha and Homeboys in Outer Space. UPN included references to The X-Files in the promotional materials for the show. In a University of California, Los Angeles report, senior fellow Harlan Lebo wrote that The Burning Zone is one of two shows, along with The Sentinel, in the 1996–97 television season that received complaints for its use of violence. The network canceled The Burning Zone, and rescheduled Tuesday nights with four additional sitcoms, including Clueless.

=== 1998 ===
In January 1998, United Television acquired a third UHF station in Baltimore for $80 million, changed its call letters to WUTB, and made the station a UPN affiliate. United, in October 1997, agreed to purchase WRBW (channel 65), a UHF station and UPN affiliate in Orlando, Florida, for $60 million and possible further considerations (WRBW was later acquired by Fox Television Stations after the BHC-News Corp. merger, and is now a MyNetworkTV owned-and-operated station). In April 1998, United took a minority stake in Bohbot Entertainment & Media.

- Good News aired from August 25, 1997, to May 19, 1998. It is also the final television series to be produced by MTM Enterprises, before it was folded into 20th Century Fox Television.
- Love Boat: The Next Wave aired from April 13, 1998, to May 21, 1999. It was a revival of the original 1977–1986 ABC television series The Love Boat. A reunion-themed episode reunited several cast members of the original The Love Boat – Gavin MacLeod (Captain Stubing), Bernie Kopell (Dr. Adam "Doc" Bricker), Ted Lange (Isaac Washington), Jill Whelan (Vicki Stubing) and Lauren Tewes (Julie McCoy). This episode revealed that Julie and "Doc" had been in love all along.
- Clueless originally premiered on ABC on September 20, 1996, as a part of the TGIF lineup during its first season. The show then spent its last two seasons on UPN ending on May 25, 1999. After the series was canceled by ABC, the reruns of the episodes on their Friday night TGIF line-up proved to be ratings winners for ABC. However, it was too late for ABC to get the series back, and they prevented UPN from broadcasting the series until their contract ran out in late September. Clueless finished #46 in the ratings with 13.3 million viewers. Only Sabrina the Teenage Witch (a show on which Elisa Donovan and David Lascher would eventually become regulars) had higher ratings for Friday. Reportedly, the star of Sabrina, Melissa Joan Hart, was considered for the part of Cher on the Clueless television series. UPN cancelled the show after the third season (1998–1999), reportedly because of sharply declining viewership. By the final season, the show had retained only 30% of its original 1996 viewing audience.
- Hitz aired from August 26 until November 11, 1997. Although UPN had initially ordered 13 episodes, by October the network had ordered nine more episodes for a total of 22. However, by December the series was canceled before production on the last six episodes was complete. Caryn James of The New York Times called the series "relentlessly unfunny". Ken Tucker of Entertainment Weekly rated the series as one of the worst of the year.
- Head over Heels aired on from August 26 to October 28, 1997. The sitcom was the lowest-performing series tracked by Nielsen Holdings for the 1997–1998 television season. Since UPN primarily marketed its programming to African-American audiences, critics questioned the show's lack of a black main character. With its inclusion of Ian, Head Over Heels was one of 30 U.S. programs to feature a gay, lesbian or bisexual character that television season. It received a negative response from commentators, who criticized its sex comedy and characters. During production, Connie Stevens was set to play the Baldwins' mother in a recurring role. A writer for Turner Classic Movies described the show as "resurrect[ing] [Stevens'] acting career". Although UPN had ordered Head Over Heels due to Stevens, the network removed her from the project following what it described as "a creative change". In the series' original pilot episode, the mother is the dating agency's original owner who passes it on to her sons. A "cavorting bimbo of a mother", she has a relationship with a Hispanic personal trainer and frequently talks about having sex with him. References to the dating company's history and the Baldwins' involvement were removed from the series. For the second version of the pilot, LaRue was added to the show after her character (Maria Santos) was removed from the soap opera All My Children. UPN ordered three new sitcoms for the 1997–1998 television season: Head Over Heels, Hitz, and Good News. They were part of the network's decision to expand its prime-time schedule to four nights a week. Although UPN targeted its programming at African-American audiences, Head Over Heels does not feature a black actor. Network president Dean Valentine denied accusations from "industry observers" that he was "abandoning the black audience or turning down projects featuring black stars and producers". Airing after Hitz, Head Over Heels was broadcast on Tuesdays at 9:30 pm EST; it was originally scheduled for 8:30 pm. The series had a TV-PG parental rating for suggestive language and sexual situations; the Deseret News' Scott Pierce felt that it should have received a TV-14 rating for its sexual content. The series attracted a weekly average of 2.3 million viewers It tied with Alright Already as the lowest-performing show (tracked by Nielsen Holdings) of the season. The overall viewing figures for both shows was 2.7 million viewers. Head Over Heels was the first casualty of the 1997–1998 season. Although 13 episodes were ordered, only eight were broadcast. Despite reports that the series would air through November, its final episode was shown on October 28, 1997. Dobson and Whitfield appeared in all eight episodes, Bristow appeared in seven, and Ambuehl and LaRue appeared in four.

=== 1999 ===
In 1999, Viacom announced plans to merge with CBS Corporation. Because of a regulation upheld by the FCC years ago, prohibiting companies from owning two broadcast networks. Viacom's announcement raised questions regarding the future of Chris-Craft and Viacom's joint ownership of UPN. In Viacom and Chris-Craft's original agreement, two options for exiting the partnership had been determined—buying out the other partner or paying for what the partner had invested up to that date and providing funds for the future operation of UPN. Either option would cost Viacom substantial sums of money. Industry analysts agreed that Chris-Craft could emerge the winner and offered other possible scenarios—that Viacom might offer Chris-Craft some of its stations in exchange for severing the partnership or that Chris-Craft might sell Viacom's share to another company.

However, after the Viacom-CBS merger was completed in 2000, a lawsuit was filed by BHC against the Viacom-CBS merger as BHC saw this as a breach of the UPN partnership. BHC lost the suit and sold its remaining ownership in UPN to Viacom for $5 million. Shortly thereafter, Chris-Craft announced that it was getting out of broadcasting after losing $500 million on UPN, the possibility of UPN shutting down or having their affiliation pulled. Many industry observers thought Viacom would end up getting the stations, but Viacom's bid lost out to News Corporation's Fox Television Stations, resulting in a sale which closed on July 31, 2001.

- Guys Like Us aired from October 5, 1998, to January 18, 1999. Due to low ratings, UPN cancelled the show after its first season.
- DiResta premiered on October 5, 1998, on its Monday schedule. It was cancelled after its March 1, 1999, airing. The show was named for stand-up comedian John DiResta; this was his first television venture. The series was described by Entertainment Weekly as "A transit cop, his funny job, and his funny family." On the week of November 2–8, 1998, was the lowest rated non-PAX network show aired.
- The Secret Diary of Desmond Pfeiffer aired from October 5–28, 1998. Before it was even debuted, the series set off a storm of controversy because of a perceived light-hearted take on the issue of American slavery. Before the series' premiere, several African American activist groups, including the Los Angeles area NAACP, protested against the premise of the series. On September 24, 1998, a protest against the series was held outside Paramount Studios. Five days later, UPN released a statement regarding the controversy and stated that the network planned on delaying the controversial pilot episode (which never aired) and would instead air an alternate episode in its place. The first episode of the series aired on October 5, 1998, ranking 116th out of 125 television programs for that week. Desmond Pfeiffer was removed from UPN's schedule on October 24 and, after airing one episode two days after being removed from UPN's lineup, was canceled. It was ranked #5 on Entertainment Weekly's Top 50 TV Bombs.
- The first episode of Dilbert was broadcast on January 25, 1999, and was UPN's highest-rated comedy series premiere at that point in the network's history; it lasted two seasons with thirty episodes on UPN and won a Primetime Emmy before its cancellation. Scott Adams, the creator of Dilbert, decided to create the series for UPN because the network promised 13 episodes on air, while other networks would only consider the series against other programming options. Adams added to that "If we had gone with NBC, they would have given Dilbert a love interest with sexual tension." UPN was the sixth-ranked network at the time and picked up the show in hopes of broadening their appeal and to prove they were committed to riskier alternative shows. Adams stated about turning Dilbert into a series "It's a very freeing experience because doing the comic strip limits me to three (picture) panels with four lines or less of dialogue per issue, in the TV series, I have 21 minutes per episode to be funny. I can follow a theme from beginning to end, which will add lots of richness to the characters." Adams wanted the series to be animated because the live action version shot previously for FOX didn't translate well. Adams added to that "If Dilbert's going to be at the top of the Alps, you just draw it that way and you don't have to build an Alps scene. You can also violate some laws of physics, and cause and effect. People forgive it very easily. So it's much more freeing creatively." On November 22, 2006, when Adams was asked why the show was canceled, he explained:

It was on UPN, a network that few people watch. And because of some management screw-ups between the first and second seasons the time slot kept changing and we lost our viewers. We were also scheduled to follow the worst TV show ever made: Shasta McNasty. On TV, your viewership is 75% determined by how many people watched the show before yours. That killed us.

- Home Movies premiered on April 26, 1999. UPN cancelled the series after only five episodes due to low ratings, but Cartoon Network purchased the rights to the series, seeing potential in it; the show premiered as the first original program on their nighttime adult-oriented Adult Swim block on the night of the block's launch on September 2, 2001. The series ended on April 4, 2004, with a total of 52 episodes over the course of four seasons.
- Power Play aired on CTV from 1998 to 2000. The series was filmed at Copps Coliseum (now FirstOntario Centre) in Hamilton, Ontario. The show was briefly aired on the United States broadcast network UPN, starting in 1999, but was pulled after just two episodes. The second episode aired in the United States has the distinction of being the lowest-rated episode (since the Nielsen ratings service began in the 1950s) of any prime-time TV series ever aired by any United States network.
- Seven Days was produced from October 7, 1998, to May 29, 2001. Three seasons of Seven Days were produced. Seven Days was based on an idea from Kerry McCluggage, then-president of Paramount Television. He pitched the idea to Christopher Crowe, who mixed it with his own research on Area 51 to create the series. The show wasn't a hit with reviewers, who criticized the show's "flimsy" premise and violence. Justina Vail, who played Dr. Olga Vukavitch, quit the series before the end of the third season, though she agreed to film a few extra scenes to wrap-up her character's arc. Her departure and the tensions within the cast, as well as the show's low ratings, played a role in UPN's decision to not renew the series for a fourth season.
- Between Brothers premiered on September 11, 1997, on Fox, with the second season airing on UPN, until March 2, 1999.
- Mercy Point originally aired for one season from October 6, 1998, to July 15, 1999. According to a press release from UPN, the series features the characters' attempts to "balance complicated personal lives with the demands of working in a cutting-edge hospital". During production, Trey Callaway imagined the series as a "companion piece" to Star Trek: Voyager, with the hope that it would have a shared viewership. Even though elements of "Nightingale One" were kept, Callaway said that "[he] really started over again and reconceived it completely as a series from the ground up". Prior to the series being officially green-lit, Callaway collaborated with writer David Simkins to prepare a presentation of a "low-budgeted 30 minute" pilot. Simkins did not work on the series after his pilot, but his contributions earned him a credit as one of its co-creators. John de Lancie, who was noted for acting as Q in Star Trek: The Next Generation, had essayed the role of DeMilla, and Steve Johnson designed the non-humanoid aliens. The pilot presentation was filmed in Los Angeles, but the sets were completely renovated for the series' episodes. Three non-humanoid characters, including ANI and Batung, were added to the show following this presentation. UPN executives responded positively to the presentation, and ordered thirteen episodes of the series, which was considered a "half-season's worth". Mercy Point was one of four shows produced by Mandalay Television that appeared in the 1998–99 United States television schedule, alongside Cupid, Rude Awakening, and Oh Baby. The show's production was part of a $3 million deal with Columbia TriStar Television to produce 200 hours of material; a majority of the content created from this agreement was commercially unsuccessful. Mercy Point was placed on hiatus after only three episodes were aired, and was replaced by the reality television series America's Greatest Pets and the sitcom Reunited. The show suffered from low ratings, with an average of two million viewers. The final four episodes of the series were broadcast in two 2-hour blocks on Thursday nights in July 1999. Critical response to Mercy Point was mixed; some commentators praised its characterization and use of science-fiction elements, while others found it to be uninteresting and unoriginal. Callaway said he was surprised by UPN's cancellation of Mercy Point because of their strong support of the show. He felt the decision was made in part because of the show's high production costs. He also concluded that the decision to broadcast the pilot at the same time as the World Series resulted in the loss of Mercy Point's target audience. To better connect with UPN's teen viewers, Callaway shifted the show's focus from medical and ethical cases to the characters' relationships. Despite these revisions, he said that UPN executives preferred to air shows like Moesha over science-fiction programs. When UPN announced the show's cancellation, the eighth episode was in the middle of production. Scenes originally written for the episode were revised and edited into the seventh episode to form a complete series finale.
- Reunited aired from October 27 until December 29, 1998. At the time, it was one of the lowest-rated programs ever tabulated, with an average 0.9 Nielsen rating, which meant around 885,000 viewers watched it every week.
- Family Rules aired from March 9, 1999, to April 13, 1999.
- Legacy aired for eighteen episodes from 1998 to 1999.
- The Parkers aired from August 30, 1999, to May 10, 2004. Given her popularity for four seasons on Moesha, Countess Vaughn left the show for her own spin-off. It centered on the adventures of Kim attending community college with her mother, played by comedian Mo'Nique. Leaving Moesha, Yvette Wilson joined the cast of The Parkers as Andell Wilkerson, Nikki's childhood best friend, in 2000. Several Moesha cast members (including Brandy Norwood) made crossover appearances on The Parkers. Though not direct spin-offs of Moesha, the shows Girlfriends and The Game were created by Moesha writer Mara Brock Akil and exist in the same universe as Moesha. The character Maya Wilkes (Golden Brooks) from Girlfriends lives in Leimert Park like the characters of Moesha, and appeared in an episode babysitting for her sister-in-law Barbara Lee, who happened to be Dorian's birth mother. Niecy later appeared in an episode of Girlfriends.
- Grown Ups premiered on August 1, 1999, at 8:30 EST/7:30 CST. On August 30, 1999, the series moved to Mondays at 9 p.m. EST/8 p.m. CST, following the Moesha spin-off The Parkers. The series initially garnered good ratings, but ratings soon dropped and UPN canceled the series (on a cliffhanger that was never resolved) in May 2000.
- Shasta McNasty aired during the 1999–2000 season. A sneak preview of the series after UPN's highly rated WWF SmackDown! drew 4.52 million viewers. However, when the series was moved to its scheduled 8 p.m. timeslot, ratings dropped. Halfway through the first season, UPN shortened the show's title to Shasta, and the series was canceled after its first season. Although Shasta McNasty premiered with less-than-favorable reviews from critics, the program was nominated for a People's Choice Award for best new comedy.
- The Strip aired from October 12, 1999, to July 7, 2000, during the 1999–2000 television season. The series was cancelled after nine episodes, with a tenth episode airing months later in July 2000.

== 2000s ==
=== 2000 ===
During the late 1990s, UPN produced a number of television films branded "Blockbuster Shockwave Cinema," in conjunction with sponsor (and sister company) Blockbuster Video. Almost all were science fiction films, and likewise, their after-airing availability on home video was exclusive to Blockbuster stores. From UPN's inception until 2000, the network also offered a hosted movie series called the UPN Movie Trailer to their stations. The show featured mostly older Hollywood action and comedy films, often those made by Paramount Pictures. Movie Trailer was discontinued in 2000 to give stations that opted for them room for a second weekend run of Star Trek: Enterprise and America's Next Top Model (and later, Veronica Mars). There were also three Paramount-branded blocks on the company's owned-and-operated stations ("O&Os") only: Paramount Teleplex as the main brand for movies at any given timeslot, Paramount Prime Movie for primetime features, and the Paramount Late Movie on late nights.

- I Dare You: The Ultimate Challenge aired from January 17, 2000, to May 30, 2000.
- Secret Agent Man aired from March 7, 2000, to July 28, 2000. Secret Agent Man was originally scheduled to premiere on UPN in September 1999, but was pushed back to a midseason premiere in August 2000 due to the desire to give the show's producers more time to work on props and special effects. It also did not have a traditional one-hour pilot filmed, and was instead ordered to series by UPN on the strength of just a presentation reel. Only 12 episodes were produced and broadcast before the series was cancelled due to poor ratings.
- The Beat premiered on March 21, 2000, and ended after only six episodes a month later on April 25. Seven additional episodes were produced although they have never aired.
- WWF SmackDown! was set up to compete against WCW's Thursday night show, Thunder. SmackDown! first appeared on April 29, 1999, using the Raw set as a single television special on UPN. On August 26, 1999, SmackDown! officially debuted on UPN. Like WCW Thunder, SmackDown! was recorded on Tuesdays and then broadcast on Thursdays. The new WWF show was so popular that WCW moved Thunder to Wednesdays so that it would not compete directly. Throughout the show's early existence, The Rock routinely called SmackDown! "his show", in reference to the fact that the name was derived from one of his catchphrases, "Lay the smack down". In March 2002, WWF implemented the "brand extension", under which Raw and SmackDown! would have separate rosters of performers that are exclusive to their respective programs and events, and be positioned in-universe as competing "brands" (in a manner reminiscent of athletic conferences). In the 2004–05 season, SmackDown! had an average viewership of 5.1 million viewers, making it UPN's second-highest-rated series behind America's Next Top Model. With the cancellation of Star Trek: Enterprise, SmackDown! moved into its former timeslot on Friday nights for the 2005–06 season, beginning September 9, 2005. WWE subsequently announced that the show would be renamed Friday Night SmackDown! to emphasize the new scheduling.

=== 2001 ===
- The Hughleys spent two seasons on ABC. In its first season, it followed Home Improvement, but was canceled when ABC decided to revamp its TGIF lineup. UPN picked up the show in the fall of 2000 and it aired in the Monday night lineup along Moesha, The Parkers and Girlfriends. While The Parkers and Girlfriends had improved ratings, The Hughleys aired its series finale after its fourth season. The Hughleys ended with a two-part series finale entitled "It's a Girl!" (aired on May 13 and May 20, 2002).
- Girlfriends debuted on Monday September 11, 2000. After airing for several years on the network at 9/8C on Mondays, The CW moved Girlfriends to Sundays at 8/7C. The ratings plummeted. On October 9, 2006, Girlfriends, along with The CW's other African-American programs, moved back to Mondays. At this point, Girlfriends returned to its original time slot. While UPN was still airing new episodes of Girlfriends, the network also began airing reruns five days per week. When the show moved to The CW network after UPN merged with The WB network, MyNetwork TV (which was created to take over UPN's former affiliate stations) picked up the rights to air reruns of Girlfriends, although they eventually discontinued this. WE tv, a network with primarily women's programming, later acquired exclusive rights to air the limited-release episodes on Sundays and exercised an option to not allow broadcast television networks re-broadcast rights to these reruns. The final two episodes recorded before the 2007–08 Writers Guild of America strike aired back-to-back on Monday, February 11 at 9/8c. However, this was not a 2-part episode. The timeslot was planned to be moved to Sundays due to the writer's strike and the returning of The CW's reality series. On February 13, 2008, it was announced by a The CW representative that a proper series finale would not be done because it would be too expensive, also confirming the show's cancellation. A retrospective episode was to be aired on The CW Network to conclude the eight-year series. However, the characters' storylines would receive no resolutions as the retrospective/series finale did not come to pass. The network offered the actors only half of their usual episodic salary to take part, and the actors collectively turned them down.
- Freedom aired from October 27 to December 22, 2000. There were 13 episodes filmed, including the original pilot, but only 7 episodes were aired in the United States.
- Chains of Love aired for six episodes in April–May 2001. Chains of Love was originally ordered by NBC, before UPN began producing it. The program was produced as part of a campaign to have more unscripted programming in UPN's schedule to boost the network's ratings. UPN executives associated the rise in interest in unscripted content as connected to its low production costs compared to scripted programming and its appeal to a younger demographic. Network president Dean Valentine explained: From a societal view, audiences, especially young people, are finding it harder and harder to relate to fictional storytelling – it just seems fake to them.The network's entertainment chief Tom Nunan said the series was intended to improve the network's ratings, explaining: "There's a wave of television viewer right now that is very clear to us – it shows that audiences seem to be responding to these event programs that don't feel like cookie-cutter TV." Media outlets have identified Chains of Love as part of a renaissance in reality television. Before its premiere, UPN had promoted the series through a month-long online campaign aimed at young women. Initially broadcast on Tuesday nights at 8:00 pm EST, the network envisioned the show as a companion piece to the simulated fugitive-chase series Manhunt. Media outlets questioned whether the show's airing on network television had restricted its content. Critical feedback to Chains of Love was mixed, the show's premise dividing television critics. Its structure and tone were compared to other programs where contestants seek love partners, such as Blind Date and The Dating Game. Chains of Love was one of three series that debuted on UPN during the 2000–01 US television schedule as a mid-season replacement; the other two were Special Unit 2 and All Souls. Chains of Love was broadcast initially on Tuesday nights at 8:00 pm EST, premiering on April 17, 2001. UPN picked it up originally as a companion piece to the 2001 Manhunt, in which pretend fugitives ran away from actors posing as bounty hunters. During its broadcast, Chains of Love was briefly paired with All Souls, which UPN placed on a hiatus after two episodes were aired. Before the show's debut, the network had conducted a month-long online promotional campaign. The advertisements, specifically aimed at women from the ages of 12 to 34 years old, appeared on the websites Targetmatch.com, Madhive.com, and Ecrush.com. The Marina del Rey-based marketing firm L90, who had previously done work for UPN for the series Gary & Mike, created the campaign. Lauren Kay, the company's vice president of marketing, said that for the show they put together a "clean simple branding program" using pop-up ads, flash animation, and a sweepstake done through a microsite. Media outlets questioned whether the show's broadcast on network television had a limited impact on its more mature content. Carman identified a scene as confusing in which the Picker suggested skinny-dipping in a hot tub to the four women, followed by a shot of them appearing in swimsuits. Peyser equated the sexual content with that of Dawson's Creek, and wrote that it was not as explicit as he had first imagined.
- All Souls originally aired for one season on UPN from April 17, 2001, to August 31, 2001. UPN executives had pitched the series as following "young doctors in peril at a haunted old Boston Hospital" who must contend with "a healthy dose of terrifying paranormal occurrences and gripping medical emergencies". The series had originated from a production deal between Syfy and CBS Paramount Network Television. Thomas Vitale, the senior vice president of programming and original movies for Syfy, described the partnership as a way to add more "genre programming to our schedule". It was one of three series (alongside Chains of Love and Special Unit 2) UPN ordered as mid-season replacements during the 2000–2001 television season. The network had requested six episodes of All Souls when picking it up for air, and all of them had been shot before its cancellation. The Seattle Post-Intelligencer's John Levesque felt that the network decided to produce All Souls in an attempt to find another successful series following the end of Star Trek: Voyager. While Levesque thought the shows were "promising", he did not believe any of them were a "slam-dunk". All Souls had low viewership, and was placed on hiatus following the broadcast of the first two episodes and canceled after the season was broadcast. Critical response to All Souls was primarily positive; commentators praised its use of horror and paranormal elements. All Souls was initially broadcast on Tuesday nights at 9 pm EST, and aired directly after the reality television show Chains of Love. The series carried a TV-PG parental rating, meaning it was judged "unsuitable for young children". It premiered on April 17, 2001, and was viewed by 2.1 million people; Nielsen Media Research ranked it 105th for the week. UPN placed the series on hiatus on April 30, 2001, due to concerns about its low ratings; only two episodes had aired. After announcing the show's hiatus, UPN executives said it was not canceled at that point. Despite the network's claims, media commentators believed it would be removed from air following its poor performance. The series returned in August and the pilot and remaining episodes aired on Friday nights at 9 pm EST, and were burned off throughout August, with the last one airing on August 31, 2001. One rerun aired during the month of September. Overall, All Souls was broadcast for a total of 360 minutes. While discussing the cancellation, McCouch felt it was "doomed to fail" from the beginning and referred to UPN as "a loser network at that time" due its treatment of the series. Cosgrove disagreed with McCouch's sentiment and believed the show's lack of success was not tied to the network specifically. Rodriquez believed All Souls was unsuccessful as it was "just a little ahead of its time"; he felt that the program was better suited for television one to two years following its initial broadcast. The series has never been released on DVD or Blu-ray, or licensed to on an online-streaming service. Critics had mixed reviews for the show's content and style when compared to other horror and science-fiction television series, specifically The X-Files and the work of American writer Stephen King.
- Special Unit 2 is an American sci-fi/comedy television series that aired on UPN for two seasons from April 11, 2001, through February 13, 2002.
- Gary & Mike aired on UPN in 2001 and Comedy Central in 2003. The show was produced in stop motion clay animation and lasted only one season. A total of thirteen episodes were produced. The series was initially proposed to Fox, but was eventually passed over to UPN. UPN had aired the episodes out of order, leading to inconsistencies within the plot serialization (save for the production placement of the third and fourth episodes). Although the final episode included a "to be continued" message, the show was canceled after its first season. According to co-creator Adam Small, 10 more episodes were planned for the second season. The cancellation was actually a result of the financial issues UPN was facing at the time rather than a ratings issue.
- Two television pilots of Celebrity Deathmatch were broadcast on MTV on January 1 and 25, 1998. The series proper premiered on May 14, 1998, and ended on June 6, 2002, airing for 75 episodes. A television special, Celebrity Deathmatch Hits Germany, aired on June 21, 2001. For a brief period during that year, reruns of the series aired on broadcast network UPN.
- One on One aired from September 3, 2001, to May 15, 2006. The show was originally pitched to ABC when the pilot was shot in 1999. Unfortunately, due to the fact that ABC’s sitcom audiences declining, they decided not to move forward with the project so Flex and the creator of the show, Eunetta pitched One on One to The WB but since the network rebranded, the show was not fitting in due to it not being “teen enough” and that is why the WB network passed on the show as well, so in 2000, the show was pitched to Fox considering that Fox Television Studios was the original distributor but they ended up passing on the show. Not long after ABC, The WB and Fox all passed on One on One, UPN executives took interest in the show considering their ties to Fox and because the Moesha cancellation worked out in the favor of One on One, UPN picked it up. The series was a joint production of the Greenblatt/Janollari Studio and Daddy's Girl Productions in association with Paramount Network Television. However, the show was not originally a Paramount production. In fact, the show was originally owned by Fox Television Studios but last minute, they ended up dropping out due to One on One not fitting in with the financial model.. The show was cancelled months before The WB and UPN merged to form The CW. The show had a spin-off series Cuts, which follows Flex's little brother Kevin Barnes running the local barbershop/day spa with a spoiled brat named Tiffany Sherwood after her father Jack Sherwood purchased the shop. The show premiered as a mid-season replacement during the 2004–2005 television season. The show lasted for only two seasons and was also canceled when UPN and The WB merged to form The CW.
- Buffy the Vampire Slayer first aired on March 10, 1997, (as a mid season replacement for the show Savannah) on the WB network, and played a key role in the growth of the Warner Bros. television network in its early years. In the 2001–2002 season, the show had moved to UPN after a negotiation dispute with The WB. While it was still one of the highest rated shows on their network, The WB felt that the show had already peaked and was not worth giving a salary increase to the cast and crew. UPN on the other hand had strong faith in the series and picked it up for a two-season renewal. UPN dedicated a two-hour premiere to the series to help re-launch it. The relaunching had an effect, as the season premiere attracted the second highest rating of the series, with 7.7 million viewers. Buffy helped put The WB on the ratings map, but by the time the series landed on UPN in 2001, viewing figures had fallen. The series' high came during the third season, with 5.3 million viewers (including repeats). This was probably due to the fact that both Sarah Michelle Gellar and Alyson Hannigan had hit movies out during the season (Cruel Intentions and American Pie respectively). The series' low was in season one at 3.7 million. The show's series finale "Chosen" pulled in a season high of 4.9 million viewers on the UPN network.
- Roswell premiered on October 6, 1999, on The WB in the United States to generally favorable reviews, and it quickly gained an outspoken fanbase. In response to the problems the series had with ratings during its first season, the relationship-driven stand-alone episodes of the early first season were to be replaced with more science fiction themes and multi-episode plot arcs. Starting with the second season, after a fierce fan-driven campaign involving bottles of Tabasco sauce—a favorite condiment of the show's alien characters—being sent to the network's offices, veteran science fiction writer Ronald D. Moore was brought in to join Katims as an executive producer and showrunner and to further develop the science fiction elements of the show. Not all fans responded favorably to the shift to more science fiction-driven storylines during the second season and the ratings continued to disappoint, causing the network to finally cancel the show on May 15, 2001, after the show's second-season finale, a move widely anticipated due to the sagging ratings. 20th Century Fox (the studio that produced the show) was able to persuade UPN to pick it up for a third season as a package deal when UPN outbid The WB for one of its popular flagship series, Buffy the Vampire Slayer. During the 2001 - 2002 television season, Roswell, in its third season, aired directly after Buffy on Tuesday nights on UPN, though it was unable to hold on to the audience Buffy provided as a lead-in. This eventually resulted in the show's cancellation from UPN as well.
- As If aired for two weeks, on March 5 and 12, 2002. It served as a midseason replacement for Roswell and aired on Tuesdays after Buffy the Vampire Slayer. The series was a part of the network's Tuesday evening 9 p.m. ET/PT timeslot, which outside of a couple exceptions, was terminally troubled due to The WB and Fox's much better ratings on the evening. Seven episodes were produced, but due to low ratings, As If only aired twice before its cancelation.
- The Random Years aired on from March 5 to 19, 2002. The show, developed under the working title Life as We Know It, was produced by Big Phone Productions in association with Paramount Television. It was shown as a mid-season replacement, alongside the comedy drama As If, to fill the timeslot previously occupied by the science fiction television show Roswell. The Random Years was commercially unsuccessful, and was canceled after three weeks. Seven episodes were produced, but only four aired. Critical response to the series was mixed, though some critics had positive comments about the cast. In January 2002, UPN organized panels on its then-upcoming programs, which involved their writers and cast members. The Random Years was one of the shows discussed. Television executive Les Moonves said the programs were scheduled for spring and summer releases. Premiering alongside the comedy drama As If, The Random Years was broadcast on Tuesday nights at 9 pm EST; the pilot episode was watched by 1.4 million viewers. The series had a TV-14 parental rating, indicating that it was "unsuitable for children under 14 years of age". UPN aired As If and The Random Years as mid-season replacements to occupy the timeslot previously filled by science fiction television show Roswell. The Random Years was one of the lowest-performing shows tracked by Nielsen Holdings, and it was canceled after three weeks. Seven episodes were filmed, though only four were aired.
- Star Trek: Enterprise originally aired from September 26, 2001, to May 13, 2005, spanning 98 episodes across four seasons. Following the culmination of Star Trek: Deep Space Nine and with Star Trek: Voyager scheduled to end, UPN asked Braga and Berman to devise a new series to continue the franchise. Rather than setting it in the 24th century alongside Deep Space Nine and Voyager, the duo decided to set Enterprise in an earlier period, allowing them to explore new parts of the Star Trek fictional universe. Prior to the end of Star Trek: Voyager and following the end of Star Trek: Deep Space Nine in June 1999, UPN approached Rick Berman and Brannon Braga about the production of a fifth Star Trek series, either to overlap with the final season of Voyager or to immediately follow. Berman had previously created Star Trek: Deep Space Nine alongside Michael Piller, Voyager with Piller and Jeri Taylor, and had been wanting to work with Braga on a series concept. While the fans online were suggesting that it could either be based on Starfleet Academy or the adventures of Hikaru Sulu, the producers took care that no information was leaked to reveal what the concept was going to be. They later revealed that the Academy idea was never properly considered. Instead, they opted to create a prequel to The Original Series which is set after the events in the film Star Trek: First Contact, as Braga and Berman felt it was a period in the Star Trek universe which was unexplored. Midway through the third season, from "Exile" onwards, the series started to be broadcast in 1080i High-definition television. Alongside Jake 2.0, it was one of the first two series on UPN to be broadcast in high-definition. The show contains over 4,214 minutes of special effects, dialogue, and other scenes. The series was considered for cancellation at the end of the second season, with Paramount executives instead requesting a number of changes to Enterprise in order to renew it following a letter writing campaign from fans. These included a change of name to Star Trek: Enterprise early in the third season and a new action-oriented plot, which resulted in the development of the Xindi. There was a major turn over of staff at Paramount in June 2004, with Jonathan Dolgen, the head of entertainment at parent company Viacom, quitting following the departure of Viacom President Mel Karmazin. Dolgen was described by Bakula as being the "huge Star Trek guy" at Paramount, and his departure was followed by several other staff members leaving. Fans were resigned to cancellation at the end of the third season, but were surprised when the series was renewed, which was due in part to a reduction in the fees Paramount was charging UPN on a per-episode basis. However Enterprise was moved to a slot on Friday evening, the same night on which The Original Series was broadcast during its own third season before it was cancelled. On February 3, 2005, it was announced that Enterprise had been cancelled. This news was passed to the cast and crew during the sixth day of production on "In a Mirror, Darkly". The end of the series marked the first time in 18 years that no new Star Trek episodes were scheduled for broadcast, and Enterprise was the first live-action series of the franchise since The Original Series to last less than seven years. Braga said at a talk to students in Los Angeles shortly after the news of the cancellation was released that "After 18 straight years on the air and 750-some episodes the current run of Star Trek is over. Which is a good thing. It needs a rest". He added that he was not sure how long Star Trek would be off the air, but called it a "gestation" instead of a "cancellation". Russell T Davies, showrunner of the then-upcoming revived series of Doctor Who, was in talks about producing a crossover episode in which the Ninth Doctor lands the TARDIS on board the NX-01, but these plans were abandoned with the cancellation of Enterprise. The cancellation resulted in protests by fans, both at Paramount Studios and around the world as well as online. A website entitled TrekUnited.com was set up to raise funds for a fifth season, but failed to do so with the money refunded after the unsuccessful campaign. A total of $32 million had been raised. Several years later, the possibility of a fifth season was still being discussed with Braga suggesting that fans could prompt Netflix into producing a new season of Enterprise by watching the existing four seasons on the service. This resulted in a Facebook campaign set up to promote the idea of a fifth season.
- Wolf Lake originally aired on CBS from September 19 to October 24, 2001. Nine episodes were produced, but only five aired before the series was canceled by CBS. The full series, including the four unaired episodes, was later picked up and broadcast on UPN in April–May 2002.

=== 2002 ===
- Under One Roof is a 2002 reality show on the UPN network. Hosted by Rob Nelson, the show's premise was to pit five families against each other to win a Fijian beachfront house. UPN has been criticized for having canceled the show, not once, but twice. After the first two episodes – aired in March and April – fared poorly in the ratings, the show was cancelled. It was brought back again in July as a summer replacement, repeating the first two episodes and airing the third, only to be cancelled again. The final four episodes never aired.
- Half & Half is an American sitcom that aired from September 23, 2002, to May 15, 2006. It was the second-most-watched show on UPN's Monday night line-up (next to Girlfriends) and fourth overall on the network. The show was on The CW's first draft line-up in March 2006, but due to several circumstances—including The CW's contractual obligation to pick up Reba, the uncancelling of All of Us, and the pick-up of the Girlfriends spin-off The Game—Half & Half was left off the final Fall 2006 schedule and ended production.
- Haunted first aired on September 24, 2002, on UPN. The program, which was filmed in Vancouver, was canceled on November 5, 2002, due to low ratings. As a result, only seven of the completed episodes were aired on UPN. However, all eleven filmed episodes have been shown in later airings of the show.

=== 2003 ===
- Abby aired for one season on UPN from January 6, 2003, to March 4, 2003. In 2002, UPN announced that Sydney Tamiia Poitier and Sean O'Bryan would play the lead characters. Abby was Poitier's first starring role in a television series, and her sitcom debut. Describing the show's main concept as "fertile ground for a lot of humor", Poitier was also drawn to its multicultural casting. Producers initially imagined Will as a white character; Katlin said: "We had wanted to have an interracial relationship, but not make the show about an interracial relationship." Producers gave the role to Kadeem Hardison instead of O'Bryan due to a negative response from test audiences. Criticizing the pilot episode for not explicitly addressing Will and Abby's interracial relationship, the previewers frequently asked: "Why aren't you dealing with it?" Addressing the change in casting, Poitier clarified that the series would preserve a "spirit of multiculturalism" through Will and Abby's dating life. She referred to Abby as one of the few television shows to represent interracial couples. As part of a discussion on UPN's 2002–2003 television season, The Baltimore Sun's Greg Braxton cited Abby as an example of the network adding more white actors to its programming; Braxton pointed to the show's focus on a biracial woman and her dates with white men. CBS television executive Leslie Moonves explained that UPN wanted to attract a wider audience. Critics classified Abby as a sex comedy and romantic comedy. Despite UPN's heavy promotion, it attracted a weekly average of just 1.7 million viewers, making it the lowest-performing show tracked by Nielsen Holdings. Critical responses were primarily negative; commentators praised Poitier's acting but criticized the show's reliance on sexual humor. Initially broadcast on Monday nights at 9:30 pm EST in January 2003,Abby was a mid-season replacement after the paranormal drama Haunted was canceled. Between January and March, UPN moved the series to Tuesday nights at 9:00 pm EST, along with the supernatural drama Buffy the Vampire Slayer and the sitcom Girlfriends. The first non-genre show placed in the time slot in two years, Abby aired against established programs Frasier, 24, The Guardian, and Smallville during a "competitive" time. UPN promoted the series as part of "an aggressive rollout strategy", targeting a primarily African-American audience. The Deseret News' Scott D. Pierce wrote that the network was "pinning its hopes on the new sitcom" along with the drama Platinum. UPN branded its Tuesday programming as a "comedy night" and "Girls Night", though Poitier was uncertain of the audience's possible response to the mixture of sitcoms and dramas. She explained that the network wanted Abby to attract the same audience as its Monday comedies. Commercially unsuccessful, Abby ranked last on the list of 146 shows tracked by the Nielsen Holdings; it attracted an average of 1.7 million viewers per week. Canceled after a nine-episode season, the series had its final episode air on March 4, 2003. From July 2003 to August 2003, reruns aired on Tuesday nights at 8:30 pm EST. Overall, Abby was broadcast for a total of 270 minutes.
- The Twilight Zone is the second of three revivals of Rod Serling's original 1959–64 television series. It aired for one season on the UPN network, with actor Forest Whitaker assuming Serling's role as narrator and on-screen host. It premiered on September 18, 2002, and aired its final episode on May 21, 2003. Broadcast in an hour format with two half-hour stories, it was canceled after one season.
- Platinum aired from April 14 to May 13, 2003. Written by John Ridley and Sofia Coppola, the series is a family saga that follows two brothers who own and operate a record company.
- America's Next Top Model premiered in May 2003, and aired semiannually until 2012, then annually from 2013. The first six seasons (referred to as "cycles") aired on UPN, before UPN merged with The WB to create The CW in 2006. It was announced on January 24, 2006, that Top Model would be part of the new The CW network, a merge between UPN and The WB, when the seventh cycle started in September airing on Wednesdays. The series became the first series among regular programming to air on the network. Prior to the announcement of merging with The WB, UPN had committed to renewing the series through its ninth cycle on January 20, 2006, for which casting was conducted throughout mid-2006. America's Next Top Model was the only show left on the network that was originally from UPN.
- Eve originally aired for three seasons from September 15, 2003, to May 11, 2006. Featuring an ensemble cast consisting of Eve, Jason George, Ali Landry, Natalie Desselle-Reid, Brian Hooks, and Sean Maguire, the show revolves around two sets of male and female friends attempting to navigate relationships with the opposite sex. The series was developed as a vehicle for Eve under the working title The Opposite Sex; UPN executives approached the rapper about a television project after the success of fellow musician Brandy in another of the network's sitcoms, Moesha. Eve's series was created as part of the network's attempt to appeal to a younger demographic. After being picked up, the show was renamed Eve to attract the rapper's fans. UPN had promoted Eve as part of its new comedy block, one of four new comedies developed by the network. Eve suffered low viewership in spite of its high ratings among young African-American women; it was canceled following UPN's merger with The WB to launch The CW in 2006. The series' cancellation, along with that of other black sitcoms, was criticized by media outlets for reducing representation of African-American characters and the number of roles for African-American actors on television. Critical response to Eve was mixed; some praised its inclusion as a part of UPN's line-up of black sitcoms, but others felt Eve lacked charisma, and that the series was inferior to its contemporaries. Despite the mixed reception, the show and its star received several award nominations. The show, as well as a majority of UPN's programs, was officially canceled when the network merged with The WB to form The CW in 2006. Fern Gillespie of The Crisis was critical of UPN's decision to cancel the series given how the network, "in one swoop, wiped out five of its eight African-American comedies" with the creation of The CW. Gillespie expressed disappointment at the lack of African American sitcoms on the three major networks, saying: "Without that opportunity for some of the younger artists to hone and develop their skills, it will potentially have a generational impact." IndieWire's Dara T. Mathis identified Eve as an example of UPN's notable black sitcoms, and equated the cancellations of a majority of UPN's comedies as a sign that the genre was in a state of decline. Critic Tim Goodman noted that Eve was one of six shows "geared for an African-American audience," featuring "an African-American lead actress," that were canceled during the merger. He viewed these cancellations as a sign of networks "eliminat[ing] niche programming". Julian Kimble of Complex included Eve on a list of programs that "are often forgotten about," alongside other UPN sitcoms Half & Half and All of Us.
- All of Us premiered on September 16, 2003, where it aired for its first three seasons. On October 1, 2006, the show moved to The CW, a new network formed by the merger of UPN and The WB (whose sister company Warner Bros. Television produced this series), where it aired for one more season before being cancelled on May 14, 2007. All of Us debuted on UPN on September 16, 2003. The series aired on Tuesdays at 8:30 p.m. EST for its first season. The show's second season aired on Tuesday nights at 8 pm and was paired up with fellow UPN sitcom Eve. For its third season, UPN moved the series to Mondays at 8:30 p.m. EST airing after One on One. After three seasons of average ratings, and with the fall 2006 launch of The CW necessitating the cancellations of many of UPN and The WB's lower-rated programs, All of Us was originally slated to be cancelled after the 2005-2006 television season. However, the series was saved at the last minute and placed on The CW's fall 2006 lineup, airing on Sundays at 7:30 p.m. EST after Everybody Hates Chris. Due to lackluster ratings, the show moved back to its former Monday night time slot in the beginning of October 2006. During its single season on The CW, All of Us averaged around 2.74 million viewers per week. All of Us finished the season at #140 in the ratings, surpassing only The Game, America's Next Top Model (encore presentations), and the now cancelled Runaway. On May 15, 2007, The CW canceled All of Us. The CW was transitioning to shows that showcased more teenage and young adult dramas as well as Reality, (since ANTM was the highest rated show on the entire network) and steering away from sitcoms altogether. While the last season of All of Us averaged about the same viewers as the third season of The Vampire Diaries or the last four seasons of Smallville, it, like every other sitcom, be it an original UPN or WB show, was cancelled, as apparent by the CW not acquiring many sitcoms after the merger and slowly cancelling all sitcoms and not funding any after 2009.
- The pilot episode of Rock Me Baby debuted on Monday September 15, 2003. The second episode 'Coupling' aired on September 23, 2003, and the following episodes followed exactly one week later. The last episode for the first series was 'Singing for your Supper' which aired on May 25, 2004. After the first season, UPN decided to cancel production of Rock Me Baby.
- The Mullets first aired in September 2003, and was cancelled in March 2004 due to poor reception. Eleven episodes were made, but only eight were broadcast.

=== 2004 ===
- Game Over is adult computer-animated sitcom created by David Sacks (who would later become president of Nickelodeon Animation Studio), produced by Carsey-Werner Productions, and broadcast on UPN in 2004. It was cancelled after five episodes. Game Over was heavily hyped by UPN before its debut. The show generally received positive press upon its airing. Despite this, only six episodes were made, which aired on a variety of different days – the fourth and fifth episodes were broadcast on April 2, 2004, and the sixth episode ("Monkey Dearest") was not aired.
- Amish in the City premiered on July 28, 2004. The plot revolved around five Amish teenagers experiencing "modern" (non-Amish) culture by living in a house with six mainstream American teenagers. The concept was initially denounced by some for appearing to capitalize upon popular stereotypes about the Amish; later critical reviews were more positive.
- The Player is a 2004 American reality television program in which several men compete with each other using their "player skills" to seduce an attractive woman.
- Second Time Around aired during the 2004–05 season. The series was canceled after one season.
- Veronica Mars premiered on September 22, 2004, during television network UPN's final two years, and ended on May 22, 2007, after a season on UPN's successor, The CW, airing for three seasons total. Filming began in March 2004, and the series premiered in September to 2.49 million American viewers. The critically acclaimed first season's run of 22 episodes garnered an average of 2.5 million viewers per episode in the United States. In July and August 2005, four episodes of the first season aired on CBS, UPN's sibling network, in an attempt to gain more exposure for the series. Although not a ratings success, the series was a critical success from its first season. Robert Abele of LA Weekly said "in this smart, engaging series about a former popular girl turned crime-solving high school outcast, the hard-boiled dialogue comes from its teen protagonist's mouth in a way that stabs any potential cutesiness in the heart with an ice pick." In her review, Paige Wiser of the Chicago Sun Times said that "on Veronica Mars, wholesome is out; gritty reality is in. The show never soft-pedals the timeless, fundamental truth that high school is hell." Joyce Millman of The Phoenix felt that the series was "a character study masquerading as a high-school drama". Joy Press of The Village Voice saw the series as "a sharp teen noir in the making. Tinged with class resentment and nostalgia for Veronica's lost innocence, this series pulses with promise." Michael Abernethy of PopMatters said that "intrigue, drama, and humor, Veronica Mars is also a lesson book for the disenfranchised. Few TV series aim so high; even fewer succeed so well." James Poniewozik of Time labeled it as one of the six best dramas on television. He praised Bell as "a captivating star", and said that the series "uses its pulp premise to dramatize a universal teen experience: that growing up means sleuthing out the mystery of who you really are." Kay McFadden of The Seattle Times called the series an update to the "classic California film noir". She felt that Veronica Mars was the best new series on UPN, and that the title character was potentially "this season's most interesting character creation". McFadden described the series as "Alias in its attitude, Raymond Chandler in its writing and The O.C. in its class-consciousness." Stephanie Zacharek of Salon praised the first-season finale for being "just the sort of satisfying capper you look for in a series that, week after week, keeps you asking questions."

I * Kevin Hill aired from September 29, 2004, to May 18, 2005, during the 2004–2005 television season.

=== 2005 ===
- Cuts aired from February 14, 2005, to May 11, 2006, and is a spin-off of another UPN series, One on One. The series is set up in the 21st and 22nd episodes of the third season of One on One titled "The Prodigal Brother" and "Splitting Hairs". The show was canceled along with many other shows when the UPN and WB networks merged to form The CW.
- Britney and Kevin: Chaotic is an American reality television series created and directed by Anthony E. Zuiker. Starring American recording artist Britney Spears and her then-husband Kevin Federline, the five-episode series aired on UPN from May 17 to June 14, 2005. The series chronicles the couple's relationship from their courtship, engagement and wedding. After a "fierce bidding war", on April 5, 2005, it was announced that Spears had signed a deal with UPN to air a reality television series documenting her relationship with Federline. The series, which would air in five episodes, was revealed to chronicle the relationship "from the earliest stages of their courtship to their engagement and ultimately, their stroll down the aisle". In a statement about the series, Spears stated: "From the day that Kevin and I met, there have been constant rumors and inaccurate speculation about our lives together. I feel that last year, the tabloids ran my life, and I am really excited about showing my fans what really happened, rather than all the stories, which have been misconstrued by journalists in the past. As I mentioned before, I am now going to be expressing my personal life through art". The first episode of the series was seen by 3.7 million viewers, making it UPN's most-watched piece of regularly scheduled programming in the 9 pm Tuesday timeslot since March 2004. The second episode garnered 3 million viewers, finishing in eighty-first in its timeslot for the week. The third and fourth episode were viewed by 2.5 million viewers each, while the final, aired an hour earlier at 8:00 pm Eastern Standard Time, drew 2.1 million viewers. In one month, Britney and Kevin: Chaotic lost 1.6 million viewers.
- The Bad Girl's Guide aired from May 24 to July 5, 2005. The television show was based on the best-selling Bad Girls Guides by Cameron Tuttle, who was the show's co-creator and co-executive producer.
- The Road to Stardom with Missy Elliott was a competitive reality television show that aired in 2005. The main judge and host was hip-hop artist Missy Elliott. Other judges were singer-producer Teena Marie, producer Dallas Austin, and manager Mona Scott. The show was not picked up for a second season.
- R U the Girl aired in 2005. The series featured Tionne "T-Boz" Watkins and Rozonda "Chilli" Thomas, the remaining members of the all-girl R&B group TLC whose former member, Lisa "Left Eye" Lopes, died in a car crash in Honduras on April 25, 2002. Initially promoted as a contest to permanently replace Lopes 3 years after her death by TLC themselves, both Watkins and Thomas admitted that the winner of the contest would not be joining TLC full-time and would not be a full-time replacement member; the winner would only provide guest vocals on a new single by the duo. The program aired nine episodes, with seven episodes being the main episodes, the eighth episode being an overview of the series and original TLC home videos, and the ninth being the series finale. The episodes' names are also puns based on TLC's songs. The finale episode was aired live and featured the final two contestants O'so Krispie and Mirrah Fay-Parker. Krispie (Tiffany Baker), a 20-year-old choreographer from Atlanta, was ultimately chosen as the winner and performed the single "I Bet" with Watkins and Thomas on the series finale.
- Sex, Love & Secrets originally aired from September 27 to October 18, 2005. Sex, Love & Secrets was broadcast initially on Tuesday nights at 9 pm EST on UPN. The episodes aired between September 27, 2005, and October 18, 2005. It was one of three new shows the network ordered for the 2005–06 United States network television schedule. The show's official website hosted preview videos and an interactive map of the Silver Lake community. Muir wrote that UPN intended to market the series to fans of Beverly Hills, 90210 and Melrose Place. Melanie McFarland considered Sex, Love & Secrets part of the network's plans to add more prime-time soap operas to its scheduling. The show was a TV14 rating for suggestive dialogue, sexual situations, and coarse or crude language. The pilot received "mixed reviews and weak viewership", having been watched by an average of 1.4 million people. Due to its poor reception and ratings, UPN canceled Sex, Love & Secrets after one episode aired. It had the lowest rating of any network television show that aired in the 2005–06 season. The network clarified that it would broadcast the remaining episodes that had been filmed, and might renew the show if ratings improved. UPN did not air six of the eight episodes. Sex, Love & rated 155th out of 156 shows in the 2005–06 television schedule—above only Get This Party Started. According to Muir, it fared poorly in every demographic. In 2008, Universal HD played the unaired episodes of Sex, Love & Secrets as part of its "Sexy Summer Sundays" along with episodes of South Beach.

=== 2006 ===
This would be the final season of broadcasting for both UPN and The WB. They would merge to form The CW next season. UPN quietly ceased operations on Friday, September 15, 2006, with its usual airing of WWE Friday Night SmackDown!; in addition, some stations aired the network's usual, but optional, weekend repeat block. The low-key closure was not surprising given that in nine media markets, including the three largest, UPN was not available because the local affiliates were owned by Fox Television Stations and switched to its new network, MyNetworkTV, on September 5. UPN programs stopped airing on WPWR (channel 50) in Chicago and KUTP (channel 45) in Phoenix on September 1, and on the other seven Fox-owned stations (including WWOR-TV (channel 9) in New York City and KCOP (channel 13) in Los Angeles) the day before, August 31.

Several CW affiliates began airing SmackDown! and some other CW-renewed UPN programming a few weeks early to replace UPN affiliates that had switched to MyNetworkTV. Otherwise, it was unclear whether MyNetworkTV affiliates would air UPN or WB programs at all. Additionally, Tribune-owned Fox affiliate WXMI (channel 17) in Grand Rapids, Michigan aired SmackDown! on tape delay between WXSP-CA (channel 15)'s switch to MyNetworkTV and the launch of WWMT (channel 3)'s digital subchannel as the local CW affiliate.

- Get This Party Started is a reality television series hosted by Ethan Erickson and Kristin Cavallari in early February 2006. The program was scheduled in the lowest-rated time slot of the 2005-06 television season in UPN's 9:00 pm – 10:00 pm Tuesday slot, where Sex, Love & Secrets had failed before. Get This Party Started garnered low ratings and was canceled by the network after only two episodes. The show ended up rated 156th, last out of the 156 programs which aired on the six major American broadcast networks in the 2005–06 season.
- South Beach ran from January 11 to February 22, 2006. It was canceled after eight first-run episodes. Similar to UPN's Fall 2005 effort Sex, Love & Secrets, South Beach was not welcomed by critics. The Miami Herald said that, "Cannibalism is about the only thing missing from this delirious new trashfest of hard bodies and soft brains." The Washington Post's headline for the show was "Bang, Bang, Bling, Bling, Blah, Blah." The writer called the show "vacuous... preposterous and pretentious." The Seattle Times said, "The dialogue's awful, ranging from clichés ("I don't want to work in my uncle's restaurant the rest of my life") to quotations ("First you get the money, then you get the power, then you get the women") to product placements ("Anybody got a Red Bull?"). The show was one of the lowest-rated on television. It ranked 152nd out of the 156 original series produced for network television in the 2005–2006 season. South Beach was canceled when it was announced that the new The WB/UPN hybrid network, The CW, would not renew the show for additional seasons.
- Everybody Hates Chris originally aired on UPN for its first season in 2005, but later moved to The CW, where it aired its remaining three seasons.
- Love, Inc. originally aired for one season from September 22, 2005, to May 11, 2006. The series was originally designed as a star vehicle for Shannen Doherty, who portrayed Denise Johnson in the unaired pilot. Denise was Doherty's first role in a television sitcom. Doherty said that she loved the script for the pilot immediately, describing it as "hysterical", but felt intimidated by the role given her inexperience with comedy. The series was marketed initially as featuring Doherty and Peete, before UPN announced that it would pick up the show on the condition that Doherty was removed and the character was recast. According to TV Guide, Doherty was poorly received by preview audiences. When asked about Doherty's removal from the show, executive producer Warren Littlefield said the actress was "fabulous" in the role. He believed Doherty wanted to change her negative reputation from leaving Beverly Hills, 90210 and Charmed by acting on the show. Peete praised her performance saying "we had so much fun and such a great vibe". UPN Entertainment's president cited the rationale behind Doherty's departure using the "standard going-in-a-different-direction reason". Rachel Cericola of TV Fodder listed Love, Inc. as one of the "four promising sitcoms for the upcoming TV season" as a result of the behind the scenes drama involving Doherty's replacement. UPN announced that Busy Philipps was cast as Denise on July 25, and was later billed as the show's star. In her 2018 memoir, Phillips said she was initially reluctant the part due to UPN's treatment of Doherty, writing: "they had decided to replace her only after they had trotted her out at the up-fronts and used her for publicity, which I thought was a fairly shitty thing to do". According to Vince Vieluf, the casting change from Doherty to Philipps led to the series being retooled as an ensemble show featuring all the members of the agency rather than focusing on Denise. Vieluf said the alterations in the series' premise were due to concerns that "people would get tired of a show that was only about the mishaps of one person's love life". The casting of racially diverse actors was identified with UPN's position as "the only network to actively program for an African American audience". Tim Good of the San Francisco Chronicle pointed to the show's casting as the only way in which it acts as a "positive reference". On August 6, 2005, UPN officially ordered thirteen episodes of the series. The network later ordered a full season of twenty-two episodes of the show on November 7, 2005, amid speculation that it would be canceled. UPN paired the series with Everybody Hates Chris, Eve, and Cuts to attract an "urban" audience. The network moved WWE SmackDown to Fridays in favor of scheduling Thursdays as focused on sitcoms. This decision was made to establish a "night of scripted programming" and to attract more advertising from film studios to promote upcoming releases. Today questioned the network's belief that Love, Inc. and Everybody Hates Chris would appeal to the same viewership, and noted the difference in quality between the two, with Love, Inc. cited as the inferior show. While the series retained 59% of the audience from Everybody Hates Chris initially, this marketing strategy proved unsuccessful when it lost a majority of the viewership in later episodes. Cericola reported that Love, Inc. earned an average of 3.6 million viewers per episode and an article in The Hollywood Reporter stated that the series garnered an average of 1.0/3 Nielsen rating/share in the 18–49 demographic. It ranked 141st among broadcast television networks in the 2005–2006 television season. According to the Nielsen Company, the show achieved high ratings among "Latina adolescents Ages 12–17" and earned 3.4 million viewers in that demographic in 2005. It ranked above two other UPN sitcoms: One on One and Half & Half for Latin women in the 12–17 age demographic, and in "the top half of all UPN series" for total viewership. The series premiere saw a 6% increase in the 18–49 age range, 53% in women between 18 and 34, and 118% in women between 18 and 49 from the show that aired in the same time period during the previous television season. The show, as well as a majority of UPN's programs, were officially canceled as a result of the network's merger with the WB Television Network (the WB) to form the CW in 2006. Fern Gillespie of The Crisis was critical of UPN's decision to cancel the series given how the network "in one swoop, wiped out five of its eight African American comedies" for the creation of the CW. Gillespie expressed disappointment at the lack of African American sitcoms on the three major networks saying: "Without that opportunity for some of the younger artists to hone and develop their skills, it will potentially have a generational impact." Critic Tim Goodman identified Love, Inc. as one of six shows "geared for an African American audience" and featuring "an African American lead actress" that were canceled during the merger. He equated these cancellations as a sign of networks "eliminat[ing] niche programming".

== See also ==
- List of programs broadcast by UPN
- List of former UPN affiliates
- UPN Kids
  - Disney's One Too
- History of The WB
