= History of The WB =

History of the defunct American broadcast television network

The WB was an American broadcast television network operated as a joint venture between the Warner Bros. Entertainment division of Time Warner (which acted as controlling partner) and the Tribune Broadcasting subsidiary of the Tribune Company. Launched on January 11, 1995, it was one of two networks developed by major film and television studios in late 1993—alongside the United Paramount Network (UPN, a joint venture between Paramount Television and Chris-Craft/United Television)—to compete with Fox and the longer established Big Three television networks (ABC, NBC and CBS).

Like Fox, the network's programming targeted certain demographics underserved by the Big Three; it notably carved a niche catering to teenagers and young adults between the ages of 13 and 35 (with series such as 7th Heaven, Buffy the Vampire Slayer, Dawson's Creek, Smallville, One Tree Hill and Supernatural), although it also featured programs aimed at Black audiences (such as Sister, Sister, The Wayans Bros., The Jamie Foxx Show and The Steve Harvey Show) before gradually ceding that demographic to UPN—which had cemented its own niche among that audience with its slate of sitcoms—beginning in the early 2000s. The network also offered a children's program block, Kids' WB, which launched in September 1995 and featured primarily animated series targeted at children aged 4 to 12.

This article details the history of The WB tracing to its founding by Time Warner in November 1993, and its operational history from the network's January 1995 launch until its closure in September 2006, when Time Warner and CBS Corporation (then-owner of rival UPN) launched The CW, a new broadcast network formed by the two companies as a 50/50 joint venture that utilized certain resources and initially featured programming carried over from the predecessor networks.

== Background ==
With the success with Fox, several other media companies started to enter the broadcasting world in the 1990s to create the fifth commercial broadcast network that would allow a station to brand itself better and to stand out amongst the increasing number of television channels, particularly cable networks. Chris-Craft Industries subsidiary United Television and Warner Bros. Television Distribution jointly launched the Prime Time Entertainment Network, a consortium created in attempt at creating a new "fifth network," in September 1993. By early 1994, PTEN, Spelling Premiere Network (operated by Worldvision Enterprises), Universal Family Network (a children's and family programming service operated by Universal Television), and proposed networks in development from Time Warner and Paramount Television were being shopped to prospective stations, alongside syndicated blocks such as Buena Vista Television's The Disney Afternoon and MCA/Universal's Action Pack. Spelling Premiere Network would launch in August 1994. All American Television considered launching a first-run movie network with 22 movies by November 1994.

Chris-Craft/United Television then partnered with Paramount (by then recently merged with Viacom) to create the United Paramount Network (UPN), which launched in January 1995. Warner Bros. parent Time Warner then formed a partnership with the Tribune Company to create The WB, which also launched less than a week after UPN made its debut. Concurrently, United left PTEN's parent, the Prime Time Consortium, to focus on UPN, leaving PTEN as primarily a syndicator of its remaining programs; the service shared affiliations with its respective parents' own network ventures (in some cases, resulting in PTEN's programming airing in off-peak time slots) until it finally folded in September 1997.

== 1990s ==
Controversial from the very beginning, the Financial Interest and Syndication Rules (or "fin-syn"), implemented by the Federal Communications Commission (FCC) in 1970, were relaxed slightly during the 1980s. In the wake of substantial changes to the television landscape, such as the rise of the Fox network and cable television, the FCC fully repealed the fin-syn rules in 1993. It was the repeal of fin-syn that ultimately made newer broadcast networks such as UPN and The WB financially interesting for their highly vertically integrated parent media conglomerates Paramount Pictures (Viacom) and Time Warner, respectively.

On November 2, 1993, Time Warner announced the formation of The WB Television Network, a venture developed in partnership with the Tribune Company (which, prior to acquiring an 11% interest in August 1995, was a non-equity partner in the new network) and former Fox network executive Jamie Kellner (who would serve as the original president of and would hold a minority ownership stake in The WB). Tribune committed six of the seven independent stations it owned at the time to serve as charter affiliates of the network, though it initially exempted the WGN-TV Chicago signal from the agreement, as station management had expressed concerns about how the network's plans to expand its prime time and daytime program offerings would affect WGN's sports broadcast rights and the impact that the potential of having to phase them out to fulfill network commitments would have on the superstation feed's appeal to cable and satellite providers elsewhere around the United States. Tribune would reverse course on December 3, 1993, reaching a separate agreement with Time Warner to allow WGN-TV to become The WB's charter affiliate for the Chicago market and allow the WGN superstation feed to serve as a de facto national network feed intended for American media markets that did not initially have a local affiliate; this would bide The WB enough time to fill remaining gaps in affiliate coverage in "white area" regions that lacked a standalone independent station following its launch. In exchange, Time Warner agreed to reduce the network's initial program offerings to one night per week (from two) in order to limit conflicts with WGN's sports programming. The superstation feed, which reached 37% of the country by that time, would extend the network's initial coverage to 73% of all U.S. households that had at least one television set.

=== 1995 ===
The WB launched on January 11, 1995, with an initial two-hour lineup of sitcoms on Wednesday nights. The inaugural lineup consisted of The Wayans Bros. (a star vehicle for comedians Shawn and Marlon Wayans, who also co-created the series), Unhappily Ever After (a dysfunctional family sitcom from Married... with Children co-creator Ron Leavitt), and Muscle (a parody of primetime soap operas from Paul Junger Witt and Tony Thomas, utilizing a similar concept as their groundbreaking 1970s ABC satirical comedy Soap); a fourth series, The Parent 'Hood (a family sitcom starring and co-created by Robert Townsend), debuted the following week (January 18). Of the four series on the initial lineup, Muscle was the only one not to be renewed for the 1995–96 season; it was canceled before the completion of its first season due to low ratings.

In January 1995, Tribune Broadcasting became a minority partner in The WB, acquiring a 12.5% ownership interest in the network from Time Warner (which operated the network through its Warner Bros. Television division); Tribune would eventually increase its equity stake in the network to 22%. In addition, partly as a result of its November 1993 affiliation deal with the network, most of Tribune's television properties became charter WB affiliates; one of its stations, WGNX-TV (now WANF) in Atlanta, was slated to join The WB, but instead became a CBS affiliate after a major realignment of network affiliations resulted in CBS losing its former Atlanta affiliate, WAGA-TV, to Fox. (Former Fox station WATL, which the network sold to accommodate the switch resulting from Fox's broader affiliation deal with WAGA owner New World Communications, instead took the WB affiliation.) On July 2, 1996, Tribune acquired Renaissance Broadcasting, which owned Fox- and WB-affiliated stations in six large and mid-sized markets.

The WGN-TV local and superstation feeds became charter affiliates of The WB when the network launched on January 11, 1995. (In the case of the Chicago signal, this marked the first time that WGN-TV was affiliated with a major broadcast network since DuMont ceased operations in August 1956.) The WGN cable agreement resulted in The WB becoming the second American broadcast television network to distribute its programming directly to a cable-originated service to provide extended coverage in designated "white areas" without broadcast affiliate clearances and one of three network-to-cable undertakings stewarded by Jamie Kellner. As The WB was under development, Kellner was in process of developing The WeB, a proposed national WB cable feed for smaller markets based upon a service that he launched as President of the Fox Broadcasting Company, Foxnet, which operated from June 1991 until September 2006. The use of WGN as a national relay feed gave The WB an early advantage over the United Paramount Network (UPN) – another fledgling network that made its national debut on January 16, 1995, as a joint venture between Chris-Craft/United Television and Paramount Television – which declined to allow the WWOR EMI Service to act as its national conduit in spite of similar initial gaps in UPN's broadcast affiliate coverage. The WGN superstation feed accounted for roughly 18% of the national coverage that The WB had at launch, with the rest of the network's initial 62% total reach coming from the 60 broadcast affiliates (including WGN-TV) that were willing to adhere to its reverse compensation plan for prospective affiliates. In some areas where cable systems did not carry the superstation feed and maintenance of a local WB affiliate was not yet possible, satellite distribution was the only method in which viewers could see the network's programming over WGN. (The WGN national feed served as the default WB affiliate for residents in 152 markets and the entirety of 21 U.S. states—Alaska, Arkansas, Delaware, Idaho, Iowa, Kansas, Maine, Mississippi, Montana, New Hampshire, New Mexico, North Dakota, Oklahoma, South Carolina, South Dakota, Tennessee, Vermont, Washington, West Virginia, Wisconsin and Wyoming—at varying periods of time up through the launch of The WeB.) United Video intended to provide an alternate feed of WGN with substitute programming for markets that had a WB-affiliated station; however, no such measure was taken, creating network duplication in markets where over-the-air WB affiliates were forced to compete with the WGN cable feed.

The WGN superstation feed carried The WB's prime time lineup from the start of the network's operations, and added the Kids' WB children's programming block when it was launched by the network on September 11, 1995. Conversely, in the Chicago market, WGN-TV chose to only air the network's prime time lineup, and exercised a right of first refusal to decline Kids' WB in order to offer a local morning newscast and an afternoon block of syndicated sitcoms aimed at a family audience on weekdays and a mix of locally produced news, public affairs and children's programs as well as paid programs on weekend mornings; this cleared the way for Weigel Broadcasting to cut a separate deal to air Kids' WB programs locally over group flagship WCIU-TV (channel 26, now a CW affiliate), an independent station that ran the block Monday through Saturdays from September 1995 until WGN-TV began clearing the block on its schedule in September 2004. As The WB's initial program offerings ran on Wednesdays for its first nine months of operation and would not expand its prime time schedule to six nights a week until September 1999, the superstation feed filled the 8:00 to 10:00 p.m. Eastern Time slot on nights without WB network programming with either sports telecasts from WGN-TV that were cleared for national broadcast – which, as The WB expanded its programming to other nights over a four-year period beginning with the September 1995 launch of its Sunday lineup, would result in pre-emptions of the network's programs until later in the week – or, as with most over-the-air WB affiliates during the network's early years, theatrical feature films acquired via the syndication market.

The WB would expand its programming for the 1995–96 season, adding a second night of programming and expanding into daytime. First on September 9, 1995, the network launched Kids' WB, a children's programming block—initially consisting of one-hour weekday afternoon and three-hour Saturday morning blocks—offering a mix of new and existing Warner Bros. animated series (including a few shows that originated either on Fox Kids or in syndication).

Then on September 10, 1995, the network's prime time schedule expanded to Sundays, with a three-hour lineup of live-action and animated comedies: Pinky and the Brain (a spinoff of Animaniacs), Kirk (a family comedy vehicle for former Growing Pains star Kirk Cameron), Simon (a more adult-oriented buddy comedy starring Harland Williams and Jason Bateman), Cleghorne! (a vehicle for comedienne and former Saturday Night Live cast member Ellen Cleghorne) and First Time Out (an ensemble comedy starring Jackie Guerra, advertised to be the first Latina to star in her own television series, described as a "Latino Living Single"). The network also acquired Sister, Sister (a teen/blended family sitcom starring Tia and Tamera Mowry), which had been cancelled by ABC that Spring after ratings declined during its second season.

Notable shows

- The Wayans Bros. aired from January 11, 1995, to May 20, 1999. It was the first of the four sitcoms that aired as part of the original Wednesday night two hour lineup that helped launch the network (along with Unhappily Ever After, The Parent 'Hood and the short-lived Muscle). While in development, the series' working title was initially supposed to have been Brother to Brother, before the name of the series changed to The Wayans Bros. The show was originally intended to air on NBC. Unfortunately, due to the fact that the network wanted Danny Glover to play the brothers’ father on the show instead, they decided not to move forward with the project. After NBC dropped the show, it was also offered to ABC for a TGIF slot since The Wayans Bros. was produced by Warner Bros. Television who produced all if not most of the shows on the TGIF block Friday nights on ABC at the time but the call to ABC fell on deaf ears, so after both ABC and NBC rejected the show, WB network executives reached out to Marlon and said “We’ll take it.”. The series was cancelled in 1999 due to declining ratings and was not given a proper finale.
- The Parent 'Hood aired from January 18, 1995, to July 25, 1999. The series starred Robert Townsend and Suzzanne Douglas. Originally to be titled Father Knows Nothing (a parody of the title of the 1950s sitcom Father Knows Best), the series was one of the four sitcoms that aired as part of the original Wednesday-night two-hour lineup that helped launch The WB network (along with The Wayans Bros., Unhappily Ever After, and the short-lived Muscle).
- Unhappily Ever After aired for 100 episodes from January 11, 1995, to May 23, 1999, for a total of five seasons. Unhappily Ever After was one of the four sitcoms that aired as part of the original Wednesday night two-hour lineup that helped launch The WB network (along with The Wayans Bros., The Parent 'Hood and the short-lived Muscle).
- Muscle aired from January 11 to May 24, 1995. Muscle was one of the four sitcoms that aired as part of the original Wednesday night two-hour WB lineup, at 9:30/8:30c (with The Wayans Bros., The Parent 'Hood, and Unhappily Ever After being scheduled before it). It was the only one of the four that did not make it past the first season, and was also the first series to get canceled on the brand new WB. Like its inspiration, ABC's Soap from the 1970s, it ended on an unresolved cliffhanger after being canceled due to low ratings.
- Sister, Sister was picked up by ABC as a midseason replacement and debuted on April 1, 1994, as part of the network's TGIF comedy lineup. The show later moved to a new timeslot for the 1994–95 season, but ABC announced that it was cancelling the program due to low ratings and its final episode aired April 28, 1995. The network, which was still in its infancy in 1995, picked up Sister, Sister to replace the cancelled Muscle on its Wednesday night lineup of shows and the third season debuted on September 6, 1995. The program found its niche as part of The WB's lineup and aired for four additional seasons on the network, with the final episode airing on May 23, 1999. After being picked up by The WB in 1995, reruns of the first two seasons of Sister, Sister were broadcast in early primetime as part of the network's then-newly launched Sunday night lineup during the 1995–1996 season, in addition to the first-run episodes of the series that aired on the WB's Wednesday night schedule.
- Kirk aired from August 23, 1995, to January 12, 1997. Kirk was one of only two series produced by Bickley-Warren Productions and Jeff Franklin Productions that was not produced by Miller-Boyett Productions (the other being Hangin' with Mr. Cooper, which William Bickley and Michael Warren served as showrunners/executive producers during that series' final three seasons). During the development stage, the series originally went under the working title Life Happens, and was originally conceived as a series for ABC (who had broadcast other series produced by Bickley and Warren, and their production partners Thomas L. Miller and Robert L. Boyett) before the network's decision to move away from family sitcoms, just prior to the network's 1995 purchase by The Walt Disney Company.
- On September 9, 1995, Pinky and the Brain were spun off onto their own half-hour series on Kids' WB!, with each episode consisting of one or more segments, including some of the segments from Animaniacs. The first season was scheduled in a prime time slot from September 10, 1995, through July 21, 1996, as part of the new WB network lineup, with episodes also being repeated within the Saturday morning cartoon block. It had been envisioned for the cartoon to be WB network's answer to The Simpsons, at that point in its 7th season, which was running on the FOX network. The series tended to have more jokes and humor aimed at adults rather than children. Due to poor ratings following the first season, primarily due to running against 60 Minutes, subsequent seasons were moved to Saturday mornings as part of the Kids' WB! programming block.
- Simon aired from September 10, 1995, to February 25, 1996.
- Cleghorne! aired from September 10 to December 17, 1995. The series was put on hiatus by The WB after December 1995, having aired just 12 episodes; the show was later cancelled with three episodes left unaired.
- First Time Out premiered on September 10, 1995, and last aired an original episode on December 17, 1995, after which it was put on hiatus by The WB, leaving four episodes unaired.

=== 1996 ===
In January 1996, The WB debuted its first drama series and first hour-long program: the Aaron Spelling,-produced prime time soap opera Savannah. While Sister, Sister and Pinky and the Brain performed well for the network (although the latter would move exclusively to the Kids' WB lineup for the 1996–97 season), most of the other new shows that debuted during the 1995–96 season failed to garner much traction with viewers; even Kirk and Savannah, the only two series from the 1995–96 slate to earn renewals for 1996–97, were both cancelled after their respective second seasons.

The WB added a third night of prime time shows for the 1996–97 season, debuting its Monday night schedule on August 26, 1996. Joining Savannah on the new lineup was the Aaron Spelling-produced family drama 7th Heaven (centering on a reverend and his wife as they deal with the tribulations of raising seven children and helping people in need of help with personal matters). Also debuting that season were sitcoms The Steve Harvey Show (starring Harvey as a funk musician working as a music teacher at an inner-city Chicago high school), and The Jamie Foxx Show (starring Foxx as an aspiring actor/singer working at a Los Angeles hotel owned by his aunt and uncle). All three series became relative hits for The WB, none moreso than 7th Heaven, which would going on to become its longest-running series, airing for 11 seasons (moving to The CW for its final season).

Notable shows

- Savannah's first season was broadcast between January 21, 1996, and April 7, 1996. The first two episodes were shown together as a two-hour Saturday "sneak preview" of the upcoming series, with the remaining season one episodes shown on Sunday nights (The WB dubbing the evening "Savannah Sunday".). The show was the most successful program on The WB at the time. During its second season, Savannah was moved to Monday nights, the 22 second-season episodes broadcast between August 26, 1996, and February 24, 1997, at 9:00 pm following 7th Heaven. It was cancelled at the end of the season. Garth Ancier, president of the WB's entertainment division, attributed its cancellation to the fact that "serial dramas don't repeat well, making the investment too expensive". Its mid season replacement would be the eventual cult classic Buffy the Vampire Slayer, created by a then unknown Joss Whedon, which would run for seven seasons, becoming a global phenomenon and spawning a multimedia franchise known as the Buffyverse
- Brotherly Love ran from September 16, 1995, to April 1, 1996, on NBC, and then moved to The WB, where it aired from September 15, 1996, until May 18, 1997.
- Nick Freno: Licensed Teacher aired from August 28, 1996, until May 3, 1998. The series was created and executive produced by Dennis Rinsler and Marc Warren who drew on their own experiences as former teachers in New York City. They based the title character on their elementary school music teacher and friend, John Freno.
- The Steve Harvey Show aired from August 25, 1996, to February 17, 2002. In 2001, Harvey decided to pursue other projects. He wished to end the show after the fifth season, but at the insistence of the WB network, reluctantly filmed a 13-episode sixth season.
- Life with Roger aired from September 8, 1996, to March 30, 1997, airing twenty episodes, before being canceled in March 1997 due to low ratings.
- 7th Heaven debuted on August 26, 1996, and aired on the network for ten seasons. Following the shutdown of The WB and its merger with UPN to form The CW, the series aired on the new network on September 25, 2006, for its eleventh and final season, airing its final episode on May 13, 2007. 7th Heaven was the last series to be produced by Spelling Television (later produced by CBS Paramount Network Television for the eleventh and final season) before it was shut down and became an in-name-only unit of CBS Television Studios. Although originally produced for Fox in 1996, the show aired on the WB. It was produced by Spelling Television and distributed for syndication by CBS Television Distribution. Its producers, including Aaron Spelling, considered it wholesome family viewing, incorporating public service announcements into the show. The final season of 7th Heaven was shown on the inaugural season of The CW. The show wrapped production on the final episode March 8, 2007, about one month before most shows film their last episodes of the season. This was due largely to the fact that after ten years of working together, the actors, producers and crew had gotten production down to a steady pace, slashing costs repeatedly and routinely coming in well under budget. This resulted in 7th Heaven filming episodes in shorter time during the final seasons. After much deliberation within the now-defunct WB network, it was made public in November 2005 that the tenth season would be the program's final season because of high costs, which were revealed to be due to a poorly negotiated licensing agreement by the WB network a few years earlier. The program's future was hanging in the balance and it was entirely in the hands of the newly established CW network whether to renew it for an eleventh seasonal run. In March 2006, the main cast of characters were approached about the possibility of returning for an eleventh season. After further consideration by the CW network, it was decided three days after the airing of its "series finale", that 7th Heaven would be picked up for an eleventh season, which would air on their network in the Monday-night slot that had helped make it famous. Originally the show was renewed for thirteen episodes, but on September 18, 2006, the renewal was extended to a full twenty-two episodes. Along with the show's unexpected and last-minute renewal came some changes. The show's already-low budget was moderately trimmed, forcing cuts in the salaries of some cast members and shortened filming schedules (seven days per episode instead of the typical eight). David Gallagher, who played Simon, chose not to return as a regular. Furthermore, Mackenzie Rosman, who played youngest daughter Ruthie, did not appear in the first six episodes. Catherine Hicks missed three episodes in Season 11, as another cost-cutting move. Additionally, George Stults was absent for a few episodes at the beginning of season 11. Also, after airing Monday nights at 8/7c for ten seasons, plus the first two episodes of season 11, the CW unexpectedly moved 7th Heaven to Sunday nights as of October 15, 2006. The Sunday/Monday lineup swap was attributed to mediocre ratings of shows on both nights. While 7th Heaven did improve in numbers over the CW's previous Sunday night programming, it never quite hit its Monday-night momentum again. 7th Heaven was the most watched TV series ever on the WB. It holds the record for the WB's most watched hour at 12.5 million viewers, on February 8, 1999; 19 of the WB's 20 most watched hours were from 7th Heaven. On May 8, 2006, it was watched by 7.56 million viewers, the highest rating for the WB since January 2005. When the show moved to the CW, ratings dropped. Possible reasons for the decline include an aired "Countdown to Goodbye" ad campaign for the last six months of the 2005–06 season, which promoted it as the final season ever; though the CW announced the series' unexpected renewal, it didn't promote the new season strongly via billboards, bus stops, magazine or on-air promos. Lastly, the network moved 7th Heaven from its long-established Monday night slot to Sunday nights, causing ratings to drop further. The series had a season average of just 3.3 million on the new network, losing 36% of the previous year's audience. It was the third most watched scripted show on the CW. Overall, it was the seventh most watched show.
- The Jamie Foxx Show aired from August 28, 1996, to January 14, 2001. The series stars Jamie Foxx, Garcelle Beauvais, Christopher B. Duncan, Ellia English, and Garrett Morris. Although the show was not a major success with the ratings due to The WB being a relatively new network, the show did help launch Foxx's acting career while also relaunching Morris' career after his 1994 shooting. It also served as a launch pad for Beauvais who would go on to star in ABC's NYPD Blue.

=== 1997 ===
Notable shows

- Smart Guy ran for three seasons from April 2, 1997, to May 16, 1999. The series was produced by de Passe Entertainment and Danny Kallis Productions, in association with Walt Disney Television.
- The Tom Show aired on Sunday nights from September 7, 1997, to February 22, 1998.
- Alright Already aired from September 7, 1997, to May 4, 1998.

=== 1998 ===
Notable shows

- Kelly Kelly aired from April 20 to June 7, 1998. Columbia TriStar Television had originally developed the series, and produced a pilot, before handing over production of the show to Warner Bros. Television. During filming of the first episode, Shelley Long broke a finger while catching a football. After airing two episodes to low ratings, The network moved the series from Mondays to Sundays. Seven episodes are registered with the United States Copyright Office.
- You're the One aired from April 19 until May 3, 1998.
- Three aired from February 2 to March 23, 1998.
- Dawson's Creek was created by Kevin Williamson and debuted on January 20, 1998. It was produced by Columbia TriStar Television (renamed Sony Pictures Television before the sixth and final season) and was filmed in Wilmington, North Carolina. The series ended on May 14, 2003. During the course of the series, 128 episodes of Dawson's Creek aired over six seasons. Following the selling of his spec script for Wes Craven-directed Scream (1996), film assistant Kevin Williamson was taking several meetings with film and television producers before the slasher film began production. In what would be his first television meeting, Williamson met executive Paul Stupin and, when asked if he had ideas for a television production, Williamson came up with the idea of a teen series based on his youth growing up near a North Carolina creek as an aspiring filmmaker who worshipped director Steven Spielberg. Stupin liked his idea and asked him to come back the next day and pitch it to Columbia TriStar Television studios, prompting Williamson to write a 20-page outline for Dawson's Creek that night. Williamson pitched the show "as Some Kind of Wonderful, meets Pump Up the Volume, meets James at 15, meets My So-Called Life, meets Little House on the Prairie", also taking inspiration from teen drama Beverly Hills, 90210 as he "wanted it to speak to the teenage audience of the day." When Columbia requested him to relocate the show to Boston, Massachusetts, he settled with fictional Capeside, and pitched it to Fox. However, commissioned amid the struggling of Party of Five, Fox wondered if they needed another teen drama, and while they were supportive of Williamson's scripts, they eventually passed on it. Left unused, Columbia TriStar sent his scripts to newly founded network who was looking for fresh ideas for their programme after launching supernatural drama series Buffy the Vampire Slayer. Williamson went for a meeting with then-chief programmer Garth Ancier and entertainment president Susanne Daniels who loved his script and picked it up for the network's new Tuesday night lineup. Procter & Gamble Productions joined in as an original co-producer of the series, however, sold its interest in the show three months before the premiere when printed stories surfaced about the racy dialogue and risqué plot lines. While never a huge ratings success among the general television population, Dawson's Creek did very well with the younger demographic it targeted and became a defining show for the WB Network. The pilot episode was watched by 6.8 million viewers and had a 4.8 rating which was the network's highest rating at the time. The first season's highest ranked episode was the finale, which was fifty-ninth, while the second highest rated was the second episode (probably scoring so well partially because the other major networks carried President Clinton's State of the Union address in the midst of the Lewinsky scandal rather than their regular programming). The finale itself was watched by 7.8 million U.S. viewers, which was its largest audience ever.
- Invasion America is a 1998 American animated science fiction miniseries that aired in the prime time lineup. Produced by DreamWorks Animation (then part of DreamWorks proper, now owned by Universal Studios), the series was created by Steven Spielberg and Harve Bennett, who also served as executive producers. The show received a mixed reception from critics. Howard Rosenberg of The Los Angeles Times gave the show a largely negative review, criticizing the writing and "thin plot". Anita Gates of The New York Times noted that the animation was "impressive", but at the same time that "there's no heart in it". The Sun Sentinel wrote that the cartoon leaves viewers bored, while in a mostly positive review Entertainment Weekly stated "Invasion is at least as involving as any of the current variations on Star Trek, and handsomer to look at than all of them. B+"
- For Your Love premiered on March 17, 1998, on NBC. The series starred Holly Robinson Peete and James Lesure. It was canceled after six episodes but picked up by The WB. It ran for a total of four-and-a-half seasons, with its last episode airing on August 11, 2002.
- Felicity ran for four seasons from September 29, 1998, to May 22, 2002, with each season corresponding to the traditional American university divisions of freshman, sophomore, junior, and senior years. In 1999, a publicly hyped young writer for the show, Riley Weston, was disclosed as a fraud for claiming to be much younger than she truly was. At the age of 32, she began marketing herself to television studios as a recent high school graduate, passing off her husband as her older brother. She was soon hired by the WB Network as a writer for Felicity. Hailed as a child prodigy and "wunderkind", she was featured on Entertainment Weekly's October 1998 list of the "100 Most Creative People in Entertainment", which described her as an up-and-coming 19-year-old. Shortly thereafter, she was offered a six-figure screenwriting deal with Disney. Her real identity and age were exposed after a Felicity producer checked her social security number. Soon afterward, her contract with WB expired and was not renewed, and her deal with Disney fell through. In the summer of 1999, after filming the first season, Felicity star Keri Russell—known for what The New York Times described as "[t]hat glorious head of voluminous golden backlit hair"—sent the show's producers a photo wearing a short-haired wig. They panicked before learning that it was a joke but then suggested to the actress that a new hairstyle would be appropriate. After being shifted from Tuesday nights at 9:00 PM Eastern to Sunday nights at 8:00 PM Eastern (WB's weakest night) for the 1999–2000 season, the ratings for Felicity declined immediately. This decline occurred before the hair-style change, but the later hair-style change became conflated by some of the public and by some of the popular press and network executives with this earlier event and thus incorrectly blamed the earlier ratings drop partly on the later new hairstyle. After the negative reaction Russell rejected wearing extensions or a wig while her hair grew back. Although storytelling and time-slot changes had already created a ratings decline, a network executive said WB actors' future hair changes would "be given more thought at the network than it previously would have". In 2010, TV Guide Network listed the hairstyle change at No. 19 on their list of "25 Biggest TV Blunders," with several commentators arguing that it was the reason that the ratings of the show dropped. The haircut incident went on to become a popular culture reference within other television shows, both comedic and dramatic. Despite the controversy, Felicity survived for two more seasons.
- Charmed was originally broadcast for eight seasons from October 7, 1998, until May 21, 2006. Charmed achieved a cult following and popularity on The WB with its first episode "Something Wicca This Way Comes" garnering 7.7 million viewers, breaking the record for the network's highest-rated debut episode. The show's ratings, although smaller than rival shows on the "big four" networks (ABC, CBS, NBC, and Fox), were a success for the relatively new and smaller WB network. Charmed went through several timeslot changes during its eight-season run. For its first three seasons in the Wednesday/Thursday 9:00 pm timeslot, Charmed was the second-highest rated series on The WB, behind 7th Heaven. During its fifth season, the show moved to the Sunday 8:00 pm timeslot, where it became the highest-rated Sunday night program in The WB's history. At 178 episodes, Charmed was the second-longest drama broadcast by The WB, behind 7th Heaven. In 2006, it became the longest running hour-long television series featuring all female leads, before being surpassed by Desperate Housewives in 2012. In 1998, when the network began looking for a new drama series for the 1998–99 season, they approached Spelling Television (which had produced the network's then-most successful series, 7th Heaven) to create it. Expanding on the popularity of supernatural-themed dramas such as The Craft (1996) and Practical Magic (1998), the production company explored different forms of mythology to find characters they could realize with contemporary storytelling. Constance M. Burge was hired to create the series as she was under contract with 20th Century Fox and Spelling Television after conceiving the drama series Savannah (1996–97). When the theme of witchcraft was first pitched to her, she was aware of stereotypes of witches (flying brooms, black cats, and warts). After researching Wicca, she changed her perspective and aimed at telling a story of good witches who looked and acted like ordinary people. With this, her initial concept was a series set in Boston, Massachusetts about three friends and roommates who were all witches. However, executive producer E. Duke Vincent lacked confidence, asking "Why would anybody want to watch a show about three witches?" He proposed that the series should focus on family values and developed the series-long mantra of it being about "three sisters who happen to be witches, not three witches who happen to be sisters." Spelling warmed to Burge's ideas and, after the concept was re-crafted to be a series about three sisters (now living in San Francisco) descended from a line of witches, it was pitched to The WB's President of Entertainment, Susanne Daniels, who liked it, allowing the series to begin development. The series was retitled Charmed after Spelling's suggestion of House of Sisters was dropped. Burge wrote the pilot script and a 28-minute version of the pilot was filmed (the "unaired pilot," never aired on network television). After original cast member Lori Rom quit the series before its premiere, Alyssa Milano took over her role and a new pilot had to be filmed. Upon its debut, Charmed received the largest audience for a series premiere in The WB's history. The first season of 22 episodes was picked up by The WB after only two episodes had aired. During the seventh season and for the first time in its history, the show had been in limbo as there was no guaranteed renewal for an eighth season. Charmed was ultimately renewed for a final season, but the budget was cut considerably compared to previous seasons due to expensive special effects and props and highly-paid actresses. Executive producer Brad Kern revealed that they had to cut back on special effects and guest stars, and that the entire season was shot only on the Paramount Studios lot as they could not go out on location anymore. These budget cuts also led to cast member Dorian Gregory being written out of the final season and Brian Krause being written out of several episodes as a cost-saving measure. Kern revealed that the show could not afford to have Krause in all 22 episodes of the final season, but he was brought back for the final two episodes to help bring closure to the storylines. In the United States, Charmed premiered on October 7, 1998, a month after Big Ticket Television's 2nd court show Judge Joe Brown premiered on September 14th of that year and ended on May 21, 2006. The first season aired on Wednesday nights at 9:00 pm. For its second, third and fourth seasons, Charmed moved to Thursday nights. For the fifth season, the series moved to Sunday nights at 8:00 pm and remained there until its eighth and final season. By the end of season eight, Charmed had aired a total of 178 episodes and became the longest running hour-long television series in American history featuring all female leads. Most seasons consisted of 22 episodes, except for the fifth and sixth seasons, which contained 23 episodes, including their double-episode premieres and double-episode finales.
- The Army Show was first shown on September 13 and ended its run on December 13, 1998. The plot follows an army sergeant, played by David Anthony Higgins, who must take charge of a group of soldiers at Fort Bendix, Florida, while hiding his profitable schemes from his higher class officers.
- Hyperion Bay ran for one season from September 21, 1998, to March 8, 1999. According to series writer and co-producer Jeffrey Stepakoff, early into Hyperion Bay's run the network told producers to make the show more hip and with a quicker pace. When series producer and creator Joseph Dougherty refused, he was fired by Warner Bros, and former Melrose Place producer Frank South was brought in to retool the series. Carmen Electra was added to the cast as Sarah Hicks, a character modeled after Heather Locklear's character, Amanda Woodward, on Melrose Place. The changes did not improve ratings and The WB canceled Hyperion Bay in February 1999, with the last episodes airing in March 1999.

=== 1999 ===
Into the late 1990s, The WB began to expand its local broadcast coverage in American media markets that had to rely on the WGN national feed to receive the network's programming through affiliation agreements signed with local broadcast stations (including UPN charter affiliates, leftover independents, former noncommercial stations adopting an entertainment format, and dual affiliations with stations already affiliated with other networks [such as UPN]) within the top-100 media markets after its launch; coverage in the 110 smallest markets was achieved through the September 1998 launch of The WeB (subsequently renamed The WB 100+ Station Group), a packaged feed of WB network and syndicated programs provided to participating cable-based affiliates. With local availability becoming less of an issue and with exclusivity protections being granted by the network to its affiliates in certain markets by this time, on January 27, 1999, Time Warner and Tribune mutually agreed to cease the stopgap WB programming relay over the WGN superstation feed effective that fall. On October 6, when the WGN superstation feed formally stopped carrying WB network programming, Kids' WB programming on weekday mornings and afternoons and on Sunday mornings was replaced with syndicated series, while feature films replaced The WB's prime time programs, resulting in the superstation's schedule more so resembling an independent station than a general entertainment cable network due to the presence of local programming from WGN-TV. The removal of WB programming from the superstation feed reduced The WB's potential audience by 10 million households, and was cited as the reason behind the network's season-to-season ratings decline during the 1999–2000 season, which saw The WB lose an estimated 19% of its household audience as a consequence of the decision and fall to sixth place (behind UPN) in the Nielsen ratings. For similar reasons to those that necessitated the decision to remove WB programming from the channel, WGN America also did not carry any programming from The CW when WGN-TV became its Chicago charter affiliate when that network launched in September 2006, due to the fact that The CW is widely available throughout the United States via over-the-air broadcast stations and affiliations with digital subchannels and local cable outlets (including through The CW Plus in smaller markets) when that network launched in September 2006.

Notable shows

- Zoe, Duncan, Jack and Jane premiered from January 17, 1999, and ended on June 11, 2000. During development, the show was initially known as Zoe Bean and was later retitled Zoe... during its second season. The series aired a total of 26 episodes over its two seasons. The series centered on four eccentric high school friends in New York City. The foursome attended (fictional) Fielding-Mellish Prep, which gets its name from Woody Allen's character in the movie Bananas. The show also starred Mary Page Keller as Zoe's single mother Iris during the first season. Scott Foley, fresh from Dawson's Creek, appeared in the pilot with the intention of having him star in the series as Zoe's love interest. But once the pilot finally got picked up, Foley had already moved on to Felicity. When the show returned for a second season, it had been heavily retooled. The friendship between the four friends remained intact, but now they were adult college students. Gone was Keller as Zoe's mom, while Omar Gooding joined the cast as the foursome's friend Doug Anderson. The title had also been shortened to simply Zoe... (pronounced on-air as Zoe Dot Dot Dot) out of fear that the former title was turning off potential viewers. After the series was cancelled, Michael Rosenbaum expressed disappointment with the fact that the network had cut his character's name out of the title for the second season.
- Movie Stars aired from 1999 to 2000. It stars Harry Hamlin and Jennifer Grant as famous Hollywood actors trying to raise their children.
- Rescue 77 was created by Gregory Widen and aired from March 15 to May 3, 1999. The creator and executive producer was Gregory Widen, a former Southern California firefighter and paramedic, creator of the Highlander franchise, and the writer of the 1991 firefighting drama Backdraft. His goal for the show was to provide a more realistic depiction of the lives of firefighters and paramedics than previous emergency medical television series such as Emergency!
- Safe Harbor aired from September 20 to November 28, 1999. The series was created and executive produced by Brenda Hampton, who at the time was best known for work on the fellow WB series 7th Heaven, the series was paired with 7th Heaven on the network's Monday night lineup. Despite 7th Heaven being the No. 1 show on The WB during the 1999-2000 season, Safe Harbor was unable to hold a solid audience after 7th Heaven and was canceled after ten episodes and one season with the show moving to Sunday nights where the last two episodes aired.
- Jack & Jill ran from September 26, 1999, to April 15, 2001. Due to the average ratings of the first season, the second season was only 13 episodes long and was aired as a midseason show. The final episode detailed the problems during preparations for the couple's wedding. Jacqueline discovered she was pregnant, but before she could tell David, he decided that their relationship was moving too fast and he wanted to call the wedding off and move things slower. Despite the rallying of fans, the series was not renewed for a third season, so the series ended in a cliffhanger.
- Mission Hill ran from September 24, 1999, to July 16, 2000, and on Adult Swim from July 14 to August 11, 2002. Although 18 episodes were planned, only 13 were produced. The series was put on hiatus by the network after two episodes due to poor ratings. It returned in the summer of 2000 but was canceled after four additional episodes. The series went on to develop a cult following, thanks to repeated airings of all 13 episodes on Teletoon's Teletoon Unleashed block; Cartoon Network's popular late-night programming block Adult Swim; and Too Funny To Sleep, a late-night programming block on TBS. Mission Hill was formerly known as The Downtowners, although MTV's production of the similarly titled Downtown forced a name change.
- Brutally Normal premiered on January 24, 2000, with two back-to-back episodes later airing along with Zoe... A total of eight episodes were produced with only five of those episodes airing with the show being canceled on February 14, 2000.
- Angel is a spin-off of the television series Buffy the Vampire Slayer. The series was created by Buffy's creator, Joss Whedon, in collaboration with David Greenwalt. It aired from October 5, 1999, to May 19, 2004, consisting of five seasons and 110 episodes. Like Buffy, it was produced by Whedon's production company, Mutant Enemy. On February 14, 2004, the WB Network announced that Angel would not be brought back for a sixth season. The one-paragraph statement indicated that the news, which had been reported by an Internet site the previous day, had been leaked well before the network intended to make its announcement. Joss Whedon posted a message on a popular fan site, The Bronze: Beta, in which he expressed his dismay and surprise, saying he was "heartbroken" and described the situation as "Healthy Guy Falls Dead From a Heart Attack." Fan reaction was to organize letter-writing campaigns, online petitions, blood and food drives, advertisements in trade magazines and via mobile billboards, and attempts to lobby other networks (UPN was a favorite target, as it had already picked up Buffy). Outrage for the cancellation focused on Jordan Levin, WB's Head of Entertainment. It was the second highest-rated program to be canceled on the WB. Head writer David Fury "guaranteed" that if Joss Whedon had not requested an early renewal, Angel would have been back for a Season 6, saying Whedon's request for an early pick-up decision put Levin in a corner, forcing him to cancel the show, adding simply waiting would have gotten the show renewed. James Marsters made a similar statement, saying cancellation took the cast and production staff "completely by surprise". Angel's final episode, "Not Fade Away", aired on the WB on May 19, 2004. The ambiguous final moments left some fans hoping for the continuation of Angel and the Buffyverse in the future - hopes that came to fruition in November 2007 with the publication of the first issue of the comic book series Angel: After the Fall. The series is Joss Whedon's official continuation of the Angel television series and follows in the footsteps of the comic book Buffy the Vampire Slayer Season Eight, whose first issue was published in March 2007.
- Popular was produced by Touchstone Television and ran for two seasons from September 29, 1999, to May 18, 2001.

== 2000s ==
=== 2000 ===
- D.C. only ran from April 2 to 23, 2000.
- Young Americans debuted on July 12, 2000 as a summer replacement for, and spin-off from another Columbia TriStar Television production, Dawson's Creek. The series was originally ordered for the 1999–2000 television season with a planned fall debut, but was delayed due to unresolved matters between Columbia TriStar and The WB and Coca-Cola offered to sponsor the show. The main character, Will Krudski, was introduced late in season three of Dawson's Creek as a childhood friend of the group who has kept in contact with Pacey Witter. The character of Will Krudski was then written into Dawson's Creek to associate Young Americans with one of The WB's established shows. When Dawson's Creek went on hiatus in the summer of 2000, Young Americans occupied its timeslot of Wednesdays at 9 P.M. Repeats were shown at 9 P.M. on Fridays. The Coca-Cola Company paid $6 million to be the primary sponsor, the show being billed as "Coca-Cola Presents Young Americans". Young Americans was profiled by Steve Carell on the August 22, 2000, episode of The Daily Show in the Ad Nauseam segment due to the Coca-Cola tie ins. Carell constantly referred to "The Beginning" as an "hour-long commercial". Some of the scenes also took place in a Friendly's restaurant, which was built from an old pizzeria for the show. Coca-Cola products are seen or mentioned in most episodes. The unaired pilot episode does not contain the product placement. Among the changes to the pilot is a scene that was reshot in order to show the characters drinking Coca-Cola. A scene from the pilot, which was heavily promoted prior to the show's premiere, where the characters and other students at Rawley run in slow motion to the school's lake while stripping off their clothes was parodied in another WB show, Grosse Pointe.
- The first eight episodes of Baby Blues originally aired between July 28 and August 24, 2000, before being cancelled. The five remaining episodes that had been unaired finally did air on Adult Swim in 2002. A second season consisting of thirteen episodes was produced but never aired. Warner Bros. Animation produced eight of the 13 aired episodes, with overseas animation done by Varga Studio in Hungary for five of them (including the pilot), and Sunwoo Entertainment in Korea for the three others. Rough Draft Studios in Los Angeles did five episodes, which include "Bizzy Moves In", "Rodney Has Two Daddies", "Hurtin' Inside", "Ugly Zoe", and "Wanda Moves Up". In another attempt to compete with Fox's popular animated sitcoms, The WB made the series to be more adult-oriented than the comic strip (by having some sexuality, mild swearing, etc.). Because Rick Kirkman and Jerry Scott had limited creative control over the animated version, they were not completely pleased about this kind of difference, though Scott said he liked "part of it". The Baby Blues animated series took nearly five years to develop and produce, and what was initially the pilot, "A Baby Blues Christmas Special" was supposed to air in December 1998, but it was postponed more than once, while other episodes were being ordered and completed. The Christmas episode finally aired on Adult Swim on February 24, 2002. In 1999, the series was almost to be retitled Bluesville, without Scott's knowledge but Baby Blues was kept as the title, given how popular the comic strip is with more than 60 million readers. In September 2000, Warner Bros. announced that a second season would be produced. Although a second season was produced, consisting of 13 additional episodes, it never aired. The WB typically aired two episodes each week, thus enabling eight different episodes to be shown in the five-week run, but abandoned plans to air additional episodes which had been completed. Previously unaired episodes were later aired on Cartoon Network's late night programming block, Adult Swim, and on Teletoon in Canada.
- The original run of The PJs debuted on Fox on Sunday, January 10, 1999, following the network's coverage of the NFC Divisional Playoffs. Two days later, the second episode aired in its regular Tuesday night time slot, following King of the Hill. 44 episodes aired during the show's run of 2 years and 4 months. Each took over 2 months to produce, owing to the laborious stop-motion process. After two seasons on Fox, the show moved to The WB in 2000. Its high budget and declining ratings led to its cancellation in 2001; the final 2 episodes weren't aired until 2003.
- Hype ran for 17 episodes from October 8, 2000, to February 18, 2001. The series was ordered by the WB after the trio wrote a sketch for MADtv which parodied Felicity, the network's major hit series at the time. On February 8, 2001, the series was canceled after one season, although two of its cast members, Frank Caliendo and Daniele Gaither, subsequently joined MADtv, while Gavin Crawford has had success as a television comedian in Canada, including on The Gavin Crawford Show and This Hour Has 22 Minutes.
- Nikki aired from October 9, 2000, to January 27, 2002. Nikki was a starring vehicle for Nikki Cox, who had previously starred in another WB sitcom, Unhappily Ever After, which ran for five seasons. Looking to capitalize on Cox's popularity, Bruce Helford created a sitcom that featured her as the title character. In July 1999, The WB placed a straight-to-order series from The Drew Carey Show co-creator Bruce Helford as a vehicle for Unhappily Ever After and Norm co-star Nikki Cox. Nikki was formally ordered to series in May 2000, and was placed on The WB's fall lineup for a Sunday Night comedy block. On October 31, 2000, The WB ordered a full 22-episode season of Nikki. The network renewed the show for a 22-episode second season at its upfronts in May 2001. However, in January 2002, the network pulled the series, and shut down production after only 19 episodes. Six episodes were left unaired in the United States.
- Grosse Pointe aired from September 22, 2000, to February 18, 2001, during the 2000–2001 television season. Created by Darren Star, it was a satire depicting the behind-the-scenes drama on the set of a television show, and was inspired in large part by Star's experiences as the creator and producer of the nighttime soap Beverly Hills, 90210. Reportedly, Beverly Hills 90210 producer Aaron Spelling called WB executive Jamie Kellner to complain about Lindsay Sloane's character Marcy Sternfeld, who in the original pilot was a thinly veiled parody of Spelling's daughter, actress Tori Spelling. Grosse Pointe was on the WB's Friday line-up in between Sabrina the Teenage Witch and Popular. The show lost much of the lead-in audience, and was moved to Sundays (a joke in the episode "The Opposite of Sex" references this, as the fictional show garners its highest ratings ever but fails to "beat Sabrina"). Grosse Pointe was canceled in February 2001 after 17 episodes.
- Gilmore Girls debuted on October 5, 2000, and became a flagship series for the network. Gilmore Girls originally ran for seven seasons, the final season moving to The CW and ending its run on May 15, 2007. Television critics praised Gilmore Girls for its witty dialogue, cross-generational appeal, and effective mix of humor and drama. It never drew large ratings but was a relative success for The WB, peaking during season five as the network's second most-popular show. The series has been in daily syndication since 2004, while a growing and dedicated fandom has led to its status as a cult classic. Since coming off the air, Gilmore Girls has been cited in TV (The Book) and Time magazine as one of the 100 greatest television shows of all time. Gilmore Girls' first season commenced on The WB in the Thursday 8pm/7pm Central time slot, as a lead-in for Charmed. Renewed for a second season, the show was relocated to Tuesdays at 8 pm/7pm, the time slot of Buffy the Vampire Slayer, which transferred to UPN, and served as a lead-in for Smallville, which became an instant hit and would always beat Gilmore Girls, its lead-in in the ratings. During seasons 4 and 5, it led into One Tree Hill, which slowly became a hit. In season 6, it led into Supernatural, which became another hit for The WB. First-season reruns aired on Monday nights from March 5 until April 9, 2001, during a mid-season hiatus of Roswell lead out of 7th Heaven to spread audience awareness. An additional run of the first season aired in 2002 on Sunday nights under the title Gilmore Girls Beginnings (which featured a modified opening sequence voiced with a monologue detailing the premise from Graham), and was one of two shows on The WB to give the Beginnings in its title for reruns, along with 7th Heaven.
- Sabrina the Teenage Witch's first four seasons aired on ABC from September 27, 1996, to May 5, 2000; the final three seasons ran on The WB from September 22, 2000, to April 24, 2003. During its four-year run on ABC, Sabrina was the highest-rated series among the network's TGIF line-up. In the 2000–2001 season, the show moved after a negotiation dispute with ABC. While ABC was willing to renew the show for a fifth season, the network was not willing to commit to further seasons beyond season five. Viacom Productions, which produced the show, wanted an increased fee (up from $1 million per episode); ABC offered $1.2 million per episode. The WB then picked up the show for $650,000 per episode, but committed to two seasons, provided the show met ratings goals. For the show's seventh and final season, The WB initially only ordered 13 episodes in spring 2002 before committing to a full 22-episode season that November.

=== 2001 ===
Notable shows

- The Oblongs premiered on April 1, 2001, but failed to find an audience. On May 20, 2001, The WB aired "Disfigured Debbie," the second episode produced, as the season finale, leaving five episodes unaired. Reruns of the first eight episodes, and the five remaining episodes, aired on Cartoon Network's late-night programming block, Adult Swim, in 2002. In Canada, the series airs on Teletoon as part of "Teletoon Unleashed". A total of 13 episodes were produced.
- Dead Last aired from August 14 to September 25, 2001. It starred Sara Downing as Jane Cahill, Tyler Labine as Scotty Sallback, and Kett Turton as Vaughn Parrish. The series ran for one season with 13 episodes produced, but only six episodes were aired by the network before the series was cancelled.
- Reruns of Ripley's Believe It or Not! began airing on in September 2001, and were expected to continue until December 2001.
- Men, Women & Dogs premiered October 14, 2001. Ken Tucker of Entertainment Weekly described the series as the "most insultingly moronic, sniggering sitcom of the year".
- Off Centre aired from October 14, 2001, to October 31, 2002. Created by Chris Weitz, Paul Weitz, and Danny Zuker, the series was heavily promoted as "from the guys who brought you American Pie". The show aired on Sundays in its first season, and was renewed for a second season to be part of a new Thursday night comedy block. However, the move to Thursday did not help the lowly-rated show, and it was cancelled seven episodes into the second season, leaving two episodes ("Scary Sitcom" and "Chau's Hard Iced Tea") unfilmed. While it aired, the show was controversial for its raunchy content, as topics addressed included threesomes, circumcision, pornography and masturbation. On March 4, 2002, as the show faced pressure from watchdog groups such as the Parents Television Council (which voted Off Centre the second worst show for family viewing in 2002), The New York Post printed a memo from the WB's Standards and Practices Department to the creators of the show that stated: "It is essential to reduce and/or modify the significant number of uses of 'penis,' 'testicles,' 'foreskin' as well as euphemisms for the same, such as 'your thingie,'" the memo says in part. It also orders the exclusion of such references as "covered wagon", "unit", "turtleneck", "little fella", "anteater", "diddy", "cloaking device" and "my pig is still snuggly, wrapped in his doughy blanket." The episode which dealt with circumcision, "The Unkindest Cut", came under fire because of its treatment of the character Euan, who is British and has not been circumcised (the procedure is not routine and is uncommon in Europe and other parts of the world including Asia and South America), as well as the treatment of uncircumcised men in general.
- Smallville premiered on October 16, 2001. After Smallville's fifth season, The WB and UPN merged to form The CW, the series' later United States broadcaster. Smallville, which ended its tenth and final season on May 13, 2011, follows Clark Kent (Tom Welling) in the fictional town of Smallville, Kansas, before he becomes The Man of Steel/Superman. For the next five seasons the series moved from Tuesday at 9:00 pm to Wednesday at 8:00 pm and eventually to Thursday at 8:00 pm. In 2006, before the start of Smallville's sixth season, it was announced The WB and UPN would merge into The CW and the series would make the move to the new network. During its seventh season, the series aired in Canada a day earlier than it did in the United States. On May 21, 2009, it was announced that Smallville's ninth season would move to Friday at 8:00 pm, considered the "death slot" for television programs. By the end of its tenth season it was the longest-running science-fiction TV show in the United States, breaking the record held by Stargate SG-1. Smallville set a WB record as its highest-rated series debut, with 8.4 million viewers tuned in for the pilot. Its premiere set a WB record for adults aged 18–34 and finished first among viewers aged 12–34, with Warner Bros. president Jordan Levin crediting the series with invigorating the network's Tuesday-night lineup. Smallville appeared on the cover of Entertainment Weekly as one of five new shows to watch. After its first season, the series was sixth on the Parents Television Council's 10-best list of broadcast programs. Levin, acknowledging early concerns that Smallville had become a villain of the week series, said that season two would introduce "smaller mini-arcs over three to four episodes" and become less of a "serialized show".
- Maybe It's Me first aired on October 5, 2001, and ended on May 3, 2002. During the network's upfront presentation that season, the show was originally titled Maybe I'm Adopted, but following negative feedback, the show was re-titled. The show was unique in that it featured pop-up graphics on the screen, a concept originally proposed by Stan Rogow for another Disney-produced comedy series, Lizzie McGuire.
- Raising Dad aired from October 5, 2001, to May 10, 2002. The series stars Bob Saget, Kat Dennings, Brie Larson, Riley Smith, Beau Wirick and Jerry Adler. and was produced by Albion Productions in association with Paramount Television. Carole Horst of Variety reviewed the first episode of Raising Dad and wrote: "a family trying to cope with the death of the mother... isn't funny, but it is touching at times", and added that the cast "is fine, and "Dad" shows some promise. It probably will keep "Reba's" audience tuned in to end a nice family night of TV."
- Reba is a sitcom starring Reba McEntire that aired from October 5, 2001, to May 5, 2006, and on The CW from November 19, 2006, to February 18, 2007. The show was initially a casualty of the merger that formed The CW. However, in an 11th hour move on May 17, 2006, The CW renewed Reba with a 13-episode order, reportedly to fulfill a syndication contract worth $20 million. In November 2006, The CW announced that the show would be paired with 7th Heaven, Sundays at 7:00 p.m., beginning later that month. Reba encores were scheduled for Sundays at 7:00 p.m. ET/PT, with a new episode at 7:30 p.m. Reba became the top-rated sitcom on the CW, also surpassing the dramas Supernatural, One Tree Hill, and Veronica Mars. The final episode aired on February 18, 2007. Reba set a new all-time viewership record for any program on the WB's Friday night (best-ever Friday in women 18–49). During its five seasons on the Friday night lineup, it often ranked 4th in its timeslot (ahead of both UPN and Fox), with a few episodes bringing in over 5 million viewers. Reba's premiere on The CW Sunday averaged 4.02 million viewers, including 1.64 million viewers and 40 percent among adults 18–49 more than when Everybody Hates Chris and All of Us premiered in the same time slot, thus making Reba the highest rated sitcom on the network. With Reba as a lead-in, 7th Heaven saw a season high of 4.51 million viewers. Reba was averaging 3,630,000 viewers since the beginning of its sixth season, making it the seventh most-watched show and the most-watched sitcom on The CW throughout the 2006–07 television season. The new Reba episodes vary as being either sixth or seventh most-watched program on the network, sometimes ranking as high as #3 for the week. Throughout The CW's inaugural season (2006–07), no other program had higher viewer turnout for repeat airings than Reba. As a result of the lackluster ratings for encores of the summer drama Hidden Palms, repeats of Reba returned to the CW's schedule in June 2007 after being absent for three months, and they immediately became the most-watched program of the night. Later in the summer, repeats of Reba were the most-viewed program on the CW network.

=== 2002 ===
The WB began broadcasting in high-definition in September 2002, offering a total of five hours of prime time shows in the format for the 2002–03 season. The initial lineup of shows presented in HD included Family Affair, Everwood, Reba and Smallville.

Notable shows

- The Jamie Kennedy Experiment is a half-hour-long hidden camera/practical joke reality television series that debuted in 2002. The host and star of the show is Jamie Kennedy, a comedian who presented a reality TV format which combined hidden camera with sketch comedy. The show was a production of Bahr-Small Productions in association with Warner Bros. Television and Big Ticket Television and ran from January 13, 2002, until April 29, 2004.
- Glory Days was broadcast from January 16 to March 25, 2002. Kevin Williamson originally conceived Glory Days as a drama in the same vein as his first series, Dawson's Creek, and a pilot was produced using this format. After picking up the series, The WB asked Williamson to retool the show and turn it into a mystery series instead. The characters and relationships remained the same but a whodunit spin was added.
- My Guide to Becoming a Rock Star premiered March 14, 2002. It is based on the UK series The Young Person's Guide to Becoming a Rock Star.
- A network version of ElimiDate aired concurrently with the syndicated run called ElimiDate Deluxe for the 2001–2002 season, but was dropped after just a few airings.
- Everwood aired from September 16, 2002, to June 5, 2006, with a total of 89 episodes spanning four seasons. It was canceled on May 17, 2006, a casualty of the merger to form The CW. Everwood's series finale, which aired on Monday, June 5, 2006, was seen by 4.07 million viewers. The final episode, "Foreverwood", was written as both a season and a series finale. With the series future uncertain, the producers wrote two endings: the aired version, as well as additional scenes where Madison showed up to cause some cliffhanger trouble. Originally, the producers had scripted a montage for the "series-finale cut" that went forty years into the future to show a majority of the gang at Andy's funeral—showing the series coming full circle; this was never filmed due to budgetary reasons as well as the producers' hopes that they would receive a fifth season. Everwood was canceled in favor of a new show, Runaway, which Dawn Ostroff then canceled after only three episodes had been shown, and for a new season of 7th Heaven, which had just had its series finale. The finale of 7th Heaven had 7 million viewers. Everwood had an average of 4 million viewers (which, if it was sustained, would have put it in the top 5 CW ratings for the following year). Robert Bianco for USA Today was not enthusiastic about the show's premiere and gave it a two-star rating out of four. He found that Everwood's main problem was that it "never knows when the corn syrup is thick enough" due to its clichés. On the more positive side, he wrote, "Clearly, WB's goal here is to find an acceptable time-period companion for 7th Heaven, and it's entirely possible the network has. The scenery is pretty, Smith has the earmarks of a star in the making, and Williams actually is quite appealing—when the script isn't forcing him to behave as if he were insane." Advocacy group the Parents Television Council ranked Everwood as the group's No. 1 "worst network TV show for family viewing" on their list of the 2003–04 season. The PTC criticized "the careless and irresponsible treatment of sexual issues—especially when the teenaged characters are involved" and stated "Everwood's reckless messages about sex without consequences are expressly targeted to impressionable teens." Entertainment Weekly reviewed positively the show's third season in 2005 giving it an "A−" and commented, "Everwood's soap tropes—unexpected pregnancy, adultery—handles these stories artfully."
- Family Affair is a television comedy that aired from September 12, 2002, to March 13, 2003. The WB canceled the series after only airing thirteen of the fifteen episodes produced. The series was created as a remake of the original 1966–1971 Family Affair television series. It was produced by Pariah Films and Turner Television, with Bob Young, Gavin Polone, Sid and Marty Krofft, and Randy Pope acting as the series' executive producers. It was filmed in the same CBS Studio City lot as the original series. It was picked up to series by The WB in May 2002, when it was announced that the series would anchor a new Thursday night comedy block for the network. Luke Benward originally played the role of Jody in the series pilot, but was replaced by Jimmy "Jax" Pinchak as Jody in subsequent episodes. Family Affair earned a full season, when The WB gave the series a back-nine episode order in October 2002, but suffered low viewership soon after. In November 2002, The WB reversed course and cut the episode order for Family Affair by three episodes, and then soon after changed the episode order to just two additional episodes, for a total production order of 15 episodes rather than 22 or 19. The series was then pulled from the air in December 2002 due to low ratings. The series returned with new episodes in late February 2003, airing after Sabrina the Teenage Witch. By late March 2003, Family Affair was again pulled from the air and was generally considered to be "done". The WB officially passed on a second season of the series in May 2003.
- Do Over was originally broadcast from September 19 to December 5, 2002, and it stars Penn Badgley. The show originally aired on the WB Network in 2002. It was scheduled on Thursdays at 8:30 EST. Unfortunately, the show was pitted against CBS's Survivor and NBC's Scrubs. Although the show had a devoted fan base, it suffered from low ratings and was cancelled after showing eleven of fifteen episodes. The entire series, including the final four episodes, aired on Channel 4 in Great Britain in September 2008.
- What I Like About You ran from September 20, 2002, to March 24, 2006, with a total of 86 episodes produced and aired. With the exception of a brief period early in the second season, What I Like About You was a headline on The WB's Friday Night Comedy Lineup. From April to September 2006, the show held an hourlong slot on Daytime WB afternoon programming block alongside 8 Simple Rules. When The CW launched in September 2006, reruns of the series moved to the new network's CW Daytime block, remaining until September 2008.
- Greetings from Tucson aired from September 20, 2002, to May 9, 2003, during the 2002-2003 season. Though reviews were mixed, critics applauded the abilities of the mostly-Latino cast, calling the show "a welcome addition to TV's largely white landscape," and compared its premise to I Love Lucy, The Jeffersons and the thought-provoking 1970s comedies of Norman Lear.

=== 2003 ===
Notable shows

- High School Reunion is a reality television series chronicling real-life high school reunions. The program originally aired for two seasons between 2003 and 2005, and featured reunions of classes after ten years.
- Black Sash ran from March 30 to June 1, 2003. Including pilots, a total of eight episodes were made, however only six episodes were aired. About the show's failure, one of the show's producer, Carlton Cuse said: "I think everyone involved made a noble effort, but at the end of the day it just wasn't a TV show that worked. Most don't!"
- Despite the series debut of Birds of Prey garnering ratings of 7.6 million viewers (at the time, the network's largest premiere in the 18–34 demographic), the series was canceled after ratings fell sharply in subsequent weeks. Thirteen episodes were produced and aired in total.
- The Surreal Life is a reality television series that records a group of celebrities as they live together in Glen Campbell's former mansion in the Hollywood Hills for two weeks. The format of the show resembles that of The Real World and Road Rules, in that the cameras not only record the castmates' participation in group activities assigned to them, but also their interpersonal relationships and conflicts. The series is also likened to The Challenge in that previously known individuals from separate origins of entertainment are brought together into one cast. The show's first two seasons aired on The WB, and subsequent seasons on VH1.
- On the Spot is a short-lived sketch comedy series which aired during early 2003. The show consisted of a mixture of scripted sketches and improvisational comedy.
- The O'Keefes premiered on May 22, 2003, and ended on June 12, 2003. The series was about the O'Keefe family: Harry and Ellie, together with their children, Lauren, Danny and Mark. The plot centered on the fact that the O'Keefe parents had homeschooled their children for most of their lives and with the dramatic and comic interest arising in situations where the children were beginning to experience the outside world. There was a lot of controversy about this show among parents who homeschool their children, as they felt it portrayed homeschooling in a negative light.
- Grounded for Life debuted on January 10, 2001, as a mid-season replacement on Fox. It was created by Mike Schiff and Bill Martin. It ran for two seasons on the network until being cancelled only two episodes into its third season. It was immediately picked up for the rest of the third season by The WB, where it aired for two additional seasons until the series ended on January 28, 2005. Ninety-one complete episodes were produced and aired between 2000 and 2005. However, not all episodes were broadcast in the exact order they were produced.
- Tarzan premiered on October 5, 2003, and ended on November 23, 2003. Based on the Tarzan series by Edgar Rice Burroughs and developed by Eric Kripke, Mike Werb and Michael Colleary, the show was set in New York City and depicted modern-day adaptations of Burroughs' characters. In December 2003, the series was canceled after eight episodes. Kripke was critical of the show, calling it "a piece of crap" and saying: "I'll stand behind the pilot. It has a beginning, middle, and -- the problem -- it ends. I was hungry to have anything in production, so I wrote a 50-page story that ended. Then it got made and I had something in production, and it was all my dreams come true. They said to me, 'Let's do 12 more.' I said, 'Uh, wait! What's the story?' So, Tarzan was a hell ride in every way, and we only did eight before they wisely put us out of our misery." On Metacritic the show has a score of 45% based on reviews from 21 critics, indicating "mixed or average reviews".
- Steve Harvey's Big Time Challenge aired from 2003 to 2005, hosted by Steve Harvey. In each episode, performers compete for a $10,000 prize.
- The WB's Superstar USA is a television show that spoofed the popular show American Idol. Essentially its polar opposite, Superstar USA told contestants they were looking for the best singer when they were actually looking for the worst. One producer, worried that the live audience members would be unable to respectfully compose themselves during the final performances, falsely informed them that the singers were all terminally ill young people who were having a wish fulfilled by a charitable organization. The Los Angeles Times reported the said organization as the Make a Wish Foundation, which later received an apology from the WB. In an interview with USA Today, executive producer Mike Fleiss straightened out the details: "First of all, it was me. But I did not say 'Make-A-Wish.' I said, 'Who's heard of the One Wish Foundation?' and people raised their hands. There is no One Wish Foundation. It was a prank on top of a prank. It was the only way to get it to work."
- One Tree Hill premiered on September 23, 2003. It was one of the series to make the jump to The CW, and aired there from season four until the end of its run in 2012. The series premiered to 2.5 million viewers and rose to 3.3 million in its second week, becoming one of only three shows to rise in their second episode during the 2003–2004 television season. Season one went on to average 3.5 million viewers, and the second season was the highest rated in the series, averaging 4.3 million viewers weekly and a 1.9 Adults 18–49 rating. The CW only attracts a fraction of the audience its competitors do. "So the strategy is super-serving a young coveted demographics. The network's sweet spot is women 18–34 and with a viewer median age of 33, it boasts the youngest audience among its broadcast competitors by almost a dozen years." Averaging 4.3 million viewers weekly, season two was One Tree Hill's highest-rated season. During this season, the show emerged as one of The WB's hits. "Of all the shows that they've launched in the last two years, this one has the most traction", said Stacey Lynn Koerner, at the time an executive vice president at Initiative, a media planning agency. "It does have an audience it's connecting with – a loyal audience that comes back week in and week out." The show was particularly popular among the young viewership. It became the first choice of prime-time television for teenage girls and was reported in January 2005 to be the program in Tuesday's 9 pm time slot most viewed by women aged 12 to 34.
- All About the Andersons aired from September 12, 2003, to February 12, 2004. It lasted one season before being canceled.
- Run of the House aired between September 11, 2003, and May 7, 2004. Nineteen episodes were produced but only sixteen were aired before the show was cancelled. The final three episodes that were unaired in the United States were aired in the UK on the Trouble Network at the end of 2004 and were repeated during the end of 2007 and early 2008.
- Like Family aired from September 19, 2003, to April 22, 2004. The series stars Holly Robinson Peete and Kevin Michael Richardson and lasted one season. Like Family was created and produced by Dan Fogelman, and executive produced by Warren Littlefield, Kenny Schwartz, and Rick Weiner.

=== 2004 ===
Notable shows

- Summerland premiered on June 1, 2004. The series ran for a total of 26 episodes over two seasons. Its cancellation was announced on May 15, 2005 and the last episode aired on July 18, 2005. On May 15, 2005, the network released early information on their 2005–2006 season. Summerland, along with eight other shows, were canceled. Jesse McCartney responded to the cancellation in an interview, saying the show was "in a crazy time slot and...the writers were having trouble, and it was just a bad call."
- Columbia TriStar Television optioned the television rights for Fearless in 1999 and a pilot episode was filmed for The WB for the Fall 2003 television season. The series would have starred Rachael Leigh Cook as Gaia, who would now be a 23-year-old field agent for the FBI. The show was never aired, as producer Jerry Bruckheimer pulled the show due to various concerns and the time slot was later filled with One Tree Hill. Warren Ellis later reviewed the pilot episode and criticized it as "too unfocussed [sic] to make consistently engaging television, and I think it's the wrong composition of concepts to hook the young audience I assume they're playing for."
- Blue Collar TV aired from July 29, 2004, to July 26, 2006. The lead actors Jeff Foxworthy, Bill Engvall, and Larry the Cable Guy. The show's humor dealt principally with contemporary American society, and especially hillbilly, redneck, and Southern stereotypes. The show was greenlighted on the heels of the success of the Blue Collar Comedy Tour, which the series' three lead actors toured with in the early to mid-2000s. Blue Collar TV returned on May 31, 2006, to finish airing its second season throughout the summer as filler for the final weeks of the WB, which would shut down later that year. The show did not move to The CW. In summer 2006, Foxworthy started his own show, Foxworthy's Big Night Out, which aired on Country Music Television and retained some aspects of the Blue Collar TV format. It was canceled after one season.
- Studio 7 airedduring the summer of 2004. The WB originally ordered two seasons of Studio 7, with the second season to air immediately after the first. However, the network cancelled plans for a second season during the initial run, due to low ratings.
- The Help premiered on March 5, 2004. The network only aired seven episodes, the show ending on April 16, 2004, and canceled it in May 2004. The premiere of The Help was the most watched program in the Friday 9:30–10:00 time slot on The WB in the 2003–04 season. The premiere was more popular among women than men aged 12–34 (2.0/8 versus 1.3/5). Despite the premiere being the best performance in the time slot of the season on The WB the critics have nothing positive to say. Virginia Heffernan of The New York Times said the show "comes off like a school play, clumsily blocked, loudly acted and nearly shouted down by obligatory laughter and applause". Robert Bianco of USA Today pointed out that "this is the kind of show that opens with a doggie-doo joke and still finds a way to go downhill". Perhaps the harshest was Matthew Gilbert of The Boston Globe: "The WB's claim that 'The Help' is a 'biting satire' is only half true. No, it's not a satire, but yes, it does indeed bite. And it will be biting the dust before long, unless it can find a new cast, new writers, new producers, a new set, and an entirely new premise." In her review of the 2003–04 season Kay McFadden, television critic for The Seattle Times, classified The Help as "Never should have aired".
- Jack & Bobby aired from September 12, 2004, to May 11, 2005. On May 17, 2005, The WB announced it would not renew Jack & Bobby for a second season.
- The Mountain was broadcast for one season from September 22, 2004, to January 2, 2005. The show received very low ratings and was canceled after only thirteen episodes.
- The Starlet premiered on March 26, 2005. Ten young actresses lived together in a home formerly owned by Marilyn Monroe, while competing in a series of acting challenges for the chance to win a role on the WB drama One Tree Hill and a management contract with 3 Arts Entertainment. The eventual winner was 18-year-old Michelynne McGuire, with Mercedes Connor as the runner up. The Starlet was cancelled on April 5, 2005, after only 1 season of 6 episodes.
- Drew Carey's Green Screen Show premiered on The WB on October 7, 2004. Coinciding with the show's debut, Carey participated in a number of promotional appearances, such as guest hosting The Late Late Show, and starring in a special episode of Blue Collar TV, Green Screen's lead-in program. On November 8, after having run five episodes, The WB announced that it was temporarily pulling "Drew Carey's Green Screen Show" from its schedule for November sweeps after it averaged 2.7 million viewers per week. It was confirmed as cancelled in May 2005 at their 2005-06 fall presentation. As a result, Drew Carey and executive producer Ron Diamond, took the show to Comedy Central, returning it to the air on September 26, 2005.

=== 2005 ===
Michigan J. Frog was the official mascot of the network from its inception in 1995 until 2005. The network's first night of programming on January 11, 1995, began with Bugs Bunny and Daffy Duck wondering which one of them would pull the switch to launch The WB. The camera then panned over to Chuck Jones drawing Michigan on an easel; when Jones finished, Michigan leapt from the drawing to formally launch The WB.

Michigan also would usually appear before the opening of shows, informing the viewer of the TV rating. Before the beginning of Savannah, for example, the frog would sing a short monologue suggesting that "[t]here's more comedy for the family Wednesday nights" and that kids should go to bed, meaning that the show coming on would be for mature audiences only. In later shows like Buffy the Vampire Slayer and Angel, the announcer would present a TV-PG disclaimer, though the frog still appeared as a neon sign.

On July 22, 2005, Michigan's "death" was announced by WB Chairman Garth Ancier at a fall season preview with the terse statement "The frog is dead and buried." The head of programming for The WB, David Janollari, stated that "[Michigan] was a symbol that perpetuated the young teen feel of the network. That's not the image we [now] want to put out to our audience."

Notable shows

- Following the second season, the American version of Beauty and the Geek moved to The CW, the new network formed when both The WB and UPN ceased operations in September 2006. The two-hour season premiere for the third season aired Wednesday, January 3, 2007, at 8:00 p.m. EST on The CW. The fourth season premiered on September 18, making BATG the first series to premiere for the CW for the 2007-08 television season. Beauty and the Geek was renewed for a fifth season, which premiered on March 12, 2008. After the fifth season, the show was put on indefinite hiatus in order to stoke renewed interest in the show, and perhaps the addition of innovative twists to the format. In October 2008, casting began for a sixth season, scheduled to air on MTV, with minor celebrities as the beauties. However, a sixth season never materialized.
- Living with Fran debuted on April 8, 2005, and ran two seasons before ending on March 24, 2006. The series was originally titled Shacking Up, and was ordered to series by The WB for the 2004–05 television season, though it ultimately did not premiere in fall 2004 and was held for midseason. The early tapings of the show frustrated star Fran Drescher, and the series' original showrunners were replaced before the show ever aired. It was not renamed until very close to its premiere; episodes of television entertainment shows like Extra can be found on the internet discussing the show with the cast and previewing clips while still calling it Shacking Up. The premiere episode of Living with Fran airing at 8:30 p.m. on April 8, 2005, drew 3.1 million viewers and a 1.3 rating/5 share in adults 18–49 in preliminary ratings, improving on the ratings of its lead-in What I Like About You, while the followup episode of the show that the same evening at 9:30 p.m. retained approximately 90% of the audience from its lead-in Reba. The series was considered a "solid" performer in its first season according to Variety's Rick Kissell. On October 18, 2005, The WB removed Living with Fran from its Friday night schedule, replacing with the new series Twins, indicating that the series was just being put on hiatus and that the remaining nine episodes of the second season would air at a later date. The show returned Friday, January 13, 2006, at 8:30 p.m. The second-season finale aired on Friday, March 24, 2006. In the episode, Riley proposed to Fran; the episode was a cliffhanger, and Fran's answer was not revealed. On May 17, 2006, one day before the upfronts, it was announced that Living with Fran would not be returning for a third season in fall 2006 on the new CW network, which was the result of the merger of the former WB and UPN networks.
- Supernatural; was first broadcast on September 13, 2005, on The WB, and subsequently became part of successor The CW's lineup. The pilot was viewed by an estimated 5.69 million viewers, and the ratings of the first four episodes prompted The WB to pick up the series for a full season. Rather than having the series debut on television, The WB instead made the pilot episode available for online streaming through Yahoo! a week before it was set to premiere on the network as part of a promotional scheme. Following the transition to The CW, Supernatural episodes were added to Apple's iTunes Store starting in December 2006, being one of the first CW series to be made available for sale online. The following month, the network began streaming episodes of the series on its website with limited commercial interruption, available for up to four weeks after the initial airings. After the first four episodes of Supernatural aired in 2005, the WB decided to pick up the series for a full season of 22 episodes. During those first episodes, the series was ranked third in males aged 18–34 and 12–34. It also posted an increase of 73% in males aged 18–49 from the year before, although it only gained 4% in total viewers, and retained 91% of viewers from its lead-in, Gilmore Girls. Supernatural had low ratings during its second season, with viewers consisting mainly of teen girls, and the CW trying to attract more male viewers. The show's future was in doubt at the end of the second season. Despite mediocre ratings in the previous year, it was back for a third season. Although its third season's rating were low, it did well with viewers aged 18–49. In this category, it ranked eighth of all returning series broadcast by a major network. The show received an early pickup for its fourth season. The show's ratings increased in its fourth season. The fourth-season premiere aired on September 18, 2008, averaging its highest rating ever since its debut on The CW with 3.96 million viewers, a 33% surge over the season three premiere and a 1.7/5 in adults 18–49, up 42% from one year earlier. On October 16, 2008, the show was watched by 3.06 million viewers, making the lowest rating for the season. On October 30, 2008, the show climbed to its best performance in adults 18–34 (1.4/4), adults 18–49 (1.5/4) and total viewers (3.6mil) since its season premiere on September 18, 2008. For the fifth-season premiere, viewership increased by 6% in women 18–34 (1.7/5) over the fourth-season premiere. However, taking DVR viewings into account with new Live-Plus 7 Day data, total viewership for the premiere increased 38%, with women 18–34 increasing by 35% and adults 18–34 by 47%. The advertisements The WB chose for the show went beyond just commercials and billboards. Before the series debuted, the network placed signs for the show at gas station pumps, and gave out rubber glow-in-the-dark bracelets at New York and Los Angeles movie theaters. Also, coffee cup sleeves revealed the image of a "terrified woman seemingly pinned to a ceiling" when heated were distributed to 500 cafes throughout New York, Chicago, and Los Angeles. The same image was used in special mirrors the network installed in almost 200 nightclubs throughout three cities in order to reach "young, hip horror fans". Additional advertisements were also placed in bars, movie theaters, and video game stores, with hundreds of the bars also receiving Supernatural napkins and coasters.
- Just Legal premiered on September 19, 2005, and was canceled on October 3, 2005, after three episodes had been aired. Almost a year later, The WB burned off five additional episodes on Sundays following a repeat of the pilot on August 6, 2006, at 7:00 pm Eastern Standard Time/6:00 pm CST. The series concluded on September 10, 2006.
- Related aired from October 5, 2005, to March 20, 2006, during the 2005–2006 television season. Despite heavy promotion, initial ratings did not warrant the show being picked up for a second season when The WB network was folded into The CW.
- Twins first aired on The WB in the United States and on CTV in Canada on September 16, 2005, and ended on March 3, 2006. The show was cancelled on May 18, 2006, due to the merger of the WB and UPN that created the new network The CW.

=== 2006 ===
This would be the final season of broadcasting for both UPN and The WB. They would merge to form The CW next season. The book Season Finale suggests many reasons for the demise of The WB, including founder Jamie Kellner's departure, the lack of owned and operated stations, a failure to develop many new hits after 2002, Time Warner's decision to merge with America Online and allowing Buffy the Vampire Slayer to move from The WB to UPN for its last two seasons.

The WB closed on Sunday, September 17 with The Night of Favorites and Farewells, a five-hour block of pilot episodes of The WB's past signature series, including Felicity, Angel, Buffy the Vampire Slayer (which was a two-hour episode) and Dawson's Creek. Commercial breaks shown on The WB that evening featured re-airings of past image campaigns and network promotions, promo spots given to cable networks that carried these shows in off-network syndication, as well as ads for each series' TV-on-DVD box set.

After its final commercial break, a montage featuring stars of several of The WB's shows over the years was broadcast just prior to The WB's shutdown, ending with a silhouette of former mascot Michigan J. Frog taking a final bow. This was followed by the studio credits for the pilot of Dawson's Creek; the credits for the other three pilots that aired were shown in The WB's standardized credits format. The final night of WB programming netted relatively low ratings, mustering only a share of 2, meaning just 2% of viewers were tuned into The WB on its final night. The reasoning for the low ratings was due to the fact that WB affiliates in certain areas had already affiliated with MyNetworkTV at that network's launch, which rendered The WB's programming unavailable in these markets during its final two weeks of broadcasting. It also aired against the second ever game (a Cowboys–Redskins rivalry game at Texas Stadium) of NBC Sunday Night Football, assuring fewer viewers due to the curiosity of the NFL's prime game now being on Sunday evenings.

That evening, after The WB shut down, some Tribune-owned affiliates that would join The CW when it launched the following night acknowledged the pending switchover within their newscasts, with most adopting their new CW station brands immediately. WPIX in New York City aired a montage of all of the logos used throughout the station's history leading up to the introduction of its new "CW11" logo before the start of its 10:00 p.m. newscast, while KHCW (channel 39) in Houston aired a retrospective of the station's history during its 9:00 p.m. news. In Dallas-Fort Worth, KDAF (channel 33) had retitled its primetime newscast to CW33 News at Nine immediately following the end of WB programming, and featured a video clip of the signage being changed outside the station's studios (however, the old WB33 News at Nine bumper aired upon returning from the first commercial break that night).

Notable shows

- Pepper Dennis aired from April 4 to July 4, 2006. It was quickly announced on May 17, 2006, that Pepper Dennis would not be one of the WB shows transferred to The CW. Pepper Dennis was the final show to premiere on The WB before its transition to The CW network. The song used in commercials for the show was "Black Horse and the Cherry Tree" by KT Tunstall, and the opening theme song is "Better Half" by Chris Trapper, the former frontman for the Boston pop group The Push Stars. Another song that the WB used for advertising "Pepper Dennis" was Morningwood's "Nth Degree" which also appeared in another WB drama, One Tree Hill.
- The Bedford Diaries premiered on March 29, 2006, on The WB and concluded its first season on May 10, 2006. A week prior to its premiere, The WB attempted to build buzz with scenes from the series' pilot posted on their website with more adult material not meant for broadcast, with those scenes edited out for the actual broadcast episode.
- Modern Men premiered on March 17, 2006. The show was canceled due to a lack of time slots from the merger of The WB and UPN that created the new network The CW and due to poor ratings.
- Survival of the Richest first aired on March 31, 2006, in which seven "rich kids" who had a combined net worth of over $3 billion were forced to work together with 7 "poor kids" who had a combined debt of $150,000, through a series of challenges to win the grand prize of USD $200,000. It was hosted by Hal Sparks.
- The Night of Favorites and Farewells was a one-time special lineup that aired on September 17, 2006. It consisted of pilot episodes for some of the network's most popular and longest running shows. The five-hour block was aired on all affiliates of The WB with the exception of those which had taken affiliation with MyNetworkTV, unless they kept the WB as a secondary affiliation. It served as The WB's last nationally broadcast schedule, as the network officially closed down after the program Dawson's Creek ended to make way for The CW. The night began with the announcer, Hal Douglas (who had become the "voice" of the WB for the majority of its history, and would not continue as announcer for the CW, but instead moved to ABC), introducing the viewers to the night's schedule, and began with the premiere episode of Felicity. The final image on The WB was of their former mascot Michigan J. Frog (who was shown as a white silhouette due to the animated character being retired as the network's mascot the year before), taking his hat off and bowing while the words "thank you" are on the screen, thanking the audience for watching the network for the last 11 years. As the image faded out, The WB officially left the airwaves. The clip montage officially ended the network's operations, as the studio credits for Dawson's Creek were shown afterwards instead of The WB's standard credits scheme, which had been used on the other pilots that aired during the night. That evening, after The WB shut down, some affiliates that would join The CW when it launched the following night acknowledged the pending switchover within their newscasts, with most adopting their new CW station brands immediately. New York City affiliate WPIX (channel 11) aired a montage of all of the logos used throughout the station's history leading up to the introduction of its new "CW11" logo before the start of its 10:00 p.m. newscast, while KHCW (channel 39) in Houston aired a retrospective of the station's history during its 9:00 p.m. news. In Dallas-Fort Worth, KDAF (channel 33) had retitled its primetime newscast to CW33 News at Nine immediately following the end of WB programming, and featured a video clip of the signage being changed outside the station's studios (however, the old WB33 News at Nine bumper aired upon returning from the first commercial break that night). Over the next few days, there were many discussions about the night on The CW's forums, most of which expressed sadness. Additionally, many recalled memories of watching the WB. However, The Night of Favorites and Farewells was a disappointment in ratings; The WB that night scored a 0.9 household rating and a share of just 2. The main reason for this mostly lies in certain areas where former WB affiliates became MyNetworkTV affiliates, thus leaving The WB's final two weeks of programming unavailable in such markets as Philadelphia, Seattle and Atlanta, whose WB affiliates switched to MyNetworkTV.

== See also ==
- List of programs broadcast by The WB
- List of former WB affiliates
- Kids' WB
  - List of programs broadcast by Kids' WB
- History of UPN
