= Larry Pine =

American actor (born 1945)

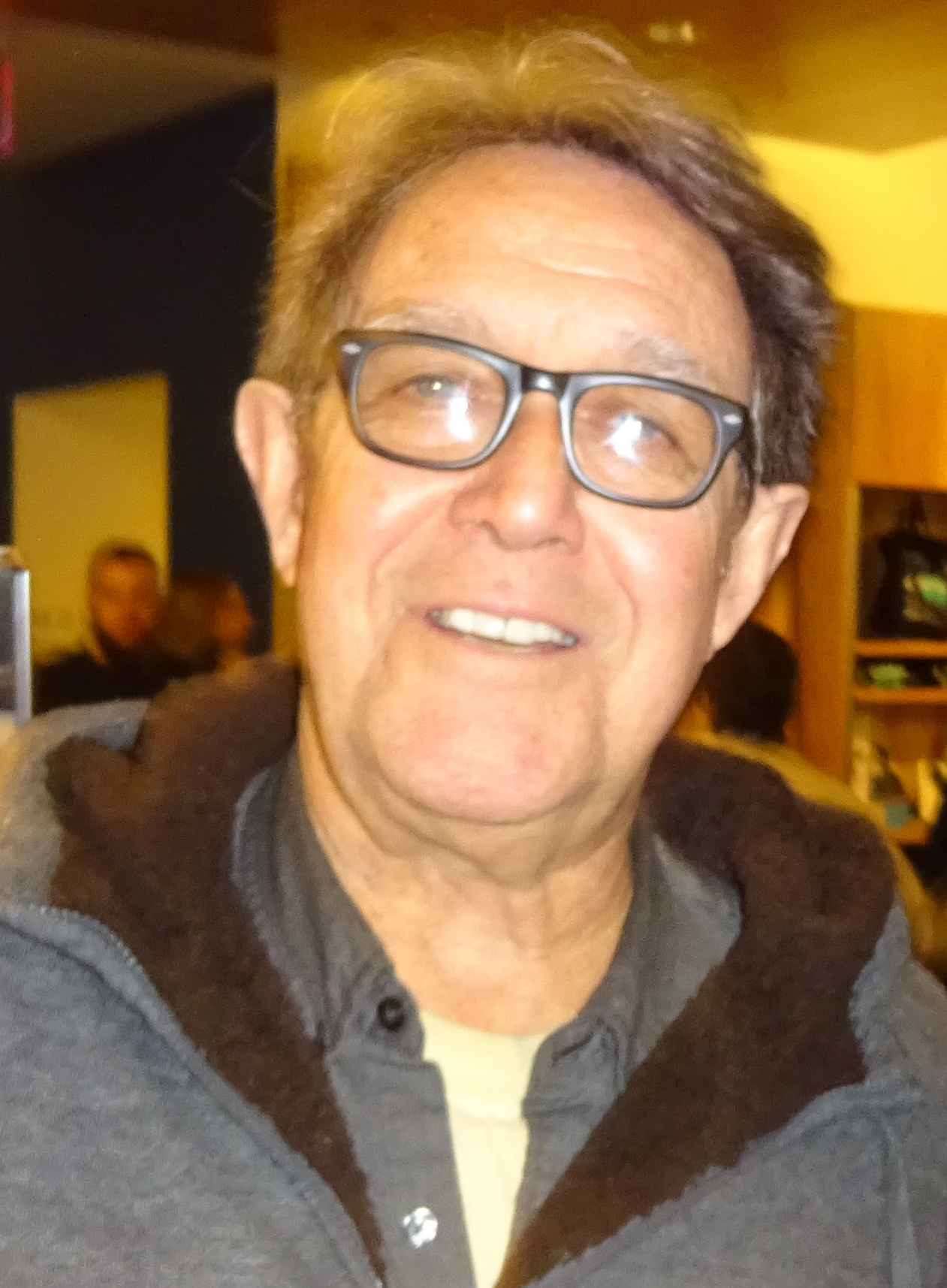
- Pine in 2016
- Born: March 3, 1945 (age 81); Tucson, Arizona, U.S.
- Education: University of North Texas (BA); New York University (MFA)
- Occupation: Actor
- Years active: 1968–present
- Spouse: Margaret Rachlin (m. 1969)
- Children: 1

Larry Pine (born March 3, 1945) is an American actor.

A veteran of the Broadway stage, he began his career playing the role of Fop in the 1968 production of Cyrano de Bergerac. He has since starred in film and television, with recurring roles in television shows such as As the World Turns, One Life to Live, All My Children, Hostages, House of Cards, and Succession. He has also appeared in films such as Vanya on 42nd Street (1994) for which he was nominated for the Independent Spirit Award for Best Supporting Male, Tim Robbins's Dead Man Walking (1995), Before and After (1996), Maid in Manhattan (2002), Woody Allen's Melinda and Melinda (2004), and Wes Anderson's The Royal Tenenbaums (2001), Moonrise Kingdom (2012), The Grand Budapest Hotel (2014), and The French Dispatch (2021).

== Career ==
Pine began his professional acting career Off-Broadway, then in 1968 appeared as Fop in Cyrano de Bergerac at the Vivian Beaumont Theater. A founding member of the avant-garde theater company the Manhattan Project, he appeared in its 1968 production of Alice in Wonderland, directed by Andre Gregory.

Pine performed in Louis Malle's Vanya on 42nd Street and Woody Allen's Celebrity, Small Time Crooks, and Melinda and Melinda, among other films. He appears in the book Are You Dave Gorman? as the first actor the writer encounters to have played a fictional Dave Gorman (in The Ice Storm). In both The Royal Tenenbaums and The Door in the Floor, he appears as a Charlie Rose-type interviewer, conducting a one-on-one interview in a dark studio. From 1997 to 1999, Pine portrayed Barry Shire on All My Children.

== Personal life ==
Pine was born in Tucson, Arizona. He received a Bachelor of Arts degree from the University of North Texas, and went on to graduate from New York University's Tisch School of the Arts in 1968 with a Master of Fine Arts degree. Since 1969, he has been married to composer and sound designer Margaret Pine (née Rachlin). The couple have one son, Jacob (born 1972).

== Filmography ==
=== Film ===
Year	Title	Role	Director	Notes
1982	I, the Jury	Movie Director	Richard T. Heffron	
1982	Hanky Panky	Interrogator	Sidney Poitier	
1982	Q	The Professor	Larry Cohen	
1982	MysteryDisc: Murder, Anyone?	Tom Reardon	Philip S. Goodman	Video
1982	Alone in the Dark	Dr. Harry Merton	Jack Sholder	
1988	Plain Clothes	Dave Hechtor	Martha Coolidge	
1989	The Dream Team	Canning	Howard Zieff	
1994	Vanya on 42nd Street	Dr. Mikhail Astrov	Louis Malle	
1995	Dead Man Walking	Guy Gilardi	Tim Robbins	
1996	Como Nascem os Anjos (How Angels Are Born)	William	Murilo Salles	
1996	Before and After	Dr. Tom McAnally	Barbet Schroeder	
1997	Sunday	Ben Vesey	Jonathan Nossiter	
1997	The Ice Storm	Dave Gorman	Ang Lee	
1997	Addicted to Love	Street Comic	Griffin Dunne	
1997	Academy Boyz	Ramsey Glover	Dennis Cooper	
1998	Jaded	Judge Hayfield	Caryn Krooth	
1998	Celebrity	Philip Datloff	Woody Allen	
1999	Suits	Peter Haverford	Eric Weber	
1999	Let It Snow	Wendell Milson	Adam Marcus	
1999	A Stranger in the Kingdom	Edward Kinneson	Jay Craven	
2000	Small Time Crooks	Charles Bailey	Woody Allen	
2001	The Royal Tenenbaums	Peter Bradley	Wes Anderson	
2001	The Shipping News	Bayonet Melville	Lasse Hallström	
2002	Maid in Manhattan	Mr. Lefferts	Wayne Wang	
2003	Particles of Truth	Mr. Wiley	Jennifer Elster	
2004	The Clearing	Tom Finch	Pieter Jan Brugge	
2004	Melinda and Melinda	Max	Woody Allen	
2004	The Door in the Floor	Interviewer	Tod Williams	
2006	Islander	Old Man Cole	Ian McCrudden	
2008	Killing Kasztner	Rudolf Kasztner	Gaylen Ross	
2009	Chasing the Green	Frank Daniels	Russ Emanuel	
2009	2B	Bilko Johnson	Richard Kroehling	
2009	The Good Heart	Laugh Therapist	Dagur Kári	
2012	Broadway's Finest	A. K. Lipson	Stephen Marro	
2012	Arbitrage	Jeffrey Greenberg	Nicholas Jarecki	
2012	See Girl Run	Bob Barrister	Nate Meyer	
2012	Moonrise Kingdom	Mr. Howard Billingsley	Wes Anderson	
2013	Jimmy P: Psychotherapy of a Plains Indian	Karl Menninger	Arnaud Desplechin	
2013	A Master Builder	Dr. Ejlert Herdal	Jonathan Demme	
2014	The Grand Budapest Hotel	Mr. Mosher	Wes Anderson	
2014	The Longest Week	Narrator (voice)	Peter Glanz	
2017	Freak Show	William	Trudie Styler	
2018	Beirut	Frank Whalen	Brad Anderson	
2018	An Actor Prepares	Jack Dorner	Steve Clark	
2020	Still Here	Jeffrey Hoffman	Vlad Feier	
2021	12 Mighty Orphans	President Roosevelt	Ty Roberts	
2021	The French Dispatch	Chief Magistrate	Wes Anderson	
2023	The Kill Room	Dr. Galvinson	Nicol Paone	
2024	Adam the First	Jacob #3		

Key
†	Denotes films that have not yet been released

=== Television ===
Year	Title	Role	Notes
1978	Hullabaloo Over Georgie and Bonnie's Pictures	Clark Haven	Television film
1986	As the World Turns	Tad Channing	Recurring role
1986	Tales from the Darkside	Uncle Richard	Episode: "The Geezenstacks"
1987	ABC Afterschool Special	Elmo Grady	Episode: "Read Between the Lines"
1988	Miami Vice	Tom Pierce	Episode: "Vote of Confidence"
1988–1992	One Life to Live	Roger Gordon	Unknown episodes
1989	The Justice Game	Wendell Fergusson	3 episodes
1991	The Days and Nights of Molly Dodd	Bennett Casey	Episode: "Here's How to Break the Other Leg"
1994	Law & Order	Edward St. John	Episode: "Scoundrels"
1994	The Adventures of Pete & Pete	Dr. Burt Looper	Episode: "The Call"
1997–1999	All My Children	Barry Shire #1	6 episodes
1998	A Will of Their Own	Charles Steward	Miniseries; 2 episodes
1998	New York Undercover	Leonard	Episode: "Spare Parts"
1999	Law & Order	Dr. Jacob Weiss	Episode: "Harm"
1999–2003	Oz	Arnie Zelman	8 episodes
2001	The Dave Gorman Collection	Himself/Dave Gorman	Episode #1.3
2001	The $treet	Sam Gibson	Episode: "Past Performance"
2001	100 Centre Street	Warren Bennington	Episode: "Daughters"
2004	Law & Order: Criminal Intent	Bingham Post	Episode: "Consumed"
2004–2005	Gilmore Girls	Simon McLane	2 episodes
2005	Empire Falls	Otto Mayer	Miniseries; 2 episodes
2006	Law & Order: Special Victims Unit	Attorney Van Allen	Episode: "Clock"
2008	Canterbury's Law	Wallace Warren	Episode: "What Goes Around"
2011	Person of Interest	Wernick	Episode: "Foe"
2011–2012	Homeland	Richard Halsted	2 episodes
2012	Blue Bloods	NYPD Chief Surgeon	Episode: "Mother's Day"
2013	The Good Wife	Paul Lampard	Episode: "The Seven Day Rule"
2013–2014	Hostages	Burton Delaney	10 episodes
2013–2017	House of Cards	Bob Birch	23 episodes
2014	Unforgettable	Stanton Ward	Episode: "Til Death"
2015	Madam Secretary	Sean Williams	Episode: "Catch and Release"
2015	Chicago Med	Tom Donovan	Episode: "iNO"
2017–2018	Gotham	Mayor Burke	3 episodes
2018–2023	Succession	Sandy Furness	11 episodes
2024	Manhunt †	William H. Seward	Completed

== Stage ==
Year	Title	Role	Notes
1968	Cyrano de Bergerac	Fop	Vivian Beaumont Theater, Broadway
1976	Jinxs Bridge	Elmo Drake	The Public Theater, Off-Broadway
1977–78	The Mandrake	Brother Timothy	The Public Theater, Off-Broadway
1983	Private Lives	Victor Prynne	Lunt-Fontanne Theatre, Broadway
1984	End of the World	Ensemble	Music Box Theatre, Broadway
1985	A Day in the Death of Joe Egg	Bri / Freddie	Longacre Theatre, Broadway
1993–94	Angels in America	Roy Cohn	Walter Kerr Theatre, Broadway
1996	Bus Stop	Virgil Blessing	Circle in the Square Theatre, Broadway
2001	The Seagull	Dorin	The Public Theater, Off-Broadway
2003	The Women of Lockerbie	Bill Livingston	The New Group, Off-Broadway
2006	Stuff Happens	Donald Rumsfeld	The Public Theater, Off-Broadway
2007	Secret Order	Robert Brock	Merrimack Repertory Theatre, Off-Broadway
2009	The Royal Family	Gilbert Marshall	Samuel J. Friedman Theatre, Broadway
2009	The Shanghai Gesture	Sir Guy Charteris	Julia Miles Theater, Off-Broadway
2014	Casa Valentina	The Judge / Amy	Samuel J. Friedman Theatre, Broadway
2014	Billy & Ray	Raymond Chandler	Vineyard Theatre, Off-Broadway
2014	A Public Reading of an Unproduced; Screenplay About the Death of Walt Disney	Walt Disney	Soho Repertory Theater, Off-Broadway,
2016	Buried Child	Father Dewis	The New Group, Off-Broadway
2017	Evening at the Talk House	Tom	The New Group, Off-Broadway

== Awards and nominations ==
Year	Award	Category	Title	Result
1995	Independent Spirit Award	Best Supporting Male	Vanya on 42nd Street	Nominated
2001	Joe A. Callaway Award	—N/a	The Seagull	Won
2014	Obie Award	Performance	A Public Reading of an Unproduced; Screenplay About the Death of Walt Disney	Won
