= After Sex =

After Sex may refer to:

- After Sex (1997 film), a French drama film that stars Brigitte Roüan and Patrick Chesnais
- After Sex (2000 film), a comedy film that stars Dan Cortese, Virginia Madsen, and Brooke Shields
- After Sex (2007 film), a film that uses sex as a background to examine intimacy
