= The Flesh Eaters (film) =

1964 film by Jack Curtis

- Theatrical release poster
- Directed by: Jack Curtis
- Written by: Arnold Drake
- Produced by: Jack Curtis; Terry Curtis; Arnold Drake
- Starring: Martin Kosleck; Rita Morely; Byron Sanders
- Cinematography: Carson Davidson
- Edited by: Radley Metzger
- Music by: Julian Stein
- Production company: Vulcan Productions
- Distributed by: Cinema Distributors of America
- Release date: March 18, 1964
- Running time: 91 minutes/later cut to 87 minutes
- Country: United States
- Language: English

The Flesh Eaters is a 1964 American horror/science fiction thriller, directed on a low budget by Jack Curtis and edited by future filmmaker Radley Metzger. The film contains moments of violence much more graphic and extreme than many other movies of its time, making it one of the first ever gore films.

== Plot ==
Jan Letterman, the personal assistant to wealthy, over-the-hill actress Laura Winters, hires pilot Grant Murdoch to fly her from New York to Provincetown, Massachusetts, but a storm forces them to land on a small island. They meet Prof. Peter Bartell, a marine biologist with a German accent who is living in seclusion on the isle.

A series of strange skeletons wash ashore (human, then fish), since the water is inhabited by some sort of glowing microbe which devours flesh rapaciously. Bartell is a former US Government agent who was sent to Nazi Germany to recover as much of their scientific data as possible. He was chosen for the job for his scientific skills and knowledge of the German language. Using the methods learned there he hopes to cultivate a group of monstrous "flesh eaters" that can devour the skin off a victim in mere seconds. A beatnik named Omar joins the group after becoming shipwrecked on their shore. Tensions mount after the plane drifts off into the ocean, leaving the castaways and Bartell as potential meals for the ravenous monsters.

High-voltage electrification (from a battery system devised by Bartell) is utilized in an attempt to slay the monsters. Bartell explains that he has been tracking these creatures and attempting to cultivate them to sell as biological weapons. An electrical shock does not kill the creatures, but instead causes the numerous smaller microbes to merge into a larger organism. By accident, the survivors stumble upon the solution to killing them: the creatures devour flesh but not blood, as in each case where remains have been found blood has been present. Bartell surmises that the creatures have a negative reaction to hemoglobin and, when directly injected with it, are slain. By applying a large electrical shock to the waters surrounding the island, the survivors force the numerous dispersed microbes into forming a giant single organism. Following a struggle, Bartell is killed just before Murdoch destroys the last of the creatures. Murdoch and Letterman leave the island together.

== Cast ==
- Byron Sanders as Grant Murdoch
- Barbara Wilkin as Jan Letterman
- Martin Kosleck as Prof. Peter Bartell
- Rita Morley as Laura Winters
- Ray Tudor as Omar
- Christopher Drake as Matt
- Darby Nelson as Jim
- Rita Floyd as Radio Operator
- Warren Houston as Cab Driver
- Barbara Wilson as Ann
- Ira Lewis as Freddy

== Production ==
The film has developed a cult following due to its gruesome, if primitive, special effects, including some memorably bloody death scenes. One character is eaten from the inside out by the titular monsters, resulting in a gushing fountain of intestinal matter.

The deep focus cinematography was the work of director Jack Curtis (working under a pseudonym, Carson Davidson), who shot most scene outdoors under the sun of Long Island. The film was scripted by comic book writer Arnold Drake (The Doom Patrol, Marvel's Captain Marvel, et al.). Drake storyboarded the film, so every shot has the careful, formalized composition of a well-drawn comic strip. One shot, for example is a shot in deep focus: the right profile of the hero dominates the left-side foreground of the frame; in a moment, two or three tiny figures at the far-removed shoreline move left to right, from behind the actor's head, and in focus.

According to the film's writer and producer Arnold Drake, Terry Curtis, wife of director Jack Curtis won $72,000 on the television quiz show: "High Low". Part of the money was used finishing the production. While filming on location at Montauk, New York, a real hurricane destroyed the sets and equipment. Production was delayed for a year and the cost rose from $60,000 to $105,000.

In 1967, George A. Romero began work on a horror film provisionally called Night of the Flesh Eaters; to avoid confusion with this film, the title was changed to Night of the Living Dead. The title was changed when its distributor, The Walter Reade Organization, expressed concern over confusion with The Flesh Eaters, released three years earlier. The film was copyrighted two years before its original release in 1964.

Although Barbara Wilkin had the prominent role of Ann, she said in an interview that she has no memory of this film.

== Release ==
=== Theatrical release ===
The Flesh Eaters was first released in Phoenix, Arizona on March 18, 1964. It later had a re-release in 1968 which removed a flashback sequence showing the original Nazi human experiments with "the flesh eaters".

=== Home media ===
The film was released on DVD by MPI Home Video on Oct 25, 2005.

== Reception ==
Author and film critic Leonard Maltin awarded the film one and a half out of four stars calling the film, "occasionally tense, but gruesome and boring". Dennis Schwartz on his website Ozus' World Movie Reviews awarded the film a grade C−, calling it, "A lovable but bad mad scientist B-film."

TV Guide gave the film two out of four stars, stating that the film's dedication and imagination made up for its lack of budget. Allmovie gave the film a positive review, writing, "This fun, endearingly trashy B-movie gem is one of the best-kept secrets in cult movie fandom. Simply put, The Flesh Eaters offers everything one could want from a drive-in flick of this era: there are colorful characters, action, suspense, fun plot hooks, and a really cool monster".
