= Adam Storke =

American actor

- Born: Adam J. Storke; August 18, 1962 (age 63); New York City, U.S.
- Occupation: Actor

Adam J. Storke (born August 18, 1962) is an American actor who has starred in television and film. He is best known for playing Julia Roberts's love interest in the 1988 film Mystic Pizza and as Larry Underwood in the 1994 Stephen King mini series The Stand.

== Biography ==
Storke was born in New York City, the son of Angela Thornton, an actress, and William Storke, a film and television producer. His well-known television role is in the soap opera Search for Tomorrow as Andrew Ryder in 1985 and in the short lived TV series in 1998 Prey. Adam has appeared in some TV movies and has made guest appearances on several television series, including Miami Vice, L.A. Law, American Dreams, Law & Order: Criminal Intent, Tales from the Crypt and 2005's Over There. His theatre credits include The Rimers of Eldritch.

== Filmography ==
- Broadway's Finest (2012) (film)
- New Amsterdam (2008) (TV)
- Over There (2005) (TV)
- Our Generation (2003) (TV)
- Crossing Jordan (2003) (TV)
- Johnson County War (2002) (mini)
- Roughing It (2002) (TV)
- Prey (1998) (TV)
- Rough Riders (1997)
- Escape from Terror: The Teresa Stamper Story (1995) (as Paul Stamper)
- Tales From The Crypt (1994)
- Attack of the 5 Ft. 2 In. Women (1994)
- The Stand (1994) (mini)
- Death Becomes Her (1992)
- Highway to Hell (1992)
- The Phantom of the Opera (1990)
- Mystic Pizza (1988)
- A Gathering of Old Men (1987)
- I'll Take Manhattan (1987)
