= Escape from Terror: The Teresa Stamper Story =

- Genre: Drama
- Based on: Unsolved Mysteries
- Written by: Camilla Carr; Walter Klenhard
- Directed by: Michael Scott
- Starring: Adam Storke; Maria Pitillo; Brad Dourif; Cindy Williams
- Country of origin: United States
- Original language: English

Production
- Executive producers: John Cosgrove; Terry Dunn Meurer
- Producer: John Perrin Flynn
- Cinematography: Stephen M. Katz
- Editor: M. Scott Smith
- Running time: 90 minutes
- Production company: Cosgrove/Meurer Productions

Original release
- Network: NBC
- Release: January 23, 1995

Escape From Terror: The Teresa Stamper Story is a 1995 American crime drama television film based on a true story from Unsolved Mysteries. It stars Adam Storke, Maria Pitillo, Brad Dourif and Cindy Williams.

== Plot ==
The movie begins with Teresa Stamper giving an interview about her ex-husband, Paul Stamper. She recalls that he caught her when she wasn't looking and how she thought that he was a charmer.

The story flashes back to November 1982, when 23-year-old Teresa Walden lives with her mother, Wanda, in Hennessey, Oklahoma. Teresa takes a job as a secretary at Stamper Oil Company and begins a relationship with its owner, Paul Stamper. The couple marry in Las Vegas in February 1983.

After their marriage, Paul becomes physically abusive toward Teresa. She returns to live with Wanda, who had also experienced abuse from Teresa’s father. Paul later apologizes to Teresa, and the couple reconcile.

Two years later, Teresa and Paul have a daughter, Katie. Teresa eventually discovers that Paul has been stealing oil pumps and using drugs as his abusive behavior escalates. After Paul assaults her, Teresa is taken to a hospital, where Sheriff Bill Douglass advises her to obtain a restraining order against him.

Teresa files for divorce and records Paul threatening to kill her. When Paul denies making the threat in court, the recording is presented as evidence, and the judge grants Teresa a restraining order requiring Paul to stay away from her.

After the divorce, Teresa begins a relationship with Chris. Paul later impersonates a police officer, shoots Chris and kidnaps Teresa. After being held hostage overnight, Teresa escapes and contacts the police, who arrest Paul. She returns home and learns that Chris survived the shooting.

Paul escapes from jail with the help of another inmate. Sheriff Douglass moves Teresa, Wanda, and Katie to a different location for their protection, but Paul tracks them down and continues stalking Teresa. As authorities search for Paul, Teresa and Chris end their relationship.

Five years later, Teresa and Katie are living in Nashville when Paul contacts Teresa again. Sheriff Douglass arranges for Paul’s case to be featured on Unsolved Mysteries, generating leads that indicate he has been living in Colorado under the name Gary Wickle. Authorities also learn that he has kidnapped and threatened another woman.

Police confirm that Gary Wickle is Paul, who has been living with a new wife in Colorado. He is arrested, and Sheriff Douglass informs Teresa of his capture.

Returning to the present, Teresa reveals that Paul was sentenced to 35 years in prison. Reflecting on her experience, she concludes that his abusive behavior was not love.

== Cast ==
- Adam Storke as Paul Stamper - Teresa's abusive husband, the father of Katie, and the main antagonist who stalks his wife throughout the movie. He owns an oil company. While on the run, he works for a trucking company under the alias "Gary Wickle" and remarries to a woman named Sue, who has two children from a previous marriage and becomes pregnant with their child.
- Maria Pitillo as Teresa Walden Stamper - Paul's wife and the mother of Katie. She is the film's main protagonist who must protect her family from her abusive husband.
- Brad Dourif as Bill Douglass - The sheriff who protects Teresa and tries to catch Paul.
- Cindy Williams as Wanda Walden - Teresa's mother and the maternal grandmother of Katie who works as a diner waitress. She suffered from an abusive marriage to Teresa's father.
- Tony Becker as Chris Butler - A friend of Teresa's who she later starts to date, and gets shot by Paul but survives.
- Luce Rains as Charlie - One of Paul's employees at the oil company who senses that he is trouble.
- Stanley M. Fisher as the judge - A judge who grants Teresa a restraining order from Paul after she divorces him.
- Pat Mahoney as Luke Burnham - A kind elderly man whose house Paul buys for himself and Teresa after Luke moves.
- Caitlyn Flinn as Jennifer - A little girl who Paul meets on the bus while trying to escape from the police. Her parents are divorced and she is on the bus to go visit her grandmother on her farm.
