= The Phantom of the Opera (miniseries) =

1990 television film directed by Tony Richardson

- Official DVD cover
- Genre: Drama; Music; Mystery; Horror
- Created by: Saban Entertainment
- Based on: The Phantom of the Opera by Gaston Leroux
- Written by: Arthur Kopit
- Directed by: Tony Richardson
- Starring: Charles Dance; Teri Polo; Burt Lancaster
- Theme music composer: John Addison
- Countries of origin: United States; France; Italy; Germany
- Original language: English
- No. of episodes: 2

Production
- Executive producers: Gary Hoffman; Ross Milloy; Haim Saban; Edgar J. Scherick
- Producer: Ross Milloy
- Production location: Paris
- Cinematography: Steve Yaconelli
- Editor: Bob Lambert
- Running time: 168 minutes
- Production company: Saban Entertainment
- Budget: $10 million

Original release
- Network: NBC
- Release: March 18 – March 19, 1990

The Phantom of the Opera is a 1990 American two-part television miniseries directed by Tony Richardson and starring Charles Dance in the title role. It is adapted from Arthur Kopit's book from his stage musical Phantom, which is based loosely on Gaston Leroux's 1910 novel.

== Plot ==
Episode One

The Phantom of the Opera is a disfigured musician named Erik who lives below the Opéra Garnier in Paris. He has a large part in managing each performance until his friend Gerard Carriere is dismissed. The new manager Choleti refuses to listen to warnings about the "ghost" who haunts the opera house, even when the wardrobe man goes into the depths of the opera house and is killed.

Christine Daaé, a poor girl from the countryside, comes to the Paris Opera House to receive voice lessons; however she is dismissed by Choleti's wife, Carlotta, to working in the costume department. The doorman lets Christine stay in a storage room in the Opera House. Upon hearing her sing, the Phantom is entranced by her voice. He offers to be her teacher, but tells her he must remain anonymous, for fear that others will pursue him for lessons; that is the reason he gives for why he wears a mask. They begin lessons, and the Phantom falls deeper in love with her.

Erik begins a campaign of humiliation against Carlotta, sabotaging her performances, as Christine grows in skill. The handsome and somewhat womanising Comte Phillipe de Chagny returns to Paris and offers Christine an invitation to a party he will hold for the Opera company, at the Bistro, an establishment where people often perform. With Erik's encouragement that she is ready for an audience, Christine does attend. Erik leaves the Opera and listens to her performance in secret. Meanwhile, Christine is whisked away by the Comte, who realizes Christine was his childhood sweetheart. Erik witnesses them leaving together and, fleeing back to the Opera, stays up all night in the rehearsal room. Christine, feeling that she has betrayed Erik, is worried when she can not find him, believing he has abandoned her.

Finding out Christine has been living in the Opera, Carlotta blackmails Christine into telling her about her vocal coach. When Carlotta informs her husband that Christine's teacher is the Phantom, Choleti gives Christine the female lead of the opera Faust; he is working with the police to capture the Phantom. Out of jealousy, Carlotta gives Christine a drink that weakens her voice during the performance. The audience boos and Erik is enraged. He cuts through the ropes holding the chandelier and drops it on the audience.

Episode Two

Immediately following the chandelier crash, The Phantom takes a distraught and humiliated Christine to his underground lair. To allow her time to recover from her harrowing experience, he shows his own musical prowess by singing her to sleep. Erik then discovers Carlotta was behind Christine's voice problems and dumps rats on her, driving her insane. Carriere pleads with him to let Christine go, but Erik refuses. He insists that the world above is not fit for her and believes that in time she will love him, ordering Carriere to leave whilst he prepares defences, including gunpowder and crossbows, against anyone looking for Christine or him. Carriere goes to Christine, who also sees no reason to return to the outside world when Erik is so kind, and urges her to get out.

He tells her the story of Erik's mother, a great singer named Belladova to whom she bears a resemblance. She and Carriere worked together at the Opera, as a ballet dancer and a stage hand respectively, when they became lovers. One day, Belladova told Carriere she was pregnant and he confessed he was already married (having been forced to marry a girl who claimed her child was his). As they had no love for each other, his wife gave him permission to leave, which led to him coming to Paris. Belladova, distraught at the idea of carrying an illegitimate child, ran away, and Carriere did not see her for many months, until he spotted her buying a tonic that would end her pregnancy. Carriere prevented this, but Belladova went into labour, and Carriere brought her below the opera house, where the animals for productions were kept. Despite the baby's clear facial deformities, Belladova saw him only as beautiful. She died when Erik was three, from a fever Carriere supposed came from living in such a dirty place. He, having since been hired as manager, allowed Erik to live there his entire life, in order to fulfill a dying promise to Belladova to watch over their son. Carriere also confesses that Erik is in love with Christine. Despite Carriere's pleading to escape before she breaks Erik's heart and he destroys everyone in the Opera House, Christine refuses to leave without talking to Erik.

She asks Erik to show her his face, promising him that she would be able to look at him with love and acceptance, as his mother once did. When he does reluctantly unmask, she faints. In the midst of an anguished breakdown, Erik locks her in one of his chambers. Christine escapes, and Carriere and the Comte take her from the Opera House. Christine is stricken with guilt and begs Phillipe to take her back, having seen a vision of Erik dying. The Comte agrees and he and Christine approach Choleti about singing that night. Choleti secretly arranges to have police planted throughout the opera house.

Carriere tells a frail and heartbroken Erik that Christine did not mean to hurt him. When Erik jokes that Carriere should see his face, the older man reveals that he has, finally confessing he is his father. Erik says he knew all along, as they have the same eyes (the only part of his face he can bear to look at). He tells Carriere he wishes to die privately, and to return in a day to bury him. He could not bear the idea of being paraded around because of his deformity, which Carriere agrees to, parting with kiss on Erik's forehead. Christine sings at that night's performance of Faust, in the hope Erik will hear and know she still loves him (though she emphasises to Phillipe she loves the two men in different ways). Erik hears her and summons enough strength to force himself up to Box Five. He begins singing with her. Christine and the Phantom sing to each other with such passion that the audience is awed and gives them a standing ovation.

The police shoot at Erik and he grabs ahold of Christine. The pair run to the roof. The Comte pursues them, but in the ensuing struggle is knocked off the roof, dangling above the street. At Christine's pleading, Erik pulls him to safety. Erik is cornered by police who, he is horrified to hear, are determined to take him alive. Carriere, at Erik's behest, shoots him. Erik falls from the roof and Christine runs to him. While cradled in his father's lap, Christine removes Erik's mask, looks him straight in the face and smiles, placing a kiss on his forehead. Erik dies, happy, with his father and Christine at his side. Christine replaces Erik's mask and is led away by the Comte.

== Cast ==
- Charles Dance as Erik/The Phantom of The Opera, the deformed but incredibly talented singer who resides in the catacombs of the Opera House. He falls in love with Christine and struggles with his hatred for both himself and the world above, which he does not understand due to years of fear and isolation. Gérard Garino provides the Phantom's singing voice
- Teri Polo as Christine Daaé, the pupil and love interest of the Phantom (and the Comte) who has the voice of an angel. Polo also plays Belladova, the Phantom's mother, who Christine resembles both physically and in musical talent. Michelle Lagrange provides Christine's singing voice
- Adam Storke as Comte Philippe de Chagny, a patron of the Opera who used his position to secure singing lessons for Christine after hearing her sing at a country fair. He later recognises her as his childhood sweetheart and abandons his previously womanising ways due to his love for her
- Burt Lancaster as Gérard Carrière, the former manager of the Opera for 30 years, who mysteriously holds deeper knowledge and understanding of the Phantom than anyone else
- Ian Richardson as Alain Choleti, the pompous new manager of the Opera, who at first refuses to entertain the idea of the Phantom, but soon becomes determined to have him arrested or killed
- Andréa Ferréol as Carlotta Choleti, the beloved wife of Choleti, and a self-centred diva who refuses to be upstaged by those with greater talent, often at their and her husband's expense. Helia T'Hezan provides Carlotta's singing voice
- Jean-Pierre Cassel as Inspector Ledoux, who Choleti collaborates with to catch the Phantom, despite being doubtful such a Phantom even exists
- Jean Rougerie as Jean Claude, the kindly doorman of the Opera and friend of Carriere, who, after discovering Christine has no means for lodging after being rebuked from the Opera, allows her to live in secret in the lower levels of the building, rent-free
- André Chaumeau as Joseph Buquet, Carlotta's long-suffering costumer, who is sent into the catacombs to take inventory. He became the very first and somewhat unintentional victim of the Phantom, after being spooked from a high place

== Production ==
Arthur Kopit had long been an admirer of Gaston Leroux's story, but felt that the horror premise had left out the possibility of a more compelling relationship between the two main characters. So he came up with a script in which the Phantom is a romantic hero, frightening only to those who would misuse the opera house wherein he dwells – and to those who would stand in the way of Christine's eventual rise to stardom. And he decided to use plenty of music in his storytelling – not original music, but classical opera arias that would imbue his production with a sense of the Phantom's heart, soul and passion. Then Andrew Lloyd Webber came along, and Kopit was devastated: "Here was work that I deeply loved, and it looked for all that world like it would never be seen."

He later heard that the network was in the market for a miniseries, so he sent them a copy of his script. "I had to convince them that I wasn't following on the heels of Lloyd Webber's success," he said. "But once I was able to do that, it wasn't difficult to help them see the potential of this interesting, unusual love story."

Producer Edgar Scherick recalled Tony Richardson was "a real miserable man. He was terrible. I didn't know he was sick with AIDS at the time. I had countless run-ins with Tony Richardson. He caused me untold trouble. He rewrote the script without anybody authorizing him to. I had to spend a week restoring the script to its original form, the script the network approved. The two women who worked with him said, 'To get along with him, just let him do whatever he wants to do.' I said, 'That's not my style.'"

== Reception ==
The miniseries won two Emmy Awards out of five nominations in 1990 for Outstanding Art Direction and Outstanding Achievement in Hairstyling for a Miniseries or a Special. It was also nominated for two Golden Globe Awards in 1991 for Best Mini-Series or Motion Picture Made for Television and Best Performance by an Actor in a Mini-Series or Motion Picture Made for Television (Burt Lancaster).

Entertainment Weekly critic Ken Tucker gave the film a score of A− and said Kopit and director Tony Richardson "make the romance between the Phantom and Christine both touching and frightening, and the casting of Burt Lancaster as Carriere, the manager of the opera company, gives the story weight and great charm...The Phantom of the Opera has a few old-fashioned but genuinely scary moments...It's as if Richardson went back to look at old horror movies by such filmmakers as Val Lewton and James Whale to figure out how they got their spooky but never gruesome effects". Although he found Adam Storke's Count de Chagny bland, he declared that: "...all in all, The Phantom of the Opera is a real achievement: It's rare enough for a costume drama to show up on TV these days; the fact that this is a good one is amazing."

People critic David Hiltbrand gave the film a score of B+ and said "Director Tony Richardson has mounted a sumptuous, stately version of this oft-told epic melodrama, far surpassing the previous TV version with Maximilian Schell and Jane Seymour in 1983. But Lon Chaney must be spinning in his grave, seeing what a rakish romantic his ghoulish Phantom has become over the years." Hiltbrand praised that Burt Lancaster "lends his usual air of refined dignity, and Charles Dance makes an elegant Phantom. But the real zest is provided by Ian Richardson and Andrea Ferreol, who bring great comic verve to the roles of the pompous popinjay of an opera director and his deluded diva of a wife."

The Deseret News critic Joseph Walker said, "Kopit's script maintains his vision throughout, expertly mixing moods ranging from the ridiculous ('I'm not used to killing people,' says the Phantom after a rare violent episode. 'It throws me off.') to the sublime. And the production values throughout are first rate..." Walker also added that Charles Dance is a "superb Phantom – brooding and mysterious, and yet somehow approachable. Polo makes the most of her big TV break, creating a flesh and blood heroine who is utterly believable...The rest of the cast is similarly effective, especially Ferreol who practically steals the show with her broad comic Carlotta."TV Guide gave the film four out of five stars and said Charles Dance is an "excellent Phantom" and "excellent support from Richardson and Lancaster."

The New York Times critic John J. O'Connor was puzzled how the recluse Phantom became "cultivated and talented" and criticized Adam Storke's performance and the "international menu of accents." However, he stated "the physical production is gloriously lavish...And the director Tony Richardson deftly captures the fairy-tale aspects of the story," describing the film as a "variation on Beauty and the Beast, with echoes of Cinderella and enchanted forests." He also stated that "most of the performances transcend the accent difficulties. Mr. Dance is elegant, Mr. Lancaster dignified and Miss Polo, not yet 20 years old, strikingly beautiful. The show is just about stolen, however, by Ian Richardson and Andrea Ferreol...," and concluded "Phantom adds up to an odd but fascinating prime-time diversion."
