= The Christmas Secret =

2000 television film by Ian Barry

- Written by: Bruce Graham
- Directed by: Ian Barry
- Starring: Richard Thomas; Beau Bridges; Maria Pitillo
- Music by: Jonathan Goldsmith
- Country of origin: United States
- Original language: English

Production
- Executive producers: Bert Stratford; Ric Zivic
- Cinematography: Frank Tidy
- Editor: Michael S. Murphy
- Running time: 100 minutes
- Production company: CBS Productions

Original release
- Network: CBS
- Release: December 17, 2000

The Christmas Secret is a 2000 American made-for-television family fantasy-drama film starring Richard Thomas and Beau Bridges based on the speculative book Flight of the Reindeer written by Robert Sullivan. It premiered on CBS on December 17, 2000.

As of 2009, it was shown in the 25 Days of Christmas programming block on ABC Family, but it was not part of the block in 2010. It was shown as part of the Twelve Days of Christmas on The Inspiration Network (INSP) Channel in 2012.

== Plot ==
A respected zoology professor (Richard Thomas) who is obsessed with proving that reindeer can actually fly meets up with the real Santa Claus (Beau Bridges).

== Cast ==
- Richard Thomas as Jerry McNeil
- Beau Bridges as Nick (Santa Claus)
- Maria Pitillo as Debbie
- Ed Gale as Kevin
- Jan Rubeš as Andree
- John Franklin as Morluv
- Debbie Lee Carrington as Gorah

== See also ==
- List of Christmas films
- Santa Claus in film
