= Ira Lewis =

American dramatist

- Born: Ira Lewis Metsky; 27 August 1932; Newark, New Jersey, United States
- Died: 4 April 2015 (aged 82); Edison, New Jersey, United States
- Occupation: Actor
- Years active: 1955–2004

Ira Lewis Metsky (27 August 1932 – 4 April 2015) was an American actor, writer, and playwright. Lewis was best known for his one-act play, Chinese Coffee, which opened at the Circle in the Square Theatre in 1992, starring Al Pacino. A film adaptation of Chinese Coffee, also starring Pacino, as well as Jerry Orbach, was released in 2000. Ira Lewis wrote the film's screenplay, while Pacino directed the adaptation.

== Biography ==
Lewis was born on August 27, 1932, in Newark, New Jersey. He studied acting and made his Broadway debut in Arthur Miller’s Incident at Vichy. In 1965, Lewis toured with a production of Long Day’s Journey Into Night.

Lewis died in Edison, New Jersey, of complications following heart surgery on 4 April 2015. He was a resident of Westfield, New Jersey.

== Filmography ==
- Personal Sergeant (2004)
- Loose Cannons (1990)
- Tough Guys Don't Dance (1987)
- The Equalizer (1987)
- Rollover (1981)
- Woman of Valor (1977)
- What's So Bad About Feeling Good? (1968)
- The Flesh Eaters (1964)
- Soft Skin on Black Silk (1959)
- The Phil Silvers Show (1957)
- I Spy (1955)
