= Susan Floyd =

American actress

- Born: May 13, 1968 (age 57); Cincinnati, Ohio, U.S.
- Occupation: Actress
- Years active: 1996–present
- Spouse: Brian Edward Doolittle (m. 2010)
- Children: 2

Susan Floyd (born May 13, 1968) is an American actress who has appeared in many episodes of Law & Order, as well as numerous other television series. She has also had featured roles in several motion pictures, including Domestic Disturbance and Forgiven, and starred opposite Al Pacino and Jerry Orbach in Chinese Coffee. Along with mainstream films, she has also appeared in a 2003 indie film Particles of Truth.She also appeared in the HBO prison drama series Oz as Genevieve Beecher.

== Personal life ==
Floyd has been married to Brian Edward Doolittle since 2010, and has 2 children with him.

== Filmography ==
Year	Title	Role	Notes
1996	Big Night	Joan	
1996	Breathing Room	Kathy	
1999	Random Hearts	Molly Roll	
2000	Chinese Coffee	Joanna	
2001	Domestic Disturbance	Diane	
2003	Particles of Truth	Louise	
2006	Forgiven	Kate Miles	
2006	Brother's Shadow	Emily	
2007	The Invasion	Pam	
2008	Tattered Angel	Julie Morrison	
