= Brother's Shadow =

- Directed by: Todd S. Yellin
- Written by: Todd S. Yellin; Ivan Krim
- Produced by: P. Jennifer Dana; Jeffrey Keswin; Michelle Lerner; Todd S. Yellin
- Starring: Scott Cohen; Judd Hirsch
- Cinematography: Kip Bogdahn
- Edited by: Suzanne Spangler
- Music by: Duncan Sheik
- Production companies: Fish Six Film LLC; Mint Pictures
- Distributed by: Cut Entertainment Group
- Release date: April 29, 2006 (Tribeca)
- Running time: 91 minutes
- Country: United States
- Language: English

Brother's Shadow is a 2006 American drama film starring Scott Cohen and Judd Hirsch.

== Plot ==
Jake Groden is the black sheep of his family. Ankle deep in fish guts, he serves out his parole in Alaska. Then, after a decade of self-imposed exile, he is forced to return to his Brooklyn family. He soon discovers that his perfect brother, Michael is dead, and he begins trying to take what Michael had- a beautiful wife, adoring son, control of the family furniture business and the love of their gruff father. For Jake, the price of a new life is his identity.

== Cast ==
- Scott Cohen as Jake Groden
- Judd Hirsch as Leo Groden
- Susan Floyd as Emily Groden
- Ruben Santiago-Hudson as Manny Botero
- Elliot Korte as Adam Groden
- James Murtaugh as Hank Stafford
