= Broadway's Finest =

- Theatrical release poster
- Directed by: Stephen Marro
- Written by: Stephen Marro
- Produced by: Jack Adalist; Stephen Marro
- Starring: Adam Storke; John Lavelle; Larry Pine
- Cinematography: Adrian Correia
- Edited by: John Zieman
- Music by: Ben Goldberg; Marshall Grantham
- Release date: 2012
- Running time: 88 minutes
- Country: United States
- Language: English

Broadway's Finest is a 2012 action film, directed and produced by Stephen Marro. It stars Adam Storke, John Lavelle and Larry Pine. The film won nine awards and was nominated for nine.

== Plot ==
Three struggling actors impersonate New York City Police Department undercover cops to take down a notorious drug dealer and obtain material for their edgy police drama.

== Cast ==
- John Lavelle ... Goldstone
- Adam Storke ... Lewis
- Nick Cornish ... Willy
- Larry Pine ... A.K. Lipson
- Lauren Hodges ... Lauren
- Robert Clohessy ... Buckley
- Robert Funaro ... Larson
- David Lansbury ... Bane
- Thomas G. Waites ... Caesar
- Chris Kerson ... Saveno
- Mark Lotito ... Captain Harrison
- Mark Price ... Shelly

== Awards ==
=== Won ===
- 2012 Hoboken International Film Festival:
  - Best Director - Stephen Marro
- 2012 Long Island International Film Expo
  - Audience Award
  - Best Editing - John Zieman
  - Best Original Score - Marshall Grantham and Ben Goldberg
  - Honorable Mention - John Petersen
- 2012 New York Visionfest
  - Best Writing - Stephen Marro
  - The Abe Schrager Award for Cinematography - Adrian Correia
- 2012 Hills Film Festival
  - Best Screenwriting
- Prescott Film Festival:
  - Best Screenplay

=== Nominated ===
- 2012 Hoboken International Film Festival
  - Best Supporting Actor - Adam Storke
- 2012 Long Island International Film Expo
  - Best Feature Film
  - Best Long Island Feature
  - Best Director
- 2012 New York Visionfest:
  - Best Acting - Adam Storke
  - Best Directing - Stephen Marro
  - Best Score - Ben Goldberg and Marshall Grantham
  - Best Sound - Paul Goodrich
  - Best Production - Doug LeClaire and Jack Adalist
