= Rita Morley =

American actress (1927–1997)

Rita Morley (born Rita Imogene Gann; October 10, 1927 – June 28, 1997) was an American actor in television, on radio, and on Broadway.

== Early life ==
Rita Imogene Gann was born in West Hartford, Connecticut, to Harry Gann and Minnie Minerva Sybil Gann (born Horowitz) of 116 Foxcroft Road. She attended the Julius Hartt College of Music and later taught there. She took the stage name Rita Morley because Rita Gann was too similar to Rita Gam. Morley was her brother's name.

== Career ==
She started on a children's radio program on WDRC at the age of six. At the age of nine, she had her own regular radio variety show on WTIC.

During high school, she served as a pianist for the Bridgeport Symphony Orchestra.

In the 1950s, she frequently appeared in commercials for Coty Inc., a beauty and cosmetics company. As a result, she was referred to as America's Most Televised Girl.

In the early 1950s, she appeared on Fairmeadows USA and other television shows. In the 1950s and 1960s, she appeared in As the World Turns, The Edge of Night, and The Secret Storm, all soap operas, as well as guest panelist on ‘’What's My Line’’. Later, she was cast in Texas (TV series).

She debuted on Broadway in The Seven Year Itch as the wife, replacing Neva Patterson. She also appeared in The Impossible Years.

In movies, she appeared in The Flesh Eaters (1964).

Morley was a board member of both the American Federation of Television and Radio Artists and the Screen Actors Guild. Under the name Rita Morley Harvey, she wrote a book, Those Wonderful, Terrible Years: George Heller and the American Federation of Television and Radio Artists (Southern Illinois University Press, 1996), which was “a history of the union’s struggle with blacklisting of suspected Communists in the 1950s.”

== Personal life ==
Morley married Kenneth Harvey, an actor, at Temple Beth Israel in West Hartford on November 24, 1957.
