= Forgiven (2006 film) =

- Movie poster
- Directed by: Paul Fitzgerald
- Written by: Paul Fitzgerald
- Produced by: Tracy Kilpatrick (Associate producer); Kelly Miller (Producer); Mimi Wyeth (Line producer)
- Starring: Paul Fitzgerald; Russell Hornsby; Kate Jennings Grant
- Cinematography: Vanja Cernjul
- Edited by: Shelby Siegel
- Release date: January 23, 2006
- Running time: 81 minutes
- Country: United States
- Language: English

Forgiven is a 2006 film directed by Paul Fitzgerald starring Paul Fitzgerald, Russell Hornsby and Kate Jennings Grant.

== Cast ==
- Paul Fitzgerald as Peter Miles
- Russell Hornsby as Ronald Bradler
- Kate Jennings Grant as Jamie Doyle
- Susan Floyd as Kate Miles

== Accolades ==
| Year | Award | Category/Recipient(s) | Result |
|---|---|---|---|
| 2006 | Jury Prize | Best Lead Actor - Male (Russell Hornsby); Best Screenplay (Paul Fitzgerald); Best Supporting Actor - Female (Kate Jennings Grant) Tied with Ana Claudia Talancón for The Virgin of Juarez (2006) | Won |
| 2006 | Grand Jury Prize | Dramatic (Paul Fitzgerald) | Nominated |
