= Maria Pitillo =

American retired actress

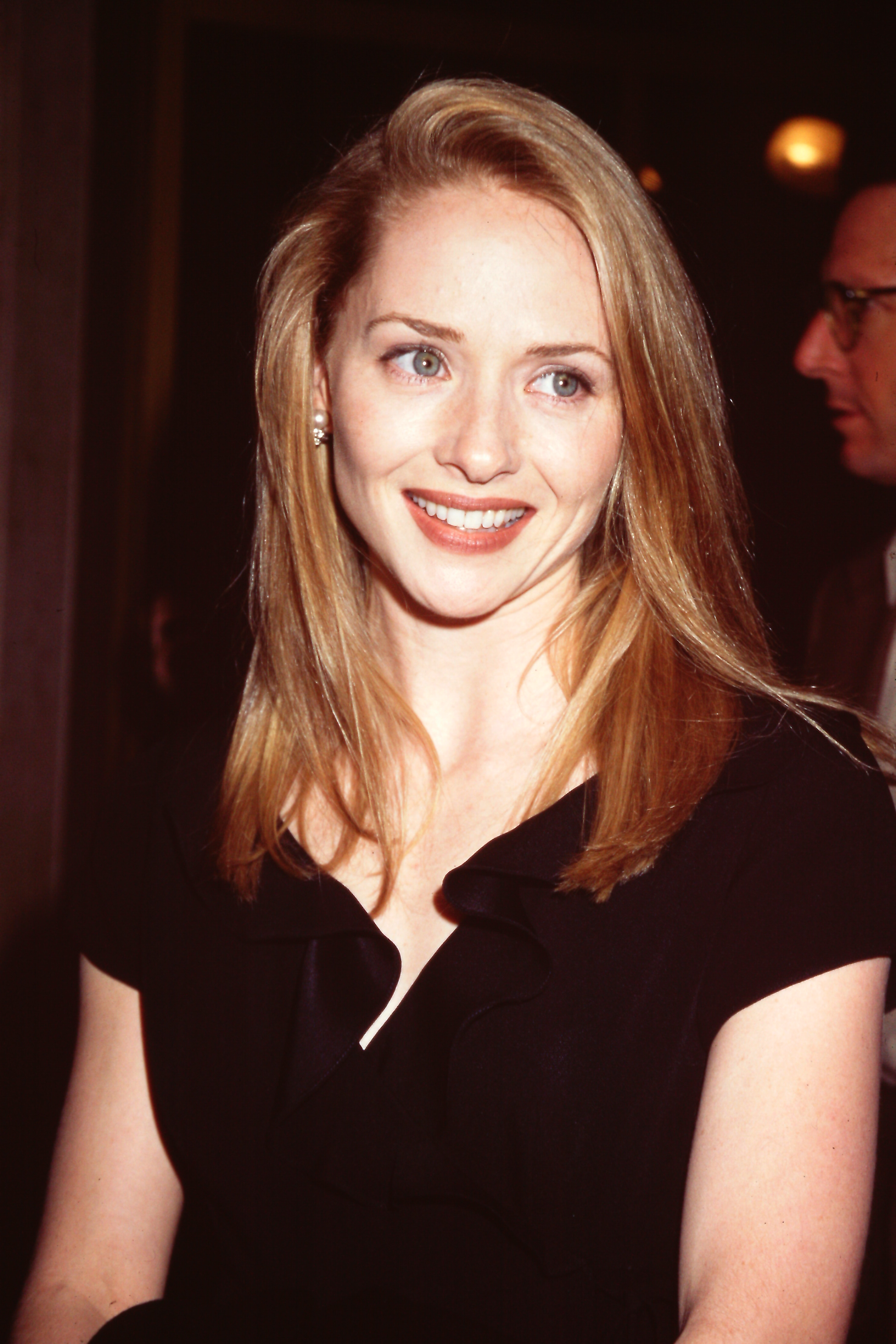
- Pitillo at the premiere of Bye Bye Love in 1995
- Born: January 8, 1966 (age 60); Elmira, New York, U.S.
- Occupation: Actress
- Years active: 1986–2008
- Spouse: David R. Fortney (m. 2002-2025) (his death)
- Children: 1

Maria Pitillo (born January 8, 1966) is an American retired actress. She has starred in films and on television, most notably as Audrey Timmonds in Godzilla (1998). She also had a recurring role on the television series Providence.

== Early life and education ==
Pitillo was born on January 8, 1966, in Elmira, New York, and grew up in Mahwah, New Jersey. Her parents divorced and her father moved Maria and her sisters, Lisa and Gina, to Mahwah, New Jersey. She attended Mahwah High School, where she was on the track team, before transferring to Northern Highlands Regional High School. She was prevented from attending her high school graduation ceremony after an altercation with her English teacher.

== Career ==
=== 1986–1992 ===
Pitillo was living in suburban New Jersey, and working as a department store clerk when a friend invited her to audition for a TV commercial. Her first job was an advertisement for Pepto Bismol. Subsequent commercial work included an ad for Bank of Boston, York Peppermint Pattie, Kentucky Fried Chicken, and Chic Jeans, among others. In the fall of 1987, Pitillo was cast as Nancy Don (Lewis) on the ABC soap opera, Ryan's Hope, which lasted until that series ended its run in 1989.

Pitillo later said that she did not consider acting as a serious career choice until after Chaplin (1992).

=== 1990s ===
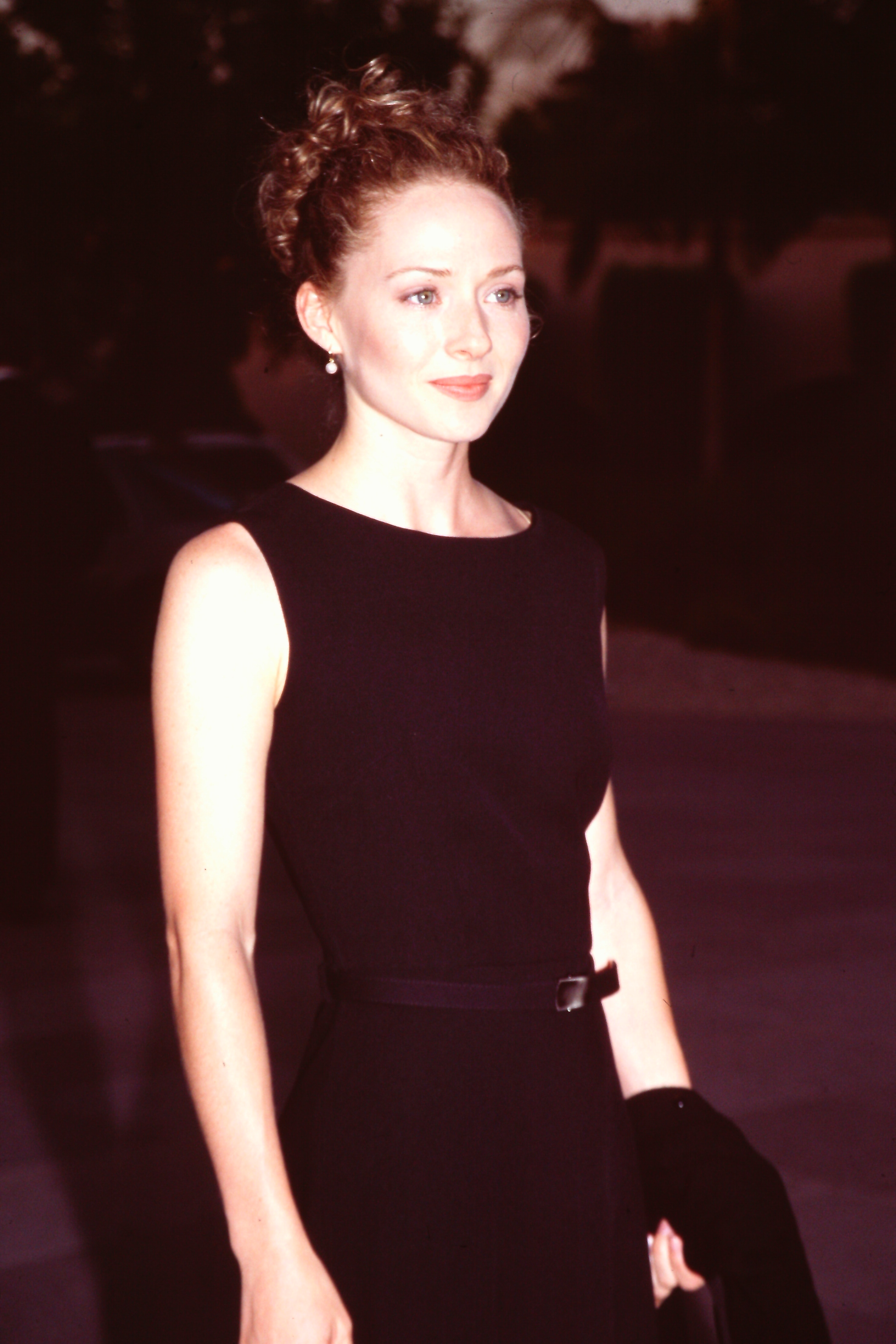
Pitillo in 1995

Upon moving to Hollywood, Pitillo's work consisted primarily of television drama (South of Sunset), small parts in theatrical motion pictures, and included starring roles in several Made-For-TV movies. She earned critical praise for her roles in the following: Middle Ages, Escape from Terror: The Teresa Stamper Story, as well as Between Love and Honor. Pitillo's career breakthrough came with the 1995 FOX sitcom Partners. Cast as Alicia Sondergard, the comedy met with critical success for herself, as well as for co-stars Jon Cryer, and Tate Donovan. Partners failed to gain traction with audiences, however, and was cancelled in the Spring of 1996.

After completing Dear God in the summer of 1996, Pitillo was contacted by NBC President Warren Littlefield, who had taken notice of her performance in Partners. Littlefield then signed her to a development deal with the network.

In early 1997, while trying to acquire a stake in DreamWorks Studios, NBC tried to leverage Pitillo, as well as director James Burrows, with a project titled Nearly Yours, which actress Parker Posey had dropped out of. DreamWorks and NBC could not come to an agreement, and the deal collapsed. The squabbling between NBC and DreamWorks left the network with a programming hole, and Pitillo without a television project for all of 1997. It wasn't until filming began on Something To Believe In (1997), and Godzilla (May 1997), that she returned to work. NBC continued to search for a suitable television project for Pitillo, and with input from Littlefield, developed the sitcom House Rules, which aired as a mid-season replacement in March 1998.

=== Godzilla (1998) ===
Pitillo starred as Audrey Timmonds in the TriStar Pictures film Godzilla, which opened in theaters on May 20, 1998. The film was skewered by fans and critics alike, with Pitillo's performance being particularly criticized:

"At its release, the film was much criticized by Godzilla fans the world over. Kenpachiro Satsuma, the actor who portrayed Godzilla in the second series of films (1984–1995) walked out of a Tokyo screening and told reporters that, 'It's not Godzilla, it does not have the spirit."

Godzilla was nominated in several categories for Razzie awards, and Pitillo herself won the Golden Raspberry Award for Worst Supporting Actress in 1999. Pitillo is known to have commented once about her role in Godzilla:

"This movie isn't written for big performances from its actors," Pitillo says. "I don't expect a lot from it. It won't be like, 'Oh, Maria Pitillo is a great actress.' But it's an opportunity for people to see me."

=== Godzilla 2 (1999) ===
Pitillo, Matthew Broderick, and Jean Reno were each under contract for a total of three Godzilla films. The first installment, having earned $379 million during its theatrical run, ensured that a sequel would be considered. TriStar Pictures, which owned the rights to the franchise, called on Centropolis to begin pre-production work on a sequel, which was tentatively titled Godzilla 2. Ultimately, there was little enthusiasm to move forward, and the rights to the franchise were allowed to expire.

=== Late career ===
By 2000, Pitillo had starred in the indie film Dirk & Betty and the comedy-drama After Sex, and made guest appearances on several television shows. Her last film role was the made-for-TV movie The Christmas Secret, starring Richard Thomas and Beau Bridges. It originally aired on CBS, and later broadcast on the ABC Family network as part of their 25 Days of Christmas. She had a recurring role on Providence (2001–2002) as Tina Calcatera, a divorced mother, and love interest of Robbie, played by Seth Peterson, a role which lasted until the series ended in 2002.

=== Unsold pilots ===
In 1998, Pitillo appeared in In the Loop with Joely Fisher and Lisa Edelstein. Seven scripts were written and a pilot episode directed by James Burrows was produced. The following year, Pitillo again worked with Burrows on People Who Fear People, which also starred Jon Cryer. Pitillo's role was recast, and the series became The Trouble With Normal in 2000. In 2003, she filmed a pilot of Follow the Leeds with Sharon Lawrence and Marsha Mason, which competed with three other pilots for slot in Lifetime Televisions Fall 2003 line up. In 2006, Pitillo appeared alongside Mitch Rouse and Kiernan Shipka in The Angriest Man in Suburbia.

== Personal life ==
Pitillo married David R. Fortney in 2002, and lives in Ross, California. She is of Italian and Irish descent.

It is most often noted that Pitillo got into acting after a chance encounter with a friend, while some publicity material suggests that participating in Summer stock theater provided Pitillo the impetus to act professionally.

== Filmography ==
=== Film ===
Year	Title	Role	Notes
1986	Wise Guys	Massuese	
1988	Bright Lights, Big City	Pony Tail Girl	
1988	Spike of Bensonhurst	Angel	
1989	She-Devil	Olivia Honey	
1990	White Palace	Janey	
1992	Chaplin	Mary Pickford	
1993	True Romance	Kandi	
1994	I'll Do Anything	Flight Attendant	
1994	Natural Born Killers	Deborah	
1994	Frank and Jesse	Zee	
1995	Bye Bye Love	Kim	
1996	Dear God	Gloria McKinney	
1998	Something to Believe In	Maggie	
1998	Godzilla	Audrey Timmonds	Golden Raspberry Award for Worst Supporting Actress
2000	After Sex	Vicki	
2000	Dirk & Betty	Betty	

=== Television ===
Year	Title	Role	Notes
1987	CBS Schoolbreak Special	Vickie	Episode: "What If I'm Gay?"
1989	Ryan's Hope	Nancy Don Lewis	Recurring role (5 episodes)
1989	Miami Vice	Anna	Episode: "The Cell Within"
1990	The Lost Capone	Annie	Television film
1991	Law & Order	Angel Greer	Episode: "Aria"
1991	Saturday's	Chelsea	Television film
1992	Middle Ages	Robin	Episode: "Night Moves"
1993	Cooperstown	Bridget	Television film
1993	Mad About You	Mimi	Episode: "The Man Who Said Hello"
1993	South of Sunset	Gina Weston	Main role
1995	Escape from Terror: The Teresa Stamper Story	Teresa Walden Stamper	Television film
1995	Between Love and Honor	Maria Caprefoli	Television film
1995–1996	Partners	Alicia Sundergard	Main role
1996	Out of Order	unknown role	Television short; episode: "Refracted"
1998	House Rules	Casey Farrell	Main role
1998	In the Loop	Unknown role	Unknown episode
1999	Ally McBeal	Paula Hunt	Episode: "Civil War"
1999	Early Edition	Rebecca Waters	Episode: "Weather Girl"
2000	Will & Grace	Paula	Episode: "Love Plus One"
2000	The Christmas Secret	Debbie McNeil	Television film
2001–2002	Providence	Tina Calcatera (later Tina Hansen)	Recurring role (31 episodes)
2003	Friends	Laura the adoption agent	Episode: "The One with the Home Study"
2008	Big Shots	Valerie Cerritas	Episode: "Sex Be Not Proud"
