= Prey (American TV series) =

1998 American science fiction television series

- Main cast
- Created by: William Schmidt
- Starring: Debra Messing; Adam Storke; Larry Drake; Frankie Faison; Vincent Ventresca; James Morrison; Roger Howarth
- Country of origin: United States
- Original language: English
- No. of seasons: 1
- No. of episodes: 13

Production
- Executive producers: Charlie Craig; William Schmidt
- Producers: Donald Marcus; Phil Parslow
- Production companies: Edelson Productions; Lars Thorwald Inc.; Warner Bros. Television

Original release
- Network: ABC
- Release: January 15 – July 9, 1998

Prey is an American science fiction television series that aired for one season (13 episodes) in 1998 on ABC. The series stars Debra Messing, Adam Storke, Larry Drake, Frankie Faison, James Morrison, Roger Howarth, and Vincent Ventresca. It was commissioned by ABC following their decision to cancel Lois & Clark: The New Adventures of Superman after four seasons, despite having originally announced a fifth. Prey's commissioning fulfilled ABC's contract with Warner Bros. Television.

== Premise ==
The series follows Dr. Sloan Parker (Debra Messing), a bio-anthropologist studying genetic variation in humans. Sloan's mentor, Dr. Ann Coulter, is a geneticist who believes that the violent behavior of certain criminals may have a genetic basis. She has collected genetic samples from a variety of convicted murderers and other violent criminals and is currently preparing to serve as an expert witness in the trial of an accused serial killer. After the killer escapes and murders Dr. Coulter, Sloan discovers her body, along with a collection of data demonstrating that many violent criminals—especially serial killers—often share a fairly large number of genetic markers that set them apart from normal human beings, rendering them as genetically different from humans as humans are from chimpanzees. They are a new species of hominid, or very manlike ape, characterized as being capable of "unspeakable evil", much like a human sociopath.

Sloan shares Dr. Coulter's discovery with fellow scientists, law-enforcement personnel, and a few others, and soon comes to realize that the new species is on the verge of supplanting humankind in the same way that Homo sapiens supplanted the Neanderthals at the end of the last ice age, even theorizing that their emergence might be connected to global warming.

Meanwhile, as the escaped killer cuts a murderous swath through California, Sloan makes the acquaintance of Tom Daniels (Adam Storke), a federal agent determined to capture him. Tom is eventually revealed to be a member of the new species himself and describes them as "hunting" human beings the same way humans hunt deer and other animals, hence the show's title. Daniels leads Sloan and others to a well-hidden cave, in which is found a rather large pile of the personal effects—such as wallets, eyeglasses, shoes, belts—of a great many people. Daniels advises that these trophy hoards are used as status displays among his kind, and further advises that he wanted the investigators to know "exactly what you're dealing with". Serial killers often collect trophies of their kills, and the new species does the same.

Upon learning that the new species can breed with humanity, but due to their dominant genetic traits, the children of such a pairing are always the new species, they are given the name Homo dominant.

== Development ==
The original pilot of the show was titled Hungry for Survival and starred Sherilynn Fenn in the role.

== Traits of Homo dominant ==
Dominants (Homo dominant) are 1.6% different from normal humans (H. sapiens).

Dominants are stronger, more intelligent, and more aggressive than H. sapiens and are convinced that as a superior form of life, they are entitled to subjugate their human relatives by whatever means necessary. They often express an antipathy toward human beings that borders on racism. Their aggression towards H. sapiens is portrayed as an instinctive genetic characteristic, present even in young children, for the purpose of their own survival as a species, though this could have been a skewed conclusion, as most of the early genetic information was drawn from the criminal population (those genetic samples being readily available).

Dominants also possess various psychic traits, including the ability to cloud the minds of others, sense other members of their own species telepathically, see 10 seconds into the future, and sense emotions empathically. The show does not make clear that these are actually extrasensory perception, but Sloan and other investigators are advised that Dominants are definitely aware of others who are quite nearby, and use this ability to co-ordinate group actions such as paramilitary operations or simple hunting of humans as sport.

The Dominants are able to exist comfortably in much warmer climates than humans, barely perspiring even in desert conditions. They have smaller crania than humans with their brains displaying greater synaptic interconnectivity, neural density, and processing speed as a result. The proximate half-century-old mummified remains of a 9-year-old Dominant girl, pregnant with four fetuses, reveal that the females of their species possess four uteri. However, the remains suggest that some young females at that time died due to some complications, but that now (present time) they have evolved enough that Dominant young females of that age can give birth (up to four children at a time) without any birth complications - and with ease. At least some of the time, these children are identical quadruplets.

Sloan speculates at one point, as many as 200,000 members of the new species may exist. Their point of origin is revealed to be a deserted village in Oaxaca, Mexico, a location the Dominants regard as sacred. It is also the location of a mysterious monolith with arcane writings on its surface. The location is thought to have once been a swamp-like environment, with the villagers living in huge old ruins, but due to some type of climate change, the area quickly changed into a desert.

Some groups of humans are aware of the Dominants and collaborate with them. Similarly, some groups of Dominants wish to co-exist peacefully with humans. Technologically, the Dominants use genetic engineering in an attempt to "convert" humans into members of their own species. They also make use of cloning and nanotechnology.

== Episodes ==
No.	Title	Directed by	Written by	Original release date	Prod. code
0	"Hungry for Survival"	Tobe Hooper	William Schmidt	Unaired pilot	467050
1	"Existence"	Peter O'Fallon	William Schmidt	January 15, 1998	467051
2	"Discovery"	Dan Lerner	Story by : Charlie Craig & Jeremy R. Littman; Teleplay by : Chris Levinson	January 22, 1998	467052
3	"Pursuit"	Stephen Cragg	Laurence Andries	January 29, 1998	467053
4	"Origins"	Bill Corcoran	Donald Marcus	February 5, 1998	467054
5	"Revelations"	Jim Charleston	Laurence Andries & Chris Levinson	February 19, 1998	467055
6	"Infiltration"	Winrich Kolbe	Charlie Craig & Jeremy R. Littman	March 5, 1998	467056
7	"Transformations"	James A. Contner	Donald Marcus	March 12, 1998	467057
8	"Veil"	Martha Mitchell	Charlie Craig & Jeremy R. Littman	March 19, 1998	467058
9	"Collaboration"	Ian Toynton	Laurence Andries & Chris Levinson	June 11, 1998	467059
10	"Sleeper"	Vern Gillum	Donald Marcus	June 18, 1998	467060
11	"Vengeance"	Bill Corcoran	Laurence Andries	June 25, 1998	467061
12	"Progeny"	Terrence O'Hara	Story by : James Halpern; Teleplay by : Donald Marcus	July 2, 1998	467062
13	"Deliverance: Part 1"	Bill Corcoran	Charlie Craig & Jeremy R. Littman	July 9, 1998	467063
