= Paul Fitzgerald (actor) =

American actor, director and writer

- Born: New York City, New York, U.S.
- Education: Northwestern University (BA); University of San Diego (MFA)
- Years active: 1996–present

Paul Fitzgerald is an American actor, director and writer. Fitzgerald is best known for directing, writing and starring in the film Forgiven, portraying fictional US president Perry Morgan in Netflix series The Residence, and for his roles in the films The Secret Life of Walter Mitty, Teenage Mutant Ninja Turtles and Arbitrage. Fitzgerald is also known for his appearances in the television series Younger, Veep, Treme and Guiding Light, and for playing Garry LeJeune in the Broadway production Noises Off.

== Early life ==
Born in New York City, New York, and raised in Lynchburg, Virginia, Fitzgerald graduated from Northwestern University in 1993 and obtained his Master's degree at the Old Globe/University of San Diego Drama School.

== Career ==
=== Film ===
Fitzgerald and his producing partner, Kelly Miller, formed their company, Pulled Pictures, in 2004 to produce Paul's directorial debut feature, Forgiven. Fitzgerald also wrote and starred in Forgiven, which won the Jury Prize for Best Male Actor (Hornsby), Best Supporting Actress (Grant) and Best Screenplay (Fitzgerald) at the BendFilm Festival, and was nominated for the Grand Jury Prize at the Sundance Film Festival. Fitzgerald is also known for his roles in Arbitrage, The Secret Life of Walter Mitty, Teenage Mutant Ninja Turtles, Helena from the Wedding, Crazy like a Fox and Jackie Goldberg Private Dick.

=== Television ===
Fitzgerald is known for his roles in the television series Younger, Veep, Deadbeat, Treme, Guiding Light, The Bedford Diaries, Opposite Sex, M.Y.O.B, and The Residence. He has also appeared in series such as The Good Wife, Golden Boy, The Americans, Royal Pains, The Mentalist, Law & Order, The West Wing, Boardwalk Empire, Blue Bloods, Lights Out, Fringe and John Adams.

=== Theatre ===
Fitzgerald has appeared in the Broadway production Noises Off as Garry LeJeune, and the downtown rock musical Debbie Does Dallas.

== Personal life ==
Fitzgerald was a member of the 1988 E.C. Glass High School football team that won the Virginia 3A State Championship. He is the nephew of progressive talk radio personality Stephanie Miller and grandson of William E. Miller, who ran as vice-president with Barry Goldwater in 1964 presidential election, against Lyndon Johnson and Hubert Humphrey.

In 2011, he joined the "I am Visible" campaign and appeared on the cover of Bi-Social magazine where he proclaimed his bisexuality. He has appeared as bisexual characters in roles on Law & Order: Special Victims Unit and Will & Grace, and as a gay character on The Residence. As of 2017, Fitzgerald lives in New York City.
