= Something to Believe In (film) =

- Theatrical release poster
- Directed by: John Hough
- Written by: John Goldsmith; John Hough
- Produced by: Lew Grade; John Hough
- Starring: William McNamara; Tom Conti; Maria Pitillo
- Cinematography: Tony Pierce-Roberts
- Edited by: Peter Tanner
- Music by: Lalo Schifrin
- Distributed by: Warner Bros. (United Kingdom)
- Release date: 8 May 1998 (United Kingdom)
- Running time: 113 minutes
- Countries: United Kingdom; Germany
- Language: English

Something to Believe In is a 1998 drama film directed by John Hough and starring William McNamara, Tom Conti, and Maria Pitillo.

== Plot ==
Reports of a crying Madonna statue in Italy make their way to Las Vegas, where Maggie (Maria Pitillo), a blackjack dealer recently given a grim diagnosis, decides to embark on a journey of faith. She travels to Europe in the hope that witnessing the Madonna in person could offer redemption or healing. Hitchhiking her way through Italy, she crosses paths with Mike (William McNamara), a pianist heading to Naples for a pivotal concert he hopes will transform his life.

== Production ==
The film was produced by Lew Grade who put his own money in the movie. The film took four and a half years to raise finance for.

== Reception ==
The film received poor reviews and was a box office failure. It could not obtain a US distributor.
