= House Rules (1998 TV series) =

- Also known as: One Big Happy Family
- Genre: Sitcom
- Created by: Roberto Benabib; Karl Fink
- Starring: Maria Pitillo; Bradley White; David Newsom
- Composer: Dan Foliart
- Country of origin: United States
- Original language: English
- No. of seasons: 1
- No. of episodes: 7

Production
- Executive producers: Roberto Benabib; Karl Fink
- Camera setup: Multi-camera
- Running time: 30 minutes
- Production companies: Christopher Thompson Productions; Columbia TriStar Television; NBC Studios

Original release
- Network: NBC
- Release: March 9 – June 8, 1998

House Rules is an American sitcom television series created by Roberto Benabib and Karl Fink, that aired from March 9 to June 8, 1998, on NBC. The show stars Maria Pitillo, Bradley White, and David Newsom.

In April 1998, NBC pulled the series from the schedule after five low-rated episodes, then rescheduled on remaining 2 episodes on June 1, 1998.

== Premise ==
Three friends from childhood, Casey, a District Attorney, Thomas, a reporter, and William, a medical student, live together in a house in Denver, Colorado.

== Cast ==
- Maria Pitillo as Casey Farrell
- Bradley White as Thomas Riley
- David Newsom as William McCuskey

== Episodes ==
No.	Title	Directed by	Written by	Original release date	Prod. code
1	"Pilot"	Michael Lembeck	Roberto Benabib & Karl Fink and Chris Thompson	March 9, 1998	100
The boys tries to convince Casey to stay instead of moving to Paris with her new boyfriend.
2	"Sex and Violence"	Michael Lembeck	Adam Hamburger	March 16, 1998	104
Riley and McCuskey feel inadequate when Casey is the one who jumps into action when a burglar breaks into their house.
3	"Large Flightless Birds"	Michael Lembeck	Chris Thompson	March 23, 1998	101
Casey is upset when Riley and McCuskey doesn't want to go with her on their annual vacation.
4	"Twisted Sister"	Jim Drake	Charlie Richards	March 30, 1998	106
McCuskey's sister is encouraged to become a nun.
5	"Riley's New Job"	Michael Lembeck	Charlie Richards	April 13, 1998	102
Casey is promoted to district attorney, and Riley is hired as her new secretary. McCuskey is dating a female doctor.
6	"Dude Act Like a Lady"	Michael Lembeck	Chris Thompson	June 1, 1998	105
Casey and McCuskey thinks Riley might want a sex change.
7	"Who Knew?"	Robby Benson	Wendy Goldman	June 8, 1998	103
The gang gets trapped in the basement and flash back to the senior prom.
