= Chinese Coffee =

2000 independent film

- Directed by: Al Pacino
- Written by: Ira Lewis
- Based on: Chinese Coffee by Ira Lewis
- Produced by: James Bulleit; Anne D'Amato; Michael Hadge; Larry Meistrich; John Mollura; Robert Salerno
- Starring: Al Pacino; Jerry Orbach; Susan Floyd; Ellen McElduff; Gary Marinoff
- Cinematography: Frank Prinzi
- Edited by: Michael Berenbaum; Pasquale Buba; Noah Herzog
- Music by: Elmer Bernstein
- Distributed by: Chal Productions; Fox Searchlight Pictures
- Release date: September 2000 (Telluride)
- Running time: 99 minutes
- Country: United States
- Language: English

Chinese Coffee is a 2000 American independent drama film starring Al Pacino and Jerry Orbach. It is directed by Pacino and written by Ira Lewis, adapted from his play. Two longtime friends in New York City struggle with their relationship, which has become contentious after years of mistrust and resentment over professional and personal failures.

It premiered at the 2000 Telluride Film Festival, and was also screened at the 2000 Tribeca Film Festival, where it was introduced by Robert De Niro.

== Plot ==
In 1982 Greenwich Village, Harry Levine is a struggling writer barely eking out a living as a doorman. When he is fired, he visits his friend Jake Manheim, an arts photographer, to collect an old debt. When Jake says that he does not have the money, the two engage in an all-night conversation about their respective art, past and present loves, and the directions that their lives are heading.

== Production ==
=== Genesis ===
The screenplay is an adaptation of a two character, one-act play of the same name written by Lewis. Unlike the film, all of the action takes place in Manheim's small Greenwich Village apartment. The film was produced and released thirteen years after Chinese Coffee's initial stage debut. The first fully staged production was an off-Broadway closed-ended run in August 1987 at the Apple Corps Theatre in New York City. It was produced by Robert Barash, directed by David Margulies, starred Al Pacino as Harry Levine, and Marvin Silbersher as Jacob Manheim.

The play later premiered at the Circle in the Square Theatre on Broadway in 1992, directed by Arvin Brown, with Pacino reprising his role as Harry Levine, and Charles Cioffi cast as Jacob Manheim.

=== Film title ===
"Chinese Coffee" refers to a scene in which Levine explains to Manheim why he thinks a cup of coffee in Chinatown restaurants is superior to any other because they use the best beans, brewed fresh in Silex glass pots, and they give you real cream. Chinese Coffee is also a metaphor for the safety that Levine feels when he is in one of these restaurants.

Al Pacino directs the 2000 film adaptation of Chinese Coffee, in which he stars with Jerry Orbach. Ira Lewis, who wrote the original play, also penned the screenplay for the film.

The film adaptation was released in New York as part of the Tribeca Film Festival. Shot almost exclusively as a one-to-one conversation between the two main characters, it chronicles friendship, love, loss and humor of daily life. After years of withholding it, Pacino allowed it to be released on DVD on June 19, 2007, as a part of a three-movie box set called Pacino: An Actor's Vision.

Reportedly, Howard Shore composed the film's score before Elmer Bernstein was hired to replace him.
