= Highway to Hell (film) =

1992 film by Ate de Jong

- VHS release cover
- Directed by: Ate de Jong
- Written by: Brian Helgeland
- Produced by: John Byers; Mary Ann Page
- Starring: Patrick Bergin; Adam Storke; Chad Lowe; Kristy Swanson; Richard Farnsworth
- Cinematography: Robin Vidgeon
- Edited by: Todd Ramsay; Randy D. Thornton
- Music by: Hidden Faces
- Production companies: Goodman/Rosen Productions; Josa; High Street Pictures
- Distributed by: Hemdale
- Release date: March 13, 1992 (US)
- Running time: 94 minutes
- Country: United States
- Language: English
- Budget: $7.5 million
- Box office: $26,055

Highway to Hell is a 1992 American B horror comedy film directed by Ate de Jong and starring Chad Lowe, Kristy Swanson and Patrick Bergin. It was written by Brian Helgeland. The film tells the story of Charlie Sykes (Lowe) and his girlfriend Rachel Clark (Swanson), who is kidnapped by a demon and taken to Hell to become one of Satan's brides, while Charlie must travel to the other dimension to rescue her.

The film features cameo appearances by Lita Ford, Gilbert Gottfried, actor Ben Stiller, his sister Amy Stiller and their parents, Jerry Stiller and Anne Meara. In 2019, Gottfried reprised his role as Adolf Hitler from the film in the comedy television series Historical Roasts.

== Synopsis ==
Charlie Sykes and Rachel Clark are a young all-American couple who decide to run away and elope in Las Vegas. On the road to Vegas, they ignore a warning by the local gas station attendant, Sam, and take an abandoned backroad where Rachel is kidnapped by a zombie Hell Cop, who takes her to hell. Sam explains the situation and gives Charlie a shotgun with special ammo and a car that holds a special attribute. After a few attempts, Charlie passes through the portal to hell, an expansive desert with buildings scattered about.

On the highway, Charlie meets other dead people that live in Hell and even a motorcycle gang led by the rebel Royce, who thwarts Rachel's escape attempt at Pluto's Diner. Charlie manages to catch up to Hell Cop, but his car gets shot up during the chase and becomes disabled. His car is then taken by the repair man, Beezle, who is able to fix the car. Charlie continues his pursuit and finds that Beezle's kid assistant, Adam, had snuck into the car, wanting to help him find Rachel and keep his dog Ben company. Adam tells him that Hell Cop killed his family, took him to hell and gave him to Beezle. Charlie promises to bring him back with him.

Charlie eventually tracks down Hell Cop and Rachel at a nightclub/casino. He tries to free Rachel, but Hell Cop fatally shoots Charlie before they both leave. Fortunately, Beezle arrives and secures a promise from Adam to come back with him if he uses his repair powers to save Charlie, allowing him to continue his pursuit. Charlie decides to try a shortcut but is warned against it by Clara, Royce's girlfriend and Sam's ex. Charlie ignores this and seems to defeat Hell Cop and saves Rachel, who is sexually aggressive towards him. He finds out from her reflection that this "Rachel" is a demon in disguise. After defeating the demon, Charlie heads back on the highway and makes it to the outskirts of Hell City.

With his dog Ben distracting Cerberus, Charlie convinces Charon to give him a ride over the River Styx to the city. Charlie is able to sneak his way around and make it to Rachel. Satan then appears, wanting Rachel as a bride. Since Charlie went through all that trouble, Satan decides to let them go in a take on the myth of Orpheus and Eurydice, where Charlie cannot look back at Rachel. When Charlie does, a large group of minions appear. The young couple manages to break into Hell Cop's car and use its power to break through the wall and jump over the river to their car.

Charlie goes back to Beezle's place to get Adam, but finds his repair shop had become a mansion. Beezle comes out, revealing that he is actually Satan. He refuses to allow Charlie to take Adam. Charlie proposes a deal: a race against Hell Cop. If he loses, both Rachel and Adam would stay in hell. As the race begins, Royce drives up to Charlie, demanding to be let inside as he wants to return to the real world. Charlie refuses, and Royce responds by trying to stab Adam. Clara covers his eyes, causing both to crash into a ravine. Just as Hell Cop is about to disable Charlie's car, Rachel finds a switch which releases nitro that propels their car through the portal, winning the race. However, Hell Cop follows them, seeking revenge. As he is about to kill Charlie, Rachel shoots Hell Cop in his one weakness, his sunglasses, causing him to blow up.

Scrolling text reveals the whereabouts of the main characters after the film's events. Rachel and Charlie get married and use their experience in Hell to create successful video games and pizzeria chains, Sam continues to warn drivers about the road, Adam is returned to Earth with relatives, and Beezle continues his evil plans as normal.

== Cast ==
- Patrick Bergin as Beezle
- Adam Storke as Royce
- Chad Lowe as Charlie Sykes
- Kristy Swanson as Rachel Clark
- Pamela Gidley as Clara
- Jarrett Lennon as Adam
- C.J. Graham as Sgt. Bedlam, Hellcop
- Richard Farnsworth as Sam
- Lita Ford as The Hitchhiker
- Gilbert Gottfried as Hitler
- Anne Meara as Medea, Waitress in Pluto's
- Rags as Mr. Ben
- Amy Stiller as Cleopatra
- Ben Stiller as Pluto's Cook/Attila
- Jerry Stiller as The Desk Cop
- Das Psycho Rangers:
  - Be Deckard as Dentist, Royce's Gang
  - Darren Mark Edwards as Clown, Royce's Gang
  - Troy Tempest as Exterminator, Royce's Gang
  - Julian Charles Wright as Doctor, Royce's Gang
- Michael Reid MacKay as Rachel Demon
- Kevin Peter Hall as Charon

== Production ==
Shooting took place in 1989 in Arizona, mostly in Phoenix. Parts of the film were also shot at Glen Canyon in Utah.

== Release ==
Hemdale shelved the film for over a year before finally giving it a limited release. It was released to home video on August 21, 1992 and on DVD and Blu-ray on February 2, 2016.

== Reception ==
Kevin Thomas of the Los Angeles Times wrote: "Although ambitious, amusing and even romantic, replete with lots of striking sets and jazzy special effects, its humor is not sophisticated enough to attract the wide audiences of a Beetlejuice". Michael Dare of Billboard called it "smart, witty, and incredibly imaginative". TV Guide rated it 2/5 stars and wrote: "Highway to Hell is no masterpiece, but it is a genuine video find". Todd Rigney of Beyond Hollywood called it a "deliriously enjoyable satanic road trip" film that is "fun if you approach it in the right frame of mind". In 2011 on HorrorNews.Net, Adrian Halen called it "one of the greatest campy horror films to never arrive on DVD", although it subsequently was released on the format in 2016.

Highway to Hell has since developed a cult following.
