= Jennifer Elster =

American filmmaker, writer, and creative entrepreneur

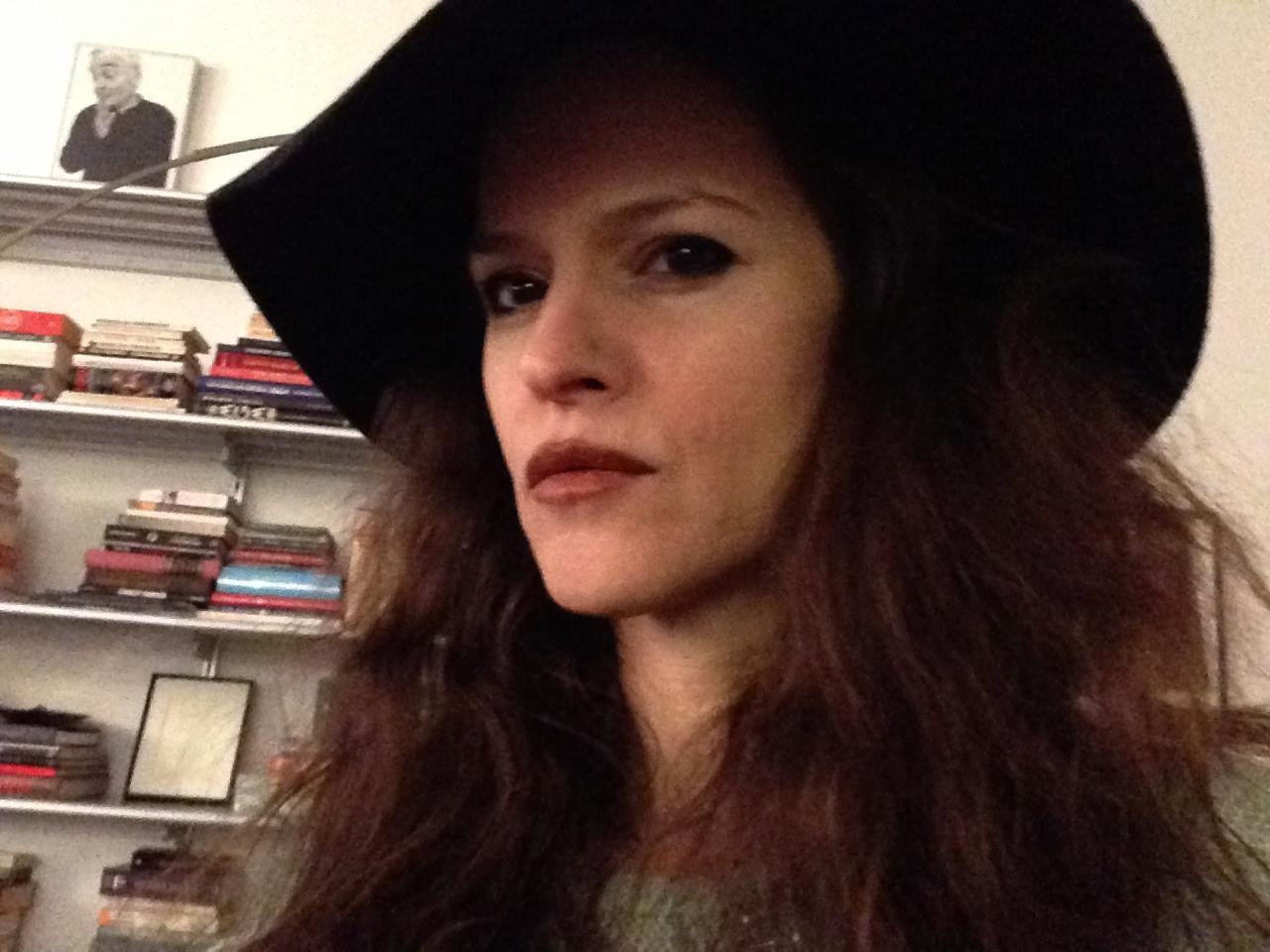
- Born: New York City, New York
- Education: New York University (NYU)
- Occupations: Filmmaker, writer, artist, performer, photographer
- Website: https://www.channelelster.com

Jennifer Elster is an American experimental artist, filmmaker, writer, photographer, musician, and performer. She is the founder of The Development, a film and art studio based in New York City. She is best known for her performance artwork, her solo multidisciplinary exhibitions, The Retrospective of an Extroverted Recluse, and The Wake The F*ck Up Show, as well as her artistic collaborations transforming the late David Bowie into different characters and having written lyrics Yoko Ono performed for the online cinematic excursion Elster helmed entitled ITW Pathway featuring Will Oldham and the late Glenn O'Brien. Elster conceived and directed her upcoming fourteen year film project ...In the Woods (and Elsewhere), which features subjects such as Terrence Howard, Debra Winger, Questlove, Rosie Perez, and Dave Matthews, among others. Elster's performance and video art have been exhibited at the New Museum and Central Booking gallery, in group shows with artists, such as Jonas Mekas and the late Kate Millett, and she has performed at such galleries as Signs and Symbols Gallery, Catinca Tabacaru Gallery, and The Development Underground. Her work focuses on the complexities of humanity and the ongoing fight for social justices. She designs under the J. Elster brand.

== Career ==
Jennifer Elster was born and raised in New York City. She began creating art at an early age as a way to deal with the harshness of reality. Elster obsessively wrote as soon as she was able to write. She created sculptures of people and directed plays and wherever else her imagination took her as a child. As a teenager, she began doing performance dance in the underground art scene at clubs such as The Garage, Tunnel, Fun House, and M.K. She attended New York University, majoring in psychology and writing and graduated with honors. Elster began her career at Conde Nast, working as a fashion assistant at Mademoiselle to subsidize her college tuition. She quickly got promoted to Market Editor and then stylist. She then left to pursue her obsession with writing, but was sought after for her unique aesthetic and ended up styling such artists as the late David Bowie for Outside, Chloë Sevigny, Shirley Manson, Trent Reznor, Isabella Rossellini, and Kate Winslet. Her work has been featured in numerous publications, including covers and stories for Rolling Stone, The Face, Dazed, and Time Magazine.

In the late 90s, she began making experimental films. In 2000 she held her first private art show at the Shooting Gallery, exhibiting a series of stencil canvases and screening an experimental film. Elster made her first short films on shoe-string budgets. Dirty and Ill Will were both shown at the Los Angeles Film Festival in 2001.

A native New Yorker, Elster was greatly affected by 9/11 and cited the experience as "an inevitable influence" on her work and life.

In 2003 Elster's debut feature, Particles of Truth, which she wrote, produced, directed, and starred in, premiered in the Tribeca Film Festival and aired on the Sundance Channel and Netflix. The small-budget indie was described by Variety as "what Hollywood mightily strives for – a believable romantic comedy." Kevin Thomas of the Los Angeles Times called it "an assured and ambitious first film," noting that, "The images of Particles of Truth are so sharp and cut so deep, it's as if its writer-director and co-star Jennifer Elster made them with a scalpel." Eric Campos of Film Threat described the film as "quite an intense emotional rollercoaster with standout performances, especially from Elster."

In 2010, Elster directed The Being Experience: The Prologue as a precursor to her upcoming film series. A diverse group of people participated, including Moby, Temple Grandin and Yoko Ono. Paste Magazine reported of the episodic release: "The delivery will be as unconventional as the experience itself." The Being Experience had been described by Paste as an "eerie psychological ride", while IndieWire notes the unconventional nature of Into the Woods: "Elster's subjects are both literally and figuratively unaware of their path." In 2013 Elster then directed the interactive online experience ITW Pathways, a haunting glimpse into the labyrinth minds of the filmmaker and her subjects, where pathways always recede and no one can really say where it's going other than "…In the Woods". This interactive experience is of parallax depth, pushing the limits of the medium in unexplored directions. These online experiences explore a new way to tell a story and interact within a cinematic experience through pathways that lead to plot twists and interactivity, bringing the audience deeper into the world of "…In the Woods." This online experience was released while in post production of the upcoming film series"... In the Woods (and Elsewhere)", and features artists such as Terrence Howard, Will Oldham, Jørgen Leth, and Famke Janssen. Elster's upcoming film series "...In the Woods (and Elsewhere)" has been fourteen years in the making and will conclude filming in the summer of 2020.

In 2013, Elster expanded her repertoire by founding the J. Elster brand. The New York Times commented on "the beauty of the handmade pieces."

Elster launched ChannelELSTER.com: A Place for Out of the Ordinary Cinema and Sound and opened The Development, a private underground studio and "living installation", in 2016. The Retrospective of an Extroverted Recluse was the first public showing of her work, which was hailed by Michael Tommaseillo of The Huffington Post as "simply magnificent. It dealt with some of my favorite sad topics such as love, love lost, longing, and conflict." The pop-up show featured a multi-disciplinary installation of photography, painting, video, and performances by Jennifer Elster with such musicians as, Trevor Gureckis, Mariko Anruku and Sugar Vendil.

In May 2017, Jennifer Elster performed Amid the Beauty and Cemetery: Is Death? at the New Museum. She also screened her video art titled, Unknown. Elster also performed in shows at West Park, Salon STUX, Catinca Tabacaru Gallery, and The Development Underground.

In 2018, Elster did a solo art exhibition titled "The Wake The F*ck Up Show", featuring a variety of conceptual work, photography, video, performance, paintings and words, that put forth a dialogue for our times in a multimedia exhibition that cut through to the artery to move the American conversation further along.

Elster's political activism can be seen in her protests as well as visual and performative artwork advocating for civil rights and social justice. Additionally she has fought for net neutrality in a written campaign by Elster and Gloria Steinem At a street protest, she stated that she "became incredibly concerned about the way that repealing net neutrality was going to affect the future of our internet freedom...[and that] she had to respond."

== Filmography ==
Year	Film	Credited as					Notes
Year	Film	Director	Screen Writer	Producer	Actor	Role	
2001	Dirty	Yes	Yes	Yes	No	—	
2001	Ill Will	Yes	Yes	Yes	No	—	
2003	Particles of Truth	Yes	Yes	Yes	Yes	Lilli Black	
2005	Life on the Ledge	No	No	Yes	No	—	
2006-2020	In the Woods (The Being Experience)	Yes	No	Yes	No	—	Designed as a multi-part series. Featuring Dave Matthews, Terrence Howard, Moby, Temple Grandin, Famke Janssen.
