= Stephen Marro =

American film producer

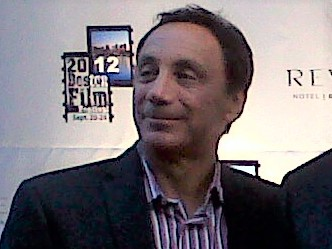
- Morro at the 2012 Boston Film Festival
- Born: Long Beach, New York
- Occupations: Film director, screenwriter, producer
- Years active: 2000 to present

Stephen Marro is a film director, writer, producer based in New York. He is best known for being the producer and director of the 2012 feature film, Broadway's Finest.

== Early life and education ==
Marro grew up in Long Beach, New York and later received his BA in film from New York University.
