= After Sex (2000 film) =

2000 American comedy-drama film

- Theatrical release poster
- Directed by: Cameron Thor
- Written by: Thomas M. Kostigen
- Produced by: Randall Emmett; George Furla
- Starring: Dan Cortese; Virginia Madsen; Brooke Shields; Johnathon Schaech; D. B. Sweeney; Maria Pitillo
- Cinematography: Steve Adcock
- Music by: Amotz Plessner
- Production company: Emmett/Furla Films
- Distributed by: Cutting Edge Entertainment
- Release date: November 27, 2000
- Running time: 96 minutes
- Country: United States
- Language: English

After Sex is a 2000 American comedy-drama film directed by Cameron Thor and starring Dan Cortese, Virginia Madsen and Brooke Shields.

== Plot ==
A group of attractive women get together for a weekend of bonding, hoping to relax and get away from the anxiety of their boyfriends. The women travel out of town, which leads them to picking up men of questionable integrity. The next problem is what they will tell their boyfriends when they get back home.

== Cast ==
- Dan Cortese as John
- Virginia Madsen as Traci
- Brooke Shields as Kate
- Maria Pitillo as Vicki
- Johnathon Schaech as Matt
- D. B. Sweeney as Tony

== Reception ==
Nathan Rabin at The A.V. Club calls the film "a surprisingly glum comedic drama about three couples forced to rethink their commitment to each other after the women enjoy a bonding weekend that degenerates into relationship-threatening debauchery."
