= 2007 in American television =

For American television in 2007, notable events included television show debuts, finales, cancellations, and new channel launches.

== Notable events ==
=== January ===
Date	Event
2	Major American networks cover the state funeral of Gerald Ford.

=== February ===
Date	Event
1	NBC affiliate WNKY in Bowling Green, Kentucky signs-on WNKY-DT2 as a CBS affiliate, giving the Bowling Green market its first locally based CBS affiliate.
13	Singer Julie Roberts appeared in the game show Wheel of Fortune and along with contestant Peter Buccellato, raising $124,250 cash and prizes (including the standard $100,000 grand prize) to her charity for St. Jude's Children's Research Hospital.

=== April ===
Date	Event
1	NBC Nightly News weekend anchor John Seigenthaler retires after 6 years.
11	MSNBC announces its simulcast of radio's Imus in the Morning would be canceled, effective immediately, after public outcry against host Don Imus' derogatory remarks about the Rutgers University women's basketball team. Imus' relationship with his show's radio distributor, CBS Radio, would be terminated later in the spring over the same incident.

=== May ===
Date	Event
1	A cable headend owned by Comcast accidentally replaces an episode of Handy Manny on the Disney Channel with footage of graphic pornography for viewers in Lincroft, New Jersey. The incident is reported to Comcast, which investigates, but no findings are announced to the public.
5	For the first time in 5 years, WNBC, NBC's New York flagship station, revives the "We're 4 New York" campaign after they return for a brief time during 2002 Winter Olympics. The song promos was stopped after the 2008 Summer Olympics in 2008 in the wake of the "Lend America" incident.
23	On Fox, Jordin Sparks wins the 6th season of the popular singing competition American Idol; Blake Lewis is the runner up.
27	ABC's New York flagship station, WABC-TV, is knocked off the air due to a newsroom studio fire that happened minutes before its scheduled 11:00 p.m. newscast. The station briefly returned to carry an ABC West Coast flagship feed and a rebroadcast of ABC World News.

=== June ===
Date	Event
10	The finale of the Television Series, The Sopranos, ends with the episode Made in America, ending with an infamous cut-to-black.
14	Trace Gallagher resigns as anchorman of Fox Report Weekend on the Fox News Channel and is replaced by Laurie Dhue. Studio B Weekend, which was also anchored by Gallagher, has already been pulled from the schedule.
15	83 year-old Bob Barker hosts The Price Is Right for the 6,727th and last time, ending his 35-year tenure on the show and a 50-year run on television. (His last ever Pricing Game was his first: Any Number.) CBS airs Barker's final episode in both its regular daytime slot and in prime time (the latter airing as a lead-in to the 34th Daytime Emmy Awards, at which two of the network's soap operas, Guiding Light and The Young and the Restless, share honors for Outstanding Drama Series).
24	Professional wrestler Chris Benoit murders his wife Nancy and son Daniel before hanging himself to death. His spot in the ECW Championship match against CM Punk at Vengeance: Night of Champions is replaced by Johnny Nitro, who wins the match. WWE cancels Raw the following night and is replaced with a tribute to Benoit.
25	WWE replaces that day's scheduled Raw episode with a 3-hour tribute to Chris Benoit who murdered his wife and son and killed himself the night before.
25	Four Points Media Group assumed operations of seven mid-sized CBS and The CW affiliates previously owned by CBS Corporation through local marketing agreements.
26	In an on-air protest over trivial journalism (specifically MSNBC producers ranking Paris Hilton's release from jail ahead of developments in the Iraq War), newsreader Mika Brzezinski attempts to set fire to a news script, tears up a second, and shreds a third.
26	During installation of a new satellite receiver in Illinois, the Emergency Alert System is accidentally activated at 7:35 AM CDT. An Emergency Action Notification is issued for the United States, followed by dead air. This was played on almost every television and radio station in the Chicago area and throughout large portions of the state. The signal then switched to WGN radio. Garry Meier, then the announcer for WCKG, comes on the air, not knowing what has happened.
26	Before the weekly broadcast of WWE ECW, Vince McMahon announces that Chris Benoit will no longer be mentioned on WWE programming going forward.

=== July ===
Date	Event
6	Adult Swim begins airing on Friday nights, broadcasting daily for the first time, after Cartoon Network ended its Fridays programming block on February 23.
18	Evangelist Tammy Faye Messner makes what would turn out to be her final television appearance as a guest on CNN's Larry King Live. At the time, she said she weighed 65 pounds (29.5 kg) and was unable to eat solid food. Messner's husband, Roe Messner later said that he believed she chose to do the interview to say a final goodbye to her fans. Messner would die two days later after an eleven-year bout with cancer.
23	Drew Carey is announced as the new host of The Price Is Right; his first episode as host aired on October 15.

=== August ===
Date	Event
7	On the premiere episode of the CBS game show Power of 10, contestant Jamie Sadler wins $1,000,000. This was the first time that a contestant won $1,000,000 or more on the first episode of an American game show.
17	The Disney Channel's premiere showing of High School Musical 2 becomes the most-watched made-for-cable movie ever, drawing in 17.24 million viewers. It is followed by a Hannah Montana episode guest starring the Jonas Brothers and the series premiere of Phineas and Ferb.

=== September ===
Date	Event
1	In one of the first football games to air on the Big Ten Network, Appalachian State University upsets the University of Michigan, 34–32, at Michigan Stadium in Ann Arbor, the first time an NCAA Division I FCS school defeats an AP-ranked school from the Bowl subdivision.
7	The soap opera Passions airs for the final time on NBC, only to resurface on September 17 as an exclusive presentation of DirecTV's 101 Network. The cancellation leaves Days of Our Lives as the last remaining soap opera on NBC.
10	Nickelodeon's Nick Jr. block receives a rebrand, containing bumpers encouraging preschoolers to play with Nick Jr., stop-motion logo animations, and no on-screen host for the first time since 1994.
10	The 1999 incarnation of Family Feud surpasses the original incarnation of the show, making it the longest running incarnation of the franchise itself.
15	CBS' Saturday morning cartoon block, KOL Secret Slumber Party, is renamed KEWLopolis.
16	The 59th Primetime Emmy Awards ceremony airs on Fox.
21	Former CBS Evening News anchor, Dan Rather, filed a $70-million lawsuit against CBS News and their parents, Viacom, CBS Corporation, and their executives, Sumner Redstone of National Amusements, Leslie Moonves, CEO of CBS Corporation and Andrew Heyward, former president of CBS News.

=== October ===
Date	Event
1	TBS becomes exclusively a national cable network after WTBS, the Atlanta, Georgia "superstation" from which it was born, becomes an Atlanta-only TV station as WPCH-TV (Peachtree TV).
1	KQET/Watsonville (the satellite of KTEH) switched programming sources from KTEH to KQED.
15	Drew Carey replaces Bob Barker as the new host of The Price Is Right on that day's episode.
22	NBC Nightly News returns to the newly rebuilt Studio 3C at 30 Rockefeller Plaza, and sister network MSNBC's new set in Studio 3A is inaugurated.
28	Game 4 of the World Series is broadcast on Fox. The Boston Red Sox sweep the Colorado Rockies. It was the team's second title since the "breaking the curse" in 2004 and seventh in franchise history.

=== November ===
Date	Event
5	The Writers Guild of America commences a strike against television and movie production studios; the strike lasts until February 2008, but not before production on TV shows are halted and networks' schedules are severely disrupted.
5	Kathleen Herles steps down as the voice of Dora the Explorer after 7 years.
15	Jorja Fox appears for the last time as a regular cast member as investigator Sara Sidle on the CBS drama CSI: Crime Scene Investigation.

=== December ===
Date	Event
3	ESPN's Monday Night Football telecast of the unbeaten New England Patriots and the Baltimore Ravens draws 17.52 million viewers, breaking the basic cable viewership record set earlier in the year by sister network Disney Channel's High School Musical 2.
4	The 2007 Victoria's Secret Fashion Show is broadcast on CBS. 7.4 million people tune in.
23	Ashlee Register wins the $1,720,000 jackpot, along with a banked total of $75,000, for a grand total of $1,795,000 on the ABC game show Duel. She becomes the second female contestant to win $1,000,000 or more on a game show and sets the record for the highest amount of money won on a game show by a woman.
29	After weeks of political pressure (and, to a lesser extent, acknowledging the limited reach of the NFL Network), the National Football League allows that network's broadcast of the game between the New England Patriots and New York Giants to be simulcast nationally on league broadcast partners CBS and NBC. The Patriots would win the game to become the first team in NFL history to go undefeated in a 16-game regular season. (The teams would meet again later in Super Bowl XLII, where the Giants won the NFL title and prevented the Pats from going 19–0.)

== Programs ==
=== Debuts ===
Date	Show	Network
January 1	Engaged and Underage	MTV
January 1	High Maintenance 90210	E!
January 2	Dirt	FX
January 3	In Case of Emergency	ABC
January 3	The Knights of Prosperity	ABC
January 7	Grease: You're the One That I Want!	NBC
January 7	I'm from Rolling Stone	MTV
January 7	Just Jordan	Nickelodeon
January 8	Ego Trip's The (White) Rapper Show	VH1
January 8	I Love New York	VH1
January 8	The Surreal Life: Fame Games	VH1
January 10	Armed & Famous	CBS
January 12	Cory in the House	Disney Channel
January 17	The Naked Trucker and T-Bones Show	Comedy Central
January 17	Maui Fever	MTV
January 20	Bam's Unholy Union	MTV
January 21	The Dresden Files	Sci Fi
January 22	E-Vet Interns	Animal Planet
January 22	The Morning Show with Mike and Juliet	Syndication
January 23	Disney's Really Short Report	Disney Channel
January 24	Dinner: Impossible	Food Network
January 30	Wrestling Society X	MTV
February 1	Juvies	MTV
February 1	The Sarah Silverman Program	Comedy Central
February 3	The Naked Brothers Band	Nickelodeon
February 5	Rules of Engagement	CBS
February 6	New Family	NBC
February 11	Saul of the Mole Men	Adult Swim
February 11	Tim and Eric Awesome Show, Great Job!	Adult Swim
February 12	America's Newsroom	Fox News Channel
February 20	100 Winners	GSN
February 21	Design Squad	PBS Kids Go!
February 23	quiznation	GSN
February 26	Bizarre Foods with Andrew Zimmern	Travel Channel
February 26	The Black Donnellys	NBC
February 26	Power Rangers Operation Overdrive	Jetix (Toon Disney)
February 27	Are You Smarter than a 5th Grader?	Fox
March 2	The Wedding Bells	Fox
March 2	Cities of the Underworld	History
March 3	El Tigre: The Adventures of Manny Rivera	Nickelodeon
March 4	Dice: Undisputed	VH1
March 4	The Winner	Fox
March 5	The Land Before Time	Cartoon Network
March 6	Pussycat Dolls Present	The CW
March 7	IFL Battleground	MyNetworkTV
March 12	The Riches	FX
March 13	Bullrun	Spike
March 13	American Heiress	MyNetworkTV
March 14	Saints & Sinners	MyNetworkTV
March 14	Halfway Home	Comedy Central
March 15	October Road	ABC
March 15	Raines	NBC
March 15	Andy Barker, P.I.	NBC
March 22	This American Life	Showtime
March 23	Acceptable.TV	VH1
March 27	The Great American Dream Vote	ABC
March 29	1,000 Places to See Before You Die	Travel Channel
April 1	Sons of Hollywood	A&E
April 1	The Tudors	Showtime
April 3	Hilary Duff: This Is Now	MTV
April 5	Adventures in Hollyhood	MTV
April 6	Friday Night Premiere Thunder	Cartoon Network
April 7	Human Giant	MTV
April 7	Nick Cannon Presents: Short Circuitz	MTV
April 9	Culture Shock	Travel Channel
April 9	Thank God You're Here	NBC
April 10	Real World/Road Rules Challenge: The Inferno 3	MTV
April 10	Scarred	MTV
April 12	Notes from the Underbelly	ABC
April 13	Painkiller Jane	Sci Fi
April 13	Drive	Fox
April 15	Flavor of Love Girls: Charm School	VH1
April 16	Kate Plus 8	TLC
April 21	The States	History
April 23	The Real Wedding Crashers	NBC
April 25	The Nutshack	Myx
May 7	Roary the Racing Car	PBS Kids Sprout
May 10	Traveler	ABC
May 12	My Friends Tigger & Pooh	Playhouse Disney
May 13	The Drinky Crow Show	Adult Swim
May 13	Fat Guy Stuck in Internet	Adult Swim
May 13	Superjail!	Adult Swim
May 18	National Bingo Night	ABC
May 21	Sprout Sharing Show	PBS Kids Sprout
May 22	On the Lot	Fox
May 25	Storm Hawks	Cartoon Network
May 28	The Ex-Wives Club	ABC
May 30	Hidden Palms	The CW
May 30	The Next Best Thing	ABC
May 31	Pirate Master	CBS
June 3	Army Wives	Lifetime
June 4	Creature Comforts	CBS
June 4	The 5ive	BET
June 6	The X Effect	MTV
June 6	Passport to Latin America	Travel Channel
June 6	Tyler Perry's House of Payne	TBS
June 7	Fast Cars and Superstars: The Gillette Young Guns Celebrity Race	ABC
June 8	Bet the House	Nick at Nite
June 9	Bindi the Jungle Girl	Discovery Kids
June 10	John from Cincinnati	HBO
June 13	Spike Guys' Choice Awards	Spike
June 13	Lil' Bush	Comedy Central
June 17	Flight of the Conchords	HBO
June 17	Ice Road Truckers	History
June 17	Man Caves	DIY Network
June 17	Meadowlands	Showtime
June 18	Age of Love	NBC
June 18	Heartland	TNT
June 22	George of the Jungle	Cartoon Network
June 24	Friday: The Animated Series	MTV2
June 25	Wayside	Nickelodeon
June 26	Shaq's Big Challenge	ABC
June 28	Burn Notice	USA Network
June 29	Iggy Arbuckle	Cartoon Network
June 29	The Best Years	TeenNick
July 2	Camouflage	GSN
July 8	American Body Shop	Comedy Central
July 9	Greek	ABC Family
July 9	Take the Cake	BET
July 10	Baldwin Hills	BET
July 10	The Singing Bee	NBC
July 11	Code Monkeys	G4
July 11	Don't Forget the Lyrics!	Fox
July 12	General Hospital: Night Shift	Soapnet
July 15	Rock of Love with Bret Michaels	VH1
July 16	Victoria Beckham: Coming to America	NBC
July 17	The Bill Engvall Show	TBS
July 17	Just for Laughs Gags	ABC
July 19	Mad Men	AMC
July 20	Set for Life	ABC
July 22	The Kill Point	Spike
July 23	Saving Grace	TNT
July 24	Damages	FX
July 25	Diagnosis X	TLC
July 26	I Hate My 30's	VH1
July 26	Welcome to the Parker	Bravo
August 4	Grand Slam	GSN
August 4	Masters of Science Fiction	ABC
August 5	The Company	TNT
August 6	Fat March	ABC
August 7	LA Ink	TLC
August 7	I-Caught	ABC
August 7	Power of 10	CBS
August 8	The Real World: Sydney	MTV
August 10	Flash Gordon	Sci Fi
August 13	Californication	Showtime
August 13	Newport Harbor: The Real Orange County	MTV
August 13	Slacker Cats	ABC Family
August 17	Phineas and Ferb	Disney Channel
August 20	Star Jones	TruTV
August 20	Yo Gabba Gabba!	Nick Jr.
August 22	Anchorwoman	Fox
August 26	As the Bell Rings	Disney Channel
August 27	Life of Ryan	MTV
August 30	Celebrity Rap Superstar	MTV
August 31	Fried Dynamite	Cartoon Network
August 31	Tak and the Power of Juju	Nickelodeon
September 3	Super Why!	PBS Kids
September 3	WordWorld	PBS Kids
September 3	WordGirl	PBS Kids Go!
September 6	Tim Gunn's Guide to Style	Bravo
September 8	iCarly	Nickelodeon
September 8	Torchwood	BBC America
September 9	Tell Me You Love Me	HBO
September 10	Judge David Young	Syndication
September 10	Merv Griffin's Crosswords	Syndication
September 10	The Selena Gomez Show	Syndication
September 10	The Bridgit Mendler Show	Syndication
September 10	The David & Tamela Show	Syndication
September 10	The Steve Wilkos Show	Syndication
September 10	Temptation	Syndication
September 10	TMZ	Syndication
September 10	The fourth hour of Today	NBC
September 12	Decision House	MyNetworkTV
September 12	Most Daring	TruTV
September 14	Nashville	Fox
September 14	Out of Jimmy's Head	Cartoon Network
September 15	Care Bears: Adventures in Care-a-lot	KEWLopolis
September 15	Sabrina's Secret Life	KEWLopolis
September 17	K-Ville	Fox
September 19	Back to You	Fox
September 19	Kitchen Nightmares	Fox
September 19	Gossip Girl	The CW
September 19	Kid Nation	CBS
September 19	Manswers	Spike
September 22	Eon Kid	Kids' WB
September 22	Skunk Fu!	Kids' WB
September 23	CW Now	The CW
September 23	Online Nation	The CW
September 24	Chuck	NBC
September 24	Journeyman	NBC
September 24	The Big Bang Theory	CBS
September 25	Cane	CBS
September 25	Reaper	The CW
September 26	Bionic Woman	NBC
September 26	Life	NBC
September 26	Dirty Sexy Money	ABC
September 26	Private Practice	ABC
September 27	Big Shots	ABC
September 28	Moonlight	CBS
September 29	Back at the Barnyard	Nickelodeon
October 1	Aliens in America	The CW
October 1	Celebrity Exposé	MyNetworkTV
October 1	Control Room Presents	MyNetworkTV
October 1	Happy Monster Band	Playhouse Disney
October 1	God Rocks: BibleToons	Trinity Broadcasting Network
October 1	Dr. Steve-O	USA Network
October 2	Sunday Best	BET
October 2	Carpoolers	ABC
October 2	Cavemen	ABC
October 3	Pushing Daisies	ABC
October 4	Last One Standing	Discovery Channel
October 5	About a Girl	TeenNick
October 6	Cash Explosion	Syndication
October 7	America's Most Smartest Model	VH1
October 7	Edgar & Ellen	Nicktoons
October 7	Life Is Wild	The CW
October 9	A Shot at Love with Tila Tequila	MTV
October 12	Say Yes to the Dress	TLC
October 12	Wizards of Waverly Place	Disney Channel
October 12	Women's Murder Club	ABC
October 13	The Future Is Wild	Discovery Family
October 13	The Search for the Next Elvira	Fox Reality Channel
October 14	Keeping Up with the Kardashians	E!
October 15	Fox Business Morning	Fox Business Network
October 15	Money for Breakfast	Fox Business Network
October 15	The Salt-N-Pepa Show	VH1
October 15	Samantha Who?	ABC
October 17	Storm Chasers	Discovery Channel
October 18	Viva Laughlin	CBS
October 19	The Next Great American Band	Fox
October 22	Kaya	MTV
October 24	Phenomenon	NBC
October 31	MonsterQuest	History
November 2	Chowder	Cartoon Network
November 2	Orangutan Island	Animal Planet
November 3	DinoSquad	KEWLopolis
November 3	Sushi Pack	KEWLopolis
November 4	Xavier: Renegade Angel	Adult Swim
November 5	America's Pulse with E.D. Hill	Fox News Channel
November 5	Happening Now	Fox News Channel
November 10	Bunnytown	Playhouse Disney
December 12	Crowned: The Mother of All Pageants	The CW
December 17	Duel	ABC
December 17	Clash of the Choirs	NBC
December 26	Transformers: Animated	Cartoon Network

=== Returning this year ===
Show	Previous network	Last aired	New network	Returning
King of the Hill	Fox	2006	Same	January 28
Ed, Edd n Eddy	Cartoon Network	2006	Same	April 16
Unfabulous	Nickelodeon	2006	Same	August 10
Cash Explosion	Ohio syndication	2006	Same	October 6

=== Ending this year ===
Date	Show	Channel	Debut	Status
January 5	The Megan Mullally Show	Syndication	2006	Cancelled
January 8	Engineering an Empire	History	2005	Cancelled
January 23	Jakers! The Adventures of Piggley Winks	PBS Kids	2003	Cancelled
January 24	Armed & Famous	CBS	2007	Cancelled
January 25	The Center	BET	2003	Cancelled
January 30	Big Day	ABC	2006	Cancelled
February 2	Campus Ladies	Oxygen	2006	Cancelled
February 2	Masters of Horror	Showtime	2005	Cancelled
February 9	MXC	TNN/Spike	2003	Cancelled
February 10	Catscratch	Nickelodeon	2005	Cancelled
February 12	High Maintenance 90210	E!	2007	Cancelled
February 14	JoJo's Circus	Playhouse Disney	2003	Cancelled
February 18	Reba	The CW	2001	Cancelled
February 22	The O.C.	Fox	2003	Ended
February 23	Nanny 911 (returned in 2009)	Fox	2004	Cancelled
February 26	Ego Trip's The (White) Rapper Show	VH1	2007	Cancelled
February 28	The Greg Behrendt Show	Syndication	2006	Cancelled
February 28	Justice	Fox	2006	Cancelled
March 1	Cartoon Alley	Turner Classic Movies	2004	Cancelled
March 4	What's with Andy?	Fox Kids	2001	Cancelled
March 5	The Class	CBS	2006	Cancelled
March 6	Watch Over Me	MyNetworkTV	2006	Cancelled
March 6	Wicked Wicked Games	MyNetworkTV	2006	Cancelled
March 7	Maui Fever	MTV	2007	Cancelled
March 14	Wrestling Society X	MTV	2007	Cancelled
March 18	I'm From Rolling Stone	MTV	2007	Cancelled
March 18	The Winner	Fox	2007	Cancelled
March 22	Juvies	MTV	2007	Cancelled
March 25	Grease: You're the One That I Want!	NBC	2007	Cancelled
March 25	The Surreal Life: Fame Games	VH1	2007	Cancelled
March 25	The George Michael Sports Machine	Syndication	1980	Cancelled
March 25	Rome	HBO	2005	Cancelled
March 26	What About Brian	ABC	2006	Cancelled
March 27	Two-A-Days	MTV	2006	Cancelled
March 27	Austin Stevens: Snakemaster (returned in 2009)	Discovery Channel	2004	Cancelled
March 28	The Great American Dream Vote	ABC	2007	Cancelled
March 29	Blue's Room	Nick Jr.	2004	Cancelled
March 30	Celebrity Deathmatch	MTV2	1998	Cancelled
March 30	Crank Yankers (returned in 2019)	MTV2	2002	Cancelled
March 30	Falcon Beach	ABC Family	2006	Cancelled
March 30	Six Degrees	ABC	2006	Cancelled
April 1	Connie the Cow	Noggin	2006	Cancelled
April 1	Miffy and Friends	Noggin	2003	Cancelled
April 1	Perfect Hair Forever (returned in 2014)	Adult Swim	2004	Cancelled
April 1	Dice: Undisputed	VH1	2007	Cancelled
April 2	The Black Donnellys	NBC	2007	Cancelled
April 3	Bam's Unholy Union	MTV	2007	Cancelled
April 6	The Wedding Bells	Fox	2007	Cancelled
April 6	Cinematech	G4	2002	Cancelled
April 9	The Life and Times of Juniper Lee	Cartoon Network	2005	Cancelled
April 9	Hilary Duff: This Is Now	MTV	2007	Cancelled
April 11	In Case of Emergency	ABC	2007	Cancelled
April 13	It Takes a Thief	Discovery Channel	2005	Cancelled
April 14	Andy Barker, P.I.	NBC	2007	Cancelled
April 15	The Dresden Files	Sci Fi Channel	2007	Cancelled
April 20	My GamesFever	Fox-owned MyNetworkTV stations	2006	Cancelled
April 22	The War at Home	Fox	2005	Cancelled
April 23	Drive	Fox	2007	Cancelled
April 23	Adventures in Hollyhood	MTV/MTV2	2007	Cancelled
April 27	Raines	NBC	2006	Cancelled
April 27	Identity	NBC	2006	Cancelled
April 29	Sons of Hollywood	A&E	2007	Cancelled
May 1	The Andy Milonakis Show	MTV2	2005	Cancelled
May 3	Trading Spouses	Fox	2004	Cancelled
May 4	Cold Pizza	ESPN2	2003	Cancelled
May 5	Loonatics Unleashed	The CW	2005	Cancelled
May 8	George Lopez	ABC	2002	Cancelled
May 9	Road Rules	MTV	1995	Cancelled
May 11	Acceptable.TV	VH1	2007	Cancelled
May 11	Close to Home	CBS	2005	Cancelled
May 13	7th Heaven	The CW	1996	Cancelled
May 14	All of Us	The CW	2003	Cancelled
May 14	The King of Queens	CBS	1998	Ended
May 14	Thank God You're Here	NBC	2007	Cancelled
May 15	Gilmore Girls	The CW	2000	Ended
May 16	12 oz. Mouse (returned in 2020)	Adult Swim	2005	Cancelled
May 16	Crossing Jordan	NBC	2001	Cancelled
May 16	Halfway Home	Comedy Central	2007	Cancelled
May 22	Veronica Mars (returned in 2019)	The CW	2004	Cancelled
May 25	Hotwyred	BET	2006	Cancelled
May 25	Shorty McShorts' Shorts	Disney Channel	2006	Cancelled
May 28	The Real Wedding Crashers	NBC	2007	Cancelled
May 29	Punk'd (returned in 2012)	MTV	2003	Cancelled
June 8	Ned's Declassified School Survival Guide	Nickelodeon	2004	Cancelled
June 9	Chain Reaction (returned in 2015)	GSN	1980	Cancelled
June 9	Pimp My Ride	MTV	2004	Cancelled
June 10	The Sopranos	HBO	1999	Ended
June 13	100 Winners	GSN	2007	Cancelled
June 16	Make Way for Noddy	PBS Kids	2002	Cancelled
June 18	Creature Comforts	CBS	2007	Cancelled
June 21	The Showbiz Show with David Spade	Comedy Central	2005	Cancelled
June 22	Stargate SG-1	Sci Fi Channel	1997	Cancelled
June 22	National Bingo Night	ABC	2007	Cancelled
June 25	The Ex-Wives Club	ABC	2007	Cancelled
June 28	Studio 60 on the Sunset Strip	NBC	2006	Cancelled
June 29	Lingo (returned in 2011)	GSN	1987	Cancelled
June 29	Free Stuff	G4	2007	Cancelled
July 1	The Loop	Fox	2006	Cancelled
July 3	The Most Extreme	Animal Planet	2002	Cancelled
July 4	Hidden Palms	The CW	2007	Cancelled
July 5	Short Circuitz	MTV	2007	Cancelled
July 8	Friday: The Animated Series	MTV2	2007	Cancelled
July 15	Saul of the Mole Men	Adult Swim	2007	Cancelled
July 16	Extreme Makeover	ABC	2002	Cancelled
July 17	Pirate Master	CBS	2007	Cancelled
July 18	American Heiress	MyNetworkTV	2007	Cancelled
July 18	Saints & Sinners	MyNetworkTV	2007	Cancelled
July 18	Traveler	ABC	2007	Cancelled
July 20	Standoff	Fox	2006	Cancelled
July 22	Harvey Birdman, Attorney at Law (returned in 2018)	Adult Swim	2000	Cancelled
July 25	The Next Best Thing	ABC	2007	Cancelled
July 26	Hey Paula	Bravo	2007	Cancelled
July 27	Camouflage	GSN	2007	Cancelled
July 31	Shaq's Big Challenge	ABC	2007	Cancelled
July 31	Blowin' Up	MTV	2006	Cancelled
August 5	The Simple Life	E!	2003	Cancelled
August 6	Age of Love	NBC	2007	Cancelled
August 7	Meadowlands	Showtime	2007	Cancelled
August 7	Morning Call	CNBC	2002	Cancelled
August 11	Kidnapped	NBC	2006	Cancelled
August 12	John from Cincinnati	HBO	2007	Cancelled
August 19	The Company	TNT	2007	Cancelled
August 21	On the Lot	Fox	2007	Cancelled
August 22	Anchorwoman	Fox	2007	Cancelled
August 23	The Knights of Prosperity	ABC	2007	Cancelled
August 24	Friday Night Premiere Thunder	Cartoon Network	2007	Cancelled
August 24	Danny Phantom	Nickelodeon	2004	Cancelled
August 25	Flight 29 Down	Discovery Kids	2005	Cancelled
August 25	Masters of Science Fiction	ABC	2007	Cancelled
August 26	The Kill Point	Spike TV	2007	Cancelled
August 30	Welcome to the Parker	Bravo	2007	Cancelled
August 31	Heartland	TNT	2007	Cancelled
September 1	American Dragon: Jake Long	Disney Channel	2005	Cancelled
September 2	Play with Me Sesame	Noggin	2002	Cancelled
September 4	The Crocodile Hunter	Animal Planet	1996	Cancelled
September 7	Kim Possible	Disney Channel	2002	Cancelled
September 8	Dance Revolution	CBS	2006	Cancelled
September 8	Grand Slam	GSN	2007	Cancelled
September 13	I Hate My 30's	VH1	2007	Cancelled
September 16	The Dead Zone	USA Network	2002	Cancelled
September 16	The 4400	USA Network	2004	Cancelled
September 16	Drake & Josh	Nickelodeon	2004	Ended
September 17	American Body Shop	Comedy Central	2007	Cancelled
September 17	Slacker Cats	ABC Family	2007	Cancelled
September 18	Scarred	MTV	2007	Cancelled
September 20	Dallas SWAT	A&E	2006	Cancelled
September 21	Nashville	Fox	2007	Cancelled
September 21	Painkiller Jane	Sci-Fi Channel	2007	Cancelled
September 23	The 1/2 Hour News Hour	Fox News Channel	2007	Cancelled
September 27	American Hot Rod	TLC/Discovery Channel	2004	Cancelled
September 27	Squirrel Boy	Cartoon Network	2006	Cancelled
September 29	Make Me Famous, Make Me Rich	Syndication	2006	Cancelled
September 30	Braves TBS Baseball	TBS	1975	Cancelled
October 7	American Princess	We TV	2005	Cancelled
October 9	I Wanna Be a Soap Star	SOAPnet	2004	Cancelled
October 10	Maya & Miguel	PBS Kids Go!	2004	Cancelled
October 14	Fox Online	Fox News Channel	2006	Cancelled
October 14	Online Nation	The CW	2007	Cancelled
October 14	Mystery!	PBS	1980	Cancelled
October 18	Celebrity Rap Superstar	MTV	2007	Cancelled
October 20	Fantastic Four: World's Greatest Heroes	Nicktoons	2006	Cancelled
October 21	Hogan Knows Best	VH1	2005	Cancelled
October 21	Viva Laughlin	CBS	2007	Cancelled
October 29	BBQ with Bobby Flay	Food Network	2004	Cancelled
October 30	Queer Eye	Bravo	2003	Cancelled
October 31	Quiznation	GSN	2007	Cancelled
October 31	PlayMania	GSN	2006	Cancelled
November 2	Take the Cake	BET	2007	Cancelled
November 9	A Haunting (returned in 2012)	Discovery Channel	2002	Cancelled
November 9	The Grim Adventures of Billy & Mandy	Cartoon Network	2003	Cancelled
November 10	Code Lyoko	Cartoon Network	2003	Cancelled
November 10	That's So Raven	Disney Channel	2003	Ended
November 11	Lucy, the Daughter of the Devil	Adult Swim	2005	Cancelled
November 11	Tell Me You Love Me	HBO	2007	Cancelled
November 12	Dr. Steve-O	USA Network	2007	Cancelled
November 13	Cavemen	ABC	2007	Cancelled
November 14	Drawn Together	Comedy Central	2004	Cancelled
November 17	The Doodlebops	Playhouse Disney	2005	Cancelled
November 21	Phenomenon	NBC	2007	Cancelled
November 28	Bionic Woman	NBC	2007	Cancelled
November 28	Gerald McBoing-Boing	Cartoon Network	2005	Cancelled
November 30	The 5ive	BET	2007	Cancelled
December 12	Kid Nation	CBS	2007	Cancelled
December 14	Notorious	The Biography Channel	2004	Cancelled
December 15	Kaya	MTV	2007	Cancelled
December 15	Whose Line Is It Anyway? (returned in 2013)	ABC Family	1998	Cancelled
December 16	Unfabulous	Nickelodeon	2004	Cancelled
December 16	America's Most Smartest Model	VH1	2007	Cancelled
December 17	K-Ville	Fox	2007	Cancelled
December 18	Cane	CBS	2007	Cancelled
December 19	Journeyman	NBC	2007	Cancelled
December 20	Clash of the Choirs	NBC	2007	Cancelled
December 21	The Next Great American Band	Fox	2007	Cancelled
December 23	A Shot at Love with Tila Tequila	MTV	2007	Cancelled
December 27	Yo Momma	MTV	2006	Cancelled
December 30	Shorts in a Bunch	Nicktoons	2007	Cancelled

=== Shows changing networks ===
Show	Moved from	Moved to
American Chopper	Discovery Channel	TLC
Crank Yankers	Comedy Central	MTV2
Kenny vs. Spenny	GSN	Comedy Central
Law & Order: Criminal Intent	NBC	USA Network
Passions	NBC	The 101
Tim Russert	CNBC	MSNBC
Imus in the Morning	MSNBC	RFD-TV
Strawberry Shortcake	Syndication	CBS
Play with Me Sesame	Noggin	PBS Kids Sprout
NFL Films Game of the Week	NFL Network	Ion Television

=== Entering syndication this year ===
Show	Seasons	In production	Notes	Source
Cold Case	4	Yes		
Degrassi: The Next Generation	6	Yes	Two episodes weekly	
Family Guy	5	Yes		
George Lopez	5	No		
Grey's Anatomy	3	Yes	Cable syndication on Lifetime	
Half & Half	4	No		
Law & Order: Criminal Intent	6	Yes		
The Office	3	Yes	Cable syndication on TBS	
Reno 911!	4	Yes		
Two and a Half Men	4	Yes		

== Networks and services ==
=== Network launches ===
Network	Type	Launch date	Notes	Source
CaribeVision	Cable television	Unknown		
qubo	Over-the-air multicast	January 8		
Netflix	OTT streaming	January 16		
Ion Life	Over-the-air multicast	February 19		
myxTV	Cable and satellite	February 28		
Chiller	Cable and satellite	March 1	NBC Universal launches Chiller, the first US cable/satellite channel devoted to horror programming.	
LATV	Cable television	April 23		
German Kino Plus	Cable television	May 4		
TuVision	Cable television	July 1		
KET ED: The Education Channel	Over-the-air multicast and local cable (Kentucky)	August	Created as a merger of KET3 and KET4, KET ED provides instructional television programming tailor-made for schools and libraries, operating with the same duties as the service's predecessors KET Star Channels 703 and 704.	
Discovery Familia	Cable and satellite	August 9		
Big Ten Network	Cable and satellite	August 30	The Big Ten Network formally launches, but its debut is marred by its failure to reach carriage agreements with Comcast, Time Warner Cable, Charter Communications, and several other smaller providers serving the conference's geographical footprint. The dispute goes unsolved for nearly a year, causing viewers to miss several games seen in previous years via local syndication, public broadcasting stations connected to universities, and ESPN's family of networks.	
Minnesota Channel	Cable television	September 16		
Smithsonian Channel	Cable and satellite	September 26		
NHL Network	Cable and satellite	October 1		
Fox Business	Cable and satellite	October 15		
Hulu	OTT Streaming	October 29		
Penthouse TV	Cable and satellite	December		
Retro Jams	Cable television	December		

=== Conversions and rebrandings ===
Old network name	New network name	Conversion date	Type	Notes	Source
i: Independent Television	ION Television	Over-the-air multicast	January 29		

=== Closures ===
Network	Type	Closure date	Notes	Source
MTV Chi	Cable television	April 30		
The Tube Music Network	Cable television	October 1		
Nickelodeon Games and Sports for Kids	Cable television	December 31	Nick GAS shuts down (although it remains on Dish Network until April 23, 2009, when it is replaced by the west coast feed of Cartoon Network) and is replaced by a 24-hour version of Noggin's teen-targeted block, The N.	

== Television stations ==
=== Station launches ===
Date	City of License/Market	Station	Channel	Affiliation	Notes/Ref.
January	Alexandria, Louisiana	KALB-DT2	5.2	CBS	
January	Alexandria/Nashville, Tennessee	WKRP-LP	6	White Springs Television	
January 12	Crockett, Texas	KTWC-LD	12	TBN	
February 1	Bowling Green, Kentucky	WNKY-DT2	40.2	CBS	
March	Casper, Wyoming	KPTW	6	PBS	Part of the Wyoming PBS network
March 5	Harrisonburg, Virginia	WHSV-DT3	3.3	ABC	
March 16	Lubbock, Texas	KMYL-LP	14	MyNetworkTV	
March 24	Columbus, Ohio	WCSN-LD		Independent	
June 5	Hammond/New Orleans, Louisiana	WHMM-DT	42	Telemundo	
June 13	Redding, California	K58IF	58	Azteca America	
July 31	Knoxville, Tennessee	W45DF-D	45	HSN	
August 21	Los Angeles, California	KBBC-TV	20	Spanish independent	
September 11	Saranac Lake/Plattsburgh, New York	WCWF	40	Ion Television	
September 13	Charlottesville, Virginia	WVIR-DT3	29.3	The CW Plus	
September 27	Burlington, Vermont/Plattsburgh, New York	WFFF-DT2	44.2	The CW	
September 30	Hannibal, Missouri (Quincy, Illinois/Keokuk, Iowa)	KHQA-DT2	7.2	ABC	
October	El Centro, California	KVFA-LP	6	Independent	
October 1	Marquette, Michigan	WLUC-DT2	6.2	The Tube Music Network	NBC Weather Plus
Unknown date	Cheyenne, Wyoming	KKTU-LP	40	ABC	
Unknown date	Ogden, Utah	KULX-LP	10	Telemundo	
Unknown date	Springfield, Massachusetts	WWLP-DT2	22.2	Independent	24-hour local weather channel until 2015
Unknown date	Terre Haute, Indiana	WTHI-DT2	10.2	Independent	24-hour local weather channel until 2015
Unknown date	Wheeling, West Virginia (Steubenville, Ohio)	WTRF-DT2	7.2	Fox	

=== Network affiliation changes ===
Date	City of License/Market	Station	Channel	Old affiliation	New affiliation	Notes/Ref.
September 13	Charlottesville, Virginia	WVIR-DT2	29.2	The CW Plus	NBC Weather Plus	CW+ moves to DT3 subchannel
July	Marquette, Michigan	WBKP		ABC	The CW	
October 1	Marquette, Michigan	WLUC-DT2	6.2	The Tube Music Network	NBC Weather Plus	
November 9	Hagåtña, Guam (Agana)	K28HS	28	TBN	NBC	Became an LPTV translator of KUAM-TV
November 9	Hagåtña, Guam (Agana)	K30HB	30	TBN	NBC	Became an LPTV translator of KUAM-TV
November 9	Hagåtña, Guam (Agana)	K32GB	32	TBN	NBC	Became an LPTV translator of KUAM-TV
November 9	Hagåtña, Guam (Agana)	K36GJ	36	TBN	NBC	Became an LPTV translator of KUAM-TV
Unknown date	Rehoboth Beach, Delaware (Dover, Delaware/Salisbury, Maryland)	WRDE-LP	59	America One	Retro Television Network (primary); MyNetworkTV (secondary)	

=== Station closures ===
Date	City of license/Market	Station	Channel	Affiliation	Sign-on date	Notes
February 8	Florence, Alabama	WYLE	26	Jewelry Television; Shop at Home Network	April 19, 1986	

== Births ==
Date	Name	Notability
January 19	Jackson Dollinger	Actor (Sydney to the Max)
January 19	Lidya Jewett	Actress (WITS Academy)
January 24	Peyton Z. Basnight	Actress (Saturdays)
January 28	That Girl Lay Lay	Actress (That Girl Lay Lay)
January 31	Tex Hammond	Actor (Lincoln Loud on The Loud House (Episode 114 onwards))
February 23	Leah Mei Gold	Actress (The Casagrandes, Pretty Freekin Scary)
February 28	Scarlet Spencer	Actress (Cousins for Life)
March 4	Miya Cech	Actress (Are You Afraid of the Dark?, The Astronauts)
March 6	Lili Brennan	Actress (Drama Club)
March 10	Malachi Barton	Actor (Stuck in the Middle, Fancy Nancy)
March 25	Will Buie Jr	Actor (Bunk'd)
March 28	Luke Roessler	Actor
April 3	Ava Madison Gray	Voice Actress (Cocomelon)
April 20	Terrence Little Gardenhigh	Actor (Danger Force)
April 21	Bryan Blanco	Actor (Ultra Violet & Black Scorpion)
May 1	Artyon Celestine	Actor (Drama Club)
May 21	Keith L. Williams	Actor (The Astronauts)
June 6	Aubrey Anderson-Emmons	Actress (Modern Family)
June 14	Lyon Daniels	Actor (The Spiderwick Chronicles)
July 17	Callan Farris	Actor (Gabby Duran and the Unsittables)
July 24	Elie Samouhi	Actor (Bizaardvark)
July 28	Danielle Jalade	Actress (Saturdays)
July 31	Angelica Hale	Singer (America's Got Talent)
August 16	Seth Carr	Actor (Knight Squad)
August 22	Raphael Alejandro	Actor (Bunk'd)
August 24	Noah Cottrell	Actor (Punky Brewster)
August 27	Ariana Greenblatt	Actress (Stuck in the Middle)
August 28	August Maturo	Actor (Girl Meets World)
August 31	Jason Maybaum	Actor (Raven's Home, Blue Bloods)
September 9	Mitchell Berg	Actor (Side Hustle)
September 25	Zelia Ankrum	Actress (Ultra Violet & Black Scorpion)
October 16	Kaylin Hayman	Actress (The Mick, Just Roll with It)
November 8	Micah Abbey	Actor (Cousins for Life)
November 20	Havan Flores	Actress (Danger Force)
November 30	Kayden Grace Swan	Actress (The Astronauts)
December 4	Scarlett Estevez	Actress (Bunk'd, Ultra Violet & Black Scorpion)
December 21	Daria Johns	Actress (The Upshaws, Saturdays)
December 26	Christian J. Simon	Voice actor (Darwin on The Amazing World of Gumball (2018–present), Sydney to the Max)

== Deaths ==
Date	Name	Age	Notability
January 8	Yvonne De Carlo	84	Actress (Lily Munster on The Munsters)
January 14	Darlene Conley	72	Actress (The Bold and the Beautiful)
January 16	Benny Parsons	65	Race car driver, TV announcer / analyst
January 22	Doug Blasdell	44	Personal trainer (Work Out)
January 30	Sidney Sheldon	89	Writer, creator (I Dream of Jeannie)
January 31	Lee Bergere	88	Actor (Dynasty)
February 8	Anna Nicole Smith	39	Model and actress (The Anna Nicole Show)
April 5	Mark St. John	51	Singer (Kiss)
April 7	Barry Nelson	89	Actor (James Bond on Climax!)
April 11	Roscoe Lee Browne	81	Actor (voice of Kingpin on Spider-Man)
May 7	Nicholas Worth	69	Actor
May 15	Jerry Falwell	73	Pastor, televangelist
May 25	Charles Nelson Reilly	76	Actor and game show panelist (The Match Game)
May 27	Gretchen Wyler	75	Actress
June 12	Don Herbert	89	Creator and host of Watch Mr. Wizard
June 21	Carlos Romero	80	Actor
June 24	Chris Benoit	40	Professional wrestler and star of ECW (WWE)
July 11	Lady Bird Johnson	94	First Lady of the United States and spouse of President Lyndon B. Johnson
July 29	Tom Snyder	71	Talk show host (Tomorrow Show)
August 28	Miyoshi Umeki	78	Japanese actress (The Courtship of Eddie's Father)
August 29	Richard Jewell	44	Man falsely accused of the Centennial Olympic Park bombing by the press
September 10	Jane Wyman	90	Actress (Falcon Crest)
September 21	Alice Ghostley	84	Actress, singer (Bewitched, Mayberry R.F.D., Designing Women)
November 14	Ronnie Burns	72	Actor (The George Burns and Gracie Allen Show)
