= Junkrat =

Fictional video game character

- Overwatch character
- Junkrat's appearance in Overwatch
- First game: Overwatch (2016)
- Designed by: Arnold Tsang; Ben Zhang, David Kang (equipment)
- Voiced by: Chris Parson

In-universe information
- Class: Damage
- Nationality: Australian

Junkrat is the alias of Jamison Fawkes, a character who first appeared in the 2016 video game Overwatch, a Blizzard Entertainment–developed first-person hero shooter, and the resulting franchise. Junkrat is an insane man obsessed with explosives, living in an irradiated Australia. After finding a valuable secret, he becomes a target for various groups and forms a partnership with the character Roadhog. The two engage in a crime spree, but later come into conflict with the city Junkertown and its ruler, Junker Queen.

Junkrat was well received upon debut, seen as a humorous madman character in the vein of those such as comic book villains the Joker or the Green Goblin. His gameplay has received similar praise, particularly for how well critics feel it suits his overall personality. Junkrat has been seen as a positive example of disability representation in video games due to his prosthetic limbs, though at the same time has received some criticism for Blizzard's cultural and a perceived reliance on stereotypes.

== Conception and development ==
During the development of the game Overwatch, Junkrat's original concept was conceived by Blizzard as a means to balance the character Torbjörn's turrets. In addition, they wanted to create a character that could serve as an indirect damage dealer, able to bounce explosives off of walls and "cause chaos in battle". Designed by artist Arnold Tsang, several concepts were considered including a cyborg, designs that looked "more alien than human", and a round robot, the last of which would later be recycled as a basis for the character Wrecking Ball. As work progressed, they found themselves gravitating towards a design of a man in a bomb suit with a large grenade launcher, inspired by the bomb disposal suit seen in the film The Hurt Locker.

However this caused a problem as the developers wanted to be able to see the character's face and his maniacal expressions, so the concept was scrapped and started over. One early concept to this end featured a large mustached man with cargo pants and a cape. Tsang suggested to have the character missing limbs to portray him as reckless. As the design coalesced, they initially considered to have him be a member of "Los Muertos", a Mexican gang in the Overwatch universe, but instead chose the "Junkers", a group of scavengers in Australia taking inspiration from the Mad Max film franchise. While Tsang developed Junkrat himself, his weapons were designed by artists Ben Zhang and David Kang. Establishing Junkrat's background also helped the team finalize another planned character, Roadhog, who had also been designed by Tsang early on. The writing team chose to make the two partners in crime, with lead writer Michael Chu describing the pair as "not exactly your common superheroes".

=== Design ===
Standing 6 feet 6 inches (195 cm) tall, Junkrat is a tall white man with a lean muscular build, blonde singed hair with matching thick eyebrows, and yellow eyes. His right arm is replaced at the elbow with an orange cybernetic prosthetic, while his left leg is replaced at the hip with a kneed peg leg with a suspension spring. His outfit consists of a solitary black boot and bandages on his left leg, a harness over his bare chest with various grenades, and yellow shorts with various patches including a large yellow smiley face stitched on the right leg. His left hand has a fingerless glove with a large bracelet at the wrist, while a canteen and satchel rest on his waist on the right-hand side. Meanwhile, his body is covered in soot, particularly the upper part of his head, and a skull tattoo is visible on his right upper arm.

Like other Overwatch characters, Junkrat received skins, unlockable cosmetic items to change his in-game appearance. When developing them, the team had to account for all his various weapons as well to ensure they fit the skin's particular theme. They also aimed to "honor the core fantasy" of the character and be consistent with his personality as an "unpredictable madman who leaves a trail of destruction in his wake." His "King Jamison" skin was designed to reference his many heists across the world, but also included items from another Blizzard game, Hearthstone, and a sword and shield based on awards given to Blizzard employees to celebrate five and ten years of service within the company. Meanwhile, his "Clown" skin drew responses from Twitter users referring to it as sexually appealing; when asked about it, the Overwatch social media account on Twitter stated "it's a genuinely terrifying clown skin for our favourite explosive Australian. You know *someone* is into it, statistically."

In Overwatch 2, Junkrat's pants were changed to a solid red pattern, and he now wears less body armor. His design was left mostly unchanged save for his "RIP-Tire" weapon, which saw a significant visual overhaul.

== Appearances ==
Junkrat, real name Jamison Fawkes, is an Australian scavenger, mercenary and anarchist introduced in the 2016 first person hero shooter Overwatch. In the game's setting, Australia is a radioactive wasteland, populated by human scavengers who call themselves Junkers. Junkrat is one, but was driven insane due to the radiation and became obsessed with explosives. After discovering a valuable secret he became the target of bounty hunters, gangs, and opportunists. He enlists the help of Roadhog, who agrees to be his bodyguard for half of whatever profits they make, and the two engage on a crime spree. They later bring the loot to the settlement of Junkertown to try and get re-entry and revenge against its ruler, Junker Queen, but the plan fails. In other games, Junkrat appears as a playable hero in Heroes of the Storm. In all appearances, he is voiced by Chris Parson.

In literary works, Junkrat and Roadhog appear in the comic Wasted Land, which details how they met prior to their exile from Junkertown. The duo are later featured in the short story "A Friendly Rivalry" by Justin Groot, Gavin Jurgens Fyhrie, and Miranda Moyer, set after the events of the game's "Zero Hour" storyline. In it, they are sentenced to be executed by Junker Queen for crimes against her settlement, in which they need to fight her champion, Wrecking Ball. When Junkrat offers to lead her to a hidden treasure to save their lives, she accepts, and he leads her to a hidden chamber. While the story does not say what they find, Junker Queen asks Wrecking Ball if he "can get it flying".

=== Gameplay ===
In Overwatch, Junkrat is classified as a Damage-class character, designed to provide a more offensive role in team compositions. He was originally classified as a Defense-class character before it and the Offense-class were combined into one classification. He carries a "Frag Launcher" that fires grenades that explode after a period of time. He additionally has a passive ability, "Total Mayhem", which drops grenades at his location after he has been killed.

Junkrat also has several abilities that require activation, though each has a "cooldown" period after use and are unable to be used again during that duration. These include "Steel Traps", which creates a bear trap on the ground that will temporarily immobilize opponents that trigger it, and remote-detonated "Concussion Mines" that damages enemies, and can launch him upward if he is in the blast radius. Lastly, his 'ultimate' ability, called "RIP-Tire", requires to be charged before use. The ability charges slowly during the course of gameplay, and can be charged faster through damage dealt to the enemy team. Once full the ability can be activated to fire a self-propelled truck wheel loaded with explosives that he's able to manually steer and detonate.

For Heroes of the Storm, most of his abilities remained unchanged. However, he gained an alternative option to RIP-Tire called "Rocket Ride", which when activated will have him spawn and ride a large customized rocket into the sky before crashing down on a targeted area. While this will kill Junkrat, once he respawns after a shorter duration than normal he will be able to use the rocket as a mount for a brief time to travel with increased movement speed.

== Promotion and reception ==
To promote Overwatch and the character, Blizzard Entertainment released a cosplay guide and promotional images themed around holidays. A Lego set featuring both Junkrat and Roadhog was also released. Other merchandise includes apparel by clothing company Jinx, a nendoroid produced by Good Smile, and several figures by Funko Pop, including a two-figure set with Roadhog and a standalone figure modeled after his Halloween Terror event appearance.

Junkrat has been popular since his debut. His character design has been the subject of cosplay, while engineer Colin Furze created a functional replica of his RIP-Tire weapon. Meanwhile, Matt Owens, a writer for the Agents of S.H.I.E.L.D. television series, based aspects of the character Hellfire off of Junkrat, having him quote several of Junkrat's lines and share traits with the latter, such as ethnicity and a similar name. Chris Moyse of Destructoid stated he was always amused by Blizzard's depiction of the character in how he was often used for comic relief, "but he's also pretty much a cut-throat murderer, who'd blow up your mum for three bucks". Moyse compared him to DC Comics' Joker or Marvel Comics' Green Goblin in this manner, feeling that Junkrat's charisma "doofus" personality belied that he was a very dangerous individual. The Daily Dot's Joseph Knoop meanwhile praised the destructive nature of the character's gameplay in contrast to others, and argued that some of the character's appeal arose not from his background as an insane Australian, but that "we all see a little bit of Junkrat in ourselves".

Clayton Purdom of Kill Screen praised how Junkrat's gameplay "rewards cowardice", enjoying how it rewarded the use of ambush tactics and hit and run behavior. Comparing it to gameplay found in the Halo video game series, he enjoyed being able to stay away from the main conflict and be able to engage from afar, finding such a novel concept for a first person shooter. Purdom also praised the character's "less savory" aspects, noting that while Overwatch had been praised for embracing diversity while maintaining cohesion amongst the cast, Junkrat's "Batman-villain malevolence" helped him stand out. Acknowledging that the character's destructive attitude did not strike a comedic tone with him, Junkrat's vocal disdain for certain levels in the game and how badly he wanted to demolish them provided "just the sort of ludonarrative consonance we don't celebrate enough", providing moments he felt Overwatch otherwise handled poorly with its cast.

Journalist Nathan Grayson expressed similar views in an article for Kotaku, stating that while he originally found the character a blight on the game, after using him he came to understand the appeal. In particular, he enjoyed how Junkrat's mechanics not only encouraged players to be "so crafty and conniving". He found the character's maniacal laughter and personality also played well into this aspect, portraying him as someone having "the time of their life" and further calling him the "Gollum of the Overwatch universe" due to how deceptively easy pickings his hunched stature made him appear to other players. In contrast, fellow Kotaku writer Cecilia D'Anastasio wrote an article refuting Grayson's claims, suggesting that instead the character was counterintuitive to the design of a game like Overwatch as he was "antagonistic to team coordination". As his main damage source utilizes a constant stream of grenades, he became harder to fight against, and felt to D'Anastasio like a character that encouraged "mindless" gameplay in contrast to its more strategic aspects.

Regarding representation in gaming, non-profit organization AbleGamers praised him as a positive example of disability due to the loss of his leg, noting that while it changed the manner in which he navigated the world it did not define his identity, and further emphasized "a narrative of capability and resilience". Kat Seifert in the book Science MashUp: XR–Gesellschaft–Utopien: Leipziger Beiträge zur Computerspielekultur examined Junkrat's in-game animations, and praised how they not only conveyed his disability but also his personality through elements such as his weapon reload animation. She felt that these elements helped illustrate to the viewer not only his character, but also helped emphasize Overwatch's character design diversity. In contrast however, University of Murcia researcher Juan Francisco Belmonte in a paper for the 2017 DiGRA conference argued that Junkrat's insanity and dirt-covered features coupled with Roadhog's animalistic features presented them as "a departure from what 'white' represents" for other characters in the game and an example of how he perceived Blizzard relying on stereotypes when designing Overwatch and representing the cast's cultural backgrounds.
