= Roadhog (Overwatch) =

Overwatch character

- Overwatch character
- Roadhog's appearance in Overwatch
- First game: Overwatch (2016)
- Designed by: Arnold Tsang; Ben Zhang (weapon)
- Voiced by: Josh Petersdorf

In-universe information
- Class: Tank
- Nationality: Australian

Roadhog is the alias of Mako Rutledge, a character who first appeared in the 2016 video game Overwatch, a Blizzard Entertainment–developed first-person hero shooter, and the resulting franchise.

== Conception and design ==
While working on a massively multiplayer online game concept for Blizzard Entertainment, developer Geoff Goodman suggested the idea of a large number of character classes for players to select, with class specialization for each. Fellow developer Jeff Kaplan took this idea to heart, and over time developed a project codenamed Prometheus, which would later become the game Overwatch. Designed by artist Arnold Tsang, Roadhog was one of the characters included in the original pitch image for the project, and went through multiple redesigns. Initial concepts featured the character with a mutated appearance caused by radiation, prominently the presence of a pig like face and snout with the rear edges of the mouth stapled together.

After the character Junkrat was developed, they were able to finalize Roadhog's design. Now giving him a more-human appearance with a pig-like gas mask, they utilized themes inspired from the Mad Max films. The writing team chose to make the two partners in crime, with lead writer Michael Chu describing the pair as "not exactly your common superheroes". They were particularly excited by the inclusion of the pair as unlike other characters introduced at the game's release that did not have ties to the titular Overwatch organization, and thus gave them new opportunities to "try something new".

=== Design ===
Roadhog stands 7 feet 3 inches (230 cm) tall, and is an obese Australian man with greyed hair tied into a ponytail atop his head, dirt on his skin, and a pig-themed engine tattoo on his stomach that reads "Wild Hog Power", with his protruding navel forming the pig's snout. His outfit consists of unbuckled camouflage overalls with a knee pad on his right leg featuring a skull decoration, steel toe boots with the left toe protruding in a spike, and shoulder pads over his upper torso. The right shoulder has a spiked tire pauldron with a yellow armor piece. Both forearms have wraps around them, with the hand covered by a spiked fingerless glove with wrist guard, while he wears rings on his left hand. Roadhog wears a license plate as a belt buckle, with the text reading "ROADR8GE".

Like other Overwatch characters, Roadhog received skins, unlockable cosmetic items to change his in-game appearance. His "Toa" skin in particular references Polynesian Māori culture and replicates a tribal outfit. The skin changes Roadhog's tattoos to match this theme, and referenced a cultural tattoo artist to not only ensure authenticity of them but also the correct number of feathers a warrior of that culture should wear in their headdress. Meanwhile, his "Pachimarchi" skin was developed to highlight Roadhog's love for the squid-like onion plushies introduced in his introductory cinematic. Designed to help promote the related pachimari merchandise in the Blizzard online store, both the skin and plush were designed by David Kang, who described them as a mascot for Overwatch similar to Warcraft's murlocs.

== Appearances ==
Mako Rutledge lived in the Australian Outback in the period after the Omnic Crisis. The government of Australia, in an effort to make peace with the omnics, allowed them to take possession of the omnium and the territory around it, displacing the human residents. Mako and other angry humans formed the Australian Liberation Front (ALF) to strike against the omnium and the omnics that resided around it. In the end, the ALF overloaded the fusion core, destroying the omnium and turning the Outback into a radioactive wasteland, severely disfiguring Mako's face. Mako donned a mask and took to the broken highways on his chopper, forsaking his humanity little by little until he became a ruthless killer. He then joined up with Junkrat as his bodyguard, in exchange for half of whatever treasure the ex-Junker knew the location of. After the two were exiled from Junkertown by the Junker Queen for causing a string of problems for her, Roadhog and Junkrat decided to get back at her. They embarked on an international crime spree and became wanted criminals in many countries. Once their worldwide heist was complete, they returned to Junkertown with their loot to use to get back at the Junker Queen, but Junkrat blew their cover at the entrance, leaving them with nothing but a cart of goods, useless disguises, and a ticking explosive.

In literary works, Roadhog is featured in the short story A Friendly Rivalry by Justin Groot, Gavin Jurgens Fyhrie, and Miranda Moyer, set after the events of the game's "Zero Hour" storyline. In it, he and Junkrat were sentenced to be executed by Junker Queen for crimes against her settlement, and were required to fight her champion, Wrecking Ball. When Junkrat offered to lead her to a hidden treasure to save their lives, she accepted, and he led her to a hidden chamber. While the story does not say what they found, Junker Queen asked Wrecking Ball if he could "get it flying".

=== Gameplay ===
He wields a "Scrap Gun" that fires shrapnel in a mid-range automatic firing mode, or a short-range shotgun-like single shot. He also carries an NOS canister filled with "Hogdrogen" to self-heal ("Take a Breather"), and employs a "Chain Hook" to pull distant opponents towards him. His ultimate ability, "Whole Hog", allows him to put a top loader into his scrap gun, firing it in full auto mode with increased knockback, wider spread, and no need to reload. Within a November 2023 patch to Overwatch 2, Roadhog's kit was modified slightly to address some of the incohesiveness of the original kit. The Scrap Gun was made into a single firing mode that has both a short-range shotgun burst in addition to mid-range projectiles. Take a Breather was changed to be a resource-based healing mode, allowing the player to use as much stored Hogdrogen to heal Roadhog, along with a shorter cooldown period. Finally, a new second ability, "Pig Pen", was added, allowing Roadhog to lay down a trap that can slow and damage enemies that cross it, including those pulled in by Roadhog's Chain Hook.

== Promotion and reception ==
To promote Overwatch and the character, Blizzard Entertainment released a cosplay guide and promotional images themed around holidays. A Lego set featuring both Junkrat and Roadhog was also released. Other merchandise includes apparel by clothing company Jinx, as well as several figures by Funko Pop, including a two-figure set with Junkrat and a standalone figure modeled after his Halloween Terror event appearance.

Roadhog was well received upon debut. The Daily Dot's Joseph Knoop stated that despite the development team's various tweaks to his gameplay, "Roadhog's hulking form is still the epitome of tank play." Cecilia D'Anastasio of Kotaku described him as a "wheezing, porcine tank from Hell", calling him her favorite character introduced in 2016 and expressing her appreciation for all his character aspects, while observing how fans tried to explore his character's past and his relationship with Junkrat. Gareth Damian Martin in an article for Kill Screen felt that an ode to the character was an ode to ugliness which permeated through Roadhog's design and behavior. He added that in comparison to the more athletic and attractive characters of Overwatch's cast, "Roadhog's abjection is near Shakespearean", feeling in this manner he reflected Shakespeare's character Falstaff as well as French writer François Rabelais's characters Gargantua and Pantagruel.

Carlos Zotomayor of Game Rant in an examination of his character felt of the Overwatch cast Roadhog had the most zen mindset, brought about by the frequent loss the character had experienced including his former identity. He felt this portrayed in part by his responses to threats and his surroundings, particularly in contrast to Junkrat's more excited reaction, and helped illustrate a reserved personality and one uninterested in the conflict around him. Zotomayor also felt that many of his character animations reflected this aspect, showing that while he was slow his movements were measured, and even his attack movements reflected precision while still being deft and weighty. He closed by stating that while many see the character as "a soulless, selfish criminal", Roadhog "knows exactly who he is and what he wants out of life."

Dr. Felipe Antônio de Souza in a dissertation for the Federal University of Santa Catarina examined the characters of Overwatch through the scope of social semiotics. In regards to Roadhog, he felt that the character was intentionally created to be a mysterious, with his word usage often being subtle and led one to question why he behaved the way he did or was a criminal in the first place. In addition, he felt the character was presented as an introvert, and through this aspect alongside others served as a perfect contrast to Junkrat.

=== Cultural anlaysis ===
Blizzard received accusations of cultural appropriation for his "Toa" and "Islander" skins due to referencing imagery from Maori culture. D'Anastasio in another article for Kotaku pointed out while the character was commonly assumed to be from Australia due to his association with Junkrat, he used slang common to New Zealand, where the Maori originate. She additionally pointed out his name Mako references the Maori word for shark, and that his tattoos on the skins were the "spitting image" of those particular to the culture one could see via Google search results. de Souza in his own study pointed out many aspects of the skin reflected Maori culture, particularly Roadhog's use of a hook weapon and the authenticity of the skin's tattoos.

However, Shahryar Rizvi in an article for Kill Screen argued that while the skins appeared to take inspiration from Polynesian cultures, it was hard to tell which cultures they borrowed from due to the similarities between the groups. Particularly he noted the Toa skin's mask while stylized to resemble a pig appeared more in line with Tiki culture, and seemed to reflect stereotypes of Polynesian culture that derived from post-World War II Tiki bars. In this way, these elements seemed to strengthen the argument that the design constituted cultural appropriation.

=== Regarding stereotyping ===
Meanwhile, University of Baltimore associate professor Todd Harper wrote an article on his blog voiced heavy disdain for the character. Harper, who had previously discussed character stereotypes to avoid for with overweight characters at the Game Developers Conference, felt that Roadhog flew in the face of many of these concerns particularly with the emphasis of his protruding stomach. While he acknowledged that visual storytelling was important, he felt that the design emphasized his body as being "strange" or "weird", and served as visual shorthand of "being gross". Harper additionally drew issue with the character's pig theme, and felt it played in part with his use of Hogdrogen which felt too similar to the a stereotype of obese characters in video games eating to regain health. He ultimately complained the design was lazy, stating there was "no ingenuity, no cleverness, no subtlety, no parody or satire, here; just a fat man whose entire visual schtick is to draw attention to how fat he is".

The response from fans of the character however caused Harper to reexamine his stance. In an interview with Bryant Francis for the website Game Developer, Harper stated while he personally disliked Roadhog's design, other players took inspiration from the fantasy of having raw, overwhelming power. He expressed this served as a paradox on how one could approach the subject, and that "no one choice is ever going to fill everyone's needs". In a later paper for the Journal of Electronic Gaming and Esports, Harper acknowledged that while many of the responses of praise for the character were more specific for certain individuals, the reasons they found him empowering and enjoyable were perfectly valid, and led to him reconsidering his views towards other similar characters in gaming through that scope. In another article for his blog, he also observed that while some fans treated the character as a joke, others focused on portraying a humanness of his character and as a person, and stated that it was just as important to him to see such characters treated as human beings than just a cardboard standup of tropes.
