= Us Again =

Us Again may refer to:

- "Us Again" (song)
- Us Again (film)
