= Chuck Wicks =

American singer-songwriter (born 1979)

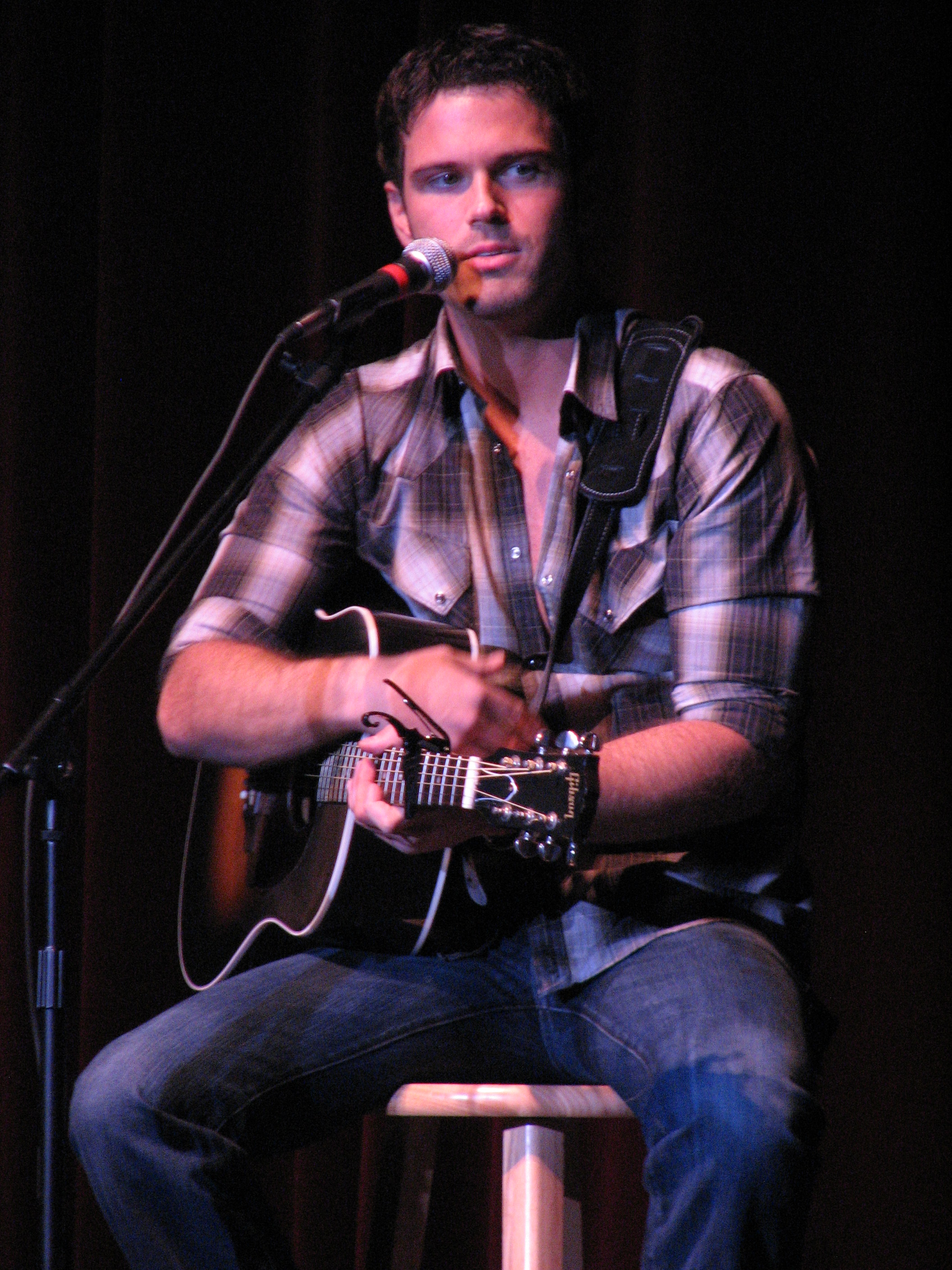
- Wicks in concert, December 2008

Background information
- Born: Charles Elliott Wicks; June 20, 1979 (age 47)
- Origin: Smyrna, Delaware, U.S.
- Genre: Country
- Occupations: Singer-songwriter, radio personality
- Instrument: Vocals
- Years active: 2007–present
- Labels: RCA Nashville, CO5, Blaster
- Website: ChuckWicks.com

Charles Elliott Wicks (born June 20, 1979) is an American country music artist and radio personality. He was one of the participants on the American reality series Nashville, which aired on Fox for two episodes before its cancellation in mid-2007. In late 2007, he signed to RCA Records Nashville as a recording artist, with his debut single "Stealing Cinderella" being released in September of that year. It served as the lead-off to his debut album Starting Now, which was released in January 2008. "All I Ever Wanted" and "Man of the House" were released as the album's second and third singles, respectively, and both have charted in the Top 40 as well.

== Personal life ==
Chuck Wicks was born in the community of Smyrna, Delaware, where he was raised on a potato farm. He is the son of Debbie (Elliott) and John Wicks. In January 2009, his charity concert in his hometown of Smyrna raised $25,000 for the Smyrna-Clayton Boys and Girls Club.

In August 2008, Wicks began dating fellow country singer Julianne Hough, who is a professional dancer and two-time champion on Dancing with the Stars. Wicks and Hough competed as a couple on the eighth season of Dancing with the Stars. Their first performance took place on March 9, 2009, and he was eliminated from the show on April 28. They announced a mutual break-up on November 10, 2009.

In 2018 he announced he is dating Kasi Williams Morstad, the sister of country music singer Jason Aldean. The couple got engaged in March 2019. The couple married on July 12, 2019, in Mexico. On December 4, 2020, they welcomed their first child, a son. Wicks also has three stepdaughters from Morstad's previous marriages.

== Music career ==
Wanting to pursue a career in country music, he moved to Nashville, Tennessee after quitting college two classes short of graduation from Florida Southern College. He then began to hone his songwriting skills, penning more than one hundred songs per year at one point, and one of his songs, "Lead Me On", was recorded by Steve Holy on his 2006 album Brand New Girlfriend. Eventually, Wicks caught the attention of RCA Records executives, who signed him to a recording contract in late 2007. While he was working on his debut album, Wicks was also picked as a cast member of the Fox network reality TV series Nashville. Due to poor ratings, however, Nashville was canceled after its second episode.

=== Debut album: Starting Now (2007–2009) ===
RCA then released Wicks's debut single, "Stealing Cinderella", which he co-wrote with George Teren and Rivers Rutherford. He debuted the song at his first Grand Ole Opry appearance in August 2007. Shortly after the song's release, University of Tennessee football coach Phillip Fulmer heard it. Fulmer said the song "hit [him] like a ton of bricks," so he contacted Wicks, arranging a private performance at his daughter Courtney's wedding.

The single produced the biggest debut for any new country artist in all of 2007, with fifty-two of the stations on Billboard's survey adding it in its first official week of airplay. It was also the fastest-climbing debut country single in 2007, reaching a peak of number 5 on the country charts in January, and 56 on the Billboard Hot 100. The song was included on Wicks' debut album Starting Now, which was released on January 22, 2008 and peaked at 7 on the Top Country Albums charts. Wicks co-wrote all but one of the album's tracks. "All I Ever Wanted" was released in April 2008 as the album's second single, and peaked at 14 by the end of the year. A third single, "Man of the House", followed in January 2009, entering Top 40 in February, and peaked at 27.

=== 2010–present ===
On November 10, 2009, Wicks announced that he has started to work on his second album. The album's first single, "Hold That Thought," was released on May 17, 2010, and debuted at number 55 on the Hot Country Songs chart for the chart week of June 5, 2010. It was followed by "Old School", which made number 51 on the same chart before Wicks exited the label in January 2011. The song remained on the charts after Wicks' departure from the label, and CO5 Music began promoting it in late January 2011.

In the midst of preparing to release a new record, Wicks wrote a song titled, "I Don't Do Lonely Well", which got his future brother-in-law Jason Aldean's attention and landed him a spot on his then upcoming album Night Train in 2012. Being a fan himself, Wicks was very excited and said that it was a big deal to him that Aldean cut one of his songs to include on his highly anticipated 5th record, which was released on October 6, the same year.

Wicks self-released an extended play titled Rough in April 2013. He co-wrote its first single, "Salt Life", with Vicky McGehee and Mike Mobley, and co-produced the extended play with Ilya Toshinsky.

In December 2013, Wicks confirmed that he had signed with Blaster Records. His debut release for the label is "Us Again", which became his first Top 40 country single since "Man of the House" in 2009. It peaked at number 37 on the Billboard Country Airplay chart in May 2014. "Saturday Afternoon" was the second single issued to country radio in September 2014, but did not chart. Wicks' first album for Blaster, Turning Point, was released on February 26, 2016.

Wicks currently co-hosts America's Morning Show on Nash FM with Ty Bentli and Kelly Ford.

== Discography ==
=== Studio albums ===
Title	Album details	Peak chart positions		
Title	Album details	US Country	US	US Indie
Starting Now	Release date: January 22, 2008; Label: RCA Nashville; Formats: CD, music download	7	24	—
Turning Point	Release date: February 26, 2016; Label: Blaster Records; Formats: CD, music download	12	167	12
"—" denotes releases that did not chart

=== Extended plays ===
Title	Album details	Peak chart positions		
Title	Album details	US Country	US	US Indie
Rough	Release date: April 9, 2013; Label: Self-released; Format: Music download	21	70	16

=== Singles ===
Year	Single	Peak chart positions				Certifications	Album
Year	Single	US Country	US Country Airplay	US	CAN	Certifications	Album
2007	"Stealing Cinderella"	5		56	81	RIAA: Gold	Starting Now
2008	"All I Ever Wanted"	14		86	—		Starting Now
2009	"Man of the House"	27		—	—		Starting Now
2010	"Hold That Thought"	42		—	—		—N/a
2010	"Old School"	43		—	—		—N/a
2013	"Salt Life"	—	—	—	—		Turning Point
2014	"Us Again"	36	37	—	—		Turning Point
"—" denotes releases that did not chart

=== Music videos ===
Year	Video	Director
2007	"Stealing Cinderella"	Kristin Barlowe
2008	"All I Ever Wanted"	Kristin Barlowe
2010	"Hold That Thought"	Kristin Barlowe
2011	"Old School"	Marcel
2013	"Salt Life"	Marcel
