= Leah de Niese =

Australian actress

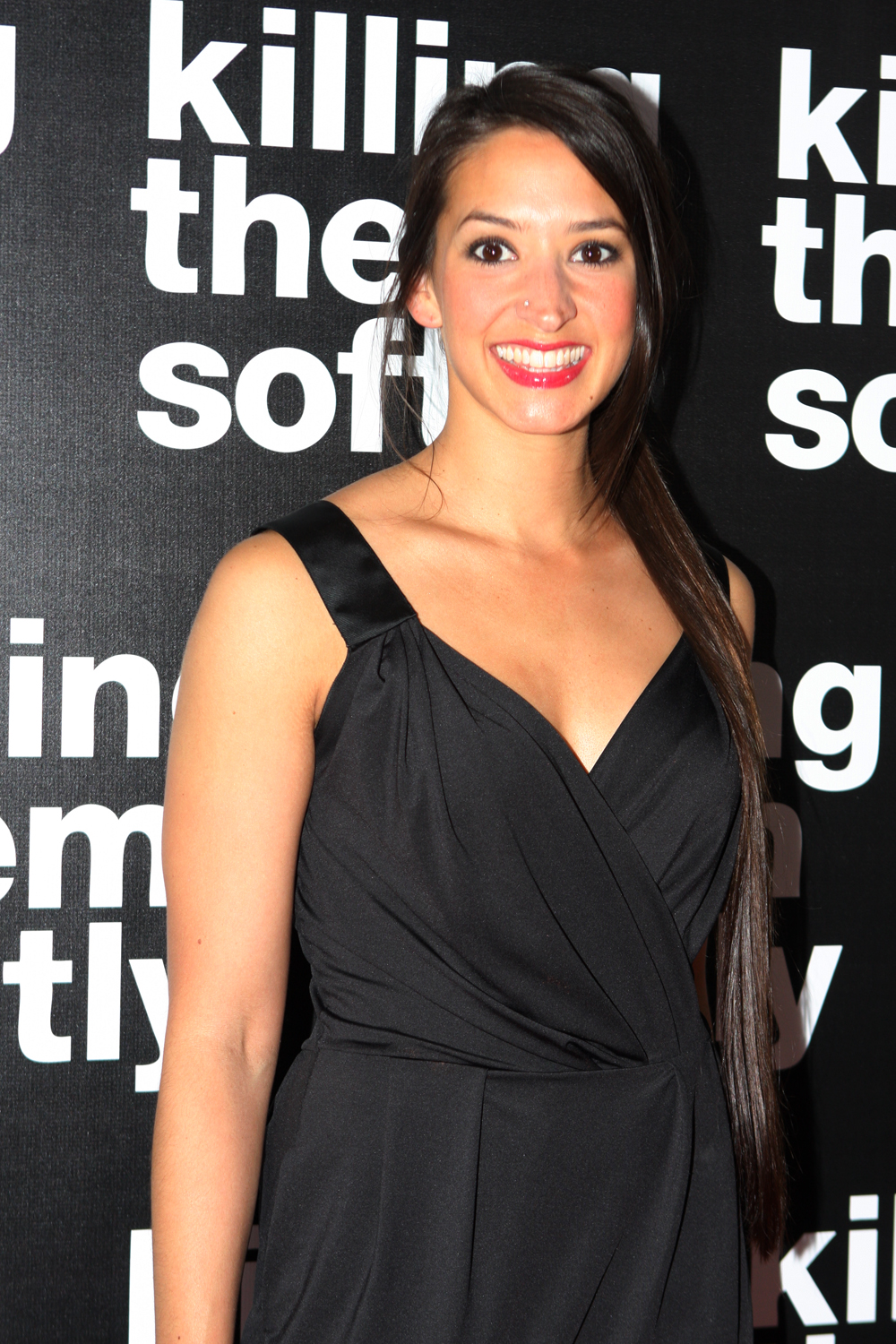
- de Niese in 2012
- Born: Melbourne, Australia
- Occupation: Actress
- Years active: 1991–present

Leah de Niese is an Australian-Sri Lankan actress. She began her acting career on stage when she seven years old, before securing a recurring role in the Australian soap opera, Neighbours when she was eleven. de Niese made guest appearances in Blue Heelers and Stingers, before appearing in Neighbours for a second time in 2001. She played Ruth Hartnell in the children's television series, Short Cuts and made her feature film debut in the Australian comedy film, Hating Alison Ashley (2005). She joined the supporting cast of Offspring in 2010, before joining the main cast of comedy series, Twentysomething as Abby. From 2012 until 2013, she played Nicola Panas in the Channel 9 drama series, House Husbands. In 2022, de Niese took on her first voice acting role when she was cast as the Junker Queen in the Overwatch 2 video game. de Niese voices Astoria Durand in the 2023 sci-fi adventure VR game, Journey to Foundation.

== Early life ==
de Niese is from Melbourne, Australia. Her father, Alan de Niese, presents Wednesday Night at the Opera on the Melbourne radio station 3MBS. Her grandparents were well known duettists in the choral communities in both Sri Lanka and Australia. de Niese attended Deakin University. She began acting when she was seven, appearing as part of the ensemble for a production of The Wizard of Oz at the State Theatre in January 1991.

== Career ==
When she was eleven years old, de Niese made her first screen appearance in the recurring role of Miranda Starvaggi in the soap opera, Neighbours. She followed this with guest appearances in dramas, Blue Heelers and Stingers. In 2001, she made a second appearance in Neighbours as Larissa Calwell, who becomes involved in a love triangle with best friends, Paul McClain (Jansen Spencer) and Tad Reeves (Jonathon Dutton). Following this, de Niese appeared in all 26 episodes of the children's television series, Short Cuts as Ruth Hartnell.

de Niese made her feature film debut in the 2005 Australian comedy film, Hating Alison Ashley as Chrystal. She was then cast in the independent feature film, Court of Lonely Royals (2006). In 2010, de Niese joined the supporting cast of Offspring as Jimmy's (Richard Davies) girlfriend, Odile. She followed this with a regular role in the ABC2 comedy series, Twentysomething as Abby.

In 2012, de Niese appeared in the Australian comedy film, 10 Terrorists. That same year, she began starring in the Channel 9 drama, House Husbands as Nicola Panas, a mother of three young children who is estranged from her husband Justin Baynie (played by Firass Dirani). de Niese appeared in two seasons until her character was killed off in 2013 to allow writers to focus on Justin's journey as a single father. Her exit was not announced prior to the episode airing in order to surprise viewers. de Niese was informed that she was being written out at the end of 2012 during a meeting with producers. She admitted that she thought her character would not be around for long, as producers would likely want to keep Dirani's character single. She added "I'm just sorry for Justin and Nicola because they were in such a love bubble and this happens. I'm really proud of our work together."

In 2017, de Niese starred in an episode of the horror anthology web-series, Scary Endings. A few years later, she auditioned for her first voice acting job with Blizzard Entertainment. de Niese filmed her audition like she would for a film or TV role, unaware that she did not have to be on camera for a voice audition. After receiving a number of callbacks, de Niese was cast as the Junker Queen in Overwatch 2. The Junker Queen is a native to The Wasteland, which is the remains of the Australian outback after a robot uprising and subsequent war, and she rules over Junkertown. de Niese helped to develop the Junker Queen's personality and characterisation. She gave suggestions on how to make the character an authentic Australian, commenting, "Being able to shift the language to reflect Australian-isms was really important and they were very welcoming of that."

In 2023, de Niese voiced the headstrong Astoria Durand in Archiact's sci-fi adventure VR game, Journey to Foundation. She also voiced the character, Priya in the animated television series, 100% Wolf: Book of Hath.

== Acting credits ==
Television and film performances
Year	Title	Role	Notes
1994–1995	Neighbours	Miranda Starvaggi	Recurring
1995	Janus	Evie	Episode: "An Unnatural Act"
2001	Neighbours	Larissa Calwell	Recurring
2002	Blue Heelers	Kimberley Dyson	Episode: "Say His Name"
2002	Short Cuts	Ruth Hartnell	Main cast
2004	Noah & Saskia	Toya	Episode: "Don't Give Me No Love Song Blues"
2004	Stingers	Jemma Dyson	Episode: "Dirty Little Secrets"
2005	Hating Alison Ashley	Chrystal	Feature film
2006	Court of Lonely Royals	Camille XXXX	Feature film
2010–2011	Offspring	Odile	Recurring
2011–2013	Twentysomething	Abby	Main cast
2012	10 Terrorists	Cat	Feature film
2012	Puberty Blues	Celia	Episodes #1.3, #1.4
2012–2013	House Husbands	Nicola Panas	Main cast
2017	Scary Endings	Riley	Episode: "There's Something Out There"
2020	Perfect Chaos	Deedee	Episode 10

Voice-over performances
Year	Title	Role	Notes
2022	Overwatch Shorts	Odessa "Dez" Stone	Episode: "The Wastelander"
2022	Overwatch 2	Junker Queen	Video game
2023	Journey to Foundation	Astoria Durand	Video game
2023	100% Wolf: Book of Hath	Priya	TV series
