= Chris Parson =

American voice actor

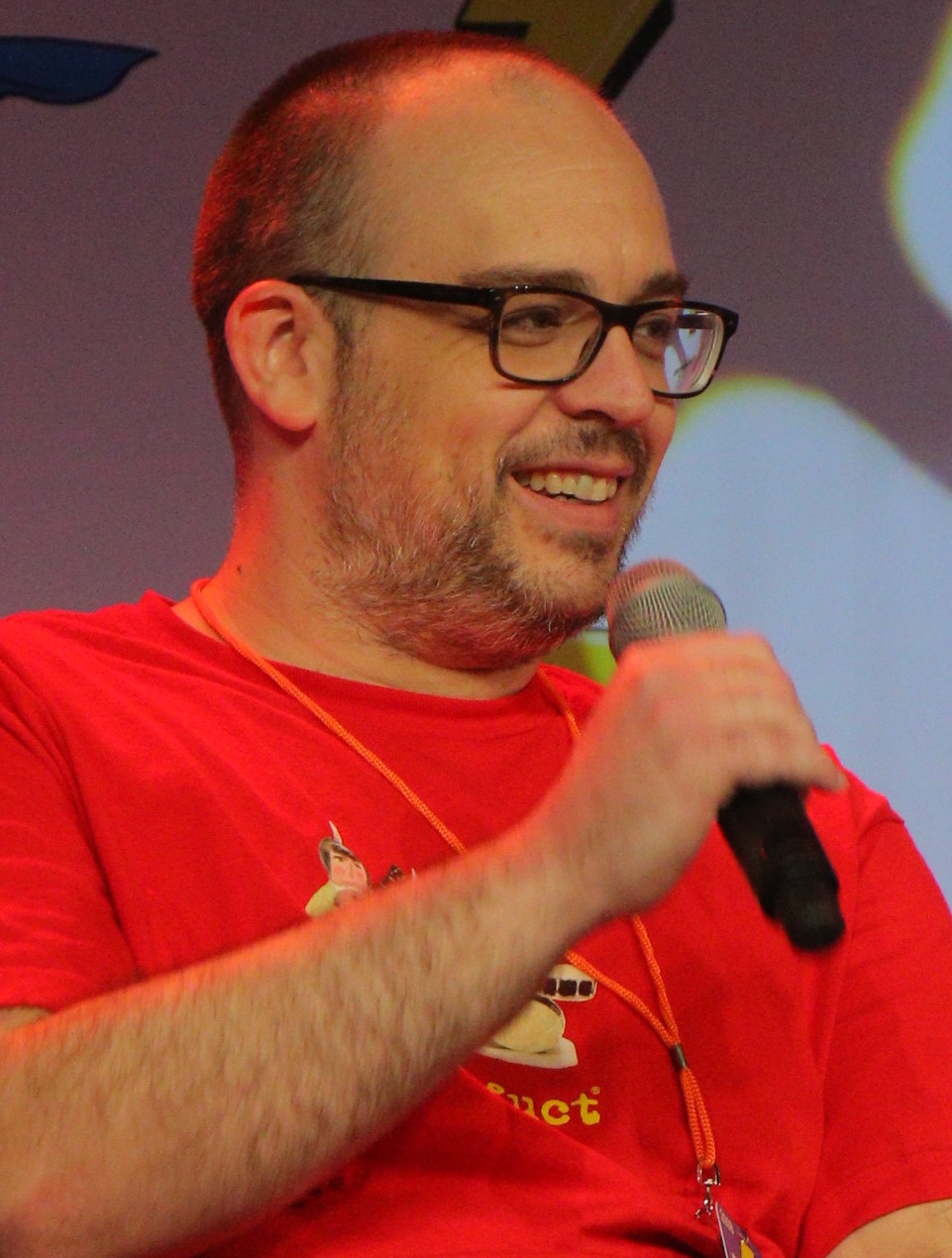
- Parson at Florida SuperCon in 2018
- Born: Christopher L. Parson
- Occupation: Voice actor
- Years active: 2000–present
- Website: gochrisparson.com

Christopher L. Parson is an American voice actor and a 2001 graduate of the USC School of Cinema Television (now USC School of Cinematic Arts). Parson began his career working primarily as an assistant in talent management while still a student, and worked briefly in digital artist management for Sony Pictures Imageworks.

It was after being laid-off from Sony that Parson decided to pursue a career in voiceover, one he entered after responding to a classified ad on the popular website Craigslist.

He subsequently appeared as the narrator in several documentaries, appearing on The Fifth Element special edition DVD and The Pursuit of Happyness DVD, as well as VH1's mini-series Fabulous Life: Really Rich Real Estate. Parson also served as the narrator for the Fox series Nashville.

Parson had voiced the title role (as well as many others) on Comedy Central's animated series Lil' Bush, and has lent his voice to episodes of Fox's popular shows Family Guy, American Dad!, The Cleveland Show, and Disney's Handy Manny.

Currently, he is the on-air promotions voice for the popular cable network, Syfy. He became the voice of Syfy after its rebranding in July, 2009.

Parson's voice is also featured in Gore Verbinski's animated feature, Rango, starring Johnny Depp.

Parson has also provided voice overs for several video games; he voiced the character Yusuf Tazim in Assassin's Creed: Revelations and has provided additional voiceover work for Red Faction: Guerrilla, Infamous 2, Mafia III, Grand Theft Auto V, Skylanders: Spyro's Adventure, Prototype 2, and Overwatch. Recently, he voiced the character Gladiolus Amicitia in Final Fantasy XV, Final Fantasy XV: Comrades, Final Fantasy XV: Episode Gladiolus, Final Fantasy XV: Monster of the Deep and Final Fantasy XV: Episode Ignis.

Parson resides in Los Angeles, California and is represented by Abrams Artists Agency.

== Filmography ==
=== Film ===
List of voice performances in film
Year	Title	Role	Notes
2001	Southpaw, Or: What I Learned About Being Left-Handed		Short film; also producer, director, writer, editor and cinematographer
2007	Jesus & George	Khalil, Miller	Short film
2010	Cats & Dogs: The Revenge of Kitty Galore	Hep Cat, Cat Spy Analyst	
2011	Rango	Hazel Moats, Kinski, Stump, Clinker, Lenny, Boseefus, Dirt Kid	
2014	Batman: Assault on Arkham	Stout Guard	Direct-to-video
2014	Yellowbird	Additional Voices	English dub
2016	Kingsglaive: Final Fantasy XV	Gladiolus Amicitia	English dub
2017	The Son of Bigfoot	Bigfoot/Dr. Harrison, Guard at Desk	English dub

=== Animation ===
List of voice performances in animation
Year	Title	Role	Notes
2007	My Gym Partner's a Monkey	Jiminy Japoopy	Episode: "Flesh Fur Fantasy/Substitute Sweetheart"
2007	Revisioned: Tomb Raider		2 episodes
2007	The 1/2 Hour News Hour	Guy White	5 episodes
2007	Nashville	Narrator	2 episodes
2007–2008	Lil' Bush	Lil' George, Lil' Al Gore, Lil' John Kerry, Lil' Bill Clinton, Additional Voices	16 episodes
2008	Mind of Mencia	George W. Bush	Episode: "Episode #4.8"
2009	Family Guy	Charlie Sheen, B.B. King	2 episodes
2009	Chowder	Fan, Dog Ball Rider, Head Coach	Episode: "Big Ball"
2010	The Cleveland Show	Michael Cera	Episode: "How Cleveland Got His Groove Back"
2011–2012	Handy Manny	Totts	2 episodes
2012	Extreme RVs	Narrator	3 episodes
2019	Love, Death & Robots	Bill	Episode: "Helping Hand"

=== Video games ===
List of voice performances in video games
Year	Title	Role	Notes
2006	Kids Trivia	The Host	
2008	The Spiderwick Chronicles	Goblin	
2008	Jumper: Griffin's Story	Italian Policeman	
2008	007: Quantum of Solace	Rivera, Additional Voices	
2008	Legendary	Additional Voices	
2009	Watchmen: The End Is Nigh	Rasto, Southern Prisoners	
2009	Red Faction: Guerrilla		
2011	Rango	Lars	
2011	Might & Magic Heroes VI	Krill	
2011	L.A. Noire	Lt. Driscoll	Uncredited
2011	Infamous 2	Male Pedestrians	
2011	Skylanders: Spyro's Adventure	Wham-Shell	
2011	Infamous: Festival of Blood	Male Pedestrians	
2011	Assassin's Creed: Revelations	Yusuf Tazim	
2012	Final Fantasy XIII-2	Additional Voices	English dub
2012	Gotham City Imposters		
2012	Prototype 2	Additional Voices	
2012	Skylanders: Giants	Wham-Shell	
2013	The Croods: Prehistoric Party!	Grug	
2013	Metro: Last Light	Artyom	
2013	Grand Theft Auto V	The Local Population	
2013	Skylanders: Swap Force	Wham-Shell	
2014	Lightning Returns: Final Fantasy XIII	Additional Voices	English dub
2014	Skylanders: Trap Team	Wham-Shell	
2014	Project Spark	Haakon	
2014	World of Warcraft: Warlords of Draenor	Exarch Akama	
2015	Rise of the Tomb Raider	Additional Voices	
2015	Skylanders: SuperChargers	Wham-Shell	
2016	Overwatch	Junkrat	
2016	Deus Ex: Mankind Divided	Additional Voices	
2016	World of Warcraft: Legion	Akama	
2016	Mafia III	Additional Voices	
2016	Final Fantasy XV	Gladiolus Amicitia	English dub
2017	Heroes of the Storm	Junkrat	
2017	Final Fantasy XV: Comrades	Gladiolus Amicitia	English dub
2017	Final Fantasy XV: Episode Gladiolus	Gladiolus Amicitia	English dub
2017	Final Fantasy XV: Monster of the Deep	Gladiolus Amicitia	English dub
2017	Final Fantasy XV: Episode Ignis	Gladiolus Amicitia	English dub
2018	Far Cry 5		
2018	God of War	Additional Voices	
2018	Prey: Mooncrash	Ramon Delgado, Benjamin Wheeler, Kerry Stafford	
2018	Red Dead Redemption 2	The Local Pedestrian Population	
2019	Metro Exodus	Artyom	
2024	Like a Dragon: Infinite Wealth	Bryce Fairchild	
2025	Dune Awakening	Einar Maia	
