= Man of the House (song) =

Single by Chuck Wicks

from the album Starting Now
- Released: January 31, 2009
- Genre: Country
- Length: 4:03
- Label: RCA Nashville
- Songwriter(s): Chuck Wicks, Michael Mobley
- Producer(s): Dann Huff, Monty Powell

Chuck Wicks singles chronology
"All I Ever Wanted" (2008)	"Man of the House" (2009)	"Hold That Thought" (2010)

"Man of the House" is a song co-written and recorded by American country music artist Chuck Wicks. It was released in January 2009 as the third single from the album Starting Now. The song reached #27 on the Billboard Hot Country Songs chart. The song was written by Wicks and Michael Mobley.

== Chart performance ==
Chart (2009)	Peak position
US Hot Country Songs (Billboard)	27
