= Stealing Cinderella =

Single by Chuck Wicks

from the album Starting Now
- Released: September 10, 2007
- Genre: Country
- Length: 4:04
- Label: RCA Nashville
- Songwriters: Chuck Wicks; George Teren; Rivers Rutherford
- Producers: Dann Huff; Monty Powell

Chuck Wicks singles chronology
"Stealing Cinderella" (2007)	"All I Ever Wanted" (2008)

"Stealing Cinderella" is a debut song recorded by American country music artist Chuck Wicks. It was released in September 2007 as the first single from the album Starting Now. The song was co-written by Wicks along with songwriters George Teren and Rivers Rutherford. The single produced the biggest debut for any new country artist in all of 2007, with fifty-two Billboard-monitored stations in the United States adding the song in its first official week of airplay. Overall, the song peaked at #5 on the U.S. Billboard Hot Country Songs charts.

On August 25, 2007, Wicks performed the song at his Grand Ole Opry debut. In October 2007, Wicks was invited by University of Tennessee football coach Phillip Fulmer to perform "Stealing Cinderella" at the wedding of Fulmer's daughter Courtney.

== Content ==
"Stealing Cinderella" is a ballad which, through allusions to the fairy tale of Cinderella, the narrator tells of a conversation with his girlfriend's father, asking for the father's permission to marry his daughter.

== Critical reception ==
Engine 145 reviewer Brady Vercher gave the song a "thumbs up" review. Although he thought that it was unusual to use Cinderella for a comparison (as Cinderella's father died in the fairy tale), and that the song's verses "gloss[ed] over" the allusions to the fairy tale, he nonetheless said that he could identify with the sentiment of the song's central character.

== Chart performance ==
"Stealing Cinderella" debuted at number 53 on the U.S. Billboard Hot Country Songs chart for the week of September 8, 2007. Fifty-two of the country music stations on Billboard's panel added the song in its first official week of airplay, boosting it to number 42 that week.

Chart (2007–2008)	Peak position
US Hot Country Songs (Billboard)	5
US Billboard Hot 100	56
US Billboard Pop 100	99
Canada Hot 100 (Billboard)	81

=== Year-end charts ===
Chart (2008)	Position
US Country Songs (Billboard)	32

== Certifications ==
Region	Certification	Certified units/sales
United States (RIAA)	Gold	500,000^{‡}
^{‡} Sales+streaming figures based on certification alone.
