= Twentysomething (TV series) =

- Twentysomething Series 2 Logo
- Genre: Comedy
- Created by: Jess Harris; Josh Schmidt
- Written by: Jess Harris
- Directed by: Paul Currie
- Starring: Jess Harris; Josh Schmidt; Hamish Blake; Simon Russell; Leah de Niese
- Opening theme: "Fear of Flying" performed by Dan Sultan
- Country of origin: Australia
- Original language: English
- No. of series: 2
- No. of episodes: 12

Production
- Producer: Nicole Minchin
- Production companies: High Wire Films; Electric Living Productions

Original release
- Network: ABC2
- Release: 6 September 2011 – 1 August 2013

Twentysomething is an Australian television comedy programme that premiered on 6 September 2011 on ABC2. The six-part comedy series was created by and starred Jess Harris and Josh Schmidt. It was based on a 2007 six-part RMITV supported series sitcom of the same name broadcast on Channel 31. Twentysomething returned for a second series on 27 June 2013.

A soundtrack was released on 21 October 2011.

== Series overview ==
Series	Episodes	Originally aired		DVD release date		
Series	Episodes	Series premiere	Series finale	Region 1	Region 2	Region 4
1	6	6 September 2011	11 October 2011	—N/a	—N/a	20 October 2011
2	6	27 June 2013	1 August 2013	—N/a	—N/a	7 August 2013

== Plot ==
Jess and Josh are best friends, housemates and 'twentysomething'. While their friends finish university degrees, climb the corporate ladder and settle down, Jess and Josh live for the weekend. When they find themselves unemployed, they decide it is time to become their own bosses.

Their entrepreneurial pursuits range from a hugely successful erotic house cleaning service, guided Melbourne tours that show twentysomething backpackers the city in a new light, an elite babysitters' agency for a very small 60% commission and even profiting from returning lost dogs for big rewards. Although Jess and Josh have every intention of succeeding, they somehow manage to self-destruct, always ending in chaos.

With Josh under added pressure from his older and more successful brother Nick (Simon Russell), to join the family advertising business, Jess finds a welcome distraction in Billy (Hamish Blake), an on again/off again ex who has recently returned home from an overseas adventure. When there is no one else, there is always Abby (Leah de Niese), the back up friend.

== Cast ==
=== Main/regular ===
- Jess Harris as Jess
- Josh Schmidt as Josh
- Hamish Blake as Billy
- Simon Russell as Nick
- Leah de Niese as Abby
- Laura Gordon as Anita

=== Guests ===
- Clayton Watson as Chris
- Ian Bliss as Auctioneer
- Judi Farr as Marie
- Katrina Milosevic as Career Counsellor
- Lucia Smyrk as Bridie
- Luke Arnold as Backpacker #1
- Mallory Jansen as Kelly
- Robert Taylor as Trevor
- Ryan Shelton as Billy's mate
- Saskia Hampele as Sally
- Tegan Higginbotham as Applicant 1

== See also ==
- Love Is a Four Letter Word, a drama series from 2001 set in Newtown, in Sydney that deals with the concerns facing urban 20somethings in Australia.
