= Starting Now (Chuck Wicks album) =

Studio album by Chuck Wicks
- Released: January 22, 2008
- Genre: Country
- Label: RCA Nashville
- Producers: Dann Huff; Monty Powell

Chuck Wicks chronology
Starting Now (2008)	Turning Point (2016)

Singles from Starting Now
- 1. "Stealing Cinderella" Released: September 10, 2007; 2. "All I Ever Wanted" Released: April 14, 2008; 3. "Man of the House" Released: January 31, 2009

Professional ratings
Review scores
Source	Rating
AllMusic	3/5 stars
Country Standard Time	mixed
Engine 145	2/5 stars

Starting Now is the debut studio album by American country music artist Chuck Wicks. It was released on January 22, 2008, by RCA Records Nashville. The album debuted at number 24 on the U.S. Billboard 200 chart, selling about 20,000 copies in its first week. Wicks co-wrote all but one of the songs.

"Stealing Cinderella", which was released as the album's lead single in September 2007, was a top 5 hit on the Hot Country Songs chart. The album produced two more top 40 hits with "All I Ever Wanted" and "Man of the House".

== Track listing ==
No.	Title	Writer(s)	Length
1.	"All I Ever Wanted"	Chuck Wicks; Anna Wilson; Monty Powell	3:26
2.	"Good Time Comin' On"	Wicks; Powell; Dave Berg	3:33
3.	"Stealing Cinderella"	Wicks; Rivers Rutherford; George Teren	4:03
4.	"If We Loved"	Jason Sellers; Patrick Jason Matthews	3:42
5.	"When You're Single"	Wicks; Michael Mobley	2:58
6.	"Starting Now"	Wicks; Wilson; Jeff Franzell	4:21
7.	"The Easy Part"	Wicks; Blair Daly; Troy Verges	3:39
8.	"What If You Stay"	Wicks; Daly; Verges	3:55
9.	"She's Gonna Hurt Somebody"	Wicks; Jim Collins; Wendell Mobley	3:31
10.	"Mine All Mine"	Wicks; Matthews; Jon C. Mabe	3:31
11.	"Man of the House"	Wicks; M. Mobley	4:03

== Personnel ==
Vocals

- Perry Coleman – background vocals
- Chip Davis – background vocals
- Michael Mobley – background vocals
- Mitch Malloy – background vocals
- Monty Powell – background vocals
- Jason Sellers – background vocals
- Russell Terrell – background vocals
- Ilya Toshinsky – background vocals
- Chuck Wicks – lead vocals
- Anna Wilson – background vocals

Musicians

- Bruce Bouton – steel guitar
- J. T. Corenflos – electric guitar
- Dan Dugmore – steel guitar
- Shannon Forrest – drums
- Tony Harrell – keyboards
- Dann Huff – electric guitar
- Charles Judge – conductor, string arrangements, keyboards, Hammond organ, synthesizer strings
- Troy Lancaster – electric guitar
- Nashville String Machine – string section
- Steve Nathan – piano
- Russ Pahl – steel guitar
- Monty Powell – electric guitar
- Ilya Toshinsky – acoustic guitar
- Glenn Worf – bass guitar
- Jonathan Yudkin – fiddle, mandolin

Production

- Dan Huff – producer
- Monty Powell – producer

== Chart performance ==
=== Weekly charts ===
Chart (2008)	Peak position
US Billboard 200	24
US Top Country Albums (Billboard)	7

=== Year-end charts ===
Chart (2008)	Position
US Top Country Albums (Billboard)	64

=== Singles ===
Year	Single	Peak chart positions		
Year	Single	US Country	US	CAN
2007	"Stealing Cinderella"	5	56	81
2008	"All I Ever Wanted"	14	86	—
2009	"Man of the House"	27	—	—
"—" denotes releases that did not chart
