= Amp'd Mobile =

Defunct 3G cellphone service

Amp'd Mobile Inc.
- Industry: Wireless Services
- Founded: 2005
- Defunct: Bankrupt in 2007
- Headquarters: Los Angeles, California, USA
- Website: www.ampd.com

Amp'd Mobile was a cellular phone service launched in the United States in late 2005 and in Canada in early 2007. The company was a Mobile Virtual Network Operator offering 3G voice and data services over the Verizon Wireless EV-DO network, including text and picture messaging, push-to-talk, and over-the-air downloadable applications and content (including Video on Demand) from its Amp'd Live service. Its primary non-venture capital investors were MTV Networks and Universal Music Group. The service targeted 18- to 35-year-olds, and was the first integrated mobile entertainment company for youth, young professionals and early adopters, similar to Helio.

== Services ==
=== Amp'd Live ===
Amp'd mobile's service was built around Amp'd Live, a permanently installed BREW application on all Amp'd CDMA phones, which featured downloadable and streaming video on-demand clips, live events such as Supercross, streaming phonecast radio stations, downloadable content such as games, ringtones, and songs.

Amp'd Live TV channels included Comedy Central Mobile, MTV Mobile, Spike TV, Oxygen Mobile, MTVU, VH1, LOGO, UFC TV, Fox News, Fox Sports, Playboy Mobile, Discovery Mobile, History Channel, A&E, Biography Channel, Style, Break TV, E!, WE Mobile, Speed, NBA TV, Girls Gone Wild TV, and Adult Swim Mobile. The adult animated series Lil' Bush aired on Amp'd Live TV before being picked up by Comedy Central.

== Amp'd Mobile Canada ==
On March 14, 2007, Amp'd Mobile Canada was launched. It was based on a mobile virtual network operator (MVNO) partnership with Telus Mobility. Amp'd managed the marketing and multimedia content, while Telus Mobility handled the billing, customer care, retail aspects, and network.

On August 1, 2007, after noticing Amp'd Mobile's financial problems in the USA, Telus Mobility announced that it would be discontinuing Amp'd service in Canada. Multimedia content was quickly pulled down, but users could still obtain a similar service from Telus Mobility or other providers. A transition period ensured uninterrupted voice and messaging services. During this time, customers were contacted via phone and were instructed to transition to the Telus Mobility network or that of another provider.

Because the Amp'd Mobile phones were CDMA devices, it is very difficult to activate them on a cellular network today. Amp'd Mobile claimed that customers "will need to replace" their phones and service via Telus Mobility at no extra charge with a $300 credit. However, it is still possible to activate an Amp'd Mobile Phone with a CDMA carrier.

On March 17, 2008, nearly a year after Amp'd Mobile Canada's debut, Koodo Mobile was launched by Telus Mobility as their discount MVNO. More importantly, it targeted the youth demographic previously sought by Amp'd. Unlike Amp'd, Koodo does not provide multimedia content. Koodo does, however, offer customizable budget plans for unlimited SMS, MMS, social networking, and up to 10 GB of Internet data.

== Company and subscriber numbers ==
=== 2006 ===
At the end of 2006, Amp'd Mobile had over 100,000 subscribers. 89 percent of its customer base was on postpaid contracts, and its total average revenue per user was “well over” $100 per month.

=== 2007 ===
Amp'd Mobile filed for Chapter 11 bankruptcy protection on June 1, 2007. Its subscriber base at the end of the first quarter was about 175,000 customers.

On July 20, Amp'd announced its intentions to sell off all its assets at auction. In addition, Best Buy discontinued carrying the Amp'd post-paid service.

On July 21, 2007, text messages began to be sent to Amp'd Mobile customer phones that stated:

Your service may be disconnected on 7.24 @ 12:01 am. Go to www.ampd.com or contact the location where you activated your service for further information.

On July 24, 2007, Amp'd website updated its FAQ with potential service disconnection pushed back to July 31, 2007.

On July 31, 2007, Amp'd sent a text message:

Ampd service ends @midnight 8/1. Keep your Ampd phone and get 100 free TXT by switching to Prexar Mobile. For info, go to http://www.prexarmobile.com

As of June 2008, the Prexar Mobile website and brand are defunct.

== Bankruptcy ==
On June 1, 2007, Amp'd filed for Chapter 11 bankruptcy. According to court documents, around 80,000 of its 175,000 subscribers were recorded as nonpaying customers. Bankruptcy protection was brought on by Verizon Wireless who threatened to cut off service to Amp'd if the debt owed to Verizon wasn't paid. Amp'd Mobile together with its main creditor Kings Road Investment Ltd. sued Verizon Wireless, seeking a court order that barred Verizon from cutting off service to Amp'd Mobile from its network. On June 22, 2007, an agreement was reached between Verizon, Amp'd and Kings Road to pay Verizon off with cash collateral and allow Amp'd the use of Verizon's network. The settlement was heard in the U.S. Bankruptcy Court on June 25, 2007. Amp'd indicated an intent to sell off its assets.

== Service shutdown ==
Amp'd sent out a text message to all of its users on July 22, 2007 stating that as of July 24, 12:01 a.m. they would be discontinuing all services. This date was later extended to July 31, 2007.

On the evening of July 23, the Amp'd website indicated that customer service would no longer be available. The fate of mobile phone numbers for existing customers who have not yet ported to another carrier was still unknown.

On July 26, 2007, Amp'd sent a text message that gave additional information on how bankruptcy would affect its subscribers' agreement. The text read as follows:

AMPD MSG:

Additional info about how the Ampd bankruptcy will affect your subscriber agreement is available at

http://chapter11.epiqsystems.com/AMI

On July 31, 2007, Amp'd sent another text message:

Ampd svc ends @midnight 8/1. Keep your Ampd phone and get 100 free TXT by switching to Prexar Mobile. For info go to http://prexarmobile.com/

== Sponsorship ==
Amp'd Mobile was the sponsor of VH1's comedy-skit show: "Acceptable TV." Its name, brand, and mascot "Clarity the Amp'd Mobile Dog" were included in many of the show's skits during the Spring 2007 season. The mascot was actually created as a joke, which was later approved by Amp'd Mobile. Amp'd Mobile also sponsored an up-and-coming talented beatboxer known as "nemesis" he had downloadable content on the Amp'd Live network where he gave beatboxing lessons and conducted on camera celebrity interviews and red carpet events, he hosted many events for Amp'd Mobile and was sponsored from 2005 through 2007. Amp'd Mobile was also a prominent advertiser at Ultimate Fighting Championship events.

Amp'd Mobile was the title sponsor for the American Motorcyclist Association (AMA) Supercross series for 2006 and 2007. Monster Energy became the title sponsor for the 2008 season. Amp'd was also a personal sponsor of Chad Reed and other professional Motocross riders. It was also one of the sponsors of the PBR's Built Ford Tough Series during the 2007 season; it was also the first year that the BFTS hosted an event in New York City's Madison Square Garden, and for 2007 only the event was named the Amp'd Mobile Invitational.

== Criticism ==
=== Customer service ===
A major complaint about Amp'd Mobile was its lack of customer service. Problems activating the service and plans not matching those advertised on the company's website had been reported. Getting in contact with customer service proved to be a large issue. Many customers claimed to have found themselves on hold via phone support for hours, only to be hung up on. Also, instances of mail-in rebates being "lost" or never fulfilled had been reported. Amp'd customer service was contracted to ClientLogic at launch. Support was later handled by Sento Corporation, but some time after the bankruptcy filing this support had ended, which had forced Sento to lay off around 200 people in Albuquerque, New Mexico and Orem, Utah.
