= All I Ever Wanted (Chuck Wicks song) =

Single by Chuck Wicks

from the album Starting Now
- Released: April 14, 2008
- Genre: Country
- Length: 3:26
- Label: RCA Nashville
- Songwriters: Chuck Wicks; Anna Wilson; Monty Powell
- Producers: Dann Huff; Monty Powell

Chuck Wicks singles chronology
"Stealing Cinderella" (2007)	"All I Ever Wanted" (2008)	"Man of the House" (2009)

"All I Ever Wanted" is a song recorded by American country music artist Chuck Wicks. It was released in April 2008 as the second single from his debut album Starting Now. Wicks co-wrote the song with Anna Wilson and Monty Powell.

== Music video ==
The music video was directed by Kristin Barlowe and premiered in July 2008.

== Chart performance ==
"All I Ever Wanted" debuted at number 50 on the U.S. Billboard Hot Country Songs chart for the week of May 3, 2008.

Chart (2008)	Peak position
US Hot Country Songs (Billboard)	14
US Billboard Hot 100	86
