= Junker Queen =

Fictional character in the Overwatch franchise

- Overwatch character
- Junker Queen's appearance in Overwatch 2
- First appearance: Overwatch (2017)
- First major appearance: Overwatch 2 (2023)
- Created by: Arnold Tsang
- Voiced by: Siho Ellsmore (Overwatch); Leah de Niese (Overwatch 2)

In-universe information
- Class: Tank
- Nationality: Australian

The Junker Queen is a character who first appeared in the 2016 video game Overwatch, a Blizzard Entertainment–developed first-person hero shooter, and the resulting franchise. Designed by Arnold Tsang, she was introduced as a background character in a 2017 update for Overwatch to help establish the game's "Junkertown" setting, she serves as its ruler. Her voice can be heard at various points on the in-game map of the same name, broadcasting over its PA system. In the game's 2023 sequel, Overwatch 2, she was added as a playable character upon release, establishing her real name as Odessa "Dez" Stone and expanding her backstory. Voiced by Siho Ellsmore in the original Overwatch, Leah de Niese took over the role for the character's full reveal in Overwatch 2.

Despite only appearing in voice and on a poster in the map itself, the character developed a prominent fandom since her introduction. Players hoped for a playable version of her to be added to the title, while various fan works and cosplays followed suit, with game director Jeff Kaplan further teasing her inclusion. After her release in Overwatch 2, media outlets heavily praised her design, mainly in terms of the visual diversity she brought to the game's female designs. She was repeatedly praised by TechRadar in particular, whose writers used her as an example of a character with an outfit that empowered rather than objectified, and how they wanted to see similar character variety in the game. However complaints also arose, such as Mathew Rodriguez of Kotaku feeling her design followed much in the same vein as other female Overwatch characters by portraying her with a slender body and a lack of visible scars, and some players calling her too dissimilar from other "tank" class characters, instead seeming narrow and leading to them confusing her for other characters during gameplay.

== Conception and development ==
While designing the game's "Junkertown" setting as part of a 2017 update for Overwatch, assistant art director Arnold Tsang came up with the idea of a "Queen" character that would hold competitions at the settlement. Simply called "The Queen" originally, the character was introduced to players as an atmospheric element for an in-game map of the same name, as her voice lines can be heard over a PA system on the map. She is also seen on various posters that decorate it, with Tsang hoping it would generate player interest in the character for them to explore later. In April 2019, as part of a livestream at Blizzard headquarters with various streamers, game director Jeff Kaplan revealed that Tsang had drawn several pieces of concept art for the character and that they had "big plans" for her, though with a longer time frame in mind compared to other characters. When designing her playable character and gameplay, they used her existing lore as a basis, aiming to portray her with "tough, almost brutal, personality" while also wanting to avoid anything that may seem magical or elegant. They were also aware of their player community's perception of the character, and aimed to keep her in line with those expectations.

Junker Queen was originally voiced by Siho Ellsmore in Overwatch, who provided a voice over for the Junkertown map reveal trailer and voice lines for the map. With Overwatch 2, Leah de Niese took over the role. de Niese, who had previously not voiced a video game character, noted that she was originally unaware what character or even game she was auditioning for, other than it was a "fierce, rough-as-guts Aussie" which she enjoyed because it allowed her to use her natural accent, and leaned into the character's "wild nature". After getting the role, she noted there was very little material to establish her voice for Junker Queen outside of storyboards for an in-production animated short, and researched the fandom to get a better idea of the character and audience expectations of her portrayal.

=== Design ===
Standing 7 feet tall, Junker Queen is a muscular woman with the center of her blue hair stylized into a tall mohawk while the remainder is unified into a long braid that dangles off each side of her head. Black makeup surrounds her eyes extending downward to her cheeks. In addition she has several piercings: two tusk earrings dangling from her ears, lower lip ring, and small spikes on the sides of her brow above her eyes. Her outfit primarily consists of a sports bra, short shorts and boots that extend to the knees, while a torn shirt covers her chest, exposing her cleavage and midriff. In addition she has stockings connecting her right boot to her shorts, a sashed studded belt with a red cloth dangling from it, and a red sleeved magnetic gauntlet harnessed across her shoulders to her left arm with red feathers extending from that shoulder. Across her body are various spiked bits of armor notably on her right knee and left shoulder, some of which have been recognized by fans as faceplates from "omnics", a type of sentient robot in the Overwatch setting.

Like other Overwatch characters, Junker Queen received skins, unlockable cosmetic items to change her in-game appearance. Of particular note, her "Wastelander" skin was designed for use in the character's cinematic trailer as well, resulting in a collaborative effort between the various art departments at Blizzard Entertainment. Meanwhile, the "Zeus" skin presents her in an Ancient Greece–themed outfit with glowing yellow electric highlights, meant to tie into the game's "Battle for Olympus" game mode. Designed to play into her "super-charged, electric aesthetic" primarily due to her magnetic gauntlet, while also sticking with the "rock and roll" theme of the character, and applying electrical visual effects to her attacks in-game.

== Appearances ==
Junker Queen is an Australian woman introduced as a backstory character in the 2016 game Overwatch. First introduced in a 2017 update for the video game Overwatch, she is the ruler of "Junkertown", and directly opposed to fellow characters Junkrat and Roadhog, who she has banned from the settlement with orders to shoot them on sight. Junker Queen did not physically appear until the game's sequel, Overwatch 2, which introduced her as a playable character upon release. Trained at a young age to fight hostile omnics roaming the Australian wasteland, she utilized parts of them to form armor, namely a large gauntlet that can manipulate electromagnetism. Outside of Overwatch, Junker Queen also appears in the updated dating sim game Loverwatch, exclusive to Chinese regions.

Her backstory is elaborated on in the animated short The Wastelander, revealing her name as Odessa "Dez" Stone. Banished from Junkertown as a child along with her family, she returned thirteen years later to participate in "the Reckoning", a free-for-all combat to challenge the settlement's ruler. However the event turned out to be rigged, as the other two combatants were working for him, though after showing concern for their lives they support her instead. Defeated, he pleads for mercy, and she banishes him like he had her family, and takes power as the Junker Queen. She decides to rule in a more kind manner, helping the settlement thrive while still overseeing the fights.

In literary works, Junker Queen is featured in the short story A Friendly Rivalry by Justin Groot, Gavin Jurgens Fyhrie, and Miranda Moyer, set after the events of the game's "Zero Hour" storyline. In it, she is about to execute Junkrat and Roadhog for their crimes against her settlement by making them fight her champion, Wrecking Ball. When Junkrat offers to lead her to hidden treasure to save their lives, she accepts, and he leads her to a hidden chamber. While the story does not say what they find, she asks Wrecking Ball if he "can get it flying". She is later mentioned in the motion comic Vengeance Comes, where the character Mauga is tasked with recruiting her help for the terrorist organization Talon.

=== Gameplay ===
In Overwatch, Junker Queen is classified as a Tank-class character, designed to absorb large amounts of damage from the enemy team in team compositions while protecting their teammates, as well as granting her a passive ability that provides resistance to attacks that cause a "knockback" effect. Her primary weapon, a pump action shotgun with a bladed grip called "Scattergun", is a short range weapon that fires a spread of projectiles. While she was depicted with a large axe early on and the developers initially considered it for her primary weapon, they reconsidered after reflecting on past issues that arose with melee-focused characters, and went with the shotgun instead.

Junker Queen also has several abilities that require activation, though the first three have a "cooldown" period after use and are unable to be used again during that duration. "Commanding Shout" applies a short term movement speed bonus to herself and nearby allies, while also increasing the maximum health for all allies temporarily. "Jagged Blade" has her throw a combat knife at a target, and can be activated again to recall it, pulling any enemy hit by the projectile along with it. "Carnage" meanwhile has her swing her axe in front of her hitting enemies in a wide arc, and in a later update reduced the cooldown period of the ability for each enemy struck. Both Jagged Blade and Carnage apply a status effect on enemies called "Wounded", which cause them to lose health as a damage over time effect while restoring health to Junker Queen due to her "Adrenaline Rush" passive ability.

Lastly her 'ultimate' ability, called "Rampage," requires charging before use. The ability charges slowly during the course of gameplay, and can be charged faster through damage dealt to the enemy team. Once the ability meter is full, the ability can be activated to charge a large distance. Enemies caught by the charge are displaced, inflicted with damage and hit with both the Wounded status effect and a secondary Anti-healing effect that prevents them from healing for a short duration. Early incarnations of the move had her spinning forward herself, however they felt it was too "magical" a move and incorporated her magnetic gauntlet more directly into the attack.

== Promotion and reception ==
To promote Overwatch 2, Blizzard showcased her as a new character at the 2022 Xbox & Bethesda Games Showcase available upon release of the title later that year. In 2023, a large, 16-inch-tall (41 cm) statue was released on Blizzard's online store to further promote the character, made out of a mixture of PVC and polyresin. Similarly, Funko Pop also released a figure of the character in 2023. In 2026, cards and keychains featuring Junker Queen were included in Chinese Burger King meals as part of a cross-promotion between the company and Loverwatch.

Despite only being a background character in the original Overwatch, fans took a heavy liking to Junker Queen due to the Junkertown map reveal trailer's voiceover, and then moreso when the map became playable on the game's public test server. Other journalists such as Gita Jackson of Kotaku and Chris Moyse of Destructoid further noted the fan reaction, with Moyse noting players heavily requesting the "Legion of Doom-esque lovely, all spiked armour and Mad Max-haircut" be added as a playable character, with a large amount of fan art and cosplay following suit. Jeff Kaplan in turn referenced people's requests for a playable version of the queen prior to the character's actual unveiling, such as on his 2019 "Overwatch Yule Log" stream where he mused with the audience what character class she would be.

The character's full release was also met with positive reception. Jess Reyes of Inverse praised the design differences between her and fellow character Zarya despite both being "buff ladies" as examples of body diversity other games could follow. While TechRadar's Cat Bussell was critical of Blizzard's female character design in Overwatch, she praised Junker Queen as an example of one of the characters that "do reasonable and expressive outfits – the kind of outfits that empower rather than objectify." In another article for the site, Elie Gould voiced their approval of Junker Queen's design as what they wanted to see more of in contrast to how similar many of the female characters appeared. They added that it "captures everything you would hope for in a character from the Mad Max-esque location that is Australia in the Overwatch universe," and further praised the distinct "towering frame and wild face" providing visual variance to the character that Gould felt only male characters were typically afforded.

On the other hand, Mathew Rodriguez of Kotaku cited her as example of Blizzard's shortcomings when it came to body diversity, noting that while she was portrayed as a larger woman and a brawler, she had the usual slender waist for female characters in the game and unlike the male characters, lacked visible scars. Players meanwhile complained that the character's appearance did not match the standard appearance the game normally attributed to its "tank" class characters and felt she should be proportionately wider, with complaints of her being "too thin" being common as noted by NME and GamesRadar+. In addition, other players complained her silhouette was too similar to that of other characters, causing frequent confusion in the heat of combat during gameplay.
