= Engaged and Underage =

- Genre: Documentary
- Country of origin: United States
- No. of seasons: 2
- No. of episodes: 20

Production
- Executive producers: Amy Bailey; Dave Sirulnick; Lauren Eskelin; Stuart Cohn
- Running time: 21 minutes (excluding commercials)
- Production companies: MTV News & Docs

Original release
- Network: MTV
- Release: January 22, 2007 – August 2, 2008

Engaged & Underage is an American reality television series that aired on MTV. The series follows couples, that have at least one partner between the ages of 18 and 20, in the final weeks leading to their wedding. The series debuted on January 22, 2007 to 1.7 million viewers.

== Episodes ==
Season	Episodes	Originally released	
Season	Episodes	First released	Last released
1	9	January 22, 2007	March 19, 2007
2	10	June 18, 2007	August 19, 2007

=== Season 1 ===
No.	Title	Original release date
1	"Lauren and David"	January 22, 2007
2	"Ashley and Byron"	January 29, 2007
3	"Chantel and Jacob"	February 2, 2007
4	"Bre and Josh"	February 9, 2007
5	"Jenn and Jake"	February 16, 2007
6	"Amanda and Chris"	February 26, 2007
7	"Ashley and Josh"	March 5, 2007
8	"Frank and Jess"	March 12, 2007
9	"Where Are They Now?"	March 19, 2007

=== Season 2 ===
No.	Title	Original release date
1	"Aussie and Jason"	June 18, 2007
2	"Angel and Christian"	June 25, 2007
3	"Mandy and Josh"	July 2, 2007
4	"April and Kenny"	July 8, 2007
5	"Jewel and Cory"	July 8, 2007
6	"Erica and Josh"	July 23, 2007
7	"Krystle and Kiel"	July 30, 2007
8	"Maribel and Julio"	August 6, 2007
9	"Cassie and Emmelie"	August 12, 2007
10	"Michelle and Ben"	August 19, 2007

=== Specials ===
No.	Title	Original release date
-	"Engaged & Underage: Live!"	August 2, 2008
