= Lil' Bush =

- Created by: Donick Cary
- Voices of: Chris Parson; Dave B. Mitchell; Mara Cary; Donick Cary; Ann Villella; Iggy Pop; Kari Wahlgren
- Countries of origin: United States; Bulgaria
- No. of seasons: 2
- No. of episodes: 17 (1 unaired)

Production
- Running time: 22 minutes
- Production companies: Sugar Shack 2000 (season 1); Amp'd Mobile (season 1); Sugarlab Digital Studios (season 2); Sugarshack Animation

Original release
- Network: Comedy Central
- Release: June 13, 2007 – May 15, 2008

Lil' Bush is an American satirical adult animated sitcom which premiered on June 13, 2007, on Comedy Central. The series features caricatures of members of the George W. Bush administration, and other American and international political figures, most of which are depicted as children.

The first season's episodes each consist of two story segments, with each featuring a musical performance by a band composed of main characters. The second season, which premiered on March 13, 2008, consists of ten episodes, and features the full twenty-two-minute storylines including the musical number. The second-season finale aired on May 15, 2008.

== Premise ==
Lil' Bush takes place in an alternate reality version of the present day, where George H. W. Bush is president and George W. Bush (referred to as "Lil' George"), along with his associates (members of George W. Bush's real-life former staff), are children attending Beltway Elementary School. Issues in which the latter Bush administration is involved (for example, the Iraq War) are transferred to the elder Bush but feature the younger Bush interacting with them in various ways.

Also, just as George Bush's father is president, the parents of the other kids are members of the elder Bush's cabinet (all depicted as their real-life adult counterparts, with the exception of the elder Cheney, who is depicted as Cheney with a Darth Vader helmet). The show pokes fun at George W. Bush's policies in a direct manner and provides criticism of his administration.

== Production ==
In 2004, Donick Cary created Lil' Bush as a series for Amp'd Mobile cell phones. The series was then picked up by Comedy Central and became one of the first web series to be adapted to television. To handle animation for the series, Cary founded Sugarshack Animation with offices in Los Angeles, Miami, and Bulgaria, the show was animated using Adobe Flash.

== Characters ==
=== Main characters ===
- Lil' George (George W. Bush), voiced by Chris Parson; the leader of the gang, he often makes choices without thinking about the consequences and is seldom corrected by his friends. Like the real George W. Bush, he enjoys giving people various nicknames. He has a crush on the series' caricature Laura Bush, refers to her as a "chubby nerd". Additionally, though the show is entitled Lil Bush, the character himself is always referred to by the other characters (and in the scripts) as Lil' George.
- George Sr. (George H. W. Bush), voiced by Dave B. Mitchell; the President of the United States who acts as somewhat of a straight man to Lil' George. He is shown to be extremely weak physically, and possessing a deep love for Saltine crackers. He and Barbara are also swingers and although he loves his wife, he has a specific time scheduled at work for "old people sex" with his secretary. He is also seen to be allergic to people who look Asian as seen in the 'Hall Monitor' episode (a reference to when Bush threw up onto the lap of Japan's Prime Minister).
- Barbara Bush, voiced by Mara Cary; the sexually frustrated wife of the President, so much so that she once resorts to having a tryst with Lil' Cheney. She has also admitted to having an affair with Michael Dukakis. She was confused with a polar bear in "Gay Friend". According to George Sr., Barbara Bush was a "Frankenstein of presidential parts" added with woman parts that he brought to life, giving her the head of George Washington.
- Jeb Bush, voiced by Dave B. Mitchell; the indestructible but mentally undeveloped brother to Lil' George. His family shows a general apathy towards his well-being. This could possibly be because he is able to withstand things that would kill an ordinary person, and sometimes benefits from them. In one episode, Jeb withstands a nuclear blast, and in another, climbs onto a missile about to be fired, but appears completely unharmed. When Jeb is hit in the head with a frying pan, he speaks normally (then voiced by Colin Meloy) and openly criticizes his father's governmental decisions. Jeb is treated like a pet, as he is taken for walks, given flea dips, and eats from a bowl with his name on it (often next to the actual family dog Barney).
- Lil' Cheney (Dick Cheney), voiced by Donick Cary; a friend of Lil' George, he growls incoherently rather than speaking, with the occasional interjection of a contextually relevant word or phrase, (saying "reh-reh-REH-massive heart attack-reh-reh-REH," for instance); the rest of the characters appear to understand him. He has deranged and violent tendencies, such as consuming raw—sometimes living—meat and blood.
- Lil' Condi (Condoleezza Rice), voiced by Ann Villella in season 1 and Kari Wahlgren in season 2, acts as the voice of reason for her friends, though they routinely ignore her sensible advice. She has a crush on Lil' George, and attempts to woo him in various ways throughout the series, such as doing his homework for him and gaining an abundance of weight.
- Lil' Rummy (Donald Rumsfeld), voiced by Iggy Pop; seems to be the only remotely intelligent character on the show aside from Lil' Condi. He also displays a sadistic side, possibly resulting from the fact that he is abused by his father. He is sometimes used as a scapegoat, such as when George Sr. says one way to cover up a scandal is to blame it on Lil' Rummy.

=== Lil' Democrats ===
The series antagonists (also called Lil' Dems).

- Lil' Hillary (Hillary Clinton): voiced by Kari Wahlgren (in season 2); girlfriend of Lil' Bill, she works at an abortion clinic after school "just for fun" and is also suggested to be bisexual after kissing Lil' Condi.
- Lil' Barack Obama: voiced by Tim Meadows; shown laughing at Lil' George, he is "nuked" by Lil' George when he is seen sneaking a cigarette outside of the White House. He also leads Lil' George's friends after Lil' Bush abandons them for Lil' Tony Blair. He attempts to enlist their help in building a "Home for Humanity" for a single mother, but the gang burns it down (assuming that the plan was to commit insurance fraud or turn it into a dungeon and force single mothers to fight to the death) and use the money to buy themselves scooters. He frequently answers questions by saying "Yes we can."
- Lil' Al Gore: voiced by Chris Parson; always encouraging others to be eco-friendly and shown with an extremely eco-friendly house with many inventions created by Lil' Al himself (including a time machine, and an interconnected series of ropes which create a net that "catches dreams", he calls the "internet"). Lil' Bush constantly ridicules him for being slightly overweight (to make everyone else think so) despite the fact that Lil' George is shown to have more body weight than Lil' Al.
- Lil' Nancy Pelosi: shown sewing a flag with rainbow-colored stripes, she is also "nuked" by Lil' George. Voiced by production assistant Martha Cary, who is the show creator's half-sister.
- Lil' John Kerry: voiced by Chris Parson, Lil' Kerry's voice bores Lil' Bush and the gang. He loves ketchup, and says that someday he might marry it, in reference to his real-world marriage to condiment heiress Teresa Heinz Kerry.
- Lil' John Edwards: apparently obsessed with hair in reference to Edwards' $400 haircuts.
- Lil' Bill (Bill Clinton): voiced by Chris Parson; constantly cheats on Lil' Hillary.
- Tiny Kucinich: who wants to someday fly with doves. Sometimes has to be handled like an infant. Voiced by Jason Nash, who does a variety of other voices for the show.

== Episodes ==
Season	Episodes	Originally released	
Season	Episodes	First released	Last released
1	7	June 13, 2007	March 11, 2008
2	10	March 13, 2008	May 15, 2008

=== Season 1 (2007-08) ===
No. overall	No. in season	Title	Original release date	Prod. code
1	1	"Iraq / First Kiss"	June 13, 2007	102
Lil' Bush and the Gang go to Iraq to find the perfect Father's Day gift; the Gang bets to see who can kiss a girl first. The gang is shown as Guns N' Roses in a musical number.
2	2	"Nuked / Camp"	June 20, 2007	101
Lil' Bush learns to stand up to a bully named Lil' Kim Jong-II by bombing, among other things, his residence; Lil' Bush and the Gang go to summer camp and discover a sleeper cell. The Lil' Bush Band is shown as the Sex Pistols, and later as Kiss in this episode.
3	3	"Gay Friend / Mexican"	June 27, 2007	103
Lil' Bush meets Lil' Tony Blair, and the two become close friends and cheerleaders for the school's football team, while the Gang begins to blindly follow Lil' Barack Obama in Lil' George's place; Under his father's threat of canceling Martin Luther King day, Lil' Bush and the Gang find an alternate way to complete their chores, with the help of illegal immigrant workers. The gang parodies WHAM! and Toni Basil in their musical numbers.
4	4	"Global Warming / Hall Monitor"	July 11, 2007	104
The gang try to thwart Lil' Al's Lil' Live Earth concert, featuring the Lil' Foo Fighters and Lil' Red Hot Chili Peppers to secure the earth's future as a completely flooded uninhabitable wasteland that the gang sees as an "awesome water park"; Lil' Bush competes with Lil' John McCain for the position of Hall Monitor by exploiting the school's fear of hippies. The band ends up parodying the Red Hot Chili Peppers (wearing only socks during their performance) in the first short, and in the second short, they parody the Grateful Dead.
5	5	"Evolution / Press Corps Dinner"	July 18, 2007	105
Lil' Cheney goes to hell after perishing of a heart attack, where he proves himself more evil than Satan, and Lil' Bush becomes a born again Christian and denounces evolution; Lil' Bush is the headliner at his father's Press Corps Dinner when he discovers he has a knack for comedy. The Lil' Bush band parodies several rap artists, including Eminem and 50 Cent, in an anti-evolution video.
6	6	"Haunted House / Hot Dog"	July 25, 2007	106
Lil' Bush and the gang spend the night up in the haunted White House attic, and are visited by the ghosts of the Founding Fathers which turn out to be the Lil' Democrats in disguise (except for the real ghost of George Washington in search for his head)-- this short parodies the chase scenes and imagery of Scooby-Doo; Lil' Bush and the Gang meet Lil' Michael Moore, who attempts to expose their torture of the school cafeteria workers in an attempt to bring back the American institution of hot dogs when the school decides to be in favor of a more multi-cultural menu (based on the Abu Ghraib torture photos). The "Hot Dog" episode also features Jeb with a short-lived but greatly improved intelligence as a result of a frying pan blow to his head.
7	7	"Walter Reed"	March 11, 2008	107
Lil' Bush and his gang put on a concert at the nearby Walter Reed veteran's hospital, which accidentally brings media attention to the atrocious conditions there. As punishment, he and the gang must raise money for repairs, which the eventually spend on themselves. Featuring Henry Rollins as the voice of an injured veteran that Lil' Bush nicknames "Halfsy". The band parodies AC/DC in this episode. Note: This 11-minute storyline was produced but never aired as a backup episode. The network was worried that the story of show 105, featuring Lil' Dick Cheney dying of a heart attack, would be insensitive to air if the real Dick Cheney had a heart attack. It appears on the Lil' Bush Season One DVD, along with an introduction from show creator Donick Cary and writer Opus Moreschi.

=== Season 2 (2008) ===
No. overall	No. in season	Title	Original release date	Prod. code
8	1	"St. Patrick's Day"	March 13, 2008	201
The Lil' Gang doesn't want the Lil' Dems to ruin St. Patrick's Day with their liberal and tolerant St. Patrick's Day float. They enlist the help of Lil' Karl Rove (voiced by Kevin Federline), who gives them advice and does some bad rapping as his alter-ego, MC Rove. Meanwhile, first lady Barbara gets a tanning bed and inadvertently cooks her liver.
9	2	"Big Pharma"	March 20, 2008	203
When Beltway Elementary's book fair is taken over by a drug company, it becomes a drug fair, and all the Lil' Cronies get hooked on meds. In order to kick their addiction, they face off against the big pharmaceutical company's charismatic CEO (voiced by The Grateful Dead's Phil Lesh). Meanwhile, George Sr. attempts to appear more manly for the state of the union by taking beard-growth pills. Unfortunately, the side effects involve a prolonged and prominent boner.
10	3	"Crony Break-up"	March 27, 2008	202
After a big fight, the Lil' Gang break up. Each of them finds comfort in new friends: Lil' Mitt Romney, Lil' Rudy Giuliani, Lil' Fred Thompson and Tiny Dennis Kucinich. When the new friendships turn disastrous, the Lil' Cronies put their differences aside in a heartwarming, vomit-filled reunion. Meanwhile, Jeb Bush inadvertently invents a new diet craze called "The Pudding Hole" which involves leaving a hole in your stomach so food can pour out.
11	4	"Katrina"	April 3, 2008	204
George Sr. and Barbara punish the Lil' Gang for destroying the White House by sending them to New Orleans to help with the rebuilding effort after Hurricane Katrina. They end up creating a surprise Mardi Gras float (out of a tank that was supposed to be a FEMA trailer and money that was being kept from the residents) trying to cheer up the residents. They instead crash into one of the levees and flood the city. Meanwhile George Sr. and Barbara cannot pay of the mortgages for the White House and look to sell it, with many of the Lil' Politicians looking to buy it. They eventually pay it off with all the money on the Mardi Gras float.
12	5	"Three Dates"	April 10, 2008	205
With the school dance coming up, Lil' George doesn't know whom to take. His brain advises him to be cautious, but George plows ahead and ends up inviting three dates. Once they get to the dance (featuring Good Charlotte as Good Charlotte cover band "Good Charlotter") George has to silence his brain once and for all. George Sr. is dealing with an annoying houseguest, King Fahd of Saudi Arabia, who parties like a frat guy and lords his oil over the president.
13	6	"Weekend at Saddamy's"	April 17, 2008	206
It's spring break, and Lil' George and the gang join George Sr. on a camping trip to Baghdad. Lil' George tries to impress his father and fix Iraq at the same time by digging up Saddam Hussein's body and turning him into a real puppet dictator, a la Weekend At Bernie's. Meanwhile, Lil' Bill Clinton convinces all the Lil' Democrats to spring break on South Padre island. When some of their antics end up on video, "Lil' Dems Gone Wild" becomes a top-selling DVD.
14	7	"Afghanistan"	April 24, 2008	207
When Osama bin Laden is diagnosed with a weak heart, he finds the only perfect match for a donor is Lil' Cheney. Al Qaeda kidnaps Lil' Cheney, forcing Lil' George and the gang to smoke him out of his hole in Afghanistan. Meanwhile, Barbara gets her groove back in Jamaica.
15	8	"Wedding"	May 1, 2008	208
When Lil' Bill Clinton invites Lil' George to his "Rainbow Party," Barbara and George realize he's growing up too fast. They decide the best way to preserve George's innocence is in a "purity wedding" in which he marries Barbara. When Lil' George decides his own father's a better match, they are forced to have a gay wedding, sending Barbara into the arms of super-smooth man-about-town Colin Powell.
16	9	"Pooty-Poot"	May 8, 2008	209
When Lil' Vladimir Putin and Lil' George start a schoolyard rivalry, it escalates to Lil' Putin poisoning Lil' George, whose head swells to five times its normal size. After some training from former wrestling champ Barbara Bush, Lil' George faces off against Lil' Putin in a classic playground battle. Meanwhile, Lil' Cheney has been partnered with Lil' Nancy Pelosi, and given a watermelon to care for as their child. When it becomes apparent that their watermelon is a lesbian, Lil' Cheney has some hard choices to make.
17	10	"Anthem / China"	May 15, 2008	210
The first story pits the Lil' Gang against the Lil' Dems in a battle of the bands for who can write the best new national anthem. Featuring a secret super-surprise awesome musical guest star. In the second, the Lil' Gang faces off against China, where they must win the Olympics to save America from being recalled by the Chinese.

== Critical response ==
The show has received mixed-to-negative reviews from critics. On the review aggregator website Rotten Tomatoes, 47% of 15 critics' reviews are positive, with an average rating of 5/10. The website's consensus reads: "Lil' Bush attempts to lampoon the 43rd President of the United States, but the animated series falters in its execution." Metacritic, which uses a weighted average, assigned the film a score of 31 out of 100, based on 10 critics, indicating "generally unfavorable" reviews.

A common complaint was that the show came too late in Bush's presidency to remain topical. Other complaints accused it of immaturity and lacking subtlety.

Not all the reviews, however, were negative. Among others, The Hollywood Reporter gave the show a positive review. A review from About.com cited the show's "cleverness and maturity," likening it to "a less bloody South Park".

== Home releases ==
Season	Number of episodes	Release date	Additional information
Season 1	7	March 11, 2008	The seventh unaired season finale
Season 2	10	October 14, 2008	

== See also ==
- That's My Bush!
- Our Cartoon President
