= Hilary Duff: This Is Now =

- Starring: Hilary Duff
- Country of origin: United States
- Original language: English
- No. of seasons: 1
- No. of episodes: 2

Production
- Executive producers: Rod Aissa; Fernando J. Hernandez
- Running time: 19–20 minutes
- Production company: MTV Series Entertainment

Original release
- Network: MTV
- Release: April 3 – April 9, 2007

Hilary Duff: This Is Now is a two-part MTV reality television series about singer Hilary Duff, broadcast in April 2007. It follows Duff during a promotional tour for her album Dignity in Spain, and her first performance of her single "With Love" in Europe. It shows Duff participating in photo shoots, her personal affairs, and interview segments. The first episode aired on April 3, and the second on April 9, 2007.

The show took sixty weeks to film, and an MTV crew followed Duff around, filming her preparations for the release of the Dignity album.
