= Nashville (2007 TV series) =

- Starring: Matt Jenkins; Lindsey Hager; Jeff Allen; Clint Moseley; Chuck Wicks; Rachel Bradshaw; Mika Combs; Sarah Gunsolus; Jamey Johnson
- Narrated by: Chris Parson
- Country of origin: United States
- Original language: English
- No. of seasons: 1
- No. of episodes: 6 (4 unaired)

Production
- Executive producers: Gary Auerbac; Julie Auerbach
- Running time: 44 minutes
- Production company: Go Go Luckey Productions

Original release
- Network: Fox
- Release: September 14 – September 21, 2007

Nashville is an American reality television/soap opera series featuring several aspiring country music artists. The show, which was based in Nashville, Tennessee, aired on Fox Broadcasting Company for two episodes prior to its cancellation.

== Reception ==
Nashville premiered on the Fox network on September 14, 2007 at 9/8c. The docu-soap did not fare well, with a total of 2.72 million viewers for a 1.7/3 (1,916,600 households, 3% of total watching) rating during its first telecast, and a 1.0/3 (1,310,500 18- to 49-year-olds watching) in the first half-hour and a 0.9/3 (1,179,450 18- to 49-year-olds watching) in the second half-hour in the 18–49 demo. This is lower than any show received in this time slot for Fox during the 2006–2007 TV season, including repeats.

In its second airing on September 21, the show received a rating of 1.3/3 (2.14 million viewers).

== Hiatus and cancellation ==
On September 24, 2007, Nashville was put on hiatus, and its place was filled by repeats of K-Ville, followed by three episodes of The Next Great American Band on October 19 and 26 and November 2. The show was initially scheduled to return November 9, but Fox subsequently decided to cancel the series. Though production was shut down, the show's producers unsuccessfully tried to sell the series to another channel.
