= The 5ive =

- Starring: Alesha Reneé
- Country of origin: United States

Production
- Running time: approx. 30 mins (per episode)

Original release
- Network: BET
- Release: June 4 – November 30, 2007

The 5ive is a television show that aired on BET. The show premiered on June 4, 2007, replacing Hotwyred. The show is hosted by Alesha Reneé, a winner in the "New Faces" contest. It is a half-hour show that counted down the five hottest people, places, events, gadgets, and websites. The last show aired on November 30, 2007.

== Episode 1 ==
(Originally aired: Monday June 18, 2007)

Show 101: Alesha Renee gives the scoop on the top 5 hottest people, places and gadgets.

- The 5: Hip Hop Skate Clubs
- The 4: Sex Tapes
- The 3: Naked Cabbie
- The 2: Sneaker Boutique
- The 1: Taalam Acey

== Episode 2 ==
(Originally aired: Wednesday June 20, 2007)

Show 102: Alesha Renee gives the scoop on the hottest things. Including old 1980s trends, the new iPhone and more.

- The 5: 80's Babies
- The 4: Apple iPhone
- The 3: imnotsigned.com
- The 2: Toccara Strut Your Stuff
- The 1: POW Magazine

== Episode 3 ==
(Originally aired: Monday June 25, 2007)

Show 103: Alesha Renee gives the scoop on the "5 hottest things right now" including a new dance and a new mobile device.

- The 5: Read A Book (Music Video)
- The 4: Aunt Jackie (Dance)
- The 3: Block Savvy (Website)
- The 2: Young, Black & Fabulous (Website)
- The 1: Helio Ocean (Mobile Device)

== Episode 4 ==
(Originally aired: Wednesday June 27, 2007)

Show 104: Alesha Renee gives the scoop on the five hottest things you should know about including an actress to watch for, and a new keyboard technology.

- The 5: Paula Patton
- The 4: Unique Cuts
- The 3: BlueTooth Laser Keyboard
- The 2: Naked Shopper
- The 1: Barack Obama
