= Hotwyred =

American television show

- Starring: Alesha Reneé; Lamorne Morris
- Country of origin: United States

Production
- Running time: approx. 30 mins (per episode)

Original release
- Network: BET
- Release: July 10, 2006 – May 25, 2007

Hotwyred is a television show that aired on BET. It debuted on July 10, 2006, replacing BET.com Countdown.

The show focused on technology and video gaming, in addition to the latest music videos.

The show was hosted by Lamorne Morris, and Alesha Reneé, winners from the BET "New Faces" search.

The last episode was aired on May 25, 2007. It was replaced by The 5ive.
