= American Body Shop =

American sitcom

- Genre: Sitcom
- Created by: Sam Greene
- Starring: Jill Bartlett; Frank Clem; John DiResta; Peter Hulne; Frank Merino; Tim Nichols; Nick Offerman
- Composers: Stephen Robert Phillips; Tim Paruszkiewicz
- Country of origin: United States
- Original language: English
- No. of seasons: 1
- No. of episodes: 10

Production
- Camera setup: Single-camera
- Running time: 30 minutes

Original release
- Network: Comedy Central
- Release: July 8 – September 17, 2007

American Body Shop is an American sitcom that aired on Comedy Central from July 8 until September 19, 2007 that revolves around a dysfunctional body shop in suburban Phoenix, Arizona and the accident-prone crew that works there.

The show came to Comedy Central after its creator, Sam Greene, shot the pilot on his own, put it on a DVD and mailed it to "the networks".

After only one season, the show was canceled.

== Cast ==
- Frank Merino as Luis
- Jill Bartlett as Denise
- Nick Offerman as Rob
- John DiResta as Johnny
- Peter Hulne as Sam
- Tim Nichols as Tim

== Episodes ==
No.	Title	Directed by	Written by	Original release date
1	"Flamers"	Unknown	Unknown	July 8, 2007
With the insurance inspectors threatening to take away their license, Sam has to hurry and get the shop up to code. This isn't an easy task with his stubborn miscreant employees. While Sam is struggling with the shop, Denise is hunting down car wrecks and planting sales material on the vehicles and their injured passengers.
2	"The Bishop and the Pawn"	Unknown	Unknown	July 15, 2007
Tim needs to deal with a Bishop's car, that has a dead body stuck in its windshield. Soon, the whole DBC crew gets involved into discarding the body.*
3	"Fluids"	Unknown	Unknown	July 22, 2007
The DBC crew have one week to get their shop up to speed again after they failed an EPA inspection. Some shop employees get involved in a pyramid scheme.
4	"Superquads"	Unknown	Unknown	July 29, 2007
The DBC crew face a new challenge when Denise comes up with the idea of modifying a quadriplegic's van so he can steer it with his mouth and big toe only - Rob's new project is born.
5	"Million Dollar Year"	Unknown	Unknown	August 5, 2007
DBC has a million-dollar year, but Sam does not share the profits with the rest of the team, causing them to strike, even though they are not in a union.
6	"Juicy Lou's"	Unknown	Unknown	August 19, 2007
After Juicy Lou runs a TV commercial that makes DBC look bad, Tim offers to hire Scott Bakula for a commercial of their own. However, Tim's Scott Bakula turns out to be a fraud. Sam's ex-girlfriend is released from prison and he thinks he might still have a chance with her.
7	"Stretchy Face"	Unknown	Unknown	August 27, 2007
The DBC crew has to deal with an unhappy and lonely client and a prostitute.
8	"The Gift"	Unknown	Unknown	September 3, 2007
Tim starts to think that he is able to paint the faces of recently departed people.
9	"Sam's Back"	Unknown	Unknown	September 10, 2007
Sam cannot watch over the shop due to a breakdancing accident that leaves him incapacitated.
10	"Shop for Sale"	Unknown	Unknown	September 17, 2007
Sam realizes his dream to hike the Appalachian Trail may be a little closer, when Juicy Lou shows up and offers to buy the shop. However, Sam's employees start to beat Juicy Lou's offer.
