= Welcome to the Parker =

- Genre: Reality television
- Country of origin: United States
- Original language: English
- No. of seasons: 1
- No. of episodes: 6

Production
- Executive producers: Belisa Balaban; Ted Skillman
- Running time: 42 minutes
- Production company: Snackaholic

Original release
- Network: Bravo
- Release: July 26 – August 30, 2007

Welcome to the Parker is an American reality television series on Bravo that premiered on July 26, 2007.

== Premise ==
The series follows the employees at the Parker Palm Springs hotel in Palm Springs, California.

== Cast ==
- Samir Chraibi, hotel manager
- Thomas Meding, general manager
- Michael Crawford, host of hotel restaurant, Mister Parker's
- John Federbusch, chef concierge
- Lynne Dibley, HR director
- Rocio Varela, executive chef
- Michael Twomey, catering sales manager
- Andrea Higgins, sales
- Nathaniel Lourn, room service waiter

== Episodes ==
No.	Title	Original release date
1	"Guess Who's Coming to (Criticize) Dinner?"	July 26, 2007
2	"Let Them Eat Tarts"	August 2, 2007
3	"Drag Queens and a Drama Queen"	August 9, 2007
4	"The Business of Pleasure"	August 16, 2007
5	"Making Up Is Hard to Do"	August 23, 2007
6	"Last Looks"	August 30, 2007
