= Turning Point (Chuck Wicks album) =

Studio album by Chuck Wicks
- Released: February 26, 2016
- Genre: Country
- Length: 40:00
- Label: Blaster
- Producer: Andy Dodd; Chuck Wicks

Chuck Wicks chronology
Starting Now (2008)	Turning Point (2016)

Singles from Turning Point
- 1. "Salt Life" Released: May 6, 2013; 2. "Us Again" Released: January 27, 2014; 3. "Saturday Afternoon" Released: September 29, 2014; 4. "I Don't Do Lonely Well" Released: 2015; 5. "She's Gone" Released: February 1, 2016

Turning Point is the second studio album by American country music artist Chuck Wicks. It was released on February 26, 2016 via Blaster Records. It includes the singles "Salt Life", "Us Again", "Saturday Afternoon", "I Don't Do Lonely Well" (which was previously recorded by Jason Aldean on his 2012 album, Night Train) and "She's Gone".

== Track listing ==
No.	Title	Writer(s)	Length
1.	"She's Gone"	Chuck Wicks, Brett Tyler, Jeffrey East	3:44
2.	"Fix Me"	Wicks, Amy Krechel, Angela Krechel, Courtney Krechel	3:43
3.	"Us Again"	Wicks, Tiffany Vartanyan, Andy Dodd	3:39
4.	"Whole Damn Thing"	Wicks, Liz Rose	4:00
5.	"Tell Me"	Wicks, Steph Jones, Dodd	4:01
6.	"Saturday Afternoon"	Wicks, Rodney Clawson, Chris Tompkins	3:43
7.	"I Don't Do Lonely Well"	Wicks, Tom Shapiro, Neil Thrasher	3:46
8.	"Salt Life"	Wicks, Michael Mobley, Vicky McGehee	3:15
9.	"Always"	Wicks, Emily Shackelton	3:27
10.	"Whatcha Got Girl"	Wicks, Neil Mason, Corey Crowder	3:01
11.	"Over You Gettin' Over Me"	Wicks, James T. Slater, Rachel Thibadeaux	3:41

== Chart performance ==
The album debuted at No. 12 on the Top Country Albums chart, selling 3,700 copies in its first week.

Chart (2016)	Peak position
US Billboard 200	167
US Top Country Albums (Billboard)	12
US Independent Albums (Billboard)	12

=== Singles ===
Year	Single	Peak chart positions	
Year	Single	US Country	US Country Airplay
2013	"Salt Life"	—	—
2014	"Us Again"	36	37
2014	"Saturday Afternoon"	—	—
2015	"I Don't Do Lonely Well"	—	—
2016	"She's Gone"	—	—
"—" denotes releases that did not chart
