= Jinx (clothing) =

American clothing line

- Type: Private
- Industry: Fashion Design
- Headquarters: San Diego, U.S.
- Area served: Worldwide
- Website: www.jinx.com

Jinx, stylized as J!NX, was a San Diego, California-based clothing brand started by Sean Gailey and Tim Norris in 1999 that created video game and other geek culture-themed apparel until its close in 2023.

== Early history ==
Jinx was started as a home business in 1999 by web developers Sean Gailey and Tim Norris. The company remained a side-project of the two founders until 2003, when they partnered with Jason Kraus and decided to work full-time, using video game themes for the majority of their pieces. The following year the company moved out of Gailey's bedroom and into their first office. Gailey describes the multiple themes that Jinx uses in its apparel as including, "video games, art, geek culture, Internet memes, giant robots, gadgets and comics."

== Jinx Clothing and Website ==
Jinx produced multiple official product lines, including products licensed to Blizzard Entertainment, Minecraft, Supercell, and Star Wars. The company hired gamers as its employees in order to remain closely linked to the video gaming community.

== Closure ==
In early November, 2022, Jinx announced the closure of its online website after 23 years in business.

On January 1, 2023, Jinx.com took down their online store and replaced it with a splash page containing a "thank you" video and message from Jinx.com CEO Sean Gailey.
