= 2005–06 United States network television schedule =

The 2005–06 network television schedule for the six major English language commercial broadcast networks in the United States covers the prime time hours from September 2005 to August 2006. The schedule is followed by a list per network of returning series, new series, and series canceled after the 2004–05 season.

This would be the final season of broadcasting for both UPN and The WB; their respective parent companies, CBS Corporation and Time Warner (now Paramount Skydance and Warner Bros. Discovery, respectively), would consolidate the two networks to form The CW the following season. It was also the final season in which Monday Night Football would be regularly broadcast on ABC; the long-running "game of the week" showcase would move to ESPN after the 2005 NFL season, following a 35-year run on ABC (which would resume airing MNF—albeit only for selected regular season and wild card games simulcast with ESPN—in 2021.) From February 10 to 26, 2006, NBC preempted its regular prime time schedule in order to air coverage of the 2006 Winter Olympics.

PBS is not included, as member television stations have local flexibility over most of their schedules and broadcast times for network shows may vary. i: Independent Television (renamed from its original brand, Pax TV, on July 1, and now known as Ion Television) is also not included since the network's schedule consisted mainly of syndicated reruns and movies.

Each of the 30 highest-rated shows released in May 2006 is listed with its rank and rating as determined by Nielsen Media Research.

New series to broadcast television are highlighted in bold. Repeat airings or same-day rebroadcasts are indicated by (R).

All times are U.S. Eastern and Pacific Time (except for some live sports or events). Subtract one hour for Central, Mountain, Alaska, and Hawaii–Aleutian times.

All sporting events air live in all time zones in U.S. Eastern time, with local and/or late night programming scheduled by affiliates after game completion.

== Legend ==
- Light blue indicates local programming.
- Gray indicates encore programming.
- Blue-gray indicates news programming.
- Light green indicates sporting events.
- Red indicates series being burned off and other regularly scheduled programs, including specials and movies.
- Bronze indicates reruns of programming that originally aired on a cable channel.
- highlight Yellow highlights indicates the top-10 most watched programs of the season.
- highlight Cyan highlights indicates numbers 11-20 most watched programs of the season.
- highlight Magenta highlights indicates numbers 21-30 most watched programs of the season.
- highlight Highlights indicates that it falls in multiple of the above categories.

== Sunday ==
| Network | | 7:00 p.m. | 7:30 p.m. | 8:00 p.m. | 8:30 p.m. | 9:00 p.m. | 9:30 p.m. | 10:00 p.m. | 10:30 p.m. |
|---|---|---|---|---|---|---|---|---|---|
| ABC | | America's Funniest Home Videos | | Extreme Makeover: Home Edition (23/8.6) | | Desperate Housewives (4/13.8) | | Grey's Anatomy (5/12.5) | |
| CBS | Fall | 60 Minutes (21/9.0) (Tied with Deal or No Deal) | | Cold Case (17/9.3) | | CBS Sunday Movie | | | |
| CBS | Summer | 60 Minutes (21/9.0) (Tied with Deal or No Deal) | | Big Brother | | Cold Case (R) | | Without a Trace (R) | |
| Fox | Fall | **The OT** | King of the Hill | The Simpsons | **The War at Home** | Family Guy | American Dad! | Local programming | |
| Fox | Winter | Malcolm in the Middle | King of the Hill | The Simpsons | **The War at Home** | Family Guy | American Dad! | Local programming | |
| Fox | Late winter | Malcolm in the Middle | King of the Hill | The Simpsons | **The War at Home** | Family Guy | **Free Ride** | Local programming | |
| Fox | Spring | Malcolm in the Middle | King of the Hill | The Simpsons | **The War at Home** | Family Guy | American Dad! | Local programming | |
| Fox | Summer | Malcolm in the Middle | King of the Hill | The Simpsons | American Dad! (R) | Family Guy | **The War at Home** (R) | Local programming | |
| NBC | Fall | Dateline NBC | | The West Wing | | Law & Order: Criminal Intent | | Crossing Jordan | |
| NBC | Spring | Dateline NBC | | | | Law & Order: Criminal Intent | | Crossing Jordan | |
| The WB | Fall | Reba (R) | | Charmed | | Blue Collar TV | Blue Collar TV (R) | Local programming | |
| The WB | Mid-fall | Reba (R) | | Charmed | | Supernatural (R) | | Local programming | |
| The WB | Winter | Reba (R) | | Charmed | | Charmed (R) | | Local programming | |
| The WB | Summer | **Just Legal** | | Charmed | | Charmed (R) | | Local programming | |

Notes:

- On September 17, 2006, The WB aired The Night of Favorites and Farewells starting at 5:00 p.m. ET. The special included the pilot episodes of Felicity, Angel, Buffy the Vampire Slayer, and Dawson's Creek. The special served as the network's last nationally scheduled broadcast.

== Monday ==
| Network | | 8:00 p.m. | 8:30 p.m. | 9:00 p.m. | 9:30 p.m. | 10:00 p.m. | 10:30 p.m. |
|---|---|---|---|---|---|---|---|
| ABC | Fall | Wife Swap | | Monday Night Football (continued to game completion) (9/10.6) (Tied with House) | | | |
| ABC | Winter | Wife Swap | | The Bachelor | | | |
| ABC | Late winter | Wife Swap | | Supernanny | | **Miracle Workers** | |
| ABC | Spring | Wife Swap | | Supernanny | | **What About Brian** | |
| ABC | Late spring | Wife Swap | | Supernanny | | **How to Get the Guy** | |
| ABC | Summer | Wife Swap (R) | | | | Supernanny (R) | |
| CBS | Fall | The King of Queens | **How I Met Your Mother** | Two and a Half Men (13/9.7) (Tied with The Unit) | **Out of Practice** (30/7.8) | CSI: Miami (8/11.8) | |
| CBS | Winter | The King of Queens | **How I Met Your Mother** | Two and a Half Men (13/9.7) (Tied with The Unit) | **Courting Alex** | CSI: Miami (8/11.8) | |
| CBS | Late winter | The King of Queens | **How I Met Your Mother** | Two and a Half Men (13/9.7) (Tied with The Unit) | **The New Adventures of Old Christine** (25/8.3) (Tied with Unan1mous) | CSI: Miami (8/11.8) | |
| CBS | Summer | The King of Queens | **How I Met Your Mother** | Two and a Half Men (13/9.7) (Tied with The Unit) | **How I Met Your Mother** (R) | CSI: Miami (8/11.8) | |
| CBS | Mid-summer | Two and a Half Men (R) | **How I Met Your Mother** | Two and a Half Men (13/9.7) (Tied with The Unit) | **The New Adventures of Old Christine** (R) | CSI: Miami (8/11.8) | |
| Fox | Fall | Arrested Development | **Kitchen Confidential** | **Prison Break** | | Local programming | |
| Fox | Mid-fall | **Prison Break** (R) | | **Prison Break** | | Local programming | |
| Fox | Late fall | Arrested Development | | Nanny 911 | | Local programming | |
| Fox | Winter | **Skating with Celebrities** | | 24 (28/8.1) (Tied with ER) | | Local programming | |
| Fox | Late winter | **Prison Break** | | 24 (28/8.1) (Tied with ER) | | Local programming | |
| Fox | Spring | Hell's Kitchen (R) | | Hell's Kitchen | | Local programming | |
| NBC | Fall | **Surface** | | Las Vegas | | Medium | |
| NBC | Winter | **Deal or No Deal** (15/9.6) (Tied with Dancing with the Stars) | | The Apprentice | | Medium | |
| NBC | Spring | **Deal or No Deal** (15/9.6) (Tied with Dancing with the Stars) | | The Apprentice | | Medium | |
| NBC | Summer | **Treasure Hunters** (R) | | **Treasure Hunters** | | Medium | |
| NBC | Mid-summer | Various programming | | **Treasure Hunters** | | Medium | |
| UPN | | One on One | All of Us | Girlfriends | Half & Half | Local programming | |
| The WB | Fall | 7th Heaven | | **Just Legal** | | Local programming | |
| The WB | Mid-fall | 7th Heaven | | **Related** | | Local programming | |
| The WB | Spring | 7th Heaven | | Everwood | | Local programming | |
| The WB | Summer | 7th Heaven (R) | | | | Local programming | |

Notes:

- **Emily's Reasons Why Not** and Jake in Progress premiered on ABC on January 9, 2006, at 8:00 and 8:30 p.m. respectively, and were removed from the schedule after airing one episode.
- **One Ocean View** premiered on ABC on July 31, 2006, at 10 p.m. and was removed from the schedule after airing two episodes.

== Tuesday ==
| Network | | 8:00 p.m. | 8:30 p.m. | 9:00 p.m. | 9:30 p.m. | 10:00 p.m. | 10:30 p.m. |
|---|---|---|---|---|---|---|---|
| ABC | Fall | According to Jim | Rodney | **Commander in Chief** (24/8.4) | | Boston Legal | |
| ABC | Spring | According to Jim | Hope & Faith | **Sons & Daughters** | | Boston Legal | |
| ABC | Mid-Spring | According to Jim | Hope & Faith | | Less than Perfect | Boston Legal | |
| ABC | Summer | George Lopez (R) | | | | **Primetime: The Outsiders** | |
| CBS | Fall | NCIS (12/9.8) | | The Amazing Race: Family Edition | | **Close to Home** | |
| CBS | Mid-fall | NCIS (12/9.8) | | The Amazing Race: Family Edition | | Various programming | |
| CBS | Winter | NCIS (12/9.8) | | Various programming | | **Love Monkey** | |
| CBS | Late winter | NCIS (12/9.8) | | **The Unit** (13/9.7) (Tied with Two and a Half Men) | | The Amazing Race | |
| CBS | Summer | Big Brother | | Rock Star | | 48 Hours (R) | |
| Fox | Fall | **Bones** | | House (9/10.6) (Tied with Monday Night Football) | | Local programming | |
| Fox | Winter | American Idol (1/17.6) | | House (9/10.6) (Tied with Monday Night Football) | | Local programming | |
| Fox | Spring | House (R) | | | | Local programming | |
| NBC | Fall | The Biggest Loser | | **My Name Is Earl** | The Office | Law & Order: Special Victims Unit (18/9.2) (Tied with Lost and CSI: NY) | |
| NBC | Winter | Fear Factor | | Scrubs | | Law & Order: Special Victims Unit (18/9.2) (Tied with Lost and CSI: NY) | |
| NBC | Spring | Most Outrageous Moments | Scrubs (R) | Scrubs | **Teachers** | Law & Order: Special Victims Unit (18/9.2) (Tied with Lost and CSI: NY) | |
| NBC | Late spring | Fear Factor | | Last Comic Standing | | Law & Order: Special Victims Unit (18/9.2) (Tied with Lost and CSI: NY) | |
| UPN | Fall | America's Next Top Model (R) | | **Sex, Love & Secrets** | | Local programming | |
| UPN | Mid-fall | America's Next Top Model (R) | | Various programming | | Local programming | |
| UPN | Winter | America's Next Top Model (R) | | Veronica Mars | | Local programming | |
| UPN | Summer | Veronica Mars (R) | | | | Local programming | |
| The WB | Fall | Gilmore Girls | | **Supernatural** | | Local programming | |
| The WB | Spring | Gilmore Girls | | **Pepper Dennis** | | Local programming | |
| The WB | Summer | Gilmore Girls (R) | | | | Local programming | |

Notes:

- **Get This Party Started** premiered on UPN on February 7, 2006, at 9:00 p.m. and was removed from the schedule after airing two episodes.
- **Tuesday Night Book Club** premiered on CBS on June 13, 2006, at 10:00 p.m. and was removed from the schedule after airing two episodes.

== Wednesday ==
| Network | | 8:00 p.m. | 8:30 p.m. | 9:00 p.m. | 9:30 p.m. | 10:00 p.m. | 10:30 p.m. |
|---|---|---|---|---|---|---|---|
| ABC | Fall | George Lopez | **Freddie** | Lost (18/9.2) (Tied with CSI: NY and Law & Order: Special Victims Unit) | | **Invasion** | |
| ABC | Spring | George Lopez | **Freddie** | Lost (18/9.2) (Tied with CSI: NY and Law & Order: Special Victims Unit) | | **The Evidence** | |
| ABC | Mid-spring | Alias | | Lost (18/9.2) (Tied with CSI: NY and Law & Order: Special Victims Unit) | | **Invasion** | |
| ABC | Late spring | George Lopez (R) | **Freddie** (R) | Lost (18/9.2) (Tied with CSI: NY and Law & Order: Special Victims Unit) | | **Commander in Chief** | |
| ABC | Summer | George Lopez (R) | **Freddie** (R) | Lost (R) | | | |
| ABC | Mid-summer | George Lopez (R) | | | | **Primetime: Medical Mysteries** | |
| CBS | Fall | Still Standing | Yes, Dear | **Criminal Minds** (27/8.2) | | CSI: NY (18/9.2) (Tied with Lost and Law & Order: Special Victims Unit) | |
| CBS | Spring | The Amazing Race | | **Criminal Minds** (27/8.2) | | CSI: NY (18/9.2) (Tied with Lost and Law & Order: Special Victims Unit) | |
| CBS | Summer | Rock Star | | **Criminal Minds** (27/8.2) | | CSI: NY (18/9.2) (Tied with Lost and Law & Order: Special Victims Unit) | |
| Fox | Fall | MLB on Fox | | | | | |
| Fox | Mid-fall | That '70s Show | Stacked | Trading Spouses: Meet Your New Mommy | | Local programming | |
| Fox | Winter | American Idol (2/17.2) | | **Bones** | | Local programming | |
| Fox | Spring | **Bones** | | American Idol (2/17.2) | **Unan1mous** (25/8.3) (Tied with The New Adventures of Old Christine) | Local programming | |
| Fox | Late spring | So You Think You Can Dance | | | | Local programming | |
| NBC | Fall | **The Apprentice: Martha Stewart** | | **E-Ring** | | Law & Order | |
| NBC | Mid-fall | **E-Ring** | | **The Apprentice: Martha Stewart** | | Law & Order | |
| NBC | Winter | **E-Ring** | | The Biggest Loser | | Law & Order | |
| NBC | Late winter | The Biggest Loser | | Law & Order (R) | | Law & Order | |
| NBC | Spring | **Deal or No Deal** (21/9.0) (Tied with 60 Minutes) | | Law & Order | | **Heist** | |
| NBC | Mid-spring | **Deal or No Deal** (21/9.0) (Tied with 60 Minutes) | | **Heist** | | Law & Order | |
| NBC | Late spring | **Deal or No Deal** (21/9.0) (Tied with 60 Minutes) | | Dateline NBC | | Law & Order | |
| NBC | Summer | **America's Got Talent** | | | | Law & Order | |
| UPN | Fall | America's Next Top Model | | Veronica Mars | | Local programming | |
| UPN | Winter | **South Beach** | | Veronica Mars | | Local programming | |
| UPN | Spring | America's Next Top Model | | Veronica Mars | | Local programming | |
| UPN | Late spring | UPN Wednesday Night Movie | | | | Local programming | |
| UPN | Summer | America's Next Top Model (R) | | Eve (R) | Cuts (R) | Local programming | |
| The WB | Fall | One Tree Hill | | **Related** | | Local programming | |
| The WB | Winter | One Tree Hill | | Beauty and the Geek (R) | | Local programming | |
| The WB | Spring | One Tree Hill | | **The Bedford Diaries** | | Local programming | |
| The WB | Summer | Blue Collar TV (R) | | One Tree Hill (R) | | Local programming | |

== Thursday ==
| Network | | 8:00 p.m. | 8:30 p.m. | 9:00 p.m. | 9:30 p.m. | 10:00 p.m. | 10:30 p.m. |
|---|---|---|---|---|---|---|---|
| ABC | Fall | Alias | | **Night Stalker** | | Primetime | |
| ABC | Late fall | ABC Thursday Night Movie | | | | Primetime | |
| ABC | Winter | Dancing with the Stars (7/12.0) | | | **Crumbs** | Primetime | |
| ABC | Late winter | Extreme Makeover: Home Edition | | **American Inventor** | | Primetime | |
| ABC | Spring | **American Inventor** | | | | **Commander in Chief** (24/8.4) | |
| ABC | Summer | **Master of Champions** | | Grey's Anatomy (R) | | Primetime | |
| ABC | Mid-summer | Grey's Anatomy (R) | | | | Primetime | |
| CBS | Fall | Survivor: Guatemala – The Maya Empire (11/10.3) | | CSI: Crime Scene Investigation (3/15.6) | | Without a Trace (6/12.3) | |
| CBS | Winter | Various programming | | CSI: Crime Scene Investigation (3/15.6) | | Without a Trace (6/12.3) | |
| CBS | Mid-winter | Survivor: Panama – Exile Island (11/10.3) | | CSI: Crime Scene Investigation (3/15.6) | | Without a Trace (6/12.3) | |
| CBS | Spring | **Gameshow Marathon** | | CSI: Crime Scene Investigation (3/15.6) | | Without a Trace (6/12.3) | |
| CBS | Summer | Big Brother | | CSI: Crime Scene Investigation (3/15.6) | | Without a Trace (6/12.3) | |
| Fox | Fall | The O.C. | | **Reunion** | | Local programming | |
| Fox | Winter | That '70s Show | That '70s Show (R) | The O.C. | | Local programming | |
| Fox | Late winter | That '70s Show | **The Loop** | The O.C. | | Local programming | |
| Fox | Spring | That '70s Show | | The O.C. | | Local programming | |
| Fox | Late spring | That '70s Show | | So You Think You Can Dance | | Local programming | |
| NBC | Fall | Joey | Will & Grace | The Apprentice | | ER (28/8.1) (Tied with 24) | |
| NBC | Winter | Will & Grace | **Four Kings** | **My Name Is Earl** | The Office | ER (28/8.1) (Tied with 24) | |
| NBC | Spring | Will & Grace | **My Name Is Earl** (R) | **My Name Is Earl** | The Office | ER (28/8.1) (Tied with 24) | |
| NBC | Summer | **My Name Is Earl** (R) | The Office (R) | **My Name Is Earl** | The Office | **Windfall** | |
| NBC | Mid-summer | **My Name Is Earl** (R) | The Office (R) | **America's Got Talent** | | **Windfall** | |
| UPN | | **Everybody Hates Chris** | **Love, Inc.** | Eve | Cuts | Local programming | |
| The WB | Fall | Smallville | | Everwood | | Local programming | |
| The WB | Winter | Smallville | | Beauty and the Geek | | Local programming | |
| The WB | Spring | Smallville | | **Supernatural** | | Local programming | |

== Friday ==
| Network | | 8:00 p.m. | 8:30 p.m. | 9:00 p.m. | 9:30 p.m. | 10:00 p.m. | 10:30 p.m. |
|---|---|---|---|---|---|---|---|
| ABC | Fall | Supernanny | | Hope & Faith | **Hot Properties** | 20/20 | |
| ABC | Winter | Dancing with the Stars (15/9.6) (Tied with Deal or No Deal) | | **In Justice** | | 20/20 | |
| ABC | Late winter | America's Funniest Home Videos (R) | | **In Justice** | | 20/20 | |
| ABC | Spring | America's Funniest Home Videos (R) | | | | 20/20 | |
| ABC | Late spring | America's Funniest Home Videos (R) | | Hope & Faith (R) | | 20/20 | |
| ABC | Summer | America's Funniest Home Videos (R) | | **Kyle XY** (R) | | 20/20 | |
| CBS | Fall | **Ghost Whisperer** | | **Threshold** | | Numbers | |
| CBS | Late fall | **Ghost Whisperer** | | **Close to Home** | | Numbers | |
| CBS | Summer | NCIS (R) | | **The Unit** (R) | | Numbers | |
| Fox | Fall | The Bernie Mac Show | Malcolm in the Middle | **Killer Instinct** | | Local programming | |
| Fox | Winter | The Bernie Mac Show | Malcolm in the Middle | Trading Spouses: Meet Your New Mommy | | Local programming | |
| Fox | Mid-winter | The Bernie Mac Show | The Bernie Mac Show (R) | Trading Spouses: Meet Your New Mommy | | Local programming | |
| Fox | Late winter | Nanny 911 | | Trading Spouses: Meet Your New Mommy | | Local programming | |
| Fox | Spring | The Bernie Mac Show | | Trading Spouses: Meet Your New Mommy | | Local programming | |
| Fox | Mid-spring | Fox Friday Night Movie | | | | Local programming | |
| Fox | Summer | 24 (R) | | | | Local programming | |
| Fox | Mid-summer | That '70s Show (R) | | 24 (R) | | Local programming | |
| Fox | Late summer | Fox Friday Night Movie | | | | Local programming | |
| NBC | Fall | Dateline NBC | | **Three Wishes** | | Law & Order: Criminal Intent (R) | |
| NBC | Winter | Most Outrageous Moments | Most Outrageous Moments (R) | Dateline NBC | | **The Book of Daniel** | |
| NBC | Mid-winter | Most Outrageous Moments | Most Outrageous Moments (R) | Dateline NBC | | | |
| NBC | Late winter | **Deal or No Deal** | | Las Vegas | | **Conviction** | |
| NBC | Spring | Dateline NBC | | Las Vegas | | Law & Order: Special Victims Unit (R) | |
| NBC | Summer | Dateline NBC | | Las Vegas | | Law & Order (R) | |
| UPN | | WWE Friday Night SmackDown! | | | | Local programming | |
| The WB | Fall | What I Like About You | **Twins** | Reba | Living with Fran | Local programming | |
| The WB | Mid-fall | What I Like About You | Living with Fran | Reba | **Twins** | Local programming | |
| The WB | Spring | **Survival of the Richest** | | Reba | **Modern Men** | Local programming | |
| The WB | Late spring | What I Like About You (R) | **Twins** (R) | Reba | Living with Fran (R) | Local programming | |

Notes:

- **Inconceivable** premiered on NBC on September 23, 2005, at 10:00 p.m. and was removed from the schedule after airing two episodes.

== Saturday ==
| Network | | 8:00 p.m. | 8:30 p.m. | 9:00 p.m. | 9:30 p.m. | 10:00 p.m. | 10:30 p.m. |
|---|---|---|---|---|---|---|---|
| ABC | Fall | Lost (R) | | **Invasion** (R) | | **Commander in Chief** (R) | |
| ABC | Mid-fall | ABC Saturday Movie of the Week | | | | Desperate Housewives (R) | |
| ABC | Late fall | America's Funniest Home Videos (R) | | ABC Saturday Movie of the Week | | | |
| ABC | Winter | ABC Saturday Movie of the Week | | | | | |
| ABC | Spring | The Wonderful World of Disney | | | | **The Evidence** | |
| ABC | Summer | ABC Saturday Movie of the Week | | | | | |
| CBS | | Crimetime Saturday | | | | 48 Hours | |
| Fox | | COPS | COPS (R) | America's Most Wanted | | Local programming | |
| NBC | Fall | NBC Saturday Night Movie | | | | Law & Order: Special Victims Unit (R) | |
| NBC | Winter | Dateline NBC | | Law & Order: Special Victims Unit (R) | | **Conviction** (R) | |
| NBC | Spring | Dateline NBC | | Law & Order: Special Victims Unit (R) | | Law & Order: Criminal Intent (R) | |

== By network ==
=== ABC ===
Returning series:

- 20/20
- ABC Thursday Night Movie
- ABC Saturday Movie of the Week
- According to Jim
- America's Funniest Home Videos
- Alias
- The Bachelor
- Boston Legal
- Dancing with the Stars
- Desperate Housewives
- Extreme Makeover: Home Edition
- George Lopez
- Grey's Anatomy
- Hope & Faith
- Jake in Progress
- Less than Perfect
- Lost
- Monday Night Football
- Primetime
- Rodney
- Supernanny
- Wife Swap
- The Wonderful World of Disney

New series:

- **American Inventor**
- **Commander in Chief**
- **Crumbs**
- **Emily's Reasons Why Not**
- **The Evidence**
- **Freddie**
- **Hot Properties**
- **How to Get the Guy**
- **In Justice**
- **Invasion**
- **Kyle XY** (Note: An ABC Family original series; airs repeats.)
- **Master of Champions**
- **Miracle Workers**
- **Night Stalker**
- **The One: Making a Music Star**
- **One Ocean View**
- **Sons & Daughters**
- **What About Brian**

Not returning from 2004–05:

- 8 Simple Rules
- The ABC Monday Night Movie
- The Bachelorette (revived and returned for 2007–08)
- The Benefactor
- Blind Justice
- Complete Savages
- Extreme Makeover
- Eyes
- Life as We Know It
- Life of Luxury
- My Wife and Kids
- NYPD Blue

=== CBS ===
Returning series:

- 48 Hours
- 60 Minutes
- The Amazing Race
- Big Brother
- CBS Sunday Movie
- Cold Case
- CSI: Crime Scene Investigation
- CSI: Miami
- CSI: NY
- The King of Queens
- NCIS
- Numbers
- Still Standing
- Survivor
- Two and a Half Men
- Without a Trace
- Yes, Dear

New series:

- **Close to Home**
- **Courting Alex**
- **Criminal Minds**
- **Gameshow Marathon**
- **Ghost Whisperer**
- **How I Met Your Mother**
- **Love Monkey**
- **The New Adventures of Old Christine**
- **Out of Practice**
- **Threshold**
- **Tuesday Night Book Club**
- **The Unit**

Not returning from 2004–05:

- Center of the Universe
- Clubhouse
- Dr. Vegas
- Everybody Loves Raymond
- JAG
- Joan of Arcadia
- Judging Amy
- Listen Up
- Wickedly Perfect
- The Will

=== Fox ===
Returning series:

- 24
- America's Most Wanted
- American Dad!
- American Idol
- Arrested Development
- The Bernie Mac Show
- Cops
- Family Guy
- Fox Friday Night Movie
- Hell's Kitchen
- House
- King of the Hill
- Malcolm in the Middle
- MLB on Fox
- Nanny 911
- The O.C.
- The Simpsons
- So You Think You Can Dance
- Stacked
- That '70s Show
- Trading Spouses

New series:

- **Bones**
- **Free Ride**
- **Head Cases**
- **Killer Instinct**
- **Kitchen Confidential**
- **The Loop**
- **The OT**
- **Prison Break**
- **Reunion**
- **Skating with Celebrities**
- **Unan1mous**
- **The War at Home**

Not returning from 2004–05:

- The Inside
- Jonny Zero
- Life on a Stick
- Method & Red
- My Big Fat Obnoxious Boss
- North Shore
- Point Pleasant
- Quintuplets
- The Rebel Billionaire: Branson's Quest for the Best
- Renovate My Family
- The Simple Life
- The Sketch Show
- Totally Outrageous Behavior
- Tru Calling (revived by Syfy in 2008)
- Who's Your Daddy?
- World's Craziest Videos

=== NBC ===
Returning series:

- The Apprentice
- The Biggest Loser
- The Contender
- Crossing Jordan
- Dateline NBC
- ER
- Fear Factor
- Joey
- Las Vegas
- Last Comic Standing
- Law & Order
- Law & Order: Special Victims Unit
- Law & Order: Criminal Intent
- Law & Order: Trial by Jury
- Medium
- Most Outrageous Moments
- The Office
- Scrubs
- The West Wing
- Will & Grace

New series:

- **America's Got Talent**
- **The Apprentice: Martha Stewart**
- **The Book of Daniel**
- **Celebrity Cooking Showdown**
- **Conviction**
- **Deal or No Deal**
- **E-Ring**
- **Four Kings**
- **Heist**
- **Inconceivable**
- **My Name Is Earl**
- **Surface**
- **Teachers**
- **Three Wishes**
- **Treasure Hunters**
- **Windfall**

Not returning from 2004–05:

- American Dreams
- Committed
- Father of the Pride
- Hawaii
- LAX
- Medical Investigation
- Revelations
- Third Watch

=== UPN ===
Returning series:

- All of Us
- America's Next Top Model
- Cuts
- Eve
- Girlfriends
- Half & Half
- One on One
- UPN Wednesday Night Movie
- Veronica Mars
- WWE SmackDown!

New series:

- **Everybody Hates Chris**
- **Get This Party Started**
- **Love, Inc.**
- **Sex, Love & Secrets**
- **South Beach**

Not returning from 2004–05:

- The Bad Girl's Guide
- Britney and Kevin: Chaotic
- Kevin Hill
- The Road to Stardom with Missy Elliott
- R U the Girl with T-Boz & Chilli
- Second Time Around
- Star Trek: Enterprise

=== The WB ===
Returning series:

- 7th Heaven
- Beauty and the Geek
- Blue Collar TV
- Charmed
- Everwood
- Gilmore Girls
- Living With Fran
- One Tree Hill
- Reba
- Smallville
- What I Like About You

New series:

- **The Bedford Diaries**
- **Just Legal**
- **Misconceptions**
- **Modern Men**
- **Pepper Dennis**
- **Related**
- **Supernatural**
- **Survival of the Richest**
- **Twins**

Not returning from 2004–05:

- Big Man on Campus
- Commando Nanny
- Drew Carey's Green Screen Show
- Grounded for Life
- High School Reunion
- Jack & Bobby
- The Mountain
- The Starlet
- Steve Harvey's Big Time
- Summerland

== Renewals and cancellations ==
=== Renewals ===
==== ABC ====
- Boston Legal—Renewed for a third season on May 3, 2006.
- Dancing with the Stars—Renewed for a third and fourth seasons.
- Desperate Housewives—Renewed for a third season.
- Extreme Makeover: Home Edition—Renewed for a fourth season.
- Grey's Anatomy—Renewed for a third season.
- Lost—Renewed for a third season.

==== CBS ====
- Close to Home—Renewed for a second season.
- Criminal Minds—Renewed for a second season.
- CSI: Crime Scene Investigation—Renewed for a seventh season.
- CSI: Miami—Renewed for a fifth season.
- CSI: NY—Renewed for a third season.
- Ghost Whisperer—Renewed for a second season.
- How I Met Your Mother—Renewed for a second season.
- NCIS—Renewed for a fourth season.
- The New Adventures of Old Christine—Renewed for a second season.
- Numb3rs—Renewed for a third season.
- Two and a Half Men—Renewed for a fourth season.

==== Fox ====
- American Dad!—Renewed for a second season.
- Bones—Renewed for a second season.
- Family Guy—Renewed for a fifth season.
- House—Renewed for a third season.
- Prison Break—Renewed for a second season.
- The Simpsons—Renewed for an eighteenth season.
- The War at Home—Renewed for a second season.

==== NBC ====
- The Biggest Loser—Renewed for a third season.
- ER—Renewed for a thirteenth season.
- Law & Order: Criminal Intent—Renewed for a sixth season.
- Law & Order: Special Victims Unit—Renewed for an eighth season.
- My Name Is Earl—Renewed for a second season.
- Law & Order—Renewed for a seventeenth season.
- The Office—Renewed for a third season.

==== UPN ====
- All of Us—Renewed for a fourth season and moving to The CW.
- America's Next Top Model—Renewed for a seventh and eighth seasons and moving to The CW.
- Everybody Hates Chris—Renewed for a second season and moving to The CW.
- Girlfriends—Renewed for a seventh season and moving to The CW.
- Veronica Mars—Renewed for a third season and moving to The CW.

==== The WB ====
- 7th Heaven—Renewed for an eleventh season and moving to The CW.
- Gilmore Girls—Renewed for a seventh season and moving to The CW.
- One Tree Hill—Renewed for a fourth season and moving to The CW.
- Reba—Renewed for a sixth season and moving to The CW.
- Smallville—Renewed for a sixth season and moving to The CW.
- Supernatural—Renewed for a second season and moving to The CW.

=== Cancellations and series endings ===
==== ABC ====
- Alias—The series concluded on May 22, 2006.
- Commander in Chief—Canceled after one season.
- Crumbs—Canceled after one season.
- Emily's Reasons Why Not—Canceled after one episode due to low ratings.
- The Evidence—Canceled after one season.
- Freddie—Canceled after one season. The series concluded on May 31, 2006.
- Hope & Faith—Ended after three seasons.
- Hot Properties—Canceled after one season.
- How to Get the Guy
- In Justice—Canceled after one season.
- Invasion—Canceled after one season.
- Jake in Progress—Canceled after two seasons.
- Less than Perfect—Ended after four seasons.
- Master of Champions
- Miracle Workers
- Night Stalker—Canceled after one season.
- The One: Making a Music Star
- One Ocean View
- Rodney—Canceled after two seasons.
- Sons & Daughters—Canceled after one season.

==== CBS ====
- Courting Alex—Canceled after one season.
- CBS Sunday Movie—Cancelled on May 17, 2006.
- Gameshow Marathon
- Love Monkey—Canceled by CBS after three episodes. The last five unaired episodes aired from April 18, 2006, until May 16, 2006, on VH1.
- Out of Practice—Canceled after one season.
- Still Standing—Ended after four seasons.
- Threshold—Canceled after one season.
- Tuesday Night Book Club
- Yes, Dear—Ended after six seasons.

==== Fox ====
- Arrested Development—In March 2006, it was revealed the series was cancelled. The series was later revived in 2013 on Netflix.
- The Bernie Mac Show—Ended after five seasons. Bernie Mac died on August 9, 2008, at the age of 50.
- Free Ride—Canceled after one season.
- Head Cases—Canceled after one season.
- Killer Instinct—Canceled after one season.
- Kitchen Confidential—Canceled after one season.
- Malcolm in the Middle—Ended after seven seasons.
- Reunion—On November 29, 2005, it was announced Fox was not ordering any additional episodes, essentially cancelling it.
- Skating with Celebrities
- Stacked—Canceled after two seasons.
- That '70s Show—It was announced on January 17, 2006, that season eight would be the final season. The series concluded on May 18, 2006.
- Unan1mous

==== NBC ====
- The Book of Daniel—Canceled after one season.
- Celebrity Cooking Showdown
- Conviction—Canceled after one season.
- E-Ring—Canceled after one season.
- Fear Factor—Cancelled in May 2006. It was later revived in 2011.
- Four Kings—Canceled after one season.
- Heist—Canceled after one season.
- Inconceivable—Canceled after one season.
- Joey—Canceled after two seasons.
- Law & Order: Trial By Jury—The final episode aired on January 21, 2006, on Court TV.
- Surface—Canceled after one season.
- Teachers—Canceled after one season.
- Thick & Thin—It was announced that the show will not air on NBC.
- Three Wishes
- Treasure Hunters
- The West Wing—Ended after seven seasons.
- Will & Grace—Revived in January 2017.
- Windfall

==== UPN ====
- Cuts—Canceled after two seasons.
- Eve—Ended after three seasons.
- Get This Party Started
- Half & Half—Ended after four seasons.
- Love, Inc.—Canceled after one season.
- One on One—Ended after five seasons.
- Sex, Love & Secrets—Canceled after one season.
- South Beach—Canceled after one season.

==== The WB ====
- The Bedford Diaries—Canceled after one season.
- Blue Collar TV—Canceled after two seasons.
- Charmed—Ended after eight seasons.
- Everwood—Ended after four seasons.
- Just Legal—Canceled after one season. The series concluded on September 10, 2006.
- Living with Fran—Canceled after two seasons.
- Misconceptions
- Modern Men—Canceled after one season.
- Pepper Dennis—Canceled after one season. The series concluded on July 4, 2006.
- Related—Canceled after one season.
- Survival of the Richest
- Twins—Canceled after one season.
- What I Like About You—Ended after four seasons.
