= Livin' on the Run =

Studio album by Scott Grimes
- Released: February 25, 2005
- Recorded: Capitol Studios
- Genre: Rock, soft rock
- Label: Velocity Records
- Producer: Tom Fletcher & Scott Grimes

Scott Grimes chronology
Scott Grimes (1989)	Livin' on the Run (2005)	Drive (2010)

Professional ratings
Review scores
Source	Rating
AllMusic	link

Livin' on the Run is the second album by actor/singer/songwriter Scott Grimes. Released in early 2005, it produced the single "Sunset Blvd", which peaked at number 18 on Billboard’s Adult Contemporary chart in April 2005.

== History ==
After 16 years between albums (his first release was the 1989 A&M album Scott Grimes), Grimes released this collection of material. Most of the songs were written years prior to the album's release. Grimes' career as an actor kept him busy with little time to pursue his first love of music. The album was recorded with L.A.-area studio musicians and would go on to become more successful than his debut record.

== Track listing ==
No.	Title	Writer(s)	Length
1.	"Livin' on the Run"	Scott Grimes; Jay Gore; Rico Belled	6:14
2.	"Sunset Blvd."	Grimes; Dave Harris	4:38
3.	"I Saw You"	Grimes; Harris	5:08
4.	"Best Days of My Life"	Grimes; Harris; Ben Crudup	4:44
5.	"You Come Around"	Grimes	4:57
6.	"Carrie"	Grimes; Harris; Belled; Gore	4:44
7.	"I Wanna Be There"	Grimes	4:43
8.	"Summerthing"	Grimes	3:14
9.	"There Ain't Nothin'"	Grimes; Gore	5:35
10.	"Rock 'n' Roll Girl"	Grimes; Gore; Belled	4:44
11.	"Around and Around"	Grimes	5:21
12.	"Without You"	Grimes; Harris	4:22
13.	"Hollywood Sign"	Grimes; Scott Campbell; Tony Devlin	4:59
14.	"Four-Piece Band (Those Were the Days)"	Grimes	4:51
15.	"Finale"	Grimes	2:37

== Singles ==
The following singles were released from the album, with the highest charting positions listed.

Title	Year	Chart	Position
"Sunset Blvd"	2005	US Billboard Hot Adult Contemporary Tracks	18
"Livin' on the Run"	2005	US Billboard Hot Adult Contemporary Tracks	34

== Album credits ==
=== Personnel ===
- Dawn Bailey - background vocals
- Ricardo Belled - bass guitar
- Paul Buckmaster - conductor, string arrangements, string conductor
- Randy Chortkoff - executive producer
- Robin Dimaggio - percussion, drums
- Paul Escudero - Executive Producer
- Tom Fletcher - Producer, Engineer, Mixing
- Mike Glines - Digital Editing
- Jay Gore - Guitar (Acoustic), Guitar (Electric), Producer
- Scott Grimes - Guitar (Acoustic), Piano, Vocals, Vocals (background), Producer
- Kent Jacobs - Executive Producer
- Luke Miller - Hammond organ
- Sean O'Dwyer - Engineer
- Charles Paakkari - Engineer, Digital Editing
- Bryan Pitcher - Art Direction, Instrumentation
- Marc Regan - Mastering
- Kent Jacobs- Executive Producer
- Russ Regan - Executive Producer
- Colin Smith - Graphic Design
- Edward Turner - Production Assistant, Instrumentation, Production Design

== In popular culture ==
In the American Dad! episode "American Dream Factory", Steve's band (Steve is voiced by Grimes) perform "Livin' on the Run" and "Sunset Blvd".
