= Hal Sparks =

American actor (born 1969)

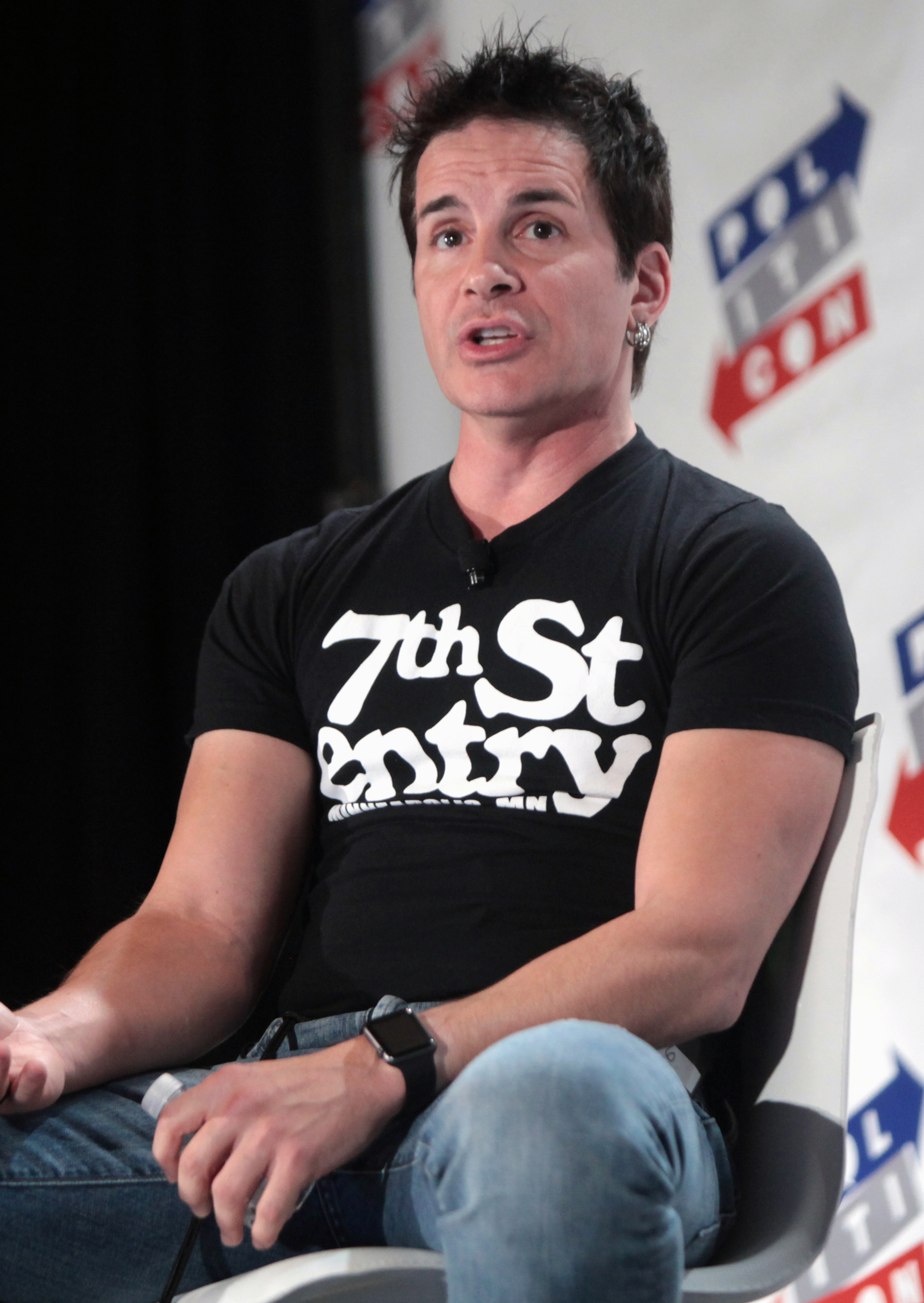
- Sparks in 2016
- Born: Hal Harry Magee Sparks III; September 25, 1969 (age 57); Cincinnati, Ohio, U.S.
- Occupations: Stand-up comedian; actor; musician; political commentator; television host; radio host; television personality
- Children: 1

Comedy career
- Years active: 1987–present
- Medium: Stand-up, television, film
- Genres: Sketch comedy, observational comedy, clean comedy
- Website: Official website

Hal Harry Magee Sparks III (born September 25, 1969) is an American stand-up comedian, actor, musician, political commentator, television and radio host and television personality. He made contributions to VH1, hosting E!'s Talk Soup, and played the roles of Michael Novotny on the American television series Queer as Folk, Donald Davenport in Lab Rats and the voice of Tak in Tak and the Power of Juju television series and video games.

== Early life ==
Sparks was born on September 25, 1969, in Cincinnati, Ohio, but grew up in Peaks Mill, Kentucky, outside of Frankfort.

Sparks played Dungeons & Dragons every Sunday with a group of friends at the local library in Frankfort. At the age of 11, he became a "de facto dungeon master" because none of his friends wanted to do the reading required to be a dungeon master.

When he was 14 years old, he moved to the Chicago area and enrolled at New Trier High School in Winnetka, Illinois, where he entered the theater department. Despite some initial opposition by his father, by 15 he began performing standup comedy and by 17 he won the title of "Chicago's Funniest Teenager" from a stand-up contest sponsored the Chicago Sun-Times.

== Career ==
=== Film ===
His first breakout role in a mainstream movie was in Dude, Where's My Car? (2000), as Zoltan, the bubble-wrapped leader of a clan of nerds obsessed with outer space. In a 2009 interview with We Are Movie Geeks, he confirmed he created the hand gesture in a "Z" formation. The "Z" hand gesture became the celebratory sign of choice among the members and fans of baseball's Pittsburgh Pirates, of whom Sparks is a fan, starting in 2012. On July 25, 2012, he threw out the first pitch during a Pirates/Cubs series at PNC Park.

Sparks has appeared in other films, including Dickie Roberts: Former Child Star and Spider-Man 2, where he had a cameo as the elevator passenger who enjoys an awkward moment with Spider-Man. He also appeared in the opening scene of the 2009 Mike Judge film Extract, as one of the guitar salesmen scammed out of a guitar by the con-woman played by Mila Kunis.

In 2004, he starred as Deputy Dale in the independently produced Lightning Bug, which was written and directed by Robert Hall, who was an original bandmate in Hal's hard rock band Zero 1.

=== Television ===
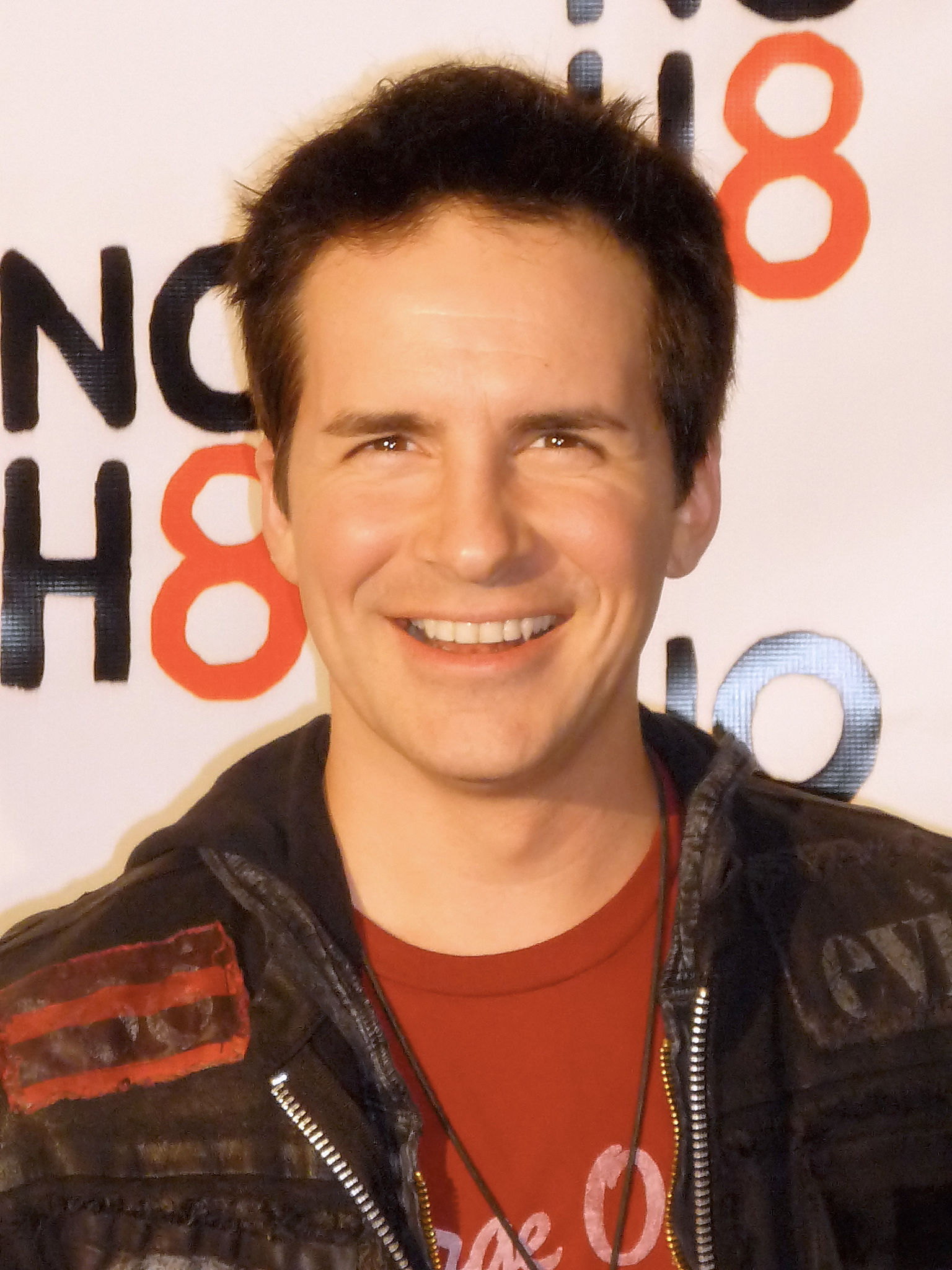
Sparks in 2009

Sparks had his screen debut on the television movie Frog, starring Shelley Duvall, Elliott Gould, and Scott Grimes in 1987. Upon graduation, Sparks moved to Los Angeles and ten years later he was hired to host Talk Soup in 1999. He appeared as himself in the video "Beat It," the Michael Jackson cover, by Fall Out Boy, and voiced a cameo on Robot Chicken.

Sparks had made appearances on various television programs from as early as 1994, when he played a long-haired skateboarder on the fourteenth episode of the first season of Lois & Clark: The New Adventures of Superman. In 1995, he appeared in the "Gentle Horse" episode of Dr. Quinn, Medicine Woman. From 2000 through 2006, he appeared in Martial Law, Frasier, One on One, CSI: Crime Scene Investigation, and Las Vegas.

He went on to independently produce his first stand-up comedy DVD Escape from Halcatraz in 2008. Sparks is a regular guest on CNN's Your $$$$$, The Joy Behar Show and The View when he is not hosting his own weekly progressive radio show. He has also participated in the Progressive Voices Cruise in 2009 and 2010.

Sparks had a leading role on the breakthrough Showtime television series, Queer as Folk, where he played Michael Novotny, a gay man living in Pittsburgh with his queer friends. The show is an American adaptation of the British series of the same name written by Russell T Davies. In 2007, Sparks became the voice of the lead character in the animated series for children, Tak & the Power of Juju for Nickelodeon (replacing Jason Marsden), which ran for twelve episodes between 2007 and 2008.

Sparks played Nelson Burkhard in the second season of Fuller House (replacing Jason Marsden). He portrayed Donald Davenport in Lab Rats. In early 2012, the Lab Rats premiere received the highest ratings for original series for the network. Sparks continued portraying Davenport in the spin-off Lab Rats: Elite Force. He provided the voice of the computer named "Mr. Q" on the American television adaptation of 20Q, which aired on the Game Show Network (GSN) in 2009.

==== Reality series and hosting ====
Sparks became the United States' youngest game show emcee in 1988 when he hosted the short-lived, syndicated game show Treasure Mall. He also participated on GSN's Extreme Dodgeball as captain of the Chicago Hitmen team.

In 2006, Sparks competed for the charity Habitat for Humanity on the Fox celebrity competition Celebrity Duets. He performed with such musical legends as Smokey Robinson, Gladys Knight, Wynonna Judd, Dennis DeYoung, Dee Snider and Sebastian Bach. He made it to the finale along with Lucy Lawless and Alfonso Ribeiro, and came in third in the series.

In 2007, Sparks was cast as the host for the WB reality series Survival of the Richest, where wealthy young adults were paired with those young adults with massive debts to complete challenges together and work as a team. Also in 2007, Sparks joined Roseanne to judge Nick at Night's search for America's Funniest Mom.

Sparks was a contestant on the 2008 VH1 celeb-reality series Celebracadabra, where the celebrities vie to out-perform each other with magic they have learned from their experienced coaches. Other celebrity contestants competing included Ant, Lisa Ann Walter, Carnie Wilson, Christopher "Kid" Reid, Kimberly Wyatt, and C. Thomas Howell. Howell was the winner, with Sparks taking second place.

In 2009, Sparks recorded his first Showtime comedy special Charmageddon in front of a standing-room-only crowd at the OC Pavilion in Santa Ana, California. The special aired in 2010 and was released on DVD.

In 2019, Sparks appeared in the premiere episode of Famously Afraid on the Travel Channel, a series in which celebrities tell of their personal unusual encounters, to describe his experience with alien abduction.

==== VH1 appearances ====
Sparks was one of five celebrities to appear in the first episode of VH1's Celebrity Paranormal Project. He has also been a regular commentator on several VH1 series, including the following:

- I Love the '70s
- I Love the '80s
- I Love the '80s Strikes Back
- I Love the '80s 3-D
- I Love the '90s
- I Love the '90s: Part Deux
- I Love the '70s: Volume II
- I Love the New Millennium
- 100 Greatest Hard Rock Songs
- Black to the Future
- Undateable

== Other ventures ==
=== Radio ===
Sparks appears as a regular guest and fill-in host on the national Stephanie Miller Radio Show, providing three hours of commentary and humor on Wednesday mornings. The program is known as "Hump Days with Hal" and is broadcast weekly from his U-stream channel. Sparks also appeared as guest host for Norman Goldman's former Los Angeles-based show. Sparks broadcast hosting was also made available through Goldman's "Beyond the Norm" segments.

He continued this free "behind the scenes" Ustream show. In June 2010, he got his own radio program on WCPT (AM) as host of The Hal Sparks Radio Program (megaworldwide), which broadcasts between 11am and 1pm CST each Saturday.

=== Music ===
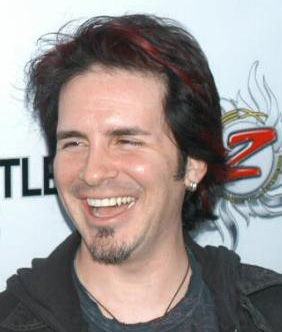
Sparks in 2007

In addition to acting, Sparks is also the lead singer and guitarist for a rock band, ZERO 1 (previously called The Hal Sparks Band). At the start, the band consisted of Sparks, his friend Rob Hall on bass and Sparks' cousin Miles Loretta on drums. Their self-titled debut album was released in December 2006 and produced by King's X's frontman DUg Pinnick. The album is available through iTunes and on Sparks' official website.

In 2007, both Sparks and Loretta from Zero 1 participated on Doug's solo project Strum Sum Up.

The band now has a new lineup consisting of Sparks (lead vocals and guitar), Brian Crow (guitar and backup vocals), Bumper Renga (bass and backup vocals) and Lance Tamanaha (drums and backup vocals). They signed with the record label "rocket science" and have a new album on the way called The sacred nothing. Also expected to debut is the band's first video for the single "American Psycho," which was directed by Adrienne Wanyo and filmed on location at the Houdini Mansion.

Sparks was a contestant in the first season of Celebrity Duets. He often joins the Los Angeles cover band Steel Panther to sing classic 1980s metal tunes, such as the Skid Row hit "Youth Gone Wild".

=== Stand-up ===
In 2011 he joined Stephanie Miller and John Fugelsang for the successful Sexy Liberal Comedy Tour in various cities across the country. This tour topped more than a million dollars in ticket sales while raising money for local progressive causes. In 2012, Sparks and Fugelsang began the "Politics, Sex and Religion Tour."

== Personal life ==
Sparks is an activist who regularly participates in charitable events for organizations like AIDS Walk, Farm Sanctuary, the Lilli Claire Foundation, Imagine a Cure and the Marijuana Policy Project. He is straight edge and says he never drinks alcohol, smokes tobacco or uses recreational drugs.

While at Los Angeles International Airport in 2010, Sparks and an airline passenger used CPR on an unconscious, elderly man who had collapsed in the airport terminal and continued CPR until first responders arrived.

In May 2011, Sparks announced he would become a father during a Ustream show on Father's Day. He debuted his son Camden Harrison Sparks at the 2011 AIDS Walk in Los Angeles.

Sparks has studied martial arts since the age of 8 years old and holds belts in Karate, Tae Kwon Do, and several forms of Kung Fu including Wushu.

In 2012, the Pittsburgh Pirates began using the "Zoltan" hand gesture shown by Sparks in the film Dude, Where's My Car? as a good luck symbol to turn around a 19-season losing streak. After a Twitter campaign to encourage the "real Zoltan" to appear at a game, Sparks flew to Pittsburgh on July 25, 2012, to throw out the honorary first pitch, and was on hand to see the Pirates win 3–2 over his hometown team, the Chicago Cubs. The good luck charm was ultimately ineffective, as the Pirates had a 20th losing season

Sparks is a Freemason, having been initiated on November 6, 2016, at Los Angeles Lodge No 42 F. & A. M.

He lived in Chinatown, Los Angeles as of 2017. He also does a political commentary talk show on the Chicago radio station WCPT 820 AM on Saturdays, which is uploaded on his YouTube channel. He also has a Twitch account.

== Filmography ==
=== Film ===
Year	Title	Role	Notes
1987	Frog	Jim	Television film
1989	Chopper Chicks in Zombietown	Lance	
1996	Invader	Fort Irwin Defense Command	Voice
1999	Lost & Found	DJ	
2000	Dude, Where's My Car?	Zoltan – Cult Leader	
2001	Dr. Dolittle 2	School Fish #1	Voice
2002	Bleacher Bums	Richie	Television film
2003	Dickie Roberts: Former Child Star	Publisher	
2004	Lightning Bug	Deputy Dale	
2004	Spider-Man 2	Elevator Passenger	Cameo
2006	Denial		Executive Producer
2007	Spider-Man 2.1	Elevator Passenger	
2007	In Search of Steve Ditko	Elevator Passenger	Archive footage
2008	Dead Space: Downfall	Ramirez	Voice
2009	The House That Jack Built	Tommy	
2009	Extract	Guitar Salesman #1	
2011	Slip Away	Seth	Short film
2015	The A-List	Brad	

=== Television ===
Year	Title	Role	Notes
1988	Treasure Mall	Himself	Game Show
1994	Lois & Clark: The New Adventures of Superman	Skateboarder	Episode: "Witness"
1995	Dr. Quinn, Medicine Woman	Gentle Horse	Episode: "Indian Agent"
1995	Signs and Wonders	Rocker 2	Unknown episode
1995–1996	Night Stand	Father Chip	Episodes: "Follow-Up Show", "Confessions"
1997	Omba Mokomba		Writer/Segment Producer
1998	Cheap Theatrix		
1999–2000	Talk Soup	Host	
2000	Martial Law	Ellroy Nelson	Episode: "No Fare"
2000–2005	Queer as Folk	Michael Novotny	5 seasons
2001–2002	Rendez-View	Guest Host	Episodes: "She Loves Him, Loves Him Not", "Belgian Boy Toy"
2002	One on One	Danny Davis Jr.	Episodes: "Unemployment Up, Pride Down", "I Believe I Can Fly: Part 2"
2003	Frasier	Receptionist	Episode: "Door Jam"
2004	Extreme Dodgeball	Player for Chicago Hitmen	
2005	CSI: Crime Scene Investigation	Digger James	Episode: "Dog Eat Dog"
2005	Video Game Vixens	Host	
2006	Las Vegas	Doctor Paul	Episode: "Cash Springs Eternal"
2006	Survival of the Richest	Host	
2006	The Best of Talk Soup	Host	Archive footage
2006	Robot Chicken	Himself/Ben Stiller	
2006	Celebrity Duets	Contestant, Third Runner Up	
2006	Celebrity Paranormal Project		Episode: "Waverly Hills Sanatorium"
2007–2009	Tak and the Power of Juju	Tak, Really, Really Revolting Juju	Voice role; 26 episodes
2007	America's Funniest Mom 3	Himself/Judge	
2008	Rock Band 2: The Stars	Guest Star	
2008	Celebracadabra	Himself, First Runner Up	Reality Show
2009	20Q	Co-Host, Voice of Mr. Q the Computer	
2009	2009 Game Show Awards	Mr. Q	Voice role
2010	The Tester	Judge in Sony PlayStation Series	
2010	Web Soup	Himself	Special Guest Appearance with Chris Hardwick
2010	Hal Sparks: Charmageddon	Himself	Stand-up special
2010	The Ha!ifax Comedy Fest		Writer
2012	TMI Hollywood		Writer
2012–2016	Lab Rats	Donald Davenport	Main role
2015	Mighty Med	Donald Davenport	Episode: "Lab Rats vs. Mighty Med"
2016	Lab Rats: Elite Force	Donald Davenport	Recurring role
2016	Fuller House	Nelson Burkhard	
2018	Grey's Anatomy	Dr. Scott Hanson	Season 14 Episode 18
2019	Milo Murphy's Law	Evan Chaffe	Voice role; 1 episode
2019	Famously Afraid	Himself	Reality show, Season 1 Episode 1

=== Video games ===
Year	Title	Role	Notes
2007	Nicktoons: Attack of the Toybots	Tak	Voice role
2008	SpongeBob SquarePants Featuring Nicktoons: Globs of Doom	Tak	Voice role
2008	Tak and the Guardians of Gross	Tak	Voice role

=== Music videos ===
Year	Title	Artist	Role	Notes
2007	"Some Lovin'"	Murk vs. Kristine W	Himself	
2008	"Beat It"	Fall Out Boy	Himself	
2013	"Party Like Tomorrow Is the End of the World"	Steel Panther	Himself	

== Discography ==
- Charmageddon (2010)
- Wreckcreation (2018)
