= Redmond Burke =

American surgeon (born 1958)

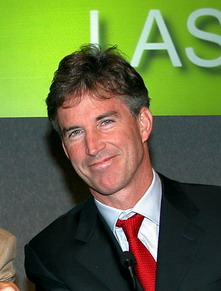
- Born: November 4, 1958 (age 67); Honolulu, Territory of Hawaii, U.S.
- Education: Stanford University and Harvard Medical School
- Occupation: Pediatric cardiothoracic surgeon

Redmond P. Burke (born 4 November 1958) is an American congenital heart surgeon, author, and founder of The Congenital Heart Institute at Miami Children's Hospital in Miami, Florida. He starred in the ABC pilot television show Miracle Workers (2006 TV series). Burke has been recognized as one of the world's most innovative surgeons, and for his use of information technology to improve surgical outcomes.

== Early life and education ==
Redmond Burke was born in Honolulu, Hawaii, to a US Navy flight navigator, Redmond Joseph Burke, and his wife Claire Lorraine Burke, both from San Francisco, California.

Burke and his three younger sisters grew up in Cupertino, California. He was educated at Portal Elementary School, John F. Kennedy Junior High School, and Monta Vista High School, where he won the Outstanding Wrestler award at the Central Coast Section Championships in 1976. Burke placed fifth in the California State Wrestling Championships that year.

He attended Stanford University, majoring in human biology. Burke attended medical school at Harvard University from 1980 to 1984.

== Career ==
Burke was selected for General Surgical Residency Training at the Brigham and Women's Hospital. In 1989, after completing general surgery training, and in preparation for cardiac surgery training, Burke spent a year as a research fellow at the Massachusetts Institute of Technology, in the Spectroscopy Laboratory, under Michael Stephen Feld. Burke developed the idea that Laser-induced fluorescence spectroscopy could be used to diagnose rejection in transplanted cardiac tissue, thereby avoiding the need for traumatic biopsies.

Burke was selected for cardiac surgery training under program director Lawrence H. Cohn. He spent six months as the Chief Resident in Pediatric Cardiac Surgery under Aldo Castaneda. Burke was offered the position of Chief of Pediatric Cardiac Surgery at the University of California, San Francisco and he joined the Children's Hospital Boston attending staff in 1992, becoming an Instructor in Surgery at the Harvard Medical School.

Burke became the Chief of Pediatric Cardiovascular Surgery at Miami Children's Hospital. Burke's program was designed around two key principles: reduce the trauma of care for each patient over their lifetime and leverage the power of information technology to improve medical outcomes.

== Research ==
Burke explored the possibility of using endoscopic surgical techniques for congenital heart surgery, designing instruments and techniques in the laboratory. He began clinical applications in 1993, subsequently performing the world's first endoscopic vascular ring division, diaphragm plication, and thoracic duct ligation. Burke became a recognized expert in the field of minimally invasive pediatric cardiac surgery. He developed thoracoscopic surgical instruments with engineers from Pilling Weck, Inc. Burke and Craig Lillehei, an attending pediatric surgeon, also performed the first three pediatric Heart-Lung Transplantations in New England, with the help of colleagues from the Brigham and Women's Hospital including Malcolm Decamp, and Sari Aranki.

Beginning in 1996, Burke and the interventional cardiology team at Miami Children's Hospital published a series of hybrid approaches, where the surgeons operated in the catheterization laboratory, and the cardiologists performed interventions in the operating room.

Burke and associate surgeon Robert Hannan worked with their Director of Perfusion, Jorge W. Ojito, to develop a less traumatic cardiopulmonary bypass technique. They also designed a miniaturized Cardiopulmonary Support circuit, allowing critically ill patients to be transported by plane, helicopter or ambulance over great distances on full heart lung bypass. In 2007, Burke and Zahn, at Miami Children's partnered with cardiac teams in Boston and New York in the first US trial of the Medtronic Melody Transcatheter Pulmonary Valve, which allowed patients with pulmonary valve disease to have their valves replaced without surgery.

=== Information technology ===
When Burke arrived in Miami in 1995, he hired Jeffrey A. White to act as a technology advisor, working with the heart team to find and develop applications of information technology to improve medical outcomes. This collaboration resulted in a relational database for congenital heart surgery, a web-based information system for a medical team, and web based reporting of medical outcomes in real time. The web-based information system enabled a unique form of rounds, which they called "internet rounds," enabling information exchange and clinical decision making over the Internet. Beginning in 2002, Burke's surgical team started continuously measuring and reporting their surgical outcomes on the web. In 2006, Burke and White collaborated with IBM to create a voice activated medical information system for use in hands free hospital environments, like the operating room, allowing the surgeons to access critical information from their electronic medical records with voice activated commands. In 2007, Burke and his team enabled patients and families to access their electronic medical record, also known as a personal health record, any time, anywhere, with any web enabled device. In 2013, Burke's team was selected for the Google Glass Explorer program after presenting a YouTube video demonstrating how they intended to "heal with Glass". Their proposal was recognized in several IT publications including PC Magazine. In 2015, the heart team used a 3D printed model of a child's heart and lungs to design a novel repair for complex total anomalous pulmonary venous connection. The operation was successful, and generated worldwide media coverage. In 2016, an "inoperable" patient with a single lung and hypoplastic left heart syndrome was referred to Nicklaus Children's Hospital. Using Google Cardboard as a Virtual Reality Viewer, a novel operation was planned and performed successfully. This unique synthesis of technology and surgery was recognized worldwide.

== The Congenital Heart Institute ==
In 2002, the Arnold Palmer Hospital for Children in Orlando, Florida lost their congenital heart program. Burke initiated meetings with hospital administrator Janet Livingstone, CEO John Hillenmeyer, and Medical Director Mark Swanson, proposing that the Miami Children's Cardiac Team help rebuild the Arnold Palmer Heart Program. Arnold Palmer, the hospital's founder, approved of the plan, and used his considerable influence to finance the effort. The Congenital Heart Institute at Miami Children's Hospital and Arnold Palmer Hospital was created, with Burke and Evan Zahn acting as co-directors. The synthesis of Burke's work was to achieve resonance within a congenital heart team, a condition where every member of the team was driven by a common desire to reduce therapeutic trauma. The human side of Burke's congenital heart team at Nicklaus Children's Hospital has been described in parent's websites, and in the media. Immediately after Hurricane Maria in 2017, Burke and colleagues worked with physicians in Puerto Rico to transport newborn babies with critical heart defects to Miami for urgent surgical care.

== Television ==
Burke was cast as the host of the ABC network television reality program Miracle Workers, which first aired March 6, 2006. The program followed patients through complex medical treatments, showing the technical and emotional aspects of modern medical care. The program was controversial, as it potentially induced patients to give up their privacy in return for medical care. Reviews were mixed, some finding the program "inspirational and informative" and others finding the emotional content to be inappropriate.

Burke has appeared on CNN (1996), Good Morning America (1997, 2006), The Today Show (1997), CNN Showbiz Tonight (March 8, 2006), Extra (2006) and Entertainment Tonight (1996) to describe novel medical achievements. Citrix, an international computer networking company, used Burke's experience with information technology to highlight their concept of on demand information - "for your life's work". Creative media teams have developed compelling connections between the Miami Children's Hospital Congenital Heart Surgery Team, and innovations in Information Technology.

== Honors ==
- Honorary Speaker Federal Bar
- Healing Heart Award
- Google Glass Explorer

== Patents ==
- Extracorporeal bypass technology

== Personal life ==
In 1995, he married Kim Horstman, a nurse from Strongsville, Ohio, and they have three daughters.
