= It Came Upon the Midnight Clear (film) =

1984 American television film

- Genre: Drama; Family
- Written by: Frank Cardea; George Schenck
- Directed by: Peter H. Hunt
- Starring: Mickey Rooney; Scott Grimes
- Music by: Arthur B. Rubinstein
- Country of origin: United States

Production
- Producer: George Schenck
- Production locations: New York City; Los Angeles
- Cinematography: Dean Cundey
- Editor: Jerrold L. Ludwig
- Running time: 96 minutes
- Production companies: Schenck/Cardea Productions; Columbia Pictures Television

Original release
- Release: December 8, 1984

It Came Upon the Midnight Clear is a 1984 American made-for-television Christmas drama film starring Mickey Rooney and Scott Grimes.

== Plot ==
The film centers on Mike Halligan (Mickey Rooney), a retired cop, who suffers a fatal heart attack while putting up Christmas lights days before Christmas. While waiting in the queue before the gates of Heaven he makes a deal with an archangel to return to life on Earth for a few more days in order to fulfill a promise to take his grandson (Scott Grimes) to New York City for the Christmas holidays. In exchange, he has to find a wayward angel (William Griffis) and tries to restore the Christmas Spirit to New York City.

== Cast ==
- Mickey Rooney as Mike Halligan
- Scott Grimes as Robbie Westin
- Barrie Youngfellow as Kate Westin
- George Gaynes as the Arch Angel
- Elisha Cook, Jr. as Mr. Bibbs
- Annie Potts as Cindy Mills
- Lloyd Nolan as Monsignor Donoghue
- Gary Bayer as Rick Westin
- William Griffis as Wiley Boggs
- Christina Pickles as Chris
- Hamilton Camp as Meek Angel
- Lurene Tuttle as Mrs. Hunt

== See also ==
- List of Christmas films
