= Fox Kids =

Children's programming division of Fox

Fox Kids (United States)
- Second to last logo, used between 1998 and 2002
- Network: Fox
- Launched: September 8, 1990; 36 years ago (as Fox Kids Network); February 6, 1998; 28 years ago (as Fox Kids)
- Closed: February 5, 1998; 28 years ago (as Fox Kids Network); September 7, 2002; 24 years ago (replaced by FoxBox on September 14, 2002; 24 years ago); 2004; 22 years ago (as a channel in Europe (excluding Finland) and Latin America, replaced by Jetix); January 6, 2019; 7 years ago (Finland)
- Country of origin: United States
- Owner: Fox Family Worldwide
- Key people: Haim Saban (CEO, Saban Entertainment)
- Headquarters: Los Angeles, California, U.S.
- Formerly known as: Fox Children's Network (1990–1991); Fox Kids Network (1991–1998)
- Format: Children's programming
- Original language: American English
- Official website: foxkids.com (archive index)

Fox Kids (originally known as Fox Children's Network and later as the Fox Kids Network; stylized in all caps, until February 5, 1998) was an American children's programming block and branding for a slate of international children's television channels. Originally a joint venture between News Corporation and their Fox affiliated stations, they were later partnered with Saban Entertainment under the Fox Family Worldwide joint venture.

The Fox Kids brand originated on a programming block that launched on the Fox network from September 8, 1990 to September 7, 2002. The block aired on Saturday mornings throughout its existence (Sunday mornings in Canada), with an additional lineup on Monday through Friday afternoons airing until December 28, 2001. Fox Kids is the only form of daytime television programming, outside of sports, aired by the Fox network to date. Following then-Fox parent News Corporation's sale of Fox Kids Worldwide to The Walt Disney Company in July 2001, Fox put the remaining Saturday morning timeslot up for bidding, with 4Kids Entertainment winning and securing the rights to program that period. The Fox Kids block continued to air until September 7, 2002, and was replaced the following week (on September 14) by the 4Kids-programmed FoxBox block.

Fox Kids was best known for airing the most-popular programs on the network, such as Bobby's World and the Power Rangers series, with the latter dominating the block's schedule with increased ratings and creating a franchise, resulting in Fox Kids frequently using Power Rangers for its promotions due to the shows' popularity.

Outside the United States, the first Fox Kids-branded television channel was launched in Australia on October 1, 1995, on cable and satellite television provider Foxtel. It then expanded to the United Kingdom and Ireland, launching on BSkyB in 1996, and after that it started broadcasts in Latin America on November of that same year. The channel expanded between 1997 and 2001 in Europe and Middle East, and beginning in 2004, the international Fox Kids channels were gradually relaunched under the Jetix brand following Disney's acquisition of Fox Family Worldwide.

== History ==
=== Foundation ===
According to James B. Stewart's book DisneyWar, Fox Kids' history is intertwined with that of the syndicated children's program block The Disney Afternoon. DuckTales, the series that served as the launching pad for The Disney Afternoon, premiered in syndication in September 1987, airing on Fox's owned-and-operated stations as well as various Fox affiliates in many markets. This may have been due to the fact that the Walt Disney Company's chief executive officer at the time, Michael Eisner, and his then-Fox counterpart, Barry Diller, had worked together at ABC and at Paramount Pictures.

In 1988, Disney purchased independent television station KHJ-TV in Los Angeles, changing its call letters to KCAL-TV the next year. The station's new owners wanted DuckTales to be shown on KCAL, effectively taking the local television rights to the animated series away from Fox-owned KTTV. Furious at the breach of contract, Diller pulled DuckTales from all of Fox's other owned-and-operated stations in the fall of 1989. Diller also encouraged the network's affiliates to do the same, though most did not initially.

As Disney went forward in developing The Disney Afternoon, Fox (whose schedule at the time was limited to prime time programming on Saturday and Sunday nights) began the process of launching its own children's programming lineup. By June 1989, first show Pigout (created by Fred Silverman, Joseph Ruby and Kenneth Spears of Ruby-Spears) (and later redeveloped as Piggsburg Pigs) was pitched. Margaret Loesch, then president and chief executive officer of Marvel Productions, was appointed as president of still officially unnamed Fox's children programming block. Due to Loesch's contractual obligations to Marvel Productions, she was not able to join Fox until March 1990.

Fox Kids was launched on September 8, 1990, as the Fox Children's Network, a joint venture between the Fox Broadcasting Company and its affiliates. Initially, its programming aired for 30 minutes per day on Monday through Fridays, and for 3 hours on Saturday mornings. In September 1991, the block was rebranded as the Fox Kids Network, with its programming expanding to 90 minutes on weekdays and 4 hours on Saturday mornings. The weekday editions of the block grew to three hours the following year.

In 1994, the Fox Kids brand extended to home video, where Fox Video launched a line, Fox Kids Video, initially releasing titles based on Bobby's World, and it was extended in 1995 to add three more shows based on the three series on the same network, Eek! the Cat, The Tick and Where on Earth Is Carmen Sandiego?. Two years later, it was extended further in 1997 to add shows from the CBS, Marvel and Saban libraries.

=== Scheduling ===
Throughout most of its history, Fox Kids aired several promos for its programs during commercial breaks, with no exact time slots announced for the shows. This was due to the programs airing at different times depending on the local Fox-affiliated station's schedule in the viewer's television market (i.e., if Fox Kids aired a promo for a show such as Power Rangers, it would not announce an exact Monday-Friday/Saturday time slot to viewers, forcing the viewers to check their local Fox station listings, such as their TV Guide or newspaper, to search for the air time of the show, and some stations use voiceovers to announce the time slot, similar to those like first-run syndicated programs and/or PBS' PTV and later, PBS Kids block at the time).

By the fall of 1992, Fox Kids increased its schedule to three hours on Monday through Fridays, airing usually from 2:00 PM to 5:00 PM local time (making Fox the first network to air programming in the 4:00 p.m. hour since 1986), and four hours on Saturdays from 8:00 AM to noon Eastern and Pacific Time (7:00 AM to 11:00 AM Central and Mountain). Many stations split the weekday lineup programming into a one-hour block in the morning and a two-hour block in the afternoon (though this varied slightly in some markets), when network programs intertwined with syndicated children's lineups."Fox Kids (December 1992)". Other stations aired all three hours combined in the afternoon due to their carriage of local morning newscasts and/or syndicated talk shows; stations that aired such programming in this case had dropped children's programs acquired via the syndication market, moving them to other "independent" stations. Very few Fox stations aired all three hours of the weekday block in the morning.

In 1992, Fox Kids began holding a "TV Takeover" event on Thanksgiving afternoon.

==== Broadcasting ambiguities ====
When Fox Kids launched, it was carried on virtually all of Fox's owned-and-operated stations and affiliates, with few (if any) declining to carry it. The first Fox station to drop the block was Miami affiliate WSVN, the network's first station to maintain a news-intensive format, in 1993 (the station had been a Fox affiliate since January 1989 as a result of NBC purchasing and moving its programming to longtime CBS affiliate WTVJ in a three-station ownership and affiliation swap in the Miami market).

The following year, in May 1994, Fox signed a multi-station affiliation agreement with New World Communications to switch that company's CBS, ABC and NBC affiliates to the network between September 1994, and July 1995, in order to improve its affiliate coverage in certain markets after the National Football League awarded Fox the contract to the National Football Conference television package. Many of the stations owned by New World (which later merged with Fox's then-parent company News Corporation in July 1996) declined to carry the block in order to air syndicated programs aimed at older audiences or local newscasts. In certain cities with an independent station, or beginning with the launches of those networks in January 1995, affiliates of UPN and The WB, Fox contracted the Fox Kids block to air on one of these stations if a Fox owned-and-operated station or affiliate chose not to carry it. In some cases, Fox Kids would be carried on the same station as one of its two competing children's blocks, The WB's Kids' WB and UPN's UPN Kids block (the latter of which was replaced in 1999 by Disney's One Too).

Between 1995 and early 1996, Fox acquired three former ABC-affiliated stations (WHBQ-TV/Memphis, KTVI/St. Louis, and WGHP/High Point). Meanwhile, SF Broadcasting (a joint venture between Savoy Pictures and Fox) acquired three former NBC affiliates and one ABC affiliate during the summer of 1994 (which were later sold to Emmis Communications in 1996). Those stations all aired early evening local newscasts, but wanted to continue to run general entertainment syndicated programming to lead into their news programs instead of cartoons; these stations opted to run Fox Kids one hour early, from 1:00 PM to 4:00 PM. WGHP stopped airing the block in March 1996 after the station agreed to move it to WBFX (which aired the block for the remainder of its run). In August 1995, religious independent station KNLC assumed the rights to Fox Kids from KDNL-TV (which became an ABC affiliate) after KPLR-TV turned down; however, due to the station's decision to air public service messages from its owner's ministry about controversial topics in lieu of local advertisements, Fox pulled the block from KNLC in mid-1996. As a result, KTVI became the only Fox station that was involved in the network's 1994 deal with New World Communications to carry the block.

Much of the Fox Kids lineup's early programming was produced by Warner Bros. Animation, calling Fox Children's Network a "one-stop shop", essentially pulling out of the children's syndication market by signing a $100-million deal with Fox in May 1991. This meant they moved all their existing programming to Fox Kids. Two of Fox Kids' most popular programs, Animaniacs (following a heated dispute with Fox after it ceded the program's timeslot to carry Mighty Morphin Power Rangers, which became one of the block's highest-rated programs when it debuted in 1993) and Batman: The Animated Series, moved to The WB after that network launched in January 1995, though Batman: The Animated Series would remain on Fox Kids until 1997. Both Animaniacs and a slightly revamped Batman served as the linchpin of The WB's new children's block, Kids' WB, when it launched in September of that year (Tiny Toon Adventures, another early Fox Kids program that Warner Bros. produced and also aired on Kids' WB in reruns, had already ended its run).

10960 Wilshire Boulevard, headquarters of Fox Kids Worldvide in the late 1990s

In 1996, after having established a "strategic alliance" with Fox, Saban Entertainment merged with Fox Children's Productions to form a new company, Fox Kids Worldwide, with aims to become a public company and pursue international expansion. In 1997, the venture was renamed Fox Family Worldwide after it acquired International Family Entertainment—owner of the cable network The Family Channel, seeking a cable outlet for the Fox Kids programs to compete with services such as Cartoon Network (owned by Time Warner) and Nickelodeon (owned by Viacom).

In 1998, Fox bought out its affiliates' interest in Fox Kids as part of a deal to help pay for the network's NFL package. The Fox Kids weekday block was reduced to two hours, and in an effort to help its affiliates comply with the recently implemented educational programming mandates defined by the Children's Television Act, reruns of former PBS series The Magic School Bus were added to the lineup. In 2000, affiliates were given the option of pushing the block up one hour to air from 2:00 PM to 4:00 PM rather than 3:00 PM to 5:00 PM In the six or so markets where a Fox affiliate carried Fox Kids and carried an early evening newscast at 5:00 PM (such as St. Louis and New Orleans), the station was already running the block an hour early by 1996. Some affiliates (such as WLUK-TV) would tape delay the block to air between 10:00 AM and 1:00 PM, one of the lowest-rated time periods on American television (and when virtually all children 5 years of age and older are at school). A few only aired The Magic School Bus in this sort of daytime slot as an act of malicious compliance with the Children's Television Act. Fox Kids fought vehemently against the E/I rule during its development.

=== End of Fox Kids ===
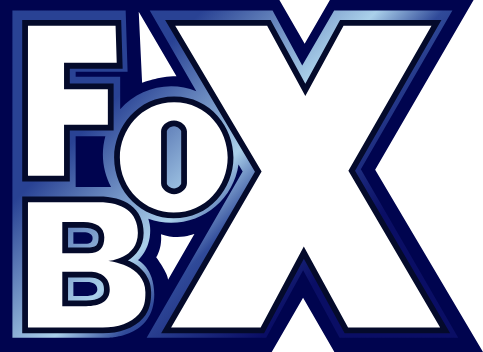
The "FoxBox" logo (successor programming block of Fox Kids)

By 2001, members of the Fox affiliate board had felt they were on much more even footing with the "Big Three" networks and wanted to take back the time allocated to the Fox Kids programming blocks to air their own programming. Saturday mornings, long the only province of children's programming, had become a liability as the other networks started to extend their weekday morning news programs to weekends.

Fox Kids, which had been the top-rated children's program block among the major networks since 1992, had been overtaken in the ratings by ABC's One Saturday Morning block in 1997, then by Kids' WB a year later with the stronger animation block backed by Warner Bros. that included shows such as Pokémon and Yu-Gi-Oh!. ABC and UPN aired mostly comedy-based cartoons at this time, with the exception of live-action teen-oriented sitcoms Lizzie McGuire and Even Stevens (both originated on Disney Channel as part of what would be a gradual takeover of ABC's Saturday morning lineup by the cable channel's programming), while Viacom-owned CBS aired E/I compliant preschool programming from Nick Jr., and NBC aired teen-oriented sitcoms (later to be replaced the following year by E/I-compliant programming sourced from Discovery Kids), splintering the audience. The added factor of Nickelodeon's aggressive schedule that outrated all of the broadcast networks among children on Saturday mornings left Fox Kids behind, and programmers could not find a solution to catch up. Fox Family experienced a 35% audience decline, which led to Fox Family Worldwide, the stake in Fox Kids Europe, and Saban Entertainment being sold to The Walt Disney Company in 2001. The success of Digimon helped Fox Kids temporarily return to competitiveness with Nickelodeon and The WB in February 2001; by this point the rumors of a major restructure had already begun.

After Fox Family Worldwide was sold to The Walt Disney Company in July 2001, Fox Kids was placed under the oversight of Fox Television Entertainment and moved its programming operations to Fox's headquarters on the 20th Century Fox studio lot; Fox discontinued daytime children's programming on December 28, 2001, giving the time back to its affiliates. In addition, from September 17, 2001 until the weekday block was discontinued, network flagship stations WNYW and KTTV deferred it to their UPN-affiliated sister stations while continuing to air the block on Saturday mornings. Fox put its children's programming block up for bidding, and 4Kids Entertainment, then-producers of the English dub of Pokémon, purchased the remaining four-hour Saturday time period. Fox Kids maintained a Saturday morning-only schedule until September 7, 2002, a week before it gave the time to 4Kids Entertainment.

Fox Kids was replaced by the 4Kids Entertainment-produced FoxBox block on September 14, 2002. The block, renamed 4Kids TV on January 22, 2005, ran until December 27, 2008, marking Fox's complete withdrawal from children's programming, with the exception of educational programming acquired from the syndication market, most notably Xploration Station, which began airing primarily on Fox stations in 2014.

=== After Fox Kids ===
While Fox Kids ended its existence on broadcast television in the United States, Disney instituted a two-hour morning lineup on its newly acquired ABC Family cable channel (known as the "ABC Family Action Block") that was programmed similarly to Fox Kids and featured content originated on the block.

Internationally, Fox Kids Europe continued to operate the international channels in both Europe and Israel, while The Walt Disney Company themselves took over all the channels throughout Latin America. The original intention of The Walt Disney Company after the acquisition was to rebrand all Fox Kids operations outside of the US with Toon Disney, a channel that had very little distribution internationally, but this was scrapped, with 20th Century Fox granting a non-fixed term license for Fox Kids Europe to continue using the "Fox Kids" brand at no charge.

On January 8, 2004, Fox Kids Europe, Fox Kids Latin America, and ABC Cable Networks Group announced the launch of Jetix, a brand that would take over the Fox Kids networks in Europe, Israel and Latin America, and operate as a block in all other territories, including North America. Within the global launch of the brand, the Fox Kids Europe company was renamed as Jetix Europe, with the first European Fox Kids network to make the rebranding being the French feed in August 2004, and ending with the German feed's rebranding in June 2005.

In 2010, former Fox Kids president Margaret Loesch was appointed the position of president and CEO of the then newly-launched children's network The Hub, a joint venture between Discovery Communications and Hasbro Entertainment which replaced Discovery Kids. A few shows that have once aired on Fox Kids, such as Goosebumps, Ninja Turtles: The Next Mutation, Batman: The Animated Series, Tiny Toon Adventures, and Animaniacs, were rerun on The Hub. Loesch stepped down of her position as Hub Network president and CEO in late 2014, ahead of network's rebranding to Discovery Family.

The Fox Kids name was used again for the web series Fox Kids Movie Challenge, produced by 20th Century Fox for the Fox Family Entertainment YouTube channel despite having no affiliation with the brand.

== List of versions ==
All of the channels of Fox Kids transitioned to Jetix after the purchase by Disney.

Market	Type	Launch date	Replacement	Replaced date
United States	Programming Block on Fox	8 September 1990	FoxBox	7 September 2002
United Kingdom and Ireland	Channel	19 October 1996	Jetix	1 January 2005
Latin America	Channel	20 November 1996	Jetix	1 August 2004
Middle East and North Africa	Channel	9 January 1997	Jetix	1 January 2005
Netherlands	Channel	2 August 1997	Jetix	13 February 2005
France	Channel	15 November 1997	Jetix	27 August 2004
Scandinavia	Channel	12 February 1998	Jetix	October 2004
Poland	Channel	18 April 1998	Jetix	1 January 2005
Spain	Channel	18 November 1998	Jetix	7 January 2005
Romania	Channel	April 1999	Jetix	1 January 2005
Moldova	Channel	April 1999	Jetix	1 January 2005
Moldova	Channel	April 1999	Jetix	1 January 2005
Russia	Channel	April 1999	Jetix	1 January 2005
Turkey	Channel	April 1999	Jetix	1 January 2005
Bulgaria	Channel	April 1999	Jetix	1 January 2005
Italy	Channel	1 April 2000	Jetix	1 March 2005
Germany	Channel	1 October 2000	Jetix	10 June 2005
Hungary	Channel	November 2000	Jetix	1 January 2005
Czech Republic	Channel	February 2001	Jetix	1 January 2005
Slovakia	Channel	February 2001	Jetix	1 January 2005
Israel	Channel	February 2001	Jetix	March 2005
Greece	Channel	1 October 2001	Jetix	1 January 2005

== Radio ==
In addition to the program block, Fox Kids had its own radio program in the United States, the Fox Kids Radio Countdown. This two-hour broadcast was hosted by Chris Leary of ZDTV and TechTV fame and consisted of contests and gags, with sound effects incorporated throughout the program. It was later renamed as Fox All Access (in effect, growing up with its original audience) and served primarily as a promotional vehicle for Fox television programs, current artists, and films in its later years, before eventually ending its run in 2012.

== See also ==
- 4Kids TV – successor children's program block to Fox Kids, running from September 2002 to December 2008, produced by 4Kids Entertainment.
- Jetix – action-oriented children's program block on ABC Family and Toon Disney, and international cable channels owned by The Walt Disney Company, operating from 2004 to 2009.
- Kids' WB – competitor that was later bought by 4Kids and rebranded as CW4Kids, later Toonzai.
- Vortexx – children's program block produced by Saban Brands for The CW from August 2012 to September 2014.
- Discovery Family – family-oriented network co-owned by Warner Bros. Discovery and Hasbro; formerly known as The Hub/Hub Network from October 2010 to October 2014, which was also once led by former Fox Kids president Margaret Loesch.
