= Chris Leary =

- Education: Temple University; The Groundlings
- Occupations: Television and radio show personality

Chris Leary is a national television and radio show personality, who was the host of the Fox Kids Countdown (later rebranded Fox All Access) syndicated radio show from 1994 to 2012.

== Professional wrestling ==
Leary worked for World Wrestling Federation appearing on WWF Sunday Night Heat, WWF Jakked and Metal as a commentator, interviewer and host.

== Radio and television career ==
He has appeared in different shows like We TV's makeover show Ugliest House on the Block. He hosted reality game show Master of Champions on the ABC network. Chris also co-hosts a weekly relationship talk show, The Single Life, seen on Mav TV (2009–2010).

He has worked as a Technology anchor for Tech TV and has made appearances on CNN and ABC network's The View. Chris was also host and producer for a video countdown show for the Fox Family Channel. Before TV, he was a local radio show host in cities including Los Angeles, Washington, D.C., and Philadelphia, where he graduated from Temple University. Chris also studied at the Groundlings school in Los Angeles for two years.

From 2015 to 2018, he was an anchor at WUSA-TV in Washington, D.C. From 2018 to 2023, he anchored for Spectrum News in Southern California.

== Personal life ==
Chris is from the suburbs of Philadelphia, where he started his career as a hydraulic cylinder repair man for his father's business before segueing into the entertainment field.

In his down time, Chris, a pilot, likes flying general aviation single engine airplanes around the Los Angeles area, where he resides.
