= 20Q (game show) =

2009 American TV show

- Genre: Game show
- Based on: 20Q by Robin Burgener
- Directed by: Rob George
- Presented by: Cat Deeley
- Narrated by: Hal Sparks (as "Mr. Q.")
- Theme music composer: Transcenders
- Country of origin: United States
- No. of seasons: 1
- No. of episodes: 9

Production
- Executive producers: Noah Bonnet; David Hurwitz
- Producer: Jack Seifert
- Production location: Sunset Las Palmas Studios
- Editors: Marty Skibosh; Mark S. Andrew A.C.E.
- Running time: 60 minutes
- Production company: Endemol USA

Original release
- Network: GSN
- Release: June 13 – August 15, 2009

Related
- 20 Questions (1946–1955)

20Q is an American game show based on the online artificial intelligence and handheld computer game of the same name. Licensed to and produced by Endemol USA, it premiered on June 13, 2009, during Big Saturday Night airing on GSN, and is hosted by Cat Deeley of So You Think You Can Dance with the voice of Mr. Q provided by Hal Sparks.

== Gameplay ==
The game is divided into four parts.

=== Preliminary game ===
The first part involves members of a randomly selected row of the studio audience. Mr. Q gives a category, and clues to the identity are revealed one at a time. The first contestant to come up with the correct answer qualifies to play the main game. Three qualifiers are determined in each preliminary round.

=== Main game ===
The three players then play the main game head-to-head. The computer gives a category, and then are given a choice of two questions. For example, if the category is Food and Drink, the questions would be "Is it caffeinated?" or "Is it served for breakfast?" A player in control asks either of the two questions, and if the answer is yes, that player retains control of the board; otherwise, s/he loses control. On each turn, after a question has been asked, the player can either choose a question that hasn't been played yet, or ask for a new pair of questions and ask one of those questions. If the player asks for 2 new questions she/he has to choose one of them. Or s/he can choose to attempt to come up with the correct answer. If correct, the player wins the game, $5,000, and a chance to play the semi-final round against the winner of the second main game; a wrong answer loses control.

=== Semi-final ===
In the semi-final round, the players compete one at a time in the same category, with one player (via coin toss) on stage, and the other player offstage in a soundproof isolation booth. The first player is given a category, and then a series of clues. Every few seconds (signaled by two short low-pitched beeps), another clue appears on the screen. The player's objective is to guess the subject using as few clues as possible. The other player then plays the same category and tries to come up with the answer in fewer clues. The player that can figure out the subject with fewer clues wins a prize and goes to the end game.

=== End game ===
In the end game, the player is given a selection of two categories, and the computer must play the game as the contestant asks questions from a provided list of 20. While the computer can attempt to answer at any time, the contestant is only given one chance to guess the answer. At a critical point in the game, the computer goes into "sleep mode" and the host asks the contestant if s/he has any idea what the answer is, after which Mr. Q. awakens from his "nap." If the player buzzes in with the right answer before the computer does, s/he wins $20,000; if the computer is wrong, the human contestant gets one chance to win; should s/he be incorrect or the computer comes up with the right answer first, nothing additional is won.

== Pilot ==
The pilot was taped on August 16, 2008, with Joey Lawrence of Blossom fame, but Deeley replaced Lawrence due to a conflict.

Ken Jennings was featured as the "residential expert", who picked out the categories. The front game was played the same, except losers earned $1,000 for making it on stage, and the winner of the round won $20,000.

In addition, each contestant has a computerized scribble pad that shows the audience the answers they think the person, place, or object could be. The contestants would then buzz-in with their final answer.

Only one game is played; that player went on to the endgame, which was played the same, but before the round the player selected one of 25 balls, each having a covering concealing a number that, should the contestant win the round, would multiply the $20,000 won earlier, up to $500,000.

Finally, the "computer" had a female voice, and was referred to as "Debra-Q".

== International versions ==
Country	Local name	Host	Channel	Year aired
Argentina	Flor de palabra	Florencia Peña	Telefe	August 5 – November 13, 2009
Spain	20p	Josep Lobató	Cuatro	March 30 – July 24, 2009
