= Frog (film) =

- Genre: Fantasy-comedy
- Written by: David Arata; Mark Herder
- Screenplay by: David Arata
- Directed by: David Grossman
- Starring: Scott Grimes; Shelley Duvall; Elliott Gould; Paul Williams
- Music by: Ron Ramin
- Country of origin: United States
- Original language: English

Production
- Executive producer: Shelley Duvall
- Producer: Bridget Terry
- Editor: Jimmy B. Frazier
- Running time: 54 mins
- Production company: WonderWorks

Original release
- Network: PBS
- Release: January 1, 1987

Related
- Frogs! (1991)

Frog is a 1987 American made-for-television fantasy-comedy film produced for the PBS series WonderWorks, starring Scott Grimes, Shelley Duvall, and Elliott Gould.

The central character Arlo Anderson (played by Scott Grimes) is an unpopular youth who is obsessed with his collection of lizards and amphibians. Despite his room already being covered in terrariums & tanks, Arlo cannot pass up the purchase of a large frog seen at a local pet shop. The large frog, the pet shop's recent acquisition from Italy, is named Gus and he fascinates Arlo. Arlo slips Gus into his pocket, as he in on the way to a date at the local movie theatre. The date goes smoothly until Gus escapes Arlo's pocket and begins hopping around onto various girls at the theatre, scaring many & causing a near-panic. Later, after getting Gus home, Arlo is shocked to hear the frog speak to him. Gus explains that he was an Italian prince who was cursed into a frog hundreds of years ago. He believes that only a kiss from a beautiful girl can break the curse, so he & Arlo make a deal to get a kiss for Gus.

Along the way, Gus teaches Arlo how to socialize and woo women by being romantic. As a result, Arlo starts becoming friends with a girl he likes named Suzy, asking her to be his partner for the upcoming science fair. Throughout their preparation for the fair, several awkward situations occur involving Gus, who is impatient to get his kiss and/or not be treated like a frog. Arlo's parents begin to think their son needs psychiatric help, as they keep hearing him talk to himself (really to Gus) while in his bedroom. Whereas Suzy originally agreed to be Arlo's partner so that she could get a good grade in the science fair, she begins to actually like him as they spend more time together. At one point, Gus serenades the two with the song "That's Amore" (with Suzy only later learning it was Gus doing the singing).

During the science fair, a series of events leads to Suzy eventually learning that Gus can speak. In order to help Arlo win (his project is on how frogs communicate), Gus gets to the microphone of the school announcement system and calls for frogs to show up by the dozens. The fair turns to pandemonium, but Suzy figures it out and forces Arlo to explain everything. She agrees to try kissing Gus, but following the incident at the science fair Arlo had let him go near a pond after the two had an argument. Arlo & Suzy sneak out & rush to the pond but do not know which frog is Gus, so Suzy begins picking up and kissing all of the frogs. After a few minutes of this, the kids are interrupted by an officer sent out to look for them. As the police car pulls away, a spot in the pond begins bubbling.

After Arlo's project is praised by the judges of the science fair, the family takes Arlo and Suzy out to eat as celebration. While eating at a local Italian restaurant, a small man comes out onto the stage and says he's going to sing a very special song for two very special people there tonight. As he begins singing "That's Amore", both Arlo and Suzy freeze and look up towards the camera, realizing that the kiss worked and Gus is now the man on the stage.

A sequel to the movie titled Frogs! followed in 1991.

== Cast ==
- Scott Grimes: Arlo Anderson
- Shelley Duvall: Annie Anderson
- Elliott Gould: Bill Anderson
- Paul Williams: Gus
- Amy Lynne: Suzy
- Elizabeth Berkley: Kathy
- Hal Sparks: Jim
