= Dave Harris =

American disc jockey, songwriter and musician

- Harris publicity photo for Retro Rewind
- Born: February 25, 1971 (age 55); Glasgow, Kentucky, U.S.
- Occupations: Disc jockey, songwriter, musician.
- Years active: 1983–2017
- Awards: New Music Weekly (co-writer of Hot AC/AC single of the year for "Sunset Blvd")
- Website: retrorewind.com

Dave Harris (born February 25, 1971) is an American disc jockey, songwriter and musician.

He was born in Glasgow, Kentucky, United States, and hosted the syndicated radio show Retro Rewind in 1999. Harris created Retro Rewind in October 1997. In 1998 Harris briefly took a leave of absence from Retro Rewind to manage the band The Outfield.

Harris is also a songwriter, having penned a Top 20 hit on the Billboard magazine adult contemporary charts in April 2005 called "Sunset Blvd".

In 2015, Harris formed The Dave Harris Project (featuring Michael J. Willett on vocals) which released the album Grandiose Delusions.

In January 2017, Harris was charged with 27 felony counts involving statutory rape and especially aggravated sexual exploitation of a minor. He was convicted of those charges in April 2018.
