= Zoltan (hand gesture) =

Hand gesture from the film Dude, Where's My Car

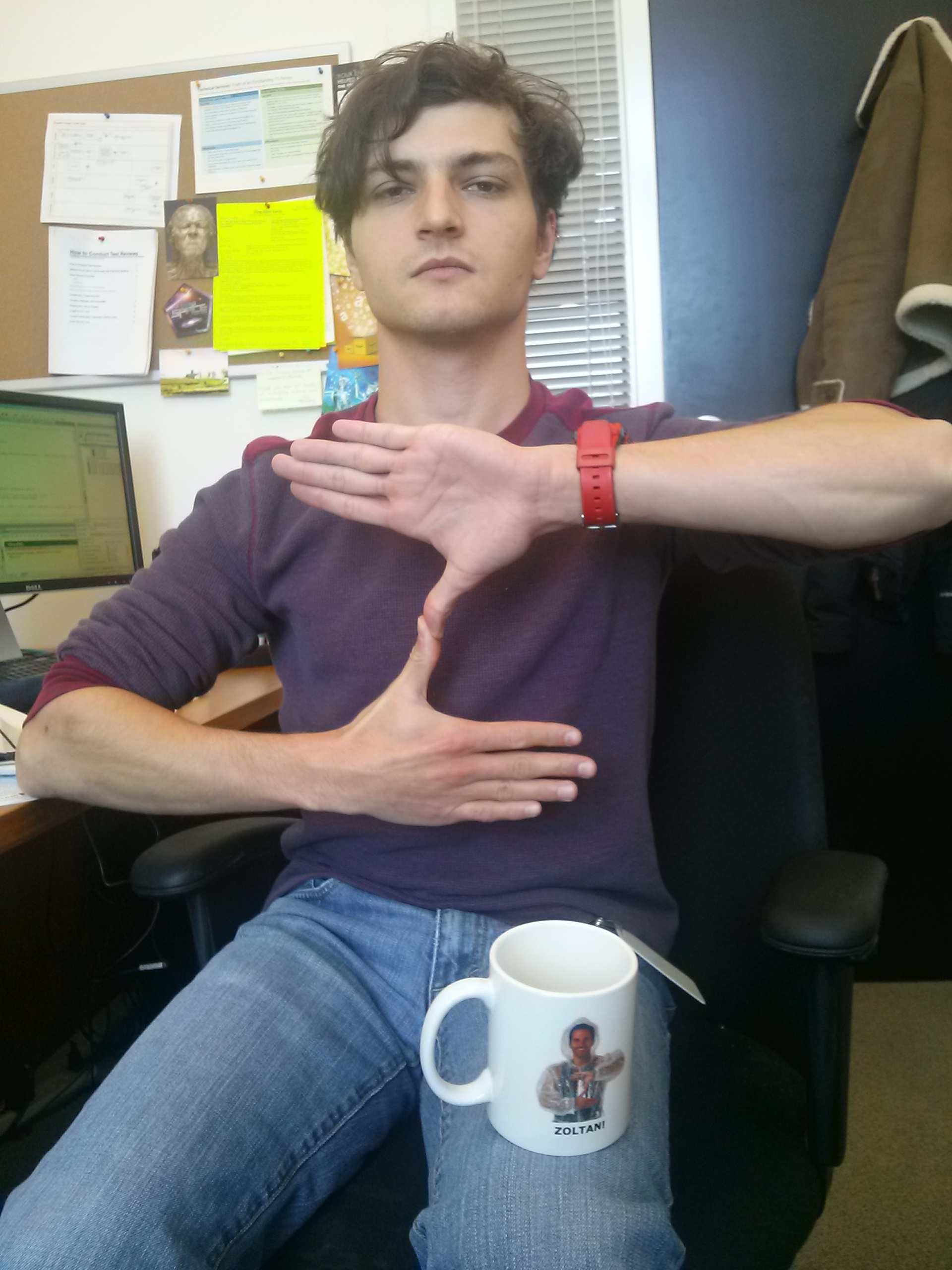
Example of hand gesture

Zoltan is a hand gesture in which a person has their hands stacked on top of each other in order to form a letter "Z". Originally used in the 2000 stoner film Dude, Where's My Car?, the Zoltan hand gesture also became popular in 2012 with members of the Pittsburgh Pirates, as well as residents of Pittsburgh rallying around the team.

== Origins ==
During the film Dude, Where's My Car?, the two main characters, Jesse Montgomery III (Ashton Kutcher) and Chester Greenburg (Seann William Scott), run into a group of UFO cultists led by Zoltan (Hal Sparks). Whenever the name Zoltan was said while they explained their plan to Jesse and Chester they would do the hand gesture. It is during this otherwise minor scene in the film that the Zoltan hand gesture is first used.

== Use in baseball ==
During the early part of the 2012 Major League Baseball season, the Pittsburgh Pirates were visiting the Atlanta Braves for a weekend series when the team was watching Dude, Where's My Car? in the visiting clubhouse at Turner Field. According to Pirates second baseman Neil Walker, the team thought that the Zoltan hand gesture was so bad that they decided to adopt it as a form of team bonding. At the time, the Pirates had endured a major North American professional sports record 19 consecutive losing seasons which, fittingly, started after the Pirates lost to the Braves at Fulton County Stadium in Atlanta in Game 7 of the 1992 National League Championship Series when Francisco Cabrera cracked a bottom-of-the-9th-inning, two-out, two-run single that scored David Justice and Sid Bream.

Soon, the team started using the Zoltan as a way for players to congratulate their teammates after an accomplishment such as a home run or a double play. Over time, Pirates fans noticed the players (in particular, de facto team leader Andrew McCutchen) making the hand gesture and started doing it as well. This led to merchandise sales of t-shirts with the Zoltan on the shirts. After a Twitter campaign to encourage the "real" Zoltan to appear at a game, Hal Sparks flew to Pittsburgh on July 25, 2012, to throw out the ceremonial first pitch, and was on hand to see the Pirates win 3-2 over the Chicago Cubs. Also there to support the team was Hal's girlfriend, Summer Soltis, whose family is from the area and are Pirates fans. Despite picking up a cult following in Pittsburgh and helping the team contend in the playoff race well into September, the Pirates finished with a 79-83 record, extending their major North American professional sports record to 20 consecutive losing seasons.

The Pirates used the Zoltan again the following season, this time not only ending their losing seasons streak but clinching a wild card spot in the 2013 playoffs. The Zoltan was still popular enough in Pittsburgh that when the Pittsburgh Steelers signed Romanian-born punter Zoltán Meskó in September 2013, Meskó declined to do the Zoltan himself for reporters, regarding it as the Pirates' hand signal and not wanting to take it from them (he was released in late October 2013).

== See also ==
- Baseball superstition
- List of gestures
- Rally Monkey
- Terrible Towel
- Z (military symbol)
