= One Ocean View =

2006 American reality television series

One Ocean View is an American primetime reality television series about eleven single New Yorkers looking for romance on Fire Island. It premiered on ABC and CTV on July 31, 2006. The show is similar to The Real World, another series produced by Bunim/Murray Productions, though the cast was only together on weekends, spending their weekdays living their normal lives.

The show's cast of eleven twentysomethings included four men (John, KJ, Usman, and Zack), and seven women (Anelka, Heather, Lauren, Lisa, Mary, Miki, and Radha).

One Ocean View created controversy among the typically publicity-averse residents of Fire Island. The cast and producers were not welcome guests on the island while filming.

The show's premiere garnered a low 1.5/4 rating among those between 18–49. It was dropped from ABC's schedule after attracting only 2.74 million viewers on August 7, 2006, making it ABC's least-watched show for that week.
