= Sunset Blvd (Scott Grimes song) =

Single by Scott Grimes

from the album Livin' on the Run
- Released: January 2005
- Genre: Pop rock, soft rock
- Length: 4:38
- Label: Velocity Records
- Songwriters: Scott Grimes, Dave Harris
- Producer: Tom Fletcher

Scott Grimes singles chronology
"I Don't Even Mind" (1989)	"Sunset Blvd" (2005)	"Livin' on the Run" (2005)

"Sunset Blvd" is a song by Scott Grimes, which appears on his album, Livin' on the Run. The song peaked at number 18 on the Billboard Adult Contemporary chart in April 2005.

The song was featured in a 2007 episode of American Dad! on the Fox Network. Grimes, who does the voice for the teen-aged Steve Smith, sang the song in the episode "American Dream Factory".

== Content ==
The song tells the story of a young man named Brian who has dreams of making it big in Hollywood, eventually succeeding.

== Music video ==
The music video for "Sunset Blvd" was directed by Bryan Pitcher. It stars Jason Gray-Stanford and Grimes and features many of Grimes' family and friends. The song's co-writer, Dave Harris, is seen as a dock worker in the opening sequences to the video. Mickey Jones also appears in the video as the dock supervisor.

== Charts ==
Chart (2005)	Peak position
US Adult Contemporary (Billboard)	18
