= Tuesday Night Book Club =

US television program

Tuesday Night Book Club is a candid reality show that began airing June 13, 2006 on CBS, which delved into the lives of a group of upper-class women in the Phoenix suburb of Scottsdale. It was meant to play as a reality-based version of Desperate Housewives, and the network's response to Bravo's The Real Housewives of Orange County, which originated an evergreen franchise of multiple series. The program was executive produced by Jay Blumenfield and Tony Marsh and produced by The Jay and Tony Show for Magic Molehill Productions, Inc.

The program was set up so that the women of the 'club' were to meet for a discussion of one book a week. However, this was merely a plot device in order to bring the women together in a room, and the book of the week (which was universally a mass market paperback within the chick lit genre) was discussed only sparingly as most of the women didn't even read the suggested title. The episodes instead chronicled the day-to-day drama encountered as the women attempted to raise their children, maintain their households, and satisfy their husbands and continue to maintain their social standings within the community. According to the network, the women (who all knew each other "directly or indirectly" prior to the show's production) would "discuss everything... from sex to spouses to inner-most conflicts" during these weekly 'book club' meetings.

The program ended up with low ratings even for a summer reality program, and CBS canceled program the day after the second episode aired on June 21, 2006. The series pilot received 5 million viewers while the second one barely managed to attract 4 million. The remainder of the series has never been released to any other television network, nor CBS's online video service efforts.

After the cancellation, local newspaper The Arizona Republic, along with skeptical local residents revealed that some of the show's elements were tinkered with by the producers, such as book club members not living in Scottsdale or previously known by the group, and the house used in the meeting was rented by the production company, not a house of one of the members.

== Cast ==
The cast ranged in age from 25 to 46.

- Cris, "The Loyal Wife" Age: 39 Profession: Animal trainer for movies and television
- Sara, "The Party Girl" Age: 26 Profession: Loan manager and aspiring clothing designer
- Jenn, "The Trophy Wife" Age: 38 Profession: Housewife
- Jamie, "The Conflicted Wife" Age: 25 Profession: Salon owner
- Kirin, "The Doctor's Wife" Age: 31 Profession: Housewife, motivational speaker to young girls and former professional model
- Lynn, "The Newlywed" Age: 28 Profession: Speech-language pathologist
- Tina, "The Divorced Mom" Age: 46 Profession: Owns and operates her own marketing business. Former Miss Hawaii USA 1985.
