= Miracle Workers (2006 TV series) =

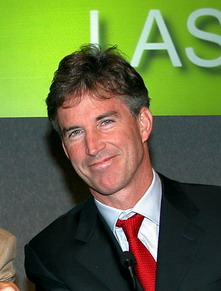
- Dr. Redmond Burke, part of the Miracle Workers cast
- Genre: Reality television; Documentary
- Directed by: Jim Hunziker; Gary Shaffer
- Starring: Redmond Burke; Billy Cohn; Janna Bullock; Tamara Houston
- Music by: Lee Sanders
- Country of origin: United States
- Original language: English
- No. of seasons: 1
- No. of episodes: 5

Production
- Producers: Darryl Frank; Eric Salat; Trice Barto; Matt Cabral; Adam Conger; Jonathan Cornick; Justin Falvey; Kate Fisher; Rebekah Fry; David Garfinkle; Bob Gillan; Chaz Gray; Christine Grund; Missy Hughes; Valerie Levitt; Michael James Nelson; Carrie Pinkman; Dennis Principe Jr.; Jay Renfroe; Jeff Schmalz; Ross Wachsman
- Cinematography: Joel Schwartzberg
- Editor: Devrim Wellman
- Production companies: Renegade 83 Inc. DreamWorks Television

Original release
- Network: ABC
- Release: March 6 – April 3, 2006

Miracle Workers is an American reality television show that aired for one season produced by Jim Hunziker and Gary Shaffer for ABC in 2006. The show features seriously ill people who were unable to afford treatment; the show covered all medical costs, and also documents the results of the treatment.

The show follows the main cast of Drs. Redmond Burke and Billy Cohn along with nurses Janna Bullock and Tamara Houston as they interact with and perform the treatment on different patients every episode.

== Production ==
Produced and aired on ABC, Miracle Workers first premiered on 6 March 2006. The show was set in the United States, with the opening instalment being set at the Cincinnati Eye Institute and Christus St. Joseph Hospital in Houston.

Drs. Redmonde Burke, chief of pediatric cardiovascular at The Congenital Heart Institute at Miami Children’s Hospital and Arnold Palmer Hospital in Florida, and Billy Cohn were already working together before they signed onto “Miracle Workers” as the two main doctors. The show made use of the newest technology along with Burke and Cohn’s professional knowledge to help various patients with their medical conditions.

Each episode is structured in a format where two patients suffering from unique debilitating medical problems are introduced to the viewers. Before getting into the actual treatment and surgery for these patients, “Miracle Workers” provide insight into what the actual conditions are along with how this has impacted the patients’ lives. Afterwards, the surgery process is shown along with the use of special effects to show inside the patient’s bodies and then the result of the surgery.

The cost of the treatments are covered by ABC and CVS pharmacy and the patients who appear on the show are people who have not been able to receive treatment from the US medical system, either due to financial hardship or due to the high costs of surgery for their particular condition.

== Synopsis ==
No. of episode	Title	Original Air Date
1	Heritage/Slaughter	March 6, 2006
The two patients on this episode are Todd Heritage (34), a father of three children and a hospital assistant who has been blind from his youth due to an allergic reaction to penicillin and Vanessa Slaughter, a woman who due to her deteriorating spine and the pain that comes from her condition, has ended up in a wheelchair. After three unsuccessful surgeries on his cornea the show goes through a procedure of curing Heritage by using stem cells from his sister’s cornea along with the cornea and stem cells from a cadaver donor. The first procedure is unsuccessful but a second procedure is carried out in which Heritage regains his sight. His story ends with him seeing his wife and children and going to look at the ocean. Vanessa Slaughter receives a treatment from surgeon Stanley Gertzbein who implants titanium disks into her spine with bones from her hips. Slaughter is told that there is potential of death if a major blood vessel is injured but the major surgery goes successfully. Vanessa is later on seen walking and working in her own flower store.
2	Bresler/Keller	March 13, 2006
The two patients featured on this episode are Emily Bresler, a 19 year old female with Tourette's syndrome and Adrian Keller, a male of 4 years old with scoliosis. Dr. Burke performed a surgery with expanding rods that were approved by the FDA. This resulted in a successful surgery which straightened out the curved spine and prevented Adrian's left lung from being crushed the pressure being exerted by his ribs. For Bresler's treatment, a machine was implanted into her brain which helps in terms of stabilising the electric currents which were disrupted by Tourette's syndrome. Viewers are also informed that Bresler is the 10th person ever to have this procedure implemented on.
3	Brown/Valentino	March 20, 2006
4	Lustig/McInnish	March 27, 2006
5	Arcila/Benoit	April 3, 2006
Priscilla Benoit, a 56 year old female from Lake Charles of Los Angeles appears on the show, suffering from a damaged heart due to chemotherapy for breast cancer. Dr. Cohn treated Benoit by implanting a titanium Jarvik pump which needed to be approved by the FDA. Benoit consented to the treatment after other procedures were deemed ineffective, such as a heart transplant not being an option due to the fact that the patient recently had breast cancer. Benoit is shown at home in early March. Her death after the treatment is explained by Dr. Cohn on camera. The other patient is Arcila, a 4-year-old boy requiring surgery due to the fact that he was born without a complete heart.

== Reception ==
The New York Times gave the show a rating of 5/10 with the positives being that the show is more of a documentary than reality television, which educates viewers on particular conditions and modern interventions. The review also talks about how the show doesn’t explicitly inform viewers on who funds the treatments and how much the actual costs are. Furthermore, it briefly talks about how the show may be hard to watch for those who are squeamish.

Advocacy organization Common Sense Media rated it 4/5, finding that surgical scenes and medical jargon might be unsuitable for small children, while calling it "heart-warming".

The Chicago Tribune gave the show a rating of 7/10 saying that the show is not as graphic compared to other shows in the same genre. The review goes on to say that the stories told on the series are touching whilst also updating the general audience on how medical technology has evolved.

Intersect mentions how medical reality TV programs have raised awareness of unfamiliar illnesses among the greater community who may have not known the conditions or the impact of them on patients’ lives. The show has also been praised for contributing and showing what kinds of new medical interventions are possible.

== Controversy ==
“Miracle Workers” has been at the centre of controversy for a variety of reasons, for seemingly supporting ableist culture, commodifying illnesses and the use of methods which are underdeveloped and not necessarily guaranteed to be safe.

=== Supporting Ableist Culture ===
Disability Studies Quarterly said that the show presents illness and disabilities in a way that supports ableist culture, that life with the conditions that these patients go through can never be as fulfilling or even worth living.

=== Commodification of Illness ===
The show has also been questioned about whether the patients’ medical conditions are being exploited for viewership and revenue whilst depicting the positive results of people who appear on the show while ignoring the suffering of many others who cannot afford treatment. Intersect further adds how U.S. medical reality tv shows like “Miracle Workers” Commodify illness by exposing a vulnerability of someone to the general public for the sake of entertainment and profit.

=== Use of experimental procedures ===
The show has also drawn controversy for its use of new but underdeveloped technology on the patients. The procedures were deemed risky according to Disability Studies Quarterly and questions on whether the lower success rate of the show might have led to only the successful procedures being aired. British Medical Journal adds that although the treatments and procedures used in the show are approved, some of these methods might not be covered under US health insurance companies due to how new and experimental they are.

=== Influence on patient-provider relations ===
According to a research on patient-provider communication, the perspective that medical reality television could have an influence on how the public expect healthcare providers’ communication and procedures to go has been brought forward. Evidence suggests that television programs that portray doctor and patient interactions could lead to viewers having elevated expectations, especially if medical television is the only source of information for certain audiences.

Furthermore, the aforementioned article journal brings up the question of representation on medical reality shows when it comes to race, ethnicity and gender. More specifically, it talks about the lack of the portrayal of women doctors/physicians and minority races.

=== Airing after the death of a patient ===
Questions and concerns occurred amongst viewers about whether it was ethical to broadcast the episode of Priscilla Benoit, days after her death. Robert Thompson raises the question of whether airing the episode was "unseemly to do".

== Positive Impacts ==
BMC Medical Education states that medical reality tv can provide real-life examples of patient care along with technology enhanced strategies. According to the source, a programme of learning was developed using clips from medical reality television such as 24 hours in A&E to provide a mode of case-based learning. Students in this study reacted positively to the use medical reality tv as a realistic and relatable method of teaching along with finding this method of teaching further engaging and memorable, most likely due to the high degree of emotions portrayed throughout.

A review on Miracle Workers by the British Medical Journal talks about how despite the difficulty of getting on the show in the first place and having treatment fully funded through the show, this series has successfully treated the patients who have appeared on the show. The beneficial effects of the treatments carried out on Miracle Workers along with the solution of the illnesses the patients suffer from are shown at the end of each episode.

== Aftermath ==
Priscilla Benoit who appeared on episode 5 of the series, died at age 56 at the Texas Heart Institute, which is a part of Luke's Episcopal Hospital in Houston after suffering from numerous side effects such as a stroke, pneumonia, sepsis and brain haemorrhage. The episode with Benoit was still aired as the executive producers of the series felt a responsibility to portray Benoit's journey along with Dr. Cohn agreeing with the decision to air the episode.

== Additional references ==
- Felicia R. Lee. "Raising Reality-TV Stakes, Show Plans to Offer Medical 'Miracles'." New York Times Published: January 17, 2006
- Heart patient from ‘Miracle Workers’ dies, Today, Mar 30, 2006
