= Survival of the Richest =

US reality television program

- Created by: Alex Ward
- Starring: Hal Sparks
- Country of origin: United States
- No. of seasons: 1
- No. of episodes: 6

Production
- Executive producers: Joe Houlihan; Zad Rogers; Stuart Krasnow
- Running time: 42 minutes

Original release
- Network: The WB
- Release: March 31 – May 5, 2006

Survival of the Richest is an American reality television series on The WB that first aired on March 31, 2006, in which seven "rich kids" who had a combined net worth of over $3 billion were forced to work together with 7 "poor kids" who had a combined debt of $150,000, through a series of challenges to win the grand prize of US$200,000. It was hosted by Hal Sparks.

== Contestants ==
=== Rich kids ===
- Kat Moon, Religious Empire heiress, family worth: $989 million
- Elizabeth Lewis, Yellow Pages heiress, family worth: Over $1 billion
- Hunter Maats, dutch aristocracy, family worth: $20 million
- Liz Rubin, real estate heiress, family worth: $15 million
- Nick Movs, LA socialite & heir to Ritz Carlton Hotel fortune, family worth: $500 million
- Sam Durrani aka Saima Shahnawaz Khan Durrani, family worth: $1 billion
- T.R. Youngblood, auto franchise heir, family worth: $20 million

=== Poor kids ===
- Tracy Huffstetler, nanny, debt: $19,000
- Johanna Allio, single mother, debt: $30,000
- Esmerelda Nuñez, sales clerk, debt: $1,200
- Marcus Foy, unemployed (former competitor on The Janice Dickinson Modeling Agency), debt: $7,000
- Michael Keck, unemployed receptionist, debt: $25,000
- Jacob LeBlanc, construction worker, debt: $35,000
- Jim Perkins, student, debt: $40,000

=== Teams ===
- Nick & Michael (voted off)
- Liz & Marcus (voted off)
- Elizabeth & Tracy (lost in challenge)
- Kat & Esmerelda (voted off)
- Hunter & Johanna (voted off)
- Sammy & Jacob (lost in challenge)
- T.R. & Jim (winners)

== Tasks ==
Episode	Task	Winner	Eliminated
1	Serving at Medieval Times Restaurant	Hunter & Johanna	Kat & Esmerelda
2	Cleaning at Del Mar Race Track	Liz & Marcus	Nick & Michael
3	Picking Peppers	Sammy & Jacob	Elizabeth & Tracey
4	Commercial Fishing	Hunter & Johanna	Liz & Marcus
5	Military tasks	T.R. & Jim	Sammy & Jacob
6	Redesign an L.A. Center	T.R. & Jim	Hunter and Johanna
