= Master of Champions =

- Created by: Tim Crescenti, Yoshiro Yasuoka, Isao Zaitsu, Jonas Larsen, Anthony Ross
- Presented by: Chris Leary; Lisa Dergan
- Judges: Steve Garvey; Oksana Baiul; Jonny Moseley
- Country of origin: United States
- No. of episodes: 6 (one unaired)

Production
- Running time: 60 minutes

Original release
- Network: ABC
- Release: June 22 – July 20, 2006

Master of Champions is a show which began airing June 22, 2006 on ABC. The show format was based on a Nippon Television (NTV) original series entitled World Records. The show was reformatted and produced in the United States by Y27 Entertainment for ABC. The show was hosted by Chris Leary and the co-host was ex-Playboy Playmate Lisa Dergan. The panel of Champions was made of up of baseball legend Steve Garvey, Olympic Gold Medalist for ice skating Oksana Baiul, and Olympic Gold Medalist for skiing Jonny Moseley.

Each week the six contestants compete in unusual skills two at a time. If they compete in the same skill, the one that performed the best is the winner; if they have different skills, the studio audience decides the winner. At the end of the show, the three celebrity judges decide which of the three winners is given the title of Master of Champions and a trophy that is added to the "Wall of Masters".

The show was cancelled on July 20, 2006.

== Masters of Champions ==
Episode 1: 14-year-old contortionist Princess Elayne from Argentina, who hit a target while blindfolded by shooting a bow and arrow with her feet while performing a backbend handstand.

Episode 2: Motorcyclist Chris Florin of Grant, Florida.

Episode 3: Playing card manipulator Rick Smith Jr., who threw cards at over 90 miles per hour (140 km/h) cutting vegetables and candlesticks in half, into the Master of Champions cup 60 feet (18 m) away, and through seven sheets of newspaper.

Episode 4: The "Stupid Fun Club", a Berkeley, California based think tank specializing in robot-people technology, won a Rube Goldberg machine building contest against the current national champions, the "Uber Rubes" from Purdue University.

Episode 5: Billy Matsumoto juggled three lit torches while attempting to break a personal record on the arcade game Dance Dance Revolution.

In an episode that was unaired by ABC, two members of the Harlem Wizards basketball team appeared to do basketball tricks, and Trevor Snowden, a paraplegic mountain bike rider, did tricks on a four-wheeled bike.
