= Scott Grimes =

American actor and singer-songwriter (born 1971)

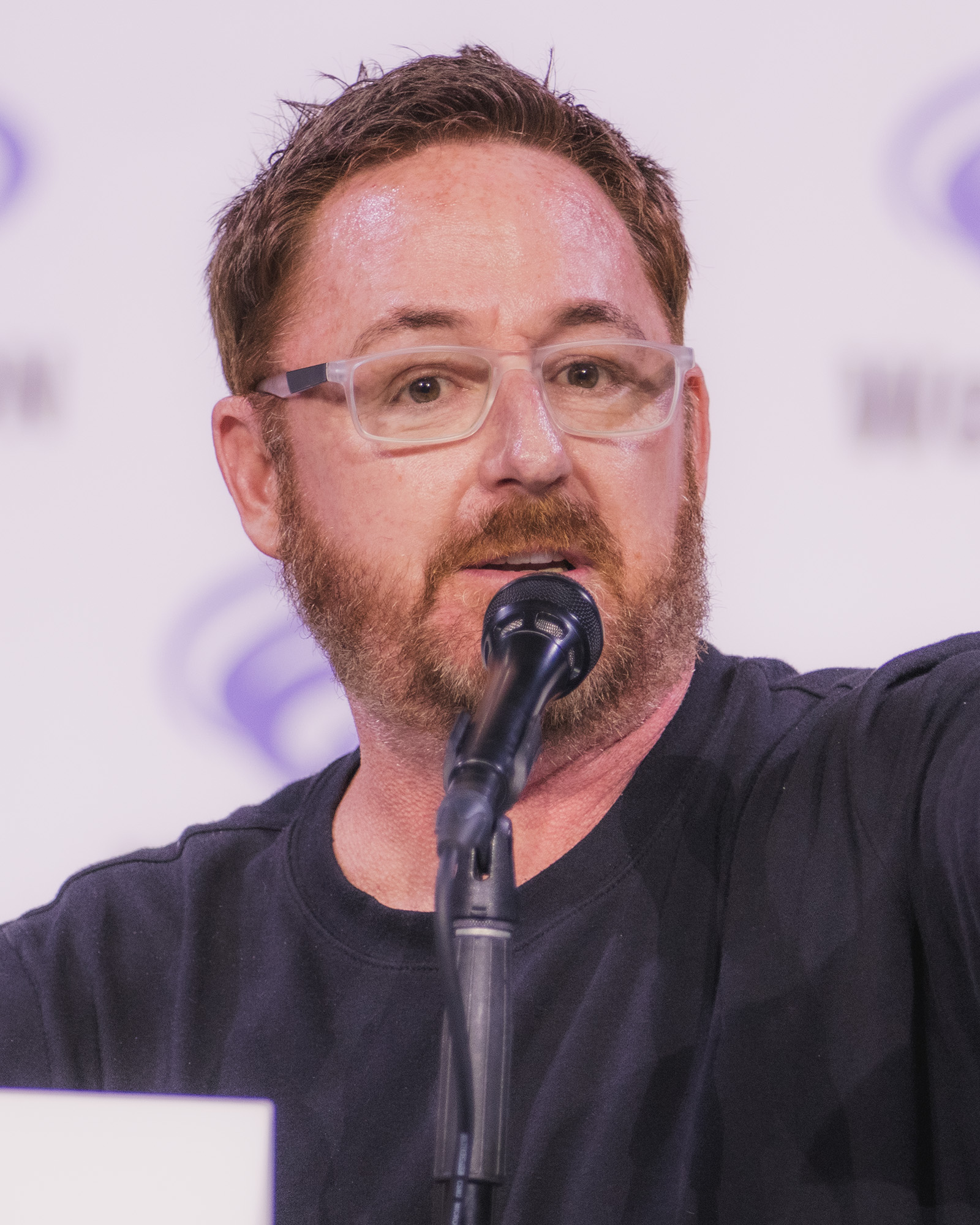
- Grimes in 2026
- Born: Scott Christopher Grimes; July 9, 1971 (age 55); Lowell, Massachusetts, U.S.
- Occupations: Actor, singer
- Years active: 1983–present
- Spouses: Dawn Bailey (m. 1997; div. 2007) Megan Moore (m. 2011; div. 2017) Adrianne Palicki (m. 2019; div. 2020)
- Children: 2
- Relatives: Camryn Grimes (niece)
- Musical career
- Genres: Pop rock, soft rock
- Instrument: Vocals
- Labels: A&M, Velocity, Madjak

Scott Christopher Grimes (born July 9, 1971) is an American actor and singer. He has played Gordon Malloy on the Fox/Hulu sci-fi comedy drama The Orville (2017–2022) and Matty Bennett on the Peacock comedy series Ted (2024–2026). Other roles include appearances in the TV series ER as Dr. Archie Morris, Party of Five as Will McCorkle, Band of Brothers as Technical Sergeant Donald Malarkey, and the animated sitcom American Dad!, voicing Steve Smith. He also played Bradley Brown in the first two Critters films and had roles in the 1984 Christmas TV movies The Night They Saved Christmas and It Came Upon the Midnight Clear.

As a singer, Grimes co-wrote and performed the soft rock single "Sunset Blvd", which peaked at number 18 on Billboard's Adult Contemporary chart in April 2005. He was also one of the four singers in Russell Crowe's band Indoor Garden Party.

== Early life ==
Grimes was born in Lowell, Massachusetts, the son of Pam and Rick Grimes. He lived in Albuquerque, New Mexico, until he was 10, when he moved to Dracut, Massachusetts and attended Dracut Public Schools. His sister, Heather Grimes, is also an actress. He is the uncle of Camryn Grimes, who is known for her roles as Cassie Newman and Mariah Copeland on The Young and the Restless.

== Career ==
Grimes started acting at an early age. In 1984, at age 13, he co-starred with Mickey Rooney in a made-for-TV Christmas movie titled It Came Upon the Midnight Clear. In 1985, he appeared in an episode of the Twilight Zone called "Little Boy Lost".

Grimes also began singing in childhood, and in March 1986 appeared on a Bob Hope TV special Bob Hope's Royal Command Performance from Sweden, singing "Somewhere Over The Rainbow". The special was taped in Sweden with King Carl XVI Gustaf and Queen Silvia in attendance. In 1987, he performed as a guest vocalist on the Time album by Richard Carpenter of the Carpenters, where Carpenter thanked the 15-year-old Grimes for his "spirited" performance on the song "That's What I Believe", commenting in the liner notes, "I believe young Scott to have quite a future in music." Grimes' first music album, Scott Grimes was released by A&M Records in 1989, with the single "I Don't Even Mind" produced by Carpenter. In 2005, he released his second album, Livin' on the Run, and in 2010 his third, Drive.

During the 1986–1987 TV season, Grimes played Jack Randall on the CBS sitcom Together We Stand, which was revamped and retitled Nothing is Easy during its only season on the air. In 1987, Grimes voiced Pinocchio in the dark animated film Pinocchio and the Emperor of the Night. In 1988, he appeared with Dwayne Hickman, Connie Stevens, and her daughter Tricia Leigh Fisher in the TV movie Bring Me the Head of Dobie Gillis; Grimes, Hickman, Stevens, and Fisher also appeared on the All-Star Super Password Special with Bert Convy. He had also guest starred on the NBC sitcom Wings. He is also known for his 1987 recurring role on Who's the Boss as Alyssa Milano's character's love interest Chad McCann, and his regular appearances in the 1994–2000 series Party of Five as Will McCorkle.

Grimes appeared as Sergeant Donald Malarkey in the HBO mini series Bands of Brothers in 2001.

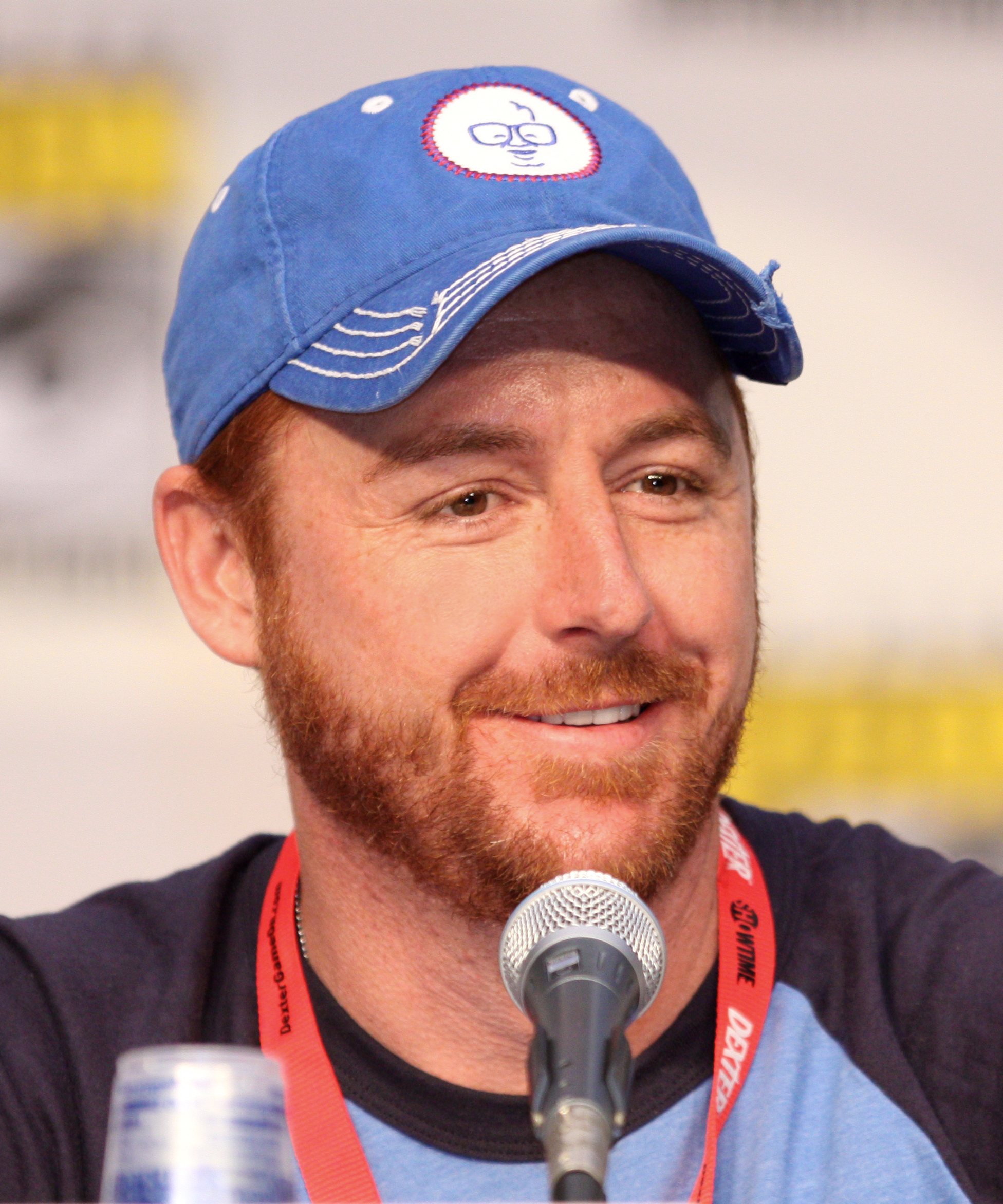
Grimes in 2010

Grimes starred on the NBC series ER playing Dr. Archie Morris from 2003 until the series' end in 2009. Initially a recurring character on ER, he later was upgraded to a main role in season 12. The character initially provided comic relief, but grew over the years, becoming central to several episodes and story lines in the series' final seasons.

Since 2005, Grimes has voiced Steve Smith in the American animated sitcom American Dad! He has also voiced the recurring characters Midget Assassin and Frat Guy, as well as several additional characters, each of whom appear in only one episode.

Grimes' film credits include the dark comedy Who's Your Monkey and Ridley Scott's Robin Hood with Russell Crowe and Cate Blanchett. On October 11, 2010, Grimes announced on his Twitter that he would voice a character on the animated series Family Guy, which would turn out to be Joe Swanson's previously thought-to-be-dead son, Kevin Swanson. On March 19, 2013, he was cast as Dave Flynn on the NCIS: Los Angeles episode entitled Red, the first episode of a two-part backdoor pilot to another NCIS spin-off which would have been named NCIS: Red, but it was not picked up. Grimes had previously appeared in an NCIS episode entitled "Baltimore" in 2011 as Detective Danny Price, Anthony DiNozzo's former partner at the Baltimore P.D.

From 2017 to 2022, he played helmsman Gordon Malloy, the best friend of Captain Ed Mercer (Seth MacFarlane) on the Fox/Hulu sci-fi comedy drama The Orville, created by executive producer MacFarlane.

== Personal life ==
Grimes has a son and a daughter with his first wife, Dawn Bailey-Grimes, whom he married on May 5, 1997. In December 2011, he married Megan Moore. She filed for divorce in October 2017. At San Diego Comic-Con in 2018, it was revealed that he was dating his Orville co-star Adrianne Palicki. The two announced their engagement in January 2019, and married in Austin, Texas, on May 19, 2019. Two months later, in July 2019, Palicki filed for divorce, but had it dismissed in November. The couple separated again in June 2020, with Palicki again filing for divorce in July.

== Filmography ==
=== Film ===
Year	Title	Role	Notes
1986	Critters	Brad Brown	
1987	Pinocchio and the Emperor of the Night	Pinocchio	Voice role
1988	Critters 2: The Main Course	Brad Brown	
1989	Night Life	Archie Melville	
1991	Letters from the Heart	Schroder	
1995	Crimson Tide	Petty Officer Hilaire	
1999	Mystery, Alaska	Brian "Birdie" Burns	
2002	Couples	Owen	
2003	Dreamkeeper	Tehan/Red-Headed Stranger	
2004	To Kill a Mockumentary	Jerry	
2005	Inside the CIA	Steve Smith	Short film
2007	Who's Your Monkey	Mark	
2010	Robin Hood	Will Scarlet	
2014	Winter's Tale	Carriage Driver	
2015	Pearly Gates	Richard Whiner	
2023	Oppenheimer	Counsel	

=== Television ===
Year	Title	Role	Notes
1984	A Doctor's Story	Charles Wickes	Television film
1984	The Night They Saved Christmas	David Baldwin	Television film
1984	It Came Upon the Midnight Clear	Robbie Westin	Television film
1985	Hotel	Josh Gilmour	Episode: "Detours"
1985	The Twilight Zone	Kenny	Episode: "Little Boy Lost"
1986	The Greatest Adventure: Stories from the Bible	Yasha	Voice role; episode: "The Nativity"
1986	Wildfire	Bobbo	Voice role; episode: "A Visit to Wonderland"
1986–1987	Who's the Boss?	Chad McCann	2 episodes
1986–1987	Together We Stand	Jack Randall	19 episodes
1986–1987	Potato Head Kids	Slick	Voice role; 11 episodes
1987	Foofur	Additional voices	Voice role; 13 episodes
1987	Popeye and Son	Additional voices	Voice role; 10 episodes
1988	Frog	Arlo Anderson	Television film
1988	Bring Me the Head of Dobie Gillis	Georgie Gillis	Television film
1988	Charles in Charge	Gary Marlin	Episode: "Sarah Steps Out"
1989	Star Trek: The Next Generation	Eric	Episode: "Evolution"
1990	My Two Dads	Jordan	Episode: "Power Struggle"
1990	21 Jump Street	Christopher	Episode: "Buddy System"
1992	Wings	Marty	Episode: "Noses Off"
1993	The Legend of Prince Valiant	Eric	Voice role; episode: "The Parting"
1993	Frogs!	Arlo Anderson	Television film
1994	Birdland	Scott McKenzie	2 episodes
1994–2000	Party of Five	Will McCorkle	70 episodes
1996–1997	Goode Behavior	Garth	22 episodes
2001	First Years	Seth Kolatch	Episode: "...And Then You Die"
2001	Band of Brothers	Sergeant 1st Class Donald Malarkey	10 episodes
2003–2009	ER	Dr. Archie Morris	112 episodes
2005–present	American Dad!	Steve Smith/various voices	Voice role; 366 episodes
2010	Dexter	Alex Tilden	Episode: "In the Beginning"
2011	NCIS	Detective Danny Price	Episode: "Baltimore"
2011	Harry's Law	ADA Ben	Episode: "Purple Hearts"
2011–2020	Family Guy	Kevin Swanson/Michael Pulaski/Michael Bublé	Voice role; 13 episodes
2012	Suits	Thomas Walsh	Episode: "All In"
2012–2014	Republic of Doyle	Jimmy O'Rourke	4 episodes
2013	Criminal Minds	Donnie Bidwell	Episode: "Carbon Copy"
2013–2017	NCIS: Los Angeles	Special Agent Dave Flynn	3 episodes
2014	Shameless	Doctor Zabel	Episode: "Iron City"
2014	A Lesson in Romance	Mike Mills	Television film
2014	The Santa Con	John Guthrie	Television film
2015	Justified	Seabass	6 episodes
2016	Law & Order: Special Victims Unit	Thomas Zimmerman	Episode: "Sheltered Outcasts"
2017–2022	The Orville	Lieutenant Gordon Malloy	36 episodes
2024–2026	Ted	Matty Bennett	15 episodes
2026	Ted: The Animated Series	Matty Bennett	

=== Video games ===
Year	Title	Role	Notes
2022	Warped Kart Racers	Steve Smith	Archival Recording

== Discography ==
=== Albums ===
- 1989: Scott Grimes (A&M/PolyGram)
- 2005: Livin' on the Run (Velocity)
- 2010: Drive (Madjak)

=== Singles ===
Year	Single	Chart Positions	Album
Year	Single	US AC	Album
1989	"I Don't Even Mind"	34	Scott Grimes
1989	"Show Me the Way to Your Heart"	—	Scott Grimes
2005	"Sunset Blvd"	18	Livin' on the Run
2005	"Livin' on the Run"	34	Livin' on the Run

== Awards and nominations ==
Year	Award	Category	Work	Result	Ref.
1985	Young Artist Award	Exceptional Performance By a Young Actor in a Television Special or Mini-Series	It Came Upon the Midnight Clear	Nominated	
1986	Young Artist Award	Exceptional Performance by a Young Actor Starring in a Feature Film – Comedy or Drama	Critters	Nominated	
1986	Young Artist Award	Exceptional Performance by a Young Actor in a New Television Comedy or Drama Series	Together We Stand	Nominated	
1987	Young Artist Award	Exceptional Performance by a Young Actor in a Television Comedy Series	Nothing Is Easy	Nominated	
1987	Young Artist Award	Outstanding Young Actor/Actress/Ensemble in Animation Voice-Over (Note: Young Artist Award nomaination shared with Ian Fried, Susie Garbo, Christina Lange, Scott Menville, Kellie Martin, Anne Marie McEvoy, David Mendenhall, Breckin Meyer and Laura Moone.)	Potato Head Kids	Nominated	
1987	Saturn Awards	Best Performance by a Younger Actor	Critters	Nominated	
1989	Young Artist Award	Best Young Actor Guest-Starring in a Syndicated Family Comedy, Drama, or Special	Frog	Nominated	
1989	Young Artist Award	Most Promising Young Vocal Recording Artist: Actor	—N/a	Nominated	
1991	Young Artist Award	Outstanding Hosts for a Youth Variety or Game Show (Note: Young Artist Award nomination shared with Jason Hervey.)	Wide World of Kids	Nominated	
