= Celebrity Cooking Showdown =

- Title card
- Created by: Glenn Gordon Caron
- Starring: Alan Thicke; Alison Sweeney; Chelsea Cooley; Tony Gonzales; Big Kenny; Patti LaBelle; Gabrielle Reece; Tom Arnold; Ashley Parker Angel
- Country of origin: United States
- No. of seasons: 1
- No. of episodes: 4

Production
- Executive producers: Sean "Diddy" Combs; David A. Hurwitz; Ben Silverman
- Running time: 60 minutes
- Production companies: Bill's Market & Television Productions; Bad Boy Films; Reveille Productions

Original release
- Network: NBC
- Release: April 17 – April 22, 2006

Celebrity Cooking Showdown is a program that aired on NBC from April 17–19 and April 22, 2006. It was hosted by Alan Thicke.

== Format ==
The competition was divided into three "preliminary rounds", where each celebrity was paired with a famous chef. The three chefs participating were Wolfgang Puck, Cat Cora and Govind Armstrong, all of whom had been on Food Network's Iron Chef America. The program's host was Alan Thicke; early articles on the show stated that Food Network host and author Sandra Lee would serve as co-host, but she never appeared on the program when it aired. Following a montage of clips showing the chefs teaching their new pupils the ropes, the actual contest would begin.

Each contestant had to prepare three dishes (an appetizer, a main course and a dessert) within 50 minutes. To aid them, after the second commercial break had passed (roughly 15–20 minutes into the contest) each team was allowed two "chef's passes" (one by the chef and one by the contestant). In order to activate the chef's pass, either the contestant or the chef must place their towel into a wire basket just outside the kitchen area. A horn as if to end a hockey period would go off, and this would allow the chef to come into the kitchen for two minutes and assist the contestant. Only one chef could be in the kitchen area on a chef's pass at a time. Also, when only five minutes remains in the contest, the chefs are allowed to return for whatever last-minute advice and help they can give.

As a disadvantage for each contestant, two ingredients for their dishes are not in their kitchen area. Instead, they are kept in the pantry located on an elevated stage behind where the chefs stand. Once the contestant realizes that the ingredients are missing, they must run over and find them in the pantry.

When time runs out, the judges (event planner Colin Cowie and food critic Gael Greene) evaluate the final product. In order for a dish to be considered, it must be finished and on the judge's platform when the clock hits zero. The judges then evaluate each meal on a scale of 1-10 using two criteria: flavor and presentation. Each judge can give a maximum of 20 points, so a perfect score for a contestant would be 40.

The top winner from each preliminary round advanced to the final round. However, due to low ratings in head-to-head competition with shows like NCIS, Gilmore Girls and American Idol, NBC pulled the plug before the finals were aired due to very dismal ratings (the Tuesday and Wednesday editions finished an embarrassing fifth out of the six broadcast networks in their 8:00 time slots). The network originally announced the two episodes would be available only on nbc.com, and the Thursday night (Day 4) episode was available to watch on NBC.com until the time it would have ended airing in the Pacific Time Zone (9pm PDT/12am EDT). NBC later reversed its decision not to broadcast the final episodes and ran them back-to-back on the night of Saturday April 22, though only those who watched the final round on NBC.com were able to vote on the outcome.

== Celebrities participating ==
- Alison Sweeney (Days of Our Lives)
- Chelsea Cooley (Miss USA 2005)
- Cindy Margolis (Actress/Model)
- Tony Gonzalez (Tight End, NFL's Kansas City Chiefs)
- Big Kenny (Half of Country Music Duo Big & Rich)
- Patti LaBelle (Singer)
- Gabrielle Reece (Former professional beach volleyball player)
- Tom Arnold (Actor/Comedian)
- Ashley Parker Angel (Singer)
- Colin Cowie (Celeb Party Planner) Served as a judge on the show.

== Results ==
On Monday, April 17, the three contestants were Cindy Margolis (paired with Wolfgang), Tony Gonzalez (paired with Cat) and Alison Sweeney (paired with Govind). In a 34-33 decision, Cindy's menu of Chinois chicken salad, pan-seared Szechuan beef and baked Alaska narrowly edged out Tony's Caprese salad tower, Penne alla vodka with salmon and affogato Italian sundae. Alison's menu of marinated lobster, blue cheese-stuffed tenderloin and citrus crepes finished a close third with 31 points. Alison also suffered a burned hand when she grabbed a hot metal saucepan without a mitt.

On Tuesday, April 18, the pairings were Ashley Parker Angel and Wolfgang, Patti LaBelle and Cat, and Gabrielle Reece and Gorvind. Ashley's choices of curried chicken and shrimp satays with peanut sauce, vegetarian pizza with wild mushrooms and pesto, and caramelized lemon crème brûlée with fresh berries defeated Patti's black-eyed pea croquettes with spicy aioli and dandelion greens tasso ham, blackened shrimp and grits with spring asparagus petite salad and coconut cake with raspberries by a final score of 36-34. Gabrielle finished a distant third, her meal of tuna tartare with Crispy nori and fresh wasabi, dover sole with artichoke purée, green beans, and marinated tomatoes, d'Anjou Napoleon with spiced cranberry reduction scoring 26 points.

On Wednesday, April 19, the pairings were Tom Arnold with Wolfgang, Chelsea Cooley with Cat and Big Kenny with Govind. Chelsea's menu of charred Kobe-style beef with Asian pear slaw and honey-miso vinaigrette, spicy tuna belly and asparagus roll with wasabi crème fraîche, and green tea parfait with kiwi and cashews eked out a 35-34-34 victory over Tom's scalloped corn casserole with apple smoked bacon, prime beef burgers with Gorgonzola and special sauce, molten chocolate cake with whipped cream and Kenny's dungeness crab with white asparagus and hazelnut vinaigrette, seared Kobe-style beef with potato mousseline and chanterelle mushroom salad and fried cookies and cream.

The finals, broadcast over both NBC.com's website and on television on April 22, paired Cindy with Wolfgang, Ashley with Cat, and Chelsea with Govind. For this round, the contestants were paired up with their chefs by random draw and given just one day to practice their dishes. The competition started badly as Ashley sliced open his hand with a knife while cutting limes. The laceration was severe and required paramedic attention to apply a temporary bandage (he later needed stitches to seal up the wound) and cost him nearly 5 minutes of his 50. Cindy later burned her hand while pulling out her rack of lamb. Cindy's menu consisted of roasted beet napoleon with goat cheese, marinated rack of lamb and butterscotch apple crumble. Chelsea's menu was hamachi sashimi, duck breast with spicy soba noodles and jasmine rice pudding (and a cold bottle of sake). Ashley's menu was coconut ceviche, tequila lime steak fajitas and Mexican chocolate fondue. Each judge weighed in, but withheld scores so that America could vote on the winner. Cindy won the competition.

== Home viewer contest ==
Every night during Celebrity Cooking Showdown, one viewer won a 4-piece GE kitchen. All viewers had to do to enter the contest was to send a text with a letter that corresponded to the celebrity they thought would win over the judges. As with the Deal Or No Deal Lucky Case Game, only the correct guesses were entered into the contest. From there, the winner was picked amidst the correct guesses.
