= 2006 in American television =

In American television in 2006, notable events include television show debuts, finales, cancellations, and new channel initiations.

== Notable events ==
=== January ===
Date	Event
1	The final episode of the original NFL Primetime airs on ESPN, followed by the network's final Sunday Night Football game.
2	After several years as part of The WB's weekday programming lineup, the network ends its weekday afternoon Kids' WB block, which gained an extra hour on Saturday mornings. Daytime WB is launched in Kids' WB's former weekday timeslots.
4	The Rose Bowl Game between the Texas Longhorns and USC Trojans is broadcast on ABC. Now considered by many to not only be the greatest college football national championship game of all time, but the greatest Division 1-A college football game ever played, this Rose Bowl also has the distinction of being the final game ever called by longtime broadcaster Keith Jackson. It was also the final Rose Bowl to be telecast under ABC Sports branding; the 2007 Rose Bowl would be an ESPN on ABC presentation.
12	Dari Alexander (anchor of afternoon portions of Fox News Live on weekends) and Rick Folbaum (anchor of Fox Report Weekend) are transferred from Fox News Channel to the Fox flagship station WNYW/New York City. They are replaced by Jamie Colby and Trace Gallagher, respectively (the latter effective on February 4, when the network introduced the weekend editions of Studio B). Folbaum, however, would return to the network in 2009.
12	The second live episode of the program Will & Grace is broadcast by NBC on both the East and West coasts of the United States.
14	The NHL on NBC returned for the first time since broadcasting the 1994 NHL All-Star Game, featuring a regional tripleheader. It marked NBC's first non-All-Star Game broadcast of the NHL since the 1975 Stanley Cup Finals.
24	CBS Corporation and Warner Bros. announce the initiation of The CW Television Network for the 2006–2007 season. This network is, in a sense, a merger of The WB and UPN and is designed to replace both of those networks.
24	NFL player Bob Griese donated a total of $114,310 (including the standard $100,000 grand prize) on his appearance in Wheel of Fortune to his charity for Judi's House (founded by his son Brian, also an NFL alumnus). The winning puzzle, "Brains and Brawn", would later be reprised on December 16, 2010, where another contestant, Hillary Light, solved the exact same puzzle with a similar result.
28	The Directors Guild of America name Tony Croll and J. Rupert Thompson as best reality television directors for the programs Three Wishes and Fear Factor, respectively. Best director of a dramatic series is Michael Apted for Rome. Television comedy series director is Marc Buckland for My Name Is Earl. Directors Joseph Sargent (Warm Springs) and George C. Wolfe (Lackawanna Blues) share best television movie awards. General Hospital's Owen Renfroe is named best daytime television serial director.
29	World News Tonight co-anchor Bob Woodruff and ABC News cameraman Doug Vogt are injured.

=== February ===
Date	Event
2	Mad Linx returns to host Rap City after a four-month absence, while J-Nicks leaves the show to work as a radio DJ.
5	After 36 years, ABC broadcasts its final National Football League game when the Pittsburgh Steelers defeat the Seattle Seahawks 21–10 in Super Bowl XL. NFL football will not be seen on the network for 9 years until January 9, 2016, and again on January 7, 2017.
22	Fox announces plans for a new network, named MyNetworkTV. The network was planned to be broadcast by UPN and The WB affiliates not included in the initiation of The CW.
28	The Bold and the Beautiful actor Jack Wagner along with contestant Christine Denos won $142,550 in Wheel of Fortune, setting a record for its one-episode winnings total in the show, and the second-largest winnings record since Peter Argyropolous and Deborah Cohen in 1996. Both of these records would later be first surpassed on October 14, 2008, when Michelle Lowenstein won $1,026,080.

=== March ===
Date	Event
20	Meg Oliver is named the new anchor of CBS News' Up to the Minute, replacing Melissa McDermott.
26	The last first-run episodes to date of the long-running TV series Soul Train air in syndication. Reruns of the previous season are broadcast until October, when "The Best of Soul Train" reruns from the 1970s and 1980s begin being broadcast instead of new episodes.

=== April ===
Date	Event
1	The Kids' Choice Awards ceremony is broadcast by Nickelodeon, with host Jack Black and featuring Robin Williams as the unfortunate victim of the network's trademark slime.
28	The 33rd Daytime Emmy Awards ceremony is broadcast by ABC.

=== May ===
Date	Event
21	A pair of finales: On CBS, Mike Wallace makes his last appearance on 60 Minutes, while the WB airs the series finale of Charmed, "Forever Charmed", ending the series after eight seasons.
24	On Fox, Taylor Hicks wins American Idol season five.
25	A press conference by President George W. Bush and Prime Minister Tony Blair, the broadcast aired live simultaneously on C-SPAN, as well as several local FOX, ABC, NBC, affiliates and CNN, MSNBC and Fox News. The combined ratings for these broadcasts coincidentally made the event one of the most-watched events in every single media market in Georgia, Alabama, Tennessee, South Carolina, Wyoming, South Dakota, North Dakota, Indiana, Idaho, Wisconsin, New Jersey and the Pennsylvania regions of Northwestern Pennsylvania, Greater Pittsburgh, Northeastern Pennsylvania and South Central Pennsylvania.
31	Katie Couric's final episode as co-host of the Today Show airs on NBC.

=== June ===
Date	Event
9	Richard Karn hosted his final episode of Family Feud. He would replaced by John O'Hurley on September 11.
28	After 19 years, Charles Gibson's final episode as co-host of Good Morning America airs on ABC.

=== July ===
Date	Event
3	In anticipation of the launch of MyNetworkTV in September, Fox affiliate WUFX (now WLOO) and WB affiliate WDBD swap affiliations, returning Fox to WDBD after a 5-year absence and clearing the way for WUFX's impending switch to MyNetworkTV.
10	Terrence and Rocsi, winners from BET's "New Faces" talent search, become the new hosts of 106 & Park, replacing the temporary hosts Big Tigger and Julissa.
24	The pilot for Aquaman, previously not broadcast, becomes available for download on the iTunes Music Store.

=== August ===
Date	Event
14	Rap City host Mad Linx quits the show and is replaced by Q45.
21	Stargate SG-1 is canceled officially by Sci Fi after the premiere broadcast of the show's 200th episode after just five low-rated episodes. The tenth, and possibly final, season makes the show the longest broadcast science fiction series in American television history.
25	The Cheetah Girls 2, a sequel to The Cheetah Girls premieres on the Disney Channel and becomes the highest-rated Disney Channel original movie at that time, with ratings more than 8.1 million, exceeding that of High School Musical.
27	The NBC comedy The Office wins Outstanding Comedy Series and the Fox drama 24 also wins for Outstanding Drama Series at the 58th Primetime Emmy Awards on NBC.
31	After one year on the show, Bob Schieffer's final episode as an anchor of CBS Evening News airs.

=== September ===
Date	Event
2	ESPN takes over production of ABC Sports broadcasts, rebranding them as ESPN on ABC. Both networks are owned by The Walt Disney Company.
5	On CBS, Katie Couric becomes the first female sole anchor of the CBS Evening News, replacing the temporary anchor Bob Schieffer.
6	The longest-broadcast television drama program, Guiding Light, broadcasts its 15,000th televised episode on CBS.
7	NBC broadcast its first NFL regular season or playoff game since Super Bowl XXXII in 1997, taking over the rights to the NFL Kickoff Game. Three days later, it broadcast its first regular season Sunday Night Football game.
9	Qubo debuts as a Saturday morning block on NBC as well as a Spanish-dubbed version on Telemundo and a Friday afternoon programming block on i: Independent Television. The block is broadcast on Saturdays and a Spanish block on Saturdays and Sundays on NBC and Telemundo. The block replaced two former weekend morning blocks on NBC and Telemundo - Discovery Kids on NBC and Telemundo Kids.
9	KOHD in Bend, Oregon signs on the air, giving the Bend market its first full-time ABC affiliate.
11	Wheel of Fortune and Jeopardy! become the first game shows to be broadcast in High Definition.
11	John O'Hurley replaces Richard Karn as the host of Family Feud.
12	On CBS, Mike Malin is named the winner of Big Brother: All-Stars and wins the $500,000 prize. Runner-Up Erika Landin wins $50,000.
12	Fox officially shuts down Foxnet, a cable service for television markets that did not have a local Fox affiliate. This prompts stations in the few markets that still carry Foxnet to launch Fox-affiliated subchannels: CBS affiliate WAGM-TV in Presque Isle, Maine moves its affiliation to DT2 on this day and joins Fox. Meanwhile, in Bowling Green, Kentucky, ABC affiliate WBKO-TV launches a Fox-affiliated DT2 subchannel at around the same time, returning Fox to Bowling Green for the first time since Fox left now-NBC affiliate WNKY in 2001 in a dispute.
13	Meredith Vieira begins co-hosting duties of the NBC program Today, replacing Katie Couric.
13	Two new Fox affiliates hit the air due to the shutdown of Foxnet. In the Beckley-Bluefield-Oak Hill area, Lewisburg-based CBS affiliate WVNS-TV adds a Fox affiliation on its DT2 subchannel, returning Fox to the market for the first time since WVNS-TV itself dropped the network in 2001 to join CBS (and giving the area in-market affiliates of all four major commercial broadcast networks). Meanwhile, in the Mississippi Delta, Greenville-based ABC affiliate WABG-TV also launches a Fox affiliation on its DT2 subchannel.
16	Following the Viacom/CBS split, the Nick Jr. on CBS block is replaced by KOL Secret Slumber Party, a female-oriented Saturday morning block produced by DIC Entertainment. Rebrandings took place a year later when it became KEWLopolis, and Cookie Jar TV in the fall of 2009 after Cookie Jar Entertainment purchased DIC.
18	Vickyann Sadowski wins $147,517 worth of cash and prizes for her performance on the season 35 premiere of The Price Is Right on CBS. This not only made Sadowski (at the time) the biggest winner of the daytime show's history, it also surpassed Press Your Luck contestant Michael Larson, making her then-the biggest one day winner in the history of American network daytime game shows in general (Sadowski's record has since surpassed by five other contestants as of 2019, with the first being Sheree Heil on December 30, 2013, who won $170,345; the current record holder was Michael Stouber on October 14, 2019, who won $262,743).
20	Top Gear presenter Richard Hammond is seriously injured after crashing a jet-powered car at 280 mph.
25	Fox & Friends co-anchor E.D. Hill quits the show and is replaced by Gretchen Carlson.

=== October ===
Date	Event
19	NBC Universal announces a major restructuring is in order to save US$750 million after several years of decreasing ratings. Among the changes is the announcement that NBC will no longer broadcast scripted dramas or comedies during the first hour of prime time, emphasizing instead less-expensive reality and game shows during those hours. Its news division is also trimmed. The announcement is made despite the early success of several new NBC series such as Heroes.
26	Wheel of Fortune introduced a new gameplay element called Wild Card which allows contestants to play an extra letter on the same cash value it landed on (the card was not used until November 20 episode), or providing an extra, fourth consonant in the Bonus Round (this was first used on November 15 episode).
27	Game 5 of the World Series is broadcast on Fox. The St. Louis Cardinals defeat the Detroit Tigers, winning their first title since 1982.
31	Bob Barker announces that he will be retiring from his hosting duties for The Price Is Right after 35 years in June 2007.

=== November ===
Date	Event
9	Nickelodeon broadcasts a 24-hour marathon of SpongeBob SquarePants starting at 8:00 PM leading to a new episode and the basic cable premiere of The SpongeBob SquarePants Movie the following day. The marathon increased Nickelodeon's ratings to an average of more than 6.7 million viewers and became the network's highest-rated day ever.
16	On ABC's General Hospital, Luke and Laura Spencer remarry to celebrate the 25th anniversary of their first nuptials, which was the highest-rated hour in U.S. daytime television history.

=== December ===
Date	Event
5	The 2006 Victoria's Secret Fashion Show is broadcast on CBS. 6.8 million people tune in.

== Programs ==
=== Shows debuting in 2006 ===
Date	Show	Network
January 1	In Justice	ABC
January 1	Flavor of Love	VH1
January 2	It's a Big Big World	PBS Kids
January 2	Lunar Jim	TLC
January 5	Dallas SWAT	A&E
January 5	Four Kings	NBC
January 6	The Book of Daniel	NBC
January 7	Weekends with Maury and Connie	MSNBC
January 8	Campus Ladies	Oxygen
January 11	South Beach	UPN
January 12	Crumbs	ABC
January 17	Love Monkey	CBS
January 18	Skating with Celebrities	Fox
January 22	Number 1 Single	E!
January 23	Courting Alex	CBS
January 27	The Emperor's New School	Disney Channel
February 7	Get This Party Started	UPN
February 20	Power Rangers Mystic Force	Toon Disney
February 25	Kappa Mikey	Nicktoons
March 1	Free Ride	Fox
March 3	Conviction	NBC
March 3	Wonder Pets!	Nick Jr.
March 7	8th & Ocean	MTV
March 7	The Unit	CBS
March 7	Sons & Daughters	ABC
March 12	Big Love	HBO
March 13	The New Adventures of Old Christine	CBS
March 15	The Loop	Fox
March 16	American Inventor	ABC
March 17	Modern Men	The WB
March 22	Heist	NBC
March 22	The Evidence	ABC
March 22	Unan1mous	Fox
March 24	Hannah Montana	Disney Channel
March 28	Teachers	NBC
March 28	Thief	FX
March 29	The Bedford Diaries	The WB
March 31	Survival of the Richest	The WB
April 2	So NoTORIous	VH1
April 3	Call to Greatness	MTV
April 3	Yo Momma	MTV
April 4	Pepper Dennis	The WB
April 6	PlayMania	Game Show Network
April 9	Just for Kicks	Nickelodeon
April 11	At the Poocharelli's	Nick at Nite
April 16	What About Brian	ABC
April 17	Celebrity Cooking Showdown	NBC
April 18	Mega Movers	History
May 2	Blowin' Up	MTV
May 5	Mickey Mouse Clubhouse	Playhouse Disney
May 29	Squirrel Boy	Cartoon Network
May 29	Fetch! with Ruff Ruffman	PBS Kids Go!
May 31	The Hills	MTV
May 31	Gameshow Marathon	CBS
June 2	Beyond the Break	Noggin (during "The N" block)
June 6	The Janice Dickinson Modeling Agency	Oxygen
June 8	Windfall	NBC
June 10	The Adventures of Chico and Guapo	MTV2
June 10	Where My Dogs At?	MTV2
June 10	Disney Channel Games	Disney Channel
June 11	Lucky Louie	HBO
June 12	Saved	TNT
June 13	WWE ECW	Sci Fi
June 13	Tuesday Night Book Club	CBS
June 17	Spider Riders	Kids' WB
June 18	Treasure Hunters	NBC
June 21	America's Got Talent	NBC
June 22	Master of Champions	ABC
July 7	Psych	USA Network
July 9	Brotherhood	Showtime
July 10	Hotwyred	BET
July 13	The Black Carpet	BET
July 18	Eureka	Sci Fi
July 18	The One: Making a Music Star	ABC
July 19	Work Out	Bravo
July 21	Live at Gotham	Comedy Central
July 28	The Replacements	Disney Channel
July 28	Shorty McShorts' Shorts	Disney Channel
July 31	One Ocean View	ABC
August 5	Di-Gata Defenders	Cartoon Network
August 6	Metalocalypse	Adult Swim
August 13	Your Business	MSNBC
August 21	Vanished	Fox
August 21	Wow! Wow! Wubbzy!	Nick Jr.
August 23	Two-A-Days	MTV
August 26	Viva Piñata	4Kids TV
August 26	Yin Yang Yo!	Jetix
August 26	Biker Mice from Mars	4Kids TV
August 28	Fox Online	Fox News Channel
August 30	Justice	Fox
September 2	ESPN on ABC	ABC
September 4	Curious George	PBS Kids
September 4	CNN Newsroom	CNN
September 5	Desire	MyNetworkTV
September 5	Fashion House	MyNetworkTV
September 5	Standoff	Fox
September 7	Happy Hour	Fox
September 7	'Til Death	Fox
September 9	3-2-1 Penguins!	Qubo
September 9	VeggieTales on TV	Qubo
September 9	Fantastic Four: World's Greatest Heroes	Cartoon Network
September 9	Growing Up Creepie	Discovery Kids
September 10	SeeMore's Playhouse	Syndication
September 10	NBC Sunday Night Football	NBC
September 11	Monday Night Football	ESPN
September 11	Judge Maria Lopez	Syndication
September 12	The Greg Behrendt Show	Syndication
September 12	Men in Trees	ABC
September 14	The Underground	Showtime
September 16	Cake	KOL Secret Slumber Party
September 16	Dance Revolution	KOL Secret Slumber Party
September 16	Horseland	KOL Secret Slumber Party
September 16	Strawberry Shortcake	KOL Secret Slumber Party
September 16	Handy Manny	Playhouse Disney
September 18	The Megan Mullally Show	Syndication
September 18	Rachael Ray	Syndication
September 18	The Class	CBS
September 18	Haversham Hall	Disney Channel
September 18	Pucca	Jetix
September 18	Studio 60 on the Sunset Strip	NBC
September 19	Smith	CBS
September 20	Kidnapped	NBC
September 20	Jericho	CBS
September 21	Six Degrees	ABC
September 21	Shark	CBS
September 23	Legion of Super Heroes	Kids' WB
September 23	Monster Allergy	Kids' WB
September 23	Shaggy & Scooby-Doo Get a Clue!	Kids' WB
September 23	Tom and Jerry Tales	Kids' WB
September 24	Brothers & Sisters	ABC
September 25	Heroes	NBC
September 25	Runaway	The CW
September 25	The Live Desk	Fox News Channel
September 26	Help Me Help You	ABC
September 28	Ugly Betty	ABC
September 29	Grossology	Discovery Kids
September 30	American Idol Rewind	Syndication
October 1	Dexter	Showtime
October 1	The Game	The CW
October 1	House of Carters	E!
October 3	Friday Night Lights	NBC
October 3	Happy Tree Friends	G4
October 4	Beef: The Series	BET
October 4	Freak Show	Comedy Central
October 4	The Nine	ABC
October 4	Most Shocking	Court TV
October 7	Chaotic	4Kids TV
October 11	30 Rock	NBC
October 11	Twenty Good Years	NBC
October 13	1 vs. 100	NBC
October 13	The Upside Down Show	Nickelodeon
October 16	Frisky Dingo	Adult Swim
October 22	Celebrity Paranormal Project	VH1
November 3	Class of 3000	Cartoon Network
November 4	Rob & Big	MTV
November 14	3 lbs	CBS
November 14	Show Me the Money	ABC
November 15	Day Break	ABC
November 26	10 Items or Less	TBS
November 26	Assy McGee	Adult Swim
November 28	Big Day	ABC
December 4	My GamesFever	Fox
December 6	Watch Over Me	MyNetworkTV
December 6	Wicked Wicked Games	MyNetworkTV
December 11	The Lost Room	Sci Fi
December 18	Identity	NBC

=== Shows returning in 2006 ===
Show	Previous network	Last aired	New network	Returning
Time of Your Life	Fox	2000	TBS	March 4
Celebrity Deathmatch	MTV	2002	MTV2	June 10
Jakers! Adventures of Piggley Winks	PBS	2005	Same	September 18

=== Shows changing networks ===
The following shows will air new episodes on a different network than previous first-run episodes.

Show	Moved from	Moved to
7th Heaven	The WB	The CW
Beauty and the Geek	The WB	The CW
Gilmore Girls	The WB	The CW
One Tree Hill	The WB	The CW
Reba	The WB	The CW
Smallville	The WB	The CW
Supernatural	The WB	The CW
All of Us	UPN	The CW
America's Next Top Model	UPN	The CW
Everybody Hates Chris	UPN	The CW
Girlfriends	UPN	The CW
Veronica Mars	UPN	The CW
WWE Friday Night SmackDown	UPN	The CW
The Andy Milonakis Show	MTV	MTV2
Celebrity Deathmatch	MTV	MTV2
Belmont Stakes	NBC	ABC
World's Most Amazing Videos	NBC	Spike
Breeders' Cup	NBC	ESPN
The Contender	NBC	ESPN
Sunday Night Football	ESPN	NBC
Monday Night Football	ABC	ESPN
Invader Zim	Nickelodeon	Nicktoons
The Simple Life	Fox	E!
Time of Your Life	Fox	TBS
Power Rangers	ABC Family	ABC
Space Ghost Coast to Coast	Adult Swim	GameTap

=== Shows ending in 2006 ===
Date	Show	Channel	Debut	Status
January 1	What Should You Do?	Lifetime	2003	Cancelled
January 15	NBA Inside Stuff (returned in 2013)	ABC	1990	Cancelled
January 19	The Crocodile Hunter Diaries	Animal Planet	2002	Cancelled
January 20	The Book of Daniel	NBC	2006	Cancelled
January 21	Law & Order: Trial by Jury	Court TV	2005	Cancelled
January 25	Party/Party	Bravo	2005	Cancelled
January 28	Strange Days at Blake Holsey High	Discovery Kids	2002	Cancelled
February 1	E-Ring	NBC	2005	Cancelled
February 5	Strong Medicine	Lifetime	2000	Cancelled
February 6	Surface	NBC	2005	Cancelled
February 7	Meet the Barkers	MTV	2005	Cancelled
February 7	Crumbs	ABC	2006	Cancelled
February 10	Arrested Development (returned in 2013)	Fox	2003	Cancelled
February 15	Yes, Dear	CBS	2000	Cancelled
February 22	South Beach	UPN	2006	Cancelled
February 22	Clifford's Puppy Days	PBS Kids	2003	Cancelled
February 24	Wildboyz	MTV2	2003	Cancelled
February 27	Monster House	Discovery Channel	2003	Cancelled
February 27	Auto-B-Good	Syndication	2005	Cancelled
March 7	Twins	The WB	2005	Cancelled
March 8	Still Standing	CBS	2002	Cancelled
March 16	Four Kings	NBC	2006	Cancelled
March 18	Darcy's Wild Life	Discovery Kids	2004	Cancelled
March 19	Number 1 Single	E!	2006	Cancelled
March 20	Related	The WB	2005	Cancelled
March 24	Living with Fran	The WB	2005	Cancelled
March 24	The FBI Files	Discovery Channel	1998	Cancelled
March 24	What I Like About You	The WB	2002	Cancelled
March 25	Soul Train	Syndication	1971	Cancelled
March 29	Courting Alex	CBS	2006	Cancelled
March 31	In Justice	ABC	2006	Cancelled
April 9	Free Ride	Fox	2006	Cancelled
April 12	Freddie	ABC	2005	Cancelled
April 14	The Bernie Mac Show	Fox	2001	Cancelled
April 19	Heist	NBC	2006	Cancelled
April 24	Beautiful People	ABC Family	2005	Cancelled
April 24	Get Ed	Jetix	2005	Cancelled
April 24	O'Grady	The N	2004	Cancelled
April 28	Bear in the Big Blue House	Playhouse Disney	1997	Cancelled
April 28	Modern Men	The WB	2006	Cancelled
May 1	Call to Greatness	MTV	2006	Cancelled
May 2	Teachers	NBC	2006	Cancelled
May 2	Thief	FX	2006	Cancelled
May 2	Hope & Faith	ABC	2003	Cancelled
May 9	8th & Ocean	MTV	2006	Cancelled
May 10	The Bedford Diaries	The WB	2006	Cancelled
May 11	Eve	UPN	2003	Cancelled
May 11	Love Inc.	UPN	2005	Cancelled
May 11	Cuts	UPN	2005	Cancelled
May 13	Justice League Unlimited	Kids' WB	2004	Cancelled
May 13	Xiaolin Showdown	Kids' WB	2003	Cancelled
May 14	The Surreal Life (returned in 2022)	VH1	2003	Cancelled
May 14	The West Wing (returned in 2020)	NBC	1999	Cancelled
May 14	Malcolm in the Middle (returned in 2026 as Malcolm in the Middle: Life's Still Unfair)	Fox	2000	Ended
May 14	So NoTORIous	VH1	2006	Cancelled
May 15	Half & Half	UPN	2002	Cancelled
May 15	One on One	UPN	2001	Cancelled
May 16	Love Monkey	VH1	2006	Cancelled
May 18	That '70s Show (returned in 2023 as That '90s Show)	Fox	1998	Ended
May 18	Will & Grace (returned in 2017)	NBC	1998	Ended
May 19	Conviction	NBC	2006	Cancelled
May 19	Wonder Showzen	MTV2	2005	Cancelled
May 21	Charmed	The WB	1998	Ended
May 22	Alias	ABC	2001	Cancelled
May 24	ElimiDate	Syndication	2001	Cancelled
May 24	Starting Over	Syndication	2003	Cancelled
May 26	The Tony Danza Show	Syndication	2004	Cancelled
May 27	The Buzz on Maggie	Disney Channel	2005	Cancelled
May 27	Coconut Fred's Fruit Salad Island	Kids' WB	2005	Cancelled
June 5	Everwood	The WB	2002	Cancelled
June 6	Less than Perfect	ABC	2002	Cancelled
June 6	Rodney	ABC	2004	Cancelled
June 11	WWE Velocity	Webcast on WWE.com	2002	Cancelled
June 12	Monster Garage	Discovery Channel	2002	Cancelled
June 14	Commander in Chief	ABC	2005	Cancelled
June 17	Weekends with Maury and Connie	MSNBC	2006	Cancelled
June 25	Huff	Showtime	2004	Cancelled
June 27	Hi Hi Puffy AmiYumi	Cartoon Network	2004	Cancelled
June 30	Family Business	Showtime	2003	Cancelled
July 1	The Evidence	ABC	2006	Cancelled
July 4	Pepper Dennis	The WB	2006	Cancelled
July 4	Great Hotels	Travel Channel	2001	Cancelled
July 5	Celebrity Poker Showdown	Bravo	2003	Cancelled
July 6	BET Style	BET	2004	Cancelled
July 7	BET.com Countdown	BET	2001	Cancelled
July 11	The Save-Ums!	Discovery Kids	2003	Cancelled
July 14	I Love the '70s: Volume 2	VH1	2006	Cancelled
July 15	Time Warp Trio	Discovery Kids	2005	Cancelled
July 21	What's New, Scooby-Doo?	Cartoon Network	2002	Cancelled
July 23	Chappelle's Show	Comedy Central	2003	Cancelled
July 23	Romeo!	Nickelodeon	2003	Cancelled
July 24	Minoriteam	Adult Swim	2005	Cancelled
July 26	Blue Collar TV	The WB	2004	Cancelled
July 29	Lilo & Stitch: The Series	Disney Channel	2003	Cancelled
July 29	The Adventures of Chico and Guapo	MTV2	2006	Cancelled
July 29	Where My Dogs At?	MTV2	2006	Cancelled
August 5	While You Were Out (returned in 2019)	TLC	2002	Cancelled
August 6	Blue's Clues (returned in 2019)	Nickelodeon	1996	Ended
August 13	Just for Kicks	Nickelodeon	2006	Cancelled
August 19	Phil of the Future	Disney Channel	2004	Cancelled
August 19	Invader Zim	Nickelodeon	2001	Cancelled
August 21	Tabloid Wars	Bravo	2006	Cancelled
August 23	Joey	NBC	2004	Cancelled
August 25	Brandy & Mr. Whiskers	Disney Channel	2004	Cancelled
August 26	Filter	G4/G4techTV	2002	Cancelled
August 27	Lucky Louie	HBO	2006	Cancelled
August 27	Deadwood	HBO	2004	Cancelled
September 1	Blow Out	Bravo	2004	Cancelled
September 1	Date My Mom	MTV	2004	Cancelled
September 2	Saved	TNT	2006	Cancelled
September 8	The Chelsea Handler Show	E!	2006	Cancelled
September 10	Just Legal	The WB	2005	Cancelled
September 13	Blind Date (returned in 2019)	Syndication	1999	Cancelled
September 15	Teen Titans	Kids' WB	2003	Cancelled
September 22	DaySide	Fox News Channel	2003	Cancelled
September 25	Tom Goes to the Mayor	Adult Swim	2004	Cancelled
October 3	Smith	CBS	2006	Cancelled
October 15	Runaway	The CW	2006	Cancelled
October 29	Scariest Places on Earth	Fox Family	2000	Cancelled
November 1	Twenty Good Years	NBC	2006	Cancelled
November 2	Happy Hour	Fox	2006	Cancelled
November 8	Beef: The Series	BET	2006	Cancelled
November 10	Reading Rainbow	PBS	1983	Cancelled
November 13	The Upside Down Show	Noggin	2006	Cancelled
November 14	As Told by Ginger	Nicktoons	2000	Cancelled
November 15	Laguna Beach: The Real Orange County	MTV	2004	Cancelled
November 16	Freak Show	Comedy Central	2006	Cancelled
November 16	The Underground	Showtime	2006	Cancelled
November 18	A.T.O.M.	Jetix	2005	Cancelled
November 19	NASCAR on NBC (NBC only)	NBC	1999	Cancelled
November 19	Battlefield Detectives	History Channel	2003	Cancelled
November 20	House of Carters	E!	2006	Cancelled
November 23	American Eats	History Channel	2006	Cancelled
November 25	The Fairly OddParents (returned in 2008)	Nickelodeon	2001	Cancelled
November 25	The Adventures of Jimmy Neutron, Boy Genius	Nickelodeon	2002	Cancelled
November 25	The X's	Nickelodeon	2005	Cancelled
November 28	3 lbs	CBS	2006	Cancelled
December 2	G.I. Joe: Sigma 6	4Kids TV	2005	Cancelled
December 5	Desire	MyNetworkTV		Cancelled
December 5	Fashion House	MyNetworkTV		Cancelled
December 8	Vanished	MyNetworkTV	Fox	Cancelled
December 9	Cake	CBS		Cancelled
December 9	Fear Factor (returned in 2011, 2017, and 2026)	NBC	2001	Cancelled
December 12	Al TV	VH1	1984	Cancelled
December 12	Help Me Help You	ABC	2006	Cancelled
December 13	The Lost Room	Syfy Channel	2006	Cancelled
December 15	Krypto the Superdog	Cartoon Network	2005	Cancelled
December 16	Super Robot Monkey Team Hyperforce Go!	Jetix	2004	Cancelled
December 17	Breaking Bonaduce	VH1	2005	Cancelled
December 17	Sleeper Cell	Showtime	2005	Cancelled
December 17	Celebrity Paranormal Project	VH1	2006	Cancelled
December 23	W.I.T.C.H.	ABC Kids	2004	Cancelled
December 25	Happy Tree Friends	G4	2006	Cancelled
December 26	Danger Rangers	Syndication	2005	Cancelled

=== Entering syndication in 2006 ===
Show	Seasons	In production	Source
According to Jim	5	Yes	
CSI: Miami	4	Yes	
One on One	5	No	
Scrubs	5	Yes	
The Shield	4	Yes	
Still Standing	4	No	
Without a Trace	4	Yes	

=== Made-for-TV movies ===
Premiere date	Title	Channel
January 6	Drake & Josh Go Hollywood	Nickelodeon
January 20	High School Musical	Disney Channel
January 30	Flight 93	A&E
March 24	Cow Belles	Disney Channel
May 9	Fatal Contact: Bird Flu in America	ABC
June 16	Wendy Wu: Homecoming Warrior	Disney Channel
July 21	Read It and Weep	Disney Channel
August 11	Codename: Kids Next Door: Operation Z.E.R.O.	Cartoon Network
August 25	The Cheetah Girls 2	Disney Channel
September 10–11	The Path to 9/11	ABC
September 16	Mrs. Harris	HBO
October 20	Return to Halloweentown	Disney Channel
October 20	Casper's Scare School	Cartoon Network
November 23	Good Wilt Hunting	Cartoon Network
December 8	Re-Animated	Cartoon Network

== Networks and services ==
=== Launches ===
Network	Type	Launch date	Notes	Source
World Championship Sports Network	Cable and satellite	Unknown		
Music: High Definition	Cable and satellite	January 16		
Documentary Channel	Cable and satellite	January 26		
Mega TV	Cable and satellite	March 1		
16	SportsNet New York	Cable and satellite	March 16	SportsNet New York is a new broadcaster of New York Mets and New York Jets games.
RetroPlex	Cable and satellite	April 3		
BabyFirst	Cable and satellite	May 11		
LAT TV	Cable and satellite	May 19		
MountainWest Sports Network	Cable and satellite	September 1		
MTV Tres	Cable and satellite	September 4		
MyNetworkTV	Over-the-air television network	September 5		
Retirement Living TV	Cable and satellite	September 5		
VeNeMovies	Cable and satellite	September 6		
The CW	Over-the-air television network	September 18		
ReelzChannel	Cable and satellite	September 27		
Gems TV	Cable and satellite	November 29		
France 24	Over-the-air television network	December 6		

=== Conversions and rebrandings ===
Old network name	New network name	Type	Conversion date	Notes	Source
Trio	Sleuth	Cable and satellite	January 1		
PBS YOU	Create	Over-the-air television network	January 9		
BET Jazz	BET J	Cable and satellite	March 1		
Spike TV	Spike	Cable and satellite	May 9		
VH1 Country	CMT Pure Country	Cable and satellite	May 27		
Outdoor Life Network	Versus	Cable and satellite	September 25		

=== Closures ===
Network	Type	Closure date	Notes	Source
UPN	Cable and satellite	September 15		
The WB	Cable and satellite	September 17		
MasMusica TeVe	Cable and satellite	September 25		
MTV en Espanol	Cable and satellite	September 25		

== Television stations ==
=== Station launches ===
Date	City of license/Market	Station	Channel	Affiliation	Notes/Ref.
February	Sherman, Texas (Ada, Oklahoma)	KXII-DT2	12.2	UPN (primary); Sportsman Channel (secondary)	
February 8	Jackson, Mississippi	WRBJ	34	UPN	
March 27	Norfolk, Virginia	WTPC-TV	21	TBN	
April 3	Lafayette, Louisiana	KLWB	50	The WB	
April 10	Amarillo, Texas	K17HI-D	17.1	3ABN	
April 10	Parkersburg, West Virginia (Marietta, Ohio)	WTAP-DT2	15.2	Fox	
April 10	Parkersburg, West Virginia (Marietta, Ohio)	WTAP-DT3	15.3	UPN	
May 20	El Dorado, Arkansas	KETZ	12	PBS	Part of the Arkansas Educational Television Network
June 26	Lincoln, Nebraska	KOWH	51	The WB	
July	Sherman, Texas (Ada, Oklahoma)	KXII-DT3	12.3	Fox	
July 3	Medford, Oregon	KFBI-LD	48	Independent	
August 28	Fort Smith, Arkansas	KFTA-DT2	24.2	NBC	DT2 simulcast of KNWA-TV/Rogers, Arkansas
September 5	Biloxi, Mississippi	WXXV-DT2	25.2	MyNetworkTV	
September 5	Bowling Green, Kentucky	WBKO-DT2	13.2	FOX (primary); Jewelry Television (secondary)	
September 5	Evansville, Indiana	WEVV-DT2	44.2	MyNetworkTV	Full-power simulcast of WTSN-LP
September 5	Florence, South Carolina	WBTW-DT2	13.2	MyNetworkTV (primary); RTN (secondary)	
September 5	Fort Smith, Arkansas	KPBI-CD	46	Independent	MyNetworkTV
September 5	Huntington/Charleston, West Virginia	WSAZ-DT2	3.2	MyNetworkTV	
September 5	Meridian, Mississippi	WTOK-DT2	11.2	Fox	
September 5	Topeka, Kansas	WIBW-DT2	13.2	MyNetworkTV	
September 5	Wilmington, North Carolina	W47CK	47	MyNetworkTV	
September 5	Youngstown, Ohio	WYTV-DT2	33.2	MyNetworkTV	
September 6	Albany, Georgia	WSWG-DT2	44.2	MyNetworkTV	
September 9	Bend, Oregon	KOHD	18.1 (digital); 51.1 (virtual)	ABC	
September 12	Presque Isle, Maine	WAGM-DT2	8.2	CBS	Relocated from WAGM's main channel, which became a Fox affiliate
September 13	Greenville/Greenwood, Mississippi	WABG-DT2	6.2	Fox	
September 13	Lewisburg, West Virginia (Bluefield/Beckley, WV and Bluefield, Virginia)	WVNS-DT2	59.2	Fox	
September 18	Bakersfield, California	KGET-DT2	17.2	The CW Plus	
September 18	Bristol, Virginia (Bristol-Johnson City-Kingsport, Tennessee)	WCYB-DT2	5.2	The CW	
September 18	Charleston, South Carolina	WCBD-DT2	2.2	The CW Plus	
September 18	Charlottesville, Virginia	WVIR-DT2	29.2	The CW Plus	
September 18	Cincinnati, Ohio	WKRC-DT2	12.2	The CW	
September 18	Bowling Green, Kentucky	WBKO-DT3	13.3	The CW Plus	
September 18	Eugene, Oregon	KMTR-DT2	16.2	The CW Plus	
September 18	Fairbanks, Alaska	KATN-DT2		The CW Plus	
September 18	Fort Wayne, Indiana	WPTA-DT2	21.2	The CW Plus	
September 18	Greenville/Washington/New Bern, North Carolina	WNCT-DT2	9.2	The CW Plus	
September 18	Laredo, Texas	KGNS-DT2	8.2	The CW Plus	
September 18	Lima, Ohio	WLIO-DT2	8.2	The CW Plus	
September 18	Palm Springs, California	KCWQ-LD	2.1	The CW Plus	
September 18	Peoria/Bloomington, Illinois	WHOI-DT2	19.2	The CW Plus	
September 18	Rockford, Illinois	WREX-DT2	13.2	The CW Plus	
September 18	Quincy, Illinois (Hannibal, Missouri/Keokuk, Iowa)	WGEM-DT3	10.3	The CW Plus	
September 18	Salisbury, Maryland	WMDT-DT2	47.2	The CW Plus	
September 18	Youngstown, Ohio	WYTV-DT2	33.2	MyNetworkTV	
September 28	San Antonio, Texas	KNIC-TV	17	Telefutura	
October 23	Killeen, Texas	KPLE-LP	30	TBN	
October 26	Harrisonburg, Virginia	WHSV-DT2	3.2	Fox	
Unknown date	Chico, California	KXVU-LP	17	Telemundo	
Unknown date	Destin, Florida	WFBD	48	America One	
Unknown date	Devils Lake, North Dakota	KMDE	25	PBS	Part of the Prairie Public Television network
Unknown date	Grand Junction, Colorado	KKHD-LP	8	Telemundo	
Unknown date	Greenville/New Bern/Washington, North Carolina	WITN-DT2	7.2	Independent (local weather)	
Unknown date	Scottsbluff, Nebraska	KTUW	16	RTV	
Unknown date	Waco, Texas	KWTX-DT2	10.2	UPN	Signed on in early 2006

=== Network affiliation changes ===
Date	City of license/Market	Station	Channel Analog / Digital VC	Old affiliation	New affiliation	Notes/Ref.
July 11	Jackson, Mississippi	WDBD	40	The WB	Fox	
July 11	Jackson, Mississippi	WUFX	35	Fox	The WB	
August 11	Jackson, Tennessee	WJKT	16 / 16.1	UPN	Fox	
August 11	Salisbury, Maryland (Dover/Rehoboth Beach, Delaware)	WBOC-DT2	21.3 (digital RF); 21.2 (virtual)	UPN	Fox	
August 28	Fort Smith, Arkansas	KPBI-CD	46	Fox	Independent	
August 28	Fort Smith, Arkansas	KFTA-TV	24 / 24.1	NBC	Fox	
September 1	Lima, Ohio	WLQP-LP	18	UPN	ABC	
September 5	Gainesville, Florida	WMYG-LP; WGFL-DT2	11; 28.2	CBS (via WGFL)	MyNetworkTV	
September 5	Jackson, Mississippi	WUFX	35	The WB	MyNetworkTV	
September 5	Madison, Wisconsin	WISC-DT2	3.2 (digital)	UPN	MyNetworkTV	
September 5	Meridian, Mississippi	WTOK-DT2	11.2	Fox (primary); Sportsman Channel (secondary)		
September 5	Parkersburg, West Virginia (Marietta, Ohio)	WTAP-DT3	15.3	UPN	MyNetworkTV	
September 5	Peoria/Bloomington, Illinois	WAOE	59	UPN	MyNetworkTV	
September 5	Rockford, Illinois	WTVO-DT2	17.2	UPN	MyNetworkTV	
September 5	Sherman, Texas (Ada, Oklahoma)	KXII-DT3	12.3	UPN (primary); Sportsman Channel (secondary)	MyNetworkTV (primary); RTV (secondary)	
September 12	Presque Isle, Maine	WAGM-TV	8 / 8.1	CBS	Fox	
September 18	Lincoln, Nebraska	KCWL-TV (recalled from KOWH)	51	The CW Plus		
September 18	Syracuse, New York	WSTQ-LP	14	UPN (until September 5); Independent (Sept. 5–17)	The CW	
September 18	Youngstown, Ohio	WFMJ-DT2	21.2	The WB	The CW	
Unknown date	Fort Wayne, Indiana	W07CL	7	The WB	UATV	3ABN
Unknown date	Rehoboth Beach, Delaware (Dover, Delaware/Salisbury, Maryland)	WRDE-LP	59	UATV	America One	

== Births ==
Date	Name	Notability
January 16	Telci Huynh	Actress (Drama Club)
January 21	Lex Lumpkin	Actor (All That)
February 2	Preston Oliver	Actor (Secrets of Sulphur Springs)
March 14	Chinguun Sergelen	Actor (All That)
April 9	Sophie Grace	Actress (The Baby-Sitters Club)
April 10	Dana Heath	Actress (Danger Force)
April 12	Trinitee Stokes	Actress (K.C. Undercover)
April 18	Beatrice Kitsos	Actress (Are Your Afraid of the Dark?)
April 26	Andy Walken	Actor (The Kids Are Alright)
April 30	Xochitl Gomez	Actress (The Baby-Sitters Club)
June 12	Sofia Rosinsky	Actress (Fast Layne)
June 12	Caleb Brown	Actor (That Girl Lay Lay)
June 25	Mckenna Grace	Actress (Crash & Bernstein, The Young and the Restless, Fuller House)
June 29	Sam Lavagnino	Actor (Puppy Dog Pals)
August 7	Luca Luhan	Actor (Danger Force)
August 25	Reece Caddell	Actress (All That)
September 7	Dannielynn Birkhead	Daughter of Anna Nicole Smith
September 7	Ian Chen	Actor (Fresh Off the Boat)
September 28	Momona Tamada	Actress (The Baby-Sitters Club)
October 5	Jacob Tremblay	Canadian actor
October 11	Chance Hurstfield	Actor (Are Your Afraid of the Dark?)
October 15	Marcus Cornwall	Actor (Star Falls)
October 17	Maxwell Simkins	Actor (Bizaardvark, The Mighty Ducks: Game Changers)
October 25	Dallas Young	Actor (Cousins for Life, Cobra Kai)
November 27	Aria Brooks	Actress (All That)
December 5	Ava Kolker	Actress (Sydney to the Max)
December 18	Malia Baker	Actress (The Baby-Sitters Club, Are You Afraid of the Dark?)

== Deaths ==
Date	Name	Age	Notability
January 6	Lou Rawls	72	Actor (Baywatch Nights, Hey Arnold!) and singer
January 12	Anne Meacham	80	Actress (Louise on Another World)
January 14	Shelley Winters	85	Actress (Nana Mary on Roseanne)
February 3	Al Lewis	82	Actor (Grandpa on The Munsters, Leo Schnauser on Car 54, Where Are You?)
February 5	Franklin Cover	77	Actor (Tom Willis on The Jeffersons)
February 5	Norma Candal	78	Actress (Petunia in La criada malcriada)
February 24	Dennis Weaver	81	Actor (Sam McCloud on McCloud, Chester Good on Gunsmoke)
February 24	Don Knotts	81	Actor (Barney Fife on The Andy Griffith Show, Ralph Furley on Three's Company)
February 25	Darren McGavin	83	Actor (Hammer on Mike Hammer)
March 13	Peter Tomarken	63	Game show host (Press Your Luck, Hit Man, Wipeout)
March 17	Bob Papenbrook	50	Voice actor (Power Rangers, Big Bad Beetleborgs, VR Troopers, Masked Rider)
March 25	Buck Owens	76	Musician, host of (Hee Haw)
March 27	Dan Curtis	78	Creator of (Dark Shadows)
April 17	Henderson Forsythe	88	Actor (As the World Turns)
April 30	Jay Bernstein	68	Producer (Mike Hammer); also manager to Suzanne Somers and Farrah Fawcett
May 23	Lloyd Bentsen	85	Politician who appeared in the 1988 vice presidential debate, among other appearances
May 29	James Brolan	42	CBS News sound technician, killed by a car bomb in Iraq
May 29	Paul Douglas	48	CBS news cameraman, killed by a car bomb in Iraq
May 30	Robert Sterling	88	Actor (George Kerby on Topper)
June 6	Billy Preston	59	Musician
June 23	Aaron Spelling	83	Producer (Dynasty, Beverly Hills, 90210, 7th Heaven)
June 28	Lennie Weinrib	71	Actor (H.R. Pufnstuf, The Amazing Chan and the Chan Clan, Inch High, Private Eye)
July 3	Benjamin Hendrickson	55	Actor (As the World Turns)
July 19	Jack Warden	85	Actor (Harry Fox on Crazy Like a Fox, George Halas in Brian's Song)
July 19	Tudi Wiggins	70	Actress (Love of Life)
July 21	Mako	72	Voice actor (Samurai Jack, Avatar: The Last Airbender)
July 21	J. Madison Wright Morris	21	Actress (Earth 2)
August 11	Mike Douglas	86	Talk show host (The Mike Douglas Show)
September 4	Steve Irwin	44	Australian actor (The Crocodile Hunter)
September 10	Daniel Wayne Smith	20	Actor and son of Anna Nicole Smith
September 15	Pablo Santos	19	Mexican actor (David Tiant on Greetings from Tucson)
October 20	Jane Wyatt	96	Actress (Margaret Anderson on Father Knows Best)
November 1	Bettye Ackerman	82	Actress (Dr. Maggie Graham on Ben Casey)
November 9	Ed Bradley	65	CBS News journalist (60 Minutes)
November 11	Belinda Emmett	32	Actress (Rebecca Nash in Home and Away)
December 12	Peter Boyle	71	Actor (Frank Barone on Everybody Loves Raymond)
December 14	Mike Evans	57	Actor (Lionel Jefferson on All in the Family, The Jeffersons)
December 18	Joseph Barbera	95	Animator (The Flintstones and many others)
December 26	Gerald Ford	93	38th President of the United States
December 28	Jared Nathan	21	Child actor (ZOOM)

== See also ==
- 2006 in the United States
- List of American films of 2006
