= World's Worst Mom =

- Genre: Reality
- Starring: Jill Reed
- Country of origin: Canada
- Original language: English
- No. of seasons: 1
- No. of episodes: 13

Production
- Production company: Cineflix Inc.

Original release
- Network: Slice; TLC International
- Release: January 3 – March 28, 2012

World's Worst Mom is a Cineflix produced series that aired on Slice TV and syndicated by TLC International. Based in Toronto, the show features extremely over-protective parents and their families. Lenore Skenazy, columnist and advocate for the Free Range Kids movement, works with parents to help them step outside their boundaries and conquer their fears. In the long run, host Lenore teaches parents how to loosen the reins and give their kids the freedom they need to grow up with independence while still keeping safety as a main priority. World's Worst Mom was originally known by the name Bubble Wrap Kids when it aired locally on Slice in Canada. The series was cancelled after one season.

== Host ==
World's Worst Mom is hosted by columnist and Free Range Kids advocate, Lenore Skenazy. She was nicknamed "World's Worst Mom" by the media for letting her nine-year-old son ride the New York Subway alone. She uses her knowledge as a parent to help parents give their children some independence to allow them to learn and grow as a person.

== Episodes ==
View full episodes at the Slice TV website

- Episode 1 "Ten Year Old or Toddler?"
- Episode 2 "Five Kids on Lockdown"
- Episode 3 "Play Dates Are Banned!"
- Episode 4 "Trapped in Manhattan"
- Episode 5 "Dancing with Danger"
- Episode 6 "Zen & Now"
- Episode 7 "Family Secrets"
- Episode 8 "High Anxiety"
- Episode 9 "The Iron Dome Home"
- Episode 10 "Desperate for Date Night"
- Episode 11 "Welcome to the Nut House"
- Episode 12 "Rules Overboard"
- Episode 13 "Gabriel Drexler's Night In"

== See also ==
- Free-range parenting
