= Kimberly Dozier =

American journalist

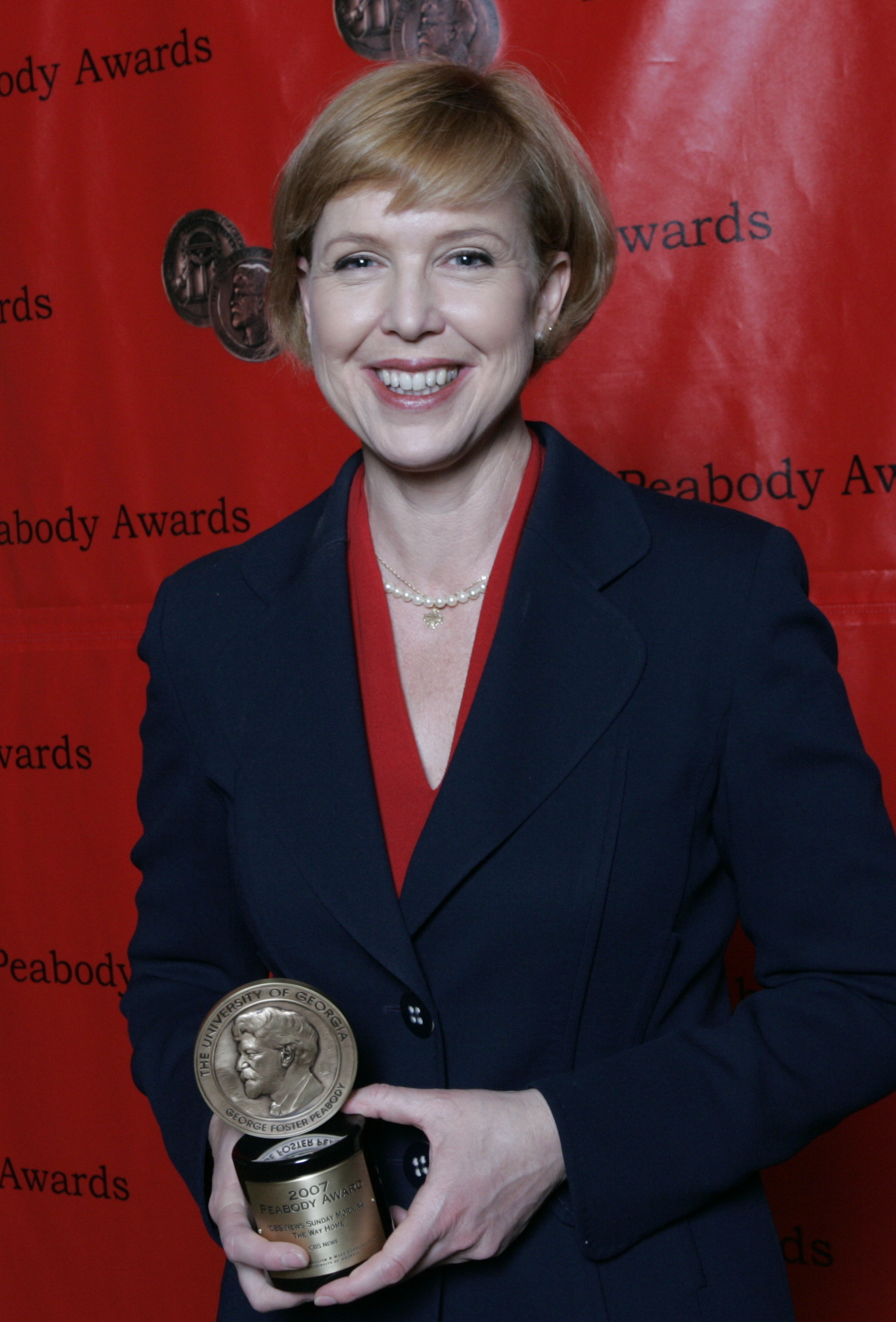
- Dozier in 2008
- Born: July 6, 1966 (age 60); Honolulu, Hawaii, US
- Education: St. Timothy's School, Maryland
- Alma mater: Wellesley College; University of Virginia
- Occupation: Journalist
- Employer(s): CNN (domestic) (2014–present); The Daily Beast (2014–2016); Associated Press (AP) (2010–2014); CBS Evening News (2003—2010); WCBS-TV, New York (2002—2003); CBS Radio News and CBS News (1996—2002); BBC World Service (radio) (1996–1998)
- Awards: Edward R. Murrow Award (Radio Television Digital News Association); Peabody award
- Website: www.kimberlydozier.com

Kimberly Dozier (born July 6, 1966) is an American journalist who is currently a contributor to CNN. She was previously a contributor to Time magazine, contributing writer for The Daily Beast and covered intelligence and counterterrorism for the Associated Press. Prior to that, she was a CBS News correspondent for 17 years, based mostly overseas. She was stationed in Baghdad as the chief reporter in Iraq for CBS News for nearly three years prior to being critically wounded on May 29, 2006. She was the 2014-2015 General Omar N. Bradley Chair in Strategic Leadership, at the Army War College, Penn State Law and Dickinson College.

== Biography ==
Dozier was born in Honolulu, Hawaii, one of six siblings, and raised by Benjamin (died 2016), a construction worker and retired Marine who served in World War II, and Dorothy Dozier (died 2008).

Dozier attended St. Timothy's School, an all-girls boarding school in Stevenson, Maryland. She holds a bachelor's degree from Wellesley College (1987) and a master's degree in foreign affairs from the University of Virginia (1993). From 1988 through 1991, Dozier served as a Washington, D.C.–based reporter for The Energy Daily, New Technology Week, and Environment Week, covering congressional policy and industry regulation. From 1992 through 1995, while living in Cairo, Dozier did freelance work for the CBS Radio Network, Christian Science Monitor Radio, and Voice of America, as well as writing for The Washington Post and the San Francisco Chronicle.

From 1996 through 1998, Dozier was an anchor for BBC World Service's program titled World Update, an hour-long, live foreign affairs broadcast, among other programs. From 1996 through 2002, Dozier served as the London bureau chief and chief European correspondent for CBS Radio News and as a reporter for CBS News television. Her assignments included the war in Iraq, the war in Afghanistan and the hunt for Osama bin Laden, the crisis and refugee exodus in the Balkans, Vladimir Putin's election, the death of Princess Diana, the Northern Ireland peace process, and the Khobar barracks bombing in Dhahran. She has interviewed dozens of newsmakers, including U.S. Gen. Joseph Dunford, Stan McChrystal (ret.) David Petraeus, Secretary of State Condoleezza Rice, Gerry Adams and Yasser Arafat.

Dozier started as a stringer for CBS Radio News, later becoming a network TV correspondent for the CBS Evening News. As part of that progression, from February 2002 through August 2003, Dozier was the chief correspondent for WCBS-TV (New York)'s Middle East bureau in Jerusalem, where she covered the ongoing Israeli–Palestinian conflict and the war in Iraq, before being hired by CBS anchor Dan Rather and reassigned to Baghdad.

After Dozier was injured in Iraq in 2006, CBS gave her temporary assignments covering the Pentagon, the White House and Capitol Hill, for CBS News' Washington, D.C., bureau, from 2007 to 2010, as they were reluctant to let her return to war zones. She left CBS and television reluctantly to become the Intelligence Writer for The Associated Press, to leave the stigma of being combat-injured behind.

In April 2008, Dozier received a Peabody award for "CBS News Sunday Morning: The Way Home", a piece in which she reported the story of two women veterans who lost limbs in Iraq.

Dozier received a 2008 RTNDA/Edward R. Murrow Award for Feature Reporting for the same story. She has also received three American Women in Radio and Television (AWRT) Gracie Awards—in 2000, 2001 and 2002—for her radio reports on Mideast violence, Kosovo and the Afghan war, as well as the organization's Grand Gracie Award in 2007 for her body of television work in Iraq.

Dozier and ABC News anchor Bob Woodruff were honored with the 2007 Radio-Television News Directors Association and Foundation's Leonard Zeidenberg First Amendment Award. She was honored by the Overseas Press Club in 2007 and spoke on behalf of journalists who have been killed and injured in Iraq. In 2008, Dozier became the first woman to receive the Congressional Medal of Honor Foundation's McCrary Award for Excellence in Journalism.

=== Injury in Iraq ===
Kimberly Dozier, former CBS journalist, speaks about her battle with survivor’s guilt during the Tragedy Assistance Program for Survivors (TAPS) Grand Banquet at the 23rd TAPS National Military Survivor Seminar and Good Grief Camp in Arlington, Virginia, May 27, 2017. Dozier was wounded in a 2006 car bombing in Iraq that killed several service members and two CBS co-workers.

Dozier was seriously injured in Iraq on May 29, 2006, in a car bomb attack that killed an American soldier, the 4th ID's Captain James "Alex" Funkhouser, an Iraqi translator, and CBS cameraman Paul Douglas and sound technician James Brolan. She was transferred to Germany for further treatment.

Most of the patrol was outside their parked Humvees in a residential Baghdad neighborhood. Insurgents waited until the patrol approached the car bomb, packed with an estimated five hundred pounds (230 kg) of explosives, before remotely detonating it. The captain, translator and CBS crew were closest to the explosion.

Dozier underwent more than two dozen major surgeries in the two months following the bombing. Doctors removed shrapnel from her head, rebuilt her shattered femurs, and applied skin grafts to extensive burns on both legs. Dozier was first treated at the Baghdad Combat Support Hospital, and the medical facility at Balad, Iraq, before being medevacked to Landstuhl Regional Medical Center, the U.S. military's largest overseas hospital.

Although Dozier was unable to speak because she was on a respirator, she was able to write to communicate; the first question she asked regarded the crew. On June 7, 2006, she returned to the United States for further treatment at the National Naval Medical Center in Bethesda, Maryland.

Coincidentally, in April 2004, Dozier had been featured in a USA Today article on the safety of journalists covering the Iraq War.

Fully recovered from her injuries, Dozier ran the 10K of the 2008 U.S. Marine Corps Marathon to raise money for Fisher House, which provides a place to stay for loved ones of the combat-injured. Proceeds of her 2011 paperback and e-book and funds from speaking to military-related organizations went to a number of charities including NSWKids.org and WoundedWear.org, or to donate thousands of copies of her book to patients and families going through similar medical crises.

Dozier wrote about survivor's guilt and post-traumatic growth in the bomb's aftermath.

Book

Dozier wrote a book, Breathing the Fire: Fighting to Survive, and Get Back to the Fight, which chronicles both her physical and emotional recovery from the IED explosion on Memorial Day 2006 in Iraq. Breathing the Fire was published in May 2008. It was reissued in 2011. In the book, Dozier pieces together her own memories of the explosion and recovery with reports from her doctors, nurses, family members and even rescuers about her condition.

== Bibliography ==
- Breathing the Fire: Fighting to Report--and Survive--the War in Iraq, Meredith Books, 2008, ISBN 9780696238376
- "Can a White House envoy deliver Afghan peace for Trump?". Time Magazine. 195 (7–8) (International ed.): 10. March 2–9, 2020.
