= Lenore Skenazy =

American journalist (born 1959)

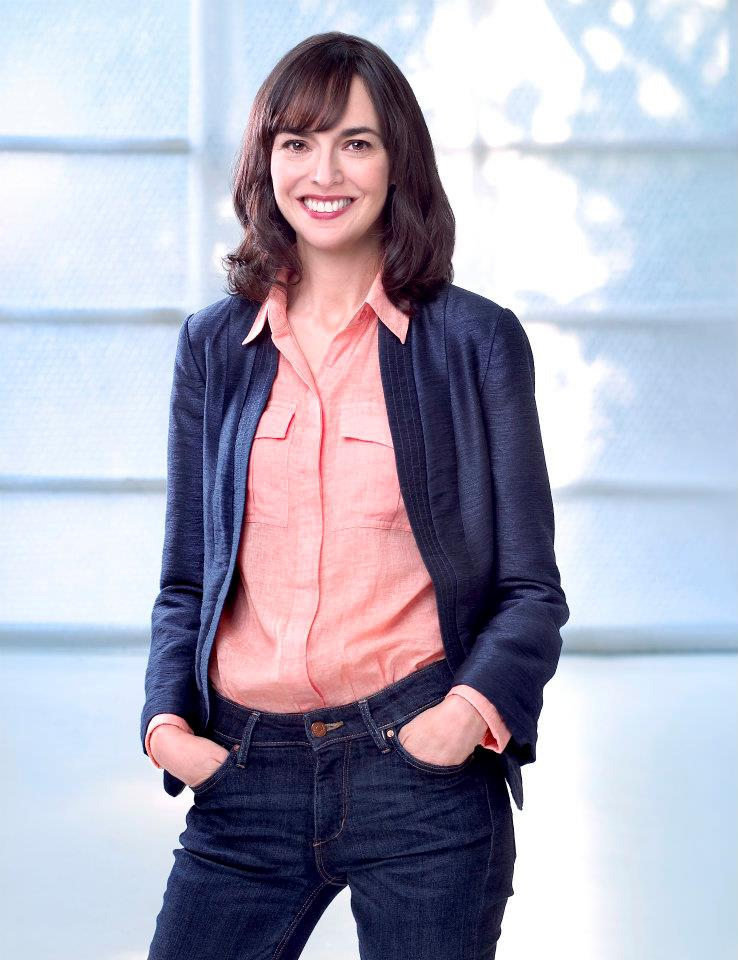
- Born: November 27, 1959 (age 66); Chicago, Illinois, U.S.
- Education: Yale University (BA); Columbia University (MA)
- Occupations: Writer and reality show host
- Organization: Let Grow
- Known for: Free-range parenting
- Notable work: Books: "Free-Range Kids: Giving Our Children the Freedom We Had Without Going Nuts with Worry" (2009) "Free-Range Kids: How Parents and Teachers Can Let Go and Let Grow" (2021)
- Television: World's Worst Mom
- Website: https://letgrow.org/

Lenore Skenazy (/lɪˈnɔːr skəˈneɪzi/; born November 27, 1959) is an American speaker, blogger, syndicated columnist, author, and reality show host, known for her activism in favor of free-range parenting. In 2008, she wrote a controversial column on her decision to let her son, then nine years old, take the New York City Subway home alone, which was completed without incident. The piece became a national story, prompting massive media attention. She was dubbed "America's Worst Mom". In response, Skenazy wrote Free-Range Kids, adding a blog of the same name.

Skenazy is the president of Let Grow, co-founded in 2018 with Daniel Shuchman, Peter Gray and Jonathan Haidt. The organization's mission is to make it "easy, normal, and legal to give kids the independence they need to grow into capable, confident and happy adults." In 2018, her activism led to Utah being the first state to pass a "Free-Range Parenting" bill.

== Early life and education ==
Skenazy was born to a Jewish family, in Chicago, on November 27, 1959. Her paternal grandparents emigrated from Çanakkale, Turkey. Her maternal grandparents came from Russia and Poland.

Skenazy is a 1981 graduate of Yale University. She earned a master's degree from Columbia University in 1983.

== Career ==
Skenazy spent four years as freelancer for New York Daily News followed by 13 1/2 years as a columnist for the newspaper. Her columns there were syndicated in about 20 other newspapers. She wrote about "intriguing oddballs", such as a couple who got married underwater. She was featured in the 2006 Bravo series Tabloid Wars, which focused on Daily News journalists. Skenazy was fired Daily News in late 2006. She subsequently moved to The New York Sun, and wrote there until the newspaper closed in 2008.

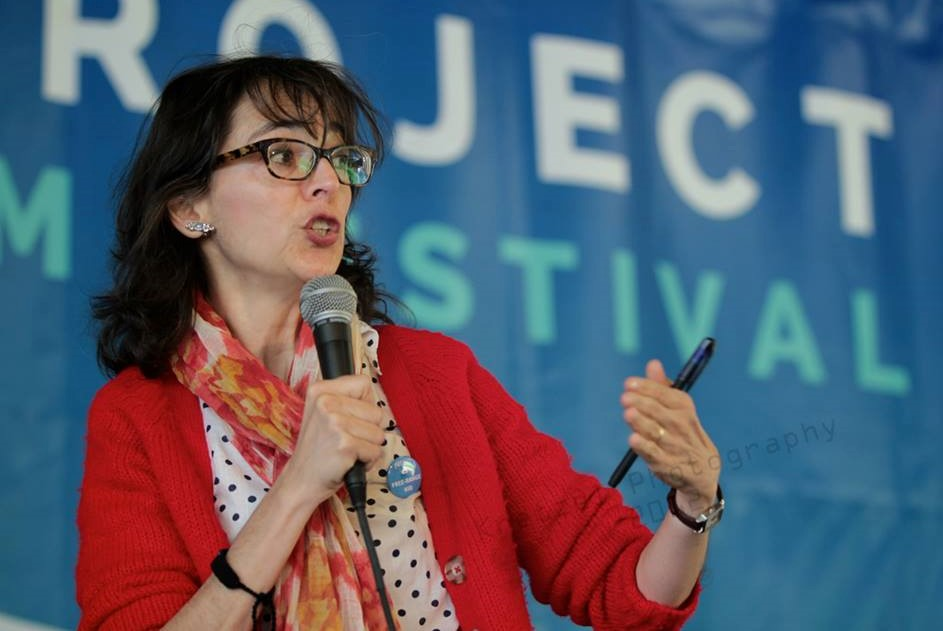
Lenore Skenazy speaking at PorcFest, New Hampshire Porcupine Freedom Festival

Skenazy's 2008 column in the Sun, "Why I Let My 9-Year-Old Ride the Subway Alone," described her controversial decision to let her son take the New York City Subway home alone, which was completed without incident. The piece resulted in accusations of child abuse and memories of first-time subway trips and childhood freedom. The story was covered on The Today Show, Fox News, NPR, and MSNBC, becoming worldwide news and being featured on Penn & Teller: Bullshit!, The View, Nightline, Good Morning America, CBS News, NBC Nightly News, Anderson Cooper, Dr. Phil, Nancy Grace, the BBC, the Canadian Broadcasting Corporation (CBC), and ABC TV in Australia.

Skenazy is a frequent contributing writer for Reason magazine, covering mostly topics related to her concept of free-range parenting as well as overprotective parents and laws that punish parents when they leave their children unsupervised.

=== Free-range parenting ===
Skenazy started blogging on the subject, and her blog's popularity led to the 2009 book Free-Range Kids. She proposed May 22, 2010, as the first "Take Our Children to the Park & Leave Them There Day"—a day for children to learn how to play by themselves without constant supervision.

In 2012 Skenazy hosted the reality television show World's Worst Mom on Discovery Life. The 13-episode series features Skenazy visiting anxious parents, including the mother of a 10-year-old whom she still spoon-fed; the mother who only let her eight-year-old ride a skateboard on the grass; and the mother of a 13-year-old who still took him into the ladies' room.

In 2015, Skenazy was profiled in both The New Yorker and The New York Times.

In 2018, Utah became the first state in the U.S. to pass the Free-Range Parenting bill, assuring parents that they can give their children some independence without this being mistaken for neglect, for which the Washington Post credited Skenazy's 2008 column as a contributing influence. Similar laws recognizing reasonable childhood independence have since been enacted in other states, including Colorado, Oklahoma, and Texas. Several other states have relaxed laws regarding some aspects of childhood independence.

=== Let Grow ===
In 2017, Skenazy co-founded the nonprofit organization Let Grow, along with psychologists Jonathan Haidt and Peter Gray, and businessman Daniel Shuchman. Let Grow's mission is to make it "easy, normal, and legal to give kids the independence they need to grow into capable, confident and happy adults." Its free materials for parents, schools, and counselors help them encourage independence and unstructured, unsupervised free play and real-world responsibility for adolescents and children. On its website, Let Grow offers several programs, including one that challenges children to try an activity for the first time, such as dog walking, meal preparation, or running an errand. Another initiative, called Let Grow Play Club, requests that schools remain open before and after their scheduled hours for mixed-age, unstructured play.

== Bibliography ==
- Free-Range Kids: Giving Our Children the Freedom We Had Without Going Nuts with Worry. John Wiley & Sons. 2009. ISBN 978-0470471944. OCLC 268790698.
- Who's the Blonde that Married What's-His-Name: The Ultimate Tip of the Tongue Test of Everything You Know You Know…But Can’t Remember Right Now (Penguin Books, June 2009)
- "The Dysfunctional Family Christmas Songbook" (Broadway Books, 2004), with co-author John Boswell.
- "When Good Parents Get Arrested". Reader's Digest. May 2016.
- "Why parents are more paranoid than ever", New York Post, March 31, 2018
