= Latchkey kid =

Child often left at home with no supervision

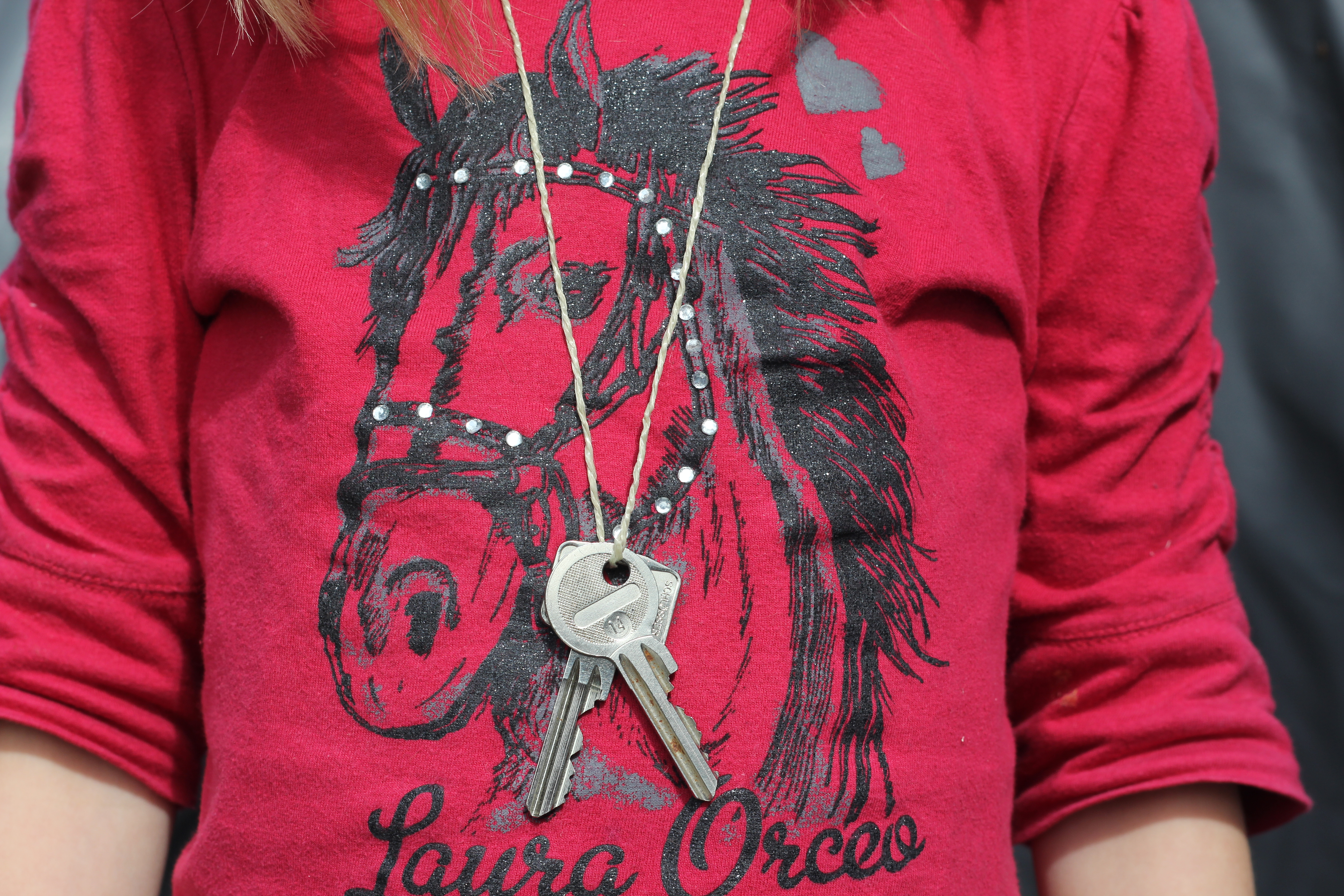
A child with keys to their home hanging from their neck

A latchkey kid, or latchkey child, is a child who returns to an empty home after school (or other activities) or a child who is often left at home with no supervision. Such a child can be any age, alone or with siblings who are also under the age of maturity for their community.

== History of the term ==
The term refers to the latchkey of a door to a house or apartment. The key is often strung around the child's neck or left hidden under a mat (or some other object) at the rear door to the property. The term seems to first appear in a CBC Radio program called "Discussion Club – Topic: How War Affects Canadian Children" in 1942, due to the phenomenon of children being left home alone during World War II, when the father would be enlisted into the armed forces and the mother would need to get a job. Given that the "Discussion Club" participants are all familiar with the term and allude to it being in colloquial usage, it likely predates 1942. In general, the term "latchkey" designates "those children between the ages of five and thirteen who care for themselves after the school day until their parents or guardians return home".

More specifically for their purposes, the San Marino (CA) Public Library has defined a Library Latchkey Child as "one, who, on a regular basis, is required by their parents or guardian to remain at the public library for extended periods of time after school in lieu of day care. 'Regular basis' is defined as three or more days in a week. 'Extended period' is defined as two or more hours in a day" (American Library Association 12).

The term latchkey kid became commonplace in the 1970s and 1980s to describe members of Generation X who, according to a 2004 marketing study, "went through its all-important, formative years as one of the least-parented, least-nurtured generations in U.S. history." Latchkey kids were prevalent during this time, a result of increased divorce rates and increased maternal participation in the workforce at a time before childcare options outside the home were widely available. These latchkey children, referred to as "day orphans" in the 1984 documentary, To Save Our Children to Save Our Schools, mainly came from middle or upper-class homes. The higher the educational attainment of the parents, the higher the likelihood the children of this time would be latchkey kids.

== Effects on children ==
The effects of being a latchkey child differ with age. Loneliness, boredom and fear are most common for those younger than ten years of age. In the early teens, there is a greater susceptibility to peer pressure, potentially resulting in such behavior as alcohol abuse, drug abuse, sexual promiscuity and smoking. The behaviors might stem from "unspent energy, peer pressure to misbehave, or hostility because of the lack of appropriate adult attention". In one study, middle school students left home alone for more than three hours a day reported higher levels of behavioral problems, higher rates of depression, and lower levels of self-esteem than other students.

If, however, there are enough stimuli at home, such as books, computers, games, solitary hobbies such as modelmaking, etc., the negative effects can be averted. The child may learn independent lifestyle skills, such as making meals, very early.

Positive effects of being a latchkey child include independence and self-reliance at a young age. Deborah Belle, author of The After-School Lives of Children: Alone and with Others While Parents Work, suggests that being left home alone may be a better alternative to staying with baby-sitters or older siblings.

== Legal issues ==
The legality of the latchkey children's unsupervised time varies with country, state and local area laws. In the United States, state and local laws typically do not specify any particular age under 18 when a child can be legally left without supervision. Some states do have specific age restrictions, but most of the US states have no minimum age for leaving children unsupervised.

Parents can be held accountable by child welfare, child protective services organizations, or law enforcement if children come to harm while left without supervision if, in the opinion of the agency, the children's age or other considerations made such a choice inappropriate.

== See also ==
- Children's street culture
- Do you know where your children are?
- Free-range parenting
- Home Alone (1990)
- Home zone / Play street
- Meitiv incidents
