= Kerry Burke (reporter) =

American journalist

Kerry Burke is a city reporter for the New York Daily News. He was one of the stars of the 2006 Bravo reality series "Tabloid Wars."

== Portrayal ==
Burke was portrayed on Tabloid Wars as a resourceful, aggressive reporter who would write about anything and do anything to get the story. "You see Kerry Burke, who'll go all night long until he drops because he wants to get the story, whether it's celebrity fluff or a triple homicide," Bravo executive producer Ted Skillman told The Washington Post's Howard Kurtz. "Tabloid Wars" shows Burke writing about stories as varied as a Harry Potter book release party and a beating attack in Queens that may have been racially motivated. "I cover murder and mayhem," he said in an interview with the Bowdoin College Orient newspaper.

"There are times I've gone to doors and started kicking them, and either that door is gonna give or the person on the other side is gonna answer, because I need that quote," Burke told Kurtz.

== Early life ==
Burke grew up in Boston. He attended Bowdoin College - where he competed in the Mr. Bowdoin college pageant - and graduated in 1984.

== Career ==
Burke started his career as a freelancer at CitySearch, writing reviews of New York bars and concerts. After graduating from the Columbia School of Journalism in 2002, he got a job at the Daily News as a "runner" - a reporter out on the streets who hustles to get information however he can.

== Personal ==
When he's reporting, Burke carries a backpack containing the following: A flashlight, a bottle of water, tons of notebooks, a box of pens, a disposable camera, batteries, an umbrella, a tape recorder, many maps (borough, subway and bus), a cell phone charger, business cards, magazines, "stake-out food" and Hagstrom's NYC Five Borough map book.
