= James Brolan =

British television sound technician (1964–2006)

James Brolan (7 April 1964 – 29 May 2006) was a British freelance journalist and television sound technician, who was killed while working for CBS News in Baghdad, Iraq. Just one month before he was killed in Iraq, Brolan, as part the CBS News team that covered the 2005 Kashmir earthquake, received the 2005 Overseas Press Club Award—the David Kaplan Award for Best Television Spot News Reporting From Abroad.

== Personal ==
James Brolan grew up in Holloway, London and attended St Joseph's RC Primary School in Holborn and later St. Aloysius College in Highgate. Brolan had military experience as he had served with the British Army, including tours of duty in Northern Ireland, between 1983 and 1988. He resided in Tufnell Park near Dartmouth Park.

Based in London, he was survived by his wife of 20 years, Geri Brolan, and their two children, Sam and Agatha.

== Career ==
As a sound technician for CBS News, James Brolan worked in Pakistan, Afghanistan and Iraq. He also had worked in the Himalayas in Nepal while with ABC News. During the invasion of Iraq in 2003, Brolan worked with Bob Woodruff of ABC News. Later, Woodruff and his cameraman would be injured in a bombing on 29 January 2006, four months before Brolan was killed. With both ABC and CBS in Iraq, Brolan was part of the "embedded journalist" system that was created by the military for the 2003 Iraq War whereby journalists were assigned units and became dependent upon those units and their standing in the chain of command for information and access to the coverage of the war zone.

== 2005 Pakistan earthquake ==
James Brolan was part of the award-winning CBS team that covered the 2005 earthquake in Pakistan. The team included producer Andy Clarke, reporter Richard Roth, camera operator Nick Turner, and Brolan as sound technician.

== Death ==
James Brolan continued to work with CBS producer Andy Clarke in Iraq. Camera operator Paul Douglas, Brolan, and an Iraqi translator named "Sam", were with Captain James "Alex" Funkhouser of the 4th Brigade Combat Team of the 4th Infantry Division, with whom they were embedded, when a car bomb was detonated by a remote phone call. The explosion of the 500-pound bomb killed them on 29 May 2006 and wounded CBS correspondent Kimberly Dozier, as well as six soldiers. Dozier has said that Brolan was killed immediately.

The CBS news team was supposed to be covering a "Memorial Day" story about how troops were spending their holiday, but the embed host made a stop at checkpoint in the Karrada district of Baghdad. It was in Karrada that they were attacked. The US military later issued a report that blamed the attack on insecure communications and lack of additional security planning for the news team.

== Context ==
According to Reporters Without Borders, more journalists have been killed in the Iraq War than in any other war since World War II.

== In popular culture ==
The Rory Peck Foundation raised £8,000 in a 2011 cricket game challenging CBS in honor of fallen journalists Paul Douglas and James Brolan.

Dozier's book Breathing the Fire, published in 2008, covers the event and her work with Brolan and Douglas.

The families of Douglas and Brolan attended the opening for a journalists memorial in Bayeux, France, on the day before 2007 World Press Freedom Day, which is held 3 May every year. The names of both men are listed on the memorial. The memorial was established in the location of the first liberated French city during World War II. Reporters Without Borders estimated that 1,889 journalists had been killed from 1944 to 2007.
