= Judi's House =

Children's grief center in Denver, Colorado

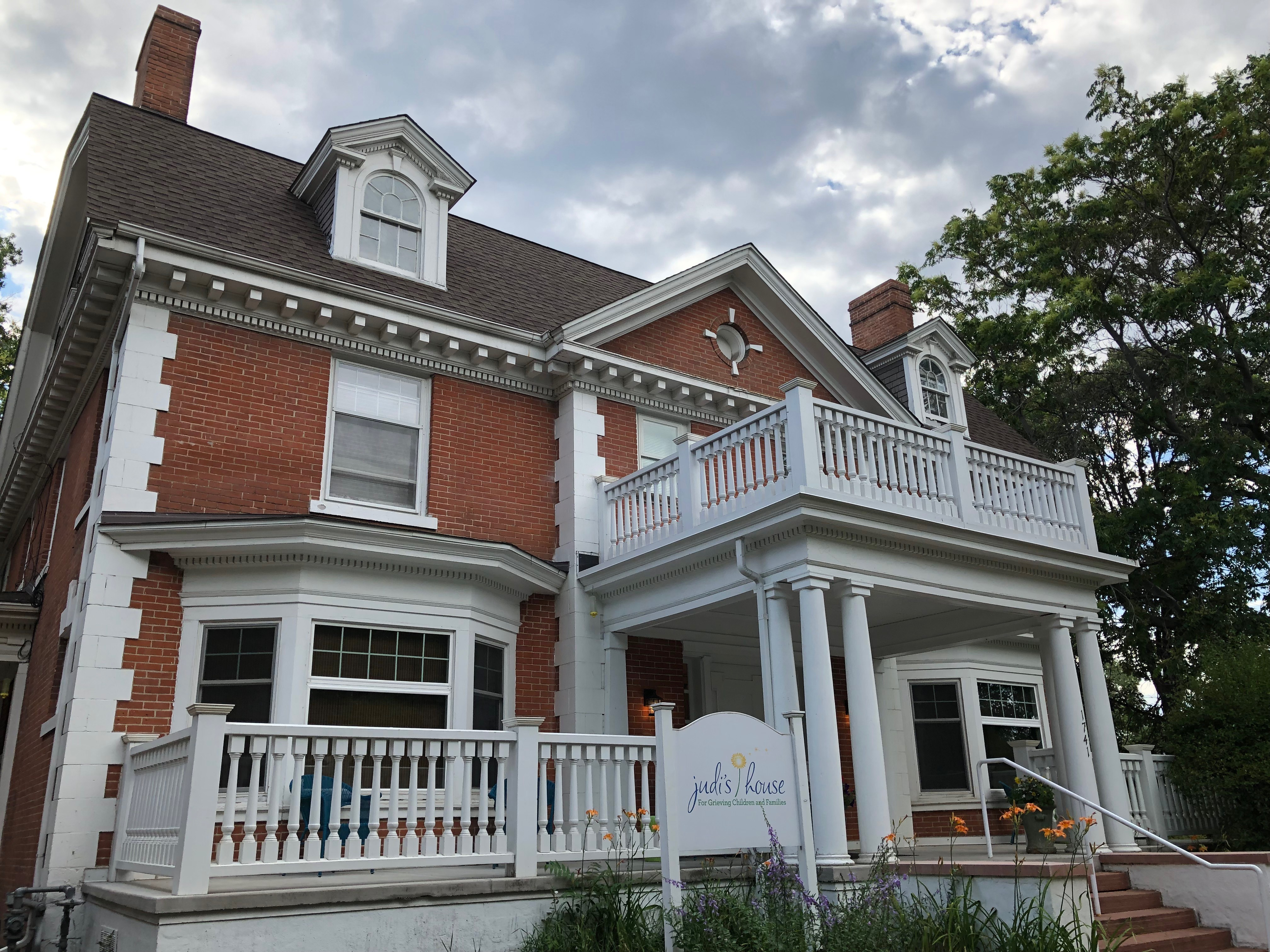
- Judi's House front entrance
- Formation: 2002
- Founder: Brian Griese
- Type: Nonprofit organization
- Purpose: Childhood grief support services
- Location: Denver, Colorado, United States
- Coordinates: 39.74420°N 104.96132°W
- Website: judishouse.org

Judi's House was founded by Brian Griese in honor and in memory of his mother, Judi Griese, who died from breast cancer when Brian was twelve years old. Judi Griese was the wife of former Miami Dolphins star, Bob Griese.

Judi Griese died in 1988 after a six-year battle with breast cancer. In his book, Undefeated (ISBN 0-7852-7021-3), co-written with his father, Brian recalled that he felt he had nowhere to turn to with his grief. He reported that he did not want to burden his father, as he was dealing with his own grief at the time. (Bob Griese had also lost his father when he was ten years old).

While playing for the Denver Broncos, Brian Griese established a house where children could meet with support groups and counselors. Griese named it Judi's House, and placed a picture of Judi over the fireplace. The house features rooms where children could create art or become physically active as they dealt with their grief. Judi's House is located in Denver, Colorado.

== Grief Services ==
Judi’s House provides services to children and youth, ages 3 to 25, in Colorado. Services are provided to families at no charge and are available in English and Spanish. Services include assessment, group counseling (the Pathfinders and Connections programs), individual/family/couples counseling, play therapy, and educational workshops. More than 13,000 individuals have received services from Judi’s House since 2002.

== Childhood Bereavement Estimation Model (CBEM) ==
Judi’s House and the JAG Institute, in partnership with the New York Life Foundation, developed CBEM. The model uses mortality data to produce estimates of childhood bereavement at the national, state and county level.

The “current model type" produces estimates of the number and percentage of children, at a point in time, who have lost a parent or sibling to death. In 2025, there are an estimated 2.6 million children under age 18 who have lost a parent to death and 3.3 million who have lost a parent or sibling to death. In 2025, for the population under 25, there are an estimated 5.9 million children and youth who have lost a parent to death and 7.1 million who have lost a parent or sibling to death.

The “projected model type" produces estimates of the percentage of children who will lose a parent or sibling by some specified age (by age 18 or by age 25). The model projects that 8.9 percent of children (1 in 11) will lose a parent or sibling to death by age 18. By age 25, 15 percent (1 in 7) of children or youth will lose a parent or sibling to death.

In addition to national estimates, the model produces estimates by state and county. In 2025, New Mexico had the highest estimated childhood bereavement rate (14.2 percent of children) and Utah had the lowest rate (6.8 percent of children). Within New Mexico, the county with the highest bereavement rate is McKinley County.

=== Topic Reports ===
Judi’s House / JAG Institute also use CBEM to develop topic reports. In 2025, the topic reports focused on bereaved children and their eligibility for Social Security benefits. In prior years, topic reports have focused on how bereavement rates are associated with household income levels and race / ethnicity. The topic reports are used by Judi’s House and others to support specific calls to action.

==== Social Security Benefits for Bereaved Children ====
The 2025 topic reports focused on Social Security. Bereaved children are potentially eligible for Social Security benefits but often do not receive them due to a lack of awareness of eligibility or difficulty navigating the federal bureaucracy. An estimated 45 percent of bereaved children are eligible for but not receiving Social Security benefits. Nationally, these missed benefits are estimated to total $15.5 billion per year. State and county estimates for missed benefits are also produced using CBEM. For example, in New York state, the lost benefits total $741 million. For Kings County (Brooklyn), New York, the lost benefits total $90 million.

The topic reports were the basis for a call to action to improve access to Social Security for bereaved children, including greater outreach to bereaved families and the implementation of the recommendations of the Social Security Advisory Board on improving access to Social Security’s survivor benefits.

==== Household Income ====
The 2024 topic reports focused on household income and childhood bereavement. Analysis of the CBEM estimates indicated that “In the vast majority of U.S. states, children in the lowest income counties had the highest bereavement rates, and the magnitude of the difference was typically substantial.”

== National Partners ==
Judi’s House is a founding member of the National Alliance for Children’s Grief (NACG). NACG is a national network whose members seek “to facilitate the mental, emotional and physical health of grieving children and their families.”

Judi’s House also partners with OptionB, a nonprofit started by Sheryl Sandberg following the death of her husband.

Other national partners include: Coalition to Support Grieving Students, Eluna, Dougy Center, National Child Traumatic Stress Network, and the New York Life Foundation.
