= Doug Vogt =

Canadian photojournalist and cameraman (born 1959)

Doug Vogt (/voʊt/; born 1959) is a Canadian photojournalist and cameraman. He was born in Medicine Hat, Alberta, Canada. He lived 25 years in Europe and presently lives in Los Angeles, United States.

== Education ==
Doug Vogt studied Broadcast Journalism at Mount Royal College in Calgary Alberta Canada. He graduated from the college in 1980. Mount Royal College is now known as Mount Royal University.

== Career ==
While on assignment in Iraq for ABC News with anchor Bob Woodruff, Vogt and Woodruff were severely injured by a roadside bomb. Vogt was struck by shrapnel in the head and suffered other body injuries. He and Woodruff were wearing body armor and protective helmets at the time.

Woodruff and Vogt received battlefield surgical treatment at the U.S. Air Force hospital south of Balad, Iraq and were evacuated to the United States Army Medical Command hospital at Landstuhl, Germany on Sunday, January 29. After arriving in the USA they were treated at the Intensive Care Unit at the NNMC in Bethesda, Maryland.

Vogt extensively covered war zones from 1986 until his injury in 2006. In 1992, covering the start of the war in Bosnia-Herzegovina, Doug Vogt was teamed up with ABC journalists Sam Donaldson, David Kaplan, Ben Sherwood and soundman Dave Calvert. After leaving the Sarajevo Airport in different vehicles producer David Kaplan was shot and killed by a sniper on the road nicknamed 'Sniper's Alley'.

Vogt has won six Emmy Awards and two DuPont Columbia Awards for his work. He was also awarded the USO Heart Of A Patriot award in 2007. Vogt has extensive experience with conflict journalism in Afghanistan, Iraq, Croatia, Palestine, Liberia, the Congo, Bosnia and Somalia. Vogt has worked extensively with Peter Jennings, Diane Sawyer, Barbara Walters and Ted Koppel.

== Personal life ==
Vogt is married to Vivianne Maia E. "Vivian" Souza. They have three daughters, Naima, Savannah and Kira. They live in Aix-en-Provence, France.
