= Brian Griese =

American football player and coach (born 1975)

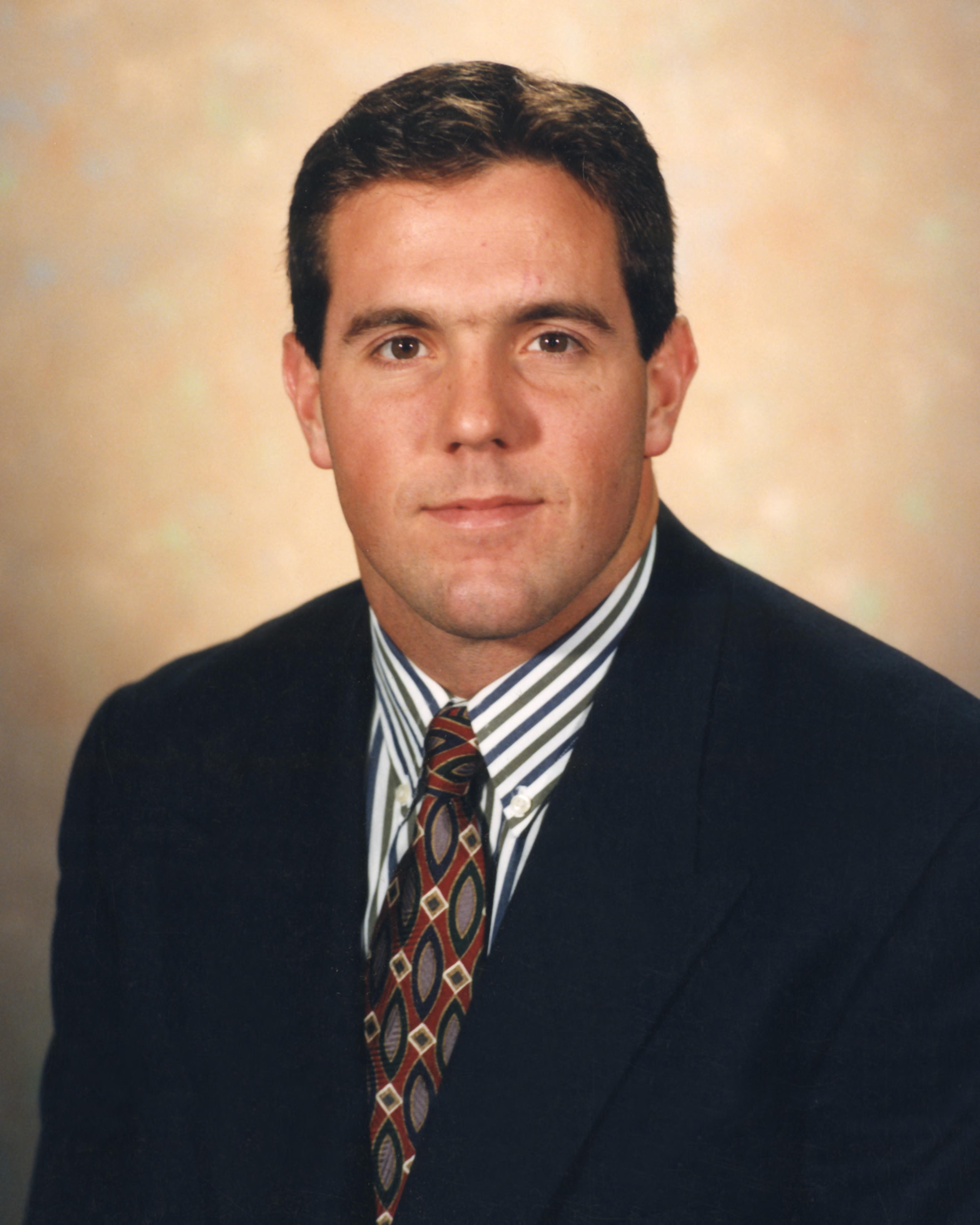
- Griese in 1997

Personal information
- Born: March 18, 1975 (age 51); Miami, Florida, U.S.
- Listed height: 6 ft 3 in (1.91 m)
- Listed weight: 214 lb (97 kg)

Career information
- High school: Christopher Columbus (Miami)
- College: Michigan (1993–1997)
- NFL draft: 1998: 3rd round, 91st overall pick

Career history

Playing
- Denver Broncos (1998–2002); Miami Dolphins (2003); Tampa Bay Buccaneers (2004–2005); Chicago Bears (2006–2007); Tampa Bay Buccaneers (2008)

Coaching
- San Francisco 49ers (2022–2024) Quarterbacks coach

Awards and highlights
- As player: Super Bowl champion (XXXIII); Pro Bowl (2000); NFL passer rating leader (2000); NFL completion percentage leader (2004); AP poll national champion (1997); First-team All-Big Ten (1997); Rose Bowl MVP (1998); Rose Bowl Hall of Fame (2012)

Career NFL statistics
- Passing attempts: 2,796
- Passing completions: 1,752
- Completion percentage: 62.7%
- TD–INT: 119–99
- Passing yards: 19,440
- Passer rating: 82.7
- Stats at Pro Football Reference

Brian David Griese (/ˈɡriːsi/ GREE-see; born March 18, 1975) is an American professional football coach and former player who was most recently the quarterbacks coach for the San Francisco 49ers of the National Football League (NFL). A former quarterback in the NFL, he played college football for the Michigan Wolverines and was selected by the Denver Broncos in the third round of the 1998 NFL draft.

Griese played three seasons at the University of Michigan, leading the Wolverines to win the 1997 national championship. After being selected in the third round by the Denver Broncos in the 1998 NFL draft, he earned a Super Bowl ring with the Broncos in his rookie season, as a backup to John Elway in Super Bowl XXXIII. Elway retired after the Super Bowl and Griese became the starting quarterback for the Broncos during the 1999 season. Griese was a Pro Bowl selection with the Broncos in 2000. After leaving the Broncos he started at quarterback for the Miami Dolphins (5 games in 2003), Chicago Bears (13 games in 2006 and 2007) and Tampa Bay Buccaneers (21 games in 2004, 2005, 2008). He is the son of Hall of Fame quarterback Bob Griese. Griese is a former color commentator for Monday Night Football on ESPN.

== Early life ==
Griese was born in Miami, Florida and attended Christopher Columbus High School in Miami, playing football, basketball and golf. Brian is the son of former NFL Quarterback Bob Griese, who spent his entire career with the Miami Dolphins.

== College career ==
Griese played college football at the University of Michigan from 1993 to 1997. Michigan did not offer him a scholarship, so he walked on to the football team. He turned down scholarship offers from Purdue (his father's alma mater) and Kentucky. After he was redshirted in 1993 and limited to placeholding duties in 1994, Griese took over as the starting quarterback after Scott Dreisbach was injured five games into the 1995 season. Griese started for the remainder of the 1995 season, capped by an upset of #2 ranked Ohio State, 31–23.

At the beginning of the 1996 season, Dreisbach regained his starting job and Griese returned to the bench, serving as the team's pooch punter. However, after Dreisbach struggled, Griese replaced him at halftime against Ohio State, where he led the Wolverines to another upset victory over the Buckeyes, 13–9. Griese finished the season starting in a 17–14 loss to Alabama in the Outback Bowl.

In 1997, Griese remained the starter. Along with Heisman Trophy winner Charles Woodson, he led the Wolverines to an undefeated season and a share of the national championship. Griese was selected as the MVP of the 1998 Rose Bowl, passing for 251 yards and three touchdowns in Michigan's win over Washington State.

In his Michigan career, Griese had a 17–5 record as a starter. The Wolverines won all three games against Ohio State in which he quarterbacked. He was inducted into the Rose Bowl Hall of Fame on December 30, 2012.

== Professional career ==
=== Denver Broncos ===
The Denver Broncos selected Griese 91st overall in the third round of the 1998 NFL draft. He began his career as a third-string back up to Bubby Brister and John Elway. He became a Super Bowl champion in 1998, though he spent most of the season on the sidelines. Following Elway's retirement in 1999, Griese became the Broncos' starting quarterback. Griese earned a 75.6 passer rating during his first season as starter, but improved the next year, raising it to 102.9. His efforts merited him an invite to the 2001 Pro Bowl.

Griese consistently completed a high percentage of his passes. He has had four seasons with a better than 64% completion rate, including one year (2004) when he completed 69.3% of his passes. Nevertheless, he was unable to establish himself as one of the elite quarterbacks of the league, due to injuries and a penchant for interceptions. He was released by the Broncos, following the 2002 season, and was replaced by former Cardinals starter Jake Plummer.

=== Miami Dolphins ===
In June 2003 he signed with the Miami Dolphins. His stint with the Dolphins, where his father Bob Griese played his entire 14-year career, was brief, being released in February 2004. Griese was given the starting job when the Dolphins starting quarterback Jay Fiedler got injured. Griese had an excellent start as a Dolphin, passing for 3 touchdowns and 0 interceptions in a blowout victory against San Diego.

=== Tampa Bay Buccaneers (first stint) ===
Griese signed with and performed well for the Tampa Bay Buccaneers, and provided a catalyst for the jumpstart of the Tampa offense. He was named the starter for the team in October 2004, benching Super Bowl champion Brad Johnson. He won his first game starting, against the New Orleans Saints in week five.

On October 16, 2005 during a week six matchup against the Miami Dolphins, Griese suffered a season ending knee injury. Griese helped them to their only victories in 2004 with a 97.5 QB rating and to a 5–1 record in 2005 before succumbing to a torn ACL. Griese was cut by the Buccaneers in 2006 after the injury to his knee in order to free up money for the salary cap.

=== Chicago Bears ===
On March 21, 2006, he signed a five-year contract with the Chicago Bears.

After signing with the Bears, Griese saw limited action. Though he fared better than Rex Grossman during the 2006 preseason, coach Lovie Smith decided to keep Griese as the Bears' second-string quarterback. He took late fourth quarter snaps at the end of major victories. Though Grossman started every Bears game in the 2006 season, Smith allowed Griese some extended gametime during week fifteen, after the Bears had clinched home-field advantage throughout the playoffs. In a game against the Detroit Lions, Griese completed six of nine passes for 51 yards, which set up several game-winning Robbie Gould field goals. Smith called on Griese to relieve a struggling Grossman for the second half of the final regular season game against the Green Bay Packers. However, Griese did not fare a lot better, completing 5 of 15 passes for 124 yards, one touchdown and two interceptions. While some Chicagoans questioned Grossman's ability to lead the Bears to the Super Bowl, Smith stood by Grossman, and declared him the team's starter throughout the playoffs. The Bears went on to win the 2006 NFC Championship, but lost Super Bowl XLI to the Indianapolis Colts.

After Grossman struggled during the first three outings of the 2007 Chicago Bears season, Smith turned to Griese to lead the team. In his first outing as a Bears starter, Griese threw two touchdowns and three interceptions in a losing effort against the Detroit Lions. The next week, he led the Bears on a game-winning drive against the Philadelphia Eagles, in which he called the plays due to a headset failure. Griese lost the starting job to Grossman after sustaining an injury against the Oakland Raiders during week ten. Griese again replaced Grossman later in the season, after Grossman sustained a knee injury against the Washington Redskins. However, with the Bears out of the playoffs, Kyle Orton started the remaining 3 games of the season.

=== Tampa Bay Buccaneers (second stint) ===
On March 3, 2008, Griese was traded to the Tampa Bay Buccaneers in exchange for a sixth-round pick in the 2009 draft. He started the second game of the season, a home game against the Atlanta Falcons, which the Buccaneers won 24–9. Griese completed 18 of 31 passes, throwing for 160 yards with one touchdown. The next week against the Bears, he threw three interceptions but also had 407 passing yards and two touchdowns to help the Buccaneers beat his former team 27–24 in overtime. He also started the following week, and again despite throwing three interceptions, he completed 15 of 30 passes for 149 yards and a touchdown, leading the Bucs to a victory over the Green Bay Packers 30–21.

Griese started against the Atlanta Falcons again on December 14, subbing for Jeff Garcia who was sidelined with a calf injury. He completed 26 of 37 passes for 269 yards and threw a touchdown. However, he also threw an interception and was sacked four times. The Bucs ended up losing the game in overtime 13–10. His career starting for Tampa Bay was 8–2. He was released on July 13, 2009.

After his release, Griese decided to retire from football.

== Career statistics ==
Legend
	Led the league
**Bold**	Career high

=== NFL ===
Year	Team	Games			Passing								
Year	Team	GP	GS	Record	Cmp	Att	Pct	Yds	Avg	TD	Int	Lng	Rtg
1998	DEN	1	0	–	1	3	33.3	2	0.7	0	1	2	2.8
1999	DEN	14	13	4–9	261	**452**	57.7	3,032	6.7	14	14	**88**	75.6
2000	DEN	10	10	7–3	216	336	64.3	2,688	**8.0**	19	4	61	**102.9**
2001	DEN	15	15	8–7	275	451	61.0	2,827	6.3	**23**	**19**	65	78.5
2002	DEN	13	13	8–5	**291**	436	66.7	**3,214**	7.4	15	15	82	85.6
2003	MIA	5	5	3–2	74	130	56.9	813	6.3	5	6	80	69.2
2004	TB	11	10	4–6	233	336	**69.3**	2,632	7.8	20	12	68	97.5
2005	TB	6	6	5–1	112	174	64.4	1,136	6.5	7	7	80	79.6
2006	CHI	6	0	–	18	32	56.3	220	6.9	1	2	75	62.0
2007	CHI	7	6	3–3	161	262	61.5	1,803	6.9	10	12	81	75.6
2008	TB	5	5	3–2	110	184	59.8	1,073	5.8	5	7	38	69.4
Career		93	83	45–38	1,752	2,796	62.7	19,440	7.0	119	99	88	82.7

=== College ===
Season	Team	Passing								
Season	Team	Cmp	Att	Pct	Yds	Avg	TD	Int	Lng	Rtg
1995	Michigan	127	239	53.4	1,577	6.6	13	**10**	**75**	118.1
1996	Michigan	35	61	57.4	513	**8.4**	3	2	69	137.7
1997	Michigan	**193**	**307**	**62.9**	**2,293**	7.5	**17**	6	58	**140.0**
Career		355	606	58.6	4,383	7.2	33	18	75	131.1

== Broadcasting career ==
From 2009 to 2020, Griese was employed by ESPN, working as an analyst on the network's college football coverage. Griese also served as radio color commentator for 850 KOA (AM)'s coverage of Denver Broncos' football for the 2010 and 2011 seasons.

From 2020 to 2022, Griese joined the booth for Monday Night Football, working alongside Steve Levy and Louis Riddick.

== Coaching career ==
=== San Francisco 49ers ===
On March 4, 2022, it was announced Griese was leaving Monday Night Football to become the quarterbacks coach for the San Francisco 49ers, replacing Rich Scangarello, who left to become the offensive coordinator and quarterbacks coach at Kentucky. He played quarterback for the Tampa Bay Buccaneers from 2004 to 2005 when 49ers head coach Kyle Shanahan was an offensive quality control coach, while also being drafted by Shanahan's father Mike Shanahan while head coach of the Denver Broncos.

On February 26, 2025, it was announced that Griese had left San Francisco's coaching staff in order to spend more time with his family.

== Personal life ==
Griese was a member of the Phi Gamma Delta fraternity and received his bachelor's degree in an individualized concentration from Michigan in 1997.

Griese is founder and board president of Judi's House, a children's grief support center in Denver, Colorado. Brian's mother, Judi Griese, succumbed to a six year battle with breast cancer and passed when Brian was 12. The grieving process was hard for Brian, and so he established Judi's House to serve grieving children in the Denver area.

He also helped establish what would become the Griese, Hutchinson and Woodson Champions for Children's Hearts golf weekend in May 2007. The event benefited the capital campaign for construction of the C.S. Mott Children's Hospital as well as the Michigan Congenital Heart Center (MCHC) which resides within Mott. He also remains involved with the From the Heart Organization, a relationship that dates back to his playing days in Ann Arbor when he would visit Mott every week.

For his work with Judi's House, Griese was awarded the 2011 Patterson Award for Excellence in Sports Philanthropy, presented each year by the Robert Wood Johnson Foundation, which celebrates and promotes the selfless service of people within the world of sports. He was named the recipient of the Big Ten's Dungy-Thompson Humanitarian Award in 2014, and the Big Ten's Ford-Kinnick Leadership Award in 2015, becoming the first individual to be recognized with both of the conference's annual awards. These awards recognize Big Ten football players that have achieved success in the areas of leadership and humanitarianism after their college careers have ended.

Brian and his father, Bob Griese, became the first father-and-son duo in NFL history to both win a Super Bowl. Brian and his father wrote a book together, Undefeated (ISBN 0-7852-7021-3), published in 2000 about their lives through their undefeated seasons and living through the breast cancer illness and death of Brian's mother and Bob's first wife, Judi.

Griese married Brook McClintic, a clinical psychologist, in 2004 in Saint John, U.S. Virgin Islands. The couple met while Griese was playing for the Broncos. The couple have two children together.
