= Tabloid Wars =

- Genre: Reality television
- Country of origin: United States
- Original language: English
- No. of seasons: 1
- No. of episodes: 6

Production
- Executive producers: Jerry Shevick; James Deutch; Belisa Balaban; Ted Skillman
- Running time: 42 minutes
- Production company: Hearst Entertainment Inc.

Original release
- Network: Bravo
- Release: July 24 – August 21, 2006

Tabloid Wars is an American reality television series that premiered on July 24, 2006, on the Bravo cable network. Filmed in mid-2005, the show chronicles the working lives of journalists from the New York Daily News.

Featured writers and editors included Michael Cooke, Lenore Skenazy, Dean Chang, Tracy Connor, Greg Gittrich, Tony Sclafani, Joanna Molloy, Kerry Burke, and Hudson "Hud" Morgan. Despite good reviews from critics, the show was not renewed for a second season.

The show was initially supposed to focus on employees working in the New York Post; the editor in chief Col Allan, however, opted to pass on the show. The series was announced in April 2005 and was initially called The Daily News.
