= Free-range parenting =

Parenting method that encourages a child's independence

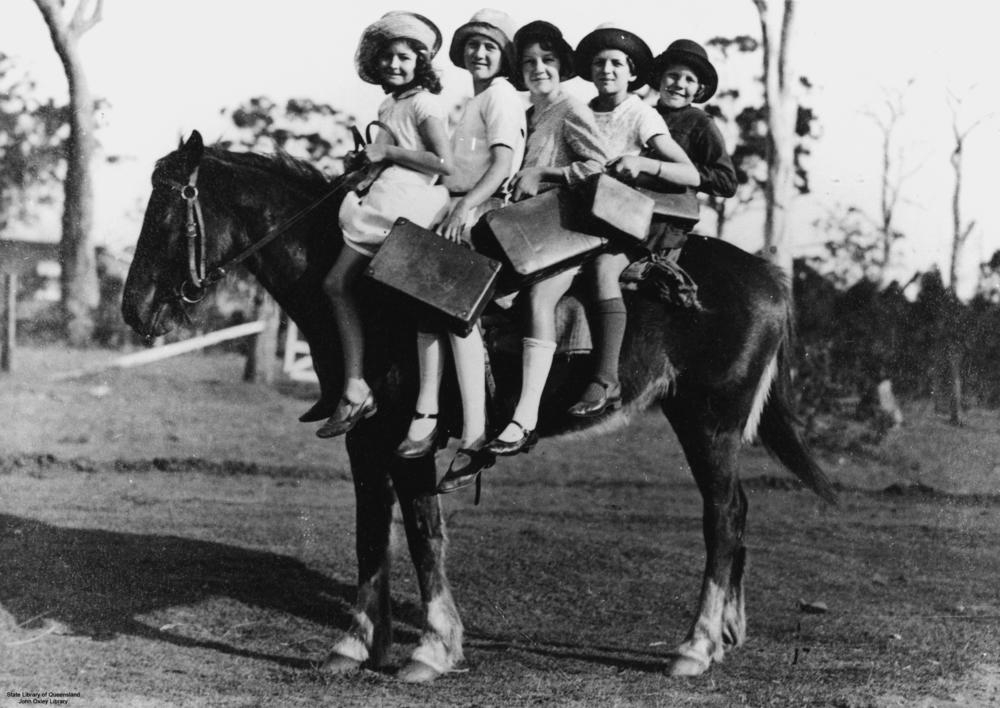
Children riding a horse to school, Glass House Mountains

Free-range parenting is the concept of raising children in the spirit of encouraging them to function independently and with limited parental supervision, in accordance with their age of development and with a reasonable acceptance of realistic personal risks. It is seen as the opposite of helicopter parenting and tiger parenting. A notable text of the movement is Lenore Skenazy's book Free-Range Kids: Giving Our Children the Freedom We Had Without Going Nuts with Worry (2009).

== Overview ==
Hoping to enhance psychoanalysis in the pediatric world, Benjamin Spock authored a book called The Common Sense Book of Baby and Child Care. The book, which was released in 1946 and soon became a best seller, encouraged free-range parenting with the hopes of implementing Freudian philosophy into child-rearing. American journalist Lenore Skenazy has written about the problems of overparenting and overprotection of kids with a particular emphasis on allowing kids to have appropriate levels of freedom and responsibility for their age while still keeping them safe. Her book, Free Range Kids: Giving Our Children the Freedom We Had without Going Nuts with Worry and her related website (April 2008) describe what she sees as the horrors of mainstream schooling, parenting, and organised activities, highlighting the unnecessary protection from risk that limits children's opportunity to mature properly into independent adults, and the unnecessary training, even in using flash cards for preschoolers, thereby limiting their opportunities for personal growth.

== Meitiv incidents ==
The Meitivs are a family living in Silver Spring, Maryland that became a subject of public controversy in 2015 for allowing their children, ages 6 and 10, to go to and from a local park on their own, and for two encounters with government authorities who accused the Meitivs of neglect for this reason.

Incidents:

- On December 20, 2014, Danielle and Alexander (Sasha) Meitiv let their ten-year-old son and six-year-old daughter walk home together from a local park without supervision. About halfway through the walk, the children were stopped by the police and driven home after someone reported seeing them alone. The encounter led to Montgomery County Child Protective Services (CPS) investigating the Meitivs for neglect.
- On April 12, 2015, Danielle and Alexander let their children play at a local park without supervision. They dropped them off at 4 p.m. and told them to come home within two hours. Police received a call to check on the children at 4:58 p.m. and took them into custody. At 7:18 p.m. the police took them to CPS, where they were held without being allowed to contact their parents. Neither the police nor CPS contacted the children's parents directly, and they only located their children later by calling 9-1-1.
- In June 2015, Maryland officials clarified their views about children playing or walking alone outdoors in a new policy directive, saying Child Protective Services should not be involved in such cases unless children have been harmed or face a substantial risk of harm.

The Meitivs' parenting style has been described as "free-range parenting", although Danielle has disputed that label, saying, "It's just parenting, period. I did it as a kid. My parents did it." The encounters between the Meitivs and the government have led to an intense debate among parents and educators. The case has been further studied by legal scholars and other academics.

== Legal status ==
=== United States ===
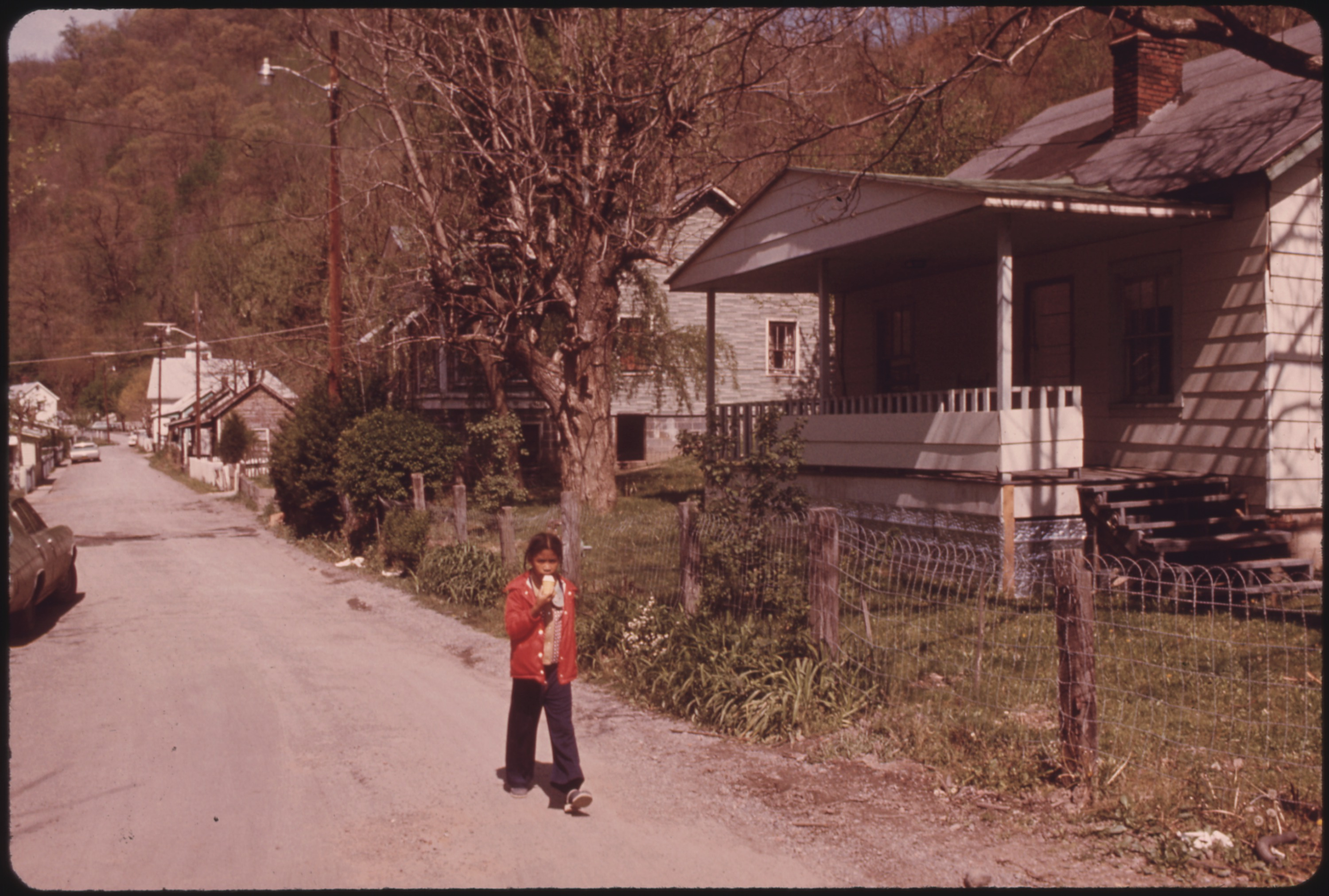
Young girl returning to school after going home during recess to get an ice cream cone; Chattaroy, West Virginia, 1974

In the United States, free-range parenting is limited by laws in many states restricting children's autonomy, such as how old a child must be to walk to school alone. In Massachusetts, such issues are generally addressed on a case-by-case basis. Some states, such as Delaware, or Colorado, based on states' child labor laws, will investigate reports of any child under the age of 12 being left alone, whereas other states, like North Carolina, have firm laws that stipulate a child under 8 should not be left home alone. Illinois is the only other state specifies a minimum age for leaving a child home alone: fourteen. The perception of what constitutes neglect varies greatly depending on the State Law in place, the age of the children and if an injury occurred or not.

In December 2015, however, new federal law contained an amendment added by Sen. Mike Lee stating that:

...nothing in this Act shall...prohibit a child from traveling to and from school on foot or by car, bus, or bike when the parents of the child have given permission; or expose parents to civil or criminal charges for allowing their child to responsibly and safely travel to and from school by a means the parents believe is age appropriate.

A caveat adds, "...nothing in this section 10 shall be construed to preempt State or local laws."

In 2018, Utah became the first state to enact legislation which explicitly protected parents' right to "free range" their children. This was followed by Oklahoma and Texas. As of 2026, 13 states have enacted such laws, and many other states have relaxed their policies to favor childhood independence.

In 2026, US Representatives Blake Moore and Jennifer McClellan introduced the Promoting Childhood Independence and Resilience Act. The act is a federal version of the "Reasonable Childhood Independence" laws passed by many states.

=== Canada ===
There is no legal consensus about when parents can leave their children unsupervised in Canada. However, according to section 218 of the Criminal Code of Canada, a person who "unlawfully abandons or exposes a child who is under the age of ten years, so that its life is or is likely to be endangered or its health is or is likely to be permanently injured" commits a criminal offence. Each province is responsible for its legal framework. Red Cross Canada is offering a training course for children between the age of 9 and 13 (Stay Safe!) to improve their capacity to respond to an emergency case if they stay home alone, suggesting that parents use their own discretion when it comes to their own individual children. The Red Cross babysitting course targets the 11 to 15 years old, suggesting at this age children are able to supervise younger children effectively and safely.

In Ontario, the law is very vague concerning the age at which children might be left alone. Parents are responsible for their children until they are 16 years old but it does not mean that they should be under constant parental supervision. While a staying home age is not specified, parents are not permitted to leave their children unattended in vehicles.

== See also ==
- Children's street culture
- Children's railway
- Free range in animal farming
- Home zone/Play street
- Latchkey kid
- Old Enough!
- Sudbury School
- Unschooling
