= Call to Greatness =

US reality television program

- Directed by: Austin Reading
- Starring: Andreas Wigand; Drew Bell; Ghost; Paul Prado; Rainbow Borden
- Country of origin: United States
- No. of seasons: 1
- No. of episodes: 5

Production
- Running time: 30 minutes

Original release
- Network: MTV
- Release: April 3 – May 1, 2006

Call to Greatness is a reality television series that aired on MTV during 2006, running for a total of five episodes. In the show, a group of five men, known as "Team C2G", traveled around the United States trying to beat world records. This included shot-putting a tuba as far as they could, furthest distance jumping a hearse over a short bus, eating worms, beating a speed record of an unexpected item (such as the fastest living room space, built on a truck), blowing the biggest bubble gum ever, etc.

According to CTV, the group broke 33 records during the filming of the show, individually and collectively.

The cast members were Andreas Wigand, Drew Bell, Ghost, Paul Prado, and Rainbow Borden.

The son of a preacher and an artist, "Ghost" was born on February 28 in Indianapolis, Indiana. He later moved to Atlanta, Georgia, when he was a teenager.

The most intense world record that was broken was done by Rainbow Borden. He drove an ATV 200 feet through a tunnel of fire. The two previous attempts at this very dangerous record resulted in death. The details of those fatalities are unknown. This record never aired on the show because MTV deemed it too deadly for television. It can be viewed on YouTube under "Bow Borden Tunnel of fire"

In late 2006, Call to Greatness was moved to MTV2. The producers of the show decided not to continue on with the series after the move due to budget constraints.

== Episodes ==
No.	Title	Original release date
1	"Texas"	April 3, 2006
2	"California"	April 10, 2006
3	"Virginia"	April 17, 2006
4	"Florida"	April 24, 2006
5	"Louisiana"	May 1, 2006
