= Dallas SWAT =

- Genre: Reality
- Starring: Steve Claggett; Andre Taylor; Christian D'Alesandro; JD Byas; Randy Lancaster; Richard Emberlin; Robert Cockerill; Terigi Rossi
- Country of origin: United States
- Original language: English
- No. of seasons: 3
- No. of episodes: 32

Production
- Executive producers: Charles Tremayne; John X. Kim; Laura Fleury; Neil A. Cohen
- Producer: Sonia Slutsky
- Camera setup: Multi-camera
- Running time: 42-44 minutes
- Production company: ITV Studios America

Original release
- Network: A&E
- Release: January 5, 2006 – September 20, 2007

Dallas SWAT is an American reality television series that premiered January 5, 2006, on A&E. It tracks the day-to-day operations of the Dallas police department's SWAT team. The series aired over three seasons on A&E. During its time, Detroit and Kansas City, Missouri were also featured beginning in the second season.

== Episodes ==
=== Season 1 (2006) ===
No. overall	No. in season	Title	Original release date
1	1	"Dallas #1"	January 5, 2006
2	2	"Dallas #2"	January 12, 2006
3	3	"Dallas #3"	January 19, 2006
4	4	"Dallas #4"	January 26, 2006
5	5	"Dallas #5"	February 9, 2006
6	6	"Dallas #6"	April 20, 2006
7	7	"Dallas #7"	April 27, 2006
8	8	"Dallas #8"	May 4, 2006
9	9	"Dallas #9"	June 1, 2006
10	10	"Dallas #10"	June 8, 2006

=== Season 2 (2006-07) ===
No. overall	No. in season	Title	Original release date
11	1	"Dallas #11"	September 14, 2006
12	2	"Dallas #12"	September 21, 2006
13	3	"Dallas #13"	September 28, 2006
14	4	"Detroit #1"	October 5, 2006
15	5	"Dallas #14"	October 12, 2006
16	6	"Dallas #15"	October 19, 2006
17	7	"Dallas #16"	November 2, 2006
18	8	"Detroit #2"	November 9, 2006
19	9	"Kansas City #1"	November 16, 2006
20	10	"Kansas City #2"	December 7, 2006
21	11	"Kansas City #4"	December 21, 2006
22	12	"Kansas City #3"	January 11, 2007

=== Season 3 (2007) ===
No. overall	No. in season	Title	Original release date
23	1	"Kansas City #5"	July 12, 2007
24	2	"Detroit #4"	July 19, 2007
25	3	"Dallas #17"	July 26, 2007
26	4	"Dallas #18"	August 2, 2007
27	5	"Kansas City #6"	August 9, 2007
28	6	"Detroit #5"	August 16, 2007
29	7	"Dallas #19"	August 23, 2007
30	8	"Kansas City #7"	August 30, 2007
31	9	"Dallas #20"	September 13, 2007
32	10	"Dallas #21"	September 20, 2007
