= Paul Douglas (cameraman) =

- Born: 1957
- Died: 29 May 2006 (aged 48–49); Karrada, Baghdad, Iraq
- Cause of death: Car bomb
- Occupations: Journalist and camera operator
- Years active: 17+
- Employer: CBS News
- Known for: video images of war and conflict

Paul Anthony Douglas (1957 – 29 May 2006) was a British CBS News journalist and TV camera operator, who, along with soundman James Brolan, was killed from an explosion of a car bomb in the Karrada district, Baghdad, Iraq. He was best known for his video images from war zones and areas of conflict that he had been assigned to since the early 1990s.

== Career ==
Paul Douglas was based in London with CBS News, he had worked with the network since the early 1990s, about 17 years. Prior to working for CBS, he worked for ITV. He first worked as a sound man and then became a camera operator. His career as a news camera operator took him to other wars and conflicts besides Iraq, and he was in Sarajevo, Bosnia from at least 1993–1994 covering the Siege of Sarajevo, Rwanda, Afghanistan, and Pakistan. Douglas had been assigned with Dan Rather when the CBS anchor reported from Afghanistan, Israel and Iraq.

== Death ==
Assigned to cover the Iraq war by CBS, correspondent Kimberly Dozier, Douglas, Brolan were embedded with the 4th Brigade Combat Team of the 4th Infantry Division. Initially, the CBS crew was assigned to cover a story about what US troops were doing on "Memorial Day" for a holiday TV news report, but the team was diverted to the Karrada peninsula location where the 500-pound bomb was detonated as the team examined a checkpoint that had been bombed on the previous day. Paul Douglas and Brolan were outside of their vehicle with protective gear when the car bomb exploded and killed them both along with Captain James "Alex" Funkhouser and a translator named "Sam". Dozier, who was walking behind the four killed, was critically injured in the attack. Six soldiers were also injured in the attack.

Douglas' death was listed in the UK as an "unlawful killing" by a British coroner. In addition, according to a US military report, the event was not coordinated with secure communication devices. The patrol made a surprise inspection of a checkpoint at the time of the blast.

== Context ==
At the time, CBS President Sean McManus said Iraq was "the most dangerous place on Earth right now."

The Paris-based Reporters Without Borders, an international press freedom organisation, said in reaction, "The security situation is becoming more and more alarming for the press in Iraq. Although better protected, embedded journalists are not completely isolated from the dangers. A total of 96 journalists and media assistants (22 of them foreigners) have been killed since the start of the war. Only six of them were embedded with the US-led coalition forces."

The New York-based NGO Committee to Protect Journalists, reiterated their Parisian counterpart, "The news profession has lost nearly 100 people in this devastating war – 71 journalists and 26 support staffers. Dozens more have been injured or kidnapped in one of the most dangerous conflicts that journalists have ever covered."

Reporters Without Borders noted that the Iraq War had resulted in the largest numbers of killed journalists since World War II.

== Reactions ==
Koïchiro Matsuura, director-general of UNESCO, issued a statement, "The death toll among media personnel, both national and international, in Iraq has reached truly alarming levels. Once again, I wish to express my sincere admiration for the courage of journalists and media workers who brave intolerable levels of danger to continue informing the world about events in Iraq. They are carrying out work which is essential for the reconstruction and consolidation of democracy in Iraq. ... I urge all authorities concerned, to spare no effort in seeking to improve the conditions of safety of journalists, media workers and support staff committed to the fundamental human right of freedom of expression in Iraq."

== Personal ==
Paul Douglas' father lives in Grenada and condemned the US presence in Iraq and the circumstances under which his son was killed. Paul and his wife of 30 years, Linda Douglas, had two daughters, Kelly and Joanne, and three grandchildren, Charlie, Georgia and Kai.

Paul is remembered fondly, with a small plaque at St Bride's Church, the Journalist's Church and another at Twickenham Rugby Stadium, of which he was a frequent attendee. He was known for his kind nature, big heart, for his bellowing renditions of Swing Low, Sweet Chariot and is, to this day, sorely missed.

Douglas, 48 years old at the time of his death, was laid to rest in Bedford, England, UK.

== In popular culture ==
A 2011 cricket match was organised in honour of the Douglas and his colleague Brolan by the Rory Peck Trust, a charitable organisation for fallen journalists.

Dozier published her book "Breathing the Fire" in 2008 after her recovery, which deals with her colleagues and the attack. While recovering, she asked about her crew. In an interview with BBC News, she said she struggled psychologically with survivor's guilt.

On World Press Freedom Day 2007, which is held annually on third day of May, the city of Bayeux, France, officially dedicated a memorial for journalists who have been killed while reporting. The number of names of journalists on the memorial numbered 1,889 who had been killed since 1944, according to Reporters Without Borders. Bayeux was selected because its symbolic for its 7 June 1944 liberation by Allies during World War II due to its proximity to the invasion of Normandy.
