= Bob Woodruff =

American journalist

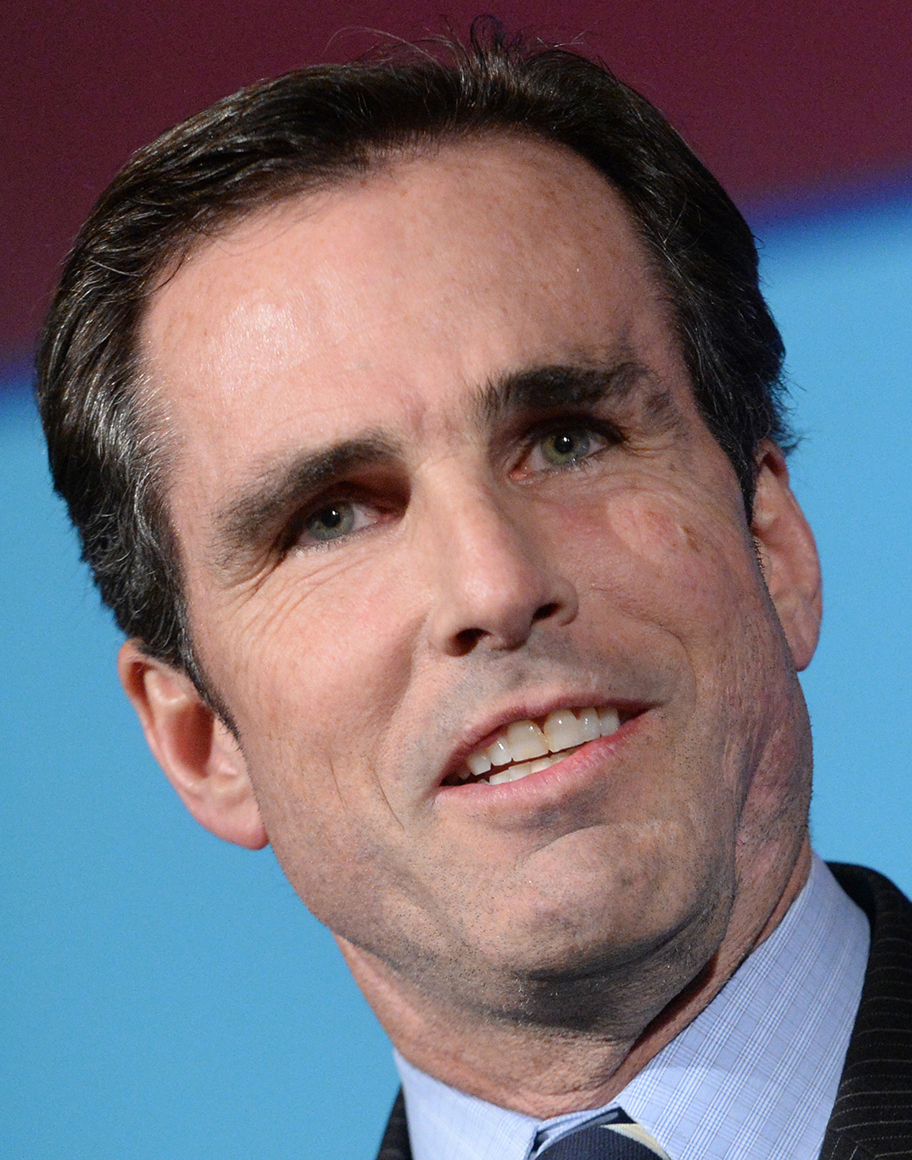
- Woodruff in 2015
- Born: Robert Warren Woodruff; August 18, 1961 (age 65); Bloomfield Hills, Michigan, U.S.
- Education: Colgate University (Bachelor of Arts); University of Michigan (Juris Doctor)
- Occupation: Television journalist
- Years active: 1989–present
- Notable credit(s): ABC World News Tonight co-anchor (2006); ABC News reporter (1996–present)
- Spouse: Lee McConaughy
- Children: 4
- Website: Official ABC biography Bob Woodruff Foundation Website

Robert Warren Woodruff (born August 18, 1961) is an American television journalist. Since 1996, he has served as a reporter for ABC News. Woodruff co-anchored ABC World News Tonight in 2006 with journalist Elizabeth Vargas. He was severely injured by an IED explosion during a reporting trip to Iraq that January, and he recovered over an extended period before returning to air.

== Early life and education ==
Woodruff was born on August 18, 1961 in Bloomfield Hills, Michigan, the son of Frances Ann (Dawson) and Robert Norman Woodruff Jr., real estate agents.

Woodruff graduated from the private Cranbrook Kingswood school in Bloomfield Hills, Michigan in 1979. He earned a B.A. in 1983 from Colgate University, where he played lacrosse—finishing his career with 184 points, second all-time at Colgate. Woodruff earned a J.D. from the University of Michigan Law School in 1987, and he is an alumnus of Theta Chi fraternity.

== Career ==
After graduating from law school, Woodruff worked as a bankruptcy associate at Shearman & Sterling, LLP in New York City. In 1989, while Woodruff was teaching law in Beijing, China, CBS News hired him as an on-screen interpreter during the Tiananmen Square protests of 1989. Shortly thereafter, he left the law practice and became a full-time correspondent, initially working for several local stations.

=== ABC News ===
Woodruff began working for ABC News in 1996. He succeeded Peter Jennings as a co-anchor of ABC World News Tonight in December 2005 with Elizabeth Vargas. In January 2006, Woodruff was critically wounded by a roadside bomb in Iraq.

==== Wounded in Iraq ====
In 2006, Woodruff was wounded while covering the war in Iraq. He suffered a traumatic brain injury and was not expected to survive. However, Woodruff recovered, and is determined to help other Americans who were similarly wounded in war.

On January 29, 2006, Woodruff and Canadian cameraman Doug Vogt were seriously injured in an explosion from an improvised explosive device near Taji, Iraq, about 12 miles (19 km) north of Baghdad. Woodruff had traveled with an ABC News team to Israel to report on the aftermath of the 2006 Palestinian elections, and then via Amman, Jordan to Baghdad, so that he could meet with troops before President George W. Bush's State of the Union address for 2006.

At the time of the attack, they were embedded with the U.S. 4th Infantry Division, traveling in an Iraqi MT-LB. Woodruff and Vogt were standing with their heads above a hatch, apparently filming a stand-up. Both men were wearing body armor and protective helmets at the time. Woodruff sustained shrapnel wounds; Vogt was struck by shrapnel in the head, and suffered a broken shoulder. After being stabilized at the 10th Combat Support Hospital in Baghdad, both men were flown to Balad and underwent surgery for head injuries with a joint Army and Air Force neurosurgical team at the U.S. Air Force hospital south of Balad, Iraq, located in Camp Anaconda, and they were reported to be in stable condition. Tom Brokaw reported on the Today show that Woodruff had a portion of his skull removed during surgery to reduce the damage from brain swelling.

Woodruff and Vogt were evacuated to the U.S. Army's Landstuhl Regional Medical Center in Germany overnight on Sunday, January 29. On ABC World News Tonight that evening, anchor Elizabeth Vargas discussed the dangers of reporting in a combat zone.

After leaving Germany, Woodruff was treated for several weeks at Bethesda Naval Hospital in Bethesda, Maryland.

==== Recovery from injuries ====
Woodruff was kept in a medically induced coma for 36 days to assist his recovery, and ABC News temporarily assigned Good Morning America anchors Charles Gibson and Diane Sawyer to alternate duties on the evening newscast as co-anchors with Vargas. Vogt meanwhile was reported to be awake, mobile, and recovering.

As of March 7, 2006, Woodruff's brother reported that the ABC anchor was beginning to walk, recognize friends and family, and speak in several languages. However, he struggled with expressive aphasia for more than a year after the injury. Woodruff was transferred on March 16, 2006, to a medical facility closer to his home in Westchester County, New York, a sign of "continued progress in all respects", ABC News President, David Westin, wrote in an email to staffers. Westin's email noted that Woodruff was able to get around, talk to and joke with his family, but that "months of further recuperation" were required.

On April 6, 2006, ABC News released photos of Woodruff recovering at home, with a letter thanking everyone for their support and kindness during his ongoing recovery. Woodruff especially thanked the soldiers, doctors, and nurses who had saved his life. On December 29, 2006, Woodruff's wife, Lee, an editor at Family Fun Magazine appeared on Good Morning America to discuss family activities to celebrate the New Year. During the report, anchor Kate Snow asked Lee about her husband's condition. Lee said that Bob was doing well and was currently filming a television documentary about his experiences. She also revealed that he had been back to Iraq since the incident to visit the soldiers with whom he was traveling at the time of his injury.

==== Consequences at ABC News ====
ABC World News Tonight remained second in the Nielsen Media Research rankings, but it had lost some ground to NBC's then first-place Nightly News, anchored by Brian Williams before his ouster. Bob Schieffer on CBS Evening News also closed the gap with ABC after Woodruff's injury. On May 23, 2006, Vargas announced her resignation from WNT, citing her doctors' recommendation to cut back her schedule considerably due to her upcoming maternity leave and her wish to spend more time with her new baby. Gibson was then named sole anchor of the show, effective May 29, 2006.

==== Return to air ====
On February 27, 2007, Woodruff appeared on Good Morning America, ABC World News with Charles Gibson, and The Oprah Winfrey Show in advance of a documentary that aired on ABC later that evening. Despite having made great progress in his recovery, during an interview with Diane Sawyer, Woodruff had some difficulty remembering words and details, such as the name of the Vietnam War and the word "injury". The hour-long documentary To Iraq and Back: Bob Woodruff Reports explored the consequences of traumatic brain injury and highlighted the difficulties brain injured veterans face finding treatment—a subject that had first appeared in Discover magazine several weeks earlier, and was elaborated on by The Washington Post reporters in the exposé "Painting Over the Problems at Walter Reed's Building 18".

Woodruff resumed his contributions to ABC World News with Charles Gibson the following day, February 28, with the first in a series of follow-up reports centering on the problems that wounded American soldiers are encountering in their treatment and recovery, particularly at Walter Reed Army Medical Center. Starting March 7, he was scheduled to begin reporting for Nightline "at regular intervals".

On July 12, 2008, Woodruff began hosting the weekly ABC News–produced newscast Focus Earth with Bob Woodruff on the Planet Green television channel. On Focus Earth, Woodruff covered the environmental news of the week, looking at subjects ranging from climate impact, environmental policy, political debate, and world events, as well as how climate change affects religious and cultural views and issues.

In 2014, Woodruff worked with ESPN and ABC Sports as a reporter and host for the 2014 FIFA World Cup, normally alongside ESPN Brazil senior writer Rubens Pozzi.

In 2020, he started a National Geographic show Rogue Trip, with his son Mack. The show premiered on Disney+.

== Bob Woodruff Foundation ==
The Bob Woodruff Foundation (BWF) is a nonprofit that supports post-9/11 impacted service members, veterans, and their families after they return home.

In 2014, Woodruff was awarded the third highest honor within the Department of the Army Civilian Awards, the Outstanding Civilian Service Award, for substantial contributions to the U.S. Army community through his work with the Woodruff Foundation.

== Personal life ==
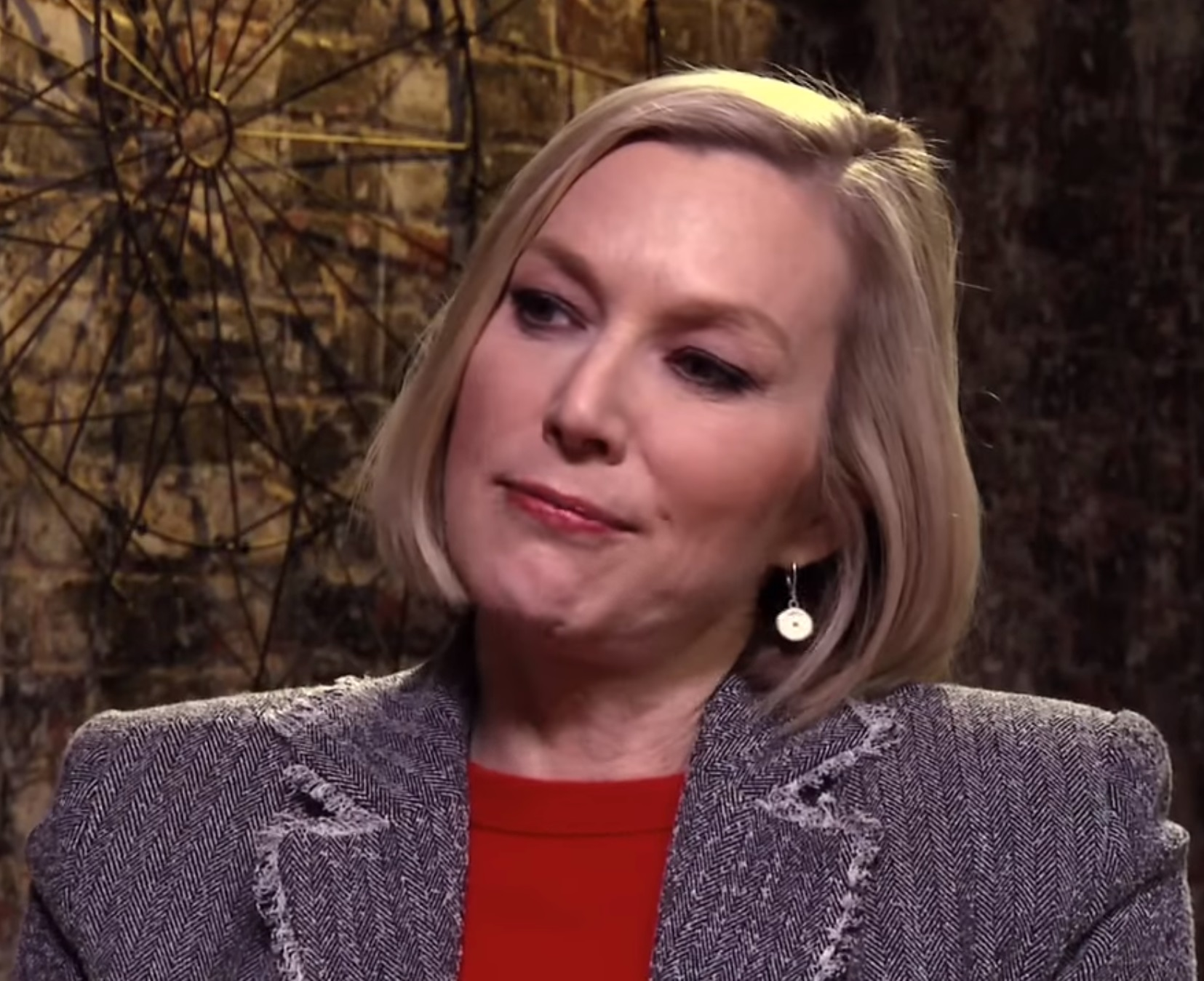
Lee Woodruff hosting Archetypes, an interview program, in 2013

Woodruff married Lee McConaughy in 1988, and they have four children, Macklin Robert (Mack), Cathryn, and twins Claire and Nora.

== Awards ==
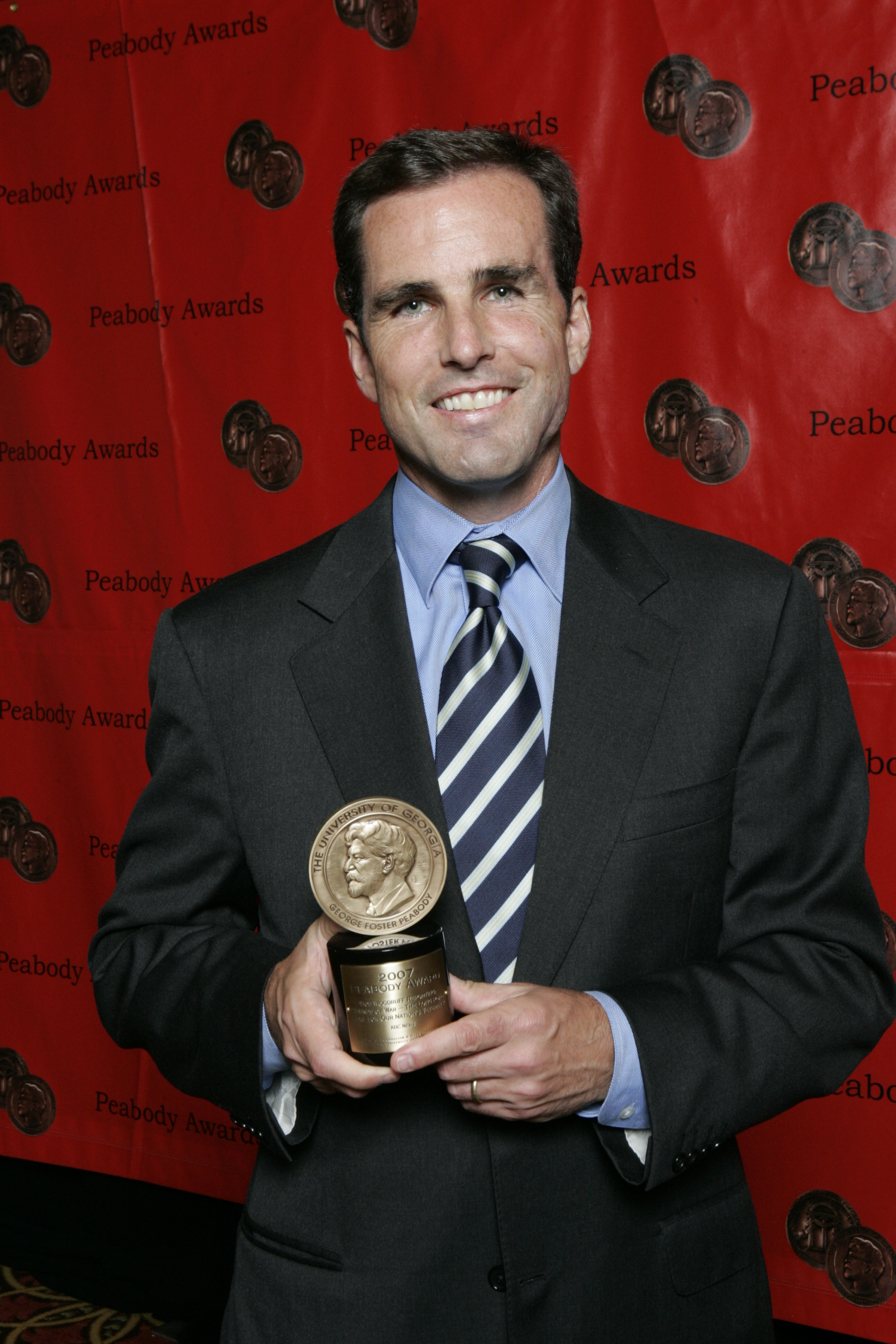
Bob Woodruff at the 67th Annual Peabody Awards for Wounds of War-The Long Road Home for Our Nation's Veterans

Woodruff has received numerous awards, including:

- Radio and Television Association's David Bloom Award for Excellence in Enterprise (2006);
- Peabody Award for Bob Woodruff Reporting: Wounds of War—The Long Road Home for Our Nation's Veterans (2007);
- Iraq and Afghanistan Veterans of America's (IAVA) "Civilian Service Award" for his dedication to our nation's newest generation of veterans (2007);
- Los Angeles Press Club's Daniel Pearl Award for Courage and Integrity in Journalism (2008).
- NCAA Silver Anniversary Awards (2008)
- American Legion National Commander Public Relations Award (2013)
- Public Leadership in Neurology Award - American Brain Federation/American Academy of Neurology (2016)
- National Association of Broadcasters Distinguished Service Award (2016)

Media offices
Preceded by Peter Jennings	World News Tonight Co-Anchor; January 3 – May 26, 2006 (last anchored January 27, 2006); With: Elizabeth Vargas	Succeeded by Charles Gibson
