= 2006–07 United States network television schedule =

The 2006–07 network television schedule for the six major English language commercial broadcast networks in the United States covers the prime time hours from September 2006 to August 2007. The schedule is followed by a list per network of returning series, new series, and series cancelled after the 2005–06 season.

The schedules include the four most popular networks (CBS, ABC, NBC, and Fox) and two new networks introduced as part of the broadcast TV realignment: The CW (includes The CW Plus), and MyNetworkTV.

PBS is not included; member stations have local flexibility over most of their schedules and broadcast times for network shows may vary. Ion Television (renamed from its original rebrand, i: Independent Television, on January 27) is also not included since the network's schedule consisted mainly of syndicated reruns and movies.

Each of the 30 highest-rated shows released in May 2007 is listed with its rank and rating as determined by Nielsen Media Research.

New series are highlighted in bold.

Repeat airings or same-day rebroadcasts are indicated by (R).

All times are U.S. Eastern and Pacific Time (except for some live sports or events). Subtract for one hour for Central, Mountain, Alaska and Hawaii–Aleutian times.

All sporting events air live in all time zones in U.S. Eastern time, with local and/or late-night programming (including Fox affiliates during the 10 p.m. ET/PT hour) by affiliates after game completion.

== Legend ==
- Light blue indicates local programming.
- Gray indicates encore programming.
- Blue-gray indicates news programming.
- Light green indicates sporting events.
- Red indicates series being burned off and other irregularly scheduled programs, including specials and movies.
- highlight Yellow highlights indicates the top-10 most watched programs of the season.
- highlight Cyan highlights indicates numbers 11-20 most watched programs of the season.
- highlight Magenta highlights indicates numbers 21-30 most watched programs of the season.
- highlight Highlights indicates that it falls in multiple of the above categories.

== Sunday ==
Network		7:00 p.m.	7:30 p.m.	8:00 p.m.	8:30 p.m.	9:00 p.m.	9:30 p.m.	10:00 p.m.	10:30 p.m.
ABC		America's Funniest Home Videos		Extreme Makeover: Home Edition (26/7.7)		Desperate Housewives (9/10.8)		**Brothers & Sisters** (30/7.3) (Tied with The King of Queens and **Are You Smarter than a 5th Grader?**)	
CBS	Fall	60 Minutes (20/8.7) (Tied with Shark)		The Amazing Race		Cold Case (16/8.9) (Tied with CSI: NY)		Without a Trace (12/9.4)	
CBS	Winter	60 Minutes (20/8.7) (Tied with Shark)		Various programming		Cold Case (16/8.9) (Tied with CSI: NY)		Without a Trace (12/9.4)	
CBS	Late winter	60 Minutes (20/8.7) (Tied with Shark)		The Amazing Race: All-Stars		Cold Case (16/8.9) (Tied with CSI: NY)		Without a Trace (12/9.4)	
CBS	Spring	60 Minutes (20/8.7) (Tied with Shark)		Various programming		Cold Case (16/8.9) (Tied with CSI: NY)		Without a Trace (12/9.4)	
CBS	Summer	60 Minutes (20/8.7) (Tied with Shark)		Big Brother		Cold Case (16/8.9) (Tied with CSI: NY)		Without a Trace (12/9.4)	
The CW	Fall	Various programming				America's Next Top Model (R)		Local programming	
The CW	Mid-fall	Various programming		7th Heaven		America's Next Top Model (R)		Local programming	
The CW	Late fall	Reba (R)	Reba	7th Heaven		America's Next Top Model (R)		Local programming	
The CW	Winter	Reba (R)	Reba	7th Heaven		Beauty and the Geek (R)		Local programming	
The CW	Late winter	**Pussycat Dolls Present:** **The Search for the Next Doll** (R)		7th Heaven		America's Next Top Model (R)		Local programming	
The CW	Spring	7th Heaven (R)		7th Heaven		America's Next Top Model (R)		Local programming	
The CW	Summer	Reba (R)		7th Heaven		Supernatural (R)		Local programming	
The CW	Mid-summer	Smallville (R)		7th Heaven		**Pussycat Dolls Present: The Search for the Next Doll** (R)		Local programming	
Fox	Fall	Fox NFL (4:15 p.m.)	The OT	The Simpsons	American Dad!	Family Guy	The War at Home	Local programming	
Fox	Winter	Various programming		The Simpsons	King of the Hill	Family Guy	American Dad!	Local programming	
Fox	Late winter	Various programming	The War at Home	The Simpsons	**The Winner**	Family Guy	**The Winner**	Local programming	
Fox	Spring	The War at Home (R)	The War at Home	The Simpsons	King of the Hill	Family Guy	American Dad!	Local programming	
Fox	Mid-spring	King of the Hill (R)	King of the Hill	The Simpsons	The Simpsons (R)	Family Guy	American Dad!	Local programming	
Fox	Summer	The War at Home (R)	King of the Hill	The Simpsons	The Loop	Family Guy	The Loop	Local programming	
Fox	Mid-summer	**'Til Death** (R)	King of the Hill	The Simpsons	American Dad! (R)	Family Guy	Family Guy (R)	Local programming	
NBC	Fall	**Football Night in America**		NBC Sunday Night Football(8:15 p.m.) (continued to game completion) (11/10.5)					
NBC	Winter	Deal or No Deal		**Grease: You're the** **One That I Want!**		The Apprentice		Crossing Jordan	
NBC	Late winter	Dateline NBC		**Grease: You're the** **One That I Want!**		Deal or No Deal		The Apprentice	
NBC	Spring	Dateline NBC				Deal or No Deal		The Apprentice	
NBC	Mid-spring	Dateline NBC				Various programming			
NBC	Late spring	Dateline NBC				**Friday Night Lights** (R)		Law & Order: Special Victims Unit (R)	
NBC	Summer	Dateline NBC				Law & Order (R)		Law & Order: Special Victims Unit (R)	

== Monday ==
Network		8:00 p.m.	8:30 p.m.	9:00 p.m.	9:30 p.m.	10:00 p.m.	10:30 p.m.
ABC	Fall	Wife Swap		The Bachelor		What About Brian	
ABC	Winter	Wife Swap		Supernanny		What About Brian	
ABC	Spring	Dancing with the Stars (3/12.7)			The Bachelor		
ABC	Late spring	Wife Swap (R)		**The Ex-Wives Club**		Supernanny (R)	
ABC	Summer	Wife Swap (R)		Extreme Makeover		Supernanny (R)	
ABC	Mid-summer	Wife Swap (R)		**Fat March**		Supernanny (R)	
CBS	Fall	**The Class**	How I Met Your Mother	Two and a Half Men (14/9.1)	The New Adventures of Old Christine	CSI: Miami (10/10.7)	
CBS	Mid-fall	How I Met Your Mother	**The Class**	Two and a Half Men (14/9.1)	The New Adventures of Old Christine	CSI: Miami (10/10.7)	
CBS	Winter	How I Met Your Mother	**The Class**	Two and a Half Men (14/9.1)	**Rules of Engagement** (25/7.8)	CSI: Miami (10/10.7)	
CBS	Late winter	How I Met Your Mother	The New Adventures of Old Christine	Two and a Half Men (14/9.1)	**Rules of Engagement** (25/7.8)	CSI: Miami (10/10.7)	
CBS	Spring	How I Met Your Mother	The New Adventures of Old Christine	Two and a Half Men (14/9.1)	The King of Queens (30/7.3) (Tied with **Brothers & Sisters** and **Are You Smarter than a 5th Grader?**)	CSI: Miami (10/10.7)	
CBS	Late spring	**Creature Comforts**	The New Adventures of Old Christine	Two and a Half Men (14/9.1)	How I Met Your Mother (R)	CSI: Miami (10/10.7)	
CBS	Summer	How I Met Your Mother (R)	The New Adventures of Old Christine	Two and a Half Men (14/9.1)	**Rules of Engagement** (R)	CSI: Miami (10/10.7)	
The CW		Everybody Hates Chris	All of Us	Girlfriends	**The Game**	Local programming	
Fox	Fall	Prison Break		**Vanished**		Local programming	
Fox	Mid-fall	Prison Break		**Justice**		Local programming	
Fox	Late fall	Prison Break		House (R)		Local programming	
Fox	Winter	Prison Break		24 (27/7.4) (Tied with Ugly Betty and ER)		Local programming	
Fox	Spring	House (R)		24 (27/7.4) (Tied with Ugly Betty and ER)		Local programming	
Fox	Mid-spring	**Drive**		24 (27/7.4) (Tied with Ugly Betty and ER)		Local programming	
Fox	Late spring	Various programming		Hell's Kitchen		Local programming	
Fox	Summer	Various programming		Hell's Kitchen		Local programming	
MNT	Fall	**Desire**		**Fashion House**		Local programming	
MNT	Late fall	**Wicked Wicked Games**		**Watch Over Me**		Local programming	
MNT	Winter	**IFL Battleground**				Local programming	
MNT	Spring	**IFL Battleground**				Local programming	
MNT	Summer	**IFL Battleground**				Local programming	
NBC	Fall	Deal or No Deal (13/9.2)		**Heroes** (23/8.0)		**Studio 60 on the Sunset Strip**	
NBC	Winter	Deal or No Deal (13/9.2)		**Heroes** (23/8.0)		**The Black Donnellys**	
NBC	Late winter	Deal or No Deal (13/9.2)				**The Black Donnellys**	
NBC	Spring	Deal or No Deal (13/9.2)		**Heroes** (23/8.0)		**The Real Wedding Crashers**	
NBC	Summer	**Age of Love** (R)		**Age of Love**		Dateline NBC	
NBC	Mid-summer	**Thank God You're Here** (R)		**Heroes** (R)		Dateline NBC	

- Note: **Drive** premiered on Fox on April 16, 2007, at 8 p.m. and was removed from the schedule after airing two episodes.

== Tuesday ==
Network		8:00 p.m.	8:30 p.m.	9:00 p.m.	9:30 p.m.	10:00 p.m.	10:30 p.m.
ABC	Fall	Dancing with the Stars (3/12.7)			**Help Me Help You**	Boston Legal	
ABC	Late fall	Various programming		**Big Day**	**Help Me Help You**	Boston Legal	
ABC	Winter	America's Funniest Home Videos (R)		**Big Day**		Boston Legal	
ABC	Mid-winter	America's Funniest Home Videos (R)		Primetime: The Outsiders		Boston Legal	
ABC	Spring	Dancing with the Stars (R)		Dancing with the Stars (3/12.7)		Boston Legal	
ABC	Mid-spring	George Lopez (R)	George Lopez	Dancing with the Stars (3/12.7)		Boston Legal	
ABC	Summer	According to Jim (R)		**Shaq's Big Challenge**		**Primetime: Family Secrets**	
ABC	Mid-summer	**Just for Laughs**		**Shaq's Big Challenge**		**Primetime: Family Secrets**	
ABC	Late summer	**Just for Laughs**		**i-Caught**		**Primetime Crime**	
CBS	Early fall	NCIS (15/9.0)		The Unit		**Smith**	
CBS	Fall	NCIS (15/9.0)		The Unit		Various programming	
CBS	Mid-fall	NCIS (15/9.0)		The Unit		**3 lbs**	
CBS	Late fall	NCIS (15/9.0)		The Unit		Various programming	
CBS	Spring	NCIS (15/9.0)		The Unit		48 Hours (R)	
CBS	Summer	NCIS (15/9.0)		Big Brother		Various programming	
CBS	Late summer	**Power of 10**		Big Brother		NCIS (R)	
The CW	Fall	Gilmore Girls		Veronica Mars		Local programming	
The CW	Winter	Gilmore Girls		**Pussycat Dolls Present: The Search for the Next Doll**		Local programming	
The CW	Spring	Gilmore Girls		Veronica Mars		Local programming	
The CW	Summer	Gilmore Girls		Beauty and the Geek (R)		Local programming	
Fox	Fall	House (8/11.1)		**Standoff**		Local programming	
Fox	Mid-fall	**Standoff**		House (8/11.1)		Local programming	
Fox	Winter	American Idol (2/16.8)		House (8/11.1)		Local programming	
Fox	Spring	**On the Lot**		House (8/11.1)		Local programming	
Fox	Summer	**On the Lot**		House (8/11.1)		Local programming	
MNT	Fall	**Desire**		**Fashion House**		Local programming	
MNT	Late fall	**Wicked Wicked Games**		**Watch Over Me**		Local programming	
MNT	Winter	**American Heiress**				Local programming	
MNT	Spring	**My Tuesday Night Movie**				Local programming	
MNT	Summer	**My Tuesday Night Movie**				Local programming	
NBC	Fall	**Friday Night Lights**		Law & Order: Criminal Intent		Law & Order: Special Victims Unit (24/7.9)	
NBC	Winter	Dateline NBC		Law & Order: Criminal Intent		Law & Order: Special Victims Unit (24/7.9)	
NBC	Spring	America's Got Talent				Law & Order: Special Victims Unit (24/7.9)	
NBC	Summer	America's Got Talent			**The Singing Bee**	Law & Order: Special Victims Unit (24/7.9)	

- Note: Pirate Master aired at 10 p.m. ET on CBS on June 10 and 17, 2007 and was removed from the schedule after airing two episodes.
- Note: **Fast Cars and Superstars: The Gillette Young Guns Celebrity Race** aired at 8 p.m. ET on ABC on June 12 and 19, 2007.

== Wednesday ==
Network		8:00 p.m.	8:30 p.m.	9:00 p.m.	9:30 p.m.	10:00 p.m.	10:30 p.m.
ABC	Fall	Dancing with the Stars (3/12.7)		Lost (22/8.3)		**The Nine**	
ABC	Late fall	**Show Me the Money**		**Day Break**		Primetime: Basic Instincts	
ABC	Winter	According to Jim		**The Knights of Prosperity**	**In Case of Emergency**	Primetime: Medical Mysteries	
ABC	Mid-winter	George Lopez	**The Knights of Prosperity**	According to Jim	**In Case of Emergency**	Primetime: Medical Mysteries	
ABC	Late winter	George Lopez	**The Knights of Prosperity**	Lost (R)		Lost (22/8.3)	
ABC	Spring	George Lopez	According to Jim (R)	According to Jim	**In Case of Emergency**	Lost (22/8.3)	
ABC	Mid-spring	According to Jim	**Notes from the Underbelly**	Lost (R)		Lost (22/8.3)	
ABC	Summer	**The Next Best Thing**		American Inventor		**Traveler**	
ABC	Late summer	According to Jim	According to Jim	NASCAR in Primetime		Primetime: The Outsiders	
CBS	Fall	**Jericho**		Criminal Minds (18/8.8) (Tied with Survivor)		CSI: NY (16/8.9) (Tied with Cold Case)	
CBS	Winter	The King of Queens (30/7.3) (Tied with **Brothers & Sisters** and **Are You Smarter Than a 5th Grader?**)	The King of Queens (R)	Criminal Minds (18/8.8) (Tied with Survivor)		CSI: NY (16/8.9) (Tied with Cold Case)	
CBS	Mid-winter	**Armed & Famous**		Criminal Minds (18/8.8) (Tied with Survivor)		CSI: NY (16/8.9) (Tied with Cold Case)	
CBS	Late winter	**Jericho**		Criminal Minds (18/8.8) (Tied with Survivor)		CSI: NY (16/8.9) (Tied with Cold Case)	
CBS	Spring	**Jericho**		Criminal Minds (18/8.8) (Tied with Survivor)		CSI: NY (16/8.9) (Tied with Cold Case)	
CBS	Summer	The King of Queens (R)	The King of Queens (R)	Criminal Minds (18/8.8) (Tied with Survivor)		CSI: NY (16/8.9) (Tied with Cold Case)	
CBS	Late summer	**Power of 10**		Criminal Minds (18/8.8) (Tied with Survivor)		CSI: NY (16/8.9) (Tied with Cold Case)	
The CW	Fall	America's Next Top Model		One Tree Hill		Local programming	
The CW	Winter	Beauty and the Geek		One Tree Hill		Local programming	
The CW	Spring	America's Next Top Model		Pussycat Dolls Present: The Search for the Next Doll (R)		Local programming	
The CW	Late spring	America's Next Top Model		One Tree Hill		Local programming	
The CW	Summer	**Hidden Palms**		One Tree Hill		Local programming	
The CW	Mid-summer	**Hidden Palms**		**Hidden Palms**		Local programming	
The CW	Late summer	America's Next Top Model (R)		America's Next Top Model (R)		Local programming	
Fox	Fall	Bones		**Justice**		Local programming	
Fox	Mid-fall	Bones		**The Rich List**		Local programming	
Fox	Winter	Bones		Bones (R)		Local programming	
Fox	Mid-winter	Bones		American Idol (1/17.3)		Local programming	
Fox	Spring	Bones		American Idol (1/17.3)	**'Til Death**	Local programming	
Fox	Mid-spring	Bones		American Idol (1/17.3)		Local programming	
Fox	Summer	So You Think You Can Dance				Local programming	
Fox	Mid-summer	So You Think You Can Dance			**Don't Forget the Lyrics!**	Local programming	
Fox	Late summer	**Anchorwoman**		**Anchorwoman**		Local programming	
MNT	Fall	**Desire**		**Fashion House**		Local programming	
MNT	Winter	**Wicked Wicked Games**		**Watch Over Me**		Local programming	
MNT	Spring	**Saints & Sinners**				Local programming	
MNT	Mid-spring	**American Heiress**		**Saints & Sinners**		Local programming	
MNT	Summer	MyNetworkTV Special Presentation				Local programming	
NBC	Fall	**30 Rock**	**Twenty Good Years**	The Biggest Loser		**Kidnapped**	
NBC	Mid-fall	**30 Rock**	**Twenty Good Years**	The Biggest Loser		Dateline NBC	
NBC	Late fall	The Biggest Loser				Medium	
NBC	Winter	Friday Night Lights		Deal or No Deal		Medium	
NBC	Spring	Friday Night Lights		Crossing Jordan		Medium	
NBC	Mid-spring	**Thank God You're Here**		Crossing Jordan		Medium	
NBC	Summer	Last Comic Standing (R)		Last Comic Standing		Dateline NBC	
NBC	Mid-summer	Most Outrageous Moments	**30 Rock** (R)	Last Comic Standing		Dateline NBC	

NOTES: Fox premiered The Rich Li$t on November 1, 2006, at 9PM ET. Due to low ratings, the show was cancelled two days later.

ABC premiered The Great American Dream Vote at 8PM ET on March 28, 2007 (after airing the pilot the previous night). The show was cancelled on March 29, 2007.

Anchorwoman aired two back-to-back episodes on August 22, 2007, on Fox. The show was cancelled a few days later.

== Thursday ==
Network		8:00 p.m.	8:30 p.m.	9:00 p.m.	9:30 p.m.	10:00 p.m.	10:30 p.m.
ABC	Fall	**Ugly Betty** (27/7.4) (Tied with ER and 24)		Grey's Anatomy (7/12.1)		**Six Degrees**	
ABC	Winter	**Ugly Betty** (27/7.4) (Tied with ER and 24)		Grey's Anatomy (7/12.1)		**Men in Trees**	
ABC	Spring	**Ugly Betty** (27/7.4) (Tied with ER and 24)		Grey's Anatomy (7/12.1)		**October Road**	
ABC	Summer	**Ugly Betty** (27/7.4) (Tied with ER and 24)		Grey's Anatomy (7/12.1)		**Men in Trees**	
CBS	Fall	Survivor: Cook Islands (18/8.8) (Tied with Criminal Minds)		CSI: Crime Scene Investigation (6/12.2)		**Shark** (20/8.8) (Tied with 60 Minutes)	
CBS	Winter	Criminal Minds (R)		CSI: Crime Scene Investigation (6/12.2)		**Shark** (20/8.8) (Tied with 60 Minutes)	
CBS	Late winter	Survivor: Fiji (18/8.8) (Tied with Criminal Minds)		CSI: Crime Scene Investigation (6/12.2)		**Shark** (20/8.8) (Tied with 60 Minutes)	
CBS	Spring	Survivor: Fiji (18/8.8) (Tied with Criminal Minds)		CSI: Crime Scene Investigation (6/12.2)		**Shark** (20/8.8) (Tied with 60 Minutes)	
CBS	Summer	**Pirate Master**		CSI: Crime Scene Investigation (6/12.2)		**Shark** (20/8.8) (Tied with 60 Minutes)	
CBS	Mid-summer	Big Brother		CSI: Crime Scene Investigation (6/12.2)		Without a Trace	
The CW		Smallville		Supernatural		Local programming	
Fox	Fall	**'Til Death**	**Happy Hour**	**Celebrity Duets**		Local programming	
Fox	Mid-fall	MLB Post Season / World Series					
Fox	Late fall	**'Til Death**	Family Guy (R)	The O.C.		Local programming	
Fox	Winter	**'Til Death**	The War at Home	The O.C.		Local programming	
Fox	Spring	American Idol (R)		**Are You Smarter than a 5th Grader?** (30/7.3) (Tied with **Brothers & Sisters** and The King of Queens)		Local programming	
Fox	Mid-spring	**Are You Smarter than a 5th Grader?** (30/7.3) (Tied with **Brothers & Sisters** and The King of Queens)		Family Guy (R)		Local programming	
Fox	Late spring	**Are You Smarter than a 5th Grader?** (30/7.3) (Tied with **Brothers & Sisters** and The King of Queens)		Trading Spouses: Meet Your New Mommy		Local programming	
Fox	Summer	**Are You Smarter than a 5th Grader?** (30/7.3) (Tied with **Brothers & Sisters** and The King of Queens)		So You Think You Can Dance		Local programming	
Fox	Mid-summer	**Are You Smarter than a 5th Grader?** (R)	**Don't Forget the Lyrics!**	So You Think You Can Dance		Local programming	
Fox	Late summer	**Don't Forget the Lyrics!**		So You Think You Can Dance		Local programming	
MNT	Fall	**Desire**		**Fashion House**		Local programming	
MNT	Winter	**Wicked Wicked Games**		**Watch Over Me**		Local programming	
MNT	Spring	My Thursday Night Movie				Local programming	
MNT	Summer	My Thursday Night Movie				Local programming	
NBC	Fall	My Name Is Earl	The Office	Deal or No Deal		ER (27/7.4) (Tied with Ugly Betty and 24)	
NBC	Winter	My Name Is Earl	The Office	Scrubs	**30 Rock**	ER (27/7.4) (Tied with Ugly Betty and 24)	
NBC	Spring	Encore programming		Scrubs	**Andy Barker, P.I.**	**Raines**	
NBC	Mid-spring	My Name Is Earl	The Office	**30 Rock**	Scrubs	ER (27/7.4) (Tied with Ugly Betty and 24)	
NBC	Summer	My Name Is Earl	30 Rock (R)	The Office (R)	Scrubs	**Studio 60 on the Sunset Strip**	
NBC	Mid-summer	My Name Is Earl	30 Rock (R)	The Office (R)	Scrubs	ER (R)	

NOTES: In May 2006, when ABC announced their fall lineup for the 2006-2007 TV season, Big Day and Notes from the Underbelly was scheduled to air at 8PM and 8:30PM ET. However, due to both shows not getting "buzz" before their fall premieres, ABC moved Ugly Betty from its planned Friday night 8PM slot to the Thursday night 8PM ET slot. Big Day and Notes from the Underbelly aired later on in the season on different nights.

Fast Cars and Superstars debuted June 7 on ABC as a lead-in to coverage of the 2007 NBA Finals.

== Friday ==
Network		8:00 p.m.	8:30 p.m.	9:00 p.m.	9:30 p.m.	10:00 p.m.	10:30 p.m.
ABC	Fall	Grey's Anatomy (R)		**Men in Trees**		20/20	
ABC	Winter	America's Funniest Home Videos (R)		20/20			
ABC	Mid-winter	Grey's Anatomy (R)		Desperate Housewives (R)		20/20	
ABC	Late winter	Grey's Anatomy (R)		20/20			
ABC	Early spring	Grey's Anatomy (R)		Wife Swap		20/20	
ABC	Spring	Grey's Anatomy (R)		**Six Degrees**		20/20	
ABC	Mid-spring	Grey's Anatomy (R)		Wife Swap		20/20	
ABC	Late spring	America's Funniest Home Videos (R)		**National Bingo Night**		20/20	
ABC	Summer	George Lopez (R)	According To Jim (R)	Kyle XY (R)		20/20	
ABC	Mid-summer	**Set for Life**		**Greek**		20/20	
ABC	Late summer	**Set for Life**		George Lopez (R)	According to Jim (R)	20/20	
CBS	Fall	Ghost Whisperer		Close to Home		Numbers	
CBS	Winter	Ghost Whisperer		Close to Home		Numbers	
CBS	Spring	Ghost Whisperer		Close to Home		Numbers	
CBS	Summer	Ghost Whisperer		**Jericho** (R)		Numbers	
The CW		WWE Friday Night SmackDown!				Local programming	
Fox	Fall	Nanny 911		Trading Spouses: Meet Your New Mommy		Local programming	
Fox	Late fall	**Vanished**		Trading Spouses: Meet Your New Mommy		Local programming	
Fox	Winter	**Justice**		Trading Spouses: Meet Your New Mommy		Local programming	
Fox	Mid-winter	Nanny 911		Trading Spouses: Meet Your New Mommy		Local programming	
Fox	Spring	House (R)		**The Wedding Bells**		Local programming	
Fox	Mid-spring	House (R)		Bones (R)		Local programming	
Fox	Summer	Bones (R)		**Standoff**		Local programming	
Fox	Late summer	Fox Friday Night Movie				Local programming	
MNT	Fall	**Desire**		**Fashion House**		Local programming	
MNT	Winter	**Wicked Wicked Games**		**Watch Over Me**		Local programming	
MNT	Spring	My Friday Night Movie				Local programming	
MNT	Summer	My Friday Night Movie				Local programming	
NBC	Fall	Deal or No Deal		Las Vegas		Law & Order	
NBC	Mid-fall	**1 vs. 100**		Las Vegas		Law & Order	
NBC	Spring	**Identity**		**Raines**		Law & Order	
NBC	Late spring	Dateline NBC				Law & Order	
NBC	Summer	**1 vs. 100**		Las Vegas (R)		Law & Order: Criminal Intent (R)	

NOTE: In May 2006, when ABC announced their fall lineup for the 2006-2007 TV season, Big Day and Notes from the Underbelly was scheduled to air at 8PM and 8:30PM ET for Thursday nights and Ugly Betty at 8PM ET Friday nights time slot. However, before their fall premieres, ABC moved Ugly Betty from its planned Friday night 8PM slot to the Thursday night 8PM ET slot. The Friday night 8PM time slot was filled with the previous night's episode of Grey's Anatomy until December.

== Saturday ==
Network		8:00 p.m.	8:30 p.m.	9:00 p.m.	9:30 p.m.	10:00 p.m.	10:30 p.m.
ABC	Fall	**ESPN Saturday Night Football** (continued to game completion)					
ABC	Winter	ABC Saturday Movie of the Week					
ABC	Spring	ABC Saturday Movie of the Week					
ABC	Summer	The Wonderful World of Disney					
ABC	Mid-summer	The Wonderful World of Disney				America's Funniest Home Videos (R)	
ABC	Late summer	ABC Saturday Movie of the Week				**Masters of Science Fiction**	
CBS		Crimetime Saturday				48 Hours	
Fox		COPS	COPS (R)	America's Most Wanted		Local programming	
MNT	Fall	**Desire**		**Fashion House**		Local programming	
MNT	Winter	**Wicked Wicked Games**		**Watch Over Me**		Local programming	
MNT	Mid-winter	My Saturday Night Movie				Local programming	
MNT	Spring	International Fight League				Local programming	
MNT	Summer	International Fight League				Local programming	
NBC	Fall	Dateline Saturday Night		Various programming		Law & Order: Special Victims Unit (R)	
NBC	Mid-fall	Dateline Saturday Night		**Kidnapped**		Law & Order: Special Victims Unit (R)	
NBC	Late fall	Dateline Saturday Night		Dateline Saturday Night		Law & Order: Special Victims Unit (R)	
NBC	Winter	Dateline Saturday Night		Various programming		Law & Order: Special Victims Unit (R)	
NBC	Late winter	Dateline Saturday Night		Law & Order: Special Victims Unit (R)		Law & Order: Criminal Intent (R)	
NBC	Spring	Dateline Saturday Night		Law & Order (R)		Law & Order: Criminal Intent (R)	
NBC	Mid-spring	Dateline Saturday Night		Law & Order: Special Victims Unit (R)		Law & Order (R)	
NBC	Summer	America's Got Talent (R)				Medium (R)	
NBC	Mid-summer	**The Singing Bee** (R)	America's Got Talent (R)			Medium (R)	

== By network ==
=== ABC ===
**Returning series**

- 20/20
- ABC Saturday Movie of the Week
- According to Jim
- America's Funniest Home Videos
- American Inventor
- The Bachelor
- Boston Legal
- Dancing with the Stars
- Desperate Housewives
- Extreme Makeover: Home Edition
- George Lopez
- Grey's Anatomy
- Lost
- Primetime
- Supernanny
- What About Brian
- Wife Swap
- The Wonderful World of Disney

**New series**

- **Big Day**
- **Brothers & Sisters**
- **Day Break** *
- **The Ex-Wives Club**
- **Fast Cars and Superstars** *
- **Fat March** *
- **The Great American Dream Vote** *
- **Help Me Help You**
- **i-Caught** *
- **In Case of Emergency** *
- **Just for Laughs** *
- **The Knights of Prosperity** *
- **Masters of Science Fiction** *
- **Men in Trees**
- **National Bingo Night** *
- **The Next Best Thing** *
- **The Nine**
- **Notes from the Underbelly** *
- **October Road** *
- **Saturday Night Football**
- **Set for Life** *
- **Shaq's Big Challenge** *
- **Show Me the Money** *
- **Six Degrees**
- **Traveler** *
- **Ugly Betty**

Not returning from 2005-06:

- ABC Thursday Night Movie
- Alias
- Commander in Chief
- Crumbs
- Emily's Reasons Why Not
- The Evidence
- Freddie
- Hope & Faith
- Hot Properties
- How to Get the Guy
- In Justice
- Invasion
- Jake in Progress
- Kyle XY
- Less than Perfect
- Master of Champions
- Miracle Workers
- Monday Night Football (moved to ESPN, returned to ABC in 2020-21)
- Night Stalker
- The One: Making a Music Star
- One Ocean View
- Rodney
- Sons & Daughters

=== CBS ===
**Returning series**

- 48 Hours
- 60 Minutes
- The Amazing Race
- Big Brother
- Close to Home
- Cold Case
- Criminal Minds
- CSI: Crime Scene Investigation
- CSI: Miami
- CSI: NY
- Ghost Whisperer
- How I Met Your Mother
- The King of Queens
- NCIS
- The New Adventures of Old Christine
- Numbers
- Survivor
- Two and a Half Men
- The Unit
- Without a Trace

**New series**

- **3 lbs** *
- **Armed and Famous** *
- **The Class**
- **Creature Comforts** *
- **Jericho**
- **Pirate Master** *
- **Power of 10** *
- **Rules of Engagement** *
- **Shark**
- **Smith**

Not returning from 2005-06:

- CBS Sunday Movie (returned and revived for 2019–20)
- Courting Alex
- Gameshow Marathon
- Love Monkey
- Out of Practice
- Still Standing
- Threshold
- Tuesday Night Book Club
- Yes, Dear

=== The CW ===
**Returning series**

- 7th Heaven (The WB)
- All of Us (UPN)
- America's Next Top Model (UPN)
- Beauty and the Geek (The WB)
- Everybody Hates Chris (UPN)
- Gilmore Girls (The WB)
- Girlfriends (UPN)
- One Tree Hill (The WB)
- Reba (The WB)
- Smallville (The WB)
- Supernatural (The WB)
- Veronica Mars (UPN)
- WWE SmackDown (UPN)

**New series**

- **The Game**
- **Hidden Palms** *
- **Pussycat Dolls Present: The Search for the Next Doll** *
- **Runaway**

Not returning from 2005–06:

- The Bedford Diaries (The WB)
- Blue Collar TV (The WB)
- Charmed (The WB)
- Cuts (UPN)
- Eve (UPN)
- Everwood (The WB)
- Get This Party Started (UPN)
- Half & Half (UPN)
- Just Legal (The WB)
- Living with Fran (The WB)
- Love, Inc. (UPN)
- Modern Men (The WB)
- One on One (UPN)
- Pepper Dennis (The WB)
- Related (The WB)
- Sex, Love & Secrets (UPN)
- South Beach (UPN)
- Survival of the Richest (The WB)
- Twins (The WB)
- What I Like About You (The WB)

=== Fox ===
**Returning series**

- 24
- America's Most Wanted
- American Dad!
- American Idol
- Bones
- Cops
- Family Guy
- Fox Friday Night Movie
- Hell's Kitchen
- House
- King of the Hill
- The Loop
- Nanny 911
- NFL on Fox
- The O.C.
- The OT
- Prison Break
- The Simpsons
- So You Think You Can Dance
- Trading Spouses
- The War at Home

**New series**

- **Anchorwoman** *
- **Are You Smarter than a 5th Grader?** *
- **Celebrity Duets**
- **Don't Forget the Lyrics!** *
- **Drive** *
- **Happy Hour**
- **Justice**
- **On the Lot** *
- **The Rich List**
- **Standoff**
- **'Til Death**
- **Vanished**
- **The Wedding Bells** *
- **The Winner** *

Not returning from 2005–06:

- Arrested Development (revived and returned in 2013 on Netflix)
- The Bernie Mac Show
- Free Ride
- Head Cases
- Killer Instinct
- Kitchen Confidential
- Malcolm in the Middle
- Reunion
- Skating with Celebrities
- Stacked
- That '70s Show
- Unan1mous

=== MyNetworkTV ===
New series
- **American Heiress**
- **Desire**
- **Fashion House**
- **International Fight League**
- **Saints & Sinners** *
- **Watch Over Me**
- **Wicked Wicked Games**

=== NBC ===
**Returning series**

- America's Got Talent
- The Apprentice
- The Biggest Loser
- The Contender
- Crossing Jordan
- Dateline NBC
- Deal or No Deal
- ER
- Las Vegas
- Last Comic Standing
- Law & Order
- Law & Order: Special Victims Unit
- Law & Order: Criminal Intent
- Medium
- Most Outrageous Moments
- My Name Is Earl
- NBC Sunday Night Football (Moved from ESPN)
- The Office
- Scrubs

**New series**

- **1 vs. 100**
- **30 Rock**
- **Age of Love** *
- **Andy Barker, P.I.** *
- **The Black Donnellys** *
- **Friday Night Lights**
- **Football Night In America**
- **Grease: You're the One That I Want!** *
- **Heroes**
- **Identity** *
- **Kidnapped**
- **Raines** *
- **The Real Wedding Crashers** *
- **The Singing Bee** *
- **Studio 60 on the Sunset Strip**
- **Thank God You're Here** *
- **Twenty Good Years**

Not returning from 2005–06:

- The Apprentice: Martha Stewart
- The Book of Daniel
- Celebrity Cooking Showdown
- Conviction
- E-Ring
- Fear Factor (revived and returned in 2011–12 for one season)
- Four Kings
- Heist
- Inconceivable
- Joey
- Law & Order: Trial By Jury
- Surface
- Teachers
- Thick & Thin
- Three Wishes
- Treasure Hunters
- The West Wing
- Will & Grace (revived and returned in 2017–18)
- Windfall

Note: The * indicates that the program was introduced in midseason.

== Pickups and cancellations ==
=== Full season pickups ===
==== ABC ====
- 20/20
- According to Jim
- America's Funniest Home Videos

==== CBS ====
- Jericho
- Shark
- Rules of Engagement

==== The CW ====
- The Game
- 7th Heaven
- One Tree Hill
- Veronica Mars

==== Fox ====
- 'Til Death
- Standoff

==== NBC ====
- Heroes
- Studio 60 on the Sunset Strip
- 30 Rock
- Friday Night Lights

=== Cancellations/series endings ===
==== ABC ====
- Big Day—Canceled after one season.
- The Nine—Canceled after one season.
- Help Me Help You—Canceled after one season.
- Day Break—Canceled after one season.
- Show Me the Money
- The Knights of Prosperity—Canceled after one season.
- The Great American Dream Vote
- Six Degrees—Canceled after one season.
- In Case of Emergency—Canceled after one season.
- What About Brian—Canceled after two seasons.
- George Lopez—Ended after six seasons.
- Traveler—Canceled after one season.

==== CBS ====
- Smith—Canceled on October 6, 2006, after three episodes. This was the first cancellation of the season.
- The King of Queens—Ended after nine seasons.
- Armed & Famous
- The Class—Canceled after one season.
- Close to Home—Canceled after two seasons.
- 3 lbs—Canceled after one season.
- Waterfront—Canceled before it aired.

==== Fox ====
- Happy Hour—Canceled after one season.
- The Rich List—Canceled after one episode.
- Vanished—Canceled after one season.
- Justice—Canceled after one season.
- The O.C.—Ended after four seasons.
- The Wedding Bells—Canceled after one season.
- Drive—Canceled after one season.
- Standoff—Canceled after one season.
- The Winner—Canceled after one season.
- The War at Home—Canceled after two seasons.

==== NBC ====
- Kidnapped—Canceled after one season.
- Law & Order: Criminal Intent—The show moved from NBC to USA Network.
- Twenty Good Years—Canceled after one season.
- The Black Donnellys—Canceled after one season.
- Andy Barker, P.I.—Canceled after one season.
- The Real Wedding Crashers
- Crossing Jordan—Ended after six seasons.
- Studio 60 on the Sunset Strip—Canceled after one season.
- Thank God You're Here
- Raines—Canceled after one season.
- Identity
- Grease: You're the One That I Want!
- The Singles Table—Canceled before it aired.

==== The CW ====
- Runaway—Canceled after one season.
- Reba—Ended after six seasons.
- 7th Heaven—Ended after eleven seasons.
- Gilmore Girls—Ended after seven seasons.
- Hidden Palms—Canceled after one season.
- Veronica Mars—Ended after three seasons.
- All of Us—Ended after four seasons.

==== MyNetworkTV ====
- Desire
- Fashion House
- Wicked Wicked Games
- Watch Over Me
- American Heiress
- Saints & Sinners
