= Mesa para tres =

- Genre: Telenovela
- Written by: Jorge Hiller, Claudia F. Sánchez, Rafael Rojas
- Directed by: Armando Barbosa, Luis Orjuela
- Starring: Héctor Arredondo; Diego Cadavid; Catalina Aristizábal
- Country of origin: Colombia
- Original language: Spanish
- No. of episodes: 118

Production
- Executive producer: Orlando Jiménez
- Producers: Asier Aguilar, Miguel Ángel Daza
- Production location: Bogotá
- Camera setup: Multicamera
- Running time: 45 minutes

Original release
- Network: Caracol TV
- Release: March 15 – December 15, 2004

Mesa para tres ("Table for Three") is a 2004 Colombian telenovela produced and broadcast by Caracol TV.

== Plot ==
Luis and Alejandro Toro arrive with their mother to Bogotá, after escaping their home town, where they owned a restaurant. In Bogotá they get a job at Zavatti, a high-class restaurant. Both Luis and Alejandro meet and fall in love with Andrea Zavatti, who is the daughter of Harold Zavatti, the owner of the restaurant. George Brown, who is Andrea's boyfriend, tries to get rid from the Toro brothers, as he is only interested in Mr Zavatti's fortune. Luis is kidnapped and thought dead, Andrea and Alejandro get together and, when Luis appears again, feels betrayed by Alejandro.

== Cast ==
- Héctor Arredondo as Luis Toro
- Diego Cadavid as Alejandro Alejo Toro
- Catalina Aristizábal as Andrea Zavatti
- Daniel Ochoa as George Brown
- Mayte Vilan as Blanca Patricia Melo
- Myriam de Lourdes as Rita
- Clemencia Guillén as Tía Martha
- Patricia Grisales as Leonor Torres "Leito"
- Álvaro Rodríguez as Francisco Paco
- Luis Fernando Múnera as Justo Gamarra
- Yuli Ferreira as Violeta Gamarra
- Sandra Guzmán as Marta Consuelo Sandoval
- Anderson Balsero as Lalo
- Germán Quintero as Harold Zavatti
- María Cristi Gálvez as Victoria Stevens de Brown
- Estefanía Borge as Kathy Noguera
- Álvaro Bayona as Teniente Abril
- Astrid Junguito as Fidelina Torres
- Manolo Orjuela as Farfán
- Orlando Valenzuela as Ramón Tavernero
- Carlos Hurtado as Guillermo Flórez
- Santiago More as Gerardo Pinzón
- Valentina Rendón as Claudia
- Tania Fálquez as Tte. Ángela Barrera
- Daniel Rocha as Carmelo Sepúlveda
- Andrés Toro as Andrés
- Genoveva Caro as Martha
- Felipe Noguera as Daniel

== Theme song ==
The song used as theme song was the 1981 hit Te quiero para mí, by Spanish group Trigo Limpio.

== International broadcasting ==
The series was sold to several networks in Latin America, including Venezuela's RCTV. In 2007, ClubIT Arena bought the rights to offer a subtitled version of Mesa para tres on its website in Japan, under the title Andrea, ai to ryakudatsu no honoo (アンドレア〜愛と略奪の炎). It was divided in 4 "seasons" (3 of 30 episodes each, and one of 28 episodes).

=== MyNetworkTV telenovelas ===
Mesa para tres was the basis for the 2006 MyNetworkTV telenovela Desire. Changes were made in the location and the plot to make them more palatable to Americans. The serial was known as Table for Three and Three's a Crowd before its debut. The show was filmed at Stu Segall Productions in San Diego, using 25 principal actors, 250 supporting actors and about 2,000 extras. Ratings for Desire fell below expectations. The debut scored a 2.0 rating and the first week averaged an 0.8 rating and 1 share. It averaged a 0.4 rating in the adult 18-49 demographic., falling to a 0.3 in its second week. However, the show was sold to several international markets.
