= Saints & Sinners (2007 TV series) =

2007 telenovela on MyNetworkTV

- Country of origin: United States
- Original language: English
- No. of episodes: 65 (39 unaired)

Production
- Production location: San Diego, California
- Production company: 20th Century Fox Television

Original release
- Network: MyNetworkTV
- Release: March 14 – July 18, 2007

Saints & Sinners is a telenovela which premiered on March 14, 2007 at 8 p.m. ET/7 p.m. CT on the American television network MyNetworkTV. Twentieth Television produced this limited-run serial, based on the 2000 TV Azteca telenovela titled La Calle de las Novias (Brides’ Avenue). Two hour installments aired on Wednesday evenings through April, when the show moved to a one-hour slot on Wednesdays at 9 p.m.

The network dropped the serial from its time after the July 18, 2007 broadcast. Most episodes were left unaired in the U.S.

All 65 episodes aired overseas, and as of 2021, the entire series can now be seen on TubiTV.

== Story ==
This modern-day Romeo-and-Juliet story revolves around two Miami Beach families – the Capshaws and the Martins – who are plagued by a long, bitter rivalry. Julia Capshaw (Tyler Kain) falls is in love with Roman Martin (Scott Bailey), the man accused of killing her father. They find themselves caught between their feuding hotel-owner families, who will stop at nothing to succeed. Meanwhile, a handsome stranger who works for the DEA poses as a priest Marcus Pitt. But a darker force is at work. A powerful drug-running kingpin nicknamed "The Guerrero", has not only murdered Julia Capshaw's father Howard, but is on the loose and killing more people every day. The climax of the series features Julia and Roman finally reuniting just in time to unmask the Guerrero, who turns out to be Roman's mother, Diana Martin.

Mel Harris plays Sylvia Capshaw, Julia's mother. María Conchita Alonso and Charles Shaughnessy play Roman's parents, Diana (who was secretly "the Guerrero" and made Bo Derek's character from Fashion House, Maria Gianni, look like a saint) and August Martin. Natalie Martinez plays their daughter, Pilar Martin. Robin Givens plays Kelly Dodd, a New York City fashion designer who develops a crush on Roman. Michael Duvert and Joe Tabb are also in the cast.

Initially, the Capshaw and the Martin clans were named the Oliveras and the Mazzonis. In the Mexican original, they were the Sánchez and Mendoza families. Joe Tabb played Marco Manetti on another MyNetworkTV telenovela, Desire, while Natalie Martinez portrayed Michelle Miller on MyNetworkTV's Fashion House.

== Development ==
The limited-run serial was originally intended to run in syndication as A Dangerous Love under the "Secret Obsessions" umbrella title. Next, MyNetworkTV planned to air 65 one-hour episodes on weekdays with a Saturday night recap. Then the network, facing low ratings, decided to cut back on telenovelas and cancel them.

Initially, new episodes ran on Wednesday nights as a two-hour block, then were cut to one hour per week. While MyNetworkTV stopped development on future telenovelas, Saints and Sinners had already finished shooting before the decision was announced. This show's final broadcast marks the end of the new network's experiment with serialized dramas.

While the show is set in Florida, it was filmed at Stu Segall Productions in San Diego, except for a few exterior shots. The MyNetworkTV Web site lists the show as "part of the Secret Obsessions series." About 75 minutes of program was stretched to fill each two-hour weekly timeslot.

MyNetworkTV announced plans to run this show and American Heiress once per week until October, when the remaining episodes will appear online. MyNetworkTV President Greg Meidel previously said the network would air the complete runs of both shows. However, the network unceremoniously yanked both telenovelas after the July 18, 2007 broadcast. Only 26 out of 65 hours aired.

In America, Saints & Sinners reran on Dish Network's now-defunct Voom HD channel UltraHD, along with reruns of Fashion House.

The complete series was aired in Australia, on the Seven Network, from 3-4pm weekdays and also on Foxtel's W channel on Saturday mornings .

== See also ==
- MyNetworkTV telenovelas
