= Friends with Benefits =

Friends with benefits is a sexual arrangement between friends that involves recurrent physical intimacy and varies in its formation, outcomes, and attributes.

Friends with Benefits may refer to:

== Film and television ==
- Friends with Benefits (film), a 2011 film directed by Will Gluck
- Friends with Benefits (telenovela), a telenovela planned for 2007 but canceled
- Friends with Benefits (TV series), a 2011 American television sitcom
- Friends (With Benefits), a 2009 independent comedy-drama film
- "Friends with Benefits", an episode of the telenova Fashion House
- Friends with Benefits, the working title of the film No Strings Attached

== Music ==
- "Friends with Benefits" (song), a 2016 song by KSI and MNDM from the extended play Jump Around
- Friends with Benefit, a 2006 CD soundtrack from the TV series One Tree Hill

== See also ==
- "Friend with Benefit", an episode of the animated television series The Simpsons
- "Friends Without Benefits", an episode of the animated comedy series Family Guy
