= Michelle Belegrin =

American actress and model

- Occupations: Television, film actress

Michelle Belegrin is an American actress and model, who starred as Andrea Zavatti on the MyNetworkTV serial Desire. She has also modeled, standing at 5 feet 7½ inches tall, for Marie Claire, ELLE and Fashion Quarterly. She appeared in the 2009 direct-to-video film, Blood and Bone, starring Michael Jai White.

== Personal ==
Belegrin has lived all over California from Sacramento to Los Angeles. She obtained a degree from the University of California Santa Barbara.

== Appearances ==
At the start of her career, Belegrin did several commercials for Honda, Panasonic and Bally's Total Fitness. She has appeared in many television series and movies, including CSI: Miami, CSI: Crime Scene Investigation, Kitchen Confidential, Fistful of Diamonds, Project Solitude, Potheads: The Movie, Red 71 and Blood and Bone.
