= Top-rated United States television programs of 2006–07 =

This table displays the top-rated primetime television series of the 2006–07 season as measured by Nielsen Media Research.

Rank	Program	Network	Rating
1	American Idol — Wednesday	FOX	17.3
2	American Idol — Tuesday	FOX	16.8
3	Dancing with the Stars — Monday	ABC	12.7
3	Dancing with the Stars — Tuesday	ABC	12.7
3	Dancing with the Stars — Wednesday	ABC	12.7
6	CSI: Crime Scene Investigation	CBS	12.2
7	Grey's Anatomy	ABC	12.1
8	House	FOX	11.1
9	Desperate Housewives	ABC	10.8
10	CSI: Miami	CBS	10.7
11	Sunday Night Football	NBC	10.5
12	Without a Trace	CBS	9.4
13	Deal or No Deal — Monday	NBC	9.2
14	Two and a Half Men	CBS	9.1
15	NCIS	CBS	9.0
16	CSI: NY	CBS	8.9
16	Cold Case	CBS	8.9
18	Criminal Minds	CBS	8.8
18	Survivor	CBS	8.8
20	60 Minutes	CBS	8.7
20	Shark	CBS	8.7
22	Lost	ABC	8.3
23	Heroes	NBC	8.0
24	Law & Order: Special Victims Unit	NBC	7.9
25	Rules of Engagement	CBS	7.8
26	Extreme Makeover: Home Edition	ABC	7.7
27	Ugly Betty	ABC	7.4
27	ER	NBC	7.4
27	24	FOX	7.4
30	Brothers & Sisters	ABC	7.3
30	The King of Queens	CBS	7.3
30	Are You Smarter than a 5th Grader?	FOX	7.3
