= Alicia Leigh Willis =

American actress (born 1978)

- Born: March 1, 1978 (age 47); Atlanta, Georgia, U.S.
- Occupation: Actress
- Years active: 1996–present

Alicia Leigh Willis (born March 1, 1978) is an American actress. She is known for her roles in soap operas.

== Personal life ==
Alicia was born in Atlanta, Georgia. She is one of four children. Sisters Kimberly and Tiffany, and brother Ryan. Her father is actor David E. Willis and her mother is Leigh Willis. Alicia currently resides in Aliso Viejo, California.

== Career ==
She portrayed Alli Fowler on the NBC soap opera Another World from 1998 to 1999. From December 2001 to February 2006, Willis played Courtney Matthews on the ABC soap opera, General Hospital. She was nominated for two Daytime Emmy awards for her work on GH.

Willis also had a recurring role as Corey Conway on the WB Network series 7th Heaven. In October 2006, Willis guest starred on CSI: Miami. She starred as Elizabeth, the title role of the 2007 MyNetworkTV telenovela American Heiress.

== Filmography ==
=== Film ===
| Year | Title | Role | Notes |
|---|---|---|---|
| 2010 | The Terror Experiment | Mandy | |
| 2010 | Raven | Sandra | |
| 2011 | Julia X | Jessica | |
| 2015 | Dangerous Company | Pauline Mitchell | |
| 2017 | The Student | Abigail Grandacre | |
| 2018 | Baby Obsession | Raquel | |
| 2019 | Chameleon | Rebecca | |
| 2022 | Catfish Killer | Marianne | |

=== Television ===
| Year | Title | Role | Notes |
|---|---|---|---|
| 1996–2000, 2002 | 7th Heaven | Corey Conway | Recurring role (seasons 1–4), guest (season 6) |
| 1997 | Saved by the Bell: The New Class | Leslie | Episode: "Suddenly Ryan" |
| 1998 | Grace Under Fire | Laurie | Episode: "Grace Under Class" |
| 1998 | Something So Right | Jennifer Hadley | Episode: "Something About Egg on Your Farce" |
| 1998 | Maggie Winters | Tiffany | Episode: "And Those Who Can't" |
| 1998 | USA High | Renee | Episode: "Hands Off My Christian" |
| 1999 | Another World | Alexandra Fowler | 3 episodes |
| 2000 | Chicken Soup for the Soul | Alyssa Peterson | Episode: "A Bad Influence" |
| 2001–2006, 2015, 2020 | General Hospital | Courtney Matthews | Regular role |
| 2002 | The Chronicle | Alexis Carson | Episode: "The Stepford Cheerleaders" |
| 2004 | Greg the Bunny | Amy | Episode: "Jimmy Drives Gil Crazy" |
| 2006 | CSI: Miami | Anna | Episode: "High Octane" |
| 2007 | American Heiress | Elizabeth Wakefield | Main role |
| 2008 | The L Word | Cindi Tucker | Recurring role (season 5) |
| 2009 | Without a Trace | Robin | Episode: "Undertow" |
| 2010–2019 | The Bay | Avery Garrett | Regular role |
| 2019 | Mommy's Little Princess | Julianna Mathis | TV film |
| 2019 | Evil Touch | Special Agent Reynolds | Episode: "1.1" |
