= Watch Over Me =

American television series

- Title screenshot
- Created by: Gustavo Belatti; Mario Segade
- Starring: Dayanara Torres; Todd Cahoon; Marc Menard
- Opening theme: Transcenders
- Country of origin: United States
- Original language: English
- No. of episodes: 66

Production
- Production locations: San Diego, California
- Running time: 45 minutes
- Production company: 20th Century Fox Television

Original release
- Network: MyNetworkTV
- Release: December 6, 2006 – March 6, 2007

Related
- Resistiré; Amar sin límites

Watch Over Me is an American television series that debuted on December 6, 2006, on MyNetworkTV. Twentieth Television produced 66 episodes to air weekdays. The limited-run serial is an adaptation of Argentine series Resistiré.

Dayanara Torres, a former Miss Universe, played a woman torn between her bioterrorist fiancé (Marc Menard) and her bodyguard, played by Todd Cahoon. Catherine Oxenberg and Casper Van Dien also appeared as villains.

Telefe, which produced the original version, syndicates a 64-episode run of the series in Europe, the Middle East, and Asia. It promoted the show as mixing a classic Latin genre with Hollywood aesthetics. From July 2009, it was aired in Slovakia on TV Markíza, taking the slot of Latin American telenovelas, but the show was not very successful.

As of 2021, it is available for streaming on TubiTV.

== Production notes ==
- Watch Over Me was first intended to run as A Dangerous Love under the Secret Obsessions umbrella title. A Secret Obsessions logo appeared in the show's opening credits—and the MyNetworkTV website said that the serial was "part of the Secret Obsessions series."
- MyNetworkTV had a special promotional deal with Wal-Mart, which provided wardrobe for the cast from the Metro 7 women's line. Dayanara Torres had previously modeled for the brand.
- The theme song was performed by The Transcenders.
- The house used as Michael Krieger's compound is located in Rancho Santa Fe, California. Most scenes were filmed at Stu Segall Productions in San Diego.
- Recap shows originally aired on Saturdays, but were replaced by movies on February 3, 2007.
- Mexico's Televisa commissioned its own version of this story in 2006, titled Amar sin límites ("Love Without Limits"). Univision is expected to air this 135-episode serial in the USA this fall. The Jack and Julia characters are named Diego Moran and Azul Toscano, while the villain is named Mauricio Duarte.
- Clive Robertson turned down a role in this series, calling the part "a waste of time". He later accepted the male lead on Wicked Wicked Games.
- Alex Thomas, a main character on Desire, appears in this series. Actor Zack Silva, shown using footage from the previous MyNetworkTV telenovela, was uncredited.
- Catherine Oxenberg and Casper Van Dien were married in real life and have two children.

== Cast ==
Actor	Role
Dayanara Torres	Julia Rivera
Todd Cahoon	Jack Porter
Marc Menard	Michael Krieger
Casper Van Dien	Andre Forester
Catherine Oxenberg	Leandra Thames
Roxana Zal	Natalie Weller
Catalina Rodriguez	Sasha Hansu
Dan Wells	Eric Simpson
Omar Avila	Ryan Rivera
Tony Castillo	Dr. Alfred Rivera
Jaimie Alexander	Caitlin Porter
Sidney Franklin	Nicholas
Jon Prescott	Pete Weber
Caitlin McCarthy	Caroline Krieger
Alexandra Wescourt	Dr. Christine Baden
Bailey Chase	Steve Hughes
Lisa Ann Walter	Mabel
Greg Watanabe	Isaac
Lanisha Cole	Melanie
