= List of Desire episodes =

The following is an episode list for MyNetworkTV's television series Desire. The series began on September 5, 2006, and finished on December 5, 2006.

The show originally aired Monday through Friday at 8:00 p.m. with a highlights episode airing every Saturday night at 8:00 p.m..

There were a total of 65 episodes of Desire aired.

The list is ordered by the episodes' original air dates. The show used many flashbacks and reused much footage.

== Episodes ==
No.	Title	Original release date
1	"Table for Three"	September 5, 2006
2	"Thrill of the Hunt"	September 6, 2006
3	"Tasting"	September 7, 2006
4	"Stealing the Show"	September 8, 2006
5	"Sugar and Spice"	September 11, 2006
6	"Accidents Happen"	September 12, 2006
7	"The Hot Moves"	September 13, 2006
8	"Secrets Revealed"	September 14, 2006
9	"Pretty Poison"	September 15, 2006
10	"True Confessions"	September 18, 2006
11	"Turning a Blind Eye"	September 19, 2006
12	"Farwell"	September 20, 2006
13	"Out of the Blue"	September 21, 2006
14	"Burn, Baby, Burn"	September 22, 2006
15	"Salvation of One"	September 25, 2006
16	"Ashes to Ashes"	September 26, 2006
17	"Global Recap No. 1"	September 27, 2006
18	"What Is Past Is Prologue"	September 28, 2006
19	"Louis' Story"	September 29, 2006
20	"A Needle in a Haystack"	October 2, 2006
21	"If Only"	October 3, 2006
22	"The Fortunes"	October 4, 2006
23	"A Star Is Born"	October 5, 2006
24	"Andrea's Story"	October 6, 2006
25	"Here Comes the Bride"	October 10, 2006
26	"Fresh Wounds"	October 11, 2006
27	"War"	October 12, 2006
28	"Loyalty"	October 13, 2006
29	"Keep the Home Fire Burning"	October 16, 2006
30	"Resurrection"	October 17, 2006
31	"A Case of Nothing"	October 18, 2006
32	"Estranged"	October 19, 2006
33	"Axes of Evil"	October 20, 2006
34	"The Auction House Rules"	October 23, 2006
35	"Revenge Served Cold"	October 24, 2006
36	"The Root of All Evil"	October 26, 2006
37	"George's Story"	October 27, 2006
38	"Firewire"	October 30, 2006
39	"Getting Served"	October 31, 2006
40	"Red Scare"	October 31, 2006
41	"Closed Doors"	November 1, 2006
42	"Under New Management"	November 2, 2006
43	"Cara's Story"	November 3, 2006
44	"Bad Connections"	November 6, 2006
45	"Keys to the Kingdom"	November 7, 2006
46	"Checkmate"	November 8, 2006
47	"Worlds Collide"	November 9, 2006
48	"Rita's Story"	November 10, 2006
49	"Seal It with a Kiss"	November 13, 2006
50	"The Gauntlet"	November 14, 2006
51	"May the Best Chef Win"	November 15, 2006
Alex challenged Louis and Christoph to a cook-off with the stipulation that the loser's restaurant be shut down for good, and despite some underhand tricks pulled by Christoph during the competition Alex came out on top and Louis's restaurant was shut down. Suzy started to turn Louis and Culley against each other. Louis and Alex's mother was kidnapped.
52	"Last Man Standing"	November 16, 2006
53	"The Prisoner's Dream"	November 17, 2006
54	"Search & Destroy"	November 20, 2006
55	"Alex's Story"	November 21, 2006
57	"Last Goodbye"	November 23, 2006
58	"The Son from the Shadows"	November 24, 2006
59	"Mending Wall"	November 27, 2006
60	"Running Scared"	November 28, 2006
61	"You Can't Go Home Again"	November 29, 2006
62	"Unforgivable"	November 30, 2006
63	"Flash Point"	December 1, 2006
64	"Brothers"	December 4, 2006
65	"At the Water's Edge"	December 5, 2006
