= Eliana Alexander =

Mexican actress

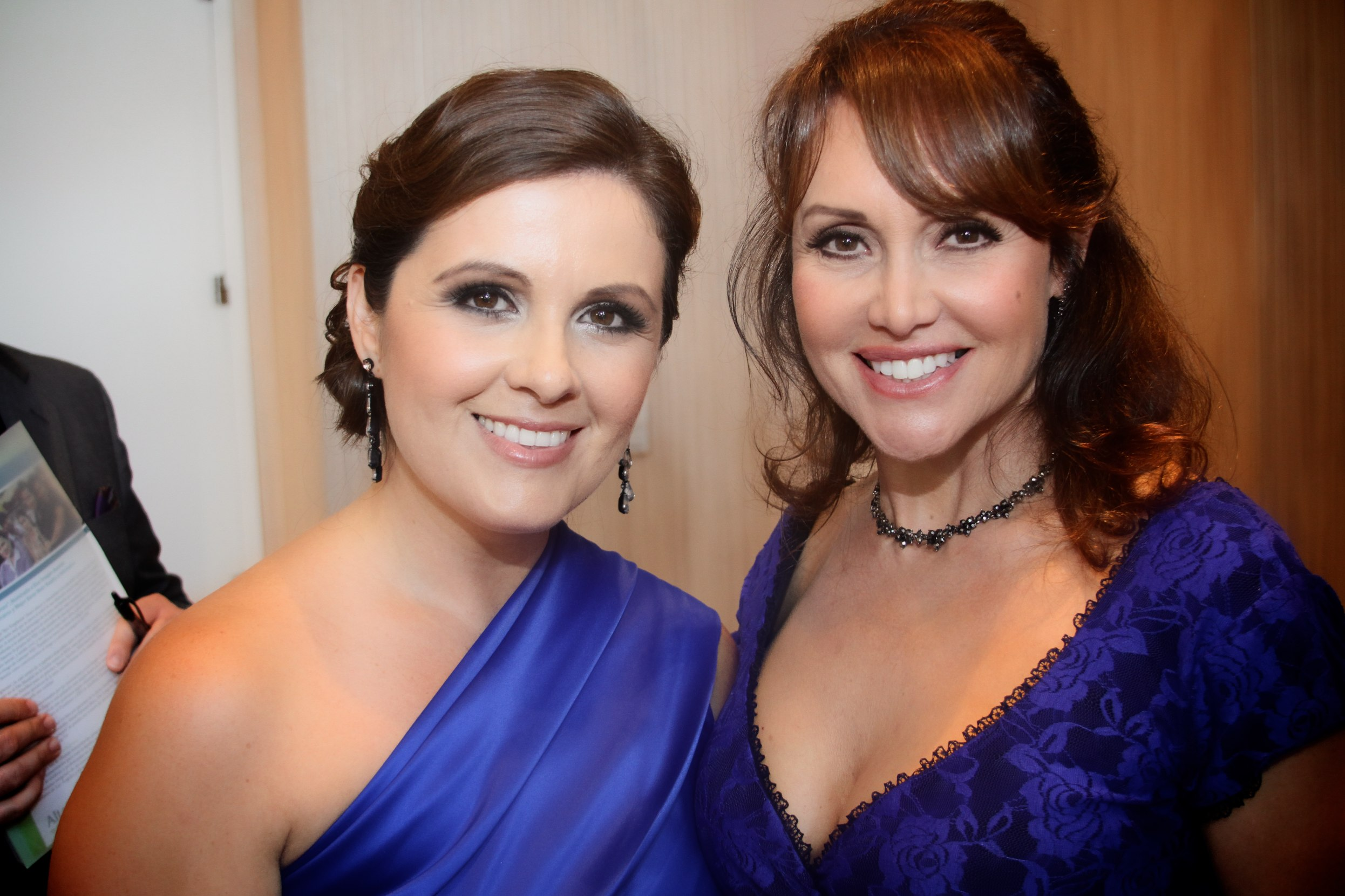
- Alexander (right) with Hilda Sandoval at the 2013 Imagen Foundation Awards
- Born: Mexico City, Mexico
- Other name: Eliana H. Alexander

Eliana Alexander is a Mexican actress. She portrayed the role of Rita Thomas on My Network TV's Desire.

== Filmography ==
- Agenda (2007) .... Magdalena Linney
- Desire (2006) .... Rita Thomas
- Madam Marina (2005) .... Marina
- Ley del silencio, La (2005) (mini) TV Series .... Amparo
- How the Garcia Girls Spent Their Summer (2005) .... Nora
- All God's Creatures (2002) .... Stenographer
- Llorona del río, La (2001) .... Lupita
- A Family in Crisis: The Elian Gonzales Story (2000) .... Delores
- The Bold and the Beautiful .... (1999) Suzie
- Beverly Hills, 90210 (1999) .... Maria Alvarez
- Mad TV (1999) .... Maria
- Ángeles (1999) .... Patricia
- Kiss of a Stranger (1999) .... Angela
- My Father's Love (1999) .... Maria's Mother
- Second Skin (1998) .... Jolie
- Foto Novelas: Mangas (1997) .... Sister Maria
- Mr. Rhodes .... Cleaning Lady (1996)
- A Moment of Truth (1996) .... Joey
- The O.J. Simpson Story (1995) .... Young Woman
- The Rockford Files: I Still Love L.A. (1994) .... Officer #1
- Mi Vida Loca (1993) .... Mousie's Mother
- Perfect Strangers .... (1991) Balki B. Flygirl
- Far Out Man (1990) (uncredited) .... Dancer and Nurse
- It's Garry Shandling's Show (1988) .... Bridesmaid
