= Al Bandiero =

American actor

- Born: Alphonse Bandiero; Brooklyn, New York, U.S.
- Occupations: Film, television actor, Radio personality
- Website: http://albandiero.net/

Al Bandiero is an American film, radio personality, and television actor, known for playing Peter Evans in the television series Desire.

== Other works ==
- Extensive TV Hosting; Children's Miracle Network Telethon, TV 2000, This Week's Music, Music Connection, also numerous infomercials.
- Extensive National Radio Shows; Al's Party, Incredible 80s, DJ at WKBW in the late 1970s and WKTU in 1980s.
- Direct Hits, Club Hotline (Japan)
- Extensive Voice over credits; Car companies, Hair shampoos, Soft drinks, Pop Albums, TV promos, etc.
- Silent Hill: Homecoming (video-game) 4 characters (mo-cap & voices)

== Publicity ==
Interviews

- Southeastern Antiquing & Collecting Magazine (USA) January 2007, by: Ken Hall, "Al Bandiero, Star of the Fox TV Series Desire, Collects Watches"
- Radio & Records (USA) 28 July 2006, Iss. 1668, pg. 28, by: Darnella Dunham, "Going Hollywood, From Radio Personality to Actor"
- Starry Constellation Magazine (USA) 2006, by: Lisa Steinberg, "Al Bandiero, Desire"

Pictorial

- Fitness + (USA) October 2000, pg. 84-87, by: Steve Raimondi, "The man behind the voice"

== Filmography ==
- Desire (2006) (TV series) - Peter Evans (65 episodes)
- The Confession (2005) - Prison Guard
- I Am Stamos (2004) - Agent
- The Practice (2003) (TV series) - Police Officer (1 episode)
- Dragnet (2003) (TV series) - Reporter No. 1 (1 episode)
- Mister Sterling (????) (TV series) - Maitre'D (1 episode)
- Girls Behaving Badly (????) (TV series) - Mob Husband (1 episode)
- Scene of the Crime (2002) (TV) - Det. Jimm Redmond
- Rocky IV (1985) - American Commentator #2
