= Blood and Bone =

2009 film by Ben Ramsey

- DVD cover
- Directed by: Ben Ramsey
- Screenplay by: Michael Andrews
- Produced by: Nick Simunek; Matthew Binns; Michael Mailer
- Starring: Michael Jai White; Julian Sands; Eamonn Walker; Dante Basco; Nona Gaye; Michelle Belegrin; Bob Sapp
- Cinematography: Roy H. Wagner
- Edited by: Dean Goodhill
- Music by: Nicholas Pike
- Production companies: Remarkable Films; Michael Mailer Films
- Distributed by: Sony Pictures Home Entertainment
- Release date: September 15, 2009
- Running time: 90 minutes
- Country: United States
- Language: English

Blood and Bone is a 2009 American martial arts film directed by Ben Ramsey and written by Michael Andrews. It stars Michael Jai White, Julian Sands, Eamonn Walker, Dante Basco, Nona Gaye, Michelle Belegrin, and Bob Sapp. The film also features martial artist Matt Mullins, former professional wrestler Ernest "The Cat" Miller, Kimbo Slice, Maurice Smith, and Gina Carano.

It was released direct-to-DVD on September 15, 2009.

== Plot ==
Martial artist, former marine, ex-con Isaiah Bone rents a room in a Los Angeles boardinghouse owned by Tamara. One night, after watching an underground fight involving local champion Hammerman, Bone makes a deal with promoter Pinball to get him into the fight scene for 20% of his earnings; 40% if Pinball puts his own money on the line. Bone wins his first underground fight with only two kicks. On that same night, Bone meets mob boss James and his girlfriend Angela Soto. Pinball explains that James set up Angela's husband, Danny, on a triple homicide, sending him to jail. Since then, Angela has fallen into drug addiction.

Over the next few nights, Bone defeats every fighter in his path, earning himself and Pinball thousands in cash. At the same time, he bonds with Tamara, her young adopted son Jared, and an elderly man named Roberto. After beating the undefeated Hammerman, James offers Bone a deal. The international underground fighting scene is run by a black market arms dealer named Franklin McVeigh, and James wants Bone to square off against Pretty Boy Price, the reigning champion. After telling James he will consider the offer, Bone reveals to Angela that Danny was his cellmate and friend. One day, Danny was murdered by another inmate. Angela reveals that shortly after Danny went to prison, she gave birth to a son, but lost custody of him, and does not know if he is still alive. Bone promises to bring her to her son, but he sends her to a drug rehab clinic until she is ready.

The next morning, James offers McVeigh $5,000,000 to approve and schedule a fight between Bone and Price. James soon sends his pit bulls to maul and kill Roberto after Roberto witnesses James running over a woman. The news of Roberto's death devastates Tamara, and when she and Bone fall asleep together, they awake to see James in their room with Jared. Originally, Bone refuses to fight Price, but when James threatens to have Angela, Tamara, Jared, and Pinball killed, he soon obliges. Bone secretly records James' revelation that he had Danny set up and murdered, which he transmits to Pinball's cell phone; Pinball then sends the video to the authorities. Bone faces Price while at the same time James sends Hammerman and Teddy D to kill everyone associated with Bone, but they are in turn killed by Pinball in Angela's drug rehab clinic due to a setup by Bone, who anticipated James's next move. The fight between Bone and Price looks to be in Bone's favor until he purposefully taps out at the last second to give Price the win. James grabs his katana and attacks Bone, but Bone is thrown a jian by McVeigh's bodyguard O'Hara to even the odds. Bone beats James with the sheath instead and, in the process, severs one of James's hands. He runs off before the police arrive to arrest James and shut down the fight club.

The next day, Angela is reunited with her long-lost son. Before getting on his way, Bone leaves Tamara an envelope full of cash and asks her to take Angela in once she is rehabilitated. He also parts ways with Pinball, saying he has business to attend to.

In a post-credit scene, it is revealed that James is in prison and was assaulted and raped by the inmates, likely orchestrated by McVeigh.

== Cast ==
- Michael Jai White as Isaiah Bone, an ex-convict and highly skilled martial artist who enters the underground fighting scene
- Julian Sands as Franklin McVeigh, a black market arms dealer who runs the international underground fighting scene
- Eamonn Walker as James, a local mob leader
- Dante Basco as Pinball, a local fight promoter
- Nona Gaye as Tamara, the landlady of the Bone's apartment
- Michelle Belegrin as Angela Soto, Danny's wife and Jared's mother
- Bob Sapp as Hammer Man, James' top fighter
- Dick Anthony Williams as Roberto, an elderly man who is Bone's neighbor
- Francis Capra as Tattoo
- Ron Yuan as Teddy D, James' bodyguard
- Kimbo Slice as JC, an inmate
- Gina Carano as Veretta
- Maurice Smith as Fasthands, an underground fighter
- Ernest "The Cat" Miller as Mommie Dearest, an underground fighter
- Matt Mullins as Pretty Boy Price, McVeigh's top fighter
- Kevin Phillips as Danny, Angela's husband, and Jared's father
- Tanoai Reed as Gold Tooth
- Louie Torrellas as Kevin

Additionally, Gene LeBell has a non-speaking part of an attendant, while Robert Wall plays O'Hara.
