= Stu Segall =

American actor

Stu Segall is a Boston area–born TV and movie producer and director who is the founder of Stu Segall Productions, a San Diego–based TV production studio.

Segall began his career in 1970, directing sexploitation movies and hard-core pornography, including the famous Insatiable, starring Marilyn Chambers. Eventually, he got work in television. In 1984, Stephen J. Cannell tapped him to produce the TV series Hunter. He opened his San Diego TV studio to film the TV show Silk Stalkings in 1991.

In addition to TV production, his studio also offers hyper-realistic training for military personnel. The company this training is conducted under is Strategic Operations.

== See also ==
- Golden Age of Porn
