= American Heiress =

- Starring: Alicia Leigh Willis
- Country of origin: United States
- Original language: English
- No. of seasons: 1
- No. of episodes: 65 (39 unaired)

Production
- Production locations: San Diego, California
- Production company: 20th Century Fox Television

Original release
- Network: MyNetworkTV
- Release: March 13 – July 18, 2007

American Heiress is a telenovela which debuted on March 13, 2007 at 8 p.m. ET/7 p.m. CT on the American television network MyNetworkTV. This romantic melodrama tells the story of a roughneck pilot and a pampered heiress who survive a plane crash. The show was produced by Twentieth Television, based on the 2004 TV Azteca series La Heredera ("The Heiress").

Heiress was the last series produced for MyNetworkTV's original all-telenovela format. When the network dropped the serial after the July 18, 2007 broadcast, most episodes were left unaired. All 65 episodes aired overseas, and as of 2021 are available to stream on Tubi.

== Story ==
This limited-run serial follows the title character, Elizabeth Wakefield, played by Alicia Leigh Willis, from steamy rain forests to the high-stakes business world. After a terrifying crash in the family jet, the heiress falls in love with a fellow survivor, a hard-edged former Air Force pilot named JD Bruce (Carter MacIntyre).

The new couple then must struggle to survive in the lost jungles of Guatemala. Once back in civilization, the heiress soon finds herself in another tough situation. Against her family's wishes, she fights to keep the flames of passion burning. Meanwhile, her brother Damian makes deals with an arms dealer; he will do anything to protect his secret.

== Production ==
Head writer Colet Abedi said she added "bitchy dialogue and fight scenes" to the original Mexican story. Late in production, about six episodes’ worth of scenes were never shot due to budget concerns. In addition, about 75 minutes of program were stretched to fill the two-hour weekly timeslot. Fox also received promotional consideration for this series from several automakers, including Cadillac, Jaguar and Lexus.

MyNetworkTV prepared to air this serial as 65 one-hour episodes on weekdays with a Saturday night recap. The network, facing low ratings, stopped development on future telenovelas. American Heiress had already finished shooting at Stu Segall Productions in San Diego before the decision was announced.

Heiress was originally intended to run in syndication as To Love & Die under the "Secret Obsessions" umbrella title. MyNetworkTV's website listed the show as "part of the Desire series," however, referring to its other telenovela brand.

Two-hour installments aired on Wednesday evenings through April, when the show switched to a one-hour slot. MyNetworkTV announced plans to run this show and Saints & Sinners once per week until October, with the remaining episodes appearing online. Network president Greg Meidel previously said the network would air the complete runs of both shows. However, the network unceremoniously yanked both telenovelas after the July 18, 2007 broadcast. Only 26 out of 65 hours aired.

== Cast ==
Actor	Role
Alicia Leigh Willis	Elizabeth Wakefield
Carter MacIntyre	Captain JD Bruce
Theresa Russell	Jordan Wakefield
Race Owen	Damian Wakefield
AnnaLynne McCord	Loren Wakefield
Robert Buckley	Matthew Wakefield

- Robert Buckley was also in the MyNetworkTV telenovela Fashion House.
- AnnaLynne McCord was also cast in the unproduced telenovela Rules of Deception.
- The Elizabeth Wakefield character in this series is not the same one played by Cynthia Daniel in Sweet Valley High.
