= Strategic Operations =

Strategic Operations, Inc. (STOPS) is a military, law enforcement and medical training company in San Diego, California which consists of a converted movie studio that has been dedicated to so-called "hyper-realistic" training. The president of Strategic Operations is Stu Segall. STOPS is part of Stu Segall Productions, an independent TV/Movie Studio.
