= List of Fashion House episodes =

This is a list of episodes for the single season MyNetworkTV telenovella Fashion House.

== Episodes ==
These episodes aired as a part of MyNetworkTV's weekday primetime schedule.

Source for names of episodes:

| No. | Title | Original release date |
|---|---|---|
| 1 | "House of Gianni" | September 5, 2006 |
Maria Gianni makes a secret deal with William Chandler, and receives more than she expected, and risks losing everything.
| 2 | "Unforgiven" | September 6, 2006 |
Having to settle her debts to William sexually, Maria tries to stop her son Luke from dating Michelle, an attractive new hire.
| 3 | "Secrets & Lies" | September 7, 2006 |
Maria develops a special attraction for William. Michelle, who is surprised by the grounds of her divorce, is drawn closer to Luke.
| 4 | "Broken Promise" | September 8, 2006 |
Luke's attraction to Michelle complicates his life. Meanwhile, it's discovered that William is operating for a secret third party.
| 5 | "The Best Laid Plans" | September 11, 2006 |
Michelle says yes to Luke's request to pose for a painting. Maria's affair with William causes a different change of events at therapy.
| 6 | "A Rose By Any Other Name" | September 12, 2006 |
Luke and Michelle become closer, and Michelle begins pushing husband Lance away. Luke's ex-girlfriend Tania begins to break up over her and Luke's split. Maria continues to worry about her feelings for William, who is plotting against her.
| 7 | "Payola" | September 13, 2006 |
Luke's best friend Michael and William both learn that they can't get what they want easily.
| 8 | "Friends With Benefits" | September 14, 2006 |
After Michelle's best friend Nikki and Michael have sex, Nikki treats Michael terribly. Luke and Michelle have their first kiss. William proposes to Maria.
| 9 | "A Private Affair" | September 15, 2006 |
Maria is surprised by William's proposal. Gloria, a former assistant of Michelle's husband Lance, meets with her ex-boyfriend Eddie to request for him to kill someone for her. Maria is angry when Luke arrives with flowers for Michelle.
| 10 | "Let It Ride" | September 18, 2006 |
A surprising secret about Gloria is learned. Lance murders someone. Luke and Michelle make attempts to get Michael and Nikki to work out their differences. Maria makes a life-changing choice.
| 11 | "Secrets and Gifts" | September 19, 2006 |
Maria tells everyone except son Luke about her engagement to William. Michelle is upset when Tania tells her about her meeting with Luke the day before. Lance, troubled by his murder of the investigator that Gloria employed to break up his marriage to Michelle, plans dispose of Gloria for good, but Gloria has some shocking news for him.
| 12 | "A New Face" | September 20, 2006 |
Gloria makes bold attempts to show Lance how she wants to be with him. Maria introduces an operation to find a new face for Gianni Fashion House representation. Tania makes attempts to sabotage Michelle. Luke is invited to dinner with Maria and William, and brings Michelle. Luke and Michelle are stuck in a dangerous place with Lance.
| 13 | "Portrait of a Lady" | September 21, 2006 |
Maria dislikes the wedding dress ideas her staff has given her. Employee John tries to show her his work again, but Maria involves him in a scheme to break up Michelle and Luke. Luke says yes to a request to paint Michelle and William for their wedding. Gloria's mom, Doris, becomes worried about her daughter with Lance and Eddie. Rodney, Lance's business partner, tries to get Lance to move on after his and Michelle's break up.
| 14 | "Multiple Offers" | September 22, 2006 |
While trying to hurt Nikki, Tania flirts with Michael. Gloria continually presses for Lance, and ticks off her mobster ex-boyfriend by rejecting his friendliness. Michelle gets an offer from a rival fashion house, by Maria and John try to interfering with her chances.
| 15 | "Political Posturing" | September 25, 2006 |
William pressure's Congressman Spangler to honor their deal. Lance gets into destruction and alcoholism, while Rodney watch helplessly. Tania beats Nikki in a shampoo campaign, and tries to badmouth Nikki to Michael. Luke and Michelle have sex for the first time.
| 16 | "Maternal Instincts" | September 26, 2006 |
Maria gives Michelle the job of running the "New Face of Gianni" fashion show for charity. William keeps his deceitful plans running. Gloria attempts to allure Eddie to impregnate her. Rodney watches Lance ruin his life and their business with alcoholism. Meanwhile, Lance finds new information about Gloria.
| 17 | "Madness in Manhattan" | September 28, 2006 |
Lance discovers Gloria's secret son. Maria sends John and Michelle to New York, hoping John will seduce Michelle. Luke and Michelle are tormented when Luke says he loves Michelle and she doesn't return the love. Nikki meets with Michael about him and Tania. To make Nikki feel better, Michael insults Tania, so Tania uses his blunder to her own gain. John's seduction of Michelle fails, so Maria goes to severe measures to split up Michelle and Luke.
| 18 | "William's Story" | September 29, 2006 |
Maria and William have a special dinner with Luke and Lexi. Luke and William take turns quizzing each other about their relationships.
| 19 | "(There's Got To Be) A Morning After" | October 2, 2006 |
Lexi, on Maria's prodding, tries unsuccessfully to seduce Luke, but makes Michelle believe she slept with him. Luke can't remember the night, and tries to apologize to her unsuccessfully. William fires his account Lance and sets up Congressman Spangler with a hooker. Maria tries to finish her wedding plans, but must to steal from Luke's trust fund to finish.
| 20 | "Bridezilla" | October 3, 2006 |
Maria is not remorseful for her wrongdoing against Luke and Michelle. Luke tries to heal his relationship with Michelle, but she refuses. Harold is upset over Maria's wedding dress, a stolen design from Michelle. Tania's photo shoot with Michael is affected by drugs. Gloria creates a new plan for Lance as Eddie's accountant. Eddie tells his thugs to kill a double-crossing man.
| 21 | "Rehearsal" | October 4, 2006 |
Luke tells Maria he doesn't believe he slept with Lexi. Gloria introduces Lance and Eddie. Eddie makes an unbelievable offer to Lance. Michelle continues rejecting Luke. William has a groom's party. Lexi feels shunned by Luke and his friends. Sophia comes to town to destroy Maria's bliss.
| 22 | "Do You Take This Woman" | October 5, 2006 |
Maria has surprising problems on her wedding day. Sophia and William plan for the wedding. Michelle continues rejecting Luke and has a violent clash with Tabia. Luke refuses to talk to Lexi. Nikki gives Tania a very spiteful surprise. William shocks the wedding guests when it's time to say, "I do."
| 23 | "Wedding Blues" | October 6, 2006 |
All are shocked by what happens when William refuses to marry Maria. While Sophia gloats in her success, William feels guilt of how Luke got caught in the middle. Michelle finds out that Maria used her wedding dress idea, and confronts Lexi. Lance agrees to work for Eddie.
| 24 | "The Ties That Bind" | October 9, 2006 |
Sophia confronts Maria and reveals the truth about the past they share. Lexi wants to explain thing Michelle won't listen. Lance signs a deal with Eddie, humiliating Rodney. William reveals shocking truths to Luke, who confronts his mother about it.
| 25 | "All in the Family" | October 10, 2006 |
Lance and Rodney find ways to keep Lance's money hidden. Gloria mother become sick. Luke sees Michelle about his problems, but she won't let him back in her life. Michael dislikes how Nikki handled Tania. Sophia says that Maria will lose her fashion house soon.
| 26 | "Revelations" | October 11, 2006 |
John figures out what he wants from Maria. Maria tries to get out of paying her debt back to William. Michelle and Michael figure out models for the new Face of Gianni campaign. Tania fights with Lexi, which reveals revelations. Luke refuses to believe Maria drugged him.
| 27 | "Stirring the Pot" | October 12, 2006 |
Luke continues to deny that his mother drugged him. Maria sabotages the Face of Gianni fashion show at the last minute. Lance rejects Gloria proceedings in favor of Michelle, which makes her press Eddie to kill Michelle. Michelle is complimented by Sophia. John and Tania create tension at the fashion show rehearsal. William surprises Luke with another secret.
| 28 | "Enough is Enough" | October 13, 2006 |
Luke faces his mother about his bank account. The Face of Gianni fashion show is a success. William pays a lot for a date with Nikki. Maria wants Lance to do business with her. She also takes credit for Michelle's designs, but Michelle stands up for herself.
| 29 | "Tania & Sophia's Story" | October 16, 2006 |
Sophia meets up with Tania at the Gate. The two share their own back stories with each other.
| 30 | "The Blow Up" | October 17, 2006 |
Michelle makes a surprise declaration. Lance and Rodney get arrested. Nikki and William's date foes well and they end up having sex. Luke faces Maria about stealing from hm, then later finds out that, on the night Lexi and Luke slept together, Maria drugged him. After bailing Lance out from jail, she makes him an offer.
| 31 | "Building Blocks" | October 18, 2006 |
Lance strikes a deal with Maria, and bring Eddie in as a silent investor. Nikki loved her night with William, but Maria uses this fact to fire Nikki. Luke reunites with Michelle. Gloria lies to Eddie order to persuade Eddie to kill Michelle.
| 32 | "Coup de Grace" | October 19, 2006 |
After Maria insults Michelle, Luke throws him out. Maria strikes a deal with Eddie to pay her debt. William is mad when Luke won't let him continue as his patron. Gloria's mom gets sicker. Tania hooks up with Eddie.
| 33 | "Irreconcilable Differences" | October 20, 2006 |
Tania blows another photo shoot, and Maria gives her just one more chance before being fired. Gloria's mother is put in the hospital, and doesn't want Maria to know what's wrong. William helps Michelle to put a story on TV, but it doesn't work, as Fashion Today's host team up with Maria to damage Michelle's story. Maria goes physical in her attempts to reunite Lance and Michelle.
| 34 | "Nursing the Wound" | October 23, 2006 |
Lance influences Michelle to help him. Nikki and Tania get into a fight at Suku. Michelle is dishonest to Luke about her and Lance. Lance, meanwhile, sends Michelle flowers. This causes problems when Luke reads the card.
| 35 | "Women On Verge" | October 24, 2006 |
Luke is irritated with Michelle dishonesty. Maria dislikes Tania's Face of Gianni pictures and wants to fir eher. Michael makes Luke help Tania. Gloria's mom is established as sick with Stage 4 cancer, but won't take treatment. William and Sophia tell Maria to pay them or give up her company. Eddie informs Gloria that Michelle's death has been organized.
| 36 | "Opportunity Knocks, Rings The Doorbell, And Beats Down Your Door!" | October 26, 2006 |
William and Sophia are upset when Maria pays them back, preventing their takeover, but are happy when they find Michelle needs financial support for her enemy fashion company. Michael and Luke try and intervene with Tania about drugs. Gloria is upset over her mother refusal of treatment. Lexi is again abused by Maria and meets with Michelle about becoming a 50/50 partner with her at the new fashion house.
| 37 | "Gaggle At the Gallery" | October 27, 2006 |
Nikki tells Michelle about her pregnancy. Maria decides that she must model her clothes. Gloria's mom makes Gloria promise to live a good life before she dies. Luke's show is a hit, until he reveals a painting of Michelle seeing Maria's reflection in the mirror, naturally offending both. Lance makes another attempt to get back Michelle. Gloria wants Eddie to stop Michelle's murder, but it's too late.
| 38 | "Michelle's and Luke's Story" | October 30, 2006 |
Michelle and Luke's tales are told from the beginning, as they talk to each other about Luke's surprising painting
| 39 | "The Shot Heard Round the..." | November 1, 2006 |
Gloria can't get Eddie to turn back on Michelle's death. Nikki reveals her pregnancy to William. Maria can't handle a new temp, and tells Dr. Woods about Carlos accidentally. Tania lures William with sex, but he won't let it upset his relationship with Nikki. William tells the D.A about Maria's dishonesty in getting Luke's money. Gloria's attempt to tell Michelle about her death turns tragic.
| 40 | "After the Assassin" | November 2, 2006 |
Gloria tries to save Michelle, but her own son Alek is shot instead. Tania drifts around William and Nikki, Sophia discovers Nikki's pregnancy, and wants her to move in with William. Eddie takes care of Alek's shooter. Maria's plot to separate Luke and Michelle continues. Gloria wants good news about Alek.
| 41 | "The Heart Attack" | November 3, 2006 |
Maria fakes a heart attack, and son Luke rushes to her. This leaves Lance to go to Michelle. John attempts to stand in for Maria during an interview, but makes an idiot out of himself. Nikki tells Michael about her pregnancy. Alek's condition becomes worse.
| 42 | "Second Chances" | November 6, 2006 |
Congressman Spangler reveals a campaign to stop identity theft, Eddie's biggest income source. Lance tries to move on Michelle. Sophia and Maria have a showdown in Maria's hospital room. The attorney prepares to charge Maria with fraud. Tania's fired by her agent, making her go into a drink and drug rampage.
| 43 | "Dark Days Dawn" | November 7, 2006 |
Michael and Luke save Tania and take her to rehab. Eddie strikes fear into Rodney about dropping him as a client. Sophia attempts to force Nikki in William's mansion. Gloria tells Lance to get out of her life. Maria tries to interfere with Michelle's company by giving her designs to an unknown third party. Luke considers moving to New York. The D.A. surprises Maria.
| 44 | "Sorry Seems To Be the Hardest Word" | November 8, 2006 |
With William gone, Nikki is supported by Michael. Maria finds it difficult in jail, especially when Sophia comes. Eddie tells Lance of a nasty plan of his, but Rodney insists on not playing along. Michelle and Gloria ask for forgiveness over what's happened. Lexi wants Michelle to keep away from Luke. Luke won't lie for Maria.
| 45 | "Truth and Consequences" | November 9, 2006 |
Luke feels guilty about lying for Maria. Tania refuses rehabilitative treatment, and calls on her friend to save her. Rodney breaks up his business partnership with Lance. Luke suggests that Michelle's business was sabotaged by Lance for Maria. Congressman Spangler discovers interesting information about Eddie, Lance, and Maria.
| 46 | "Sabotage" | November 10, 2006 |
Michelle goes to Lance about sabotaging her. Maria finds out that Dr. Woods has accumulated information about her, and, to catch him, gives him false information. Lexi attempts to sabotage Maria's photo shoot. Congressman Spangler talks to Maria about Eddie's dishonesty. Maria agrees to work with Lance to make him confess his crimes.
| 47 | "Down to the Wire" | November 13, 2006 |
To get Eddie's confessions on tape, Lance wears a wire, but things go wrong. Gloria has suspicions about Dr. Evans importance in getting a job interview. Michelle requests Luke to attend her fashion show. Tania continues her rampage on drugs and alcohol. Maria find new information on William's dealings.
| 48 | "Maria's Story" | November 14, 2006 |
Sophia tells William about his bank accounts being copied, unauthorized. Maria pays Dr. Woods a visit and tells him information he can give to William.
| 49 | "Miller's Crossing" | November 15, 2006 |
Lance challenges Officer Conti. Nikki worries about William's true feelings. Sophia tells Tania to get herself together. Maria feuds with John over his actions. Dr. Evans wants to get closer to Gloria. Maria gives the D.A. information about William. Luke takes Amanda to Michelle's fashion show.
| 50 | "Out Of the Woods" | November 16, 2006 |
William isn't in a good situation. Maria and Sophia's dislike goes above and beyond. Eddie hires a cop to get closer to Lance. Michael and Luke discover Tania is missing from rehab. Tania, upon Sophia's suggestion, goes to Dr. Woods. Michelle's company is a success until William's troubles degrade her to round one.
| 51 | "Mother I'd Like To Forget" | November 17, 2006 |
Michelle and Lexi try to find new funding for the company. Eddie arranges to take out Lance. Michael tells Luke he's in love with Nikki, but Luke dismisses his feeling. Gloria plans a new life. Sophia wants to prevent the meeting between Luke and Tania. Maria and Michael, both drunk, sleep together.
| 52 | "Nothing Ventured... Nothing Capital Gained" | November 20, 2006 |
Luke is mad about his mother and Michael sleeping together, but John Cotter tells him even more bad news about Maria. A venture capitalist group is a little too eager to support Michelle's company, but the man pulling the strings isn't one who Michelle wants to do business with. William blows his possibility to have Congressman Spangler bail him out, until Sophia intervenes. Dr. Evans and Gloria date, while Eddie gets his hands on Lance.
| 53 | "Safe Haven" | November 21, 2006 |
Eddie tries to quiet Lance, but it foes wrong. Luke tells Maria he doesn't want to see her any more. Tania continues to abuse drugs at her photo shoot, set up by Sophia. Luke and Michael get into a physical fight. Tania tells Nikki she's sleeping with William. Nikki finds danger at home.
| 54 | "After the Fall" | November 22, 2006 |
Nikki has a miscarriage at the hospital. Maria gives Lexi and offer. Luke pays William a trip to reveal the bad news. Sophia tries to force Spangler to bail William out of jail. Michael and Luke make amends. Lance goes to Rodney to help him hide from Eddie. Eddie's goons can't find Lance, so they are told to bring him Rodney.
| 55 | "Breaking Point" | November 24, 2006 |
Nikki accuses Maria about her accident. Dr. Woods and Dophia get Tania to act on her feelings of rage. Lexi deals with Maria and Clive to overtake Michelle's company and get her out. Sophia forces Congressman Spangler to get William out of jail. Eddie's goons kidnap Rodney. William visits Nikki, but she breaks up with him. Luke announces to Michelle his plans to move to New York. Nikki tells Michael the actual truth.
| 56 | "The Betrayal" | November 27, 2006 |
Rodney tries to get Eddie's goons away from Lance. William obsesses over Nikki and the baby. Michael tells Nikki of his feelings for her. Maria gets on the bad side of Hans and Harold. Michelle finds out about Lexi's deal with Maria. Maria and Michelle get into a fight.
| 57 | "Down To the Wire (Part Dos)" | November 28, 2006 |
Nikki discovers Michael slept with Maria, causing a rift in their relationship. Sophia pushes Tania's drug abuse. William tells Maria that their rivalry will only end in death. Eisner says to William that he should soon skip own. Eddie makes plans to go to Maria's fashion show.
| 58 | "Maria's Final Bow" | November 29, 2006 |
Maria makes enemies leading up to her fashion show. Luke attends to get Maria to admit her wrongdoing. Nikki, Tania, Lance, Eddie, Sophia, and William all attend to avenge her actions. Maria takes her final bow.
| 59 | "Too Little Too Late" | November 30, 2006 |
Luke searches for answers to a mystery, a mystery that Lance and Michelle may be able to answer. Michelle confronts Lance about Maria. Michelle told Luke about Lance and Maria's involvement with Eddie. Eddie's goons captures Lance.
| 60 | "In Loving Memory" | December 1, 2006 |
Luke confronts the insincerity of his life.
| 61 | "Falling Apart At the Seams" | December 4, 2006 |
Lance escapes from Eddie, but gets killed by a speeding car. Sophia and William give Tania an item of their appreciation. Lexi tells Eddie's goons where Michelle stays. William gives Luke a painting of him and his mother before leaving. Luke gets a call from John Cotter about Maria's killer and is willing to tell who did it for ownership of Gianni. Luke sets John up. Eddie kidnaps Michelle.
| 62 | "A New Foundation" | December 5, 2006 |
Luke rescues Michelle. Gloria tries to do right with Michelle. Harold and Hans try to get back at their former employer. Luke's dreams finally come true. It is revealed that Maria is still alive.

== Series recaps ==
| No. | Title | Original release date |
|---|---|---|
| 1 | "Series Recap #1" | September 27, 2006 |
| 2 | "Series Recap #2" | October 6, 2006 |
| 3 | "Series Recap #3" | October 25, 2006 |

== Highlights episodes ==
| No. | Title | Original release date |
|---|---|---|
| 1 | "Fashion House Highlights #1" | September 9, 2006 |
| 2 | "Fashion House Highlights #2" | September 16, 2006 |
| 3 | "Fashion House Highlights #3" | September 23, 2006 |
| 4 | "Fashion House Highlights #4" | September 30, 2006 |
| 5 | "Fashion House Highlights #5" | October 7, 2006 |
| 6 | "Fashion House Highlights #6" | October 14, 2006 |
| 7 | "Fashion House Highlights #7" | October 21, 2006 |
| 8 | "Fashion House Highlights #8" | October 28, 2006 |
| 9 | "Fashion House Highlights #9" | November 4, 2006 |
| 10 | "Fashion House Highlights #10" | November 11, 2006 |
| 11 | "Fashion House Highlights #11" | November 18, 2006 |
| 12 | "Fashion House Highlights #12" | November 25, 2006 |
