= Fashion House =

Television series

- Created by: Colet Abedi
- Directed by: David Hogan; Alex Hennech; Jim Slocum; Jeremy Stanford
- Opening theme: "Good at Being Bad"
- Ending theme: "Nobody" by Madeline Puckette
- Country of origin: United States
- Original language: English
- No. of seasons: 1
- No. of episodes: 65 (list of episodes)

Production
- Production locations: San Diego, California
- Production companies: Stu Segall Productions; 20th Century Fox Television

Original release
- Network: MyNetworkTV
- Release: September 5 – December 5, 2006

Fashion House is an American nighttime soap opera that aired at 9:00PM Eastern/8:00PM Central Monday through Saturday on MyNetworkTV stations. The series premiered on September 5, 2006, and concluded on December 5, 2006. It was produced by Twentieth Television with directors David Hogan, Alex Hennech, Jim Slocum and Jeremy Stanford.

Fashion House focused on greed, lust and ambition surrounding a corporate takeover of the business's hottest company. It starred Bo Derek as the ruthless head of the business and Morgan Fairchild as her long-time arch-rival.

Fashion House is an adaptation in the original Cuban script "Salir de Noche" written by Euridice Charadian & Osvaldo Huerta and was sold to MyNetworkTV by InjausTV.

As of 2021, the entire series can be seen on TubiTV.

== Production ==
Fashion House aired for a 78-episode run. MyNetworkTV aired it Monday through Friday for 13 weeks, with a "recap" show on Saturdays airing at 9 p.m. Eastern. It was based on the Cuban telenovela Salir de Noche ("Out in the Night"), produced by Miami firm XYSTUS. MyNetworkTV originally planned to use the umbrella title Secrets, later changed to Secret Obsessions, for its telenovelas in the 9:00 p.m. ET timeslot, with Fashion House as its first installment. While the show is set in Los Angeles, it was filmed at Stu Segall Productions in San Diego. Logo design was done by design director Chris Hoffman.

Its debut week saw modest viewership; an average 1.3 household rating and 2 share, slightly higher than its lead in, Desire, according to Nielsen. The second week dipped to 1.1 million viewers. During the next few weeks, ratings stabilized at a 0.6 rating. National advertising spots sold for between $20,000 and $35,000 for a 30-second spot as of September 2006.

== Cast ==
Actor	Role
Bo Derek	Maria Gianni – Luke's mother (via an affair with Charles Blakely). Widow of wealthy Antonio Gianni. Owner of House of Gianni, a fashion design firm in Los Angeles. Scheming and conniving with everyone, including her family. Notable for trying to break up Luke and his girlfriend, Michelle Miller, ultimately failing. Almost marries William Chandler, until she is told, by an angry Sophia, that Luke was her husband, Charles Blakely's son, and thereby brothers. Had catfights with Sophia Blakely, Tania Ford, and Michelle. Eventually "dies" (Tania Ford was the one who shot her), but is later shown at an island paradise, under an assumed name, very much alive, with Sophia on the other side of the pool.
Natalie Martinez	Michelle Miller – A new designer at House of Gianni. In love with Luke Gianni, to Maria's disgust. Divorced from Lance Miller. Best friend of Nikki; Michael; and designers Harold and Hans. Constantly is trying to keep her designs out of Maria's hands. After she found out that Maria had stolen her wedding dress design, she quits the House of Gianni. Opens her first design house, Michelle Miller Designs, but is backstabbed by her duplicitous partner, Lexi, with Maria's help. Almost killed by mobster Eddie twice, but is saved, both times, once by Gloria Thompson, the woman whom Lance cheated on her with and another by Luke who knew where she was and came to save her. After that, she and Gloria become friends. Eventually moves to New York with Luke, the love of her life, and opens her own design house.
Taylor Kinney	Luke Gianni – Maria's son; Sophia's stepson; William's paternal half-brother. An artist whose talent and looks he inherited from his birth father, Charles Blakely. Alternately loyal to and disgusted with his mother and her machinations. In love with Michelle Miller and eventually moves to New York with her, after selling House of Gianni.
Mini Anden	Tania Ford – Luke's ex-girlfriend. A very self-destructive model who hates Nikki Clark. She tended to fight with everyone, including Maria herself. Later was revealed to be the one who shot Maria Gianni and was thusly arrested.
Joel Berti	William Chandler – Maria's former fiancé; Luke's protective half-brother. Sophia Blakely's son. He and Sophia help Michelle open her own design house, but is stymied by Maria and her equally scheming assistant, Lexi. Protective of Luke, considers him family, and genuinely cares about him, even though it's for his own mysterious ends. Was charged with Tax evasion by a spiteful Maria.
Nicole Pulliam	Nikki Clark – Michelle's best friend, girlfriend of Luke's friend, Michael, who is carrying his child. Hated by Tania Ford, who has fought her numerous times. Injured in a home invasion engineered by mobster Eddie Zarouvian.
Robert Buckley	Michael Bauer – Photographer at House of Gianni. Luke's best friend, Nikki's boyfriend and father of her unborn child. Had an unwise affair with Maria, which nearly imperiled his friendship with Luke. Had been injured in a home invasion engineered by Eddie Zarouvian.
Donna Feldman	Gloria Thompson – Lance Miller's former assistant, who ruined his marriage to Michelle. Mother of Alec, her son by mobster, Eddie Zarouvian. She dumps Lance, becomes friends with Michelle (after saving her life during a botched assassination attempt and again saving her life after finding out about Eddie kidnapping her), and then finds love and a job with the doctor who was treating her son for his injuries.
Mike Begovich	Lance Miller – Crooked accountant, cheated on his wife, Michelle, with Gloria. Gloria eventually dumps him, and becomes his ex-wife's good friend. Eventually is killed.
Garrett Swann	Harold Huff- a designer at House of Gianni. He, along with fellow designer, Hans, is friendly and protective of Michelle, their new assistant. The two, aside from her best friend, Nikki, are perhaps Michelle's closest friends in fashion. In the end, he and Hans get Michelle most of her designs (including her wedding dress design) back, (the rest they sell on eBay) and gives the conniving Lexi Walker her comeuppance.
Tony Tripoli	Hans Daily- another designer at House of Gianni. Both he and Harold take Michelle under their collective wing and try their best to help her with support and advice. He and Harold get most of Michelle's precious designs (including her cherished wedding dress design) back to her, and give Lexi her comeuppance.
Erika Schaefer	Lexi Walker – Maria's duplicitous assistant who is as power-hungry as Maria herself ever was. Backstabs Maria by joining Michelle Miller at her new design house, and then she backstabs Michelle, by taking it over with Maria's help. Given her comeuppance by Harold and Hans (she fired them from House of Gianni) who get even with her by getting most of their friend, Michelle's designs (including her wedding dress design) back to her.
Ethan Erickson	John Cotter – Arrogant senior designer who irritates Harold and Hans, and is eventually fired by Maria for his missteps and his ego. Tries to seduce Michelle, but fails. Sends Luke information about Maria's plans to seduce Michelle. Arrested as he tried to bribe Luke into giving all of Gianni to him for the murder weapon as well as who killed Maria.
Jordi Vilasuso	Eddie Zarouvian – Gloria's former boyfriend; father of her son, Alec. Tries to have Michelle Miller killed, but the assassin ends up missing Michelle and injures Alec instead, which causes Eddie to kill the assassin. This bonds Michelle and Gloria as friends. He ends up arrested at the end for a home invasion attack on Michael and Nikki.
James Black	Rodney Griffith – Lance's accounting partner, who has suspicions about Lance's unethical behavior.
Mark Totty	Dr. Russell Woods – Maria's therapist, who listens to her problems.
Tippi Hedren	Doris Thompson – Gloria's mother; Alec's grandmother. She dies of cancer.
Morgan Fairchild	Sophia Blakely – William's mother, Luke's stepmother; Maria's hated rival (Maria slept with Charles Blakely, Sophia's husband, resulting in Luke's conception). Known for her sharp wit and sarcasm. She helps Tania and later on, Michelle in dealing with the villainous Maria. Dressed in red at her son's aborted wedding to Maria; and wore yellow to Maria's supposed "funeral". Had no grudge against her stepson, Luke, despite him being Maria's son, and, like William, considered him to be part of the family.
Jennifer Dorogi	Amanda Bhandarkar – Luke's one time fling from New York.
Will Beinbrink	Cop
Christopher del Valle	Pedro

== Theme ==
The theme song played during the opening credits was Chesterwhites "Good At Being Bad".

== Crossover ==
A later MyNetworkTV telenovela, American Heiress, made a brief reference to this show. In episode 17, which aired on June 6, Jordan Wakefield says that "since Maria Gianni died you can't find a decent dress in a store."

== International ==
=== Africa ===
- In Cameroon the show airs on LTM TV: show time 7pm (East Africa Time) from Mondays to Fridays, with reruns on Saturdays (22pm) & Sundays (17pm).
- In Ghana, the show aires on Saturdays and Sundays at 4:00 pm.
- In Kenya, KTN airs the show Sundays at 10:30.
- In Togo, the show aired on Saturdays at 10:00 am.

=== Asia ===
- In Hong Kong, China, Star World airs the show from Feb 6, 2007 weeknights at 10pm, plus weekdays and Saturday afternoons at 4.30pm.
- In Iran, GEM TV at 6 pm
- In India, Star World aired it at 11 pm and at 4:30 pm next afternoon.
- In Israel, HOT3 finished airing on 11/10/07. Star World also aired the series.
- In Malaysia, Star World airs it at 10 p.m. from Monday to Friday.
- The series airs at 5:00 p.m. UTC, Saturday through Wednesday, in the Middle East on MBC 4.
- In Nepal. Star World aired the show on weeknights at 11:15 pm and recapped it at 2:45 am and on 4:45 the next afternoon.
- In Pakistan, Star World airs the show on weeknights at 11:00pm with recap on Sundays at 11pm.
- In the Philippines, the show airs in Star World
- In Sri Lanka, ARTv Wednesday @ 9.30 pm – 10.30 pm & Repeat on Friday @ 9.30 pm – 10.30 pm.
- In Turkey, Fox Life weekdays at 05:00pm.

=== Europe ===
- In Belgium, Punt. aired the series Monday through Friday at 8pm
- In Bulgaria, bTV aired the series Monday through Friday at 6pm, with a "recap" show on Saturdays airing at 3pm. The series premiere was on January 1, 2007, and the last episode aired on March 27, 2007. Currently, reruns of the show can be seen on TV+.
- In Finland, MTV3 6 pm – 7 pm.
- In Italy, the series airs at 7:00 pm. from Monday to Friday on Sky Vivo. The series premiere was on March 12, 2007.
- In Ireland, TV3 airs it at 11:30 a.m. from Monday to Friday.
- In the Netherlands the show aired Monday – Friday 6.30pm on Tien until the station airing it was brought out by rival television network RTL 8. The show stopped airing on 17 August 2007, one day before the takeover.
- In Norway, TV2 Zebra
- In Portugal, the series airs from Monday to Friday on mornings (9:40 – 10:25) and late at night (2:55 – 3:40) on Fox Life.
- In Romania, Kanal D Romania
- In Serbia, the series runs weekdays at 6pm on FOX.
- In Slovenia the show airs Weekdays at 5.45pm UTC+1 on TV3 Slovenia, reruns also Weekdays at 11.45am UTC+1. It premiered on November 6, 2007. More info:
- In Spain, Cuatro started airing on September/17/07. 10:45 to 12:15 from Monday to Friday.
- In Sweden, Kanal 5 airs it at around 1:15 pm.

=== North America ===
- In El Salvador, Canal 12, Wednesdays @ 7 pm.
- In Trinidad and Tobago, the show airs on CNMG on Saturdays and Sundays at 8:30 pm.

=== Oceania ===
- In Australia, the complete series ran weekdays at 11am on the Seven Network in early 2007, and previously ran on Foxtel's W Channel and now is airing again at 4am.

=== South America ===
- In Venezuela, Televen 3 pm – 4 pm.

== See also ==
- MyNetworkTV telenovelas
