= The Great American Dream Vote =

- Starring: Donny Osmond
- Country of origin: United States
- No. of episodes: 5 (3 unaired)

Production
- Running time: 60 minutes

Original release
- Network: ABC
- Release: March 27 – March 28, 2007

The Great American Dream Vote is a reality television series hosted by Donny Osmond. It premiered on March 28, 2007, on ABC with a preview on March 27, 2007.

== Premise ==
The show featured contestants who wanted their dream to come true. The studio audience would pick the two finalists; those at home would select the winner via Internet voting. Despite the premiere's Dancing with the Stars lead-in, it only drew a less than 2.0 rating among audiences 18–49. ABC cancelled the show on March 29. The only known winner of the show was Russ Jowell, whose dream was to have a full head of hair.
