= MyNetworkTV telenovelas =

US television program

- MyNetworkTV widescreen logo used during telenovelas
- Genre: Telenovelas
- Country of origin: United States

Production
- Production locations: San Diego, Imperial Beach and Del Mar, California
- Camera setup: Multi-camera setup
- Running time: 60 minutes
- Production companies: Stu Segall Productions; 20th Century Fox Television

Original release
- Network: MyNetworkTV
- Release: September 5, 2006 – July 18, 2007

The MyNetworkTV telenovelas are Fox Television's attempt to create a successful low-cost programming franchise by adapting Spanish-language telenovelas for American viewers. While originally planned for syndication, the format became the original lineup of MyNetworkTV in 2006. Six limited-run serials were produced, each running about 65 episodes, and at least four others were halted in development.

New episodes aired from Monday to Friday – and weekend clip shows recapped the shows' storylines. Producers planned continuous cycles of thirteen-week serials with no repeats. Once one series ended, another unrelated melodrama would begin the following week. In total, MyNetworkTV planned to air 600 hours of original dramatic programming in HDTV every year.

The telenovela format was unsuccessful and ratings were unexpectedly low. An average of about 781,000 people tuned in to watch the telenovelas, according to Nielsen Media Research. Parent company News Corporation said MyNetworkTV lost two million dollars per week with the all-telenovela lineup.

Under new network president Greg Meidel, production and development stopped in early 2007. "Trying to get people to watch serialized dramas every night on MyNetworkTV was asking the impossible," he remarked. The novelas premiered on September 5, 2006 and last aired on July 18, 2007.

== Production ==
=== Development ===
==== Syndication plans ====
Paul Buccieri, Twentieth Television's programming chief, became fascinated by telenovelas in the 1990s, inspired by his Latina mother-in-law's devotion to such shows. He said that the nightly soap concept would work in the U.S. if given sufficient time. Along with colleagues Stephen Brown and Jack Abernathy, he started discussing the telenovela format in 2005.

Before it announced MyNetworkTV, Fox offered the telenovelas in syndication under as an anthology titled Desire, which would air one hour each weeknight starting in the fall of 2006. It originally planned to air three serials per season. They were originally intended to air as late night time programming. In December 2005, Bucceri said the company had already bought enough novela formats to air original shows for five years.

Fox then added a second hour and planned to use two umbrella titles: Desire and Secret Obsessions. After receiving lukewarm response from stations not owned by Fox, Twentieth Television decided to pitch the show for June 2006. It argued that teenagers are out of school and planted in front of their TV sets, while reruns dominate network schedules. The telenovelas were also briefly considered for placement on The CW.

==== MyNetworkTV ====
Fox Television Stations chairman Roger Ailes greenlit the format as a contingency plan for Fox-owned UPN stations. Then MyNetworkTV was introduced to advertisers on February 22, 2006, as a reaction to the demise of UPN and The WB. The telenovelas became the new network's weeknight lineup, along with clip shows on Saturdays.

MyNetworkTV targeted the telenovelas at the "Adults 18-49" demographic, which is a general audience. While the novelas had a few takers for a planned summer syndication run, Twentieth made those stations surrender the shows, thanks to a contract clause that let Fox take away the show if it is carried by a network.

As MyNetworkTV's debut grew closer, Fox dropped the idea of using two umbrella titles for its telenovelas. Desire became the title of the first series aired. The two umbrella titles reappeared in 2007, showing up during opening credits and on the network's Web site.

=== Budgets ===
Jack Abernethy, chief executive of Fox Television Stations, said before launch that MyNetworkTV's six-day-per-week format was the wave of the future because a traditional schedule costs too much. Each episode was said to cost about one-tenth the budget of traditional prime-time shows, and even less than the typical daytime soap. Another estimate said the serials cost $200,000 to $500,000, compared to the $2 million to $3 million cost of a mainstream primetime drama.

Unfortunately, ad revenue was not sufficient for the format to succeed. At the 2006 upfront season, MyNetworkTV secured less than $50 million in ad deals, compared to $640 million for the new CW network. National advertising spots sold for between $20,000 and $35,000 for a 30-second spot as of September 2006.

=== Writers’ dispute ===
At first, MyNetworkTV called its soap writers "translators" since the projects were adaptations of existing Spanish telenovelas. These people were also non-union, which soon led to a labor dispute. The eventual settlement with the Writers Guild of America led to higher-than-expected programming costs.

MyNetworkTV’s union deals doubled its programming costs to more than $1 million per week for each series. This significantly affected the telenovelas' bottom line. Before the dispute, News Corp. President-COO Peter Chernin said the format could "be profitable from day one."

=== Filming ===
The shows were shot at Stu Segall Studios in San Diego. The facility, built by a former porn producer, specializes in low-budget productions. Since Segall rented part of the lot to the U.S. government, the telenovelas were shot near a mock Iraqi village used to train military personnel.

As a cost-saving measure, producers tend to hire performers with limited acting experience. The same sets were reused in multiple shows. Producers built 53 shared living-room sets, which were repurposed by changing colors and camera angles to give them a different look. Also, scripts were finished before taping started, so that all scenes on the same set were filmed at the same time, out of episode order. Up to three shows were filmed at once.

The production model resembled that of movies more than normal American television series. Each complete series — equivalent to three seasons of conventional dramas — was filmed in about four months, as nine crews worked simultaneously, For example, Desire used three directors, 50 cast members, 200 bit players, 2,000 extras and 2,800 script pages (compared to 120 pages for features and 45 for dramas).

Two main groups worked on the novelas, one for the Desire brand and one for Secret Obsessions serials. The Desire shows, such as Watch Over Me, were more action-oriented to attract more male viewers. All of the telenovelas used the same narrators, actor Ray Van Ness III for the Secret Obsessions, and an uncredited female actor for the Desire brand.

The telenovelas are broadcast in high definition where available – and in letterbox format on standard definition broadcasts. During the all-novela period, MyNetworkTV promoted itself as "the first all HDTV network." In addition, early shows carried a SAP signal carrying a Spanish audio track, but an alternate closed captioning channel with Spanish translation was not used; in execution as most affiliates of the network never utilized SAP channels due to a lack of programming requiring it, and outside of major markets, the Spanish dub was never heard.

=== Comparison with Spanish telenovelas ===
MyNetworkTV’s telenovelas were much shorter than the originals: about 65 episodes, rather than 120 to 180 hours. Each show was scripted, filmed and completed as a whole. The network could not shorten or lengthen shows.

In familiar telenovela form, shows often began with the tag “MyNetworkTV Presents.” Yet the beginnings of shows featured long flashbacks intended to refresh viewers. The first two rotations also added titles to each episode.

The daily format also featured the “Story” episode. These were clip shows that outlined the development of a major character. They were used in lieu of reruns. In addition, MyNetworkTV's shows featured white, black and Hispanic actors in prominent roles and often showed interracial couples, along with gay subplots. These English novelas also toned down the high pitched emotionalism of conventional telenovelas.

The producers said they needed to account for the cultural differences with Latin countries. So while these serials were said to add campiness, cat-fights and gay sensibility, they were also seen to lack the "cultural depth" and "raw passion" of the Spanish originals.

Camilo Cano, the VP of Caracol Television International, which sold two telenovela formats to MyNetworkTV, said he was satisfied with the English versions. “The basic elements of the novela were respected,” he said, “which is what concerns us the most.” He said Caracol worked to ensure the adaptations were faithful to the original serials.

=== Broadcast rotations ===
All times are Eastern and Pacific (subtract one hour for Central and Mountain time)

	Telenovela	Time	Premiere Date	Finale Date
Fall 2006	Desire	8:00 p.m.	September 5, 2006	December 5, 2006
Fall 2006	Fashion House	9:00 p.m.	September 5, 2006	December 5, 2006
Winter 2006	Wicked Wicked Games	8:00 p.m.	December 6, 2006	March 6, 2007
Winter 2006	Watch Over Me	9:00 p.m.	December 6, 2006	March 6, 2007
Spring 2007	American Heiress	Weekly	March 13, 2007	July 18, 2007
Spring 2007	Saints & Sinners	Weekly	March 14, 2007	July 18, 2007

Had the daily format continued, Friends with Benefits and Rules of Deception would have debuted on June 5, 2007. Crossed Loves would likely have begun the second season in early September. It could have been joined in the Fall lineup by Friends & Enemies, which was announced in the 2006 pre-season upfront presentation (in the third-quarter slot taken by Friends with Benefits).

=== International broadcasts ===
Australian logo

The MyNetworkTV serial lineup was broadcast in Australia as FOXTELENOVELA on the W. Channel.

CKXT-TV, an independent station in Toronto, Ontario, Canada showed Desire and Fashion House, airing them in the afternoon time slot traditionally held by daytime soap operas. However, the station elected not to air any of the other telenovelas after the first cycle.

== Reaction ==
=== Campy melodramas ===
MyNetwork promoted its telenovelas as trashy melodramas, resembling prime time soap operas like Dallas and Dynasty. Paul Buccieri called them "guilty pleasures" and compared them to beach novels. While these shows attempted to adhere to the telenovela format and tone, the network's executives and producers developed their own campy interpretation of the genre. They added characters and situations that differed from the Latin American originals. As telenovelas are inherently implausible and cartoonish, both Hispanic and non-Hispanic audiences scorned the new adaptations.

Reviewers were resoundingly negative. For example, TV Guide's Matt Roush called one "something worse than nothing." Robert P. Laurence of the San Diego Union-Tribune complained of "amateurish acting, cheap sets and tedious scripts." Robert Bianco of USA Today remarked, "Think of the most incompetent soap opera you've ever seen, imagine something even worse, and there you have MyNetworkTV."

Paul Buccieri said that English-speaking audiences needed time to understand the genre. "We're sticking with it—we believe in this product," he said. Roger Ailes brought up MyNetworkTV in a Financial Times interview. "You should have seen us at Fox News Channel one year into it," he said. "I've had this job for a year and it takes a little time to get these things off the runway." Also, an executive of another television network told TV Week magazine that the existence of MNTV was "a miracle" because it went from concept to reality in only six months' time.

=== Ratings ===
MyNetworkTV's debut was far from successful. Desire scored a 1.1 household rating/2 share; Fashion House went up to 1.3/2. Fox had sold about half of its projections of $50 million in advance commercial sales.

The first two telenovelas averaged a 0.5 rating and a 2 share in the key 18-49 demographic. It averaged just over one million total viewers. The numbers dropped each night, according to Nielsen Media Research. These numbers were significantly lower than the programming that aired a year before, mostly UPN and WB programming. The telenovelas showed more hopeful ratings in markets like Miami, with large Hispanic populations.

The second set of telenovelas premiered to even lower numbers than the first pair. Wicked Wicked Games premiered to a 0.8 rating/1 share overnight rating during its first three nights, while Watch Over Me pulled a 0.7 rating/1 share. Both shows dropped by a 0.1 rating during the Monday-Wednesday period of their second week. The network sought better debuts for the shows since they premiered in December, while the major networks usually air reruns and the viewer presumably would sample programming on other networks.

MyNetworkTV's 200 affiliates struggled to promote the new format—and ratings dropped in some markets as much as 90 percent. Even Los Angeles was an under-performing market. One success story was Miami, where ratings more than doubled MyNetworkTV's national average.

=== Cancellation ===
Reports surfaced in December 2006, about a coming shift in MyNetworkTV's programming strategy. Greg Meidel became the network's first president in January; he explained the low ratings as a result of viewers' difficulty to commit to the same program every night, especially with higher-rated serialized programming on other networks. Another issue was that the typical MyNetworkTV telenovela viewer was 44 years old.

On February 3, 2007, the Saturday night clip shows vanished and were replaced by feature films. Then on March 1, 2007, MyNetworkTV announced that it quit developing scripted content altogether, putting an end to its slate of telenovelas. The network had at least four more serials in development, Friends & Enemies, Friends with Benefits, Rules of Deception, and Crossed Loves. It tentatively planned to cut their schedule to one night a week by fall before announcing that all such projects were scrapped.

Under the revised schedule, two hour installments of American Heiress and Saints & Sinners aired on Tuesday and Wednesday evenings through March and April. MyNetworkTV switched to one hour of each on Wednesdays for sweeps and never switched back. Meidel, the new network president, decided that the mixed martial arts IFC Battleground broadcasts on Monday would not deliver an audience to telenovelas the next night. In addition, the last set of telenovelas were preempted several times for reality specials and other programming before being dropped altogether.

MyNetworkTV previously announced plans to run the shows until October. After that, the remaining episodes were to appear online. Meidel previously said the network would air the complete runs of both shows. However, the telenovelas vanished without fanfare after their July 18, 2007 broadcast; only 26 out of each show's 65 hours were broadcast. The six telenovelas later became available on the Fox-owned streaming service Tubi in 2020 and 2021.

MyNetworkTV's new fall 2007 lineup did not fare substantially better than the canceled telenovelas, however. The mix of reality shows and movies averaged a 0.7 household rating during September. In addition, Paul Buccieri, the executive who championed the all-telenovela format, left Fox and became president and chief executive of Granada America in December 2007.

== See also ==
- The Jay Leno Show, a later attempt to strip the same show in prime time five nights a week
