= Desire (TV series) =

TV series

- Based on: Mesa para tres
- Directed by: Terry Cunningham; Dennis Dimster; P. David Ebersole; Alex Wright
- Starring: Nate Haden; Zack Silva; Michelle Belegrin; Tommy Dunster; Kelly Albanese
- Opening theme: "Always on Your Side" by Sheryl Crow
- Country of origin: United States
- Original language: English
- No. of episodes: 65 (list of episodes)

Production
- Production locations: San Diego, Imperial Beach and Del Mar, California
- Production company: 20th Century Fox Television

Original release
- Network: MyNetworkTV
- Release: September 5 – December 5, 2006

Desire is an American telenovela which debuted at 8:00PM Eastern/7:00PM Central on September 5, 2006, on the American network MyNetworkTV, and ended on December 5. It was produced by Twentieth Television.

The program starred Sofia Milos, Michelle Belegrin, Nate Haden, Kelly Albanese, Zack Silva, Chuti Tiu, Jessie Ward, Tanisha Harper, Will Rolland, Al Bandiero, Kristen Kerr, and Eliana Alexander. Haden and Silva played two brothers on the run from the Gamarras, a New Jersey crime family. They run from Bayonne to Los Angeles and become restaurateurs. Along the way, the pair find themselves on a heated trail of passion, betrayal, and murder over the woman they both loved (played by Belegrin).

The Desire brand is also used as an umbrella name for Twentieth's limited-run serials.

As of 2021, the entire series can be seen on TubiTV.

== Origins ==
The show first emerged in late 2005 as a September syndicated program for the stations on the FOX network to air in a weekend or midday time period. The idea was greenlit by Fox Television Stations Chairman Roger Ailes as a contingency plan for Fox-owned UPN stations. After receiving lukewarm response from stations not owned and operated by Fox, Twentieth Television decided to pitch the show for June 2006 on the premise that teenagers are out of school and planted in front of their TV sets, and that reruns dominate network schedules.

Desire had a few takers for a planned summer syndication run. Twentieth made those stations surrender the show, thanks to a clause in its contract that allows Fox to take away the show if it is carried by a network. It was also briefly considered for placement on The CW Television Network, but was taken off the table by Fox for use on MyNetworkTV.

Desire is based on the 2004 Colombian television program Mesa Para Tres (Table for Three), which aired on Caracol TV. Changes have been made in the location and the plot to make them more palatable to Americans. The serial was known as Table for Three and Three's a Crowd before its debut. The show was filmed at Stu Segall Productions in San Diego, using 25 principal actors, 250 supporting actors and about 2,000 extras.

== Cast ==
Actor	Role
Nate Haden	Louis Thomas
Zack Silva	Alex Thomas
Michelle Belegrin	Andrea Zavatti
Eliana Alexander	Rita Thomas
Al Bandiero	Peter Evans
Kelly Albanese	Cara Gamarra
Gregg Strouse	Cully
Daniel Bernhardt	Vincent
Fiona Hunter	Erica
Vivian Gray	Suzy Edwards
Chuti Tiu	Detective Rachel Lin
Joe Tabb	Marco Manetti
Xavier Tournaud	Christoph
Alexandria Schlereth	Jessica
Tanisha Harper	Heather
Will Rolland	Detective Hawkins
Chris DeRose	Joey Gamarra

== The Desire Brand ==
The original format of the Desire syndicated program was for three telenovelas to run with different titles. The Desire name was intended as an umbrella for all the separate telenovelas within. When MyNetworkTV picked up the telenovelas, Desire was used as the name of one series.

The network later revived the Desire name as an umbrella title. MyNetworkTV promoted Wicked Wicked Games and American Heiress as "part of the Desire series."

== Performance ==
Ratings for Desire fell below expectations. The debut scored a 2.0 rating and the first week averaged an 0.8 rating and 1 share. It averaged a 0.4 rating in the adult 18–49 demographic., falling to a 0.3 in its second week.

The program has also been sold to several international markets, however. In Asia, for example, Star World debuted the show on November 7, 2006, and in the United Kingdom Trouble has picked up the rights to show the series.

== Theme ==
The theme song is sung by Sheryl Crow and is called "Always on Your Side". It was released on her Wildflower CD. We 3 Kings also performed music in various episodes. The U.K. Based trio All Mighty Whispers also have their song Heaven Have Me Now included in an episode of the series.

== Profanity ==
The Parents Television Council filed a complaint with the Federal Communications Commission, saying that the word "shit" was used in scripted dialogue during the September 21st broadcast. The group also said the show was rated "TV-14," without the "L" descriptor that notes strong language. It argued that MyNetworkTV was "deliberately breaking the indecency law" and deserves "stiff fines."

== International sales ==
Country	Alternate title/Translation	TV Network(s)	Series Premiere	Weekly Schedule
Australia	Desire	Arena (pay TV)	Unknown	Unknown
United States	Desire	MyNetworkTV (first run)	September 5, 2006	Weeknights 8:00pm ET
(Arab League) Arab World	Desire	MBC 4	January 2007	Weeknights 8:00pm KSA
Israel	Desire: Table for Three	Star World	November 6, 2006	Weeknights 8:00pm
Vietnam; Thailand	Desire: Table for Three	Star World	November 6, 2006	Weeknights 9:00pm
Hong Kong; Mongolia; Malaysia; Philippines; Singapore	Desire: Table for Three	Star World	November 6, 2006	Weeknights 10:00pm
India; Brunei; Sri Lanka; Pakistan; Maldives	Desire: Table for Three	Star World	November 6, 2006	Weeknights 11:00pm, Repeated weekdays 4:30pm.
United Kingdom	Desire	Trouble	13 November 2006	Weekdays at 2pm, Repeated at 10pm.
Japan	Desire	GyaO	2006 Autumn	Internet-based broadcast with updates 3 times a week
Bulgaria	Престъпления и страсти ("Crimes And Passions")	bTV	March 28, 2007	Weeknights at 6pm
Serbia	Zločin i strast (Crime and Passion)	Fox TV	June 21, 2007	Weeknights at 6pm
Norway	Desire	TV 2 Zebra	Unknown	Weeknights at 6.10 pm
Finland	Pöytä kolmelle	MTV3	Unknown	Unknown
Sweden	Desire	ZTV	March 2, 2009	Weeknights at 9.05 pm
Slovakia	Túžba	TV WAU	April 15, 2013	Weekdays at 1.00 pm

== See also ==
- MyNetworkTV telenovelas
