= Stu Segall Productions =

Television studio in the United States

- Type: Private
- Genre: Studio
- Founded: 1991
- Founder: Stu Segall
- Headquarters: San Diego, California, U.S.
- Website: www.stusegall.com

Stu Segall Productions is a 70,000-square-foot (6,500 m^{2}) studio facility in San Diego, California.

== Filmings ==
The studio is used primarily for filming television series and movies in the San Diego area. Television shows shot in the studio or on location in San Diego include Veronica Mars, Silk Stalkings, Pensacola: Wings of Gold, Renegade, Push and all six MyNetworkTV limited-run serials. Feature films include Flying By, Hairy Tale, Raven, Fast Money, Illegal in Blue, and Dead On. Television films include The Dark, Surrender Dorothy, See Arnold Run, Tiger Cruise, and I Married a Monster.

The studio was built in 1991 and is sometimes referred to as Stu Segall Studios. Part of the facility is used for police and military training exercises under the operating name of Strategic Operations or STOPS. In addition, a satellite facility is located in North Hollywood, Los Angeles.
