= MyNetworkTV =

American television syndication service

- Type: Syndicated programming service
- Country: United States
- Broadcast area: Nationwide via OTA digital television
- Affiliates: List of affiliates
- Headquarters: Los Angeles, California

Programming
- Picture format: 720p (HDTV, upscaled to 1080i locally in some markets); 480i (SDTV) 16:9 widescreen or 4:3 letterbox

Ownership
- Owner: Fox Corporation
- Parent: Fox Television Stations
- Key people: Frank Cicha; Jack Abernethy

History
- Founded: February 22, 2006; 20 years ago
- Launched: September 4, 2006; 20 years ago

Links
- Website: www.mynetworktv.com

MyNetworkTV (sometimes abbreviated as MyTV) is an American commercial broadcast syndication service and former television network owned by Fox Corporation, operated by its Fox Television Stations division, and distributed via the syndication structure of Fox First Run. Under the ownership structure of Fox Corporation, the service is incorporated as a subsidiary company, Master Distribution Service, Inc..

MyNetworkTV began its operations on September 4, 2006, with an initial affiliate lineup covering about 96% of the country, most of which consisted of stations that were former affiliates of The WB and UPN that did not join the successor of those two networks, The CW.

On September 28, 2009, following disappointment with the network's results, MyNetworkTV dropped its status as a television network and transitioned into a programming service, relying mainly on repeats of recent broadcast and cable series.

Fox Corporation retained MyNetworkTV after the acquisition of 21st Century Fox by the Walt Disney Company was completed on March 20, 2019.

== History ==
=== Origins ===
MyNetworkTV arose from the January 2006 announcement of the launch of The CW, a television network formed by CBS Corporation and Time Warner which essentially combined programming from The WB and UPN onto the scheduling model of the former of the two predecessors. The CW would go on to become the fifth national TV network behind Fox, though it's never managed to attain "major" status similar to Fox's, mostly due to viewership and ratings issues.

As a result of several deals earlier in the decade, Fox Television Stations owned several UPN affiliates, including the network's three largest stations: WWOR-TV in Secaucus, New Jersey (part of the New York City market), KCOP-TV in Los Angeles, and WPWR-TV in Gary, Indiana (part of the Chicago market). Fox had acquired WWOR and KCOP after purchasing most of the television holdings of UPN's founding partner Chris-Craft Industries, while the company purchased WPWR in 2003 from Newsweb Corporation. Despite concerns about UPN's future that arose after Fox purchased the Chris-Craft stations, UPN signed three-year affiliation agreement renewals with its Fox-owned affiliates in 2003. Those agreements' pending expiration (along with those involving other broadcasting companies) in 2006, as well as persistent financial losses for both UPN and The WB, gave CBS Corporation and Time Warner (the respective parent companies of UPN and The WB) the rare opportunity to merge their respective struggling networks into The CW.

The CW's initial affiliation agreements did not include any of the UPN stations (nor a lone independent station) owned by Fox Television Stations. In fact, as part of a 10-year affiliation deal with The WB's part-owner, Tribune Broadcasting, the coveted New York City, Los Angeles, and Chicago affiliations all went to Tribune-owned stations (WPIX, KTLA, and WGN-TV, respectively). In response to the announcement, Fox promptly removed all network references from logos and promotional materials on its UPN affiliates and ceased on-air promotion of UPN's programs altogether. However, in all three cases (especially in the cases of Los Angeles and Chicago), the UPN affiliate was the higher-rated station; CW executives were on record as preferring the "strongest" WB and UPN affiliates.

Media reports speculated that the Fox-owned UPN affiliates would all revert to being independent stations, or else form another network by uniting with other UPN and WB-affiliated stations that were left out of The CW's affiliation deals. Fox chose the latter route and announced the launch of MyNetworkTV on February 22, 2006, less than a month after CBS and Time Warner announced the formation of The CW on January 24. The Guardian reported that Fox would utilize MySpace, the social networking website its parent company, News Corporation, had acquired in 2005, to help promote MyNetworkTV. Fox would also utilize MySpace's content-sharing model when it launched MyNetworkTV's website.

=== Original format ===
MyNetworkTV's original telenovelas Desire scored a 1.1 household rating/2 share; Fashion House went up to 1.3/2. Fox had sold about half of its projections of $50 million in advance commercial sales. On March 7, 2007, MyNetworkTV began to be included in Nielsen's daily "Television Index" reports, alongside the other major broadcast networks, although it was still not part of the "fast nationals" that incorporate the other networks.

Last-minute changes to MyNetworkTV's 2007-08 Fall schedule included re-titling the reality series Divorce Wars to Decision House, and the addition of Celebrity Exposé and Control Room Presents to the network's Monday lineup as well as a one-hour IFL Battleground, followed by NFL Total Access on Saturdays.

In response to the telenovela lineup's poor ratings performance, highlighted by an average household rating of 0.7%, reports surfaced that Fox executives were planning a major revamp of MyNetworkTV's programming, decreasing its reliance on telenovelas and adding new unscripted programs to the schedule such as reality shows, game shows (such as My GamesFever), movies and sports, and a possible revisit to a deal with the Ultimate Fighting Championship. However, MyNetworkTV instead signed a deal with another mixed martial arts organization, the International Fight League, in conjunction with Fox Sports Net.

On February 1, 2007, Greg Meidel, who was named to the newly created position of network president just ten days earlier, confirmed the rumors and unveiled a dramatically revamped lineup. The intent of the shakeup was to increase viewer awareness of the network (and boost viewership, in turn), as well as to satisfy local affiliates who were disappointed over the poor ratings performance of the network under its initial format. After March 7 (when Wicked Wicked Games and Watch Over Me finished their runs), telenovelas were reduced to occupying only two nights of its programming schedule, airing in two-hour movie-style blocks rather than each of the serials airing in a one-hour, five-night-a-week format. The remainder of the schedule included theatrical movies and the new IFL Battleground (originally titled Total Impact). In addition, the Saturday night telenovela recaps ended immediately, with movies running on that night until March. The 1986 film Something Wild aired on February 3, becoming the network's first non-telenovela presentation.

Specials (ranging from the World Music Awards to the Hawaiian Tropic International Beauty Pageant) and reality programming were also a part of the network's reformatting, with the first two specials airing on March 7. MyNetworkTV also reduced its telenovela programming to a single night each week, with American Heiress and Saints & Sinners airing for one hour each on Wednesdays until their unexpected termination, due to incompatible flow with IFC Battleground from Monday to Tuesday as far as promotions. The new Thursday night movie block featured mostly action/adventure films, with Friday night featuring a mix of contemporary classic films, beginning on June 5.

A side effect of the new programming schedule was the loss of the network's claim that it was the only U.S. broadcast network at the time to have its entire programming schedule available in high definition, due to the IFL, some of the network's movies and additional programs being produced exclusively in 480i standard definition.

=== Revamping the schedule ===
In the Fall of 2007, MyNetworkTV dropped telenovelas altogether, and began to air reality series and sports programs. On September 1, 2007, the network aired its first live program, the men's final of the AVP Croc Tour's Cincinnati Open. The network debuted its first sitcom, the Flavor Flav vehicle Under One Roof, on April 16, 2008; because the series used Canadian writers, it was unaffected by the 2007–08 Writers Guild strike.

The network's shift from telenovelas to reality shows and movies produced only a small bump in the ratings. It averaged only a .7 household rating during September 2007. MyNetworkTV continues to be the second lowest-rated English-language broadcast network in the United States, ahead of only Ion Television.

On February 26, 2008, the network announced it had picked up the rights to air WWE SmackDown, which left The CW at the end of September 2008. The first SmackDown episode on MyNetworkTV aired on October 3, 2008. The first episode of WWE SmackDown pulled in the largest audience in MyNetworkTV history with 3.2 million viewers, and for the first time, put the network in fifth place for the night – ahead of The CW – and was the top-rated program that night in the male 18-34 and 18-49 demographics. The network went back to sixth place shortly afterward. Of the six broadcast networks, Nielsen Media Research said that only MyNetworkTV had increased viewership, with 1.76 million viewers per night, up 750,000 from the previous season.

On January 5, 2009, MyNetworkTV aired episodes of the 2002 revival of The Twilight Zone (which originally aired on UPN, one of the networks MyNetworkTV had replaced). The series helped the network's ratings rise, along with WWE SmackDown, becoming the second highest-rated program on the network. The highest-rated program to have ever aired on MyNetworkTV is a December 10, 2008, broadcast of the 1990 comedy film Home Alone, which brought in 3.70 million viewers (although not a record), but earned a 1.4 rating among the 18-49 adult demographic.

=== Current format ===
On February 9, 2009, Fox Entertainment Group announced that MyNetworkTV would convert from a television network to a programming service, similar to that of The CW Plus, with a focus on repeats of acquired programs originally aired on broadcast and cable networks and in first-run syndication. Litton Entertainment had reportedly expressed interest in leasing MyNetworkTV's Saturday evening time slots, which MyNetworkTV chose to instead turn back over to its affiliates. MyNetworkTV began airing more syndicated programming in the fall, which included game shows and dramas, five nights a week. This required the network's affiliates to re-negotiate a new affiliate agreement with the new corporation within Fox operating MyNetworkTV, Master Distribution Service, Inc., though it also gave a full and unencumbered "out" to stations which chose to end their association with MyNetworkTV under this guise, which Ion Television did with their three affiliates.

On April 12, 2010, WWE announced that WWE SmackDown would move to the Syfy cable channel that October; the move left MyNetworkTV with no first-run programming other than that it shared with its syndicators. Despite the lack of first-run programming, MyNetworkTV renewed its affiliation contracts for three more years on February 14, 2011. The programming service has seen significant viewership growth since its 2006 startup as a television network. Although ratings on MyNetworkTV do not match those of the other broadcast networks, Nexstar (future owner of rival network The CW at the time) CEO Perry Sook noted his approval of its business model at the time, saying that Nexstar's MyNetworkTV stations get 'more (local ad) inventory per hour' than they would be associated with a traditional network such as Fox or ABC. Nexstar has since become the owner of, and the largest affiliate base for, The CW, through several acquisitions and since converted three MyNetworkTV affiliations into CW affiliations including WPHL-TV which was the largest MyNetworkTV affiliate by market size that is not owned and operated by the Fox Television Stations subsidiary of Fox Corporation, which owns the programming service.

In announcing its fall schedule for the 2012–13 schedule, MyNetworkTV executives revealed that the programming service increased ratings over the previous year, and rated as the #6 most-watched network during the 2011–12 season with around 2.5 million viewers.

Though MyNetworkTV would earn recognition from some as a sixth-ranked TV network at launch after The CW (though MyNetworkTV would never attain "major" network status), this tenuous status would eventually be lost as digital multicast networks, such as MeTV, gained wider distribution and more critical acclaim for their classic television schedules. Ion Television, which had struggled in the mid-2000s due to management struggles and programming issues after attempting to become a "family-friendly alternative" (according to Pax's advertising & marketing promos) to the "Big Four" (NBC, CBS, ABC, & Fox) as "Pax", would also stabilize and eventually come to ratings parity with MyNetworkTV before passing it by the mid-2010s.

== Programming ==
MyNetworkTV began operations on Tuesday, September 5, 2006, with the premieres of its two initial series. Some affiliates unofficially began branding their stations well beforehand in July into August to allow viewers to grow accustomed to their new brandings, though most fulfilled their existing WB and UPN network commitments and did not start branding in earnest until September 1 (the Friday before), when the majority of those affiliate agreements expired. The network provided a block of preview programming that aired the day before on September 4, though it did not launch officially that day due to the low audience figures traditionally associated with the Labor Day holiday.

Initially, programming aired Monday through Saturdays from 8:00 to 10:00 p.m. (Eastern and Pacific Time). As of July 2026, MyNetworkTV broadcasts ten hours of primetime programming each week, airing on Monday through Friday evenings from 8:00 to 10:00 p.m. Eastern and Pacific. MyNetworkTV does not air programming on weekends, the only broadcast service not to in the United States.

Heavy local sports preemptions were previously a problem for MyNetworkTV at its launch, as they were for all of the U.S. broadcast networks that have debuted since the January 1995 launches of The WB and UPN. These would become less of an issue with the end of the network's telenovela, where an airing of the pre-empted telenovela episode rescheduled as soon as possible on the same day as required by default rather than the flexibility that affiliates of UPN, The WB or The CW had to push a show off to a weekend slot.

With the service's switch to an all-rerun schedule in 2009, this effectively allows stations to pre-empt repeat programming at will to fit in sporting events (mainly those provided by syndication services such as ESPN Regional Television and the ACC Network, as some local events that had aired on its affiliates have moved to regional sports networks in the time since MyNetworkTV launched) without much consequence. During the telenovela era, affiliates often scheduled contractual "make goods" of the network's daily schedule between 3:00 and 6:00 a.m. local time. Not only are these light viewing hours, but they air after Nielsen processes its preliminary morning network ratings.

=== Telenovelas ===
Australian logo

The network's original format focused on the 18-to-49-year-old, English-speaking population with programming consisting exclusively of telenovelas (a version of the soap opera format rarely attempted on American television outside of Spanish language broadcast networks, much less in primetime), starting with Desire and Fashion House. Originally, each series aired Monday through Friday in continuous cycles of 13-week seasons, with a one-hour recap of the week's episodes airing on Saturdays; when one series ended, another unrelated series would begin the following week. The fifth and sixth series, American Heiress and Saints and Sinners, appeared one hour per week on Wednesdays before abruptly vanishing from the schedule. The MyNetworkTV serial lineup was broadcast in Australia on the W. Channel under the block name FOXTELENOVELA. In Canada, the first Desire/Fashion House cycle aired weekday afternoons on Toronto independent station CKXT-TV, which decided not to air subsequent cycles for unknown reasons.

=== Proposed programming ===
The announcement of the network also stated that additional unscripted reality-based and current-affairs programming were in development. These included:

- Catwalk, a series similar to America's Next Top Model
- On Scene, a crime-based news magazine produced by Fox News
- An American version of the quiz show Britain's Brainiest
- An American version of the ITV series Love Island, which would later be picked up by CBS

MyNetworkTV abandoned the development of these programs in mid-2006, choosing to focus solely on telenovelas.

=== Other programming ===
Later announcements by Fox regarding additional programming to air on MyNetworkTV owned-and-operated stations – such as Desperate Housewives repeats in traditional weekend syndication, a trial run of the sitcom Tyler Perry's House of Payne (which later moved to TBS), and the daytime viewer-participation game show My GamesFever – never applied to the network as a whole.

To satisfy E/I requirements, some affiliates carry the Litton Go Time block while others carry Xploration Station.

== Affiliates and branding ==
At launch, MyNetworkTV's affiliation base consisted of former WB or UPN affiliates. Along with Fox's existing UPN station group, three Tribune WB stations and three CBS-owned UPN stations signed up with the network. Sinclair Broadcast Group signed up 17 of their stations on March 6, 2006; this was followed by deals with Raycom Media and Capitol Broadcasting Company one day later. Four LIN Media stations agreed to affiliate on April 26, 2006; additional affiliation deals were later announced that placed MyNetworkTV on digital subchannels or on stations that already agreed to carry The CW, including KNVA in Austin, Texas, and KWKB in Iowa City, Iowa. Carriage in Miami, New Orleans, Denver and Boston was secured by July and most remaining vacancies in the top 100 television markets were filled by August. The Boston affiliate, WZMY-TV in Derry, New Hampshire, already filed a trademark for "MyTV" on July 6, 2005, lending to speculation it would file a lawsuit against Fox over the name.

Most affiliates, including all stations owned by Fox Television Stations, initially utilized a naming convention including the "My" moniker and network logo, but have been downplayed following MyNetworkTV's business model shift. In particular, Cincinnati's WSTR-TV revived its former "Star 64" brand, WPMY in Pittsburgh rebranded as "22 The Point" WPNT, and KAUT-TV rebranded as "OK43", and again as "Freedom 43"; both WPNT and KAUT switched to The CW in 2023. Some MyNetworkTV stations have rebranded as extensions of a parent station, particularly Fox's owned-and-operated stations, such as WDCA becoming "Fox 5 Plus".

By 2014, when the service acquired off-network reruns of The Walking Dead, MyNetworkTV boasted a carriage rate of 97 percent of U.S. television households.

=== Owned-and-operated stations ===
The following are MyNetworkTV stations owned and operated by Fox Television Stations, LLC, a subsidiarity of the Fox Corporation.

Market(s)	Station	Channel
Bemidji, Minnesota	KFTC	26
Chicago, Illinois (Gary, Indiana)	WPWR-TV	50
Dallas–Fort Worth, Texas	KDFI	27
Houston, Texas	KTXH	20
Los Angeles, California	KCOP-TV	13
Minneapolis–St. Paul, Minnesota	WFTC	9.2
Orlando–Daytona Beach, Florida	WRBW	65
Phoenix, Arizona	KUTP	45
San Jose–San Francisco–Oakland, California	KICU-TV	36
Secaucus, New Jersey–New York City, New York	WWOR-TV	9
Tacoma–Seattle, Washington	KZJO	22
Washington, D.C.	WDCA	20

=== Former owned-and-operated stations ===
Market	Station	Years owned	Current ownership status
Baltimore, Maryland	WUTB 24	2006–2013	Roar affiliate owned by Deerfield Media (Operated through an SSA by Sinclair Broadcast Group)
Rock Hill, South Carolina - Charlotte, North Carolina	WMYT-TV 55	2013–2020	CW O&O (previously MyNetworkTV) affiliate owned by Nexstar Media Group
