= Overwatch animated media =

Computer-generated videos

'Overwatch'
- Genre: Science fiction
- Created by: Blizzard
- Based on: Overwatch by Blizzard

Production
- Production company: Blizzard

Original release
- Network: YouTube
- Release: 2016

Overwatch is a series of shorts published by Blizzard Entertainment and released in YouTube in 2016, several computer-generated cinematic trailers and teasers are made, as well as animated short films, to promote and develop the story for their 2016 first-person shooter video game, Overwatch. The shorts have been met with positive reception from fans and online publications alike.

== Plot and setting ==
Overwatch is set in a fictionalized version of Earth, sixty years into the future; the Overwatch organization was established thirty years prior to this future setting. These pre-game events are also chronicled by Soldier: 76 in his origin story video.

The story of Overwatch begins with the in-universe "Omnic Crisis" event; the event's cause is unknown. However, prior to the event, humanity developed omnics, artificial intelligence (AI) that led efforts in creating global economic equality and manufacturing. These AI bots were soon developed by omniums, large facilities designed specifically for their creation. Eventually, the world's omniums began producing hostile omnics that attacked humans; the United Nations (UN) established a task force called Overwatch, composed of soldiers and scientists, in response to this Omnic Crisis. Overwatch was originally led by Gabriel Reyes and Jack Morrison, who are known in the game as Reaper and Soldier: 76, respectively. Morrison's battlefield success helped him take control of Overwatch from Reyes, relegating Reyes to lead Blackwatch, a covert operations division of Overwatch. The Omnic Crisis would eventually end, with Overwatch subsequently presiding over a period of maintained peace; those born in this period would be called the "Overwatch Generation". After a few decades, Overwatch would soon face allegations of corruption, mismanagement, weapons proliferation, and human rights abuses, among others, leading to worldwide protests against the organization. Infighting between Reyes and Morrison also occurred; during a UN investigation of Overwatch, a fight broke out at Overwatch's headquarters, leading to an explosion, which destroyed the building and supposedly killed both Reyes and Morrison. The UN would soon pass a resolution that declared any act in the name of Overwatch illegal. This resolution, dubbed the Petras Act, was signed six years prior to the game's setting. In the Soldier: 76 Origin Story animation, Morrison accounts that the allegations against Overwatch were part of a conspiracy.

Following this back story are five of the first six animated shorts (the exception is Dragons, which takes place during the era in which Overwatch maintained peace), as well as the first cinematic trailer.

Tracer in the Alive short

=== Characters ===
List indicators

This section includes characters who will appear or have appeared in one or more animated short.

- An empty grey cell indicates the character was not in the short, or that the character's official presence has not yet been confirmed.
- ^{A} indicates an appearance through archival footage or audio.
- ^{C} indicates a cameo role.
- ^{P} indicates an appearance in onscreen photographs.
- ^{V} indicates a voice-only role.

Character	Voiced by	First appearance	Overwatch shorts			Overwatch 2 shorts	
Character	Voiced by	First appearance	Cinematic Trailer (2014)	Season 1 (2016)	Season 2 (2016–2018)	Zero Hour (2019)	OW2 shorts (2022)
Playable characters
Ana	Aysha Selim	Recall^{P}		Appeared^{P}		Appeared^{P}	
Ashe	Jennifer Hale	Reunion			Main		
Bastion	Chris Metzen	The Last Bastion		Main			
Brigitte	Matilda Smedius	Honor and Glory			Supporting	Supporting	
Cassidy	Matthew Mercer	Recall^{P}		Appeared^{P}	Main		
D.Va	Charlet Chung	Shooting Star			Main		
Echo	Lauren Tom (Reunion); Hojo Shin (Zero Hour)	Reunion			Supporting	Supporting	
Genji	Gaku Space	Recall^{P}		Main		Supporting	
Hanzo	Paul Nakauchi	Dragons		Main			
Junker Queen	Leah de Niese; Davida McKenzie (young)	The Wastelander					Main
Junkrat	Chris Parson	The Wastelander					Guest^{C}
Kiriko	Sally Amaki	Kiriko					Main
Mei	Elise Zhang	Rise and Shine			Main	Main	
Mercy	Lucie Pohl	Recall^{P}		Appeared^{P}		Supporting	
Reaper	Keith Ferguson	Cinematic Trailer	Main	Supporting	Supporting		
Reinhardt	Darin De Paul	Recall^{P}		Appeared^{P}	Main	Supporting	
Roadhog	Josh Petersdorf	The Wastelander					Appeared
Sojourn	Cherise Booth	Zero Hour^{P}				Appeared^{P}	Main
Soldier: 76	Fred Tatasciore	Recall^{P}		Main		Appeared^{P}	
Sombra	Carolina Ravassa	Infiltration			Main		
Torbjörn	Keith Silverstein	Recall^{P}		Appeared^{P}		Appeared^{P}	
Tracer	Cara Theobold	Cinematic Trailer	Main	Main		Main	
Widowmaker	Chloé Hollings	Cinematic Trailer	Main	Main	Supporting		
Winston	Crispin Freeman	Cinematic Trailer	Main	Main	Appeared^{A}	Main	
Wrecking Ball	N/A	The Wastelander					Appeared^{P}
Zarya	Dolya Gavanski	Infiltration			Guest^{C}		
Non-playable characters
Alejandra	Brigitte Kali	Hero		Supporting			
Akari		Kiriko					Supporting
Asa Yamagami		Kiriko					Supporting
Balderich von Adler	Piotr Michael	Honor and Glory			Supporting		
Brian	Sam Wiser	Cinematic Trailer	Supporting				
Dae-hyun Park	Johnny Young	Shooting Star			Supporting		
Geiger	N/A	The Wastelander					Supporting
Harold Winston	Greg Chun	Recall		Supporting			
Katya Volskaya	Gulmira Mamedova	Infiltration			Supporting		
Meri		The Wastelander					Supporting
Mason Howl		The Wastelander					Supporting
Noah Tremblay		Calling					Supporting
Sojiro Shimada	Cary-Hiroyuki Tagawa	Dragons		Appeared^{V}			
Tekhartha Mondatta	Sendhil Ramamurthy	Alive		Appeared			
Timmy	Kyle Harrison Breitkopf	Cinematic Trailer	Supporting				
Mr. Yoshida		Kiriko					Supporting

== Background and development ==
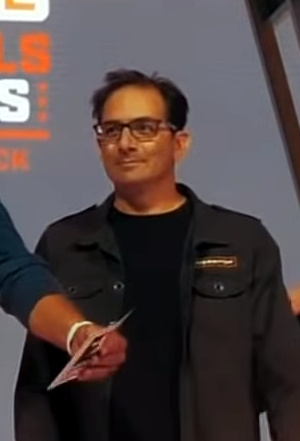
Overwatch Lead designer Jeff Kaplan in 2019

Overwatch's animated media is interconnected, taking place in the same continuity. Through this animated media, in conjunction with comics and fictional news reports, Blizzard developed the story of Overwatch, rather than including it in the video game. Within the video game, the story is instead "hinted at through environments and character quips, with each individual personality reacting to the events of the battle in their own way", as Kirk McKeand of The Telegraph detailed.

Jeff Chamberlain, the director of the initial Overwatch cinematic trailer, revealed that Blizzard opted to develop their storytelling through this unconventional method because, "A long time ago we [realized Overwatch] doesn't have a linear storyline, like other games we do," adding that "[Blizzard] has been doing storytelling outside of the game, for Draenor and Legacy of the Void, so we have a precedent for short animations outside the game." Chamberlain said that they "wanted to create a lot of stories as quickly as we could", and in conjunction with making the cinematic release trailer, found the animated shorts to be best way to present these stories. While they were initially focused on exposition with the first shorts, further shorts are more focused on developing these characters and other stories, rather than driving to any narrative conclusion. When these stories have multiple characters involved, Blizzard may opt to instead create a digital comic.

The animated shorts take between six and eight months to complete from storyboarding to rendering, and there are usually two to three shorts in the production line. The animation team sometimes works in conjunction with the art and level design teams; Chamberlain said that the "Watchpoint: Gibraltar" map was developed simultaneously with the Recall short which took place at that location, and the animation and level design team worked to incorporate the assets and ideas developed by the other team. To further develop the game's story, Blizzard released short videos that include animated stills with narrated voice-overs, such as the aforementioned Soldier: 76 Origin Story video. In addition, Blizzard released A Moment in Crime Special Report: "The Junkers", which was a fake news report chronicling the criminal activities caused by Junkrat and Roadhog. Ana was the first character added to the game post-release; beginning with her, each new character has had their addition to the game's playable roster accompanied by a short origin story video. Blizzard used an animated short Junkertown: The Plan, starring Junkrat and Roadhog, to introduce the new Junkertown map for the game during the 2017 Gamescom.

Overwatch's lead designer Jeff Kaplan considers The Last Bastion as the last installment of the first season of animated Overwatch shorts; he detailed: "We think of them as in seasons. That's how we [Blizzard Entertainment] talk about them internally. So our first season started with Recall and ended with The Last Bastion." In 2017, Kaplan stated that a debut for a second season was "making good progress," although the Infiltration short had premiered at BlizzCon 2016, between The Last Bastion and his comments. Kaplan also stated that after the animation team had produced so many shorts in 2016; as a result, the team opted to slow down to prevent burnout, explaining the limited number of shorts in 2017 and 2018.

== Release ==
Prior to Overwatch's release, Blizzard released the cinematic teasers We Are Overwatch and Are You With Us?, which featured voice-overs of the game's characters. In the latter, Winston briefly summarizes the Omnic Crisis and recall of Overwatch. Blizzard released their first of the original four animated shorts, Recall, in March 2016. While the PlayOverwatch YouTube channel uploaded the short on March 23, the Xbox YouTube channel premiered it on March 21. The events of Recall precede the events of the cinematic trailer.

Although Blizzard initially announced four animated shorts, a fifth short titled The Last Bastion was announced in August 2016. The short was debuted at Gamescom 2016 and simultaneously streamed on Blizzard.com on August 18. It was also released on the PlayOverwatch YouTube channel on the same day.

Following The Last Bastion, Blizzard continued to release animated cinematic shorts; the release of these shorts often coincided with new character additions to Overwatch, and the shorts often premiered at gaming conventions such as BlizzCon, Gamescom, or TwitchCon.

On November 1, 2019, at that year's BlizzCon event, Zero Hour premiered. The short functioned as announcement cinematic for Overwatch 2. Kiriko premiered on October 7, 2022, as part of TwitchCon and included a deaf child character as a nod to a deaf Overwatch player who developed American sign language gestures for each of the heroes in the game. The Kiriko short featured the song "BOW" by Japanese artist MFS.

Blizzard released Genesis, a three-part animated miniseries on YouTube, which premiered on July 6, 2023.

== Cinematic shorts ==
=== Overwatch (2014–2018) ===
==== Cinematic trailer (2014) ====
No. overall	No. in season	Title	Original release date	Viewers (millions)
1	1	"Overwatch Cinematic Trailer"	November 7, 2014	17.2
The cinematic's plot focused on two boys visiting the in-universe Overwatch museum where the history of the team is explained, when it then becomes a battle zone between Overwatch members Tracer and Winston, and Reaper and Widowmaker who are agents of Talon, a terrorist organization within the game.

==== Season 1 (2016) ====
No. overall	No. in season	Title	Original release date	Viewers (millions)
2	1	"Recall"	March 23, 2016 (Note: Recall was released onto the official PlayOverwatch YouTube account on March 23, 2016, but premiered two days earlier on the Xbox YouTube account.)	17.7 (Note: This approximated figure includes the 3.9 million views received by the Xbox upload, and the 13.8 million views received by the PlayOverwatch upload.)
The short focuses on the genetically engineered scientist and gorilla, Winston, who is seen recalling memories of his days in Overwatch, as well as his Horizon Lunar Colony upbringing. Winston then fights back against an attack on his Watchpoint: Gibraltar base from Talon, a terrorist organization opposed to Overwatch, who is seeking to eliminate former Overwatch members. Despite the passing of the Petras Act, legally putting an end to all Overwatch-related activities, Winston initiates a recall at the end of the short, in an effort to bring back Overwatch.
3	2	"Alive"	April 3, 2016 (Note: Alive was released onto the official PlayOverwatch YouTube account on April 5, 2016, but premiered two days earlier on the PlayStation YouTube account.)	19.4 (Note: This approximated figure includes the 5.2 million views received by the PlayStation upload, and the 14.2 million views received by the PlayOverwatch upload.)
The video centers on Widowmaker, while also featuring Tracer. The short is set in London's King's Row, which is also the setting for a map in the game. In the short, Widowmaker is featured on a rooftop plotting to assassinate Tekhartha Mondatta. Mondatta is the head of the Shambali, an in-universe group of omnics formed to bring peace between omnics and humans. Widowmaker is then confronted by Tracer, who engages in a rooftop battle with her; eventually, Tracer fails to protect Mondatta from assassination.
4	3	"Dragons"	May 16, 2016	42.8
In Overwatch lore, Genji had lived a playboy lifestyle prior to becoming an Overwatch agent. Genji, denying Hanzo's wishes to get more involved with their clan's criminal activity, was nearly killed by Hanzo. While Hanzo himself would be driven abandon their clan by this, what he did not know was Mercy would rescue Genji at the brink of death. Overwatch then offered to rebuild Genji's body in exchange for his help; he agreed and was rebuilt into a cyborg. He would leave Overwatch after completing his mission, drifting around the world, struggling with his cyborg body, and searching for meaning. The event covered in Dragons takes place after this, which is prior to the other three shorts, and slightly before the fall of Overwatch. The short uses elements of Japanese folklore to parallel the story of Genji and Hanzo's relationship; the two Japanese characters are brothers of the criminal Shimada Clan. In Dragons, Hanzo can be seen making his annual return to his home of Hanamura, a fictional Japanese city, to face the past he left behind there. Hanzo encounters the now cyborg Genji during his return, which leads to a battle between the two. The battle ends when Genji spares Hanzo's life and reveals his identity to him.
5	4	"Hero"	May 22, 2016	19.4
In Overwatch lore, Soldier: 76 continued being active after the disbanding of Overwatch and criminalization of Overwatch-like activities, aiming to go after everyone who conspired to bring Overwatch down. The Hero short illustrates this vigilantism as Soldier: 76 saves Alejandra, a young Mexican girl who is attacked by Los Muertos, an anti-omnic gang. Soldier: 76 was in Dorado, a fictional Mexican city, where he was investigating the illegal activities of the gang.
6	5	"The Last Bastion"	August 18, 2016	23.5
The short is set outside of Eichenwalde, the site of a critical Omnic Crisis battle and centers on Bastion, the last surviving Bastion unit who remained dormant for over a decade following the Omnic Crisis. Ben Dai, Overwatch's Project Director, stated that Bastion, "an artificial intelligence programmed to do one thing, and one thing only—to fight—comes face-to-face with a choice to alter his destiny." He is awoken by a bird, which leads him to investigate the natural beauty around him. The short includes flashbacks to the event, showing that Bastion units made up a majority of the Omnic combat force. Bastion then has moments in which he returns to his combative directive and begins shooting the environment around him. Ultimately, Bastion decides to walk away from a combat zone of the Omnic Crisis, opting to indulge in nature.

==== Season 2 (2016–2018) ====
No. overall	No. in season	Title	Original release date	Viewers (millions)
7	1	"Infiltration"	November 4, 2016	24.7
The short features Sombra ostensibly assisting Reaper and Widowmaker with infiltrating a Russian base, in order to assassinate Katya Volskaya. According to Sombra, Volskaya is "the most powerful woman in Russia." Volskaya pretends to defend the nation from the Omnics, but in reality makes deals to receive technology from this enemy. Using her hacking abilities, Sombra is able to secure a few moments to speak to Volskaya, promising to not expose her, in return for favors to fuel her own personal gain. Following this, she alerts Reaper that the mission to assassinate Volskaya failed, claiming she escaped. After the short fades to the Overwatch logo, Zarya is featured, speaking to Volskaya.
8	2	"Rise and Shine"	August 23, 2017	13.9
Centered on Mei's backstory, the short features her stationed at Overwatch's Antarctic eco-Watchpoint studying abnormal climate phenomena. A severe polar storm hits, and Mei and the other scientists decide to enter cryosleep to wait out the storm. When Mei awakens, she discovers that nine years have passed and her colleagues are all dead, their pods having malfunctioned during cryosleep. With the help of her robotic assistant Snowball, Mei works to get a signal out to let someone know of her survival and rescue her before she freezes to death, constructing an Endothermic Blaster in the process. She intercepts Winston's recall message and commits herself to the cause, beginning her journey with Snowball back to civilization.
9	3	"Honor and Glory"	November 3, 2017	23.8
The animation focuses on Reinhardt, showing him remembering his time as part of the Crusaders, when he helped to defend a German town from an army of Omnics under his commander, Balderich von Adler, whom had just been selected to join the Overwatch team. The Omnics proved to be a stronger force, and in order to give the other Crusaders time to evacuate the rest of the town, von Adler volunteered to stay back to hold off the Omnics as long as possible, telling Reinhardt to take his place in Overwatch once the battle is over.
10	4	"Shooting Star"	August 22, 2018	14.4
In the short, the Korean MEKA defense team, consisting of pro gamers like D.Va, are currently in downtime after fighting off an Omnic invasion of Busan, and at their main base, D.Va is repairing her MEKA with help from Daehyun, one of the team's mechanics that hopes to share the spotlight that the MEKA squad gets. He spots signs of a new Omnic invasion, much sooner than they had expected, and D.Va takes off alone to fight them. Though she is able to put most of the Omnics out of commission, one last one tears the gun arms off her suit, leaving her powerless. With the reactor core in her suit nearly overloaded, D.Va had Daehyun trigger the overload as she bails out, destroying the suit and the Omnic but keeping the city safe. D.Va is rescued and treated for her injuries, and once back at the MEKA base, thanks Daehyun for his help.
11	5	"Reunion"	November 2, 2018	18.0
The short centered on Cassidy, as well as Ashe, a newly introduced hero. Cassidy, having tipped off his old Deadlock Gang about the transit of a special crate near Route 66, waits at a nearby diner for them to blow up the bridge and derail the train to secure the package. Cassidy steps out, meeting his old gang who are securing the crate for transport. He and Ashe talk about their past when Cassidy was in the gang, but Cassidy states that all he wants now is the contents of the crate, Ashe and her gang can take everything else. This leads to a standoff, and when high noon hits, the two sides have a fire fight. Cassidy overpowers them, tying them up on a payload cart and sending it on its way while recovering the crate. Inside the crate is an inactive robot, which Cassidy slots in a small chip that awakens it. Cassidy welcomes the robot, named Echo, who has been asleep for a long time. Cassidy tells her that she is needed and that she needs to find Winston, while he rides off into the sunset on another mission.

=== Overwatch 2 (2019–present) ===
No. overall	No. in season	Title	Original release date	Viewers (millions)
12	1	"Zero Hour"	November 1, 2019	20.6
Overwatch, now led by Winston, Tracer, and Mei respond to a Null Sector attack in Paris.

No. overall	No. in season	Title	Original release date	Viewers (millions)
13	1	"The Wastelander"	June 16, 2022	5.1
The short featured Odessa "Dez" Stone's ascent to the throne of Junkertown, becoming the Junker Queen.
14	2	"Kiriko"	October 7, 2022	9.4
The animated short centered on the Overwatch 2 hero of the same name. The short shows Kiriko's relationship with her mother, her fighting the yakuza, and the aide she gives to a deaf child.
15	3	"Calling"	August 4, 2023 (in-game); August 7, 2023 (YouTube)	0.5 (Note: Calling was initially released in-game only on August 4, 2023, but premiered three days later on the official PlayOverwatch YouTube channel. Views in-game are not known, and views of unofficial uploads are not counted.)
CSIS Agent Noah Tremblay visits Vivian Chase, former Overwatch agent known by the callsign "Sojourn", in her home. He attempts to question her about her whereabouts the previous night, recalling his experiences then. She denies any knowledge or involvement, but Tremblay confronts her with evidence he found at the scene that points to her being there, undercover and in violation of the Petras act, despite the fact that the person suspected to be her saved Tremblay's life. Before he can make a decision about handcuffing her, however, Null Sector begins attacking Toronto outside. Sojourn immediately transforms her living room into a command center, using nearby communication channels to direct citizens to safety.
16	4	"A Great Day"	December 1, 2023	1.4
17	5	"Reign of Talon"	February 4, 2026	N/A

== Other animations ==
# Denotes origin story video or animated hero trailer
¤ Denotes promotional video
∞ Denotes crossover media
@ Denotes anime miniseries episode
⁕ Denotes other animated video

Viewership for Overwatch animated media
Short	Main character(s)	Release	Ref.
Soldier: 76 Origin Story #	Soldier: 76	July 7, 2015	
A Moment in Crime Special Report: "The Junkers" ⁕	Junkrat and Roadhog	September 21, 2015	
We Are Overwatch ¤	Various	December 18, 2015	
Are You With Us? ¤	Winston	May 2, 2016	
Ana Origin Story #	Ana	July 12, 2016	
Sombra Origin Story #	Sombra	November 4, 2016	
Orisa Origin Story #	Orisa	March 2, 2017	
King's Row Uprising Origin Story #	Tracer	April 11, 2017	
Hanamura Showdown ∞	Genji, Diablo, and D.Va	April 25, 2017 (Note: Uploaded as crossover promotional video for Heroes of the Storm 2.0.)	
Doomfist Origin Story #	Doomfist	July 6, 2017	
Junkertown: The Plan ⁕	Junkrat and Roadhog	August 21, 2017	
Moira Origin Story #	Moira	November 3, 2017	
Dragons of the Nexus ∞	Hanzo, Alexstrasza	November 3, 2017 (Note: Uploaded as crossover promotional video for Heroes of the Storm 2.0.)	
Brigitte Origin Story #	Brigitte	February 28, 2018	
Trace & Bake ¤	Tracer & Reaper	May 19, 2018 (Note: Uploaded as a promotional video celebrating the second anniversary of Overwatch's release.)	
Wrecking Ball Origin Story #	Wrecking Ball	June 28, 2018	
Ashe Origin Story #	Ashe	November 2, 2018	
Overwatch Lúcio-Oh's ⁕	Lúcio	November 2, 2018	
Cookiewatch ⁕	Tracer & Reaper	December 18, 2018	
Baptiste Origin Story #	Baptiste	February 25, 2019	
Sigma Origin Story #	Sigma	July 22, 2019	
Echo Origin Story #	Echo, Dr. Mina Liao	March 18, 2020	
Sojourn Origin Story #	Sojourn	April 13, 2022	
Junker Queen Origin Story #	Junker Queen	June 16, 2022	
Kiriko Origin Story #	Kiriko	September 20, 2022	
Ramattra Origin Story #	Ramattra	November 5, 2022	
Lifeweaver Origin Story #	Lifeweaver	April 8, 2023	
Genesis – Part One: Dawn @	Dr. Mina Liao	July 6, 2023	
Genesis – Part Two: Innocence @	Dr. Mina Liao	July 13, 2023	
Genesis – Part Three: Rebirth @	Dr. Mina Liao	July 20, 2023	
Illari Origin Story #	Illari	August 11, 2023	
"Perfect Night" by Le Sserafim ¤	Various	October 27, 2023	
Mauga Origin Story #	Mauga	November 3, 2023	
Venture's Adventures #	Venture	April 16, 2024	
Control #	Juno	August 21, 2024	
The Hunt Begins #	Freja	March 19, 2025	

== Reception ==
Media outlets often positively received the Overwatch animations, and in a broader sense the story as a whole. Various outlets including The Telegraph, The Mary Sue, and The Daily Beast have all likened Blizzard's animations to Pixar's films.

Mike Fahey of Kotaku expressed that he was also "charmed by [the] beautifully animated trailer." Nick Schager of The Daily Beast praised the cinematic teaser, which is also seen when the game is first loaded up, expressing that "the charisma of these avatars is established early on, in an introductory video featuring hyper-intelligent simian warrior Winston that establishes the game's Earth-under-siege sci-fi premise – and proves to be a tour-de-force of digital animation. It's no exaggeration to say that Winston feels like he's leapt out of a Pixar film (or a similarly gorgeous Disney effort like Big Hero 6)."

Jessica Lachenal of The Mary Sue praised the tone and music of the Recall short, writing "The short itself is so incredibly well done," adding "It's full of heart, and it's already got me invested in the featured character, Winston. I found myself getting a bit misty-eyed at his flashbacks, as well. Thanks, emotionally epic, dramatic score." Lachenal also wrote that the Dragons short was "filled with gorgeous animations and some pretty sweet action sequences." The Telegraph concurred, describing Dragons as a "beautiful, Pixar-esque" short. Writing about The Last Bastion, Nick Statt of The Verge stated "While other Overwatch shorts have done a stellar job providing world-building backstories, "The Last Bastion" — as it's called — is more emotional powerhouse than plot point delivery."

When discussing the shorts in general, Lachenal opined "[Blizzard has] a real knack for applying a fantastic cinematic tilt to these shorts, and every time I catch one, I find myself intrigued and —perhaps most of all —invested in the world that they're building. Gabe Gurwin of Digital Trends, while agreeing that the Blizzard released "a number of fantastic computer-animated short films," was critical of their decision to exclude the story from the game.

The Overwatch Announcement Cinematic won a People's Choice Webby Award in 2015 for Best Editing. The Last Bastion won the People's Choice 2017 Webby Award for Best Writing in the Film & Video category. That same year, the Webby Awards named the first season of animated shorts as an Honoree in the Animation (Branded) category.
