= Ashe (Overwatch) =

Fictional character in the 2016 video game Overwatch

Elizabeth Caledonia Ashe
- Overwatch character
- Ashe's appearance in Overwatch
- First game: Overwatch (2016)
- Created by: Jason Hill
- Designed by: Mio del Rosario (preliminary); JungAh Lee; Ben Zhang (equipment)
- Voiced by: Jennifer Hale

In-universe information
- Class: Damage
- Origin: United States
- Nationality: American

Elizabeth Caledonia "Calamity" Ashe is a character who appeared in the 2016 video game Overwatch, a Blizzard Entertainment–developed first-person hero shooter, and the resulting franchise. Commonly referred to as Ashe, she first appeared in the 2018 animated short Reunion, and was soon thereafter added as a playable character in the franchise's first game. Ashe is an American outlaw and leader of the Deadlock Gang, a band of arms-trafficking criminals. She does this alongside her sidekick B.O.B., a large mustachioed robot whose name stands for Big Omnic Butler. In all appearances, Ashe is voiced by Jennifer Hale, while B.O.B. communicates strictly through body language and eye movement.

Ashe's development was different from other playable characters for the game, conceived originally for the animated short by Jason Hill as a foil for the character Cassidy. However, after artwork was drawn by Mio del Rosario and JungAh Lee, the team took a liking to the character, as well as her sidekick B.O.B. Around the same time, project lead Geoff Goodman was interested in introducing a new playable character into the game, and seeing her lever action rifle took a liking to the idea. As a result, when the short was released, they announced her as a character for the game shortly afterward.

Ashe received mixed reception. While she was popular with many fans upon release, some drew issue with the lack of black female characters in the game, and saw Ashe as a disregard for those concerns. This was compounded when concept art revealed at one point in development it was considered to have her be a woman of color. Additional criticisms were raised about her body type being too standard for female video game characters, and the clash of her cowboy character against the game's science fiction background. However some sources noted her contrast to Cassidy as a positive, and praised her portrayal in literature related to the game's universe. B.O.B. himself was more warmly received, with some inquiring if he could be made into a playable character himself.

== Conception and development ==
Unlike Ashe, B.O.B. did not require changes after the initial draft, something Hill considered rare for Overwatch's development.

When developing Reunion, an animated short for the Overwatch franchise, project director Jason Hill wanted to explore the "Deadlock" gang the character Cassidy had previously belonged to. He approached storyboard artist Mio del Rosario with the concept of the leader being "female with this big brim hat, and this long duster, and a lever-action rifle". In addition, her bodyguard would be an omnic, a type of robot within the Overwatch universe, but Hill wanted it to look different from those normally shown to illustrate that they came in "should be able to come in all shapes and sizes" and make him appear large. Del Rosario presented a basic sketch of Ashe, B.O.B. and other members of her gang, drawing Ashe in the center as an older woman with sunken cheeks and sharp features. Hill upon seeing it recalls commenting "Yes, that's it, that's it. This invoked the feeling that I wanted", praising the emphasis on her commanding presence being drawn front and center, while her large mustached bodyguard loomed in the background. He found her particularly striking, and as storyboarding progressed she became more and more the focus of the short.

Concept artist JungAh Lee sketched several basic concepts, taking inspiration from biker gangs, vampire hunters, and cowboys, as well as the anime Trigun. While Hill felt it hit the mark he was going for, it didn't quite work as a character for Overwatch, describing it as "more of a gothic look and you would expect her to be hunting vampires or werewolves, or something like that", and upon stepping back realized that she resembled another character in the series, Reaper, in terms of silhouette and color palette. Hill suggested she try more freeform ideas with the design, and several others followed, including a woman of color in a brown duster Hill felt was too similar to Cassidy, a woman with a long red ponytail and spiked attire he felt was too punk, and a woman clad in white with a long flowing poncho he liked, but felt it made her resemble a superhero. At this time art director Arnold Tsang also weighed in, feeling that the combination of pale skin with white hair made her seem vampiric, and that the cowboy aesthetic overall belonged more to Cassidy, suggesting instead to emphasize her biker aesthetic. They started instead taking elements from her previous designs and working them into her finalized appearance, with a focus on giving her class with a menacing edge to set her apart from Cassidy. Artist Ben Zhang also helped develop tech concepts for her character, which the team felt solidified her better into Overwatch's setting. In addition, her hair was shortened, to help reduce workload and complications from animating long flowing hair. B.O.B.'s design on the other hand changed very little during development, with the team loving the idea of a "burly, mustached omnic in a bowler hat".

At this time, project lead Geoff Goodman was considering another playable character to add to the game, wanting to implement a weapon focused character, in contrast to the previously released Sombra and Doomfist who he stated were ability focused. Upon seeing the early storyboards for Reunion they were impressed with Ashe's design, and felt her weapon, a lever-action rifle, would be fun to make for the game. Hill was receptive to the idea, stating he had originally only intended to include Ashe in possibly future comic books related to the game. The team immediately went to work on the character, with several designers submitting concepts for her implementation into the game. The development team was also adamant on implementing B.O.B. in some fashion alongside her, with both Goodman and former Overwatch designer Adrian Finol comparing notes on the best means to do so. B.O.B.'s implementation however, caused some difficulties for the development team, to the point they almost considered not implementing B.O.B. or Ashe herself.

=== Design ===
Ashe stands 5 feet 6 inches tall, and is a woman with red eyes and white hair cut into an asymmetrical bob cut, covered by a black wide-brim cowboy hat. She wears a white long sleeve shirt with the sleeves rolled up, a red tie, and a black long tailed vest with her gang's logo on the back. Her gray pants are covered by leather armor from the upper thighs to the knees, with metal knee guards linking them to her black boots. Her right arm is covered by armor to the wrist, while her left forearm has a visible gray tattoo of her gang's logo along its length, with fingerless gloves covering both hands. In addition, a pouch is strapped to her right thigh, while an angled belt holds grenades at her right hip. Her weapons consist of a gold engraved lever action rifle with a notched stock, and a sawed-off double barrel shotgun. Her design was changed slightly for Overwatch 2, giving her a full opened jacket with red accents and an armored vest underneath.

While B.O.B.'s height has never been stated by the developers, he stands significantly taller than Ashe. He appears as a large humanoid robot with a muscular physique, two small green eyes on his face, and an additional smaller pair of green lights further up his head. He also has a black handlebar mustache that goes around the sides of his head. His outfit consists of an open sleeveless biker jacket with a fur collar, a small bowler hat atop his head, grey pants with leather chaps, black boots, metal pads covering his knees, and the gang's logo drawn on his left bicep. B.O.B. has three double barrel guns hidden in each arm, which deploy outward to the side when needed.

Like other Overwatch characters, Ashe received skins, unlockable cosmetic items to change her in-game appearance. However, B.O.B.'s implementation forced the team to develop outfits for him that worked alongside Ashe's. Arnold Tsang particularly enjoyed this aspect, noting that while some concepts would not work for Ashe, they were able to work those onto B.O.B. instead. Two notable skins for the duo include the "Mobster" and "Safari" sets, which were meant to tie into their thematic elements, emphasizing Ashe's imagery of her as the leader with B.O.B. as her lackey, while also sticking to themes that would suit the vigilante aspect of her character. In contrast, her "Socialite" skin was designed to emphasize her rich upbringing. B.O.B. is dressed as a butler, and her weapons are given an art deco appearance.

== In video games and film ==
Elizabeth Caledonia "Calamity" Ashe, typically referred to by her last name, was introduced in November 2018 to the first-person shooter Overwatch. Born into a wealthy family from the Southern United States, she was largely neglected by her parents and left in the care of their large butler, B.O.B., a type of robot called an "omnic" whose name stands for "Big Omnic Butler". After meeting Cole Cassidy and doing a string of petty crimes together, she decides to form the arms-trafficking Deadlock Gang with him and B.O.B., though at one point Cassidy was forced to leave. As they grow in prominence, she convinces other gangs in the American Southwest to either collaborate or not interfere with each other, and becomes a legendary outlaw through her increasingly elaborate crimes. She and B.O.B. both appear in Overwatch 2, where it is revealed she has allied her gang with the terrorist organization Talon.

Prior to her in-game appearance, Ashe was showcased in the animated short Reunion, part of a series of Overwatch animated shorts. In it, Ashe and her gang cause a train crash, and begin looting the contents which include multiple grenades and a large white egg-shaped crate. Cassidy, now a member of global peacekeeping task force Overwatch, shows up and demands just the white crate. After looking inside Ashe decides to keep it and a conflict ensues, with Cassidy using the discarded grenades to incapacitate Ashe and her gang and dismantle B.O.B. He ties them up and sends them off, with Ashe promising revenge once she repairs B.O.B.

In all appearances, Ashe is voiced by Jennifer Hale, who Hill had originally wanted for the role and was pleased with her portrayal after auditioning several voice actresses. Hill encouraged her to ad-lib and improvise dialogue for the original short. As B.O.B. does not speak, the character communicates via his body language and eye movement.

=== Gameplay ===
In Overwatch, Ashe is classified as a Damage-class character, designed to provide a more offensive role in team compositions. Her main weapon is a lever-action repeating rifle that can be used for short-ranged quick fire, or the player can aim down the weapon's sights for long shots. Unlike other weapons in the game, her rifle is not loaded by a magazine but instead with each individual bullet until full. This reload process can be interrupted to quickly fire the weapon again with the reduced ammo quantity, and was intended to help offset the rapid fire nature of the weapon when not aiming down its sights. When developing her gameplay, Call of Duty series development studios Treyarch and Infinity Ward both offered insight on refining Ashe's behavior when aiming down the sights of her gun. In Overwatch 2, Ashe temporarily reduces the amount of healing an enemy receives when she damages them, due to a new passive ability given to all Damage-class characters.

Ashe also has several abilities that require activation, though the first two have a "cooldown" period after use and are unable to be used again during that duration. "Coach Gun" fires a shotgun in front of her, pushing enemies away and herself backward for added mobility. "Dynamite" throws a bomb that explodes after a short duration but can also be shot to make it explode instantly, causing splash damage to anyone within the blast radius. Lastly her 'ultimate' ability, called "B.O.B.", requires to be charged before use. The ability charges slowly during the course of gameplay, and can be charged faster through damage dealt to the enemy team. Once full the ability can be activated to summon B.O.B. to help, who will use melee attacks and his arm cannon while controlled by the game's AI, and remains until his health is depleted. B.O.B. is treated as a player character by the game in terms of interactions, and as a result can be healed, receive boosts from allies, and take and contest capture points in certain game modes by himself.

== In literature ==
Her story is expanded upon in the novel Deadlock Rebels by Lyndsay Ely, detailing the events prior to the founding of her gang. Ashe's family is established as owning a weapons manufacturing company, and made a fortune selling arms during the "Omnic Crisis", an event in Overwatch's lore where the omnic robots rebelled. During this time B.O.B. vanished, returning after the war with newfound sentience to care for Ashe. However the war's end also slowed demand for weapons and the company closed local plants, causing tension with the community. On her way to her school's graduation, Ashe is attacked by two boys, who later claim she attacked them. The town sheriff, who also hates her parents, arrests her. While in jail she meets Cassidy, who had been arrested for assisting a friend, and bonds with him. Her parents pay her bail and, furious about how the altercation made them look, plan to disown her in three months on her eighteenth birthday. Angered, she decides to sell the company's assets on the black market, enlisting Cassidy to this end. However, the initial attempt is botched, and they are saved by B.O.B. Realizing they'll need a hacker and someone that can build explosives they recruit two more people, Frankie and Julian, accordingly.

When the three do their second heist together, it goes smoother and they make a handsome profit. They perform several heists over the next few months, with Ashe hiding her face and using the moniker "Calamity" to keep her identity secret. However, a rival gang called the Diamondbacks and their leader Marco threaten her to stop acting in their territory. Ashe agrees, but secretly tells her gang they were going to plan a big heist. However, bad information causes them to turn up empty handed. On her 18th birthday, while the gang is resting at her mansion, the Diamondbacks attacked with molotov cocktails and kidnapped Cassidy. Her parents also return, claiming that they had not actually planned to disown her, but also aware that the heists were her doing, revealing the failed heist was bait. Her mother orders her arrest.

While in jail, she convinces the sheriff to let her pay her bail as a means to strike back at her parents. He agreed with the idea, and it took almost all the gang's shared money to pay, with B.O.B. waiting for her. Retrieving her family's rifle from her former home, she returns to the gang and asks them to help rescue Cassidy, though Frankie and Julian are wary about taking on the Diamondbacks. Ashe proceeds on her own, but they offer some assistance. However, Julian betrays her and joins the Diamondbacks before she is captured by Marco. Frankie helps Ashe escape, and she arrives with B.O.B. to help. Marco's second in command, feeling Marco is bad for the gang, helps Ashe and company find Cassidy. They capture Marco after she convinces the rest of the Diamondbacks to join with her, and she sends him and Julian in a shipping container to the sheriff. In the epilogue she and Cassidy finally name their gang the Deadlock Rebels before heading off to start another heist.

Ashe and B.O.B. return in the story "Luck of the Draw" in the novel Heroes Ascendant, a collection of short stories set in the Overwatch universe. Written by Ely, the story is set after the events of the game's "Zero Hour" storyline. During a meeting with a rival gang in Las Vegas, the city is attacked by Null Sector, a group of militant omnics claiming to "liberate" them. As Null Sector attempts to capture B.O.B., the pair help each other escape the city and eventually return home. They later appear in the comic Crossroads alongside the rest of the Deadlock Gang, robbing Overwatch's base in Grand Mesa. Cassidy intervenes, and he and Ashe argue, with Cassidy believing Ashe had abandoned him after his arrest leading him to being recuited into Overwatch by Gabriel Reyes, while Ashe states she searched for him to no avail. Deadlock escapes, with the heist revealed to be a distraction from a more covert heist by the terrorist group Talon.

== Promotion and reception ==
An unused design of Ashe as a woman of color raised questions about Blizzard's commitment to diversity.

Ashe was unveiled at Blizzcon 2018 through several short videos, and to further promote the character, Blizzard Entertainment commissioned Henchmen Studios to have a cosplayer portraying the character present at the convention to take photos with guests. Various merchandise featuring the character's likeness was also released, including a bandana and a messenger bag. Two figures were also released: a Funko Pop figure and a Good Smile Company Nendoroid figure that featured B.O.B.'s head as an accessory.

Described by Elijah Beahm of The Escapist as "basically a gun-toting Lorelai Gilmore", the character has received mixed reception. Sites such as Polygon noted she was immediately popular with fan artists. Additionally, searches for Overwatch pornography on Pornhub doubled after the character was released in the game, with Dustin Bailey of PCGamesN noting that fanmade porn of the character had been released on the website less than an hour after her debut. Once she was made available, her gameplay was well received by players. B.O.B. was also warmly received, described as an incredible addition to the game that "stole the show" during Ashe's reveal at Blizzcon 2018, with fans quickly wanting him playable as a standalone character according to Kyle LeClair of Hardcore Gamer.

However, some fans and critics voiced concerns regarding the character, notably in the context of character diversity, with Jay Castello of The Guardian in particular stating they got a sense that "while inclusivity is one thing to consider when creating a new hero, it's not always a priority." Nathan Grayson of Kotaku noted that while fan reaction to Ashe's original reveal was positive, once excitement died down fans lamented in particular that she was a "another skinny white woman" at a point in Overwatch's development where it lacked any playable black female characters. This was further compounded when concept art revealed she was originally a woman of color. Some fans drawing Ashe as a black woman as a form of protest, and Grayson himself also questioned why Ashe could not have been black. Nico Deyo of Fanbyte further criticized the "pristineness" of her character that seemed to permeate most female characters in Overwatch, which she felt clashed with her cowboy/outlaw aesthetic against the game's science fiction setting. She also felt that a "rich white girl playing criminal dress-up" was too common trope in media and "not any more progressive just because she is a woman". She lamented that while the character should have been a celebrated addition to the game, instead she felt like a possible decline in the quality of Blizzard's creative process.

In contrast, TheGamer's editor-in-chief Stacey Henley voiced her approval of the character, calling her wry and romantic while noting her own affinity for westerns and the aesthetic of cowboy stories, adding that "Ashe leans into these tropes brilliantly". Meanwhile, Cass Marshall of Polygon argued that her appearance was meant to be a counter to Cassidy's, and while her original design featured heavy amounts of red and brown, they felt it shifted over to "sharp, distinct whites" to this end. In addition they pointed out that, unlike other characters, she was made by the cinematics team for Overwatch and not planned to be a playable character until the development team took a liking to her which also affected decisions regarding her character development. Marshall further called Ashe a "victim of the game's success", and noted that while some were happy to have a character that returned to a classic Overwatch feel, others upset about her release were not necessarily wrong, adding "there are cases where [Blizzard] can't please everyone, and Ashe is the perfect case study of where that divide can deepen." Beahm stated that while he felt her debut for the game itself was bland, her portrayal in Deadlock Rebels added considerable nuance to her. Describing her as an "imposing, charismatic leader" in the characterization, he enjoyed her empathy towards her gang and found it made her endearing despite her portrayal as an antagonist, and ultimately called it "an inspired evolution of Ashe".
