= Sojourn (Overwatch) =

Fictional character in the 2016 video game Overwatch

- Overwatch character
- Sojourn's appearance in Overwatch.
- First appearance: Overwatch (2023)
- Created by: Arnold Tsang
- Voiced by: Cherise Boothe

In-universe information
- Class: Damage
- Nationality: Canadian

Sojourn is the codename of Vivian Chase, a character in the Overwatch media franchise. She first appeared in Overwatch 2, a first-person hero shooter video game developed by Blizzard Entertainment. Initially designed by Arnold Tsang in 2014, Sojourn is a "Damage"-class hero that uses cybernetic enhancements to handle the recoil of her primary weapon; a railgun. In the franchise's lore, she is a Canadian soldier who serves at the rank of captain within the Overwatch team, previously working with Jack Morrison during the Omnic War and commanded agents or provided long-range cover. She is voiced by Cherise Boothe.

Sojourn garnered mixed reception upon her inclusion, with critics praising her cybernetic design and representation of afro-textured hair, whilst others critiquing lack of uniqueness and lore in-game. Particular scrutiny was directed towards Sojourn as a representation of black female in videos, with critics deriding her inclusion as disappointing and bare-minimum; stemming from a long tracked history of criticism directed at Blizzard for the lack of black women representation in the franchise.

== Conception and development ==
According to game direct Jeff Kaplan, Sojourn had been a character in development for the game since Overwatch's inception around the same time as Wrecking Ball, around 2014, but did not say at the time whether she will be released as a playable character. According to lead hero designer Geoff Goodman, one difficulty they had in tuning Sojourn's kit was her railgun, as effectively it was similar in capabilities to Widowmaker's sniper rifle but without the cooldown making it overpowered, and eventually found a means to balance these factors.

== Appearances ==
Sojourn, real name Vivian Chase, is a Canadian soldier who serves as a captain within the Overwatch team. Prior to her introduction as a hero to arrive with Overwatch 2, she had only been seen through communication channels within the game, specifically serving as the mission commander for the "Storm Rising" co-operative event, or in the animated media, such as the short Recall. According to lore, Sojourn had worked with Overwatch commander Jack Morrison during the Omnic War, which led to her joining with Overwatch, where she either commanded agents or provided long-range cover for field teams.

=== Gameplay ===
She has cybernetic implants in her head, as well as a cybernetic arm that transforms into a disruptor cannon. Her carried weapon is a prototype railgun, which she is able to handle the increased recoil of due to her cybernetics. Her primary weapon is a machine gun that build up energy over time, which then can be unleashed as a railgun shot through its secondary fire. She can launch an area-of-effect Disruptor Shot that traps and drains enemies while building her railgun energy. She can perform a Power Slide that can be used to finish into a high jump. Her Ultimate is Overclock which continually recharges her railgun and makes its shots piercing.

== Critical reception ==
Sojourn upon release was met with mixed reception. Asif Khan of ShackNews felt she represented Blizzard's message of inclusion regarding the game, and further called her "truly a win for representation of minorities in video games". Isaiah Colbert of Kotaku praised her both her gameplay and design aesthetics, particularly appreciating her "sleek cybernetic design and actual Black hair texture is superb". Ash Parrish for The Verge also appreciate the attention to detail with her hair, describing her as "the best hair texture heretofore unseen in other games that feature Black hair" and praised that the development team recognized such was important to the identity of black characters. In contrast, Noelle Warner of Destructoid cited her as an example of how Overwatch 2's character design had deviated too far from the original game's straightforward nature where a character's archetype could be ascertained at a glance. By comparison, she felt she was less distinct even in terms of gameplay, and while her lore was "as complex and fleshed-out" as the rest of the cast, it was only fully explored in media outside of the game.

Prior to the character's release, the lack of a black female character in Overwatch's playable cast became a heavily discussed issue, and a point of criticism towards other released characters after her reveal. Similar complaints raised by Imogen Mellor for PCGamesN, who felt that Sojourn's tease for Overwatch 2 felt like "a shiny bauble" dangled in front of players to generate interest for the game, which at the time had now determined release date. She additionally took issue with Kaplan's statements about being unable to represent everyone on the planet, feeling it came across as a reason to not represent black women, a large demographic of video game players. Elaborating further, she felt that Kaplan's statement to her came across with the implication that Sojourn as a character was less there to represent such people, but more to represent the game's cast due to his emphasis on her importance in the story. While Mellor noted that it could be seen as unfair to hold Overwatch to particularly high standards, she countered that their stated commitment to diversity justified them, and felt Blizzard should re-examine its character development process.

Journalist Brittany Gonzales in an article for Polygon stressed how she considered Sojourn significant important due to the lack of black female characters in video games overall. While she acknowledged the existence of the character Efi and how important it was to see a woman in STEM fields, Efi was a supplemental character to that of Orisa, her playable counterpart and a robot she had rebuilt. By comparison, Sojourn as a fully playable character, and left them both intrigued on how they may work in-game and hopeful they would be a character black women could be inspired by. However, in a later article for eSports website Hotspawn, Gonzales stated she had been swept up in the "hype of being represented", and expressed disappointment. In retrospect, to her Sojourn felt like the bare minimum the company could do in terms of supporting black women, and represented what she perceived as Blizzard's shortcomings towards them.

Ana Valens writing for The Mary Sue considered Sojourn one of the best female characters in Overwatch due to her presence in the game's story and how her appearance illustrated her as experienced, but also bemoaned how long it took for the character to be introduced into the game. Valens additionally took issue with the manner the character was introduced, with her reveal for Overwatch 2 feeling more like a marketing strategy for a still popular game, but also that the reveal was done on the same day that Blizzard Entertainment was sued by the California state government for the mistreatment of their employees. She felt that while it was great to finally be able to play as Sojourn, the context around her was " painful and awkward", and yet another sign of how the company overall needed to change.
