= Jeffrey Kaplan =

Jeffrey Kaplan may refer to:

- Jeffrey Kaplan (historian) (1954–2025), American historian
- Jeff Kaplan, American video game designer
