= Soldier: 76 =

Fictional character from Overwatch video game

- Overwatch character
- Soldier: 76's appearance in Overwatch
- First appearance: Overwatch (2016)
- Created by: Chris Metzen
- Designed by: Arnold Tsang; Ben Zhang (rifle)
- Voiced by: Fred Tatasciore

In-universe information
- Class: Damage
- Nationality: American

Soldier: 76 is the codename of John Francis "Jack" Morrison, a character who first appeared in the 2016 video game Overwatch, a Blizzard Entertainment–developed first-person hero shooter, and the resulting franchise. In the games, Jack is an American super soldier-turned-vigilante and a founding member of the game's titular organization. Designed to appeal to newcomer players, Soldier: 76 wears a visor on top of his facemask and carries an experimental rifle. Soldier: 76 originated as a comic book concept conceived by former Blizzard employee Chris Metzen in the early 2000s, and is later modified and repurposed for inclusion in Overwatch. A short story published by Blizzard in January 2019 details his past relationship with his same-sex domestic partner.

Soldier: 76 was a highly popular choice for players during the early years of the first game. The reveal that Soldier: 76 is an openly gay man has been met with a generally positive reception from players, though some commentators have expressed their concerns and doubt about the sincerity of the developers as well as the player community for inclusivity.

== Conception and development ==
When Blizzard Entertainment began developing Overwatch, they wanted to include a character that could fulfill two roles: someone that could "function as a classic soldier" that players of first-person shooters would find familiar, while also being a character that fleshed out the game's backstory. Veteran Blizzard entertainment developer Chris Metzen offered a character he had developed prior who he felt would fit both the story and gameplay needs. Soldier: 76 was a character he had developed for the Digital Webbing Presents comic anthology, presented as a masked soldier who finds America ravaged by a second civil war and fights to restore the American dream.

Metzen had conceived of the Soldier: 76 character concept in the 1990s. He described him as a fusion of various characters he liked as a child, and as a "grim, driven, lonely" character archetype. While the name was meant to reference the year 1776 as a "ghost of patriotism", he envisioned the character as one without a country and an ambiguous war. Meanwhile, the character's name, John Francis "Jack" Morrison, references John Wayne's real name, Marion Morrison. Game director Jeff Kaplan liked the idea of the character, feeling it fit the "fallen soldier" character they were looking for, and the development team began integrating him into the game as the lynchpin for its story.

When adapting Metzen's original concept, they modified his weapons, devices, and armor to better fit the level of technology in Overwatch. The redesign was overseen by Arnold Tsang with David Zhang creating the design for his weapon. Early versions of the character had his face exposed, however the development team wanted the character to be a mysterious vigilante. As a result, a face mask was implemented into his design with the addition of a visor that would later become integral to his gameplay. Several ideas were considered for his appearance, including a heavy soldier clad in either red or blue armor, before going with a design that resembled the original's concept's jacketed appearance.

=== Design ===
Soldier: 76 stands 6 feet 1 inch (185 cm) tall, and has short white hair atop his head, while a scar traveled diagonally down his face starting from the left side of his forehead. His outfit consists of grey pants with armored greaves and boots, and a black, blue, and white jacket that has red highlights. The jacket has an armor plate on each shoulder, and a large stylized "76" on the back. He wears gloves with red armor plating, and an armored face mask with integrated horizontal visor that leaves his head exposed from the forehead up. He has two pouches strapped to each shoulder via a harness, canisters strapped to his left arm, and a holster that features additional canisters and a sidearm on his right hip.

In Overwatch 2, his outfit saw minimal changes, primarily replacing his jacket with an opened one while the armor plating was slightly changed. His mask on the other hand was removed save for the visor, now showing him with a full beard. Like other Overwatch characters, he received skins, unlockable cosmetic items to change his in-game appearance. When developing them, they wanted to do ideas referencing the 1970s. However, the team debated on how to best represent the era, resulting in two different concepts. "Daredevil: 76" is a caped stars and stripes-patterned outfit with a motorcycle helmet based off daredevil stunt drivers, while "Commando: 76" was a military-themed outfit showing several scars on his face and utilizing a jungle camouflage pattern.

== Appearances ==
Jack Morrison was born in rural Indiana, and enlisted in the United States military when he was eighteen. His bravery and work ethic earned him the attention of the "soldier enhancement program", and he later joined the Overwatch organization alongside his friend Gabriel Reyes. His contributions to its success in ending the Omnic Crisis led to his being granted command of the task force, leading to a rift between him and Reyes. As Overwatch came under worldwide scrutiny due to allegations of corruption, the tensions between the two men came to outright conflict, resulting in the destruction of Overwatch headquarters. Morrison was believed to have been killed in the explosion, and was reportedly buried at Arlington National Cemetery.

Five years later, however, Morrison resurfaced as the vigilante "Soldier: 76", becoming the focus of an international manhunt following a series of attacks against former Overwatch facilities, stealing weapons and advanced technologies. He wages a personal war to discover the truth behind the events that led to the fall of Overwatch. Reyes himself also resurfaced as an operative for the Talon organization, having assumed the identity of a notorious mercenary and terrorist known as "the Reaper".

Soldier: 76 appears in an animated short titled "Hero", which premiered during the final Overwatch season for 2016, and as an announcer for the Overwatch Year of the Pig promotional event in 2019.

In the "Bastet" short story released by Blizzard in January 2019, it is revealed that Morrison had a past relationship with a man named Vincent prior to his tenure in Overwatch. In 2026, Soldier: 76 was one of several characters included in Overwatch Rush, a mobile game developed by Blizzard.

Soldier: 76 is voiced by Fred Tatasciore.

=== Gameplay ===
In Overwatch, Soldier: 76 is classified as a Damage-class character, designed to provide a more offensive role in team compositions. His main weapon is a Heavy Pulse Rifle, a rapid-fire weapon with high vertical recoil. He can additionally use his "Sprint" ability to move forward quickly. While it can be used indefinitely, once the player cancels use of the sprint there is a brief window where weapons and abilities cannot be used.

In addition, he has two abilities that require activation, though have a "cooldown" period after use and are unable to be used again during that duration. "Helix Rockets" fires a volley of explosives that cause knockback, though may be destroyed or deflected by some enemy skills. "Biotic Field" meanwhile places an area-of-effect healing item on the ground for a period of time, restoring health to all those within its range. Lastly his Ultimate ability, "Tactical Visor", needs to be charged before use. The ability charges slowly during the course of gameplay, and can be charged faster through damage dealt to the enemy team. Once full, the ability can be activated to show a head-up display on the screen for period of time that allows his rifle to automatically track enemies.

== Promotion and reception ==
To promote Overwatch and the character, Blizzard Entertainment released a cosplay guide and promotional images themed around holidays. Various merchandise including Nendoroid depicting Soldier: 76 has been made. In June 2019, Nerf made a Soldier: 76 blaster toy. In May 2020, Soldier: 76 was announced as the tenth entry in Good Smile Company's figma line for Overwatch.

Soldier: 76 was the most popular offense character during the game's open beta. Abe Stein from Kill Screen thought of Soldier: 76 as the "boring nationalist dude-bro to emphasize the diversity and uniqueness among the rest of the cast", an accessible character serving as a standard for which all other characters are measured against. Dave Smith from Business Insider commented on SpaceX CEO Elon Musk's disclosure that he uses Soldier: 76 as his main character in Overwatch games in early 2017, which he interpreted as part of the character's ease of use and widespread appeal as a "solid, well-rounded character in a super-popular online multiplayer game". In an article published in October 2020, Imogen Mellor from PCGamesN rated Soldier: 76 as one of the ideal choices for beginner players of Overwatch.

The character has since become a popular subject for fan art, with many fans depicting him as a father figure for other Overwatch characters. Following the release of a teaser trailer for Fallout 76, fans began sharing in-jokes and fan art which references the digits in the character's codename and the then-upcoming game's title as well as the character's crossover potential. Connor Sheridan of GamesRadar considered Soldier: 76, together with Tracer and Winston, to be the "three most iconic Overwatch characters".

Various video game media outlets noted that the revelation of Soldier: 76's sexual orientation through the "Bastet" story in early 2019 was generally well received by the game's player base. However, his in-game pick rate did suffer a drop following the story's publication. A "significant minority" of players who stopped picking Soldier attributed this to harassment, in the form of homophobic slurs, they received while playing the character.

While several critics lauded the inclusion of another LGBT character in Overwatch after Tracer, some interpreted the manner in which the revelation was delivered to be a calculated public relations tactic, as the depiction of the character's sexuality is relegated to an aspect of world-building lore that they believe only a minority of players would be aware of. Matt Kim from USGamer drew an analogy to British author J.K. Rowling's method of revealing the sexuality of the Harry Potter character Albus Dumbledore, which he described as abrupt and lacked any meaningful context.

Writing for Polygon, Kenneth Shepard noted that the revelation of Soldier: 76 as a gay man got him interested in playing Overwatch, but expressed disappointment at his personal experiences when playing as the character, in particular the hostile reactions from other players to an in-game cosmetic item he frequently used, which explicitly references the character's relationship with Vincent. Shepard, who is openly gay, said the promotion of Soldier: 76's past in the game's lore "feels more like a trap than an honest invitation", and criticized Blizzard for not being "brave enough to let the character be who he is in the game itself", and that they have passively enabled the conditions of a toxic environment that makes certain players like him feel threatened and harassed. Jade King from TheGamer expressed hope that Blizzard will build upon goodwill generated from the first game's queer representation and treat Soldier: 76 and Tracer, its most important LGBT characters, with greater respect for the upcoming Overwatch 2.
