= Kiriko (Overwatch) =

Overwatch 2 character

Kiriko Kamori
- Overwatch character
- Kiriko in Overwatch 2
- First appearance: Overwatch 2 (2023)
- Voiced by: Sally Amaki

In-universe information
- Class: Support
- Origin: Japan
- Nationality: Japanese

Kiriko Kamori (/kiːriːkoʊ/) is a character in the Overwatch media franchise. Her first appearance was in Overwatch 2, a 2023 first-person hero shooter developed by Blizzard Entertainment. Kiriko's character design and gameplay mechanics draw from the imagery found in Japanese folklore and Shinto folk religion. In the game's lore, her mother trained her to be a ninja, while her grandmother taught her about spirituality and her ancestry. Combining her two matriarchal influences, Kiriko carries the power of a kitsune, which she uses to protect her native Kanezaka, a fictional Japanese city.

She was the first playable Overwatch character announced following the end of Overwatch 2's beta testing period, as well as the first character made available through a battle pass unlock. Blizzard's decision to make Kiriko and all future playable heroes locked behind a battle pass system was met with backlash and criticism from the game's player base; in April 2024, the decision was reversed, making all heroes, including Kiriko and everyone released after her, become available for free.

Kiriko initially received positive reception upon her release. However, she was the subject of continuously receiving skins nearly every limited time in-game event. Players and critics also stated her personality to be "arrogant" and "rude" and her lore was making her a "self-insert" to Genji and Hanzo's story. As a result starting in 2025, the character's overall reception has changed to become mixed to negative.

== Development and design ==
In December 2020, Blizzard announced Kanezaka, a fictional Japanese city, would be added to the original Overwatch game as a Deathmatch map. The following month, Blizzard published fictional correspondence written by Asa Yamagami, a woman from Kanezaka. Directed toward her kidnapped husband Toshiro, Asa's letter details how the Hashimoto Clan are negatively influencing Kanezaka. The letter also mentions the Yamagamis' daughter receiving blades as a gift from Toshiro, which led some players to speculate that their daughter would be added as a playable character.

During the Microsoft and Bethesda showcase in June 2022, Blizzard presented a release date trailer for Overwatch 2. A fox-themed hero was teased during the trailer. The second beta period of Overwatch 2 ended with a cryptic message that, when decoded, translated to "What does the fox say?" Rumors of a "fox girl" character named "Kimiko" began to spread online. They would permeate through September, leading Overwatch commercial leader Jon Spector to dismiss the rumors, calling them fake. Shortly after, a YouTube video of an unfinished cinematic featuring the character was leaked. In the leaked short, a gang appears at Kiriko's home with a title card labeled "Hashimoto". Ultimately, Blizzard officially announced Kiriko as a playable hero character at the Tokyo Games Show on September 15. At the event, Blizzard showcased a trailer highlighting Kiriko's gameplay mechanics. The sounds of SaveAFox Rescue founder Mikayla Raines' foxes were used when designing Kiriko; Overwatch 2 players later paid tribute to Raines following her death in June 2025.

When she was officially released for play, Kiriko became the first support character added to Overwatch's playable roster in over three years. Sally Amaki provides the voice for Kiriko; while experienced in singing and anime voice acting, Amaki's work on Kiriko was her first foray into video game voice-over. The character's appearances on the Overwatch 2 menu screen and in her 2022 animated short are accompanied by the song "BOW" by Japanese rapper MFS. Scott Duwe of Dot Esports wrote that the song was noted by journalists during the game's early press review period and opined, "the tune is perfectly fitting for Kiriko, matching her youthful exuberance with a fiery beat underneath Japanese rap lyricism."

=== Gameplay and art ===
Undergoing various incarnations "for about four years" prior to the release of Overwatch 2, Kiriko's design originated from concept art intended for the game's player vs. environment (PvE) mode. The game's development team originally conceived her as an enemy unit type and Aaron Tsang, the game's character art director, drew "a whole bunch of ninjas [that] could potentially be enemies." After intrigued by her streetwear-sporting design, Blizzard attempted to convert her into a playable character. Kiriko's original design saw her wield a "massive, fidget spinner-inspired throwing star" and donned a "somewhat more traditional ninjalike appearance". This design was later merged with the "traditional dress of a miko, a Shinto shrine maiden, and modern streetwear aesthetics." Meanwhile, her "comically oversized shuriken that acted liked a yo-yo or boomerang," would be repurposed for Junker Queen, another Overwatch 2 launch character.

Kiriko's abilities are heavily influenced by spiritual objects associated with Shintoism, such as ofuda and suzu. To heal her teammates, Kiriko uses ofuda, or paper talismans which protect their wielder. She also wields kunai, which are used in her secondary fire to damage opponents. The development team experimented with a healing shotgun for Kiriko's weapon, before settling on ofuda to lean more toward a spiritual aesthetic, rather than magical tropes, which they aimed to avoid. The team also scrapped early versions of her kit that saw her as a "trickster hero", including smoke bombs and a "ninja shadow clone ability". Ultimately, however, the development team aimed to develop Kiriko with the intention of incentivizing damage role players to try playing the support role instead.

In contrast to the 6v6 dynamic employed in the original Overwatch, Kiriko was designed with the 5v5 structure found in Overwatch 2 in mind. Additionally, Overwatch 2 characters are "harder to play" than those in the original game, with Kiriko being "perhaps one of the most complex, and hard-to-master supports in the game," according to TechRadar.

Qiu Fang, lead concept artist on Overwatch 2, described her as a "battle healer". Her mobility, particularly for a healer, is notable, although her main in-game role is to heal and protect allies. Her speed is comparable to that of Genji's and Tracer's, while her healing output is on par with Mercy and Moira. Due to the combination of her healing role and her fast speed, she is able to jump in and out of combat quickly, with Fang stating "not a sit-back-and-heal type of hero". According to Blizzard associate narrative designer Kyungseo Min, Kiriko's design was heavily inspired by Genji. An initial question posed by the game's development team while designing Kiriko was "How can we create a support hero that DPS players [who] like Genji would enjoy playing?" Additionally, the kunai featured as part of Kiriko's kit were initially designed for Genji's, before they were ultimately swapped out of his kit in favor of shuriken. Kiriko's ability to deal considerable damage was part of the development team's aim to make their support characters more "survivable" and to remove "hard counters". Game director Aaron Keller stated, "we're trying to take some of those really hard rock, paper, scissors interactions out of the game, and [replace] them with more player choice."

Much has been written about Kiriko's buggy status in-game, with Blizzard making several post-release patch updates addressing such bugs. Nevertheless, some players found that the addressed bugs related to her Swift Step ability persisted even after Blizzard's changes. Blizzard has also added skins for Kiriko. One such skin, "Terrible Tornado", featured Kiriko cosplaying the One-Punch Man character Tatsumaki, with the game's art director Dion Rogers noting that Kiriko's silhouette being a fit with Tatsumaki's made the skin compatible with the former. Rogers added that the skin does not compromise Kiriko's visual identity due to its treatment as in-universe cosplay.

=== Character and lore ===
Like its predecessor, Overwatch 2 will lack a traditional story mode but story components will be disseminated to players via transmedia methods, such as a fictional letter written by Kiriko's mother. On September 20, 2022, Blizzard released a trailer for Overwatch 2, featuring a short animated origin story centered on Kiriko's upbringing.

In the game's lore, Kiriko Kamori is a healing ninja hailing from Kanezaka. Designed based on Tokyo, the fictional city was first featured in a deathmatch map introduced in a 2021 update for Overwatch. The map is also present in Overwatch 2. Described by the game's developers as "funny", Kiriko often employs a "drive-by" and "tongue-in-cheek" humor. Kiriko's demeanor was made to match her play style―as she blends support and offense roles in-game, she has an "in your face" attitude in battle, yet is also "traditional, reserved, and dryly witty." Kamiya Kaoru, a character from the manga and anime Rurouni Kenshin, has been cited as a source of inspiration for Kiriko's personality.

The daughter of Toshiro and Asa Yamagami, she holds the title of "Protector of Kanezaka". Her family owns a business called Yamagami Blades. Her mother trained Hanzo and Genji of the Shimada Clan, a criminal gang of ninjas. In her youth, Kiriko joined in on this training and the Shimada brothers came to view Kiriko as a "cute, little niece figure". After the fall of the Shimada clan, less moral criminal organizations emerged. Following the Shimadas departing Kanezaka, Kiriko's father was abducted by another clan and the Yamagami Blades shop was forced to close. Along with other "young gifted individuals called the Yokai", Kiriko protects the streets of Kanezaka.

In addition to being trained by her mother, Kiriko is also strongly influenced by her grandmother, who taught her about spirituality and her ancestral history with the Kanezaka Shrine, as well as protective and healing abilities. According to Min, Kiriko acts as a "bridge between her grandmother's spiritual thinking and more modern beliefs." She carries the power of a kitsune, a fox that possesses spiritual powers.

== Appearances ==
Along with Junker Queen and Sojourn, Kiriko is among the first three new playable characters included in Overwatch 2.

Unlike its predecessor, Overwatch 2 will have a battle pass system. Junker Queen and Sojourn are unlocked by players automatically, whether they are new or returning. Kiriko, however, initially needed to be unlocked through the game's battle pass, making her the first Overwatch character to hold the distinction. The game's season one battle pass started concurrently with the game's early access launch on October 4, 2022. Characters are also included within the battle pass, making players have to unlock Kiriko. This is unlike in Overwatch, where all characters were made freely available, making Kiriko the first Overwatch character made available through a battle pass unlock. Players will be able to unlock Kiriko at level 55 out of 80 on the free track battle pass. However, a premium version of the battle pass, available for $10, unlocks her immediately. To promote the game's launch, Blizzard will be automatically giving owners of the original Overwatch who log in during Overwatch 2's first season the premium battle pass, and therefore access to Kiriko. While those who unlocked Kiriko were able to play as her on Unranked and Arcade game modes at launch, there was a two-week probation period on the character for the game's Competitive game mode. This was done to allow players a chance to test her abilities out before utilizing her in the more intense ranked matches. After the first season, those who had not yet unlocked her would need to complete seven in-game challenges in order to play as her. After Season 10 in April 2024, Kiriko and all heroes released after her are no longer tied to the battle passes, and instead free to all players, a retroactive change that includes the previous heroes released since Overwatch 2's release. Players still need to have completed the tutorial missions before gaining access to these heroes.

Kiriko, an animated short featuring the character was released the same week as Overwatch 2, premiering at TwitchCon on October 7, 2022. Delving into the titular character's relationship with her mother, the short demonstrates Kiriko's healing abilities via her saving her apartment complex's elderly maintenance worker from the Hashimoto, a yakuza-like group. Conveying both the "loving daughter" and "deadly protector" characterizations of her personality, the short also features the worker's granddaughter, a deaf child who was included as a nod to a deaf Overwatch player that had developed American sign language gestures for each of the heroes in the game. In the short, Kiriko communicates via Japanese sign language to the granddaughter.

The short received praise from video game writers, with Alyssa Mercante of GamesRadar+ calling it "a funny, heartfelt, badass rollercoaster ride". Rock Paper Shotgun's Graham Smith praised the righteousness of the short's action scene beatdown, and called the rest of the film's content "inoffensively sweet". However, in regard to the short being released in the backdrop of the game's battle pass system being received, Smith opined "Does this talk of spending money and grinding somewhat spoil the fun and cute story of inter-generational cooperation in the animated short above? Yes. Yes, it does."

Yokai, a short story authored by Christie Golden, was also released to help outline Kiriko's back story and connection to the broader Overwatch lore. In 2026, Kiriko was one of several characters included in Overwatch Rush, a mobile game developed by Blizzard.

=== Gameplay ===
In Overwatch, Kiriko is classified as a Support-class character, meant to provide aid for her team. though was designed to also have aspects of the game's Damage class to allow her to fight enemies more directly. Her main weapon, Healing Ofuda, sends out a stream of projectiles that home in on allies to heal them. Alternatively, she can fire kunai that damage opponents and have a high chance to score a critical hit. Her passive ability, "Wall Climb", allows her climb up surfaces to higher vantage points. In addition, she has two abilities that require activation, though have a "cooldown" period after use and are unable to be used again during that duration. The first, Swift Step, allows her to quickly move to another player's position instantly, passing through walls and other obstacles to reach them. "Protection Suzu" meanwhile makes her and allies around her invincible for a short period of time, while also removing any debuffs they may have received.

Lastly her Ultimate ability, "Kitsune Rush", needs to be charged before use. The ability charges slowly during the course of gameplay, and can be charged faster through damage dealt to the enemy team or healing provided to allies. Once full the ability can be activated to create a road in front of her marked by torii with her spiritual fox running along it for a period of time. The road goes in a straight line, and can go up and down surfaces. Allies in contact with the road benefit from increased movement and attack speed, as well as reduced cooldown periods on their skills and faster weapon reloading.

== Critical reception ==
With Kiriko's reveal made ahead of the imminent Overwatch 2 release, she attracted much media and fan attention. Despite her inclusion through Overwatch 2's battle pass reward system being criticized by players, some still received her positively including via fan art. Peppiatt likened her to a "sort-of" mascot for Overwatch 2 in its early access period.

Taylor Hatmaker of TechCrunch was critical of Kiriko's character design, particularly how Blizzard approached her Asian depiction, saying it was "expressed in a way that's a bit over the top, culturally speaking." Writing for TheGamer, Brian Hendershot also criticized Kiriko's characterization as leaning into Asian streotypes. Hendershot opined that Kiriko's origin trailer video was a "textbook example of how not to design or present a Japanese character. The trailer opens with cringe-inducing references to honor, intergenerational obligations, and long-forgotten mystic arts." He added that the "problem" with Kiriko was not her depiction as "yet another honor-bound, semi-mystical, ninja-esque Japanese warrior," nor the merging of traditional and contemporary motifs in her design, but rather Blizzard relying on "overused tropes" when approaching Kiriko's Japanese background. Hendershot further lamented that legitimate fleshing out of Kiriko's character were "tucked away in places where no one will see them: character portraits, tags, and lore videos." Elie Gould of TechRadar offered mixed feelings on Kiriko, suggesting her playstyle, "great [fashion] style", and backstory offered much to be moved by, and also calling her use of sign language a "welcome addition" to Overwatch. However, Gould stated Blizzard was doing a "disservice" to Kiriko's visual design by using a similar body type, as well as facial features for the character as they have with other female characters on the roster. Gould further added that "Kiriko's formulaic appearance overshadows" the efforts made to her narrative development and her gameplay and art designs. Gould closed her comments on Kiriko by assessing that "a character with such an exciting story and design deserves her own identity."

Reaction to Kiriko's characterization has been mixed. Jessica Howard of GameSpot wrote that Kiriko "exerts a sort of youthful energy and intelligence that makes her incredibly personable." After her reveal, Adam Benjamin commented, "Kiriko almost seems like she was engineered in a lab to appeal to players. You like playing support? Here you go. You like ninjas? Ta-da. Foxes? Your ultimate is a fox. And, honestly, that laboratory formula is working." However, some writers have cited some fan reception of the character's reception as being critical. Some cited by Peppiatt were critical of Kiriko's dialogue lines and Amaki's vocal portrayal of the character. Eva Martinello of Dot Esports cited a thread titled "Why Do People Dislike Kiriko's Personality?", in which many fans voiced issues with Kiriko's characterization through in-game dialogue, noting a disconnect between the character's portrayal in-game and in her animated film appearance. On Kiriko's characterization, Martinello wrote "her personality unveiled through voice-over is different [from the Kiriko short]. The 23-year-old talks more like a teenager, taunting enemies and showing over-confidence."

Kiriko's lore and place within the Overwatch narrative has also been a point of criticism for some media writers. Drew Swanson of Game Rant has opined that Kiriko "leaves something to be desired in regard to her backstory and how it is integrated into the lore for other characters," adding that not a total misstep, Kiriko's lore does include inconsistencies and missed opportunities leaving her as a "shell" of her potential as a character. While calling her backstory "bland", Swanson was also critical of "questionable" lore elements, namely the age gaps between the Shimada brothers and Kiriko, and their pertaining to the narrative's consistency.

== See also ==
- Foxes in popular culture, films and literature
