= Reaper (Overwatch) =

Fictional character in the 2016 video game Overwatch

- Overwatch character
- Reaper's appearance in Overwatch
- First game: Overwatch (2016)
- Created by: Jeff Kaplan
- Designed by: Arnold Tsang; Ben Zhang (effects, equipment)
- Voiced by: Keith Ferguson

In-universe information
- Class: Damage
- Nationality: American

Reaper is the alias of Gabriel Reyes, a character who first appeared in the 2016 video game Overwatch, a Blizzard Entertainment–developed first-person hero shooter, later featured in its resulting franchise and subsequent 2022 sequel, Overwatch 2. Conceived by Jeff Kaplan in the early development phases of the game, his design was fleshed out by Arnold Tsang and other Blizzard artists.

== Conception and development ==
While working on a massive multiplayer online game concept for Blizzard Entertainment, developer Geoff Goodman suggested the idea of a large number of character classes for players to select, but with class specialization for each. Fellow developer Jeff Kaplan took this idea to heart, salvaging character concepts from Titan—a then-recently cancelled Blizzard project—and character artwork by artist Arnold Tsang for that project. Kaplan created an eight-page pitch for a first person shooter concept to propose the idea which included a series of proposed characters, among them a character called "Reaper" clad in a black trench coat and a face mask.

Reaper's weapons and visual effects were devised by artist Ben Zhang, with several concepts considered on how he would move and appear visually. Various weapons were considered for his character, including a magnum pistol, dual submachine guns, and a grenade launcher. Ultimately, they chose to go with two shotguns, as they felt these would be heavier and more threatening. However, elements of the grenade launcher weapon carried into his finalized design, which features several bandoliers of grenade rounds around his body. The weapon concept was also featured in Overwatch's debut cinematic, with Reaper using it to attack the character Winston.

=== Design ===
Reaper stands approximately 6 feet 1 inch (185 cm) tall.

Like other Overwatch characters, Reaper received skins, unlockable cosmetic items to change his in-game appearance. One of which was "Mariachi", which added a large sombrero to his design. While the development team was initially worried the hat would make his silhouette too similar to that of fellow character Cassidy, they felt his unique posture and animations made him easily recognizable despite it.

== Appearances ==
Born in Los Angeles, Gabriel Reyes was a veteran officer of the United States Armed Forces who was subjected to a "soldier enhancement program", where he and the other selectees were genetically enhanced to become "perfect soldiers"; Reyes became known as "Soldier: 24". When the United Nations formed Overwatch to combat the Omnic Crisis, Reyes was on the shortlist to join up and became its first leader, commanding Overwatch through the first omnic crisis until he was ultimately supplanted by the UN, who gave the position of First Strike Commander to Jack Morrison instead. There is evidence in lore that Reyes actually preferred this role, as he was not fond of the limelight that First Strike Commander came with, and was not envious of Morrison for taking the job, suggesting that Reyes much preferred to work behind the scenes. Reyes was then named commander of Blackwatch, Commander of Overwatch's black ops division, but ultimately, Reyes began to fall victim to the persuasion of Doomfist who reinfiorced what Reyes was starting to believe, which is that Overwatch as an organization was flawed and had its hands tied in terms of what they could, and could not do. This would ultimately twist Reyes' mind into a darker mindset, which eventually lead to him betraying Overwatch, which ended in a massive explosion that took place in Switzerland. Both men were believed dead, but in reality survived, although Reyes's cells are now simultaneously decaying and regenerating, causing his body to fall apart and rebuild itself over and over again, a condition he allegedly received from the ethically bankrupt Geneticist, Moira O'Deorain, during the time of Blackwatch and especially during the time of Retribution.

Reyes resurfaced years later as "the Reaper", a mysterious mercenary responsible for terrorist attacks all around the world, having been consumed by his hunger for fame to the point that he no longer cared what he was known for. Moira went with him, and through her, he has developed the ability to steal life essence from his enemies, and also become incorporeal to avoid harm. Ultimately, the two would join the terrorist organization known as Talon. His true identity is unknown to the rest of the world, as are his motivations, though a pattern of his movements indicates that he is hunting down former agents of Overwatch. He appears in the cinematic trailer, teamed with Widowmaker in a raid in the Overwatch Museum to steal Doomfist's gauntlet for Talon. He also appears in the animated short Recall, where he raids Winston's lab at Gibraltar to steal his list of Overwatch agents, though he was unsuccessful. After the character Vendetta takes over the organization in Overwatch 2, he and several other members leave Talon and are now on the run. In 2026, Reaper was one of several characters included in Overwatch Rush, a mobile game developed by Blizzard.

=== Gameplay ===
Reaper is a flanker/assassin type of character, able to teleport behind enemy lines and attack from the rear to single out targets of importance, before using Wraith Form to escape. The ability to heal from dealing damage helps him in taking out tanks, due to their large bodies and health pools making it easier for him to heal rapidly. Reaper is vulnerable while executing his Death Blossom, so proper usage of it relies heavily on the element on surprise, taking enemies out with its massive damage output before they get the chance to react.

== Promotion and reception ==
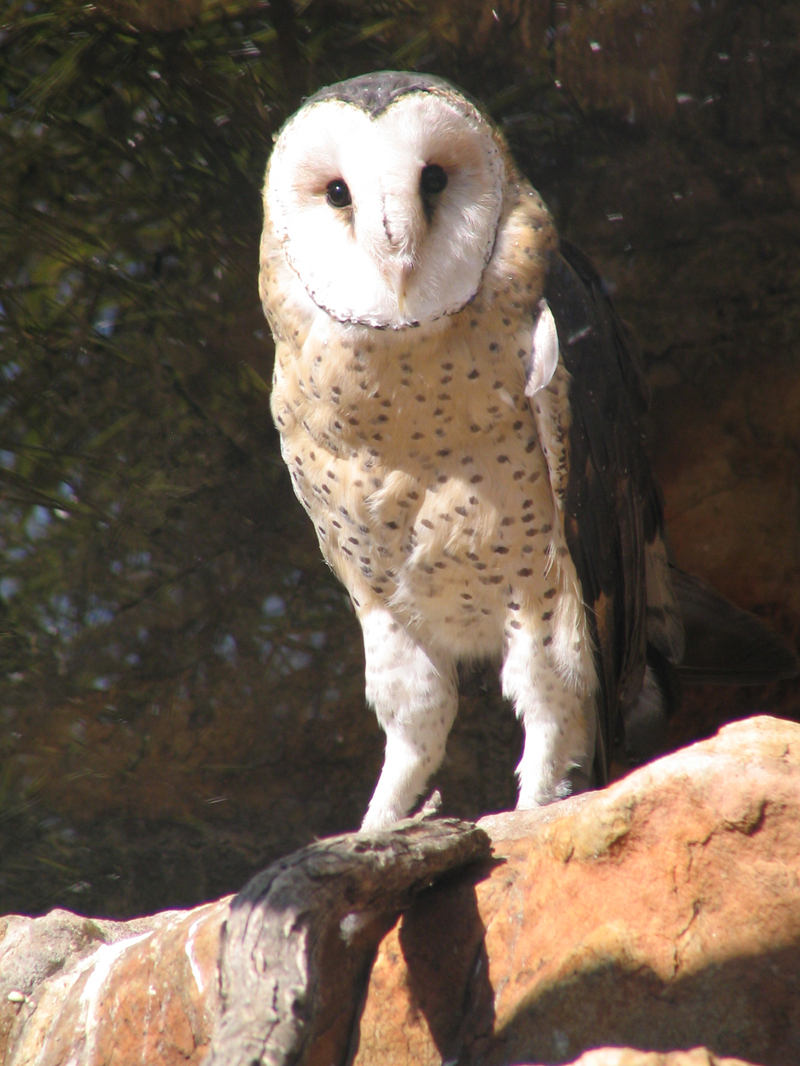
Reaper's mask has been compared to a barn owl, a symbol of death and destruction in Meso-American cultures

To promote Overwatch and the character, Reaper was one of twelve heroes showcased in a playable build of the game at the 2014 BlizzCon convention, while additional material included a cosplay guide and promotional images themed around holidays. Nerf meanwhile released a foam dart shooting white replica of his shotgun, while Hasbro released a figure based on his Blackwatch appearance as Gabriel.

Reaper was mostly well received since his debut. Polygon's Daniel Friedman described him as among "the least nuanced characters in all of gaming", due to his design and voice lines often focusing on death. While he further described him as an "extra-emo version of Skeletor", Reaper was also his favorite character in Overwatch "by a huge margin". Patricia Hernandez in an article for Kotaku stated that while Reaper's personality came across as "tryhard edgelording", she enjoyed how the community added some humor to him, through elements such as a Twitter account that documented the names of players using Reaper. She stated more ironic usernames juxtaposed against the character's design were often ridiculous, and helped change how she perceived the character in-game.

Amanda Wallace of Kill Screen described him as "the ultimate edgelord symbol", describing how much of his character design seemed to call out to a part of herself that "lusts after Tripp pants, Evanescence, and black nail polish", reflecting the "traditional symbols to which pubescent angst-queens attach themselves". Further stating that Reaper had a tendency to almost seem effortless in how he moved, she felt he represented an archetype of characters "meant to be dark and moody" often found in ensemble-cast games. However, compared to similar character he was elevated by both the voice acting and backstory, as well as how elements such as his design reflected his cultural heritage, that being the symbolism of a barn owl and how Meso-American often associated it with death and destruction.

Dr. Felipe Antônio de Souza in a dissertation for the Federal University of Santa Catarina examined the characters of Overwatch through the scope of social semiotics. In regards to Reaper, he felt the character had the most aggressive visual elements amongst the cast, with his use of dual weapons to fight and body language in many cases indicating a defensive position. He additionally noted how well his outfit elements such as his trenchcoat came together to portray a revenge-seeking villain and a blood thirsty psychopath. de Souza echoed Amanda Wallace's observation of the barn owl symbolism referencing his heritage and grim reaper aesthetic, and felt this tied into his crow-themed "Nevermore" skin, in how the mask changed to a crow's beak while also resembling the mask of a plague doctor.

Reaper's portrayal in the Code of Violence novella drew negative reception from fans, ranging from lore inconsistencies to his characterization. Cass Marshall of Polygon acknowledged the lore inconsistencies, though argued that while the dialogue in the novella was thick it felt appropriate for Reaper's personality. They further expressed that while the novella focuses on him reminiscing about his wife, the fact that prior media had not developed their relationship diminished the narrative impact. Marshall also observed that some fans responded to the novella by suggesting Reaper may be an unreliable narrator in the story, something Marshall felt would actually be in-character. This theory was quickly shot down however, as author Brandon Easton argued there was much the general audience didn't know about the character, and this characterization was part of a long-term narrative.

=== Analysis of gameplay ===
Friedman in his own article felt that Reaper's abilities funneled the player to "a single, but fun, gameplay loop" where they work to flank the opposing team and then retreat rather than engage them directly due to the character's shortcomings. This resulted in him being a character that was highly specialized, and he felt this illustrated how Overwatch built characters around a particular role and showing the cohesion between a character's weapon, abilities, and mobility. Friedman further stated that because it encouraged players to play proactively, Reaper's gameplay reflected a "purity of design that ends up being more enjoyable than limiting", helping to give Overwatch a homogenous feel and something he felt other games could learn from.

Nic Rowen of Destructoid argued similar points, describing him as "the high-risk, high-reward ambush assassin" archetype he personally enjoyed in gaming. However, unlike similar characters he noted Reaper's usual slow mobility set him apart from others in the genre, which tended to be highly agile or have an ability to hide from player's view to ambush. Rowen pointed out because of this, players were required to approach the character with a "sneaky" mindset, using his abilities to instead utilize educated guesswork to be effective. This gameplay mechanic was something he felt was at home in MOBA-style games, and expressed surprise Blizzard had not included him in their own MOBA title, Heroes of the Storm, with this in mind.

Rowen pointed out too that this resulted in the character also being under-utilized and underappreciated, particularly by the competitive scene, a parallel to Reaper's backstory he enjoyed. He felt as a result of players treating the character as one to avoid picking, it instead further encouraged a particular meta that ultimately dominated the game. Additionally, he felt the addition of characters like Sombra also actively worked against his utility, taking his designed role in the game and causing Reaper to take an "awkward spot where he isn't the best offense character in a straight-up fight, nor is he the sneakiest character [...] No wonder the guy has attitude problems."
