= Cassidy (Overwatch) =

Fictional character in the Overwatch franchise

Cole Cassidy
- Overwatch character
- Cassidy's appearance in Overwatch
- First game: Overwatch (2016)
- Created by: Chris Metzen
- Designed by: Arnold Tsang and Peter Lee; Ben Zhang (revolver)
- Voiced by: Matthew Mercer

In-universe information
- Alias: Jesse McCree
- Class: Damage
- Nationality: American

Cole Cassidy is a character who first appeared in the 2016 video game Overwatch, a Blizzard Entertainment–developed first-person hero shooter, and the resulting franchise. Originally named Jesse McCree after a developer at Blizzard, the character's name was changed in 2021 after the developer was fired for alleged inappropriate behavior at the company.

== Conception and development ==
Logann's concept defined several of Cassidy's aspects, such as his cybernetic arm.

The character's original concept was designed by Chris Metzen as a cyborg cowboy considered for the original StarCraft, "Prospector Logann". Years later, Blizzard concept artists Arnold Tsang and Peter Lee refined the design for a then-planned StarCraft game. While the project itself was cancelled, after Overwatch's development team took a liking to the design's combination of science fiction and gunslinger archetypes, it was recycled for a new character in the game. In their eyes the design had everything they wanted in a playable character : a strong personality, unique visual style, and memorable pop culture themes.

According to lead writer Michael Chu, they wanted to give the character "the perfect cowboy name", and referencing separate lists of first and last names they were unable to find a combination they felt that fit. One of the developers suggested "Jesse McCree", after a then-Blizzard developer. The team liked it, and the developer signed over the rights for his name to the team for use. The name was used for the character until 2021, when in July of that year a lawsuit was filed by California's Department of Fair Employment against Activision Blizzard related to workplace misconduct and discrimination against female employees. Among the employees involved was McCree, who was fired due to the alleged behavior. In the weeks that followed, during broadcasts of the Overwatch League eSports gameplay, announcers opted to use "the cowboy" instead of "McCree" when calling matches. Blizzard confirmed in late August 2021 that they would rename McCree "to something that better represents what Overwatch stands for", changing it to Cole Cassidy.

=== Design ===
Cassidy stands 6 feet 1 inch (185 cm) tall, and is a tanned male with brown hair and a chin curtain beard. His left arm is replaced with a cybernetic prosthetic from the elbow down. He is dressed in the manner of a cowboy, with a hat, spurs and large belt buckle that spells "BAMF". A glove covers his right hand, a kneepad on his right leg, a metal vest with tubing surrounds his torso over his shirt. His upper body is covered by a red serape which drapes past his waist. He has gun holsters on both hips with an ammo belt in between, with the right holster holding his large revolver. When adapting his previous work Tsang aimed to make minimal changes to the design, such as the serape and adding flash bangs to his belt. His revolver, "Peacekeeper", was conceptualized by artist Ben Zhang. Some consideration was given to which of his arms would hold the gun, and it was decided that his right arm should hold the weapon, so his mechanical left would be able to rapidly fan the gun's hammer.

Like other Overwatch characters, Cassidy received skins, unlockable cosmetic items to change his in-game appearance. His in game 3D model consists of several layered meshes, causing some difficulty when creating skins for the character, as some of his animations interacted with his belt and hat. Of these, his "Summer" changes his hair to blonde, gives him a straw hat and lifeguard shorts for an outfit, a beach towel around his shoulders, and changes his belt's phrase to "SAMF". This skin led to a significant amount of fan reaction, with Nathan Grayson of Kotaku comparing it in appearance to actor Owen Wilson, and others trying to comprehend what "SAMF" was supposed to mean exactly.

With the release of Overwatch 2, the character's design was revised, giving him a full beard, additional armor plating, and most notably a lighter skintone. This led to some confusion amongst players, as some had assumed due to his darker skin color the character possibly had Native American or Hispanic heritage prior to the change. In a "Ask Us Anything" thread on social media website Reddit, the developers responded to a question regarding the matter by stating that the character was "white and just very tan".

== Appearances ==
In the Overwatch narrative, Cassidy came from Santa Fe, New Mexico. At some point in his early life, he assumed the pseudonym of "Jesse McCree" to hide from his past, and joined the Deadlock Gang, a group of traffickers in military hardware operating in the American Southwest. He and his fellows were captured in an Overwatch sting operation, and he was given a choice: prison, or serving in Blackwatch, the black ops division of Overwatch. He chose the latter, believing he could make amends for his past crimes, and reveling in the lack of bureaucratic oversight. When Overwatch began to collapse and Blackwatch sought to reform it to its own ends, Cassidy went underground, resurfacing years later as a gunslinger for hire, dropping his false name. After Winston initiates the recall message to reform Overwatch, Cassidy receives it, but initially refuses it and insists Echo, the creation of the late Dr. Mina Liao, to rejoin the organization in his stead. He is soon approached by Ana Amari, who also got the message and persuades him to make Overwatch better by finding new heroes to join the cause. Cassidy ends up recruiting Pharah, Baptiste, Zarya, and D.Va into his new team. Outside of Overwatch, Cassidy also appears in the updated dating sim game Loverwatch, exclusive to Chinese regions.

=== Gameplay ===
In Overwatch, Cassidy is classified as a Damage-class character, designed to provide a more offensive role in team compositions. His primary weapon fires one shot at a time, or if the alternate firing mode is used rapidly fires the pistol at a loss of accuracy. Cassidy also has several abilities that require activation, each having a "cooldown" period after use where they are unable to be used again during that duration. "Combat Roll" allows him to dodge attacks, while immediately reloading his revolver when activated. Meanwhile "Flashbang" throws a short distance grenade which will stun enemies and can interrupt their own abilities; in Overwatch 2, this was replaced with "Magnetic Grenade", an attack that dealt high damage on a direct hit, but no longer caused stun. Later, the "Magnetic Grenade" was replaced back with "Flashbang"; it is the same short-range grenade like in Overwatch, but doesn't make the affected heroes unable to be controlled, instead slowing them and disabling their mobility abilities. Lastly, his 'ultimate' ability, called "Deadeye", requires to be charged before use. The ability charges slowly during the course of gameplay, and can be charged faster through damage dealt to the enemy team. Once full the ability can be activated to line up shots on every enemy in his sight, with resulting damage proportional to the time spent aiming.

According to developer Geoff Goodman, Blizzard wanted Cassidy to be a hero strong against agile opponents and to counter close-range abilities. To achieve this, they repeatedly modified his abilities in the months after the game's initial release, which led some to jokingly call him "the most indecisive character" of the game. Initially seen as a popular pick in almost any situation, the character was particularly useful for dealing with Tank-class characters. However, director and lead designer of Overwatch felt the character was too effective in this role, and as a result his gameplay was changed over the course of updates to have him act as an "anti-flanker" character with additional long-range capability.

== Promotion and reception ==
Cassidy was first unveiled as a playable character at the PAX East convention in June 2015. To promote Overwatch and the character, Blizzard Entertainment released a cosplay guide and promotional images themed around holidays.

Joseph Knoop of The Daily Dot felt the character's personality was the most significant factor for his appeal, noting that while he felt the character's gameplay was lacking there was "no getting around the fact that a cowboy with 'BAMF' on his belt buckle and a robotic arm is totally awesome". Author Matt Margini cited Cassidy as an example of the enduring nature of the cowboy aesthetic, stating that Overwatch wouldn't be the same without the "(literal) straight shooter who keeps the game tethered both thematically and mechanically to more grounded forms of gunplay. Cass Marshall of Polygon stated that while Cassidy was "a silly character", it was part of his charm, and in some ways represents the best parts of the franchise's setting. They additionally praised the character's sense of decency, putting others before himself or the mission to keep them safe and his interactions that contrasted against the more stern faces of the Overwatch group. Marshall hoped to see more of the character, stating that despite Cassidy's flaws "he still manages to be one of Overwatch's best heroes, and that's something we can all admire."

Kill Screen's Chris Priestman felt Cassidy embodied the "falsity" of how old west gunslingers were perceived, drawing direct inspiration from Val Kilmer's portrayal of Doc Holliday and Clint Eastwood's The Man with No Name and adding that while visually Cassidy was a joke, "as cheesy as his belt buckle is [...] it's not without merit." Priestman further stated that while the character felt out of place in the Overwatch cast, and his own initial assumption was to assume Cassidy was an "asshole", the character inspired imagery of popular depictions of cowboys and the old Wild West, as opposed to simply being someone in a costume "trying to hide behind the image". He shared Marshall's approval of his sense of decency, and added that Cassidy "has it where it counts [...] You're supposed to feel intimidated by the stone-cold manliness he resurrects from the past."

In May 2017, the social networking website Tumblr sifted through its data in order to determine which character pairings in Overwatch were the most popular. The data revealed that Cassidy and Hanzo (resulting in the nickname "McHanzo" due to Cassidy's name at the time) were the most popular pairing and that in all "shipping" related posts, they were shipped 35% of the time. (Note: Shipping, derived from the word relationship, is the desire by fans for two or more people, either real-life individuals or fictional characters (in film, literature, television etc.) to be in a relationship, romantic or otherwise. Such pairings are called "ships" and often have their own names.) A McHanzo-related fan fiction story titled "Hang the Fool", published on Archive of Our Own, was noted by Kotaku for being long-running. First starting in June 2016, the fanfic had garnered more than 300,000 hits by the end of 2017, even getting a fanzine based on it published. "Hang the Fool" was recognized by Syfy's Kristina Manete in 2020, and Manete noted another McHanzo fic titled "The Chain" for being a "wonderful study of [Cassidy] and Hanzo's personalities and pasts culminates in a spectacular fic for fans of the pair". While McHanzo is not canonized within Overwatch and Blizzard has not confirmed it, people involved with the game and company have acknowledged it. Matthew Mercer described the pairing as "adorable", noting that the characters' contrasting personalities makes the ship interesting. Jeff Kaplan, when asked by a fan at BlizzCon 2017, stated that McHanzo is one of his two favorite ships from the game; the other being Pharah and Mercy.
