= Genesis (miniseries) =

- The video thumbnail used for "Part One: Dawn"
- Genre: Science fiction
- Country of origin: United States
- Original language: English
- No. of episodes: 3

Production
- Running time: 5–7 minutes
- Production company: Blizzard Entertainment

Original release
- Network: YouTube
- Release: July 6 – July 20, 2023

Genesis is an American animated mini-series of shorts created and produced by Blizzard Entertainment. Released on YouTube, the series is based on the Overwatch video game franchise and its characters. A three-part miniseries, Genesis premiered on July 6, 2023.

== Premise ==
A company, Omnica Corporation, creates sentient robots called omnics, as a result of global research on artificial intelligence (AI). Technological advances over time lead to these omnics taking over many tasks, making life easier for the human population. Omnica later hires robotic prodigy Dr. Mina Liao to develop omnics further. These developments lead to the onset of the Omnic Crisis, a war between omnics and humans.

In response to the Omnic Crisis, a global task force called Overwatch is formed.

== Characters and cast ==
- Jeannie Bolet as Dr. Mina Liao
- Fábio Azevedo as Lt. Gen. Ricardo Perez, a member of the Brazilian Armed Forces and UN Military Affairs
- Camara Verne, a robotics engineer who worked with Dr. Mina Liao
- Mathias Verne, a robotics engineer
- Aurora, a sentient omnic created by Dr. Mina Liao's team at Omnica
- Grant, an omnic author

== Episodes ==
No. overall	No. in season	Title	Directed by	Written by	Original release date	Viewers (millions)
1	1	"Part One: Dawn"	Unknown	Unknown	July 6, 2023	0.99 (Note: Approximate viewers as of October 4, 2023.)
2	2	"Part Two: Innocence"	Unknown	Unknown	July 13, 2023	0.70 (Note: Approximate viewers as of October 4, 2023.)
3	3	"Part Three: Rebirth"	Unknown	Unknown	July 20, 2023	0.58 (Note: Approximate viewers as of October 4, 2023.)

== Development and release ==
Prior to Genesis, Blizzard had released animated "cinematic" short films that often centered on the lore of a specific character. These shorts have been positively received from the game's fanbase and general viewers, with outlets comparing the production value of the shorts to that of Pixar's. Story elements are often noted by media outlets as being largely absent from the video games, with Blizzard having stated they intentionally sought to incorporate a transmedia storytelling method to the franchise, with such story elements previously disseminated through the aforementioned animated shorts, but also through comics and other literary media.

Blizzard announced Genesis on June 30, 2023. The series employed an anime art style, with the series being one of the studio's first 2D animation projects to go "beyond" individual character backstories and instead focusing on the overarching narrative of the Overwatch franchise. Genesis is also presented as a documentary primarily from the human perspective.

The series premiered on July 6, 2023, with the release of the first episode, "Dawn". It was released ahead of Overwatch 2's "Invasion" update, which is set to introduce player versus player (PvP) modes and release in August 2023. The Genesis series also released shortly after Blizzard scrapped a long-time plan to implement a co-op player versus environment (PvE) mode that was intended to include many narrative elements; this PvE mode was often cited as a reason for Blizzard to release a sequel to Overwatch. The second episode, "Innocence" was released on July 13. The third and final episode, "Rebirth", released on July 20.

== Reception ==
Scott Duwe of The Daily Dot commented on the trailer for Genesis, calling it "freakishly timely" due to the presence of "helpful AI that turned on humanity". Kenneth Shepard of Kotaku wrote that he was "honestly surprised it took Blizzard this long to invest in an animated series," referencing how previous Overwatch animated projects told "disparate stories". Following the end of the series, Shepard additionally wrote that the series felt like a "glorified trailer", with its documentary formatting providing information on, but not exploration of the series' themes. Shepard opined that some parts of Genesis had a "gravitas" to them and also praised the "gorgeous animation and cinematography".
