= Wrecking Ball (Overwatch) =

Fictional hero in Blizzard's 2016 video game Overwatch

- Overwatch character
- Hammond and his mecha "Wrecking Ball" from Overwatch
- First appearance: Overwatch (2018)
- Designed by: Arnold Tsang
- Voiced by: Dee Bradley Baker (Hammond); Jonathan Lipow (Mech)

In-universe information
- Class: Tank
- Origin: Horizon Lunar Colony

Wrecking Ball, also known by the name of the character's pilot, Hammond, is a character who first appeared in the 2016 video game Overwatch, a Blizzard Entertainment–developed first-person hero shooter, and the resulting franchise. Hammond is an intelligent hamster who controls a quadrupedal robot mecha that can transform into a high-speed wrecking ball equipped with a grappling hook. The character was introduced in late June 2018 as the title's 28th hero, and made available for all players in late July 2018.

The concept of Wrecking Ball originated from a spheric robotic tank based on magnetism skills, conceived early in Overwatch's development, alongside a push for how "cute" they could make a hero design within the game; Wrecking Ball came about when the team, looking for a new tank character, recognized the potential linkage of ideas themed around a hamster ball.

== Conception and creation ==
The concept of Wrecking Ball had been proposed early in Overwatch's development cycle, though never given significant development work until after release, according to Geoff Goodman. Writer Arnold Tsang said that the idea came from two different tracks of thoughts when they were designing the first set of characters of Overwatch. One track was for a demolitionist character which would ultimately become Junkrat. One proposed idea was named "Ball Guy", a robot that could transform into a sphere and roll around. His skill kit would have included aspects of magnetism, with one ability to draw in enemy bullets, store them, and then fire them back at opponents. However, at the time, the game already had several other Omnic characters and developers did not feel the need for an additional robot. The rolling aspect became the basis of Junkrat's ultimate ability, his Riptire. Another train of thought was to see if Overwatch could support a "cute" character, and their artists came up with several animal-based concepts, including the infamous Jetpack Cat. However, none of these ideas worked within the Overwatch theme. At this point, the groups working on these two tracks came up with the idea of making a robotic hamster to be combined with the spherical tank idea, playing off the idea of a hamster ball. While they liked the idea, they decided to put the design on hold to focus on the initial roster of characters for Overwatch's release.

The team came back to explore Wrecking Ball while developing out the Horizon Lunar Colony map, which features into Winston's backstory, while at the same time planning on a new Tank hero. Previously, they had considered Winston, a super-intelligent gorilla who was part of an experimental study at Horizon, to be their most out-there idea. They were able to revisit the robotic hamster idea, but to fit into the Horizon setting, made the hamster a living creature - one of the Horizon test subjects with boosted intelligence - and gave him the spherical mech to pilot. Hammond's design was meant to be a mix of Western and Eastern art styles, somewhere between Zootopia and Hamtaro.

Jeff Kaplan stated that the goal for Hammond to be a "very disruptive, high mobility" tank that would be fun to play. Kaplan said that even within Blizzard, Wrecking Ball was a controversial character to add, with some developers thinking they had gone too far and wrecked the game. Kaplan reiterated that Wrecking Ball was designed to explore the edge of how far they could take a unique character in the game, and does not anticipate that there will be a hero more "wackier" than Wrecking Ball for future heroes.

One ability that was tested involved Wrecking Ball gaining momentum as the character rolled through the level, causing more damage to enemy heroes. However, this had unintended consequences as Wrecking Ball's momentum could be redirected by certain abilities, like Pharah's "Concussive Blast", and damage unintended targets; as Overwatch was developed to avoid friendly fire, the ability was scrapped. During this period, developers came upon the idea of including a grappling hook as part of the character's skill kit, which Goodman believed cemented the character. For the grappling hook feature to work, Blizzard had to refine some parts of how the Overwatch game was run related to their physics engine; most physics calculations were made on the client side, so how objects moved under the control of physics may appear different to all players. Blizzard had previously explored a full server-side physics engine, which was helpful for testing, but was a strain for regular matches. Enough of Wrecking Ball's physics were conducted server side for consistent behavior for all players. Developers also experimented with several variants of what would become Wrecking Ball's adaptive shield, which at one point involved the character firing off up to four beam turrets that would provide shields for the hero, but like Symmetra's turrets, these could be placed in difficult-to-hit locations, making it hard for opponents to destroy them. As Wrecking Ball was designed to fare well in clusters of opponents, the design team ultimately went with shields boosted in accordance with the number of nearby opponents. Wrecking Ball's piledriver ability was originally envisioned as his ultimate. In this iteration, the ultimate would launch Wrecking Ball up before slamming into the ground, and would have left opponents hanging in the air for five seconds. Once they added the grappling hook, these additional effects were deemed unnecessary and piledrive eventually became a regular ability.

Due to Wrecking Ball having two sets of voice lines (one for Hammond's squeaks, another for the mech's translation), Blizzard had to rework the system that characters would use at the start of matches to account for Wrecking Ball's lines. Other sound effects for the character were taken from various weapons firing recordings, and from the sound of rolling metal balls and bowling balls alongside the spinning of a hamster wheel. For voicing Hammond, Blizzard had constructed a fictional language of hamster-speak and was looking to use a mix of animal noises, such as coyotes pups, to create the voice lines. Blizzard then received an audition tape from Dee Bradley Baker, a voice actor well known for his work doing animal sounds, and Blizzard changed direction to incorporate Baker's lines.

Goodman considered that, at the time of Wrecking Ball's release, the hero would become disruptive to the metagame at the time. A frequent strategy at that point was for defenses to stack up at an objective with shield-bearing characters like Reinhardt and Orisa providing sufficient defense to make it difficult for the attacking team to break through. Existing characters like D.Va and Winston can hurl themselves behind or within enemies lines, but without support, these characters do not survive long on their own. Goodman said that with Wrecking Ball's combined abilities, the character has a way to get into a defensive line, survive long enough, and escape quickly due to the mech's mobility. Goodman said that Wrecking Ball is still fragile, as if the character is trapped or slowed, it becomes very easy to take down.

Wrecking Ball's release was an interregnum from preceding Overwatch add-on content, which was based on new villains and geopolitical conflict. While Overwatch developer Blizzard had hinted at the character's existence, the game's official Twitter account conspicuously teased the character in the days prior to its announcement in late June 2018 as the 28th playable hero on the roster. Wrecking Ball was released for public testing on the Public Test Region (PTR) the same day as the announcement. Wrecking Ball was fully added to Overwatch on all game servers on July 24, 2018.

== Appearances ==
Hammond's backstory was first introduced through changes made to the Horizon Lunar Colony map in May 2018, and later expanded upon the character's announcement. In the game's story, Hammond is a hamster and one of the test subjects at the Horizon Lunar Colony, given heightened intelligence by the human scientists, from which he gained a liking for mechanics. Amidst a test subject uprising, Hammond planned to escape to Earth alongside the gorilla Winston by tethering an escape pod to Winston's capsule. Approaching Earth, Hammond's capsule broke loose and fell into the Australian Outback, near the fictional city of Junkertown. He modified the escape pod to become a battle mech, through which he competed in Junkertown's robot combat arena under the ring name Wrecking Ball, becoming its champion.

Wrecking Ball is one of the playable "hero" characters in the team-based multiplayer first-person shooter video game Overwatch. The character is a tank-class mecha robot driven by a genetically engineered hamster named Hammond. The mech's move set includes a quadpedal combat mode with automatic assault weapons known as the "Quad Cannons", and a high-speed "Roll" mode in which the mech condenses into a ball armed with a "Grappling Claw". The grappling claw can attach to surfaces and use the mech's rolling momentum to launch into enemies and the air. While in the air, the ball can slam into the ground, sucking in and damaging enemies using his "Piledriver" move. Wrecking Ball also has an "Adaptive Shield" ability, which adds temporary shields based on the count of nearby enemies. His ultimate ability is "Minefield" that scatters a proximity mine minefield around the character. With the launch of Season 10 of Overwatch 2 in April 2024, Blizzard added two new abilities to Wrecking Ball. One was the ability to retract their "Grappling Claw" at a modest rate, giving the character more mobility options. The second was the ability to distribute any added shields from the "Adaptive Shield" ability to nearby teammates, as to make Wrecking Ball more of a team character. Further, when using the "Grappling Claw", if Wrecking Ball does not reach high speeds when he detacts, then the cooldown for using the "Grappling Claw" is significantly reduced.

Hammond does not speak human languages, however the Wrecking Ball mech translates his voice into English. Dee Bradley Baker provides Hammond's squeaks, while Jonathan Lipow voices the mech's translation.

In the "Storm Rising" special event during April 2019, Wrecking Ball was given a new highlight introduction that parodied the Dramatic Chipmunk meme.

Lead game producer Adam Gershowitz said that Blizzard knew the character would likely be divisive within the Overwatch community, but they worked to establish a backstory and an interesting set of powers that would make Wrecking Ball's introduction fit within the game.

== Critical reception ==
Reception to Wrecking Ball was mixed. Due to the game's storyline, players assumed the character would be a monkey companion to Winston, based on his scientific facility's backstory. Austen Goslin of Polygon felt the character was disappointing upon release. While he noted he didn't dislike the character and felt the design was fantastic, Blizzard's approach to his reveal, primarily due to a lack of proper buildup, made the character not "feel properly foreshadowed or new and interesting". The problem in Goslin's eyes was further exasperated by the lack of connection Hammond had with the main story, and despite the connections to Winston the character felt "ancillary at best", a steady decline from the quality of characters Blizzard had introduced in the game prior. Other outlets and players complained that the character had been added to the game before a black woman had, leading to them questioning Blizzard's stated commitment to character diversity.

Many players and media outlets complained about the name choice of "Wrecking Ball", preferring "Hammond" instead, which is shorter and easier to use in callouts. However, Goodman stated that Blizzard would be unlikely to change the name, as the lore established that Hammond would want to keep the name "Wrecking Ball".

Due to the character's unique design, Ali Jones of PCGamesN noted player's experimenting with a custom game type in which they race in his "wrecking ball" mode to see who could traverse the game's levels the fastest. PC Gamer described the character as the game's most inventive.
