= Titan (cancelled video game) =

Project name for a cancelled video game

Titan was the project name for a cancelled Blizzard Entertainment massively multiplayer online game. With speculation regarding the game beginning in 2007, Blizzard revealed little information besides that it would be completely new and not be based on the company's then-current three main franchises.

The game was internally canceled by Blizzard in May 2013, though publicly they announced that the project would be delayed as they took the title in a different direction. Its official cancellation was made in September 2014. Internally, about forty members of the Titan project used the developed assets to craft a new game which became Overwatch (2016).

== Gameplay ==
The exact details of how Titan would have played are not fully known, but Blizzard's Jeff Kaplan, who served on the Titan development team and later became the director for Overwatch, identified that the game "was a class-based MMO." Players would have selected a character from several classes, which granted them initial abilities. As they progressed in the game, they would gain points to use to spend on a skill tree for that character. Kaplan said that, near the point of Titan's cancellation, the variety of skills they had in the game led to overpowered combinations, and described the result as "very cluttered and confused."

Shortly after the cancellation announcement, Kotaku ran an article in which they described the game as "a massive multiplayer PC game in which players could both maintain non-combat professions and shoot their way through death-matches on a sci-fi version of Earth." According to the article, which was sourced by anonymous employees who worked on the project, the game would take place on a near-future Earth where the player would take on a "mundane job" during the day while fighting enemies at night.

== Development ==
Blizzard released World of Warcraft (WoW) in 2004, which became one of the leading MMORPGs on the market. By 2006, Blizzard started to concern themselves that a rival publisher would put out its own MMORPG product that would compete for WoW's subscribers, so the company began to consider making the next major MMORPG to beat them to the punch. Blizzard initially considered creating an MMORPG set in the Starcraft universe, however ultimately decided that the lore of that franchise did not fit well into an MMORPG, and instead began incubating concepts of a more grounded science fiction themed game, set in the near future.

Initial development work was led by Rob Pardo and Chris Metzen within the newly-established Team 4 within Blizzard; Metzen and Pardo had previously collaborated on titles like StarCraft: Brood War and World of Warcraft and were major leaders within the company at that point. Kaplan, while still leading The Burning Crusade as the first major World of Warcraft expansion, was frequently pulled into consulting meetings for Titan. Anticipating that Titan would be a major product for Blizzard, the company assembled a large team to work on the game.

Development of Titan began in 2007, and the active phase started at the end of 2007.

The setting of Titan had been established to be in 2070s, taking an optimistic view of the future compared to games with dystopian futures like Half-Life or Fallout. Initially the idea was that players would take the role of superhero-like characters that battled foes to maintain society, and then would spend their down time in casual activities like cooking or running businesses, ideas inspired by games like Animal Crossing, Harvest Moon, and The Sims, as well as activities like driving. The intent was to have all players interacting on one single server instance in a very large open world space, which would be used to siphon players into individual server shards based on their location, according to Kaplan. The world was envisioned to include areas inspired by the western coastline of California, including Los Angeles, San Francisco, and locations in between, and also other locations around the globe like London and Cairo.

Conflict between the vision of Metzen - who wanted to focus on the superhero aspect of the characters - and Pardo - who wanted the characters to be more akin to secret agents or spies - led to lack of focus in early development. The development team also had trouble solidifying the game's main gameplay loop; the team did not consider the game's primary combat to be ready for long-term player engagement, while the developers also could not clearly identify which casual activities players would gravitate towards. This also led to struggles with the art staff, who were designing a large amount of assets as the game's scope and focus constantly changed.

=== Media coverage ===
Early media discovery and reporting about Titan put pressure on the team. Internet users had deduced that Blizzard was working on a "next-gen MMO" as early as 2007, which Blizzard confirmed was not related to WoW; later, in 2008, Activision Blizzard's management including Bobby Kotick and Mike Morhaime affirmed there was a new game in the works. Leaked development schedules for Titan emerged in November 2010, with a targeted 2013 release date.

At the 2010 Spike Video Game Awards, Blizzard co-founder Frank Pearce told gaming blog Destructoid that the studio had begun talking about the title as a recruitment tool. Morhaime spoke of the game in broad terms during a panel discussion at the 2011 D.I.C.E. Summit. He said that the company had its most experienced MMO developers working on the project. He explained that they were using lessons from the years of working on World of Warcraft, and he also emphasized the significance of players gaming with people they know as opposed to strangers. Morhaime believed that World of Warcraft and Titan, upon its release, would be able to co-exist on the market. He had made a similar statement in 2008 when he told Wired magazine that the game would be so different that it would not compete.

In an interview with Gamasutra in March 2011, Sams revealed that the game was playable and laid out a vision for the project to "still be growing strong" in ten, fifteen or twenty years, having "set a new mark in the industry." By September 2012, development had grown from small teams focusing on concepts to a team of over 100 people and Blizzard vice president of game design Rob Pardo said that the game was "in the middle of development", noting that it would be a "very big project that's got a long ways to go".

=== Cancellation ===
By 2009, serious doubts about the viability of the Titan began to emerge within the team. Jeff Kaplan also came to believe that Titan was almost impossible to realize in its existing form. In 2010, Kaplan approached Blizzard’s leadership with a proposal to shut the game down and stop spending money on its further development. However, Blizzard did not cancel the project at that time, and development continued for several more years, until Titan was finally canceled in 2013.

Prior to 2013, Team 4's work had been haphazard, which some members of the development team blamed on Pardo and his seagull management style. Some also attributed the project's lack of focus to Pardo not committing to a vision for Titan, leaving the team chasing many different approaches to see what might work. Before 2013, the team focused on developing a vertical slice to present to Blizzard's management; while the demo showed off the gameplay, but lacked cohesion that linked these mechanics together. Kaplan said that he had started recognize that Titan was likely unrealizable in 2009, as it should have first been fleshed out by a much smaller team using pre-existing assets to demonstrate the concept. He spoke to Mike Morhaime in 2010 suggesting that Titan simply be shut down.

In early 2013, Blizzard held an internal meeting with Team 4, announcing the Titan was being rebooted at the request of Blizzard's management team. Seventy percent of the team was transferred to other projects within Blizzard, a few were laid off, while a small core team, led by Metzen and Jeff Kaplan remained to determine if anything could be salvaged with the Titan assets. The rebooting was publicly announced on May 28, 2013. Blizzard president Mike Morhaime stated that the company was in the process of selecting a new direction for the project and re-envisioning what they want the game to be. He said that the game was "unlikely to be a subscription-based MMORPG", and that there were no official announced or projected release dates. Morhaime noted that Blizzard has gone through this sort of iterative development process with previous games. Pardo took a sabbatical from Blizzard after the reboot was announced, as Blizzard executives considered his management of Titan to be a factor in the reboot, and Pardo eventually left Blizzard in mid-2014.

On September 23, 2014, Morhaime revealed in an interview with Polygon that production of Titan had been cancelled. The cancellation of Titan was estimated to have cost US$80 million over seven years by Blizzard developers. Industry analysts believed that Blizzard recognized that unless Titan offered something significantly compelling over currently-active competing MMOs, it would not have succeeded in the market, and the decision to cancel the project, despite the cost, was a benefit to the company in the long run.

In a 2019 interview, following his departure from Blizzard, Morhaime had stated that Titan was cancelled because the company failed to control the scope of the game. He described Titan as essentially being two games developed in parallel, which created development pipeline problems. Part of the team was working to make the game engine support the ambitions for the title, but this left the content developers idle with no tools to create the gameplay. He and the other Blizzard executives decided that it would be better to cancel the title rather than wrangle it down.

Jason Schreier of Bloomberg News reported that the failure of Titan led Kotick to take more control of Blizzard's operations, creating the start of a schism between Kotick and Morhaime, which ultimately led to Morhaime's departure as Blizzard's president in 2018.

=== Future Name ===
The title Overwatch dates back to the development of Titan. According to Jeff Kaplan, the team once voted on possible names for the Titan, and Overwatch received the most votes. Already after Titan’s cancellation. Before presenting the new game to the company’s management, producer Matt Hawley asked Kaplan to choose a title. Kaplan then settled on Overwatch, using a name that had previously appeared during Titan’s development.

== Transition to Overwatch ==
While Blizzard publicly stated that Titan had been delayed in May 2013 as they refocused its development, the game had already been canceled internally. Of the 140 members on the Titan team, only 40 were kept in a group to develop a new intellectual property, while the others were transitioned into other departments within Blizzard.

The remaining Titan group of 40, which included Kaplan and Chris Metzen, were told they needed to come up with a new idea in about six weeks, or otherwise they too would be transferred to other departments. Taking inspiration from team-based shooters like Team Fortress 2 and the popularity of multiplayer online battle arenas (MOBAs), the team used some of the existing Titan assets to develop a prototype game, where players would select pre-defined hero characters with different types of abilities and skills, and face off in team-based matches. Metzen also said that due to the recent failure of Titan, the group suffered from poor morale, but the idea of a team-based shooter invigorated them, and helped to establish an optimistic narrative taking place in the near-future of Earth, encompassing a range of diverse heroes and characters. The prototype game proved successful, and the team set off to develop what would become Blizzard's fourth major IP, Overwatch. Some Overwatch assets can be traced to their Titan roots, such as the character Tracer, who originally was one of the skins available for the Jumper class in Titan, and the map "Temple of Anubis" that had been developed for Titan. Overwatch was formally announced on November 7, 2014, and released May 24, 2016.

Morhaime stated in 2019 that the decision to take what they had done for Titan but limit its scope with tighter control as to produce Overwatch was one of the best decisions that Blizzard had made.

Later, Blizzard created Overwatch 2, first released in October 2022. While Overwatch 2 carried the PVP elements of Overwatch at launch, the development team said that they were working on a larger PvE mode with hero skill trees and cooperative missions. However, in May 2023, Blizzard announced that they had discontinued the scale of this PvE mode, which initially was an attempt to bring in some of Titan's gameplay back into Overwatch, but which led to unfocused development.
