= Doomfist =

Fictional character in the 2016 video game Overwatch

- Overwatch character
- Doomfist in Overwatch
- First appearance: Overwatch (2017)
- Designed by: Arnold Tsang; David Gibson (animation)
- Voiced by: Sahr Ngaujah

In-universe information
- Class: Tank (Overwatch 2); Damage (Overwatch)
- Nationality: Nigerian

Doomfist, full name Akande Ogundimu, is a character who first appears in the 2016 video game Overwatch, a Blizzard Entertainment–developed first-person hero shooter. His design is based on a powerful, cybernetic gauntlet. As an offensive, brawler-style character, he uses close-range attacks: a charged punch and slam. Doomfist was released in late July 2017 as the title's 25th hero of the franchise, and the fourth introduced after the game's launch.

Overwatch's announcement video, in 2014, contained a stray reference to a gauntlet. Following its obsessive popularity with fans, the developer, Blizzard Entertainment, expanded the gauntlet into a full-fledged, playable character. This period included a series of teasers from the developer and a campaign by actor Terry Crews to voice the character. Doomfist was ultimately voiced by Sahr Ngaujah. In Doomfist's fictional backstory, the playable character became the third generation to wield the gauntlet, and is presented as a villain after killing his predecessor and becoming a leader of Talon, the game's nemesis group. A digital comic accompanied the character's release.

Fans were excited by the character's reveal, and professional players praised the balance of his move set. Other critics considered Doomfist too vulnerable to be viable, and insufficiently exciting to rekindle the interest of old players.

== Description ==
Doomfist plays a "dive tank" role on an Overwatch team. As a tank, his role on a team is to absorb the opponent's damage on his team's behalf. His move set is designed for diving into the opposing team to damage and divert their focus before peeling out of the fray. Doomfist has a brawler move set, using his cybernetic gauntlet, also known as "Doomfist" for close-range, melee attacks. For example, his Rocket Punch is a charged attack that launches Doomfist in the direction of the player's aim. It does extra damage if it pummels the enemy into a wall. It is useful for finishing enemies in retreat as well as pushing enemies off edges. The Seismic Slam performs a smashing dive to return to the ground. His only non-melee attack is the short-range Hand Cannon, which shoots a shotgun burst of projectiles from his left hand. Its four shots of ammunition regenerate passively. Doomfist's passive ability gives him extra shields when he deals damage with his abilities. His "ultimate ability", Meteor Strike, launches Doomfist into the air to drop down on a targeted area, and complements other ultimate abilities that pull enemies together, such as Zarya's Graviton Surge. (Note: Examples of characters with ultimate abilities that pull enemies together (also known as "crowd-control" ultimates) include Zarya, Mei, and Reinhardt.)

These moves are designed to be cycled, and chained together into high speed combos. These skills apply stun, and often end up killing the enemy. For example, you can punch an enemy into a wall, shoot your shotgun primary fire into the opponent's head, and finish them with a quick melee. You can also cycle these moved by soft engaging to bait out enemy cooldowns, disengaging, waiting for your moves to be back up, and then diving with your entire team. Though, it is still very nuanced..

Among his advantages, his move combinations contribute to his high mobility, compared to other Overwatch playable characters. Doomfist can easily reach and neutralize enemies occupying high ground, such as snipers. He is most effective against low-mobility opponents, but susceptible to high-mobility opponents, and opponents with crowd control (stun) abilities. such as Pharah, Sombra, Roadhog, etc. Among his disadvantages, Doomfist is dependent on his abilities to escape groups of enemies, leaving the player helpless when his abilities are unavailable (on cooldown or hacked by Sombra). Doomfist's large "hitbox", or area for taking damage, disadvantages him to characters such as Reaper, Roadhog, and Ana's sleep dart.

In professional games, he works best when flanking the enemy team and isolating single opponents out of position. At his release, he was expected to fit well in the "dive" team compositions popular in professional play, in which aggressive characters such as Genji and Winston harass the enemy at close range. He was also expected to counterbalance diving enemies through the stun generated from his empowered punch, and removing them from the fight. Doomfist was anticipated to perform well on most levels/maps, especially in those with close quarters. Stationary barrier characters (such as Reinhardt and Orisa), though popular in professional team compositions, cannot protect Doomfist, who instead benefits more from Zarya's barrier bubble ability.

Some of the character's costume customization options ("skins") relate to his fictional cultural heritage, such as the orisha gods of the Yoruba religion and the African ceremonial mask tradition. Doomfist's other aesthetic customization options allude to the boxer Muhammad Ali, fighting video games, martial arts, pop culture references.

In March 2022, Blizzard confirmed that Doomfist's role will be changed to a tank in Overwatch 2. Doomfist's Uppercut was eliminated, replaced by a Power Block ability that will let him absorb frontal damage for a short time. His other offensive abilities are weakened to a degree but he was given more health to reflect his tank status. Blizzard explained that rather than having to heavily refine Doomfist's offensive capabilities which had become overpowered, transitioning him to a tank still made him a threatening force that could break up defensive groups. In 2026, Doomfist was one of several characters included in the Blizzard-developed mobile game Overwatch Rush, now sporting a beard.

== Development ==
External videos
- The 2014 cinematic, in which the game was first announced and Doomfist's gauntlet first appeared
- Doomfist character preview with developer commentary

Doomfist was a stray reference in Overwatch's original animated short whose obsessive popularity with fans led the development team to expand his lore with in-game references in the game's Numbani map. In the cinematic video used to announce the game in 2014, a boy is excited to see Doomfist's gauntlet on display behind glass at the Overwatch museum. Doomfist's gauntlet was a plot device, and the developers had not planned to create a character to wield it. Overwatch Creative Director Chris Metzen played with compound nouns to give the gauntlet a name reminiscent of a shotgun. The developers expanded the gauntlet into a Doomfist character in bits. In particular, they decided to use the gauntlet as the centerpiece for the game's Numbani environment, in which the gauntlet is encased in the map's objective, the payload, to be delivered to a Doomfist exhibit at a museum. By late 2015, the team decided Doomfist would be a generational hero, like that of superhero universes, were he to be a full-fledged playable character, the fourth additional character to be added to game, and 25th on the roster.

In designing the character, Blizzard's Geoff Goodman said they crafted Doomfist as an "ode to the fighting genre", both in his skill kit and in concept art. Though Blizzard tried to keep all of his attacks as melee, they found, as they had with Genji, that Doomfist needed some type of ranged attack to make him playable; an early attack had been a phantom punch that would have been launched from his fist. Doomfist had also been considered as a Tank class, but Blizzard did not want to make the mistake again of having a high-health character with powerful attacks as they had initially with Roadhog at the game's introduction. At one point during development, Doomfist would have been able to pick up enemies and use them as human shields or to throw them, but Blizzard dropped this as he was not supposed to be a wrestler or luchador, according to Goodman. They also dropped an ability for him to grab pieces of the ground and throw them. His ultimate ability was originally designed for Orisa, the character introduced prior to Doomfist.

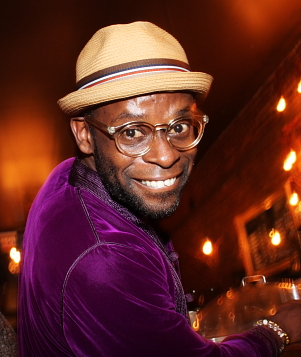
Doomfist voice actor Sahr Ngaujah, pictured in 2012

Actor and former American football player Terry Crews generated support on social media in his bid to voice the character, which included a mock audition, a visit to the developer's headquarters, an endorsement from fellow actor Dwayne Johnson, and a fan campaign. The character was ultimately voiced by Sahr Ngaujah, who previously appeared in Money Monster and Stomp the Yard. The accent used for Doomfist has been described as West African. Blizzard's Michael Chu explained that when they were casting for Doomfist specifically looking for "something very specific given his role in the game", Ngaujah's audition significantly impressed them, along with his ability to deliver many different "flavors" that they needed for the character. Crews ultimately felt that Ngaujah was a better fit for Doomfist, and was pleased to have been included, instead, in Microsoft's Crackdown 3. Chu did not rule out using Crews elsewhere within Overwatch.

In the lead-up to Blizzard's official announcement of the playable character, the developers teased his release by modifying the Doomfist gauntlet in Numbani to appear to be stolen from its glass case. Blizzard finally confirmed the Doomfist's development with a teaser trailer in early July 2017, a week after news of the release leaked through the game's crash logs. The reveal cinematic was drawn in an anime-style by Wolf Smoke Studio, based in Shanghai, who had previously expressed and rallied interest in developing an anime in the game's fictional universe. Blizzard also sent an official Doomfist cosplayer to San Diego Comic-Con and Overwatch World Cup Sydney qualifier. Soon after the reveal, Doomfist became playable on the game's test servers, where some of the character's powers were rebalanced to reduce punch distance and vertical mobility. The character was released for all platforms on July 27, 2017.

== Lore ==
External videos
- Doomfist origin story, an official, animated short

Doomfist is presented as a "generational" character who, like the Green Lantern or the Flash, has passed through two generational eras in which he was known to the fictional world as Adhabu Ngumi, "The Savior" and Akinjide Adeyemi, "The Scourge". The playable Doomfist, Akande Ogundimu, is the character's third incarnation, labeled "The Successor" as the third person to be called "Doomfist".

Doomfist is one of the villains of the Overwatch fictional universe. In the backstory of the third Doomfist, Akande Ogundimu is presented as the villainous heir to a prosthetics company in Nigeria who splits his time between expanding the company and martial arts training. During the game's "Omnic War" between humans and rogue Omnic robots, Ogundimu lost his right arm. His prosthetic replacement impressed the second Doomfist, who then trained Ogundimu as his successor, but the student later killed his teacher to claim the gauntlet for himself. Ogundimu became a leader of the Talon group, the nemesis organization to Overwatch, and advocates for his belief that forces of conflict will strengthen humanity. At some point prior to the game's present, Overwatch's Winston, a playable character from the game, defeats Doomfist and puts the titular gauntlet behind glass in the Overwatch museum, as referenced in the original Overwatch announcement video. Blizzard's first teaser for Doomfist's release shows a fictional news report about Talon freeing Doomfist from prison to steal the gauntlet. Blizzard had modified the Numbani level during its release of Orisa, the previous playable character released for the game, to imply that Doomfist had attacked the city and stolen the gauntlet; notably, the payload casing had been broken open and the gauntlet missing.

A digital comic accompanied the playable character's release, featuring Doomfist in a James Bond-esque casino setting. Masquerade establishes the character's motivations and competition following his release from prison.

Recently, Doomfist was overthrown as the leader of Talon by Vendetta, in a 1 on 1 battle between the two. Vendetta ended up amputating Doomfist's right arm in the fight, taking the Doomfist gauntlet with it. Doomfist seems to be plotting to take back Talon, but he is not sure how to as of yet.

== Reception ==
Upon Doomfist's official announcement, Kotaku reported the fan reaction as "beyond excited". Fan anticipation for the character rivaled that for Sombra, a character released the previous year with a prolonged reveal period. Players had hoped for the release of Doomfist each time Blizzard had revealed an additional character for the game. Fans who had lobbied for Terry Crews to play Doomfist's voice were disappointed to discover his absence, but Sahr Ngaujah's performance was praised at the time of Doomfist's formal unveiling, and fans received the character positively anyway. Doomfist also fulfilled Overwatch's sore lack of a supervillain, according to IGN, in a cast of other morally ambiguous but tragic and redeemable characters. The critic anticipated Doomfist as the start of Blizzard making Talon into a villainous organization à la Legion of Doom (Justice League) or Masters of Evil (Avengers).

Writing for Hardcore Gamer, Spencer Rutledge opined that "having Doomfist representing his African heritage in the best of ways, Overwatch is making sure to stay at the forefront of representation."
