= Echo (Overwatch) =

Fictional character in the 2016 video game Overwatch

- Overwatch character
- Echo's appearance in Overwatch
- First game: Overwatch (2020)
- Voiced by: Jeannie Bolet; Lauren Tom (Reunion)

In-universe information
- Class: Damage

Echo is a character who first appeared in the 2016 video game Overwatch, a Blizzard Entertainment–developed first-person hero shooter.

== Conception and development ==
Echo was the 32nd Hero to be introduced to Overwatch in March 2020. She started as a planned character for Titan, though initially was more functional and less human-like, with her more human appearance coming about by the fourth iteration of her design. Her design had always been very light and elegant, so she was envisioned to be a support character at the start. But once they established the character's name as Echo, implying what her abilities may be including her Duplicate ultimate, this made the choice of a support role a poor one, as during the use of Duplicate her teammates would not have her normal support abilities. By making her a damage hero, this did not interfere with the team's support roles, nor overlapped extensively with Pharah, an existing flying hero who does not have as significant control over her flying movements as Echo.

== Appearances ==
Echo is a female gynoid created by Dr. Mina Liao after the Omnic Crisis. Dr. Liao was one of the scientists that had created the Omnics while part of the Omnica Corporation, and who had joined the newly-found Overwatch to deal with the Omnic Crisis. She had created Echo as part of the Echo Project as a more benevolent artificial intelligence to try to overcome her guilt for creating the more harmful Omnics, hoping that AI could be used to save humanity. After an attack on Overwatch headquarters killed Dr. Liao, Echo took on part of Dr. Liao's personality, and thus became "her promise, her legacy, her Echo". After being quarantined for many years, Echo is soon reawakened by Cole Cassidy to join the reformed Overwatch team.

Prior to her announcement, Echo had also appeared in the animated short Reunion, released alongside Ashe's reveal as the 29th hero. Ashe attempts to steal her while she is in a state of hibernation, but she is rescued by Cassidy. When reactivated, Cassidy informs her of Winston's recall of Overwatch agents. She was also shown in the teaser cinematic for Overwatch 2, joining Winston's recall of other Overwatch members to fight new threats. At the time of the Overwatch 2 reveal, Kaplan stated Blizzard planned to introduce Echo as a playable hero at some point in the future. Echo was announced on March 18, 2020, available to players on the PTR the following day, and unlocked for all players on April 14, 2020. Kaplan anticipated that Echo would be the last character to be added to Overwatch's roster until the release of Overwatch 2.

Echo is voiced by Jeannie Bolet.

=== Gameplay ===
Her primary attack is a Tri-Shot that is a set of three projectiles at a time, and she can fire a Sticky Bomb that does initial damage on striking a target and then after a short time explodes that does damage in a small area. She also has a Focusing Beam that damages a target in the beam, with damage intensified for targets that are below half-health, including barriers. She also has a Flight ability that can launch her into the air, and her Glide passive ability allows her to hover and descend at a controlled rate with good horizontal control. Her ultimate ability is Duplicate, which allows Echo to take the appearance and ability of any Hero on the opposing team (save for Echo) for 15 seconds, with an accelerated ultimate gain rate.

== Promotion and reception ==
Prior to her release as a playable character, Echo attracted attention following her appearance in the 2018 animated short Reunion. Writing for Polygon, Cass Marshall noted that while the character would not be released immediately following the teaser, speculation grew around her role and gameplay in the future, particularly due to how little actually information they had regarding her. Joseph Franco in a subsequent article described her as gorgeous, adding that "with that much development and thought put into her, she has to be important" to the franchise's lore. Fan theories arose around her, with Franco highlighting one that revolved around a possible relationship to the game's Temple of Anubis location and the Omnic Crisis, and the various directions the game's story could proceed.

According to Adrian Lai of IGN, some praised the use of Singlish, but others pointed out inaccuracies in pronunciations. Tarvin Gill of Mashable compared the pronunciation to "an English person trying very hard to fit in", and suggested some of the issue may have lied in Jennie Bolet's upbringing in Liverpool, England, when hiring a Singaporean or Malaysian voice actor may have been a better option. Meanwhile, Teo Kai Xiang of The Straits Times stated that "netizens cringed at her distinctly foreign way of saying Singlish", saying that while it showed a growing trend of awareness regarding Singapore's unique accent, the execution often fell short. In another article, he cited it as an example of creating a fictional idea of Singapore by not including its people in the production.

Marion Frayna of Geek Culture offered a different perspective, stating that Singaporeans were actually excited by the character's introduction. She praised the authenticity of the voice lines and how many of them referenced cultural phrases from the country such as "Alamak!" to express surprise or more English-based phrases such as "Can or Not?". Frayna further praised how some of her cosmetic sprays referenced local flora or cultural dishes such as Chilli Crab, while similar references were integrated into her skins such as the "Papaya" and "Durian" in both their naming and color schemes. She hoped to see more references integrated into the character through cosmetics or voice lines, expressing that in her view language was the best way to represent one's culture.

Anastasia Maillot in an article for TheGamer praised her visual design, stating that at the time female Damage class characters were a rarity and enjoying that not only was her backstory compelling, and that it was good to "look at the mere character design of Echo, and appreciate how unique and wonderful she is". At the same time, she observed how many expected her to be classified as a Support character based on her appearance, and illustrated the game's unbalanced nature of having an overabundance of Damage characters. Aaron Alford writing for HotSpawn similarly criticized Echo's role classification, expressing that Echo represented the development team's overreliance on damage-focused characters, and her status as the last character added to the first Overwatch game made some feel punished for playing roles outside of Damage, in turn reducing interest in playing those roles.
