= Winston (Overwatch) =

Fictional character in the 2016 video game Overwatch

- Overwatch character
- Winston as he appears in Overwatch
- First game: Overwatch (2016)
- Created by: Arnold Tsang
- Designed by: Arnold Tsang; Ben Zhang (weapon)
- Voiced by: Crispin Freeman

In-universe information
- Class: Tank
- Origin: Horizon Lunar Colony

Winston is a character developed by Blizzard Entertainment for their Overwatch franchise. He was introduced at launch in their 2016 first-person hero shooter video game of the same name and again appeared in its 2022 sequel, Overwatch 2. Winston is one of the more prominent characters used by Blizzard in Overwatch media outside of the video game; the character made an appearance in the game's cinematic trailer and is the focus of an animated short released by Blizzard. Crispin Freeman voices Winston in English-language media.

Within the Overwatch narrative, the character is a genetically engineered gorilla that was part of a larger group used by the in-universe Horizon Lunar Colony to test the effects of prolonged habitation in space.

== Conception and development ==
Early in Overwatch's development, they wanted to push the envelope for what a playable hero character in the game could be. Lead concept artist Arnold Tsang proposed a design called "Orangutank". The design team and director Jeff Kaplan liked the idea, but were unsure how it would fit into the game overall, resulting in a back and forth between the game design team and the art design team. Tsang meanwhile added other elements, such as the fact the character could talk, and that he came from the moon. Meanwhile, through the back and forth of ideas it was considered for the character to have a Dr. Jekyll and Mr. Hyde aspect.

Lead writer Michael Chu described Winston as the character they kept coming back to when trying to find the game's emotional center. Winston is portrayed by Crispin Freeman, whose voice is pitched down for the character.

=== Design ===
Winston stands approximately 7 feet 3 inches (221 cm) tall, though normally is crouched at 5 ft 7 in (170 cm). In the original pitch meeting image for Overwatch, his weapon was described as a flak shotgun.

Like other characters in Overwatch, Winston has cosmetics that players may equip onto him, including different skin designs. One such cosmetic was an emote included as a nod to a deaf Overwatch fan. Meanwhile, when developing skins for the character, they felt his nature lent itself to more light-hearted designs that would still honor his personality and backstory. One of which, "Explorer", gives him a safari-themed outfit and handlebar mustache, and was designed to tie both into his primate character as well as his love for exploration and discovery.

== Appearances ==
In Overwatch lore, Winston is a 29-year old genetically engineered gorilla. A scientist and adventurer, Winston was formerly based in the Horizon Lunar Colony, located on the Moon. The Horizon Lunar Colony was established by Luncheng Interstellar as part of humanity's space exploration; some of its first inhabitants were genetically enhanced gorillas, like Winston, used in tests relating to prolonged space habitation. Due to displaying rapid brain development from the experiment's gene therapy, Winston was taken under Dr. Harold Winston's wing; Dr. Winston taught the young gorilla about science and inspired Winston about human ingenuity. The other gorillas soon led an uprising and killed the colony's scientists, claiming it as their own. Winston took the name of his caretaker, created a rocket and flew to Earth where he would join Overwatch. While in Overwatch, Winston invented the chronal accelerator, which helped fellow Overwatch member Tracer maintain control of her time; before this, Tracer suffered from a chronal dissociation which kept her from keeping a physical form in the present.

Both Overwatch and its sequel lack a standard story or campaign mode and Blizzard disseminates its lore elements in-game through map and environment design, voice lines, and limited-time player versus environment (PvE) game modes. One such example of this was the addition of the "Horizon Lunar Colony" assault map to the game in 2017. The map is the setting for flashback scenes in Recall, an animated short film featuring Winston; some elements featured in Recall were included in the design of the map. Later that year, Blizzard included the "Yeti Hunt" game mode as part of their "Winter Wonderland" seasonal event. The mode featured Winston and Mei, with a yeti-themed skin for Winston coming into play. In April 2019, the game's "Storm Rising" event featured a PvE game mode which included Winston as a playable character.

Winston made an appearance in Blizzard's 2014 cinematic trailer for Overwatch. Winston also appeared in Recall, the first of a series of animated Overwatch shorts released by Blizzard. In the Recall short, Winston is seen recalling memories of his days in Overwatch, as well as his extended Horizon Lunar Colony backstory. Additionally, Winston fights back against an attack from Talon, a terrorist organization opposed to Overwatch, and seeking to eliminate former Overwatch members. Winston is attacked at his home and laboratory. In previous events within Overwatch's lore, the Overwatch organization ended with the United Nations' Petras Act, making any Overwatch-related activities illegal. However, at the end of the short, Winston initiates a recall in an effort to bring back Overwatch. The events of the cinematic trailer follow the events in Recall; Talon agents Widowmaker and Reaper attempt to steal the "Doomfist" weapon, used by many villains in Overwatch lore. Winston and Tracer battle Widowmaker and Reaper, before stopping the two from successfully stealing the weapon.

Shortly prior to the release of Overwatch, Blizzard also featured Winston in a cinematic teaser uploaded onto YouTube to promote the game's open beta period. The video included Winston retelling details about the history of the Overwatch organization.

Winston was later included in an anime-styled video featuring the origin story for the Overwatch villain Doomfist, released in July 2017.

Winston appeared in Reflections, the tenth issue of Overwatch, a digitally released comic series that ties into the events of the video game and animations. The winter holiday-themed issue features Winston lamenting about spending the holiday season alone. Tracer and her girlfriend, Emily then surprise Winston and spend the night celebrating the holidays with him.

Winston was later featured in Winston's Journey to the West, a comic in the form of a tapestry. The tapestry was illustrated by SHISHIO. Inspired by the 16th century Chinese novel, Journey to the West, the tapestry was released as part of the game's "Year of the Rooster" event, celebrating the 2017 Lunar New Year. It was released digitally both on the Overwatch blog, as well as an animation on Madefire, where one can scroll down to continue viewing. The tapestry uses visuals and music to tell its story. The narrative of this tapestry involves Winston recollecting Dr. Harold Winston reading Journey to the West to him during his days on the Horizon Lunar Colony. Winston imagines himself and other characters as the characters from the novel; Winston himself is imagined as Sun Wukong, also known as the Monkey King in the novel.

In December 2017, Winston was featured alongside Mei in a comic titled Yeti Hunt, serving as a tie-in to the "Winter Wonderland" seasonal game mode.

=== Gameplay ===
In Overwatch, Winston is classified as a Tank-class character, designed to absorb large amounts of damage from the enemy team in team compositions while protecting their teammates. Specifically, he is intended to be a "dive" or "engage" tank, meant to get behind the enemy's front line and do significant damage. Winston is armed with a tesla cannon that generates bolts of electricity that will attach themselves to and damage enemies within range as long as the firing button is held down. In Overwatch 2, the cannon gained a secondary firing mode, which fires a beam of energy after holding the alternate firing button for a short period.

Winston also has several abilities that require activation, though have a "cooldown" period after use, and are unable to be used again during that duration. "Jump Pack" allows Winston to fly briefly into the air, giving him increased maneuverability. Meanwhile, "Barrier Projector" creates a bubble-shaped shield where the generator is placed, allowing him to protect himself and allies within its radius from outside attacks for a period of time. Lastly his 'ultimate' ability, called "Primal Rage", requires to charging before use. The ability charges slowly during the course of gameplay, and can be charged faster through damage dealt to the enemy team. Once the ability meter is full, the ability can be activated to cause Winston to fly into a berserk rage for a period of time, swinging his arms about as his primary attack while his Jump Pack's cooldown is drastically reduced. Enemies hit by his attacks will be moved from their current position while he is in this state.

== Promotion and reception ==
In 2016, the Jinx clothing line released T-shirts featuring Winston. Players who purchased the Origins Edition of Overwatch receive a "baby Winston" battle pet, based on his appearance in the Recall cinematic, in World of Warcraft; these players will also receive a player avatar of Winston for StarCraft II.

The staff of Games.sina.com.cn considered him one of Blizzard Entertainment's best heroic characters due to his portrayal of constantly protecting others. In another article, they examined some of the imagery behind his character. In this manner, they suggested some inspiration behind his character may have come from King Kong, particularly his friendship with Tracer being a more benign parallel. Other similarities were drawn to Marvel Comics characters Hulk and Beast, intellectuals shown to be able to fly into devastating rages. They further enjoyed that compared to other depictions of scientists in media, Winston was portrayed as well accepted and loved by his friends in Overwatch, and the subtle implications indicated between the group around him.

Writing for Kill Screen, Reid McCarter felt that Winston represented "a gorilla in a cage too smart to be treated like any other animal" through the duality of his more genteel personality and his enraged state. Describing the former as very collected and cerebral, he saw the latter as Winston allowing himself to be "the animal everyone thinks he is. When that happens, it's nice. It makes you want to give him a cheer". Ryu Jong-hwa of Korean website Gamemeca meanwhile observed the contrast between Winston's strength in the franchise's lore and his role as a "gentle tank" in game, with the latter indicating him to be one of the world's strongest heroes due to his rage overpowering Doomfist. He was curious to see if this aspect of the character would be displayed in game at some point, though felt it was unlikely after Overwatch 2 had decided against its PvE gameplay modes.

The Daily Dot writer Joseph Knoop praised how Winston seemed to be one of the few heroes that represented Blizzard's design statement for Overwatch that their world was inspired by heroes, villains, and scientists, and enjoyed that the character seemed to carry the lessons of his mentor, daring to see the world as it could be. Researchers Joong-Gon Lee and Tae-Gu Lee in a paper for the Journal of Korea Game Society described Winston as fitting Jean Baudrillard's concept of imitation, stating that while he clearly resembled a gorilla, his additional aspects helped him transcend the basic idea of one. They further called him a simulacrum of a gorilla, and considered him a separate and more valuable concept than his base.

Felipe Antônio de Souza in a dissertation for the Federal University of Santa Catarina examined the characters of Overwatch through the scope of social semiotics. In regards to Winston, he pointed out how his "Thinker" victory pose was a strong fit for his character, considering it a "visual symbol of intellect, philosophy and reflection" that reflected a construction of his own identity and along with the character's other symbolism made him a "remarkable character". de Souza further stated that some elements such as his "Yeti" skin helped highlight his personality as a kind individual with anger issues, reflecting the mythology around the creature. Additionally, much of Winston's language was also observed to be an intentional tool that allowed the player to both relate to his rational and emotional sides.

After the release of the character Wuyang, media outlets asked Blizzard if they had begun shifting towards more conventionally attractive characters and away from "oddball" heroes, specifically characters like Winston. Though Blizzard later clarified that "oddball" character designs were still in development, some fans and journalists voice their concern for abandoning such concepts, feeling they were integral to Overwatch's character design. Tobi Stouffer of ComicBook.com pointed out that characters like Winston were defined by the extraordinary circumstances around them, and helped set the cast apart from titles such as Valorant, adding "shifting away from characters like Winston is a deviation from one of the things that made, and still makes, Overwatch stand out from its peers". He expressed further that one of Overwatch's strengths lied in how it made characters like Winston relatable through its narrative design, acknowledging it was likely a difficult achievement.
