= Jeff Kaplan =

American video game designer (born 1972)

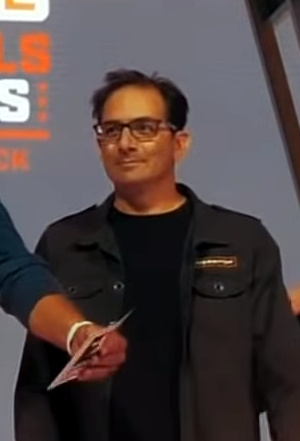
- Kaplan at the 2019 OWL Grand Finals
- Born: 1972 (age 53–54); New Jersey, U.S.
- Education: University of Southern California (BA); New York University (MA)
- Occupation: Video game designer
- Employer(s): Blizzard Entertainment (2002–2021); Kintsugiyama (2022–present)
- Title: Vice President of Blizzard Entertainment (formerly); Co-founder and Game Director at Kintsugiyama (as of 2022)

Jeffrey Kaplan is an American video game designer who founded game developer Kintsugiyama and is the game director for their upcoming game The Legend of California. He was formerly vice president of Blizzard Entertainment, a position he held until he left the company in 2021. During his time with Blizzard, he was most known for designing elements of World of Warcraft and was the lead director of Overwatch (2016).

== Early life ==
Kaplan was born in New Jersey, and grew up in La Cañada Flintridge, California. Kaplan had been an avid video game player during his school years, particularly influenced by the various Infocom adventure games; however, lacking programming skills, he never thought he would be able to get a career in the video game industry. He initially pursued a degree in film, but ultimately got a degree in creative writing at the University of Southern California. After working as a writing intern for Universal Pictures, he decided to get a graduate degree for creative writing from New York University. Following this, he worked for his father's recruiting business while performing creative writing on the side to try to get his stories published. He was unsuccessful at getting any of his creative stories published for several years, receiving over 170 rejection notices in a single year. By 2000, he decided to drop creative writing, and spent his time playing video games, as well as toying around with the level editors from games like Duke Nukem 3D and Half-Life.

== Career ==
=== Early career and involvement with Blizzard ===
Kaplan became involved in the massively multiplayer online game (MMO) EverQuest. Under his online handle "Tigole Bitties", he joined the "Legacy of Steel" guild, and became a well-recognized player for his accomplishments and his commentary about the game posted to the guild's website. He discussed some of his map making attempts which caught the attention of the guild's leader, Rob Pardo, who at the time was the lead designer at Blizzard for Warcraft III; Kaplan was aware that some of his guild members worked at Blizzard, but he had not recognized the importance of the company at that point. Around 2001, Pardo invited Kaplan to come visit Blizzard's offices in Irvine, during which he was introduced to several other Blizzard guild members, and they showed him the yet-unannounced MMO World of Warcraft (WoW) project they had been working on. Several similar meetings happened over the next few months. Later, after World of Warcraft was announced, Pardo suggested that Kaplan apply for a recently posted job for a WoW quest designer there; Kaplan realized that the job description was tailor-made for his background, and that his previous visit to Blizzard had been an informal job interview. Kaplan applied and was hired into Blizzard by May 2002.

=== World of Warcraft development ===
Kaplan's initial work at Blizzard was helping with quality assurance for Warcraft III: Reign of Chaos in the weeks prior to its release. After Warcraft III shipped, he joined with the WoW team as one of the first two quest designers along with Pat Nagle, and worked closely with the game's creative director Chris Metzen. Kaplan's work focused on the player versus environment elements of WoW, including quest design and the overall aesthetics for the various dungeons and raids; he described his position as a "medium" between Metzen's creative elements and the programmers and artists of the level design team. Eventually, Kaplan was named as game director for WoW, along with Tom Chilton and J. Allen Brack.

=== Transition to Titan ===
In February 2009, Kaplan announced that he was stepping down as game director for WoW to switch his role at Blizzard to a new, unannounced MMO, which later was revealed as Titan. Kaplan opted to join the new project, hoping to create a similar success to what WoW had been, as well as having concerns how long WoW's popularity would remain. Titan was considered an ambitious project, designed as a extremely personalized MMO that features various mechanics from many different genres, but had a prolonged and struggling development period along with gameplay that Kaplan called "very cluttered and confused". Titan's cancellation was officially announced in September 2014.

=== Creation of Overwatch ===
However, prior to Titan's official cancellation, the game's development had been stopped in early 2013 at Blizzard. All but 40 members of the Titan team were reassigned to other projects, with the remaining people, including Kaplan and Metzen, tasked by management to come up with a new intellectual property within a few weeks, or otherwise they would also be reassigned. Kaplan and Metzen led this team to take some of the gameplay and creative elements of Titan and created a team-based shooter, which became Overwatch. With the project approved by Blizzard, Kaplan became the game's lead director with Metzen serving as creative director. Overwatch became extremely successful for Blizzard, earning more than $1 billion in revenue within its first year, and having drawn more than 35 million players worldwide. Taking a cue from fellow Blizzard employee and lead director for Hearthstone, Ben Brode, Kaplan made himself the public face for Blizzard in promoting and interacting with fans of Overwatch; he regularly posted to the Overwatch online forums, and created several videos giving insight into Overwatch's development and future updates.

In 2017, Kaplan was awarded with the Vanguard Award at the Fun & Serious Game Festival in Bilbao.

=== Departure from Blizzard ===
Blizzard announced on April 20, 2021 that Kaplan was leaving the company after 19 years, with Aaron Keller to take over Kaplan's role in the oversight of Overwatch. In a 2026 interview, Kaplan stated that his departure was from pressure put on his team in the wake of the downturn in the Overwatch League around 2020. Activision and Blizzard expected more from his plans for Overwatch 2 to make more features amenable for the League and to aggressively seek monetization options, giving little room to develop new features for the game. A Blizzard CFO told Kaplan that if Overwatch 2 failed to reach certain financial goals in 2021 and for some years beyond they would fire a thousand people and blame Kaplan for it. He opted to leave following that meeting.

A tribute to Kaplan was planned to be included in Overwatch 2 by the name of a background storefront "Jephs Corner Pizza" in the New York City map. However, the reference was seemingly removed after Blizzard implemented a new policy against including references to real-world people in their games.

=== Founding of Kintsugiyama, and The Legend of California ===
In March 2026, Kaplan appeared on Lex Fridman's podcast, marking his first public appearance since his departure from Blizzard. In the interview, he revealed that he was working on The Legend of California, an open-world first-person shooter developed by his new independent game studio, Kintsugiyama. The game is being published by Dreamhaven, the company formed by former Blizzard co-founder Michael Morhaime, and is scheduled to enter early access in 2026.

== Games ==
Year	Title	Role	Notes
2002	Warcraft III: Reign of Chaos	Tester	
2004	World of Warcraft	Game Designer, Quest Designer, Lead Designer	
2007	World of Warcraft: The Burning Crusade	Lead Designer	
2008	World of Warcraft: Wrath of the Lich King	Game Director	
2013	Titan	Lead Designer	Cancelled
2016	Overwatch	Game Director, Vice President	Left Blizzard in 2021
TBA	The Legend of California	Game Director	Currently in development
