= Jetpack Cat =

- Overwatch character
- Jetpack Cat's appearance in Overwatch
- First game: Overwatch (2026)
- Designed by: Bobby Kim
- Voiced by: Jennifer Hale

In-universe information
- Species: Tabby cat
- Class: Support
- Origin: Gibraltar

Jetpack Cat is the call sign of Fika, a character who first appeared in the 2023 video game Overwatch, a Blizzard Entertainment–developed first-person hero shooter that was added to the game's roster in a 2026 update. A member of the global peacekeeping task force Overwatch, she is a rotund, orange tabby cat wearing a blue jetpack with controls designed to resemble cat toys. She was conceived early on in the development of the original game as a character intended to be like a real-life cat, which was turned down after lead director Jeff Kaplan felt it was "probably too far."

Jetpack Cat was first shown at Blizzcon 2017, and in Overwatch, she was designed with the intention of contrasting her with other animal characters like Winston and Wrecking Ball, who had human-level intelligence. They aimed to make her feel smarter than she seemed, like people may view their own cats. Jetpack Cat was designed by Bobby Kim, and is voiced by Jennifer Hale. She has been generally well-received, a long-awaited character before her reveal in-game. Critics discussed how her abilities and mannerisms made her feel like a cat, and according to Polygon, she was a dominant force in competitive Overwatch gameplay. Meanwhile, players assumed that she may be a spy or villain due to her high cognitive abilities and motor skills, a theory later confirmed in the franchise's webtoon series where it is revealed she is spying on Overwatch for the Chinese company Lucheng Interstellar.

== Concept and creation ==
Early on when working on the first Overwatch game, a hero shooter video game developed by Blizzard Entertainment, director Jeff Kaplan and the development team wanted to push the intellectual property as far as they could with character designs. One idea proposed amongst the team was a jetpack with a cat lying in it, idly pawing at the controls. Its behavior was intended to be similar to a real-life cat, particularly how they tend to knock over items when bored. While there was much debate internally amongst the team on whether to include the character, Kaplan felt they ultimately agreed "Yeah that's probably too far," and he himself was unsure if seeing "those little cat paws" in the game's first-person perspective would work. Jetpack Cat was later mentioned again however by lead writer Michael Chu, who suggested he had been considering the character, possibly in relation to another character, Torbjorn.

At Blizzcon 2017, Kaplan and artist Arnold Tsang showcased early unused designs for Jetpack Cat when discussing character planning, which showed two unique designs, one that matched the laid-back concept that Kaplan had earlier discussed, while the other was a more forward leaning cat with sunglasses wearing the jetpack on a harness. While he reiterated his belief the designs were a poor match for the fictional universe they were developing, several other animal-jetpack design combinations were also revealed at this time, including a monkey with a flamethrower, a gargoyle, a four-legged simian mech, and what was described as "a creepy kid with a goatee" whose head was on fire.

In February 2026, they decided to implement the character into Overwatch, as part of a major overhaul of the game to try to revitalize the game's narrative approach. With Jetpack Cat, the development team sought to mirror the success of the number of heroes being introduced in Marvel Rivals. Art director Dion Rogers pushed a hard requirement that the character had to be "cute enough". Jetpack Cat's design was done by concept artist Bobby Kim. When working out the character, they wanted to avoid re-treading what they had created with other playable animal characters in Overwatch, namely Winston and Wrecking Ball who were intelligent and spoke due to scientific experiments or additional equipment. Instead, they wanted something that would fit more with how players saw their own cats, specifically something "smarter than they appear".

=== Design ===
The cat itself was designed to be a rotund, orange tabby cat. While they maintained a cat's shape, some liberties were taken to make the design more believable, such as more flexible shoulders and dilated eyes, the latter of which done with the intention of making her also more adorable. The jetpack meanwhile was designed to be a blue harness with thrusters extending upwards from the sides, cannons on each side of the cat, and a control panel on the front. The controls were modeled and colored in a way to resemble cat toys, while the jetpack itself used round surfaces to indicate it as technology belonging to the setting's peacekeeping group Overwatch. They felt the jetpack's design did the heavy lifting in allowing the character to seem less out of place.

Jetpack Cat's overall size went through several iterations, as the developers did not want to make it too big to be an easy target, but making it too small would make targeting it difficult for players. Its speed was another issue, as they saw fast movement as an integral part of the character's overall gameplay.

== Appearances ==
Fika is a large stray cat introduced in the 2023 first person hero shooter Overwatch 2 in a 2026 update for the title. She was found by the character Brigitte in the Gibraltar base of Overwatch, a global peacekeeping task force, and was given the Swedish name "Fika" because she reminded Brigitte of a kanelbulle pastry. Due to finding her between some discarded rocket parts, Brigitte was inspired to explore a concept of strapping a jetpack to a housecat she had drafted years prior. Though the design had some complications due to Fika's lack of opposable thumbs, it was completed, and she now assists Overwatch under the callsign Jetpack Cat.

The character is voiced by Jennifer Hale, and the entirety of her dialogue are variations of cat meows. In February 2026, a special mode titled ";ASKLDFAL;S C;A" was added to Overwatch's arcade mode, in which all players are made to use Jetpack Cat only. Since her introduction, fans suspected she may be a spy or possible villain due to her high cognitive abilities and motor skills. In Overwatch's webtoon series, the former was confirmed as it is revealed she is spying on Overwatch for Chinese company Lucheng Interstellar.

=== Gameplay ===
In Overwatch, Jetpack Cat is classified as a Support-class character, meant to provide aid for her team. She is in a constant airborne state, able to move horizontally and vertically freely. To move forward faster, she can utilize her "Frenetic Flight" ability; while in use this depletes her fuel resource, which is recovered steadily during gameplay. Her main weapon, Biotic Pawjectiles, fires a spread of projectiles that will heal allies and damage enemies. Her other abilities include "Purr", which has a cooldown period after use and is unable to be used again during that duration. When activated, it heals allies around her for a period of time, while knocking back enemies.

Meanwhile, her "Lifeline" is an ability that can be toggled to switch her to transport mode. In this state, if another allied player accepts, she will tether them to her and be able to carry them around until they or the ally disengage the tether. This provides additional healing to the ally, while Jetpack Cat's movement speed is also increased. However, the fuel resource for Frenetic Flight if used in this state replenishes at a much slower rate. Lastly her Ultimate ability, "Catnapper", needs to be charged before use. The ability charges slowly during the course of gameplay, and can be charged faster through damage dealt to the enemy team or healing provided to allies. Once full, the ability can be activated to dive towards a targeted location, knocking down enemies in her path and tethering the closest one to her for a brief period of time. This allows her to isolate the tethered enemy to another location, or possibly use the game's environment such as a ledge to eliminate them.

Several of her abilities were based off actual cat behavior, or in the case of her Purr ability how real-life cat purrs are said to help regulate human heartbeats. The decision to make her constantly airborne was made to save work, as it meant not having to do a landing animation but also not having to create a secondary on-ground animation set. The Lifeline ability meanwhile took inspiration from the "two seater" design of the Warcraft character Cho'gall in Blizzard's Heroes of the Storm game, in which one player controlled the movement while the other attacked. An alternate idea for her Ultimate ability consisted of her being able to slow down incoming projectiles, a nod to a cat's reflexes. However this had the negative effect of slowing the whole game down if two Jetpack Cats used their Ultimate simultaneously.

Her Lifeline ability coupled with certain heroes was a point of concern during development, as the developers saw that the combination of her with a hero like Bastion, boosted by Mercy, would make for an "even scarier helicopter" according to game director Alec Dawson. Blizzard only tweaked the Lifeline ability shortly after launch, as the character was immediately popular in the Overwatch Championship Series, and Dawson said they wanted the Overwatch community to experience and have fun with the various combinations Jetpack Cat could make, helping to create experiences with the relaunch of Overwatch, before they refined her further. By October 2026, Blizzard did patch Jetpack Cat's Lifeline specifically to cause it to cancel if a carried Cassidy attempted to use his "High Noon" ultimate, as the combination made it difficult for enemies to hide from Cassidy's ultimate.

== Critical reception ==
Jetpack Cat was a long-awaited character by the player community, with Eurogamer writer Tom Phillips observing that after Wrecking Ball's introduction into the game, the question of whether the cat's concept was "too wacky" for the game became less plausible. PC Gamer writer Tyler Wilde felt unsurprised by the addition of a cat to Overwatch given that Winston and Wrecking Ball existed. He expressed concern about the idea of shooting at a cat that, unlike Winston and Wrecking Ball, was largely unprotected by armor, though noting that these characters still took serious damage. He felt that Jetpack Cat was the silliest character added to Overwatch in February, stating that the tether ability being annoying to other players made sense for a cat.

TheGamer writer Jade King stated that Jetpack Cat "walk[ed] a fine line between endlessly charming and frustratingly ridiculous", stating that it reminded her of Wrecking Ball, who made her quit playing Overwatch when he was added. She stated that, while Winston was easy to empathize with due to him speaking English and being the core reason the Overwatch organization was activated again, Wrecking Ball felt like a character added to be funny and cute, in contrast to Jetpack Cat. King felt that Jetpack Cat benefited in multiple ways Wrecking Ball did not, including being cute and being released alongside four other characters; if she had been added on her own, King felt that people would be less receptive towards Jetpack Cat.

Grace Black of Vice noticed that some were disappointed with Jetpack Cat's design, as they'd expected another cat shown belonging to Brigitte, Mitzi, being the more likely subject for inclusion. She pointed out that several media around the character showed her creating early versions of the jetpack for Mitzi so she could fight alongside her. While Black understood the disappointment, she pointed out that Mitzi was already included in several poses for Brigitte as a character in the game, and making her a separate character could cause confusion. Meanwhile, Fika presented a more clean option, and the in-game skin cosmetic items could allow her to take on the patterns and looks of other cats, including Mitzi.

From a gameplay perspective, Polygon writer Josh Broadwell stated that, at an event where Blizzard showed off the five new characters, Jetpack Cat proved to be a significant force. He observed that players would consistently break off from their teammates in order to deal with her, feeling that, while she is not a particular risk of doing damage herself, her maneuverability can be disruptive if she is left alone. Broadwell believed that, like Sombra, Jetpack Cat would wind up being the target of modifications and downgrades, though he hoped they would be minor changes due to appreciating how she changes how the game is played.
