= Overwatch (digital comic series) =

Digital comics series

- Overwatch No. 1 (April 2016); Cover art by Bengal

Publication information
- Publisher: Blizzard Entertainment
- Genre: Action/adventure
- Publication date: April 2016–April 2018
- No. of issues: 16
- Main character: Overwatch roster

Creative team
- Created by: James Waugh
- Written by: List: Robert Brooks (Note: Robert Brooks was credited as the writer for issues 1, 3, and 14.) Matt Burns (Note: Matt Burns was credited as the writer for issues 2, 9, 11, and 16; for issue 9, he is credited as the writer for story only. For issue 11, he is co-credited for its script.) Andrew Robinson (Note: Andrew Robinson was credited as the writer for issues 4–5, 7, and 15.) Micky Neilson (Note: Micky Neilson was credited as the writer for issue 6.) Michael Chu (Note: Michael Chu is credited as the writer for issues 8–10 and 12–13. For issue 9, he is credited as the writer for plot only. For issues 12 and 13, he is credited for the issue's script.) James Waugh (Note: Jame Waugh is credited as the writer for issue 11; specifically, he is co-credited for the issue's script.) Joelle Sellner (Note: Joelle Sellner is credited as the writer for issue 15; specifically, she is co-credited for the issue's script.)
- Artist: List: Bengal (Note: Bengal was credited as the artist for issues 1 and 7–8. Bengal was also credited as the colorist for issue 1.) Nesskain (Note: Nesskain was credited as the artist for issues 2 and 5. Nesskain was also credited as the colorist for both of these issues.) Gray Shuko (Note: Gray Shuko was credited as the artist for issues 3, 6, 9, 12, and 16. Shuko was also credited as the colorist for issues 3 and 6.) Jeffrey "Chamba" Cruz (Note: Jeffrey "Chamba" Cruz was credited as the artist for issue 4. Cruz was also credited as the colorist for issue 4.) Miki Montlló (Note: Miki Montlló was credited as the artist for issues 10 and 14.) Joe Ng (Note: Joe Ng was credited as the artist for issue 11.) Ryan Benjamin (Note: Ryan Benjamin was credited as the artist for issue 13.) John J. Hill (Note: John J. Hill was credited as the graphic designer for issue 13.) Kate Niemczyk (Note: Kate Niemczyk was credited as the artist for issue 15.)
- Colorist: List: Bengal Nesskain Gray Shuko Jeffrey "Chamba" Cruz Espen Grundetjern (Note: Espen Grundetjern was credited as the colorist for issue 11.)
- Editor: List: Robert Simpson and Cate Gary (Note: Robert Simpson and Cate Gary were jointly credited as the editors for issues 1–6. From issues 7 onwards, Simpson was solely credited as the lead editor, and Gary was solely credited as the senior editor.) Logan Lubera (art editor) (Note: Logan Lubera was credited as the art editor for issues 1–6.) Allison Monahan (Note: Allison Monahan was credited as the associate copy editor for issue 13.)

Overwatch is a digital comic series published online by Blizzard Entertainment and republished by Dark Horse Comics, featuring events surrounding the characters of the Overwatch universe. It was published between April 2016 and April 2018.

Blizzard uses the comic series, along with animated media, fictional news reports, and online character biographies, to develop the narrative of Overwatch, as the video game includes no traditional story or campaign mode.

== Development ==
Blizzard did not include a traditional campaign or story mode in the Overwatch video game. Instead, Blizzard opted to develop the story and lore of the Overwatch universe through a transmedia storytelling method, including animated shorts and comic titles.

On the approach to the storytelling, senior game designer Michael Chu, stated, "it was a solution that was born out of the kind of game we were making, because multiplayer shooter, obviously usually doesn't have a linear story. We had to think about other things, and we knew from day one that we wanted to make a significant Overwatch universe." Chu has also elaborated on how Blizzard decides which stories to tell through a comic format, stating, "every time we approach a story, very much like the skins, we have this backlog of story ideas, and hooks that we'd like to explore. We decide which ones we feel are the most exciting or make sense for the present. Like if we do a comic, comics are better for telling certain types of stories," adding, "we really decide what kind of story we want to tell, what's the story that we're going to tell, and then it's all about, lets figure out the best way to do this."

== Publication history ==
Blizzard announced they would release six digital comics prior to the game's May 24, 2016 release, in addition to a graphic novel titled Overwatch: First Strike, set for a release later in 2016. First Strike was later revealed to have a November 2016 digital release, in addition to an April 2017 hardcover release. On April 21, 2016, Train Hopper, headlining the cowboy character McCree, became the first Overwatch comic title released by Blizzard. This issue, as well as all subsequent issues of the comic title, were published for free.

The comic series is published in cooperation with Dark Horse Comics, who republish the series on their own digital comic service. Animated versions, or animatics, of the comic's issues are also produced and released by Madefire Studios, an interactive comics publishing platform, shortly after they are released on Blizzard's own service. Madefire's animated versions are viewable on Battle.net, as well.

Although Blizzard initially announced six comic issues to be released, they published Legacy, featuring Ana in July 2016. Ana was also the first character to be added into the game post-release. Later in the month, Blizzard and Dark Horse announced a deal that would have Dark Horse publish future comic works centered around the Overwatch universe, as well as the First Strike graphic novel and an art book. Blizzard later released holiday themed issues, Junkenstein and Reflections, in October and December 2016, respectively. In Reflections, the character Tracer is portrayed in a lesbian relationship, making her the first Overwatch character to be confirmed canonically LGBT. As a result, access to this issue was made unavailable in Russia, to avoid legal conflict with the country's gay propaganda law.

On November 18, 2016, Blizzard announced it had canceled the release of the First Strike graphic novel. In the cancellation announcement, Michael Chu detailed that "the original idea for the graphic novel dates back to the early days of the game's development and came from our desire to tell the story of the founding of Overwatch during the Omnic Crisis." Chu added that "in the years since First Strike's conception, we have done a lot of development on the universe and its stories. While the core of this story remains, we have changed and expanded upon how we see the events that took place during the first days of Overwatch." Micky Neilson and Ludo Lullabi were slated to be the writer and artist for the graphic novel, respectively.

A hardcover collection of the first twelve issues of the Overwatch digital comics titled Overwatch: Anthology, Volume 1 was released on October 10, 2017. Dark Horse published an expanded edition of the anthology in November 2021, with a hardcover version released on December 1. The Russian edition of Anthology, Volume 1 originally did not include the Reflections issue to meet the original game's 12+ age restriction, although the issue was included in the 18+ rated 2021 re-issue of the anthology.

In April 2018, Blizzard released Retribution, the 16th issue of the comic series to tie-in with the game's Archive: Retribution event. No further issues of the series were released after this, though Blizzard later released further comic titles featuring Overwatch characters beginning with Tracer—London Calling, a five-issue mini-series.

== Issues ==
#	Title	Main character(s)	Publication Date (Note: The publication date information is provided for the original digital publication date on PlayOverwatch.com.)	ASIN	Ref.
Volume 1
1	Train Hopper	Cassidy (Note: The character of Cassidy was named McCree at the time of this issue's release.)	April 21, 2016	B01EXUFAKW	
2	Dragon Slayer	Reinhardt and Brigitte	April 28, 2016	B01EZ2S0PU	
3	Going Legit	Junkrat and Roadhog	May 5, 2016	B01GGOEM6G	
4	A Better World	Symmetra	May 13, 2016	B01GGOEMM0	
5	Mission Statement	Pharah	May 20, 2016	B01GGOEN3I	
6	Destroyer	Torbjörn	May 24, 2016 (Note: Although the official blog post announcing Destroyer was released on May 26, 2016, Blizzard published the comic on May 24.)	B01GGOENQU	
7	Legacy	Ana and Widowmaker	July 14, 2016	B01IO5REE2	
8	Old Soldiers	Ana, Soldier: 76 and Reaper	July 21, 2016	B01IUBQM0C	
9	Junkenstein	Junkrat, Reinhardt, Torbjörn, Ana, Reaper, Soldier: 76, Cassidy and Mercy	October 11, 2016	B01M622PNA	
10	Reflections	Tracer and Winston	December 20, 2016	B01NBWIP0B	
11	Binary	Bastion and Torbjörn	March 8, 2017	B076JPL1VJ	
12	Uprising	Tracer, Reinhardt, Torbjörn, Ana, Reaper, Soldier: 76, Cassidy, Winston and Mercy	April 5, 2017	B072MLWN4Q	
Volume 2
13	Masquerade	Doomfist, Reaper, Sombra and Widowmaker	July 19, 2017	B076JFN1JR	
14	Wasted Land	Junkrat and Roadhog	September 6, 2017	B076JKQKP9	
15	Searching	Zarya and Sombra	September 27, 2017	B076JFPH7C	
16	Retribution	Reaper, Soldier: 76, Cassidy, Genji and Moira	April 4, 2018	B07C49HY4W	
