= Tracer (Overwatch) =

Fictional character in 2016 video game Overwatch

- Overwatch character
- Tracer in Overwatch 2
- First game: Heroes of the Storm (2016)
- First major game: Overwatch (2016)
- Designed by: Geoff Goodman
- Voiced by: Cara Theobold

In-universe information
- Class: Damage
- Nationality: British

Tracer is the call sign of Lena Oxton, a character who appears in Blizzard Entertainment's Overwatch franchise. The 2014 Overwatch Cinematic Trailer short was her first appearance overall. An April 2016 update for the crossover multiplayer online battle arena game Heroes of the Storm added her to its playable roster, marking her first inclusion in a video game. Shortly thereafter, she appeared in the first Overwatch game, a first-person hero shooter. She again appeared in its 2023 sequel, Overwatch 2.

In the Overwatch narrative, she is a peppy and energetic pilot of British origin. A damage-class hero in-game, Tracer has low health, but is highly mobile, being able to both teleport and time travel. Those abilities were caused by an accident that left her unable to maintain a physical form in the present until her friend and fellow Overwatch agent, Winston, invented the "chronal accelerator", a device that allows her to control her own time frame.

Prominently featured in the franchise's official media and serving as the first game's cover girl, Tracer is one of the most recognizable Overwatch characters and one of the more commonly featured in its fan art. Tracer has attracted media coverage related to online controversies surrounding one of her in-game victory poses, as well as her prominence in fan-produced pornography, which Blizzard has tried to remove. The character has appeared in Overwatch animated media and a digital comic series based on the game. In her comic debut, she is revealed to be a lesbian, a depiction that was positively received by media outlets and players.

== Development and design ==
=== Gameplay and art ===
Tracer was one of the first twelve Overwatch characters introduced at BlizzCon in 2014. Her in-game character model notably features tight orange pants, goggles and Crocs-like shoes. Her design is based upon an element from Blizzard's canceled project, Titan. Overwatch's game director Jeff Kaplan said Titan included a class of character called "Jumper", which developed into Tracer because Overwatch focuses on creating individual characters instead of generic classes. The Jumper class was depicted as male in most of the concept artwork and its player version. Like Tracer in Overwatch, the Jumper was equipped with the Blink and Recall abilities, as well as a Pulse bomb and dual-wielding machine pistols. The design of Tracer's pistols were influenced by the G18 pistols featured in Call of Duty: Modern Warfare 2.

Tracer's design was influenced by Geoff Goodman, the lead hero designer for Overwatch. Tracer was the first hero designed for the game and was used to test the basic gameplay. Kaplan recounted the first Overwatch playtest, stating, "The entire level was gray and blocky and the only hero was Tracer. We had no visual effects or attachment points on her guns so she just shot laser beams out of her eyes." Overwatch's assistant game director Aaron Keller has said Temple of Anubis was the first map developed for the game, and that the map and Tracer were worked on concurrently. Keller said, "One day we got both of them in, and just with Tracer running around an unfinished map it was fun". Keller said that, unlike other characters, Tracer's three abilities were maintained throughout the game's development, noting, "from the beginning, she originated as a 'whole' hero". However, her health pool was nerfed during the game's late closed beta stages. Concerning Tracer's gameplay style, Kotaku's Kirk Hamilton said "she's quick and squishy, designed more to harry the opposing team from behind than to survive a frontal assault".

Lead artist Arnold Tsang said the character's body size and running pose were considered during character design to make each hero easily identifiable. Tracer has a wild running animation and a unique trail of blue light extending behind her. Nathan Grayson of Kotaku said her jump animation appears "hyper-exaggerated and kinda goofy looking", a result of the smear frame and squash and stretch animation techniques used in Overwatch. Blizzard senior animator David Gibson pointed out frames from her jump animation: "We're trying to just push it a little further than normal. Something as simple as stretching the torso out, having her hang [in the air] just a little bit longer than normal. Really squashing her when she lands."

Comparison between Tracer's original pose (left) and altered replacement (right)

On the return of Overwatch's closed beta in February 2016, victory poses and other cosmetic changes were added to the characters. In March 2016, a controversy arose about Tracer's "Over the Shoulder" victory pose after a user on the game's forums said it was out of character and "reduces Tracer to just another bland female sex symbol". The post generated a discussion on the forums, which gaming outlets noted for its civility; several users added their own critical opinions of the pose while others disagreed with the original poster. Kaplan posted an apologetic response in which he announced Blizzard's plans to replace the pose because they did not want to "make someone feel uncomfortable, under-appreciated or misrepresented".

The decision was met with mixed reactions from the gaming community. Some argued that Blizzard had surrendered its creative control over the game, censoring content to appease an offended user, while others praised Blizzard's willingness to listen to the community and adhere to standards for portraying characters according to their personalities. Kaplan later said the game's development team was not "entirely happy with the original pose" and that internal creative struggles over its inclusion had occurred. The following week, a replacement pose was released; one commentator said this was "different, butt [sic] not by much", referring to the prominent buttocks of the original pose. According to Jessica Lachenal of The Mary Sue website, the replacement pose was inspired by a cheesecake pin-up illustration by Billy De Vorss. Kaplan called the replacement pose cool, cute, and playful, and said he wished the team had chosen it originally.

The developers of Overwatch later introduced seasonal events, including themed cosmetics such as skins and sprays for players to equip the character with. Tracer received two skins during the game's first seasonal event, "Summer Games 2016", which was themed after the 2016 Summer Olympics. In the game's first year of release, she received themed skins during the game's subsequent "Winter Wonderland", "Year of the Rooster 2017", "Uprising", and "Anniversary" events.

Like the other Overwatch characters, Tracer underwent a character redesign during the development of Overwatch 2; the redesign retained her trademark orange pants and goggles, albeit visually tweaked.

=== Story and character ===
Outside the game, Blizzard's fictional biography for Tracer lists her real name as Lena Oxton, her age as 26, and her base of operations as London, England.

Tracer is an adventurer and former agent of the international task force, Overwatch. In Overwatch lore, Tracer is known for her piloting skills; after being a member of the British Royal Air Force, she became the youngest person ever inducted into Overwatch's experimental flight program. She was chosen to test the Slipstream, a prototype of a teleporting fighter; during the test flight, the Slipstream's teleportation matrix malfunctioned and Tracer was pronounced dead. She later reappeared, having been desynchronized from the flow of time, preventing her from keeping a physical form in the present until a scientist named Winston created the chronal accelerator, which gives Tracer control over her own time. These events occur during a period in which the Overwatch organization was increasingly protested and criticized by the public. In an April 2017 patch, the game's "Hero Gallery" was updated to include short biographies for the characters and background information on the skins that the player can equip onto characters. Though in the franchise's narrative Overwatch was forcibly dissolved, Tracer's biography notes that she continues "to right wrongs and fight the good fight wherever the opportunity presents itself".

Tracer was one of the first characters to have her backstory fleshed out. In an interview with PC Gamer, the game's creative director, Chris Metzen likened her to a Spider-Man–type character and stated, "Tracer [was] one of the first characters we really got to know. And while she wasn't particularly created to be a starring role, if you will, [...] it feels good to leverage her in the front of story ideas." Tracer has been called a peppy character; Hardcore Gamer's Kevin Dunsmore described her as a "spunky Brit [who is] [...] full of little quips as she zips around the battlefield". Kaplan described Tracer as cute and playful, noting that she does everything with a wink and a smile. In an interview with PCGamesN, game designer Michael Chu said he feels Tracer embodies the game's theme of heroism, adding, "she has a personality which is out of the norm for most people. She is incredibly optimistic, she is incredibly bubbly—it's part of her hero persona." Matching her English origin, Tracer is voiced by English actress Cara Theobold.

At BlizzCon 2015, Metzen was asked about the presence of gay heroes in the Overwatch universe; he confirmed there were such characters but elaborated, "we want it to play out organically, we don't want it to be a data point or feel contrived in any way." A lesbian, Tracer became the first Overwatch hero to be canonically revealed as LGBTQ in Reflections, a December 2016 issue of the Overwatch digital comic. She is depicted in the comic as a partner in a romantic relationship with a woman named Emily, who is not part of the Overwatch team. Blizzard noted the importance of variety in character background, which helps deepen and enrich the game's broader fictional universe. Blizzard stated about Tracer's development, "As with any aspect of our characters' backgrounds, their sexuality is just one part of what makes our heroes who they are. From the very beginning of our work on Tracer's story, it just felt right to make this an aspect of her character."

== Gameplay ==
=== Overwatch and Overwatch 2 ===
At the original game's launch, Tracer was classified as an offense character. In a June 2018 patch for the game, Blizzard merged the offense and defense classes into a single one known as "Damage" or "damage per second" (DPS). One of the more versatile DPS characters, Tracer is listed as a two-star (medium) difficulty character for players. She is equipped with dual pulse pistols that reload quickly and deal damage rapidly at a short range. She is commonly cited by video game media as one of the fastest characters for both the original game's and sequel's rosters. Highly mobile and an effective flanker, she is considered an annoyance to the opposing team. Although Tracer has a speed advantage, she has the lowest health pool in the game. Her Blink ability, which comes with three charges, allows her to teleport a short distance in the direction she is traveling. Using this ability she can "zip behind an enemy in an instant for surprise attacks, or dodge completely out of the line of fire". Her Recall ability allows Tracer to return to her position three seconds prior, resetting her health and reloading her gun. Both abilities have a cooldown period. Tracer's ultimate ability is Pulse Bomb, a sticky bomb that clings to the first surface or hero it touches before detonating with area of effect damage.

Jeff Kaplan has commented on her harassing gameplay style, noting that:

[The game has] characters like Tracer and Genji ... who are really unique in how Overwatch is played, and sometimes the absolute right thing for Tracer to be doing is to be off on her own, completely away from the objective or completely away from the team, harassing other players who are running back from the spawn. And she might not even be killing those players ... She's a distracting, ambushing skirmisher. And that doesn't really fit in necessarily with objective time. ... You can be the absolute MVP of the match when you're doing some of those things, and there's no way to really score it accurately.

Upon the release of Overwatch 2, Den of Geek noted Tracer as "an obvious star of the speedy Overwatch 2 meta," but added that "the fact she spends less time frustrating slow tanks than she used to means that Tracer players will have to pick on DPS characters a bit more than they used to."

=== Heroes of the Storm ===
Destructoid noted that her unconventional design in Heroes of the Storm is similar to her Overwatch design, writing that "she has the same basic abilities, and even powers up her Heroic [ability] just like an ultimate—by dealing damage". A Heroic ability in Heroes of the Storm is player-chosen and is unlocked once the hero reaches level 10. In Heroes of the Storm, players have no control over Tracer's Heroic ability, which is unlocked immediately. Her core skill-set is teleportation, which includes a quick blink strike and a Recall ability that functions similarly to the one in Overwatch. Chris Thursten of PC Gamer wrote that he was impressed by her Heroes of the Storm design, which defies the normal rules of the game and allows her to "literally [run] circles around certain heroes". Acknowledging that she can be an "absolute terror to the enemy team", Blizzard rolled out a nerfed version of the character on May 4, 2016, less than a month after her introduction.

== Appearances ==
=== Video games ===
Tracer debuted as a playable character in the video game Heroes of the Storm in its April 2016 update, nearly a month prior to the release of Overwatch. PC Gamer's Chris Thursten called her inclusion in the game a marketing move but noted that Tracer felt different than other MOBA characters as a result of her origin in a first-person shooter. He praised her inclusion as a legitimate addition to the roster, writing that she "introduces a bunch of new ideas to Heroes of the Storm that elevate her above traditional preorder bonus fluff".

The video game Overwatch lacks a traditional campaign or story mode; its lore and character backgrounds, including Tracer's, are instead shown through its map design and character voice lines.

In April 2017, Blizzard launched Uprising, a seasonal event that included an eponymous player versus environment co-op game mode. The default version of the mode limits players to four characters; Tracer, Torbjörn, Reinhardt, and Mercy. The limitation to these characters was due to the mode being a portrayal of the King's Row Uprising event from Overwatch's past. In this story element set seven years before the events in the main game, Tracer—then known as Cadet Oxton—works alongside the other three characters in her first mission as a member of Overwatch. The strike team is tasked with thwarting an attack on London perpetrated by an extremist group.

Tracer again appeared in the Overwatch 2, which is set to expand the Overwatch narrative with a player versus environment (PvE) mode. In 2026, Tracer was one of several characters included in Overwatch Rush, a mobile game developed by Blizzard.

=== Animations and films ===
In November 2014, Tracer appeared alongside Winston in a cinematic trailer for Overwatch. The two characters fought against Widowmaker and Reaper, agents of a terrorist group called Talon. The trailer, which officially announced Overwatch, debuted at BlizzCon 2014. Widowmaker and Reaper invade a museum and try to steal Doomfist's gauntlet; Tracer and Winston thwart the heist.

In March 2016, Tracer had a voice-only appearance in Recall, the first in a series of animated Overwatch shorts. Tracer responds to Winston's recall of Overwatch agents, allowing her voice to be heard. The events of Recall occur prior to those of the 2014 cinematic trailer. In April, Tracer made a physical appearance in Alive, the second in the series of animated Overwatch shorts. The short is set in London's King's Row, which is the setting one of the game's maps. In the short, Tracer attempts to stop Widowmaker from assassinating Tekhartha Mondatta. Tracer fails to protect Mondatta and is incapacitated by Widowmaker, who damages her chronal accelerator.

In April 2017, Tracer appeared in a video showing the events of the King's Row Uprising event, which Blizzard described as "a pivotal moment in history from before the fall of Overwatch". Tracer narrates the video as Cadet Oxton. In July, Blizzard released another animated origin story focusing on the character Doomfist; in the video, Tracer, Genji and Winston battle Doomfist.

Tracer appears as a background character and avatar in Steven Spielberg's 2018 film Ready Player One, based on the novel of the same name by Ernest Cline.

In November 2019, Tracer appeared in the Zero Hour animated cinematic, which functioned as an announcement for Overwatch 2.

=== Comics ===
Overwatch's tie-in digital comic series featured Tracer in its December 2016 issue, Reflections. Reflections is a holiday-themed issue written by Michael Chu and featuring art by Miki Montlló. Tracer is depicted in a romantic relationship with a woman named Emily, who is not on the Overwatch team. This confirmed Tracer as the first of several characters that Blizzard noted have diverse sexuality. To avoid legal conflict with Russia's ban against gay propaganda, Blizzard blocked access to this comic from the Russian Federation. Tracer is depicted with her chronal accelerator removed; the game's Twitter account confirmed the accelerator still works if removed as long as it is charging nearby.

Tracer appears in the April 2017 issue, Uprising. The issue, set seven years before the game, is about a terrorist attack by an extremist group on King's Row in London. In the comic, Overwatch is forbidden from operating in England but Strike Commander Jack Morrison, also known as Soldier: 76, sends Tracer—then new to the Overwatch team—along with Reinhardt, Torbjörn, and Mercy to assist with the situation in London. Tracer's catchphrase, "Cheers love, the cavalry's here!" is derived from a comment made by Torbjörn when they first meet.

In September 2020, Blizzard began publishing Tracer—London Calling, a five-issue comic series. The comic served as a tie-in for an in-game seasonal event. The comic series delves into Tracer's interactions with the omnics of the London Underground, as well as human–omnic relations.

== Promotion and reception ==
Tracer has appeared in Overwatch merchandising. In 2017, Japanese manufacturer Good Smile Company partnered with Blizzard to release Overwatch action figures in their Nendoroid and Figma lines, which included figures of Tracer. In 2018, Lego announced an Overwatch set featuring Tracer. In October 2022, Blizzard and McDonald's entered a promotional partnership, which packaged Tracer's "Lightning" skin for a limited-time with certain combo meal orders. Customers were granted the skin for use in Overwatch 2.

Tracer is often cited as the "poster girl" for the Overwatch franchise, with many publications referring to her as the original game's mascot or noting that she essentially fills that role. (Note: Sources that cite Tracer as such, or share similar sentiments like calling her the game's "cover girl" or "cover woman" include:) Similarly, video game media writers have described her as one of, if not the most "iconic" character in the franchise, with some including her among the best or most iconic video game characters in general. (Note: Sources that share such an opinion about Tracer include: Glixel's "50 Most Iconic Video Game Characters of the 21s Century" list (2016): PC Gamer's "50 most iconic characters in PC gaming" list (2021): Polygon's "70 best video game characters of the 2010s" list (2019):) The Daily Dot's Joseph Knoop ranked her as the second-best Overwatch character, writing "Tracer is at many times the heart and soul of Overwatch's unerring optimism" and calling her the "indisputable face" of the franchise. Writing for Polygon in 2019, Nicole Carpenter called Tracer one of the best video game characters of the decade, stating, "not only is she the cover woman of a competitive shooter, but she's a gay woman — and that's been important for a lot of fans who may not have otherwise seen queer characters in blockbuster video games."

Jeff Grubb of VentureBeat noted that Tracer seemed "especially popular" within the game's early fan culture. Having gained a following among players even prior to Overwatch's official release, Tracer has appeared in much fan art and cosplay. Kotaku's Nathan Grayson described her as "peppy and fun, but also courageous and badass", adding that, "In creating their own works involving Tracer, fans have turned those characteristics up to 11. Some depict her as childlike, naive and carefree. She can even be kind of a doof, a punchline." Kotaku noted that Japanese gamers received Overwatch positively, finding the characters of Tracer and Mei especially cute. In 2021, PC Gamer noted that Tracer's popularity amongst fans hadn't "waned in the slightest" through the expansion of the game's character roster. Tracer's popularity had unintended consequences; Overwatch-related searches increased by 817% on Pornhub after the game's open beta went live, making "Overwatch Tracer" the top search term related to the game. Discontent with this fan-generated porn, Blizzard made efforts to have it removed. Nonetheless, Tracer porn remained popular after the game's release, as she was the third-most-searched video game character on Pornhub in 2017, after fellow Overwatch characters D.Va and Mercy.

Panel of the Reflections issue, in which Tracer is seen kissing her girlfriend, Emily (art by Miki Montlló). Tracer's depiction as a lesbian in the comic was generally well received by media outlets.

Tracer's canonical depiction as a lesbian was generally well received by media outlets and players alike. USgamer called it "an impressive move for Blizzard, given that Tracer is their flagship character". Polygon's Allegra Frank described the revelation as one "that fans have waited a long, long time for". Peter Amato of Paste commented that, with the exception of a vocal minority, most fan reactions "ranged from indifferent to cheering". Several Kotaku writers discussed the revelation, leading to a positive consensus. Kotaku's Cecilia D'Anastasio pointed to a previous statement from Blizzard that clarified the developers' intention to have an LGBT character revelation play out organically, commenting: "I feel that the comic did that. Tracer buys her partner a scarf. Her partner likes it. They kiss. The comic moves on. I think it was handled quite well, although the idea of Blizzard announcing a queer character feels sort of ... gimmicky." Gita Jackson concurred with D'Anastasio, noting she "was definitely concerned that revealing a queer character would come off as a gimmick, and [was] very pleased at how they pulled this off. This doesn't feel tokenized." Fellow Kotaku writer Heather Alexandra commented, "I think having something explicit was necessary ... Having something definite gives queer players a proper point of contact". Andy Chalk of PC Gamer wrote:

...the comic itself is a fairly straightforward heartwarming tale of what really matters during the most hectic season of all. But the reaction to Tracer's identity has been anything but. Messages decrying Blizzard's "mistake" have cropped up all over the Overwatch forums and other social media, countered by others praising the studio for explicitly stating—in a low-key fashion—that the face of one of the biggest games of the year is gay.

On her gameplay mechanics, ESPN described her as "the classic in-and-out harasser", referring to her speed and ability to blink around the map. Mike Minotti of VentureBeat said; "Tracer [is] a lot of fun to play. Her whole teleporting/rewinding mechanics [are] so unique and fast-paced. I feel like [Blizzard's] done a great job making a varied, relatively balanced cast." Shortly before the game's five-year release anniversary, The Washington Post wrote that despite her Pulse Bomb not carrying "the same 'boom' it did in the old days," players still consistently picked Tracer for competitive matches. The publication cited Yaki, a professional Overwatch League player who attributed Tracer's in-game appeal to her consistency, as she has the ability to perform well on any map.

== See also ==
- List of video games with LGBT characters: 2010s
