= Payload (disambiguation) =

Payload is the carrying capacity of a vehicle, often an aircraft or spacecraft.

Payload may also refer to:

- Payload (computing), several analogous usages
- Payload (gaming), a game mode in hero shooter video games
- Payload (EP), an EP by Hunters & Collectors
- Payload (G.I. Joe), several versions of a character or its toy from the G.I. Joe franchise
