= Orisa (Overwatch) =

Fictional character in the Overwatch franchise

- Overwatch character
- Orisa's appearance in Overwatch
- First appearance: Overwatch (2017)
- Created by: Michael Chu and Arnold Tsang
- Designed by: Ben Zhang (Orisa); Arnold Tsang (Efi); Daryl Tan (Overwatch 2)
- Voiced by: Cherrelle Skeete

In-universe information
- Race: Omnic
- Class: Tank
- Nationality: Nigerian

Orisa (/oʊriːsɑː/) is a character who first appeared in the 2016 video game Overwatch, a Blizzard Entertainment-developed first-person hero shooter, and the resulting franchise.

== Conception and development ==
Orisa's head went through multiple designs to try and maintain the African theme for her character.

Orisa was conceived due to the development team's desire to add an "anchor tank" type of character for players to want to keep close to during the course of gameplay, similar to what they'd achieved with fellow character Reinhardt. To this end a multitude of designs were considered, including several bi-pedal mech suits, and early on the developers wanted to keep her design similar to that of fellow character Bastion. Meanwhile, lead art director Arnold Tsang meanwhile wanted to try a quadrupedal design to push the concept of what a "hero" in the setting's context could visually look like, in part to explore the wider ecology of omnics, a type of robot within the Overwatch setting. Further inspiration was taken from the original unused design for Reinhardt during the game's pitch, in which he wore an African-inspired mech suit modeled after a wildebeest.

Lead writer Michael Chu conceived her as a robot guardian for their "Numbani" setting, an African city within the Overwatch universe. They developed her personality to be somewhat between that of RoboCop and GLaDOS, with an emphasis on advanced artificial intelligence and learning through action, to help separate her from the other robot playable characters and be "a little more low tech". As the city was intended to be futuristic, concept artist Ben Zhang worked these design elements into Orisa. While early designs utilized blocky shapes and sharp angles, her later designs became more elegant and streamlined to illustrate the character as a newer model of robot within the universe. Though the earlier designs were modeled after a beetle, this didn't fit the image of a "mighty protector" the team wanted to convey, so as a result her torso was straightened and adjusted her legs to more resemble a centaur. She was given a color scheme of green, yellow and earth tones to help fit the African theme as well as visual synergy with Numbani.

The unconventional nature and design of the character made it difficult for her personality to encapsulate the character in Chu's eyes, so he created Efi, a child genius resident of the city that in the game's lore builds Orisa. Designed by Tsang, Efi is a non-playable character intended to help portray Orisa and the world around them through the eyes of an imaginative child, and ground Orsia's character in a perspective they felt players could relate to. When developing the game's sequel, Overwatch 2, they considered removing her centaur aspect entirely and changing her whole model to be more a "tribal" bipedal robot carrying a shield. However, production costs prohibited this change.

=== Design ===
Standing 7 feet 4 inches tall, Orisa appears as a large brown and black robot with green and gold highlights. She has four legs, with her torso positioned towards the front of her body with two arms, her right ending in a large cannon while her left has a hand with three fingers a thumb. Her head is oval shaped and gold in the shape of a tribal mask, with a large horn on each side that face downward with the tips pointed up. Her eyes feature four sets of eyelids that close in pairs. Meanwhile, a large reactor resets on her back, with two circular green vents protruding from either side, while a long green loincloth dangles between her front legs.

Like other Overwatch characters, Orisa received skins, unlockable cosmetic items to change her in-game appearance. In particular, the "Dynastinae" skin references the earlier beetle concept, giving her large dark blue places of carapace as well as spikes and a horn meant to resemble those of a rhinoceros beetle. For Overwatch 2, her design was changed significantly, with darker browns and tans added to her color scheme while adding more silver and green to her torso, reshaping it entirely. Her horns meanwhile were significantly reduced in size, while large cables now protrude from the back of her head.

== Appearances ==
Rebuilt from the wreckage of an OR15 defense robot after an attack by Doomfist in her home city of Numbani, Efi upgraded the hardware and software on the Omnic, emphasizing public safety as its primary objective. Efi's upgrades on the robot also created a sentient identity, in which Efi dubbed the robot Orisa from its designation number. Despite still being young, Efi continues to guide Orisa in the path of protecting the innocent. With the help of Lúcio, the duo successfully drove Doomfist out of Numbani after reappearing with multiple attacks on the city. Her name derives from "orisha", spirits in the Yoruba religion of West Africa.

=== Gameplay ===
Within her Overwatch skill kit, her primary weapon was the Fusion Driver, a long-range projectile-based machine gun; its alternate fire mode, Halt!, released a slow-moving projectile that the player could detonate to draw in nearby enemies towards the point of detonation, similar to Zarya's Graviton Surge. She could launch a deployable Protective Barrier similar to Reinhardt's shield which could be used for strategic defenses, and could Fortify herself to temporarily prevent all forms of crowd control against her, such as Lúcio's sonic blasts or Reinhardt's Earthshatter abilities. Her ultimate ability was Supercharger, a deployable device which gave Orisa and her teammates, provided they were in line-of-sight, an attack boost similar to that of Mercy, though the Supercharger itself could be destroyed by enemy fire and deactivated after a few seconds.

Orisa's skill-set was rebuilt significantly for Overwatch 2, meant to speed up play and reduce dependence on shields. Her Barrier, Halt, and Supercharger abilities have been removed, and instead she gained an Energy Javelin that can be used to launch enemies away, potentially damaging them if they hit walls. Orisa can also use her Javelin Spin to surge forward, directly attacking enemies and destroying projectiles. Her ultimate ability is Terra Surge that draws enemies towards her while making her immune to stun and crowd control effects. Additionally, her Fusion Driver fires large projectiles that shrink down as they travel.

== Promotion and reception ==
Orisa was revealed on March 2, 2017. Unlike the previously introduced hero, Sombra, who was the subject of a protracted alternate reality game that was met with some criticism, Blizzard opted to tease Orisa over a much shorter period via social media, introducing the character of Efi and new events in the Overwatch narrative happening on Numbani a few weeks before Orisa's reveal. In a collaboration with Disc City Entertainment Co., select cafes in Japan served drinks inspired by the character and others in the Overwatch cast.

While Orisa was cited as an example of one of the "badass, stereotype-defying ladies" in Overwatch by sources such as Kotaku's Cecilia D'Anastasio, other outlets voiced issues with the character, leading to mixed reception. Colin Campbell of Polygon noted that while she was happy to see Efi representing Sub-Saharan African cultures in gaming, she was disappointed the character wasn't the primary hero, only her creation was. Austen Goslin in an article for the same website instead criticized the lack of buildup for the character, noting that coupled with the lack of connection to the main storyline Efi and Orisa felt "inconsequential and trivial when faced with the legendary heroes of Overwatch, or the mythical characters like Doomfist." Other criticism was focused on the context of the then-lack of a playable black female character in the roster, with several outlets stating Orisa herself "didn't count" due to being a robot. The magazine PC Powerplay, on the other hand, criticized how her gameplay differed between Overwatch and Overwatch 2, which in their eyes changed her from a protector and "nucleus of a team" to an aggressor, making her more stereotypical of how black characters are portrayed in gaming.

Chris Kindred of Paste on the other hand was far more receptive of the character, calling her an "Afrofuturist icon" alongside Efi. He further praised that the character's story and characterization allowed both of them to make mistakes and grow, something that he felt black characters were seldom able to experience in video games, and enjoyed the social imagery of Efi creating her own answer to surrounding violence scratch as providing "affirmation of the work black girls and women do for social progress." Kindred also addressed the notion of whether Orisa counted as a black female character or not, citing the cultural influences in her design on both a visual and story level but Efi's involvement in her creation, and whether "blackness extends to robots built by black hands in a black culture." Outside of these factors, he additionally praised her role as a tank, noting that it helped establish her as a protector and the "backbone" of team compositions in Overwatch. Paste echoed Kindred's statements again later that year as they named Orisa one of the best video game characters introduced in 2017.

Brandon Howard of TheGamer praised Orisa and Efi's portrayal in the standalone The Hero of Numbani novel, noting that it helped fleshed out the characters in a narrative sense beyond what the games were possible, while also providing more characterization to Efi herself. He additionally praised the emphasis on African culture in Orisa's design, something he felt media seldom properly touched upon, and how Orisa's voice was established as a combination of voices from "a variety of powerful, compassionate women in Efi's life [...] It's something special."
