= Overwatch (2023 video game) =

2023 video game

- Cover art featuring three of the playable characters (left to right): Ana, Tracer and Brigitte
- Developer: Blizzard Entertainment
- Publisher: Blizzard Entertainment
- Director: Aaron Keller
- Designers: Michael Heiberg; Trey Spisak
- Composer: Adam Burgess
- Series: Overwatch
- Platforms: Nintendo Switch; Nintendo Switch 2; PlayStation 4; PlayStation 5; Windows; Xbox One; Xbox Series X/S
- Release: August 11, 2023; Nintendo Switch 2 April 14, 2026
- Genres: First-person shooter; Hero shooter
- Mode: Multiplayer

Overwatch (initially released as Overwatch 2) is a 2023 first-person hero shooter video game by Blizzard Entertainment. As a sequel and replacement to the original 2016 Overwatch, the game includes new game modes and a reduction in team size from six to five. The game is free-to-play on Nintendo Switch, Nintendo Switch 2, PlayStation 4, PlayStation 5, Windows, Xbox One, and Xbox Series X/S and features full cross-platform play.

Overwatch 2 was announced in 2019; it released in early access in October 2022 before officially releasing in August 2023. The game was planned to feature more story-based cooperative modes, but these were scrapped in 2023 to focus on its player versus player (PvP) elements. The game was rebranded as simply Overwatch in February 2026 with a renewed focus on narrative elements tied to new heroes and seasonal content. The game received generally favorable reviews from critics.

== Gameplay ==
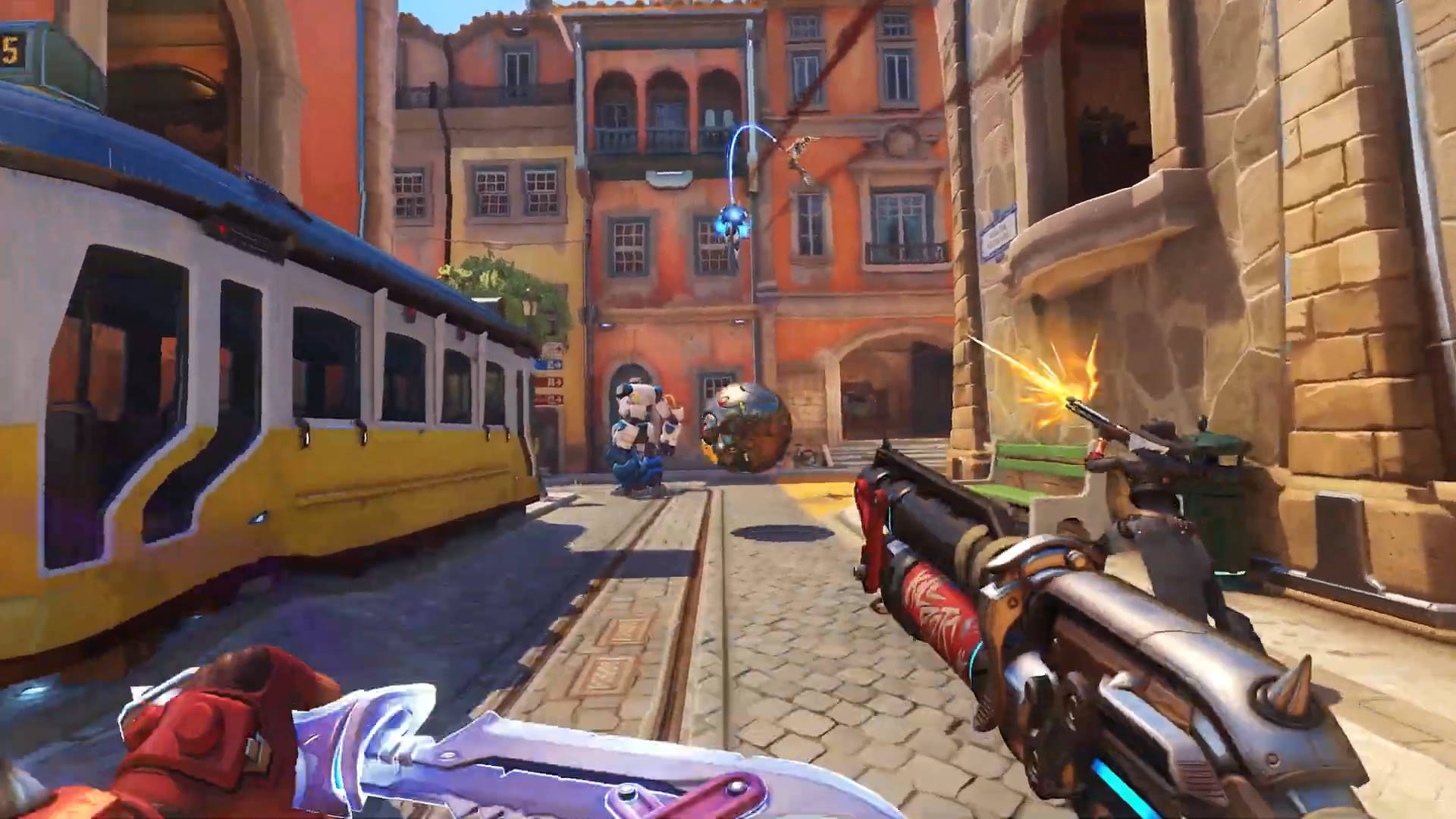
Gameplay as Junker Queen

Overwatch 2 is a hero shooter, where players are split into two teams of five characters known as "heroes" from a roster of over 40. Heroes are organized into a "damage" role, responsible for offensive efforts; a "support" role, responsible for healing and utility; and a "tank" role, responsible for creating space for their team. Each character has a unique skill kit, made up of active, passive, and ultimate abilities. Overwatch 2, like its predecessor, primarily centers on player versus player (PvP) combat across a variety of different modes and maps, and includes both casual and ranked competitive matches, as well as non-matchmade arcade modes.

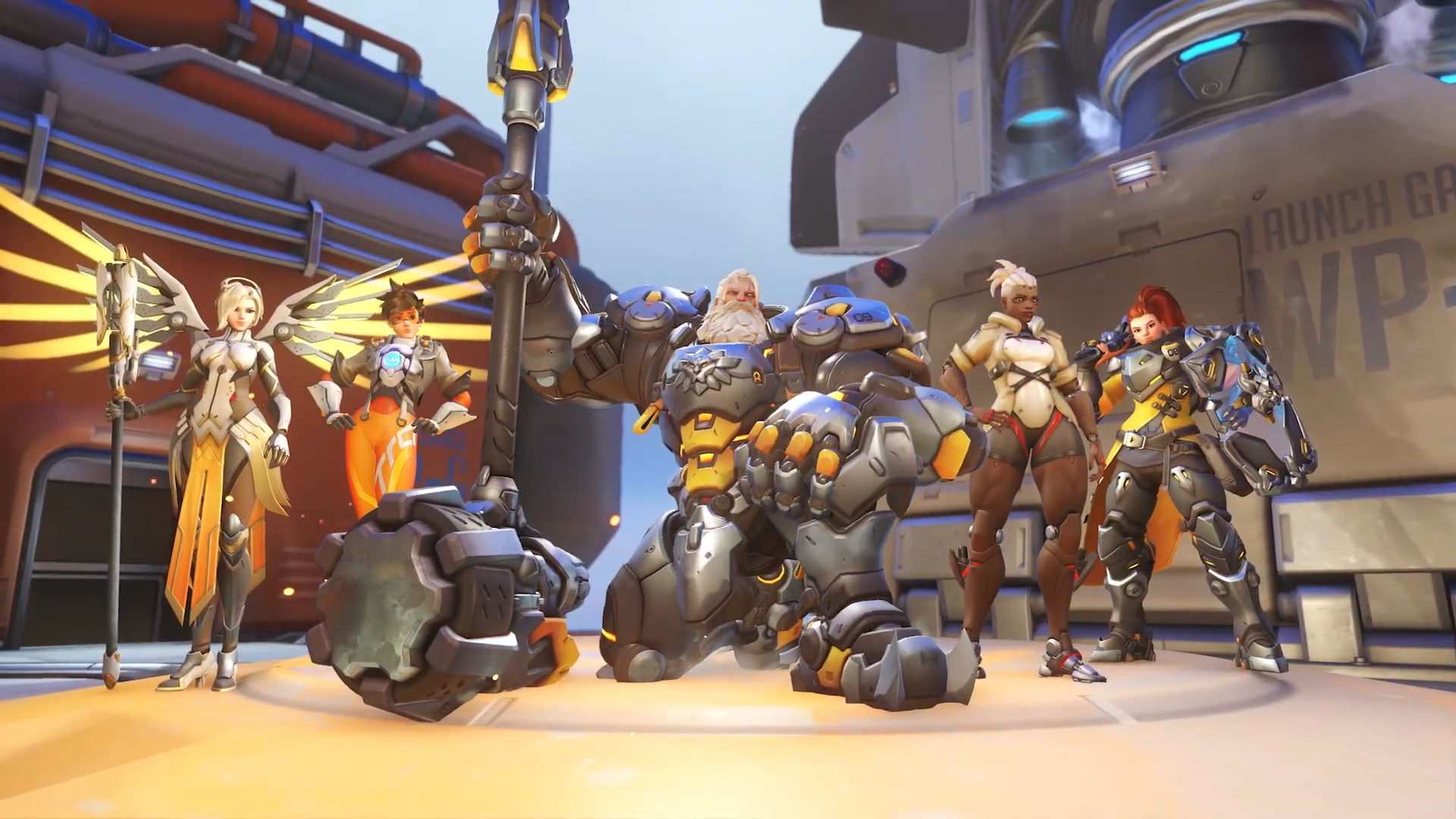
A typical 5v5 team composition. Characters (left-right): Mercy, Tracer, Reinhardt, Sojourn, Brigitte

All heroes available in Overwatch remained available in Overwatch 2 along with new heroes introduced for the sequel. The original Overwatch was designed for six-on-six team combat, with two of each role on a team. In Overwatch 2, the number of tank slots in role queue was reduced by one, bringing the total number of players per team to five. According to game director Aaron Keller, developers hoped that losing a tank would speed up gameplay, as they believed that the original six-player teams rendered gameplay slow. It was also intended to ease the amount of things players and spectators need to watch out for. New maps were designed to include more cover options to compensate for reduced tank-based protection. To support this type of gameplay, damage heroes were buffed with increased movement speed, support heroes were given passive health regeneration, and tanks were redesigned to be able to take a more offensive role. Two characters received significant changes in their skill kit to fit the five-on-five format; tank hero Orisa had several defensive abilities replaced with offensive ones, in addition to increased self-sustainability, while Doomfist, a hero formerly in the damage role, was reworked to be a fast-moving tank.

Most of the team-based game modes and their corresponding maps from Overwatch remain in Overwatch 2, including Control, Escort, and Hybrid. Assault maps were considered unbalanced by the player community and were removed from standard play matches but remain available within arcade modes and custom games.

New game modes have been added with Overwatch 2:

- Push was introduced with the launch of Overwatch 2. In Push, teams vie for control of a robot pushing one of two blockades towards the opposing team's goal on a symmetric map, similar to a tug of war. The robot only moves towards the opponent's goal while at least one teammate is near while no enemy team member is close.
- Flashpoint was introduced with Season 6 in August 2023. Flashpoint maps feature one central capture point and four additional points around the map. After teams vie for control of the central point, one of the other four points becomes the next objective. The match continues until one of the teams has captured three points.
- Clash was introduced with Season 12 in August 2024. Clash maps have five objectives laid out in a sequential order between the teams' spawn rooms. Teams first fight to capture the central objective; when one team wins, the point closer to their opponents' spawn room becomes the next active objective. The objectives closest to each team's spawn room can be captured in three capture periods. The match continues until one of the teams completes five captures. In 2026, Clash was removed from core game modes and is currently only available in Stadium.
- Stadium was launched with Season 16 in April 2025. Stadium had been in development since the release of Overwatch 2, as the development team explored ideas for the game's next major core mode. Stadium matches are played by two teams of 5 in a best of 7 series, where each round takes place on a smaller version of a Control, Push, or Clash map. After each round, players receive Stadium Cash based on how well they played, which they can use to purchase upgrades to their character. Stadium is played in a third-person view by default. Originally, the mode was treated as a competitive-only mode, providing players that advance up through competitive ranks with cosmetic rewards. A quick-play version of the mode was released later on.

Among other quality of life improvements, Overwatch 2 includes a ping system to direct teammates' attention to specific points on the map.

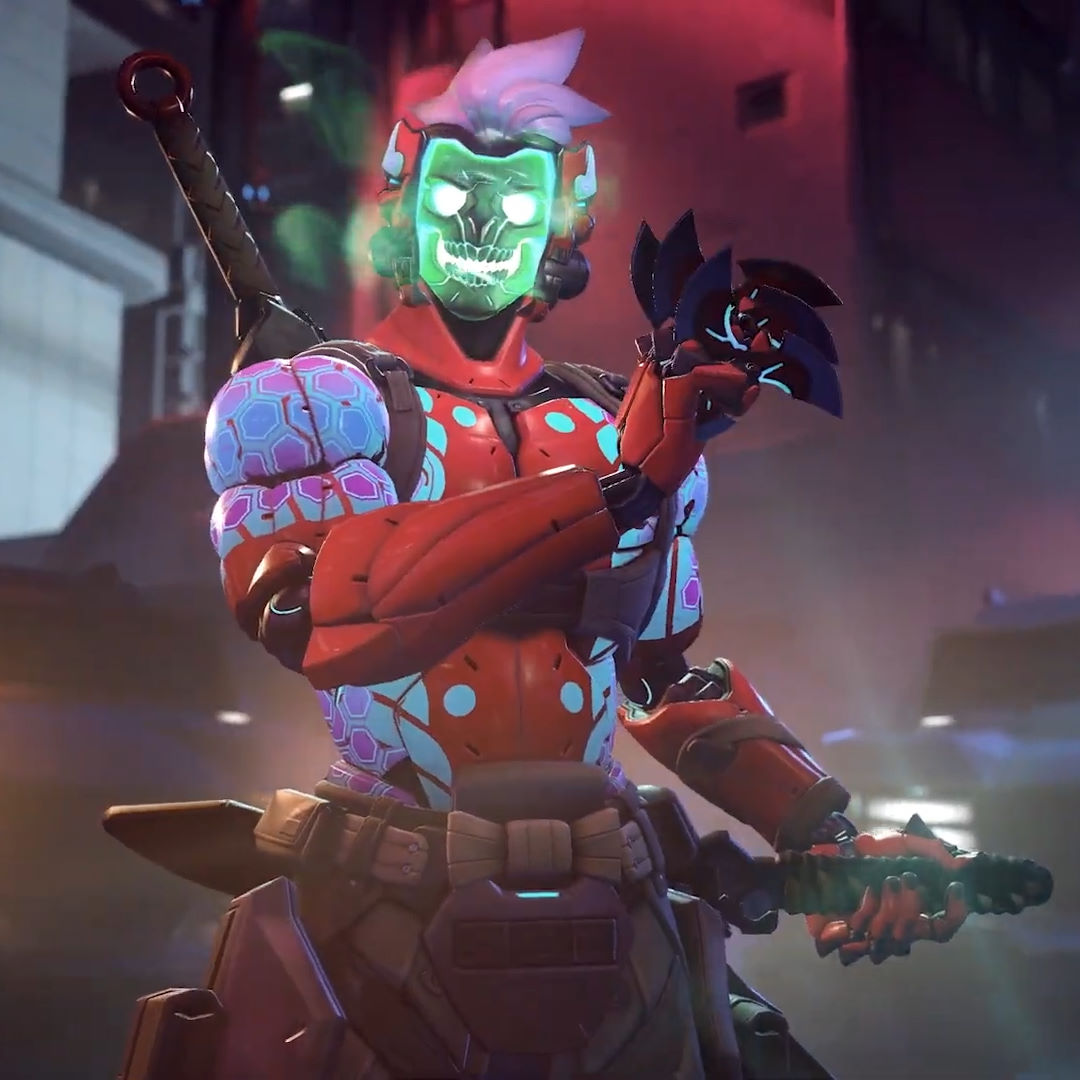
Cyber Demon, a cosmetic skin for Genji

Overwatch 2 was released as free-to-play as opposed to the premium monetization model of its predecessor. It also discontinued loot boxes in favor of a battle pass system which is offered on a seasonal basis and corresponds with the introduction of new maps and heroes. The game also includes an in-game store where players can purchase cosmetics directly. Blizzard stated that new heroes will be introduced as rewards on the free track of the battle pass, and players who fail to make the associated tier will have other routes to obtain the hero for free in later seasons. In addition to battle pass cosmetics, players can purchase seasonal cosmetics through the in-game store. Further, special events lasting two to three weeks have been offered, offering new cosmetics for completing various challenges as well as new cosmetics available for purchase. With Overwatch 2, Blizzard has also created collaborations with other franchises, including Blizzard's own Diablo IV, as well as content from third parties such as the anime series One-Punch Man and Cowboy Bebop and the Korean idol group Le Sserafim.

A Blizzard Battle.net account is required to play Overwatch 2, regardless of platform. Overwatch 2 features cross-progression, with in-game cosmetic items and progress being shared across PC and console versions. Unlocked cosmetic items, in-game currency, and player statistics from any Overwatch profile linked to such an account are merged, and are available on all platforms. Competitive skill ratings on console and PC remain independent of each other.

=== Post-release updates ===
With the start of Season 6, in August 2023, three story-based PvE missions were added to the game, with more planned to be released in the future. These advance the lore and narrative of Overwatch. These missions generally include multiple objectives, and are similar to previous limited-time event missions that were periodically available in the first Overwatch. Players are required to pay for access to these missions, and they were previously available within a battle pass bundle.

Hero Mastery courses were introduced in September 2023. These courses aim to help the player learn and improve their skills with a given character by requiring them to complete hero-specific maps as fast as possible while completing various objectives, scoring the player based on their performance. Courses are available for a limited number of heroes, with additional Hero Mastery courses added with new seasons. Hero Mastery courses were phased out of the game by Season 19 in late 2025, as Blizzard found the mode did not have the popularity of the other Overwatch 2 game modes.

With Season 9, starting in February 2024, a major overhaul of combat and the competitive system was introduced. All heroes gained a boost in health and passive healing, while buffs were applied to all characters with guns or similar weapons. This was intended to improve survivability, lessening the likelihood of being killed by a quick burst of fire, as well as preventing damage from being healed away too quickly. In contrast to the approach since Overwatch 2's launch, which updated a player's rank after winning 5 games or losing 15, the new ranking system resembled the approach of the original Overwatch, where a player's competitive ranking is adjusted after each game, with additional information provided about the aspects of the match that contributed to the change. With these changes, Blizzard announced that all players would have their competitive ranking reset and would need to perform ten matches to gain their starting competitive rank.

Blizzard reversed its decision to launch new heroes on the battle pass with the start of Season 10 in April 2024, instead making new heroes free for all players. The existing heroes added from Overwatch 2's launch to this point were also made available for all players, though those that had not yet unlocked them via the battle pass had to complete tutorial missions to unlock them fully.

Blizzard experimented with bringing back six-on-six team combat, gauging the playerbase's response through limited-time tests during Season 14 in December 2024. Additionally, special "Overwatch Classic" limited-time events have featured six-on-six gameplay with the rosters, skill kits, and maps from various periods in Overwatch's history. Since Season 15, in February 2025, a 6v6 competitive mode has been available to further assess the players' response to this format.

With the launch of Season 15 in February 2025, a new gameplay feature called perks was introduced across the standard play game modes. Perks impact gameplay by modifying existing abilities, like making Pharah's concussion blast pull opponents inward instead of pushing them away from the blast. Players earn experience points throughout a match, and can level up twice, getting to choose one of two perks with each level gained. Lead gameplay designer Alec Dawson said the idea behind perks was to avoid stagnation and allow the game to evolve instead of trying to achieve a perfect balance between all characters.

Season 15 also reintroduced loot boxes, which can be earned through gameplay, the battle pass, weekly challenges, and other mechanisms. Loot boxes can contain nearly any of the previously released cosmetic items, excluding those featured in the current season's battle pass or limited-time promotions. To address concerns about gambling, loot boxes are not directly purchasable. Each box is guaranteed to contain at least one Rare item, with Epic and Legendary items guaranteed within every 5 and every 20 loot boxes opened, respectively. Keller said the intent behind the new iteration of loot boxes was to make players feel rewarded for simply playing the game, rather than using them as a driver for microtransactions.

With the release of Season 16 in April 2025, a hero ban system was added to the game's standard competitive modes. Before the start of each match, the system allows players to vote for up to three heroes to be banned, with their votes weighted by order. Each team can ban two heroes, and the banned heroes are disabled for both teams for the duration of the match.

With the launch of Season 17 in June 2025, a map voting system was introduced to standard game modes. Before each match, players are presented with three maps selected by an algorithm, and may vote for one of them. The map for the match is then randomly chosen from among the votes cast.

With the introduction of Season 18, Blizzard will allow console players to use mouse and keyboard controls rather than a controller, though players will be queued in the "Mouse and Keyboard Pool" with players on computers, rather than the console queue.

== Development ==
=== Initial development (2019–2021) ===
Overwatch 2 was announced at BlizzCon on November 1, 2019, with plans that the game would maintain a "shared multiplayer environment" between it and the original Overwatch, so that players in either game could compete in the existing player versus player (PvP) game modes, retaining all unlocked cosmetics and other features. Jeff Kaplan, director for Overwatch, explained that this was a major decision and that he had to justify this "player-first standpoint" to Blizzard executives, given the current industry trend to draw in new sales. All new heroes, maps, and PvP modes were to be added to both games to maintain this shared environment.

While Activision Blizzard had anticipated Overwatch 2 would be ready by 2020 or 2021, the game's release kept switching. One reason was driven by management to convert the game into a free-to-play title, aligning with most other multiplayer games on the market, leaving the question of monetization open. Kaplan's original design for Overwatch, which allowed for players to switch to any other hero to counter opposing team composition, made it difficult to monetize the release of new heroes. This drove Blizzard to consider the battle pass approach, which was meant to balance player engagement with the game through its lifetime, and revenue from selling cosmetics. A second reason for the delay was difficulty in implementing Kaplan's ideas for PvE, as the game was not designed to handle large numbers of enemy forces from both an engine and gameplay design aspect.

According to Kaplan in a 2026 interview, both these issues were a result of the Overwatch League, first launched in 2017. The League grew significantly in the first years with a large amount of investment into the League, which also pushed into development of Overwatch to drive features that would be more amendable to the League than to regular players. Around 2019 and 2020, coupled with the COVID-19 pandemic, interest in the League significantly waned as it was failing to meet investment targets, with Kaplan calling it an albatross.

Without the financials from the League, Activision management put pressure on Blizzard to finish Overwatch 2, suggesting that Blizzard add more staff to Team 4, the Blizzard division created for Overwatch, as to match the team size typical for other popular free-to-play shooters. Blizzard resisted this, fearing the added time and costs to bring on new staff would take too much from the ongoing development, and wanted to avoid Activision's desire to release Overwatch in annual installments. This, in turn, made Blizzard pressure the Overwatch team to push for an earlier release for Overwatch 2. Rather than being able to focus on new gameplay aspects for Overwatch 2, Kaplan said the team was more forced into expanding the monetization options for the game to meet this demand. Kaplan was told by a Blizzard CFO in 2020 that Overwatch 2 must make a certain financial target in 2020 and several subsequent years by adding significant monetization to the game, or that the company would lay off a thousand people with Blizzard placing the blame on Kaplan for this. Kaplan considered this "the biggest fuck you moment I've had in my career", and rather than take that blame, Kaplan left Blizzard in April 2021.

=== Revamped development (2021–2023) ===
Due to the constant attention from Activision, the Overwatch team could not give Overwatch 2 full attention, and from 2021, several key staff members involved in its development left Blizzard in addition to Kaplan. Aaron Keller took over the role for lead developer on Overwatch 2, with pressure from Activision to release it as soon as possible. To make this happen and avoid a situation similar to the Titan cancellation, Blizzard opted to decouple the PvE and PvP elements, to release the improved PvP elements by 2022 and to eventually release the PvE elements later.

By mid-2022, Overwatch 2's conversion to a free-to-play title was announced. Blizzard affirmed that Overwatch 2 live services would replace those of the original game; the original Overwatch servers would be shut down on October 2, 2022. Players retained their existing cosmetics and in-game currency, with remaining loot boxes opened automatically upon the release of Overwatch 2. At least three new heroes were announced to be added to the roster, including Sojourn, a Canadian Overwatch officer, Junker Queen, the ruler of Junkertown, and Kiriko, the protector of Kanezaka.

Overwatch 2 runs on an upgraded version of the original game's engine which allows for larger map sizes to better support the new story-based player versus environment (PvE) elements. Additionally, all of the existing heroes received visual redesigns for Overwatch 2, although Blizzard did not expect every hero to have their redesigns finished when the game launched. Twelve of the existing 31 redesigns were completed at the time of Overwatch 2's reveal.

=== Release and removal of PvE elements ===
Overwatch 2 was released in early access for Nintendo Switch, PlayStation 4, PlayStation 5, Windows, Xbox One, and Xbox Series X/S on October 4, 2022. Kaplan stated when the game was announced that they were more concerned about quality of the product than timeliness of the release. Investor documents released in November 2021 reported that the initial 2022 release window was delayed to at least 2023, intended for "giving the teams some extra time to complete production and continue growing their creative resources to support the titles after launch". Kaplan anticipated that Overwatch and Overwatch 2 will ultimately merge into a single product to avoid having any engine differences affecting player experience. Technical director John Lafleur has stated they are also interested in supporting, at minimum, cross-platform progression and are looking at the possibility of cross-platform play. In the interim from its announcement prior to release, Kaplan left Blizzard in April 2021, with Aaron Keller taking over the lead development role, while the lead developer for new heroes, Geoff Goodman, left sometime in mid-2022.

In March 2022, Blizzard stated that they had put too much focus on Overwatch 2 over the past few years to the detriment of support for the original game, and so changed plans to release Overwatch 2 in parts, with the PvP portion to be released in beta form starting in April 2022 and the PvE part to come at a later time. This would allow them to also continue to support Overwatch alongside Overwatch 2's development. Later, Blizzard announced that the first wave of Overwatch 2 invitation-only betas would begin on April 26, 2022, and end on May 17. Access to the closed beta could be earned either by signing up for a chance to participate or by watching select Twitch streamers for a limited time on April 27.

The game without its PvE mode was released as early access on October 4, 2022, for Windows, PlayStation 4 and 5, Xbox One and Series X/S, and Nintendo Switch. That day, in addition to a large number of players, the game's servers were hit with a distributed denial of service (DDOS) attack that made it difficult for many to access the game. Additionally, as part of Blizzard's efforts to reduce smurfing, the use of new accounts by experienced players as to try to game the system, the company required all players to confirm their identity through a SMS message on their cell phone linked to their account. For many with prepaid cellular plans, particularly in the United States, they cannot use SMS on their plans, and effectively locked them out of Overwatch 2, though Blizzard stated they were working to resolve that issue. By October 7, Blizzard removed the need to verify one's identity for those that had played Overwatch since at least June 2021. As a means to make up this lost time to players, Blizzard planned to offer double experience point weekends and free cosmetic items to all players.

The game was to feature PvE game modes to be released later in the game's lifecycle, differentiating it from its predecessor. Similar to the special seasonal events, they would have consist of four-player cooperative missions against non-playable characters and were to be available persistent as opposed to a seasonal basis. In this mode, players would garner experience points for their hero and unlock new passive abilities called "talents", allowing them to influence how the hero plays. However, in May 2023, the developers announced that these extensive plans for PvE had been scrapped, fearing how they would impact the PvP elements. Instead the developers plan to offer story-based events as a replacement for the scrapped PvE. According to Keller, the concept behind the PvE elements were trying to bring forward gameplay from the cancelled Titan which Overwatch was originally based on. However, Keller stated that as they started shifted development to include the PvE elements, the overall project became unfocused, and the lead developers believed that they could not deliver a polished experience and opted to discontinue work in this direction. Jason Schreier of Bloomberg News reported in March 2024 that from his sources, Blizzard did not believe the PvE content sold well enough to continue, with the entire PvE having been eliminated and no further plans to continue the PvE missions going forward.

=== Rebranding and new approach to content ===
After removing the PvE, Blizzard focused on strengthening Overwatch's core PvP elements to avoid the game from languishing as a "dead game" according to Keller, but they still wanted to push on the story narrative. Around November 2024, it was suggested that a new storyline could be presented through new heroes they had planned, specifically with Vendetta overthrowing Doomfist as to take over the Talon organization. This led them to ways to use new characters along with auxiliary media to continue to tell a larger story within Overwatch without bringing in PvE elements.

In February 2026, at the end of Season 20, Blizzard rebranded the game as simply just Overwatch, and planned to drive the game around year-long story narratives over six seasons each year, the first being the "Reign of Talon". With this, the first season under the rebrand was named Season 1. The idea behind this rename was Blizzard's desire to treat Overwatch as a "forever game", improving and updating the base game without splitting resources towards a possible sequel, and maintaining player interest in the game. A native Nintendo Switch 2 port was also announced, releasing alongside Season 2 on April 14, 2026.

This new season also launched with five new heroes, with a new hero to come with each following season. With the larger hero pool, Blizzard introduced additional subroles within each of the main roles for categorizing the heroes and assist players with hero selection. Each subrole provides a new passive perk. For example, for Support heroes, subroles include Medics where healing allies heals themselves, Survivors who are healed when using movement skills, and Tacticians who can gain additional Ultimate charge up to 25% after reaching 100% charge. Keller said that 2024's Marvel Rivals had been a driver for expanding the hero pool, as they saw the excitement the game had drawn, and wondered if they could similarly drop 30 new heroes into Overwatch to revive interest.

In a July 2026 blog post from the game director, Aaron Keller, it was announced that there would no longer be new additions to the Stadium gamemode, though fixes and balance changes would continue. In the blog post, Keller said that Stadium was capturing only 3% of the playerbase, hence the decision to cease additions. Two new experimental 6v6 gamemodes were also announced in the same blog post, which Keller hoped would fix some of the problems found in other gamemodes.

With the new Season 4, starting in August 2026, the battle pass was reworked to break the offerings into smaller tracks that a player has some flexibility in the order which these are unlocked, allowing them to prioritize the cosmetics from the pass. Additionally, once per battle pass, the player can swap the final hero skin in one of these segments for another from a curated pool of skins from previous passes and store offerings. Blizzard also plans to bring back previous battle passes for purchase by mid Season 4 (September 2026), allowing players to work towards rewards from those passes or they had previously purchased but not completed, though pass items like in-game currency will not be available.

Similarly, with Season 5 in October 2026, past seasons' battle passes were made available for purchase. These unvaulted battle passes come with all of the cosmetic rewards they originally had, including hero skins, emotes, and sprays, but have their Mythic Prisms and Overwatch Coins replaced with Credits instead.

== Reception ==
Reception

Aggregate score
Aggregator	Score
Metacritic	PC: 79/100; PS5: 76/100; XSXS: 78/100

Review scores
Publication	Score
GameSpot	8/10
IGN	8/10
PC Gamer (US)	74/100

Overwatch 2 received "generally favorable" reviews from critics upon release according to review aggregator Metacritic.

Tyler Colp of PC Gamer was critical of Blizzard's handling of the sequel, writing that the game "intentionally or not, is trying to bury its predecessor alive." Colp added, "the original Overwatch is still in there, bruised and broken, but the weight of Blizzard's commercial and competitive expectations keeps piling up."

On the game's 5v5 gameplay dynamic, as opposed to its predecessor's 6v6 dynamic, IGN's Simon Cardy wrote: "it fully drags Overwatch 2 out of the stagnant meta swamp its predecessor found itself in over the past couple of years, but also denies itself some of the lustre of its satisfying team play." Cardy also wrote "if the pertinent question to ask about Overwatch 2 is simply if it's a fun game, then the answer right now is yes. It's still a fundamentally great hero shooter, just one that is perhaps not currently operating at the towering height of its powers."

Jessica Howard of GameSpot wrote, "Overwatch 2 takes the franchise from a genre-defining shooter to a trend-chasing one. As such, it has begun to feel less like a unique sci-fi, superhero comic book in video game form, and more like, well, a lot of other games." Chris Carter of Destructoid wrote that "Overwatch 2 doesn't have the same cachet that Overwatch 1 did, but I can still see myself jumping in for a few matches after a long evening. The charm is still there, even if the delivery system has been muddled, and the game is no longer a premium product with easy-access characters that you can readily jump in and out of. Perhaps the PVE update can change that, but it has some work to do." The team, acknowledging player feedback from the past eight seasons, revealed plans for significant updates in a candid blog to enhance competitive play, allowing players to better develop their skills and track progress through the ranks.

The game's removal of loot boxes in favor of a battle pass system received backlash. Players directed criticism toward Blizzard's decision to lock the character Kiriko as a free reward on the first season's battle pass. Following Kiriko's reveal trailer, CJ Wheeler of Rock Paper Shotgun wrote: "One look at PlayOverwatch's mentions on Twitter is, well, eye-opening. It reveals so much criticism of the battle passes, from cries of pay to win to complaints about the grind before the game's even dropped. There are quite a few accusations that Blizzard are money-hungry too." Further criticism was levied at both the pricing of cosmetic items found with the in-game shop, as well as the time it would take to unlock cosmetics solely through grinding for those players who opt against using real money within the shop. Many players and some game journalists highlighted that most other games include enough in-game currency in the battle pass to get the next one free.

Upon release of Overwatch 2 on Steam, the game received a large number of negative reviews and became the worst-rated Steam game of all time within a 48-hour time frame, leading many outlets to characterize the response as review bombing. User reviews were generally critical of Blizzard's handling of Overwatch 2 including the removal of the planned PvE content, which director Aaron Keller acknowledged. Players also expressed frustration at issues related to the company's recent history, including allegations of sexual harassment at Activision Blizzard. Nearly two-thirds of these reviews were written in Simplified Chinese, which - according to Niko Partners - stems from Blizzard's dissolution of its agreement with NetEase in China earlier in 2023, leaving Chinese players unable to play on local servers.

With the release of Season 15 in February 2025, which introduced perks into the core gameplay modes along with the return of loot boxes, user reception to the game improved, with Steam reviews trending from "Overwhelmingly negative" at launch to "Mixed" following the update.

Over 35 million users played Overwatch 2 in its first month of release in early access, compared to Overwatch which had only 15 million players three months after release. By July 2024, both Overwatch and Overwatch 2 had over 100 million players. At the launch of Marvel Rivals in December 2024, a team-based hero shooter with similar mechanics as Overwatch 2, Overwatch 2 saw nearly a 40% drop in concurrent player counts based on Steam players, attributed to the competition to Marvel Rivals. The game, when it was relaunched as just Overwatch, doubled its player count on Steam.

It was nominated for the British Academy Games Award for Multiplayer at the 19th British Academy Games Awards.
