= Fika =

Fika may refer to:

- Fika Emirate, a traditional state in Yobe State, Nigeria
- Fika, Nigeria a town and a local government in Yobe State
- Fika, a Swedish social tradition centered on a coffee break
- Fika, also called Jetpack Cat, a fictional character from the video game Overwatch 2

== See also ==
- Feka (disambiguation)
