= Payload (video games) =

Video game mode found in hero shooters

Payload is a video game mode found in hero shooters. The mode was popularized by the 2007 game Team Fortress 2 (TF2), where it was called "Payload", but other hero shooters have included the mode under different names. Some hero shooters have combined "Payload" with "Control Point", another mode standard of the genre, into a combo-genre of the two.

== Description and history ==
The eponymous "payload" bombcart featured in Team Fortress 2

Team Fortress 2 introduced its "Payload" mode with the game's "Gold Rush" update, released on February 24, 2008. In the mode, one team is tasked with escorting a cart equipped with a bomb, the bomb hence being the cart's payload. This team must push the cart to a final destination while the opposing team defends that destination from being reached. The cart only moves when the escorting team is near it, healing the team and providing supplies. The escorting team is on a timer, though it gains time upon checkpoints being reached. Both teams take turns escorting and defending; the winning team is the one that reaches the destination quickest, or if no team reaches the final destination, whichever pushes it furthest.

Similar game modes appear in later games, such Call of Duty: Black Ops III (2015), which includes "Safeguard". In the mode, an attacking team is tasked with escorting a robot along a path to a designated objective point. Overwatch (2016), and Marvel Rivals (2024), also include the mode under the names "Escort" or "Convoy", respectively. In Overwatch, the objective vehicle is specifically referred to as "the payload" in-game.

== Variant modes ==
Another game mode standard of hero shooters is a "Control Point" mode, which was also featured in TF2 under that name. An attacking team must capture a point, while the other team defends it from being captured. When a map features just two such control points, it is called "2CP" standing for "2 Control Points" or "2 Capture Points". The mode's name varies depending on the game. Overwatch, for example called it "Assault". Overwatch also featured a mode called "Hybrid", which combined the Payload and 2CP modes. In this mode, an attacking team would fight to capture a designated point, as if it were a first control point, while another team defends. If captured, the point would unlock a payload to escort or prevent reaching a destination. Hero shooters released after Overwatch have included similar game modes, such as "Convergence" in Marvel Rivals. Blizzard Entertainment, Overwatch's developer, published a statistical report detailing that "Hybrid" was the most-played game mode among competitive players below the "Masters 5" rank, or "where most players (statistically) spend their time".

A 2025 update to Overwatch 2 introduced the "Payload Race" mode, in which both teams were tasked with pushing their own payloads, while trying to prevent the other team from advancing theirs.
