= Victory dance (sports) =

A victory jig or victory dance is a celebration of a victory or success with a dance, shuffle or body movement. It is most commonly used in sports. The term can be used approvingly or abusively. A victory jig can be engaged in as a genuine celebration or as a means to humiliate or taunt an opponent.

== Examples ==
- Touchdown celebration, an example of a victory dance in American and Canadian football
- Gatorade shower, another type of victory dance in American football
- Goal celebration, an example of a victory dance in association football (soccer)

== Notable occurrences ==
- The 25 February 1964 fight between Cassius Clay and Sonny Liston when Clay did a "Victory jig" to taunt his opponent in the ring. See main article Sonny Liston vs. Cassius Clay.
- Unionist politician David Trimble's victory jig with Ian Paisley in Northern Ireland after the 12 July 1995 Drumcree March (Drumcree I).

== See also ==
- Victory pose
