= Bastion (Overwatch) =

Fictional video game character

- Overwatch character
- Bastion's appearance in Overwatch.
- First appearance: Overwatch (2016)
- Designed by: Arnold Tsang; Paul Lackey (voice)
- Voiced by: Chris Metzen

In-universe information
- Race: Omnic
- Class: Damage

Bastion is a character who first appeared in the 2016 video game Overwatch, a Blizzard Entertainment–developed first-person hero shooter, and the resulting franchise.

== Conception and creation ==
While working on a massive multiplayer online game concept for Blizzard Entertainment, developer Geoff Goodman suggested the idea of a large number of character classes for players to select, but with class specialization for each. Fellow developer Jeff Kaplan took this idea to heart, salvaging character concepts from Titan—a then-recently cancelled Blizzard project—and character artwork by artist Arnold Tsang for that project. Bastion's concept was inspired by one of the characters from Titan, the Ranger, and his mobile turret weapon. He was included as one of the final twenty designs to be featured on the main pitch image for a game codenamed Prometheus, which once approved, later materialized as Overwatch. Conceived as a robot able to transform into the turret itself, artist Arnold Tsang created many designs for Bastion, but the development team felt they were often too impersonal. Subsequent designs added "Ganymede", a bird somewhat resembling a yellow Northern cardinal, and they felt it immediately brought out a "whimsical" side of the character.

Initially, lead writer Michael Chu stated that Bastion had no gender, and as a result used "it" for pronouns. However, Overwatch 2 instead used masculine pronouns for the character. Bastion is also non-verbal, using different beeps to communicate. In-game subtitles do not give a translation for Bastion's beeps, instead offering such lines as "excited beeps" or "sad, hurt beeps." Bastion's voice was designed by Paul Lackey, who attempted to modulate his own voice but found it did not have the desired effect. He asked Chris Metzen to attempt it himself, and Metzen immediately took a liking to the process, using a headset to properly "play it like an instrument". For cinematics, they took a different approach to community his character, relying heavily on body language to convey emotion such as constantly shaking when absorbing new information, or still when on the attack.

=== Design ===
Bastion stands 7 feet 3 inches (220 cm) tall.

Like other Overwatch characters, Bastion received skins, unlockable cosmetic items to change his in-game appearance. When developing his skins, the development team created concept art for each of his different configurations for the skin's theme to ensure they not only felt consistent but unique, as well as not cause issues with the character's animations. The species which Ganymede is changes depending on which skin is equipped, with Blizzard wanting to ensure it fit into the skin's design. In particular, a LEGO-themed skin for the character was produced as part of a partnership between the companies for one of the game's seasonal events. The skin proved challenging for the development team to create, as LEGO was strict on how their product's pieces were represented in other media. They tackle the problem, they used the released LEGO Bastion toy for reference, resizing some of the pieces accordingly to help maintain the character's in-game proportions.

== Appearances ==
Bastion is a SST Laboratories Siege Automaton E54, a battle automaton originally designed for peacekeeping purposes; during the Omnic Crisis, they were deployed against their human makers becoming a symbol of the horrors of the war. Bastion was severely damaged in the field near the German village of Eichenwalde in the Black Forest during the final days of the war, and was left dormant and exposed to the elements. For more than a decade, he became overgrown with plant life and the nests of small animals, until he unexpectedly reactivated. He had developed a fascination with nature, but his combat programming still took over whenever he encountered anything perceived as a threat. Due to conflicts with fearful humans, Bastion largely avoids populated areas in favor of exploring the wild. He is usually accompanied by a small bird named Ganymede, who was building a nest on him when he reactivated, and both humanizes Bastion and makes him relatable. Bastion is eventually found by Overwatch's former chief engineer, Torbjörn Lindholm, who decides to take the omnic in after seeing Bastion resisting his combat protocol. Locating to Torbjörn's workshop, Bastion continues to help the inventor there.

Bastion is the focus of the animated short The Last Bastion, showing the moments when Ganymede inadvertently reactivated it. In March 2017, Bastion also appeared in Binary, an issue of the Overwatch digital comic series. The comic is set in rural Sweden, shortly after The Last Bastion, and details Bastion's first encounter with Torbjörn. Bastion was also the first character to be made available in Lego form through official collaboration between Blizzard and The Lego Group. A limited-time event in 2019 allowed players the opportunity to earn a Bastion skin based on the Lego version.

=== Gameplay ===
In Overwatch, Bastion could "Reconfigure" between a mobile form outfitted with a submachine gun ("Configuration: Recon") and a stationary form equipped with a Gatling gun ("Configuration: Sentry"). He also had the ability to "Self-Repair" and quickly regain lost health, and his "Ironclad" passive reduced damage taken. His ultimate ability was "Configuration: Tank", which allowed him to roll on treads and fire explosive rounds from a smooth-bore cannon for a short period of time. Bastion underwent a major rework for Overwatch 2, losing the Tank reconfiguration in favor of an artillery form that can bomb three locations on the current map. He lost the "Self-Repair" ability, instead gaining the ability to launch grenades as alternative fire. His sentry form became mobile, with a main gun that has more range and less spread, though the form is a temporary transformation with a cooldown.

== Promotion and reception ==
To promote Overwatch and the character, he was one of twelve heroes showcased in a playable build of the game at the 2014 BlizzCon convention. In October 2018, Blizzard partnered with LEGO and revealed their first Lego Overwatch set would feature a limited-edition Bastion featuring his appearance during the Omnic Crisis.

Upon the character's debut, Bastion developed a reputation for being one of the game's most "contentious" and "polarizing" characters in the game, particularly due to his gameplay. Video game journalists attributed much of this to how players perceived the character as too easy to be good, describing him as the "noob tube of Overwatch, and in particular how the game's "Play of the Game" feature would often highlight the character's achieved kills post-match. Disdain for the character remained even his gameplay was adjusted to a point he was considered unviable for competitive play, with Alena Alambiegi of Mashable describing him as "uniquely hated" and seen as a "running joke" in the game.

PC Gamer's Evan Lahti argued instead that the problem with Bastion's early version was not that the character was overpowered, but instead "not fun". Drawing a comparison to the sentry turrets of the Engineer in Team Fortress 2, he pointed out while they were much stronger the game provided players with many ways to counter them, and helped provide other game mechanics and roles with greater synergy to do so. This was not the case with Bastion however, who he described as Overwatch's least interesting playable character. His ability to self heal in particular removed several tactical options the character could implement, and made him as a result more of an isolated character in the game. In this way, Lahti suggested the issues with Bastion represented that the Overwatch development team could learn from the interconnectedness of Team Fortress 2's playable cast and "the way that each character enhances the identity of other characters".

Others however voiced praise for the design of Bastion's gameplay. Ethan Gach in an article for Kill Screen stated that due to the character within the scope of Overwatch the "mantra of 'aim better, click harder' actually does produce results", encouraging players plan and accept some fights as unwinnable, rather than charging in. Gach likened the frustration with Bastion to the mentality behind the Gatling gun, and despite its creator's hope that it would positively alter human behavior, human nature proved his ambitions wrong. Kotaku's Luke Plunkett meanwhile appreciated how different Bastion was as a character in the first-person shooter genre, noting that while he had options similar to others, his gameplay was rooted more in knowing the layout of the game's loaded arena and best location to deploy his gatling gun, comparing it to gameplay found in the multiplayer online battle arena (MOBA) genre of gaming. Plunkett stated he loved this strategic element of the character's design, and while imperfect, Bastion allowed him to enjoy a genre of gaming he had not in some time and praised how that resulted from the developer team "getting crazy with its character designs".

=== As a fictional character ===
Despite the negative reception the character's gameplay had received, as a fictional character Bastion was more well received after the release of Last Bastion, with Daily Dot writer Joseph Knoop stating while a one-note character Bastion was also "the first face of how Overwatch's omnipresent threat [...] wasn't purely a force for evil." Kris Ligman of Fanbyte stated that while the Overwatch story had "toyed with its 'post-war, reignited conflict' narrative setting in a few ways", Bastion's portrayal in the short could be interpreted as having post-traumatic stress disorder (PTSD). In this manner, they found it served as a powerful means of making the point, one they furthermore found sincerely moving. Nathalie Medina of player.one felt it helped to highlight omnics in the Overwatch universe as "a step-up from dumb robots" in how they can learn and experience their surroundings, reasoning it made sense such characters would suffer from PTSD, furthered by the character's body language of fear and dismay in the aftermath of the unintended destruction.

Nathan Grayson of Kotaku meanwhile found it opened serious discussion about PTSD amongst fans as well. He also appreciated the relatability of how Bastion was mentally transported to a "traumatic time" from the sound of something that sounded like gunfire. Grayson felt it was a strong point to ruminate on, noting that while in the environment of the time often made light of people suffering from such episodes as being "triggered" it was a reality for some people to be set off by the littlest things, and he praised Blizzard for addressing it. At the same time however he noted that fans also felt there was a disconnect between the short and the games, the latter of which showed Bastion returning to a life of conflict.

Stephen Asmirch of player.one meanwhile appreciated how Bastion's character interactions with Torbjörn illustrated omnics in the Binary comic, showing that while humanity still feared them due to memories of the war, the omnics were able to change their programming and directives, contrary to belief. Asmirch conceded that the comic was likely not intentionally bringing up these philosophical questions, but noted it illustrated how the Overwatch universe was less about clear good versus evil and instead more about how humanity reacts when technology achieves consciousness. Prior to Overwatch 2's release of its Invasion storyline content, Game Rant's Richard Warren expressed he found the dynamic between the characters interesting, and was intrigued to see if the game would illustrate how the two became friends given Torbjörn's own past conflicts with omnics. He further hoped that it could lead to character development in Overwatch 2's story for others in the cast such as Reinhardt who had their own past traumas with the omnics.
