= Brigitte (Overwatch) =

Fictional player character in the 2016 video game Overwatch

Brigitte Lindholm
- Overwatch character
- Brigitte's appearance in Overwatch
- First appearance: Overwatch (2018)
- Designed by: Ben Zhang
- Voiced by: Matilda Smedius

In-universe information
- Class: Support
- Origin: Gothenburg, Sweden
- Nationality: Swedish

Brigitte Lindholm (/brɪˈɡiːtə/) is a character who appears in the 2016 video game Overwatch, a Blizzard Entertainment–developed first-person hero shooter, and the resulting franchise. Added in a March 2018 update, prior to her in-game debut she first appeared in Dragon Slayer, an issue of the Overwatch digital comic series.

== Conception and development ==
Brigitte as a character had already been introduced within the lore of Overwatch as Torbjörn's daughter and friend to Reinhardt, through the Dragon Slayer digital comic released in 2016. Brigitte was developed alongside the character of Moira, who was the game's 26th hero. Originally named Pally, Blizzard had originally given her an ability to send out a healing orb to other teammates which had a long cooldown time. As they fleshed out both characters, they opted to push the tank-hybrid more for Pally, and transferred the healing orb to Moira, which would become part of her Biotic Orb abilities. As they worked more on Pally's character, they recognized her skill set integrated well with Brigitte's own story, and thus established the hero to the established lore.

Overwatch's developers designed Brigitte as a support–tank hybrid intended to counter the "dive" strategy that was dominating the current Overwatch metagame. With the dive strategy, a team would have a mobile character (such as Winston or Tracer) race into the back lines of a defending team while the defenders main tanks were elsewhere and unable to protect the weaker characters. This would be a sacrificial move by attacking teams, using the disruption to deal with the other remaining team. With Brigitte on defense, she would be able to stun and delay the diving character long enough to allow the defending team to react and close ranks, nullifying the dive strategy. Jeff Kaplan called the character, prior to her formal reveal, as "very needed" in the game.

In late February 2018, Brigitte was officially announced to be the 27th playable character in Overwatch. Matilda Smedius provides the voice for Brigitte. In a developer update video introducing Brigitte, Overwatch developer Jeff Kaplan described Brigitte's gameplay abilities, detailing her design as a support–tank hybrid.

The character spent a few weeks playable only on Blizzard's "Public Test Realm" (PTR) server, before she was made fully available to players on March 20. After Brigitte was initially made available on Blizzard's PTR server, PCGamesN noted her ability to disrupt "dive comp", a team composition featuring tank character Winston and offense character Tracer. The outlet explained dive comps are "defined by mobile characters able to pounce on key enemy characters - typically their supports - before they can react, then mopping up the rest of the team once an advantage has been won." PCGamesN connected Brigitte's ability to disrupt this aspect of the game's meta to Kaplan's statements about how she would "shake up the meta."

=== Design ===
Brigitte stands 6 feet 3 inches tall.

Like other Overwatch characters, Brigitte received skins, unlockable cosmetic items to change her in-game appearance. When developing them, the design team felt two major themes emerged: paladins and engineers. Her "Sol" skin was meant to tie into the former, reimagining her design as a medieval paladin while giving the armor a sun motif to suggest her gameplay role as a nod to the fantasy trope of light as a source of healing. Meanwhile, her "Engineer" skin was meant to resemble a prototype of her current armor, though this presented a design issue as it left several parts of her body unarmored and could affect her character silhouette. Greens and reds were incorporated into the design to suggest her role as a mechanic, but also reference Torbjörn's design.

== Appearances ==
Though the Overwatch video game does not have a standard campaign or story mode, Blizzard has used media external to the game to disseminate story elements regarding Brigitte's place in Overwatch's lore. Brigitte's introduction as a character precedes her addition to the game's roster; her first official appearance was in Dragon Slayer, the second issue of the Overwatch digital comic series. Dragon Slayer, released in April 2016, features Brigitte throughout, but focuses on Reinhardt defeating local thugs. She later appeared in the December 2016 issue Reflections in a panel featuring her family and Reinhardt. Brigitte later appeared in the November 2017 animated short, Honor and Glory, which centered around the character Reinhardt.

Brigitte made her video game debut in March 2018, when she was added to Overwatch's playable Hero roster. Coinciding with the announcement of Brigitte being included in Overwatch's playable character roster, Blizzard released a short animated origin story about her, focusing on her relationships with Torbjörn and Reinhardt. In 2026, Brigitte was one of several characters included in Overwatch Rush, a mobile game developed by Blizzard.

Brigitte's character backstory is tied into that of her father Torbjörn's and her godfather Reinhardt's. Outside of the game, Blizzard's fictional biography for Brigitte lists her full real name as Brigitte Lindholm, her age as 23, and her former base of operations as Gothenburg, Sweden.

In-universe, Brigitte is an adventurer and a mechanical engineer, following in the footsteps of her father, Torbjörn. Torbjörn, in Overwatch's lore, is the Chief Engineer for the Overwatch organization. One teaser for the Brigitte's character reveal described Reinhardt saving Torbjörn, after the latter gets severely injured on "Operation: White Dome", an Overwatch mission. In a letter to his pregnant wife, Torbjörn expresses that he will be allowing Reinhardt to name his daughter as a thankful gesture. After the dissolution of the Overwatch organization, Reinhardt chose to continue to fight for justice as a knight-errant. Brigitte requested to join him as his squire, and Reinhardt accepted and would train her in combat. Her responsibilities initially included maintaining Reinhardt's armor, but she increasingly began to have to heal Reinhardt's wounds. Brigitte began to believe her role was insufficient, and developed her own armor in secret to fight alongside Reinhardt. Brigitte also designed Reinhardt's shield.

=== Gameplay ===
In Overwatch, Brigitte is classified as a Support-class character, meant to provide aid for his team, though was described by Kaplan as having elements of the game's Tank-class, making her a hybrid character. Her primary weapon is a Rocket Flail, which she can swing about to damage enemies in front of her, and is able to damage multiple enemies at once. Her passive ability, "Inspire" works in combination with this, healing allies in a short radius around her as the flail causes damage. Alternatively, she can hold out her shield which generates a wide energy barrier that can absorb a limited amount of damage, though significantly reduces her movement speed.

Brigitte also has several abilities that require activation, though have a "cooldown" period after use and are unable to be used again during that duration. "Whip Shot" extends her flail in a long horizontal strike that can also knock back enemies. Meanwhile, "Repair Pack" can target allies, giving them a small amount of healing but leaving her unable to attack for a short window of time. Alternatively, the "Shield Bash" abilities becomes available when her shield is deployed, dealing damage to and pushing back enemies in front of her.

Lastly her Ultimate ability, "Rally", needs to be charged before use. The ability charges slowly during the course of gameplay, and can be charged faster through damage dealt to the enemy team or healing provided to allies. Once full the ability can be activated to increase her movement speed and provide additional health to her allies for a brief period of time. While originally it provided additional maximum health to allies, this was changed in a later update to giving them armor against incoming damage. Additionally, while Rally is active her shield's barrier becomes significantly larger, and can momentarily stun enemies struck with Shield Bash.

== Critical reception ==
Brigitte's reveal led to Stewart Chisam—a game developer on Hi-Rez Studios' Paladins—posting a tweet, comparing Brigitte to Ash, a character from Paladins. When reached for comment by Kotaku, Chisam expressed that the tweet was a light-hearted joke and an "a bit of an homage to tons of 'Overwatch Clone' comments Paladins received when it first came to market."

Since her debut, Brigitte was positively received, with fan art of her quickly appearing on social media websites such as Twitter shortly after her reveal. Cass Marshall of Polygon attributed some of the appeal to the contrast between her and fellow Overwatch character Reinhardt: "equally resolute, but less hardened by battle and more driven by wanting to prevent damage than inflict it." While many depicted her as a knight in this context, Marshall applauded that other artists emphasized her as cute. Ana Valens of The Mary Sue praised her as one of the best characters introduced in Overwatch, praising Blizzard Entertainment for portraying a "incredibly strong, extremely competent with blacksmithing" woman and not leaning into butch character tropes. Instead Valens felt they portrayed her as between feminine butch and "soft femme", depending on what she's doing at any given time, which helped portray that women falling into those categories could be "big, strong, and buff too".

Ryan Gilliam of Polygon saw Brigitte as modern take on the concept of a Paladin in fiction, holy warriors that fought to protect but also to defend, acting as a mix of "brawn and peace". He stated in science fiction settings the concept was rare, but felt that Blizzard had managed to capture that aesthetic well in presenting a character that seemed more geared to defend others than simply attack. He additionally praised how well Brigitte fit in alongside Paladin-type characters from World of Warcraft, another game by Blizzard, and described the duality she represented between character archetypes as "beautiful and interesting".

=== Regarding gameplay ===
While Brigitte was added to Overwatch on March 20, 2018, she was not added to the servers for the 2018 Overwatch League season until the start of Stage 4, commencing in May 2018. To that point, many teams in the League had excelled on the dive composition, particularly the New York Excelsior, which had nearly secured their spot in the season finals. With Brigitte was added, other teams adapted her into their team compositions and were able to effectively counter the Excelsior's dive strategies, while Excelsior had not adapted to Brigitte's abilities during season play. Though Excelsior still was the League's top seed leading into the finals, they lost their semi-final round to the Philadelphia Fusion, in part because the Fusion had used Brigitte in their compositions to challenge Excelsior's dive approach.

In the months following her release, innumerable high-profile players complained that Brigitte was too powerful given her kit of crowd-control abilities, being able to hit multiple targets with her main attack and being able to stun with her shield bash. Some players argued to the point that Blizzard should remove the character from the game, creating a viral call out to "Delete Brig". In particular, Brigitte became a central support character in the popular "GOATS" team composition (named after the Overwatch Contenders team that popularized it) that includes three tanks and three support which had proven extremely difficult to counter; Brigitte's role in the GOATS, outside of healing, was to use her shield bash to break enemy character's shields. Blizzard had recognized the problems with Brigitte in the current metagame involving GOATS, but had no immediate plans to remove her from the game. Instead, they continued to work on various buffs and debuffs to make Brigitte less overpowering, in particular, removing the ability to stun characters through shields. With the start of the 2019 Overwatch League season, the GOATS composition was heavily used by many teams, drawing negative audience reactions as such games tended to be viewed as unexciting. Some people on social media continued to blame the character of Brigitte for the lackluster league games, and in some cases, started harassing her voice actress, Matilda Smedius. Many more fans stood behind Smedius against the harassment, with Smedius appreciative of their support.

In July 2019, Blizzard introduced a role queue feature that limited teams to a composition with two of each of the three classes in competitive and most other game modes, which made a GOATS composition impossible, though Blizzard stated that this change was not aimed to deal with any specific team composition. Along with this feature came a character rework for Brigitte aimed at making her viable within the new default ruleset of the game, eliminating or ameliorating most common complaints usually brought up by players. Blizzard released a limited-available Brigitte cosmetic skin at the start of the 2020 Overwatch League season called "GOAT Brigitte" (GOAT for Greatest of All Time) but cheekily alluding to the GOATS team composition.
