= Victory pose =

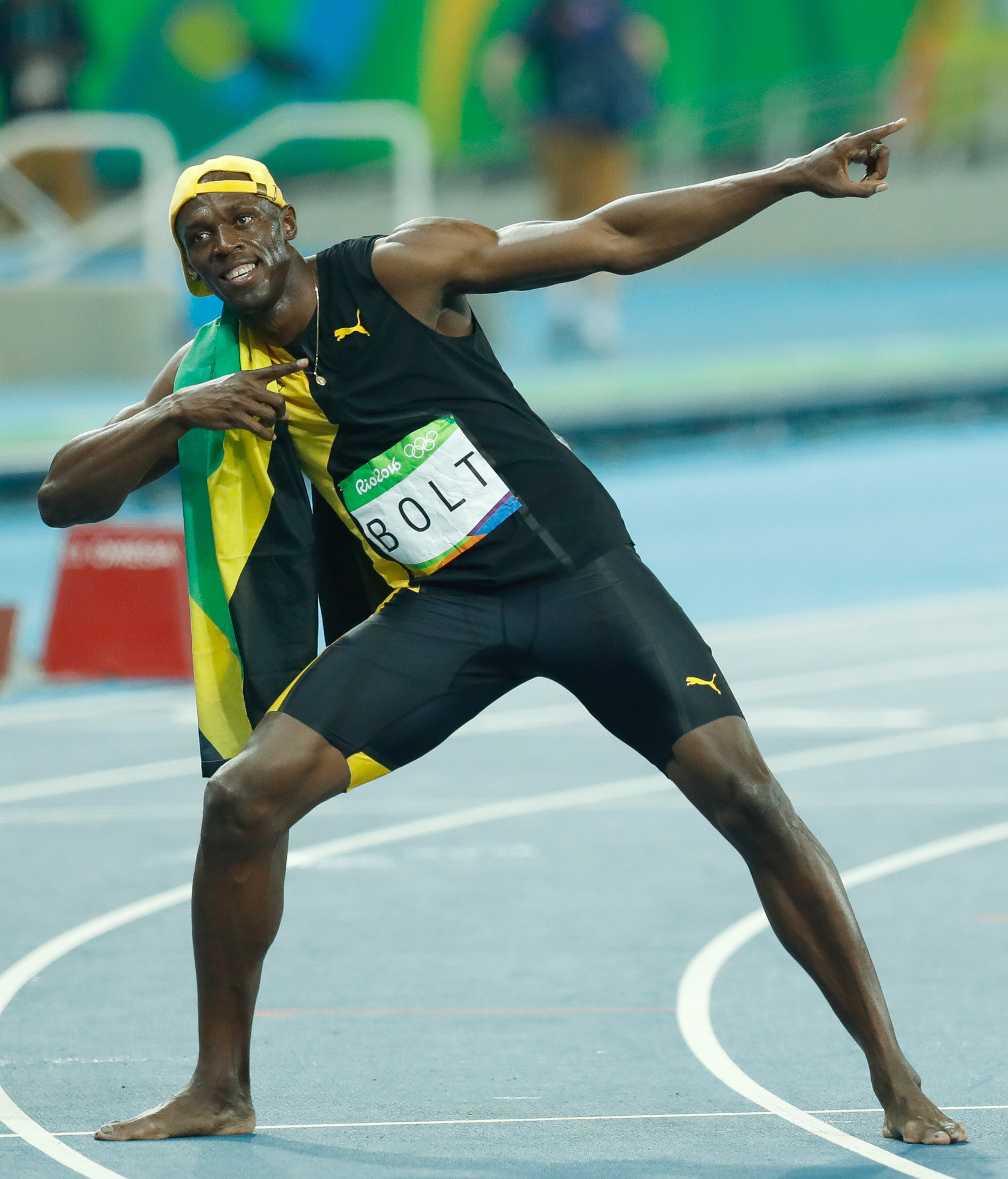
Usain Bolt posing after a victory

A victory pose is a pose assumed by a person to celebrate victory, particularly by athletes and other sportspeople. Victory poses often involve raising the arms in the air.

== Video games ==
Pre-programmed victory poses by fictional characters in video games have been the subject of controversy, particularly where the victory pose has been regarded as overly sexualized. Strategy first-person shooter Overwatch in particular was criticized by press for its overly sexualized victory poses, leading to certain animations being removed from the game by developers Blizzard.

Role-playing games such as Final Fantasy often have accompanying victory poses after encounters. These snippets of animation are usually played alongside a short music clip (known as fanfare), with characters celebrating their win.

== See also ==
- Victory dance (sports)
- Sentai Pose
- Dab
