= Torbjörn (Overwatch) =

Fictional character in the 2016 video game Overwatch

Torbjörn Lindholm
- Overwatch character
- Torbjörn's appearance in Overwatch
- First game: Overwatch (2016)
- Created by: Jeff Kaplan
- Designed by: Arnold Tsang and Renaud Galand; Ben Zhang (turrets, weapon)
- Voiced by: Keith Silverstein

In-universe information
- Class: Damage
- Origin: Gothenburg, Sweden
- Nationality: Swedish

Torbjörn Lindholm (/tɒrbjɒrn/) is a character who first appeared in the 2016 video game Overwatch, a Blizzard Entertainment–developed first-person hero shooter, later featured in its resulting franchise and subsequent 2022 sequel, Overwatch 2.

== Conception and development ==
While working on a massive multiplayer online game concept for Blizzard Entertainment, developer Geoff Goodman suggested the idea of a large number of character classes for players to select, but with class specialization for each. Fellow developer Jeff Kaplan took this idea to heart, salvaging character concepts from Titan—a then-recently cancelled Blizzard project—and character artwork by artist Arnold Tsang for that project. Kaplan created an eight-page pitch for a first person shooter concept to propose the idea which included a series of proposed characters, among them a called "Mechanic" clad in armor and wearing a welding mask. The character's abilities would have utilized sentry turrets and teleporters, while his weapons would have included a nailgun and a sledgehammer.

While Torbjörn was not the first character created for Overwatch, his design, meant to bridge between Warcraft and Overwatch, became the baseline for nearly all other asset design for the game.

=== Design ===
Torbjörn stands 4 feet 7 inches (140 cm) tall.

Like other Overwatch characters, Torbjörn received skins, unlockable cosmetic items to change his in-game appearance. One of which was "Blackbeard", a pirate-themed skin they felt was perfectly suited to the character due to his short stature, eyepatch, and long beard. While the skin changes the design of his exhausts to cannons, it also adds a ship steering wheel to his back, that spins during gameplay. Meanwhile, when developing his beach-themed "Surf 'N Splash" skin, they originally considered covering him with flotation devices and nautical equipment, but felt the result was too close to his Blackbeard skin. Instead, they decided to lean into a more fun aspect for the character, making his weapons resemble pool toys and floaties, while his vents resemble sandcastles, with the idea being that he is watching after his grandchildren at the beach.

== Appearances ==
Torbjörn Lindholm is a dwarfish Swedish engineer and weapons designer, and a founding member of Overwatch. His armor comes equipped with a mobile forge, and he carries a Rivet Gun that shoots molten slag and a Forge Hammer for construction and melee attacks. His Deploy Turret allows him to toss a turret a short distance away, which will then self-deploy before targeting and firing on any opponent in its sights. His Overload ability briefly increases his armor, and improves his speed and attack attributes for a short amount of time. His ultimate ability Molten Core allows him to shoot several globs of molten metal on the ground, which damages any opponent that stands in it.

Torbjörn believes that technology should serve a better vision for humanity, putting him at odds with his employers, who wanted to control the weapons with artificial intelligence. His deep-seated fear of sentient machines, dismissed at first as paranoia, became reality during the Omnic Crisis, during which he was recruited by Overwatch. His engineering knowledge proved invaluable to achieving Overwatch's aim of ending the Omnic Crisis. After Overwatch was disbanded, his weapons were stolen or stashed away, and Torbjörn has set out to ensure they are not used to harm the innocent. On one of his journeys, he encountered an active Bastion unit. After seeing it resist its original combat protocols in favor of the wildlife, Torbjörn decides to take the omnic in.

At launch, Torbjörn would have to place a turret and then hammer on it to bring it up to a higher level, while his ultimate Molten Core would be used to give him a burst of energy and speed as well as briefly upgrading the turret to its highest value. Torbjörn could also collect scrap left by fallen players, when he then could use to make armor pickups for his allies. Lead game designer Geoff Goodman called Torbjörn a "little overly defensive focused", and wanted to make the hero more capable on offense in non-payload map. These new updates were added in an October 2018 patch.

Torbjörn is voiced by Keith Silverstein.

== Promotion and reception ==
To promote Overwatch and the character, Torbjörn was one of twelve heroes showcased in a playable build of the game at the 2014 BlizzCon convention, while additional material included a cosplay guide and promotional images themed around holidays.

Xia Yikie of Chinese website Games.sina.com.cn described him as the most "time-traveler-like" character in the game, feeling he most directly resembled dwarves of fantasy literature. However, upon discovering his Swedish origin, they felt his design was appropriate for the character, drawing parallels to Vikings from the region. They further pointed out Gothenburg's role as one of the most industrially developed locations in Northern Europe, and that coupled with Sweden being the origin of inventor Alfred Nobel helped tie Torbjörn's identity as a weapon designer and his unique gameplay to his cultural identity, praising Blizzard's attention to detail in that regard.

Jake Selway of Game Rant praised how Overwatch's "Invasion" content helped expand his lore. Describing the Gothenburg mission as playing well into the character's skill set due to its reliance on turrets, he praised how the presentation of Torbjörn's workshop reflected his bold character. He further expressed appreciation for how the mission helped flesh out his character in a way that was prior relegated mostly to supplemental material such as the comics, particularly in how it illustrated his relationships with other characters and overcoming past prejudices with regards to Bastion. Lastly, he praised how his relationship with Brigitte was portrayed, adding that the mission "does a great job of showing Torb as a family man, something that could make him relatable for any parents who enjoy the hero shooter".

The editors of fashion publications PopSugar and Who What Wear in an article for Kotaku described his design as common in video games, and akin to "what happens when Santa joins a bikie gang". While they praised the character for being aware of his style and sticking to it, they felt it was over-accessorized. Stating that less elements would have given it a more cohesive appearance, they particularly questioned why his beard appeared bolted to his stomach.

=== Analysis of gameplay ===
Justin Groot in an article for Kill Screen likened Torbjörn's character concept to Team Fortress 2's Engineer class, suggesting the developers likely asked themselves what World of Warcraft archetype would fit and found dwarves to be the appropriate answer. Going further, he suggested the character was designed less for a first-person shooter, and more a tower defense game. He observed that every "class-based first-person shooter has at least one character designed for people who do not enjoy the core mechanics of first-person shooting", and Torbjörn was adequate with his own weaponry, his turrets fulfilled this requirement. Groot argued that this worked well with the concepts of Overwatch's character diversity, and for more highly mobile characters like Pharah to feel unique, characters like Torbjörn provided a more grounded, earthy counterpart and helped the game's roster feel complete.

Prior to the character's rework, Torbjörn's turrets proved a contentious topic regarding Overwatch's gameplay. Nathan Grayson of Kotaku shared Groot's comparison of the character to the Engineer, but felt that the turrets proved too efficient at killing opponents, often allowing the Torbjörn player to stay out of harm's way and rely exclusively on them. Grayson felt to some extent while the character was indeed overpowered for Overwatch, he still required skill to play effectively, and questioned how much of the issue was actual player learning curve. Others such as Adam Rosenberg for Mashable emphasized the difficulty of players using a video game console controller over keyboard and mouse to contend with the turrets, and pointed out the significant outcry from the player community, with just one Torbjörn player able to sit back and continually heal his turrets.

This frustration extended into the game's "Play of the Game" feature, a post-match highlight reel, that would often show the Torbjörn player either dead or doing something uninvolved while the turrets killed opponents, becoming an internet meme. Meanwhile, Riot Games took player response to characters such as Torbjörn and the Team Fortress 2 Engineer into consideration when developing the character Killjoy, a turret user in their game Valorant, and wanted to implement the character's turrets in a way that ran contrary to player perception.
