= Reinhardt (Overwatch) =

Fictional video game character

Reinhardt Wilhelm
- Overwatch character
- Reinhardt's appearance in Overwatch.
- First appearance: Overwatch (2016)
- Created by: Jeff Kaplan
- Designed by: Arnold Tsang; Ben Zhang (equipment)
- Voiced by: Darin De Paul

In-universe information
- Class: Tank
- Origin: Stuttgart, Germany
- Nationality: German

Reinhardt Wilhelm is a character who first appeared in the 2016 video game Overwatch, a Blizzard Entertainment–developed first-person hero shooter, and the resulting franchise. Conceived from a desire to include a fighter in a mech suit, the concept originated from the cancelled game Titan, and went through several iterations through development. Voiced by Darin De Paul, Reinhardt is an aging German soldier who fought during a robot uprising known as the Omnic Crisis. Forced into retirement due to his age, he returns to help after a second uprising occurs from the group Null Sector.

Reinhardt was well received, praised for both his personality and the anachronism of being a knight figure armed with a large hammer in an age of firearms and tactical gear, and how his character has matured over the course of the game's lore. He has also been the study of academic analysis into character design, observing how his appearance, movement, and hypermasculine aspects play into his character's overall presentation and make him endearing to players.

== Conception and creation ==
While working on a massively multiplayer online game concept for Blizzard Entertainment, developer Geoff Goodman suggested the idea of a large number of character classes for players to select, with class specialization for each. Fellow developer Jeff Kaplan took this idea to heart, salvaging character concepts from Titan—a then-recently cancelled Blizzard project—and character artwork by artist Arnold Tsang for that project. Kaplan created an eight-page pitch for a first person shooter concept to propose the idea which included a series of proposed characters, among them a character called "Juggernaut" clad in white heavy armor and armed with a flamethrower and flail. They knew they wanted to have a physically imposing character in a mech suit, but were unsure how to handle the design, resulting in several early drafts. They chose to take a look at other Blizzard games for ideas, particularly the paladins of World of Warcraft and the space marines of Starcraft, fusing different design concepts together in an effort to create something both familiar and new.

As development progressed, the design turned into a large red armored figure with a horned helmet. The character was selected to be one of the final twenty designs to be featured on the main pitch image for Prometheus, which once approved, later materialized into Overwatch. The earliest version of the character's design was an African warrior hailing from the fictional city of Numbani. Called Wildebeast, the design went through various tribal-themed concepts, with the flamethrower replaced by an arm-mounted shield while the flail was occasionally replaced with a one-handed club or hammer. Another concept that followed was to have a little girl piloting the armor, an idea they explored again later with the character Orisa. Ultimately they chose to go with a more traditional looking armor set for the design. Kaplan in an interview with IGN commented that while many would have taken this concept into an "imposing, menacing" direction, creative design lead Chris Metzen felt Reinhardt should be "the guy you want to hang out with in the bar who's always buying you drinks."

=== Design ===
Reinhardt in his armor stands 7 feet 4 inches (223 cm) tall. The armor itself resembles a suit of traditional knight armor, with large pauldrons and spiked boots. While the underarmor is grey with various tubes and rubber elements, the outer armor is a silver colored metal with red highlights, and has yellow glowing elements on the chest and visor, as well as a jet propulsion engine protruding from the back. Underneath the armor, Reinhardt is a tall white muscular man with white hair and a full beard, while a vertical red scar covers his blinded left eye. When designing his armor, the development team initially wanted to emphasize a golden lion motif; while these elements were toned down, they were later reused for his "Lionheart" in-game skin cosmetic outfit.

His equipment was designed by artist Ben Zhang, consisting of a large two-handed hammer and a shield projector on his left lower arm. The projector resembles a lion's head, and opens its mouth to project a large rectangular energy shield Reinhardt can hold out in front of him. Meanwhile, his hammer features a lion themed coat of arms on the front, while the back has several rocket engines protruding from it. The text "J08" and "08" is visible on various elements of his design, particularly on his shoulder, chest, and hammer. This number is a reference by Arnold Tsang to the number of revisions the armor went through for the original Titan game project, with his appearance in Overwatch being the eighth iteration. When his character design was updated for Overwatch 2, the number on the armor was changed to "09".

== Appearances ==
Reinhardt Wilhelm is a German man introduced in the 2016 first-person shooter Overwatch. Voiced by Darin De Paul, he hails from Stuttgart, Germany and stylizes himself as a knight under the codes of valor, justice, and courage. A member of the Crusaders, a military group using power armor and armed with large rocket hammer weapons, they fought a type of robot called omnic that became hostile during an uprising called the Omnic Crisis. After the death of his mentor and the loss of his eye, he joined a worldwide effort to combat the omnics, Overwatch. After the war ended and omnics gained sentience, Overwatch remained a global peacekeeping task force until Reinhardt was forced into retirement at the age of fifty, and Overwatch disbanded after accusations of corruption. Years later, as another group of omnics start an uprising, Overwatch reforms, and he offers his help to the group again without hesitation.

Reinhardt's story continues in the sequel's "Invasion" storyline, where he fights the omnic threat "Null Sector" alongside his allies. Traveling with Brigitte to see her father and Reinhardt's friend Torbjörn to figure out Null Sector's intentions, he encounters the peaceful omnic Bastion in Torbjörn's care. Though he initially acts hostile, they talk him down and work as a group as Null Sector's fleet arrives on the attack. In expanded media for Overwatch, Reinhardt was featured in the 2017 short Honor and Glory, which details not only the events of the attack that cost Reinhardt his mentor, but also the aftermath and his time during retirement. Reinhardt further appears in the Zero Hour short, which released in 2019 and served as an announcement for Overwatch 2. Later, in the Overwatch Undivided comic, he is shown to form a romance with another member of Overwatch, the sniper Ana. Meanwhile in other games, Reinhardt was one of several characters included in Overwatch Rush, a mobile game developed by Blizzard.

=== Gameplay ===
In Overwatch, Reinhardt is classified as a Tank-class character, designed to absorb large amounts of damage from the enemy team in team compositions while protecting their teammates. Specifically, Reinhardt was designed to be an "anchor tank", able to control the pace of action by providing shields and act as a vanguard for their team. His primary means of attack is with his rocket hammer, which he can slowly swing from side to side to deal damage, and will push enemies back when they are struck. Alternatively, he can project an energy shield in front of him. The shield can absorb attacks but has finite durability and slows his movement. When not in use, the shield will slowly repair itself to full health. In early gameplay development for Reinhardt, he was planned to be able to throw his hammer into a group of enemies. While Blizzard felt this was "cool in concept", the end result was awkward in practice as it required him to retrieve his hammer afterwards. While the idea was scrapped, it was later tweaked and reused for the character Junker Queen.

Reinhardt also has several abilities that require activation, though have a "cooldown" period after use, and are unable to be used again during that duration. "Charge" causes him to propel forward at high speed, damaging enemies in his path and can pin enemies against walls along the way to cause significant damage to them. While its difficult to steer, he can cancel the ability by activating it again. Meanwhile, "Fire Strike" launches a projectile from his axe. The attack has two charges with their own cooldown, and can pierce enemy shields. Lastly his 'ultimate' ability, called "Earthshatter", requires to charging before use. The ability charges slowly during the course of gameplay, and can be charged faster through damage dealt to the enemy team. Once the ability meter is full, the ability can be activated to deal damage to enemies in front of Reinhardt, knocking them down and temporarily stunning them for a brief period of time.

== Promotion and reception ==
Reinhardt's portrayal as an older, matured figured in the Overwatch universe has received praise. In addition, his large rocket hammer has been called a standout feature, being recreated by fans and discussed in academic study in how it adds to an endearing "hypermasculine" image.

To promote Overwatch and the character, he was one of twelve heroes showcased in a playable build of the game at the 2014 BlizzCon convention. Additional material included a cosplay guide, promotional images themed around holidays. Several figures have also been released including a Nendoroid figure produced by Good Smile, an action figure by Hasbro that includes an attachable shield, a Lego set that pairs him with the character D.Va, and Funko Pops. Other merchandise includes a hoodie themed after the character produced by clothing company Jinx.

Reinhardt has been well received since his debut, and was the most popular Tank-class character during the first game's open beta. His hammer has also been seen as an iconic weapon, with a scholarly paper published examining the physics of the weapon published in the Journal of Physics Special Topics, while fans have attempted their own recreations of the device. The Daily Dot's Joseph Knoop praised him as one of the best characters in Overwatch, stating that no tank character in gaming "has ever been so boisterous and an absolute blast to spend time with as the loudmouthed German grandpa." He further enjoyed that while Reinhardt was clearly aware of his age, his experiences of his past had turned him from a cocky individual into one more concerned with doing good than just chasing glory.

Roy Graham of Kill Screen enjoyed how Reinhardt seemed to "anachronize" the in-game battles to give them meaning and also how his reliance on melee attacks with his hammer contrasted against other characters brandishing firearms. He suggested that the character's design played into his Germanic heritage, by presenting someone whose soul is "leaden with the terrors his country has both suffered and visited upon others", yearning for an age of chivalrous behavior in contrast to one of "machine guns, bombs, and particle cannons". Graham emphasized that despite Overwatch occurring in the far future, Reinhardt seemed to reflect generations of trauma and regret experienced by the German people over World War II. While he acknowledged the comedic tone of the character, he felt Reinhardt suffered from carrying a weight greater than other characters in Overwatch due to being himself a survivor, and this weight was reflected in his drive to carry his teammates by taking point on the battlefield.

His characterization in the series' "Invasion" storyline was also examined, with Kenneth Shepard of Kotaku feeling that his comments towards omnics could be considered microaggressions. Shephard acknowledged that while Reinhardt's racism towards omnics could be excused due to being a veteran, he appreciated that the character was called out by others for his prejudices and seemed to actively reconsider them. GameRant's Jake Selway meanwhile felt Reinhardt benefited significantly from his portrayal in "Invasion" feeling it portrayed him as complex but also highlighted his flaws as both a warrior and a man given his troubled background. Describing it as an "uncharacteristically somber idea of Reinhardt's deeply-held grudges and regrets", he emphasized that his callous behavior towards the omnics as simply robots and quick rise to attack Bastion, it was a stark contrast to the normally positive, cheerful heroic character seen during the course of the game. While he felt this might shock some players, Selway expressed that by showing him in this manner it allowed a "much more human and flawed" Reinhardt to shine, and gave the "Invasion" mode a deeper meaning by "adding depth to an already-iconic hero."

=== In academic analysis ===
University of Jyväskylä researchers Tanja Välisalo and Maria Ruotsalainen in the book Modes of Esports Engagement in Overwatch described him as representing a narrative stereotype of an old soldier, returning to the battlefield because he was needed, and to prove he can be of use. They noted that while he was portrayed as steadfast and somber, his voice lines in the game focusing on honor and glory often felt more in line with the portrayal of his younger self as someone "arrogant, overly confident, [and] thirsting for battle". They argued that these contradictions in his character "contribute to the humanness of the character, strengthening their mimetic component", furthered by certain skins utilizing his younger appearance in an anachronism which they felt enhanced the fantasy aspect of his overall character.

They further described him as fulfilling a hypermasculine stereotype in the game due to his broad shoulders and large body even beneath the armor, with his oversized hammer supporting this as well. They praised how the game added to his slow movement through the use of the in-game camera swaying as he walked, creating "an embodied experience as this massive old warrior" and helping the player to understand his fiction. However, despite the character's emphasis on seeking "glory" through his voice lines and backstory, his actual gameplay was designed to be slow and non-aggressive. They observed that during the course of the game's various patches he also remained relatively untouched, which they attributed to the stability of his design and reflected Reinhardt's core personality traits, those being "steadfast and dependable, but also uncompromising and resistant to change". They found this familiarity in his design and consistent gameplay helped endear the character to players, and demonstrated how "both mechanics and narrative can foreground the synthetic component" of a fictional character.
