= Ana (Overwatch) =

Ana Amari
- Overwatch character
- Ana's appearance in Overwatch
- First appearance: Overwatch (2016)
- Created by: Michael Chu; Geoff Goodman
- Designed by: Arnold Tsang; Ben Zhang (young); David Kang (weapons)
- Voiced by: Aysha Selim

In-universe information
- Class: Support
- Nationality: Egyptian

Ana Amari is a character who first appeared in the 2016 video game Overwatch, a Blizzard Entertainment–developed first-person hero shooter, and the resulting franchise. Voiced by Aysha Selim, she is a sniper and member of the global peace-keeping force Overwatch, and the mother of fellow playable character Pharah. Created originally by lead writer Michael Chu as a backstory character, when the development team wanted to include a "skill-based support healer" into the game, she was made playable to fill that role. Taking design elements from a character concept of an alchemist, they gave her gameplay abilities that they felt would make her a good counter to the game's existing sniper, Widowmaker.

Ana was received acclaim upon her release, seen as a character defying stereotypes and praised for her representation as an Egyptian woman, something they felt Blizzard had previously fumbled with Pharah. Additional praise came from her presentation as an older woman amongst the game's cast, both bringing into play a different body type but also a mature kind of femininity. Her role as a mother additionally received praise, with several outlets noting that such was often underrepresented in gaming and in contrast to how other titles often approached the subject.

== Conception and development ==
Ana had already been part of the narrative of Overwatch from the creation of the Pharah character, according to Blizzard's lead writer Michael Chu; they wanted Pharah's parents to be important characters of the Overwatch group that would influence Pharah, and Ana had been established as a sniper in Pharah's story. When they started brainstorming new playable heroes, the idea of an alchemist was raised, leading to the concept of a "skill-based support healer", according to Chu. This led to them to consider making Ana this new playable character, as these support sniper skills would contrast well against those of the already-established character of Widowmaker.

Artist Arnold Tsang designed character to have a triangular-shaped cape to help give her a distinct silhouette from other characters and make more easily identifiable during combat. This feature helped make her movements more unique too, with the animation team developing new technology for the game to give the cape a free and malleable shape, in their words treating it as a separate character. Additional elements of her design were meant to tie into post-apocalyptic imagery, wanting her to feel "rugged and resourceful", and someone that lives on the outskirts of society. Other artists also contributed to the character, such as Ben Zhang who developed her young appearance, and David Kang who designed her various weapons.

=== Design ===
Ana stands 6 feet tall.

Like other Overwatch characters, Ana received skins, unlockable cosmetic items to change her in-game appearance. Particularly her "Wasteland" skin was meant to tie into the character's post-apocalypse themes, incorporating straps, pipes and canister designs into it to illustrate a character scrounging up any materials she could to survive. Meanwhile, the "Tal" skin took inspiration from Korean culture, and was designed by Kang at the suggestion of a friend on the development team. Kang, himself of Korean descent, wanted to keep the tal mask element of it accurate but ran into a problem as the most famous depictions of such masks were the male variety. As a result, he worked aspects of the female mask into the design, creating one that was neither strictly one or the other for the skin.

== Appearances ==
Hailing from Cairo, Ana Amari was considered the best sniper in the world, and rushed in to support the unprepared Egyptian defense forces during the Omnic Crisis. Her marksmanship and her critical decision-making skills led to her being recruited by Overwatch, and she served for many years as Jack Morrison's second-in-command during the conflict, while trying to be a mother to her daughter, Fareeha. Even with her command responsibility, Ana refused to give up going on combat missions. Remaining in service well into her fifties, Ana was believed to have been killed by Widowmaker during a hostage rescue. Ana hesitated to make the kill shot, realizing that her target, Widowmaker, was in fact her friend Amélie Lacroix. The latter shot the former through her rifle's lens, destroying her right eye, then proceeded to kill the hostages. Though Ana survived, Overwatch soon disbanded.

Initially choosing to remain out of combat as the world became embroiled in conflict, Ana realized she could not remain on the sidelines, and has rejoined the battle to protect her homeland. Ana soon reunites with former Overwatch Strike Commander Jack Morrison, now Soldier: 76. Together, they agreed to work together to take down new threats around the world, as well as hunt down the truth behind Overwatch's original collapse. She was one of many former Overwatch agents to receive Winston's recall message to reestablish the organization, but refused to answer, believing her generation should step aside to avoid repeating the same mistakes. Instead, Ana persuades Cole Cassidy to return to Overwatch with a new team of heroes.

Ana was the first character to be added to Overwatch following its launch; she was announced and available to play on the Public Test regions on July 12, 2016, and was playable by all PC and console players on July 19, 2016. In January 2019, Blizzard published a short story Bastet that focused on Ana and her relationship with Soldier: 76. The story was written by Michael Chu and illustrated by Arnold Tsang. Alongside this, Blizzard ran the first of a mini-event, a two-week long "Ana's Bastet Challenge" that awarded players that won a number of games across any mode, or watched designated Twitch streams with cosmetics related to this story. Ana appears as a playable hero in Heroes of the Storm. In Overwatch 2, she also appears in the digital comics "Legacy" and "Old Soldiers". She has also received Mythic skins, including A-7000 Wargod released in Season 6 as part of the Invasion Battle Pass and Ra Ana released in May 2026.

=== Gameplay ===
In Overwatch, Ana is classified as a Support-class character, with sub-role Tactician, meant to provide aid for her team. Her weapon, a biotic rifle, is a sniper rifle that deals damage over time to enemies, while healing allies struck by the weapon. In addition she has two abilities that require activation, though have a "cooldown" period after use and are unable to be used again during that duration. The first, "Biotic Grenade", throws a projectile that activates on contact, that heal and damage enemies in its area of effect, while also reducing the amount of healing enemies receive from outside sources, and increasing it instead for allies. Meanwhile, "Sleep Dart" temporarily stuns enemies, and is able to knock them out of some attacks.

Her Ultimate ability, "Nano Boost", needs to be charged before use. The ability charges slowly during the course of gameplay, and can be charged faster through damage dealt to the enemy team or healing provided to allies. Once full the ability can be activated to target a single ally and increased their movements speed, damage, and damage resistance for a brief period of time. In Overwatch 2 base mode, the movement speed increase was removed; Nano Boost now grants increased ally damage, while reducing damage taken.

For Heroes of the Storm, most of her abilities remained unchanged. However, she gained an alternative to Nano Boost called "Eye of Horus", which when activated has her take a stationary sniper position on the field for a brief period of time, and greatly increases the range of her sniper rifle. In Overwatch 2, Eye of Horus is no longer a base ultimate alternative; it is a Stadium mode item that grants shields and allows Nano Boost to be applied through walls up to 60 meters.

== Promotion and reception ==
Hasbro released a figure of Ana based on her Shrike skin, packaged with fellow character Soldier: 76 in 2019.

Ana was well received upon release, with outlets such as Kotaku's Cecilia D'Anastasio citing her as an example of one of the "badass, stereotype-defying ladies" in the franchise, and Cass Marshall of Polygon calling her a "slam dunk on the part of the Overwatch designers" in regards to her visual design, lore and gameplay. Ana Valens of The Mary Sue heavily praised Ana as one of the best female characters introduced in Overwatch, stating "In an industry obsessed with creating playable female characters that are young eyecandy with hourglass figures [...] Ana is the opposite of everything we’ve come to see in conventional female video game characters." To this end she noted the character's maturity, role as a leader and multifaceted skills as both a sniper and a healer. In addition she praised how the franchise portrayed motherhood through her interactions with Pharah, describing it as complicated due to having both aspects of pride and regret, something she felt "should feel familiar to any mother of adult children." Valens additionally praised Blizzard Entertainment for emphasizing Ana's beauty not through traditional means but "through her age, her wisdom, her elder femininity", and called the character one women young and old could equally look up to.

Nico Deyo of Paste offered her own in-depth thoughts on the character. She offered her own praise for the portrayal of an older woman in gaming, down to Ana's voice which she described as having a "smoky, crackly quality to it", and how rare it was to see a woman show signs of age in video games as a medium especially in comparison to male characters. In addition she focused on the maternal aspect, a subject she felt Blizzard "historically" mishandled in previous titles in contrast to how fathers are often portrayed, with mothers either lacking entirely or simply "reproductive only, or feature some other lurking problems". She cited that in contrast it was a significant part of why Ana's character was the way she was, expressed through everything from her in-game dialogue to decorative cosmetics, and was not hampered by her gameplay. Deyo further added that Ana was written "in such a way to complicate existing ideas about motherhood", committing acts of violence to create a better world for her daughter despite moral reservations, and that it offers "a nice twist on the idea that mothers only exist to be flatly nurturing, gentle creatures. She's acerbic, pragmatic and doles out concern and destruction in equal measures."

Another aspect Deyo focused on was in terms of the character's cultural portrayal, namely as a woman of color. To this end she noted that some of Ana's dialogue is entirely in Egyptian-accented Arabic, and found it interesting to hear Arabic in a "more accurate and positive context". She found it a heavy contrast to how Middle Eastern and many other Arabic-speaking in other first-person genre titles are portrayed, often used as cannon fodder, and how it painted her as "an actual character given much love and focus". Amr Al-Aaser of Vice voiced similar thoughts. Despite being highly critical of Pharah, he felt Ana was a more positive example of Egyptians as a whole due the lack of forced cultural imagery and use of an actual Egyptian voice actress for the character. He stated that once he heard her speak, let alone in a positive tone, that for him it was "momentous [...] Overwatch had, for once, allowed me to hear Arabic as I knew it."
