= Hero shooter =

Video game genre

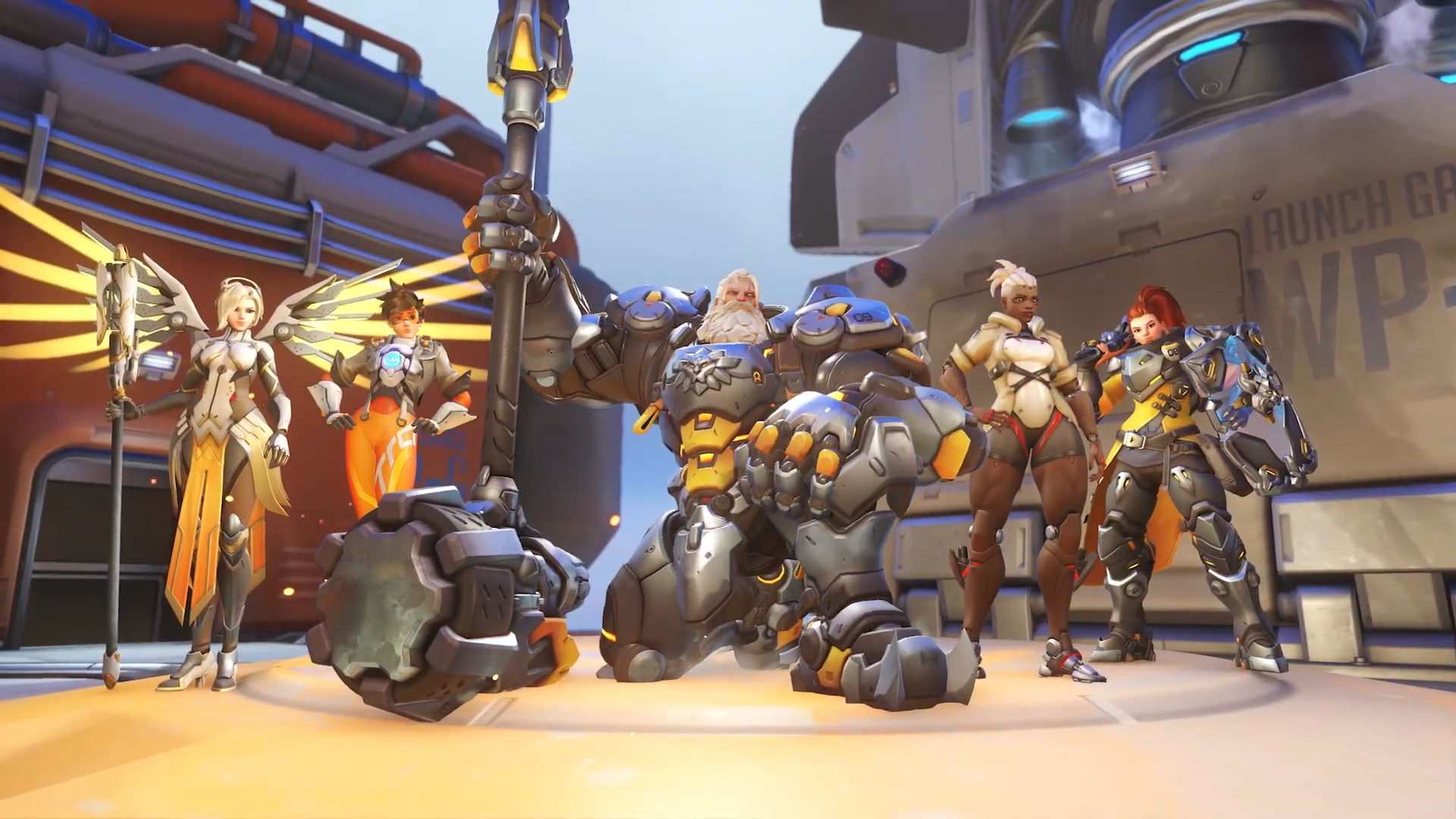
Heroes in Overwatch each have a distinct playstyle, role and personality. Heroes (left-right): Mercy, Tracer, Reinhardt, Sojourn, Brigitte

A hero shooter is a subgenre of shooter games which emphasize "hero" characters that have distinctive abilities and/or weapons that are specific to them. This type of gameplay encourages players to choose heroes based on their strengths and the role they play in the team's overall strategy. A hero shooter can be a first-person shooter or a third-person shooter. The genre has become popular for its focus on teamwork and character variety.

== Game design ==
Hero shooters are a variation of multiplayer first- or third-person shooters, where players form into two or more teams and select from pre-designed "hero" characters that each possess distinctive attributes, skills, weapons, and other passive and active abilities. Hero shooters strongly encourage teamwork between players on a team, guiding players to select effective combinations of hero characters and coordinate the use of hero abilities during a match.

Hero shooters take many of their design elements from older class-based shooter, multiplayer online battle arena (MOBA) and fighting games. Some incorporate the role-playing elements from MOBAs, where as a match progresses, the player can opt to buy or improve predefined skills for their selected hero, adapting these to the dynamics of the match. In other hero shooters, players have freedom to change to a new hero at respawn points as to alter team composition to better challenge their opponents.

Because of the focus on heroes as distinctive characters, hero shooters will often feature more narrative elements than traditional team-based shooters, providing backstories for each character and an emphasis on the story and world in which the games are set.

=== Modes ===
Hero shooters include various game modes to play. Standard modes include "Control Point", "King of the Hill", and "Payload", with these names varying by game. These modes, along with "Capture the Flag" were included in the 2007 video game Team Fortress 2 (TF2). Control Point and Payload modes feature an attacking and a defending team, whereas in King of the Hill, both teams fight for control over a designated area.

The Control Point mode is also referred to as "2CP", standing for "2 control points", when there are only two such objectives specifically. The 2016 game Overwatch introduced its "Hybrid" mode, combining Control Point and Payload; the attacking team has to gain control over a designated objective, before it then can unlock a payload to escort. Hero shooters after Overwatch, such as Marvel Rivals, have since included similar game modes.

== History ==
=== Origins ===
The origins of hero shooters can be traced back to early tactical shooters that featured class-based playable characters in multiplayer modes. Games like Battlefield 1942 and Team Fortress Classic featured specific roles that a player could select that would come with their own unique abilities and sometimes specific weapons that were not available to the other classes. While the majority of tactical shooters were the main games that featured some form of class based mechanics, other shooters also featured the same gameplay style and had their own take on the system such as Star Wars: Battlefront and Conker: Live & Reloaded.

Valve's Team Fortress 2 (2007) is credited by video game writers for establishing the core framework of the subgenre. While TF2 featured the same class-based system as its predecessor, each specific class was now its own unique "character," which came with a specific personality and appearance. This made the roles more fleshed out and feel more like real people rather than just nameless playable characters. As Valve continued to expand the game, the company released media external to the game, including a series of Meet the Team videos which helped to build out each character class and their backstory. These Meet the Team videos established the use of cinematic narrative videos used in future hero shooters to introduce new hero characters and introduce narrative elements.

=== Mainstream popularity (2016–present) ===
The subgenre had a substantial rise in popularity with the announcement of Battleborn and Overwatch in 2014, with both games later releasing nearly at the same time in 2016. Battleborn, by Gearbox Software, was the first game to use "hero shooter" in their press material in September 2014. Gearbox made the comparison of Battleborn as a hero shooter to how their Borderlands games were "shooter-looters". Gearbox considered a hero shooter, distinct from MOBAs as it was a first-person shooter first and foremost, but similar to "character-centric games [and] fighting games, hence the ‘hero’ in hero-shooter". Overwatch, announced by Blizzard Entertainment a few months after Battleborn's announcement, was heavily inspired by Team Fortress 2 and MOBAs. Overwatch had evolved out from Blizzard's cancelled Titan, a class-based team shooter which the team had devised a large number of classes, which had caused scope creep and led Blizzard to cancel the project and cut the team. To save what they could, the remaining developers revised the classes into individual heroes with detailed backstories and personalities to make a team-focused hero shooter. Overwatch proved more popular of the two games, and by January 2021, Gearbox opted to shutter Battleborn's servers. The rise in popularity of Overwatch was followed by a flood of similar games like LawBreakers (2017) and Gigantic (2017). The popularity of hero shooters also caused existing games that had used roles but without specific characterization, such as Call of Duty and Battlefield, to incorporate designed characters and narratives into their games.

Modern popular hero shooters include Overwatch (2016), Paladins (2018), and Marvel Rivals (2024). Other games expand on the hero shooter with other gameplay facets, such as Valorant (2020) that includes tactical elements, and Apex Legends (2019) which is a battle royale game using heroes.

Not all hero shooters are successful, as the market had become saturated, particularly with live service features. Concord, developed by Firewalk Studios and published by Sony, was released in August 2024, but within two weeks, Sony delisted the game, refunding those that purchased it, and discontinued further development on it. The game was considered a failure by media writers due to a combination of a flooded market for live-service games and a lack of interesting characters or lore with Concord, leading to low sales and player counts. Similarly, Highguard, developed and published by Wildlight Entertainment, was released in January 2026, but shut down in March 2026 due to a rapid drop in player count and criticism on the lackluster gameplay.

Overwatch 2, which replaced the original Overwatch in 2023, had also seen criticism from players due to changes made between it and the original Overwatch, and also faced competition from Marvel Rivals. In February 2026, Blizzard Entertainment announced a major revamping of their approach to the game, rebranding Overwatch 2 as just Overwatch and making changes to appeal more to players, which lead to a significant boost in player counts in the weeks that followed.

== See also ==
- Character class
