= Mercy (Overwatch) =

Fictional character in the 2016 video game Overwatch

- Overwatch character
- Mercy as she appears in Overwatch 2
- First appearance: Overwatch (2016)
- Created by: Jeff Kaplan
- Designed by: Laurel Austin (preliminary); Arnold Tsang (final); Ben Zhang (equipment)
- Voiced by: Lucie Pohl

In-universe information
- Class: Support
- Nationality: Swiss

Mercy is the call sign of Angela Ziegler, a character who first appeared in the 2016 video game Overwatch, a Blizzard Entertainment–developed first-person hero shooter, and the resulting franchise. Voiced by Lucie Pohl, she is a Swiss doctor who provided key medical support for the original Overwatch group. In-game, she is a support-class hero who can heal, buff, and resurrect teammates.

The character is one of the more popular in the game, being noted by Blizzard to be the most played support character during the game's beta. However, her resurrect ability has been criticized in competitive and professional play levels, given the swing in momentum the ability creates. Her gameplay mechanics have undergone various reworks and patches in an attempt by Blizzard to make her a more well-rounded playable hero.

== Development and design ==
=== Art and character ===
Mercy was one of the first twelve Overwatch characters introduced at Blizzard's BlizzCon 2014 event. A Polygon story covering the event noted Mercy was equipped with feathery wings, a healing stream, and a pistol. Mercy is voiced by Lucie Pohl, a German voice actress. While Blizzard had been trying to find an actor native to the area that could perform a good Swiss-German accent, they found Pohl's accent to be good for the character and selected her instead, according to lead writer Michael Chu.

In concept art for Overwatch, prior to her final design, Mercy had been represented as a black man with white hair and a broad build, but otherwise having similar outfits and abilities as the released version. The character was originally named "Angelica", with "Mercy" being the name of the character now known as "Pharah". Confusion among the game's beta testers arose, which involved players switching to Angelica when requested to switch to Mercy. As a result, Blizzard renamed Mercy as "Rocket Dude", before the character became known as Pharah, while simultaneously, Angelica was renamed Mercy.

In addition to her default skin, Mercy has received themed cosmetics, such as during the game's 2017 "Year of the Rooster" event. During May 2018, Blizzard partnered with the Breast Cancer Research Foundation to offer a limited-time "Pink Mercy" skin that can be purchased by players, as well as a corresponding tee shirt with all proceeds going to the charity to support breast cancer awareness (akin to the pink ribbon). Blizzard reported that the charity sale raised over US$12.7 million, the largest single-year donation that the Breast Cancer Research Foundation had seen.

On Overwatch's accompanying website, Blizzard published a fictional biography for Mercy, listing her real name, age, and base of operations: Angela Ziegler, 37, and Zürich, Switzerland, respectively. The fictional bio also describers her as "a peerless support, a brilliant scientist, and a staunch advocate for peace." In the Overwatch universe, she is known to have been affiliated with Overwatch, being their head of medical research, and operating as a field medic and first responder while with them. She ascended to these positions in Overwatch via becoming the head of a prominent Swiss hospital, after which she developed a breakthrough in the field of applied nanobiology, which attracted the attention of Overwatch. Although she disagreed with the militaristic methods implemented by Overwatch, she used their resources to develop her winged Valkyrie swift–response suit. Mercy found herself at odds with her superiors and others in Overwatch, despite her medical contributions.

Mercy is also mentioned in Genji's fictional biography, with one line stating, "Hanzo believed that he had killed his brother, but Genji was rescued by Overwatch and the intervention of Dr. Angela Ziegler."

In a fictional news report published by Blizzard, Mercy is quoted as commenting on the end of the Overwatch organization, describing the growing negative relationship between Soldier: 76 (Jack Morrison) and Reaper (Gabriel Reyes): "after Morrison's promotion to strike commander, his relationship with Reyes changed, the tension became more pronounced as time went on. I tried to mend things. We all did. Sometimes when the closest bonds break, all you can do is pray you stay out of the cross fire."

=== Gameplay design ===
While Blizzard has made various changes to all of the heroes since the game's release, Mercy has seen very significant changes, including a complete rework of her skill kit, maintain to address how her ability to resurrect downed team members has impacted the game. At release, Mercy's ultimate ability was "Resurrect", which revived any recently eliminated teammates within a certain range, granting them full health and a brief invulnerability. Blizzard's developer notes on their July 21, 2016, patch for Overwatch referred to Resurrect as "one of the most powerful abilities in the game." Timely and strategic use of Mercy's Resurrect ability was considered by players to be a game changer, either saving a defending team from a defeat, or allowing an attacking team to continue an offensive push despite several eliminations. In August 2016, Blizzard added a buff to Mercy's "Resurrect" ability, as well as her general healing abilities, in order "to solidify her role as a strong, single-target healer." Prior to a patch in September 2016, post-match Plays of the Games in competitive play were frequently dominated by a Mercy player using the Resurrect ability, requiring Blizzard to rework how the game selected Plays of the Game to reduce this frequency.

Blizzard found that Mercy players overemphasised the "Resurrect" ability, as "it incentivized Mercy players to hide away from important battles, instead of taking part in them". With a September 2017 update, Mercy's "Resurrect" was moved out from being an ultimate ability to a standard skill with a long cooldown. Blizzard introduced her new ultimate, "Valkyrie", which significantly buffs all of Mercy's abilities, reduces cooldowns and gives her the ability to fly for fifteen seconds Blizzard felt by keeping the Resurrect as a skill and adding the new Valkyrie ultimate, it "gives her the opportunity to make big game-making plays and opens a number of new options for her". Even with her kit change, Blizzard has continued to fine-tune the abilities within the public test servers to try to achieve a proper balance. Jeff Kaplan said that Blizzard continued to find that with the new kit, Mercy players still kept out of battle save to use Resurrect, when they want the character to be treated as great healer for all team members. A further adjustment was made to Mercy in a January 2018 patch; whereas the Valkyrie ultimate originally had reset the Resurrect cooldown and provided a second Resurrect that could be used immediately, the patch eliminated the reset and second Resurrect. The Overwatch developers stated that they found that many Mercy players were still holding back and using the immediate Resurrects granted by Valkyrie to swing control of the game and which was difficult for opposing teams to counter.

During the beta development period of Overwatch 2, Blizzard developers reworked Mercy's mobility. Developers noticed if made to jump during this ability at a specific time, Mercy would be launched into the air, and noted that many players were incorporating this into their gameplay. Blizzard received backlash over these changes, with some players calling Mercy more clunky and awkward to play. In response to the player feedback, Blizzard stated that Mercy launching into the air was a bug and further tweaked the ability in a subsequent patch, reworking it so that a jumping mechanism would be included as a feature. Players voiced further discontent with these changes, causing Blizzard to rollback the removal of Mercy's "super jump".

In February 2023, with Overwatch 2 then its early access phase, Mercy received significant nerfs to the cooldown rate of her Guardian Angel ability, movement, and healing per second.

== Appearances ==
Mercy first appeared in the 2016 video game Overwatch. Lacking a traditional single-player campaign, Overwatch had minimal in-game lore and character backgrounds. These were instead shown through map designs and character voice lines, and elements established in tie-in media.

Blizzard added seasonal events to the game to support ongoing interest, with some events including story elements; Mercy made an appearance in several of these events. In April 2017, Blizzard launched the Uprising event, which included a player versus environment co-op game mode. The default version of the mode limits players to four characters, which included Mercy. The mode was set seven years before the events in the main game, in which a strike team consisting of Mercy, Torbjörn, Reinhardt, and Tracer are tasked with thwarting an attack on London perpetrated by an extremist group. Mercy also appeared in the Mercy's Recall Challenge event, launched in November 2019.

Mercy returns in the sequel, Overwatch 2, which launched in October 2022. She appears as a main character in Loverwatch, a dating sim visual novel which Blizzard released as part of a Valentine's Day-themed seasonal event for Overwatch 2.

Mercy is briefly featured in the tenth issue of the Overwatch digital comic book, where she is seen reading a letter, implied to be Genji's. Mercy was also the focus of Valkyire, a short story released on November 11, 2019. Written by Michael Chu, it focuses on the period around her joining the Overwatch team. The story tied into Mercy's Recall Challenge. In 2026, Mercy was one of several characters included in Overwatch Rush, a mobile game developed by Blizzard.

=== Gameplay ===
Classified as a support hero in Overwatch and its sequel, Mercy fills "the classic healer archetype", with healing being her primary function. Though her gameplay design has gone through several iterations with considerably more significant reworks compared to other Overwatch characters, her function as her team's healer has maintained throughout these changes. In 2015, during the original game's beta period, PC Gamer noted "her job is simply to glue herself to a friendly and not die," and in 2023, Kotaku wrote that "as she exists now [in Overwatch 2], Mercy's primary function is as a pocket healer and damage booster."

As a healer, a player using Mercy can see colored ghost images of their teammates through any obstacle, with the color indicating their health levels, and when in-sight, can see the health bar of the teammate. Mercy is equipped with the "Caduceus Staff" and "Caduceus Blaster". The Caduceus Staff possesses two firing modes: the primary fire, when connected to an ally heals them for as long as they are tethered to the healing stream, while the secondary fire buffs an ally's damage output. The Caduceus Blaster is a small pistol which can deal effective damage at close range, but is otherwise weak. Even equipped with the pistol, Mercy's kit design remains largely of a pacifist nature and she is the only player character in the game that cannot reliably score kills. Some players use Mercy with an offensive approach. Kotaku noted that many of these so-called "Battle Mercies" are often ridiculed, as firing the pistol is perceived to detract from time spent healing teammates. However, some Mercy players maintain that the pistol is useful in self-defense.

Her abilities include "Guardian Angel" and "Angelic Descent". Mercy can use Guardian Angel to fly directly towards a targeted teammate, including those that have recently been eliminated, either to move quickly across the field or near a teammate to apply her staff's powers, or to dodge enemy fire. While aloft, Mercy can use the Angelic Descent ability to slow her rate of falling, provide more maneuverability. She also has her "Resurrect" ability, allowing her to revive one fallen teammate shortly after they are killed, though leaving her vulnerable for a few seconds during the process and has a long thirty-second cooldown. Her Ultimate ability is "Valkyrie", which gives her omni-directional flight and several boosts for fifteen seconds: passive self-healing, increased "Guardian Angel" range and speed, increased five healing per second and damage boost range, chain healing and damage boost to all nearby allies of the target for the same amount, increased sidearm fire rate, and infinite sidearm ammo. Because Mercy is more mobile compared to other supports and is able to heal or boost without direct line of sight of her allies, a player's resourcefulness as Mercy can be largely independent of their teammates, particularly in cases where teammates can exemplify "bare minimum" game sense.

== Reception ==
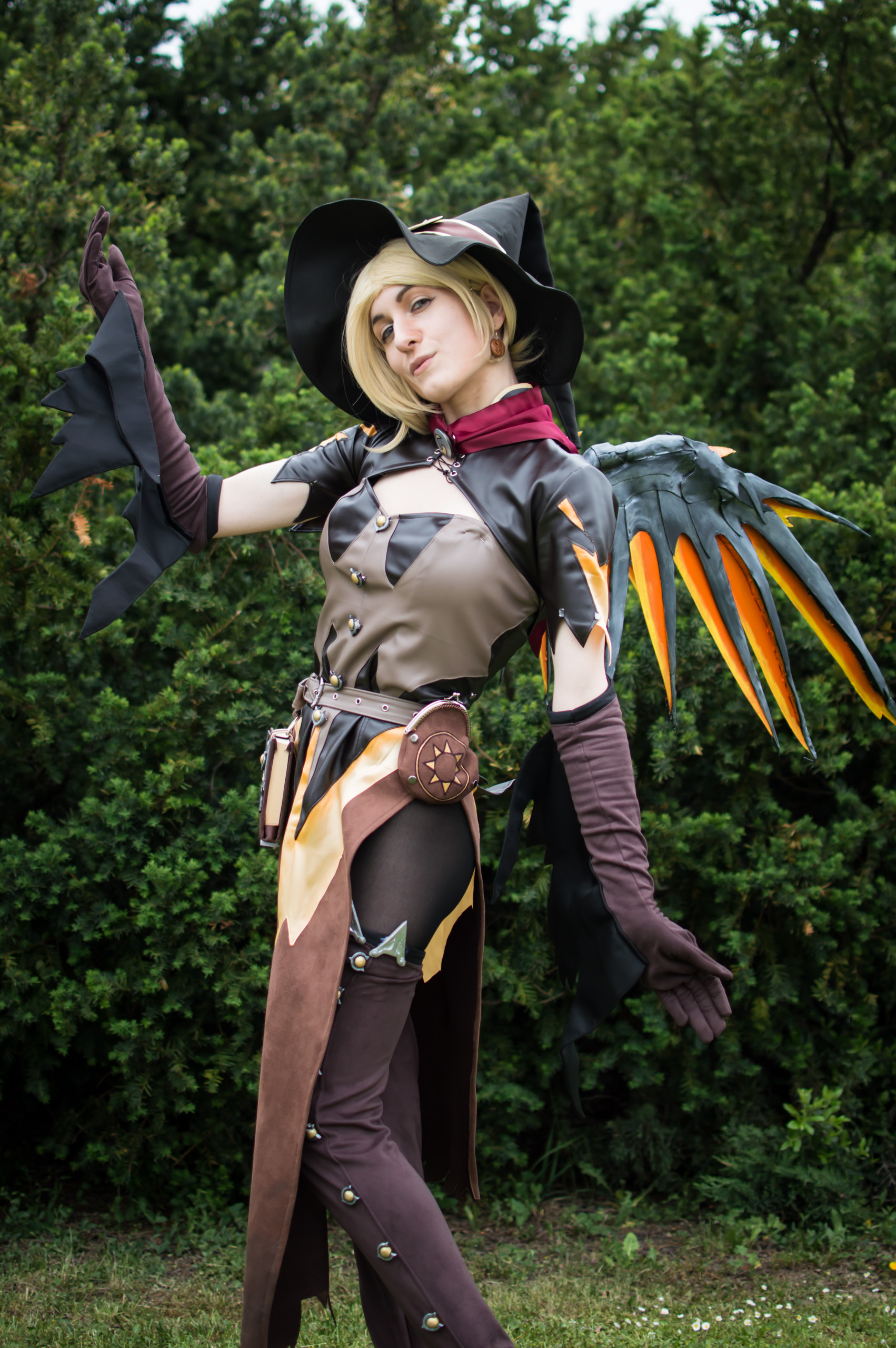
Cosplay of Mercy's alternate "Witch" skin

Often considered one of Overwatch's staple and most recognizable characters, as well as its most iconic support-class hero, (Note: Sources that cite Mercy as such or share similar sentiments include:) Mercy has received a somewhat mixed response from both video game media writers and Overwatch players. A popularly used character in Overwatch, Mercy is "celebrated by general Overwatch fandom". Her impact on gameplay, however, particularly in the game's esports community has attracted criticism.

During the game's open beta she was the most played support-class character. Following her major revamp in September 2017, Mercy was found to be universally picked as at least one healer on a team in competitive play, and because these changes require her to be closer to combat, the concept of a "Battle Mercy" who mixes both healing with attacks gained popularity at higher-ranked play. Some criticized this change, and felt it was a sign that Blizzard was trying to cater the game towards the competitive players over casual ones; high-level players felt that Mercy was a "zero aim" character prior to the September 2017 revamp, making it easy for new players to learn, but subsequently, the character requires more decision making and choices that can be difficult to casual players to learn.

A Eurogamer article referred to her as "gaming's greatest healer." In his review of Overwatch, Phil Savage of PC Gamer, expressed, "I particularly love how varied the movement is between characters," praising Mercy's glide ability and citing Mercy as "the perfect example of how every aspect of a character can, in the best cases, support a specific style." Savage elaborated, "alone, she's vulnerable and slow – easily ambushed and dispatched. But, with line-of-sight to a teammate, she can spread her wings and fly towards them. It's fun to do, and also reinforces the symbiotic partnership between healer and healed: Mercy needs her teammates as much as they need her. It's masterful design."

Despite being a popularly selected character, both media writers and players have noted success and enjoyment playing Mercy being largely dependent on the capabilities, attitudes, and competence of the player's teammates. Nathan Grayson of Kotaku called playing Mercy a "crapshoot" due to this. Mercy has also been cited as often present in discussions of player discontent with the game's balancing. Edwin Evans-Thirwell of PC Gamer wrote that Mercy was "patient zero" in the conflict of the original game's competing demands. Her impact on gameplay has garnered scorn from the Overwatch player base, both in the original game and its sequel, with some considering her damage boosting abilities toxic to game's balance. Tyler Colp of PC Gmmer wrote that "she is often the scapegoat for the shooter's balance issues, a healer who many players point to as the parasite leeching away Overwatch's competitive integrity."

Her Resurrect ability was considered "unfair" by some players, and due to it being able to cause such a considerable impact on the flow of a game, Kill Screen's Joshua Calixto referred to Mercy as "the most terrifying character in Overwatch." In professional play, such as the Overwatch League, some have argued that Mercy's Resurrect ability was still too much of a game-changer in these competitive matches; this concern persisted even after Mercy's September 2017 rework. Damian Alonzo for PC Gamer said that strategy for competitive Overwatch is generally about achieving a player advantage, which could be achieved with an early kill and which can snowball into greater advantages throughout the match, but Mercy's Resurrection completely undoes that advantage, nullifying such early kills and without any consequences. PCGamesN's Ben Barrett also said that because Mercy can undo the effects of short-term gain strategies like flanking with Resurrection, these strategies become futile, and resorting to more standard attack patterns slows down the pace of the game.

In the week of the game's launch, IGN noted Mercy as among a shortlist of characters "more popular than others when it comes to fan art." Her "Witch" skin for the game's Halloween-themed event was noted by Polygon to be extremely popular with Mercy players. A Mercy voice line used in a themed-event mode was not additionally paired with the Witch skin. Fans were able to successfully petition Blizzard to further include the voice line in-game with the skin equipped. In addition to fan art featuring the skin being made, some players changed their desktop background to the game's official menu screen featuring Mercy in the skin. Actress Amber Heard was reported to have spent two months designing her own Mercy cosplay for Elon Musk, after he told her she resembled the character, his favorite in Overwatch.

Mercy has also been cited as a commonly picked character in the healslut community, which engages in dominance and submission roleplay both in-game and through external means.

=== Fandom ===
Mercy is featured in two of the game's most prominent fandom "ships". A relationship between Mercy and Genji was hinted at in voice lines added in early 2017; fan reception to these voice lines was mixed, particularly among fans who engage in "shipping" characters from the game. Fans of the game created a couple name, Gency, for the duo's possible relationship. The relationship is one of the more popular fan-created ones, based on Genji's fictional biography, which includes Mercy saving his life and help rehabilitate him into a cyborg. Gita Jackson of Kotaku wrote that, "while some fans don't like the idea of the characters being canonically straight, there are other concerns that go beyond preference for a particular [relationship]. Some fans believe that 'shipping Mercy and Genji is inappropriate because Mercy is the Overwatch foundation's doctor. For them, the conflict of interest in a doctor/patient relationship is enough to make the ship feel inappropriate," adding that "some fans see the relationship as predatory on Mercy's part."

The shipping of Mercy and Pharah, often dubbed "PharMercy", has been noted as one of the most prolific Overwatch fan pairings. Kotaku has noted its particularly intense popularity within femslash circles. Players of the game often pair up as Pharah and Mercy, as the two character's gameplay abilities allow for the latter to follow the former while in-flight. Though unconfirmed as official references to the ship, Blizzard has included a rotating weekly game mode called "Death From Above" which limits players to choose only Pharah or Mercy, as well as voice lines between the two which have been considered flirtatious by some players and writers.
