= Genji (Overwatch) =

Fictional character in the Overwatch franchise

Genji Shimada
- Overwatch character
- Genji's's appearance in Overwatch
- First game: Overwatch (2016)
- Created by: Jeff Kaplan
- Designed by: Arnold Tsang
- Voiced by: Gaku Space

In-universe information
- Class: Damage
- Nationality: Japanese

Genji Shimada (/ɡɛndʒiː/) appears as a playable character in the first-person shooter video game Overwatch, developed in 2016 by Blizzard Entertainment. Genji also appears in Overwatch-related media, including animated shorts, as well as a playable character in the crossover multiplayer online battle arena game Heroes of the Storm.

As the brother to the playable character Hanzo, Genji was the youngest son of the Shimada ninja clan's master. In Genji's backstory, the brothers lived a life of luxury, but Genji's arrogance drove Hanzo to rage. Hanzo was ordered by the clan's elders to kill Genji, and he was believed to have succeeded. However, Genji clung to life, and Mercy, a doctor from the Overwatch organization, rebuilt his body. Within the Overwatch game, Genji was classified as an offense character with a hard difficulty rating. He is an advanced cyborg ninja, who uses his shuriken to attack, as well as his katana to deflect incoming projectiles, to swiftly strike through enemies, and to summon his Dragonblade ultimate.

== Conception and development ==
Genji and his brother Hanzo were originally one character.

While working on a massive multiplayer online game concept for Blizzard Entertainment, developer Geoff Goodman suggested the idea of a large number of character classes for players to select, but with class specialization for each. Fellow developer Jeff Kaplan took this idea to heart, salvaging character concepts from Titan—a then-recently cancelled Blizzard project—and character artwork by artist Arnold Tsang for that project. Kaplan created an eight-page pitch for a first person shooter concept to propose the idea which included a series of proposed characters, among them an armored female ninja character called "Assassin", armed with a bow and a katana, and able to parkour.

As development progressed, the design was modified to be a male cyborg ninja named Hanzo, with his weapon now just a bow. Further on, the concept was split into two separate sibling characters, with Hanzo retaining the bow and having a completely different design, while the newly-created Genji retained the armored ninja appearance and used a katana. According to lead writer Michael Chu, the split was necessary due to creating too much content for the original singular Hanzo concept, who was envisioned as a samurai-ninja hybrid. During development, Genji was referred to as "Sword Ninja" by the team, while Hanzo was called "Bow Ninja".

Chu stated that the relationship between the two brothers was inspired by a cooking documentary titled Jiro Dreams of Sushi, in which the older brother had to inherit the restaurant and carry on his father's legacy, while the younger brother had more free will. Genji is voiced by Gaku Space, with some of his lines in Japanese. Space helped ensure many of the lines sounded appropriate, as Chu acknowledged he himself was not fluent in Japanese.

=== Design ===
Genji stands 5 feet 7 inches (170 cm) tall.

Like other Overwatch characters, Genji received skins, unlockable cosmetic items to change his in-game appearance. While many were meant to reflect different aspects of Japanese ancestry, his "Bedouin" skin was meant to represent a time period in which he wandered the globe to come to terms with his mechanical body. As he was defined as an assassin, a word with Arabic origins, the development team paid homage to it by replacing his katana with a scimitar and incorporating Middle Eastern emblems into his design. Meanwhile, his "Young Genji" skin was designed to reflect its Hanzo counterpart, showing the character before becoming a cyborg to further flesh out the brothers' relationship. Attention was paid specifically to his hair, making it green to both contrast the younger-Hanzo's black and reflect his personality.

== Appearances ==
According to the Overwatch game's fictional biography, Genji Shimada is 37. He heirs from the Shimada family – a clan of assassins. As the youngest brother, Genji was arrogant and had very little interest in the illegal business of his family. Many members of the clan considered Genji dangerous and unfit for the clan, yet his father protected him and coddled him. Once his father died, Hanzo – Genji's brother – wanted Genji to change his playboy ways. Genji refused, enraging Hanzo. This tension escalated into a quarrel that left Hanzo thinking that he had killed his brother. Genji clung to life and was rescued by Dr. Angela Ziegler, an Overwatch agent. In exchange for agreeing to help the Overwatch organization put down the Shimada clan, Genji was crafted a cybernetic body and transformed into a living weapon. From then on, Genji's primary objective was to dismantle the Shimada empire.

Outside of Overwatch, Genji also appears in the dating sim game Loverwatch. Genji was also added as a playable character to the crossover MOBA game Heroes of the Storm in April 2017. His abilities within Heroes are nearly identical to his abilities within Overwatch – they involve Cyber Agility, Shuriken, Deflect, Swift Strike, and Dragonblade. The only major difference is an additional heroic ability, called "X-Strike", which was another planned ultimate ability for him in Overwatch. After activating this ability, he is able to unleash two slashes in a cross pattern. These slashes detonate after a short period of time, causing additional damage.

Genji made his first appearance in May 2016, within an animated short titled Dragons. He later appeared in Hanamura Showdown, a non-canon cinematic trailer for Heroes of the Storm 2.0. Genji also appeared in the animated short Zero Hour, which functioned as announcement cinematic for Overwatch 2.

=== Gameplay ===
Genji is classified as a damage character in Overwatch, wielding his technologically-advanced katana and his swift shuriken to take down enemies. He has 30 shurikens that he can wield before needing to reload. He can throw three of them in quick succession, or throw three at once in a wider spread. Moreover, with his Deflect ability, he can whip out his katana to deflect any and all incoming projectiles (including ultimate abilities), and send them back toward the opponent he's facing. His second ability Swift Strike causes Genji to dart forward, slashing his katana through all opponents standing in his way. If Genji manages to kill an enemy he can immediately use it without waiting for its cooldown. Genji's ultimate ability is Dragonblade, where Genji is free to deliver deathly blows to any targets within reach for a limited amount of time. Much like his brother, Genji has a passive ability called Wall Climb, which allows Genji to scale walls. He can also perform double jump.

== Promotion and reception ==
To promote Overwatch and the character, Genji was one of twelve heroes showcased in a playable build of the game at the 2014 BlizzCon convention, and later featured among a series of life-size boxed "action figures" to promote the game's release, with hiss showcased in Paris, France. Additional material included a cosplay guide and promotional images themed around holidays. At the end of 2016, Blizzard offered a special "Oni" character skin as a promotion for players who also played Heroes of the Storm. In 2026, cards and keychains featuring Genji were included in Chinese Burger King meals as part of a cross-promotion between the company and Loverwatch.

Michelle Ehrhardt in an article for Kill Screen described Genji as a "borderline superhero", praising his skills and abilities. However, she also reflected on his story and struggle with identity through the lens of her own gender transition, drawing parallels in how she and the characters changed and struggled with how others saw them. In this scope, she saw it as acceptance of parts of oneself they may otherwise be ashamed of, becoming more outgoing in forging new friendships and doing more to proactively try and help others based off one's own experiences.

Associate professor of the University of Tennessee Małgorzata Karolina Citko-DuPlantis in a paper for the Journal of the American Association of Teachers of Japanese emphasized that while defined as an "offense" character in Overwatch, Genji was not a one-dimensional character due to his crisis of identity and fragile nature illustrated in his frequent requests for healing. Drawing parallels to the Tale of Genji, she observed that while there were some similarities to the fictional work's titular character, Overwatch's Genji came across more as a medieval depiction of character than a classical one. In particular, she compared his relationship with Zenyatta to that of Minamoto no Yoshitsune and Benkei respectively, and felt it served as an example of how characters can evolve conceptually across reimaginings to not fit any one particular archetype.

She further suggested other aspects of the character appeared to not only take inspiration from other video game depictions of the classical Genji, but ninjas in general such as the character Raiden from Metal Gear Solid 2. Citko-DuPlantis stated that he was ultimately the result of "destabilization, reorganization, and thus remodernization" of concepts, and that his warrior identity may be part of a trend of Neo-medievalism, falling in with the stereotype of Japan as an advanced technological culture and an ideal of "Japaneseness" through the exoticized lens of how the rest of the world wants to see it. Despite this criticism, she saw Genji as an overall positive character for how well he was received, and felt he helped bring a new definition and awareness of the classical work to a modern audience.
