= Loverwatch =

2023 video game

- Developers: Blizzard Entertainment; Psyop
- Publisher: Blizzard Entertainment
- Series: Overwatch
- Platform: Web browser
- Release: February 13, 2023
- Genre: Dating sim
- Mode: Single-player

Loverwatch is a 2023 dating sim visual novel developed by Blizzard Entertainment and Psyop and published by Blizzard Entertainment. A parody of Blizzard's own Overwatch franchise, the game was released as a browser game.

== Gameplay ==
Presented in a visual novel format, the game features Hanzo in Cupid form helping guide players develop a relationship with Genji or Mercy. Players can choose if that relationship is platonic or romantic. The game features the player taking Genji or Mercy on dates, with settings including a comedy club and a dinner in Morocco.

== Development and release ==
Miranda Moyer and Kyungseo Min, narrative designers on Overwatch, served as Loverwatch's main narrative designers. The two are also part of Overwatch 2's development team, colloquially dubbed "Team Four". Min and Moyer were joined by Overwatch lead narrative designer Gavin Jurgens-Fyhrie, who kept Loverwatch's "tone and vision consistent". Moyer elaborated that Overwatch's narrative design team underwent expansion "over the past couple years" prior to Loverwatch's release, with each new designer asking about if developing a dating sim had been considered by the team. Min stated that the game "basically encapsulates the vibe of the narrative team Slack channel". The game was also partially developed by Psyop, which previously developed Hooked on You: A Dead by Daylight Dating Sim.

Featuring a short playtime of around 30 minutes, the game's narrative is not considered canon and heavily includes meta-humor. In an interview with Wired, Moyer noted that "an actual design philosophy that we went into this game with was making it open to as many people as possible". The game achieves this by being absent of "gendered dating tropes", and "instead leaning on the inherent awkwardness of early romantic relationships".

Genji and Mercy were decided as the two characters for the game, with Moyer and Min, respectively, writing their narrative paths. Min stated "there's a wealth of lore and also a wealth of community jokes and memes," while also attributing their selection for Loverwatch to their status as long-standing characters in the franchise's roster, as well as having "very different personalities". Moyer stated that it was important to "hit home on the kind of head-empty golden retriever energy" for Genji. Min focused on Mercy's personal lore, calling her "awkward", and stating "she was probably so busy getting two PhDs before the age of 18 that she probably didn't have much time to socialize. But she's still so sure of herself".

Loverwatch was announced in early February 2023, as part of a Valentine's Day-themed seasonal event for Overwatch 2. Blizzard made the game available as a web-based browser game through loverwatch.gg from February 13 to 28, 2023. The game was not available on mobile devices. Completing the game rewarded players with player icon cosmetics for Overwatch 2; Loverwatch tied-in further with Overwatch 2 by offering a highlight intro for players who unlocked a secret ending.

== Reception ==
The game received generally positive reviews from media writers, with many noting the game's self-referential humor. Serin Kaan of Rock Paper Shotgun and Will Nelson of PCGamesN both called the game "cringe", with the latter saying it was "delightfully" so. Kaan added that Loverwatch is "occasionally grating, but it's also surprisingly charming and stuffed with referential humour that OW fans will surely love". Jessica Cogswell of GameSpot wrote that "the dating sim is surprisingly delightful, packed with plenty of in-jokes".

Cass Marshall of Polygon, however, was critical of the game's short runtime, "breakneck" pace, and frequent in-jokes, calling the game "hesitant" and writing that its "perfectly cute premise" is "undercut by the fact that the narration is so meta-heavy". Marshall added, "it's a shame, because I would have loved a serious, straight-faced swing at the concept of an Overwatch dating sim. After so many years of asking for such a product, getting a silly, goofy response feels rough". Eric Ravenscraft also wrote that the game "leaves just a little bit too much on the cutting room floor".

Beth Bryson, Overwatch's marketing manager, stated the traffic for the game was "pretty strong" in its first 24 hours of availability.

== Future ==
The game includes teases at potential future and longer Overwatch dating sims. If the player inquires about why only Genji and Mercy are included as romantic pursuits in the game when prompted at the beginning, the game offers the text "we're not saying this is some kind of test version of a potentially more robust dating adventure. But we're not not saying that either". Bryson stated that if Loverwatch was received well by players, "absolutely the hope would be that we will be able to potentially expand this experience in the future".
