= Healslut =

Position in BDSM roleplay in video games

In video gaming and BDSM culture, a healslut (a combination of the words "heal" and "slut") is a player who selects a healer-class character to provide healing to another player as part of a dominant–submissive role-playing dynamic.

An online "healslutting" community has sprung up around the dynamic, in which players engage with one another both in-game and through external avenues.

== Definition and history of term ==
A healslut dynamic often consists of one player assuming the healer role, submitting to the player who has selected an offensive- or tank-class character. The term has been cited by Dictionary.com as being used as early as 2011, when it appeared in a tweet describing the Medic character in Team Fortress 2 as such. The term slut itself is regarded as an insult that may have a "gendered application" and is used "alongside other sexist language or content". As a result, the healslut term may be considered sexist. Assessing the healslut term, Ana Valens of The Daily Dot wrote that it is "empowering" in a sexual context, but "disparaging" in a gameplay one, adding "it implies two things: Either that a healer is a 'slut' who passively does nothing but heal, or the player is a healer who is a 'slut' for playing healer characters. The message is obvious: Healers are weak, passive participants in a game."

In 2015, the concept was discussed on 4chan boards about healing classes in video games such as World of Warcraft and League of Legends. The term was further popularized through the 2016 first-person hero shooter Overwatch. As Overwatch "reinvigorated" the healslut scene, the related subreddit largely consisted of "handmade Mercy tributes." Writing for Kotaku, Luke Winkie noted this phenomenon as adjacent to "the surprisingly large hamlet of people animating porn based on the game's characters." While Overwatch is a popularly used game for those engaging in the kink, other games have also cited as access points for healslutting. Among them include World of Warcraft, Monster Hunter: World, Final Fantasy XIV and League of Legends.

Winkie noted that the "breeziness" of the community is a core part of the scene. Valens noted that Winkie's article on Overwatch's healslut community was not well-received on Reddit, "as often happens with online communities built around niche interests." The moderator running the r/healsluts subreddit commented "I thought the article was terrible and did a horrible job portraying the healslut community, but in the end it was exposure. Can't bark too much when it was a net positive thing." Indeed, the related subreddit and Discord server both experienced considerable growth following the article's publication.

Though there exists a prevalent stereotype within the Overwatch player base that "all women play Mercy", both male- and female-identified players have been noted to engage in healslutting. Additionally, some transgender individuals have been noted to cite healslutting as helpful for their self-expression and gender affirmation. Healslutting has been noted as a small niche, as there exists a broader community of players who enjoy selecting healer-class characters for a variety of reasons, including those non-sexual.

=== Related roles and terminology ===
Aside from "healsluts", healer-class players may also conversely identify as "healdoms", in which they assume the dominant role in the dynamic as they can "control whether their partner lives or dies." In this dynamic, they may be paired with a "tankslut" that wants to "hurt and bleed for their partner." Furthermore, there is also a "DPSdom" (referring to "damage per second" or DPS players), that "habitually [flaunt] how good they are at killing opponents while reminding their submissive healslut 'just how useless they are' in winning the game." As with broader BDSM culture, some players also identify as "switches". In the r/healsluts subreddit, users will tag themselves with the roles they prefer to assume. Healsluts "often post in deferential, 'cute' language until a dom arrives in-thread to berate them, while 'switch' users aptly enough flow between discourse roles as they see fit."

== Methods of role-playing ==
Aside from in-game activity, "communal paratext surrounding the game involving forums, voice chat, and viral fan-designed images" also provide methods for engagement with the kink. Indeed, while some players attempt to find others willing to engage in the dynamic in-game, others will attempt to find players through Discord or the "r/healsluts" subreddit. Some players will refrain from in-game healslutting altogether. The use of sex toys and the creation of personal rules with play partners has also been noted.

Winkie described the process of healslut role-play in Overwatch as "simple", detailing "Equip the angelic healer Mercy with her Imp skin, spray-paint an arrow on the wall, and crouch beneath it. If you're lucky, a tank will walk up to you and emote "understood." You'll serve them dutifully and wait for the private message after the match." "Repurposed avatars and emotes" are often used when attempting to engage with the healslut kink; Overwatch players wishing to engage in healslut dynamics will, "through a mix of pre-designed animations known as 'emotes,' icons known as 'sprays' that can be placed on the gameplay environment, and voice lines, [...] 'announce' their intentions to other players aware of the code." This is done to circumvent running the risk of violating Blizzard Entertainment (Overwatch's developer)'s terms of service, which may result from directly announcing such healslutting intentions through the in-game voice chat.

== See also ==
- BDSM in culture and media
- Sexual content in video games
