= Healer (video games) =

Character class in video gaming

A healer is a type of character class in video gaming. When a game includes a health game mechanic and multiple classes, often one of the classes will be designed around the restoration of allies' health, known as healing, in order to delay or prevent their defeat. Such a class can be referred to as a healer. In addition to healing, healer classes are sometimes associated with buffs to assist allies in other ways, and nukes to contribute to the offense when healing is unnecessary.

When both healer and tank classes exist, a common grouping strategy is for the healer to focus healing on an allied tank, while the tank prevents other allies, including the healer, from losing health.

Healers are often represented as a fantasy spell-caster (such as a cleric, druid or shaman), a realistic combat specialist (such as a medic or paladin), a science-fiction technician (such as a repairman or engineer), or the like. Often, female gamers are associated with or stereotyped as always playing healer-class characters, with such characters being noted as often female as well.

== History ==
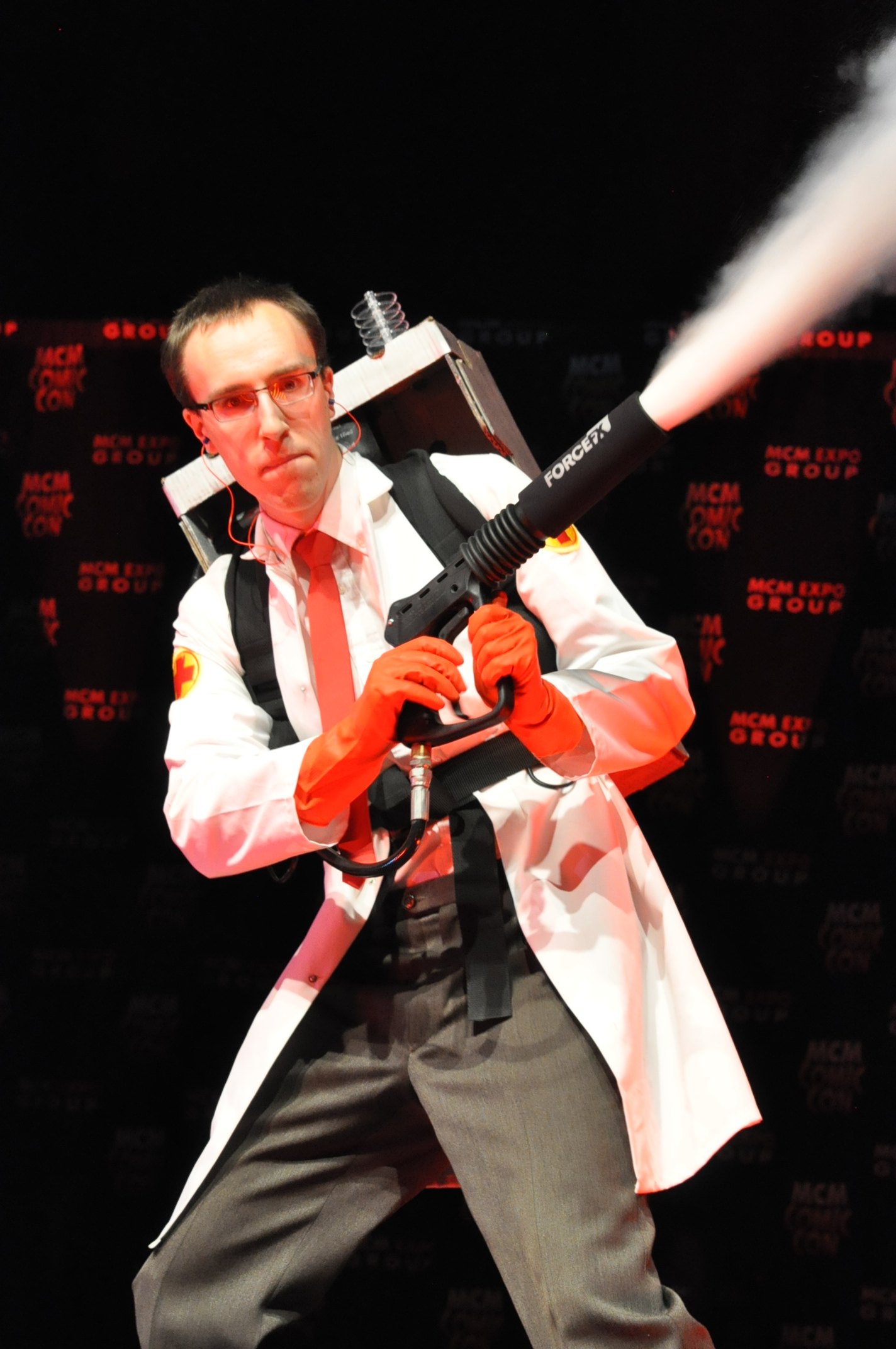
Cosplay of the Medic from Team Fortress 2, an example of a healer-class character

NetHack, a single-player roguelike video game, first released in 1987 includes a description of healers in its accompanying guidebook. It states:

Healers are wise in medicine and apothecary. They know the herbs and simples that can restore vitality, ease pain, anesthetize, and neutralize poisons; and with their instruments, they can divine a being's state of health or sickness. Their medical practice earns them quite reasonable amounts of money, with which they enter the dungeon.

Other early examples of video games with healers in them include Chrono Trigger (1995) and Final Fantasy VII (1997). The former includes the character Marle, who is portrayed as a water mage and performs healing functions. Final Fantasy VII featured the magic-based character Aerith Gainsborough, who was able to restore chunks of health to the player's party. She would go on to become one of the more iconic healing characters in gaming. Unreal Tournament (1999) included healing in multiplayer gameplay. Healers were a markedly important facet of gameplay in the 2004 massively multiplayer online role-playing game (MMORPG) World of Warcraft. America's Army: Rise of a Soldier (2005) rewarded players for healing teammates.

Healers are often incorporated within the broader Support-class subset of characters in a game's playable roster. As such, healers and support characters are commonly associated with each other. Valve's Team Fortress 2 (2007), a first-person shooter (FPS) incorporated healers into gameplay. The game featured three support characters in general, with one, the Medic, being dedicated to solely healing. Team Fortress 2 featured competitive multiplayer, in which healer characters have been noted as vital in gameplay. In such competitive multiplayer, healer-class players have been noted as an underappreciated. Massively multiplayer online role-playing games (or MMORPGs) have been noted by PC Gamer to have a "usual problem of there being too few healers or tanks because most people want to be able to level and solo efficiently." Some players have been documented to prefer selecting healer-class characters in competitive multiplayer modes, who have cited a desire to help teammates and a relative accessibility as reasons why. Edwin Evans-Thirlwell of The Face wrote that "healer roles [in shooter games] stand out because they don't depend on hand-eye coordination, making them attractive both to players who find 'twitch-shooting' a turn-off and people with disabilities that affect their accuracy and reflexes." In the 2010s, a community sprung up around the concept of "healslutting", which sees some players submit to others while role-playing a healer character.

== Roles and abilities ==
Multiplayer games featuring healing are not limited by genre, as the class is present in a variety of genres including role-playing games (RPG), first-person shooters (FPS), and multiplayer online battle arenas (MOBA).

A healer is generally tasked with restoring health, removing poison-like effects, and reviving fallen party members. Different games may include different mechanics, such as the ability to deal damage or to enhance the attributes of their allies. Healers require a degree of situational awareness, as well as resource management in regards to their kit. In shooters, healing abilities, such as throwable health packs typically aim themselves. However, there are examples of healer characters that do require shooting finesse, such as Ana of Overwatch, who is equipped with a hypodermic rifle.

In parties that include both a tank and a healer, it is customary for the latter to heal any damage taken by the former. In small groups, they may also be tasked to heal the group as well, but in large scale group-play there are typically specific healers assigned to party-wide damage (typically taken indirectly, via lesser minions, spells or environment/habitat of the boss).

== Specifications ==
=== Targeting specifics ===
Healers fall into two major categories when it comes to targeting options: Single-Target and Multi-Target.

Single-Target healers often have much more potent spells than their Multi-Targeting counterparts, such as those that fully restore a target's Health or resurrect an ally that had previously lost all their Health.

Multi-Target healers tend to lack potency, but heal multiple allies (often the entire Party) with abilities. In Tactical RPGs or open-world games, their spells may utilize an Area of Effect (AoE) mechanic. Healers that fall into this sub-type often do not possess resurrection spells.

Healers often do not utilise only one targeting system. Targeting options tend to depend on the skill rather than the character.

=== Sub-jobs ===
Healers have a small number of roles that they can be delegated towards. Often, a healer will fill one or more of these roles. Alternatively, a healer may fill one of these roles in addition to some other job, such as damage dealing (Battle Cleric, Druid), inflicting negative statuses on enemies (Witch/Warlock), or even drawing in damage (Paladin).

- Restoration: Restoring Health to allies. This tends to be the job most associated with healer classes.
- Curation: Removing harmful or otherwise negative statuses from allies.
- Support: Used in the context of healers, this typically refers to applying regenerative buffs or shields to allies.
- Resurrection: The rarest healer archetype, focused on not preventing death, but overcoming it.
  - Necromancers are a blurry line against the grain of Resurrection healers. They're often more classified as a summoner, summoning skeleton or zombie themed minions to deal damage or draw enemy attacks.

== See also ==
- Tank (video games), a common character class focused on drawing enemy damage.
