= Overwatch seasonal events =

Seasonal events run by Blizzard for the 2016 video game Overwatch

Overwatch and Overwatch 2 (later rebranded as just Overwatch in February 2026) are online team-based first-person shooters developed by Blizzard Entertainment, and released worldwide in May 2016 and October 2022, respectively. Players select from one of over 50 heroes, broadly classified into the three roles of Tank, Damage, and Support, and work with their team to attack or defend map objectives. Each hero has a unique set of weapons, abilities, and skills, which players use to coordinate with their team to overpower the other. Overwatch supports both casual and ranked matchmaking, as well as a rotating set of arcade modes, and the game has since become a popular esport, featuring the Overwatch League that started in 2018. The game has been both a critical and financial success for Blizzard, exceeding over 30 million players and obtaining over US$1 billion in revenue within its first year.

To support ongoing interest in the game, Blizzard has run several seasonal events, typically coinciding with worldwide events and holidays. These events last for two to three weeks, updating levels to incorporate elements of that theme, and provide new game modes along with the opportunity to buy items with credits or acquire them through the game's loot box system. Players keep their earned character cosmetic options after the event ends, but the rest of the themed elements return to normal.

== Overview ==
Over the course of developing Overwatch, Blizzard opted against using a downloadable content model to extend the game and bring post-sale revenues, as they had developed the game around the mechanic of allowing players to switch out to new heroes during the course of a match as to meet current strategic conditions; by requiring players to purchase new heroes, such a model would have hampered this approach. Instead, they opted to include microtransactions through which players can buy loot boxes, which contain four randomized cosmetic items, including characters skins, victory poses, emotes, spray tags, highlight introductions, and player icons. This allowed them to create an incentivized level progression system that would reward players with a loot box for every level they earned from experience gained in playing matches. Working alongside this, players can earn in-game coins through some loot box rewards or as a consolation prize for receiving a duplicate loot box reward. These coins can be used to purchase any of the available cosmetic items (except for player icons), the cost reflecting the rarity of obtaining the item through a loot box.

Beginning in August 2016, Blizzard began introducing seasonal events, starting with the Summer Games event which corresponded with the 2016 Summer Olympics. Overwatch's director Jeff Kaplan said the goal of these seasonal events was to make the game "feel alive", correlating with real-world events. The company has a history of creating in-game seasonal events, such as the Valentine's Day and New Year's events in World of Warcraft. Other competitor games, such as Destiny, League of Legends and Team Fortress 2, also implement in-game seasonal events.

Events have generally included at least one new game mode, which typically is only available to play while that event is active; one exception is the "Capture the Flag" mode introduced during the Lunar New Year event in early 2017, which has been brought back to the game as a permanent feature in the game's casual Arcade matchmaking mode. Players are typically rewarded with loot boxes for playing matches in these seasonal game modes, and the game offers unique achievements and associated cosmetic rewards for completing certain goals within them.

In addition to new game modes, these seasonal events include unique cosmetic items that can be obtained primarily during the event. Blizzard develops a large amount of content for these events, not all of which ends up available to players. Initially, these items could only be obtained through event-themed loot boxes that are guaranteed to contain at least one event-themed item, which could either be earned through leveling up, completing the event game modes, or through microtransactions; however, in response to player feedback and avoid an apparent paywall access to these items, Blizzard allowed players to purchase these items with in-game currency at a higher cost than a non-event item of the same rarity, starting from the second seasonal event onward. When the event is completed, the themed loot boxes and cosmetic items are no longer are available until the event is run again. However, players retain and can use all unique event items they have earned after the event. Not all event items will be limited in this manner, as Blizzard plans to have certain event items be possible loot obtained from a regular loot box in the future.

Several seasonal events, such as Summer Games, Halloween Terror, and Winter Wonderland, have recurred. However, on bringing these events back, the development team has added new changes to the event to keep them fresh and to reflect any new heroes or other content added to the game since the previous event's occurrence; for example, the 2017 Halloween "Junkenstein's Revenge" included a new endless mode and support for some of the newer heroes. Recurring events also feature new themed cosmetic items for these recurring events, along with the return of the previous cosmetics which can be found in the event loot boxes or bought for a reduced coin amount. Not all seasonal events are designed for recurrence, such as the lore-heavy "Uprising" event which took place in April 2017. Kaplan said that Blizzard has plans as to how these events will evolve in the future.

Blizzard has also made single day changes to the game for April Fool's Day, which has included giving all characters googly eyes, though no other event rewards are associated with the day.

The sequel Overwatch 2 was released in October 2022, and will continue the seasonal events. According to Kaplan, while the game will be a sequel, they want to allow all content from the first Overwatch to be brought forward into Overwatch 2, requiring them to slow down new content development for the original game, particularly new heroes and maps. Kaplan saw the seasonal events as a means to still provide some type of fresh content to Overwatch players during this interim.

== Event types ==
=== Lunar New Year ===
To correlate to the real-world Lunar New Year, the Overwatch event is held around the same time (typically from late January to early February), and named following the Chinese Zodiac; for example, the first such event occurring in 2017 was named the "Year of the Rooster". Cosmetics in these events have followed the themes from Asian legends. The event introduced the first Capture the Flag mode for Overwatch called "Capture the Rooster"; Blizzard had looked at adding such a mode for a few years during Overwatch's development but had difficulty with the mechanics due to the vastly different set of abilities offered by the characters that could imbalance the mode towards fast-moving characters. Played on the Lijiang Tower map, normally used for Control modes, each team has a flag near their base. To capture the other opponent's flag, a character must stay near the flag and not take damage for a few seconds. Once they have taken the flag, they then must return it to their team's base, scoring a point if they do so. If they die while bringing the flag back, either a teammate can try to capture it, or the opposing team must stay near the flag, avoiding taking damage for a few seconds, to return it to their base. Teams can score with the opposing team's flag even if their team's flag has been taken. The first team to three scores, or the team with the highest score after five minutes, wins the match. Following the event, Blizzard introduced a more general Capture the Flag mode, playable on any of the Control maps, into the Arcade modes as well as making it an option for custom games with several adjustable parameters.

A second new mode, Bounty Hunter Brawl, was added in the 2021 Lunar New Year. This mode is similar to the deathmatch mode, except that players earn more points by eliminating the current player that is marked as the target; the player landing the final blow becomes the new target, whose location is visible to all, but they also gain full health and obtain a full Ultimate skill meter. After the event, the Bounty Hunter Brawl was also added as a mode to the Arcade gameplay. The Bounty Hunter Brawl mode was developed by Blizzard while toying around with a free-for-all approach to the Capture the Flag mode and eliminating the flag objective while still tracking one target player.

=== Overwatch Archives ===
The Overwatch Archive events were typically held in April each year, and featured story-driven cooperative player versus environment Archive modes that Blizzard has used to explore the history of the characters and narrative. According to Kaplan, the Archive modes were something Blizzard felt had been asked for by players since they started offering the seasonal events. Players had requested non-holiday-themed events, as well as sought more details on the setting and history of the Overwatch world. Also, these events add additional cosmetic items based on the uniforms and backstory of the original Overwatch forces. A series of digital comics tied to the narrative of the mode were released alongside the event.

In the normal Archive events, players select from four pre-selected characters, and then fight as directed by in-game narration to attack or defend points from enemy forces. If a player was downed, any of the other still-surviving players could help them up by interacting with that character for a few moments. If all four players are downed, or the explosive is destroyed before reaching the sealed doors, the round ends as a loss. A separate mode allowed players to complete the same mission without being limited in character selection, but without any of the character-specific dialogue; Blizzard added this based on feedback from Junkenstein's Revenge, to provide a less restrictive way to enjoy the game mode. For the first three years of the Archives event, Blizzard added a new mission, while in the fourth year, they added special variants of these missions that altered the conditions of the match, such as where each heroes' health is halved but they deal twice as much damage.

The Archive mode was considered a much-improved version of a player-versus-environment mode compared to Junkenstein's Revenge from the Halloween event. Cecilia D'Anastasio for Kotaku felt the mode was much more dynamic since it required players to move throughout the map rather than stay in one general location, and as the four default characters represent a balanced team, the mode calls for more careful teamwork and strategy. D'Anastasio also felt that with new voice lines to support this mode, it helped to establish the game's lore for players. PC Gamer argued that the Uprising event demonstrated the potential for a strong team-based story-driven campaign developed within the Overwatch narrative. Elements of these Archive missions were used as the basis to develop the cooperative side of the upcoming Overwatch 2.

=== Anniversary ===
Corresponding to the game's release in May of each year, the Anniversary event features several new cosmetics for many characters. It also makes all special cosmetics that are normally locked except during the special events available for purchase with in-game coins and possible to obtain through loot boxes. Nearly all special game modes from all events are made playable as well. The Anniversary mode has been used to introduce major new features to the game following testing on the Public Test Region. The first Anniversary event added three new Arena maps used for the smaller-scale Elimination games, and which remained in rotation after the events' conclusion, as well as adding new Elimination game modes. "The Workshop", a script-based system for users to create their own games, launched alongside the 3rd Anniversary event, with several of the more successful user game modes brought into the Arcade for all to play.

=== Summer Games ===
Overwatch's "Summer Games" event was first run concurrent to the 2016 Summer Olympics and since ran annually. The events are generally themed around summer sports and activities. During this event, a special game mode called Lúcioball is available. Lúcioball was designed as a futuristic soccer game in which two teams of three Lúcio characters attempt to push a ball into their opponents' goal. Played in four-minute matches on the special stadium map, Estádio das Rãs, players use two kinds of attacks to control the ball's movements: primarily, a melee attack and a secondary, powerful sonic boom that could knock back opponents as well (frequently called "booping" by players). Players can also use the level's environmental perks (e.g., jump pads and speed-boosting walls) to secure a strategic advantage on the field. PC Gamer felt that the mode felt closer to a "multiplayer carnival game than a fleshed-out, standalone mode".

=== Halloween Terror ===
The Halloween Terror events fall around the end of October to celebrate Halloween. Most new cosmetics added are based on classic monster and horror tropes. It first offered the "Junkenstein's Revenge" cooperative game mode against computer players is available. In Junkenstein's Revenge, four players cooperatively guard a castle door against oncoming waves of enemies and bosses. Set in a themed section of the game's Eichenwalde map, players select a difficulty level and choose between the characters Ana, Hanzo, McCree, and Soldier: 76, before fighting off approaching mindless "zomnic" drones, long-range "zombardiers," exploding tires, and costumed versions of the characters Reaper, Roadhog, Symmetra, Mercy, and Junkrat (as the titular Dr. Junkenstein). The game mode includes new voice work and is based on a companion comic book released concurrently. Later iterations have added other heroes that can be selected, as well as a secondary mode where any hero can be selected.

The new mode was generally praised by commentators. PC Gamer wrote that the event resembled a similar event run on the team shooter Team Fortress 2 since 2012. Though the reviewer found the Junkenstein mode pleasant, he wrote that in comparison to Team Fortress 2's Mann vs. Machine mode, Junkenstein felt "shallow" and similar to Lúcioball in its simplistic map flow, giving little room for player movement. He also wondered why the mode was limited to four specific characters. Eurogamer's Robert Purchase found the event fun and considered it a good distraction from Overwatch's main modes, but also recognized that if it was kept on after the Halloween Terror event, it would become a stale game mode. Heather Alexandra for Kotaku felt that the mode demonstrated that a co-operative player-versus-environment mode would fit well as a permanent feature within Overwatch as it required good team coordination to complete more challenging matches.

With 2024, another Halloween themed mode was added, "Junkenstein's Laboratory". It is played on the round-based Control maps with a limited set of heroes, but otherwise as a 5v5 game mode. At the start of each game, and between rounds, players can select a mutation from four randomly offered that buffs their chosen character, with stronger buffs offered in later rounds. The mode was favorably compared to the roguelike genre and thee scraped plans for Overwatch 2's PvE mode. This mode also became popular to the extent that during its 2024 run, Blizzard extended its availability by a week and issued a balance tuning patch mid-event in response to player feedback.

=== Winter Wonderland ===
The Winter Wonderland events typically run late in the calendar year into the new year timed with winter in the Northern Hemisphere. Its cosmetics tend to feature both winter-themed cosmetics as well as those related to Christmas and other similar holiday events.

Two event modes have been added during Winter Wonderland. The first is a deathmatch mode called "Mei's Snowball Offensive". The mode takes place on the smaller Ecopoint: Antarctica map, introduced in the previous months for standard deathmatch play. Six players each play Mei, but where her Endothermic Blaster, which normally fires a stream of damaging cold, can only fire a single snowball. Players must find a snowball pile scattered around the map to reload the weapon. Further, her Ultimate ability allows her to fire a machine-gun-like string of snowballs for a brief period. Otherwise, Mei's other abilities (Ice Wall and Cyro-Freeze) remain the same. A single snowball hit kills the struck until the round is complete. Kotaku claims this mode was generally not well received by players as the act of having to reload the Blaster made one too vulnerable, and with the permadeath mechanic in play, the mode was not fun nor captured the spirit of a snowball fight.

The second new mode is "Yeti Hunter", an asymmetric mode where five players, each playing as Mei, attempt to defeat one player controlling Winston (acting as the Yeti) in a boss battle on Nepal's Village stage. Yeti Hunt is the first Overwatch mode to use role selection; players can indicate their preference to play as a Mei or as the Yeti. The Winston player must elude the Mei team, which can freeze him, use ice walls to impede his movement, or catch him in a snare trap (which replaces Mei's usual Ultimate). After collecting four pieces of meat, which spawn randomly in predetermined locations around the map, Winston unleashes his Ultimate ability for a short period which temporarily boosts his health, reduces his jump cooldown, and gives him powerful melee attacks. When a Mei player dies, they will respawn after a short delay and cost their team a life. The match is over once the Mei team either defeats Winston or loses all five of their lives. Kaplan described the Yeti Hunt as a light-hearted mode to be played for a few matches rather than hundreds of hours.

=== April Fools' Day ===
Since 2020, Blizzard has added amusing content to Overwatch near April Fools' Day (April 1). Initially these were mostly cosmetic, such as adding googly eyes to all the characters. From 2021, Blizzard included a limited time mode introducing buffs and other alterations to character abilities such as greatly increasing damage or changing character sizes without heeding game balance.

=== Special challenges ===
Character-specific challenges are not run on a regular schedule but generally are released alongside new narrative pieces of lore for that character. They feature new cosmetic items that a player can earn either through playing and winning matches in-game and/or through watching Overwatch players on streaming media during the set period.

=== Quick-play Hacked ===
Offered during limited times since January 2024, a special Quick-play mode has been added to the game for limited time. Under the auspices that Sombra has hacked the game, these modes change the rules of the game, which Blizzard uses in part to test new gameplay ideas. For example, the first Hacked event sped up the game by reducing respawn and capture timers.

=== Competitive Drives ===
Blizzard introduced Drives in Season 12. Lasting for a single weekend at the end of a season, players have the opportunity to earn competitive points and a special name marker by playing in competitive modes. Wins grant points, while losses cost about half the points one would have gained from a win. Rewards are earned on reaching certain scoring levels, and players cannot loss points to fall below these checkpoints.

== Event history ==
| Event name | Start date | End date | Notes | Ref. |
|---|---|---|---|---|
Overwatch events
| Summer Games 2016 | August 2, 2016 | August 22, 2016 | Introduced Lúcioball | |
| Halloween Terror 2016 | October 11, 2016 | November 1, 2016 | Introduced Junkenstein's Revenge | |
| Winter Wonderland 2016 | December 13, 2016 | January 2, 2017 | Introduced Mei's Snowball Offensive | |
| Year of the Rooster | January 24, 2017 | February 13, 2017 | Introduced Capture the Flag | |
| Overwatch Archive: Uprising | April 11, 2017 | May 1, 2017 | Introduced the "Uprising" Archive mission | |
| Anniversary 2017 | May 23, 2017 | June 12, 2017 | Introduced new Arena maps and two Elimination modes | |
| Summer Games 2017 | August 8, 2017 | August 29, 2017 | Added additional maps for Lúcioball and introduced ranked play for Lúcioball (Copa Lúcioball) | |
| Halloween Terror 2017 | October 10, 2017 | November 2, 2017 | Added four characters for scored Junkenstein's Revenge and online scoreboards | |
| Winter Wonderland 2017 | December 12, 2017 | January 1, 2018 | Introduced Yeti Hunter | |
| Year of the Dog | February 8, 2018 | March 5, 2018 | Modified Capture the Flag rules, and introduced ranked play for Capture the Flag. | |
| Overwatch Archive: Retribution | April 10, 2018 | May 3, 2018 | Introduced the "Retribution" Archive mission | |
| Anniversary 2018 | May 22, 2018 | June 11, 2018 | Introduced ranked play for deathmatch | |
| Summer Games 2018 | August 9, 2018 | August 30, 2018 | Added new map for Lúcioball | |
| D.Va's Nano Cola Challenge | August 28, 2018 | September 10, 2018 | First Character-Based Challenge | |
| Halloween Terror 2018 | October 10, 2018 | October 31, 2018 | Added two characters for scored Junkenstein's Revenge | |
| Winter Wonderland 2018 | December 11, 2018 | January 2, 2019 | | |
| Ana's Bastet Challenge | January 8, 2019 | February 21, 2019 | | |
| Year of the Pig | January 24, 2019 | February 18, 2019 | | |
| Overwatch Archive: Storm Rising | April 16, 2019 | May 6, 2019 | Introduced the "Storm Rising" Archive mission | |
| Anniversary 2019 | May 21, 2019 | June 10, 2019 | Introduced "The Workshop" to the game | |
| Baptiste's Reunion Challenge | June 19, 2019 | July 1, 2019 | | |
| Summer Games 2019 | July 16, 2019 | August 5, 2019 | | |
| Bastion's Brick Challenge | August 17, 2019 | August 30, 2019 | Collaboration with The Lego Group | |
| Halloween Terror 2019 | October 15, 2019 | November 4, 2019 | | |
| Mercy's Recall Challenge | November 12, 2019 | December 2, 2019 | | |
| Winter Wonderland 2019 | December 10, 2019 | January 2, 2020 | | |
| Year of the Rat | January 17, 2020 | February 6, 2020 | Introduced CTF Blitz | |
| Ashe's Mardi Gras Challenge | February 25, 2020 | March 9, 2020 | | |
| Overwatch Archives | March 12, 2020 | April 2, 2020 | Added variants to the past Archive missions. | |
| Anniversary 2020 | May 19, 2020 | June 9, 2020 | | |
| Sigma's Maestro Challenge | July 14, 2020 | July 27, 2020 | Introduced alongside the release of Overwatch: Cities & Countries, a music playlist available on several digital and music streaming services. | |
| Summer Games 2020 | August 4, 2020 | August 26, 2020 | | |
| Tracer's Comic Challenge | September 15, 2020 | September 28, 2020 | | |
| Halloween Terror 2020 | October 13, 2020 | November 3, 2020 | | |
| Symmetra's Restoration Challenge | November 17, 2020 | November 30, 2020 | | |
| Winter Wonderland 2020 | December 15, 2020 | January 5, 2021 | | |
| Hanzo's Kanezaka Challenge | January 12, 2021 | January 25, 2021 | Introduced the new deathmatch map Kanezaka. | |
| Year of the Ox | February 4, 2021 | February 25, 2021 | Introduced Bounty Hunter Brawl, which was added to the arcade rotation after the event. | |
| Roadhog's PachiMarchi Challenge | March 9, 2021 | March 22, 2021 | | |
| Overwatch Archives | April 6, 2021 | April 27, 2021 | Introduced new reward system, with players earning stars from Archives missions to unlock cosmetics, with more stars earned from more difficult missions and successful completions. | |
| Anniversary 2021 | May 18, 2021 | June 8, 2021 | Concurrent with new cosmetics for Heroes of the Storm to give existing characters in that game Overwatch-style appearances | |
| Ashe's Deadlock Challenge | June 22, 2021 | July 5, 2021 | Coincided with cross-platform play support updates. | |
| Summer Games 2021 | July 20, 2021 | August 10, 2021 | | |
| Halloween Terror 2021 | October 12, 2021 | November 2, 2021 | | |
| Cassidy's New Blood Challenge | November 9, 2021 | November 23, 2021 | Event occurred in the month after McCree had been renamed Cassidy due to events of ongoing workplace litigation at Activision Blizzard | |
| Winter Wonderland 2021 | December 16, 2021 | January 6, 2022 | | |
| Year of the Tiger | January 25, 2022 | February 15, 2022 | | |
| Reaper's Code of Violence | February 22, 2022 | March 8, 2022 | | |
| Anniversary Remix Vol. 1 | April 5, 2022 | April 25, 2022 | Included palette swapped "remixes" of older legendary skins | |
| Anniversary Remix Vol. 2 | May 17, 2022 | June 7, 2022 | Included palette swapped "remixes" of older legendary skins | |
| Anniversary Remix Vol. 3 | August 8, 2022 | August 30, 2022 | Final Overwatch seasonal event. Loot boxes were no longer available to be purchase at end of event as Blizzard prepared to transition to Overwatch 2. Included palette swapped "remixes" of older legendary skins. | |
Overwatch 2 seasons and events
| Season 1 | October 4, 2022 | December 6, 2022 | Introduced Sojourn, Junker Queen, and Kiriko as new playable heroes. Added new Push gamemode and maps, and two new Hybrid maps. | |
| Halloween Terror 2022 | October 25, 2022 | November 8, 2022 | First Overwatch 2 seasonal event. Introduced new version of Junkenstein's Revenge, called "Junkenstein's Revenge: Wrath of the Bride". | |
| Season 2 | December 6, 2022 | February 7, 2023 | Introduced Ramattra as a new playable hero. | |
| Winter Wonderland 2022 | December 13, 2022 | January 3, 2023 | | |
| Battle for Olympus | January 5, 2023 | January 19, 2023 | Introduced special deathmatch mode with cosmetics based on Olympian mythology | |
| Season 3 | February 7, 2023 | April 11, 2023 | | |
| Loverwatch | February 13, 2023 | February 28, 2023 | Introduced browser-based dating sim game, and a in-game 4 vs. 4 match based on Hanzo. | |
| One-Punch Man Crossover | March 7, 2023 | April 6, 2023 | First crossover event within Overwatch, featuring new cosmetics based on characters from One-Punch Man, such as a Saitama-based outfit for Doomfist. | |
| Season 4 | April 11, 2023 | June 13, 2023 | Introduced Lifeweaver as a new playable hero | |
| Season 5 | June 13, 2023 | August 10, 2023 | | |
| Season 6: Invasion | August 10, 2023 | October 10, 2023 | First seasons to carry a theme. Introduced Illari as a playable hero. Introduced Flashpoint as a game mode. Introduced Hero Mastery courses and Story Missions. | |
| Season 7: Rise of Darkness | October 10, 2023 | December 5, 2023 | Collaboration with Diablo franchise. | |
| Le Sserafim x Overwatch 2 | November 1, 2023 | November 23, 2023 | Collaboration with South Korean girl group Le Sserafim. Introduced a limited-time 3 vs. 3 game mode called "Concert Clash", as well as new Le Sserafim-themed cosmetics. | |
| Season 8: Call of the Hunt | December 5, 2023 | February 13, 2024 | Introduced Mauga as a playable hero | |
| Season 9: Champions | February 13, 2024 | April 16, 2024 | | |
| Cowboy Bebop x Overwatch 2 | March 12, 2024 | March 25, 2024 | Introduced cosmetic skins based on Cowboy Bebop characters. | |
| Season 10: Venture Forth | April 16, 2024 | June 20, 2024 | Introduced Venture as a playable hero. | |
| Season 11: Super Mega Ultrawatch | June 20, 2024 | August 19, 2024 | | |
| Transformers x Overwatch 2 | July 9, 2024 | TBD | Introduced cosmetic skins based on Transformer characters | |
| Season 12: New Frontiers | August 20, 2024 | October 15, 2024 | Ancient Egyptian themed. Introduced Juno as a playable hero. Reintroduced Clash as a play mode after previous testing in Season 10. | |
| World of Warcraft x Overwatch 2 | September 17, 2024 | September 30, 2024 | Crossover skins from World of Warcraft. | |
| Anniversary 2024 | September 24, 2024 | October 14, 2024 | | |
| Season 13: Spellbinder | October 15, 2024 | December 9, 2024 | Spellcraft themed. | |
| Halloween Terror 2024 | October 15, 2024 | November 4, 2024 | Introduced new Deathmatch variant, Junkerstein's Laboratory, along with existing themed modes. | |
| My Hero Academia x Overwatch 2 | October 17, 2024 | October 30, 2024 | Crossover skins from the anime My Hero Academia | |
| Overwatch Classic | November 12, 2024 | December 3, 2024 | Game modes based on the original Overwatch, including 6 v 6 gameplay and original character abilities. | |
| Season 14: Hazard | December 10, 2024 | February 17, 2025 | Introduced new hero Hazard. | |
| Avatar: The Last Airbender x Overwatch 2 | December 17, 2024 | December 30, 2024 | Crossover skins with Avatar: the Last Airbender | |
| Season 15: Honor and Glory | February 18, 2025 | April 2025 | Introduces perks gameplay feature, reintroduce loot boxes | |
| Le Sserafim Homecoming | March 18, 2025 | April 1, 2025 | Second crossover with Le Sserafim featuring new cosmetics. | |
| Season 16 | April 22, 2025 | June 23, 2025 | Introduces new hero Freya. Introduces new game mode Stadium. Adds hero bans to competitive mode. | |
| Gundam Wing x Overwatch 2 | April 29, 2025 | May 12, 2025 | Crossover skins based on Gundam Wing | |
| Street Fighter 6 x Overwatch 2 | May 20, 2025 | June 2, 2025 | Crossover skins based on Street Fighter 6 | |
| Season 17: Powered Up! | June 24, 2025 | August 25, 2025 | Introduces map voting for competitive mode. Expands Stadium mode with loadout testing, new maps, and new available heroes. | |
| G.I. Joe x Overwatch 2 | July 1, 2025 | July 14, 2025 | Crossover skins with the G.I. Joe franchise. | |
| Season 18: Stadium Quickplay | August 26, 2025 | October 13, 2025 | Introduces Wuyang as the 44th hero. Adds unranked Stadium mode along with news maps and heroes available for Stadium. | |
| Persona 5 x Overwatch 2 | September 16, 2025 | September 30, 2025 | Crossover skins with Persona 5. | |
| Season 19: Haunted Masquerade | October 14, 2025 | December 9, 2025 | Halloween themed season. Introduced new limited mode, "Haunted Masquerade", allowing players to equip masks of the other characters and gain some of those character's abilities. | |
| Season 20: Vendetta | December 9, 2025 | February 10, 2026 | Introduces Vendetta as the 45th hero. | |
| Winter Wonderland 2025 | December 9, 2025 | January 7, 2026 | December festive themed event with a winter themed "Mischief & Magic" game mode. | |
Post-February 2026 Overwatch seasons and events
Rise of Talon
| Season 1: Conquest | February 10, 2026 | April 13, 2026 | First season under the Overwatch rebrand and annual story-driven season cycle. Introduces Domina, Anran, Emre, Mizuki, and Jetpack Cat as the 46th through 50th heroes. | |
| Hello Kitty and Friends x Overwatch | February 10, 2026 | February 23, 2026 | Crossover skins based on Hello Kitty and Friends. | |
| Nier Automata x Overwatch | March 10, 2026 | March 24, 2026 | Crossover skins with Nier: Automata. | |
| Season 2: Summit | April 14, 2026 | June 15, 2026 | Introduces Sierra as the 51st hero. | |
| Overwatch x Hatred's Reckoning | April 28, 2026 | May 18, 2026 | Crossover skins with the Diablo franchise. | |
| Overwatch 10th Anniversary | May 12, 2026 | June 1, 2026 | 10th Anniversary of the Overwatch franchise, with special Overwatch Classic modes. | |
| Season 3: Into the Tigers's Den | June 16, 2026 | August 10, 2026 | Introduced Shion as new hero | |
| Season 4: Heroes of Busan | August 11, 2026 | | Introduced D.Mon as new hero. Rework of battle passes, and rework of several maps. | |
