= Hanzo (Overwatch) =

Fictional character in Overwatch

Hanzo Shimada
- Overwatch character
- Hanzo's appearance in Overwatch
- First game: Overwatch (2016)
- Created by: Jeff Kaplan (Assassin concept)
- Designed by: Arnold Tsang
- Voiced by: Paul Nakauchi

In-universe information
- Class: Damage
- Nationality: Japanese

Hanzo Shimada is a character who first appeared in the 2016 video game Overwatch, a Blizzard Entertainment–developed first-person hero shooter, and the resulting franchise. Outside of Overwatch, Hanzo also appears in related media, which includes animated shorts and webcomics, as well as a playable character in the crossover multiplayer online game Heroes of the Storm. He appeared again in Overwatch 2, a 2022 sequel to the original game.

Hanzo is Japanese and the elder brother of protagonist, Genji Shimada. The two brothers belonged to the Shimada clan, a fictional Japanese crime family. In his backstory, Hanzo was forced by the clan's elders to kill Genji. The dutiful but heartbroken Hanzo subsequently denounced his family and fled Japan to travel the world, seeking redemption from the actions of his past. In-game, he is classified as a damage character with a high difficulty ranking. He is an archer whose abilities include firing rapid bursts of arrows to engage high priority targets and jumping forward, as well as revealing the location of enemy players.

Hanzo has been well received by critics and fans alike, with praise being directed towards his character arc involving his brother, design, and abilities. However, reviewers have also noted the character requires practice in order to be used effectively in the game.

== Development and design ==
Hanzo and his brother Genji were originally one character.

While working on a massive multiplayer online game concept for Blizzard Entertainment, developer Geoff Goodman suggested the idea of a large number of character classes for players to select, but with class specialization for each. Fellow developer Jeff Kaplan took this idea to heart, salvaging character concepts from Titan—a then-recently cancelled Blizzard project—and character artwork by artist Arnold Tsang for that project. Kaplan created an eight-page pitch for a first person shooter concept to propose the idea which included a series of proposed characters, among them an armored female ninja character called "Assassin", armed with a bow and a katana, and able to parkour.

As development progressed, the design was modified to be a male cyborg ninja named Hanzo, with his weapon now just a bow. Further on, the concept was split into two separate sibling characters, with Hanzo retaining the bow and having a completely different design, while the newly-created Genji retained the armored ninja appearance and used a katana. According to lead writer Michael Chu, the split was necessary due to creating too much content for the original singular Hanzo concept, who was envisioned as a samurai-ninja hybrid. During development, Genji was referred to as "Sword Ninja" by the team, while Hanzo was called "Bow Ninja".

Hattori was also known as "Demon Hanzo" because of his tactician abilities, which is what inspired Hanzo's "Demon" skin during the "Overwatch Halloween Terror" seasonal event in October. Hanzo and Genji's story arc was inspired by the documentary Jiro Dreams of Sushi. Michael Chu, lead writer of Overwatch, described Hanzo's storyline as "will-he, won't-he fall to darkness", and stated that Hanzo is "real interesting because he can be a hero and a villain depending on your point of view – I think he can be both at the same time. There are more things to investigate there." In the English version of the game, Hanzo is voiced by Paul Nakauchi.

When Overwatch was first released, Hanzo had two normal abilities, the "Sonic Arrow" that would briefly highlight any enemies in range of where it landed for all his allies, and the "Scatter Arrow" that would split into five separate arrows that would ricochet off walls from the point of impact. The Scatter Arrow was found by Blizzard and players to often be too powerful, able to take out tank characters with normally high damage in a single shot. This also made Hanzo effectively play as a second sniper character alongside Widowmaker, and made him a difficult character to integrate into cooperative play. As early as November 2017, Jeff Kaplan and the Overwatch team discussed looking at vamping Hanzo's kit to deal with this problem. After a period of testing on the Public Test Region from April 20, 2018, the new kit was introduced on May 3, 2018. This kit replaced the "Scatter Arrow" with "Storm Arrows", the ability to fire six full-powered shots in rapid succession, along with a mid-air dash move. Along with other buffs and debuffs to other attack skills, these changes were designed to bring Hanzo to be more a front-line character.

== Gameplay ==
Hanzo is classified as a damage character in Overwatch. He is a sniper and wields the "Storm Bow". His bow has an infinite number of arrows that can be fired in succession of one another. Alternatively, the arrows can be charged up for one second for a higher damage output and higher arrow velocity. Hanzo has two attacks relating to his bow. The first is "Sonic Arrow", which allows him and his teammates to see the location of their enemies that pass within a sphere of influence from the point of impact, and the second being "Storm Arrow", in which Hanzo can fire five arrows at full power in rapid succession. Hanzo also has the ability to "Lunge", dashing forward if he is in mid-air. Hanzo's ultimate ability (Note: An ultimate ability is the strongest ability a character has in Overwatch. The ability slowly builds its meter over time, but the process can be sped up by defeating opponents or performing other beneficial tasks for their team such as healing other team members. Once the meter is full, the player can use the ability, which lasts for a few seconds, and then recharges the meter.) is "Dragonstrike"; when using this ability, Hanzo fires a single arrow that releases two dragons that travel in a straight line, passing through all walls, until the end of the map. Any enemy caught in the line of fire and touching the dragons takes continuous direct damage, which can kill most unprotected characters within seconds. Hanzo also has a passive ability called "Wall Climb" that allows him to scale walls.

== Appearances ==
According to the character's fictional biography, Hanzo Shimada is 40, and was formerly based in the fictional Japanese town Hanamura. Hanzo belongs to the Shimada family, a clan of assassins. As the eldest son in the family, Hanzo was bound by duty to inherit the Shimada empire from his father, Sojiro Shimada. From an early age, he was trained for that responsibility and showed skill in martial arts, bowmanship and swordplay. Upon his father's death, the clan elders instructed Hanzo to straighten out his younger brother Genji who was following a carefree, playboy lifestyle. When Genji refused, the clan elders forced Hanzo to kill him. Though, unbeknown to him, Genji was saved by Overwatch doctor Angela Ziegler. The act of killing his brother broke Hanzo's heart and drove him to abandon the clan. The lore states that Hanzo currently travels the world, "attempting to restore his honor and put the ghosts of his past to rest."

Hanzo was added to the Blizzard's crossover multiplayer online battle arena game Heroes of the Storm in December 2017, as part of the "Dragons of the Nexus" event. Hanzo's kit in the game is similar to his Overwatch abilities, including the charged, scatter, and sonic shot, wall-climb, and Dragonstrike. In 2026, Hanzo was one of several characters included in Overwatch Rush, a mobile game developed by Blizzard.

=== In other media ===
Hanzo, as he appears in "Tracer: Reflections", the tenth issue in the tie-in, digital comic series. Art by Miki Montlló.

In May 2016, Hanzo made his first appearance in Dragons, the third in a series of animated shorts. In the short, Hanzo returns to the Shimada castle in Hanamura to honor his brother Genji on the anniversary of their fight and the resulting latter's apparent death. Despite numerous guards being present, he is able to easily overpower them before they can alert anyone else. While making offerings at his brother's shrine, a man appears from out of the shadows, whom Hanzo presumes was sent to kill him. The two fight evenly matched until Hanzo, out of arrows, attempts to use Dragonstrike to defeat his opponent. To his surprise, the assassin is also able to use the Shimada dragons and turns them against him. Defeated, Hanzo coldly accepts his death. The assassin spares Hanzo and reveals himself to be Genji, alive after all these years. The cybernetic ninja tells Hanzo that he has forgiven him for having attempted to kill him. When Genji attempts to leave, Hanzo draws out his bow, labelling him a fool and stating that "real life is not like the stories [their] father told [them]". Despite this, Genji said that he still believed in his brother and had hope for him before leaving. With Genji gone, Hanzo returned to finish his offering.

Hanzo made his first appearance in the digital comic "Tracer: Reflection", which was released in December 2016. In the comic, which is set during Christmas, Hanzo is depicted with a different style than his appearance in the game. This includes him wearing an earring and a nose piercing, in addition to having his hair in an undercut style. In the comic, he's shown staring at a strawberry cake inside a shop with a little boy behind him.

== Reception ==
Shortly after the game came out, Hanzo was described as a "fan favorite" by Matt Kim of Inverse and "one of the more colorful characters" of the cast in the game by Motherboard's Emmanuel Maiberg. In Twinfinite's competition for "Gaming's Best 2017 Archer", Hanzo won in two out of four categories; "Arrow Variety" and "Fashion Style". Justin Carter stated that "he may take a lot of time to learn, but once you do, it pays off, and you’ll be one of the best snipers in your team while you play Overwatch."

Within the gaming community, players that frequently select Hanzo as their character are often derogatorily called "Hanzo mains", as other players typically feel the "Hanzo mains" are not sufficiently skilled with the character to contribute to the team's effort. Such "Hanzo mains" are frequently ridiculed or told to switch to other characters. Some have even have been reported for abusive behavior through Blizzard's system for selecting Hanzo. Kotaku spoke to several players who frequently play Hanzo; these players felt that Hanzo was one of the more well-balanced characters once one becomes skilled at playing him. Additionally, they stated that the hate towards Hanzo is more likely from other players feeling a Hanzo player makes for a good scapegoat when the team is otherwise not cohesive.

The term "Hanzo main" has been used outside of the Overwatch context as well. During the 2016 US presidential election, Nuisance Committee–made by the creators of Cards Against Humanity–created a billboard depicting Donald Trump playing Overwatch that read "Donald Trump mains Hanzo and complains about team comp in chat". The term became further popularized by a viral tweet in March 2017, when a schoolgirl was reprimanded by her school for calling a classmate a "Hanzo main" for stealing her pencil.

Mateus Mognon created the Hanzo National Church in Brazil in 2017 to honor the character. Mognon stated that he created the church as a form of protest art in order to show how ludicrous the Brazilian legislative system is. Additionally, the reason he chose Hanzo instead of Lúcio or Mercy—characters associated with healing in-game—is due to the character's resemblance to Jesus.

In May 2017, the social networking website Tumblr sifted through its data in order to determine which character pairings in Overwatch were the most popular. The data revealed that Hanzo and Cassidy (known as McCree at the time, resulting in the nickname "McHanzo") were the most popular pairing and that in all "shipping" related posts, they were shipped 35% of the time. (Note: Shipping, derived from the word relationship, is the desire by fans for two or more people, either real-life individuals or fictional characters (in film, literature, television etc.) to be in a relationship, romantic or otherwise. Such pairings are called "ships" and often have their own names.) A McHanzo-related fan fiction story titled "Hang the Fool", published on Archive of Our Own, was noted by Kotaku for being long-running. First starting in June 2016, the fanfic had garnered more than 300,000 hits by the end of 2017, even getting a fanzine based on it published. "Hang the Fool" was recognized by Syfy's Kristina Manete in 2020, and Manete noted another McHanzo fic titled "The Chain" for being a "wonderful study of [Cassidy] and Hanzo's personalities and pasts culminates in a spectacular fic for fans of the pair". While McHanzo is not canonized within Overwatch and Blizzard has not confirmed it, people involved with the game and company have acknowledged it. Cassidy's voice actor Matthew Mercer has described the pairing as "adorable", noting that the characters' contrasting personalities makes the ship interesting. Director and lead designer of Overwatch, Jeff Kaplan, when asked by a fan at BlizzCon 2017, stated that McHanzo is one of his two favorite ships from the game; the other being Pharah and Mercy.
