= Status effect =

Temporary modification to a game character's original set of stats

Status effects in the MMORPG Final Fantasy XIV. The game uses upward pointing icons to denote buffs and downward pointing ones for debuffs. A number below each status effect indicates its remaining duration. Hovering over an icon shows an explanation of the effect.

In video games, a status effect—also called a status condition or status ailment—is a temporary modification to a character’s attributes, abilities, or conditions. Status effects are a prominent feature in many massively multiplayer online role-playing games (MMORPGs), where they are commonly referred to as buffs (which provide positive enhancements to attributes like damage, defense, or speed) and debuffs (which impose negative conditions such as reduced damage, immobilization, or damage-over-time).

In MMORPGs, these mechanics play a central role in combat and progression systems, shaping player strategy, group coordination, and class roles.

== History ==
The concept of status effects originates from tabletop role-playing games. The Player's Handbook for the first edition Advanced Dungeons & Dragons released in 1978 declares that certain spells a player character can cast have "effects" in addition to their range and duration.

The terms "buff" and "debuff" were first used in the 1999 MMORPG Everquest and have been further popularized by Blizzard's 2004 MMORPG World of Warcraft.

Status effects have since been featured in a variety of RPGs and become a regular core mechanic in video game series like Final Fantasy, Shin Megami Tensei, and Pokémon.

== Mechanisms ==
While implementations vary across gaming genres, a status effect is typically a temporary effect resulting from an in-game event or action, often ending after a set duration or once a specific condition is met.

=== Application ===
Status effects, especially buffs, may be applied as a result of one character performing a type of action on another. Players may also acquire status effects by consuming items, defeating enemies, interacting with the game world or NPCs, or remaining in a particular location. Some games offer permanent status effects which persist for an entire level and act as modifications to the game's native difficulty.

=== Removal ===
The process of removing a status effect varies. Some status effects expire after a certain amount of time has elapsed or can be removed with items capable of healing specific status effects, or rarer items which can heal all of them. Many games also include magic spells that can eliminate status effects.

Many games in the Final Fantasy series include items and spells that remove status effects. Common examples are Antidotes, which cure poison; Smelling Salts, which cure sleep; and Remedies, which cure multiple conditions. The recurring spell Esuna is typically available to healer-oriented characters or as materia in Final Fantasy VII, and removes most negative status effects from the target.

Status effects are often removed at the end of a battle or once the originating enemy is defeated, however some may persist until they are explicitly cured. Games which allow players to rest may remove some status effects when that action is taken. If a game has multiple classes, one will often be a class capable of healing, who will have a greater ability to remove negative status effects than other classes.

=== Immunity or mitigation ===
In addition, many games have weapons, armour, or other equipment that can mitigate status effects or prevent a character from getting one in the first place. Depending on the game, some increase the chance to escape suffering the effect each time the player may potentially receive it, while others grant complete immunity. However, sometimes the equipment that is resisting an effect, will in exchange, as a penalty, increase vulnerability against a different effect, offering the player the opportunity to make tactical choices.

== See also ==
- Dungeons & Dragons
- Pathfinder Roleplaying Game
