= Pharah =

- Overwatch character
- Pharah's appearance in Overwatch
- First appearance: Overwatch (2016)
- Created by: Geoff Goodman
- Designed by: Justin Thavirat
- Voiced by: Jen Cohn

In-universe information
- Class: Damage
- Nationality: Egyptian

Pharah (/fɑːrɑː/) is the call sign of Fareeha Amari, a character who first appeared in the 2016 video game Overwatch, a Blizzard Entertainment–developed first-person hero shooter, and the resulting franchise. Voiced by Jen Cohn, she is an Egyptian woman trying to follow in her mother's footsteps she enlists in a military unit and helping to defend her local community, going by the call sign "Pharah". She later joins the restored peace-keeping force Overwatch alongside her mother and childhood friend. In a 2023 short story by Blizzard, the character was revealed to be a lesbian.

She was one of the first characters added to Overwatch during its development, after complications arose when trying to implement a different character. Conceived by Geoff Goodman as a male character with a rocket launcher and a Jetpack, the character was originally named "Rocket Dude" and went through multiple iterations and names during development, before Blizzard decided to make the character female instead, utilizing a design by Justin Thavirat as a guide to develop her look.

Video game media and academic writers have mixed feelings on Pharah's characterization, with the portrayal of her various ethnic backgrounds and representation of women being considerably discussed. Depicted as half-Egyptian and half-Indigenous Canadian, some have viewed Pharah's portrayal through a white voice actress and Indigenous-themed skins in-game as unfavorable. Blizzard's lack of development in the way of Pharah's official narrative elements has also been lamented, while many fan-generated depictions of the character have emerged and been discussed by various media outlets.

== Conception and development ==
One of the original characters made for Overwatch's earliest version, project lead Geoff Goodman started with a gameplay concept of a character with a jetpack and a rocket launcher. At this point in development, the overall tone for the game and its characters were not fully defined. According to Overwatch game director Jeff Kaplan in the earliest versions of Overwatch the character was originally named "Mercy". However, playtesters were confused when told to switch to Mercy, instead selecting the angel-themed character "Angelica". To fix this issue, Angelica was renamed Mercy, while the other character's name was changed to "Rocket Dude". Originally, the character was not included in the earliest builds, and the character Reinhardt was focused on instead. However, after running into difficulties with Reinhardt's melee-centric gameplay, Goodman offered his character, which at this point was just a male character model armed with a rocket launcher and a jetpack. The developers, however, found Rocket Dude incredibly fun to play, and development on them progressed.

While early on they defined a playstyle and Egyptian heritage as integral to the character, a multitude of concepts were considered, ranging from armored dragons and heavy armored mech suits to stylized male fighter pilots. In particular the developers noted that the fighter pilots did not capture the "fantasy" the team was trying to display in Overwatch, while the heavy armor felt too "tank-like". Artist Justin Thavirat submitted a design consisting of black armor suit with a large mag-fed rocket launcher that was well received by the development team, and even included in the original pitch meeting for the game. However, Art Director Arnold Tsang felt the design was "a little too high concept" and they started over with the concept of a man with a rocket jetpack. Thavirat's design was later revisited, however, and slowly congealed into the finalized look for her character.

Upon the decision to make the character female, their name was changed to "Rocket Queen", in reference to the Guns & Roses song of the same name. Rocket Queen persisted as her internal codename during development, even after her name was changed to Pharah, which itself was another much-earlier name for the game's angel-themed character. The character's personality also went through several concepts, before settling on her being altruistic with the developers joking that she has a "'Captain America' kind of vibe where she is all about justice and order and trying to make the world a better place and just kinda bring order to the chaos." Working on Pharah assisted the development team with establishing the game's visual style, as well as providing a guide to the overall look for its future playable characters.

=== Design ===
Standing 5 feet 11 inches (180 cm) tall, Pharah is an Egyptian woman of color with black hair extending to her neck with gold beaded braids in the front, and an Eye of Horus tattoo under her right eye. She wears a full-body blue and black combat suit with gold highlights dubbed the "Raptora Mark VI", that features independently posable wings with thrusters that allow for short-term flight. Her design also features a blue removable helmet that features grey decorative wings extending from the sides and a transparent, beak-like visor extending the front that overlays over the top of her face. Her primary weapon is a blunderbuss-esque black rocket launcher fed through a top loaded magazine, while additional rockets can be fired from her lower arms and shoulder compartments. For Overwatch 2, Pharah's visual look underwent subtle changes, including the lower half of her armor being made to include white in addition to its already-present blue color, and increased transparency for her visor.

Like other Overwatch characters, Pharah received skins, unlockable cosmetic items that change her in-game appearance. Various skins like "Mechaqueen" and "Mechatron" lean into a mecha anime aesthetic and emphasize a mecha appearance for her combat suit. Two notable skins include "Thunderbird" and "Raindancer", which are based on Indigenous imagery, specifically the art motifs of Pacific Northwest cultures. When asked about these skins in an interview with Kotaku, Kaplan stated the development team was impressed upon seeing the concept art for the skins and after some internal questioning they opted to implement them into the game. While Kaplan stated the development team was open to removing the skin if fans felt a line was crossed, the skin ultimately remained in the game and Pharah was confirmed to be half-Indigenous Canadian through her father.

== Appearances ==
Fareeha Amari is an Egyptian woman introduced in the 2016 first-person shooter Overwatch, voiced by Jen Cohn. Her mother, Ana, was a member of the global peace-keeping force "Overwatch", before vanishing. Aspiring to follow in her footsteps, she enlisted in and rose up through the officer ranks of the Egyptian army. Before being able to join Overwatch, the organization disbanded, and she instead become an officer at a private security firm. Under the call sign "Pharah", she is tasked with defending an artificial intelligence research facility. She later returns in the game's sequel, Overwatch 2. In 2026, Pharah was one of several characters included in Overwatch Rush, a mobile game developed by Blizzard.

Her story is further fleshed out in the digital comic book series, first appearing in Pharah: Mission Statement, the fifth issue of the 2016 Overwatch tie-in comic book series. In it, an aggressive artificial intelligence called "Anubis" at the facility breaches containment and proceeds to take control of surrounding robots to attack everyone, including Pharah and her team. When her team captain is killed in the attack, she rallies the remaining members to attack and destroy Anubis, and through its use of a hive mind, traps it in a feedback loop. Afterwards, the team promotes her to be their new captain. She later appears in the second issue of Overwatch's New Blood comic miniseries, protecting a community from the terrorist group Talon, when she is approached by her childhood friend Cassidy, and later her estranged mother. Though they ask her to join a restored Overwatch group, she declines, stating that she is needed in her home more. After Talon attacks again, they work together to fight them off, and while Pharah decides to remain where she is, she is willing to revisit the idea of joining them at a later date. In issue 5 of New Blood, Pharah is shown to have joined the group between chapters, helping to defend the city of Busan from attack.

Pharah appears in As You Are, one of many short stories released by Blizzard as part of the 2023 Pride event for Overwatch 2. In it, when asked if she has any romantic interest in Cassidy, she laughs and responds no, stating that she is a lesbian.

=== Gameplay ===
In Overwatch, Pharah is classified as a Damage-class character, designed to provide a more offensive role in team compositions. Her short term flight ability makes her one of the most mobile characters in the game, able to reach any point on a map and far more height. By holding the jump button, she can utilize her passive "Hover Jets" ability to gain upward momentum slowly until the button is released. Pharah's main form of attack, her rocket launcher, fires a long range projectile that explodes to deal splash damage, hitting enemies caught in the radius, with a direct hit doing significantly more damage. The attacks can also damage her. In a Reddit "ask me anything" thread with the Overwatch developers, Geoff Goodman compared Pharah's gameplay to that of another first-person shooter, Tribes.

Pharah also has several abilities that require activation, though the first two have a cooldown period after use and are unable to be used again during that duration. "Jump Jet" gives a burst of upward movement, at a much higher pace than "Hover Jets", and can enable her to reach high ground areas more quickly. Alternatively Pharah's "Concussive Blast" fires a projectile that pushes away any characters caught in its blast radius, including Pharah, but will not damage her allowing it to be used for mobility. Lastly her 'ultimate' ability, "Barrage", must be charged before use. The ability charges slowly during the course of gameplay and can be charged faster through damage dealt to the enemy team. Once full, the ability can be activated to fire a stream of rockets for a short duration; whilst allowing limited movement. During development, the Overwatch team visualized a giant transparent eagle head appearing behind her as a visual component of the ability. However, they felt this did not fit Pharah's tone or her level of technology, and chose instead to simplify the move visually.

== Promotion and reception ==
To promote Overwatch and the character, Pharah was one of twelve heroes showcased in a playable build of the game at the 2014 BlizzCon convention, and later featured among a series of life-size boxed "action figures" to promote the game's release, with Pharah's showcased in Busan, South Korea. Additional material included a cosplay guide and promotional images themed around holidays. The Good Smile Company released a Figma-line figurine of Pharah in December 2018, while Hasbro released a figure of their own, packaged with fellow character Mercy in 2019. In 2023 for Pride Month, they released a series of cosmetics for the character to celebrate her as a part of the LGBT community.

Known for her considerable damage output, Pharah is a popular choice among players who opt for DPS (damage per second) characters. Sources such as Kotaku and the book The Costumes of Burlesque have noted her as a frequent subject of cosplay, with particularly elaborate results. Early in the first two years of Overwatch's release, players would often select her alongside another player utilizing Mercy, due to their shared flight abilities meshing well. Community reaction to this cohesion led to the pairing being dubbed "PharMercy" by players and media outlets, with a large amount of fan art and fan fiction portraying them as romantically involved with each other. Ana Valens, in an article for The Mary Sue, praised her as one of the best female characters introduced to the series, citing the character's "themes of intergenerational conflict, duty, and coping with life's twists and turns". She additionally praised the portrayal of motherhood through her relationship with Ana, noting it as something few games illustrated well, if all. However, some, such as Joseph Knoop of The Daily Dot, lamented how little Pharah was developed in the story itself, stating Blizzard did "surprisingly little" with her as a character. He further added that while supplemental material to the games tried to provide her portrayal with some emotional payoff, "just like Pharah's sky-high leaps, it seems like she'll always be out of reach."

Pharah's Thunderbird (promotional artwork pictured) and Raindancer skins in Overwatch drew criticisms regarding the subject of cultural appropriation.

Biologist and Paleontologist Rodrigo B. Salvador cited Pharah's design as heavily influenced by her nationality in a paper for The Journal of Geek Studies, noting that her armor and tattoo took heavy inspiration from the Egyptian god Horus and the significance of those elements in her design, specifically the lanner falcon which he felt was implied both by the suit's name and its bird-shaped helmet. He further conflated her role and character in Overwatch to that of a pharaoh whose duty is to uphold "truth, harmony, morality and justice" due to her name, personality and portrayal. He was, however, critical of the comic's statement that her tattoo was intended to represent her desire to protect others, when its connotation was meant to protect the wearer, but felt that was a minor slipup in her backstory. He closed by praising her design as a whole and how well it tied to her heritage, making her one of his favorite characters in the title.

Pharah's representation as a woman and an Egyptian in the series have been heavily discussed, as the character is noted as one of only two playable females in Overwatch that "do not have expressively supportive functions as part of their skillset", though her flying from a distance was seen as an example of the "smaller, weaker, and faster" archetype for female characters in video games. The book Gender and the Super Hero Narrative noted that Pharah was positive representation as a female heroine, her design focusing less on physical attractiveness as a defining trait and more on "skill sets and abilities typically reserved for male hero counterparts." However, the book Cooperative Gaming: Diversity in the Games Industry and How to Cultivate Inclusion drew issue with her character being portrayed by a white voice actress, citing it as an example of digital blackface they felt negated the impact of her representation within the series. Amr Al-Aaser of Waypoint was particularly critical of her design, feeling that the use of Egyptian imagery "flatten[ed] the existence of an entire people to easily recognizable images", while also denouncing the choice of a white voice actress for her character. Alya Arthur of The Daily Dot also criticized her design, stating that while on the surface she looked impressive it followed a trend of giving female video game characters "swimsuit-esque body morph suits" to emphasize their bodies instead of visible muscle and bulk.

Pharah's "Thunderbird" and "Raindancer" skins drew criticism from fans online, who argued the skins were culturally appropriating Indigenous imagery. Fans also questioned why the skins were based on Indigenous imagery, when Pharah had long been detailed as of Egyptian origin. Shahryar Rizvi of Kill Screen commented that despite the skins being designed with Pacific Northwest Coastal cultures in mind, that the "face paint is most likely influenced by the Mohawk people in Ontario, Quebec, and upstate New York". After the Reflections issue featured Pharah having dinner with her Indigenous father, Cecilia D'Anastasio of Kotaku reflected on the controversy surrounding her outfit, asking "was Pharah's somewhat obtuse lore added to quell players' accusations of cultural appropriation? It's hard to say," while citing a "strongly-worded Medium post by a Dia Lacina, a Native woman," that "questioned whether Pharah's father is the 'Convenient Indian.'" Lacina also opined that "corporate interests and fandom demands aligned so they can make those skins 'acceptable' while getting bonus points for finally having a Native in Overwatch's lore." Al-Aaser, in his previous critique of the character, viewed Blizzard's response harshly, stating it would have been better to have simply apologized and that by using canon from outside the game to justify their response, it "felt like Blizzard had personally spat" at him.

Her reveal as a lesbian was more positively received, with TheGamer's Harry Schofield praising the writing of the short story for how well it portrayed her as a queer character talking with a friend. He felt it was a significant improvement over past attempts at LGBT representation in Overwatch, stating that while it could be seen as rainbow capitalism on the part of Blizzard, it still showed "marked improvements in how exactly it goes about making that representation authentic". Game Rant's Martin Wood also offered thoughts on the portrayal, praising how the story presented Pharah as someone confident in her identity speaking to someone else trying to find theirs, stating that she presented a "clear message of support through togetherness, acceptance, and willingness to change for the better."

== See also ==
- List of video games with LGBT characters: 2010s
