= Tank (video games) =

Style of character in gaming

A tank or meat shield is a character class commonly seen in co-op video games such as real-time strategy games, role-playing games, fighting games, multiplayer online battle arenas and MUDs.

Tank characters deliberately attract enemy attention and attacks (potentially by using game mechanics that force them to be targeted) to act as a decoy for teammates. Since this requires them to endure concentrated enemy attacks, they typically rely on a high health pool or support by friendly healers to survive while sacrificing their own damage output.

Since they keep other members of a team alive, tanks often take on an unofficial leadership role:

The tank acts as the de facto leader of the group by pulling and holding monsters' attention. It's up to me to set the pace as we clear the dungeon. But more than knowing how much the party can handle at once, I need to know where those monsters need to be positioned, what direction they should face, and what abilities they can use that might threaten the group. I'm also expected to stay on top of all the current meta strategies for beating a dungeon. When shortcuts are found that let players skip monsters, I need to know them.

The term was used as early as 1992 on Usenet to describe the warrior class on BatMUD.

== Overview ==
In most games with tank classes, three factors contribute to a tank's survivability:

- a large amount of health for absorbing damage
- damage mitigation, often accomplished through an armor or defense mechanic
- the ability to avoid attacks altogether

Depending on the game, a tank may employ any combination of these:

- In Final Fantasy XI two commonly used tanking styles are nicknamed "Blood Tanks" and "Blink Tanks". A blood tank focuses purely on taking hits through higher than usual HP pools or heavy defense ratings. A blink tank focuses on evasiveness to prevent damage from landing in the first place.
- In Eve Online, a common form of tanking, called speed tanking, entails moving quickly enough to outpace the tracking of an enemy ship's turrets.
- In Sins of a Solar Empire, the Radiance Battleship has an ability called Animosity, which causes it to take all incoming damage. This can allow the Rapture Battlecruiser to deploy a reactive damage spell.
- In Ragnarok Online the signature tank belongs to the Swordsman Line in the Crusader, who can use a skill known as "Sacrifice" which places an aura around up to five party members. While this skill is active those who've had the skill cast on them will not take damage and instead the tank will take all of the inflicted damage from all "Sacrificed" party members.

== See also ==
- Healer (gaming), another common archetype focused on restoring the health of one's allies.
- Spell-caster (gaming), another common archetype focused on dealing damage, but is relatively weak in all other regards.
- DPS, another common archetype also focused on dealing damage.
- Bloodbath of B-R5RB, a famously large multiplayer battle which hinged on Sort Dragon's particularly successful tanking,
