= List of video games with LGBTQ characters: 2010s =

The following is a list of confirmed video games with gay, lesbian, bisexual, or transgender characters, including any others falling under the LGBTQ umbrella term, in the 2010s. The numbers in this list are possibly higher due to fact that some characters remained unconfirmed, unsourced or controversial.

== 2010s ==
=== 2010 ===
Title	Character(s)	Identity	Notes
Nier	Emil	Gay	Emil, a player companion, is hinted to have feelings for Nier in both the game and a Nier: Automata companion novel, "Emil's Recollection". This was confirmed by director Yoko Taro in an interview, seen in the companion book Grimoir Nier.
Nier	Kainé	Intersex	Kainé is intersex and identifies as a woman.
Scott Pilgrim vs. the World: The Game	Ramona Flowers	Bisexual	Like the Scott Pilgrim graphic novel series, Ramona Flowers has seven evil exes: six ex-boyfriends and her lesbian ex-girlfriend Roxanne.
Scott Pilgrim vs. the World: The Game	Roxanne "Roxie" Richter	Lesbian	Like the Scott Pilgrim graphic novel series, Ramona Flowers has seven evil exes: six ex-boyfriends and her lesbian ex-girlfriend Roxanne.
Scott Pilgrim vs. the World: The Game	Knives Chau	Bisexual	In the original graphic novel, Knives and Kim eventually get together after they became ex-girlfriends of Scott.
Scott Pilgrim vs. the World: The Game	Kim Pine	Bisexual	In the original graphic novel, Knives and Kim eventually get together after they became ex-girlfriends of Scott.
Scott Pilgrim vs. the World: The Game	Wallace Wells	Gay	Wallace, Scott's roommate, appears in the game as both a background character and running an item shop. A downloadable content released in 2013 added him as a playable character.
Super Meat Boy	Jill	Lesbian	Super Meat Boy features Jill from Mighty Jill Off as an unlockable character. In her game, Jill is submissive in a lesbian relationship.

=== 2011 ===
Title	Character(s)	Identity	Notes
Catherine	Erica Anderson	Trans woman	Erica, the waitress at The Stray Sheep, is a trans woman.
Dragon Age II	Anders, Fenris, Isabela, and Merrill	Bisexual	Anders, Fenris, Isabela, and Merrill are four of Hawke's companions who express romantic interest without regard to Hawke's gender.
The Elder Scrolls V: Skyrim	Female NPCs (Note: Aela the Huntress, Aeri, Anwen, Avrusa Sarethi, Borgahk the Steel Heart, Brelyna Maryon, Camilla Valerius, Dravynea the Stoneweaver, Ghorza gra-Bagol, Gilfre, Grelka, Iona, Jenassa, Jordis the Sword-Maiden, Lydia, Mjoll the Lioness, Muiri, Njada Stonearm, Orla, Ria, Senna, Shahvee, Sylgja, Taarie, Temba Wide-Arm, Uthgerd, Viola Giordano, Ysolda)	Bisexual	The player may marry a non-player character regardless of race or gender. To initiate marriage, the player must complete the quest The Bonds of Matrimony, which requires speaking with Maramal about marriage and wearing an Amulet of Mara to signal marital availability. Once an eligible NPC whose disposition toward the player is sufficiently high expresses consent, the marriage ceremony takes place at the Temple of Mara. After the wedding, the player may decide where the couple will reside, either by having the spouse move into one of the player's properties or by relocating to the spouse's home. Marriage also grants various in-game benefits, including access to home-cooked meals.
The Elder Scrolls V: Skyrim	Male NPCs (Note: Ainethach, Angrenor Once-Honored, Argis the Bulwark, Athis, Balimund, Belrand, Benor Calder, Cosnach, Derkeethus, Erik the Slayer, Farkas, Filnjar, Gat gro-Shargakh, Ghorbash the Iron Hand, Marcurio, Moth gro-Bagol, Octieve San, Omluag, Onmund, Pavo Attius, Perth, Quintus Navale, Revyn Sadri, Roggi Knot-Beard, Romlyn Dreth, Scouts-Many-Marshes, Sondas Drenim, Sorex Vinius, Stenvar, Torvar, Vilkas, Vorstag, Wilhelm)	Bisexual	
The Elder Scrolls V: Skyrim	Bjornolfr and Hrodulf	Gay	Bjornolfr, a resident of Solitude, maintained a relationship with his lover Hrodulf after the latter relocated to Solstheim. There, Hrodulf took shelter in an abandoned shack and began to hear persistent nocturnal noises emanating from beneath it. His attempts to uncover their source led him to tunnel below the structure, where he discovered a functioning Dwemer mechanism; prolonged exposure to its rumbling gradually eroded his sanity, a decline evident in his increasingly disturbed letters to Bjornolfr. Alarmed, Bjornolfr travelled to Solstheim despite Hrodulf's warnings, but was killed by reavers near the shack. An Amulet of Mara and a gold ring found in Bjornolfr's boat indicate that he intended to marry Hrodulf.

=== 2012 ===
Title	Character(s)	Identity	Notes
Analogue: A Hate Story	*Hyun-ae	Bisexual	*Hyun-ae is an AI that can confess her feeling to the player regardless of gender.
Animal Crossing: New Leaf	Isabelle	Bisexual or pansexual	Isabelle, the secretary to the town mayor, is hinted to be bisexual/pansexual as indicated by an apparent crush on the player-character, regardless of gender.
Dys4ia	Player character	Lesbian trans woman	Based on Anna Anthropy's experiences, the player controls a character transitioning and undergoing hormone replacement therapy.
Guild Wars 2	Caithe	Lesbian	Caithe and Faolain are minor characters, two female sylvari in a lesbian relationship.
Guild Wars 2	Marjory Delaqua	Lesbian	In a relationship with female NPC Kasmeer Meade throughout the game, with both of them kissing during a cutscene in "The Battle for Lion's Arch". Their sexual relationship was confirmed by the developers in the installment The Origins of Madness (2014).
Guild Wars 2	Faolain	Lesbian	In a romantic relationship with Caithe.
Guild Wars 2	Kasmeer Meade	Lesbian	In a relationship with female NPC Marjory Delaqua throughout the game.
Guild Wars 2	Sya	Trans woman	Sya was assigned male at birth. She used magic to aid in her transition.
Kindred Spirits on the Roof	A ghost couple and other couples	Lesbian	The main character Toomi Yuna helps a ghostly lesbian couple create other lesbian couples at her school.
My Ex-Boyfriend the Space Tyrant	Tycho Minogue and most characters	Gay	The majority of characters, including the player character Tycho Minogue, are gay men.

=== 2013 ===
Title	Character(s)	Identity	Notes
Dirty Bomb	Nader	Lesbian	Nader's backstory includes that that she moved to London with her wife before the Dirty Bomb incident.
Gone Home	Samantha "Sam" Greenbriar and Yolanda "Lonnie" DeSoto	Lesbian	This is a lesbian coming of age story that centers around the protagonist's younger sister Samantha and her girlfriend Yolanda.
No, Thank You!!!	Various boys	Gay	Various characters in this game are gay.
Pokémon X and Y	Nova	Trans woman	Nova is a Pokémon Trainer found at the Battle Maison. She is a Beauty (おとなのおねえさん, Otona no Onee-san; lit. "Adult Miss"), an exclusively female trainer class, who states that she used to be a Black Belt (からておう, Karate Ō; lit. "Karate King"), an exclusively male trainer class. In the Japanese version of the game, she explicitly credits her transformation to medical science, but this was cut from the English version.
The Last of Us	Bill and Frank	Gay	Bill is a character who helps Joel and Ellie during their journey. It is heavily implied he is gay and had a partner named Frank, who is later found dead, much to Bill's dismay. A note left by Frank claims he did not love Bill anymore.
The Walking Dead: Season Two	Matthew and Walter	Gay	The second episode features Mathew and Walter, a gay couple.

=== 2014 ===
Title	Character(s)	Identity	Notes
BioShock Infinite: Burial at Sea	Sander Cohen	Gay	A returning character from the first BioShock, the insane artist is confirmed to be gay by the game's creative director Ken Levine.
Coming Out on Top	Player character	Gay	The protagonist is a gay man who finds himself in romantic relationships and erotic situations with other men, which is often illustrated with explicit graphic images.
Coming Out Simulator 2014	Nicky Case	Queer	This is an autobiographical game about a teenage Nicky Case coming out to their mother. Jack is their boyfriend.
Coming Out Simulator 2014	Jack	Queer	This is an autobiographical game about a teenage Nicky Case coming out to their mother. Jack is their boyfriend.
Destiny	Osiris; Saint-14	Gay	Game designer Robert Brooke wrote the two characters as in a romantic relationship from their introduction but had been vague about it, but only made it more explicit with ongoing updates to Destiny 2 in 2020.
Destiny	Oryx	Trans man	Oryx, the main character in the Destiny: The Taken King, is revealed to be a transgender man in a series of unlockable stories in the game.
Dragon Age: Inquisition	Sera and Dagna	Lesbian	Sera, a female elven archer, is gay and thus is only available as a romance option if the player picks a female character; the two of them can also get married in the DLC Trespasser (2015), the first confirmed same-gender marriage in the franchise. If Sera is not romanced she will enter a relationship with a female dwarf named Dagna.
Dragon Age: Inquisition	Dorian Pavus	Gay	Dorian Pavus is a gay male mage who can be romanced by male player characters. Dorian's upbeat personality hides a dark family secret relating to his sexual orientation. The Iron Bull, a male qunari warrior, is openly pansexual and can be romanced by male and female player characters. If neither Dorian nor Iron Bull are romanced then they can optionally enter a relationship. Bull was confirmed by Patrick Weekes as pansexual.
Dragon Age: Inquisition	Iron Bull	Pansexual	Dorian Pavus is a gay male mage who can be romanced by male player characters. Dorian's upbeat personality hides a dark family secret relating to his sexual orientation. The Iron Bull, a male qunari warrior, is openly pansexual and can be romanced by male and female player characters. If neither Dorian nor Iron Bull are romanced then they can optionally enter a relationship. Bull was confirmed by Patrick Weekes as pansexual.
Dragon Age: Inquisition	Josephine Montilyet	Bisexual	The Inquisition's chief diplomat, Josephine Montilyet, is bisexual and can be romanced by male and female player characters. She is also voiced by queer actress Allegra Clark.
Dragon Age: Inquisition	Lace Harding	Pansexual	An "unofficial" romance option for an Inquisitor of either gender is the dwarven scout Lace Harding. Though her "romance" consists entirely of flirtatious dialogue with no additional cutscenes in the base game, the Trespasser DLC reveals the Inquisitor went on a date with her if they weren't already in a relationship and have flirted with her at every opportunity. She later became a romance option in Dragon Age: The Veilguard, and is pansexual.
Dragon Age: Inquisition	Cremisius "Krem" Aclassi	Trans man	Cremisius Aclassi, a transgender man known mostly by his nickname Krem, is a member of the Bull's Chargers mercenary company. He serves as the Iron Bull's lieutenant.
Dragon Age: Inquisition	Leliana	Bisexual	The game sees the return of the established bisexual character Leliana, although she is not a romance option.
Dreamfall Chapters	Kian Alvane	Gay	Kian Alvane, one of the main protagonists, is gay.
Queen's Gambit	Player character	Bisexual	The player character can romance Emily or one of three male characters.
Queen's Gambit	Emily Verma	Lesbian	The player character can romance Emily or one of three male characters.
The Binding of Isaac: Rebirth	Isaac	Genderfluid	Isaac creator Edmund McMillen has confirmed that Isaac is genderfluid, or at least gender confused. Some of the level transition screens show Isaac happily wearing a dress or a wig, before being bullied. All playable characters are different variations of Isaac as he struggles with his identity; he presents himself as both female (Magdalene, Eve, Lilith, Bethany) and non-binary (Eden) characters. Because of this, McMillen has cited gender identity as one of the game's implicit themes.
The Binding of Isaac: Rebirth	Isaac	Genderqueer	Isaac creator Edmund McMillen has confirmed that Isaac is genderfluid, or at least gender confused. Some of the level transition screens show Isaac happily wearing a dress or a wig, before being bullied. All playable characters are different variations of Isaac as he struggles with his identity; he presents himself as both female (Magdalene, Eve, Lilith, Bethany) and non-binary (Eden) characters. Because of this, McMillen has cited gender identity as one of the game's implicit themes.
The Binding of Isaac: Rebirth	Eden	Non-binary	Eden is a randomly generated character with no consistent appearance or identity- he can present as either male, female, or androgynous in each new run. In the post first introducing her, McMillen states that "Eden isn't a man, nor are they a woman ... they just are." He refers to them using he/she/they pronouns.
The Last of Us: Left Behind	Ellie	Lesbian	In The Last of Us (2013), Ellie is one of the main characters and Riley is sometimes mentioned. In the DLC prequel The Last of Us: Left Behind (2014), players control Ellie as she spends time with Riley, and it is implied Ellie has feelings for Riley, culminating in a kiss between them near the climax. The developers Naughty Dog later confirmed they have romantic feelings for each other and the writer for Ellie's character, Neil Druckmann, said he wrote her to be gay.
The Last of Us: Left Behind	Riley Abel	Lesbian	In The Last of Us (2013), Ellie is one of the main characters and Riley is sometimes mentioned. In the DLC prequel The Last of Us: Left Behind (2014), players control Ellie as she spends time with Riley, and it is implied Ellie has feelings for Riley, culminating in a kiss between them near the climax. The developers Naughty Dog later confirmed they have romantic feelings for each other and the writer for Ellie's character, Neil Druckmann, said he wrote her to be gay.

=== 2015 ===
Title	Character(s)	Identity	Notes
Astoria: Fate's Kiss	Player character	Bisexual	The player character is a woman, and can romance Medusa, Alex, or one of multiple male characters.
Astoria: Fate's Kiss	Medusa	Queer	Medusa can enter into a relationship with the protagonist.
Astoria: Fate's Kiss	Alex Cyprin	Queer	The protagonist can date Alex, who is non-binary and uses they/them pronouns.
Astoria: Fate's Kiss	Alex Cyprin	Non-binary	The protagonist can date Alex, who is non-binary and uses they/them pronouns.
The Witcher 3: Wild Hunt	Cirilla Fiona Elen Riannon (Note: known as "Ciri")	Bisexual	Ciri, a secondary playable character, when asked about her feelings towards Skjall (a male NPC), the player may answer that she prefers women. She also had a girlfriend named Mistle in the books that the games are based on.
The Witcher 3: Wild Hunt	Mislav	Gay	Mislav is a gay hunter encountered in the prologue.
Tom Clancy's Rainbow Six Siege	Flores	Gay	In Flores's psychological report it is mentioned that he has a husband.
Tom Clancy's Rainbow Six Siege	Osa	Trans woman	In Osa's biography, her transition is mentioned. It was also confirmed by Ubisoft that she is transgender.
Tom Clancy's Rainbow Six Siege	Sens	Non-binary	They identify as non-binary and use they/them pronouns, as seen in their biography and psychological report.
Tom Clancy's Rainbow Six Siege	Tubarão	Trans man	In Tubarão's psychological report, it is stated that he is trans. His transition is also mentioned in his biography.
Tom Clancy's Rainbow Six Siege	Pulse	Bisexual	Pulse flirts with his allies while healing them, regardless of gender, and has been confirmed by his original writer, Lauren Stone, to be bisexual.
Undertale	Napstablook	Non-binary	A ghost that is encountered numerous times throughout the game. In the world of Undertale, ghosts are genderless at birth. They are referred to with they/them pronouns in the game, and while the Undertale art book used to refer to them with male pronouns, this was changed when Fangamer released it.
We Know the Devil	Venus	Trans woman	Venus is a trans girl. Her pronouns in the narration change from "he" to "she" as she comes to terms with her identity.

=== 2016 ===
Title	Character(s)	Identity	Notes
Baldur's Gate: Siege of Dragonspear	Mizhena	Trans woman	Mizhena is a transgender woman who explains to the main character that she picked her strange name after transitioning. The character, among other aspects of the game's writing, was met with significant criticism. Beamdog later announced that they would be expanding the character's story a week after the expansion pack released, saying in part, "In retrospect, it would have been better served if we had introduced a transgender character with more development."
Dead by Daylight	The Birch	Trans woman	Originally from Crypt TV, The Birch was added to Dead By Daylight in May 2021 as an alternate skin for The Hag. In April 2021 Crypt TV announced on social media that The Birch is transgender.
Dead by Daylight	David King	Gay	In April 2022, the games' developers, Behaviour, revealed that David King, an original character first introduced in a July 2017 update, is the first confirmed LGBTQIA2+ original character of Dead by Daylight.
Dead by Daylight	The Look-See	Pansexual	Originally from Crypt TV, The Look-See was added to Dead By Daylight in May 2021 as an alternate skin for The Doctor. In April 2021 Crypt TV announced on social media that The Look-See is pansexual.
Dead by Daylight	The Mordeo	Genderqueer	Originally from Crypt TV, The Mordeo was added to Dead By Daylight in May 2021 as an alternate skin for The Huntress. In April 2021 Crypt TV announced on social media that The Mordeo is genderqueer.
Dead by Daylight	Orela Rose	Trans woman	Orela Rose, a survivor added in the 2025 "Steady Pulse" DLC. Her in game biography references her transition. She is also voiced by the actress Angelica Ross who is also trans.
Dead by Daylight	Tiffany Valentine	Bisexual	In November 2023 Chucky was added to Dead By Daylight in a DLC of the same name, with Tiffany included as an alternate skin for Chucky. In the Child's Play franchise Tiffany engages in relationships with both male and female characters.
Dead by Daylight	Tubarão	Trans man	Originally from the game Rainbow Six Siege, Tubarão was added to Dead By Daylight in December 2023. Tubarão's transition is mentioned in his biography in Rainbow Six Siege.
Dead by Daylight	Susie Lavoie	Lesbian	In the 4th issue of The Legion's origin comics, Susie, one of the killers who makes up the group, begins the issue in a dream sequence that culminates in her embracing, kissing, and revealing her crush on, fellow Legion member, Julie Kostenko.
Firewatch	Dave	Gay	In this game, the player can find various notes about two characters: Ron and Dave. Dave is said to have crushed on Ron, who never reciprocated his feelings.
Fragments of Him	Will	Bisexual	The game follows the story of Will, the player character, on his very last morning just before he gets in a car accident that leads to his untimely death. The game involves Will reminiscing past experiences and emotions. Sarah is Will's ex-girlfriend and Harry is his current boyfriend.
Fragments of Him	Harry	Gay	The game follows the story of Will, the player character, on his very last morning just before he gets in a car accident that leads to his untimely death. The game involves Will reminiscing past experiences and emotions. Sarah is Will's ex-girlfriend and Harry is his current boyfriend.
Gangsters in Love	Player character	Bisexual	The player character can romance Aurora or one of multiple male characters.
Gangsters in Love	Aurora James	Lesbian	The player character can romance Aurora or one of multiple male characters.
Overwatch & Overwatch 2 (2022)	Tracer and Emily	Lesbian	The heroine Tracer is shown in the tie-in webcomic Reflections (2016) to be in a romantic relationship with a female character named Emily. Tracer was confirmed to be a lesbian by Michael Chu, the lead writer of Overwatch.
Overwatch & Overwatch 2 (2022)	Soldier: 76 and Vincent	Gay	In the short story "Bastet", Soldier: 76 is revealed to have had a romantic relationship with a man named Vincent. Lead writer Michael Chu confirmed that both characters are gay.
Overwatch & Overwatch 2 (2022)	Lifeweaver	Pansexual	In the character's announcement, Blizzard confirmed that Lifeweaver, a male Thai botanist, is pansexual, with a previous relationship with Baptiste. Voice lines suggest flirting messages towards other characters regardless of their gender.
Overwatch & Overwatch 2 (2022)	Pharah	Lesbian	In Overwatch 2's first Pride event, Pharah was revealed to be a lesbian.
Overwatch & Overwatch 2 (2022)	Baptiste	Bisexual	In Overwatch 2's first Pride event, Baptiste was confirmed to be bisexual.
Overwatch & Overwatch 2 (2022)	Venture	Non-binary	The game's first non-binary character. Venture is voiced by non-binary voice actor Valeria Rodriguez.
Pridefest	—		In this game, the player is able to launch and manage an LGBT pride parade.
The Technomancer	Player characters	Gay	It was officially confirmed that gay relationships would be possible in the game among player characters.
The Town of Light	Renée	Lesbian	Renée, the protagonist of The Town of Light, develops a romantic relationship with another patient, Amara.
The Walking Dead: A New Frontier	Javier Garcia	Bisexual	Near the end of the game, the player can flirt with Paul Monroe (A.k.a. Jesus). The lead writer for the final episode later confirmed Javier's bisexuality in a reply to a blog post.
The Walking Dead: Michonne	Jonas and Zachary	Gay	Jonas and Zachary are a gay couple who first appeared in the first episode
The Walking Dead: Michonne	Paige	Lesbian	Paige has feelings for her friend Samantha

=== 2017 ===
Title	Character(s)	Identity	Notes
A Normal Lost Phone	Sam	Bisexual trans woman	Main character and owner of the titular lost phone. She is a young transgender woman who hides her gender identity from her bigoted parents and seeks help from an online trans support group.
Agents of Mayhem	Stephanie "Friday" Albright	Lesbian	In a romantic relationship with Janel Braddock.
Agents of Mayhem	Janel Braddock	Lesbian	In a romantic relationship with Janel Braddock.
Destiny 2	Devrim Kay	Gay	Devrim, an NPC and ally to the player character, can mention through idle dialogue that he misses spending time with a man named Mark. Gideon Emery, Devrim's voice actor, confirmed that Devrim is gay and Mark was his boyfriend.
Destiny 2	Eramis	Lesbian	Eramis is the leader of one group of the Fallen/Eliskni alien factions opposed to the Vanguard, introduced in the Beyond Light expansion. Her lore states that she was married to another female Eliskni and had children with her.
Destiny 2	Mara Sov	Bisexual	The Queen of the Awoken, Mara has said to have had romantic relationships with Lord Shaxx and with Sjur Eido, a woman.
Destiny 2	Nimbus	Non-binary	A character introduced in the Lightfall expansion shown to be nonbinary as part of a Bungie celebration of LGBTQ rights.
Destiny 2	The Drifter	Pansexual	The Drifter has shown romantic interests in multiple characters, and was indicated to be pansexual by Bungie.
Dream Daddy: A Dad Dating Simulator	The player character	Trans man	The player character can be transgender, as there is an option when creating the character to have a chest binder.
Dream Daddy: A Dad Dating Simulator	Damien Bloodmarch	Trans man	In the series, Damien, a gothic character, references his trans identity.
Hollow Knight	The Hollow Knight	Agender	The Knight and their siblings are genderless beings.
Hollow Knight	The Knight	Agender	The Knight and their siblings are genderless beings.
Hollow Knight	The Lost Kin	Agender	The Knight and their siblings are genderless beings.
Hollow Knight	The Vessels	Agender	The Knight and their siblings are genderless beings.
Nekojishi	Lin Tian-Liao	Gay	Liao is a college freshman who suddenly discovers he has the ability to see spirits, that he can romance.
Nier: Automata	6O	Lesbian	6O mentions in a conversation with 2B that her crush rejected her, and implies that her crush was another female android.
Nier: Automata	11B	Lesbian	16D is a female android. At some point, she reveals that she was in a relationship with her mentor 11B, another female android.
Nier: Automata	16D	Lesbian	16D is a female android. At some point, she reveals that she was in a relationship with her mentor 11B, another female android.
Night in the Woods	"Bombshell"	Lesbian	A girl Mae meets at Jackie's party. The two flirt with each other, though Mae leaves the party without getting her name. Her sexuality was confirmed on Scott Benson's CuriousCat account, though his account has since seemingly been deleted, though accounts of it can still be found.
Night in the Woods	Margaret "Mae" Borowski	Pansexual	The main character, Mae Borowski, is pansexual.
Night in the Woods	Angus Delaney	Gay	Greggory "Gregg" Lee and Angus are a gay couple.
Night in the Woods	Jackie	Trans woman	Bea's friend Jackie is a trans woman.
Night in the Woods	Greggory "Gregg" Lee	Gay	In a romantic relationship with Angus Delaney.
Prey	Abigail Foy	Lesbian	In a romantic relationship with Danielle Sho.
Prey	Mikhaila Ilyushin	Lesbian or bisexual	In a romantic relationship with Morgan Yu.
Prey	Danielle Sho	Lesbian	In a romantic relationship with Abigail Foy.
Prey	Morgan Yu	Lesbian or bisexual	The player can choose the gender of the protagonist, who is established to be in a relationship with Mikhaila Ilyushin regardless of the former's gender.
South Park: The Fractured but Whole	Player character	Trans man	The player character can be a cisgender, transgender, or non-binary girl, boy, or child, but other characters often misgender the player character if they are transgender or non-binary.
South Park: The Fractured but Whole	Player character	Trans woman	The player character can be a cisgender, transgender, or non-binary girl, boy, or child, but other characters often misgender the player character if they are transgender or non-binary.
South Park: The Fractured but Whole	Player character	Non-binary	The player character can be a cisgender, transgender, or non-binary girl, boy, or child, but other characters often misgender the player character if they are transgender or non-binary.
Steven Universe: Save The Light	Ruby	Non-binary lesbian	Two sexless but feminine-presenting members of the Crystal Gems who have a romantic relationship with each other, and stay permanently fused to form Garnet. The co-executive producer of Steven Universe, Ian Jones-Quartey, has confirmed that, according to human standards and terminology, calling Ruby and Sapphire non-binary, feminine-presenting lesbians would be "a fair assessment". This is reflected in this game.
Steven Universe: Save The Light	Sapphire	Non-binary lesbian	Two sexless but feminine-presenting members of the Crystal Gems who have a romantic relationship with each other, and stay permanently fused to form Garnet. The co-executive producer of Steven Universe, Ian Jones-Quartey, has confirmed that, according to human standards and terminology, calling Ruby and Sapphire non-binary, feminine-presenting lesbians would be "a fair assessment". This is reflected in this game.
Steven Universe: Save The Light	Pearl	Non-binary lesbian	In the Steven Universe episode "We Need to Talk", it is very apparent that Pearl, a female-presenting non-binary Gem, is attracted to another Gem named Rose Quartz, her now-deceased leader. Her feelings are later confirmed romantic in nature and reciprocated by Rose. This is also reflected in the video game.
Tacoma	Natalie Kuroshenko	Lesbian	Natalie and Roberta are a married couple.
Tacoma	Roberta Williams	Lesbian	Natalie and Roberta are a married couple.
Tacoma	Andrew Dagyab	Gay or bisexual	Andrew is married to a man.

=== 2018 ===
Title	Character(s)	Identity	Notes
BattleTech	Player character	Non-binary	While creating their character, the player can choose they / them pronouns.
Celeste	Madeline	Trans woman	Cutscenes in Celeste: Farewell hints that Madeline is a trans woman; this was later confirmed by developer Maddy Thorson.
Pathfinder: Kingmaker	Octavia & Regongar	Bisexual	Octavia (female half-elf) and Regongar (male half-orc) are a bisexual polyamorous couple. Player character, regardless of their gender, can romance either or both of them.
Pathfinder: Kingmaker	Nyrissa	Bisexual	Nyrissa is a nymph and the main antagonist that can be romanced by player character of any gender under certain circumstances.
The Missing: J.J. Macfield and the Island of Memories	J.J. Macfield	Trans woman	J.J. Macfield is the protagonist of The Missing, and her identity as a trans woman is slowly revealed through the game's story.
The Red Strings Club	Brandeis and Donovan	Gay	Dialogue between player characters Brandeis and Donovan indicates that they have a romantic relationship.
The Red Strings Club	Larissa	Trans woman	It is revealed that Larissa is transgender when the player needs to use her deadname to solve a puzzle, a decision that was met with controversy.
Wandersong	Ash	Non-binary	Ash is referred to with they/them pronouns in-game and has been confirmed as non-binary by the developer.
Your Royal Gayness	Player character	Gay	The player takes the role of a secretly gay prince, and has to fend off the advances of various princesses.
Your Royal Gayness	Other princes	Gay	The player takes the role of a secretly gay prince, and has to fend off the advances of various princesses.

=== 2019 ===
Title	Character(s)	Identity	Notes
13 Sentinels: Aegis Rim	Takatoshi Hijiyama	Bisexual	Takatoshi falls in love with a girl named Kiriko Douji, who was actually Tsukasa Okino, who was in a feminine disguise to be able to pass as a cisgender girl in the 1940s. Tsukasa was assigned male at birth, seems to identify as non-binary, and switches pronouns depending on the safety of the time period. After finding this out, Takatoshi remains interested in Tsukasa.
Apex Legends	Makoa Gibraltar	Gay	His character profile mentions a boyfriend.
Apex Legends	Bloodhound	Non-binary	According to Respawn's Community Manager Jay Frechette, Bloodhound is non-binary.
Apex Legends	Loba	Bisexual	Senior writer Tom Castillo confirmed on Twitter that Loba is bisexual.
Apex Legends	Fuse	Pansexual	Lead writer at Respawn Entertainment Amanda Doiron confirms that Fuse is pansexual.
Apex Legends	Valkyrie	Lesbian	Writer Tom Casiello and the character's voice actor confirmed in an interview hosted by MoonLiteWolf that Valkyrie is a lesbian.
Apex Legends	Catalyst	Trans woman	Catalyst, aka Tressa Crystal Smith, is the first trans woman in Apex Legends. According to lead writer Ashely Reed, the design team knew from the start of Catalyst's development that they wanted their next Legend to be a trans woman.
Apex Legends	Seer	Pansexual	Lead writer Amanda Doiron confirms that Seer is pansexual.
Disco Elysium	Harrier "Harry" DuBois	Possibly bisexual	Harrier "Harry" DuBois is the protagonist of Disco Elysium. He was previously in a relationship with a woman named Dora but has lost most of his memories of her and any other relationships he may have had. During the events of the game, Harry meets a gay man known only as the Smoker on the Balcony whom he finds himself drawn to and flustered by. Subsequent conversations with the smoker and with his inner monologue can lead to Harry expressing interest in exploring the gay scene. The game's creators reinforced this curiosity, posting a scene of Kim and Harry kissing on Valentine's Day 2023.
Disco Elysium	Kim Kitsuragi	Gay	Kim is Harry's police partner during the events of Disco Elysium. Completing the "Homo-Sexual Underground" Thought will unlock an optional conversation with Kim where Harry can ask him directly if he is gay, and he responds in the affirmative. The game's creators reinforced this posting a scene of Kim and Harry kissing on Valentine's Day 2023.
GreedFall	Vasco	Bisexual	Vasco and Siora can be romanced regardless of the player character's gender, while the other characters are heterosexual.
GreedFall	Siora	Bisexual	Vasco and Siora can be romanced regardless of the player character's gender, while the other characters are heterosexual.
Knife Sisters	Leo	Non-binary	Leo, who is nonbinary and uses they/them pronouns, is the protagonist and player character of the game.
Later Alligator	Tin Lizzy	Lesbian	She is in a relationship with Joanie. Her sexuality is specified as such by the developers
The Outer Worlds	Parvati Holcomb	Biromantic asexual	Parvati is a crew and party member on the Player's ship "The Unreliable" acting as the ship's engineer. She expresses professional and later romantic interest in the Chief engineer of the Colony Ship "Ground Breaker", Junlei. Her Companion quest results in the two of them becoming a couple. Narrative designer Kate Dollarhyde, an asexual woman who is also bi-romantic, was excited they were inheriting this character, saying she was glad to "bring that personal experience to the audience", making her character different from other companions.

== See also ==
- List of video games with LGBTQ characters
- List of video games with LGBTQ characters: 2020s
