= Clove (disambiguation) =

A clove is the aromatic dried flower bud of a tree in the family Myrtaceae.

Clove may also refer to:

- Garlic clove, a segment of a bulb (head) of garlic
- Clove (weight), an old English unit of weight
- Clove (ship), a ship captained by John Saris
- Clove Brook, a stream in New Jersey, US
- Clove, a fictional character in The Hunger Games
- Clove, a video game character in Valorant

== See also ==
- Clove hitch, a kind of knot
- Clove cigarette, Indonesian cigarettes made from tobacco, cloves and flavoring
- Clover
- Clovis
