= Richard Cocks =

British trader (1565–1624)

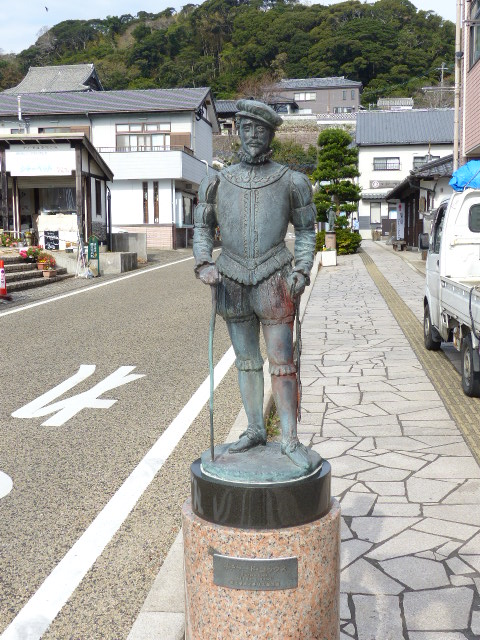
Memorial statue of Richard Cocks in Hirado, Japan

Richard Cocks (1565–1624) was the head of the British East India Company trading post in Hirado, Japan, between 1613 and 1623, from its creation until its bankruptcy and closure.

== Life in France ==
He was baptised on 20 January 1565 at St Chad's, Seighford, Staffordshire, the fifth of the seven children of Robert Cocks of Stallbrook, yeoman, and his wife, Helen. He was apprenticed in London and became a member of the Clothworkers' Company. He moved to Bayonne in Southern France. In 1605, he was recruited by Sir Thomas Wilson as a spy, where he monitored the movements of English Roman Catholic exiles who passed through the region on their way to Spain. After losing a large amount of money to a Portuguese con artist, he could no longer pay his English creditors and returned home in disgrace. His reputation at home was ruined and he decided to leave England to start a new life in Japan.

== Life in Japan ==
Cocks sailed to Japan on the ship Clove as part of the first English expedition to the country, led by John Saris, which left England in 1611 and arrived in Hirado on 12 June 1613. Cocks was appointed chief factor of the East India Company at Hirado on 26 November 1613, shortly before Saris' departure for England. The surviving documents of the trading post (letters, accounts and journals) are a unique source of first-hand accounts of early modern Japan through secular Western eyes.

During his time in Japan, he wrote a very detailed diary, relating the history of the trading post, the situation of Japan at the time, and the activities of English merchants in Japan, among whom was also the English pilot and samurai, retainer to Tokugawa Ieyasu, William Adams, with whom he wrote he had visited the residence of Imperial Fleet Admiral Mukai Shogen Tadakatsu, under orders from the Shogun, to discuss the possibility, required logistics, and outcome of an invasion of the Spanish Philippines in 1616. Cocks was close to Adams, inheriting many of his prized possessions upon his death in 1620, and later paying financial support for two children claimed to be Adams'.

In the spring of 1617, Cocks paid £1,500 to Chinese merchant Li Dan in an ill-fated attempt to open trade with China. This incident led to harsh criticism of Cocks' mismanagement within the Company, but he remained in charge of the Hirado factory.

By 1618 he had established trade with China and Cambodia.

In the spring of 1622, Cocks was ordered to return to Batavia after Richard Fursland, the president of the Council of Defence at the Company, received reports of extravagant feasting and womanizing among the English traders in Hirado. Cocks ignored the order, but thereafter, Fursland sent Joseph Cockram to Hirado in the summer of 1623 to audit the Company's accounts. Cockram discovered a massive deficit in the accounts, which led Fursland to close the factory at Hirado. Cocks and the other English traders departed Japan on the Bull on Christmas Eve, 1623.

== Death at sea ==
After the trading post was closed in 1623, the East India Company in Batavia decided to send Cocks to England for a final judgment as to whether he should be punished as a criminal for his mismanagement. Cocks sailed for England on the Anne Royal but died and was buried at sea on 27 March 1624 in the southern Indian Ocean.
