= Venture (Overwatch) =

Fictional character in the Overwatch franchise

- Overwatch character
- Venture's appearance in Overwatch 2
- First game: Overwatch 2 (2024)
- Designed by: Kejun Wang
- Voiced by: Valeria Rodriguez

In-universe information
- Gender: Non-binary (they/them pronouns)
- Class: Damage
- Origin: Nova Scotia, Canada
- Nationality: Mexican Canadian

Venture is the alias of Sloan Cameron, a character in the Overwatch media franchise. They first appeared in Overwatch 2, a first-person hero shooter video game developed by Blizzard Entertainment, being added to game's playable character roster in 2024. Conceived as a miner character, senior concept artist Keiun Wang went through multiple concepts before narrative designer Miranda Mover suggested a swashbuckling archeologist, which led to creating a "daring explorer with a big drill". They are a Mexican-Canadian person from Nova Scotia, Canada, and are voiced by Valeria Rodriguez.

Venture is the first non-binary character in the Overwatch franchise. The design process for them had input from multiple people at Blizzard as well as a queer fashion company. Venture has been highlighted by video game writers for their non-binary identity and representation. Blizzard received criticism over having a limited number of skins, particularly compared to East Asian characters, resulting in accusations of favoritism. Digital culture anthropologist Adrian Lugo suggested that, due to Overwatch not being a story-focused game, having few skins makes it more difficult for players to connect to Venture.

== Conception and development ==
Both Venture and their drill went through several designs during the planning process.

The early concept for the characters was "Miner", strictly defined as someone that could dig underground and as a result required a huge drill. Senior concept artist Kejun Wang went through multiple ideas and weapon combinations, including some that involved an exosuit and others that used sound-based drills. Narrative designer Miranda Moyer suggested a swashbuckling archeologist, an idea the development team quickly took a liking to and built around, combining several elements of Wang's early concepts to create "a daring explorer with a big drill". Particularly, a longer coat and a heavy backpack were added as they felt these elements were unique to Venture's identity, but also helped make the character's silhouette more distinct.

The drill required additional work on its own, as when attempting to create rough models of the design to test it in a 3D environment, they found the concepts did not translate well for a first person perspective. As a result, they refined it to have a more conical shape they felt would be immediately recognizable during gameplay, while the additional moving parts were mapped out by collaborating with other artists. Venture's means of holding it was meant to resemble someone riding a motorcycle. They felt this aesthetic worked well due to how loud the weapon was, and leaned more into it by adding flame decals to the side.

They chose to make Venture non-binary with they/them pronouns, something the character's gameplay designer Jessie Yang, themselves non-binary, described as long overdue. To better understand how to approach the concept, Yang encouraged another non-binary developer at Blizzard to give a quick presentation, illustrating that such characters often had no set archetype. Narrative designer Miranda Moyer chose to focus on developing the character's personality as an archeologist in Overwatch's setting, wanting them to be someone "daring, passionate, and unabashedly themselves". During this process, other LGBTQ developers at the company were also asked for their input, while according to Moyer a queer fashion company was consulted to try and ensure the character would be well received by the public.

=== Design ===
Like other Overwatch characters, Venture received skins, unlockable cosmetic items to change their in-game appearance. Of particular note, the "Monarch" skin was released as part of the game's 2024 Pride Month celebration, changing the character's color scheme to match those of the non-binary gender flag.

== Appearances ==
Venture, real name Sloan Cameron, is a non-binary Mexican-Canadian archaeologist from Nova Scotia, Canada, and a member of the archaeological research group known as the Wayfinder Society. In the game's lore, they seek to find an artifact and discover it being stolen by the terrorist group Talon. They manage to defeat Talon's operatives and recover it. They later appear in the short story "The Deep-Sea Deception", working alongside scientist Lifeweaver to recover artifacts from the bottom of the ocean. Venture is voiced by Valeria Rodriguez.

In Overwatch, Venture is classified as a Damage-class character, designed to provide a more offensive role in team compositions. Their weapon is a massive mining drill called a Smart Excavator, though instead of being a contact weapon it fires a seismic charge projectile that explodes after travelling a short distance. Venture also has two passive abilities in the form of "Clobber", which increases the damage of their close-range melee attacks, and "Explorer's Resolve", which grants a small damage-absorbing shield when using their abilities.

Venture also has several abilities that require activation, though have a "cooldown" period after use and are unable to be used again during that duration. "Burrow" allows them to travel under the playable area for a short period of time, during which they are completely invulnerable to attacks. Upon emerging, they will deal damage to enemies around them. Meanwhile, "Drill Dash" charges forward with the drill outward, damaging enemies while knocking them back, and can be used to dash upward as well. Lastly their Ultimate ability, "Tectonic Shock", needs to be charged before use. The ability charges slowly during the course of gameplay, and can be charged faster through damage dealt to the enemy team or healing provided to allies. Once full the ability can be activated to unleash shockwaves that damages enemies.

== Promotion and reception ==
Venture was revealed at Blizzcon 2023, and later made a playable character as part of the April 2024 Season 10 patch, being playable during an open test period in the prior month. In a collaboration with Disc City Entertainment Co., select cafes in Japan served dishes inspired by the character and others in the Overwatch cast.

Venture's debut was well received, particularly by players that appreciated additional representation in the game's roster. Meanwhile, Kotaku's Kenneth Shepard commented how players had come to regard Venture's chipped tooth in their concept art coupled with their archeologist background as a sign the character ate rocks, and drew significant fan art around this concept as a meme. In June 2024, fans of the character purchased televised screen space in Times Square, New York City to showcase memes and their affection towards the character.

In an article examining Overwatch's handling of LGBTQ representation, Jade King of The Gamer described Venture and fellow character Lifeweaver as a step in the right direction for Blizzard's representation of queer characters in the game, described past efforts as "all bark and no bite". By comparison, they appreciated that Venture was direct and proud of their identity. King further stated that while the character was androgynous in appearance, they were also "still packed with personality from their clothes to their facial expressions", illustrating an ideal of being who one wanted to be.

Journalist Bonnie Qu in an article for eSports group Team Liquid's website discussed Venture in the scope of other non-binary characters that were recently introduced in competitive gaming. In this manner, they observed how Venture compared to characters from other games such as Valorant's Clove or Rainbow Six Siege's Sens, and how all the characters in question varied from one another as developers tried to define what represented a non-binary identity visually. They further felt that properly illustrating a non-binary identity relied less on stereotyping but on diversity in character design, and that "when done right" bad faith arguments against such would often sound ridiculous, citing in Venture's case how some critics could not actually decide what gender to misgender the character as.

However, media outlets observed Venture seemed to receive little additional support from the developers in the form of in-game cosmetics beyond simple skins or additional lore content upon released, elements that every previous character in Overwatch had received. As time went on, this lack of support became more noticeable, with Shepard stating the fandom seemed to be providing more support than Blizzard Entertainment themselves. Though later skins were eventually released, they were in a diminished capacity compared to the rest of the game's cast, and despite the promise of additional content by the developers accusations arose towards Blizzard of "playing favorites" by favoring more popular members of the roster, particularly East Asian-themed characters.

California State University, Long Beach digital culture anthropologist Adrian Lugo, in an interview with esports.gg, discussed Venture's lack of skins. In context, Lugo observed that because Overwatch was not a story-based game, fans often purchased or collected skins as a means to connect with characters and engage with the fandom more easily. However, while Venture's introduction had significant impact, due to the lack of such content players found other avenues to express their appreciation, at the cost of having a harder time to interact with the fandom. As a result, not only did players feel Venture was neglected, but they proposed that the character's release as the title's first non-binary character may have been mostly performative on the part of the development team.
