= John Saris =

British sailor (c. 1580–1643)

John Saris (c. 1580–1643) was an English sailor and merchant best known for leading the first English trade expedition to Japan, the voyage of the Clove from 1611 to 1614. He served as chief factor of the East India Company missions in Bantam, Indonesia and Hirado, Japan.

== Early life ==
Saris was born to a family in South Yorkshire in 1579 or 1580. His father died in 1588.

== Career ==
=== Bantam expedition ===
Saris jointed an English fleet bound for Bantam on 25 March 1604, and arrived in Indonesia on 24 July 1605. He remained there after the leader of the expedition, Henry Middleton, returned to England in October 1605. Saris kept a diary and sent reports back to the East India Company, and in 1608 was promoted to chief factor of the English mission. Augustine Spalding took over this role in October 1609, and Saris returned to England on 10 May 1610.

During this first voyage to Asia, Saris took an interest in Japanese erotic art and began accumulating a private collection of woodblock prints.

=== Japan expedition ===
Saris's experiences in Indonesia came to the attention of Sir Thomas Smythe, who agreed to have Saris lead a fact-finding voyage to Japan. The English had intentions to reach Japan since the Muscovy Company sought a Northeast Passage in 1580. William Adams landed in Japan in April 1600 as the navigator of the Dutch ship Liefde (Love), had entered the service of the Japanese shogun Tokugawa Ieyasu, and had recently made contact with the English, creating an opportunity to open trading relations. The diaries of Saris suggest that he was unaware of Adams' existence until he returned to England.

Saris departed England on the Clove on 18 April 1611, reaching Table Bay in South Africa on 1 August, the Comoros on 26 October, and Socotra on 16 February 1612. He rendezvoused with Sir Middleton in the Red Sea in April 1612, where their combined fleet spent several weeks engaging in forcible trade with Indian junks. Saris left the Red Sea in August and arrived in Bantam on 24 October 1612.

Saris departed Bantam for Japan on 15 January 1613. The Clove arrived in Hirado on 12 June 1613 and was the first English ship to reach Japan.

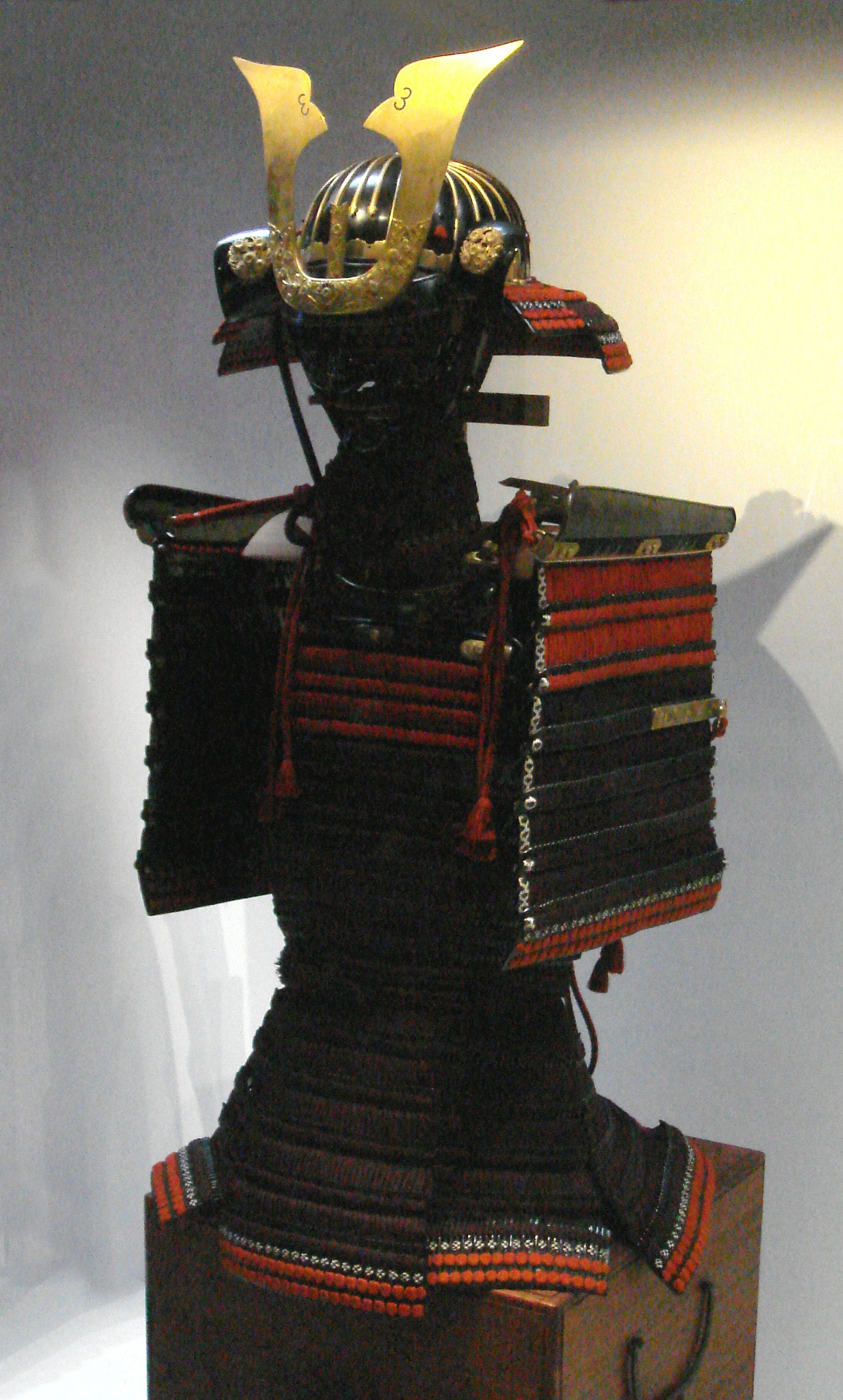
One of the two Japanese suits of armour offered by Tokugawa Hidetada to John Saris for King James I in 1613, now in the Tower of London.

Adams, who had become the shogun's advisor on foreign affairs, joined Saris on 29 July and helped to make arrangements for meetings with the retired shogun Ieyasu, who still held power, and also his son, the de facto Shōgun Tokugawa Hidetada. They departed Hirado on 7 August, travelled to Osaka and Fushimi by boat, and thence to the home of Ieyasu at Sunpu Castle, where they arrived on 6 September.

Saris was partly welcomed in Japan because of the astonishing present he had brought. This was a telescope, described as 'silver-gilt' and very large. It was the first telescope ever to leave Europe, and the first to be made as a royal-level gift. It is not extant.

They then departed for Edo on 12 September, arriving on 14 September and meeting with Shogun Hidetada on 17 September. On the 21st, Saris and Adams travelled to nearby Uraga, which Adams and Ieyasu had both suggested as the main port for the English to use. However, Saris decided to place the English factory on Hirado, where the Dutch were already trading with some success. Despite its much greater distance from Edo and Osaka, it would save an extra leg of sailing along dangerous coasts.

Saris returned to Sunpu from 29 September to 9 October, and received a Red Seal trading license for the East India Company at the end of this trip, as well as a letter from Ieyasu to James I. He returned to Hirado on 6 November.

While at Sunpu, Adams received Ieyasu's permission to leave Japan and made arrangements to return to England with Saris on the Clove, but at some point he decided to remain in Japan, and Saris arranged to hire Adams to work for the Company at Hirado.

=== Return to England ===
Saris left Hirado on the Clove on 5 December 1613, leaving Richard Cocks in charge of the Hirado operation. The Clove docked at Bantam from 3 January to 13 February 1614, and then sailed directly back to England.

He returned to Plymouth in September 1614 and remained at anchor there for more than six weeks, raising suspicions that he was offloading secret cargo. During October, the Company repeatedly debated ordering Saris back to London, but decided on 25 October that "his presence on board was necessary to keep the crew in order, and that it would be a pity to give him so tedious a journey at the end of a long voyage."

Saris then travelled to London in mid-November, where he persuaded the East India Company directors to authorize another trading mission to Japan. Saris also brought back Ieyasu's reciprocal gifts for King James, in thanks for the telescope, which were stunning paintings, and from the shogun himself, two suits of armour (which are extant).

On 13 December, after an audit of the ship's cargo, the Company concluded that Saris had engaged in "private trade" on the voyage and appointed a committee to "look into Saris's commission." Shortly thereafter, Thomas Smythe discovered Saris's erotic art collection from Japan. On 10 January 1615, he orchestrated a public burning of the collection outside the offices of the East India Company. This incident publicly disgraced Saris and ended his career.

== Later life, death and legacy ==
Shortly after leaving the Company in 1615, Saris married Anne, daughter of the wealthy London merchant William Megges, granddaughter (on her mother's side) of Sir Thomas Cambell, Lord Mayor in 1609–10. She died in the 8th year of their marriage without issue, on 21 February 1623, aged 29 probably in childbirth. Saris never remarried.

Saris then moved into a fine mansion near the Thames at Fulham, called Goodriches, which was behind All Saints Church in Fulham. It was pulled down in 1750, and Sir William Fowell's Alms-houses now stand upon its site. Here he lived quietly until the winter of 1643, when he died on December 11, and was buried on the 19th, a fee of 2 shillings and 6 pennies being paid to the churchwardens "for the burial." His monument, a large black stone in the floor to the right of the altar, may still be seen in All Saints Church in Fulham, though it is barely legible and partially hidden by the choir-stalls. It bears the arms of himself and his wife and reads:

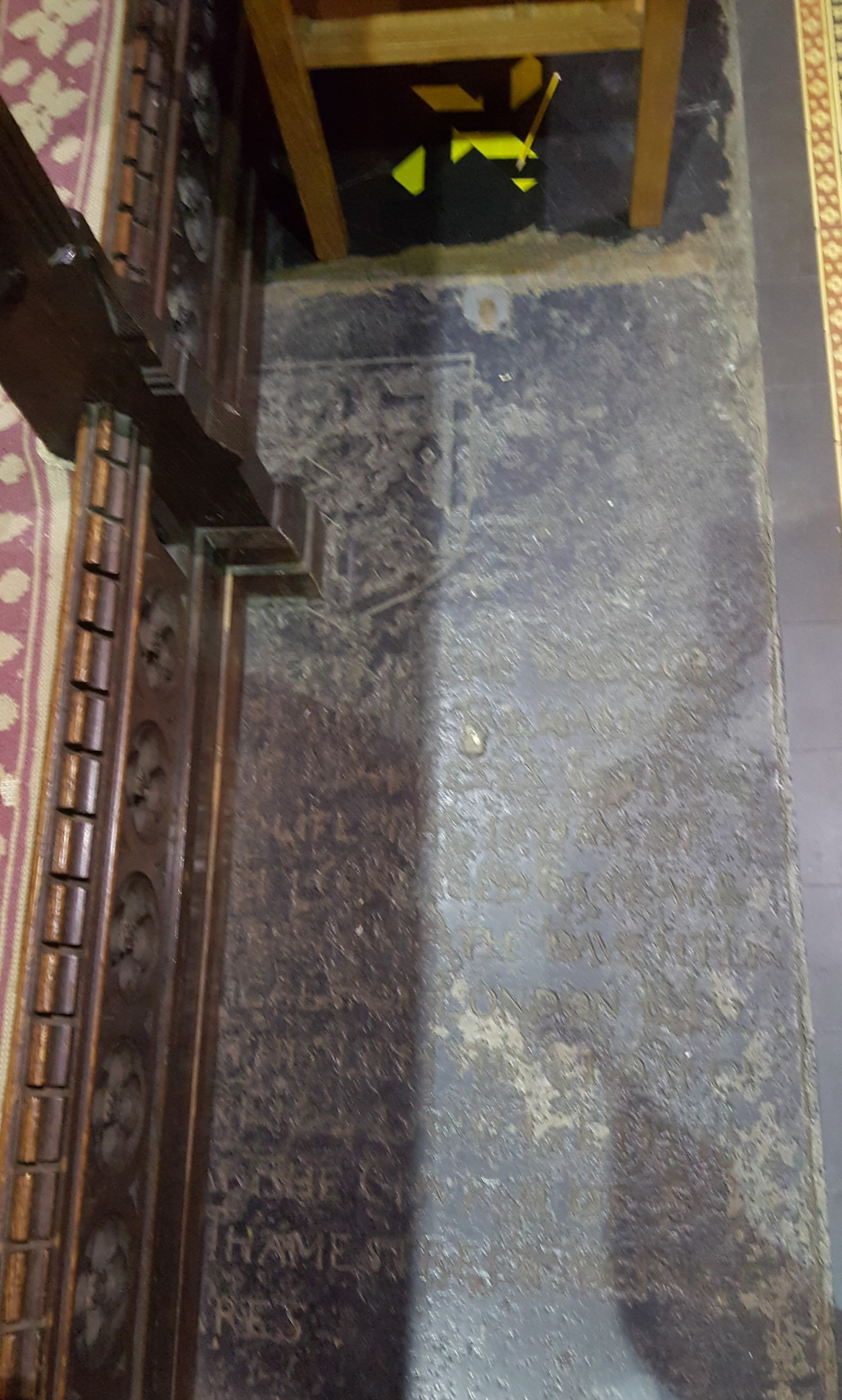
Tombstone of John Saris

HERE LYETH INTERRED THE BODY OF

CAPTAYN JOHN SARIS OF FVLHAM IN THE COVNTY OF MIDDLESEX ESQ. HE DEPARTED THIS LIFE THE 11 DAY OF DECEM Ao DNI 1643, AGED 63 YEARS. HE HAD TO WIFE ANNE THE DAVGHTER OF WILLIAM MIGGES OF LONDON ESQ. SHE DEPARTED THIS LIFE THE 2ND DAY OF FEBRVARY Ao DNI 1622 AND LIETH BV RYD IN THE PARISHE CHVRCH OF ST BOTOPLH IN THAMES STREET BEING

AGED 21 YEARES

In his will (a copy of which is in Somerset House), dated 18 April 1643, which was proved 2 October 1646, he left the bulk of his property to the children of his half-brother George, who had died in 1631. To the poor of Fulham parish, however, he left thirty pounds, to be expended in two-penny loaves, which were to be distributed to thirty poor people every Sunday, after sermon, until the amount was exhausted.

His unusual surname is a variant spelling of the more common Sayers.

The English mission in Japan ultimately failed, due in large part to the fact that the English came to Japan to sell their finest domestic product, which was woollen cloth, but it tended to rot en route. English efforts to develop a trade relationship with China at this time failed as well, and so the Hirado factory was abandoned 'temporarily' ten years later, in 1623.

Saris's journals were published in 1900, as The Voyage of Captain John Saris to Japan, 1613, edited by Ernest M. Satow.

== See also ==
- Anglo-Japanese relations
- List of Westerners who visited Japan before 1868

== Bibliography ==
- Elison, George (1985). "Saris, John." Kodansha Encyclopedia of Japan. Tokyo: Kodansha Ltd.
- The Voyage of Captain John Saris to Japan, 1613, edited by Sir Ernest M. Satow, ISBN 1-135-38300-6
- "Historical Overview" 2015 Japan 400, 400th Anniversary of Japan-British Relations
- Rogers, Hiromi (2016). Anjin – The Life and Times of Samurai William Adams. Folkestone: Renaissance Books.
- Screech, Timon (2020). The Shogun's Silver Telescope: God, Art and Money in the English Quest for Japan. Oxford: Oxford University Press
