= Symmetra =

Fictional character in the 2016 video game Overwatch

- Overwatch character
- Symmetra's appearance in Overwatch
- First appearance: Overwatch (2016)
- Created by: Jeff Kaplan
- Designed by: Arnold Tsang; Roman Kenney & Ben Zhang (equipment)
- Voiced by: Anjali Bhimani

In-universe information
- Class: Support (original); Damage (2018 rework)
- Nationality: Indian

Symmetra, full name Satya Vaswani, a character who first appeared in the 2016 video game Overwatch, a Blizzard Entertainment–developed first-person hero shooter, and the resulting franchise. Voiced by Anjali Bhimani, she makes later appearances in related literary media and the game's sequel, Overwatch 2. Conceived by Jeff Kaplan and designed by Arnold Tsang, the character was conceived due to a desire to include a classic fantasy wizard into the game's science fiction setting, expressed through her ability to create constructs from thin air using hard-light technology. A woman of Indian descent, she works for the Vishkar Corporation, protecting their interests while working to expand their influence despite her concerns about their intentions. Since the game's release she has appeared in various spinoff media related to the franchise, including comics and merchandise. Voicelines in the game suggests that she studied or worked alongside Lifeweaver during her time at the Vishkar Corporation.

Symmetra as a fictional character was mostly well received since her debut, albeit with some criticisms on how Blizzard handled her cultural aspects. The developers were heavily praised for their approach to how she is portrayed as a person on the autism spectrum, finding it a breath of fresh air compared to most pop-culture depictions and applauded for their subtle approach to the subject as just one of many character traits she has. Her gameplay in Overwatch however proved far more divisive, resulting in a rift in the player community as some assumed she was chosen by players to either grief or troll their teammates, resulting in Symmetra players receiving verbal abuse or attempts to ban them from the game. Said players argued in favor of her, countering that they enjoyed her strategic gameplay and saw her as a tactical choice in the team-based game.

== Conception and development ==
Symmetra's design changed significantly during development.

While working on a massive multiplayer online game concept for Blizzard Entertainment, developer Geoff Goodman suggested the idea of a large number of character classes for players to select, but with class specialization for each. Fellow developer Jeff Kaplan took this idea to heart, salvaging character concepts from Titan—a then-recently cancelled Blizzard project—and character artwork by artist Arnold Tsang for that project. Kaplan created an eight-page pitch for a first person shooter concept to propose the idea that included a series of proposed characters, among them a white woman called "Architect" clad in a yellow dress with exposed thighs, armed with a blaster and a three-pronged "arc welder" replacing her left hand on a cybernetic arm. The concept went through several revisions afterword before returning to the original proposal design as a base, renaming the character "Symmetra" and making her a woman of Indian descent. The design was one of the final twenty designs to be featured on the main pitch image for Prometheus, which once approved, later materialized into Overwatch.

Symmetra was one of the first twelve playable characters introduced upon the reveal of Overwatch at the November 2014 BlizzCon event. Blizzard let her backstory grow organically. They initially developed Symmetra's Vishkar Corporation storyline with little relation to the rest of Overwatch but later saw opportunities to expand while developing stories for other characters. Symmetra is also autistic, something originally only alluded to in a tie-in comic for the game until a fan asked Kaplan directly and he confirmed it in a letter response. The Overwatch developers also noted they wanted to not tokenize this particular trait, and instead emphasize their characters as an amalgam of traits. To this end, they added subtle commentary in her in-game dialogue expressing a desire for order and aversion to overstimulation. Overwatch 2's narrative designer Joshi Zhang fleshed out this aspect further in 2022, giving her voice lines that referenced her heightened sensory input and behaviors that allow her to stim.

=== Design ===
Standing 5 feet 7 inches (170 cm) tall, her design came from a desire to include a classic fantasy wizard into the game's science fiction setting. The Architect concept became a "Technomancer", a character meant to be able to summon technology out of thin air similar to a mage conjuring magic. To this end her finalized design incorporated a blue dress with gold trim and thigh-high black stockings to give the imagery of a mage's robes. When designing her weapon and equipment, artists Roman Kenney and Ben Zhang worked to keep a uniform feel between them. Particular consideration was given to her weapon, which was separated from her left arm and carried via a pistol grip in her right hand, while the palm of her left enabled her to summon hard-light constructs to complete the mage aesthetic. Originally Symmetra was intended to wear a large finned helmet covering the top of their head allowing her to view the world through augmented reality, with long black hair flowing behind said helmet. It was later shortened to a finned visor with transparent blue front to allow players to see her face, incorporating a maang tikka in its design while long earrings dangled from her ears. For Overwatch 2, her design was slightly altered, changing the rest to an angled sash across her torso and thigh atop a blue jacket, while her stockings were changed into pants with white highlights.

Like other Overwatch characters, Symmetra received skins, unlockable cosmetic items to change her in-game appearance. When developing them, they wanted to reference her scientific background, but also her role as a skilled architect at a major organization. Of particular note, the "Vishktar" skin presents her in a blue-and-white lab uniform with her hair tied into a bun and her visor front replaced with orange lenses. Her "Oasis" skin, on the other hand, was meant to represent the visual themes of the in-game city of Oasis, a scientific community located in Iraq. The "Devi" skin referenced her cultural background by referencing the Hindu god of the same name, giving her blue skin and an outfit that incorporated elements of another Hindu deity, Kali. This particular outfit drew backlash from Rajan Zed, a leader in the Hindu community, who felt it trivialized their religion by "letting players control her movements", and further claimed it was "creating confusion in the minds of [the] community about Devi by misrepresentation." Blizzard Entertainment did not provide a response to Zed's statements.

== Appearances ==
Satya Vaswani is an Indian woman introduced in the 2016 first-person shooter Overwatch. Trained since youth as an architect at the Vishkar Corporation, an India-based company that developed a "hard light" technology that allows for the construction of physical objects from light, she proved particular gifted with it and helped build a city out of such constructs. The corporation recognized her talent and giving her the codename "Symmetra" tasked her with expanding Vishkar's global reach. While she does so to help the greater good, there are times she doubts if the control and order she desires are best for humanity. Symmetra is voiced by Indian-American actor Anjali Bhimani, who at the time of casting was not aware the character was autistic. She stated "I loved that it was so lightly touched-on [...] Had they told me that earlier on, I think somewhere in the back of my mind, I would have given that more weight than necessarily would have been appropriate."

Her story is further fleshed out in the digital comic book series, appearing in Symmetra: A Better World, the fourth issue of the 2016 Overwatch tie-in comic book series. In it, she is tasked with helping Vishkar secure a deal to rebuild the slums of Rio de Janeiro, however the mayor favors a rival company. Symmetra infiltrates the company to try and find discrediting information, however after not finding any the building explodes much to her shock, burning down the nearby neighborhood. Months later Vishkar rebuilds the surrounding area, though Symmetra noticed no additional housing has been built, and expresses concerns about her company and their possible involvement in the destruction.

In 2020, Symmetra was featured in the short story Stone by Stone. In it, Symmetra helps with restoration efforts after development in Roshani, India causes a tremor that damages a religious statue in a nearby temple. She meets with the character Zenyatta, who teaches her about his religion and helps her understand the statue's significance. As a result, rather than replacing it she uses yellow hard-light to repair it, giving it a warm glow and pleasing all involved. She was later featured in the short story Rebuilding Ruins by Corinne Duyvis and Sangu Mandanna, set after the events of the game's "Zero Hour" storyline. It explores her past with the character Lifeweaver, as she visits him on behalf of Vishkar to ask for his help repairing Paris after an attack by the terrorist group Null Sector. While they talk, Null Sector attacks Lifeweaver's arcology, and the two work together to protect its residents.

=== Initial gameplay and redesigns ===
In Overwatch, Symmetra was originally classified as a Support-class character, meant to provide aid for her team. Her primary weapon, a Photon Projector, has two firing options. The primary fire will connect to an enemy while the trigger is held, doing continuous damage that increases the longer the beam connects. Enemies hit will remain tethered to the gun as long as they remain in the player's field of view. Meanwhile, the alternate fire option creates an explosive ball of energy. Holding the trigger will charge the shot, with the projectile size increased depending on the charge amount.

Symmetra also has several abilities that required activation, though the first two have a "cooldown" period after use and are unable to be used again during that duration. The first, "Sentry Turret", creates a small turret on the targeted surface that fires a low-damage laser at enemies. Up to six turrets can be placed at once, and each lasts until destroyed or replaced with additional placements after the sixth, with the oldest turret replaced first. The second ability, "Photon Shield", creates a shield on the targeted ally that lasts until it absorbs a fixed amount of damage. Lastly, her "Ultimate" ability, called "Teleporter", requires to be charged before use. The ability charges slowly during the course of gameplay, and can be charged faster through damage dealt to the enemy team. Once full the ability can be activated to place down a teleporter that allows for immediate travel between it and the team's spawn point. The teleporter will work six times before it removes itself, and while active, Symmetra's Ultimate will not recharge. During early development, the Teleporter ability required players to build a second teleporter for it to work; however, the team found this caused confusion in players and simplified it.

In December 2016, Blizzard made significant changes to Symmetra's gameplay, addressing the limited applicability of the Teleporter ability by providing an alternative Ultimate option: "Shield Generator", which when placed provides a shield to all allies in its area of effect for its duration. Teleporter was also modified, now restoring health and providing a personal shield when used. Lastly, her "Photon Shield" ability was replaced with a "Photon Barrier" ability that when activated propelled forward and shield allies until it either collided with a wall or took enough damage. A second rework came in June 2018, which increased the damage of her weapon's primary fire but removed its ability to auto-lock on targets, turrets would travel to their target area instead of being placed directly allowing them to damage enemies in their path, though the maximum number of turrets at one time was reduced. Lastly, her Teleporter was changed to a standard ability with a cooldown, and would be placed in front of her allowing for more strategic options. Lastly, Shield Generator was removed, while Photon Barrier took its place and was modified into a single, stationary shield wall that stretched across the entire map for fifteen seconds. Lastly, the character was reclassified as Damage-class, which in Overwatch 2 additionally provides her a short-term boost to her reload and movement speed after killing an enemy.

== Promotion and reception ==
To promote Overwatch and the character, she was one of twelve heroes showcased in a playable build of the game at the 2014 BlizzCon convention. Additional material includes a cosplay guide and promotional images themed around holidays, as well as a Funko Pop figure in 2017. In 2020, an in-game event was temporarily added to promote the release of the Stone by Stone short story, and allowed players to obtain in-game cosmetic items for Symmetra by completing certain challenges.

Overwatch's mishmashed portrayal of Indian culture has drawn criticism towards the character.

The character has been praised for her cultural representation, in particular by Victoria McNally for being a woman of Indian descent with a darker skintone, something she felt was uncommon in gaming, Andrew Lu of Digit magazine also praised her, stating her design "combines the best of traditional Indian clothing with a hi-tech twist". However, Saniya Ahmed for GameSpot noted that despite her presence in the game very little of her story or background was explored. Ahmed acknowledged that was partly due to the nature of the type of game Overwatch is, though felt in-game voice lines and external cinematics could still explore it further. Shahryar Rizvi in an article for Kill Screen cited her Devi skin of the game utilizing less historical accuracy and more cultural appropriation. The article noted that while depictions of Hindu deities tended to come in multiple depictions, the design was a mishmash of various gods. In particular most of the influence was cited as coming from Kali, with Rizvi expression their belief that a god most commonly associated with being "a vicious slayer seems out of character for Symmetra's lore as an architect and her in-game role". Ryan Khosravi in an article for Mic noted player criticism of Symmetra's cultural portrayal, and voiced their own stating "Overwatch falls back on lazy stereotypes and Western-imposed nationalities." He further stated that Indian culture was misunderstood, and expressed his desire to see the country's complex culture and history expressed through Symmetra's character and language as Blizzard had done better with other characters in the franchise. Guilherme Pedrosa Carvalho de Araújo and Gleislla Soares Monteiro in the Brazilian journal Revista Sistemas e Mídias Digitais on the other hand praised her cultural depiction, noting that the emphasis on her as a brilliant architect and lack of romantic attachment or focus on such as a departure from how Indian women are often portrayed in media.

Symmetra's autism and Blizzard's handling of it has been more widely praised by fans and the media like. Eurogamer's Laura Francis, herself a person of color on the autism spectrum, stating "Symmetra's inclusion in the game made me internally scream with huge delight." She added it was a refreshing change from portrayals such as The Big Bang Theory's Sheldon Cooper, and was extremely empowering to see a woman like her in a video game. Clinical psychologist Alexander Kriss in an article for Kill Screen praised Blizzard for their subtlety towards it early on, something they felt was rare on the subject of mental health in mainstream media, and avoided making her a "poster child" for portrayals of autism in gaming. He further added that by quietly placing the detail in the comic, "Blizzard makes this aspect of Symmetra's personality a part of who she is—without it reductionistically defining who she is." Additionally he appreciated that the character was not portrayed in a stereotypical fashion, having some expressed aspects but "'Rain Man' she is not", and it helped illustrate that there are varying degrees of autism and encouraged conversation regarding that instead of relying on one "typical" perception. Andrew McMillen of Wired voiced similar sentiments, noting that as of 2017 Symmetra was one of only ten characters in gaming with the condition. He further expressed that the subtle approach Blizzard had taken to the character prevented her from feeling like "another TV special-style example of spectrum disorder", and that Blizzard helped challenge cultural narratives toward neurodiversity.

As a game character in Overwatch, Symmetra was less warmly received, with USgamer and Kotaku noting her to traditionally be the least selected character. However this has caused some players to exclusively "main" the character, refusing to switch to another when playing. Such players built an online Reddit community around the concept, investing hundreds of hours of play for what they see as a "strategic" character that "requires critical thinking". Outside of this community, selecting Symmetra became associated with "griefing" and "trolling", which was worsened when actual trolling players adopted the character. Frustrated teammates increasingly accused Symmetra mains of bad faith, and resulted in some Symmetra players being banned from the game due to "poor teamwork" complaints filed by teammates. This reaction persisted even after the character's second redesign, with some critics seeing Symmetra as a joke that embodies aspects of Overwatch they loathe. People maining her however have countered that the game is not designed to highlight their contributions to team objectives, suggesting instead that other players misunderstand the value she brings to a team composition. In 2019 after additional changes were made to the game's team composition mechanics, sources such as Destructoid argued she had now become indispensable, and she later saw use for the first time in the game's eSports professional competitive play.
