= Clove (ship) =

British trade ship (1610–1623)

History
- Name: Clove
- Operator: British East India Company
- In service: 1610
- Out of service: 1623
- Fate: Laid up; rotten

General characteristics
- Type: Transport
- Tonnage: 527 GRT
- Crew: 89 (1610)

Clove was an East Indiaman vessel best known as the first British trade ship to make port in Japan. Captained by John Saris, she landed at Hirado, near Nagasaki, on 11 June 1613.

== First voyage (1611–1614) ==
Clove, and two other ships, set sail from the Downs, on 18 April 1611. She reached Madagascar, on 3 September 1611, Yemen, in March 1612, Ceylon, on 27 September 1612, Bantam, on 24 October 1612, and Tidore, on 11 March 1613, and finally passing Nagasaki, on 10 June, before arriving at Hirado, on 11 June.

Saris opened a trading post and factory in Hirado, which he passed on to his colleague Richard Cocks, when he left Japan, in December, that same year. Cocks would manage the post for roughly ten years before he was recalled by the British East India Company, on charges of misconduct; he died of illness shortly after leaving Japan.

Clove set sail from Hirado, on 5 December 1613, and reached Bantam, on 3 January 1614. Thereafter she sailed on 1 February and returned to Plymouth, on 27 September, bringing Saris, and his crew, back to England, after a voyage of more than three years.

== Second voyage (1615–1617) ==
Under the command of Master James Foster, who had previously sailed to Japan with Saris, Clove sailed from Gravesend to Bantam, the Cocos Keeling Islands, and Saint Helena. She returned to the Downs, on 20 June 1617.

== Third voyage (1618–1621) ==
Under the command of Master Richard Hunt, Clove sailed from the Downs to Bantam, Batavia, and Jambi.

== Fate ==
Clove was marked as laid up and rotten in 1623.

== Bibliography ==
- Frederic, Louis (2002). Japan Encyclopedia. Cambridge, Massachusetts: Harvard University Press.
