= List of video games with LGBTQ characters: 2020s =

The following is a list of confirmed video games with gay, lesbian, bisexual, or transgender characters, including any others falling under the LGBTQ umbrella term, in the 2020s.

== 2020 ==
Title	Character(s)	Classification	Notes
Bokuhime Project	Hiyu Shinosaki	Lesbian	Hiyu, a supporting character attending the same school as the protagonist, is attracted to women.
Bugsnax	Elizabert "Lizbert" Megafig	Lesbian	The missing explorer Grumpus named Elizabert "Lizbert" Megafig is in a relationship with the doctor Eggabell Batternugget. Eggabell is voiced by bisexual voice actress Fryda Wolff.
Bugsnax	Eggabell Batternugget	Lesbian	The missing explorer Grumpus named Elizabert "Lizbert" Megafig is in a relationship with the doctor Eggabell Batternugget. Eggabell is voiced by bisexual voice actress Fryda Wolff.
Bugsnax	Snorpy Fizzlebean	Gay	Chandlo's boyfriend; doesn't realize the two have been dating for years.
Bugsnax	Chandlo Funkbun	Bisexual	Snorpy's boyfriend; confirms their relationship with a kiss.
Bugsnax	Floofty Fizzlebean	Non-binary	Floofty is non-binary and uses they/them pronouns. They are voiced by non-binary voice actor Casey Mongillo.
Bugsnax	Wiggle Wigglebottom	Pansexual	While never explicitly shown in the game, it was confirmed on the Bugsnax AMA that Wiggle is pan.
Call of Duty: Black Ops Cold War	Player character	Non-binary (optional)	The Campaign mode offers four gender options for the player character: male, female, non-binary, and "classified." Before the game's release, the non-binary option was absent from trailers and promotional screenshots, which was met with mixed reception.
Cyberpunk 2077	V	Transgender or non-binary (optional), Bisexual	The character creator allows V to be transgender or non-binary. Male V can romance Kerry or Panam, while female V can romance Judy or River.
Cyberpunk 2077	Judy Alvarez	Lesbian	Judy can enter a relationship with V only if she has a feminine voice and body type.
Cyberpunk 2077	Meredith Stout	Bisexual	Meredith can have a sexual encounter with V regardless of voice and body type.
Cyberpunk 2077	Kerry Eurodyne	Bisexual	R. Talsorian Games, the creators of the tabletop RPG that the game's based on, confirmed on Twitter that Kerry is bisexual.
Cyberpunk 2077	Claire Russell	Transgender woman	Claire is stated to be trans in her in-game bio, and references having transition related surgery in a conversation scene.
Deadly Premonition 2: A Blessing in Disguise	Lena Dauman	Trans woman	A transgender woman, Lena is deadnamed and misgendered by the game's main character. The game's director apologized for the scene, and an update to the game removed some, but not all, of the offending dialogue.
Granblue Fantasy Versus	Ladiva	Trans woman	Ladiva is a wrestler, a "muscular fighter with a prominent goatee", and one of the game's multiple playable characters.
Granblue Fantasy Versus	Katalina	Bisexual	Katalina is the loyal bodyguard of Lyria, one of the main characters of the series, and part of the default roster of playable characters. She shows affection and secretly harbors feelings for the character Vira, who is openly in love with Katalina.
Granblue Fantasy Versus	Cagliostro	Trans woman	Cagliostro is an alchemist born as a terminally ill boy, she built herself a healthy female body to live as and is one of the game's playable DLC characters.
Granblue Fantasy Versus	Belial	Bisexual	Belial is one of the primary antagonists for the game and was introduced as a playable DLC character. He expresses direct attraction to both male and female characters in the game and makes frequent sexual passes at all characters.
Hades	Zagreus	Bisexual or pansexual	Zagreus, the rebellious child of Hades, was described by the game's writer and designer Greg Kasavin to be "bisexual or pansexual" to fit with the game's Greek setting. His romance options include the god of death Thanatos, and Megaera of the Fury Sisters, which he can pursue independently or romance at the same time, beginning a polyamorous relationship. In the game, Zagreus also seems to briefly flirt with Achilles once.
Hades	Achilles	Gay or bisexual	Achilles and Patroclus are former lovers, separated by Hades in the Underworld.
Hades	Patroclus	Gay or bisexual	Achilles and Patroclus are former lovers, separated by Hades in the Underworld.
Hades	Chaos	Non-binary	Chaos is non-binary and uses they/them pronouns.
Hatsune Miku: Colorful Stage	Mizuki Akiyama	Genderqueer / Transfeminine	On the game's official Japanese website, Mizuki's gender on their profile is listed as "?". In flashbacks, Mizuki is shown with a boy's school uniform and shorter hair. In the present they have long hair and a girl's uniform. They are referred to with "she" and "they" pronouns. In the game, she sings a cover of "Villain" by teniwoha, a song primarily about being transgender.
Haven	Yu	Gay or lesbian (optional)	The game's story is about a couple who flee their home because their society doesn't allow them to be together. As of the March 2022 "Couples Update", the protagonists, Yu and Kay, can be chosen to be in a heterosexual, lesbian or gay relationship.
Haven	Kay	Gay or lesbian (optional)	The game's story is about a couple who flee their home because their society doesn't allow them to be together. As of the March 2022 "Couples Update", the protagonists, Yu and Kay, can be chosen to be in a heterosexual, lesbian or gay relationship.
Legends of Runeterra	Leona	Lesbian	As part of the Pride 2021 event celebrating LGBT Pride Month, Riot Games released the short story "Rise With Me", focusing on the backstory of Diana and Leona. The short story details how the two women fell in love and were each other's first kiss. The two also appear in promotional art for Riot Games' 2023 Pride Month Celebrations.
Legends of Runeterra	Diana	Lesbian	As part of the Pride 2021 event celebrating LGBT Pride Month, Riot Games released the short story "Rise With Me", focusing on the backstory of Diana and Leona. The short story details how the two women fell in love and were each other's first kiss. The two also appear in promotional art for Riot Games' 2023 Pride Month Celebrations.
Legends of Runeterra	Caitlyn	Lesbian	In the animated series Arcane (2021–present), which is set a few years before the events of the game, there are multiple hints that Vi and Caitlyn are attracted to each other. This has since been reinforced, with Riot's 2023 LGBT Pride Month content specifically highlighting the pair, alongside a selection of other confirmed LGBT characters. In the event's promotional art, Vi is shown wearing a lesbian flag pin.
Legends of Runeterra	Vi	Lesbian	In the animated series Arcane (2021–present), which is set a few years before the events of the game, there are multiple hints that Vi and Caitlyn are attracted to each other. This has since been reinforced, with Riot's 2023 LGBT Pride Month content specifically highlighting the pair, alongside a selection of other confirmed LGBT characters. In the event's promotional art, Vi is shown wearing a lesbian flag pin.
Legends of Runeterra	Neeko	Lesbian	Neeko was confirmed to be lesbian by the senior narrative writer, Matt Dunn when she was added to League of Legends in 2018. This has since been reinforced by interactions in Legends of Runeterra, and her appearance in promotional material for Riot Games' 2023 Pride Month celebrations.
Legends of Runeterra	Nami	Bisexual	Nami, Tama, and Loto are in a polyamorous relationship. Their relationship was later confirmed by the game's narrative lead, Meaghan Bowe. The three of them also appear in promotional material for Riot Games' 2023 Pride Month celebrations.
Legends of Runeterra	Tama	Bisexual	Nami, Tama, and Loto are in a polyamorous relationship. Their relationship was later confirmed by the game's narrative lead, Meaghan Bowe. The three of them also appear in promotional material for Riot Games' 2023 Pride Month celebrations.
Legends of Runeterra	Loto	Bisexual	Nami, Tama, and Loto are in a polyamorous relationship. Their relationship was later confirmed by the game's narrative lead, Meaghan Bowe. The three of them also appear in promotional material for Riot Games' 2023 Pride Month celebrations.
Legends of Runeterra	Varus/Valmar and Kai	Gay	Varus is a Darkin, a creature whose actual body is a weapon who can possess someone who attempts to wield it. Varus is not gay, but his host body was created when he attempted to possess two hunters, Valmar and Kai, simultaneously. The two hunters' love was strong enough to allow their conscience to be shared with the Darkin, with all three now controlling the body. A music video titled "As We Fall" detailing this event was released in 2017.
Legends of Runeterra	Twisted Fate	Pansexual	Devon Giehl, former creative designer and writer at Riot Games, revealed in 2018 that she had initially planned for Twisted Fate to have been in a relationship with his partner, Graves, but these were never officially canonised at the time. However, the pair later appeared prominently in Riot Games' 2022 Pride celebrations. During the event a story further highlighting their relationship was released. In League of Legends' 2023 Pride Month promotional art Twisted Fate wears the pansexual flag's colors in his hat, and he is featured again alongside Graves in art throughout the event.
Legends of Runeterra	Legion Veteran	Gay	Legion Veteran's flavor text describes his husband's care returning him to health after almost losing his life in war.
Legends of Runeterra	Tyari/The Traveler	Trans woman	Tyari was a Solari youth who, unsure in her future, sought the stars' guidance. Among them she saw an unfamiliar constellation and climbed Mount Targon in search of it. At the top she was judged worthy and ascended to become a Celestial, embodying the constellation she'd been following and became The Traveler. Tyari features throughout promotional art for Riot Games' 2023 Pride Celebrations.
Legends of Runeterra	Dess	Lesbian	Dess and Ada are Sentinels from the twin cities of Piltover and Zaun. They met in a bar between the two cities and their relationship sprung from there. The two feature in promotional art for Riot Games' 2023 Pride Celebrations, and flirt and reaffirm their relationship in their voice lines.
Legends of Runeterra	Ada	Lesbian	Dess and Ada are Sentinels from the twin cities of Piltover and Zaun. They met in a bar between the two cities and their relationship sprung from there. The two feature in promotional art for Riot Games' 2023 Pride Celebrations, and flirt and reaffirm their relationship in their voice lines.
Legends of Runeterra	Shomi	Non-binary	Shomi is a Zaunite hoverboarder. They use they/them pronouns.
Legends of Runeterra	Lani	Lesbian	Lani and Miel are Noxian weaponsmiths. The two are in a relationship, as revealed in their voicelines and interactions.
Legends of Runeterra	Miel	Lesbian	Lani and Miel are Noxian weaponsmiths. The two are in a relationship, as revealed in their voicelines and interactions.
Legends of Runeterra	Tauulo	Trans man	Tauulo is a Buhru cultist, worshipping the sea god Nagakabourus. His identity was implied in the bio released alongside him, and confirmed by Legends of Runeterra writer, Ro Williams. His artwork features tattoos reminiscent of mastectomy scars.
Legends of Runeterra	Chaska	Non-binary	Chaska is a shepherd and warrior. They use they/them pronouns.
Legends of Runeterra	Janan	Lesbian	Janan is a huntress, joining fellow monster hunters after being widowed by the death of her wife, Laureen.
Legends of Runeterra	Dashing Dandy	Gay	Dashing Dandy's voice lines imply a crush on fellow pit fighter, Sett. He is also featured in promotional art for Riot Games' 2023 Pride Celebrations.
Our Life: Beginnings & Always	Jamie Last	Non-binary	Determined by the player, however, by default is non-binary and uses they/them pronouns. Can enter into a relationship with male characters regardless of gender identity.
Our Life: Beginnings & Always	Pamela Last	Lesbian	Pamela and Noelani are a married couple.
Our Life: Beginnings & Always	Noelani Last	Bisexual	Pamela and Noelani are a married couple.
Our Life: Beginnings & Always	Cove Holden	Demisexual	Cove is demisexual and panromantic. Baxter and Derek are pansexual. All three characters can enter into a relationship with the player character regardless of gender identity.
Our Life: Beginnings & Always	Derek Suarez	Pansexual	Cove is demisexual and panromantic. Baxter and Derek are pansexual. All three characters can enter into a relationship with the player character regardless of gender identity.
Our Life: Beginnings & Always	Baxter Ward	Pansexual	Cove is demisexual and panromantic. Baxter and Derek are pansexual. All three characters can enter into a relationship with the player character regardless of gender identity.
Our Life: Beginnings & Always	Terry Brook	Transgender	Terry is a transgender man.
Please Be Happy	Miho	Lesbian	Miho, the main character, can romance either Juliet or Aspen.
Please Be Happy	Juliet	Lesbian	Miho, the main character, can romance either Juliet or Aspen.
Please Be Happy	Aspen	Lesbian	Miho, the main character, can romance either Juliet or Aspen.
Remothered: Broken Porcelain	Rosemary Reed / Lindsay	Lesbian	
Spiritfarer	Summer	Lesbian	In life, Summer was married to Stella's Aunt Rose (Stella being the player character). As the player does favors for her, she goes more into detail about their relationship.
Star Wars: Squadrons	Varko Grey	Gay	Varko is an Imperial squadron leader who mentions that he has an husband for whom he wants to retire from the army after the war.
Star Wars: Squadrons	Rae Sloane	Bisexual	Rae is a high-ranking female Imperial officer and one of the first leaders of the First Order. Her bisexuality is confirmed in the novel Star Wars Aftermath: Empire Ends.
Star Wars: Squadrons	Keo Venzee	Non-binary	Keo uses they/them pronouns.
Tell Me Why	Tyler Ronan	Trans man and pansexual	Tyler and his twin sister Alyson travel to their childhood home in Alaska and must come to terms with their childhood. The game will also deal with how Tyler, who has transitioned since leaving home, is being affected. Dontnod worked with GLAAD to help create the character. Tyler can potentially start a relationship with Alyson's best friend Michael.
Tell Me Why	Michael	Bisexual	Tyler and his twin sister Alyson travel to their childhood home in Alaska and must come to terms with their childhood. The game will also deal with how Tyler, who has transitioned since leaving home, is being affected. Dontnod worked with GLAAD to help create the character. Tyler can potentially start a relationship with Alyson's best friend Michael.
The Last of Us Part II	Ellie	Lesbian	Ellie is one of the main characters and she is in a relationship with a woman named Dina. At the start of the game, it was revealed that Dina formerly dated Jesse.
The Last of Us Part II	Dina	Bisexual woman	Ellie is one of the main characters and she is in a relationship with a woman named Dina. At the start of the game, it was revealed that Dina formerly dated Jesse.
The Last of Us Part II	Lev	Transgender man	Lev is trans and hunted by the Seraphites, who misgender and deadname him frequently.
VALORANT	Raze	Lesbian	Following the two characters flirting in in-game interactions, and allusions in the game's spin-off dating sim for April Fools, the Valorant Twitter account confirmed the pair were in a relationship through a series of photos that culminated in the two sharing a kiss. The pair also featured on promotional art for Riot Games' 2023 Pride celebrations.
VALORANT	Killjoy	Lesbian	Following the two characters flirting in in-game interactions, and allusions in the game's spin-off dating sim for April Fools, the Valorant Twitter account confirmed the pair were in a relationship through a series of photos that culminated in the two sharing a kiss. The pair also featured on promotional art for Riot Games' 2023 Pride celebrations.
VALORANT	Clove	Non-binary	Clove is a playable character who is confirmed to be non-binary and uses they/them pronouns.
Vitamin Connection	Selenium	Non-binary	Selenium is referred as they/them in a tweet made by developer WayForward as well as in-game on the pause screen during Story 5.
Watch Dogs: Legion	Various procedurally-generated playable characters and NPCs	Various LGBTQ+ identities	The procedural generation that generates Legion's characters includes many options for their sexualities and genders, giving them same-gender significant others or assigning them sexualities outright in their "metadata" section.

== 2021 ==
Title	Character(s)	Classification	Notes
Bad End Theater	Tragedy	Lesbian	Tragedy, the overarching antagonist, is revealed during the true ending to have created the Bad End Theater as a way to cope with the separation of her female lover.
Bad End Theater	Maiden	Lesbian	The Maiden and Overlord show romantic interest towards each other throughout the game, and are shown to enter a relationship in the true ending. Their sexualities were reinforced in an plush announcement video, referring to the two as lesbians.
Bad End Theater	Overlord	Lesbian	The Maiden and Overlord show romantic interest towards each other throughout the game, and are shown to enter a relationship in the true ending. Their sexualities were reinforced in an plush announcement video, referring to the two as lesbians.
Bad End Theater	Underling	Non-binary	Exclusively uses they/them pronouns.
Boyfriend Dungeon	Player character	Bisexual (optional), non-binary (optional)	The player can choose between he/him, she/her, and they/them pronouns, and can date male, female, and non-binary characters.
Boyfriend Dungeon	Rowan	Non-binary	Uses they/them pronouns and is non-binary.
Boyfriend Dungeon	Sawyer	Non-binary	Uses they/them pronouns and is non-binary.
Boyfriend Dungeon	Dr. Holmes	Non-binary	Added in the Secret Weapons update, Dr. Holmes uses she/they pronouns.
Deathloop	Colt Vahn	Bisexual	Colt, the game's protagonist, is revealed to have had a past affair with Frank Spicer, one of the game's antagonists.
Deathloop	Frank Spicer	Bisexual	Colt infiltrates the home of Frank Spicer, during which Frank's voice can be heard over the radio as he reminisces about his life as a musician. If the player remains long enough, these reflections take a more personal turn: Frank alludes to Colt's betrayal and reveals that the two had been lovers on and off, ultimately dedicating an innuendo-laden song to him.
Gamedec	Player character	Bisexual (optional), non-binary (optional)	The Player can choose between he/him, she/her pronouns which is independent of their appearance.
Gamedec	Ken Zhou	Bisexual	Ken Zhou is the only romance option in game and can be romanced by any gender. It is up to the player if they want to spend the night with Ken or not.
Guilty Gear: Strive	Testament	Non-binary	Testament is an androgynous character. In previous Guilty Gear games, Testament was referred to as a man. In Guilty Gear Strive, Testament is referred to in gender-neutral ways and confirmed to be "neither male nor female".
Guilty Gear: Strive	Bridget	Trans woman	Bridget returns as the first character in Guilty Gear Strive's second downloadable content pack. Bridget was born male, one of twin brothers named and raised by her parents as a girl in a British village. They do this to protect her since the villagers believe that identical twins bring bad luck. In Strive, her arcade mode story revolves around her being unsure whether she is truly happy and is being her true self, which is revealed to be her questioning her gender identity in one of the endings. Depending on how well the player performs, she makes progress towards figuring it out and accepting change for the better, with the aforementioned ending directly showing her coming out to Goldlewis Dickinson and Ky Kiske.
Guilty Gear: Strive	Venom	Gay	In the Knight of Knives Drama CD, It is shown that Venom experiences attraction to another male character, being Zato-1.
Lake	Meredith Weiss	Bisexual	Meredith Weiss is the protagonist of Lake. Depending on the player's choices, she may be romantically involved with a man named Robert Harris or a woman named Angie Eastman during her time in her hometown, Providence Oaks.
Lake	Angie Eastman	Lesbian	Angie is the owner of a VHS rental shop, who is romantically interested in Meredith Weiss, the protagonist of Lake. If Meredith reciprocates her feelings, a potential ending chosen by the player would see the couple departing from Providence Oaks and committing to an itinerant lifestyle.
Life Is Strange: True Colors	Alex Chen	Bisexual	Narrative adventure game with a bisexual protagonist and other LGBT characters.
Life Is Strange: True Colors	Steph Gingrich	Lesbian	Narrative adventure game with a bisexual protagonist and other LGBT characters.
Life Is Strange: True Colors	Izzie	Lesbian	Narrative adventure game with a bisexual protagonist and other LGBT characters.
Life Is Strange: True Colors	Izzie	Trans woman	Narrative adventure game with a bisexual protagonist and other LGBT characters.
Pathfinder: Wrath of the Righteous	Knight Commander	Gay, Lesbian or Bisexual	RPG with multiple romance options and LGBT NPCs.
Pathfinder: Wrath of the Righteous	Sosiel	Gay	RPG with multiple romance options and LGBT NPCs.
Pathfinder: Wrath of the Righteous	Daeran	Bisexual	RPG with multiple romance options and LGBT NPCs.
Pathfinder: Wrath of the Righteous	Wenduag	Bisexual	RPG with multiple romance options and LGBT NPCs.
Pathfinder: Wrath of the Righteous	Arueshalae	Bisexual	RPG with multiple romance options and LGBT NPCs.
Pathfinder: Wrath of the Righteous	Queen Galfrey	Bisexual	RPG with multiple romance options and LGBT NPCs.
Pathfinder: Wrath of the Righteous	Ulbrig	Bisexual	RPG with multiple romance options and LGBT NPCs.
Pathfinder: Wrath of the Righteous	Anevia	Lesbian	RPG with multiple romance options and LGBT NPCs.
Pathfinder: Wrath of the Righteous	Irabeth	Lesbian	RPG with multiple romance options and LGBT NPCs.
Psychonauts 2	Helmut Fullbear	Gay	Helmut Fullbear and Bob Zanotto are in a long-term, stable relationship. One memory shows Bob proposing and then later marrying Helmut. Helmut's body was lost, and Bob broke down after losing the love of his life, but in the game's present, Helmut's brain is found and placed in a new body, giving the two the chance to rekindle their relationship.
Psychonauts 2	Robert Zanotto	Gay	Helmut Fullbear and Bob Zanotto are in a long-term, stable relationship. One memory shows Bob proposing and then later marrying Helmut. Helmut's body was lost, and Bob broke down after losing the love of his life, but in the game's present, Helmut's brain is found and placed in a new body, giving the two the chance to rekindle their relationship.
Rainbow Billy: The Curse of the Leviathan	Billy	Non-binary	Billy, the main character, is canonically non-binary.
Scarlet Hollow	Player character	Bisexual (optional)	
The Forgotten City	Vergil	Gay	Vergil is a merchant NPC who can be encountered either cleaning graffiti from his shop or working as a blacksmith. Through dialogue, the player learns that the graffiti consists of homophobic threats targeting Vergil after his sexuality is exposed. The investigation reveals that the perpetrator is Rufius, who, burdened by illness and internalised self-hatred, projects his repressed homosexuality onto Vergil through harassment. In one possible ending of the game, this conflict is resolved and the two characters may enter a relationship.
The Forgotten City	Rufius	Gay	
Unpacking	Unnamed protagonist	Bisexual	The main character is a bisexual woman.

== 2022 ==
Title	Character(s)	Classification	Notes
Beacon Pines	Ilona and Nelly Moedwil	Lesbian	The two are a lesbian couple, and are the mothers of Beck.
BOSSGAME: The Final Boss Is My Heart	Sophie	Lesbian	Sophie and Anna are in a romantic relationship with each other, and Sophie is transgender.
BOSSGAME: The Final Boss Is My Heart	Sophie	Trans woman	Sophie and Anna are in a romantic relationship with each other, and Sophie is transgender.
BOSSGAME: The Final Boss Is My Heart	Anna	Lesbian	Sophie and Anna are in a romantic relationship with each other, and Sophie is transgender.
Desta: The Memories Between	Desta	Non-binary	The protagonist, Desta, must relive their memories and repair their relationships in an exploration through their dreams.
Fear & Hunger 2: Termina	Marina	Trans woman	Marina's identity as trans is often brought up in the game and plays a central role in her story.
Frog Detective 3: Corruption at Cowboy County	The Detective	Gay	In the third installment of the series, The Detective (the player character of the series) encounters a sloth named Sherman who flirts with him and compliments his attractiveness. While The Detective responds to his offer for a date with "Maybe after I've solved this case", the notes he writes about Sherman makes his attraction to him clear. During the game's credits, the two are confirmed to have gone on a date, which (according to Sherman) went well.
Frog Detective 3: Corruption at Cowboy County	Sherman	Gay	In the third installment of the series, The Detective (the player character of the series) encounters a sloth named Sherman who flirts with him and compliments his attractiveness. While The Detective responds to his offer for a date with "Maybe after I've solved this case", the notes he writes about Sherman makes his attraction to him clear. During the game's credits, the two are confirmed to have gone on a date, which (according to Sherman) went well.
God of War Ragnarök	Jari and Somr	Gay	The central characters of the "Across the Realms" side quest. Mimir tells of the two men travelling together, and how they eventually discovered that, even when compared to the beautiful places they'd travel to, that being together was the part they savored the most, the two sharing their first kiss in the field of Jötunheim. This side quest was based on the real life relationship of Sam Handrick and Jake Snipes (two people worked for Santa Monica Studio), and was pitched by Handrick after Snipes died in 2020 due to epilepsy.
Gotham Knights	Tim Drake (Robin)	Bisexual	There are hints around the game that suggest the sexual orientation of Robin. The game's narrative director stated that "Tim is bi in the comics, therefore Tim is bi in the game."
Harvestella	Player character	Non-binary (optional)	The game's character creator includes a non-binary option.
I Was a Teenage Exocolonist	Player character	Genderqueer (optional)	The player character can be customized to be more feminine, masculine, or androgynous, and the player can choose their pronouns and preferred gendered terms.
I Was a Teenage Exocolonist	Romanceable characters	Bisexual or pansexual	All romanceable characters can be dated regardless of their gender or the player's gender.
I Was a Teenage Exocolonist	Side characters	Transgender	
Just Dance 2023 Edition	Mihaly	Non-binary	Mihaly is an artistic shaman, going through a spiritual journey and quest to understand and master the Flow and its energies and techniques through calm and tranquil dancing. The character is referred to with singular they/them pronouns by the official Just Dance Twitter account. The coach is also confirmed to be non-binary in a response to a fan tweet.
Just Dance 2023 Edition	Grace	Bisexual	Grace is in a relationship with another woman as she has been with men before.
Lil Gator Game	Lil Gator	Non-binary	The player character of the game, whose name is determined by the player (though they are referred to as "Lil Gator" outside of the game). Their identity has been made clear several times by the development team.
Lil Gator Game	Avery	Non-binary	A friend of the Lil Gator's, who helps them to convince "Big Sis" to stop studying. They use they/them pronouns in the game, and the development team has confirmed their identity outside of it.
Marvel's Midnight Suns	The Hunter (player character)	Non-binary (optional)	The Hunter's appearance is fully customisable. At the beginning of the game, players choose between two body types conventionally associated with male and female embodiments, although these options are not explicitly labelled in gendered terms. Beyond this initial selection, players are free to modify the character's appearance without gender restrictions, including hairstyles and facial hair, regardless of the chosen body type. Throughout the game, other characters consistently refer to the Hunter using they/them pronouns, reinforcing the character's non-binary and player-defined identity.
Marvel's Midnight Suns	Agatha Harkness	Lesbian	Caretaker, the leader of the Abbey and Hunter's aunt, is portrayed as being in a centuries-long romantic relationship with Agatha Harkness.
Marvel's Midnight Suns	Caretaker	Lesbian	Caretaker, the leader of the Abbey and Hunter's aunt, is portrayed as being in a centuries-long romantic relationship with Agatha Harkness.
Marvel's Midnight Suns	Nico Minoru	Bisexual	Nico Minoru was confirmed to be bisexual in Marvel Comics and hints at her past relationship with Karolina Dean.
Marvel's Midnight Suns	Deadpool	Pansexual/ Queer	Deadpool is suggested to be Pansexual/ Queer both in Marvel Comics and in the game.
Marvel's Midnight Suns	Magik	Pansexual	Illyana Rasputina (Magik) was confirmed to be pansexual in Marvel Comics.
Potionomics	Sylvia	Pansexual, polyamorous	Sylvia, the player character, can enter relationships with male, female, and non-binary characters. As of a 2024 update, Sylvia can also enter a non-monogamous romantic relationships with multiple characters simultaneously.
Potionomics	Quinn	Nonbinary	Quinn is non-binary and uses they/them pronouns.
Potionomics	All female romanceable characters	Lesbian	The female romanceable characters can all enter relationships with Sylvia.
SIGNALIS	Elster	Lesbian	The player character is LSTR, a Replika unit otherwise known as Elster, who awakens and searches for her missing partner, Ariane, in a survival horror setting.
SIGNALIS	Ariane Yeong	Lesbian	The player character is LSTR, a Replika unit otherwise known as Elster, who awakens and searches for her missing partner, Ariane, in a survival horror setting.
Super Lesbian Animal RPG	Melody Amaranth	Bisexual	Super Lesbian Animal RPG is a turn based role-playing game with a cast of queer anthropomorphic animals, including the main 4 player characters.
Super Lesbian Animal RPG	Melody Amaranth	Trans woman	Super Lesbian Animal RPG is a turn based role-playing game with a cast of queer anthropomorphic animals, including the main 4 player characters.
Super Lesbian Animal RPG	Allison Goleta	Lesbian	Super Lesbian Animal RPG is a turn based role-playing game with a cast of queer anthropomorphic animals, including the main 4 player characters.
Super Lesbian Animal RPG	Claire Higsby	Lesbian	Super Lesbian Animal RPG is a turn based role-playing game with a cast of queer anthropomorphic animals, including the main 4 player characters.
Super Lesbian Animal RPG	Claire Higsby	Trans woman	Super Lesbian Animal RPG is a turn based role-playing game with a cast of queer anthropomorphic animals, including the main 4 player characters.
Super Lesbian Animal RPG	Jodie Cadwell	Lesbian	Super Lesbian Animal RPG is a turn based role-playing game with a cast of queer anthropomorphic animals, including the main 4 player characters.
Temtem	Player character	Non-binary (optional)	The game's character creator includes he/him, she/her, and they/them pronoun options in the English version, and includes other gender-neutral options in other languages.
Temtem	Max	Non-binary	The player character's rival, who uses they/them pronouns.
The Dark Pictures Anthology: The Devil in Me	Erin and Jamie	Lesbian	Erin and Jamie are two of the protagonists of The Devil in Me. They both start the game with a crush on one another, which the player can act on. If they do, the two kiss, and, should they both survive the game, officially start dating.
The Quarry	Ryan	Bisexual	At Chris's office, Dylan asks questions about Ryan's life, and at a certain point in this conversation, Ryan seems to suggest that he's interested in both genders. Dylan also starts flirting with Ryan, which the game says that Ryan seems interested. Later, the game makes Ryan choose between Kaitlyn or Dylan to kiss in a Truth or Dare game.
The Quarry	Dylan	Gay	At Chris's office, Dylan asks questions about Ryan's life, and at a certain point in this conversation, Ryan seems to suggest that he's interested in both genders. Dylan also starts flirting with Ryan, which the game says that Ryan seems interested. Later, the game makes Ryan choose between Kaitlyn or Dylan to kiss in a Truth or Dare game.

== 2023 ==
Title	Character(s)	Identity	Notes
Baldur's Gate III	Player character	Queer (optional)	The player character in Baldur's Gate 3 can be male, female, non-binary, or other, with their sexual characteristics being defined separately to their gender. They can enter relationships with other characters regardless of gender, allowing the character's sexuality and gender identity to be entirely up to the player.
Baldur's Gate III	Astarion Ancunín	Pansexual	The player can enter relationships with all romanceable characters regardless of gender identity. The characters' sexualities were confirmed as pansexual in the Magic: The Gathering set "Battle for Baldur's Gate" by the set's narrative lead, Justice Geddes.
Baldur's Gate III	Minthara Baenre	Pansexual	The player can enter relationships with all romanceable characters regardless of gender identity. The characters' sexualities were confirmed as pansexual in the Magic: The Gathering set "Battle for Baldur's Gate" by the set's narrative lead, Justice Geddes.
Baldur's Gate III	Karlach Cliffgate	Pansexual	The player can enter relationships with all romanceable characters regardless of gender identity. The characters' sexualities were confirmed as pansexual in the Magic: The Gathering set "Battle for Baldur's Gate" by the set's narrative lead, Justice Geddes.
Baldur's Gate III	Gale Dekarios	Pansexual	The player can enter relationships with all romanceable characters regardless of gender identity. The characters' sexualities were confirmed as pansexual in the Magic: The Gathering set "Battle for Baldur's Gate" by the set's narrative lead, Justice Geddes.
Baldur's Gate III	Halsin	Pansexual	The player can enter relationships with all romanceable characters regardless of gender identity. The characters' sexualities were confirmed as pansexual in the Magic: The Gathering set "Battle for Baldur's Gate" by the set's narrative lead, Justice Geddes.
Baldur's Gate III	Lae'zel	Pansexual	The player can enter relationships with all romanceable characters regardless of gender identity. The characters' sexualities were confirmed as pansexual in the Magic: The Gathering set "Battle for Baldur's Gate" by the set's narrative lead, Justice Geddes.
Baldur's Gate III	Wyll Ravengard	Pansexual	The player can enter relationships with all romanceable characters regardless of gender identity. The characters' sexualities were confirmed as pansexual in the Magic: The Gathering set "Battle for Baldur's Gate" by the set's narrative lead, Justice Geddes.
Baldur's Gate III	Shadowheart	Pansexual	The player can enter relationships with all romanceable characters regardless of gender identity. The characters' sexualities were confirmed as pansexual in the Magic: The Gathering set "Battle for Baldur's Gate" by the set's narrative lead, Justice Geddes.
Baldur's Gate III	Beldron	Gay	Beldron and Lunkbug are Gnomish husbands being held captive in Grymforge when the player meets them. Their fate after that is up to the player.
Baldur's Gate III	Lunkbug	Gay	Beldron and Lunkbug are Gnomish husbands being held captive in Grymforge when the player meets them. Their fate after that is up to the player.
Baldur's Gate III	Dame Aylin	Lesbian	Aylin and Isobel are followers of Selûne who can be reunited by the player's actions. If they are, they embrace and reveal their relationship.
Baldur's Gate III	Isobel Thorm	Lesbian	Aylin and Isobel are followers of Selûne who can be reunited by the player's actions. If they are, they embrace and reveal their relationship.
Baldur's Gate III	Omeluum	Non-Binary	Omeluum is an Illithid, separated from the Hivemind its people normally obey. It has instead joined the Society of Brilliance, a group of scholars studying the peoples and places in the Underdark. Omeluum uses it/its pronouns.
Baldur's Gate III	Astele 'Nine-Fingers' Keene	Lesbian	Nine-Fingers Keene leads the Baldur's Gate Thieves Guild with her girlfriend, Rilsa Rael. Their relationship was implied in the adventure module "Murder in Baldur's Gate", and later confirmed in the Magic: The Gathering set "Battle for Baldur's Gate", by the set's narrative lead, Justice Geddes.
Baldur's Gate III	Nafula	Lesbian	The player can meet Nafula in the tavern 'The Blushing Mermaid', where they overhear her father trying to convince her to marry into wealth. Nafula asks the player to weigh in on whether she's being unreasonable by refusing. When you side with her, her father pressures further until she states she just wants to be happy, and she's happy with Sasha; much to her father's chagrin.
Baldur's Gate III	Fist Jara	Lesbian	Jara is a member of the Flaming Fist. You can encounter her getting intimate with Naoise, the female nymph courtesan, before it is revealed she is a cultist of the game's antagonist, the Absolute. At this revelation, her transformation is triggered and she becomes a hostile Illithid.
Baldur's Gate III	Naoise Nallinto	Pansexual	Naoise is a courtesan at the brothel, Sharess' Caress. After witnessing Jara's transformation, when talking with Naoise, she may reveal to insightful players that she was attracted to the Illithid, and found it arousing. Illithids do not have genders, nor sexual characteristics.
Baldur's Gate III	Nocturne	Transgender	In Act 1, Shadowheart can be given a curative mushroom called Noblestalk in the Underdark, which, If consumed, causes her to remember a friend she had at her Sharran Cloister in Baldur's Gate, a Tiefling boy named Rennald. Later, you can meet a Tiefling named Nocturne who resembles Rennald in Act 3. Speaking to her, she confirms she is the same person as Rennald, but female, suggesting she is transgender. Nocturne is also voiced by Abigail Thorn, a transgender actress and playwright.
Baldur's Gate III	Raphael	Bisexual	Raphael is a cambion who offers his aid to the player, for a price. The player can venture into his house and encounter Haarlep, Raphael's personal Incubus, in his boudoir. Haarlep is able to take whatever form most please Raphael, and most of the time, that is the form of Raphael himself, though Haarlep reveals they're occasionally asked to instead take the form of "Archduchess Raphael", a female version of the cambion.
Baldur's Gate III	Chorizo	Gay	Chorizo is the chef at the brothel Sharess' Caress. When the player approaches him, he assumes they think he's a courtesan and immediately shuts them down, telling them he has a husband. And that you're not his type.
Charade Maniacs	Mizuki Iochi	Non-binary	Is non-binary, and uses they/them pronouns in the English version of the game.
Class of '09: The Re-up	Ari	Lesbian	Comes out as lesbian. Dates Nicole and Hunter (in a mixed-orientation relationship).
Class of '09: The Re-up	Emily	Bisexual	Has an offscreen boyfriend while experiencing sexual attraction to Nicole.
Class of '09: The Re-up	Nicole	Lesbian	Dates Emily and Ari. Never explicitly identifies with any sexuality.
Crash Team Rumble	Catbat	Non-binary	Catbat uses they/them pronouns and is stated by the developers to be non-binary.
Dead Island 2	Ryan	Bisexual	Ryan is bisexual, he worked as a male stripper who might also have sex with people in exchange for money and based on his dialogue about intimacy. He has feeling for Michael Anders, The male PA of Emma Jaunt, his dialogue always concerned during the main quest O Michael, Where Art Thou? and he was heartbroken after Michael died by his hands.
Eternights	Player character	Bisexual	The player character's love interests consist of several girls and one boy, Yohan.
Eternights	Yohan	Gay	The player character's love interests consist of several girls and one boy, Yohan.
Final Fantasy XVI	Dion Lesage	Gay	Dion and Terrence are in a relationship with each other that is depicted throughout the game.
Final Fantasy XVI	Terence	Gay	Dion and Terrence are in a relationship with each other that is depicted throughout the game.
Fire Emblem Engage	Alfred	Bisexual	Characters are romanceable regardless of the selected gender of the player character.
Fire Emblem Engage	Bunet	Bisexual	Characters are romanceable regardless of the selected gender of the player character.
Fire Emblem Engage	Chloé	Bisexual	Characters are romanceable regardless of the selected gender of the player character.
Fire Emblem Engage	Citrinne	Bisexual	Characters are romanceable regardless of the selected gender of the player character.
Fire Emblem Engage	Goldmary	Bisexual	Characters are romanceable regardless of the selected gender of the player character.
Fire Emblem Engage	Diamant	Bisexual	Characters are romanceable regardless of the selected gender of the player character.
Fire Emblem Engage	Ivy	Bisexual	Characters are romanceable regardless of the selected gender of the player character.
Fire Emblem Engage	Jade	Bisexual	Characters are romanceable regardless of the selected gender of the player character.
Fire Emblem Engage	Kagetsu	Bisexual	Characters are romanceable regardless of the selected gender of the player character.
Fire Emblem Engage	Lapis	Bisexual	Characters are romanceable regardless of the selected gender of the player character.
Fire Emblem Engage	Louis	Bisexual	Characters are romanceable regardless of the selected gender of the player character.
Fire Emblem Engage	Mauvier	Bisexual	Characters are romanceable regardless of the selected gender of the player character.
Fire Emblem Engage	Merrin	Bisexual	Characters are romanceable regardless of the selected gender of the player character.
Fire Emblem Engage	Panette	Bisexual	Characters are romanceable regardless of the selected gender of the player character.
Fire Emblem Engage	Seadall	Bisexual	Characters are romanceable regardless of the selected gender of the player character.
Goodbye Volcano High	Fang	Non-binary	The main protagonist, Fang, is non-binary. In the game, the player has the option to have Fang date their classmate Naomi.
Goodbye Volcano High	Naomi	Lesbian or pansexual	Fang receives a message from an unknown admirer who confesses their feelings for them, later revealed to be Naomi.
Harmony: The Fall of Reverie	Side characters	Non-binary	The side characters Chaos, Truth, and Yana are non-binary and use they/them pronouns.
Harmony: The Fall of Reverie	Side characters	Transgender	The protagonist's sister, Nora, is a trans woman.
Hogwarts Legacy	Sirona Ryan	Transgender	When the player asks Sirona Ryan about how she knows a certain goblin, she replies: "Hadn't seen him in years when he came in a few months ago. But, he recognized me instantly. Which is more than I can say for some of my own classmates. Took them a second to realize I was actually a witch, not a wizard."
Hogwarts Legacy	Mirabel Garlick	Lesbian	Evidenced in The Art and Making of Hogwarts Legacy; "She has yet to meet the right witch, but at present is content with her life at Hogwarts." and Hogwarts Legacy: The Official Game Guide; "...But Mirabel Garlick would never leave her students. So, even if the right witch were to come along, she'd simply have to love Hogwarts as much as Mirabel does."
Horizon Forbidden West: Burning Shores	Aloy	Lesbian or bisexual	Aloy is canonically a queer woman, and the player can choose for her to kiss Seyka, another woman. Aloy is played by pansexual actress Ashly Burch.
Horizon Forbidden West: Burning Shores	Seyka	Lesbian or bisexual	Aloy is canonically a queer woman, and the player can choose for her to kiss Seyka, another woman. Aloy is played by pansexual actress Ashly Burch.
In Stars and Time	Siffrin	Non-binary	Siffrin goes by he/they pronouns and is asexual.
In Stars and Time	Siffrin	Asexual	Siffrin goes by he/they pronouns and is asexual.
In Stars and Time	Mirabelle	Aromantic asexual	Mirabelle is both aromantic and asexual.
In Stars and Time	Isabeau	Transgender	Isabeau is confirmed to be transgender by the developer. In his Friendquest, he shares that he was once a nerd with "neat braids" (feminine, like his name), and his past self is referred to by they/them pronouns before he "Changed" his own body to be an airheaded jock with a lot of intelligence.
In Stars and Time	Bonnie	Non-binary	
Just Dance 2024 Edition	Iluquim	Non-binary	The character is referred by they/them pronouns.
Just Dance 2024 Edition	Mihaly	Non-binary	Same character as within Just Dance 2023 Edition.
Just Dance 2024 Edition	Ari	Bisexual	Ari and Grace are in a relationship with each other.
Just Dance 2024 Edition	Grace	Bisexual	Ari and Grace are in a relationship with each other.
Little Goody Two Shoes	Elise	Lesbian	The only romance options for Elise, the game's protagonist, are female characters.
Marvel's Spider-Man 2	Black Cat	Bisexual	Black Cat, aka Felicia Hardy, has been confirmed as bisexual, with her motivation in this storyline being the protection of her girlfriend.
Marvel's Spider-Man 2	Vijay and Lucas	Gay	Vijay and Lucas are a gay couple who attend Brooklyn Visions Academy. During one side quest, Miles helps Vijay ask his boyfriend to Homecoming.
My Time at Sandrock	Player character and all romanceable characters	Bisexual	Romanceable characters can be pursued regardless of gender.
Romancelvania	Drac	Bisexual or pansexual	The player can choose a body type (masculine or feminine) and voice (masculine or feminine) for their character, and the player can choose to date characters regardless of gender.
The Murder of Sonic the Hedgehog	Player character	Uses they/them pronouns	The character uses they/them pronouns, though Sega refused to comment when reporters from Kotaku enquired about the character being non-binary.
Tchia	Tchia		Tchia is in a relationship with another girl, Louise.
Thirsty Suitors	Jala	Bisexual or pansexual	Jala and her male, female, and non-binary exes are significant characters to the game's plot.
Thirsty Suitors	Kwame	Non-binary	

== 2024 ==
Title	Character(s)	Identity	Notes
Concord	Bazz	Trans woman	Bazz was confirmed by her voice actress Mila Jam to be a trans woman.
Dragon Age: The Veilguard	Rook (player character)	Queer (optional)	Players are able to select Rook's pronouns (she/her, he/him, and they/them are all options), sexual characteristics, and gender separately. They can also enter relationships with other characters regardless of gender, allowing the character's sexuality and gender identity to be entirely up to the player. In addition, genderfluid actor Erika Ishii provides one of Rook's in-game voice options.
Dragon Age: The Veilguard	Taash	Non-binary and pansexual	Played by non-binary actor Jin Maley and written by non-binary pansexual writer Trick Weekes.
Dragon Age: The Veilguard	Davrin	Pansexual	Neve is played by lesbian actress Jessica Clark.
Dragon Age: The Veilguard	Lucanis Dellamorte	Pansexual	Neve is played by lesbian actress Jessica Clark.
Dragon Age: The Veilguard	Neve Gallus	Pansexual	Neve is played by lesbian actress Jessica Clark.
Dragon Age: The Veilguard	Lace Harding	Pansexual	Neve is played by lesbian actress Jessica Clark.
Dragon Age: The Veilguard	Bellara Lutare	Pansexual	Neve is played by lesbian actress Jessica Clark.
Dragon Age: The Veilguard	Emmrich Volkarin	Pansexual	Neve is played by lesbian actress Jessica Clark.
Dragon Age: The Veilguard	Flynn	Non-binary	
Dustborn	Pax	Queer	Pax is a thirty-something con artist and "Anomal". She was in a romantic relationship with Noam who is non-binary. Pax is also pregnant.
Dustborn	Noam	Non-binary	Noam is Pax's ex-partner. Noam is non-binary and uses they/them pronouns. Noam is voiced by non-binary voice actor Celeste De Veazey.
Misericorde: Volume Two	Hedwig	Lesbian	In Misericorde, set in a convent, most of the nun have been in a romantic or sexual relationship with at least one other sister at the abbey. The protagonist, Hedwig, develops an increasingly physical relationship with another nun, Angela.
Misericorde: Volume Two	Adela	Lesbian	In Misericorde, set in a convent, most of the nun have been in a romantic or sexual relationship with at least one other sister at the abbey. The protagonist, Hedwig, develops an increasingly physical relationship with another nun, Angela.
Misericorde: Volume Two	Angela	Lesbian	In Misericorde, set in a convent, most of the nun have been in a romantic or sexual relationship with at least one other sister at the abbey. The protagonist, Hedwig, develops an increasingly physical relationship with another nun, Angela.
Misericorde: Volume Two	Other nuns	Lesbian	In Misericorde, set in a convent, most of the nun have been in a romantic or sexual relationship with at least one other sister at the abbey. The protagonist, Hedwig, develops an increasingly physical relationship with another nun, Angela.
Sucker for Love: Date to Die For	Stardust	Asexual	The protagonist, Stardust, is portrayed as asexual.
Suicide Squad: Kill the Justice League	Rick Flag Jr.	Gay or bisexual man	Rick Flag Jr. once had a sexual relationship with a man.
The Casting of Frank Stone	Bonnie Reveira	Lesbian	The game takes place over two timelines. In the timeline where Bonnie survives to the present she is one of the mothers of protagonist Maddie Riveriea-Platt. In the alternate timeline, she talks about her motivation to start a band being 'to get girls'.
Yandere Simulator	Ayano Aishi	Asexual uniromantic / monoromantic woman	In October 2024, YandereDev confirmed protagonist Ayano Aishi to be an asexual uniromantic / monoromantic, who "doesn't feel sexual attraction [and is] exclusively attracted [romantically] to one specific human being in all the world, regardless of that person's gender".

== 2025 ==
Title	Character(s)	Identity	Notes
Beloved Rapture	Johan and Aiden	Gay	
They Speak From The Abyss	Vanessa Rivera	Trans woman	
They Speak From The Abyss	Killer	Trans man	
Spirit Swap: Lofi Beats to Match-3 To	All	Non-binary	The developers stated in an interview that all of the game's characters are canonically non-binary.
Kingdom Come: Deliverance II	Henry of Skalitz	Bisexual	An implied attraction between the two characters was noted by fans in the first game. The sequel allows Henry to initiate a romance with Hans Capon through a series of dialogue choices. Henry can also have a brief romantic encounter with another male character, Black Bartosch, in addition to a number of female romance options. It was revealed by Christian Piontek, Warhorse Studios Community Manager that Henry was intended to be able to romance men as well as women in the first game, but this was cut due to budget constraints.
Kingdom Come: Deliverance II	Hans Capon	Bisexual	
Kingdom Come: Deliverance II	Erik	Gay	Erik and Toth are in a relationship with each other.
Kingdom Come: Deliverance II	Istvan Toth	Gay	Erik and Toth are in a relationship with each other.
Kingdom Come: Deliverance II	Black Bartosch	Gay	Henry can pursue a brief romance with Black Bartosch, who clearly states his disinterest in women.
Lost Records: Bloom & Rage	Swann Holloway	Queer	Can pursue a romance with any of the three girls in the game.
Lost Records: Bloom & Rage	Kat Mikaelsen	Queer	If not romanced by Swann, can instead be in a relationship with Nora.
Lost Records: Bloom & Rage	Autumn Lockhart	Queer	Can be romanced by Swann. Present day Autumn has an ex-husband, but says she went on a date with a woman recently.
Lost Records: Bloom & Rage	Nora Malakian	Lesbian	In addition to being a potential love interest for Swann and Kat, present day Nora is revealed to be married to a woman. During truth or dare in 1995, present day Nora remarks that she was never interested in men.
Afterlove EP	Rama	Bisexual	Rama can pursue a same-sex relationship with Satria, another male character who is openly gay. Following Satria's storyline leads to Rama admitting to himself and others that he is bisexual.
Afterlove EP	Satria	Gay	Rama can pursue a same-sex relationship with Satria, another male character who is openly gay. Following Satria's storyline leads to Rama admitting to himself and others that he is bisexual.
Date Everything!	All characters	Pansexual	The player can pursue a romantic relationship with any character, regardless of their own gender or that of their potential partner.
Hades II	Melinoë	Bisexual or pansexual	
Vampire: The Masquerade – Bloodlines 2	Phyre (player character)	Non-binary	Players will be able to choose pronouns, with the character creators going beyond "male and female models".
Vampire: The Masquerade – Bloodlines 2	Fabien Laguna	Pansexual	
Vampire: The Masquerade – Bloodlines 2	Safia Ulusoy	Pansexual	
Vampire: The Masquerade – Bloodlines 2	Fletcher	Pansexual	
Vampire: The Masquerade – Bloodlines 2	Niko Angelov	Pansexual	
Vampire: The Masquerade – Bloodlines 2	Amelia Thorn	Pansexual	
Vampire: The Masquerade – Bloodlines 2	Silky	Pansexual	
Vampire: The Masquerade – Bloodlines 2	Onda Cardoso	Pansexual	
Vampire: The Masquerade – Bloodlines 2	Benny Muldoon	Pansexual	
Vampire: The Masquerade – Bloodlines 2	Patience Boswell	Pansexual	
Vampire: The Masquerade – Bloodlines 2	Michael Tolliver	Gay	

== 2026 ==
Title	Character(s)	Classification	Notes
Denshattack!	Yamagata	Trans man	Yamagata is the leader of the gang Tarantulas. He is indicated to be a transgender man, as Yamagata has top surgical scars. Yamagata is voiced by transmasculine actor Oliver James Parkins.
Tomodachi Life: Living the Dream	Player-created Mii characters	Lesbian, bisexual, gay, aromantic asexual, non-binary (optional)	Players can create non-binary Miis, and can individually choose whether or not a Mii is attracted to male, female, or non-binary Miis.

== See also ==
- List of video games with LGBTQ characters
- List of video games with LGBTQ characters: 2010s
