= Lifeweaver =

Fictional character in the Overwatch franchise

- Overwatch character
- Lifeweaver's appearance in Overwatch 2
- First appearance: Overwatch 2 (2023)
- Designed by: Daryl Tan
- Voiced by: Phuwin Tangsakyuen

In-universe information
- Class: Support
- Origin: Chiang Mai, Thailand
- Nationality: Thai

Lifeweaver is the alias of Niran "Bua" Pruksamanee, a character in the Overwatch media franchise. He first appeared in Overwatch 2, a first-person hero shooter video game developed by Blizzard Entertainment, being added to game's playable character roster in 2023 and was voiced by Phuwin Tangsakyuen.

Designed by Daryl Tan to be a celebration of Thai culture, Lifeweaver is a "Support"-class hero with a focus on healing and team-based utility. Within Overwatch's lore, he originated from a wealthy family and took a liking to plants and gardening. Later in life, he invented alternate technology capable of producing organic matter with healing capabilities. The academy Niran was enrolled at sought to take the invention for themselves, which prompted Niran to go on the run, using his invention to heal the world and adopting the fugitive name Lifeweaver.

Lifeweaver was well received, with praise directed towards the character's flamboyant design as well as his optimism and energetic personality towards helping others. The character has become the subject of studies regarding representation of LGBTQ characters in video games, with many describing his appearance in the Overwatch cast as inclusive, and a positive step forward for LGBTQ representation.

== Conception and design ==
His concept was based around the idea of a "sci-fi druid". Once established to be a Thai hero, the developers at Blizzard built the character as a celebration of Thai culture, along with the mandala shape. In game, Blizzard saw Lifeweaver as a support character that would be preferred by players that sought good battleground positioning rather than precise aim.

== Appearances ==
Niran "Bua" Pruksamanee was born in Chiang Mai, Thailand, as the middle child of an extremely wealthy family. He grew up going to botanical festivals and wandering his compound's vast garden, where he mended plants alongside his family's gardeners. Niran's parents soon enrolled him into the Vishkar Architech Academy, where he met Satya Vaswani and was roommates with her at one point. As he grew older, Niran used his family's wealth to travel. On those journeys, he was struck at the sight of turmoil that existed all around the world and became determined to fix it. He soon created Biolight, an alternative of Vishkar's hard-light technology that produced organic material and could heal wounds in the blink of an eye. He dreamed of gifting biolight freely to the world, but Vishkar wanted to take ownership of Niran's invention for nefarious purposes. He refused and fled the academy with his primitive technology, which led to Vishkar's lawyers and other dangerous forces hunting him down. Now as the fugitive Lifeweaver, Niran is on the run from Vishkar whilst utilizing Biolight to heal the world and make it a better place. Blizzard has confirmed that Lifeweaver is pansexual, with voice lines suggesting a potential relationship with Baptiste. Outside of Overwatch, Lifeweaver also appears in the updated dating sim game Loverwatch, exclusive to Chinese regions.

=== Gameplay ===
In Overwatch, Lifeweaver is classified as a Support-class character, meant to provide aid for his team. His primary weapon, a Healing Blossom, must be charged before use, but provides a burst of healing to a targeted ally. Meanwhile, his alternate weapon, Thorn Volley, fires a burst of projectiles that does damage to enemies. He initially also had a passive ability, "Parting Gift", which would drop a lotus upon being defeated that could be picked up by enemies and allies alike for a small amount of healing, however this passive was removed in an update shortly after his release.

In addition, he has several abilities that require activation, though have a "cooldown" period after use and are unable to be used again during that duration. "Petal Platform" creates a lotus-shaped platform on the ground, that when stepped on by any character during the match will cause it to lift itself and them upward. Meanwhile, "Rejuvenating Dash" allows him to dash forward, and heals himself for a small amount as he does, and "Life Grip" can target allies to pull them quickly towards him. Lastly his Ultimate ability, "Tree of Life", needs to be charged before use. The ability charges slowly during the course of gameplay, and can be charged faster through damage dealt to the enemy team or healing provided to allies. Once full the ability can be activated to generate a large tree in the area that heals allies significantly while providing additional periodic healing for its duration. The tree acts as a physical barrier, and can absorb attacks and shield allies from them.

Within Season 4, starting in August 2026, Lifeweaver's Life Grip was modified to allow the targeted player to cancel the grip after a short period, with the intended effect to allow that player to determine how far back they are pulled, according to Blizzard.

== Promotion and reception ==
Lifeweaver was introduced in Overwatch 2 in Season 4 on April 11, 2023, corresponding with the Thai New Year. In a collaboration with Disc City Entertainment Co., select cafes in Japan served drinks inspired by the character and others in the Overwatch cast.

Lifeweaver was well received upon debut. Kenneth Shepard of Kotaku considered him the best video game character introduced in 2023, stating that there were not many characters that upheld the game's ideals as he did through the character's mindset that all life was worth protecting, and portrayal as a fugitive trying to do good with his technology. He additionally called him "a real shot in the arm for me" in regards to the game, and his addition helped illustrate that despite its shortcomings there was still a lot in the Overwatch series he loved. Jessica Cogswell of GameSpot meanwhile praised his "youthful energy while cracking self-deprecating jokes", and described his voice as light while she found his personality effervescent, especially as he flirted with other characters. She additionally praised how the notion of his character opposing issues that have real-world counterparts made his "optimism, openness, and bravery" a more powerful message.

TheGamer's Ashley Schofield praised that the character's sexuality was not only readily in dialogue but also illustrated his "flamboyant plant-based design". Shepard for Kotaku also examined his design, stating that there "an elegance to the way he presents himself and speaks" present in his character. He felt that several aspects of his appearance, such as his open shirt and flowing hair all helped illustrate a queer identity, with the large pink lotus in particular serving as a loud and vibrant certerpiece. He compared this to the design of another Overwatch character, Soldier: 76, who had previously been revealed as gay. Shepard felt that Lifeweaver's design in contrast to 76's help illustrate a spectrum of what queer masculinity could be in regards to character design.

The character has also been discussed in regards to representations of LGBTQ characters in video games. Cat Bussell of TechRadar praised how he felt like a departure from other Overwatch characters in that his sexuality was represented in-game through dialogue, calling it gratifying. Michael Winkel in another article for TechRadar added that he felt Lifeweaver's introduction could allow for more inclusivity, emphasizing his surprise in discovering Soldier: 76 was gay, something he attributed to the fact that Overwatch never openly acknowledges or references the subject of 76's sexuality in-game. In contrast, Lifeweaver's pansexuality was a more direct part of his character and readily referenced, and something Winkel felt could work as a backdrop to normalize the existence of such. Meanwhile, Schofield in her own article pointed out that while Lifeweaver was a step forward for Blizzard in terms of LGBTQ representation, his debut coincided with the announcement of a civil suit against Blizzard, which had led some to believe it may have been intended as a shield to protect Blizzard's image.
