= List of Drop Dead Diva characters =

This article lists the cast and characters in the American fantasy legal television series Drop Dead Diva, which debuted on Lifetime July 12, 2009.

== Cast ==
Main cast of Drop Dead Diva
Actor	Character	Season					
Actor	Character	1	2	3	4	5	6
Brooke Elliott	Jane Bingum	Main	Main	Main	Main	Main	Main
Margaret Cho	Teri Lee	Main	Main	Main	Main	Main	Main
April Bowlby	Stacy Barrett	Main	Main	Main	Main	Main	Main
Kate Levering	Kim Kaswell	Main	Main	Main	Main	Main	Main
Jackson Hurst	Grayson Kent	Main	Main	Main	Main	Main	Main
Josh Stamberg	Jay Parker	Main	Main	Main	Main		
Ben Feldman	Fred	Recurring	Main (Note: Ben Felman is credited as a special guest star despite being a series regular.)	Main	Special Guest Star		Special Guest Star
Lex Medlin	Owen French			Recurring	Main	Main	Main
Carter MacIntyre	Luke Daniels				Main	Guest Star	
Justin Deeley	Paul					Main	Main

Cast Notes

== Jane Bingum and Stacy Barrett ==
Character	Actor/actress	Starring seasons	Recurring seasons	Episode count
Jane Bingum/Deborah "Deb" Dobkins	Brooke Elliott	1, 2, 3, 4, 5, 6	—N/a	78
Brooke Elliott Prior to the start of the series, Jane Bingum was a hard working, intelligent lawyer whose best friend was her assistant, Teri and was often teased by her co-worker Kim Kasswell due to her size. In the pilot episode, Jane was shot by a disgruntled gunman who was angry at Parker for sleeping with his wife. At the same time, when Deb pressed the return button in Heaven, her soul entered Jane's body and she struggles to balance her identity along with the Old Jane's. When Deb took over her body, she was equipped with all of Jane's legal smarts but none of her memories. Deb/Jane usually avoids suspicion by claiming the shooting affected her memory. Initially, Deb struggled to adjust to Jane's size 16 body by refusing snacks and being horrified when she found out Jane is eight years older. However, she quickly made peace with her new body by updating Jane's wardrobe, eating snacks, and becoming less self-absorbed. She is pleased that as Jane she can make a difference in people's lives. Over the course of the series, we learn more about Jane's early life: she once appeared in a weight loss commercial, which proved to be embarrassing when the firm was asked to sue the company; Jane was unnoticed in high school and went to prom with a gay classmate; and Jane has an excellent singing voice. Also, unlike Deb, Jane is distant with her parents, something Deb tries to remedy and eventually succeeds with Elaine. As Jane, Deb is passionate in the courtroom and tries to fight for what is right as much as she can. At the beginning of the series, the only people who knew about Jane's true identity were Fred, Jane's guardian angel, and Stacy, Deb's former best friend. Complications arise when Deb's former fiancée Grayson Kent also comes to work for the law firm. In the beginning, Jane struggled to watch Grayson move on, especially when he began dating her co-worker Kim Kasswell. She was forbidden from telling him her true identity by Fred, who warns her that she is already in trouble for being back on Earth in the first place. A romance between Grayson and Jane starts to develop but is interrupted when Jane's husband Ethan arrives. As it turns out, Ethan and Jane only married so he could get insurance for his cancer treatments but Jane was truly in love with him and was hurt when Ethan left. Deb becomes surprised when she starts to channel the real Jane's emotions when Ethan returns. However, she soon shows her disgust towards Ethan and tells him to get lost. Jane also dates Tony, a fellow lawyer, who asks her to move to Washington, D.C., with him. Jane, however, turns him down as her life is with the firm. After Tony moves away, Jane resumes her romantic feelings for Grayson, who begins dating Vanessa Hemmings. In the second-season finale, Grayson tells Jane that he is planning on proposing to Vanessa and wants Jane to be his best man. Hurt, Jane storms out and when Grayson attempts to follow her, he gets hit by a car. When Jane rushes over to him, he says Deb's name. In the third-season premiere, Grayson is revealed to have survived with minor injuries although he has short-term amnesia. Jane agrees to be his best man and gives up any hope of telling Grayson who she truly is. She briefly dates Grayson's neurosurgeon, Ben. In season three, she finds a new flame in Judge Owen French but complications when arise when Stacey tells Grayson about Jane's true identity and it turns out that Owen's sister Olivia and Jane feuded in college, something of which Deb also tries to remedy. However, the two work out their differences and Olivia gives her blessing to the relationship. He asks her to come to New Zealand but she turns him down to go to Italy by herself. Owen follows her to Italy and eventually proposes. The two become engaged, with Jane not knowing that Grayson has fallen in love with her. Owen has a heart attack and offers to break the engagement but Jane insists on staying together, regardless of his health problems. In the fourth season, Jane is called back to Los Angeles to help Kim sort out the firm's financial problems and begins planning her wedding. She misses her own mother so she attempts to reconcile with Jane's mother, Elaine. On the day of her wedding, Grayson declares her love for Jane and the two kiss and Owen sees them, which causes him to have another heart attack. Up in Heaven, the real Jane uses the opportunity to press the return button to reclaim a body. However, it is later discovered that Owen recovered from his attack and he and Jane break up. In season five, Elaine returns announce her terminal illness and reveals that she knows that Jane is truly not her daughter. Jane struggles to get over Grayson and work professionally with Owen in addition with the Old Jane, who has returned to Earth . In the season finale, Old Jane tells Grayson about Jane's real identity. Jane eventually confesses to Grayson, who has some trouble accepting it. Eventually, they do start dating and get together. In season 6, when Grayson is shot, he plans to propose to Jane but dies in the hospital. He is reborn into the body of Ian Holt, a Death Row inmate whose innocence Jane proves. She helps Grayson adjust to a new life but they face trouble as Owen and Kim are convinced "Ian" is using Jane for her money and Jane is simply rebounding badly. When they confront her on how it can hurt the firm, Jane quits. In the series finale, Jane became an independent lawyer with help from Ian, and buried the hatchet with Kim and Owen now that she had found her soul mate in "Ian." Deborah "Deb" Dobkins (played in the pilot and flashbacks by Brooke D'Orsay; appeared in 9 episodes). Deb was a self-centered diva who died in a car accident. She was a typical size two blonde with the intentions of being a model on The Price Is Right. In Heaven, she was dismayed to find out that she was a 0/0--someone who wasn't truly bad nor good, just shallow. Determined to return to Earth, she pressed a button on Fred's computer. Unfortunately for her, she did not return in her original body and struggled to adjust living in Jane's body. Deb's image has shown up throughout the series in the form of memories and flashbacks. Jane later learned that a photo of her former life was photoshopped as an internet hoax by a professor's assistant when Jane represented the professor in a trial. The "Old" Jane Bingum went to Heaven after the shooting and spent the last four years in Heaven unhappily watching the way Deb has used her body. In season 4, she returns to Earth in the body of a recently deceased model named Brittney (played by Natalie Hall; appeared in 3 episodes). As Brittany, she shows up on Jane's doorstep, intent on reclaiming her life. But after seeing the good Deb has accomplished in her body and after the two team up to solve a murder case, the Old Jane gives Deb her blessing. However, she becomes upset when she finds out Elaine died and she didn't get to say goodbye, so she tells Grayson about Jane's true identity out of spite. Eventually, the Old Jane forgives Deb and leaves for Paris to start a new life, encouraged by Luke and her own strict guardian angel (whom Jane briefly sees with Brittney). Young Deb (played in flashback by Maddie Ziegler; appeared in 1 episode). In the episode "Lady Parts", while Jane represents Bobbie in a case where a dance client is suing her, Jane remembers dancing for her mom as Deb and how she wasn't able to do a dance routine and disappointing her mom. At the end of the episode, Stacy manages to procure a tape which Jane watches with Bobbie and they learned that despite falling down, Deb was able to complete her dance routine.
Stacy Barrett	April Bowlby	1, 2, 3, 4, 5, 6	—N/a	78
April Bowlby An aspiring model/actress and Deb's best friend who is one of the few people who knows about the Jane/Deb body switch. She is outgoing and sweet, although occasionally shallow and ditzy. Stacy once confessed to Jane that she worried she would be left behind as she is less intelligent than Jane. However, Stacy is much smarter than she appears—she often helps Jane with her cases by noticing small details and is a novice inventor. Stacy has had various jobs throughout the series, including running a small business from her patented inventions, writing a successful fashion blog, and eventually landing a role on a television show. Stacy is initially oblivious to Fred's feelings for her but the two eventually date but break up when her TV role causes her to act more egotistical and she cheats on Fred with her co-star. When she finds out her co-star was cheating on her, she slaps him and is sued for assault. Grayson represents her and the two kiss while working on the case. The two both realize it was a mistake, with Grayson stating that Stacy just reminded him so much of Deb. Stacy then told Grayson that she's not Deb, but "Jane is." She and Fred break up when he returns to Heaven but she loses her memories of him since he confesses that he is an angel. Stacy meets a woman named Nikki, who encourages her to open a unique bakery, after Stacy accidentally crossed a pie recipe with a cake recipe. Stacy refuses to listen to Jane's suspicions that Nikki is a con artist and is devastated when Nikki scams her out of her money. Nikki gets caught and Jane encourages Stacy to continue her dream of opening a "pakery" where she will sell "pakes", a combination of a cake and a pie. However, she encountered trouble again when a man named Jonah Pierce claimed that Stacy stole the idea from him. However, in court, Stacy is able to prove that it was her idea and is granted a patent. Stacy later sells the business to concentrate on becoming a mother via artificial insemination. She asks Jane for permission to ask Owen to be her sperm donor and the two date on-and-off throughout her pregnancy. It is later revealed that Stacy will have twins, a boy and girl, which she later gives birth to just hours before the wedding, which was postponed temporarily until they were delivered.

== Jane's guardian angels ==
Character	Actor/actress	Starring seasons	Recurring seasons	Episode count
Fred	Ben Feldman	2, 3	1, 4, 6	38
Ben Feldman The angel who was in charge of Deb's case when she arrived to Heaven. After she pressed the return button, he was demoted to be her guardian angel and work as a mail clerk in the firm to keep an eye on her. Fred lives in the Old Jane's apartment as he struggles to adjust to human life. Stacy was his first crush and he spends the majority of season one attempting to win her over. When the two finally begin dating, Fred struggles to hide his guardian angel affairs from Stacy, eventually going so far as to hire actors to play his parents a later season. During season one, Fred and Stacy share a kiss, which in turn breaks the rules of his guardianship and causes him to be called back to Heaven, erasing everyone's memory of him, including Stacy and excluding Deb/Jane. However, he returns a few episode later, revealing that he has decided to become fully human to be with Stacy, who still has no memory of him. After asking the real Jane's mother for advice about Stacy, she tells him that although he may feel like she's the one, he won't know until he sees what else is out there in the world, so he informs Jane that he is leaving to go explore the world and try to live a normal life for a while. It is later revealed in season two that even though he is human, he is still employed by Heaven and must continue to watch over Deb/Jane, so he returns as Kim's assistant to keep an eye on her. When questioned he tells Deb/Jane that he had been traveling the world but later admits he'd never really left Los Angeles as he had been assigned back to looking over her. This was not a complete let-down as eventually Fred and Stacy start dating. In season three, Stacy breaks up with Fred to date her TV co-star which hurts Fred, but doesn't stop him from wanting to propose to her. It is only after Deb/Jane tells Fred that Grayson and Stacy kissed that he is completely heartbroken. After the two break up for good, he decides to travel to world to learn more about what it means to be human, all before being called back to Heaven for eventually confessing that he is angel, again wiping everyone's memory of him except for Deb/Jane. We don't see much of Fred after this. He makes a few short appearances in season four when he mistakenly tells the real Jane how to return to Earth causing her to press the return key, being reborn in a model's body. However, when Grayson is shot and killed in season six, Fred is assigned as his gatekeeper, although Grayson does not remember him from his stay on Earth. Fred informs Grayson that he was assigned to Deb when she died and was held responsible when she pressed the return key which sent her back to Earth. He then tells Grayson that because of all his return button mistakes all the return keys were removed from the keyboards. Feeling he owes Deb for not properly guiding her in her new life as Jane by indulging in his own interests, Fred helps Grayson return to Earth by finding the one remaining keyboard with a return button. He warns Grayson that since the keyboard is the only one with a return button, he will only get one chance. Fred mentions should his superiors find out about this, he will be punished again with demotion or a worse punishment.
Luke Daniels	Carter MacIntyre	4	5	14
Carter MacIntyre Luke is a guardian angel sent to replace Fred to oversee Jane. He attempts to convince her to let go of Deb's soul and live as Jane permanently. His human cover is that he is an investor in Kasswell & Parker. He also bought the house where Jane and Stacy live so he can keep an eye on Jane. He tries to prevent Jane from telling Grayson who she really is as much as possible by sabotaging Grayson's attempt to declare his love for Jane. He and Jane often do not get along, but later made peace with each other. Luke also becomes briefly interested in Kim. He is called back to Heaven for failing to prevent Grayson from falling in love with Jane. Before leaving, Luke warns Deb that Old Jane is back and can be in anyone's body, later confirmed to be in a recently deceased model, Brittney.
Paul	Justin Deeley	5, 6	—N/a	17
Paul is Jane's third guardian angel after Luke leaves. He lives with Jane and Stacy, while also pursuing a modeling career. He takes an internship with the law firm and becomes fast friends with Teri. However, his earthy cluelessness often gets him into trouble as he tries to pursue mortal desires. In the episode "Identity Crisis", Jane tells Paul that she is going to tell Grayson about Paul being her guardian angel. Paul warns her that if she does, he will be sent back to Heaven and no one will remember him except Jane. Jane tells him she will miss him but she doesn't want to lie to Grayson. Later in the episode, Paul tells her that he gives her his blessing on telling Grayson and they say their goodbyes. When Grayson is killed and then reborn into the body of Ian Holt, Paul reveals the truth about himself and how he is now Grayson's guardian angel. Paul attempts to convince Kim and Owen that Ian loves Jane but instead makes them think Ian is using her.

== Harrison & Parker employees ==
Character	Actor/actress	Starring seasons	Recurring seasons	Episode count
Kim Kaswell	Kate Levering	1, 2, 3, 4, 5, 6	—N/a	70
Kim is an ambitious and cut-throat lawyer at the firm who has always looked down on Jane for her weight. It is hinted that Kim is actually jealous of Jane's success and smarts and the two are rivals in the workplace, always attempting to one up the other. She and Teri dislike each other and constantly make snide remarks to each other. In season one, Kim becomes interested in Grayson, much to Jane's dismay. The two eventually kiss but Kim refuses to date him because Grayson isn't ready for a relationship. In season two, Kim becomes closer with Parker after she has a pregnancy scare and the two begin to date but their relationship is threatened by Claire Harrison. After Claire sabotages Kim's court case, Kim is fired from the firm. She breaks up with Parker before she leaves. In the third season, she is working as a freelance lawyer from out of a coffee shop. Parker attempts to apologize to her and coax her back into law but she rebuffs him. When she is approached by a former client to handle her divorce, Kim re-enters law. When she threatens to take all of her clients away from the firm, Parker makes her partner to stay. In season four, Kim reluctantly promotes Jane to secondary partner to handle the firm's financial troubles while Parker is away. She and Luke date but she does not pursue a relationship with him as she is pregnant with Parker's child. However, when she tells Parker, he tells her that he is getting back together with his ex-girlfriend and makes her the new head of the firm, leaving her heartbroken. Kim refuses to let her impending motherhood keep her from being an excellent lawyer, going as so far to insist on finishing her summation via video when she goes into labor. She gives birth to a son and while recovering at the hospital, she is informed that Parker wants to sell the firm. Jane convinces Kim to block the deal and Kim agrees to fight to keep the firm. Kim would later find romance with a writer who was working as a temporary. After he is fired for posting about being part of a club that hunts for Bigfoot, Kim represented him in a lawsuit against the company, and although they would lose the case Kim and the writer would end up kissing and they became a couple. She defended Hank against a lawsuit from a man who attempted to mug her. She forced him and his lawyer to drop his lawsuit against Hank by reminding the man that since she was the victim in his attempt, Kim can make that decision to the man's fate. If she refuses the deal, it will go to court and she will make sure he receives nothing less than consecutive life sentences in prison. Kim also tells the man to apologize to her and Hank for wasting their time as they have busy schedules. She defends him again when he loses his job as a bailiff and later on helped get him a job on the police force.
Jay Parker	Josh Stamberg	1, 2, 3, 4	—N/a	52
Josh Stamberg Jay Parker is the firm's boss whose dalliance with another man's wife led to Jane being shot. He likes Jane's work ethic although he hates the way new Jane fights to always do what is right instead of just collecting billable hours. Despite his dislike for her actions, Parker does save Jane's job after she was threatened with disbarment. He is also a fan of a men's magazine article, which is where he get most of his fashion style and tips on seducing a woman. Parker and Kim begin dating in the second season but their relationship is complicated when the co-owner of the firm, Claire Harrison kisses him. Kim breaks up with Parker for cheating on her and Parker becomes enraged when he finds out Claire used the firm to commit fraud. He demands her resignation and attempts to win Kim back in the third season. When he promotes her to partner, the two resume dating. Parker's ex-girlfriend Elisa returns and he hires her as his new secretary, making Kim jealous. Eventually, Elisa reveals that he is the father of her son. When she sued him for sole custody of Eric, Parker hired Kim to counter it and she refused based on the fact that maybe it was better that he stayed away from them. When Parker learns of her pregnancy, he originally promised Kim that he would be there for her. However, when he calls, Parker admitted leaving for Toronto to form a family with Elisa, selling his share of the company to Kim and effectively ending his relationship with her. In season 5, Parker tries to sell the firm unexpectedly. However, Jane conspires with a client to make the firm too expensive for Parker to hang onto and he surrenders his partnership rights.
Claire Harrison	Natasha Henstridge	—N/a	2	2
Natasha Henstridge At the end of season two, Claire is the co-owner and 50% equity partner in the law firm. She had a romance with Parker prior to the beginning of the series and left after the romance ended. Claire returned to the firm after suing her husband for divorce. Claire broke up Kim and Parker's developing romance by kissing Parker. Parker later demanded Claire's resignation after it was revealed that Claire committed fraud to overturn a prenuptial agreement with her husband.
Grayson Kent	Jackson Hurst	1, 2, 3, 4, 5, 6	—N/a	76
Grayson was Deb's boyfriend until her death. He was planning to propose to her and was in deep mourning for the beginning of the series. He is hired by the firm, unaware that Deb was still near him in the form of Jane's body. He had a short fling with Kim and also dated a lawyer named Vanessa, although he was initially unsure about getting serious with her. However, he tells Jane that he did not want to lose another great woman and reveals his plan to propose. Jane stormed out and he followed her, not understanding why she was upset. As he followed her, he was hit by a car. When Jane ran to him, he smiled at her and said Deb's name. In the third season, Grayson wakes up from his coma although he has short-term memory loss. He eventually regains his memories but only up until he asked Jane to be his best man. He continues with his wedding plans but Vanessa leaves him at the altar as she feels he does not love her the same way he loved Deb. He shares a kiss with Stacy when he represents her in a case and confesses the reason he likes her so much is because she reminds him of Deb. When Stacy turns him down, he realizes he has feelings for Jane and finally declares his love for her on Jane's wedding day. Grayson kisses Jane at the hospital after Elaine's passing, only to be interrupted by the Old Jane, who reveals the truth that Jane was Deb all along. Grayson scolds Jane for thinking he couldn't love her as Deb in Jane's body. He tells Jane that he wants to begin their relationship anew. He was planning to propose to Jane and was shot. He survived and arrived to the hospital but the bullet in his chest caused complications, and despite efforts by the hospital staff to save him, he was pronounced dead. In Heaven, Grayson is startled to run into Fred and learns he was Deb's guardian angel. Grayson ends up hitting the "return" button and is reborn on Earth, calling Jane to let him know he is in the body of a convict in jail, Ian Holt (Jeffrey Pierce), who was wrongfully convicted of murder and was about to be executed but died before the event could take place. Jane (who later told Stacy about Grayson taking Ian's body) would eventually clear Ian of the crime before the execution and upon his release the two were reunited and restart their wedding plans. He faces trouble from those who see him as Ian as Kim and Owen believe he is just using Jane for her money. Paul does reveal he knows the truth and tells Grayson he is now his guardian angel too. It is later revealed that Teri knew of Ian's past, as it turns out that Ian was a gifted pianist while they were in high school and was responsible for ruining Teri's chances at stardom (he was supposed to help Teri audition for Star Search but showed up completely drunk to play piano and unintentionally humiliated her), prompting Grayson to allow Ian to "make up" for disappointing Teri. In the end, Grayson used Ian's talents to serenade Jane with a rendition of "It Had To Be You."
Teri Lee	Margaret Cho	1, 2, 3, 4, 5, 6	—N/a	72
Margaret Cho Teri is Jane's assistant and one of her best friends. She is never afraid to speak her mind and is one of Jane's biggest supporters at work. She often does detective work for Jane. She is also an aspiring musician and singer, and she performed at the grand opening of Stacy's "pakery". Jane gave legal aid to her brother and mother at one point in the series. However, when she tried to help Paul out with his debt by pretending to be a lawyer, she wound up in jail for impersonating a lawyer. In her time in prison, Teri discovers she has a following and decides to quit the firm to pursue a music career full-time. She was a high school classmate and friend of Ian Holt, who she holds responsible for ruining her chance at being a singer, thus prompting Grayson (who now inhabits Ian's body) to make up for the mistake, and she forgives him. In the series finale, Teri tells Jane that she'll continue pursuing her music career and turns down her offer to come back as her assistant.
Owen French	Lex Medlin	4, 5, 6	3	41
Owen is a no-nonsense, but offbeat judge, who wooed Jane after he first met her when he was presiding over a case she was handling in the third season. There were some conflicts between them as Jane still had to argue cases in front of him and the two struggled to remain professional at work. At the end of the third season, Owen asked Jane to spend a year with him in New Zealand, but she declined. Owen surprised her by joining her on her trip to Italy but because of the firm's financial difficulties, their vacation was cut short so jane could return to Los Angeles. Owen has a sister named Olivia, who went to high school model U. N. with Old Jane and still held a grudge against her for breaking her best friend's heart, as well as a younger brother named Charlie who is the black sheep of the family for being a lazy moocher. Owen was embarrassed by his brother and cut him off for good after Charlie attempted to a sue a strip club. He was previously married once and initially told Jane that he did not believe in marriage after his first divorce. However, in season four, Owen proposed to Jane and he leaves her to plan the wedding to go visit a friend but Teri uncovers evidence that proves Owen lied. Jane believes it was because he was having second thoughts about marriage and is devastated. Yet when Owen returns, he admits that he had a heart attack and was in a coma after surgery. He offers to break up with Jane so she can find someone younger and healthier. Jane insists on staying engaged, much to his delight. On their wedding day, Owen suffers another heart attack when he sees Jane and Grayson kissing. He collapses and the wedding is called off. The season four finale left ambiguity as to whether Owen had died and been inhabited by the spirit of the old Jane. In season five, it was revealed that 'old Jane' did indeed return to Earth, but that she never entered Owen's body - he survived the heart attack and eventually recovered. Jane attempts to reconcile with him but Owen refuses all her apologies. Shortly after, Kim approaches Owen about becoming a partner in Harrison-Parker and he agrees, becoming Jane's new boss. He assigns Jane cases specifically targeted to make her feel guilty, such as the case of a woman suing her fiancé who jilted her. Later in the season, Owen accepts Jane's apology and also tells her that he is sorry for treating her poorly at work. Owen is approached by Stacy to be her sperm donor and he accepts. The two date on and off throughout her pregnancy and when he learns that she is having twins, he tells her that he wants to part of her life with the children and proposed, although in the series finale they postponed the wedding so the twins can be born after Stacy goes into labor and delivers.

== Other legal professionals ==
Character	Actor/actress	Starring seasons	Recurring seasons	Episode count
Hank	David Berman	—N/a	1, 2, 3, 6	4
Old Jane dated Hank before she was shot. Later in the first season, Hank tried to restart their relationship; however, new Jane was not interested. During the second season, Jane and Stacey invite Hank to have dinner at their house as a guise for a date. However, Hank brings his new girlfriend to the dinner leading to an awkward evening of conversation. Hank later described it as the best night of his life. In the fifth episode of Season 3, "Prom", he went to Teri and asked her if she could get Jane to help him with a legal case involving his current wife, Irina, leaving him after two months being married. Teri suggested that Hank ask Grayson to help him instead because he's dealing with a similar heartbreak from his previous bride, Vanessa, leaving him at the altar. After telling his story on how he met Irina and despite Kim's warning, Grayson agrees to take the case. After winning his case, Hank begins dating Teri at an alternate prom hosted by Jane and Stacy. Hank appeared again saving Kim in his superhero alter-ego form from a mugger. Later Hank is being sued for assault charges, Kim forces the mugger to drop the lawsuit against Hank. Hank loses his job as a bailiff and later joins the police force.
Vanessa Hemmings	Jaime Ray Newman	—N/a	1, 2, 3	10
Jaime Ray Newman Vanessa is a lawyer at Dewey and Pearce. She met Grayson and Jane while defending Confetti from murder charges. Grayson and Vanessa hit it off quickly romantically. Jane, who still harbors intense romantic feelings for Grayson, was very envious of their relationship. At the end of season two, Grayson proposed marriage to Vanessa who accepted. Within the show's universe, Vanessa's father is a judge sitting on the United States Court of Appeals for the Ninth Circuit. Vanessa left Grayson at the altar because she felt he could never love her the way he had loved Deb. Vanessa returned to represent a couple in a case against a client that Kim was representing (which Vanessa would lose), and later apologize to Grayson for dumping him at the altar.
Tony Nicastro	David Denman	—N/a	1, 2	8
David Denman Tony first appears as a charming lawyer who works for Bogart and Markov. He seems to be very interested in Jane, and, although she still has feelings for Grayson, Jane agrees to move on and accepts Tony's request to go out. Their relationship starts off well with Tony asking Jane to spend some time at a Bed & Breakfast in Napa with him after only a few dates. Jane, at first, is wary about being intimate with a man in her new body but accepts his invitation anyway. Tony is also eager to represent Jane at her disbarment hearing but later turns her down when he learns she was married to Ethan during the course of their relationship and that she was married to Ethan so he could be on her insurance. Tony says he can't represent her anymore because now he knows about her insurance fraud and he tells her that they need to take things slow. Jane is very hurt about him not returning her calls and finds out where is having lunch and storms in on Tony having lunch with a slim, blonde woman, believing them to be on a date. After confronting Tony and essentially embarrassing herself in front of them, Tony later angrily informs her that that was a job interview and she probably ruined his chances at getting the job. He then breaks up with her for good. The two then enter a very heated battle in court when Tony represents a man being sued for having two wives at the same time while Jane represents the women but in the end Jane wins the case. They then make up and their relationship heats up again only to be ended when Tony tells her that he got the job in Washington, D.C., and asks her to move with him but she declines.
Judge Madeline Summers	Rosie O'Donnell	—N/a	1	4
Rosie O'Donnell Summers is a no nonsense judge who employed Jane as her law clerk after Jane graduated from law school. Despite their professional relationship, Jane and Madeline are personal friends. They have a running Scrabble competition, and during the episode "Make Me a Match", after the old Jane had encouraged Madeline to buy an online personals subscription, but having no luck, new Jane urges Madeline to sue the company to get her $25,000 back and represents her in the case. During the trial, Jane discovers Madeline high expectations of men after looking for another man like her late husband.
Judge Rita Mayson	Vickie Eng	—N/a	1, 2	10
Mayson appears in several episodes as a fair judge in several Harrison Parker cases.
Judge Warren Libby	Gregory Alan Williams	—N/a	1, 2, 3	15
Another judge who frequently presides over Harrison Parker cases.

== Jane's family ==
Character	Actor/actress	Starring seasons	Recurring seasons	Episode count
Ethan	Devon Gummersall	—N/a	1	2
Unknown to New Jane, Ethan is Old Jane's husband. Old Jane married him when he was unemployed and diagnosed leukemia, because she knew it was the only way to provide him with insurance coverage. New Jane meets him when he came back to ask for a divorce. She is at first fine and tells him that she'll draw up divorce papers and sign them but she starts to think that the reaction she has towards him is attraction and becomes confused as she is dating Tony. Fred makes her realize that it isn't love that is making her feel that way but anger and Jane reprimands Ethan for how he treated old Jane, how he just used her and tells him to get his own lawyer.
Elaine Bingum	Faith Prince	—N/a	1, 2, 3, 4, 5	6
Elaine is Jane's mother. Her parents divorced after Elaine's bipolar disorder caused her to behave erratically. She has also shown to be helpful at times in important cases, evident in Season 4's Crushed when she asked Jane to help out with a case involving a former babysitting charge being accused of murder. When Jane learned there was more than meets the eye, she asked Elaine for help in what happened to Chloe's dad that led to Peg barring her from seeing both her daughters again. When she told Jane about it, Elaine learns the truth of Mr. Surnow's real fate when she notified the police to search the backyard of the Surnow's home. In the season five finale, Elaine comes to Los Angeles, falling ill and it turns out she has a terminal brain tumor. On her hospital bed, she reveals she's always known Deb wasn't really Jane but is still proud of her as her daughter before dying.
Henry Bingum	Kurt Fuller	—N/a	1	1
Henry is Jane's father. Her parents divorced and Jane had a close relationship with her mother but lost contact with her father until Elaine was arrested for disorderly conduct.
Bobbie Dobkins	Sharon Lawrence	—N/a	1, 2, 3, 4, 5	6
Sharon Lawrence Bobbie is Deb's mother. Jane has represented Bobbie in several cases involving her parents getting divorced where Grayson represented Deb's father, also led her to remember more of her own past life as Deb. In "Lady Parts", when Bobbie was sued by a mother whose daughter, Kiera, is a student at her dance school. Jane learns about a 911 call that was made outside Bobbie's dance studio and Kiera makes a tearful confession that she never shared her mother's passion for dance. She wanted to skateboard with her friends and asks her to drop the charges against Bobbie. Later on, Stacy manages to procure a tape which Jane watches with Bobbie and they learned that despite falling down, Deb was able to complete her dance routine. In the episode "Guess Who's Coming", Jane represents Bobbie again after Bobbie is arrested for hiring a male prostitute while not knowing he was a prostitute. Bobbie didn't technically pay for him but offered him dance lessons which the opposing council said was solicitation. Jane discovers later that Bobbie had a procedure done to enlarge her G-spot and every now and then she gets a rush of sensation. Jane uses it as a defense and says her client was suffering from heightened sexuality and was unable to make sound judgment. The judge accepts it and the case gets thrown out.
Joe Dobkins	Mark Moses	—N/a	1	1
Deb's father. He and Bobbie sought representation at Harrison and Parker when they chose to divorce. Jane eventually discovered the truth from Grayson that they stayed married for Deb's benefit, despite their mutually unsatisfying marriage.
Sam Colby	Leelee Sobieski	—N/a	2	1
Sam is Bobbie's daughter and Deb's half-sister. Sam developed "Rainbow Nailpolish," which changes color under high-intensity light. Bobbie arranged for Jane to intervene when Sam was accused of stealing computer equipment from her employer.

== Other supporting characters ==
Character	Actor/actress	Starring seasons	Recurring seasons	Episode count
Dr. Bill Kendall	Ben Shenkman	—N/a	3	5
Dr. Kendall is a neurologist that tended to Grayson after he was hit by a car. The Doctor and Jane share a fleeting moment of attraction and date a few times. But the relationship ends when Dr. Kendall reveals that Jane is one of several women he's dating.
Elisa Shayne	Brandy	—N/a	3, 4	5
Brandy Elisa Shayne was a registered nurse who originally hired Parker to represent her in a case against a company that was withholding money to help pay for her father's medical bills. It also turned out that she also had an affair with Parker eight years earlier, so he had Jane represent her in the case, which she later won. However, Elisa also had to turn in her license to practice nursing because she illegally went to Canada to buy prescription pills for her father, and is awaiting a decision from the medical board to see if she will continue nursing. Seeing that she needs a job until that matter is settled, Parker decides to hire her as an assistant, thus making Kim totally jealous. When Parker learns that Kim had Elisa stay late at the office, he put his foot down and told Kim that Elisa will only answer to him. But this may have revealed that Parker hasn't gotten over his feelings for Elisa. Further complicating things, Elisa has a son, Eric, who has yet to know who his father is. When Jane asked Elisa how old the boy was, Jane knew it was Parker's, but Elisa wanted to keep the child a secret from Parker and asked Jane to do the same, knowing the consequences of what would happen if Parker found out. Unfortunately, Parker later learned the truth after he went to the hospital to see Elisa, and he became angry with her for hiding this secret from him. This prompted her to abruptly quit the firm and move back to Chicago with her son. Kim eventually convinced Parker to go after her and their son, leading Parker to make her partner so that she could take charge while he was away. (Kim had also threatened to quit and take her clients with her unless Parker made her a partner.) Elisa returned in season four when Eric disobeyed her orders and went to the firm to see Parker, telling her he wanted to be a lawyer. Elisa brought her own attorney over to Parker with intent to sue him for full custody of Eric and live in Toronto away from him. When Parker countered it by having Kim as his lawyer, she even agreed with Elisa it is in the best interest that he stayed away from her and Eric. It's presumed that Parker headed to Toronto to reconcile with Elisa and start their family.
Eric Shayne	Jaden Harmon	—N/a	3, 4	5
Eric Shayne is the son of Elisa and Parker, which Parker discovered eight years after Eric's birth.
Nikki LePree	Kim Kardashian	—N/a	4	4
Kim Kardashian Nikki LePree is a so-called "love guru" whom Stacy befriends when asking for advice about Fred coming back with another love interest in Season 4. Nikki becomes fast friends with Stacy, and goes as far as convincing Stacy to start a business venture selling her "pake" creations. This so-called "friendship" was viewed with suspicion from Jane when Nikki asked both Jane and Stacy to invest $10,000 into this deal. However, as they were about to go over the deal, Grayson discovered that Nikki had fled two previous residences in a seeming rush, leading him and Jane to believe that Nikki was a con artist who was scamming Stacy. Nikki made up a story that she had left her last home because of an abusive boyfriend, which resulted in Stacy turning on Jane for not believing in her dream. But the partnership abruptly ends when Nikki turns out to truly be a scam artist, taking Stacy's money and leaving town. She would eventually get caught and ends up in jail after she used Stacy's identity, which was later traced back with a record of traffic violations that Stacy had forgotten to pay.

== Celebrity guest stars ==
Many celebrities have made guest appearances on the show.

Actor	Character	Episode(s)	Notes
Paula Abdul	Herself	5	She appears in some of Jane's dream sequences.
Candice Accola	Jessica Orlando	"Begin Again"	Sister of Tina Orlando; see Mackenzie Mauzy. Member of fictional band Confetti accused of murdering their agent. She made a deal with the ADA to plead guilty in exchange for testifying against her sister. Jessica was represented by Vanessa Hemmings.
Clay Aiken	Tyler Callahan	"Prom"	One of Irina's ex-husbands whom was involved with her in a scam to rip off Hank from his money. Though he claimed he was unemployed, Grayson was able to prove his guilt that lead to Callahan confessing.
Louis Van Amstel	Himself	"The Wedding"	
Diedrich Bader	Wallace Haft	"The Chinese Wall"	
Lance Bass	Jamie	"Prom"	
Amanda Bearse	Judge Jodi Corliss	2	Judge Corliss presided over two cases. One of which involved a mail order bride scam to rip off Hank "see Tyler Callahan".
Brigid Brannagh	Molly Hagen	"Secret Lives"	Molly is a woman whose deadbeat husband wins a fortune at a casino, only to hide it from her while filing for a quickie divorce. (Based on a true story.)
Delta Burke	Tessa Wells	"Make Me a Match"	One of two sisters in a legal dispute over the inheritance of their dead father. Both sisters work a psychics and are stuck in a bitter sibling rivalry. Grayson resolves the issue by encouraging the sisters to use their "powers" contact their father. See Liza Minnelli (Lily Wells).
Sandra Bernhard	Judge Ada Brown	"Secret Lives"	Judge who sympathizes with Molly's situation. See Brigid Brannagh (Molly Hagen)
Vivica A. Fox	Maria Ellis	"The Long Road to Napa"	Maria Ellis discovers that her husband, Charles, is married to another woman named Emily Parcelles. Both women team up to expose him, and are both represented by Jane.
Jorja Fox	Marianne Neely	"Second Chances"	
Elliott Gould	Larry Baxter	"Second Chances"	
Nancy Grace	Herself	4	Appears on her actual show Nancy Grace, and is either talking about a case Jane is in or interviewing Jane, to which she accidentally knocks Nancy out.
Kathy Griffin	Jenna Kaswell-Bailey	"He Said, She Said"	Kim's Sister
Tim Gunn	Himself	"Second Chances"	Gunn appeared in a dream sequence where Jane practiced telling Grayson her true identity.
Jasmine Guy	Judge Nona Daniels	"Last Year's Model"	Judge Daniels supervised the sexual harassment trial of Charlotte Perkins. See Lauren Stamile
Gregory Harrison	Brandon Tharpe	"Crazy"	
Star Jones	Judge Grace Lyford	"Pick's & Pakes"	Judge Lyford supervised the patent case for the pake between Stacy and Mr. Pierce see Jonah Pierce. After giving Stacy the patent for the pake, she tells Pierce off that no one likes a "Patent Troll" and will have him charged for fraud, even review his patent claims.
Ricki Lake	Susan Semler	"Back from the Dead"	Selmer wrote an advice column for young adult professional men under the pen name Jonathan Noble. Parker personally defended Semler when she sued to protect her intellectual property. After Parker used "Noble's advice" to woo Semler, she killed off the character and began writing under her own name.
Chad Lowe	Daniel Porter	"Back from the Dead"	Porter suffered a psychogenic fugue after a plane crash and emerged from it just before a judge declared him dead. When Daniel attempted to reunite with his wife, she sued him for divorce. He pressed for custody of their son until he discovered that it was his second fugue state. Daniel then withdrew his contest and lets his wife have full custody of their son. Before leaving, he and his mother explained to Jane that it was for the better that he withdraws now than to abandon his son again. Once they return to Seattle, Daniel and his mother intends to visit a specialist dealing with his condition so he would have a better understanding of it.
Cameron Mathison	Jonah Pierce	"Pick's & Pakes"	Jonah Pierce is a "patent troll" who took Stacy to court and sued her for the patent on the pake, claiming he invented it. He was later exposed for his scam during the taste test of his pake that allowed Stacy to have the patent for the pake. see Judge Lyford.
MacKenzie Mauzy	Tina Orlando	"Begin Again"	Sister of Jessica Orlando; see Candice Accola. Member of fictional band Confetti accused of murdering their agent. Jane cleared Tina's name by tying a rival singer to a CD found in the murdered man's boom-box.
Liza Minnelli	Lily Wells	"Make Me a Match"	See Delta Burke (Tessa Wells)
Kathy Najimy	Claire Porter	"The Magic Bullet"	
Kelly Osbourne	Joyce Keck	"Jane's Getting Married"	
Jake Pavelka	Toby Davlin	"Good Grief"	Toby Davlin, a suitor on Finding the One, a dating show whose producer is being sued for "intentionally inflicting emotional harm" when Toby spurns one bachelorette for another.
Teri Polo	Jillian Ford	"The Magic Bullet"	
John Ratzenberger	Larry Kaswell	2	Kim's Dad
LeAnn Rimes	Lana Kline	"Hit and Run"	See Nick Zano (Tim Kline)
Cybill Shepherd	Ellie Tannen	"Queen of Mean"	Tannen is a high-end fashion designer who is famous for her reputation as a "total monster." She sues a former assistant who wrote a book that would have disclosed Tannen's degenerative eye disorder.
Lauren Stamile	Charlotte Perkins	"Last Year's Model"	Perkins is a pharmaceutical sales representative who was demoted to customer service. Perkins sued for sexual harassment. Jane and Kim alleged that Perkins’ company maintained a workplace that encouraged female sales reps to dress provocatively and flirt with doctors, which Perkins refused to do. Perkins won a multimillion-dollar settlement.
David Sutcliffe	Charles Ellis	"The Long Road to Napa"	See Vivica A. Fox (Maria Ellis)
Wanda Sykes	Judge Yvonne Wright	"Prom"	A surly judge presiding over the case of a teenage woman being kept from her high school prom because she's a lesbian and wants to bring a female date.
Gina Torres	Diana Hall	"Make Me a Match"	
Steve Valentine	Henri Malik	"The Dress"	
Nia Vardalos	Lisa Shane	"What If?"	
Wendy Williams	Judge Mary Rudd	"Hit and Run"	Judge Rudd presides over a "booty call" case
Chuck Woolery	Himself	"Do Over"	He appears in one of Jane's dreams as a gameshow host
Nick Zano	Tim Kline	"Hit and Run"	Appears as a famous actor accused of a hit and run that leaves a child dead. His wife, Lana, plays a key witness in his case. See LeAnn Rimes (Lana Kline)
