= Drop Dead Diva season 3 =

Drop Dead Diva
- Season 3
- DVD cover
- No. of episodes: 13

Release
- Original network: Lifetime
- Original release: June 19 – September 18, 2011

Season chronology
- ← Previous; Season 2 Next → Season 4

The third season of Drop Dead Diva premiered on June 19, 2011, and concluded on September 25, 2011, on Lifetime. Season three aired on Sundays at 9:00 pm ET and consisted of 13 episodes.

== Episodes ==
No. overall	No. in season	Title	Directed by	Written by	Original release date	U.S. viewers (millions)
27	1	"Hit and Run"	Jamie Babbit	Josh Berman	June 19, 2011	2.86
While she waits for Grayson to wake up from his coma, Jane is assigned a case about a pair of celebrities who were both charged with a hit-and-run involving a 13-year-old girl. The case gets more complicated when the girl dies in the hospital. Meanwhile, Kim takes a case from one of her former clients who has just gotten divorced.
28	2	"False Alarm"	Michael Grossman	Alex Taub	June 26, 2011	2.38
Grayson wants Jane's help planning his wedding with Vanessa. Kim's new case revolves around a model who died during surgery. Parker takes a case about Teri's boyfriend. Fred loses his virginity to Stacy.
29	3	"Dream Big"	Martha Coolidge	Rob Wright	July 10, 2011	2.01
Jane takes over the case of a woman who is reluctantly suing a sperm bank due to her resulting child being a "little person". Fred hires an actress to play his mother for a lunch with Stacy. Grayson helps a stripper with a legal matter, and later finds out that Vanessa's father will be presiding over the case.
30	4	"The Wedding"	Kevin Hooks	Sandy Isaac	July 17, 2011	2.27
Grayson and Vanessa's wedding doesn't go as well as planned. Jane finds the real reason why a gunman held her at gunpoint and reluctantly decides to represent him in court, but he goes against her legal advice. Meanwhile, Grayson's new case revolves around a "rogue camel milker".
31	5	"Prom"	Jamie Babbit	Sarah McLaughlin	July 24, 2011	2.08
Jane takes over the case of a teenager who was denied access to her prom due to her sexual orientation; a casting director attempts to get Fred into an energy drink commercial, which causes Stacy to become jealous; Grayson and Kim help represent Hank, Jane's former love interest, in a case about a mail-order bride scam.
32	6	"Closure"	Michael Grossman	William N. Fordes	July 31, 2011	2.09
After being deputized as a DA, Jane/Deb meet one of Jane's exes, a corrupt DA; Grayson represents Stacy on a lawsuit regarding her blog; Parker begins to suspect that Kim is dating, so he orders Teri to check it out.
33	7	"Mothers Day"	Kevin Hooks	Jeffrey Lippman	August 7, 2011	2.36
Jane's and Deb's mothers fight over Jane's attention on a separate legal matter; Kim advises Fred on how to improve his relationship with Stacy.
34	8	"He Said, She Said"	Tim Matheson	Amy Engelberg & Wendy Engelberg	August 14, 2011	2.39
Jane and Grayson are at odds when she represents a college student who accuses a star football player from Grayson's alma mater of rape; Kim helps her sister Jenna in her divorce settlement; Jane finds herself in an awkward position when she advises Parker and Bobbi (Deb's mother) in their relationship.
35	9	"You Bet Your Life"	Dwight Little	Rob Wright	August 21, 2011	2.23
Jane helps Deb's former sorority house mother Kristin prove that the casino in which she lost all of her money has created an environment of intoxication; Kim and Parker represent a botanist who has cultivated a rare flower; Fred takes a down-and-out Grayson on a "guys night out".
36	10	"Toxic"	Michael Schultz	Sandy Isaac & Sarah McLaughlin	August 28, 2011	2.53
Jane puts her own job in jeopardy by taking a case against one of the firm's biggest clients. Meanwhile, Teri asks Kim to represent her against a motivational speaker that she has despised since childhood, Fred becomes jealous of Stacy's relationship with her TV co-star, Brian, and Grayson's new relationship is about to hit a roadblock thanks to Jane.
37	11	"Ah Men"	Robert J. Wilson	Adam R. Perlman	September 4, 2011	1.93
Parker is visited by an old flame, Elisa, who wants to sue her father's life insurance company after they refuse to pay out his policy. When Jane is asked to represent her, she learns what really happened after Parker's relationship with Elisa ended; Kim represents a reverend who has a controversial way to help the poor; Fred decides it's time for Stacy to confirm they really have a relationship after she spends more time with her on-screen co-star.
38	12	"Bride-a-Palooza"	Michael Grossman	Amy and Wendy Engelberg & William N. Fordes	September 18, 2011	2.18
Jane takes the case of a law student whose fiancée was trampled by other brides during an off-the-rack bridal gown super-sale. Meanwhile Kim and Grayson take a case involving a brother and sister over the control of a medieval restaurant, Parker gets upset over Kim making new hire Elisa take on extra work, and Stacy's ride to the top of the diva chain is about to come crashing down.
39	13	"Change of Heart"	Jamie Babbit	Jeffrey Lippman & Alex Taub	September 25, 2011	2.12
A respected judge requests Jane's help in the case of a man on death row who wants to donate his heart to his ill sister. Owen wants to take Jane with him on a year-long stay in New Zealand, where he will train for and eventually sail in the America's Cup. Grayson helps Stacy when she is accused of assault against her former co-star, and Jane is heartbroken when she sees the two kiss after the trial. Realizing the kiss was a mistake, Stacy tells Grayson that Jane is Deb, leaving him heartbroken. Parker discovers that he is the father of Elisa's child and leaves the firm indefinitely to establish a relationship with his unexpected family. Kim gets her wish to become a partner in the firm, and will be in charge while Parker is gone. Jane meets Owen at the airport, but only to tell him that he inspired her to go to Milan. She sees Fred at the gate to Milan. He tells her that he wants to propose to Stacy, but Jane tells him about the kiss, and when he asks what to do now, she says that he can go anywhere. Jane gets on the plane to Milan, only to have Owen sit down beside her and tell her that he can sail anywhere, while there is only one Jane. Grayson arrives at the airport, too late to get on the plane to Milan.

== Cast ==
=== Main cast ===
- Brooke Elliott as Jane Bingum
- Margaret Cho as Teri Lee
- April Bowlby as Stacy Barrett
- Kate Levering as Kim Kaswell
- Jackson Hurst as Grayson Kent
- Josh Stamberg as Jay Parker
- Ben Feldman as Fred (Note: Ben Feldman is credited as a special guest star.)

=== Recurring cast ===
- Ben Shenkman as Bill Kendall
- Lex Medlin as Owen French, a judge
- Marcus Lyle Brown as Paul Saginaw, an assistant district attorney
- Robert Hoffman as Brian Pullman
- Brandy as Elisa Shayne
- Jaime Ray Newman as Vanessa Hemmings
- Vickie Eng as Rita Mayson, a judge

=== Guest cast ===
- Gregory Alan Williams as Warren Libby, a judge
- Jeff Rose as Doug Resnick
- Sharon Lawrence as Bobbie Dobkins
- Faith Prince as Elaine Bingum
- Rhoda Griffis as Paula Dewey
- Paula Abdul as Paula Abdul, a judge
- Brooke D'Orsay as Deb Dobkins
