= Drop Dead Diva season 5 =

Drop Dead Diva
- Season 5
- No. of episodes: 13

Release
- Original network: Lifetime
- Original release: June 23 – November 3, 2013

Season chronology
- ← Previous; Season 4 Next → Season 6

Drop Dead Diva's fifth season premiered on June 23, 2013 and concluded on November 3, 2013, on Lifetime. Season five aired on Sundays at 9:00 pm ET (6:00 pm PT) and consisted of 13 episodes.

== Cast ==
=== Main cast ===
- Brooke Elliott as Jane Bingum
- Margaret Cho as Teri Lee
- Jackson Hurst as Grayson Kent
- Kate Levering as Kim Kaswell
- April Bowlby as Stacy Barrett
- Lex Medlin as Judge Owen French
- Justin Deeley as Paul

=== Recurring cast ===
- Annie Ilonzeh as Nicole
- Marcus Lyle Brown as A.D.A. Paul Saginaw
- Gregory Alan Williams as Judge Warren Libby
- Natalie Hall as Brittney (inhabited by the real Jane Bingum)

=== Guest cast ===
- Carter MacIntyre as Luke Daniels
- Faith Prince as Elaine Bingum
- Sharon Lawrence as Bobbie Dobkins
- Jeff Rose as Doug Resnick
- Rhoda Griffis as Paula Dewey

== Production ==
A month and a half after Lifetime cancelled the Comedy-drama series, the cable network signed a deal with producer Sony Pictures Television to bring the show back for a fifth season. The news came as a reversal after Lifetime cancelled the hour-long drama in January, as talks with Sony Pictures Television for cost-cutting options to continue the series stalled. The decision to bring back the series suggests that the two sides reached a new, more cost-effective agreement. Justin Deeley joined the cast this season as Paul, Jane's new guardian angel. Investor Barbara Corcoran from ABC's Shark Tank series guest stars as herself in an episode where Stacy seeks advice on how to make her bakery profitable. Episode eight served as the summer finale on August 11, with the remainder of the season returning on October 6.

== Episodes ==
No. overall	No. in season	Title	Directed by	Written by	Original release date	U.S. viewers (millions)
53	1	"Back from the Dead"	Robert J. Wilson	Josh Berman	June 23, 2013	2.15
Jane frantically searches for Owen, who went missing after seeing her kiss Grayson just before their wedding. Luke tells Jane that "Old Jane" is back on earth and could be in anyone's body, even Owen's. Jane juggles her personal challenges while representing a desperate father trying to save his eight-year-old son who is fighting T-cell Lymphoma, after the boy's cutting-edge treatment in a clinical trial is abruptly terminated by a pharmaceutical company. Meanwhile, Kim takes on the case of a woman whose ex-boyfriend posted nude photos of her on a website that is devoted to ex-girlfriend revenge. Luke tells Jane he failed to keep her away from Grayson, and therefore must return to heaven. Jane meets Luke's replacement, Paul (Justin Deeley). Finally, Jane gets an unexpected visitor, "Old Jane", who is now living as a model named Brittney.
54	2	"The Real Jane"	Michael Grossman	Josh Berman	June 30, 2013	2.14
Jane finds herself working side-by-side with "Old Jane", who is now in the body of a hot model named Brittney (Natalie Hall) and why she wanted come back to Earth in the first place. Together they race the clock to defend a former client of Old Jane's who is on death row for killing a former classmate and is due to be executed in four days. Grayson and Kim take on the case of a mild-mannered father and mattress salesman, Cyd Pinar (Lee Tergesen), who believes he was wrongfully terminated from his job for dressing like a drag queen. Brittney (Old Jane) and Jane develop respect for each other gradually during their case. When Owen steps in to replace the judge who was originally assigned the case, Grayson feels that Owen should recuse himself. Kim struggles with Parker's absence, and tearfully reveals to Grayson that Parker is trying to reconcile with Elisa, the mother of his son. Realising Jane/Deb has done better in her new life than she first believed, Brittney (Old Jane) decides to go to Paris to do as Jane/Deb has and find her true self now that she, too, has a second chance at life.
55	3	"Surrogates"	J. Miller Tobin	Jeffrey Lippman & David Feige	July 7, 2013	2.16
Kim announces a new partner at the firm, shocking Jane and Grayson. Jane struggles to keep her personal feelings aside after Owen assigns her the case of a jilted bride who is suing her former fiancé for damages. Kim and Grayson represent a surrogate mother looking for the missing parents of the child she is about to deliver. Stacy gets discouraged when she seeks advice from business mogul Barbara Corcoran about making The Pakery profitable. Jane and Stacy have a new house guest when Paul crashes at their apartment. Jane finally gets the chance to make a full apology to Owen, but it does not work out as she had hoped.
56	4	"Cheaters"	David Grossman	Amy Engelberg & Wendy Engelberg	July 14, 2013	2.10
In an attempt to be professional, Jane and Owen partner on a case of a teenage boy who has been accused of cheating on the SATs. Meanwhile, Kim and Grayson defend the owner of a dog that is accused of impregnating a prized pooch that lives next door. Jane enlists Paul to spy on Stacy when she begins acting strangely.
57	5	"Secret Lives"	Michael Grossman	Marty Scott	July 21, 2013	2.20
Jane tries to impress both Owen and the owners of a major baseball team by representing their star player when he's accused of murder. Meanwhile, Kim helps her old friend Molly (Brigid Brannagh) fight for alimony after learning that her deadbeat ex-husband recently won a huge jackpot in Las Vegas. Owen's new assistant Nicole (Annie Ilonzeh) helps Grayson mend his broken heart, while Teri advises Stacy on what to look for in a sperm donor.
58	6	"Fool for Love"	Michael Grossman	Steve Lichtman	July 28, 2013	2.15
Jane attempts to reconcile with Owen while they work together representing a professor who has been arrested for smuggling drugs. Kim goes up against Grayson's equally pregnant ex-fiancée Vanessa in a case where Kim represents a woman fighting for rights to a very successful video game she created with her recently deceased boyfriend. Stacy invites a handful of her exes to a "donor party" where she tries to assess who might be the best sperm donor.
59	7	"Missed Congeniality"	Bethany Rooney	David Feige & Jeffrey Lippman	August 4, 2013	2.15
Jane represents Miss United States when the contestant gets a hold of a memo from the Miss Universal Globe pageant owner informing her of the finalists. Only one problem: the pageant has not started yet. Kim defends her father, Larry (John Ratzenberger), as he tries to overcome legal barriers to continue coaching a youth baseball team. Elsewhere, Jane is conflicted when Stacy wants her blessing to use Owen as her sperm donor, while the office romance between Grayson and Nicole heats up.
60	8	"50 Shades of Grayson"	Michael Grossman	Josh Berman & Marty Scott	August 11, 2013	2.45
Kim and Grayson represent an erotic romance novel writer who claims a large publishing syndicate plagiarized her online novel. Kim's water breaks during the trial, and she has to present her closing arguments via webcam from a hospital bed while she is in labor. Jane represents a groom-to-be who is arrested at his bachelor party for breaking a rarely enforced "impersonating an American citizen" law while returning across the border from Mexico. A handsome lawyer at the San Diego courthouse where the trial is held asks Jane to dinner and kisses her, but he really wants to second chair her case so he can grandstand against the law. Kim has a baby boy. Jane proclaims her love for Grayson to Stacy and Teri, who both tell Jane she should waste no time in letting Grayson know. But Jane later sees Grayson kissing Nicole, and walks away. Meanwhile, an accountant who had been asking questions around the firm, presumably for an insurance assessment, reveals his true purpose to Owen and Kim: Parker sent him because he wants to put the firm up for sale.
61	9	"Trust Me"	Michael Grossman	Zac Hug	October 6, 2013	1.44
As the firm faces the possibility of being sold, Jane defends an heiress whose shelter for battered women is threatened with being shut down. The woman's brother refuses to allow her access to her trust fund, creating a legal situation where Jane seemingly botches the case. However, it turns out to be part of her plan to get the firm out of trouble. Grayson defends a young man who was removed from a flight after claiming to be a vampire. Owen finally agrees to allow Stacy to use him as a donor and the two share a kiss.
62	10	"The Kiss"	Jamie Babbit	Amy Engelberg & David Feige	October 13, 2013	1.56
While at first agreeing not to pursue a relationship after the kiss, Stacy and Owen kiss again, then agree to a date. Meanwhile, Paul sets up Jane on a date with a man he saw delivering print equipment on another floor of the office building. On her date, Jane first discovers Owen and Stacy having dinner and feels betrayed. She then returns to her table to find that her date has stolen her keys and her car. On the work front, Jane represents a woman who was injured while participating in a "spouse swap" set up by a couples counselor, Dr. Reza (Illeana Douglas). Things become complicated when it is discovered that the client was having sex with the other married man, putting Jane in the middle of a double divorce case. Jane/Deb also has to dance around the fact that Dr. Reza counseled "Old Jane" years before. Grayson and Owen help a man named Frank (David Alpay) who set himself up as his own corporation, with his shareholders voting on every aspect of his life, only to now have the shareholders vote down his plans to get married.
63	11	"One Shot"	Dwight Little	Wendy Engelberg & Jeffrey Lippman	October 20, 2013	1.77
Grayson has a new client, Marty Frumm (Richard Kind), who is getting married for the third time and wants a "love contract" put into his prenup. One of Jane's former clients named Becca (Alexandra Holden) approaches her about being in danger since she found cocaine hidden in a drawer at work. Jane brings her to a U.S. attorney's office, where they confirm that Becca's boss is working with a dangerous cartel that is likely to target her to prevent her from testifying. They want to put Becca into Witness Protection, but she refuses to do so until talking with her boyfriend Neal (Cory Hart). When Becca is shot while embracing Neal, the boyfriend becomes a suspect. But it turns out that Marty Frumm was a bogus client who was only in the offices to spy on Becca. Owen defends Ashley (Lindsay Pearce), a teenage television star being blackmailed by a photographer who snapped nude pictures of her through a hotel window. Meanwhile, the rift between Jane and Stacy over the latter dating Owen comes to a head. The truth about the teen star's nudes finally sets her free to go to Princeton, which Jane discovers was her plan all along.
64	12	"Guess Who's Coming"	Michael Grossman	Eric Buchman	October 27, 2013	1.80
Jane has to help Deb's mother, Bobbie, when she is arrested for inadvertently soliciting an undercover policeman. Things get complicated when it appears that Bobbie offered free dance lessons in exchange for sex. When Bobbie is hospitalized in what appears to be a heart condition, Jane discovered that she underwent surgery to enlarge her G-Spot, which she uses to get the charges dropped against Bobbie. Grayson travels to Wyoming to handle a divorce case for a couple that was married in California but purchased a second residence in Wyoming. It appears that the man's wife have a strong case until Grayson discovers her affair with her lawyer and the fraud she committed. The judge tells her that unless she wants to be indicted here for fraud, she better settle the divorce with her husband fairly. Jane discovers Grayson and Nicole have broken up. Meanwhile, despite Jane's recent blessing, Stacy decides to stop pursuing a relationship with Owen.
65	13	"Jane's Secret Revealed"	Robert J. Wilson	Josh Berman	November 3, 2013	1.78
Jane offers to represent an Amish farmer in a life or death legal case against a big oil company but runs across problems involving the man's beliefs not allowing him to file a lawsuit and a traitorous ally. With the help of the man's son whom he had shunned, Jane is able to win the case and save his daughter and his land. Moreover, the case brings the family back together. Grayson helps a dominatrix try to collect a debt from one of her clients. Jane's mother, Elaine, comes to Los Angeles and reveals she is dying of a brain tumor. Just before passing in her hospital bed, she admits she has known for some time that Deb is not Jane. Grayson is about to kiss Jane when the real Jane (as Brittney) shows up, angered she could not say goodbye to her mother, and tells Grayson that Jane is not who she says she is.
