= Drop Dead Diva season 4 =

Drop Dead Diva
- Season 4
- DVD cover
- No. of episodes: 13

Release
- Original network: Lifetime
- Original release: June 3 – September 9, 2012

Season chronology
- ← Previous; Season 3 Next → Season 5

The fourth season of Drop Dead Diva premiered on June 3, 2012 and concluded on September 9, 2012, on Lifetime. Season four aired Sundays at 9:00 pm ET and consisted of 13 episodes.

== Cast ==
=== Main cast ===
- Brooke Elliott as Jane Bingum
- Margaret Cho as Teri Lee
- Jackson Hurst as Grayson Kent
- Kate Levering as Kim Kaswell
- April Bowlby as Stacy Barrett
- Lex Medlin as Judge Owen French
- Carter MacIntyre as Luke Daniels
- Josh Stamberg as Jay Parker

=== Recurring cast ===
- Kim Kardashian as Nikki LePree
- Marcus Lyle Brown as A.D.A. Paul Saginaw
- Gregory Alan Williams as Judge Warren Libby

=== Guest cast ===
- Brandy Norwood as Elisa Shayne
- Ben Feldman as Fred
- Faith Prince as Elaine Bingum
- Sharon Lawrence as Bobbie Dobkins
- Rhoda Griffis as Paula Dewey
- Vickie Eng as Judge Rita Mayson
- Mary Mouser as Chloe Surnow

== Production ==
On September 22, 2011, Lifetime picked up the show for a 4th season featuring 13 episodes, which premiered on June 3, 2012. Lex Medlin who played the recurring role of Judge Owen French, has been upgraded to a series regular in season four. Carter MacIntyre also joined the main cast for season four. He plays the role of Luke Daniels, Jane's new guardian angel. Kim Kardashian will recur as Nikki, Stacy's business partner. Brandy is confirmed to be reprising her role as Elisa Shayne for season four.

== Episodes ==
No. overall	No. in season	Title	Directed by	Written by	Original release date	U.S. viewers (millions)
40	1	"Welcome Back"	Michael Grossman	Josh Berman	June 3, 2012	2.30
Jane and Owen's romantic trip to Italy is interrupted by Teri, who arrives to tell Jane that Kim wants her back with the firm to take on a lucrative murder case defending a law school classmate of the original Jane named Emily (Megyn Price). The case takes an unexpected twist when Emily's husband is put on trial. While Parker is away, Kim discovers the firm is in financial trouble. Grayson comes to grips with his recent feelings towards Jane, which causes him to start digging into what Stacy said to see if it can actually be true. Grayson then confronts Stacy about Jane being Deb. Stacy meets a relationship guru Nikki (Kim Kardashian) who helps her move on from Fred, while Fred makes a confession that can tear them apart for good. Jane meets her new guardian angel, Luke (Carter MacIntyre). Parker returns, having been unable to locate his son, and takes his office back from Kim.
41	2	"Home"	Dwight Little	Alex Taub	June 10, 2012	2.12
Stacy tells Jane that she thinks Grayson knows Jane is Deb, because he figured it out himself. Luke then tells Jane that she must convince Grayson that he is wrong. Grayson and Jane then team up on a case of a young computer game company CEO (Jake T. Austin) who wants to sue his overprotective father (Steven Culp) for emancipation, but the pending lawsuit reveals a deeper secret between father and son. Meanwhile, Kim defends her father (John Ratzenberger) in a case regarding him trespassing in one of his boss's homes.
42	3	"Freak Show"	John Murray	Rob Wright	June 17, 2012	2.17
While suspecting Nikki's intentions towards Stacy's new business, Jane/Deb takes over a case of an elderly woman named Rita (Patty Duke) who was fired from her job after tackling a stealing customer; Kim takes the divorce case of Owen's sister Olivia (Emily Rutherfurd), who doesn't have good memories of Jane.
43	4	"Winning Ugly"	Jamie Babbit	Alfonso H. Moreno	June 24, 2012	2.04
Jane handles the case of a man whose wife committed suicide after being rejected for a reality TV makeover show. The case pits her against a smooth lawyer and a blunt jury consultant whose criticism of Jane's style makes her believe it's Luke's plan to make her act less like Deb. Parker is thrown by a case of two women fighting over a rat they claim is their mutual reincarnated lover and by the appearance of his son at the firm. Using inspiration from Eddie and Elisa, Parker finally tells the two women to stop fighting over the rat. He explains that they need to move on with their own lives and claims that Ted is just nothing more than a disgusting rat who played them for fools. Stacy gets Teri to help her open her "pakery." Teri hires real help and her "pakery" opens.
44	5	"Happily Ever After"	Tim Matheson	Amy Engelberg & Wendy Engelberg	July 1, 2012	1.87
Jane dives into a bathtub -- and trouble -- after she agrees to represent a Bhutanese woman who is forced to marry a prince against her wishes, while a proposal awaits her from Owen that could have long-term implications for both Jane and Grayson. At the same time, Kim and Parker tackle a case of viral voyeurism when they defend a teacher who had posted online sex videos with his wife two years earlier. To drum up business at the Pakery, Stacy has Teri send out false tweets that a celebrity was spotted there, but the two are soon caught.
45	6	"Rigged"	J. Miller Tobin	Lynne E. Litt & William N. Fordes	July 8, 2012	2.28
Jane and Grayson have a slippery situation on their hands when they take on a case involving the death of an engineer due to a faulty oil rig. But when they soon discover that a new hire at the firm, Liz (Jessica Leigh Smith), is leaking details to the company, Jane comes up with a greasy plot to expose the leaks. At the same time, after Jane is told by Owen that he is going to visit an injured friend from college, Teri discovers that Owen had lied about making the visit and it appears that he simply slipped out of town in the wake of the marriage proposal. Meanwhile, Parker learns that Elisa is determined to keep him out of her life by seeking sole custody of their son and announcing that she is moving to Toronto, so he gets Kim to represent him while Elisa hires her own lawyer (Serena Williams). However, Parker may be fighting a losing battle with her when Kim reveals her support for Elisa to move away to start a new life and suggests he does the same.
46	7	"Crushed"	Michael Grossman	Josh Berman	July 15, 2012	2.55
While Jane is recruited by her mother, Elaine, to defend a former babysitting charge accused of murdering a fellow teenager, Teri and Stacy discover the real reason why Owen left. Meanwhile Parker, with the help of Grayson, courts a potential new investor named Gina (Mädchen Amick) in an effort to bail the firm out of financial debt. Jane soon discovers there's more than meets the eye when she learns that Chloe's mother is keeping a terrible secret that would turn her daughters against her if they learned the truth about what she did to both Brittany and their father.
47	8	"Road Trip"	Kevin Hooks	Jeffrey Lippman	July 22, 2012	2.13
Jane/Deb gets the chance to find out more about Jane's past when Jane's old law school teacher invites her and Grayson to Stanford University for a lecture. But at the same time Jane is trying to come to terms about her feelings about Owen. Meanwhile, Teri and Kim become suspicious of the firm's newest hire, Gina, after Parker asks Kim to take on a case that Gina brought to the firm. Brought in to help a law student defend a mother whose baby son was poisoned by on-the-job chemicals at the company's day care, Jane discovers a side to her former professor that jolts her—and helps her win the case. When Grayson decides to finally express his feelings for Jane, the firm is closed and the employees are accused of laundering money.
48	9	"Ashes to Ashes"	Michael Grossman	Rob Wright	August 5, 2012	2.26
A grieving woman (Rosalie Ward) with an addiction to eating her late fiancé's ashes hires Jane and Grayson to defend her in a case over her bizarre fetish against her late ex's stepmother. Jane also deals with Owen's return, in which he reveals he has a failing heart condition and is therefore not sure about going through with the wedding, even though Jane thinks they should. Meanwhile, Kim and Parker try to assess the damage that Gina did to the firm, only to have Kim discover the real reason behind it and that Parker had already known about it beforehand. When Teri asks Luke to help her launch her music career, Luke becomes skeptical about the studio that Teri wants to use. Jane and Grayson finally figure out the worst about their client's stepmother.
49	10	"Lady Parts"	Robert J. Wilson	Alfonso H. Moreno & Lynne E. Litt	August 12, 2012	2.36
Jane meets Deb's mother again, this time, defending her when sued by her dance student's mother. However, when Jane uncovers a 911 call made before the student was supposed to attend Bobbie's dance class, she makes a heartfelt confession to her mother why she wanted to quit dancing and skateboard with her friends. Grayson and Kim join forces to defend the decency of a sculpture. In the end, Bobbie takes comfort that in the video, Deb, was able to finish her routine after falling. Abby Lee Miller and Maddie Ziegler guest star.
50	11	"Family Matters"	Augie Hess	Amy and Wendy Engelberg & William N. Fordes	August 19, 2012	2.54
Jane represents the parent of a comatose girl against the promoter of a rave where minors were using ecstasy; Teri and Luke have to impersonate Jane and Owen to keep Jane's appointment to try out a wedding menu. This goes awry and Jane learns they botched up the whole thing by embarrassing a celebrity chef whose attitude both Luke and Teri don't like.
51	12	"Picks & Pakes"	Jamie Babbit	Joshua V. Gilbert & Oscar Balderrama	August 26, 2012	2.49
After an embarrassing interview with Nancy Grace, Jane is enlisted by her lawyer idol for a case but his bizarre behavior makes her worry over his mental stability. Owen soon reveals a small truth that the lawyer did that made the people on trial plead the fifth, which Jane is encouraged to use. When a man claims to have invented the "pake" and shows up with a patent, Stacy must locate Nikki to save her store. She is also upset to find that Jane is planning to move out to be with Owen. Grayson saves Stacy by having a "pake-off" in a courtroom, which exposes Mr. Pierce as a patent troll and gives her the patent. Luke is thrown when Kim reveals the reason they cannot date.
52	13	"Jane's Getting Married"	Michael Grossman	Josh Berman & Jeffrey Lippman	September 9, 2012	2.76
Jane and Grayson team up to take the case of a man whose wife, an old friend of Deb's refuses to have life-saving surgery when a brain tumor makes her smarter. Kim defends a singer after a fan claims one of her songs encouraged an attack on the singer's ex-boyfriend. Luke learns Kim's secret. As Jane's wedding day approaches, Grayson decides to reveal his true feelings for her. Meanwhile, in Heaven, the spirit of the real Jane goes to Fred to get her old life back. At Jane and Owen's wedding, Kim tells Parker that she's pregnant with his child. After confessing his feelings for Jane, Grayson and Jane kiss, but they are caught by Owen, who dies of a heart attack. Unbeknownst to Jane/Deb, the spirit of the real Jane Bingum appears to have entered into Owen's body.
