= Drop Dead Diva season 6 =

Drop Dead Diva
- Season 6
- No. of episodes: 13

Release
- Original network: Lifetime
- Original release: March 23 – June 22, 2014

Season chronology
- ← Previous; Season 5

Drop Dead Diva's sixth and final season premiered March 23, 2014, and concluded on June 22, 2014, on Lifetime. Season six aired on Sundays at 9:00 pm ET (6:00 pm PT) and consisted of 13 episodes.

== Cast ==
=== Main cast ===
- Brooke Elliott as Jane Bingum
- Margaret Cho as Teri Lee
- Jackson Hurst as Grayson Kent
- Kate Levering as Kim Kaswell
- April Bowlby as Stacy Barrett
- Lex Medlin as Judge Owen French
- Justin Deeley as Paul

=== Recurring cast ===
- Jeffrey Pierce as Ian Holt/Grayson Kent
- Kenny Alfonso as Joe Cummings
- Victor McCay as Judge Halloran
- Rhoda Griffis as Paula Dewey
- Gregory Alan Williams as Judge Warren Libby
- Virginia Williams as Belinda Scotto
- Mike Faiola as Dave

=== Guest stars ===
- Colin Egglesfield as Charlie French
- Corbin Bleu as Michael Donaldson
- Stephen "tWitch" Boss as Billy Donaldson
- Rick Springfield as Liam Matthews
- Janel Parrish as Chelsea Jones
- Roma Maffia as Judge Eileen Sears
- Ben Feldman as Fred
- Becca Tobin as Empress Katia
- Terry Fator as Greg Gerlin
- David Mazouz as Ryan Hatcher

== Production ==
On October 25, 2013, Lifetime and Sony Pictures TV renewed the series for a sixth season, which premiered on March 23, 2014. Colin Egglesfield, Virginia Williams, and Corbin Bleu guest starred in the season premiere while Rick Springfield and Jay DeMarcus guest starred later in the season. S. Epatha Merkerson and John Ratzenberger reprised their roles. Stephen "tWitch" Boss guest starred as Billy Donaldson, a man who hires Jane to help his brother, in the second episode. Janel Parrish will guest star in the fifth episode as a cheerleader who finds internet fame after her on-field meltdown becomes a viral video.

== Episodes ==
No. overall	No. in season	Title	Directed by	Written by	Original release date	U.S. viewers (millions)
66	1	"Truth & Consequences"	Robert J. Wilson	Josh Berman	March 23, 2014	1.11
Jane represents a lunch lady claiming the school board is refusing to feed poor children. When Jane takes the case to the press, it turns out that her client is actually a wanted war protester living under a new identity and Jane has to defend her. In the end, Jane manages to get her client's charges reduced from grand larceny to petty larceny and the woman is sentenced to three years in jail rather than twenty-five. The client sells the movie rights for her life and donates the money to fund her school's hot lunch program. Owen's wayward brother Charlie (Colin Egglesfield) drops by the office, claiming he was robbed at a strip club but the club is suing him for defamation after he complained on a website. Owen reluctantly helps, but learns there is more to the case than it seems which results in both Owen and Charlie facing larceny charges. Jane is able to pull some strings and get the charges against Owen dropped and Owen cuts off all contact with Charlie. Stacy goes on a date with Charlie before realizing he is Owen's brother. Jane finally comes clean to tell Grayson she is really Deb.
67	2	"Soulmates?"	Michael Grossman	Amy Engelberg & David Feige	March 23, 2014	1.16
A new attorney named Belinda is hired to take the place of Kim while she's on maternity leave. She and Grayson work together to represent a couple who suffered through a horrible sea cruise on a ship adrift for a week without power and are now going through a divorce as a result. The tables are turned when the couple is accused of piracy after admitting to stealing from the ship's food locker. The judge ultimately throws the piracy out as ridiculous while the trial brings the couple back together. In the end, Grayson figures out that the ship was in Mexican waters when the horrible events occurred and the case thus falls under the jurisdiction of Mexican law which matches American law in this case, forcing the cruise line to settle. While defending a man serving time for setting a fire that killed a store owner's wife, Jane clashes with the case's original judge: Owen. Eventually, Jane discovers evidence that the real killer is the victim's husband and presents it to the parole board. Having been convinced that he might be wrong by Jane's passion for the case, Owen arrives with further proof that results in the husband being arrested and the client being immediately released. Furthermore, Owen promises to personally take care of getting the man completely exonerated in the eyes of the law. Grayson tells Jane he is ready to date her as herself, stating that as far as he's concerned, Deb is dead.
68	3	"First Date"	Robert J. Wilson	Jeffrey Lippman & Wendy Engelberg	March 30, 2014	1.25
Belinda and Jane defend rock star Liam Matthews (Rick Springfield), accused of wrecking a hotel room, and they manage to cut a deal for him. But when Liam's band fires him over his reckless behavior, Jane helps him out only to have Belinda become furious over Jane's plan. When Belinda's interference grows, Jane persuades Kim to return to the firm early. Ultimately, after a car accident Liam is revealed to have early onset Parkinson's disease, the true source of his erratic behavior. The band's manager hid the truth from Liam and his bandmates to avoid paying more for insurance and in an attempt to get Liam kicked out of the band. After Jane reveals this in court, the manager is arrested for felony reckless endangerment as his actions have prevented Liam from getting needed treatment. Liam is exonerated and reconciles with his bandmates. Grayson takes on a developer planning to tear down a rent-controlled apartment building and evict its tenants. Grayson makes the case that graffiti from a famous artist on a building wall makes it an historic landmark. At the end of the episode, Grayson and Terri discover that the graffiti artist, whose real identity has always been unknown, was in fact their client. Rather than cash in on a small painting the artist left him, Grayson chooses to frame it. Jane and Grayson prepare for their first date.
69	4	"Life & Death"	Michael Grossman	Josh Berman & Marty Scott	April 6, 2014	1.39
Still reeling over knowing that Jane is Deb, Grayson is tense when they represent a friend of his who wants to bury his late wife in her backyard garden, while her parents insist on burying her in their family mausoleum. Jane comes up with an idea to help with the compromise: turning the home into a church. Jane and Grayson decide to join the new church and the man wins his case when he convinces his in-laws to join him as well so they can all honor his wife together. Kim meets a 12-year-old foster child (David Mazouz) who wants to be adopted, and she and Owen discover much red tape while trying to find him a family. Eventually a woman steps forward to help Owen and Kim locate the boy's birth father that leads to an emotional meeting between the boy and his father. Though his father's help will assist his adoption, the boy changes his mind in favor of living with his father. Teri helps Paul when his decision to buy a new car lands him in legal trouble.
70	5	"Cheers & Jeers"	Robert J. Wilson	Jeffrey Lippman & David Feige	April 13, 2014	1.08
Jane represents a cheerleader who had a public meltdown after being bullied by her teammates, but Jane later finds out she might be getting played by the supposed victim. Owen and Grayson help a couple whose inability to pay the city government a $75,000 fee for removal of a speed bump the father had installed might cost them their home. After several dead ends, Owen suggests that the family secede from the United States. When Paul gets into heavy credit card debt, Teri risks her job by posing as his lawyer. Jane exposes the cheerleader's scam successfully and the cheerleader is taken into custody in court, but Jane also worries about taking the next step with Grayson.
71	6	"Desperate Housewife"	Michael Grossman	Amy Engelberg & Wendy Engelberg	April 27, 2014	1.32
Grayson and Jane are assigned a case of a seemingly mild-mannered woman whose lawsuit involves national security. Their case is difficult when they are refused information on just what their client has done. With Paul's help, they are able to track down a man who may have been guilty of framing their client. Kim represents four children who were adopted by a couple just before a home makeover show gave them a free renovation, but kicked the children back into the foster system shortly after. Kim realizes the couple were just using the children to get the makeover, and tries to find a way to sue them for damages despite the fact that the children have no legal standing. The children's grandmother steps forward along with the producers and helps Kim exposes the couple for their actions. Kim makes it clear to the couple that unless they want to be charged for fraud and lose their remaining assets, they better give up the renovated home to the children's grandmother. Stacy becomes convinced her baby might be evil, but Jane helps her realize that her baby will be twins.
72	7	"Sister Act"	Robert J. Wilson	Josh Berman & Marty Scott	May 4, 2014	1.51
Jane represents a girl who needs a bone marrow transplant. It leads to complications as a nun who had promised the marrow is discovered to be pregnant and so Jane begins searching for another donor via the girl's sperm donor father. With Stacy's help she tracks down the girl's possible half-sister and goes up against the mother when she refuses. Jane looks forward to getting Teri out of jail until she's informed she has to fire her. Kim gets Stacy to babysit her infant. Owen represents a mayor who is being impeached for allowing schoolless children to stay at City Hall, the woman driven to change her ways by a terminal cancer diagnosis but complications ensue. Jane blurts "I love you" to Grayson and is afraid of where to go after that.
73	8	"Identity Crisis"	Robert J. Wilson	David Feige & Amy Engelberg	May 11, 2014	1.20
Jane wants to tell Grayson about Paul being her angel but is warned if she does, Paul will have to leave with no one but Jane remembering him. Grayson must defend a client who confessed to murder after a hard interrogation. Jane represents a transgender teen who wanted to use the boys' bathroom at his school. Stacy is concerned over Owen being too generous wanting to raise the twins. When she complains about it, Owen proposes to her and Stacy accepts. Grayson discovers his client is guilty and refuses to give evidence that would clear him. However, Owen overrules him on grounds that a lawyer's first job is defending his client even if guilty. Owen learns the truth about the killer too late: as the man goes free, the father of the woman he murdered tries to shoot him but ends up hitting Grayson instead as a horrified Jane looks on.
74	9	"Hope and Glory"	Bethany Rooney	Jeffrey Lippman & Wendy Engelberg	May 18, 2014	1.29
Grayson confides in Stacy while in the hospital that he is going to propose to Jane after his near-death experience makes him re-evaluate his life. Jane represents a community who is getting sick from the hot pepper fumes coming from a nearby hot sauce factory, but after getting the factory shut down, things get complicated when it's discovered the hot pepper fumes were not the underlying cause of the sicknesses, landing Jane and the firm in legal trouble, and fighting against the state. However, Paul and Owen help Jane out by procuring evidence against Toxic Control with a temporary permit back in 1984, the judge orders the group to clean up the site, provide fresh water for the residents and reopens the hot sauce factory (per Jane's recommendations). When Kim's father is remarried, her mother complains he used their old wedding ring for his new bride. Owen helps Kim out only to have it revealed that technically her parents were never legally divorced and are each guilty of bigamy—and her mother was wrong about the old wedding ring. When Jane goes to check Grayson out of the hospital, the bullet in his chest causes complications, but despite efforts by the hospital staff to save him, he is pronounced dead.
75	10	"No Return"	Michael Grossman	Josh Berman & Marty Scott	June 1, 2014	1.69
Jane deals with the death of Grayson as Kim presses Owen to hire a new lawyer. Kim represents a ventriloquist who had his frequent flyer miles revoked after his puppet is banned from flying. With Paul's help, Kim exposes the airline for using the hit list to poach their clientele. Jane represents a client of Grayson's in a defamation case that has her tackling some corrupt cops. Grayson meets Jane's old guardian angel Fred in Heaven, and pleads for his help to get him back to Jane. Stacy is feeling hurt and betrayed that Owen lied to her. However, Jane convinces her to give him a break and just enjoy their time together. In the end, Grayson hits the return button with Fred's help and calls Jane to let her know he's back...in the body of a convict.
76	11	"Afterlife"	Dwight Little	Marty Scott & Tyler Dinucci	June 8, 2014	1.50
Grayson is returned to Earth in the body of Ian Holt, a death row inmate who was executed for murder two minutes earlier. Jane must try to prove his innocence to save his life before he is executed once again the following day. However, they run into problems due to Grayson having no memories of whether Ian is guilty or not. Kim represents an inner-city dance troupe who claim a major pop star, Empress Katia, stole their dance routines. Kim soon learns of Katia's guilt in not properly crediting the original creators and she is forced to pay a hefty fine. Stacy becomes concerned about Owen having anxiety attacks at the mere mention of their wedding, especially when one of the attacks lands him in the hospital. After proving Ian was innocent and framed, Jane and Ian share a kiss in her house. Unbeknownst to them, they are seen by Stacy (who knows Ian is Grayson) and Owen (who does not).
77	12	"Hero"	J. Miller Tobin	Eric Buchman	June 15, 2014	1.50
Owen is upset about Jane becoming romantic with "Ian" so soon after Grayson's death, while Grayson has trouble adjusting to his new life as Ian. Jane sues a football camp on behalf of a mother whose son died during training. Kim is saved from a mugging by a man dressed as a superhero, who turns out to be a courtroom bailiff she knows well. She repays the favor by defending the man when the mugger sues him for assault, and again when he is fired by the court. Paul reveals to Grayson/Ian that he is Jane's guardian angel, and says he has also been assigned to Ian. When Kim and Owen confront Jane over worries "Ian" is using her, Jane quits the firm.
78	13	"It Had To Be You"	Robert J. Wilson	Josh Berman	June 22, 2014	1.66
Owen and Kim try to talk some sense into Jane about her relationship with Ian while Stacy is concerned about this division hurting her wedding. Meanwhile, Teri returns and realizes that Ian is a former classmate who is responsible for ruining her chances at stardom. Jane represents a couple being sued by a Japanese whaling company they were protesting, and she later finds that Owen is representing the company. Kim represents her former temp, Dave, when he is fired by his agency for his open belief in Bigfoot. Despite the two not wanting to get serious after their one date, Kim and Dave eventually share a passionate kiss. Jane stumbles upon a way to save her client from being imprisoned in Japan, and soon finds that Owen secretly led her to the information. They make up in time for the wedding. Stacy goes into early labor before the ceremony, however, and gives birth to the twins. Grayson discovers that Ian was once a good piano player, and that he ruined Teri's talent competition on Star Search by showing up intoxicated to play piano. The series ends with Grayson using Ian's musical talents to play and sing "It Had to Be You" for Deb/Jane, as the two are finally united together.
