= Drop Dead Diva season 1 =

Drop Dead Diva
- Season 1
- DVD cover
- No. of episodes: 13

Release
- Original network: Lifetime
- Original release: July 12 – October 11, 2009

Season chronology
- Next → Season 2

The first season of Drop Dead Diva premiered on July 12, 2009, and concluded October 11, 2009, on Lifetime. Season one aired on Sundays at 9:00 pm ET for the entire season and consisted of 13 episodes.

== Episodes ==
No. overall	No. in season	Title	Directed by	Written by	Original release date	U.S. viewers (millions)
1	1	"Pilot"	James Hayman	Josh Berman	July 12, 2009	2.81
Lawyer Jane Bingum gets shot by a cuckolded man aiming for her boss, Parker. Deb Dobkins, a slim model, dies in a car crash and enters the afterlife. Fred, her angelic interviewer, tells her she never did anything of moral significance. Incensed, Deb presses the "return" key on Fred's keyboard, sending her back to Earth just as Jane dies in the hospital. Deb wakes up in Jane's heavyset body and must live the other woman's life, possessing Jane's intelligence and legal knowledge—but not her memories. Jane convinces Deb's best friend Stacy of her identity and becomes her roommate. After Jane's assistant Teri affirms that Jane is a good person, she decides to use her new life to make a difference. Using Deb's knowledge, she makes over her timid client, giving her the confidence to secure a fair divorce settlement from her philandering husband. Despite sabotage by her scheming coworker, Kim, Jane earns another client a large judgment against the pharmaceutical company responsible for his wife's death. Deb's grieving boyfriend, Grayson Kent, is Jane's law firm's newest hire. Fred, as punishment for Deb's unauthorized return, is demoted to serve as Jane's guardian angel while working as the firm's courier.
2	2	"The F Word"	Ron Underwood	Carla Kettner & Josh Berman	July 19, 2009	2.46
Jane takes on the case of a waitress who was fired from her job after gaining 50 pounds. Jane/Deb is not doing too good with the case, so her boss suggests that he play the disability card. That infuriates her client and she tells him that she thought Jane/Deb was better than that. Jane then goes to the bar and investigates and finds that other people "altered" their appearances but were not fired. In the end, Deb/Jane wins the case. Grayson and Kim work on the case of a man who's getting divorce from his wife and want his kidney back.
3	3	"Do Over"	Michael Lange	Alex Taub	July 26, 2009	2.80
Jane/Deb learns that Jane's past has caught up with her when a case from the previous year is up for retrial. During the retrial a key surprise witness changes his story. Rosie O'Donnell plays the judge trying the case. She holds Jane/Deb in contempt of court and then goes to talk to her in her cell. That's when she has an idea and sends Stacy to the company they are suing. When they see Stacy at the trial, the company decides to settle. Kim and Grayson sue a psychiatrist who "cured" their client's husband of his multiple personalities, but got rid of the wrong one. At the trial, it is uncovered that the psychiatrist has been sleeping with her client. Then the old personality reappears. Rosie O'Donnell guest stars as a judge.
4	4	"The Chinese Wall"	Lawrence Trilling	Thania St. John	August 2, 2009	2.64
Jane/Deb represents Deb's mother, Bobbi, in divorce proceedings. Bobbi originally asked Grayson to represent her, but he represents Deb's dad. Jane/Deb have a very hard time dealing with the fact that one, her parents' marriage was a sham and two, that Grayson lied to her. Jane/Deb goes to her parents home and she has a moment with her father. She realizes that they should divorce. Meanwhile, Jane and Kim defend a dog-owner who believes a pet cloning company did not give the dog owner a prize-winning dog like the dog from which it was supposedly cloned. Kim and Grayson hit a wall trying to figure out the case. Kim then hires the assistants to find a loop hole, which incidentally Jane/Deb does. Featuring guest stars Sharon Lawrence, Mark Moses and Diedrich Bader.
5	5	"Lost and Found"	David Petrarca	Jeanette Collins & Mimi Friedman	August 9, 2009	2.44
Twenty-four-year-old Deb celebrates Jane's 32nd birthday while defending a client who was wrongfully imprisoned and freed a decade later. Kim and Grayson take on the case of a man who developed a web site that offers married men a way to cheat on their wives.
6	6	"Second Chances"	Michael Schultz	Jeffrey Lippman	August 16, 2009	3.06
Grayson tries to get an obituary removed from the tabloids that prematurely reports the death of his client. But as Grayson hopes that will make his client happy, he discovers that his client may need to be satisfied in some other way. Meanwhile, Jane/Deb represents a mother who goes to court for a crime committed twenty years earlier. Also, Fred reads an article about playing hard-to-get. Stacy realizes that she likes Fred and at the end of the episode, Fred shows up at Stacy and Jane's doorstep. Stacy kisses him and they go off on a date.
7	7	"The Magic Bullet"	Jamie Babbit	Shawn Schepps	August 23, 2009	2.90
Fred is sent back to Heaven after kissing Stacy. That makes Jane/Deb really miss him. Since, Fred broke a bunch of rules, Stacy's memory of Fred is completely erased. In cases, Jane/Deb represents a mother who believes her daughter became ill while following a diet, and is suing diet guru Jillian Ford. Jane/Deb find out that Jane actually did a commercial for the product. Jane/Deb go to see Jane's doctor and find that she stopped the diet after three weeks because that's how long her body could take being starved. Also, one of the meal supplements contains something that the guru can't eat herself because she had a gastric bypass. That means she's a fraud and Jane/Deb win the case. Kim is hit with a sexual harassment suit by her former assistant; Grayson and Terri come to her assistance in disposing of the case.Terri does some digging around and they find that the guy suing Kim, worked as an assistant on a case with the similar details. Grayson uses that info to win the case. Terri tells Jane/Deb that her doctor called and wants to know if she was able to confess the secret that had been making her anxious. As she goes in to see Grayson, she sees Kim and Grayson kiss.
8	8	"Crazy"	Melanie Mayron	Maurissa Tancharoen	August 30, 2009	3.41
Jane/Deb must attend Jane's high school reunion. Also, she (as Jane) has to prove that her client is competent enough to go to trial. During the trial, Jane/Deb's client wears bunny ears, takes off all his clothes, and asks a witness to marry him. Stacy helps Jane/Deb get ready for the reunion. No one seems to recognize Jane/Deb at all. Jane/Deb's date shows up and she learns that he is gay. When they talk, he gives her an idea on how to save the case. During Deb/Jane's closing her client collapses on the floor. At the hospital, Jane/Deb helps her client reconcile with her son. Grayson and Kim represent a client that caught her fiance in bed with her maid of honor. Ultimately, the bride forgives her fiancé and takes him back. Kim, hurt by Grayson's rejection rejects him when he asks her for dinner.
9	9	"The Dress"	David Petrarca	Josh Berman	September 13, 2009	3.08
Kim represents Jane on the case of a boutique store that doesn't sell plus sized clothing. Grayson represents the daughter of Parker's friend who agreed to appear in a porn video.
10	10	"Make Me a Match"	Matt Hastings	Thania St. John	September 20, 2009	3.06
Judge Madeline Stone has been looking for some romance with the help of a match-making service, but Jane/Deb soon discovers that they are also committing fraud. Meanwhile, Kim and Grayson must see if they can figure out why two sisters who are both psychics wouldn't want to share in the family business. Fred returns from heaven and becomes human so that he could still see Stacey.
11	11	"What If"	Bethany Rooney	Jeanette Collins & Mimi Friedman	September 27, 2009	2.52
Jane/Deb takes on an interesting case of a woman who feels she was switched at birth as her mom hopes to straighten out some of these issues and figure out why the client was led to believe she was switched at birth. Parker is about to go back in the court room again for the first as a lawyer for one of his oldest friends but before doing so he will need help in not being so nervous.
12	12	"Dead Model Walking"	Ron Underwood	Amy Engelberg & Wendy Engelberg	October 4, 2009	2.79
Jane represent Deb's favorite model, Christy Talbot, when she's held at a department store for assaulting a salesclerk. But the case gets more complicated after Christy is accused of murdering her husband. Grayson and Kim take a pro bono case for a widow who won't sell her house because there are too many memories of her late husband. However, the woman may have something to hide.
13	13	"Grayson's Anatomy"	David Petrarca	Alex Taub & Jeffrey Lippman	October 11, 2009	2.79
Jane risks her place at the firm after she learns that her new case, about an athlete who was injured in his surgery, is actually a fraud. Lastly, Jane finds a surprising visitor in her doorstep.

== Cast ==
=== Main cast ===
- Brooke Elliott as Jane Bingum
- Margaret Cho as Teri Lee
- April Bowlby as Stacy Barrett
- Kate Levering as Kim Kaswell
- Jackson Hurst as Grayson Kent
- Josh Stamberg as Jay Parker

=== Recurring cast ===
- Ben Feldman as Fred
- Brooke D'Orsay as Deb Dobkins
- David Denman as Tony Nicastro
- Gregory Alan Williams as Judge Warren Libby
- Vickie Eng as Judge Rita Mayson

=== Guest cast ===
- Paula Abdul as Judge Paula Abdul
- Rosie O'Donnell as Judge Madeline Summers
- Rhoda Griffis as Paula Dewey
- Sharon Lawrence as Bobbi Dobkins
- Faith Prince as Elaine Bingum

== Home release ==
Drop Dead Diva: Season One
Set details: 13 episodes; Region 1, 2 & 4 – 3-disc DVD set; Features: Anamorphic Widescreen (1.78:1); Dolby Digital 5.1 English audio; Subtitles English and French		Bonus features: Featurettes; "Rosie's Rap"; "Dropping in with Drop Dead Diva"; "Cho and Tell"; Dreamisodes; Deleted Scenes	
Release dates	Region 1	Region 2	Region 4
Release dates	June 1, 2010	June 28, 2010	June 2, 2010
