= Drop Dead Diva season 2 =

Drop Dead Diva
- Season 2
- DVD cover
- No. of episodes: 13

Release
- Original network: Lifetime
- Original release: June 6 – August 29, 2010

Season chronology
- ← Previous; Season 1 Next → Season 3

The second season of Drop Dead Diva premiered on June 6, 2010, and concluded August 29, 2010 on Lifetime. Season two aired on Sundays at 8:00 pm ET for the entire season and consisted of 13 episodes.

== Episodes ==
No. overall	No. in season	Title	Directed by	Written by	Original release date	U.S. viewers (millions)
14	1	"Would I Lie to You?"	Michael Lange	Josh Berman	June 6, 2010	3.12
Jane/Deb must deal with Jane's secret husband, while Kim testifies against her at her disbarment hearing.
15	2	"Back From the Dead"	Melanie Mayron	Alex Taub	June 13, 2010	2.87
Jane takes on a custody case where a man who suffers from amnesia and was declared dead suddenly returns after 9 years, willing to do anything to see his son. Kim and Parker represent a female writer who wants to sue the man she used to represent her pen name, Jonathan Noble, in the magazine's parties she writes for. Fred becomes Kim's assistant. Grayson organizes a gathering in memory of Deb's birthday.
16	3	"The Long Road to Napa"	Jamie Babbit	Jeremy Littman & Morgan Gendel	June 20, 2010	2.57
Jane's new case involving two women married to the same guy takes an interesting turn after she finds out that Tony is representing the cheating husband. While helping a friend with an adoption case, Kim believes that she might be pregnant with Grayson's child. Stacy makes an invention.
17	4	"Home Away From Home"	Kevin Dowling	Jeffrey Lippman	June 27, 2010	2.38
Jane and Tony's relationship is threatened by his new job in Washington. Jane helps Teri's cousin to remain in town, believing that it will be an easy case. However, there's something about Edward that neither Jane nor Teri know. Parker and Kim decide to take their relationship further. Grayson decides to sell the house he once shared with Deb while he's working on a case where a woman punched her daughter's coach for taking her off the team. The case takes an interesting turn after Jane/Deb reveals to Stacy that she once dated the coach.
18	5	"Senti-Mental Journey"	Rick Rosenthal	Jeanette Collins & Mimi Friedman	July 11, 2010	2.47
When Jane's mother, Elaine, is arrested for her behavior, Jane learns a secret that her mother has been keeping from her for the past 15 years. Teri teaches Fred how to drive. Meanwhile, Fred learns that Kim and Parker are having an affair. Grayson gets too involved in the case of a woman who claims to have been victim of a scam.
19	6	"Begin Again"	Michael Lange	David Feige	July 18, 2010	2.41
Jane and Grayson's new case involves two sisters who are being accused of killing their manager. While taking care of the case, Jane realizes that Grayson is falling for one of the sisters' lawyer, Vanessa (Jaime Ray Newman). Kim takes on the case of the owner of a bed-and-breakfast hit with a brutal online review. Meanwhile, Fred tries to make Stacy jealous by pretending to date another woman.
20	7	"A Mother's Secret"	Arlene Sanford	Josh Berman	July 25, 2010	2.59
When Deb's mother, Bobbi, asks Jane to help her by representing a family friend, Samantha, Jane discovers some secrets that Bobbi has kept hidden for a long time. Meanwhile, Kim and Grayson work together on a custody case over a pet chimp.
21	8	"Queen of Mean"	Michael Grossman	Amy Engelberg & Wendy Engelberg	August 1, 2010	2.43
Jane represents fashion designer Ellie Tannen, who wants to stop the publication of a tell-all-book that was written by a former assistant. But Jane discovers that Ellie has an ulterior motive for hiring her. Meanwhile, Kim and Grayson represent a transgender woman who is feuding with her former in-laws for her partner's property after her partner was killed in a car accident.
22	9	"Last Year's Model"	Jamie Babbit	Jeffrey Lippman & Alex Taub	August 8, 2010	2.43
Jane and Kim work together on a discrimination case after Jane brings the case to the firm. Parker reassigns first chair to Kim. Grayson takes on a case where his clients claim their house is haunted, while he also gets closer to Vanessa. Meanwhile, Fred helps Stacy get a job serving divorce papers to help her earn money.
23	10	"Will & Grayson"	David Warren	Jeremy Littman & Morgan Gendel	August 15, 2010	2.56
Jane attends a banquet honoring her services to the L.A.P.D., only for the night to be ruined when she is accused of stealing a woman's husband. Meanwhile, Grayson tries to find out why Vanessa's ex-fiancé Will's company is being undercut by another company. He also tries to find out if Will still has feelings for Vanessa.
24	11	"Good Grief"	Bethany Rooney	Jeanette Collins & Mimi Friedman	August 22, 2010	2.68
Jane and Grayson represent a man dressed as a clown in order to cope with the loss of his wife, who died in a car accident. Parker and Kim represent a producer who is being sued by a participant of his realty dating show, which leads to Kim questioning her relationship with Parker. Meanwhile, Fred decides to tell Stacy that he is in love with her.
25	12	"Bad Girls"	John Terlesky	Amy Engelberg & Wendy Engelberg	August 29, 2010	2.57
Jane represents a young girl who is being cyber bullied by one of the popular girls at her school. Jane finds out something that takes the case on an interesting turn. Meanwhile, Parker's old firm partner, Claire Harrison, returns to enlist his help in getting a divorce from her husband. But Kim takes the lead on the case. Meanwhile, Grayson moves onto the next level in his relationship when he meets Vanessa's parents.
26	13	"Freeze the Day"	Michael Lange	Alex Taub & Jeffrey Lippman	August 29, 2010	2.61
Claire Harrison tries to ease her way back into the firm, and partners with Kim on a case, resulting in Claire firing Kim from the firm. Fred gets jealous when he finds out that Stacy has booked a commercial where she has to pretend to be married and kiss her pretend husband. Meanwhile, Jane and Grayson partner on a case involving a woman who wants to be cryogenically frozen and, during the investigation of the case, they begin to think about Deb. This leads to a series of events that could bring them together or tear them apart.

== Cast ==
=== Main cast ===
- Brooke Elliott as Jane Bingum
- Margaret Cho as Teri Lee
- April Bowlby as Stacy Barrett
- Kate Levering as Kim Kaswell
- Jackson Hurst as Grayson Kent
- Josh Stamberg as Jay Parker
- Ben Feldman as Fred (Note: Ben Feldman is credited as a special guest star.)

=== Recurring cast ===
- Jaime Ray Newman as Vanessa Hemmings
- David Denman as Tony Nicastro
- Jeff Rose as Doug Resnick
- Gregory Alan Williams as Judge Warren Libby
- Brooke D'Orsay as Deb Dobkins
- Vickie Eng as Judge Rita Mayson

=== Guest cast ===
- Paula Abdul as Judge Paula Abdul
- Rhoda Griffis as Paula Dewey
- Marcus Lyle Brown as A.D.A. Paul Saginaw
- Rosie O'Donnell as Judge Madeline Summers
- Natasha Henstridge as Claire Harrison
- Skyler Day as Lana Dooley
- Sharon Lawrence as Bobbi Dobkins
- Faith Prince as Elaine Bingum
- Leisha Hailey as Hope Prentiss
- Jasmine Guy as Judge Nona Daniels

== DVD release ==
Drop Dead Diva: Season Two
Set details: 13 episodes; Region 1 – 3-disc DVD set; Features: Anamorphic Widescreen (1.78:1); Dolby Digital 5.1 English audio; Subtitles English and French		Bonus features: Featurettes; "Drop Dead Dishing: The Cast and Crew on Season 2"; "A Look Ahead to Season 2"; "Is This Her Future?"; "It Wasn't a Meeting"; "Tell the Judge You Saw a Ghost"; "There's a Little Diva in all of Us!"; "Just Hear Us Out""; Begin Again Music Video; Thunder From Down Under	
Release dates:	Region 1	Region 2	Region 4
Release dates:	May 3, 2011	TBA	TBA
