= Would I Lie to You? (disambiguation) =

Would I Lie to You? is a British game show.

Would I Lie to You? may also refer to:

== Television ==
- Would I Lie to You? (American game show), an American comedy panel quiz show that premiered in 2022
- Would I Lie to You? (Australian game show), an Australian comedy panel quiz show based on the British version that premiered in 2022
- "Would I Lie to You?", the first episode of the second season of the American TV series Drop Dead Diva (2010)

== Music ==
- "Would I Lie to You?" (Eurythmics song), lead single from the Eurythmics' fourth studio album, Be Yourself Tonight (1985)
- "Would I Lie to You?" (Charles & Eddie song), a 1992 R&B single by Charles & Eddie; rerecorded in 2016 by David Guetta, Cedric Gervais, and Chris Willis
- "Would I Lie to You", a song by Whitesnake from their fourth studio album, Come an' Get It (1981)

== Other ==
- Would I Lie to You? 2006 tenth novel in the Gossip Girl series
