= Happy Hour (TV series) =

- Genre: Sitcom
- Created by: Jackie Filgo; Jeff Filgo
- Starring: John Sloan; Lex Medlin; Beth Lacke; Nat Faxon; Jamie Denbo; Brooke D'Orsay
- Composers: Chris Allen Lee; Scott Clausen
- Country of origin: United States
- Original language: English
- No. of seasons: 1
- No. of episodes: 13 (9 unaired)

Production
- Camera setup: Multi-camera
- Running time: 30 minutes
- Production companies: Double Double Bonus Entertainment; Werner/Gold/Miller Productions; Warner Bros. Television

Original release
- Network: Fox
- Release: September 7 – November 2, 2006

Happy Hour is a sitcom that debuted on Fox in the United States and on CTV in Canada on September 7, 2006. The show starred John Sloan as Henry Beckman, a young man rebuilding his life after losing his girlfriend, his job, and his apartment. The series was produced by married duo Jackie and Jeff Filgo of That '70s Show.

Fox put the show on hiatus in September 2006, and canceled it the following May. Thirteen episodes of Happy Hour were made, of which four have aired and nine remain unaired.

== Cast ==
- John Sloan as Henry Beckman
- Lex Medlin as Larry Cone
- Beth Lacke as Amanda Pennington
- Nat Faxon as Brad Cooper
- Jamie Denbo as Tina Difabio
- Brooke D'Orsay as Heather Hanson

== Episodes ==
| No. | Title | Directed by | Written by | Original release date | Prod. code |
|---|---|---|---|---|---|
| 1 | "Pilot" | Andy Ackerman | Jeff Filgo & Jackie Filgo | September 7, 2006 | 276005 |
Henry Beckman has a girlfriend who convinces him to move to Chicago to work for her uncle. But his life is sent into a loop when she dumps him, which causes him to lose his job and to be thrown into an apartment with Larry, a man who has his own surreal opinions on life and women. Larry sets up Henry with a new job and life begins anew. Of course, one of the house rules is that every day at four is Happy Hour.
| 2 | "The Mix CD" | Mark Cendrowski | Rob Des Hotel | September 14, 2006 | 3T5352 |
Henry finds a mix CD of love songs and gets details about Larry's one true love, Molly. Amanda is concerned when a doctor in her gynecologist's office cancels a date with her.
| 3 | "Larry's Birthday" | Andy Ackerman | Lanny Horn & Josh Silverstein | September 21, 2006 | 3T5351 |
It's Larry's birthday and his friends all forgot about it. All except Henry who got him a lame camping trip as a present.
| 4 | "The Ring & I" | Unknown | Unknown | November 2, 2006 | 3T5353 |
When Larry discovers that Henry is hanging onto an engagement ring that he had planned to give Heather, he tries to get Henry to sell the ring and buy a wine refrigerator. Henry still hopes that Heather will come back to him; however he does agree to put his engagement ring to auction.
| 5 | "Crazy Girls" | N/A | N/A | Unaired | 3T5357 |
When Henry dates a girl named Shauna, Larry warns him to stay away from her. After Henry ignores the warnings he returns to Larry to help him get out of the relationship.
| 6 | "Thanksgiving" | N/A | N/A | Unaired | 3T5356 |
Tina is planning a Thanksgiving dinner, and her mother, Nannette (Jessica Walter) and sister are planning to visit. Unfortunately Henry makes too good of an impression on his mother-in-law as she puts the moves on him.
| 7 | "Boo! This Party Sucks" | N/A | N/A | Unaired | 3T5354 |
Larry and Tina host separate Halloween parties and Brad begs everyone to attend Tina's dreary party. Amanda and Heather wear identical sexy costumes to Larry's party.
| 8 | "The Election" | N/A | N/A | Unaired | 3T5355 |
With Tina and Brad's rule on the tenants' association coming to an end, Larry and Henry decide to run against them. Amanda gets bored with her doting husband.
| 9 | "The Family Affair" | N/A | N/A | Unaired | 3T5358 |
Henry's parents are coming for a visit and he fears they'll be disappointed in him. Larry and Amanda have prejudices against them. Tina gets a job but she doesn't like Brad's excitement over it. Everyone may have to rethink their opinions.
| 10 | "New Year's Eve" | N/A | N/A | Unaired | 3T5359 |
Everyone likes Amanda's current boyfriend except for Larry, who gets a 'bad vibe' from him. Although Larry always protects Amanda, he goes too far this time and hurts her feelings.
| 11 | "11:30 Snuggles" | N/A | N/A | Unaired | 3T5360 |
Larry and Brad almost get into a fight in a bar, and Henry calls the police to save them, forgetting that all three are impersonating police officers to impress women.
| 12 | "A Dead Man's Ham" | N/A | N/A | Unaired | 3T5361 |
It's Christmas and Larry's friends leave to be with their families, however they then decide to stay with him because all flights out of Chicago have been cancelled. However, at the apartment, the only food available is a mail-order ham that arrived for a neighbour who has died.
| 13 | "The T-Shirt" | N/A | N/A | Unaired | 3T5362 |
Larry's T-Shirt business soars in popularity after George Clooney is seen wearing one of his shirts, however the reverse happens with Kevin Federline. Heather then saves the business by changing the company slogan.

== Reception ==
On the review aggregator website Rotten Tomatoes, 13% of 15 critics' reviews are positive, with an average rating of 3.3/10. The website's consensus reads, "Happy Hour is a cheap, unoriginal, laugh-free affair." On Metacritic, it holds a score of 25 out of 100 based on 19 critics, indicating "generally unfavorable reviews".

== International broadcasts ==
| Country | Broadcaster | Timeslot |
|---|---|---|
| Australia | Nine HD | The entire series has been broadcast. |
| Canada | CTV | |
| Finland | MTV3 | Friday 2:15pm |
| Middle East and North Africa | Super Comedy Channel; Dubai One | The entire series has been broadcast from Saturday till Wednesday every week at 4:30pm GMT. |
| Singapore | Channel 5 | Thursdays & Fridays at 1.30am |
| Poland | TVN 7 | Saturday mornings |
| New Zealand | TV2 | Friday 12:00am |
| Croatia | HRT2 | Late afternoon |
| Romania | PRO Cinema | Afternoon |
