= Stuck in the Suburbs =

2004 American comedy TV film

- Film poster
- Screenplay by: Amy Engelberg; Wendy Engelberg; Daniel Berendsen
- Story by: Amy Engelberg; Wendy Engelberg
- Directed by: Savage Steve Holland
- Starring: Danielle Panabaker; Brenda Song; Ryan Belleville; Kirsten Nelson; Todd Stashwick; Taran Killam
- Music by: David Kitay; Jeff Vincent
- Country of origin: United States
- Original language: English

Production
- Executive producer: Richard Fischoff
- Producer: Rick Arredondo
- Cinematography: Christopher Faloona
- Editor: Cindy Parisotto
- Running time: 82 minutes
- Production company: Richard Fischoff Productions
- Budget: $1 million

Original release
- Network: Disney Channel
- Release: July 16, 2004

Stuck in the Suburbs is a 2004 American comedy film that premiered as a Disney Channel Original Movie. It was released on July 16, 2004, and stars Danielle Panabaker as Brittany Aarons and Brenda Song as Natasha Kwon-Schwartz. Brittany, a regular middle school student in the suburbs, accidentally exchanges cell phones with pop singer Jordan Cahill. This was one of the first television films by Disney to be accompanied by its own soundtrack. The film gathered 3.7 million viewers which made the film the most-watched telecast in its time period in the kids 6–11 and 9–14 demographics. The film's soundtrack entered the U.S. Billboard 200 and peaked at #5 on the Billboard Top Kid Audio charts.

== Plot ==
Brittany Aarons is a regular teenage girl, one of the many who has a crush on popular pop singer Jordan Cahill. However, she is bored of living a suburban existence and pines for excitement. At school, she meets a new girl, Natasha Kwon-Schwartz, who informs Brittany that she moved to suburbia from several years on and off living in Europe and New York. Brittany's other friends dislike Natasha for her nonconformism, but Brittany pursues a friendship with her. Upon finding out that Jordan is filming a video nearby, Brittany invites Natasha to join her and her fangirl friends to watch the shoot. Jordan, at the video shoot, expresses dislike for the shallow new single, wanting to sing his own lyrics, which his record company denies him. When Jordan and his team knock into Brittany and Natasha after the shoot, Eddie (Jordan's assistant, best friend and confidante) and Brittany accidentally pick up one another's phones in the ensuing mess.

Brittany tries to return "Eddie's" phone but is denied entry at Jordan's hotel. Once they get a hold of Eddie and figure out the phone is Jordan's, they demand to speak with the pop star before they would return it, which Eddie refuses. Natasha convinces Brittany that it would be fun to mess with Jordan, and change his image. They prank call his hair stylist, get her to cut off all his hair, and get a new wardrobe for him. Along the way they find that Jordan's life is not the life he chooses, but rather the one his record company wants for him. At first he is terrified that his personal barber gave him a major haircut, but eventually accepts it as the first step towards a break from his manufactured image, enjoying his new wardrobe and look, which he thinks Eddie procured. Eventually, the girls demand Eddie have Jordan perform at a rally hosted by Brittany's mother to save a local landmark, which was previously failing to draw attention.

Jordan gets a hold of Brittany after Eddie confesses to the whole situation, and Jordan explains everything to her. She and Natasha make up from a falling out, and go to meet up with him while being chased by the record company who are tracking his phone. They send his lyrics for one of his songs "More Than Me" to everyone through Brittany's phone, ditch his phone and get a ride to the rally with Brittany's sister. At the rally, Eddie tries to stop Jordan from appearing but ultimately supports him, and the landmark is preserved. Brittany, Natasha, and Brittany's fangirl friends become dancers in the music video he was making at the beginning of the movie, which now features Eddie replacing Jordan. It is shown that Brittany and Jordan keep in touch, and although he invites her to go to New York with him (over the phone), she declines, saying things are really exciting in her suburban town.

== Cast ==
- Taran Killam as Jordan Cahill
  - Robbie Nevil as Jordan Cahill’s singing voice
- Danielle Panabaker as Brittany Aarons, Jordan's crush
- Brenda Song as Natasha Kwon-Schwartz, Brittany's new friend
- Ryan Belleville as Eddie, Jordan's best friend and assistant
- Kirsten Nelson as Susan Aarons, Brittany's mother
- Todd Stashwick as Len, Jordan's boss
- Jennie Garland as Olivia Hooper, Brittany's fangirl friend
- Cici Hedgpeth as Ashley Simon, Brittany's other fangirl friend
- Amanda Shaw as Kaylee Holland, Brittany's other fangirl friend
- Corri English as Jessie Aarons, Brittany's older sister
- Ric Reitz as David Aarons, Brittany's father
- Patrick Stogner as Cooper Aarons, Brittany's younger brother
- Lara Grice as Soccer Mom (Olivia's Mom)
- Drew Seeley as David (Desk Clerk at Hotel)
- Johnny Alonso as Trent (Music Video Director)
- Shannon Floyd as Louise
- Maria Mason as Ms. Dilamma

== Production ==
The film was mostly shot on several locations throughout the Greater New Orleans Area, in particular St. Tammany Parish. The school scenes were filmed in the atrium, front steps, and the courtyard of Ben Franklin High School in the Lakefront area. Lockers were temporarily moved into the atrium to give the appearance of a hallway, and door frames were painted with temporary red paint.

The music video for "Make a Wish" was filmed in Carousel Gardens Amusement Park in New Orleans. The other video for "More Than Me" is filmed at the Piazza d'Italia in Downtown New Orleans.

The "Old House" from the film is actually the Otis House from Fairview-Riverside State Park in Madisonville on the Northshore. The house was aged for production, but restored to its actual appearance at the end of the film. The Otis House was originally built in the 1880s, has been on the National Register of Historic Places since 1998, and it actually is located near the expanding suburb of Mandeville. When Brittany is riding through the suburbs on her bike she is actually riding through Lafreniere Park.

== Reception and ratings ==
The film received 3.7 million viewers at its TV premiere, including top rankings in the time period in the kids 6–11 and 9–14 demographics.

== Soundtrack ==
Stuck in the Suburbs – Original Soundtrack

Soundtrack album by Various artists
- Released: July 13, 2004
- Recorded: 2004
- Genres: Pop, pop rock, dance-pop, teen pop
- Length: 51:17
- Label: Walt Disney
- Producers: Andrew Gold, Dallas Austin, Matthew Gerrard, Matt Serletic, Ralph Churchwell, Sherry Kondor, Mike Nielson, Andy Dodd, Adam Watts, Ginger McCartney, David Margolis

Professional ratings
Review scores
Source	Rating
Allmusic	2.5/5 stars

Walt Disney Records released a soundtrack for the album in July 2004. Taran Killam, who played Jordan Cahill, confirmed that he did not sing in the film. The book Disney High revealed that music producer Robbie Nevil sang Cahill's parts instead.

"Good Life" and "Over It" were featured in several DisneyMania and Walt Disney Records compilation soundtracks. "More Than Me" by Jordan Cahill was featured in The Suite Life of Zack & Cody and Haylie Duff's "A Whatever Life" was in 7th Heaven.

=== Track list ===
1. "A Whatever Life" – Haylie Duff
2. "Good Life" – Jesse McCartney
3. "Stuck" – Stacie Orrico
4. "Over It" – Anneliese van der Pol
5. "Stuck in the Middle With You" – Stealers Wheel
6. "Take Me Back Home" – Greg Raposo
7. "More Than Me" (Acoustic) – Jordan Cahill
8. "On Top of the World" – Jordan Cahill
9. "Make a Wish" – Jordan Cahill
10. "More Than Me" (Pop Version) – Jordan Cahill

=== Charts ===
Chart (2004)	Peak Position
U.S. Billboard 200	182
U.S. Billboard Top Soundtracks	14
U.S. Billboard Top Kid Audio	5
