= Carter MacIntyre =

American actor (born 1979)

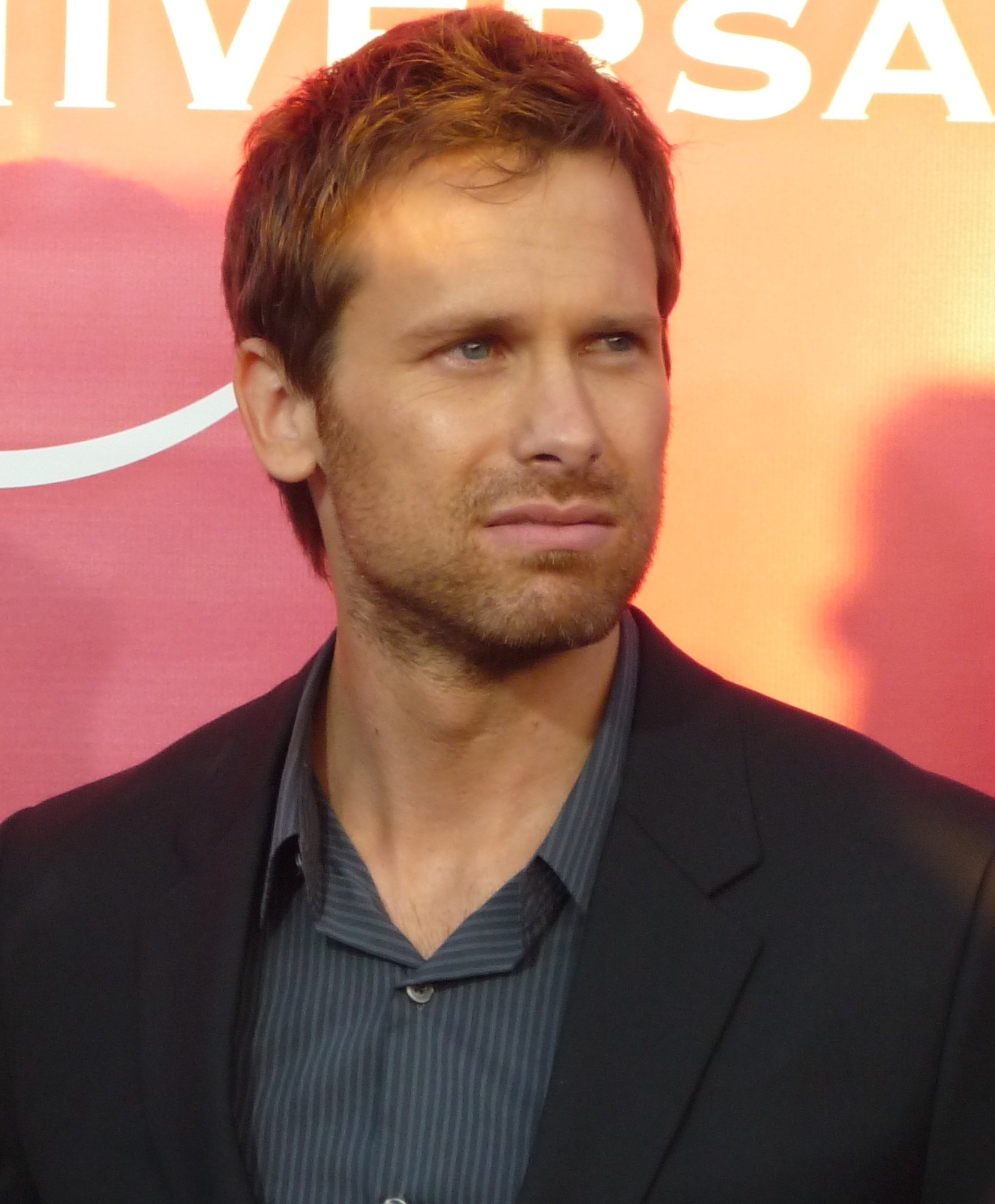
- Carter MacIntyre at Showtime's 2010 Summer TCA.
- Born: Carter Wallace MacIntyre; 1979 (age 45–46); Atlanta, Georgia, U.S.
- Occupation: Actor
- Years active: 2001–present

Carter MacIntyre (born 1979) is an American actor, best known for television roles on the series, Undercovers and American Heiress. His previous acting credits have included guest appearances on Smith and ER. MacIntyre began appearing as CIA operative Leo Nash on the NBC series Undercovers in the Fall 2010 season. MacIntyre was cast as the new guardian angel on Drop Dead Diva for Season 4.

Carter is a native of Atlanta, Georgia, and a graduate of Wake Forest University. He graduated from The Lovett School in 1997, a classmate of Christine Lakin.

== Filmography ==
=== Films ===
| Year | Title | Role | Notes |
|---|---|---|---|
| 2018 | Hunter Killer | Lieutenant Commander Brian Edwards | |
| 2013 | Australian Pilot Season | Actor | Short film |
| 2011 | When You Find Me | Husband | Short film |
| 2010 | The Truth | Young Jonathan | |
| 2009 | The Least Among You | James | |
| 2008 | To Be Continued | Sarah's Boyfriend | Short film |
| 2006 | Wrong Turns | Brad | Short film |

=== Television ===
| Year | Title | Role | Notes |
|---|---|---|---|
| 2024 | Griselda | Al Singleton | 2 episodes |
| 2020 | Bosch | Maxwell | 6 episodes |
| 2019 | The Man in the High Castle | Russ Gilmore | 3 episodes |
| 2018 | American Woman | Harris | Season 1, Episode 7 |
| 2017 | It's Always Sunny in Philadelphia | Mike | Season 12, Episode 7 |
| 2017 | NCIS | Benny Sitano | Season 15, Episode 3 |
| 2014 | Benched | Trent Barber | Main cast |
| 2013 | The Tomorrow People | Vaughn | Season 1, Episode 2 |
| 2013 | CSI: Crime Scene Investigation | Taylor Wynard | Season 13, Episode 15 |
| 2012-2013 | Drop Dead Diva | Luke Daniels | 14 episodes |
| 2012 | Private Practice | Nick Calhoun | 3 episodes |
| 2011 | Wake Up, It's Tuesday! | Garth McGeevey | Season 1, Episode 9 |
| 2011 | CSI: NY | Chris Boyle | Season 7, Episode 13 |
| 2010-2011 | Undercovers | Leo Nash | 11 episodes |
| 2010 | Trauma | Actor | Season 1, Episode 18 |
| 2009 | Nip/Tuck | Warren | Season 6, Episode 7 |
| 2009 | Bones | Officer David Poe | Season 5, Episode 8 |
| 2009 | The Station | Hot Model | Season 1, Episode 16 |
| 2009 | The Mentalist | Bodhi Andros | Season 2, Episode 1 |
| 2008 | It's Always Sunny in Philadelphia | Ace | Season 4, Episode 3 |
| 2007 | American Heiress | JD Bruce | 28 episodes |
| 2006 | ER | Wallace | Season 13, Episode 2 |
| 2006 | Smith | Realtor | Season 1, Episode 2 |
