= Justin Deeley =

American actor and model

- Born: February 1, 1986 (age 40); Louisville, Kentucky, U.S.
- Occupations: Actor; model
- Years active: 2008–present

External image
- Deeley in October 2010

Justin Deeley (born February 1, 1986) is an American actor and model. He is known for his roles on the television series 90210 and Drop Dead Diva.

== Career ==
Deeley played the recurring role of California cowboy Austin Tallridge in the fourth season of The CW's 90210. From 2013 to 2014, he played the regular role of Paul, Jane's guardian angel, on the Lifetime original series Drop Dead Diva.

== Personal life ==
Deeley was born on February 1, 1986, in Louisville, Kentucky. He has a younger brother named Blake.

== Filmography ==
Film
Year	Title	Role	Notes
1999	Roswell: The Aliens Attack	Soldier #2	Television film
2007	Blink	Roman	
2009	Couples Retreat	Trainer	
2010	Devolved	Pete	
2010	Fried Tofu	Zac	Short film
2011	Angela Wright	Robbie	Short film
2011	Hughes the Force	Chaz	Short film
2012	Last Day on Earth	John	
2012	Snow White and the Seven Movies	Battleship soldier	Short film
2013	Thriftstore Cowboy	Brody Locklin	
2013	The Wicked	Zach Reese	
2013	Geography Club	Kevin	
2016	Total Frat Movie	Charlie Martin	
2017	You're Gonna Miss Me	Tally Montana	
2018	The Get Through	Jp	Short film
2020	Dame	Paul Newman	Short film

Television
Year	Title	Role	Notes
2009	Lost Tapes	Tyler	Episode: "Oklahoma Octopus"
2010	Victorious	Guy #1	Episode: "Robarazzi"
2010	Victorious	Beach guy	Episode: "Survival of the Hottest"
2011	90210	Terry	Episode: "To the Future!"
2011–2012	90210	Austin Tallridge	17 episodes
2013–2014	Drop Dead Diva	Paul	Main role (seasons 5–6); 26 episodes
2015	Significant Mother	Timmy	Episode: "Under Buddy"
2016	Loosely Exactly Nicole	Kyle	Episode: "Stripper"
2017	Fear the Walking Dead	Mike Trimbol	3 episodes
2017	A Man for Every Month	Jack	Television film

Web
Year	Title	Role	Notes
2012	Never Fade Away	Bryce Sutton	Main role; 4 episodes
2012	BlackBoxTV	Rick	Episode: "The Last Encounter"
