= Bride scam =

Scam technique

A bride scam is a form of romance scam, a confidence trick that aims to defraud potential grooms with the offer of a foreign bride. The basis of the confidence trick is to seek men from the western world who would like to marry a foreign woman and pretend to be willing to marry them. The woman (scammer) asks the man to send money, for example, for the purposes of purchasing an airline ticket or a visa they have no intention of buying. The relationship ends after requested money has been wired and received, sometimes after multiple transfers have been made.

This phenomenon increased in number with the rise of the internet with its online dating sites and online chats.

== Law enforcement ==
The U.S. State Department often refers to bride scams as "Boris and Natasha" scams, when a lonely American man believes he has found a beautiful woman to marry except Natasha ends up being a Boris. Bride scams are a part of the rapidly growing criminal activity known as Cybercrime, which in 2007 and 2008, cost approximately US$8 billion worldwide. Currently, laws are unable to properly deal with the various forms of cybercrime that are facing contemporary law enforcement agencies. The Federal Bureau of Investigation, as well as Interpol are currently working to establish working relationships with other global organizations to help combat this recent trend.

Most of the current legislation in the United States surrounding international marriage brokers (IMBs) or Mail-order brides began in 1990 and was superseded multiple times, most recently in the 2005 International Marriage Broker Regulation Act (IMBRA). This legislation was focused on protecting the women involved who are made vulnerable due to the multitude of circumstances surrounding their move to the United States. Furthermore, some parts of the current legislation in the U.S. may hurt the ability of men to protect themselves against fraud. IMBRA stipulates that, "IMBs may not disclose a recruit's personal information to a U.S. client until the recruit has reviewed any records retrieved and has returned a signed document in her primary language (no exceptions) consenting to the release of her information."

The premise of this law may be to protect the women from domestic violence and exploitation and it probably does, the law does not provide inquiring men with enough protection. Currently, the only laws available to protect the rights of the men being targeted by bride scams are those concerning Cybercrime. The IMBRA did require the Attorney General to conduct a study on international marriage brokers, which sheds light on the women who use fraud to manipulate men with the promise of marriage before disappearing upon entry to the United States.

There are laws concerning computer fraud and they can be "separated into two categories: 1) crimes facilitated by a computer and 2) crimes where a computer or network is the target." Bride scam refers to the first category, "crimes facilitated by a computer," and is punishable according to U.S. law. U.S code number 18 U.S.C. § 1030. refers to Fraud and Related Activity in Connection with Computers, and explicitly states, "Whoever with intent to extort from any person any money or other thing of value..." is punishable by law.

== Nations and organizations of interest ==
Russia is where many of the contemporary fraud experts claim the prospective brides come from, and many of the anti-scam sites look to combat this particular form of bride scam. Additionally, many IMBs offer opportunities to marry women from impoverished regions all over the world including Russians, Asians, and Ibero-Americans.

With the lack of governmental involvement concerning bride scams, many unaffiliated websites have started to provide people with the "How to" when it comes to avoiding being scammed. Most of these sites include a list of "known russian scammers by name (photo, email etc)" as well as any photos which are known to have been used by scammers in the past. Some people have even turned to private investigators to help them determine whether or not the woman they are courting actually exist.

== See also ==
- Transnational marriage
- Mail-order bride (International marriage agency)
- Computer crime
- International criminal law
