= Josh Berman =

American screenwriter

- Born: Joshua Berman
- Occupation(s): Writer, producer

Joshua Berman is an American writer and producer for television. He was an executive producer on the TV show CSI: Crime Scene Investigation and consulting producer on Bones.

== Career ==
Josh Berman was born in 1972. Berman's writing career began in comedy in 1998 when he won an NBC writing contest.

Drop Dead Diva, created by Berman originally for Fox, premiered on Lifetime on July 12, 2009. Produced by Sony Pictures Television, the series stars stage actress Brooke Elliott as Jane, a brilliant, thoughtful, and overweight attorney whose body is inhabited by the soul of a vapid fashion model, and Margaret Cho as her loyal assistant, Teri. Berman's grandmother, who he described as having “carried herself as a supermodel,” inspired the character Jane, as Berman sought to bring his grandmother's self-acceptance and life-affirming energy to the screen. His Osprey Productions company most recently signed a deal with Sony Pictures Television.

Berman has written and directed Drop Dead Dave, an hour-long series that is still in development as of October 2021. It explores a similar concept to his popular series Drop Dead Diva; the new series follows the character Dave as he finds new perspective when reincarnated as a complicated Gen X lawyer.

== Personal life ==
Berman is a native of Encino and is gay. His brother, David Berman, is head researcher for CSI, and occasionally plays assistant coroner "Super Dave" Phillips.
