= Lex Medlin =

American actor (born 1969)

- Born: March 30, 1969 (age 57); Arizona, U.S.
- Other name: Michael Medlin
- Occupation: Actor
- Years active: 1993–present
- Spouse: Lori Bell (m. 2004)
- Children: 3

External image
- Lex Medlin in July 2006

Lex Medlin (born March 30, 1969) is an American actor. He has appeared in a wide variety of television commercials and sitcoms. He starred in the 2006 Fox TV sitcom Happy Hour. He recently starred as a judge and love interest of the main character on the Lifetime series Drop Dead Diva.

== Early life, education and family ==
Medlin was born in Arizona.

He attended the American Academy of Dramatic Arts, Pasadena, California (1990–1991).

== Career ==
Medlin began his career appearing in local and Spanish-market ads for which he achieved some acclaim. He has appeared in numerous television commercials, for companies like Dockers, Gardetto's, Gateway Computers, Geico Direct, Kia Spectra, Selsun Blue, Time Warner Cable, State Farm, T-Mobile, Solarcity, and Twix.

After numerous television guest appearances and small film roles, also appearing as a guest star in season 6 of Friends, he landed a recurring role in the UPN sitcom Rock Me Baby (2003–04), appearing in 10 episodes of that program's single-season run. He was a main cast member of the short-lived Fox sitcom Happy Hour in 2006. In 2011, he began a recurring role as Judge Owen French on the Lifetime legal drama/fantasy series Drop Dead Diva, and became a main cast member for that show's fourth season (2012).

He and his wife Lori appeared together on an episode of the Food Network show Party Starters in 2003. In the episode, their ranch house in the San Fernando Valley was transformed in tropical style for a housewarming.

== Personal life ==
Medlin and his wife Lori have two children together. He has a third grown child from a previous relationship.

== Filmography ==
=== Movie ===
- The Little Rascals Save the Day (2014)
- The Notorious #9 (2010)
- The Hot Sand (2005)
- Film Club (2000)
- Going All the Way (1997) (scenes deleted)

=== Television ===
- Mayans M.C. (2022) (Season 4, Episodes 3 & 4)
- Raven's Home (2022)
- CSI: Vegas (2021)
- Grey's Anatomy (2021)
- B Positive (2020)
- All Rise (2020)
- Shameless (2018)
- 9-1-1 (2018)
- Jane the Virgin (2016)
- Criminal Minds (2015)
- Modern Family (2013)
- The Mentalist (2013)
- Drop Dead Diva (2011–2014)
- Hot in Cleveland (2011)
- CSI: Crime Scene Investigation (2010)
- Supernatural (2010)
- Southland (2009–2010)
- It's Always Sunny in Philadelphia (2009)
- Men of a Certain Age (2009)
- Monk (2009)
- Mental (2009)
- The Closer (2009)
- The Middle (2007)(Lost/Unaired Pilot Episode)
- Happy Hour (2006)
- Married to the Kellys (2004)
- Rock Me Baby (2003–2004)
- Still Standing (2002–2004)
- Bad Haircut (2001)
- Jack & Jill (2001)
- Titus (2001)
- Charmed (1999) (Season 2 Episode 5: She's a Man, Baby She's a Man - Smith)
- Friends (1999) (Season 6, Episode 10)
- One World (1998)
- Team Knight Rider (1998)
- Silk Stalkings (1996)
- Beverly Hills, 90210 (1993)
