= Vickie Eng =

American actress

- Occupation: Actress
- Years active: 1990-present

Vickie Eng (or Vicki Eng) is an American actress, licensed chiropractor and practitioner/proponent of self healing techniques, such as Taoist qigong. She is best known for playing the role of "W" on the show Good Eats (and later became the chiropractor of the show's host Alton Brown), and for playing Judge Rita Mayson in Drop Dead Diva. She lives in Atlanta, Georgia.

She has released two instructional self-healing videos: Oriental Secrets: Heavenly Circulation of Chi and Oriental Secrets: Chi Gong for Better Health.

== Filmography ==
- Venom (2018) as Riot (credited as "Elderly Village Woman / Riot Host")
- A Madea Christmas (2013) as Customer #6
- We're the Millers (2013) as Nurse
- The Change-Up (2011) as Erin Walsh
- Taking Chances (2009) as Kitty Truslow
- The Gospel (2005) as Doctor
- Diary of a Mad Black Woman (2005) as Christina
- The Staremaster (2003) as Rene
- Broken (2003) as Mrs. Cheng
- The Conspiracy (2003) as Bank Manager
- Chung King Express (1994) as Bar Maid

== TV series ==
- Greenleaf (2016) as Maricel
- Homeland (2011) as CIA Agent
- The Vampire Diaries (2011) as Nurse
- The Chin Chens (2011) as Hoa Chin Chen
- Homeland (2011) as Elizabeth Chu
- Detroit 1-8-7 (2010) as Lady Neighbor
- Drop Dead Diva (2009-2011) as Judge Rita Mayson
- Meet the Browns (2009) as Family Member
- Active Parenting of Teens: 3rd Edition (2008) as Mrs. Kwan
- K-Ville (2007) as Nail Shop Worker (Fong Trang)
- Army Wives (2007) as Dr. Lasgrove
- Thief (2006) as Dr. W
- Good Eats (1999-2009, 2019) as "W"/Ms. Wong/Vicki Wong/"Wilhelmina"
- Savannah (1996) as Sales Clerk
- In the Heat of the Night (1990) as Call Girl
