= April Bowlby =

American actress and model (born 1980)

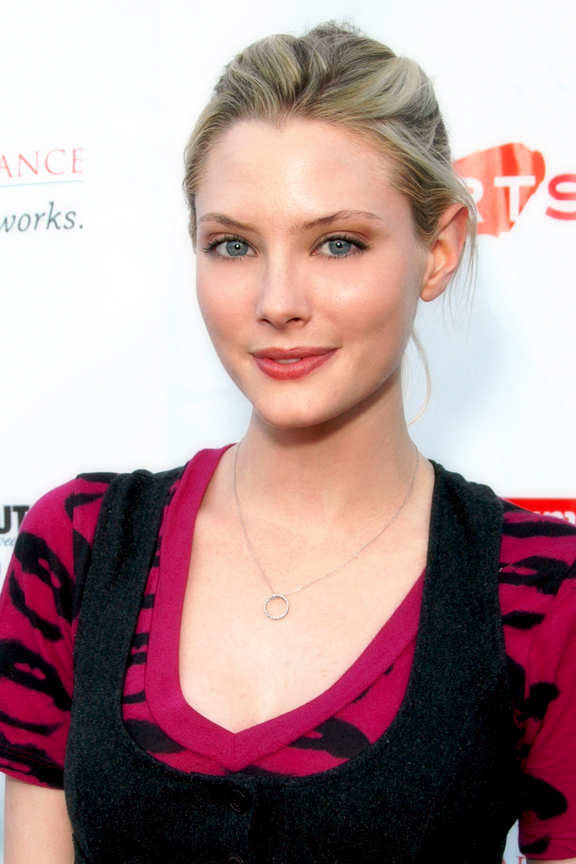
- Bowlby in 2008
- Born: July 30, 1980 (age 46); Vallejo, California, U.S.
- Occupations: Actress; model
- Years active: 2004–present
- Spouse: Matthew Cooke (2020)
- Children: 1

April Bowlby (born July 30, 1980) is an American actress and model. She is known for portraying Kandi on the CBS comedy series Two and a Half Men (2003–2015), Stacy Barrett on the Lifetime series Drop Dead Diva (2009–2014), and Rita Farr on the Max series Titans (2018) and Doom Patrol (2019–2023).

== Early life ==
Her family moved from Vallejo, California, to Manteca, California, when she was a child. She attended and graduated from East Union High School. Bowlby began a modeling career before deciding to pursue acting.

== Career ==
Bowlby secured the role of Kandi on the television series Two and a Half Men within months of her first auditions. She is also known for her role as Stacy Barrett in Drop Dead Diva. She played Barney Stinson's obsessive ex-girlfriend Meg in How I Met Your Mother, and has made appearances in CSI, Psych, and CSI: NY. She has appeared in films such as All Roads Lead Home (2008), The Slammin' Salmon (2009), and From Prada to Nada (2011).

She starred as Rita Farr on the show Doom Patrol.

== Filmography ==
=== Film ===
Year	Title	Role	Notes
2008	All Roads Lead Home	Natasha	
2009	The Slammin' Salmon	Mia	
2011	From Prada to Nada	Olivia	
2018	Unbroken: Path to Redemption	Cecy Phillips	
2021	Father Christmas Is Back	Jackie	

=== Television ===
Year	Title	Role	Notes
2004	CSI: Crime Scene Investigation	Kaitlin Rackish	Episode: "What's Eating Gilbert Grissom?"
2005	CSI: NY	Jenny Lee	Episode: "Crime and Misdemeanor"
2005	Stacked	Jasmine	Episode: "The Ex-Appeal"
2005	Freddie	Sydney	Episode: "Rich Man, Poor Girl"
2005–2007, 2012, 2015	Two and a Half Men	Kandi / Kimber	Recurring role (season 3); main role (season 4); guest star (seasons 10, 12)
2007	Sands of Oblivion	Heather	Television film
2007–2009, 2014	How I Met Your Mother	Meg	4 episodes
2008	Out of Jimmy's Head	Princess Gugulfa	Episode: "Princess"
2009	Kath & Kim	Ashley	Episode: "Bachelorette"
2009–2014	Drop Dead Diva	Stacy Barrett	Main role
2010	CSI: Crime Scene Investigation	Marta Petrovich	Episode: "Unshockable"
2010	Psych	Lauren Lassiter	Episode: "Dead Bear Walking"
2015	Mom	Selene	Episode: "Cheeseburger Salad and Jazz"
2015	You're the Worst	Bernadette	Episode: "Born Dead"
2016	Marriage of Lies	Rachel Wilson	Television film; originally titled Presumed Guilty
2016	The Engagement Clause	Katie Tate	Television film; originally titled Married by Christmas
2017	The Big Bang Theory	Rebecca	Episode: "The Separation Agitation"
2017	Love's Last Resort	Alyssa	Television film
2017	A Mother's Crime	Nikki	Television film
2018	Heathers	Teyna	2 episodes
2018	Titans	Rita Farr	Episode: "Doom Patrol"
2018	The Wrong Daughter	Ms. Hanson	Television film
2018	Dying for the Crown	Isabelle Wagner	Television film; also known as Homecoming Revenge
2019–2023	Doom Patrol	Rita Farr / Elasti-Woman	Main role
