= Brooke Elliott =

American actress and singer

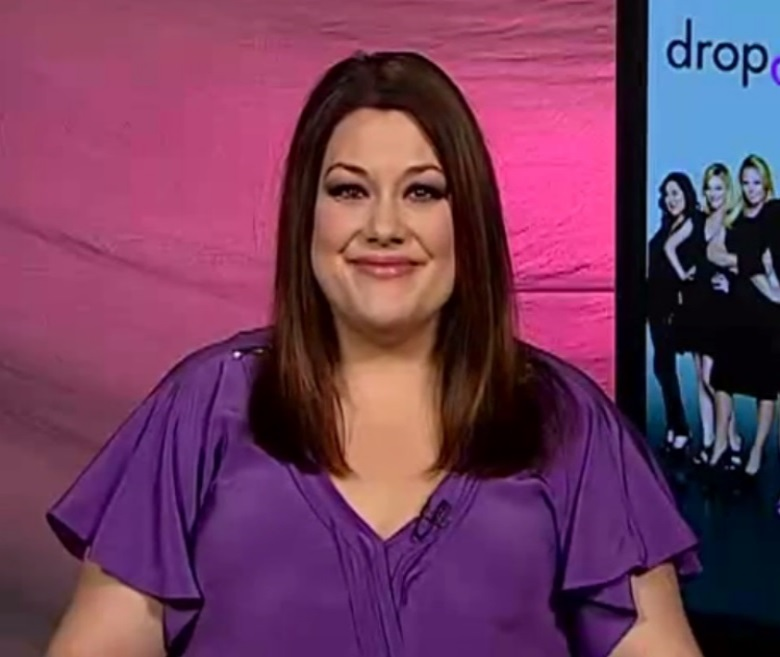
- Elliott in 2013
- Born: November 16, 1974 (age 51); Fridley, Minnesota, U.S.
- Education: Western Michigan University (BFA)
- Occupation: Actress
- Years active: 2000–present
- Known for: Drop Dead Diva; Sweet Magnolias

Brooke Elliott (born November 16, 1974) is an American actress and singer. She has appeared in musical theatre, including the US tours of Beauty and the Beast and Wicked, and the Broadway productions of Taboo and The Pirate Queen. She is known for her roles as Jane Bingum on the Lifetime series Drop Dead Diva (2009–2014) and as Dana Sue Sullivan in the Netflix romantic drama Sweet Magnolias (2020–present).

== Early life ==
Elliott was born in Fridley, Minnesota, to Robert, a city manager, and Kathleen Elliott, on November 16, 1974. Elliott has one sister, Jamie Alexander, and one brother, Adam Elliott. Her parents have said that she began to sing when she was three years old, and footage exists of her at that age singing You Light Up My Life. Her family moved on several occasions, first to Blaine, Minnesota, and then out of state to Missouri, Oklahoma, and Illinois. The family settled in Riverview, Michigan, when Elliott was a junior in high school. She graduated from Gabriel Richard Catholic High School in 1993; she appeared in high school productions while there, including in Richard III and Joseph and the Amazing Technicolor Dreamcoat. Elliott went on to Western Michigan University, and graduated with a Bachelor of Fine Arts in Musical Theatre Performance in 1998.

Elliott worked as a temp and a waitress, including working at a 1950s-themed restaurant where she had to dance on the tables every hour.

== Career ==
For ten weeks in 1999, she was a member of Chicago-based stage combat theatre company Babes With Blades. As part of that role, she performed a scene from Robin Hood: Prince of Thieves, The Miracle Worker and Heathers. She left for her first professional theatre role as the Sugar Bowl in the US touring version of Beauty and the Beast. She also appeared as part of the cast in the North American tour of Wicked alongside Adam Lambert, whom she later supported when he appeared on American Idol.

She credits Rosie O'Donnell with getting her first Broadway role alongside Boy George in Taboo. Rosie later described her as "fresh off a Disney Cruise", but allowed her to come back for a second attempt. Elliott spent $117 to change her outfit and make-up in order to be better suited to the role; O'Donnell reimbursed Elliott when she was awarded a part in the show. The show closed after only a hundred performances, but O'Donnell subsequently praised Elliott's passion for the show. Elliott went on to play Majella in The Pirate Queen, which opened in Chicago in 2006 and moved to Broadway in 2007.

Her first film role was in the Mel Gibson film What Women Want in 2000. Her first television role was in an episode of Law & Order: Trial by Jury. In 2009, Elliott was cast as main character Jane Bingum on Lifetime's Drop Dead Diva. Producer Craig Zadan said of Elliott's casting, "We had to find somebody who's a beautiful leading lady, who can do the comedy and drama, and with Brooke, she nailed it". After the pilot, The New York Times described Elliott as "convincing, and even affecting, at every turn", and the Los Angeles Times said she was "a stage actress with fabulous comic timing and enormous dramatic flexibility". Elliott also sings on the soundtrack to the series. The show ended after its sixth season in 2014.

In 2016, Elliott starred opposite Katey Sagal in the CBS comedy pilot Upper Middle Bogan inspired by the Australian series. It was not ordered to series. In 2018, she went to star in the ABC comedy pilot created by Bobby Bowman about a dysfunctional family struggling with mental illness.

In 2019, Elliot was cast in a leading role on the Netflix romantic drama series Sweet Magnolias. In 2022, she executive produced and starred as a country music superstar in the Lifetime holiday movie A Country Christmas Harmony.

== Personal life ==
During her time as the leading character in Drop Dead Diva, Elliott has discussed the perception of plus-size actresses on television, and describes her body type as normal sized, stating: "The majority of women in America look like me. It's one of the things I love about the show."

== Filmography ==
=== Film ===
Year	Title	Role	Notes	Ref.
2000	What Women Want	Woman in park		
2017	Trew Calling	Kendra		
2019	More Beautiful for Having Been Broken	Kat		

=== Television ===
Year	Title	Role	Notes	Ref.
2005	Law & Order: Trial by Jury	Denise Bell	Episode: "Vigilante"	
2009–2014	Drop Dead Diva	Jane Bingum	Main role	
2016	Furst Born	Amber	Pilot	
2018	Crazy Wonderful	Keri-Ann	Pilot	
2019	Dolly Parton's Heartstrings	Nancy	Episode: "If I Had Wings"	
2020–2026	Sweet Magnolias	Dana Sue Sullivan	Main role	
2022	A Country Christmas Harmony	Chrissy Kessler	Television film; also executive producer	

=== Theatre ===
Year	Title	Role	Notes	Ref.
2003	Taboo	Big Sue	Leigh's main assistant and confidante. Character based on Sue Tilley.	
2005, 2007	Wicked	Madame Morrible (understudy) and ensemble	Broadway musical, US tour & Los Angeles	
2007	The Pirate Queen	Majella	Broadway musical	

=== Discography ===
==== Cast recordings ====
- The Pirate Queen – Original Broadway Cast (2007) – as Majella

==== Compilation albums ====
- Drop Dead Diva – Music from the Original Television Series (2010)

== Awards and nominations ==
Year	Awarding Body	Category	Nominated work	Result	Ref.
2009	Satellite Award for Best Actress	Television Series Musical or Comedy	Drop Dead Diva	Nominated	
2010	Gracie Award	Female Rising Star in a Comedy Series	Drop Dead Diva	Won	
2011	Prism Award	Best Actress in a Comedy Series	Drop Dead Diva	Nominated	
2011	Women's Image Network Awards	Best Actress Comedy Series	Drop Dead Diva	Won	
2014	Prism Award	Best Actress in a Comedy Series	Drop Dead Diva	Nominated	
