= Amy and Wendy Engelberg =

American television producers and writers

Amy and Wendy Engelberg are an American television writing and producing team who are sisters. They wrote and produced for Maybe This Time, Clueless, Lizzie McGuire, What I Like About You, Sonny with a Chance and Drop Dead Diva. As well as writing the television films Stuck in the Suburbs and Made... The Movie.

== Credits ==
- Maybe This Time (writers, 1995–1996)
- Clueless (writers, 12 episodes, 1996–1998)
- Honey, I Shrunk the Kids: The TV Show (writers, 1 episode, 1999)
- Katie Joplin (writers, 1 episode, 1999)
- M.Y.O.B. (producers, 1 episode, 2000)
- Grosse Pointe (writers, producers, 1 episode, 2000)
- All About Us (writers, 1 episode, 2001)
- Way Downtown (executive producers, TV film, 2002)
- Regular Joe (producers, 1 episode, 2003)
- 8 Simple Rules (writers, producers, 1 episode, 2003)
- Lizzie McGuire (writers, 2 episodes, 2001 & 2004)
- Darcy's Wild Life (writers, 1 episode: "Queen of the Rodeo", 2004)
- Stuck in the Suburbs (writers, TV film, 2004)
- What I Like About You (writers, consulting/executive/supervising producers, 2003–2006)
- About a Girl (writers, 2 episodes, 2008)
- Sonny with a Chance (writers, consulting producers, 2009–2010)
- Drop Dead Diva (writers, 12 episodes, 2009–2014)
- Made... The Movie (writers, TV film, 2010)
- Fuller House (writers, 5 episodes, 2015–2019)
- Daytime Divas (creators, executive producers, 10 episodes, 2016)
