= Jackson Hurst =

American actor

- Born: Jackson Ryan Hurst; February 17, 1979 (age 47); Houston, Texas, U.S.
- Education: Baylor University
- Occupation: Actor
- Years active: 2006–present
- Spouse: Stacy Stas (m. 2014)
- Children: 3

External image
- Jackson Hurst in 2011

Jackson Ryan Hurst (born February 17, 1979) is an American actor. He is best known for portraying Grayson Kent on the Lifetime comedy series Drop Dead Diva (2009–2014).

== Early life and education ==
Hurst was born and raised in the Houston area of Texas as the middle of three sons, his brothers are Colin and Michael. He attended St. Pius X High School (and during high school he played football, soccer, basketball, and baseball) and Baylor University, where he majored in international economics and management information systems with a minor in Spanish. After college, Hurst spent a year in Mexico City working for a transport company before beginning a finance career in Houston.

== Career ==
Hurst kept his day job in the finance industry, juggling it with acting gigs, until he was offered a role in The Mist in 2007. He appeared in episodes of the television series Inspector Mom in 2006, The Closer in 2009 and NCIS in 2010. Since 2009, Hurst has played Grayson Kent on the Lifetime original comedy series Drop Dead Diva. He also appeared in the films Have Dreams, Will Travel (2007), The Mist (2007) and Shorts (2009). In 2011, Hurst starred in his first leading role in the film A Bird of the Air.

== Personal life ==
Hurst became engaged to actress Stacy Stas in October 2013. They were married in San Juan Capistrano, California, on June 7, 2014. They have three children together: two sons born in 2015 and 2018, and a daughter born in 2020.

== Filmography ==
=== Film ===
Year	Title	Role	Notes
2006	Soul's Midnight	Max	
2006	Wednesday	Luke	Video
2006	Striking Range	Stan	
2007	Walking Tall: The Payback	Hank	Uncredited
2007	Cleaner	Paramedic	
2007	Walking Tall: Lone Justice	Hank	Video
2007	Have Dreams, Will Travel	Jack	
2007	The Mist	Joe Eagleton	
2009	Shorts	Male Employee	
2011	The Tree of Life	Uncle Ray	Uncredited
2011	A Bird of the Air	Lyman	
2012	Hidden Moon	Bruce	
2016	Vanished – Left Behind: Next Generation	Eric Harlow	
2016	Day of Reckoning	David	
2016	Hot Air	Bradley	
2017	Wraith	Dennis Lukens	
2018	Tightrope	Matthew	Short film Also producer
2020	Vampire Dad	Raymond	
2024	One Fast Move	Bobby Tresco	

=== Television ===
Year	Title	Role	Notes
2006	Inspector Mom	Andrew	1 episode
2006	Perfect Disaster	Wade	Documentary Series: 1 episode
2008	Living Proof	Josh	Television film
2009	The Closer	Sergeant Ryan Dunn	Episode: "Dead Man's Hand"
2009–14	Drop Dead Diva	Grayson Kent	Main role; 77 episodes
2010	NCIS	Zach Nelson	Episode: "Dead Air"
2011	Prime Suspect	David Hollister	Episode: "Bitch"
2012	Unforgettable	Steve Cioffi Jr.	3 episodes
2012	Scandal	Senator Jacob Shaw	Episode: "White Hats Off"
2015	Castle	Harlan Mathis	Episode: "Private Eye Caramba!"
2015	Grey's Anatomy	Thomas Archibald	Episode: "Crazy Love"
2016	The Catch	Mario Visconti	Episode: "Pilot"
2016–17	NCIS: Los Angeles	Corbin Duggan	3 episodes
2018	9-1-1	Dan	Episode: "Karma's a Bitch"
2018	Sharp Objects	Kirk Lacey	6 episodes
2019	S.W.A.T.	Sgt. Ben Sikora	Episode: "Sea Legs"
2019	Truth Be Told	Caleb Lythe	2 episodes
2020	Messiah	Jonah Hardwick	3 episodes
2022	Suitcase Killer: The Melanie McGuire Story	Bradley Miller	Television film
2023	True Lies	Harold	Episode: "Public Secrets"
