= List of Loyola Law School alumni =

Loyola Law School of Loyola Marymount University is a Jesuit law school in Los Angeles, California. Following are some of its notable alumni.

== Academia ==
- David W. Burcham, constitutional law scholar and President of Loyola Marymount University
- Ronald K. L. Collins, J.D., professor at Syracuse Law School, George Washington Law School, University of Washington School of Law, and scholar at the Newseum's First Amendment Center in Washington, D.C.
- Ed Howard, J.D. 1990, senior counsel for the Children's Advocacy Institute and Center for Public Interest Law at the University of San Diego School of Law
- Annette Nellen, J.D. 1987, professor, director of the graduate tax program at the San José State University

== Business ==
- John Edward Anderson, businessman, philanthropist, and namesake UCLA Anderson School of Management
- Karl Auerbach, J.D. 1978, chief technology officer at InterWorking Labs and founder of Epilogue Technology Corporation
- James L. Barrett, owner of Chateau Montelena
- Reza Jahangiri, J.D. 2004, CEO of American Advisors Group and past co-chair of the National Reverse Mortgage Lenders Association
- Gordon Naccarato, chef and restaurateur
- Wilfred Von der Ahe, co-founder of Vons supermarket chain
- Jason Wilk, founder and CEO of Dave
- Henry C. Yuen, co-founder, and former CEO and chairman, of Gemstar-TV Guide International

== Entertainment ==
- Jasmine Abedi, J.D., television producer, and entertainment attorney
- Gloria Allred, J.D. 1974, lawyer, radio talk show host and media personality
- Tammara Billik, noted casting director
- Michael Blodgett, non-degreed, actor, novelist, and screenwriter
- Joe Escalante, punk-rock musician and record label entrepreneur
- Norman Goldman, political talk radio host
- Barry Gordon, J.D. 1991, actor and political talk show host
- Craig Kirkwood, actor, known for his role as "Rev" in Remember the Titans
- Chris Kobin, screenwriter and producer
- Josie Loren, 2019, actress known for the role of Kaylie Cruz in the ABC Family series Make It or Break It
- Eric Menyuk, 1998, actor
- Adam Nimoy, television director
- Clark A. Peterson, founder of Necromancer Games
- Ian Sander, television producer
- John Schubeck, television reporter and anchor
- Harry E. Sloan, J.D. 1976, chairman of Metro-Goldwyn-Mayer (MGM) and SBS Broadcasting
- Alex Winitsky, film producer

== Judiciary ==
- Gail A. Andler, judge of the Orange County Superior Court
- Louis H. Burke, LL.B. 1926, associate justice of the Supreme Court of California
- William P. Clark Jr., J.D. 1957, associate Justice of the California Supreme Court, Deputy Secretary of State, National Security Advisor and Secretary of the Interior
- Lynn D. Compton, 1949, justice of the California Court of Appeal; former chief deputy district attorney, known for the prosecution of Sirhan Sirhan and member of the Band of Brothers
- Michelle Williams Court, judge of the United States District Court for the Central District of California
- Rick Distaso, judge of the Stanislaus County Superior Court and former prosecutor
- J. Cleveland Frugé, justice of the Louisiana Supreme Court and Louisiana House of Representatives
- Mark Gibbons, 1975, justice of the Supreme Court of Nevada
- Otto Kaus, associate justice of the California Supreme Court
- R. Gary Klausner, judge of the United States District Court for the Central District of California
- Marshall F. McComb, associate justice of the Supreme Court of California
- Alex R. Munson, 1975, chief judge of the District Court for the Northern Mariana Islands from 1988 to 2011
- Serena Murillo, judge of the United States District Court for the Central District of California
- Tony Rackauckas, J.D. 1971, judge of the Orange County Superior Court
- Manuel Real, judge of the United States District Court for the Central District of California
- William F. Rylaarsdam, justice of the California Court of Appeal
- Michael T. Sauer, judge of the Los Angeles County Superior Court and former appellate lawyer
- Kathryn Doi Todd, of the California Court of Appeal
- John F. Walter, judge of the United States District Court for the Central District of California

== Law ==
=== Government ===
- Rick Distaso, senior deputy district attorney who served as the lead prosecutor in the case against Scott Peterson
- Gerald Shea, J.D. 1974, district attorney for San Luis Obispo County, California

=== Private practice ===
- Johnnie Cochran, J.D. 1962, high-profile defense lawyer
- Mark Geragos, J.D. 1982, high-profile defense lawyer and co-host of "reasonable doubt" podcast
- Thomas Girardi, J.D. 1964, disbarred attorney and co-founder of the now-defunct Girardi & Keese
- Charles Harder, J.D. 1996, lawyer at the law firm Harder LLP
- Eric Kingsley, J.D. 1996, Partner at the law firm Kingsley Szamet Employment Lawyers
- Irving A. Kanarek, aerospace engineer and defense attorney for Charles Manson
- Melanie Lomax, civil rights lawyer and former head of the Los Angeles Board of Police Commissioners
- Edward L. Masry, plaintiff's lawyer portrayed in the movie Erin Brockovich
- Carmen Milano, lawyer, before being disbarred and becoming a member of the Mafia in the 1980s
- Mary Virginia Orozco, California's first Latina female lawyer
- Robert Shapiro, defense lawyer; name partner of Glaser Weil Fink Jacobs Howard Avchen & Shapiro
- Michael Trope, sports agent and divorce trial lawyer, co-founder of Trope and Decarolis in Los Angeles.
- Laura Wasser, attorney specializing in divorce and well known for her celebrity clients.

== Literature and journalism ==
- Tony Blankley, editor at The Washington Times
- Josh E. Gross, publisher of Beverly Hills Weekly
- Hunter Lovins, co-author of Natural Capitalism

== Military ==
- William J. Fox, United States Marine Corps officer and engineer who oversaw the construction of various military airfields
- John C. "Pappy" Herbst, flying ace and war hero of World War II
- Omar R. Lopez, J.D., sixth civilian director of the Naval Criminal Investigative Service
- Robert William Prescott, ace with the Flying Tigers in World War II

== Non-profit ==
- Phil Ashey, president of the American Anglican Council and bishop of the Diocese of Western Anglicans
- Gary Knell, president and CEO of the National Geographic Society
- Carol Schatz, Juris Doctor, president of the Central City Association of Los Angeles and president of the Downtown Center Business Improvement District
- Edward Tabash, on board of directors for the Center for Inquiry, constitutional expert on church-state issues

== Politics ==
- Salvador Anzelmo, Louisiana House of Representatives from 1960 to 1972
- Richard Bloom, J.D. 1978, California State Assembly from the 50th District and former mayor of Santa Monica
- Ben Cayetano, J.D. 1971, former governor of Hawaii
- William P. Clark Jr., J.D. 1957, United States Secretary of the Interior, U.S. Deputy Secretary of State, National Security Advisor, and associate justice of the California Supreme Court
- John M. Costello, 1924, U.S. representative from California
- Ricardo Cruz, former Chicano Civil Rights Movement lawyer and founder of Catolicos Por La Raza
- Patricia Diaz Dennis, J.D. 1973, Assistant Secretary of State for Human Rights and Humanitarian Affairs and commissioner of the Federal Communications Commission
- Jack R. Fenton, California State Assembly
- Jay Footlik, White House Jewish Liaison
- Ron Galperin, J.D., 19th Los Angeles city controller
- Mike Gatto, J.D. 2004, California State Assembly representing the 43rd Assembly District
- Tom Harman, J.D. 1968, California state senator representing the 35th Senate District
- Rusty Hicks, J.D., former chair of the California Democratic Party
- Charles R. Imbrecht, California State Assembly
- Sung Kim, United States Ambassador to the Philippines, former United States Special Representative for North Korea Policy
- Alejandro Mayorkas, United States Secretary of Homeland Security
- Bob Miller, J.D. 1971, governor of Nevada
- Ross Miller, Secretary of State of Nevada
- Sharon Moriwaki, Hawaii Senate
- Kevin Murray, J.D. 1987, California state senator representing the 26th Senate District
- Blanca Pacheco, J.D., California State Assembly
- Nick Pacheco, former member of the Los Angeles City Council
- Traci Park, Los Angeles City Council
- Diane Patrick, J.D. 1980, First Lady of Massachusetts (2007–2015)
- Eric J. Perrodin, mayor of Compton, California
- Eloise Reyes J.D., California State Assembly
- Libby Schaaf, J.D. 1993, 50th mayor of Oakland, California
- Vincent Thomas, California State Assembly

== Sports ==
- Gene Bleymaier, athletic director at Boise State University and San Jose State University
- Pat Haden, former NFL quarterback and athletic director at the University of Southern California
- Darren Levine, martial artist and entrepreneur
- Bob Myers, J.D. 2003, general manager for the Golden State Warriors in the NBA
- Stacey Nelson, former collegiate All-American softball pitcher
- Derrick Rostagno, former professional tennis player
- Roy Saari, swimmer and water polo player, 1964 Summer Olympics
- Rhoda Walsh, international bridge champion
- Hank Workman, professional baseball player
