= Eddie Howard =

Eddie Howard may refer to:

- Eddy Howard, American vocalist and bandleader
- Eddie Howard (American football), American football punter

== See also ==
- Edward Howard (disambiguation)
