= Edward Howard =

Edward Howard or Ed Howard may refer to:

== Politicians ==
- Edward Howard (died 1620), Member of Parliament for Reigate
- Edward Howard, 1st Baron Howard of Escrick (died 1675), British nobleman and parliamentarian
- Edward L. Howard (1926–2011), Pennsylvania politician
- Edward Stafford Howard (1851–1916), British Liberal politician and magistrate
- Edward Howard, 1st Baron Lanerton (1809–1880), British naval commander and politician
- Edward Howard, 2nd Earl of Carlisle (1646–1692), English Whig politician
- Edward Howard, 8th Earl of Effingham (born 1971), Conservative member of the House of Lords

== Religion ==
- Edward Henry Howard (1829–1892), English Roman Catholic cardinal
- Edward Howard (bishop) (1877–1983), American prelate of the Roman Catholic Church

== Writers ==
- Edward Howard (novelist) (1793–1841), English novelist
- Edward Howard (playwright) (1624–1712), playwright and poet, brother of Sir Robert Howard

== Others ==
- Edward Howard (admiral) (1476/7–1513), early naval commander and Lord High Admiral of England, close friend of Henry VIII
- Edward Charles Howard (1774–1816), British chemist
- Edward Howard (1813–1904), early time-piece maker in America and the founder of E. Howard & Co.
- Edward Howard (public relations firm), an Ohio-based public relations firm
- Ed Howard (lawyer) (born 1963), American lawyer
- Edward Howard, 8th Earl of Suffolk (1672–1731), English peer
- Edward Howard (actor) (1910–1946), American actor in films such as The Scarlet Horseman
- Edward Lee Howard (1951–2002), CIA case officer who defected to the Soviet Union
- Edward Howard, 9th Duke of Norfolk (1686–1777), British peer
- Sir Edward Howard, 2nd Baronet (1915–2001), English businessman and lord mayor of London
- Edward Howard (surgeon) and 2001 winner of the Denis Browne Gold Medal
- Ed Howard (baseball) (born 2002), American baseball player
- Eddy Howard (1914–1963), American vocalist and bandleader
- Eddie Howard (American football) (born 1972), American football punter

== See also ==
- Ted Howard (disambiguation)
