= Warren Easton Charter High School =

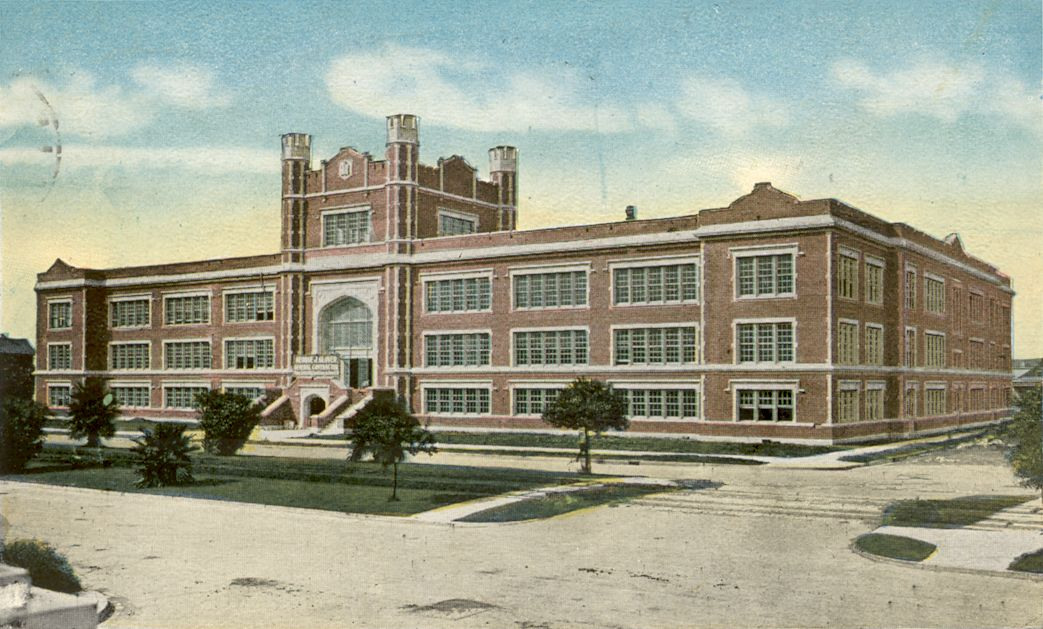

Location
- 3019 Canal St; New Orleans, Louisiana 70119; United States; 29.968537°N 90.090506°W

Information
- School type: Public Charter
- Established: 1843, Reestablished 2006
- Principal: Mervin Jackson
- Teaching staff: 73.52 (FTE)
- Grades: 9-12
- Gender: Co-ed
- Enrollment: 1,152 (2023–2024)
- Student to teacher ratio: 15.67
- Campus type: Inner-city
- Colors: Purple and old gold
- Athletics: LHSAA
- Team name: Fighting Eagles
- Website: warreneastoncharterhigh.org

Warren Easton Charter High School is a secondary school in New Orleans, Louisiana. The Warren Easton Charter Foundation governs the school, which is chartered by Orleans Parish School Board.

== History ==
The school was founded in 1843 as Boys High School. It was the first high school in the State of Louisiana and as a public school was formed to educate the working-class population of the city of New Orleans. By 1855 the school had expanded to four locations. After the Civil War in 1867, the four Boys High Schools were merged into Consolidated Boys High School.

In 1911, the Orleans Parish School Board bought a property for a new high school and construction began during that year. The school received its name in 1911, Warren Easton High School. It was named after Warren Easton, the first Supervisor of Education of the State of Louisiana and the City of New Orleans. The principal administrator and the faculty moved into 3019 Canal Street in 1913. The school was originally an all-boys school and in 1952 the school became coeducational. In 1967, Easton was racially integrated and in 1977 the school became a fundamental magnet school.

Prior to 2005, the school was directly under the authority of the Orleans Parish School Board. In 2005, as Hurricane Katrina was about to hit, the New Orleans Regional Transit Authority (RTA) designated Easton as a place where people could receive transportation to the Louisiana Superdome, a shelter of last resort. After Hurricane Katrina hit New Orleans, the school was closed for one year.

In 2006, the school re-opened as a charter school and became Warren Easton Charter High School. In 2007, actress Sandra Bullock adopted the school. Bullock contributed thousands of dollars to the school and also helped to build an on-campus health clinic.

== Curriculum ==
In the 1930s the school hosted German language classes for adults. Chinese and Spanish are offered to students as a foreign language as of 2015.

== Athletics ==
Warren Easton Charter athletics competes in Class 5A in the Louisiana High School Athletic Association.

=== Championships ===
- Football: 1921, 1942, 1987, 1988, 1992, 1996, 2004, 2005
- Track and Field - girls outdoor: 2024

== Notable alumni ==
- Salvador Anzelmo, Louisiana state representative
- Jyaire Brown (Class of 2022), American football player
- Caleb Etienne (Class of 2019), NFL tackle for the Cincinnati Bengals
- Charles Foti (Class of 1953), former Attorney General of Louisiana; former criminal sheriff of Orleans Parish
- Pete Fountain, clarinetist
- Royce Johnson, actor
- Charles Edward Kerbs, artist and playwright
- Anthony Mackie (Class of 1997), actor
- Master P, rapper
- Lee Harvey Oswald, assassin of US President John F. Kennedy
  - Oswald attended Warren Easton in September–October 1955; he was in the 10th grade
- Eddie Price, professional football player and inductee to the College Football Hall of Fame
- Louis Prima, bandleader
- Clay Shaw, businessman implicated by New Orleans District Attorney Jim Garrison in the assassination of Kennedy
- Trombone Shorty (Class of 2004), musician
- Steve Van Buren, professional football player and inductee to the Pro Football Hall of Fame
- Sedrick Van Pran-Granger, current professional football player for the Buffalo Bills
