= Dave (company) =

Digital banking service

Dave Inc.
- Type: Public
- Traded as: Nasdaq: DAVE; Nasdaq: DAVEW; S&P 600 component
- Industry: Financial technology; Financial services
- Headquarters: Los Angeles, California
- Key people: Jason Wilk (CEO)
- Website: dave.com

Dave, also known as Dave.com, is a U.S. financial technology company and digital banking platform. The company is best known for ExtraCash, a short-term credit product designed as an alternative to overdraft fees and payday loans. Founded in 2017 by Jason Wilk, Dave positions itself as an alternative to traditional banks.

== History ==
The name Dave is taken from David, as in David and Goliath. Its mascot is a bear wearing glasses.

Shark Tank star Mark Cuban led a $3 million seed investment round in the company, saying he was crushed by overdraft fees in his twenties. The CEO of Dave, Jason Wilk, was the former creator of AllScreen, a company which was also originally funded by Cuban, who put in a $300,000 investment.

Following the initial investment in Dave by Cuban and other investors, the total funding of the app has increased to $180 million after the $50 million investment by Norwest Venture Capital. The Dave app was the Apple App of the Day in April 2017. It has been downloaded 10 million times. In July 2019, the company was named one of the next billion-dollar startups by Forbes. In October 2019, Dave received a valuation of US$1 billion, and had over four million users.

Dave was ranked number five in Inc. Magazine's list of 5,000 fastest growing companies for 2021. Dave went public on NASDAQ via SPAC on January 6, 2022 through VPC Impact Acquisition Holdings III created by longtime Dave investor Victory Park Capital. The initial valuation was $4 billion. The company was the top performing financial stock of 2024, according to CNBC.

== Services ==
Dave's main service is ExtraCash, a short-term credit product designed as an alternative to overdraft fees and payday loans.

Dave's main service is short-term lending. The company does not charge interest, or late fees, instead charging for a monthly fee and 5% origination fee. Dave launched a banking service in 2019, through a partnership with Evolve Bank & Trust. It has a service for finding side-work called SideHustle.

== Legal issues ==
In December 2024, the United States Department of Justice and the Federal Trade Commission announced a civil enforcement action against Dave Inc. and its board for alleged violations of the FTC Act and ROSCA. The government’s lawsuit alleges deceptive advertising and hidden fees, and seeks unspecified damages.
