= Frontline Wildfire Defense =

American technology company

- Company type: Private
- Industry: Wildfire mitigation technology
- Founded: 2017
- Founder: Harry Statter
- Headquarters: Jackson Hole, Wyoming, United States
- Area served: United States
- Key people: Harry Statter (CEO)
- Products: Frontline Defense System 2
- Services: Automated exterior wildfire defense systems; wildfire monitoring and alerts
- Website: www.frontlinewildfire.com

Frontline Wildfire Defense is an American technology company that develops automated sprinkler and firefighting foam systems to protect properties in wildland–urban interface zones. The company was founded in 2017 and is based in Jackson Hole, Wyoming.

== History ==
Frontline Wildfire Defense was founded by landscape ecologist Harry Statter in 2017. The company was established to help property owners prepare for and respond to wildfire threats.

In 2025, the company announced a $48 million Series A funding round that included investments by Norwest Venture Partners and the Wyoming Business Council. Also in 2025, Frontline Wildfire Defense was named to TIME magazine's annual list of best inventions.

== Products and technology ==
Frontline Wildfire Defense develops water and class A foam sprinkler systems that provide automated exterior wildfire protection for structures. Its technology typically integrates rooftop and perimeter sprinkler hardware with software that monitors wildfire activity using publicly available fire data, weather information, and satellite imagery. The services are primarily utilized by homeowners, property managers, and communities located in wildfire-prone areas.
