= Ted Howard =

Ted, Teddy, or Theodore Howard may refer to:

- Ted Howard (author) (born 1950), American social entrepreneur and author
- Ted Howard (conservationist), New Zealand conservationist and local politician
- Ted Howard (politician) (1868–1939), New Zealand politician
- Ted Howard (soccer) (born 1946), general secretary for CONCACAF, the governing football body in the Caribbean and North and Central America
- T. R. M. Howard (1908–1976), American physician
- Teddy Howard, character in Gothika

== See also ==
- Edward Howard (disambiguation)
