= Stadium High School =

Public school in Tacoma, Washington, US

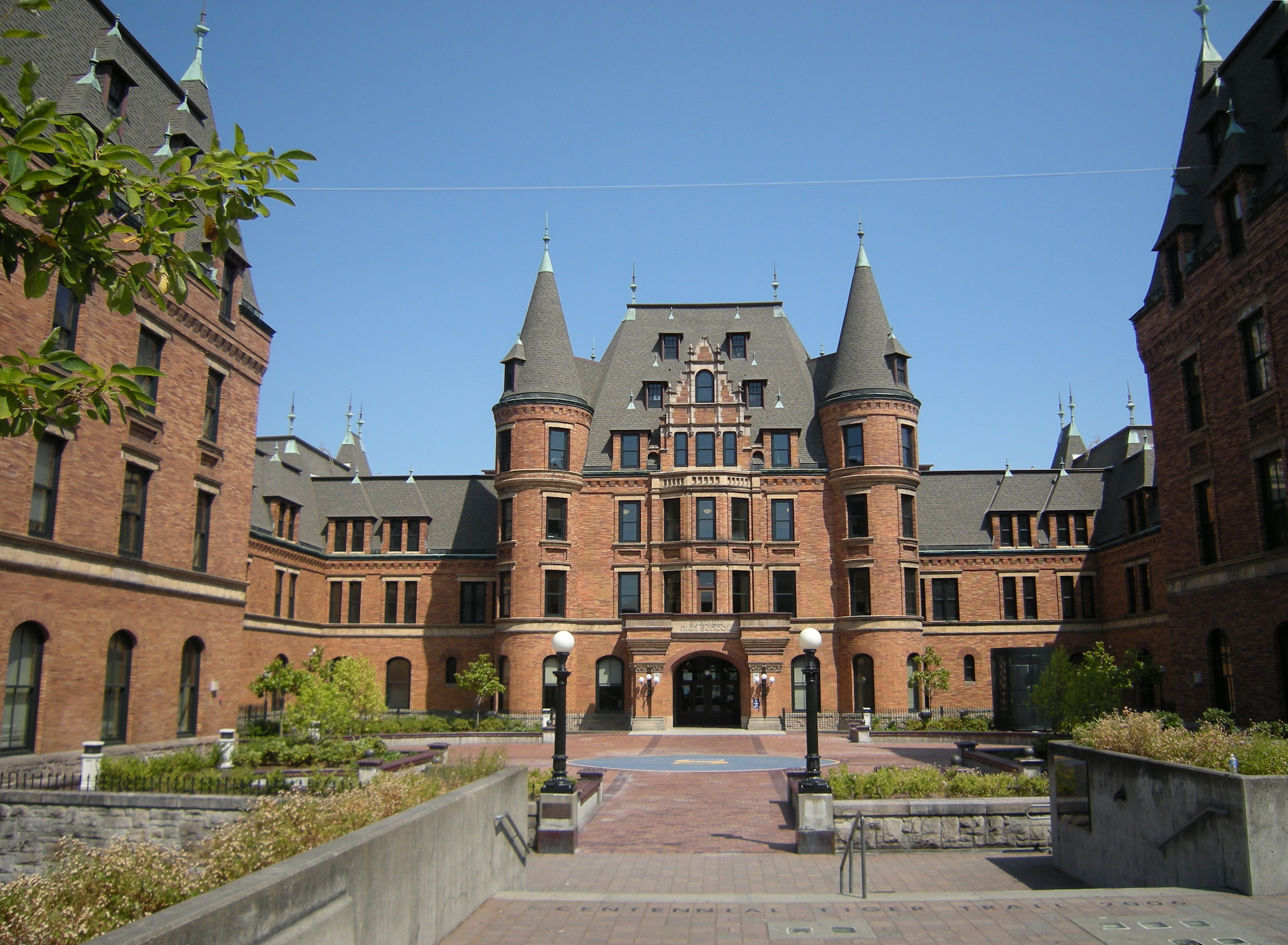
- Main entrance in 2008

Location
- 111 North E Street; Tacoma, Washington; United States; 47.26623°N 122.44816°W

Information
- School type: Public
- Established: September 6, 1906 (120 years ago)
- Status: open
- School district: Tacoma Public Schools
- CEEB code: 481395
- NCES School ID: 530870001502
- Principal: Shannon Marshall
- Teaching staff: 70.80 (FTE)
- Grades: 9–12
- Enrollment: 1,804 (2025–2026)
- Student to teacher ratio: 22.73
- Campus type: Closed
- Colors: Royal blue and gold
- Mascot: Tiger
- Nickname: Tigers
- Newspaper: Stadium World (no longer in publication)
- Yearbook: Tahoma
- Website: stadium.tacomaschools.org

Stadium High School is a public high school located in the Stadium District near downtown Tacoma, Washington. A historic landmark, the original building opened as a school in 1906 after conversion of an uncompleted railway hotel project. The eponymous stadium was added in 1910 in the adjacent gulch.

Within the Tacoma Public Schools (No. 10) district, the school's attendance boundary includes Browns Point and Dash Point.

== History ==
=== Opening ===
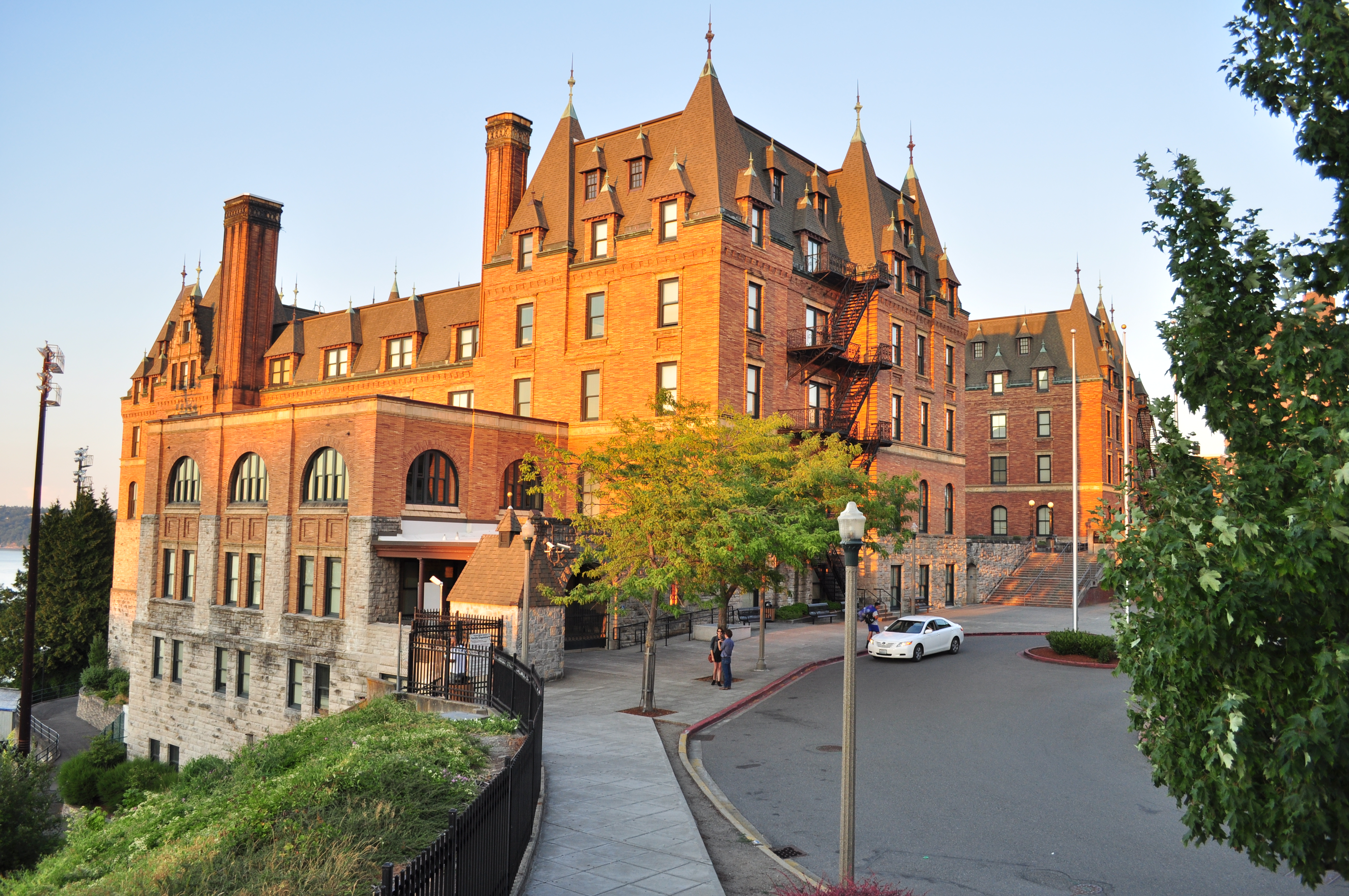
Stadium High School, 2014

The main building was constructed by architects Hewitt and Hewitt for the Northern Pacific Railway and the Tacoma Land Company at what was then known as Blackwell Point. Construction began in 1891 with the intention of building a luxury hotel in Châteauesque style. The Panic of 1893, however, brought construction to an abrupt halt when the Northern Pacific was faced with financial disaster. The unfinished building became a storage facility, with much of the building materials still inside. On October 11, 1898, the building was gutted by a massive fire. The walls remained standing, and the Northern Pacific began to dismantle the structure, removing some 40,000 of the unique Roman bricks manufactured by Gladding, McBean that would be used to construct train stations in Missoula, Montana (still in use) and Wallace, Idaho (now a museum).

The Tacoma School District purchased the gutted building on February 19, 1904, with the intent of turning it into a high school. The redesign and later renovations were planned by the school's architect, Frederick Heath. It was repaired and renovated into a school. Despite its extraordinary locale and design, on the inside it looks, feels, and operates like a typical American high school.

The reconstructed building opened on September 10, 1906, as Tacoma High School. After the 1913 opening of Lincoln High School, the second in the Tacoma School District, Tacoma High School's name was changed to reference the adjacent stadium.

=== Stadium ===
The stadium, also designed by Frederick Heath, dates from 1910 and is in a location once known as Old Woman's Gulch. It was originally much grander than it is today, with a seating capacity of 32,000. Among those who spoke there were Theodore Roosevelt, Woodrow Wilson, Warren G. Harding, William Jennings Bryan, and Billy Sunday.

The stadium was originally built in 1909–1910 using steam shovels and sluicing to move more than 180,000 cubic yards (140,000 m^{3}) down the edges of the gulch to create a flat playing field of 2.5 acres (10,000 m^{2}). Wooden molds were built to cast concrete for 31 rows of stadium seating surrounding the playfield. The original structure exceeded what the soil could support. A restoration project in the 1970s had to sacrifice roughly half of the seating capacity because of instability. In 1981 a burst storm drain washed away the scoreboard and the bayward end zone of the football field. This was followed by a further restoration allowing the stadium to reopen in 1985.

=== Later history ===
Later additions included a circular lunchroom, an underground swimming pool, a science and industrial arts complex, a gymnasium, and a multi-story parking lot structure with tennis courts on the roof.

The school was the filming location for many of the scenes of the 1999 movie, 10 Things I Hate About You.

In 2005–2006 the school underwent a major renovation, seismic upgrade, historical restoration, and expansion. Bassetti Architects were the design architects, and Merrit Pardini Architects (later Krei Architecture) were the architects of record for this work. During the renovation, students were temporarily relocated to the old site of Mount Tahoma High School in the south end, just over 7 miles (11 km) away.

The centennial celebration of Stadium High School was held on September 16, 2006. The celebration was attended by 3,299 alumni, setting a Guinness World Record for the largest recorded school reunion.

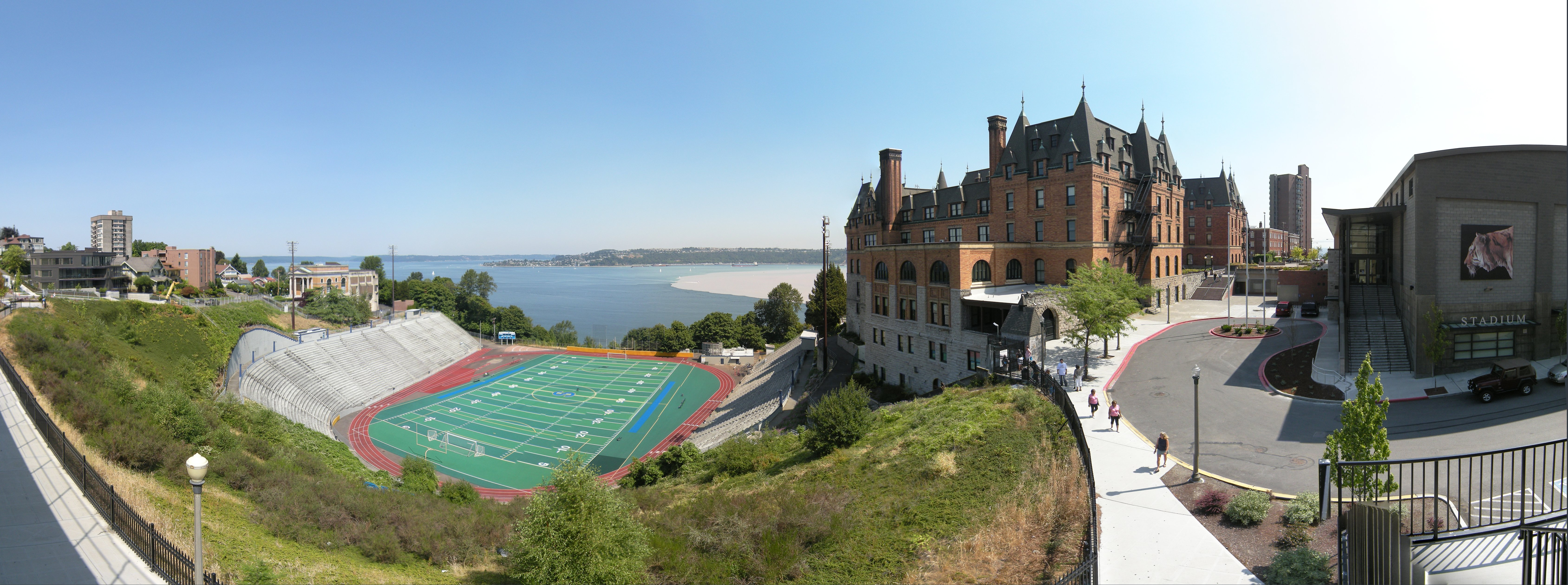
A panorama of the high school and the eponymous stadium, with Commencement Bay in the background (2008)

== Filmography ==
Stadium High School was used as a filming location for the popular 1999 teen film 10 Things I Hate About You.

- 10 Things I Hate About You (1999)
- I Love You to Death (1990)

== Notable alumni ==
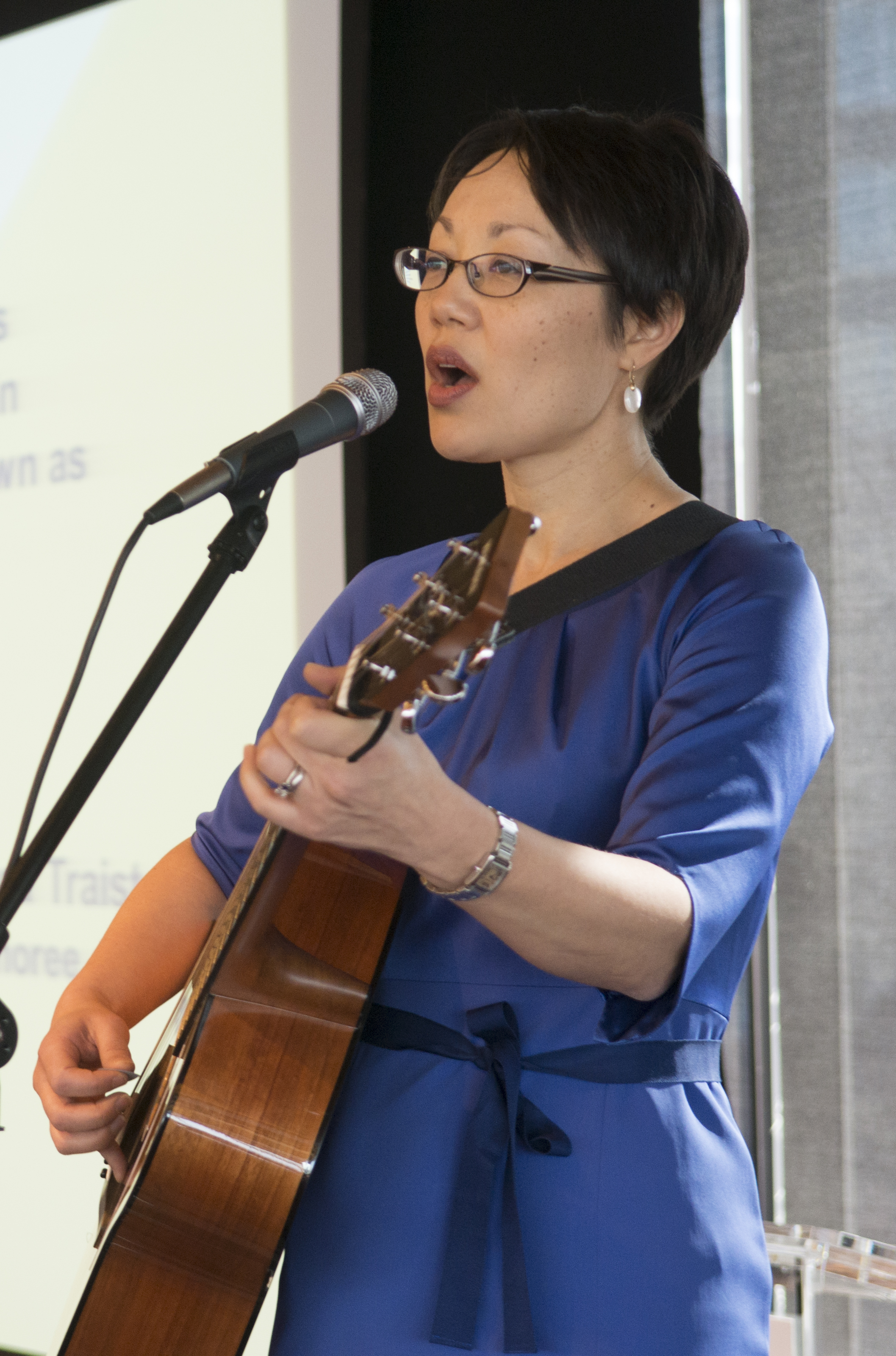
Rabbi Angela Warnick Buchdahl

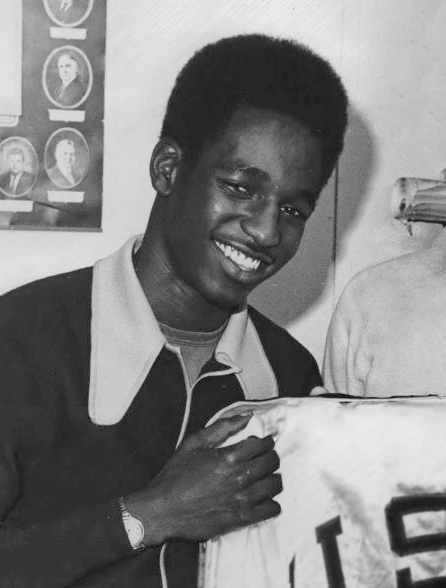
Sugar Ray Seales

- Bill Baarsma, 1960, Tacoma mayor
- Sam Baker, former NFL Pro Bowl player; transferred after his junior year
- Bruce Bennett (b. Herman Brix) 1924, Olympic shot-put medalist and Hollywood actor
- Rosemarie Bowe, 1950, actress, wife of Robert Stack
- Angela Warnick Buchdahl (born 1972), rabbi
- Cathryn Damon, 1947, stage, TV and film actress
- R. N. DeArmond, author, historian
- Jeff Durgan, professional soccer player (retired)
- James Fuller, former NFL player
- Evan Hunziker, man who spent three months in North Korean custody for illegally entering the country
- Josh Keyes, artist
- Edward LaChapelle, avalanche researcher
- Al Libke, former MLB player (Cincinnati Reds)
- Cliff Marker, former NFL player
- Vicci Martinez, acoustic-rock singer/songwriter
- Marjie Millar (b. Marjie Miller), 1949, TV and movie actress
- Murray Morgan
- Gordon Naccarato, 1972, restaurateur
- Eric T. Olson, 1969, admiral and commander of U.S. Special Operations Command
- Janis Paige (b. Donna Mae Jaden), 1940, film and theater actress
- Dixy Lee Ray, 1933, chair of federal Atomic Energy Commission, Governor of Washington
- Debbie Regala, 1963, State Senator, District 27 – D
- Irv Robbins, 1935?, co-founder of Baskin-Robbins
- Albert Rosellini, 1927, attorney, civic leader, governor of Washington
- James Sargent Russell, 1918, admiral, commander of NATO forces in Europe
- Robert McCawley Short, 1925, aviator
- Sugar Ray Seales, 1971, boxer, 1972 Olympic gold medalist and professional prizefighter
- Doug Sisk, former MLB player (New York Mets, Baltimore Orioles, Atlanta Braves)
- Jeff Stock, professional soccer player
- Jack Tuell, 1940, author and bishop in the United Methodist Church
- Shelby Van Pelt, 1998, author of Remarkably Bright Creatures
