= Colet Abedi =

Iranian American writer and producer

Colet Abedi is an Iranian American writer and producer.

== Biography ==
Colet Abedi was born in Virginia and grew up in Orange County, California. She received her Bachelor of Arts in English Literature at the University of California, Irvine and currently lives in Los Angeles, California.

== Selected works ==
In addition to working on many television programs broadcast on NBC, ABC, Fox, and most of the cable networks, she is most known for her work as Head Writer on Fox's MyNetwork TV's telenovela drama serials--Fashion House starring Bo Derek, Morgan Fairchild and American Heiress.

Abedi is the creator and executive producer of Unsealed: Alien Files and Unsealed: Conspiracy Files. Unsealed: Alien Files is on its third season in syndication. She was a producer for the shows Deal or No Deal, Celebrity Blackjack, and American Heiress.

She also co-authored several young adult novels in the FAE series under the pen name C.J. Abedi with her sister, Jasmine Abedi. Book one was released in July 2013 by Diversion Publishing Group and was an instant online bestseller. The Dark King, the second in the planned FAE trilogy was released in May 2014. FAE was inspired by the Lost Colony of Roanoke. FAE was optioned by Ridley Scott in December 2013.

Abedi's first solo novel, Mad Love, was released by Jay McGraw's publishing company, Bird Street Books, in March 2014.
