= Norwest Venture Partners =

American venture and growth equity investment firm

- Type: Private
- Industry: Venture Capital + Growth Equity
- Founded: 1961; 65 years ago
- Headquarters: Menlo Park & San Francisco
- Key people: Promod Haque; Jeff Crowe; Jon Kossow
- Total assets: $15.5 billion
- Number of employees: 125
- Website: www.nvp.com

Norwest Venture Partners (Norwest) is an American venture and growth equity investment firm. The firm targets early to late-stage venture and growth equity investments across several sectors, including cloud computing and information technology, Internet, SaaS, business and financial services, and healthcare. Headquartered in Menlo Park, California, Norwest has offices in San Francisco and subsidiaries in Mumbai, India and Tel Aviv, Israel. The firm has funded more than 700 companies since inception.

== History ==
Northwest Venture Fund, a private equity and venture capital affiliate of Norwest Corporation, was founded in Minneapolis in 1961. It later merged with Wells Fargo in 1998.

The Northwest Growth Fund grew under the leadership of CEO Robert Zicarelli, including the opening of an office in Silicon Valley. Zicarelli retired in 1988 and was succeeded by Daniel Haggerty who retired in the 1990s. George J, Still Jr. (now partner emeritus) and Promod Haque took over as managing partners in 1994.

Norwest's main LP is Wells Fargo (and Norwest Corporation before Wells Fargo merged with Norwest).

In January 2016, the firm announced Norwest Venture Partners XIII, a $1.2B fund, and Wells Fargo was the sole investor in this fund. In February 2018, the firm announced Norwest Venture Partners XIV, a $1.5B fund, in which Wells Fargo is a major investor. In November 2019, the firm announced Norwest Venture Partners XV, a $2B fund, bringing its total capital under management to $9.5B.

In December 2021, the firm announced Norwest Venture Partners XVI, a $3B fund, bringing its total capital under management to $12.5B.

In April 2024, the firm announced NVP XVII, LP, a $3B fund, bringing Norwest's total capital under management to $15.5B.

== Investments ==
Notable investments for Norwest include: Adaptive Insights, Avetta, Casper, Dairy Queen, Cray Dave, Kendra Scott, Opendoor, Plaid, Spotify, Uber, Talkspace, Udemy, Vuori and Frontline Wildfire Defense.

== See also ==
- List of venture capital firms
