= Alfred Delucchi =

American judge

Judge of Superior Court of Alameda County
- In office 1983–2006

Personal details
- Born: May 27, 1931 Oakland, California, U.S.
- Died: February 26, 2008 (aged 76)
- Education: University of California, Berkeley; Santa Clara University School of Law

Alfred Delucchi (May 27, 1931 - February 26, 2008) was a judge in the Superior Court of Alameda County. Judge Delucchi presided over, among other cases, the trial of Scott Peterson for the murder of his wife Laci Peterson as well as Tyrone Robinson's trial for the murder of Huey Newton. Judge Delucchi's record contains only one reversal.

== Biography ==
After graduating from the University of California, Berkeley in Business and Economics, Judge Delucchi graduated from Santa Clara University School of Law. In 1971, he was appointed to the bench by then-Governor Ronald Reagan.
