= Ralph B. Everett =

Ralph Everett
- Born: June 23, 1951 (age 74); Orangeburg, South Carolina, U.S.
- Education: Morehouse College (BA); Duke University (JD)
- Political party: Democratic

Ralph B. Everett (born June 23, 1951) was president and chief executive officer of the Joint Center for Political and Economic Studies, a leading African American think tank, from 2007 until 2013.

== Biography ==
A native of Orangeburg, South Carolina, Everett graduated Phi Beta Kappa from Morehouse College, earned a J.D. degree from Duke University Law School, then became a lawyer in the North Carolina Department of Labor in Raleigh, North Carolina.

In 1982, Everett was appointed the Democratic staff director and minority chief counsel of the U.S. Senate Committee on Commerce, Science and Transportation, becoming the first African American to head the staff of a Senate committee. In 1986, he was named staff director and chief counsel of the full committee, where he played a significant role in cable, broadcast and common carrier legislation.

In 1989, Everett became the first African American partner at the law firm of Paul, Hastings, Janofsky & Walker. In 1998 he was appointed as U.S. ambassador to the International Telecommunication Union's Plenipotentiary Conference in Minneapolis. That year he also led the U.S. delegation to the ITU's second World Telecommunication Development Conference in Malta.

Everett has served on several boards, including those of the National Urban League and the Center for National Policy. As of early 2007, he was on the boards of directors for Cumulus Media Inc. and the Shenandoah Life Insurance Company.
