= Jay C. Gandhi =

American judge

Jay C. Gandhi is a United States magistrate judge for the Central District of California, and made history as the first South Asian American federal judge in California, and the second Indian-American federal bench officer nationwide. As the son of Gujarati Indian immigrants, Gandhi was born in Huntington Park, California, and grew up in Hacienda Heights, California.

== Education and early career ==
Gandhi graduated Order of the Coif from the University of Southern California Law School where he wrote for the school's honor journal and worked for Erwin Chemerinsky. After law school, he served as a law clerk to U.S. District Judge Kenneth M. Hoyt of the Southern District of Texas. After completing his clerkship, Gandhi moved back to Southern California where he joined the firm of Paul Hastings LLP. He was at Paul Hastings from 1998 to 2010, and specialized in business litigation and class actions, and his practice included securities, corporate governance, consumer rights, intellectual property, and real estate. He was elected partner in 2006 and served as vice chair of the Orange County office. While he was at the firm, Gandhi worked with Santa Ana's Public Law Center to provide free legal help to those who could not afford to hire a lawyer. Gandhi also participated in the Trial Attorney Partnership with the Orange County District Attorney's office.

== Federal Judicial career ==
As a judge, Gandhi was committed to alternative dispute resolution. He was a vice-chair of the U.S. District Court's alternative dispute resolution committee, and a former co-chair of the alternative dispute resolution committee of the American Bar Association's litigation section. He is known to work directly with parties to reach resolutions in difficult cases. Gandhi is a board member of the Association of Business Trial Lawyers of Los Angeles and the South Asian Helpline And Referral Agency (SAHARA).

=== United States v. Wexler ===
On October 17, 2015, Judge Gandhi granted bail for defendant Peter Ronald Wexler, a blogger. During the bail hearing, Gandhi raised the First Amendment concerns in the case and inquired whether the prosecutors had any evidence that Mr. Wexler intended to act on the alleged threats. On October 19, 2015, the government appealed Gandhi's decision to grant bail. Gandhi's bail decision was reversed on November 6, 2015. On September 1, 2016, the jury acquitted Mr. Wexler of four counts. The jury was also unable to reach a unanimous verdict on the remaining counts and a mistrial was declared. The case was detailed in a CNN report.

== Professional career ==
After serving eight years as a U.S. Magistrate Judge for the Central District of California and twelve years at Paul Hastings LLP, including as a litigation partner, Judge Jay C. Gandhi (Ret.) transitioned to private alternative dispute resolution (ADR) practice. In April 2018, he joined the private alternative dispute resolution firm, JAMS. During his tenure at JAMS, he resolved a number of high-profile cases, including a $725 million Facebook privacy class action settlement and a $648 million settlement in a case involving a Monsanto PCB contamination. In May 2025, he joined Phillips ADR Enterprises as a mediator and arbitrator.

== Publications ==
"The Advantages of Moving First in a Mediation."
