= Gail A. Andler =

American judge

Judge, Orange County, California Superior Court (appointed in 1997 and then later elected)
- In office 1997–2017
- Appointed by: Governor Pete Wilson

Municipal Court, Orange County, California (later merged with Superior Court in 1998)
- In office 1994–1997

Personal details
- Education: University of California, Los Angeles (A.B., cum laude), Loyola Law School (J.D.)

Gail A. Andler is a retired American judge who served in the Orange County, California Superior Court for over 22 years (the first three years as a judge on the Municipal Court). She was assigned to its specialized complex civil litigation program for ten years, from 2007 until her retirement. She has been a leader in the national community of specialized business court judges, and has been acknowledged with numerous awards for her work as a trial judge. Since retiring as a judge, she has been highly sought out as a neutral in alternative dispute resolution settings. Andler has been recognized for her service to at-risk children and youth.

== Judicial service ==
In 1997, California Governor Pete Wilson appointed Andler to serve as a judge on the Superior Court of Orange County, a trial level court. Andler was later elected to the Superior Court in 1998. Before her 1997 appointment, Andler had served since 1994 as a Municipal Court judge in Orange County's Central District, located in the city of Santa Ana. In 1998, California's municipal courts were merged into the superior courts. Andler retired from the Superior Court in 2017.

In 2000, the California Judicial Council, the policy making body of the California court system, established Complex Civil Litigation Pilot Programs in a number of California county superior courts, including Orange County. The complex civil litigation docket focuses on active judicial management of complex cases with an emphasis on efficient and effective resolution of complex cases. Judges are assigned to serve in the complex civil litigation program "based on their training, experience, interest in business and complex litigation, and commitment to engaging in ongoing judicial education." The pilot program became permanent, and has continued to operate since 2000 in Orange County's superior court.

Andler was selected and assigned to the Orange County complex civil litigation program in 2007, replacing Judge Jonathan Cannon, and served in that program until her retirement in 2017. In connection with her experience as a specialized complex litigation judge, Andler has been a leader in the national community of specialized business court judges. She is a past president of the American College of Business Court Judges. She is a co-author of The Business Courts Benchbook. She served as a Business Courts Representative to the American Bar Association's Business Law Section. She has also served as chair of the Business and Corporate Litigation Committee of the American Bar Association's Business Law Section.

Andler also served two terms as presiding judge of the Orange County Superior Court Appellate Division. She became an important mentor to many young judges.

== Legal practice ==
=== Lawyer ===
Before becoming a judge, Andler was admitted to practice law in California in 1982. As a lawyer, she was in private practice and also served as a deputy district attorney in the Ventura County District Attorney's Office.

=== Alternative dispute resolution ===
After retiring as a judge in 2017, Andler has been a private neutral working for JAMS, serving as an arbitrator, mediator, and special master. She has become a highly respected and sought after neutral. In 2021, she became a Fellow of the College of Commercial Arbitrators. She is also a Fellow of the Academy of Court Appointed Neutrals. Among the matters Andler has been chosen to handle via alternative dispute resolution, in 2023 she was appointed by United States district court Judge William H. Orrick as a special master in the Juul vaping addiction lawsuits. She also was a discovery mediator in the Facebook consumer suit arising out of the Cambridge Analytica scandal. Andler has written on the value of mediating electronic discovery disputes.

Retired United States magistrate judge Jay C. Gandhi has said of Andler, "'Judge Andler represents the ideal, triple threat as a neutral–a keen eye for assessing the strengths and weaknesses of each side's case, creative and sophisticated in pursuing settlement strategies and tenacious in achieving a resolution'".

== Education ==
Andler received her A.B. degree, cum laude, from the University of California, Los Angeles, and her juris doctor degree from Loyola Law School.

== Public service for children ==
In 2024, Andler received the Children's Champion Award from the Court Appointed Special Advocates (CASA) of Orange County. CASA "supports and promotes court-appointed volunteer advocacy so every child who has experienced abuse or neglect can be safe, have a permanent home and have the opportunity to thrive". This award is presented to those who have shown an "unparalleled commitment to improving the lives of children in the Orange County child welfare system". She is a member of CASA's board of directors. She has also received the Orange County Bar Foundation Project Youth's Distinguished Judicial Fellows Award. This organization's mission is to keep at-risk youth in school.

== Awards and honors ==
Among other honors and awards;

- Andler received the Children's Champion Award from the Court Appointed Special Advocates (CASA) of Orange County (2024)
- Andler received the Orange County Bar Association's Franklin G. West Award (2024)
- Andler was honored by the American Bar Association Business Law Section's Women Business Advocates Committee for contributions to the enhancement of women in the legal profession
- The American Board of Trial Advocates recognized her as Trial Judge of the Year
- The Orange County Bar Association's Business Law Section named her as its Trial Judge of the Year
- Loyola Law School presented Andler with the Distinguished Orange County Alumni Award, "given to graduates in recognition of their professional and civic accomplishments" (2017)
- Andler was recognized by both the Orange County Women Lawyers and the Celtic Bar Association as Judge of the Year (2016)
- Andler has received the Orange County Trial Lawyers' Jerrold Oliver Award, "presented annually to a judge 'whose career reflects judicial integrity, compassion and courage'"
- Andler has received the Orange County Bar Foundation Project Youth's Distinguished Judicial Fellows Award

== Positions and memberships ==
Among other positions Andler has held;

- President of the American College of Business Court Judges
- Chair of the Business and Corporate Litigation Committee of the American Bar Association's Business Law Section (2024–2025)
- Chair of the Practice Development Committee and co-chair of the Women Business and Commercial Advocates, within the American Bar Association's Business Law Section
- Executive committee of the American Bar Association Judicial Division's National Conference of State Trial Judges
- Chair of the Judicial Council of California's Rules and Procedures Committee
- Fellow of the College of Commercial Arbitrators
- Chair of the Orange County Bar Association Masters Division
- Member of the Board of Directors of Court Appointed Special Advocates of Orange County
