= Cliff Marker =

American football player (1903–1972)

No. 11, 16
- Positions: End, Tailback

Personal information
- Born: June 13, 1903; Tacoma, Washington, U.S.
- Died: July 17, 1972 (aged 69); Tacoma, Washington, U.S.
- Listed height: 5 ft 10 in (1.78 m)
- Listed weight: 190 lb (86 kg)

Career information
- High school: Stadium (WA)
- College: Washington State

Career history
- Canton Bulldogs (1926); Frankford Yellow Jackets (1927); New York Giants (1927)

Awards and highlights
- NFL champion (1927)

Career statistics
- Games played: 16
- Stats at Pro Football Reference

Clifford Norwell Marker (June 13, 1903 – July 17, 1972) was an American professional football player who played three seasons in the National Football League (NFL), with the Canton Bulldogs, Frankford Yellow Jackets and the New York Giants. Marker won the 1927 NFL Championship with the Giants.
