= National Reverse Mortgage Lenders Association =

Trade organization based in the United States

The National Reverse Mortgage Lenders Association (NRMLA) is a U.S. trade organization for financial institutions involved in the origination and securitization of reverse mortgages, provides lobbying efforts on behalf of its member institutions.

== History and operations ==
The National Reverse Mortgage Lenders Association was founded in 1997. It is headquartered in Washington, D.C.. The NRMLA hosts industry conferences, provides lobbying efforts on behalf of its member institutions, compiles and publishes data on reverse mortgage sales, and provides marketing outreach relating to reverse mortgage issues.
