= Paul Hastings =

American multinational law firm

Paul Hastings LLP
- No. of offices: 24
- No. of attorneys: 1,175 (2025)
- Major practice areas: Finance, M&A, private equity, private credit, litigation, restructurings, white collar and government disputes, energy, infrastructure, intellectual property, employment, real estate
- Key people: Frank Lopez, Chair; Sherrese Smith, Managing Partner
- Revenue: ▲$2.68 billion (2025)
- Profit per equity partner: ▲$8.33 million (2025)
- Date founded: November 1, 1951
- Founder: Lee Paul, Robert Hastings, Leonard Janofsky
- Company type: Limited liability partnership
- Website: paulhastings.com

Paul Hastings LLP is an American multinational white-shoe law firm with more than 1,000 lawyers in 24 offices throughout North and South America, Europe, and Asia. The firm represents clients in finance, mergers and acquisitions, private equity, private credit, and litigation fields.

The firm specializes in white collar and government disputes, energy, infrastructure, and intellectual property. It is one of the largest law firms in the world in terms of revenue.

== History ==
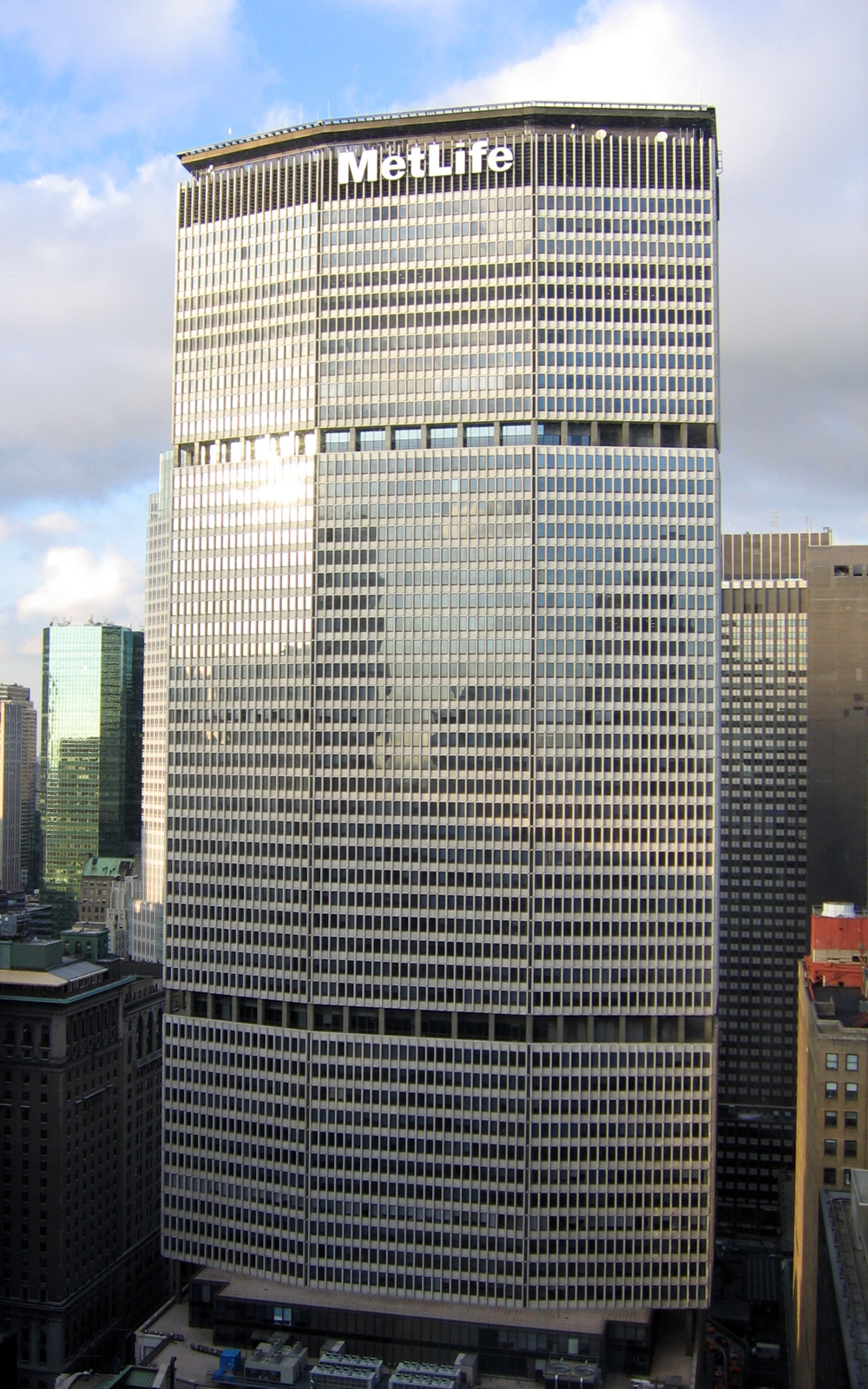
Paul Hastings' largest office is located at 200 Park Avenue, New York

Paul Hastings was founded in Los Angeles in 1951 by Lee Paul, Robert Hastings, and Leonard Janofsky. Its largest office is in New York, with additional offices located in the United States and throughout Asia, Europe, Latin America. Per the The American Lawyer, Paul Hastings has more than tripled its profit rate per partner over the last two decades.

In 2021, the firm announced that long-standing chair Seth Zachary would step down. Frank Lopez, partner and co-head of the firm's securities and capital markets practice, was voted chair-elect and became chair as of October 2022, while D.C.–based Sherrese Smith, vice chair of the firm's data privacy and cybersecurity practice, was elected managing partner.

In November 2023, amid clashes at several college campuses due to the 2023 Israel-Hamas war, Paul Hastings was one of two dozen law firms that submitted a letter to 14 American law school deans, denouncing anti-Semitism, Islamophobia, and racism. The letter also advised mentors of future law graduates about entrenched workplace policies against harassment or discrimination.

== Notable attorney partners ==
- Ronald Barak (born 1943), Olympic gymnast.
- Bradley J. Bondi, brother of former United States Attorney General Pam Bondi.
- Mandana Dayani (born 1982), Iranian-American businesswoman and media executive.
- Ralph B. Everett, first African-American partner at Paul Hastings and adviser to several U.S. presidential campaigns.
- Jay C. Gandhi, first South Asian American federal judge in California.
- Robert Luskin, specialist in white-collar crime and federal and state government investigations, adjunct professor of law at Georgetown University Law Center.
- Thomas P. O'Brien, former U.S. Attorney for the Central District of California (joined in 2009).
- Robert P. Silvers, former U.S. Under Secretary for DHS Office of Strategy, Policy, and Plans, and vice-chairman of the Paul Hastings data privacy and cybersecurity practice.

== See also ==
- List of largest law firms by profits per partner
