= Carol E. Schatz =

American civic leader

Carol E. Schatz is a Los Angeles civic leader who is credited with leading the renaissance of downtown Los Angeles in the 1990s and 2000s.

== Career ==
Schatz was president of the Central City Association of Los Angeles from 1995 to 2016, and president of the Downtown Center Business Improvement District from its founding in 1998 to her retirement in 2018. Schatz led the effort to bring people to downtown Los Angeles in the hours outside the 9-to-5 workday. Through her work the downtown Los Angeles area added new housing units, new business, and new jobs. Schatz’s initiatives included proposing and advocating for the passage of the Adaptive Reuse Ordinance in 1999 that made it easier to renovate old office buildings into housing, transforming downtown. Schatz also aggressively pushed for the LA Live and Staples Center projects, which brought a sports arena and entertainment center to downtown Los Angeles.

== Awards and honors ==
In 2012, she was recognized as civilian of the year by the Central Area Community Police Station in Los Angeles. In 2015, the Los Angeles Business Journal named her corporate advocate of the year". In 2018, the Los Angeles City Council voted to name the intersection of Hope Street and Wilshire Boulevard, “Carol Schatz Square”.

== Personal life ==
Schatz was born and raised in Los Angeles. Prior to her work in downtown Los Angeles, Schatz earned a Bachelor of Arts degree from the University of California at Berkeley and her Juris Doctor from Loyola Law School.
