= Jasmine Abedi =

American writer, tv producer and attorney ()

- Born: Ghazaleh Jasmine Abedi; Colorado, U.S.
- Education: University of California, Irvine (BA); Loyola Marymount University (JD)
- Occupations: Entertainment lawyer, writer, television producer

Ghazaleh Jasmine Abedi (born May 27) is an American writer, television producer, and entertainment attorney, of Iranian descent.

== Early life and education ==
Abedi was born in Colorado. She received her Bachelor of Arts in Social Sciences from University of California, Irvine, and her Juris Doctor degree from Loyola Law School. As an entertainment attorney she has worked on many television programs for Fox, NBCUniversal, ABC, MTV, Food Network, Bravo, and E!.

== Career ==
She was also the Executive Producer of television programs Posh Tots for HGTV, and the television pilots Club Bounce for TruTV, Divas for VH-1, and Life With The Clarks for CMT.

She and her sister Colet Abedi are co-authors of the young adult best selling novels Fae, The Dark King, and The Queen both published by Diversion Books. Oscar-winning director and producer Ridley Scott optioned the movie rights of Fae, the first installment of the three book trilogy.

In 2011, she co-founded natural cosmetic company Generation Klean, Inc. with JD Larsen, and continues in the co-CEO role.
