= Salvador Anzelmo =

American politician and lawyer

Salvador "Sam" Anzelmo (November 22, 1920 – June 1, 2014) was an American politician and lawyer.

Born in Chicago, Illinois, Anzelmo moved back to New Orleans, Louisiana with his family. He went to Warren Easton High School and Louisiana State University and then served in the United States Army during World War II. In 1950, he graduated from Loyola Law School and then practiced law. He served in the Louisiana House of Representatives from 1960 to 1972. He then as an attorney for the Louisiana State Legislature and then New Orleans city attorney. He died in Deland, Florida, and was interred at Florida National Cemetery.
