= Murder of Laci Peterson =

2002 murder in Modesto, California, US

- Laci Peterson in 2002
- Location: Modesto, California, U.S.
- Date: c. December 24, 2002; 23 years ago
- Deaths: 2 (Note: Including an unborn child.)
- Perpetrator: Scott Peterson
- Convictions: First-degree murder with special circumstances; Second-degree murder
- Sentence: Death; reduced to life imprisonment without the possibility of parole after appeal

On December 24, 2002, 27‑year‑old Laci Denise Peterson disappeared from her home in Modesto, California, while eight months pregnant with her first child. Her disappearance prompted a large‑scale search and drew national media attention. In April 2003, the remains of Peterson and her unborn son, whom she and her husband had planned to name Conner, were found along the shoreline of San Francisco Bay. Her husband, Scott Lee Peterson, was arrested shortly afterward and charged with two counts of murder. In 2004, he was convicted of the first degree murder of Laci and the second degree murder of Conner. Scott Peterson's death sentence was overturned in 2020, and in 2021 Peterson was re‑sentenced to life in prison without the possibility of parole.

== Early life and marriage ==
=== Laci Peterson ===
Laci Peterson was born Laci Denise Rocha on May 4, 1975. She was the younger of two children born to Sharon (née Anderson) and Dennis Robert Rocha, with a brother named Brent (born 1971). Her parents had met in high school and owned a dairy farm west of Escalon, California.

Laci worked on the dairy farm from a young age and also enjoyed gardening with her mother. Laci's parents divorced in 1977 when she and her brother were young. Subsequently, their mother moved with the children to Modesto; Laci visited her father at the dairy farm on weekends.

Laci's mother developed a long-term relationship with Ron Grantski, although they never married; Grantski would help raise the children from the time Laci was two years old, effectively becoming her step-father. Laci was a cheerleader in junior high and high school. After graduating from Thomas Downey High School, she attended California Polytechnic State University, majoring in ornamental horticulture.

=== Scott Peterson ===
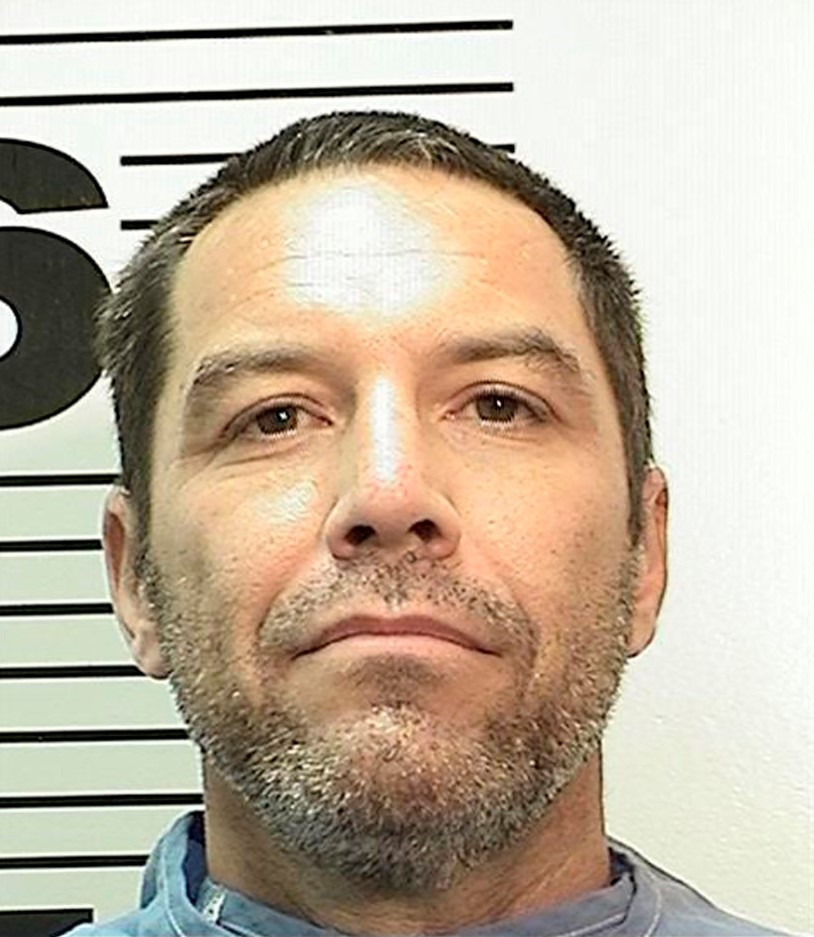
Scott Peterson in a 2022 prison photograph

Scott Lee Peterson was born on October 24, 1972, in San Diego, California, to Lee Arthur Peterson, who owned a crate-packaging company, and Jacqueline "Jackie" Helen Latham, who owned a boutique in La Jolla called The Put On. Lee and Jackie had six children from previous relationships. Scott was their only child together. As a child, Scott shared a bedroom with his half-brother John in the family's two-bedroom apartment in La Jolla. He began playing golf at an early age, and, by age 14, he could beat his father at the game. For a time, Scott had dreams of becoming a professional golfer, and he was teammates with future-pro Phil Mickelson at the University of San Diego High School. By the end of high school, he was one of the top junior golfers in San Diego.

In 1990, Scott enrolled at Arizona State University (where Mickelson had also enrolled) on a partial golf scholarship. Scott's father, Lee, later testified that Scott was discouraged by the considerable competition that Mickelson and an unnamed future pro presented. According to Chip Couch, the father of another young golfer, Chris Couch, Scott was taken off the golf team after Chip discovered that Scott had taken Chris out drinking while Chris was visiting Arizona State for a recruiting trip. Chip complained to the Arizona State golf coach, who subsequently kicked Scott off the team. Scott transferred to Cuesta College and then to California Polytechnic State University. Initially planning to major in international business, Scott ultimately graduated with a degree in agricultural business in 1998. Professors who taught Scott described him as a model student. His agribusiness professor, Jim Ahern, commented, "I wouldn't mind having a class full of Scott Petersons."

=== Relationship ===
While at Cal Poly, Scott worked at Pacific Café, a restaurant in Morro Bay. Laci would occasionally visit the restaurant to see a friend who also worked there. In mid-1994, Laci sent Scott her phone number; she also told her mother that she had met the man that she would marry. Scott later called Laci, and they began dating. As the relationship grew more serious, Scott put aside his dreams of professional golf in order to focus on a business career.

The couple dated for two years and eventually moved in together. In 1997, after Laci graduated, they married at Sycamore Mineral Springs Resort. While Scott finished his senior year, Laci took a job in nearby Prunedale. Prosecutors later stated that, around this time, Scott engaged in his first extramarital affair, though they did not reveal the details of the relationship. Scott graduated with a Bachelor of Science degree in agricultural business in June 1998, and the Petersons opened a sports bar in San Luis Obispo called The Shack. The Petersons decided to put The Shack up for sale when they moved to Laci's hometown of Modesto, California, to start a family; they completed the sale in April 2001.

In October 2000, the Petersons purchased a three-bedroom, two-bath bungalow for $177,000 on Covena Avenue in an upscale neighborhood near East La Loma Park. Laci took a part-time job as a substitute teacher, and Scott got a job with Tradecorp U.S.A., a newly founded subsidiary of a European fertilizer company, for which he earned a salary of $5,000 a month before taxes.

Laci's family, including her mother and younger sister, related that she devoted much of her energy towards being the perfect housewife and that she enjoyed cooking, entertaining and watching Martha Stewart. In 2002, Laci discovered she was pregnant; her due date was February 10, 2003. The couple had planned to name their son Conner. In November 2002, Scott was introduced by a friend to Amber Frey, a Fresno massage therapist, and the two began a romantic relationship.

== Laci's disappearance ==
On December 23, 2002, at 5:45 p.m., Laci and Scott went to Salon Salon, the workplace of Laci's sister Amy Rocha. Amy cut Scott's hair, as she did each month. Scott offered to pick up a fruit basket that Amy had ordered because he would be playing golf the next day at a course near the retailer. Prosecutors say Scott also told other people he would play golf on Christmas Eve. Laci's mother, Sharon, spoke with Laci on the telephone around 8:30 that evening. The last three people known to have spoken to Laci before she disappeared were Amy, Sharon, and Scott.

Scott later told police that he last saw his wife at about 9:30 a.m. on December 24, when he left to go fishing at the Berkeley Marina. He said Laci was watching a Martha Stewart TV show about meringue and preparing to mop the floor, bake cookies, and walk the family dog to a nearby park. Karen Servas, a neighbor of the Petersons, said that she found the Petersons' dog, a Golden Retriever named McKenzie, alone outside the home and returned him to the Petersons' back yard at around 10:30 a.m. She later testified that she had found the dog at 10:18. Another neighbor, Mike Chiavetta, said he saw McKenzie at about 10:45 a.m., as he played catch with his own dog. The Modesto Bee reported that an unnamed female neighbor found the dog with a muddy leash, wandering in the neighborhood. That neighbor put the dog in the Petersons' yard, not observing that anything was out of place. At 2:15 p.m., Scott left a message for Laci, stating, "Hey, Beautiful. It's 2:15. I'm leaving Berkeley."

Scott said when he returned home that afternoon, Laci's car was in the driveway, and the house was empty. He also said that he found McKenzie in their back yard and that he relayed this to Laci's mother, Sharon. She later denied his account in her book. Scott showered and washed his clothes. A neighbor of Scott's later said that Scott had knocked on his door, asking if he had seen Laci. The neighbor and his wife both testified overhearing Scott saying that he had been golfing that day and had tried to call Laci. A relative of Laci's would also later testify that, when friends and family began gathering at the Peterson home that night, Scott said he had earlier gone to play golf.

Scott called his mother-in-law, Sharon, to ask if Laci was with her; Sharon subsequently said that call was when she learned Laci was missing. Scott and Laci's stepfather both reported Laci missing. The police received the report of her disappearance shortly before 6 p.m. At the time of her disappearance, Laci was seven-and-a-half months pregnant, with a due date of February 10, 2003. The story attracted nationwide media interest.

=== Search and investigation ===
Modesto Police detectives Allen Brocchini and Jon Buehler responded to the missing person call and became the lead investigators for the case. Upon their arrival at the Peterson home, the detectives interviewed Scott and performed a cursory search of the home. Scott told detectives he had been fishing for sturgeon at the Berkeley Marina, approximately 90 miles from the couple's Modesto home. The detectives found Laci's keys, wallet, sunglasses, and purse in a closet and began organizing a search of the area.

The following day, over 900 of Laci's family, friends, and neighbors searched the neighborhood and posted missing-person flyers. At a press conference, detective Al Brocchini said police did not believe Laci left without contacting her family: "That is completely out of character for her." Over thirty Modesto police and firefighters on foot, horseback, bicycles, and watercraft used canine units and searchlight-equipped helicopters to search Dry Creek and the surrounding area. Laci's disappearance and the extensive search efforts attracted nationwide media interest.

A $25,000 reward—later increased to $250,000 and, finally, to $500,000—was offered for information leading to Laci's safe return. Posters, blue and yellow ribbons, and flyers were circulated. The original, basic version of the LaciPeterson.com website was launched by the husband of one of Laci's friends. Family, friends, and volunteers set up a command center at the Red Lion Hotel to take phone calls, record developments, and circulate information. Over 1500 volunteers distributed information, worked at the command center, searched for Laci, and held candlelight vigils with Scott for Laci.

Almost immediately, Modesto Police detectives Allen Brocchini and Jon Buehler suspected foul play. As they continued the investigation, Brocchini and Buehler became increasingly suspicious of Scott. Buehler told ABC News in 2017, "I suspected Scott when I first met him. Didn't mean he did it, but I was a little bit thrown off by his calm, cool demeanor and his lack of questioning ... he wasn't, 'Will you call me back? Can I have one of your cards? What are you guys doing now?'" Buehler further described Scott's behavior as, "a strange combination of polite and arrogant, disaffectedly distant and impatiently irritable. He just didn't seem like a man who was crushed or even greatly disturbed by his wife's disappearance and possible death." The Rocha family defended Scott, describing him and Laci as the ideal couple.

=== Discovery of affair ===
The nationwide media coverage produced several tips and possible sightings, one of which was from a woman who identified herself as Scott's girlfriend. On December 30, 2002, Amber Frey informed detectives she had met Scott on November 20, and he said he was single. Additionally, Frey told detectives Scott said on December 9, he was a widower and this Christmas would be his first without his wife. Based on the dates and information Frey provided, detectives now believed Scott began planning to kill Laci two weeks before Laci's disappearance. Hoping Scott would confess or reveal information about his involvement in Laci's disappearance, detectives gave Frey a device with which to record her conversations with Scott.

On January 15, 2003, detectives informed Laci's immediate family of Scott's affair with Amber. Upon learning of Scott's involvement with Amber Frey, Sharon Rocha told detectives she believed Scott killed Laci. On January 24, Sharon, Ron, and Laci's brother Brent held a press conference in which Brent said Scott had, in a phone call on January 16, told Brent he was having an affair with a woman in Fresno. Brent also said that he and his family have withdrawn their support of Scott due to his lack of communication and cooperation. Later the same day, Amber Frey held a press conference and explained her role in the investigation.

=== Discovery of bodies ===
On April 13, 2003, two people walking their dog found the body of a male fetus on a tidal flat of the San Francisco Bay shore near Marina Bay in Richmond. The following day, a jogger spotted a human torso in the riprap along the shoreline of Point Isabel Regional Park, approximately one mile from where the body of the fetus was found. On April 18, 2003, DNA tests verified the bodies were Laci and her unborn son, Conner.

The autopsies on both bodies were performed by forensic pathologist Dr. Brian Peterson (no relation). Although a judge sealed the autopsy results, an anonymous Associated Press source revealed Conner's body had minor decomposition, mutilations on his right side, and a length of nylon cord wrapped around his body. The source of the mutilations and how the cord became wrapped around Conner's body could not be conclusively determined.

Laci's body was bloated, severely decomposed, and missing its head, arms, lower legs, and internal organs. The autopsy revealed Laci had two fractured ribs and neck vertebrae, but her uterus and cervix were intact. Neither Laci's date of death nor whether the broken ribs and vertebrae occurred postmortem could be conclusively determined. Laci's missing head and limbs led to rumors that Scott had dismembered Laci beforehand, but Dr. Peterson found no human-made incisions. Dr. Peterson and state forensic pathologists testified the missing organs and disarticulation were conditions consistent with a body weighted at the wrists and ankles and submerged in seawater for several months. Laci's head, arms, and legs were never recovered.

Dr. Peterson concluded Conner had died in utero and his body was expelled from Laci's decomposing corpse when the skin over the abdominal cavity ruptured due to natural decompositional processes. Seawater entered the abdominal cavity and washed out most of Laci's internal organs, as well as Conner.

=== Post-discovery investigation and developments ===
The discovery of Laci's and Conner's bodies changed the case status from missing person to homicide and allowed the detectives to expand their investigation of Scott Peterson as the prime suspect. The FBI and Modesto Police Department performed forensic searches of the Peterson home. Using mitochondrial DNA testing, the FBI linked a hair wrapped around a pair of pliers found in Scott's fishing boat to hairs recovered from Laci's hairbrush. Police searched Scott's truck, toolbox, and warehouse, and found a homemade concrete anchor in the boat Scott purchased two weeks before he reported Laci missing.

Scott told detectives he used a 90-pound bag of concrete to make one boat anchor and used the rest of the concrete to repair his driveway. When Detective Henry "Dodge" Hendee searched Scott's warehouse on December 27, he found cement powder on the boat trailer and five circular marks matching the size and shape of the bucket used to make the anchor. Hendee also found a sledgehammer and a dustpan covered with cement powder. Prosecutors alleged Scott made five anchors and used four – one tied to each of Laci's wrists and ankles – to sink Laci's body in San Francisco Bay. After Scott was arrested, police searched the San Francisco Bay for the anchors, but nothing was found.

Using a GPS locator they had placed on Scott's car, detectives Brocchini and Buehler tracked Scott to San Diego. Anticipating that Peterson was planning to evade arrest by fleeing to Mexico, the detectives immediately began electronically monitoring Peterson's activities but discovered Peterson had switched vehicles, rendering their GPS locator useless.

== Criminal action ==
=== Arrest and arraignment ===
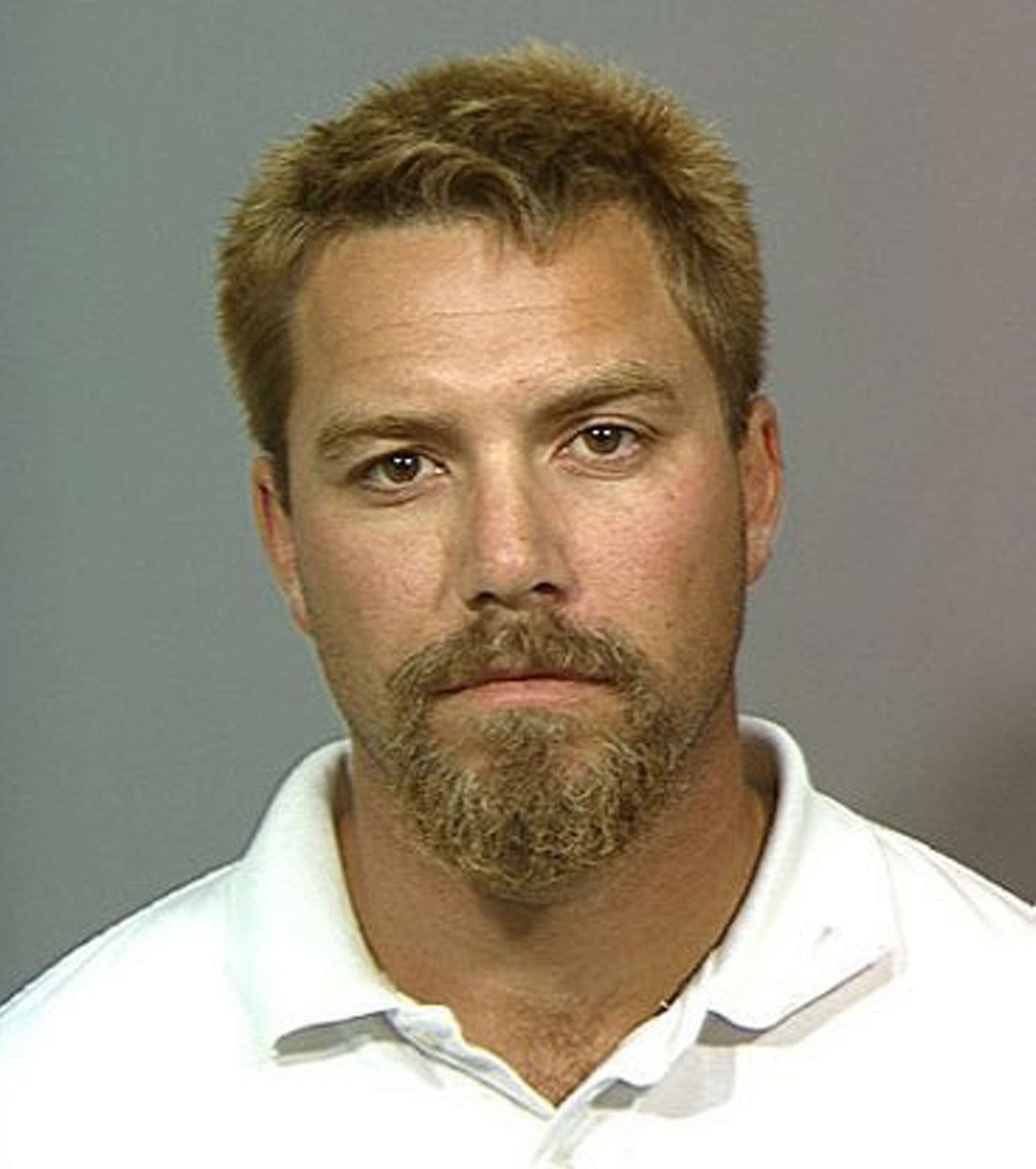
Scott Peterson following his 2003 arrest

Police increased their surveillance of Peterson, following his car and monitoring his location by listening to his cell phone calls. Since Peterson had switched vehicles and was less than thirty miles from the Mexican border, detectives were certain Peterson was planning to flee to Mexico.

Said Detective Brocchini in a 2017 interview: "We've got to find Scott right now. He told me he was [at Brooks Island] and that's where the bodies come (sic) up? I believe it was premeditated, he planned it ... San Diego was pretty darn close to the Mexican border. Scott knew the area pretty well. That's where his parents lived. That's where he lived. So it wasn't like he was going to have to get on MapQuest to figure out a way to get to Tijuana."

On April 18, 2003, detectives arrested Peterson at Torrey Pines Golf Course in La Jolla as he was meeting his father and brother for a golf game. When detectives arrested Peterson, detectives discovered Peterson had changed his appearance by growing a beard and dyeing it and his hair blonde. Detectives also discovered Peterson's vehicle was packed with camping and survival equipment, several changes of clothes, four cell phones, Viagra tablets, nearly $15,000 in cash, and two driver licenses: his own and his brother's.

Lee Peterson, Scott's father, explained Scott used his brother's license to get a San Diego resident discount at the golf course and was living in his car to avoid media attention and harassment. Police and prosecutors alleged the switched car, dyed hair, money, phones, driver licenses, and camping equipment indicated Peterson was trying to disguise himself and planning to flee to Mexico.

Detectives Brocchini and Buehler drove Peterson back to Modesto, where Peterson was booked into the Stanislaus County Jail. On April 21, 2003, Peterson was arraigned in Stanislaus County Superior Court and charged with two felony counts of murder with premeditation and special circumstances, to which he pleaded not guilty. Because of the intense publicity, community involvement, and the small pool of potential jurors in Stanislaus County, Judge Al Girolami moved the trial to San Mateo County to avoid defense accusations of juror bias and ensure Peterson received a fair trial.

=== Trial ===
Before his arraignment, Peterson had been represented by Kirk McAllister, a veteran criminal defense attorney from Modesto. Chief Deputy Public Defender Kent Faulkner was also assigned to the case. Peterson later indicated he could afford a private attorney, namely Mark Geragos, who had done other high-profile criminal defense work. Scott's trial began on June 1, 2004, and was followed closely by the news media. The lead prosecutor was Rick Distaso and Geragos led Scott's defense. Prosecution witness Frey hired her own attorney, Gloria Allred, to represent her.

On June 23, 2004, one of the jurors was dismissed by Judge Alfred Delucchi after Delucchi spent two hours in his chambers questioning each of the jurors. Prior to Delucchi's June 21 interview, the aforementioned juror had been recorded on video speaking to Laci's brother, Brent Rocha. Delucchi had initially stated that this exchange had not warranted removal. He did not give a reason for the juror's later dismissal, although the transcript of Delucchi's session with him indicated that the juror had admitted that his girlfriend and others had spoken to him about news reports of his encounter with Rocha. Delucchi furthermore warned the remaining jurors not to read, watch, or listen to media coverage of the trial.

==== Opening statements ====
In opening statements, the prosecution said they would show that Scott had killed his wife because he was having an affair with Frey. The state chiefly detailed Scott's behavior in the days before and after his wife was reported missing, including telling others he had been golfing and asking police if they had used cadaver dogs to investigate the park in which Laci was supposed to have walked their dog. The defense conceded that Scott was "a cad" for cheating on Laci but ridiculed the prosecution's theory that Scott was going to "chuck this entire life he had" for a masseuse mistress he had taken on only four dates. Geragos said that the police had rushed to judgment, noting that the police had discredited Scott's claim that Laci was watching a segment of Martha Stewart Living on making meringues because, they stated, no meringue was mentioned on that program that morning.

But Geragos played a tape in court of that day's morning episode, which showed that the segment was about baking meringues. Finally, Geragos emphasized the prosecution's lack of forensic evidence. He dismissed a hair of Laci's found in Scott's boat because Laci had visited the boat a few days before her disappearance and could have left it then.

==== Theory ====
Lacking direct evidence to link Scott to the crime, prosecutors chiefly relied on circumstantial evidence, pointing, in particular to Scott's behavior before, during, and after Laci's disappearance. Through various witnesses, the prosecution suggested Scott had several motives for killing Laci—that he was tired of his marriage, that he felt pressure from her pregnancy, that he wanted to continue his affair with Frey, and that he was under mounting financial pressure. Prosecutors claimed that on the night of December 23rd, 2002, Scott strangled Laci in her sleep before taking her body from the home on his truck to his boat trailer, where he made cement anchors to weigh his wife's body down in the water. According to the prosecution, Scott then dragged her body to the boat, sailed the boat into the water, tied the anchors to her body before throwing her anchored body into the San Francisco Bay by the start of the 24th. Prosecutors then believe that Scott disposed of the clothes he wore, sent the message to Laci's phone to create an alibi, before returning home to Modesto.

==== Evidence ====
Sharon Rocha testified that when she went to East La Loma park to search for Laci, she saw Scott there, but she said Scott did not acknowledge her calling out to him and that he later "angled away" from her attempts to hug him and failed to attend a candlelight vigil. Two other relatives of Laci said Scott had shown little emotion during Laci's disappearance, and three witnesses testified that Scott had told them he had been golfing, not fishing, after Laci's disappearance.

The prosecution called on various witnesses to establish that Scott changed his appearance, purchased a vehicle using his mother's name, and added two pornographic television channels to his cable service days after his wife's disappearance. A realtor testified that, in January 2003, Scott expressed interest in selling the house he had shared with Laci, saying he did not want her to have to live in the home if she were to be found alive. A car salesman testified that Scott had traded in Laci's Land Rover for a Dodge pick-up truck after her disappearance. Frey testified as to her affair with Scott, and the jury heard the secretly recorded telephone calls between the pair; in one, recorded after Laci disappeared, Scott falsely said he was in Paris. As to the Petersons' financial condition, an auditor testified for the prosecution that the couple had been living beyond their means and accumulated $23,000 in credit-card debt. During cross examination, the auditor also stated that Scott had paid all of his bills on time and had $50,000 of credit available on other cards.

Prosecution witness Rodney Oswalt said that neither of two hair follicles found on Scott's boat belonged to Scott, though he said he could not determine whether they belonged to Laci. Karen Korsberg, an FBI trace evidence expert, said she matched one of the hairs to a hair found in Laci's hairbrush through mitochondrial DNA tests. The prosecution further suggested that the hair must have come from Laci's dead body because she had not seen the boat while alive. Defense lawyers argued that mitochondrial testing was not a reliable means of DNA comparison—only half of states in the U.S. allowed the practice—and further contended that Laci had, in fact, been on the boat while alive. A witness reported that she had seen Laci at the warehouse with the boat the day before she was reported missing. On the stand, Detective Allen Brocchini explained that he had "excised" that witness's statement from his police report.

Prosecution witness Robert O'Neill was asked to comment on Scott's claim that he had used a 90-pound bag of cement to make a single anchor and pave his driveway. O'Neill said that the material in the anchor did not match a sample of concrete from the driveway because the driveway sample featured large, gravel-like chunks. Conversely, for the defense, Steven Gabler, a concrete expert, testified that the samples were consistent. Gabler said that the gravel chunks had adhered to the driveway's concrete because the concrete was poured on top of those chunks. Scott's defense attorney, Mark Geragos, also pointed out that no such anchors were found after a search of the floor of San Francisco Bay with sonar equipment accurate enough to locate objects as small as a tin can. But Geoffrey Baehr, who helped lead more than 15 diving expeditions off the Berkeley Marina to search for Laci, testified that thick mud, strong currents, dark waters, and a strong surge can make it "virtually impossible" for such equipment to locate an object even when the target is known and that this is why they did not find Laci's body or any anchors. To emphasize this point, Baehr related that when his crew accidentally dropped the underwater sonar device into the water, it took four diving trips to locate it, even though the crew knew precisely where it had landed.

Ralph Cheng, a hydrologist with the United States Geological Survey and an expert witness on tides of the San Francisco Bay, testified as a witness for the prosecution. He suggested that Laci may have been dumped near where Scott had said he was fishing. During cross-examination, Cheng admitted that his findings were "probable, not precise".

Scott's defense lawyers based their case on the lack of direct evidence, and played down the significance of circumstantial evidence. They also questioned whether the investigation was thorough, since Modesto Police Detective Mike Hermos admitted he did not check the alibi of a prostitute who was accused of stealing checks from Scott's mailbox. Hermos did not indicate that the woman was ever a suspect, and prosecutor Dave Harris noted that the checks were stolen after Laci vanished, precluding the woman from involvement in her disappearance. A police community-service officer testified that the playback of an interview with Scott had no sound because no batteries had been placed in the tape recorder that was used to record it. Other detectives were called to testify about the extensive search for evidence.

The defense suggested the fetal remains were of a full-term infant and theorized that someone kidnapped Laci, held her until she gave birth and then dumped both bodies in the bay. The prosecution's medical experts contended that the fetus was not full-term and died at the same time as his mother. As to this matter, Dr. Charles March, a fertility specialist, was expected to be a crucial witness for the defense. March said that the Petersons' unborn fetus could not have died any earlier than December 29, 2002. Under cross-examination, March said he had based his finding on a report by one of Laci's friends, who said that Laci had told her that a June 9, 2002, at-home pregnancy test had produced a positive reading. But the prosecution criticized March for having relied on a friend's report. After prosecutors criticized March for a typo in his report, he remarked, "Cut me some slack."

==== Verdict and sentencing ====
One juror was removed and replaced during deliberations due to misconduct, after she conducted independent research on the case. The jury foreman (an attorney) requested his own removal, most likely because his fellow jurors wanted to replace him as foreman. Geragos told reporters that the foreman had mentioned threats he received when he requested to be removed from the jury. The foreman was replaced by an alternate.

On November 12, 2004, the jury convicted Scott of two counts of murder: first-degree murder with special circumstances for killing Laci, and second-degree murder for killing the fetus (i.e. Conner) she carried. The penalty phase of the trial began on November 30, and concluded December 13, when the jury rendered a sentence of death. On March 16, Judge Delucchi followed the jury verdict, sentencing Scott to death by lethal injection and ordering him to pay $10,000 toward the cost of Laci's funeral; the money would go to Sharon Rocha and her long-term partner Ron Grantski as they were the ones who set up the funeral. He described the murder of Laci as "cruel, uncaring, heartless, and callous".

In later press appearances, members of the jury stated that they believed Scott's demeanor—specifically his lack of emotion and the phone calls to Frey in the days following Laci's disappearance—indicated his guilt. Juror no. 1, Greg Beratlis, and two other jurors, said they based their verdict on "hundreds of small 'puzzle pieces' of circumstantial evidence that came out during the trial, from the location of Laci's body to the myriad lies her husband told after her disappearance".

On October 21, 2005, a judge ruled that proceeds from a $250,000 life insurance policy Scott took out on Laci would go to Laci's mother. This was reaffirmed by the Fifth District Court of Appeal on October 31, 2007.

Scott arrived at San Quentin State Prison in the early morning hours of Thursday, March 17, 2005. He was reported not to have slept the night before, being too "jazzed" to sleep. He joined the more than 700 other inmates in California's sole death row facility during the appeals process.

=== Appeal and post-conviction action ===
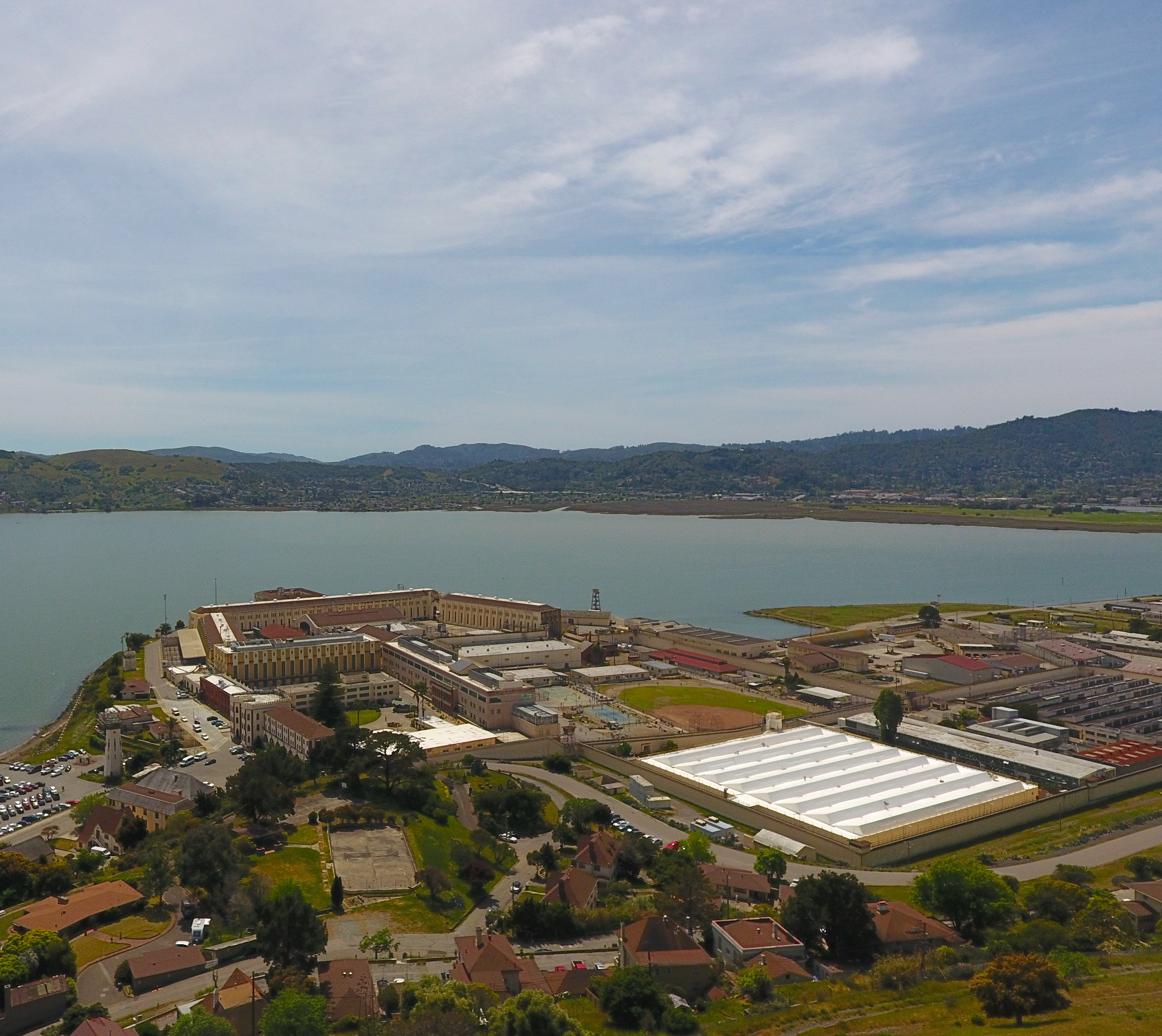
San Quentin State Prison, where Scott was incarcerated while on death row

==== Direct appeal ====
Scott's automatic appeal of his death sentence was filed in the Supreme Court of California on July 5, 2012. The next day, Scott's attorney, Cliff Gardner, filed a 423-page brief contesting the sentence, arguing that the publicity surrounding the trial, incorrect evidentiary rulings, and other mistakes deprived Scott of a fair trial. The State Attorney General's office filed their response brief on January 26, 2015. The defense filed a response to the State's brief in July 2015, claiming that a certified dog that detected Laci's scent at Berkeley Marina had failed two-thirds of tests with similar conditions.

In June 2020, the California Supreme Court heard argument on Scott's direct appeal. (Note: In the interim, on March 13, 2019, California Governor Gavin Newsom issued a moratorium for all 737 prisoners on death row in California, including Scott. The order postponed all executions for the duration of Newsom's tenure as governor. California had not executed a prisoner since 2006 due to legal challenges to the state's execution protocol. Newsom's order spared the approximately 25 prisoners on death row who had exhausted their legal appeals and could have had their executions move forward once the legal challenge was resolved. Scott's sister-in-law Janey Peterson welcomed Newsom's decision but noted that his case was likely to be unaffected by it, and did not believe Scott would exhaust all of his legal challenges by January 2027, when Newsom would be leaving office, assuming his re-election in 2022.) The defense argued that prospective jurors were improperly excused; that the trial judge improperly allowed two jurors onto Scott's boat; that the judge erred in insisting the prosecution be present during defense testing of the boat; and that the motion to move the trial to another county should have been granted due to juror questionnaire results showing almost half of the prospective jurors had already concluded Scott was guilty prior to the trial. The prosecution countered that the California Supreme Court should overturn the verdict only if it were to find that a prospective juror was improperly dismissed and that "there was 'no credible claim' that any of the 12 jurors who decided [Scott's] fate were unfair or partial."

On August 24, 2020, in a 7–0 decision, the Supreme Court of California upheld Scott's conviction but overturned his death sentence; the court found that Scott's trial judge had improperly dismissed jurors who opposed capital punishment without asking them whether they could put their views aside. Justice Leondra Kruger explained that, per Supreme Court rulings since 1968, "Jurors may not be excused merely for opposition to the death penalty, but only for views rendering them unable to fairly consider imposing that penalty in accordance with their oath. This is the meaning of the guarantee of an impartial jury." Prosecutors initially stated that they would retry the penalty phase, but subsequently reversed that decision in June 2021.

On September 22, 2021, California Superior Court Judge Anne-Christine Massullo ruled that Scott would be re-sentenced to life in prison without the possibility of parole. The following month, Massullo scheduled a hearing on that matter for December 8. On December 8, Massullo re-sentenced Scott to life in prison without the possibility of parole, for the first-degree murder of Laci, and a concurrent sentence of 15 years to life for the second-degree murder of Conner.

In October 2022, following several delays, Scott was transferred from San Quentin's death row to Mule Creek State Prison in Ione, California to serve his new life sentence.

==== Habeas petition ====
In November 2015, Scott filed a habeas corpus petition. While the direct appeal could only challenge errors made by the trial judge, Scott's habeas petition could include new evidence. Among other bases for relief, Scott contended that a juror lied on her jury application and that there was evidence that neighbors saw Laci alive after Scott left home.

On August 10, 2017, the State Attorney General filed a 150-page response arguing that the habeas petition ignored "overwhelming evidence" that Scott murdered Laci. Supervising Deputy Attorney General Donna Provenzano discounted eyewitness spotting of Laci, saying that such sightings "were legion", while noting 74 reported sightings in 26 states and overseas, most of which she stated, were neither viable nor corroborated. In August 2018, Scott's legal team filed their reply, emphasizing six claims of "deficient performance" by trial attorney Mark Geragos, such as failing to call experts in fetal growth, dog scent, how bodies move in water, stating that he would call witnesses but failing to follow through, and failing to properly address burglary evidence.

In October 2020, the California Supreme Court, in response to the habeas petition, issued a show-cause order instructing the lower court to consider the question of juror misconduct.

On December 20, 2022, Judge Massullo denied Scott's habeas petition, which had been based, in part, on the allegation that a juror committed misconduct when she lied about her own history of domestic abuse during jury selection. Scott's appeal said that her history had tainted the jury. Massullo concluded that there was no evidence to support this accusation, explaining that the juror did not intentionally conceal this information with the motive to stay on the jury, nor did she appear vengeful toward Scott in letters she later wrote him in the prison. Massullo wrote, "The Court concludes that Juror No. 7's responses were not motivated by pre-existing or improper bias against [Scott], but instead were the result of a combination of good faith misunderstanding of the questions and sloppiness in answering." Scott still had the legal option of appealing her ruling.

==== LA Innocence Project ====
On March 12, 2024, Scott attended a status hearing in Redwood City that had been granted by a San Mateo County judge in response to a request by LA Innocence Project (LAIP), a nonprofit legal advocacy organization that accepted Peterson's case two months prior. The Project said it had new evidence from the trial, which the Project said supported Peterson's claims of innocence.

On April 23, the prosecution responded to the new push for DNA testing, describing it as "unnecessary". He noted that Scott Peterson had lied about the circumstances surrounding his wife's murder and that such DNA testing was already done in 2013 and again in 2019. In May 2024, a judge granted Peterson's motion to allow DNA testing on one single item of evidence - a piece of duct tape found on Laci's pants during her autopsy - while rejecting all other requests for further testing.

On October 7, 2024, a judge granted Peterson's request for post-conviction discovery, allowing his defense team to access evidence held by the authorities which they claim was withheld at Peterson's trial.

On June 2, 2025, the appeals court denied the LAIP's 140-page petition for writ of habeas corpus, filed in April, which claimed exculpatory evidence had been destroyed or suppressed by the court that would have changed the jury's verdict.

== Burials and tributes ==
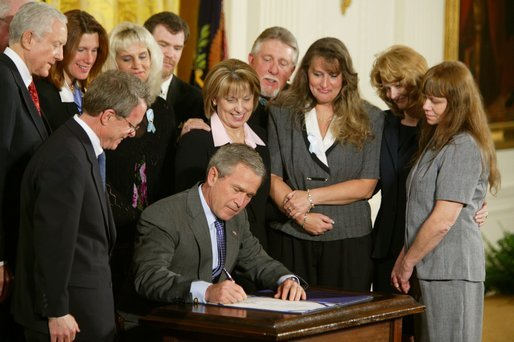
Unborn Victims of Violence Act Signing ceremony at the White House, April 1, 2004. Sharon Rocha is standing behind President George W. Bush and her long-term partner Ron Grantski is standing behind her with his hand on her shoulder.

Laci and Conner, her unborn son, were buried at Burwood Cemetery on August 30, 2003. The funeral cost Sharon Rocha and her long-term partner Ron Grantski $10,000, which a judge later ordered Scott to pay for. Their headstone omits the surname Peterson, per the request of Laci's mother and stepfather; thus, Laci is named under her maiden name of Rocha while Conner has no surname listed. The deaths of Laci and Conner Peterson led to the passage of the Unborn Victims of Violence Act, which is also known as Laci and Conner's Law. On April 1, 2004, Sharon Rocha and her long-term partner Ron Grantski were in attendance at the White House when President George W. Bush signed the bill into law. The Act provides that, under federal law, any person who causes death or injury to an unborn child during the commission of a crime upon a pregnant woman will be charged with a separate offense.

On October 21, 2005, Stanislaus County, California, Superior Court Judge Roger Beauchesne ruled that Scott was not entitled to collect on Laci's $250,000 life insurance policy, as he had been convicted of her murder. Under California state law, criminals may not profit from insurance policies. On December 19, 2005, the money was given to her mother, Sharon Rocha, as the executor of her estate. The California Fifth District Court of Appeals in Fresno later affirmed the trial court's decision on October 31, 2007. A $25 million wrongful death lawsuit was later filed against Scott Peterson by Laci's mother and stepfather but was dropped in April 2009.

In September 2006, former US congressman William E. Dannemeyer (R-CA) sent a letter to the California attorney general and other officials arguing that Laci had been killed by members of a Satanic cult, not by Scott.

In 2006, Sharon Rocha published For Laci: A Mother's Story of Love, Loss, and Justice, her biography and memoir about Laci's life and death. All proceeds are used to fund the Laci and Conner Search and Rescue Fund, which she had founded. On January 29, 2006, it was listed at No. 1 on The New York Times Non-Fiction Best Seller list.

Laci's stepfather, Ron Grantski, died in his sleep at his Modesto home on April 8, 2018, at age 71, following a lengthy period of failing health. He was buried next to Laci and Conner in Burwood Cemetery. Laci's father, Dennis Rocha, died December 9, 2018, at the age of 72. He was buried in Lakewood Memorial Park.

== Depiction in media ==
External videos
- Dateline Sneak Preview: The Laci Peterson Story: A Dateline Investigation

- In 2004, USA Network aired the television film The Perfect Husband: The Laci Peterson Story.
- In 2004, E! aired an episode of The E! True Hollywood Story on Laci Peterson.
- In 2005, the case was covered in the TV movie, Amber Frey: Witness for the Prosecution.
- In 2010, the Peterson case was the topic of the eponymous premiere episode of Investigation Discovery's True Crime with Aphrodite Jones.
- Although the case had been compared to the plot of Gillian Flynn's 2012 novel Gone Girl, Flynn refuted the notion her book was inspired by the Petersons, saying that although she saw parallels between the two, she made a point not to rely on any specific true account for her fiction. Rather, her portrayal of her characters as out-of-work writers was derived from her own experience being laid off from her job as a writer for Entertainment Weekly.
- In 2015, the series Murder Made Me Famous covered the story in its second episode, which premiered August 22. It re-aired in 2017 on the American cable channel Reelz as Scott Peterson: What Happened?
- In April 2017, Crime Junkie Podcast produced two episodes detailing Peterson's murder.
- On April 21, 2017, the NBC news magazine Dateline aired the two-hour special, The Laci Peterson Story: A Dateline Investigation.
- In May 2017, the Peterson case was the main focus of "Notorious: Scott Peterson", the Season 20 premiere of the Oxygen TV series Snapped.
- In June 2017, ABC aired a two-hour documentary on the case titled Truth and Lies: The Murder of Laci Peterson.
- In July 2017, HLN aired a two-hour program on the case titled How It Really Happened.
- In August 2017, the case was covered in A&E's six part series, The Murder of Laci Peterson.
- In November 2017, Investigation Discovery aired a two-hour documentary titled Scott Peterson: An American Murder Mystery.
- In December 2018, the case was discussed on the talk show Dr. Phil.
- In May 2021, the case was covered in the 48 Hours episode "Scott Peterson: Case in Question".
- In May 2021, the case was covered in the 20/20 episode "One Last Chance".
- In December of 2023 Kind of Strange Podcast did four episodes covering the case
- In August 2024, two documentary series focused on the case were released: the first American Murder: Laci Peterson for Netflix, with Laci's mother, Sharon Rocha, and Amber Frey interviewed; the second, Face to Face with Scott Peterson for Peacock, with Peterson giving his first interview in decades.

== See also ==
- List of solved missing person cases (2000s)
