= Jason Wilk =

American entrepreneur (born 1985)

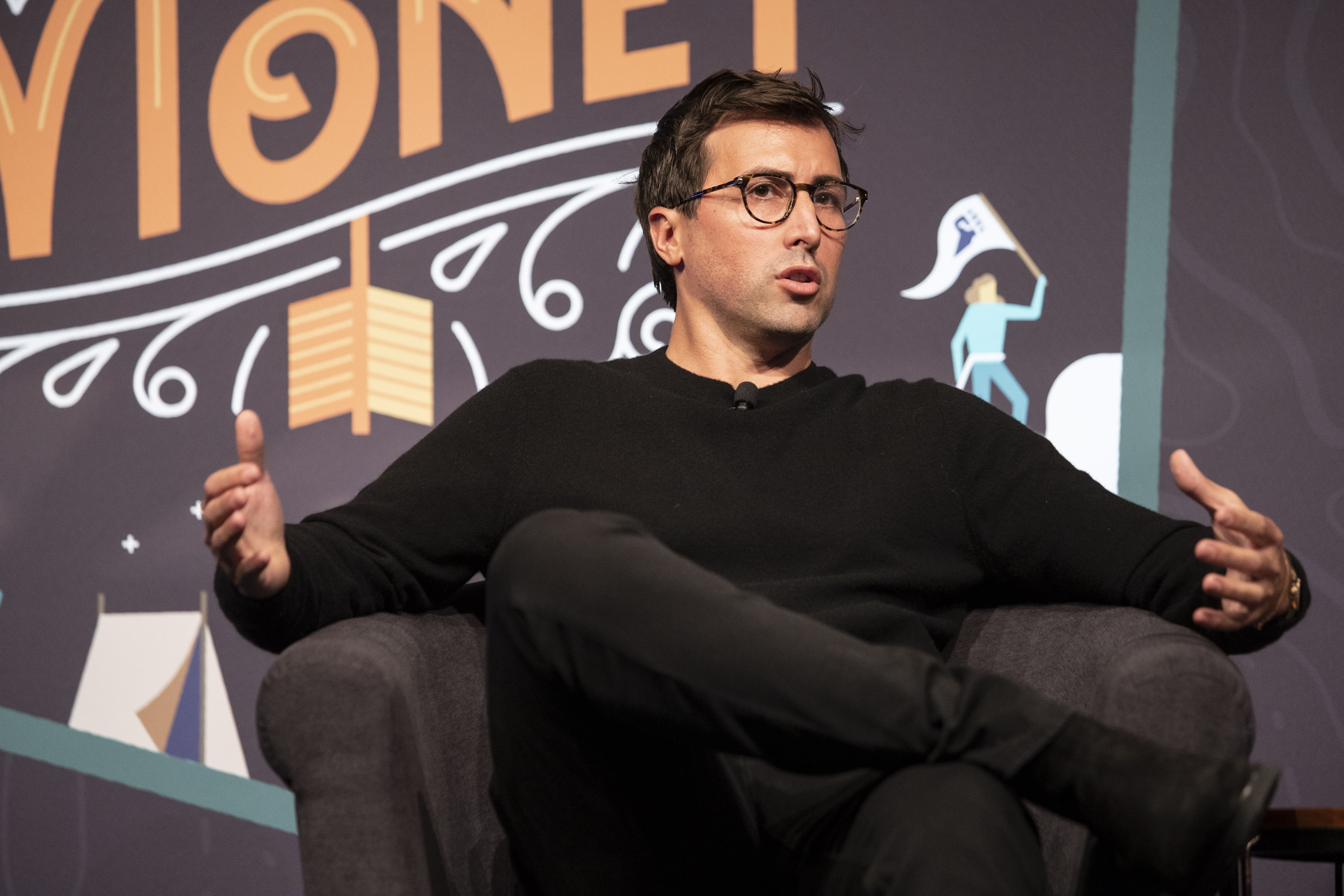
- Born: June 12, 1985 (age 41) (Note: 25 years old when the article was published in The New York Times in 2010); Los Angeles, California
- Occupation: Serial entrepreneur
- Known for: Founder of Dave

Jason Wilk is an American entrepreneur and the founder and CEO of Dave, a publicly traded financial services company on NASDAQ. He grew up in Los Angeles, California. Wilk created several small businesses before selling a video advertising network called AllScreen for $85 million in 2015. That gave him the money to start Dave, a digital banking upstart aimed at reducing the cost of banking and overdraft for everyday Americans. Over the years, Dave has grown to more than 10 million users and went public in January, 2022 at a valuation close to $4 billon. It is estimated that Wilk owns 20% of Dave.

== Early life ==
Wilk was born in Los Angeles, California, where he also spent his youth. He attended Loyola Marymount University in California, where he played golf. Initially, Wilk wanted to be a professional golfer, but at college decided to pursue entrepreneurship instead. He graduated from Loyola Maymount in 2007.

== Career ==
=== Early career ===
Wilk's first business venture was a retail website for golf equipment called 1DaySports.com. He sold the website for $100,000 (Note: A weaker source says $110,000) and used the money for a backpacking trip across several continents. Wilk also founded a startup called AllScreen. It was funded by Y Combinator. AllScreen was a video distribution network for media companies to easily share their content and ad revenue with other websites to achieve more views . (Note: CNBC has conflicting descriptions of the business, but this appears to be the correct one.) The company was also backed by celebrity venture capitalist Mark Cuban. Mr. Cuban invested in several of Wilk's ventures and had a big impact on Wilk's career after they met at the TechCrunch 40 conference around 2010. While AllScreen was still in stealth mode, he cofounded a company called WriteyBoard that sold stick-in whiteboards to startup companies. AllScreen sold to Zealot Networks in 2015 for $85 million.

=== Dave ===
Wilk founded digital banking upstart, Dave in 2016. (Note: 2017 according to a weaker source) The startup was inspired by Wilk's prior frustration with overdraft fees. According to Wilk, he had more than 120 meetings with venture capitalists, attempting to get financial support for Dave from investors that do not themselves experience overdraft fees. Dave grew to 10 million members within 5 years and $122 million in annual revenues by 2020, using subscriptions and optional tips as its business model, instead of overdraft fees. Wilk is largely credited with the disruption of overdraft fees in American banking. In 2022, Wilk was asked to give a Congressional testimony in front of the Senate Banking Subcommittee for Financial Institutions and Consumer Protection on the topic of “Examining Overdraft Fees and Their Effects on Working Families”. In 2021, Dave was ranked the fifth fastest growing company in America on the Inc5000 list. In January 2022, Wilk took the company public on NASDAQ at a valuation of close to $4 billion. According to CNBC, Dave was the best performing financial stock in 2024.

In an August 2025 interview with Sherwood News, Wilk attributed Dave's turnaround, from a nearly 98% share price decline to one of the top-performing stocks in the Russell 2000 in 2024, to improved margins and a renewed focus on profitability.

=== Recognition ===
Wilk was included in Worth magazine's "Worthy 100" list of entrepreneurs in 2021, recognized for founding Dave with the aim of protecting everyday customers from overdraft fees.
