= Rick Distaso =

American lawyer and judge

Judge of the Stanislaus County Superior Court
- Incumbent
- Assumed office 2005
- Appointed by: Arnold Schwarzenegger
- Preceded by: Wray F. Ladine

Personal details
- Born: Joseph Richard Distaso; January 25, 1967 (age 59) Los Angeles County, California
- Party: Republican
- Education: University of Southern California (BA); Loyola Marymount University (JD)

Military service
- Branch/service: United States Army
- Years of service: 1992-Present
- Rank: Lieutenant Colonel
- Unit: Army Judge Advocate General's Corps; 75th Legal Operations Detachment

Joseph Richard "Rick" Distaso (born January 25, 1967, in Los Angeles County, California) is an American lawyer and judge.

He was the Stanislaus County, California, senior deputy district attorney who served as the lead prosecutor in the case against Scott Peterson, charged with and later convicted of murdering his wife Laci Peterson and their unborn child Conner Peterson in 2002. Laci was eight months pregnant with Conner at the time of the murder.

Distaso attended University of Southern California as an undergraduate, and attended Loyola Law School for his law education. He was admitted to the California State Bar in 1992. After graduation from law school, he was a lawyer for the Judge Advocate General's Corps, United States Army through 1996, with the rank of captain, and then joined the Stanislaus County district attorney's office.

In 2005, Distaso was appointed a Stanislaus County Superior Court judge by California governor Arnold Schwarzenegger.

Distaso was deployed to Afghanistan for a tour in the Army Reserves. In 2008, he was deployed to Afghanistan where he served as a Lieutenant Colonel and Deputy Commander of the 75th Legal Operations Detachment in the U.S. Army Reserves JAG Corps.

As of December 2019, he is a judge for the Army's 4th Judicial Circuit.
