= Gordon Naccarato =

American chef and restaurateur

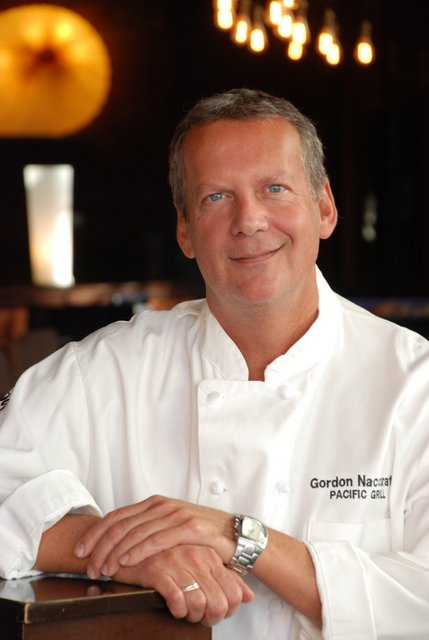
- Gordon Naccarato in 2008
- Born: 1954 (age 70–71); Tacoma, Washington
- Education: Stadium High School, University of Washington, Loyola Law School
- Culinary career
- Previous restaurant(s): Michael's (Santa Monica), 1979–c. 1984; Gordon's Restaurant (Aspen), 1984–c. 1990; Campanile (LA); Monkey Bar (LA); Le Colonial (LA), c. 1999; Beach House (Purdy), 2002–c. 2005; Smoke + Cedar (Tacoma), 2014–2015; Classics Cafe at LeMay - America's Car Museum (Tacoma), 2012–2020; Hot Shop Cafe at Museum of Glass (Tacoma), 2020–2020; Pacific Grill (Tacoma), 2005–2020
- Award(s) won: Food and Wine Best New Chef, 1988; Aspen Magazine Pantheon, 2014
- Website: www.pacificgrilltacoma.com

Gordon Naccarato (born 1954) is a chef and restaurateur from Tacoma, Washington.

== Education and early life ==
Naccarato was born in Tacoma, and grew up in the Tacoma area. He is the son of Stan Naccarato, a vice-president of the Tacoma Stars soccer team, and a restaurant owner.

He graduated from Stadium High School in 1972, and then attended the University of Washington. He met his wife Rebecca, also from Washington, while living in Washington. After UW, he attended Loyola Law School at Loyola Marymount University for two years, then dropped out in 1977.

== Restaurant career ==
Naccarato started his restaurateur career as a chef working for Michael's in Santa Monica in 1979. While there, he received Food & Wine Best New Chef award in 1988.

Gordon Naccarato and his wife Rebecca opened Gordon's Restaurant and Rebecca's Bakery in Aspen, Colorado in 1984.

Naccarato and his wife were granted a divorce, with Rebecca employed at a grill in Kirkland and later opening a Seattle restaurant with brother Tim Towner in 1990.

Gordon moved back to Tacoma in July 2001 after working under Mark Peel of Campanile and in other Los Angeles restaurants, including Monkey Bar and Le Colonial, in the 1990s. He started the Beach House restaurant in Purdy in 2002.

In Tacoma, Naccarato is president of Naccarato Restaurant Group, which operates Pacific Grill. He opened Smoke + Cedar restaurant in 2014. The Classics Cafe at America's Car Museum is owned by Naccarato. His brother Steve opened Shake Shake Shake in Tacoma.

In September 2020, Naccarato announced the closure of the Naccarato Restaurant Group, permanently closing Pacific Grill restaurant and Pacific Grill Events & Catering, due to the ongoing effects of the COVID-19 pandemic on business.

== Awards and recognition ==
In addition to the Best New Chef 1988 award noted above, Naccarato was named by Aspen Magazine in 2014 as one of 40 individuals creating modern Aspen, a former "culinary wasteland".

Other chefs have noted the influence Naccarato had on their expression.

== Personal life ==
Naccarato was profiled as a prominent openly gay businessperson by The Advocate in 2013.
