= Ed Howard (lawyer) =

American lawyer (born 1963)

- Born: Edward Paxson Howard IV; September 21, 1963 (age 62); Los Angeles, California, United States
- Education: George Washington University; Loyola Law School
- Occupations: Senior Counsel for Children's Advocacy Institute, Senior Counsel for Center for Public Interest Law, Principal and Founder of Howard Advocacy
- Years active: 1991-present
- Organization(s): Children's Advocacy Institute, Center for Public Interest Law

Ed Howard (born September 21, 1963) is an American public interest lawyer and strategist who currently works as senior counsel for the Children's Advocacy Institute and the Center for Public Interest Law based at the University of San Diego School of Law. He is currently the president of Howard Advocacy in Sacramento, California.

== Early life and education ==
Edward Paxson Howard IV was born in Santa Monica, California and raised in Los Angeles. He graduated from Taft High School in 1981. Howard received his B.A in Political Science from George Washington University in 1986. At George Washington University, Howard was editor-in-chief of the yearbook, Cherry Tree, state chairman of College Democrats for Washington DC, editorials editor for the George Washington University student newspaper The Hatchet, and editor-in-chief of the George Washington University arts and literary magazine Wooden Teeth. He served as the Vice President of the George Washington University College Democrats and as a student senator, where he chaired the Senate Finance Committee. He also founded Political Awareness Week at George Washington University. He received various awards and honors while in college, including the Excellence in Student Life Award, the Outstanding Service to George Washington University award, and was selected for the Omicron Delta Kappa National Leadership Honor Society. Howard received his J.D. from Loyola Law School in 1990, where he was awarded the American Jurisprudence Award for Constitutional Law. He served as Chief Justice of the Moot Court during his time at Loyola Law School. Teddy was also a member of the Village Idiots during Jr High. The rest of the idiots were Glen, David and Greg.

== Legal career ==
=== 1991–1995 ===
During law school at Loyola Law School, Howard interned as a law clerk for the Los Angeles County District Attorney's Office, where he conducted approximately fifty preliminary hearings before the Los Angeles County Municipal Court. He then became an Associate of the downtown Los Angeles office of Paul, Hastings, Janofsky & Walker (now Paul Hastings LLP), where he worked on First Amendment and insurance coverage issues, including representing the rap group N.W.A.

Howard's career in public interest law began in 1991 when he became an associate for the former Westwood office of Hall & Phillips, later Hall & Associates. Howard's achievements while at Hall & Associates included serving as the lead counsel on behalf of consumer groups in two California Supreme Court cases of first impression: Amwest v. Wilson (fully implementing Proposition 103, a 1988 insurance reform measure) and 20th Century Garamendi (1994) (unanimously affirming lawfulness of Garamendi's complex premium rebate regulations resulting in over $1 billion in refunds ). Howard's other work while at the firm includes fighting for various environmental issues and sex equity in education. While at Hall & Associates, Howard also served on the Drafting Committees for Proposition 186, an initiative that proposed to establish a state single-payer health care program. Though defeated, the initiative modeled the program's feasibility and was the largest grassroots political campaign fundraising effort in California history.

=== 1995–1999 ===
From 1995 to 1998, Howard served as the executive director and lead staff attorney for the now-dissolved Center for Law in the Public Interest. While there, he worked on such cases as: Gregorio T. v. Wilson (1994) (successfully challenging anti-immigrant Proposition 187, lead on administrative and initiative law issues); Wenger v. Trans Union (1995) (landmark challenge to credit reporting agency practices); Carmen Doe v. Wilson (1997) (challenging former Governor Pete Wilson's effort to end prenatal care to undocumented women at Christmas time); California Women's Law Center v. State Board of Education (1995) (successfully overturning Board of Education regulations on sexual harassment, leading to the enactment of new regulation); and Proposition 103 Enforcement Project v. Quackenbush (1998) (successfully invalidating amendment to Proposition 103). Also, while at the Center for Law in the Public Interest, Howard wrote and spearheaded enactment of AB 156 (Murray), a sweeping reform of credit bureau practices that brought the issue of identity theft to the attention of the nation. Facets of the legislation have been copied in over ten states. He also co-wrote AB 50 with the California Bankers Association in 1998, the nation's first bill to regulate biometric identification, by making illegal the sale of voice, fingerprint and retina databases to third parties. It also prohibited the use of such information in discriminatory practices. His experience as a lead counsel for California Supreme Court and appellate cases in initiative matters led the 15th Dean of Loyola Law School to ask Howard to serve as the adjunct professor of law from 1994 to 1998, where he created and taught California's first class devoted to Initiative Law. During his time at the Center for Law in the Public Interest (CLIPI), Howard served as an adviser on auto insurance, health care reform and personal privacy issues for former 1998 gubernatorial candidate Al Checchi.

"In art you can only alter a facsimile of reality. In policy, or law, you can be directly creative and alter the way people live their lives. You can change the world you live in."

— Ed Howard,

Howard worked as the senior counsel for the Foundation for Taxpayer and Consumer Rights from 1999 to 2000, where he helped engineer the nation's first major class-action managed care reform lawsuits: a nationwide RICO class action against Aetna-U.S Healthcare and a statewide California class action against Kaiser Permanente for false advertising. In 1999 Howard became a partner at Kornarens and Howard, a litigation firm specializing in consumer rights, land use, health care, copyright and trademark litigation, civil rights, writ, law and motion, and appellate practice.

=== 2000–2005 ===
While at Kornarens and Howard, Howard drafted an initiative that helped victims of identity theft.

He also represented the Bolsa Chica Land Trust before the California Coastal Commission, responsible for crafting the legal theories, grassroots advocacy, and submissions that lead to the Commission in 2000 unanimously preserving not just ribbons of land around wetlands but large tracts of adjacent land. The Commission was subsequently sued by Signal Landmark and Hearthside Homes, Inc. and Howard represented the Land Trust in that case, which turned aside the developer's challenge.

In 2000, Howard became the Chief Policy Consultant & Special Counsel to State Senator Liz Figueroa. Ed had wide-ranging duties that included speech writing and developing, drafting, lobbying, and negotiating the Senator's legislative agenda, especially in the areas of health care, health insurance, property-casualty insurance, labor, Workers’ Compensation, consumer rights, and privacy. He drafted and staffed AB 32 (2000) (a bill jointly authored with Republican Assembly member Keith Richman to reform and expand Medi-Cal and Healthy Families and insure thousands more California children), SB 771 (2001) (establishing a state-maintained "Do Not Call" list that bars telemarketers from calling anyone on the list; jointly authored by Republican Assembly member John Campbell; now copied federally by the FTC); and SB 1950 (2002) (broad reform of Medical Board's doctor disciplinary practices).

In 2005, Howard became the Chief Consultant of Joint Committee on Boards, Commissions and Consumer Protection. As Chief Consultant, Howard spearheaded the investigation and review of all the state's boards and commissions. Howard successfully staffed SB 231 (Figueroa), a landmark reform of Medical Board operations. In the same year Howard was named the Chief Consultant of the Senate's Government Modernization, Efficiency & Accountability Committee. Howard's duties included working on bill analyses and legislative reform proposals. Howard's staff work include SB 577 (2005) (reforming government finance regulation); SB 796 (2005) (requiring Internet access to government information); and SB 954 (reforming information technology procurement).

=== 2006–present ===
In January 2007, Howard became senior counsel for the Children's Advocacy Institute based in the University of San Diego School of Law. In 2007 Howard oversaw the Children's Advocacy Institute's and Morrison & Foerster's precedent-setting federal lawsuit on behalf of foster parent advocacy groups (California State Foster Care Association, California State Care Providers Association, and Legal Advocates for Permanent Parenting). The purpose of the suit was to seek more money for parents caring for abused and neglected foster children. After three and a half years of litigation, in 2011, the US District Court in San Francisco ordered the California Department of Social Services (CDSS) to "immediately" implement new, higher reimbursement rates for California foster parents. While at the Children's Advocacy Institute, Howard has worked on enacting a statute increasing transparency of foster care operations and numerous laws aiding homeless and foster youth. Among these laws is SB 39 (2007) which allows the press and public greater access to county documents when children under the supervision of CPS die. This law has prompted broad press coverage of the operational shortcomings in county child welfare services, especially in Los Angeles and Sacramento Counties.

Howard was part of the legal team that persuaded a judge to strike down regulations promulgated by the State Department of Social Services pursuant to SB 39 that had previously blocked information from being released to the press and public when local child welfare agencies had failed to act to prevent a child from being fatally abused or neglected. Other laws Howard has worked on through the Children's Advocacy Institute include the law that permits more than two parents to be legally recognized as parents and AB 2632 (Maienschein) (2014) that requires criminal record clearances in community care facilities.

When our government uses its blunt power to come into a home and remove children from their parents, you and I assume a terrific moral and spiritual responsibility to do right by these children; a responsibility to do better than the parents we took them from.

— Ed Howard,

In 2007 Howard also became the Senior Counsel for the Center for Public Interest Law, a nonprofit, nonpartisan academic and advocacy organization also based in the University of San Diego School of Law that studies occupational licensing and monitors California agencies that regulate businesses, trades, and professions. Howard's work with the Center for Public Interest Law includes enactment of reforms dealing with the accountancy profession, reform of the regulation of for-profit postsecondary education businesses, SB 658 (2011) (the nation's first law regulating funeral website pricing), and reforming the State Bar of California. Howard was responsible for the press stories exposing that former UC Davis Chancellor Linda Katehi had accepted a post on Devry University's board of directors.

Ed's legislative work establishing pricing transparency in the funeral home industry was profiled in a national NPR story. He and the work of his colleagues at the Center for Public Interest Law were recently featured in the University of San Diego Law School magazine. Ed was also an advocate for securing millions in public funds to reduce the case loads of attorneys representing foster children. He also successfully sought reformation of how the State Bar oversees lawyers.

Ed was asked by the National Center for Lesbian Rights to offer advice on strategies to defeat Proposition 8 banning gay marriage in Strauss v. Horton (2009) 46 Cal.4th 364 and to file an amicus curiae brief. Ed again worked with the center on behalf of the Children's Advocacy Institute to enact legislation permitting a judge to find more than two adults satisfy the legal test for being a parent if in the child's best interests.

== Notable Howard Advocacy clients ==
- American Electronics Association
- Deposition Reporters Association of California
- Earthjustice (defeating an end-of-session legislative gambit by Chevron)
- American Environmental Safety Institute based in Palo Alto, Columbia
- Columbia Forest Products (a green building company) in a regulatory effort before the Air Resources Board to regulate formaldehyde in composite word products, an effort that has inspired federal regulations
- Propel Industries (green fuel company)
- Pride Industries (nation's largest job placement non-profit for the disabled)
- California Clean Money Action Fund
- UFCW
- SEIU-UHW
- Working Partnerships USA
- Center for Public Interest Law
- Common Cause
- Children's Advocacy Institute
- CAPA
