= Eddie Howard (American football) =

American football player (born 1972)

No. 2
- Position: Punter

Personal information
- Born: October 6, 1972 (age 54); Covina, California, U.S.
- Listed height: 6 ft 1 in (1.85 m)
- Listed weight: 203 lb (92 kg)

Career information
- High school: West Covina (CA)
- College: Idaho

Career history
- Washington Redskins (1998)*; San Francisco 49ers (1998); Cincinnati Bengals (1999)*
- * Offseason or practice squad member only

Career statistics
- Games played: 2
- Punts: 9
- Punt yards: 324
- Touchbacks: 1
- Punts inside 20: 2
- Net yards: 295
- Stats at Pro Football Reference

Edward L. Howard (born October 6, 1972) is an American former professional football player who was a punter for one season with the San Francisco 49ers of the National Football League (NFL). He had 9 punts for 324 yards in 2 games. He was signed by the Washington Redskins as an undrafted free agent in 1998.
