= Quinton Aaron =

American actor (born 1984)

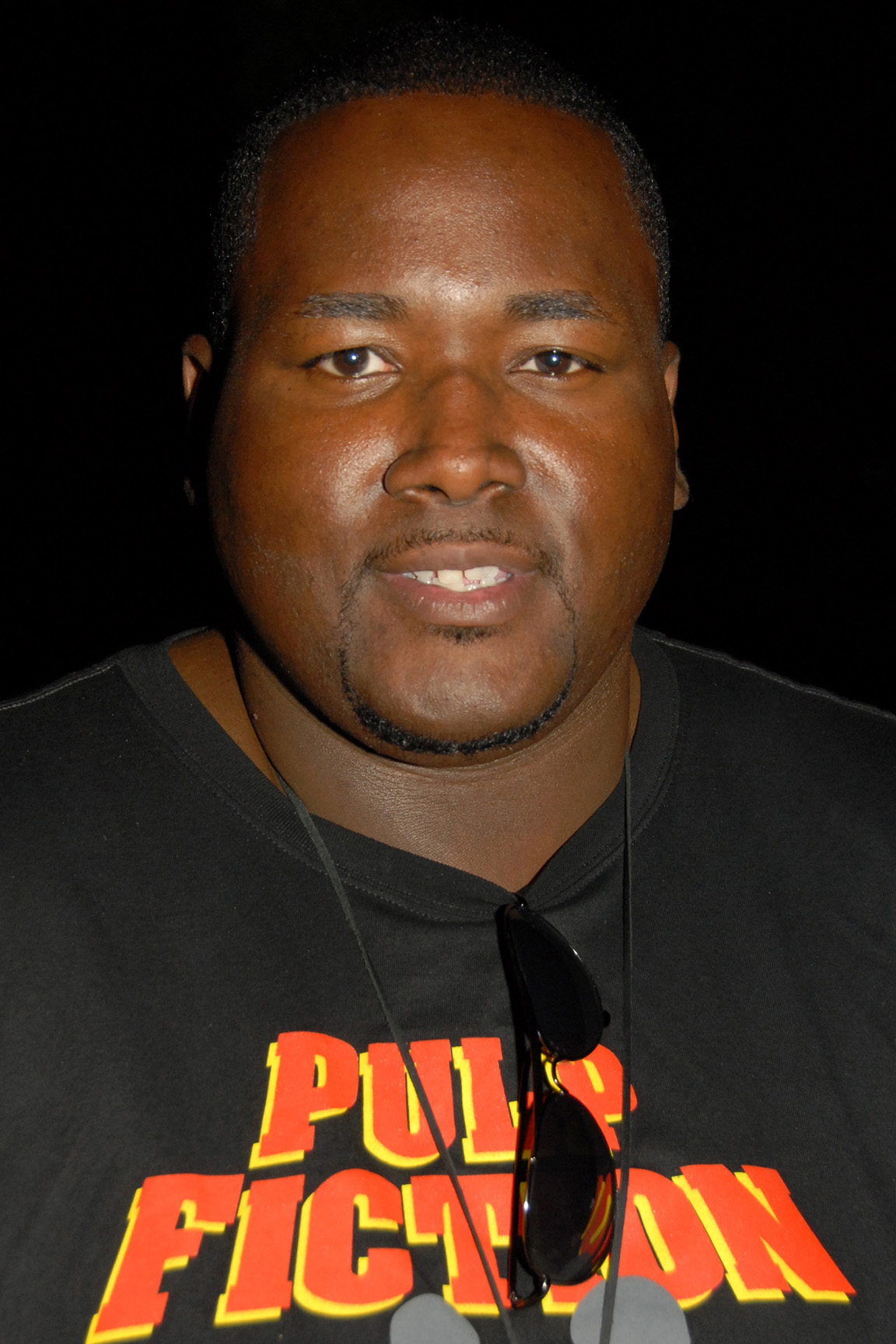
- Aaron in 2010
- Born: August 15, 1984 (age 42); The Bronx, New York, U.S.
- Occupation: Actor
- Years active: 2006–present
- Spouse: Margarita DeLeon
- Website: www.quintonaaron.org

Quinton Aaron (born August 15, 1984) is an American actor. He made his film debut in Michel Gondry's Be Kind Rewind. He is best known for his lead role as Michael Oher in the 2009 film The Blind Side.

== Career ==
Aaron made his film debut as Q in Michel Gondry's Be Kind Rewind, starring Mos Def and Jack Black. He co-starred in an NYU thesis short film called Mr. Brooklyn with Al Thompson (Liberty Kid, A Walk to Remember), directed by Jason Sokoloff.

Aaron has appeared in two episodes of the TV show Law & Order (Season 17, episode "Bling" as a bodyguard and episode "Fallout" as a bouncer and one episode of Law & Order: Special Victims Unit s11e17 "Disabled").

His first lead role was playing Michael Oher, alongside Sandra Bullock and Tim McGraw in The Blind Side, released November 20, 2009. Directed by John Lee Hancock, the film was adapted from Michael Lewis's 2006 book The Blind Side: Evolution of a Game, which features Oher's real-life story. Oher had started in ten games as a guard during his first season with the Ole Miss Rebels, becoming a first-team freshman All-American, and later an American football offensive tackle for the Baltimore Ravens. Aaron auditioned for the role after his mother found out about the casting call online. Chosen as a finalist, he was flown in to Los Angeles for the final audition. Unsure whether he had been successful, he reached into his pocket on his way to the door and pulled out a card, telling Hancock that he knew that it was a long shot for him to get the part, but that he did security work and would love to provide those services should they be needed for the film. Hancock said that he would keep it in mind.

On March 25, 2010, Aaron guest-starred with Jill Scott in an episode of Law & Order: Special Victims Unit. On April 28, 2010, Quinton guest-starred in the "We All Saw This Coming" episode of Mercy. On April 4, 2011, Quinton guest-starred in the season finale of Harry's Law with his Blind Side co-star Kathy Bates.

During the 2010 Major League Baseball All-Star Game, Aaron participated in the Taco Bell Legends and Celebrities Softball Game as a victorious American Leaguer.

In 2015, Aaron shot the film Busy Day in Albuquerque, New Mexico.

In 2023, Aaron released his first single "Lead with Love".

== Personal life ==
Aaron was born in The Bronx, New York City, on August 15, 1984. He moved to Augusta, Georgia, after finishing elementary school.

On January 23, 2026, Aaron collapsed at his home and was hospitalized in Atlanta, Georgia. He was treated for a severe blood infection and was placed on life support. Nearly a week later, Aaron experienced a spinal cord stroke.

Aaron has been married to Margarita DeLeon since 2024, not realizing that she was still legally married to Eric Guzman.

== Filmography ==
=== Film ===
Year	Title	Role	Notes
2006	Feliz Navidad	Vocalist	Uncredited
2007	I Hate Black People	Bar Patron	Short Film
2008	Be Kind Rewind	Q	
2009	Mr. Brooklyn	Jefferson	Short Film
2009	The Ministers	Perp	Uncredited
2009	The Blind Side	Michael Oher	
2009	Cred		Short Film
2012	Rebel	Qutub	Short Film
2013	Paranormal Movie	Quinton	
2013	1982	Turtle	
2013	Nameless	Driver	Short Film
2014	The Appearing	Kenneth	
2014	Left Behind	Simon	
2015	My Favorite Five	T.I.	
2015	Dancer and the Dame	Louis	
2015	My First Miracle	Brandon	
2016	Halfway	Byron	
2016	Mothers and Daughters	Dr. Hamilton	
2016	Traded	Silas	
2016	Greater	Coach Aaron	
2016	Extraction: Genesis	Blade	
2016	Hero of the Underworld	Tino	
2017	It's Not My Fault and I Don't Care Anyway	Brian Calhoun	
2017	Justice	Benjamin	
2017	Busy Day	Ivan	
2017	The Hammer	K-Rod	
2017	An American in Texas	Quain	
2017	Rock, Paper, Scissors	Joe	
2017	Jason's Letter	Troy James Sr.	
2018	The Second Coming of Christ	Michael	
2018	Worthless	Principal Banks	
2018	Fishbowl California	Rad Chad	
2018	Bad Company	Damen	
2018	The Debt	Zo	Short Film
2019	Dad	Trevor	Short Film
2019	Aurora's Law	Dave	
2019	Elfette Saves Christmas	Santa Claus	
2019	Who Stole the Tasmanian Devils	Lt. Fran	
2021	Mummy Dearest	Quinton Jonesboro	
2021	Summertime Dropouts	Lorenzo	
2021	Money Is King	Professor Edward Randolph	
2022	Hybristophilia	Tommy	
2022	The Baby Pact	Joe Jr.	
2026	Stairway To The Stars	Tony	Short Film

=== Television ===
Year	Title	Role	Notes
2007	Law & Order	Bouncer / Bodyguard	2 episodes; uncredited
2008	Play or Be Played	Bodyguard	Direct-to-TV film
2010	Law & Order: Special Victims Unit	Damien Woods	Episode: "Disabled"
2010	Mercy		Episode: "We All Saw This Coming"
2011	One Tree Hill	Tommy	2 episodes
2011	Harry's Law	Brian Jones	Episode: "Last Dance"
2011	Drop Dead Diva	Jacob Campbell	Episode: "Bride-a-Palooza"
2017	Let's Fall Out	Tank	Episode: "The Vault Association"
2018	The Fallen	Solomon Jones	
2018–2020	Gods of Medicine	Vick Wilson	7 episodes
2020	Unsubscribe	Sammy	Episode: "Pilot"
2020	Locked in Love	Damien Silver	Episode: "Chapter 1"

=== Music videos ===
Year	Title	Role	Artist	Notes
2012	"Justine"	Self	Julia Stone	
