= Jaime Lee Kirchner =

American actress, dancer and singer (born 1981)

- Born: Jaime Lee Kirchner; August 23, 1981 (age 45); Nuremberg, Germany
- Occupation: Actress
- Years active: 2005–present
- Spouse: Benjamin Emanuel Kaplan (m. 2012; div. 2014)

Jaime Lee Kirchner (born August 23, 1981) is an American actress, dancer and singer, known for her roles on television. She is best known for the role of Danny James in Bull.

== Life and career ==
Kirchner was born in Nuremberg, Germany but was raised in Clarksville, Tennessee. She attended New York University's Tisch School of the Arts in New York. She made her stage debut in the role of Mimi Marquez in the international and Broadway productions of musical Rent in 2005. Before acting, she appeared as a dancer in Beyoncé's "Work It Out" music video.

Kirchner is best known for her performances on television. She starred opposite Don Johnson in The WB comedy-drama, Just Legal in 2005. She later starred as one of leads alongside Taylor Schilling and Michelle Trachtenberg in the NBC medical drama Mercy from 2009 to 2010. She also guest-starred on Rescue Me, CSI: Crime Scene Investigation, and Dollhouse, and had a recurring role in the USA Network comedy-drama, Necessary Roughness. In 2012, Kirchner was regular cast member of Fox series, The Mob Doctor.

In 2014, Kirchner was cast in the ABC primetime soap opera, Members Only created by Susannah Grant, but the series never aired. In 2016, she was cast in the role of Investigator Danny James on the CBS legal drama Bull. She stayed in the role until the show's conclusion in 2022.

== Filmography ==
Year	Title	Role	Notes
2005	Carlito's Way: Rise to Power	Female Club Goer	Direct-to-video
2005	Rescue Me	Molly	Episode: "Shame"
2005	Just Legal	Dulcinea "Dee" Real	Main role, 7 episodes
2006	Enemies	Stephanie	Unsold TV pilot
2006	CSI: Crime Scene Investigation	Angie	Episode: "Up in Smoke"
2008	Definitely, Maybe	Samantha	Film; uncredited
2008	Austin Golden Hour	London	Unsold TV pilot
2009	Dollhouse	Rayna Russell	Episode: "Stage Fright"
2009–2010	Mercy	Nurse Sonia Jimenez	Main role, 22 episodes
2011	I Hate That I Love You	Missy	Unsold TV pilot
2011	Necessary Roughness	Vivica Stevens	Recurring role, 3 episodes
2012–2013	The Mob Doctor	Dr. Olivia Watson	Main role, 13 episodes
2015	Members Only	Diana	Canceled before airing
2016–2022	Bull	Danny James	Main role
