= Not Another Not Another Movie =

2011 film

- Directed by: David Murphy
- Written by: David Leo Schultz; David Murphy; James Piper; Greg Wilson
- Produced by: Zach Cole; David Murphy; James Piper; David Leo Schultz
- Starring: David Leo Schultz; Vinnie Jones; Michael Madsen; Ellie Gerber; Chevy Chase; Burt Reynolds
- Cinematography: Scott Peck
- Edited by: Jeff Murphy
- Music by: Jason Rabinowitz
- Distributed by: Gravitas Ventures
- Release date: September 1, 2011
- Running time: 99 minutes
- Country: United States
- Language: English

Not Another Not Another Movie is a 2011 American direct-to-video comedy film starring David Leo Schultz, Vinnie Jones, Michael Madsen, Ellie Gerber and featuring Chevy Chase and Burt Reynolds.

== Cast ==
- David Leo Schultz as Randy
- Vinnie Jones as Nancy Longbottom
- Michael Madsen as Lester Storm
- Ellie Gerber as Wendy
- Chevy Chase as Max Storm
- Burt Reynolds as C.J. Waters
- Richard Tyson as Himself
- Wolfgang Bodison as Himself
- James Duval as Himself
- Louis Mandylor as NASA Guy
- John Melendez as NASA Official

== Reception ==
Film critic Nathan Rabin heavily panned the film, comparing it to other movies of the parody genre (particularly those by Jason Friedberg and Aaron Seltzer, whom he described as "comic terrorists who cavalierly destroy what others create for their own ugly self-interest") and calling Schultz "intensely non-charismatic", and concluding: "Worst of all, this overlong sketch of a movie lasts an interminable 99 minutes. If any film merits being a mere 70 minutes, it’s this abomination. Hell, it merits even less than that: It never should have been made in the first place, and now lingers as an enduring embarrassment in a rancid subgenre seemingly devoid of shame. Just how bad is it? It’s beyond dreadful. It’s sub-Seltzer-Friedberg, if that’s even possible."
