= Wolfgang Bodison =

American actor (born 1966)

- Born: November 19, 1966 (age 60); Washington, D.C., U.S.
- Education: University of Virginia (BFA)
- Occupation: Actor
- Years active: 1991–present

Brian Wolfgang Bodison (born November 19, 1966) is an American actor and creative director best known for playing Lance Corporal Harold W. Dawson in the 1992 drama film A Few Good Men.

== Early life ==
Brian Wolfgang Bodison who is of African American heritage, was born on November 19, 1966, in Washington, D.C. His mother, Dorothea Bodison, worked for the National Institutes of Health. His father died in a car accident when he was a child.

In 1988, he graduated from the University of Virginia in Charlottesville, Virginia, where he played football, as a team member of the Virginia Cavaliers, and earned a degree in fine arts.

== Career ==
=== Life before acting ===
After his graduation, Bodison was hired as a file clerk at Columbia Pictures. From there, he was hired for a job in 1989 at the mail room at Castle Rock Entertainment.

Rob Reiner made Bodison his personal assistant on the set of Misery (1990). At the time, Bodison had an aspiration on becoming a screenwriter and film director and would take notes on Reiner's direction.

Bodison was also credited as being the picture-car coordinator for John Singleton's film, Boyz n the Hood (1991). "My job was to go into South Central and get some of the car clubs interested in the movie," Bodison said.

=== A Few Good Men ===
At first, Reiner made Bodison his location manager for A Few Good Men (1992). However, Reiner had trouble casting for the role of Lance Cpl. Harold Dawson, a young Marine on trial for the murder of a private.

"We were talking, and he said, 'Wolf, have you ever acted?'" Bodison said. "I said, 'No, man.' He said, 'Ever thought about it?' 'No.' He said, 'Well, I'm trying to cast the movie, and I haven't found anyone for Dawson who fits my vision. Why don't you read for it?'" Since Bodison had never acted before, he hired Julie Ariola, an acting coach. "He's a very creative kid and very intelligent," Ariola said. "He was like a sponge. He took every suggestion."

In August 1991, shortly after Bodison's audition, he was called back to read again. Three days later: "I stopped at a pay phone, called Rob, and he said, 'Wolf, welcome to the movie business.'" Bodison said. "Man, I damn near dropped the phone. Then I went home and sat down in front of my window. I thought, 'What in the hell is going on?'"

"I wasn't the least bit surprised he got the job," said Ariola on Bodison getting what became his most well known role. "Destiny. That's what it was."

On her review of the film, The Washington Post film critic Rita Kempley described Bodison as an "impressive non-actor". On his review, Hartford Courant film critic Malcolm Johnson described him as "fierce" and "devoted". Writing for the Los Angeles Times, David Gritten wrote that Bodison "played it from the heart and gut. I've never seen anyone express contempt with just one look the way he does. He was enormously good at conveying complicated emotions without a word. You knew exactly how he felt." Film critic Vincent Canby of The New York Times wrote, "Mr. Bodison, a new young actor whose performance as the more prominent defendant gives the film its melancholy shock value."

=== Later career ===
Other films Bodison appeared in include Little Big League (1994), The Expert (1995), Freeway (1996), Goodbye America (1997), Most Wanted (1997), Joe Somebody (2001), Akeelah and the Bee (2006) and Legacy (2010). Television credits include recurring roles on Nothing Sacred and Family Law, as well as guest-star appearances on hit shows such as Highlander: The Series, CSI: NY, CSI: Miami, NCIS, Cane, ER, and Perception.

Bodison's aspiration to become a screenwriter and director came true by writing and directing the short films, Simone, Broken, Sarah's Wish, and The Long Wait, all of which have screened in major festivals worldwide. In the latter film he also starred, along with Elizabeth Yoder, with whom he first collaborated at Playhouse West in Los Angeles. "Working with Wolfgang was incredible," Yoder recalls. "He made the writing process easy. What we shared was an understanding of how devastating these unresolved emotions can be, especially through the lens of childhood. After my 24 year quest for solace, understanding and redemption, it's been enormously cathartic." Bodison and Yoder shared the Storytelling Achievement Award at the 2014 Laughlin International Film Festival. "It's a story of forgiveness," Bodison explains. "Winning the Storytelling Award means a lot because, as writer and director, my job is to tell a great story. This recognition is a huge personal achievement." Bodison also won the Best Director Award at the Playhouse West Film Festival as well as two additional awards for Best Actor and Best Short Film at the 2014 Beaufort International Film Festival.

In 2014, he appeared in the independent feature, Ragamuffin.

Bodison is the artistic director at the Los Angeles branch of the Playhouse West School and Repertory Theatre.

== Select filmography ==
Year	Title	Role	Notes
1992	A Few Good Men	Lance Corporal Harold Dawson, USMC	
1994	Little Big League	Spencer Hamilton	
1994	Criminal Passion	Jordan Monroe	
1995	The Expert	Don Mason	
1996	Freeway	Detective Mike Breer	
1997	Goodbye America	Jack Hamilton	
1997	Most Wanted	Captain Steve Braddock	
2001	Joe Somebody	Cade Raymond	
2006	Akeelah and the Bee	Akeelah's father	
2010	Legacy	Jim Burgess	
2011	Not Another Not Another Movie	Himself	
2014	The Appearing	Father Callahan	
2015	Caught	Coach	
