= The Mob Doctor =

2012 American drama television series

- Genre: Crime drama Medical drama
- Created by: Josh Berman; Rob Wright
- Based on: Il Dottore: The Double Life of a Mafia Doctor by Ron Felber
- Starring: Jordana Spiro; William Forsythe; James Carpinello; Zach Gilford; Željko Ivanek; Floriana Lima; Jaime Lee Kirchner; Wendy Makkena; Jesse Lee Soffer
- Composers: Scott Starrett; Danny Lux
- Country of origin: United States
- Original language: English
- No. of seasons: 1
- No. of episodes: 13

Production
- Executive producers: Josh Berman; Rob Wright; Michael Dinner
- Running time: 43 minutes
- Production companies: Sony Pictures Television; Osprey Productions; Rooney McP Productions

Original release
- Network: Fox
- Release: September 17, 2012 – January 7, 2013

The Mob Doctor is an American television drama that aired on Fox from September 17, 2012, to January 7, 2013, as a part of the 2012–13 network television season. The series was created by Josh Berman and Rob Wright and is based on the book Il Dottore: The Double Life of a Mafia Doctor by Ron Felber. Berman, Wright, Michael Dinner, and Carla Kettner served as executive producers.

On November 28, 2012, Fox cancelled the series after one season.

== Premise ==
The series follows Grace Devlin, a surgical resident, who juggles her hospital duties with protecting her brother from the mob. Grace works off her brother's debt by helping anyone they demand.

== Cast ==
=== Main ===
- Jordana Spiro as Grace Devlin; well-educated doctor and surgical resident who took on her brother's debt to the mob.
- William Forsythe as Constantine Alexander; returned Chicago Outfit boss and Grace's protector.
- James Carpinello as Franco Leoni; Constantine's enforcer and Grace's ex-boyfriend. Undercover FBI agent working to bring down the Chicago mob.
- Zach Gilford as Brett Robinson; Grace's boyfriend to whom she has to lie at times to protect her secrets.
- Željko Ivanek as Stafford White, Chief of Surgical Department; supervises Grace, favors her as a promising surgeon.
- Floriana Lima as Rosa "Ro" Quintero; nurse at the hospital and friend of Grace.
- Jaime Lee Kirchner as Olivia Watson; rival doctor working in the same surgical unit residency as Grace.
- Wendy Makkena as Daniella Devlin, mother of Grace and Nate; she has a history with Constantine.
- Jesse Lee Soffer as Nate Devlin, Grace's brother; owed a debt to mob boss Paul Moretti but his sister took it on for him. Works in Constantine's crew after Moretti is overthrown.

=== Recurring ===
- Michael Rapaport as Paul Moretti, former leader of the mob until Constantine takes over.
- David Pasquesi as Ian Fanagan, a senior colleague of Grace's, who Grace frequently disagrees with.
- Kevin J. O'Connor as Stavos Kazan, personal attorney to and consigliere of Constantine's mob family.
- Adam J. Harrington as Owen York, an FBI agent investigating Constantine.
- Shohreh Aghdashloo as Jayana Baylor, a senior doctor at the hospital.
- Kevin Corrigan as Titus Amato, an acquaintance of Constantine and new business partner in the poker machine business.
- Terry Kinney as Donte Amato, brother of Titus, friend of Constantine, and knew Grace's father.
- Jennifer Beals as Celeste LaPree, a madam standing as a proxy for a mob boss in Constantine's underground circle.
- Mike Starr as Al Trapani, a member of Constantine's underground circle.
- Michael Madsen as Russell King, an associate of one of Constantine's former rivals, who attempted to take over Downtown Chicago, before being out-muscled by Constantine.

== Production ==
On May 9, 2012, Fox placed a series order for the drama for the 2012–13 television season.

In production, a working title for the show was Dirty Medicine.

== Episodes ==
No.	Title	Directed by	Written by	Original release date	Prod. code	U.S. viewers (millions)
1	"Pilot"	Michael Dinner	Teleplay by : and Television Story by: Josh Berman & Rob Wright	September 17, 2012	101	5.11
Grace Devlin is a surgeon who made a deal with Paul Moretti (Michael Rapaport) to save her brother. She agreed to pay off her brother's debt, work it off, or do whatever she was asked to do to save her brother's life, but she did not realize the deal could include murder until Moretti orders her to kill a man in witness protection who requires surgery. With Moretti angrily pursuing her for not killing the man, she flees to Constantine, an old-time paroled 'retired' mobster, who shoots Moretti. Constantine tells her that he was plotting to come out of retirement and take over Moretti's turf and that she needs to leave Chicago because she knows too much. If she stays he'll try to protect her, but her debt to Moretti transfers to him.
2	"Family Secrets"	Michael Dinner	Josh Berman & Rob Wright	September 24, 2012	102	3.85
Grace struggles with her double life, taking care of her family and working for the mob. Constantine sends Grace to treat Dante Amato (Terry Kinney), a former rival of Moretti's wanted by the CPD for murder, who is suffering from an undiagnosed life-threatening condition. A woman experiences heart-related mood swings just as she is about to get married. Grace tells Nate about her deal with Constantine, He later asks Constantine for a job.
3	"Protect and Serve"	Ken Olin	Carla Kettner	October 1, 2012	103	3.46
Grace is ordered by Constantine to treat the driver responsible for a hit-and-run accident that involved a family of four and killed the youngest child. Morretti, who Constantine believes did not survive his gunshot wound, is still alive, due to Franco moving him to the mountains. There Morretti plots to take back his turf from Constantine.
4	"Change of Heart"	Michael Dinner	Mick Betancourt	October 8, 2012	105	3.36
Traci Coolidge (Jurnee Smollett) is a woman who is pregnant with the child of a local alderman, David Ellis (Timothy Busfield). Traci is treated by Grace and later finds out that Traci made a deal with Constantine to give the child up for adoption in exchange for money. After Traci gives birth, surgery is necessary, causing Traci to be unable to have any more children, which affects Constantine's original deal to give the child to a Canadian couple. Moretti moves forward with his plans for getting rid of the informant who will get him convicted if he testifies.
5	"Legacy"	Thomas Carter	Cathryn Humphris	November 5, 2012	106	3.40
Constantine asks Grace to end the life of a convict who faked an illness, to give his heart to his estranged daughter who needs a transplant. Brett and Olivia treat two brothers who have similar diagnoses. Constantine asks Nate to go to different bar establishments to have electronic gambling machines installed.
6	"Complications"	Randy Zisk	Carla Kettner	November 12, 2012	107	3.01
Moretti kidnaps Grace to lure Constantine into a trap. A woman is hit by speedboat after swimming in a lake.
7	"Turf War"	Daniel Sackheim	Aaron Helbing & Todd Helbing	November 19, 2012	108	3.08
Two innocent women are caught in the crossfire of a shootout between Constantine and Moretti's crews.
8	"Game Changers"	David Grossman	Erik Oleson	November 26, 2012	109	3.99
Constantine seeks to unify Chicago's underworld while Grace aids an old friend in helping her heroin-addicted daughter. Grace continues to struggle with her double life and Franco reveals to her his status as an undercover cop.
9	"Fluid Dynamics"	Ken Olin	Lance Gentile	December 3, 2012	110	3.26
Russell King (Michael Madsen), an associate of one of Constantine's former rivals, shows at the hospital wanting medical care from Grace. Stafford takes care of a patient, who is admitted to the hospital after a toy store accident that reminds him of his stepson.
10	"Confessions"	Peter Weller	Mick Betancourt & Cathryn Humphris	December 29, 2012	111	2.07
A priest is admitted to the hospital after being bitten by woman while performing an exorcism. Russell King tries to take over Downtown Chicago from Constantine. Nate calls Grace to help with a runaway teen who witnessed a robbery of one of Constantine's businesses.
11	"Sibling Rivalry"	Adam Arkin	Erik Oleson	December 31, 2012	104	2.38
Constantine tries to find out who had a bomb delivered to him. Grace and Brett treat Brett's estranged brother who had a cycling accident.
12	"Resurrection"	Kate Woods	Zachary Lutsky	January 5, 2013	112	2.11
Constantine agrees to protect his estranged son from the Nogales cartel. Grace is asked to find out about Al Trapani's girlfriend's mysterious ailment.
13	"Life and Death"	Michael Watkins	Josh Berman & Rob Wright	January 7, 2013	113	3.27
Constantine and Daniella are admitted to the hospital after being shot in a drive-by shooting in front of the Devlin home. Agent York digs deeper concerning the Devlin family being connected to Constantine. Grace takes desperate measures to settle the score with the cartel Constantine has been feuding with.

== International broadcasts ==
- In Canada, The Mob Doctor was broadcast on Sunday nights at 9:00pm on CTV, premiering on September 16, 2012.
- In Mexico, Televisa started showing The Mob Doctor from June 5, 2013, Monday to Thursday at 11:30pm on Canal 5 under the title La Doctora de la Mafia.
- In the United Kingdom, Sky Living obtained first run premiere rights to The Mob Doctor. Originally, the series was billed to air on Tuesday nights at 10:00pm from August 6, 2013. However, the premiere was moved to Friday nights at 10:00pm from August 9, 2013.

== Home media ==
Sony Pictures Home Entertainment released The Mob Doctor - The Complete Series onto DVD on March 12, 2013, on a 3-disc set.

== Reception ==
=== Critical response ===
The show has been met with "mixed or average" reviews, with a collective score of 42/100 from Metacritic. Mary McNamara of the Los Angeles Times gave the show a neutral rating, observing: "Despite the frantic and at times clunky initial execution, there are times when The Mob Doctor shows signs of transcending the typical doc-with-something-extra medical procedural." Linda Stasi of the New York Post gave the show one and a half stars, saying: "They tried for the tried and true, hoping they'd get The Sopranos meets Grey's Anatomy while filling the hole House left in the schedule. And, like a camel, they ended up with an animal made by committee." David Wiegand of the San Francisco Chronicle gave the show a 0 rating, saying: "The two-taste-treats-in-one thing worked for Hostess Ding-Dongs, so maybe Fox figured it would work for this ding-dong of a dud for the masochists in the crowd."

A few critics, however, had favorable reviews. Glenn Garvin of the Miami Herald praised the concept of the show, saying: "Devlin's complex relationship with the gangsters is what elevates The Mob Doctor into something a cut or two above a Grey's Anatomy rip-off." Diane Werts of Newsday noted that "No, it's not exactly House. But it isn't like any other show, either, with its mad mix of moral dilemmas, medical crises, family ties, double-life-living and, y'know, rubouts 'n' stuff."

=== Ratings ===
No. in Series	Episode	Air Date	Timeslot (EST)	18-49 (Rating/Share)	Viewers (m)
1	"Pilot"	September 17, 2012	Mondays; 9:00 P.M.	1.5/4	5.11
2	"Family Secrets"	September 24, 2012	Mondays; 9:00 P.M.	1.3/3	3.85
3	"Protect and Serve"	October 1, 2012	Mondays; 9:00 P.M.	1.0/2	3.46
4	"Change of Heart"	October 8, 2012	Mondays; 9:00 P.M.	0.9/2	3.36
5	"Legacy"	November 5, 2012	Mondays; 9:00 P.M.	1.0/2	3.40
6	"Complications"	November 12, 2012	Mondays; 9:00 P.M.	0.8/2	3.01
7	"Turf War"	November 19, 2012	Mondays; 9:00 P.M.	0.9/2	3.08
8	"Game Changers"	November 26, 2012	Mondays; 9:00 P.M.	0.8/2	3.01
9	"Fluid Dynamics"	December 3, 2012	Mondays; 9:00 P.M.	0.8/2	3.26
10	"Confessions"	December 29, 2012	Saturday 9:00 P.M.	0.5/2	2.07
11	"Sibling Rivalry"	December 31, 2012	Monday 9:00 P.M.	0.4/1	2.38
12	"Resurrection"	January 5, 2013	Saturday 9:00 P.M.	0.6/2	2.11
13	"Life and Death"	January 7, 2013	Monday 9:00 P.M.	0.9/2	3.27

== See also ==
- The Cleaning Lady (American TV series)
