= Busy Day =

- Film poster
- Directed by: Tamas Nadas
- Written by: Robert Toth (written by), Erika J. Kovacs (English adaptation), Ron Weisberg (screenplay)
- Produced by: Tamas Nadas; Zoltan Hodi; Rian Bishop; Carlo Franco
- Starring: Attila Arpa; Tom Lister, Jr. Quinton Aaron; Keith Jardine; Veronica Diaz-Carranza
- Production companies: Busy Day Productions; 1450 Entertainment; C4 Action Media
- Release date: June 1, 2017
- Country: United States
- Language: English

Busy Day is an American action film written by Robert Toth, and directed and produced by Tamas Nadas. The film stars Attila Arpa, Tom Lister, Jr., Quinton Aaron, Keith Jardine, and Veronica Diaz-Carranza. Tamas Nadas is also the film's executive producer.

== Plot ==
Leo Morello (Attila), a mild-mannered musician and family man, has his life turned upside down when his former business associate Zeus (Eric Martinez) pulls him back into a life he tried so desperately to forget; an ultimatum leaves him facing former adversaries Johnny Burns (Lister) and the Tsar (Jardine).

== Cast ==
- Árpa Attila as Leo Morello
- Tom Lister, Jr. as Johnny Burns
- Quinton Aaron as Ivan
- Keith Jardine as The Tsar
- Veronica Diaz-Carranza as Perla
- Ron Weisberg as Levi
- Nathan Brimmer as Burns' Bodyguard

== Production ==
Filming commenced early June 2015 in Albuquerque, New Mexico. It is produced by Tamas Nadas, Zoltan Hodi, Rian Bishop, and Carlo Franco, along with co-producer Thadd Turner.
