= The Appearing =

- Film poster
- Directed by: Daric Gates
- Written by: Daric Gates; Matthew J. Ryan
- Produced by: Daric Gates; Jody Mortara; Brent Quinones; Chris Roberts; Matthew J. Ryan; Will Wallace
- Starring: Will Wallace; Dean Cain; Don Swayze; Quinton Aaron; Wolfgang Bodison
- Cinematography: Wyatt D. House
- Edited by: Daric Gates; Brent M. Quinones
- Music by: David Das
- Production companies: KK Ranch Productions; Sean Robert Entertainment
- Distributed by: Lionsgate Home Entertainment
- Release date: March 25, 2014
- Running time: 92 minutes
- Country: United States
- Language: English

The Appearing is a 2014 American supernatural horror film directed by Daric Gates and starring Will Wallace, Dean Cain, Don Swayze, Quinton Aaron, Emily Brooks and Wolfgang Bodison.

== Cast ==
- Will Wallace as Michael
- Dean Cain as Dr. Shaw
- Don Swayze as Sheriff Hendricks
- Quinton Aaron as Kenneth
- Emily Brooks as Rachel
- Wolfgang Bodison as Father Callahan
- Joe Estevez as Mental Man

== Reception ==
Matt Molgaard of Horror Freak News wrote that the film "isn’t smooth, and it isn’t steady. It’s more like a wheelin’ session with your best buddy in his brand new, lifted truck. It's everywhere. It's dirty. And you never know when it may just roll right over, or get stuck in knee-high muck."

Lizzie Duncan of HorrorNews.net wrote that the film "is a fairly average film with no big scares in it and only a moderate twist at the end. It’s not terrible, but not too great either. Nothing was overtly ‘wrong’ with the film, but it could have been explored in a more coherent, gripping manner."
