= Fishbowl California =

Film by Michael A. MacRae

- Film poster
- Directed by: Michael A. MacRae
- Written by: Michael A. MacRae; Jordon Hodges; Wyatt Aledort
- Produced by: Michael A. MacRae; Scott Schneider; Anthony Adornetto; Santiago Calogero; Joe Stearns; Pritesh Shah
- Starring: Steve Olson; Katherine Cortez; Katrina Bowden; Kate Flannery; Jenna Willis; Quinton Aaron; Richard Riehle; Tim Bagley
- Cinematography: Chris Faulisi
- Edited by: Mike Hermosa; Matt Kendrick
- Distributed by: Gravitas Ventures
- Release date: May 1, 2018
- Running time: 83 minutes
- Country: United States
- Language: English

Fishbowl California is a 2018 comedy-drama film directed by Michael A. MacRae. It stars Steve Olson, Katrina Bowden, Katherine Cortez, Kate Flannery, Quinton Aaron, Tim Bagley, Jenna Willis and Richard Riehle. It premiered on March 24, 2018, at the Columbus International Film & Animation Festival. It was released by Gravitas Ventures on May 1, 2018.

== Plot ==
Rodney (Steve Olson), about to turn 30, has no job or ambition. This changes when he meets June (Katherine Cortez), a reclusive widow.

== Cast ==
- Steve Olson as Rodney
- Katherine Cortez as June
- Katrina Bowden as Tess
- Kate Flannery as Susan
- Quinton Aaron as Rad Chad
- Tim Bagley as Woody
- Richard Riehle as Glen
- Max Adler as Billy Kobrin
- Jenna Willis as Olivia
- Josh Sussman as Philip

== Production ==
Filming took place in Los Angeles, primarily North Hollywood, West Hollywood and Burbank, between March and April 2017.

== Release ==
The film premiered in March 2018 at the Columbus International Film & Animation Festival and was released by Gravitas Ventures on May 1, 2018.

== Reception ==
Aaron Peterson of The Hollywood Outsider praised Cortez's acting and wrote that the film is "emphatically worth the visit".

Matthew Parkinson of Cinemarter.com gave it a middling review: "Fishbowl California is a harmless but unambitious indie comedy".

Jeff York of the Chicago Independent Film Critic's Circle noted, "There's a quiet nobility to these has-been's and never-was' on display in Fishbowl California. This little indie-that-could will put a lump in your throat, in between laughs. The movie is quite the Valentine to the town and its lovable eccentrics."

John Arkelian of Artsforum Magazine gave it a "B-/B", saying the story has "a quirky sensibility, with nice dryly comedic bits with assorted supporting players."
