= Just Legal =

Television series

- Jay Baruchel as Skip Ross and Don Johnson as Grant Cooper
- Genre: Legal drama
- Created by: Jonathan Shapiro
- Starring: Don Johnson; Jay Baruchel; Jaime Lee Kirchner; Susan Ward
- Country of origin: United States
- Original language: English
- No. of seasons: 1
- No. of episodes: 8

Production
- Executive producers: Jerry Bruckheimer; Jonathan Littman; Jonathan Shapiro
- Production locations: Venice, Los Angeles, California
- Camera setup: Single-Camera
- Running time: 43 minutes
- Production companies: Jerry Bruckheimer Television; Warner Bros. Television

Original release
- Network: The WB
- Release: September 19, 2005 – September 10, 2006

Just Legal is an American courtroom drama television series that stars Don Johnson and Jay Baruchel as two courtroom lawyers in Venice, California. The series premiered on The WB on September 19, 2005, and was canceled on October 3, 2005, after three episodes had been aired. Almost a year later The WB burned off five additional episodes following a repeat of the pilot on August 6, 2006. The series concluded on September 10, 2006. This is the last show on The WB to end its run before its rebrand to The CW.

== Synopsis ==
Don Johnson and Jay Baruchel star as two "amusingly mismatched lawyers" that "comes at you unassumingly." David "Skip" Ross (Baruchel), 18, is a legal genius who graduated from law school at the top of his class, but now can find no one to hire him. Enter Grant Cooper, a washed-up middle-aged lawyer who has made one too many bad choices in his career, leaving him a jaded court-appointed attorney, rejected by his peers. Skip is Grant's golf caddy, and he convinces Grant just to let him write a legal brief for him; but when they arrive at the courthouse, Grant is told he needs a "second chair" (an attorney to sit at the second seat at counsel's table), and he gives them the only one he has: Skip Ross. Grant has no intention of actually bringing Skip into his practice, but his charm, enthusiasm, intelligence, and most of all, ability to actually win a case, win Grant over.

There are a variety of cases featured on the show, from murder cases to botched plastic surgery. Many of the storylines are based on real-life cases. Grant and Skip do their own "dirty work" for their cases, going to crime scenes and interviewing witnesses, as Grant teaches Skip more about what it means to be a “real lawyer” and Skip teaches Grant more about what it means to trust in people. The series is set in Venice and neighboring Santa Monica, California.

== Cast and characters ==
- Don Johnson as Grant H. Cooper: A functioning alcoholic with a cynical view of the world, Cooper is nonetheless touched by the enthusiasm and idealism he sees in his unlikely new protégé. Skip's brilliant mind allowed him to excel at all things academic, but he had a sheltered upbringing and now finds himself in the working world with few social skills to fall back on. Skip needs the practical advice that can only come from an experienced trial lawyer, and Cooper is only too happy to have someone around to do the "grunt" work. As he helps the young man make the transition from school and boyhood to the tough world of court and manhood, Cooper is reminded of the best part of himself—the part that got lost along the way. Cooper repeatedly prides himself with being "jaded" after 27 years on the job. After refusing to agree to a plea bargain for one of his clients (several years before the series begins), he lost the case and that client was put to death by lethal injection, which for Cooper was the beginning of his downward spiral. From then on, he was forced to make a living as a small-time ambulance chaser, and has no problem admitting to it.
- Jay Baruchel as David "Skip" Ross: David Ross is nicknamed "Skip" by his peers, not because he skipped classes, but rather because he skipped so many grades through his young life. By age 18 he is already a lawyer and a member of the California Bar Association, having graduated first in his class. His ambition is to become the best trial lawyer ever, originally inspired by one of his favorite movies, To Kill a Mockingbird. Unfortunately for him, no downtown law firm is willing to hire him because of his age. His young age is also hard on him because it is difficult for him to find a place to rent, since no one will believe that he is an actual lawyer. With Grant's help, Skip learns the inner workings of the legal system and the "do"s and "don't"s about courtroom law. Unlike Cooper, Skip is an optimist and looks at everything in a positive way. Skip cannot escape the fact that his college friend, Kate Manat (Susan Ward) has been hired by a downtown law firm and is often on the opposite side of the courtroom, a situation made more awkward by the fact that he is attracted to her. David "Skip" Ross is similar to Doogie Howser, M.D.
- Jaime Lee Kirchner as Dulcinea "Dee" Real: The law office has only one employee, Dulcinea "Dee" Real, a former client of Cooper's who took the job to pay off her legal fees and fulfill her parole requirements. An African American in her mid-twenties, Dee is tough, blue collar and strikingly beautiful; a woman who looks amazing in jeans, a T-shirt and an electronic ankle bracelet. Her crime was murder and although Cooper managed to get the charge reduced to manslaughter, he was not able to keep her out of jail. Though he won't admit it, Cooper feels guilty that Dee ended up serving time. Smart, capable and completely immune to Cooper's charm, Dee can hold her own against Cooper and Skip, and she often manages to intimidate them both.
- Reiley McClendon as Tom Ross, Skip's little brother. He's cool, calm, suave, and a likable guy. Unfortunately for him, he isn't as smart as his older brother, since he has failed 10th grade. He also can't seem to understand why Skip is such a workaholic and why his brother doesn't have much of a social life. Tom also enjoys hanging out at his brother's apartment, even though Skip doesn't approve.
- Susan Ward as Kate Manat: Skip and Kate were college friends and study partners. Kate was hired by one of the downtown law firms that did not hire Skip.

== Episodes ==
No.	Title	Directed by	Written by	Original release date	Prod. code	US viewers (millions)
1	"Pilot"	Andrew Davis	Jonathan Shapiro	September 19, 2005	475279	3.44
After graduating from law school at 18, David "Skip" Ross finds his dreams of becoming a great trial lawyer thwarted when he is rejected by a prestigious law firm due to his age. After caddying for Grant Cooper, a once great lawyer now burnt-out by the pressures of life who runs his own less than respectable firm, Skip is offered a job with the promise to get trial experience. Skip's parents have concerns about his decision to work with Cooper. As they work Skip's first case, a woman accused of killing her boyfriend's rival drug dealer, Skip helps Cooper regain a belief in himself and the cases they are working.
2	"The Runner"	Dwight H. Little	Jonathan Shapiro	September 26, 2005	2T7001	2.96
When a liquor store is robbed and the store clerk is killed the police arrest Zeke Rawlins (Jocko Sims), an African-American man fleeing the scene. Skip, believing Zeke's claims of innocence, builds their case around the police arresting the "nearest person of color". Cooper and Skip are caught off guard by the final witness in the trial. Skip and Cooper also meet Kate, a former classmate of Skip's, who is working at the law firm that rejected Skip.
3	"The Limit"	John Badham	Rob Bragin	October 3, 2005	2T7002	2.88
4	"The Body in the Trunk"	Tim Matheson	Craig S. O'Neill & Jason Tracy	August 13, 2006	2T7003	N/A
5	"The Heater"	Dennis Smith	Nick Thiel	August 20, 2006	2T7004	1.59
6	"The Rainmaker"	Dwight H. Little	Rama Laurie Stagner	August 27, 2006	2T7005	1.12
7	"The Code"	Oz Scott	Alfredo Barrios Jr.	September 3, 2006	2T7006	1.34
8	"The Bar"	Kevin Dowling	Jonathan Shapiro	September 10, 2006	2T7007	1.48

== Cancellation and reairing ==
Just Legal was cancelled in October 2005 after only three episodes aired due to low ratings; the program lost a large portion of its lead-in 7th Heaven’s audience and came in last place among the six major broadcast networks in its Monday night timeslot. After almost a year off the air, the series returned on August 6, 2006 with a rerun of the pilot episode, followed by the network burning off the final five episodes on subsequent Sundays. The final episode aired on September 10, 2006.

== Popular culture references ==
- Don Johnson's character, Grant Cooper, is much like his role of Det. Sonny Crockett on Miami Vice, in that both are cynical, jaded men of the law who do know right from wrong but are willing to stand up against the powers that be if necessary.
- In the episode The Heater, Grant Cooper says, "I used to live on a boat." This is a subtle reference to his days on Miami Vice, where he played Det. Sonny Crockett who lived on the boat St. Vitus Dance.
- Cooper was also the surname of his partner Rico Tubbs's alias on Miami Vice ("Rico Cooper").
- Names like Nancy Grace, Mark Geragos, Johnnie Cochran, and Greta Van Susteren were mentioned in the show.
- Famous modern-day courtroom cases such as those of Scott Peterson and Robert Blake were mentioned.
