= List of Drop Dead Diva episodes =

The following is an episode list for the Lifetime series Drop Dead Diva, a comedic drama series telling the story of a shallow model-in-training who dies in a sudden accident only to find her soul resurfacing in the body of a brilliant, thoughtful and plus-size attorney.

A total of 78 episodes of Drop Dead Diva were produced over six seasons, between July 12, 2009, and June 22, 2014.

== Series overview ==
Season	Episodes	Originally released	
Season	Episodes	First released	Last released
1	13	July 12, 2009	October 11, 2009
2	13	June 6, 2010	August 29, 2010
3	13	June 19, 2011	September 25, 2011
4	13	June 3, 2012	September 9, 2012
5	13	June 23, 2013	November 3, 2013
6	13	March 23, 2014	June 22, 2014

== Episodes ==
=== Season 1 (2009) ===
No. overall	No. in season	Title	Directed by	Written by	Original release date	U.S. viewers (millions)
1	1	"Pilot"	James Hayman	Josh Berman	July 12, 2009	2.81
2	2	"The F Word"	Ron Underwood	Carla Kettner & Josh Berman	July 19, 2009	2.46
3	3	"Do Over"	Michael Lange	Alex Taub	July 26, 2009	2.80
4	4	"The Chinese Wall"	Lawrence Trilling	Thania St. John	August 2, 2009	2.64
5	5	"Lost and Found"	David Petrarca	Jeanette Collins & Mimi Friedman	August 9, 2009	2.44
6	6	"Second Chances"	Michael Schultz	Jeffrey Lippman	August 16, 2009	3.06
7	7	"The Magic Bullet"	Jamie Babbit	Shawn Schepps	August 23, 2009	2.90
8	8	"Crazy"	Melanie Mayron	Maurissa Tancharoen	August 30, 2009	3.41
9	9	"The Dress"	David Petrarca	Josh Berman	September 13, 2009	3.08
10	10	"Make Me a Match"	Matt Hastings	Thania St. John	September 20, 2009	3.06
11	11	"What If"	Bethany Rooney	Jeanette Collins & Mimi Friedman	September 27, 2009	2.52
12	12	"Dead Model Walking"	Ron Underwood	Amy Engelberg & Wendy Engelberg	October 4, 2009	2.79
13	13	"Grayson's Anatomy"	David Petrarca	Alex Taub & Jeffrey Lippman	October 11, 2009	2.79

=== Season 2 (2010) ===
No. overall	No. in season	Title	Directed by	Written by	Original release date	U.S. viewers (millions)
14	1	"Would I Lie to You?"	Michael Lange	Josh Berman	June 6, 2010	3.12
15	2	"Back From the Dead"	Melanie Mayron	Alex Taub	June 13, 2010	2.87
16	3	"The Long Road to Napa"	Jamie Babbit	Jeremy Littman & Morgan Gendel	June 20, 2010	2.57
17	4	"Home Away From Home"	Kevin Dowling	Jeffrey Lippman	June 27, 2010	2.38
18	5	"Senti-Mental Journey"	Rick Rosenthal	Jeanette Collins & Mimi Friedman	July 11, 2010	2.47
19	6	"Begin Again"	Michael Lange	David Feige	July 18, 2010	2.41
20	7	"A Mother's Secret"	Arlene Sanford	Josh Berman	July 25, 2010	2.59
21	8	"Queen of Mean"	Michael Grossman	Amy Engelberg & Wendy Engelberg	August 1, 2010	2.43
22	9	"Last Year's Model"	Jamie Babbit	Jeffrey Lippman & Alex Taub	August 8, 2010	2.43
23	10	"Will & Grayson"	David Warren	Jeremy Littman & Morgan Gendel	August 15, 2010	2.56
24	11	"Good Grief"	Bethany Rooney	Jeanette Collins & Mimi Friedman	August 22, 2010	2.68
25	12	"Bad Girls"	John Terlesky	Amy Engelberg & Wendy Engelberg	August 29, 2010	2.57
26	13	"Freeze the Day"	Michael Lange	Alex Taub & Jeffrey Lippman	August 29, 2010	2.61

=== Season 3 (2011) ===
No. overall	No. in season	Title	Directed by	Written by	Original release date	U.S. viewers (millions)
27	1	"Hit and Run"	Jamie Babbit	Josh Berman	June 19, 2011	2.86
28	2	"False Alarm"	Michael Grossman	Alex Taub	June 26, 2011	2.38
29	3	"Dream Big"	Martha Coolidge	Rob Wright	July 10, 2011	2.01
30	4	"The Wedding"	Kevin Hooks	Sandy Isaac	July 17, 2011	2.27
31	5	"Prom"	Jamie Babbit	Sarah McLaughlin	July 24, 2011	2.08
32	6	"Closure"	Michael Grossman	William N. Fordes	July 31, 2011	2.09
33	7	"Mothers Day"	Kevin Hooks	Jeffrey Lippman	August 7, 2011	2.36
34	8	"He Said, She Said"	Tim Matheson	Amy Engelberg & Wendy Engelberg	August 14, 2011	2.39
35	9	"You Bet Your Life"	Dwight Little	Rob Wright	August 21, 2011	2.23
36	10	"Toxic"	Michael Schultz	Sandy Isaac & Sarah McLaughlin	August 28, 2011	2.53
37	11	"Ah Men"	Robert J. Wilson	Adam R. Perlman	September 4, 2011	1.93
38	12	"Bride-a-Palooza"	Michael Grossman	Amy and Wendy Engelberg & William N. Fordes	September 18, 2011	2.18
39	13	"Change of Heart"	Jamie Babbit	Jeffrey Lippman & Alex Taub	September 25, 2011	2.12

=== Season 4 (2012) ===
No. overall	No. in season	Title	Directed by	Written by	Original release date	U.S. viewers (millions)
40	1	"Welcome Back"	Michael Grossman	Josh Berman	June 3, 2012	2.30
41	2	"Home"	Dwight Little	Alex Taub	June 10, 2012	2.12
42	3	"Freak Show"	John Murray	Rob Wright	June 17, 2012	2.17
43	4	"Winning Ugly"	Jamie Babbit	Alfonso H. Moreno	June 24, 2012	2.04
44	5	"Happily Ever After"	Tim Matheson	Amy Engelberg & Wendy Engelberg	July 1, 2012	1.87
45	6	"Rigged"	J. Miller Tobin	Lynne E. Litt & William N. Fordes	July 8, 2012	2.28
46	7	"Crushed"	Michael Grossman	Josh Berman	July 15, 2012	2.55
47	8	"Road Trip"	Kevin Hooks	Jeffrey Lippman	July 22, 2012	2.13
48	9	"Ashes to Ashes"	Michael Grossman	Rob Wright	August 5, 2012	2.26
49	10	"Lady Parts"	Robert J. Wilson	Alfonso H. Moreno & Lynne E. Litt	August 12, 2012	2.36
50	11	"Family Matters"	Augie Hess	Amy and Wendy Engelberg & William N. Fordes	August 19, 2012	2.54
51	12	"Picks & Pakes"	Jamie Babbit	Joshua V. Gilbert & Oscar Balderrama	August 26, 2012	2.49
52	13	"Jane's Getting Married"	Michael Grossman	Josh Berman & Jeffrey Lippman	September 9, 2012	2.76

=== Season 5 (2013) ===
No. overall	No. in season	Title	Directed by	Written by	Original release date	U.S. viewers (millions)
53	1	"Back from the Dead"	Robert J. Wilson	Josh Berman	June 23, 2013	2.15
54	2	"The Real Jane"	Michael Grossman	Josh Berman	June 30, 2013	2.14
55	3	"Surrogates"	J. Miller Tobin	Jeffrey Lippman & David Feige	July 7, 2013	2.16
56	4	"Cheaters"	David Grossman	Amy Engelberg & Wendy Engelberg	July 14, 2013	2.10
57	5	"Secret Lives"	Michael Grossman	Marty Scott	July 21, 2013	2.20
58	6	"Fool for Love"	Michael Grossman	Steve Lichtman	July 28, 2013	2.15
59	7	"Missed Congeniality"	Bethany Rooney	David Feige & Jeffrey Lippman	August 4, 2013	2.15
60	8	"50 Shades of Grayson"	Michael Grossman	Josh Berman & Marty Scott	August 11, 2013	2.45
61	9	"Trust Me"	Michael Grossman	Zac Hug	October 6, 2013	1.44
62	10	"The Kiss"	Jamie Babbit	Amy Engelberg & David Feige	October 13, 2013	1.56
63	11	"One Shot"	Dwight Little	Wendy Engelberg & Jeffrey Lippman	October 20, 2013	1.77
64	12	"Guess Who's Coming"	Michael Grossman	Eric Buchman	October 27, 2013	1.80
65	13	"Jane's Secret Revealed"	Robert J. Wilson	Josh Berman	November 3, 2013	1.78

=== Season 6 (2014) ===
No. overall	No. in season	Title	Directed by	Written by	Original release date	U.S. viewers (millions)
66	1	"Truth & Consequences"	Robert J. Wilson	Josh Berman	March 23, 2014	1.11
67	2	"Soulmates?"	Michael Grossman	Amy Engelberg & David Feige	March 23, 2014	1.16
68	3	"First Date"	Robert J. Wilson	Jeffrey Lippman & Wendy Engelberg	March 30, 2014	1.25
69	4	"Life & Death"	Michael Grossman	Josh Berman & Marty Scott	April 6, 2014	1.39
70	5	"Cheers & Jeers"	Robert J. Wilson	Jeffrey Lippman & David Feige	April 13, 2014	1.08
71	6	"Desperate Housewife"	Michael Grossman	Amy Engelberg & Wendy Engelberg	April 27, 2014	1.32
72	7	"Sister Act"	Robert J. Wilson	Josh Berman & Marty Scott	May 4, 2014	1.51
73	8	"Identity Crisis"	Robert J. Wilson	David Feige & Amy Engelberg	May 11, 2014	1.20
74	9	"Hope and Glory"	Bethany Rooney	Jeffrey Lippman & Wendy Engelberg	May 18, 2014	1.29
75	10	"No Return"	Michael Grossman	Josh Berman & Marty Scott	June 1, 2014	1.69
76	11	"Afterlife"	Dwight Little	Marty Scott & Tyler Dinucci	June 8, 2014	1.50
77	12	"Hero"	J. Miller Tobin	Eric Buchman	June 15, 2014	1.50
78	13	"It Had To Be You"	Robert J. Wilson	Josh Berman	June 22, 2014	1.66

== Ratings ==
Drop Dead Diva : U.S. viewers per episode (millions)

Season	Episode number												
Season	1	2	3	4	5	6	7	8	9	10	11	12	13
1	2.81	2.46	2.80	2.64	2.44	3.06	2.90	3.41	3.08	3.06	2.52	2.79	2.79
2	3.12	2.87	2.57	2.38	2.47	2.41	2.59	2.43	2.43	2.56	2.68	2.57	2.61
3	2.86	2.38	2.01	2.27	2.08	2.09	2.36	2.39	2.23	2.53	1.93	2.18	2.12
4	2.30	2.12	2.17	2.04	1.87	2.28	2.55	2.13	2.26	2.36	2.54	2.49	2.76
5	2.15	2.14	2.16	2.10	2.20	2.15	2.15	2.45	1.44	1.56	1.77	1.80	1.76
6	1.11	1.16	1.25	1.39	1.08	1.32	1.51	1.20	1.29	1.69	1.50	1.50	1.66

Audience measurement performed by Nielsen Media Research
