= Tommy Lister Jr. =

American actor and wrestler (1958–2020)

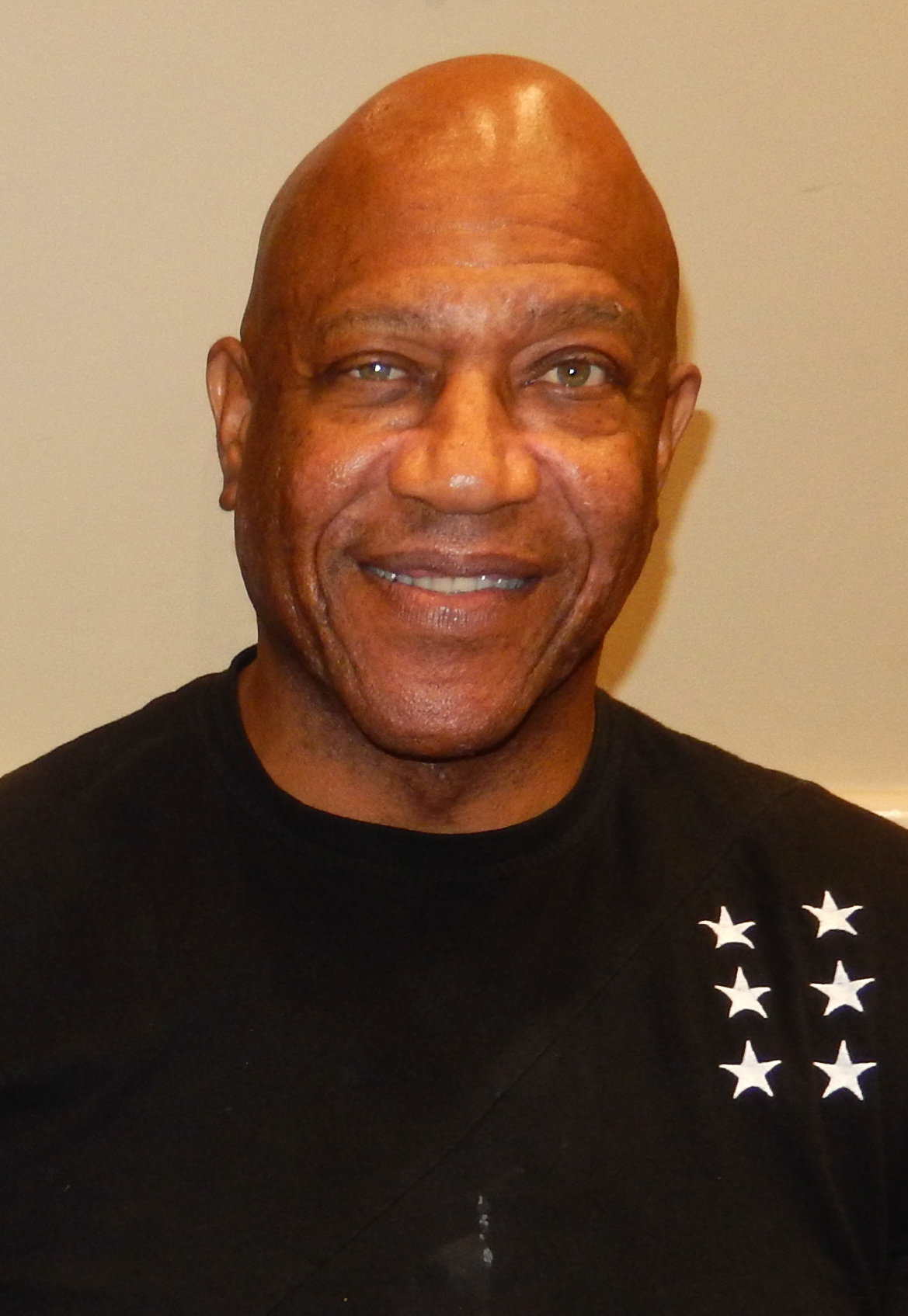
- Lister in 2018.
- Born: Thomas Duane Lister Jr. June 24, 1958; Pine Bluff, Arkansas, U.S.
- Died: December 10, 2020 (aged 62); Marina del Rey, California, U.S.
- Other names: Tom Lister; Tiny; Deebo; Zeus
- Occupations: Actor; professional wrestler
- Years active: 1984–2020
- Spouse: Felicia Forbes (m. 2003)
- Children: 1
- Professional wrestling career
- Ring name(s): Zeus; Z-Gangsta
- Billed height: 6 ft 5 in (196 cm)
- Billed weight: 300 lb (136 kg)
- Billed from: Parts unknown
- Debut: April 25, 1989
- Retired: March 24, 1996

Tommy Debo "Tiny" Lister Jr. (born Thomas Duane Lister Jr.; June 24, 1958 – December 10, 2020) was an American actor and professional wrestler. As a character actor, he is known for his roles as the neighborhood bully Deebo in the 1995 film Friday and its 2000 sequel, and as President Lindberg in The Fifth Element. He had two short professional wrestling stints, with Hulk Hogan in the World Wrestling Federation (WWF) after appearing as Zeus in the 1989 film No Holds Barred and resuming the feud as Z-Gangsta in 1996 for World Championship Wrestling (WCW). He was born with a detached and deformed retina and was blind in his right eye, which drooped, a unique look that he turned to his advantage in film. He played in both comedies and dramas, usually cast as 'the heavy/big bully'.

== Early life ==
Lister was born on June 24, 1958, in Pine Bluff, Arkansas, to Thomas Duane Lister Sr. and Mildred (née Edwards) Lister. He grew up in Compton, California. Since birth, he had a deformed and detached retina in his right eye, causing permanent blindness in that eye.

Lister attended Palomar Junior College before transferring to Long Beach City College for his sophomore year. While at Long Beach, he recorded a 52 ft (16 m) shot put throw, which helped to earn him a scholarship to California State University, Los Angeles. In his senior year, he won the national shot put title with a mark of over 61 ft 8 in (18.8 m). Lister was the 1982 NCAA Division II National Shot Put Champion.

After college, Lister competed for the Converse Track Club, eventually raising his shot put mark to 64 ft 3 in (19.58 m), before trying out with the New Orleans Breakers of the United States Football League. He was cut after two exhibition games and opted to pursue acting instead.

== Acting career ==
Lister was mostly recognized as the antagonist known as Deebo from 1995's Friday. He reprised the role in the film's sequel, Next Friday (2000), but did not appear in the third film of the series, Friday After Next (2002). He did, however, appear in Cube's directorial debut The Players Club. He played the role of Obodo in Mario Van Peebles' Posse (1993), along with Tone Loc.

Lister had numerous guest appearances on TV series, including playing Klaang, the first Klingon to make contact with humans, in the pilot episode of Star Trek: Enterprise. He co-starred in a two-part episode of the courtroom series Matlock as Mr. Matlock's in-prison bodyguard. He appeared in season 7 episode 9 of In the Heat of the Night, and in season 1 episode 15 of ER. He also starred in the sitcom 1st & Ten as Otis.

Lister's film roles included playing in The Dark Knight and Austin Powers in Goldmember. Lister was featured in The Fifth Element as the Galactic President. He appeared in the Adam Sandler film Little Nicky as Nicky's older brother Cassius.

Lister was the main police officer in Chamillionaire's "Ridin'" video and reprised his role as a police officer in Chamillionaire's 2012 single "Show Love". He has appeared in the Ice Cube videos for "Friday" (from the Friday soundtrack) and "You Can Do It" (from the Next Friday soundtrack). Lister appeared via both original footage and clips from the film. He was in the videos for Young Bleed's "How You Do Dat", French Montana's "I Told 'Em" and 50 Cent's "Many Men (Wish Death)". Lister portrayed Sancho in the Sublime music video "Santeria".

In the Quentin Tarantino film Jackie Brown, he played bail agent Winston, who "finds people who don't want to be found". In 2015, Lister filmed Busy Day in Albuquerque, New Mexico. Lister had a supporting role in the 2016 Disney animated movie Zootopia as the voice of the diminutive fennec fox, Finnick. He appeared in a commercial that year for Ball Park-brand beef jerky, advertised as "tough, but tender."

In the 40 years of his acting career, Lister accumulated more than 200 acting credits.

Cast as a habitual "bad guy" in films, his career prospered. He was a frequent collaborator with Ice Cube. Lister later became the spokesperson for Monster Energy Drink in the 2010s.

== Professional wrestling career ==
=== World Wrestling Federation (1989–1990) ===
Lister appeared in the 1989 wrestling movie No Holds Barred, which was financed by the World Wrestling Federation (WWF) and starred Hulk Hogan. Lister's role was Zeus, a brutal monster heel. No Holds Barred inspired a feud in the WWF during the latter half of 1989. Lister was billed as "Zeus: The Human Wrecking Machine", and used the same "monster heel" gimmick in his matches by no-selling his opponent's moves. He would yell, "Aw! Aw!" and pound on his chest several times during his interviews and in the ring. Zeus would eventually demand Hogan to face him in the ring.

Citing jealousy for being billed under Hogan and anger over losing to Hogan in the film, Zeus wanted to beat him in "real life". Zeus formed an alliance with fellow Hogan rival "Macho Man" Randy Savage to feud with Hogan and his friend, Brutus "The Barber" Beefcake. The two teams faced off at the 1989 SummerSlam event in a tag team match which saw Hogan and Beefcake prevail as the victors, with Hogan pinning Zeus. Following SummerSlam, Zeus formed an alliance with "The Million Dollar Man" Ted DiBiase leading into that year's Survivor Series.

At the event, the team of The Hulkamaniacs (Hulk Hogan, Jake "The Snake" Roberts, and Demolition) faced The Million Dollar Team (Ted DiBiase, Zeus, and The Powers of Pain). Zeus was eliminated from the match via disqualification after refusing to break a chokehold on Hogan and shoving the referee away. The Hulkamaniacs went on to win the match, defeating the other team. After the Survivor Series, the feud between Hulk Hogan and Brutus Beefcake versus Randy Savage and Zeus ended with a steel cage match on December 27, 1989, at the No Holds Barred pay-per-view event. Hogan and Beefcake were once again victorious in what would be Zeus's last match in the WWF. Lister's final WWF appearance was a promotional spot for the 1990 Royal Rumble.

=== World Wrestling Council (1990) ===
On July 7, 1990, Zeus fought Abdullah the Butcher in a double countout at a World Wrestling Council 1990 WWC Aniversario show in Puerto Rico.

=== World Championship Wrestling (1996) ===
Lister spent March 1996 in World Championship Wrestling (WCW) as Z-Gangsta, as part of The Alliance to End Hulkamania, culminating in failure at Uncensored. He debuted the previous week with fellow actor/wrestler Robert Swenson, who was billed as The Ultimate Solution.

== Legacy and awards ==
U.S. national shot put title with a mark of over 61 ft 8 in (18.8 m) and 1982 NCAA Division II National Shot Put Champion.

The athletic department of Lister's alma mater Cal State LA sponsors an annual track meet in his name.

In 2016, he was nominated for the "Best Bad Mu#&a Award" at the All Def Movie Awards. In 2014 at the Orlando Urban Film Festival, he won "Best Star Spotlight" for his performance in No Weapon Formed Against Us.

== Personal life ==
=== Marriage ===
He was married to Felicia Forbes in Cape Town, South Africa, in 2003; they have one daughter named Faith Grace Lister.

=== Legal issues ===
On August 31, 2012, Lister agreed to plead guilty to conspiring to commit mortgage fraud, in a scheme that led to $3.8 million in losses. He was charged with fraudulently buying homes in order to withdraw $1.1 million in home equity loans. In April 2014, he was out on bail and was confident of avoiding prison. He stated, "What's so cool about God and our government is that you can make a mistake and they will forgive you if you just a good person and doing right."

=== Health problems ===
By age 55, Lister had type 2 diabetes.

Lister was diagnosed with COVID-19 around August 2020 and overcame the illness. He became ill with symptoms similar to COVID-19 a second time in early December, exhibiting weakness and trouble breathing, which forced him to cancel shooting for a film. His manager Cindy McGowen, who said it was not normal for him to miss filmings, became concerned and sent her assistant to his house to give him vitamins and antibiotics.

== Death ==
On December 10, 2020, police performing a wellness check found Lister dead in his home in Marina del Rey, California; he was 62 years old. The coroner's office investigated his cause of death and the final autopsy report revealed that the cause of death was hypertension and atherosclerotic cardiovascular disease.

In a Twitter encomium, Ice Cube recalled Lister's sense of humor: "RIP Tiny 'Deebo' Lister. America's favorite bully was a born entertainer who would pop into character at the drop of a hat terrifying people on and off camera. Followed by a big smile and laugh ... Thank you for being a good dude at heart. I miss you already."

== Championships and accomplishments ==
- Pro Wrestling Illustrated
  - PWI ranked him #500 of the top 500 singles wrestlers in the PWI 500 in 1991

== Filmography ==
=== Film ===
Year	Title	Role	Notes
1985	Runaway Train	Black Guard	Film debut role
1986	8 Million Ways to Die	Nose Guard	
1986	Blue City	Tiny	
1986	Armed and Dangerous	Bruno	
1986	Wired to Kill	Sleet	
1987	Extreme Prejudice	Monday	
1987	Beverly Hills Cop II	Orvis	
1987	Prison	Tiny	
1988	The Night Before	Bartender	
1989	No Holds Barred	Zeus	
1989	Homer and Eddie	Man in Bar with Gun	
1989	Midnight	Security Guard	
1990	Think Big	'Z'	
1990	Secret Agent 00 Soul	—N/a	
1991	9 ^{1}/_{2} Ninjas!	Cutter	
1991	Trabbi Goes to Hollywood	Cubey	
1991	Talkin' Dirty After Dark	Bigg	
1992	Universal Soldier	GR86	
1992	Trespass	Cletus	
1993	Posse	Obobo	
1993	The Meteor Man	Digit	
1994	Immortal Combat	Yanagi	
1994	Men of War	Blades	
1994	Don Juan DeMarco	Rocco Compton	
1995	Hologram Man	Eightball	Direct-to-video
1995	Friday	Deebo	
1995	Things to Do in Denver When You're Dead	House	
1995	The Kangaroo	Sadran	
1996	A Thin Line Between Love and Hate	Tyrone	
1996	Barb Wire	Bouncer	
1996	Phat Beach	Tiny	
1996	White Cargo	Zeno	
1996	Street Corner Justice	Angel Aikens	
1997	The Good Bad Guy	Mobster #2	
1997	The Fifth Element	President Lindberg	
1997	Below Utopia	Tiny	
1997	Gang Related	Cutlass Supreme	
1997	Hoover Park	Zues	
1997	Jackie Brown	Winston	
1997	A Time to Revenge	Corporal Hollis	
1998	The Players Club	XL	
1998	I Got the Hook-Up	T-Lay	
1998	Butter	House	
1999	Wishmaster 2: Evil Never Dies	Tillaver	Direct-to-video
1999	Judgment Day	Brother Clarence	Direct-to-video
1999	Stealth Fighter	Berg	
1999	Shark in a Bottle	The Recruiter	
2000	Next Friday	Deebo	
2000	Circus	Moose	
2000	Little Nicky	Cassius	
2000	The Cheapest Movie Ever Made	Kevin	
2001	The Duo	Tiny Lister, Jr.	
2001	Vegas, City of Dreams	Llord's Security Chief	
2001	Out Kold	Sweet	
2001	Soulkeeper	Chad	
2001	The Wash	Bear	
2002	Austin Powers in Goldmember	Prisoner #2	
2003	Confidence	Harlin	
2003	Keepin' It Real	A-Train Tranton	
2003	Love Chronicles	Alfonso	
2003	Hellborn	Smithy	
2004	My Baby's Daddy	Drive By	
2004	Never Die Alone	Rockie	
2004	Knocked the "F" Out	—N/a	
2004	A Night in Compton	Rainmaker	
2004	Dracula 3000	Humvee	
2004	Slammed	Bubba	
2004	El Padrino	T-Bone	
2004	Hair Show	Agent Little	
2004	Blast	Smiley	
2004	Full Clip	Bumaye	
2004	Choices 2	—N/a	Direct-to-video
2005	County General	Big Murder	
2005	Santa's Slay	Gas Attendant	
2006	Forbidden Fruits	Jade	Direct-to-video
2006	One Night with the King	Hagai	
2006	Who Made the Potatoe Salad?	Monster	
2007	The Still Life	Art Buyer	
2007	Da Block Party 2	C.J.'s Father	Direct-to-video
2007	Vegas Vampires	Andrew Johnson	
2007	Ascension Day	Will	Direct-to-video
2007	The Pink Conspiracy	The Duke	
2007	The Grand	German's Bodyguard	
2007	Bone Dry	Mitch	
2007	Lady Samurai	Big Luther	
2008	The Hustle	Dog Thief	
2008	Terra Nova	Sewing Dude	
2008	The Dark Knight	Tattooed Prisoner	
2009	Block Party Madness	Slim	Direct-to-video
2009	Unemployed	Big Dane	
2009	The Rimshop	Duncan	
2009	Miss B's Hair Salon	Mr. Biggs	
2009	Super Capers	Sarge	
2009	Holy Water	SixPac Jordan	
2010	First Dog	Big Mike	
2010	The Lazarus Papers	Tiny Delaney	
2010	Lean Like a Cholo	Crazy Loc	
2010	Food Stamps	Reggie The Mail Man	
2011	The Sixth	Priest	Short project film
2011	Hopelessly in June	Pastor G	
2011	The Trap Door	Jomo	Direct-to-video
2011	Cornered	Captain Williams	
2011	The Preacher's Family	Jackson Hines	
2012	Noah	Roaring Giant	Voiceover
2012	We the Party	No Shame	
2012	72 Hours with Empire	Deebo	Short project film
2012	Beyond the Trophy	Billy Thomas	
2012	Hillbilly Highway	Wilbert	
2012	K-11	Detroit	
2012	Heaven's Door	Ben Wilson	
2012	Silent No More	Blake	
2013	White T	Mad Rapper	
2013	Comedy of Errorz	—N/a	
2014	Engage the Vision	Deebo	Short project film
2014	Vultures in the Void	Space Clown	Short project film
2015	Tiny and the Optometrist	Himself	Short project film
2015	American Justice	Justice	
2015	The Amazing Wizard of Paws	Diner Manager	Direct-to-video
2015	The Human Centipede 3 (Final Sequence)	Inmate 178	
2015	The Whole World at Our Feet	Louie	
2015	Tamales and Gumbo	Uncle Mark	
2015	Death's Door	Jomo	
2015	If I Tell You I Have to Kill You	Gabriel	
2015	No Weapon Formed Against Us	Jackson Hines	
2016	Woman Scorned	Brandon	Short project film
2016	Zootopia	Finnick	Voiceover
2016	Hickey	Henry	
2016	Beyond the Game	Ezra	
2016	Of Sentimental Value	Tee	
2016	Hauntsville	Kaine	
2017	2016	Rondo	
2017	Boone: The Bounty Hunter	Man in TV Show	
2017	Busy Day	Johnny Burns	
2018	Fury of the Fist and the Golden Fleece	Superfly	
2019	Slasher Party	Smiley Face	
2019	I Got the Hook Up 2	T-Lay	
2020	She's the One	Carjacker	
2020	Hell Hole	Martin	
2021	Domino: Battle of the Bones	Twelvespeed	Released posthumously
2021	Welcome to Our World	Reggie The Mail Man	Released posthumously
2021	Money Is King	Detective Willams	Direct-to-video Released posthumously
2022	The Allnighter	Preston	Released posthumously
2022	Renegades	Apollo	Released posthumously
2025	Zootopia 2	Finnick	Released posthumously with unused audio recordings Final film role Dedicated in memory Cameo

=== Television ===
Year	Title	Role	Notes
1984	Webster	Football Player	Television debut role Episode: "You Can't Go Home Again"
1984–1987	1st & Ten	Otis	26 episodes Recurring cast: season 1 & 4
1986–1989	Matlock	Tiny Johnny Mack	3 episodes
1987	Perfect Strangers	Leroy	Episode: "Hello, Elaine"
1987	Warm Hearts, Cold Feet	Mack 'Truck' Jones	Television film
1987	Glory Years	Tony	Television film
1989	Hard Time on Planet Earth	John Henry	Episode: "The Hot Dog Man"
1989	Chameleons	Luther	Television film
1989	CBS Summer Playhouse	—N/a	Episode: "B-Men"
1991	The Fresh Prince of Bel-Air	Tiny	Episode: "72 Hours"
1992	The Boys	Bodybuilder	Television film Uncredited
1993	Renegade	Marvin Montgomery	Episode: "The Champ"
1993	Walker, Texas Ranger	Hicks	Episode: "Storm Warning"
1993	In the Heat of the Night	Tommy 'T.K.' Kendricks	Episode: "Every Man's Family"
1995	ER	Patient	Episode: "Feb 5, '95"
1995	Step by Step	Security Guard	Episode: "Where Have You Gone, Joe DiMaggio?"
1995	The Parent 'Hood	Leroy Moland	Episode: "The Bully Pulpit"
1995	Martin	Apollo	Episode: "Housekeeper From Hell"
1995	The Set-Up	Leon	Television film
1996	NYPD Blue	Bob	Episode: "Burnin' Love"
1996	WCW Monday Nitro	Z-Gangsta - The Dungeon of Doom	Episode: "Sullivan's Secret Weapons"
1996	Moesha	Security Guard #2	Episode: "A Concerted Effort: Part 1"
1997	Malcolm & Eddie	Zeus	Episode: "Lockdown"
1997	In the House	Mono	Episode: "Dial 'M' for Marion"
1997	The Jamie Foxx Show	Adam	Episode: "I Do, I Didn't"
1997	Sparks	Larry	Episode: "Won't You Be My Neighbor"
1997	L.A. Heat	A.K.	Episode: "Rap Sheet"
1997	USA High	Tony	Episode: "Mr. Tiffani"
1998	Damon	Alfonse	Episode: "My Brother's So-Called Life"
1999	Supreme Sanction	Lester	Television film
2001	Nash Bridges	Mr. Switch	Episode: "Blood Bots" & "Cat Fight"
2001	Enterprise	Klaang	Episode: "Broken Bow"
2005	All of Us	Bandito	Episode: "Creeping with the Enemy"
2005	The Rev	Tiny	Television film
2007	Saul of the Mole Men	John Henry	3 episodes Recurring cast
2008	Under One Roof	Punkin	Episode: "Release Therapy"
2008	Chocolate News	Otis 'Lighting' Jones	Episode: "Episode #1.8"
2009	Nite Tales: The Series	Wrestler	Episode: "Trapped"
2009	Monster Ark	Sergeant Major Gentry	Television film
2010	Laugh Track Mash-ups	Mr. Oppenheimer	Episode: "Ralphie n' Me"
2010–2013	Fish Hooks	Mr. Mussels	Voiceover Recurring cast 10 episodes
2011	Regular Show	Bobby	Voiceover Episode: "My Mom" & "See You There"
2012	FCU: Fact Checkers Unit	Tiny	Episode: "James Franco Is Preggers"
2012	Key & Peele	Driver	Episode: "Episode #2.7"
2012	Tiny Is My Girl	Sophie	2 episodes Main cast
2013	NTSF:SD:SUV::	Dallas	Episode: "TGI Murder"
2013	The Rev	Tiny Starr	4 episodes Main cast
2014	The Boondocks	Filbert Slowlove	Voiceover Episode: "The New Black"
2014	Taylor'd Problems	Big T	Episode: "Guess Who's Coming to Dinner?"
2014	Johnny Dynamo	Mo Lotto	4 episodes
2015	Comedy Bang! Bang!	Major Aikens	Episode: "Simon Helberg Wears a Sky Blue Button Down Jeans"
2015	Mann and Wife	Lieutenant Marshall	10 episodes Main cast: season 1
2015	On the Court	King Cain	3 episodes Recurring cast
2015	Da Jammies	Big Horace (voice)	Episode: "Will the Real Dolla..." & "3:10" Final television role

=== Music videos ===
Year	Title	Role	Artist
1986	"Man Size Love"	Tom Lister Jr.	Klymaxx
1989	"Happy"	Tom Lister Jr.	The Boys
1992	"Remember the Time"	Sentry	Michael Jackson
1995	"Friday"	Tom Lister Jr.	Ice Cube
1996	"Santeria"	Sancho	Sublime
1997	"Party Ain't a Party"	Tom Lister Jr.	Queen Pen
1997	"Luv 2 Luv Ya"	Tom Lister Jr.	Timbaland & Magoo
1999	"You Can Do It"	Tom Lister Jr.	Ice Cube
2003	"Many Men (Wish Death)"	50's Associates	50 Cent
2006	"Ridin'"	Tiny	Chamillionaire feat. Krayzie Bone
2007	"Put your Locs on"	Tom Lister Jr.	Down AKA Kilo
2011	"My World"	Tom Lister Jr.	Iggy Azalea
2012	"Good Girls, Bad Guys"	Tom Lister Jr.	Falling in Reverse
2012	"Show Love"	Police Officer	Chamillionaire feat. D.A.
2013	"So Blue"	Tom Lister Jr.	Akon
2014	"Touchdown (Remix)"	Tom Lister Jr.	O.T. Genasis feat. Busta Rhymes and French Montana
2020	"Poolside "	Tom Lister Jr.	Twenty Dollar Prophets

=== Video games ===
Year	Title	Role	Notes
2005	50 Cent: Bulletproof	Big Rig Gangbanger	Voiceover
2006	Scarface: The World Is Yours	Rocky T. - Babylon Club Doorman	Voiceover
2023	WWE 2K23	Zeus	Released posthumously
