= Rob Wright (writer) =

American TV writer, producer (active 1998– )

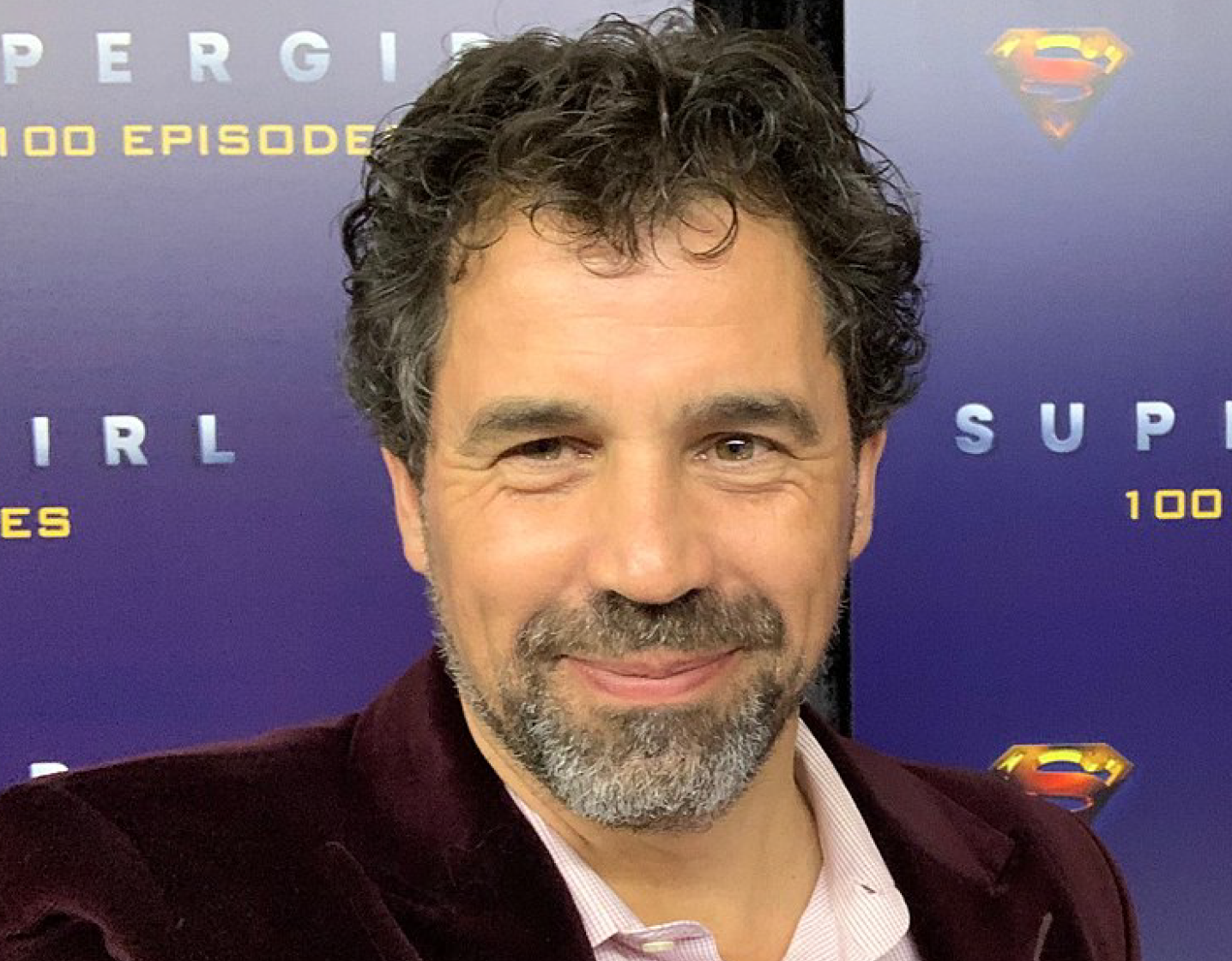
Wright in 2019

Rob Wright is an American television writer and producer. Starting with his work in 1998 as a story editor for the series The Magnificent Seven, his writing and producing credits include such titles as Lethal Weapon, The Librarians, Ash vs. Evil Dead, Grimm, Drop Dead Diva, Las Vegas, Crossing Jordan, Charmed, Law & Order, and Walker Texas Ranger.

A graduate of Yale University (BA) and USC's School of Cinema/Television (MFA), Wright has sold movies and created pilots, including the 2012/2013 drama The Mob Doctor, where he served as Executive Producer and Co-Showrunner.

From 2018 to 2022, Wright served as Executive Producer/Co-Showrunner, and wrote some (13) episodes, for the last three seasons of the series Supergirl.

He was born in New York City and raised in Los Angeles. As of 2021, he lived in Santa Monica, California, with his wife, television writer and producer Kristin Newman (including That 70’s Show, How I Met Your Mother, The Muppets), and their daughter and his two sons from a former marriage.
