= Most Wanted (1997 film) =

1997 American film

- Theatrical release poster
- Directed by: David Glenn Hogan
- Written by: Keenen Ivory Wayans
- Produced by: Eric L. Gold
- Starring: Keenen Ivory Wayans; Jon Voight; Jill Hennessy; Paul Sorvino; Robert Culp; Wolfgang Bodison; Simon Baker; Eric Roberts
- Cinematography: Marc Reshovsky
- Edited by: Michael J. Duthie; Mark Helfrich
- Music by: Paul Buckmaster
- Distributed by: New Line Cinema
- Release date: October 10, 1997
- Running time: 99 minutes
- Country: United States
- Language: English
- Budget: $25 million
- Box office: $11,838,218

Most Wanted is a 1997 American action thriller film directed by David Glenn Hogan, produced by Eric L. Gold and written by Keenen Ivory Wayans, who also starred in the lead role. The film co-stars Jon Voight, Jill Hennessy, Paul Sorvino, Robert Culp, Wolfgang Bodison, Simon Baker and Eric Roberts.

Most Wanted was released in the United States by New Line Cinema on October 10, 1997.

== Plot ==
In March 1991 during the Gulf War, United States Marine Gunnery Sergeant James Dunn, a sniper, received orders to eliminate an Iraqi courier. When Dunn discovered the courier was a ten-year-old boy, he refused, leading to a confrontation with his commanding officer who threatened to execute him for insubordination. In the ensuing struggle, the lieutenant was accidentally killed. As a result, Dunn was court-martialed, convicted of murder, and sent back to the United States to await his death sentence in a military stockade.

Five years after his initial capture, Dunn's transfer to death row is interrupted by a daring rescue and an unexpected offer: a place on a clandestine special operations team led by Lieutenant Colonel Grant Casey. This elite squad specializes in eliminating criminals beyond the reach of traditional justice. But Dunn's first assignment throws him into a viper's nest of deception: he is tasked with becoming the fall guy, the patsy framed for the assassination of the first lady.

The hunt for Dunn intensifies, complicated by the need to find Dr. Victoria Constantini, a witness who possesses crucial video evidence of the incident. Dunn locates her, and after rescuing her from the conspirators who bombed her home, she reluctantly agrees to help him. Meanwhile, the pair are relentlessly pursued by the military, under the command of General Adam Woodward, who is revealed to be part of the conspiracy, having impersonated the supposedly dead Lieutenant Colonel.

As Dunn and Constantini pursue the assassin, they uncover a conspiracy that reaches the highest levels of power. Their investigation implicates Donald Bickhart, the influential CEO of a pharmaceutical giant, and his experimental vaccine, CRC-13. They discover that Bickhart illegally tested the vaccine on soldiers, and that the First Lady was murdered because she was investigating these unethical trials.

As a smokescreen, Bickhart attempted to create a diversion by placing a $10 million bounty on Dunn's head, applicable to any citizen or officer, regardless of whether Dunn was brought in alive or dead. Meanwhile, Dunn finds a reliable ally in CIA Deputy Director Ken Rackmill, who believes in Dunn's innocence. Rackmill also suspects that a mole within the CIA collaborated with the conspirators responsible for framing Dunn. To save himself and Victoria, Dunn has to confront Woodward and his ruthless henchman, Col. Steve Braddock, and expose the truth before they become victims.

== Cast ==
- Keenen Ivory Wayans as Gunnery Sergeant James Dunn
- Jon Voight as General Adam Woodward / Lieutenant Colonel Grant Casey
- Jill Hennessy as Dr. Victoria Constantini
- Paul Sorvino as CIA Deputy Director Ken Rackmill
- Robert Culp as Dr. Donald Bickhart
- Wolfgang Bodison as Captain Steve Braddock
- Simon Baker-Denny as Stephen Barnes
- Eric Roberts as CIA Assistant Deputy Director John Spencer
- Michael Milhoan as SWAT Leader
- Lee de Broux as Commander Goldstein
- David Groh as TV Station Manager
- John Diehl as SWAT Captain
- Thomas G. Waites as Sergeant
- Michael Marich as Omega 3
- Dave Oliver as Lieutenant Scruggs
- Eddie Velez as Sergeant Peyton
- Donna Cherry as The First Lady
- Tucker Smallwood as Chief William Watson
- Michael D. Roberts as Homeless Man
- Amanda Kravat as Charlie
- Casey Lee as Randy
- Robert Kotecki as Marine Lieutenant
- L.V. Sanders as Gangbanger #1
- Tito Larriva as Gangbanger #2
- Martin Clark as Gulf War Colonel (uncredited)
- John Reidy as Tommy (uncredited)

== Reception ==
Most Wanted received negative reviews from critics. On the review aggregator website Rotten Tomatoes, 15% of 26 critics' reviews are positive. Audiences polled by CinemaScore gave the film an average grade of "C+" on an A+ to F scale.

Jon Voight was nominated for a Golden Raspberry Award for Worst Supporting Actor for his performance in both this film and U Turn, but lost the trophy to Dennis Rodman for Double Team.

== Soundtrack ==
Paul Buckmaster wrote the score for the film. Its soundtrack was released by Milan Records on 14 October 1997.
