= Members Only (TV series) =

- Genre: Comedy drama: Soap opera
- Created by: Susannah Grant
- Starring: Natalie Zea; Betsy Brandt; Michael Landes; Maria Canals-Barrera; Boris Kodjoe; Jaime Lee Kirchner; Luke Mitchell; Chris Conroy; Callie Hernandez; John Stamos
- Country of origin: United States
- Original language: English

Production
- Executive producers: Susannah Grant: Sarah Timberman; Carl Beverly
- Production companies: ABC Studios; CBS Television Studios; Timberman-Beverly Productions

Members Only is an unaired American comedy-drama television series created by Susannah Grant and starring Natalie Zea and John Stamos. The series was planned to air on ABC during the 2014–15 American television season, and was ordered straight-to-series with a 13-episode pickup. The upstairs-downstairs soap opera centers on the powerful and wealthy Holmes family, owners of Connecticut's most exclusive clubs. Members Only was canceled by ABC before its premiere.

== Cast and characters ==
The show features an ensemble cast, headed by Natalie Zea as lead character Mickey Holmes-Harris. The upstairs-downstairs drama also stars John Stamos as Randy, her villainous billionaire husband; Betsy Brandt as Leslie Holmes; Michael Landes as Malcolm; Chris Conroy as Forty Holmes, Mickey's 23-year-old brother; Boris Kodjoe as Deacon and Jaime Lee Kirchner as Deacon's wife Diana. On the downstairs side, Maria Canals-Barrera stars as Hilda, the house manager of the country club; Callie Hernandez as Ana, Hilda's daughter; and Luke Mitchell as Jesse, the new employee at the club.

Alongside regular cast members, the series has several recurring players, including John Cullum as Winston Holmes III, Mickey's father, and Rebecca Forsythe, Devyn Smith and Bailey Noble as Mickey and Randy's 17-year-old triplet-daughters.

=== Main ===
- Natalie Zea as Mickey Holmes-Harris
- John Stamos as Randy Harris
- Betsy Brandt as Leslie Holmes
- Chris Conroy as Forty Holmes
- Michael Landes as Malcolm Carr
- Boris Kodjoe as Deacon Rogers
- Jaime Lee Kirchner as Diana Rogers
- Maria Canals-Barrera as Hilda
- Callie Hernandez as Ana
- Luke Mitchell as Jesse Bartha

=== Recurring ===
- John Cullum as Winston Holmes III, Mickey's 79-year-old father
- Bailey Noble, Rebecca Forsythe and Devyn Smith as Mickey and Randy's 17-year-old triplets
- Samantha Logan as Imani Rogers
- Teddy Sears as Geddy
- Emjay Anthony as Evan

== Production ==
=== Development ===
On January 22, 2014, it was announced that ABC had given a straight-to-series 13-episode order to a drama series from the Academy Award-nominated writers David O. Russell and Susannah Grant. The script for the pilot episode was written by Grant. Sarah Timberman and Carl Beverly are also executive producers of show. Members Only was produced by CBS Television Studios and ABC Studios. Original title of the series was The Club. The series is described as an upstairs-downstairs soap opera set at a private country club. On February 26, 2014, it was announced that David O. Russell departed the series as executive producer.

The series began filming in New York City in September 2014. The first episode was directed by R. J. Cutler, who in 2012 directed the critically acclaimed pilot episode of the ABC drama series Nashville.

=== Casting ===
Callie Hernandez was the first regular member to be cast, being announced on February 26, 2014. Hernandez was cast as club worker Ana, who is secretly stealing and pawning nice items. On March 7, 2014 Canadian actor Chris Conroy was cast as Forty Holmes, who is recently back from rehab. On March 24, 2014 Breaking Bad co-star Betsy Brandt joined the cast as one of lead roles as Leslie Holmes. On next day Maria Canals-Barrera was cast as Hilda, the house manager of the country club and mother of Hernandez' character. On March 27, 2014, it was announced that Boris Kodjoe would play the role of Deacon, a former football player who is now a real estate broker in the club.

In July 2014 Luke Mitchell and Jaime Lee Kirchner were cast as an employee at the club named Jesse, and Diana, the wife of Deacon. On July 24, 2014, it was announced that Michael Landes was cast as one of the leads, playing Malcolm Carr, a recently widowed pediatrician and father who is close friend with Leslie. On August 4, 2014, it was announced that Natalie Zea would be playing the leading role of Mickey Holmes-Harris, a "queen bee" of the club and her family. On September 2, 2014, John Stamos joined the cast in the male lead role of Mickey's hedge-fund billionaire husband, Randy Harris.

=== Cancellation ===
Only the pilot episode was produced. The series was cancelled and it was never broadcast.

== See also ==
- List of television series canceled before airing an episode
- Members Only: Palm Beach (TV Series)
