= Hickey (film) =

- Directed by: Alex Grossman
- Written by: Alex Grossman
- Produced by: Lije Sarki; Michael Mackey; Chris Sacca; Josh Woods; Alex Grossman
- Starring: Troy Doherty; Flavia Watson; Raychel Diane Weiner; Zedrick Restauro; Alex Ashbaugh; Ross Mackenzie; Nicholas Azarian; Tommy "Tiny" Lister; Big Daddy Swolls
- Cinematography: Seamus Tierney
- Edited by: Brian Barr
- Music by: Gregory Reeves
- Production companies: Maxine Street Productions; Nut Bucket Films
- Distributed by: Gravitas Ventures
- Release dates: February 19, 2016 (Hollywood Reel Independent Film Festival); January 6, 2017 (United States)
- Running time: 85 minutes
- Country: United States
- Language: English
- Budget: <$200,000

Hickey is a 2016 American workplace teen comedy film directed by Alex Grossman. The film was released theatrically in the United States on January 6, 2017.

== Plot ==
As good at math as he is terrible with girls, Ryan Chess (Troy Doherty) has spent an entire summer pining away for his pretty and vivacious co-worker, Carly Alvarez (Flavia Watson). Just as the summer is coming to a close and he has worked up the courage to ask her out, he is shocked to learn the store is closing at the end of the day. And Carly is going to move away. Far away. With a full ride to MIT only a few months away, he knows he is nuts to care. But he does. And so he hatches a crazy plan to save the store by the end of the day and thereby make Carly fall in love with him, with the help of his best friend Jeremy (Zedrick Restauro), and his co-workers Ellen (Raychel Diane Weiner), and Gary (Ross Mackenzie). An uphill battle that gets even more difficult when the handsome and possibly sinister regional manager, Brady (Alex Ashbaugh), arrives. Brady says he is there to roll up his sleeves and pitch in with the sale, but Ryan suspects ulterior motives. And when he discovers that Carly and Brady were once romantically involved, he really loses his composure and chances of saving the store. Ultimately, Ryan relies on his big brain to save the store and out Brady as the villain he is. It is here that his confidence shines and Carly sees him for who he really is and falls in love with him.

== Cast ==
- Troy Doherty as Ryan Chess
- Flavia Watson as Carly Alvarez
- Raychel Diane Weiner as Ellen
- Zedrick Restauro as Jeremy
- Alex Ashbaugh as Brady Krane
- Ross Mackenzie as Gary
- Nicholas Azarian as Derek
- Janie Haddad Tompkins as Jane Chess
- Tommy "Tiny" Lister as Henry
- Jeremy Rowley as Sam
- Brennan Murray as Berger
- Big Daddy Swolls as Bobby

== Production ==
The film is writer/director Alex Grossman's first feature film, coming from a background of directing mostly commercials. He has described the budget as "less than 90% of the commercials [he] made before this movie," and revealed the budget of the film, from start to finish, was less than $200,000. Significant changes to the script were made weeks before production started due to location changes, and due to recasting of the Jane Chess character. The film's setting of Cy's Auto Sound & Stereo was meant to be similar to Fry's Electronics or Best Buy, but due to budget constraints, Grossman instead rewrote it as a small mom and pop type store, shot on location at Al and Ed's Car Stereo, a small southern California chain of car-centric stores. Director of Photography Seamus Tierney shot the film on a Red Epic, in 4K.

== Release ==
=== Film Festivals ===
The film premiered, and began its festivals run, at the 2016 Hollywood Reel Independent Film Festival, where it won the awards Best Director for Grossman, Best Supporting Actress for Raychel Diane Weiner, and Best Cinematography for Seamus Tierney. At South By Southwest 2016 Film Festival, the film was nominated for Excellence in Title Design under Title Designer Karin Fong, and Title Editor Caleb Woods. Other 2016 festivals it was an official selection for include the Beverly Hills Film Festival, Cinema At The Edge Film Festival, South Bay Film & Music Festival, and the LA Indie Film Festival.

=== Theatrical & Digital Releases ===
The film was released for a limited theatrical run in Los Angeles, starting January 6, 2017, exclusively at Arena Cinelounge in Hollywood. Gravitas Ventures distributed the film four days later on January 10, 2017, on multiple digital platforms including iTunes, Amazon, Google Play, Microsoft Store/Xbox, Vudu, YouTube, Vimeo, Video On Demand (via Charter Spectrum, DirecTV, and Verizon FiOS), and on DVD/Blu-ray.
