= Mercy (TV series) =

American television series

- Genre: Medical drama
- Created by: Liz Heldens
- Starring: Taylor Schilling; Michelle Trachtenberg; Jaime Lee Kirchner; James Tupper; Diego Klattenhoff; Guillermo Díaz; James LeGros
- Opening theme: "Better Get Right" by Devin Moore
- Composers: Wendy Melvoin; Lisa Coleman
- Country of origin: United States
- Original language: English
- No. of seasons: 1
- No. of episodes: 22

Production
- Executive producers: Gail Berman; Lloyd Braun; Liz Heldens; Gretchen J. Berg; Aaron Harberts; Jim Ellis; Adam Bernstein
- Producers: Jim Ellis; Matt Ward; James Bigwood
- Cinematography: William Rexer; Frank Prinzi; Dejan Georgevich; Russell Lee Fine; David M. Dunlap
- Editors: Scott Gamzon; Scott Boyd; Heather MacDougall; Greg D'Auria
- Running time: 41–43 minutes
- Production companies: BermanBraun; Selfish Mermaid; Universal Media Studios; Open 4 Business Productions

Original release
- Network: NBC
- Release: September 23, 2009 – May 12, 2010

Mercy is an American medical drama television series created by Liz Heldens, which aired on NBC from September 23, 2009, to May 12, 2010. The series initially aired on Wednesday at 8:00 pm (ET), as part of the 2009 fall season, but was pushed back to 9:00 pm in April.

On October 23, 2009, Mercy was picked up for a full 22-episode first season. On May 14, 2010, NBC cancelled the series after one season.

== Plot ==
Mercy is an ensemble drama set in the fictional Mercy Hospital in Jersey City, New Jersey. The show focuses on the lives of three nurses. Veronica Flanagan Callahan (Taylor Schilling) is a nurse who has just returned from a tour of duty in Iraq, while Sonia Jimenez (Jaime Lee Kirchner), her best friend, has become seriously involved with a police officer, and Chloe Payne (Michelle Trachtenberg) is a recent nursing graduate who is thrown into the world of nursing and is unprepared for what it entails.

== Cast ==
=== Main ===
- Taylor Schilling as Veronica Agnes Flanagan Callahan
- Michelle Trachtenberg as Chloe Payne
- Jaime Lee Kirchner as Sonia Jimenez
- James Tupper as Dr. Chris Sands
- Diego Klattenhoff as Mike Callahan
- Guillermo Díaz as Ángel García
- James LeGros as Dr. Dan Harris

(From left to right) Michelle Trachtenberg as Chloe, Taylor Schilling as Veronica, and Jaime Lee Kirchner as Sonia

=== Recurring ===
- David Call as Paul Kempton
- Delroy Lindo as Dr. Alfred Parks
- Kate Mulgrew as Jeannie Flanagan
- Peter Gerety as Jim Flanagan
- Michael Chernus as Ryan Flanagan
- Patch Darragh as Tim Flanagan
- Johnny Hopkins as Bobby Flanagan
- Charlie Semine as Nick Valentino
- K.K. Moggie as Dr. Gillian Jelani
- Margo Martindale as Helen Klowden
- Jill Flint as Simone Sands
- James Van Der Beek as Dr. Joe Briggs, new Chief of the ICU
- Mary Stuart Masterson as Dr. Denise Cabe
- Kelly Bishop as Lauren Kempton

== Development and production ==
NBC producer Jim Bigwood selected the warehouse at 10 Enterprise Avenue in Secaucus, New Jersey as the filming location for the series. The show occasionally also filmed inside a private residence in Weehawken, New Jersey. The production left New Jersey for New York in 2010, however, when New Jersey Governor Chris Christie suspended the tax credits for film and television production for the fiscal year 2011 to close budget gaps.

Some interior shots for the show were filmed in the unused Barnert Hospital in Paterson, New Jersey. in the old St Mary's Hospital in Passaic. Exterior shots of Mercy Hospital were taken of the back side of a public school on 4th street (between Newark Ave. and Colgate St.) in Jersey City, New Jersey. The exterior of Lucky 7's Bar was filmed at a location on the corner of 2nd and Coles Street in Jersey City. The interior of the bar was the Park Tavern located on West Side Avenue off Communipaw Avenue in Jersey City. The exterior shots of The Red Fox Saloon were filmed at the Monaghan House in South Amboy, New Jersey. The interior shots of the Saloon were filmed at Ted's Bar in the Morgan area of Sayreville, New Jersey.

Mercy was originally slated to begin midseason, but was moved to the fall after the premiere of Parenthood was pushed to 2010 due to production issues.

== Episodes ==
| No. | Title | Directed by | Written by | Original release date | US viewers (millions) |
|---|---|---|---|---|---|
| 1 | "Can We Get That Drink Now?" | Adam Bernstein | Liz Heldens | September 23, 2009 | 8.38 |
Veronica Callahan is a smart nurse who returns to Mercy Hospital after a year long tour of service in the Army. Veronica constantly disobeys orders to help her patients while also trying to save her marriage to her high school sweetheart Mike Callahan, but things become even more difficult for Veronica when the doctor she had an affair with, Dr. Chris Sands arrives at Mercy. Meanwhile, we also meet Veronica's best friend and also nurse colleague Sonia, who thinks she finally found the man of her life and also Chloe, a new nurse who just joined Mercy.
| 2 | "I Believe You Conrad" | Adam Kane | Liz Heldens | September 30, 2009 | 7.39 |
Veronica and Mike try moving back in together, to save their marriage. Back at Mercy Hospital, Veronica and Dr. Sands try to just be friends but it's not as easy as they thought. Meanwhile, Sonia fall for a hunky cop named Nick Valentino, who helps her with a Jane Doe case and Chloe tries to help a patient everyone has already given up on.
| 3 | "Hope You're Good, Smiley Face" | Andrew Bernstein | Toni Graphia | October 7, 2009 | 7.43 |
A night club fire puts a strain on Veronica when she tries to save the only survivor, but when the patient has to go into therapy, she helps Veronica realize she may need some help herself. Meanwhile, Chloe wants the respect of her coworkers so she decides it's time to change her style and attitude. Also, Sonia and one of the new doctors, butt heads over a patient while the nurses get confused when they see Dr. Harris with a mysterious beauty.
| 4 | "Pulling the Goalie" | Lawrence Trilling | Peter Elkoff | October 14, 2009 | 7.37 |
Mike and Veronica decide to start trying for a baby much to the dismay of Dr. Sands. While at the hospital, Veronica tries to help a homeless veteran get back on his feet also facing her issues from Iraq. On the other hand, Sonia finds the good and the bad from dating a cop while helping two patients who are in a love-hate relationship. Meanwhile, Chloe gives hope to a young cynical burn victim while thinking of taking her love for Dr. Sands to the next level.
| 5 | "You Lost Me With The Cinder Block" | Allan Arkush | Dan Dworkin & Jay Beattie | October 21, 2009 | 7.19 |
Veronica and Mike announce that they are trying to get pregnant while a pregnant woman and her unborn child are admitted to Mercy after a car accident. Sonia's new patient has a sleepwalking problem and Chloe spends the day on an ambulance and makes a discovery that will change the life of Dr. Harris, who has called a meeting to determine Veronica's future at Mercy Hospital.
| 6 | "The Last Thing I Said Was" | Lawrence Trilling | Gretchen J. Berg & Aaron Harberts | November 4, 2009 | 6.63 |
The truth about Veronica and Chris's affair emerges, which makes Veronica question whether or not to tell Mike. Sonia gets some relationship advice from a patient while her boyfriend Nick, who is undercover, goes missing. Meanwhile, Chloe's ex-boyfriend come to New Jersey to tell her he is getting married, much to her dismay. Guest stars Jerry Stiller, Anne Meara and Elisabeth Moss.
| 7 | "Destiny, Meet My Daughter, Veronica" | Martha Mitchell | Matt Ward | November 11, 2009 | 6.68 |
After Veronica and Dr. Sands affair is made public, Veronica and Mike reunite with a family emergency. Sonia's high school rival is admitted to Mercy Hospital, but Sonia find out her life isn't as perfect as she thought. Meanwhile, Chloe's relationship with a fireman starts to really heat up and Dr. Sand and Dr. Jelani start dating.
| 8 | "I'm Not That Kind of Girl" | Mike Listo | Veronica Becker & Sarah Kucserka | November 18, 2009 | 7.76 |
Veronica thinks she may be pregnant and that it might not be enough to save her marriage to Mike while she and Dr. Harris decide to work against death at the Hospital. Sonia's new patient is a beauty queen whose diagnosis will change her life forever, and Sonia will have to help her deal with it. Chloe finds out her new fireman boyfriend is married. Meanwhile, Dr. Sands and Dr. Jelani get even closer while organizing "Bike to Work Friday".
| 9 | "Some of Us Have Been to the Desert" | Duane Clark | Colleen McGuinness | December 9, 2009 | 7.01 |
Veronica decides to join a veterans support group to help with her Post Traumatic stress while also dealing with her father's Alzheimer's. Chloe is forced to deal with Dr. Harris after he injures himself from a fall in the Hospital while Sonia returns to the maternity ward and is assigned a 19-year-old pregnant girl who was going to give her baby up for adoption to two parents, but changes her mind.
| 10 | "I Saw This Pig and I Thought of You" | Ed Bianchi | Nichelle Tramble Spellman | January 6, 2010 | 7.30 |
Veronica's new patient who, had a near death experience in the operation room, launches him into a faith crisis while Veronica thinks that Mike has moved on and started dating someone new so she rounds up Sonia and Chloe and does some good old fashioned spying. Meanwhile, Sonia tries to help a mother and daughter after a car accident, but when the mother dies, Sonia discovers a secret that will change the little girls life forever and Chloe helps with a family feud when the children of her patient don't agree on a treatment for their father.
| 11 | "We're All Adults" | Darnell Martin | Dan Dworkin & Jay Beattie | January 13, 2010 | 5.85 |
Veronica's new patients are a group of promiscuous college students who are admitted to Mercy with meningitis, that also has a love triangle which has the Mercy Hospital staff comparing them to Veronica's love life. Meanwhile, Chloe's bride-to-be patient is admitted to Mercy thinking she just has a simple flu until she receives a more serious diagnosis. Sonia's hand transplant patient wants his new hand amputated when he finds out it belonged to a pedophile and Dr. Sands sister Simone come to New Jersey for a visit.
| 12 | "Wake Up, Bill" | Gloria Muzio | Peter Elkoff | January 20, 2010 | 5.86 |
Chloe's newlywed cancer patient undergoes risky surgery which leaves Chloe to help comfort the newlywed's husband. Meanwhile, a ten year coma patient named Bill, finally wakes up and decides to confront his love life which inspires Veronica to do the same with hers and Sonia gets a taste of the rich life when she has a wealthy and eccentric patient to look after.
| 13 | "Can We Talk About the Gigantic Elephant in the Ambulance?" | Seith Mann | Toni Graphi & Matt Ward | February 3, 2010 | 6.21 |
A new doctor arrives at Mercy Hospital, Dr. Joe Briggs, and already starts to make the bad books with the Hospitals staff. Meanwhile, Veronica and Dr. Sands have to set aside their problems, to save a woman and her frozen son who were found in the woods. After the death of Chloe's newlywed patient, Chloe has to help the newlyweds grieving husband leave the Hospital and Sonia continues as a private nurse for her wealthy patient.
| 14 | "I Have a Date" | Rick Wallace | Liz Heldens, Veronica Becker & Sarah Kucserka | February 10, 2010 | 6.78 |
Veronica and Dr. Sands finally go on their official first date on Valentines Day, but, before she can make it to the restaurant, Veronica is held hostage when the donut shop she goes to is robbed. Meanwhile, Dr. Joe Briggs re-assigns Chloe and Angel to the fast paced world of the E.R. Also, Sonia bonds with the son of her rich home care patient, and begins to question her relationship with Nick.
| 15 | "I Did Kill You, Didn't I?" | Phil Abraham | Dan Dworkin & Jay Beattie | March 3, 2010 | 6.04 |
Veronica is overwhelmed with PTSD after the doughnut shop shooting, and after a surprise guest arrives Veronica takes off leaving everyone worried. Meanwhile at Mercy, a bus bombing inundate the E.R. which, causes a fight between Dr. Briggs and Dr. Sand over the last available OR. Meanwhile, poor Chloe battles a hangover on her second day in the E.R, Sonia tries to keep her infidelity from Nick and Dr. Harris treats a patient which has a condition that keeps causing her to make inappropriate sexual advances.
| 16 | "I'm Fine" | David Straiton | Gretchen J. Berg & Aaron Harberts | March 10, 2010 | 6.33 |
Veronica wants to spend more time with Dr. Sands and she also wants to avoid her PTSD symptoms that were triggered by the robbery so she takes extra shifts at the Hospital, but, when she finds out what the parent of her young patient has been doing, her reaction shocks everyone even herself. Meanwhile, Sonia's home care patient wants to kill herself which causes Sonia to make a decision that could ruin her career while Chloe accompanies Dr. Briggs on a VIP house call which gives her a big surprise.
| 17 | "There is No Room For You on My Ass" | Andrew Bernstein | Peter Elkoff & Colleen McGuinness | March 17, 2010 | 5.55 |
Veronica treats an anorexic disorder patient who is just as good at denial as she is while Veronica's family decide to confront her after the St. Patrick's Day binge which make her consider seeing a therapist. Meanwhile, after helping Dr. Briggs with a heart attack patient, Chloe starts to soften up to him when she finds out why he became a doctor while Sonia still mourns the death of her home care patient.
| 18 | "Of Course I'm Not" | Wendey Stanzler | Story by : Matt Ward & Jeff Drayer; Teleplay by : Matt Ward | March 24, 2010 | 5.50 |
Veronica starts to deal with her PTSD and while Dr. Sands want to continue their relationship, Veronica sides against him in a patient dispute. Chloe and Dr. Harris help a football player who has a brain injury and Angel butts head with a eccentric E.R patient. Meanwhile, Sonia has to deal with two hipsters who are admitted to Mercy after an attempt to win a girl's heart goes awry, but, they help inspire Sonia to make romantic gesture to Nick.
| 19 | "There is No Superwoman" | Gloria Muzio | Toni Graphia & Nichelle Tramble Spellman | April 21, 2010 | 5.06 |
Veronica has another PTSD attack in a convenience store and continues her therapy with Dr. Cabe. Meanwhile, Chloe and her cute football player admirer track down a patient with a potentially fatal problem and the insurance company orders an unexpected autopsy on Sonia's home care patient, that may put her in danger.
| 20 | "We All Saw This Coming" | David Straiton | Veronica Becker & Sarah Kucserka | April 28, 2010 | 4.92 |
Several prisoners are admitted to Mercy Hospital after an attempt on someone's life starts a riot. Veronica starts to bond with her prisoner patient but is shocked to discover a secret he has been keeping, that puts his life in jeopardy. Chloe tries to convince her head injury boyfriend to get treatment before it's too late. Meanwhile, Sonia's patient is terrified to go back to prison which uncovers her fears of going to prison too, and Dr. Briggs has to make a decision that could put his career or life in danger.
| 21 | "Too Much Attitude and Not Enough Underwear" | Timothy Busfield | Peter Elkoff & Joe Sachs | May 5, 2010 | 3.92 |
Dr. Sands and Veronica's old boss from Iraq shows up at Mercy Hospital unexpectedly and asks Dr. Sands to take his place back in Iraq. Veronica asks Nick to help Sonia, when she has her old home care patient's son stalking her. Chloe is worried that her boyfriend is damaging his brain even more by playing football again against medical advice and struggles with the decision to tell his coach which could jeopardize her career and her relationship with her boyfriend. Meanwhile, Angel's friend is attacked and Dr. Briggs is worried his mafia connections had something to do with it while he has to deal with his former flame coming back into his life.
| 22 | "That Crazy Bitch Was Right" | Andrew Bernstein | Liz Heldens & Colleen McGuinness | May 12, 2010 | 4.01 |
Two boys and Veronica get trapped in an abandoned building, and Veronica is forced to amputate one of the boy's arm. Once freed from the building, Veronica finally moves out from her parents' house and into her own apartment with help from her ex-husband Mike. Back at Mercy Hospital, Chloe tries to convince the doctors at Mercy to do a risky surgery on her comatose boyfriend to save him from death, but, it's too late and Chloe assists in the surgery to harvest his organs. Sonia and Nick finally get back together while Sonia takes care of a psychic patient who tells her a few things about her future. Meanwhile, Dr. Sands leaves for Iraq with a medical relief group and Dr. Briggs tries to raise money to pay back his mafia debt before it's too late.

== Critical reception ==
Mercy received a score of 41 of 100 from the review aggregator Metacritic, indicating mixed reviews from critics. Matthew Gilbert, from The Boston Globe, referred to the show as "a bunch of played-out hospital clichés" and said it "follows the hospital melodrama blueprint way too closely." The Hollywood Reporter called the show "just another hospital soap opera" and "a lethal cocktail of virtually every medical drama ever seen on TV". Matt Roush of TV Guide wrote "Nurses deserve better than this ludicrous potboiler". Several critics referred to Mercy as a weak copy of Showtime's Nurse Jackie.

The show's writing was criticized as "twisting itself into a pretzel to provide ironies," and a review by Maureen Ryan of the Chicago Tribune states that "all the characters are so thinly drawn." Rob Owen of the Pittsburgh Post-Gazette, said the show "hits viewers over the head with its thesis statement that nurses are under-appreciated." Robert Bianco from USA Today stated that "remarkably good actors [are] going to waste here."

On the positive side, Rachel Ray of The Daily Telegraph, found the show "utterly enjoyable" and "marvelous television", while praising the "clicking pace, real-person dialogue, excellent writing, a fresh story line, and thoughtful acting". (Although the review was for a UK paper's online edition, the series did not air on British TV.) Noting an effort by NBC to find a replacement for the former standout ER, David Hinckley, from the New York Daily News, favorably compared the two shows and stated that Mercy "comes the closest yet to capturing that chemistry."

== Ratings ==
=== Seasonal ratings ===
| Season | Timeslot (EST) | Season Premiere | Season Finale | TV Season | Rank | Viewers (in millions) |
|---|---|---|---|---|---|---|
| 1 | Wednesday 8/7c (September 23, 2009 – April 21, 2010) Wednesday 9/8c (April 28, 2010 – May 12, 2010) | September 23, 2009 | May 12, 2010 | 2009–2010 | #76 | 6.33 |

== Home media ==
| Name | Region 1 | Region 2 | Region 4 | Discs |
|---|---|---|---|---|
| The Complete Series | August 3, 2010 | —N/a | September 29, 2010 | 5 |
