= Susannah Grant =

American screenwriter (born 1963)

- Born: January 4, 1963 (age 63); New York City, U.S.
- Occupations: Screenwriter, producer, director
- Spouse: Christopher Henrikson (m. 1995)
- Children: 2

Susannah Grant (born January 4, 1963) is an American screenwriter, director, and producer.

== Early life ==
Grant was born in New York City. She studied at Amherst College and attended the AFI Conservatory. She is also a Miss Porter's School alumna as well as an Amherst College alumna, having graduated in 1984. She later was accepted to the American Film Institute and received the Nicholl Fellowship in screenwriting.

== Career ==
From 1994 to 1997, she worked on television as the producer and major writer of the Fox drama series Party of Five. She wrote the screenplays for Ever After, Erin Brockovich, directed by Steven Soderbergh, 28 Days, and Disney's Pocahontas. For Erin Brockovich she received an Oscar nomination for Best Original Screenplay in 2001 at the 73rd Academy Awards.

After her Academy Award nomination, Grant adapted In Her Shoes and Charlotte's Web for the screen and wrote and directed Catch and Release, starring Jennifer Garner and Timothy Olyphant. Grant was featured in The Dialogue.

Grant created and produced the CBS series A Gifted Man in 2011. She received the Valentine Davies Award in 2011. In September 2013, Grant delivered a screenwriting lecture as part of the BAFTA and BFI Screenwriters' Lecture Series. In 2014, Grant created the ABC drama series Members Only for the 2014–15 American television season.

In 2019, Grant co-created, wrote and directed the Netflix miniseries Unbelievable, starring Kaitlyn Dever and Toni Collette, adapted from real events. More recently, she signed a first look deal with Lionsgate Television. Grant wrote and directed the Netflix film Lonely Planet starring Laura Dern and Liam Hemsworth.

== Personal life ==
Grant has been married to Christopher Henrikson since 1995, and they have two children.

== Filmography ==
=== Film ===
Year	Title	Director	Writer
1995	Pocahontas	No	Yes
1998	Ever After	No	Yes
2000	28 Days	No	Yes
2000	Erin Brockovich	No	Yes
2005	In Her Shoes	No	Yes
2006	Catch and Release	Yes	Yes
2006	Charlotte's Web	No	Yes
2009	The Soloist	No	Yes
2016	The 5th Wave	No	Yes
2024	Lonely Planet	Yes	Yes

=== Television ===
Year	Title	Credited as				Notes
Year	Title	Director	Writer	Executive Producer	Creator	Notes
1994–1997	Party of Five	Yes	Yes	Yes	No	63 episodes
2011–2012	A Gifted Man	No	Yes	Yes	Yes	16 episodes
2014	Members Only	No	Yes	Yes	Yes	Unaired
2016	Confirmation	No	Yes	Yes	No	TV movie
2019	Unbelievable	Yes	Yes	Yes	Yes	Miniseries
2022	Fleishman Is in Trouble	No	No	Yes	No	Miniseries
2023	Lessons in Chemistry	No	No	Yes	No	Miniseries
TBA	Discretion	No	No	Yes	No	

== Awards and nominations ==
Year	Award	Category	Title	Result
2000	Las Vegas Film Critics Society	Best Screenplay	Erin Brockovich	Won
2000	PEN Center USA	Literary Award for Best Screenplay	Erin Brockovich	Won
2000	Academy Awards	Best Original Screenplay	Erin Brockovich	Nominated
2000	BAFTA Awards	Best Original Screenplay	Erin Brockovich	Nominated
2000	Writers Guild of America	Best Original Screenplay	Erin Brockovich	Nominated
2000	Satellite Awards	Best Original Screenplay	Erin Brockovich	Nominated
2000	Edgar Award	Best Motion Picture	Erin Brockovich	Nominated
