= Drop Dead Diva =

2009 American legal comedy-drama television series

- Genre: Comedy drama; Fantasy; Legal drama
- Created by: Josh Berman
- Starring: Brooke Elliott; Margaret Cho; April Bowlby; Kate Levering; Jackson Hurst; Josh Stamberg; Ben Feldman; Lex Medlin; Carter MacIntyre; Justin Deeley
- Composers: Scott Starrett; Danny Lux
- Country of origin: United States
- Original language: English
- No. of seasons: 6
- No. of episodes: 78 (list of episodes)

Production
- Executive producers: Josh Berman; Alex Taub; Craig Zadan; Neil Meron; Robert J. Wilson; David Petrarca
- Producers: Robert J. Wilson; Dauri Chase; Jeffrey Lippman; David Feige; Anne M. Uemura; Sarah Rath; Katrin L. Goodson
- Production locations: Atlanta, Georgia
- Editors: Tirsa Hackshaw; Augie Hess; John Murray; Thomas R. Moore; Noah Pontell; J. Scott Harvey; Jim Page
- Camera setup: Single-camera
- Running time: 42–43 minutes
- Production companies: Osprey Productions; Post Road Productions (seasons 3–4); Sony Pictures Television

Original release
- Network: Lifetime
- Release: July 12, 2009 – June 22, 2014

Drop Dead Diva is an American legal comedy-drama/fantasy television series that aired on Lifetime from July 12, 2009, to June 22, 2014. The series was created by Josh Berman and produced by Sony Pictures Television. It stars Brooke Elliott as Jane, a plus-sized lawyer whose body is inhabited by the soul of a fashion model.

In January 2013, Lifetime canceled the series after its fourth season. That March, the network reversed its decision, renewing the series for a fifth season that premiered in June 2013. In October 2013, Lifetime renewed the series for a sixth and final season.

== Plot ==
The series revolves around Deborah "Deb" Dobkins (played by Brooke D'Orsay), a vapid model who is killed in a car crash on the way to an audition for The Price Is Right. As her soul enters the gates of Heaven, she finds herself being judged by a gatekeeper named Fred (Ben Feldman). As a result of her shallowness, Fred declares her a "zero-zero", since she has performed zero good deeds and zero bad deeds during her time on Earth. While he is distracted, Deb presses the "return" key before Fred can stop her and is brought back to life in the body of a recently deceased lawyer named Jane Bingum (Brooke Elliott), who died protecting her boss Jay Parker (Josh Stamberg) from a shooter.

Jane is the complete opposite of Deb; she is brilliant, hard-working, charitable, and plus-sized. Deb finds that Jane also works in the same law firm, Harrison-Parker, as Deb's fiancé Grayson Kent (Jackson Hurst). After immediately telling her best friend Stacy Barrett (April Bowlby) of her predicament, Deb prepares herself to tell Grayson the truth about her new body. However, Fred's assignment as Deb's guardian angel serves as punishment for letting her escape Heaven. His purpose on Earth is to prevent Deb from telling Grayson the truth and insisting that no one else can know that she is really Deb in Jane's body.

Deb struggles to learn more about her inherited life, learning lessons about self-esteem and personal acceptance. Eventually, the real Jane Bingum (played by Natalie Hall) reappears in another person's body after she also pressed the return key, leading Deb to finally reveal the truth to Grayson, now one of Jane's closest friends. Grayson, after grieving and moving on from Deb's passing, becomes conflicted but finally accepts Deb in her new body, saying that he wants her to be herself and no one else.

In addition to working with Grayson at the law firm, Deb (as Jane) also contends with her professional rival, Kim Kaswell (Kate Levering), who briefly dates Grayson after Deb's passing.

== Cast and characters ==
=== Main cast ===
- Brooke Elliott as Jane Bingum (inhabited by Deb Dobkins), a brilliant, hardworking attorney with a flair for fashion.
- Margaret Cho as Teri Lee, Jane's assistant.
- April Bowlby as Stacy Barrett, Jane's/Deb's longtime best friend and roommate, and the first human who learns that Jane is inhabited by Deb.
- Kate Levering as Kim Kaswell, Jane's coworker and frenemy.
- Jackson Hurst as Grayson Kent, Jane's closest colleague and Deb's former boyfriend, who later becomes the second human to learn about Deb inhabiting Jane's body.
- Josh Stamberg as Jay Parker (seasons 1–4), Jane's former boss.
- Lex Medlin as Owen French (seasons 4–6, recurring season 3), Jane's ex-fiancé, later Stacy's fiancé, and father of her twins; he was a judge who later becomes a partner in the firm.
- Carter MacIntyre as Luke Daniels (season 4, guest season 5), Jane/Deb's second guardian angel.
- Justin Deeley as Paul (seasons 5–6), Jane/Deb's third and current guardian angel, and later Grayson/Ian's guardian angel.
- Ben Feldman as Fred (seasons 2–3 (Note: Ben Feldman is a series regular in seasons 2 & 3 but is credited as a special guest star.), recurring season 1, special guest seasons 4 & 6), Jane/Deb's original guardian angel.

=== Recurring cast ===
- Brooke D'Orsay as the original Deb Dobkins (seasons 1–3)
- Paula Abdul as herself, as Judge Paula Abdul (seasons 1–3)
- Rosie O'Donnell as Judge Madeline Summers (seasons 1–2)
- Sharon Lawrence as Bobbi Dobkins (seasons 1–5)
- Faith Prince as Elaine Bingum (seasons 1–5)
- Jaime Ray Newman as Vanessa Hemmings (seasons 2–3 & 5)
- Marcus Lyle Brown as ADA Paul Saginaw (seasons 2–6)
- Brandy Norwood as Elisa Shayne (seasons 3–4)
- Kim Kardashian as Nikki LePree (season 4)
- Natalie Hall as Brittney (inhabited by the real Jane Bingum) (season 5)
- Annie Ilonzeh as Nicole (season 5)
- Jeffrey Pierce as Ian Holt (inhabited by Grayson) (season 6)
- Jeff Rose as Doug Resnick (seasons 2–6)
- Kwajalyn Brown as Judge Tara Flint (seasons 5–6)

=== Guest stars ===
Many well known actors and celebrities have made guest appearances on the show. Among them are: Quinton Aaron, Candice King, Clay Aiken, Louis van Amstel, Jake T. Austin, Diedrich Bader, Lance Bass, Amanda Bearse, Corbin Bleu, Delta Burke, Danielle Campbell, Bruce Davison, David Denman, Seamus Dever, Patty Duke, Jorja Fox, Vivica A. Fox, Robin Givens, Tony Goldwyn, Elliott Gould, Nancy Grace, Kathy Griffin, Tim Gunn, Jasmine Guy, Deidre Hall, Valerie Harper, Gregory Harrison, Natasha Henstridge, Howard Hesseman, Star Jones, Kim Kardashian, Rami Kashou, Ricki Lake, Sharon Lawrence, Mario Lopez, Chad Lowe, MacKenzie Mauzy, Abby Lee Miller, Liza Minnelli, Tyler Jacob Moore, Mark Moses, Mary Mouser, Kathy Najimy, Kelly Osbourne, Jake Pavelka, Teri Polo, Melissa Ponzio, Susan May Pratt, John Ratzenberger, Crystal Reed, LeAnn Rimes, Joan Rivers, Romy Rosemont, Olesya Rulin, Cybill Shepherd, Jamie-Lynn Sigler, James Snyder, Leelee Sobieski, Patti Stanger, Chelsea Staub, Wanda Sykes, Lee Tergesen, Jennifer Tilly, Gina Torres, Steve Valentine, Nia Vardalos, Dylan Walsh, Barry Watson, Serena Williams, Wendy Williams, Jeff Wincott, Chuck Woolery, Nick Zano, and Maddie Ziegler.

== Development and production ==
=== Conception ===
Drop Dead Diva was originally developed at Fox, but ultimately Lifetime stepped in and ordered the script to pilot. According to Berman, "It's a cross between Freaky Friday and Heaven Can Wait", calling it a "life-affirming dramedy". He added that in Hollywood, "beauty has been defined as size 2 and under 25; hopefully we can help redefine the paradigm."

=== Filming ===
Though the background setting for Drop Dead Diva is set in Los Angeles, the series is filmed in Peachtree City, Georgia, and Senoia, Georgia, with principal photography taking place in a studio contained in a large hangar at Atlanta Regional Airport, and outdoor locations shot around the town. Filming originally took place in Georgia for tax incentives.

=== Cancellation and revival ===
On January 15, 2013, Lifetime announced that despite the cliffhanger at the end of season four, that would be the final season of Drop Dead Diva. Lifetime's decision to cancel the expensive drama came after the cable network approached producer Sony Pictures Television for cost-cutting options to continue with the series. Despite the cancellation, ratings for the season-four finale marked a season high, with 2.76 million viewers. One month and a half after Lifetime cancelled the series, the cable network signed a deal with the series' production company, Sony Pictures Television, to bring the show back for a fifth season.

On October 25, 2013, Lifetime renewed the series for a sixth and final season, which premiered on March 23, 2014, and concluded on June 22, 2014.

== Episodes ==
Season	Episodes	Originally released	
Season	Episodes	First released	Last released
1	13	July 12, 2009	October 11, 2009
2	13	June 6, 2010	August 29, 2010
3	13	June 19, 2011	September 25, 2011
4	13	June 3, 2012	September 9, 2012
5	13	June 23, 2013	November 3, 2013
6	13	March 23, 2014	June 22, 2014

== Reception ==
=== Critical response ===
Drop Dead Diva holds a score of 68 out of 100 on Metacritic, based on 12 reviews by critics for the first season. Writing for the Los Angeles Times, Mary McNamara praised Josh Berman for the series, saying: "Berman produces a deft juggling trick of heart and humor, balancing Deb's shallowness with some solid common sense and Jane's inadequate self esteem with kindness and legal brilliance." She added describing the series itself as "a lot of fun to watch". The New York Times Alessandra Stanley commented: "while the presumption that a woman can be either brainy or beautiful, or in this case, good or thin, but not both, is a bit primitive, the series has humor and charm beneath its facile message, in large part (no disrespect intended) to a subtle, winning performance by Ms. Elliott." Brian Lowry of Variety was less enthusiastic about the series, commenting: "Granted, there's much to be said for a program featuring a smart, plus-sized heroine in today's rail-thin TV world, but "Diva" under nourishes its premise amid a sea of legal-procedural banalities." He went on to state that "the epiphanies come a little too easily, and the legal triumphs predicated on knowledge of posing are a little too "Legally Blonde."" New York Daily News David Hinckley, gave the premiere two out of five stars, describing Drop Dead Diva as "still feeling like a pasted-together assortment of ideas and plot lines from productions past." However, on a more positive note he stated that "this could turn out to be the TV equivalent of a good old-fashioned summer beach read."

USA Today called Brooke Elliott "a full-blown instant star and delight who makes you wonder where she has been hiding herself." Adding: "one of the many wonderful things about Elliott's performance is that they are two people. Her transitions — like scrunching up her eyes when "Jane" is thinking, then opening them in wide, thrilled shock when "Deb" realizes that "Jane" has had a thought — are clear without seeming forced. There's pain and pleasure in the situation for both women, and Elliott makes each emotion ring true." Boston Globe also praised Elliott's performance as Jane Bingum, stating that "As Deb-inside-Jane, Elliott does a great job portraying pathos, absurd disappointment, and wide-eyed discovery."

=== Ratings ===
The show's premiere scored a 1.6 overall and more than 2.8 million viewers tuning in. Drop Dead Diva scored its highest ratings ever among women 18–49 (2.0), a 25% increase over its season-to-date average, and women 25–54 (2.3), a 28% increase over its season-to-date average.

The show aired on the Nine Network in Australia, but failed to achieve high ratings for the channel and was subsequently dropped in early September, then the following week began airing the series starting with the first episode again on Nine's digital channel GO!. In October 2011, new episodes of Drop Dead Diva moved to another of Nine's digital channels GEM, but episodes have been shown sporadically.

In the UK, the show aired on Living and premiered on April 1, 2010, to 206,000 viewers, being the seventh-most watched broadcast of the week on Living. An additional 129,000 viewers watched the premiere on Living's one-hour timeshift service. The second season premiered on September 7. The third season started airing in September 2011 on the revamped Sky Living. With the DVD release of the second season, in Region 2 is to be released in November over a year after its airing. After Sky Living dropped the show from their schedule, season four was made available to Netflix users in the UK and Ireland.

Season	Timeslot (EST)	Number of episodes	Premiere			Finale			Average (in millions)
Season	Timeslot (EST)	Number of episodes	Date	Viewers (millions)	18–49 Rating	Date	Viewers (millions)	18–49 Rating	Average (in millions)
1	Sunday 9:00 pm	13	July 12, 2009	2.80	0.8	October 11, 2009	2.79	0.9	2.84
2	Sunday 9:00 pm	13	June 6, 2010	3.12	1.0	August 29, 2010	2.61	0.9	2.59
3	Sunday 9:00 pm	13	June 19, 2011	2.86	1.0	September 25, 2011	2.12	0.7	2.26
4	Sunday 9:00 pm	13	June 3, 2012	2.30	0.8	September 9, 2012	2.76	0.9	2.30
5	Sunday 9:00 pm	13	June 23, 2013	2.15	0.7	November 3, 2013	1.78	0.5	1.99
6	Sunday 9:00 pm	13	March 23, 2014	1.11	0.3	June 22, 2014	1.66	0.4	1.36

=== Awards and nominations ===
Awards and nominations for Drop Dead Diva
Year	Award	Category	Nominee(s)	Result
2009	Satellite Awards	Best Actress in a Series, Comedy or Musical	Brooke Elliott	Nominated
2010	Image Award	Outstanding Directing in a Comedy Series	Michael Schultz – For episode "Second Chances"	Nominated
2010	NAMIC Vision Awards	Best Performance Comedy	Margaret Cho	Nominated
2011	GLAAD Media Award	Outstanding Individual Episode (in a series without a regular LGBT character)	For episode "Queen of Mean"	Nominated
2011	Prism Awards	Performance in a Comedy Series	Brooke Elliott	Nominated
2011	Prism Awards	Performance in a Comedy Series	Faith Prince	Nominated
2012	GLAAD Media Award	Outstanding Individual Episode (in a series without a regular LGBT character)	For episode "Prom" (They were awarded this as a part of tie with the episode "Beards" from Hot in Cleveland)	Won
2012	Image Award	Outstanding Directing in a Comedy Series	Kevin Hooks – For episode "Mother's Day"	Nominated
2014	GLAAD Media Award	Outstanding Individual Episode (in a series without a regular LGBT character)	For episode "Secret Lives"	Nominated
2015	GLAAD Media Award	Outstanding Individual Episode (in a series without a regular LGBT character)	For episode "Identity Crisis"	Won

== Home media ==
All six seasons were released on DVD by Sony Pictures Home Entertainment while the complete series' DVD set was released through Mill Creek Entertainment on June 4, 2019.

DVD name	Region 1 Release Date	Region 2 Release Date	Region 4 Release Date	Ep #	Discs	Additional information
Season 1	June 1, 2010	June 28, 2010	June 2, 2010	13	3	Dreamisodes, Deleted Scenes, Rosie's Rap, Dropping in with Drop Dead Diva, and Cho in Tell.
Season 2	May 3, 2011	TBA	TBA	13	3	Drop Dead Dishing: The Cast and Crew on Season 2, A Look Ahead to Season 2, Is This Her Future?, It Wasn't a Meeting, Tell the Judge You Saw a Ghost, There's a Little Diva in all of Us!, Just Hear Us Out, Begin Again Music Video, and Thunder From Down Under.
Season 3	May 29, 2012	TBA	TBA	13	3	TBA
Season 4	June 18, 2013	TBA	TBA	13	3	Outtakes and Deleted Scenes
Season 5	June 3, 2014	TBA	TBA	13	3	TBA
Season 6	April 7, 2015	TBA	TBA	13	3	TBA

== Soundtrack ==
A soundtrack for Drop Dead Diva was released on June 1, 2010, by Madison Gate Records. It is titled Drop Dead Diva (Music from the Original Television Series). The track list includes music by Brooke Elliott, Margaret Cho, Ben Feldman, Scott Starrett, Confetti, Becca Jones, Platinum Pied Pipers, Lil' Wendy, Madi Diaz, Dri, Katie Herzig, Malbec and Joshua Morrison.

== Remakes ==
In 2017, South Korean TV network MBC announced that it will broadcast a local remake of the series, titled Goddess of the Court (Korean: 법정의 여신; RR: Beopjeongui yeosin). Jointly produced by Sony Pictures Television and local production company Redwoods (the company behind the hit 2015–2016 TV series Six Flying Dragons), it is planned for broadcast on the network's Wednesday–Thursday primetime slot in early 2018. SPT also plans to broadcast the series on its owned-and-operated channels across 160 countries, including Sony One.

=== Drop Dead Dave ===
In September 2021, it was reported that a reboot of the series titled Drop Dead Dave was in development at CBS. It was to be produced by Osprey Production and Sony Pictures Television, with Berman returning as writer and executive producer and Jamie Babbit as director. The new series would have incorporated a gender-swap premise, with the main character, Dave, having his soul transferred into a lawyer named Rita following a freak accident. CBS however opted to not pick up the series.

=== Ligeramente diva ===
In May 2022, Sony Pictures Television Latin America announced that production had begun on a Spanish-language remake of the series, titled Ligeramente diva, with Estefanía Villarreal in the lead role. The series was released on Mercado Play on 18 June 2024.

== See also ==
- Body swap appearances in media
