= List of people from Orange County, California =

This is a list of notable past and present residents of Orange County.

== Athletics ==
- Corey Ashe, soccer player
- Amanda Beard, Olympic swimmer
- Shane Bieber, baseball player
- Kobe Bryant, NBA player (born in Pennsylvania)
- Gary Carter, MLB player, member of Hall of Fame
- Michael Chang, professional tennis player (born in New Jersey)
- Sasha Cohen, figure skater
- Allen Craig, baseball player
- Isaac Curtis, professional football player
- Sam Darnold, professional football player
- Lindsay Davenport, professional tennis player
- Steve Deberg, professional football player (born in Oakland)
- Phil Dent, professional tennis player
- Taylor Dent, professional tennis player
- Super Dragon, professional wrestler
- Janet Evans, swimmer
- Jim Fassel, professional football coach
- Julie Foudy, soccer player
- Kyle Harrison (born 2001), baseball pitcher for the San Francisco Giants
- Jaylinn Hawkins, professional football player
- Matthew Hoppe, professional soccer player
- Phil Hughes, baseball player
- Nyjah Huston, professional skateboarder
- Kevin Jepsen, baseball player
- Samoa Joe, multi-time world heavyweight professional wrestling champion
- Magic Johnson, former NBA player
- Stanley Johnson, NBA player
- Jürgen Klinsmann, player and coach for Germany's national football (soccer) team
- Mark Kotsay, baseball player
- Iris Kyle, 10-time overall Ms. Olympia professional bodybuilder
- Adam LaRoche, Washington Nationals first baseman
- Tommy Lasorda, Hall of Fame manager of Los Angeles Dodgers (born in Pennsylvania)
- Jason Lee, professional skateboarder and actor
- Matt Leinart, professional football player
- Michael Lorenzen, professional baseball player
- Mark McGwire, baseball player and coach
- Tito Ortiz, mixed martial arts fighter
- Carson Palmer, professional football player
- Aaron Peirsol, swimmer
- Sara Ramirez, gymnast
- Dennis Rodman, basketball player (born in New Jersey)
- Elizabeth Ryan, tennis player
- Mark Sanchez, USC and NFL quarterback
- Monte Scheinblum, 1992 U.S. National Long Driving Champion
- Larry Sherry, baseball pitcher, 1959 World Series MVP
- Ed Templeton, professional skateboarder and manufacturer
- Garry Templeton, professional baseball player
- Matt Treanor, baseball player
- Peter Vidmar, gymnast
- C. J. Wilson, baseball player
- Tiger Woods, professional golfer

== Business ==
- George Argyros, diplomat, real estate investor
- Jonas Bevacqua, co-founder of Lifted Research Group
- Donald Bren, chairman of the Irvine Company
- Dan Caldwell, co-founder of Tapout
- Christopher Cox, U.S. Securities and Exchange Commission chairman
- Mark Cuban, businessman, investor, owner of the Dallas Mavericks
- Walt Disney, creator of Disneyland theme park (born in Illinois)
- Lucy Dunn, CEO of Orange County Business Council
- Ray Grainger, founder of Mavenlink
- Justin Hartfield, co-founder of Weedmaps
- Reza Jahangiri, CEO of American Advisors Group
- James Jannard, businessman, designer and founder of Oakley Inc.
- Paul Merage, co-founder of Chef America Inc.
- Arturo Moreno, businessman
- Michael Morhaime, businessman, co-founder of Blizzard Entertainment
- Henry Nicholas, CEO of Broadcom Corporation
- Igor Olenicoff, real estate developer
- Rodney Sacks, businessman, chairman, and CEO of Monster Beverage
- Henry Samueli, owner of the Anaheim Ducks
- Hilton Schlosberg, businessman
- Henry Segerstrom, entrepreneur
- Vinny Smith, founder of Toba Capital
- Lynsi Snyder, owner of In-N-Out Burger
- Dean Stoecker, CEO of Alteryx
- David Sun, founder of Kingston Technology
- William Wang, founder and CEO of Vizio

== Literature ==
- Gregory Benford, science fiction author and astrophysicist
- James P. Blaylock, fantasy author
- Philip K. Dick, author and futurist (born in Illinois)
- Jeremy Gable, playwright
- Dean Koontz, horror author (born in Pennsylvania)
- Corrie ten Boom, Holocaust survivor, author, lecturer
- Toni Turner, author

== Movies, television and media ==
- Scott Aukerman, comedian, writer, host of the Comedy Bang Bang podcast and TV show
- Gene Autry, singer-actor, longtime owner of Angels baseball team (born in Texas)
- Tara Lynne Barr, actress
- Jimmy Bennett, actor
- Nate Berkus, designer and TV personality
- Joey Bishop, comedian and actor (born in Pennsylvania)
- Marlon Brando, film and stage actor (born in Nebraska)
- James Cameron, film director (born in Canada)
- Marc Cherry, creator and executive producer of Desperate Housewives
- Lauren Conrad, TV personality (The Hills)
- Kevin Costner, actor, director
- Valorie Curry, actress
- Heather Dubrow, actress and TV personality on The Real Housewives of Orange County (born in New York)
- Terry Dubrow, plastic surgeon and star of Botched (born in Los Angeles)
- Kyle Echarri, Filipino actor
- Susan Egan, actress, singer
- Will Ferrell, comedian and actor
- Jere Fields, actress
- Yasmeen Fletcher, actress and musician
- Cuba Gooding Jr, actor
- Vicki Gunvalson, TV personality, The Real Housewives of Orange County (born in Chicago)
- Stephen Hillenburg, creator of Spongebob Squarepants (born in Oklahoma)
- Mitch Hurwitz, writer, creator of Arrested Development
- Tamra Judge, TV personality, The Real Housewives of Orange County (born in Glendora near Los Angeles)
- Diane Keaton, actress and author (born in Los Angeles)
- Jeana Keough, TV personality on The Real Housewives of Orange County (born in Milwaukee)
- Devinn Lane, porn star
- Penny Marshall, actress and director (born in New York)
- Steve Martin, comedian, actor, author, musician (born in Texas)
- Jennette McCurdy, actress and singer
- Scott McGehee, filmmaker
- Tarek El Moussa, TV personality, Flip or Flop
- Donny Osmond, singer and actor (born in Utah)
- Michelle Pfeiffer, actress
- Shelby Rabara, actress
- Jessica Rey, actress
- Mark Rober, mechanical-engineer, YouTube personality
- Jim Rome, sports radio personality
- Mirela Rupic, costume designer
- Keri Russell, actress
- Emily Skinner, actress
- Roger Craig Smith, voice actor
- John Stamos, actor and musician
- Jeffree Star, internet celebrity
- Kristy Swanson, actress
- Milo Ventimiglia, actor
- John Wayne, iconic film actor; Orange County airport named for him (born in Iowa)

== Music ==
- Adolescents, rock band
- Agent Orange, rock band
- Avenged Sevenfold, rock band
- Banks, singer
- Aloe Blacc, singer
- Jackson Browne, musician
- Jeff Buckley, singer, songwriter, musician
- Rebecca Black, singer, songwriter, YouTuber, DJ
- Pamela Courson, wife of Doors frontman Jim Morrison
- Dick Dale, musician
- Leo Fender, inventor of the solid-body electric guitar
- The Garden, band composed of twins Wyatt and Fletcher Shears
- Bobby Hatfield, singer, The Righteous Brothers (born in Wisconsin)
- Dexter Holland, musician and singer (The Offspring)
- Kiev, indie rock band
- Lee Soon-kyu (English name: Susan Soonkyu Lee), singer and member of Girls' Generation
- Crystal Lewis, Christian singer
- Lit, rock band
- Mark McGrath, lead singer of Sugar Ray
- Mike Ness, pioneer in O.C. punk music (Social Distortion)
- Terri Nunn, singer, actress
- Dan O'Mahony, singer, author, activist, journalist
- Gwen Stefani, lead singer of No Doubt
- Jeff Timmons, founder, singer and producer of 98 Degrees
- Lisa Tucker, singer
- Brian Tyler, composer, conductor, arranger and producer
- Noah Urrea, singer, actor and member of Now United
- Scott Weiland, lead singer of Stone Temple Pilots and Velvet Revolver
- Yeat, rapper

== Politics ==
- Sean Faircloth, executive director of Secular Coalition for America, former majority whip of Maine House
- Jim Gilchrist, politician
- Richard Nixon, vice president and 37th president of the United States
- Marian Elaine Walters, politician

== Miscellaneous ==
- Farzad Bonyadi, professional poker player
- Dominic Brooklier, former boss of the Los Angeles crime family
- Michael Carona, sheriff
- Paul Frank, clothes designer
- Adam Yahiye Gadahn, spokesman for Al Qaeda, first American charged with treason since 1952
- Maharaja Sir Yeshwant Rao Holkar II, ruler of Indore 1926–1961 (lived in Santa Ana 1938–1939)
- Usha Devi Maharani Sahiba Holkar XV Bahadur, current ruler of Indore since 1961 (grew up in Santa Ana)
- Glenn L. Martin, aviation pioneer
- Sean McMahon, aerospace engineer
- Alex Odeh, murdered Arab-American activist
- Lee Harvey Oswald, assassin of John F. Kennedy (stationed at Marine Corps Air Station El Toro in 1957 and 1958-9)
- Robert Schuller, clergyman, ministry based in Garden Grove (born in Iowa)
- Brett Thomas, teenage spree killer and rapist
- Miranda Weese, ballet dancer
