= Hartfield (disambiguation) =

Hartfield is a civil parish in Sussex, England. U.K.

Hartfield may also refer to:

== Places ==
- Hartfield, New York, U.S.
- Hartfield, New Brunswick, Canada
- Hartfield, Virginia, U.S.

== People ==
- Charlie Hartfield (born 1971), English footballer
- Diego Hartfield (born 1981), Argentine tennis player
- Justin Hartfield, American entrepreneur
- Michael Hartfield (born 1990), American long jumper
- Ronne Hartfield (born Ronola Rone in 1936), American author and museum consultant

== See also ==
- Hartfield-Zodys, an American retail corporation
- Heartfield (surname)
