= List of people from Fullerton, California =

Here follows a list of people from Fullerton, California; that is, of persons born in or who have spent a significant portion of their life in Fullerton, California.

== Arts ==
- Philip K. Dick, author, science fiction
- C.S. Forester, novelist
- Dave Halili, album cover illustrator and designer

== Athletics ==
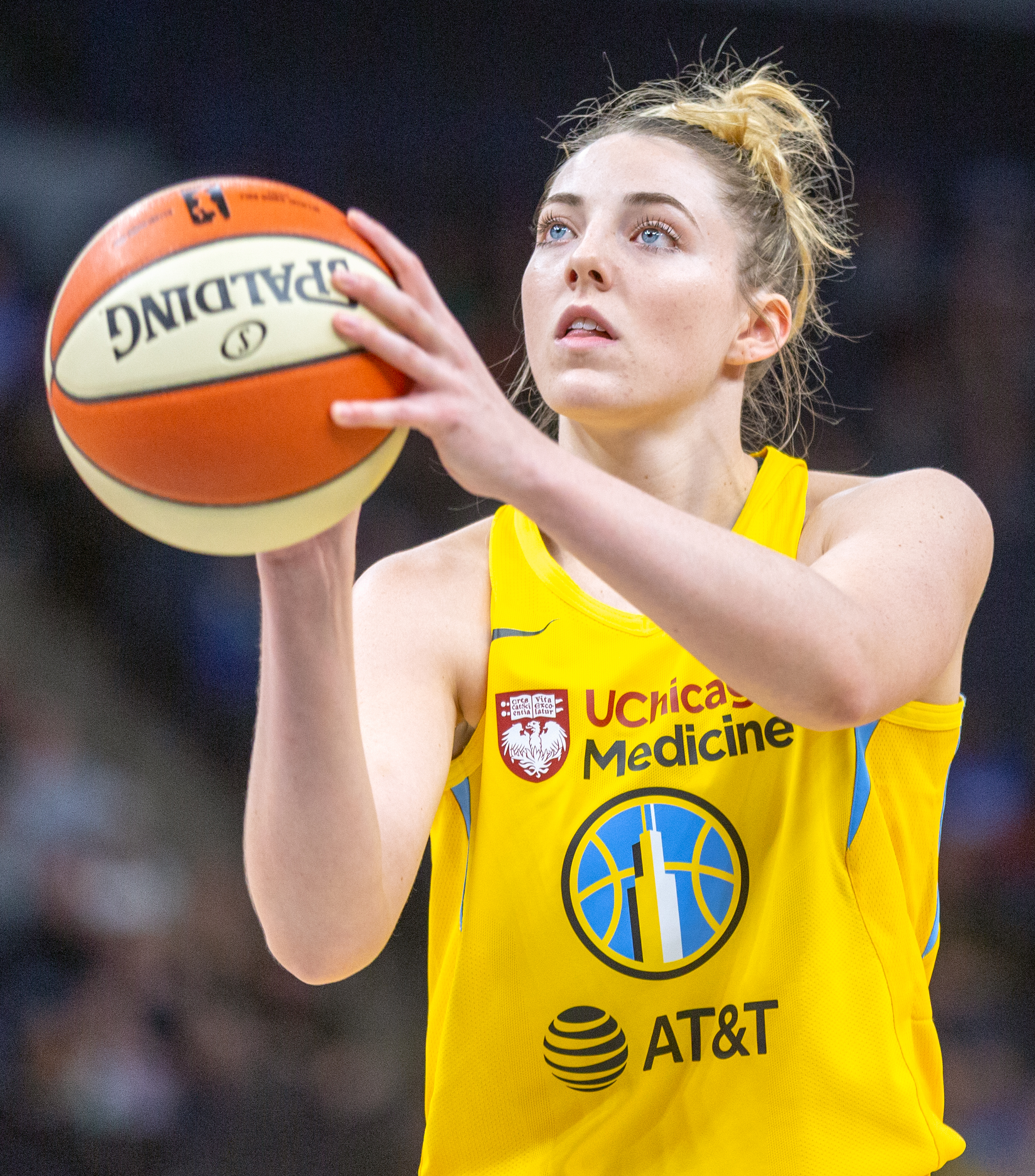
Katie Lou Samuelson

- Paul Abbott, baseball pitcher
- Ed Amelung, baseball player
- Shaun Butler, BMX rider
- Al Campanis, baseball player and executive
- Gary Carter, baseball player, member of MLB Hall of Fame, attended Sunny Hills High School
- Derrick Coleman, deaf professional football player, attended Troy High School
- C. J. Cron, professional baseball player for the Minnesota Twins
- Hector Dyer, Olympic swimmer
- Jim Edmonds, baseball player
- Kay Hansen, mixed martial artist
- Lynn Hill, competitive rock climber
- D. J. Houlton, baseball player who currently plays for Yomiuri Giants in Japan
- Randy Jones, baseball pitcher
- Dan Kennedy, soccer player
- Kourtney Kunichika, professional ice hockey player for the Buffalo Beauts of the NWHL
- Tommy Lasorda, Hall of Fame baseball manager and Dodgers executive, lived in Fullerton
- Phil Nevin, baseball player
- David Newhan, baseball player
- Shawn Ray, bodybuilder
- Jack Salveson, baseball player
- Karlie Samuelson, basketball player
- Katie Lou Samuelson, basketball player
- John Sullivan, football player
- Jeff Tam, baseball player
- Keith Van Horn, basketball player
- Arky Vaughan, Hall of Fame baseball player
- Mike Witt, baseball pitcher
- Eric Wynalda, soccer player
- Gary Zimmerman, football player

== Film, television and theatre ==
- James Cameron, Oscar-winning film director
- Kim Chambers
- Kevin Costner, actor and Oscar-winning director, graduate of California State University, Fullerton
- Suzanne Crough, actress
- Jeremy Gable, playwright
- Jenna Haze, actress
- Chris Hebert, actor
- Chuck Knipp
- Michael McDonald, actor and comedian
- John Raitt, Broadway, television, and film actor and singer
- Steven Seagal, actor
- Skip Stellrecht, actor

== Music ==
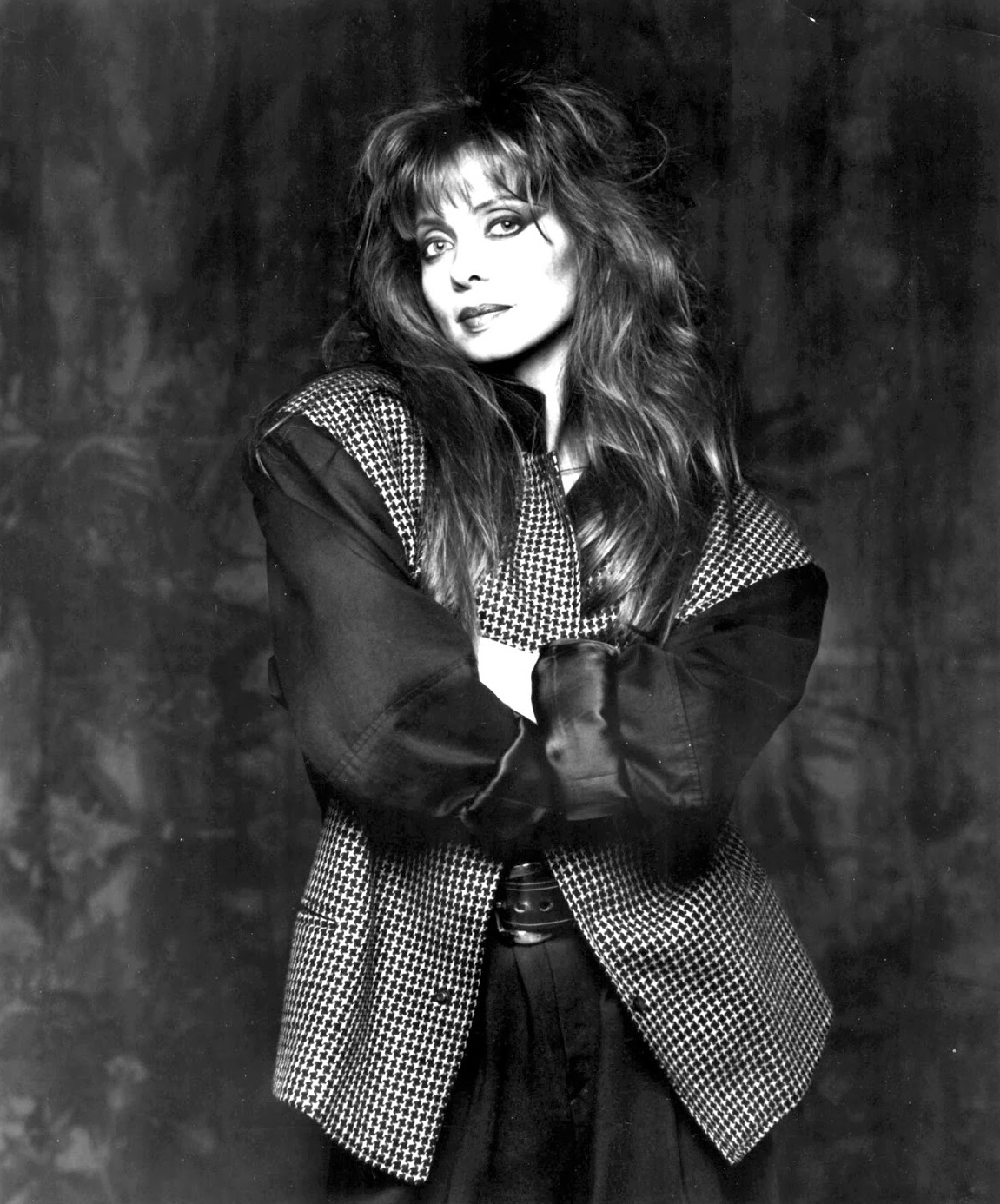
Stacey Q

- The Adolescents (band)
- Agent Orange (band)
- Alfie Agnew, mathematician, songwriter and musician
- Frank Agnew, songwriter and musician
- Rikk Agnew, songwriter and musician
- Jackson Browne, folk music singer-songwriter, graduated from Sunny Hills High School
- Dennis Danell, musician
- Leo Fender, inventor, guitar manufacturer
- Lit (band)
- Mike Ness, musician
- Jory Prum, recording engineer
- Stacey Q, singer, songwriter and actress
- Social Distortion (band)
- Brian St. Clair, drummer for Local H, was raised in Fullerton, California
- Gwen Stefani, singer and television personality
- Tui St. George Tucker, composer, recorder player, instrument developer
- Überzone, electronic musician
- Yeat, rapper

== Politics ==
- Dick Ackerman, member of the California State Assembly and California Senate
- Sam L. Collins, U.S. representative for California and member of the California State Assembly
- William Dannemeyer, U.S. representative for California
- Viet D. Dinh, assistant U.S. attorney general under President George W. Bush
- Jimmy Gomez, U.S. representative for California
- Lon Nol, marshal and former president of the Khmer Republic

== Other ==
- David Boies, attorney
- James Harder, engineer, professor
- Ethel Jacobson, poet
- Leon Leyson, believed to be the youngest member of the Schindlerjuden who were saved from the Holocaust by Oskar Schindler
- Nadya Suleman, mother of octuplets
- Kelly Thomas, homeless man beaten to death by the Fullerton Police Department
- John Witt, baseball collector

== See also ==
- List of people from Orange County, California
