= C. J. Cron =

American baseball player (born 1990)

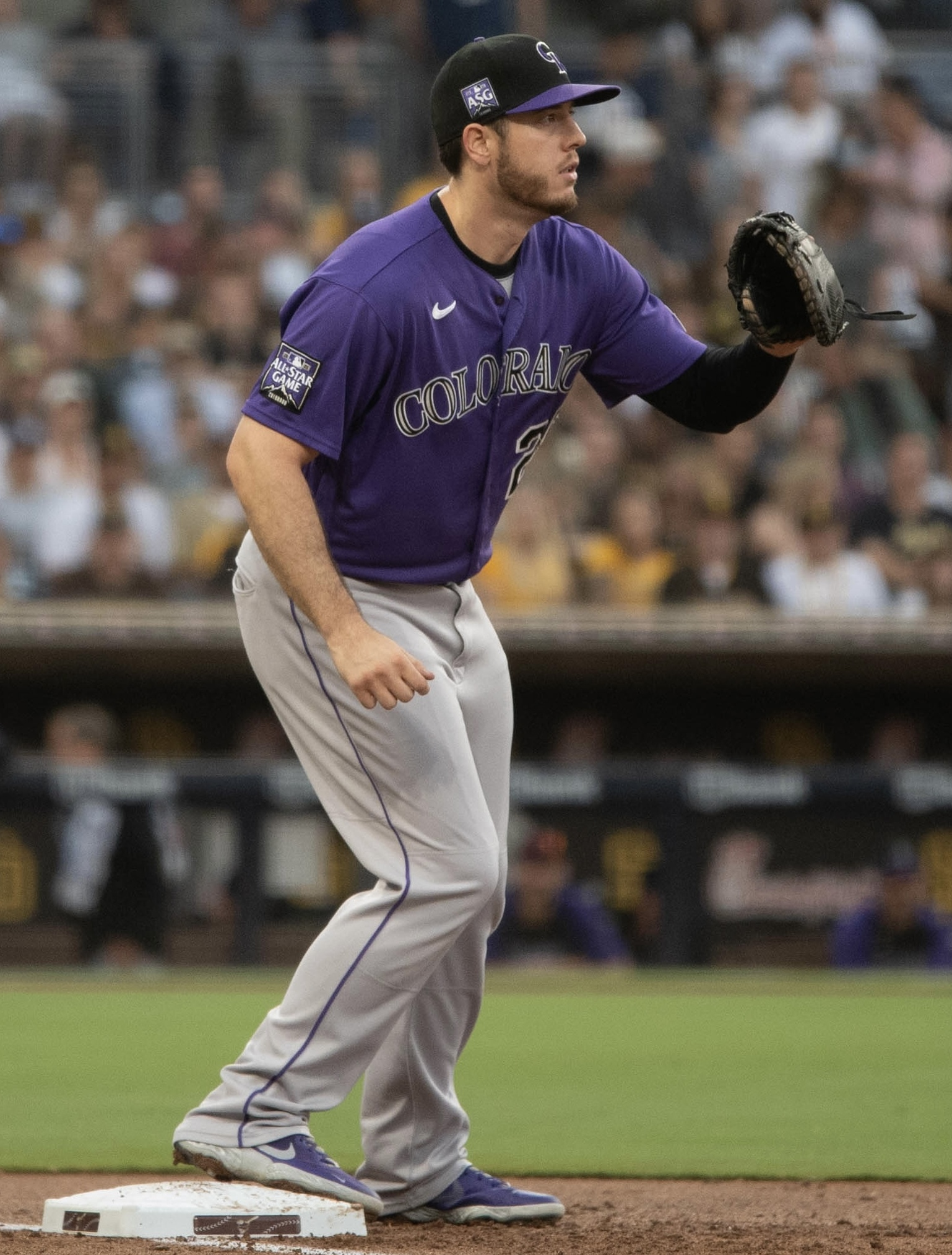
- Cron with the Colorado Rockies in 2021
- First baseman / Designated hitter
- Born: January 5, 1990 (age 36); Fullerton, California, U.S.
- Batted: Right Threw: Right

MLB debut
- May 3, 2014, for the Los Angeles Angels

Last MLB appearance
- September 21, 2023, for the Los Angeles Angels

MLB statistics
- Batting average: .260
- Home runs: 187
- Runs batted in: 604
- Stats at Baseball Reference

Teams
- Los Angeles Angels of Anaheim / Los Angeles Angels (2014–2017); Tampa Bay Rays (2018); Minnesota Twins (2019); Detroit Tigers (2020); Colorado Rockies (2021–2023); Los Angeles Angels (2023)

Career highlights and awards
- All-Star (2022)

Christopher John Cron Jr. (/kroʊn/ KROHN; born January 5, 1990) is an American former professional baseball first baseman and designated hitter. He has previously played in Major League Baseball (MLB) for the Los Angeles Angels, Tampa Bay Rays, Minnesota Twins, Detroit Tigers and Colorado Rockies. He bats and throws right-handed.

== Amateur career ==
Cron attended Mountain Pointe High School in Phoenix, Arizona, and graduated in 2008. He was drafted by the Chicago White Sox in the 44th round (1320th overall) of the 2008 Major League Baseball draft, but he did not sign, opting to attend the University of Utah, where he played college baseball for the Utah Utes baseball team.

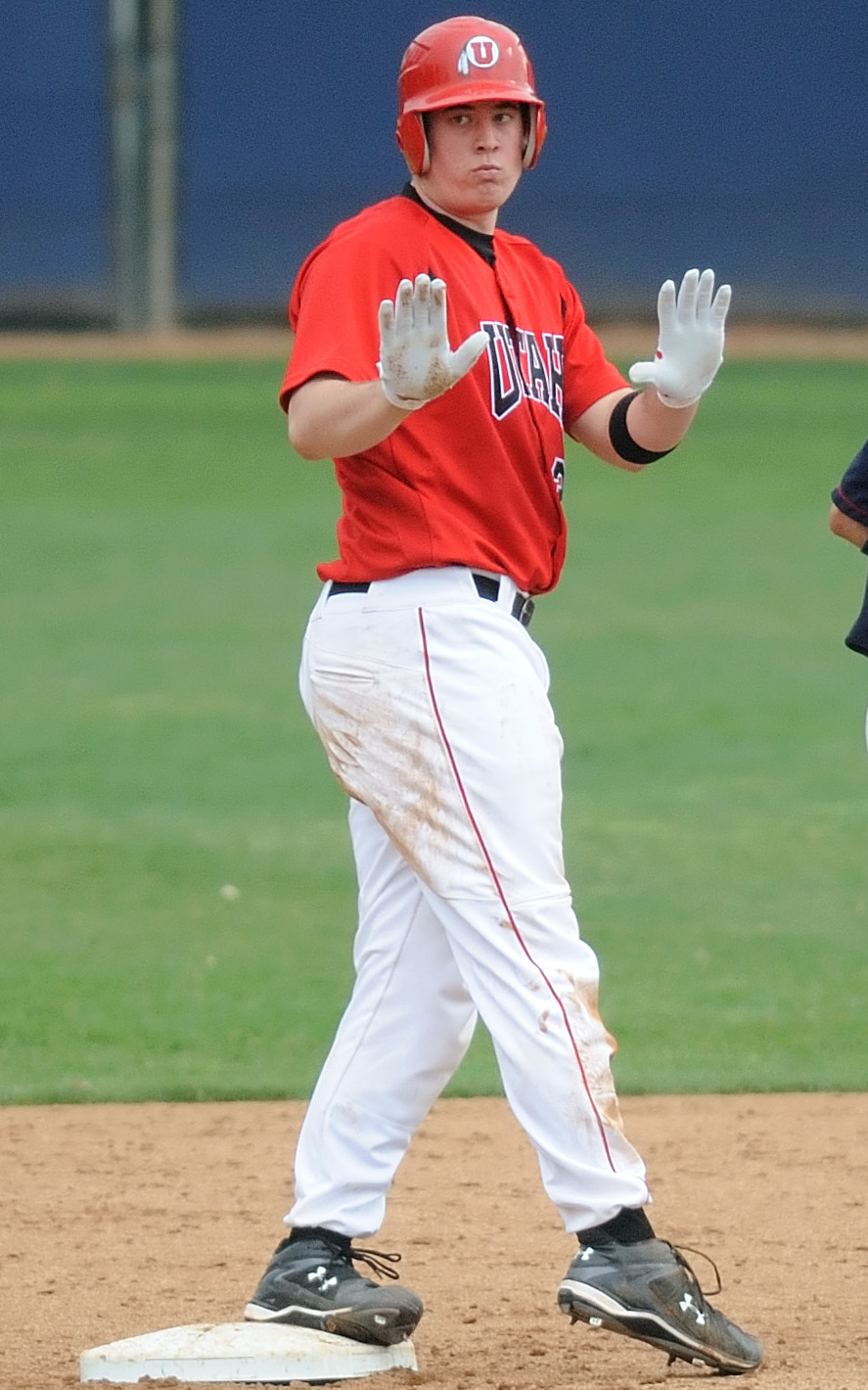
Cron as a freshman with Utah in 2009

In 2009, Cron was named a second Team College Freshman All-American and Mountain West Conference (MWC) Freshman of the Year. In 2010, he was named a third Team College All-American, MWC All-Star and MWC Player of the Year. After the 2010 season, he played collegiate summer baseball with the Cotuit Kettleers of the Cape Cod Baseball League. In 2011, Cron led the nation in on-base plus slugging (OPS) (1.320) and slugging percentage, for which he was named a Baseball America All-American.

== Professional career ==
=== Los Angeles Angels of Anaheim / Los Angeles Angels ===
The Angels selected Cron in the first round, with the 17th overall selection, of the 2011 Major League Baseball draft. He made his professional debut that season with the Rookie-level Orem Owlz of the Pioneer League that year.

In 2012, Cron played for the Inland Empire 66ers of the Class A-Advanced California League, where he had a .293 batting average with 27 home runs and 123 runs batted in (RBIs). He played for the Arkansas Travelers of the Class AA Texas League in 2013, and hit .274 with 14 home runs and 83 RBIs. Cron began the 2014 season with the Salt Lake Bees of the Class AAA Pacific Coast League. He hit .319 with six home runs and 26 RBIs in 28 games for Salt Lake.

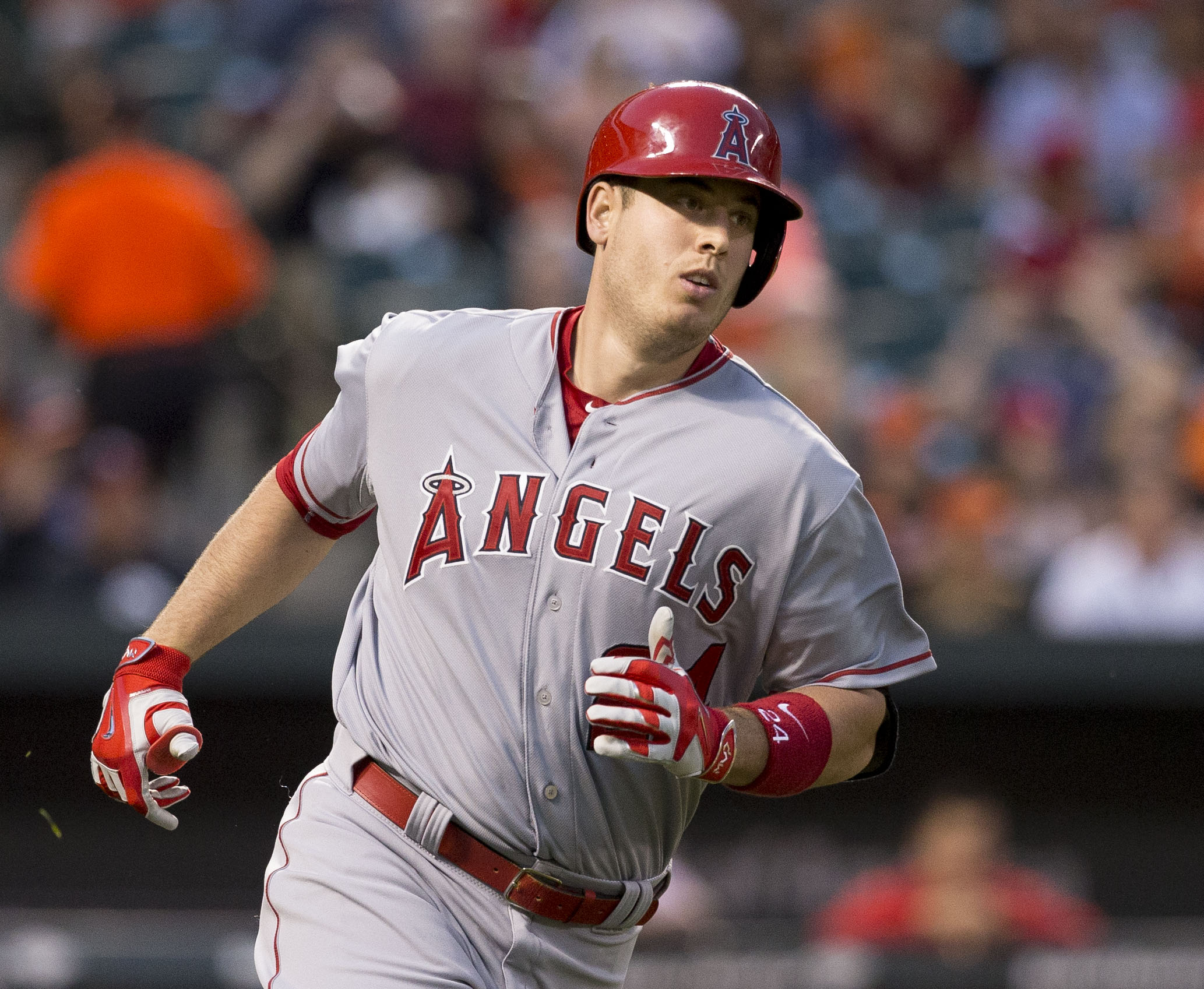
Cron with the Los Angeles Angels of Anaheim in 2015

Cron made his Major League Baseball (MLB) debut with the Angels on May 3, 2014. Cron hit his first career major league home run on May 10, in an eventual win against the Toronto Blue Jays. The Angels continued to use Raúl Ibañez as their designated hitter, while Ibañez mentored Cron, in spite of Ibañez's struggles. Following the release of Ibañez on June 21, Cron became the Angels' primary designated hitter as well as playing first base frequently. He finished the season with a .256 batting average and 11 home runs. Cron was the starting DH for the Angels opening day roster in 2015, but was optioned to Triple-A twice during the season. After struggling at the plate and with some nagging injuries, Cron only played in 113 games in 2015 and hit 16 home runs for the Angels.

Cron once again made the team out of spring training in 2016, serving as their DH and occasional first baseman. On July 2, he had six hits, including two home runs and a double, in a 21–2 defeat of the Boston Red Sox. Cron tied his career high in 2016 with 16 home runs in 116 games, while also hitting .278 with 69 RBI.

The Angels optioned Cron to Salt Lake on May 22, 2017, after enduring a slow start to the season. He was called back up after a month. He finished the season with a .248 average and 16 home runs.

=== Tampa Bay Rays ===
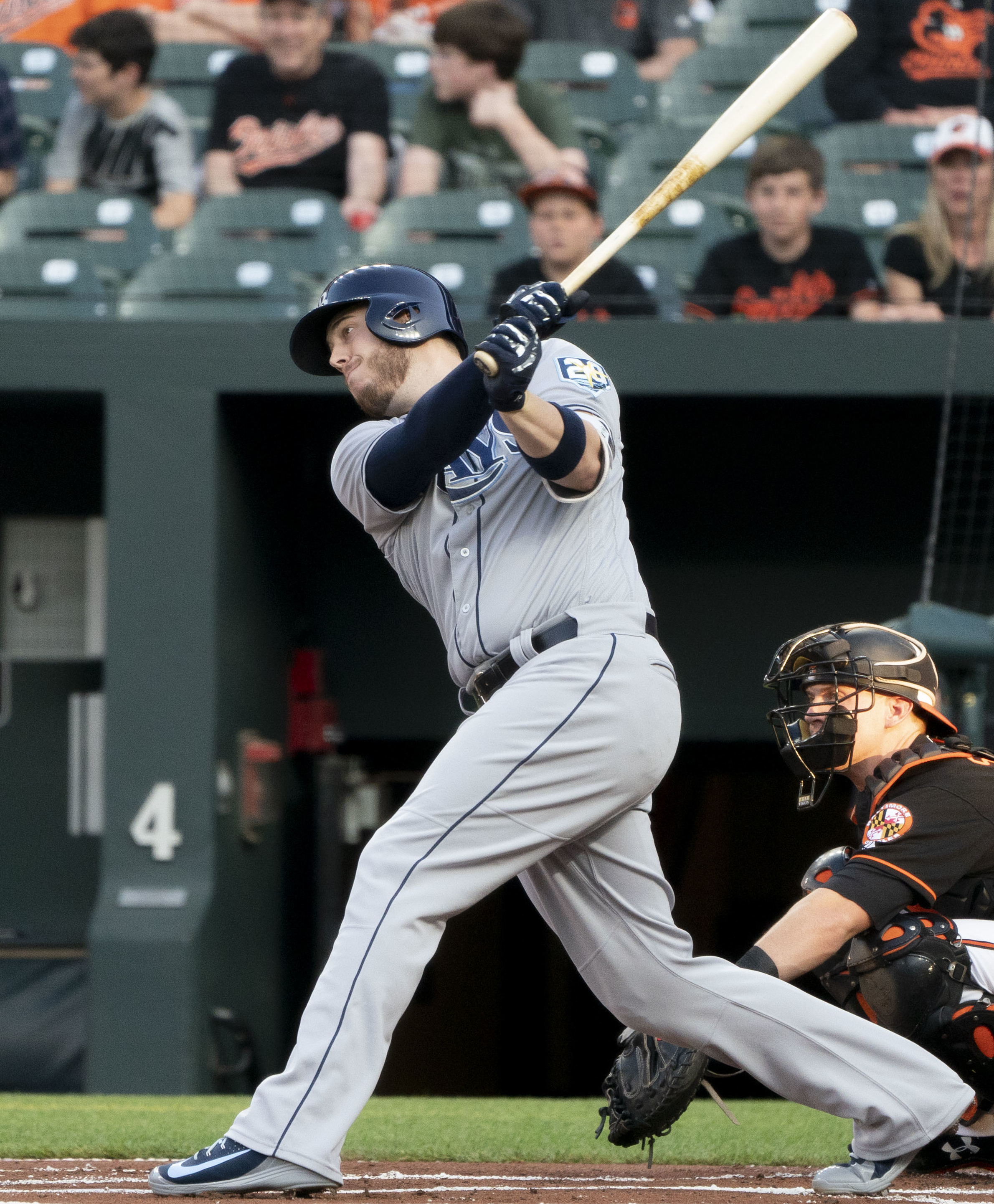
Cron with the Rays

On February 17, 2018, the Angels traded Cron to the Tampa Bay Rays in exchange for a player to be named later (Luis Rengifo). On July 9, Cron hit his 17th home run of the season, setting a new career high before the All-Star break. On July 26, Cron hit his 20th home run of the season against the New York Yankees. Cron finished his season with career highs in home runs, hitting 30 over 140 games. He also slashed .253/.323/.493 with 74 runs batted in and finished sixth among designated hitters in wins above replacement.

On November 20, the Rays designated Cron for assignment.

=== Minnesota Twins ===
On November 26, 2018, Cron was claimed off waivers by the Minnesota Twins. In 125 games, Cron hit .253 with 25 home runs and 78 RBI. On December 2, 2019, Cron was non-tendered by Minnesota and became a free agent.

=== Detroit Tigers ===
On December 21, 2019, Cron signed a one-year, $6.1 million contract with the Detroit Tigers. On July 24, 2020, Cron made his Tigers debut as Opening Day starting first baseman. On August 15, 2020, it was announced Cron needed season-ending knee surgery. Overall with the 2020 Detroit Tigers, Cron batted .190 with four home runs and 8 RBIs in 13 games.

=== Colorado Rockies ===
On February 15, 2021, Cron signed a minor league contract with the Colorado Rockies organization that included an invitation to Spring Training. On March 20, Cron's contract was selected to the 40-man roster. On October 5, 2021, he signed a 2-year, $14.5 million extension with the Rockies. In his first season with the Rockies, Cron batted .281/.375/.530 with 28 home runs and a career-high 92 RBIs and 70 runs scored. The following season, Cron established career highs in games played (150), runs (79), hits (148) & RBI (102) to go with an All-Star selection.. On the 2023 season, Cron missed part of the first half due to a back injury, only appearing in 56 games.

=== Los Angeles Angels (second stint) ===
On July 30, 2023, Cron was traded along with Randal Grichuk to the Angels in exchange for minor league pitchers Jake Madden and Mason Albright.

=== Boston Red Sox ===
On March 1, 2024, Cron signed a minor league contract with the Boston Red Sox. On March 22, Cron triggered the opt–out clause in his contract and he was released two days later.

== Personal life ==
Cron is the son of former MLB player Chris Cron. Cron's younger brother, Kevin, also played professional baseball. Their cousin, Chad Moeller, also played in MLB.

== See also ==
- List of Major League Baseball single-game hits leaders
- List of people from Fullerton, California
- List of second-generation Major League Baseball players
- List of University of Utah people

Awards and achievements
| Preceded by Joey Votto | National League Player of the Month; August 2021 | Succeeded by Tyler O'Neill |
