= Chad Moeller =

American baseball player (born 1975)

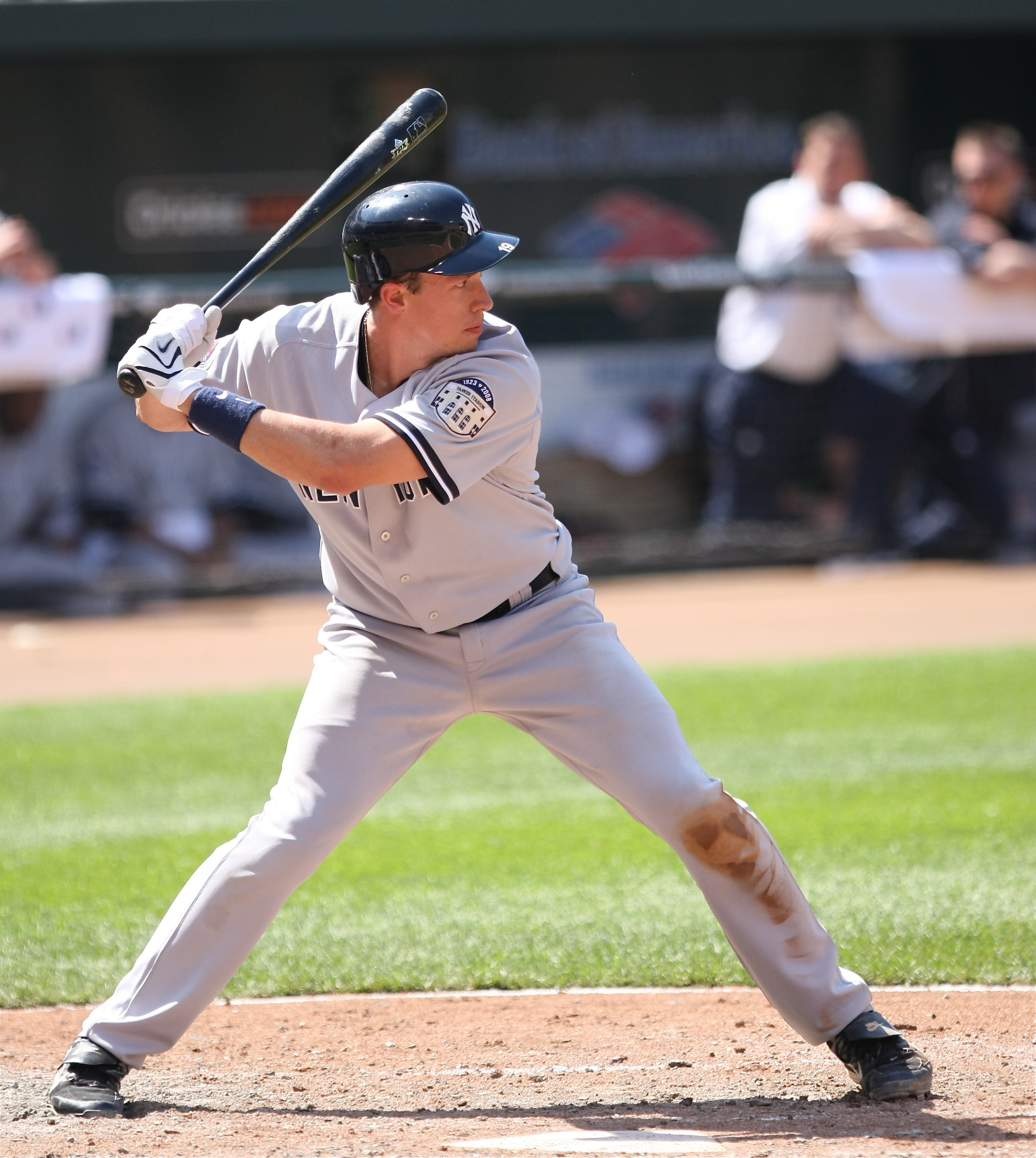
- Moeller with the New York Yankees
- Catcher
- Born: February 18, 1975 (age 51); Upland, California, U.S.
- Batted: Right Threw: Right

MLB debut
- June 20, 2000, for the Minnesota Twins

Last MLB appearance
- September 25, 2010, for the New York Yankees

MLB statistics
- Batting average: .226
- Home runs: 29
- Runs batted in: 132
- Stats at Baseball Reference

Teams
- Minnesota Twins (2000); Arizona Diamondbacks (2001–2003); Milwaukee Brewers (2004–2006); Cincinnati Reds (2007); Los Angeles Dodgers (2007); New York Yankees (2008); Baltimore Orioles (2009); New York Yankees (2010)

Chad Edward Moeller [MOE-ler] (born February 18, 1975) is an American former professional baseball catcher. He played in Major League Baseball (MLB) from 2000 through 2010 for the Minnesota Twins, Arizona Diamondbacks, Milwaukee Brewers, Cincinnati Reds, Los Angeles Dodgers, New York Yankees, and Baltimore Orioles.

== Amateur career ==
Moeller attended Upland High School in California, where he lettered in football and baseball. He was teammates with future MLB players Geoff Jenkins, Jacque Jones, Morgan Ensberg and Randy Flores. The New York Yankees drafted Moeller in the 1993 MLB draft, but he did not sign.

He attended the University of Southern California (USC) and played college baseball for the USC Trojans baseball team. In 1995, he played collegiate summer baseball with the Orleans Cardinals of the Cape Cod Baseball League and was named a league all-star. In 1996, he was an All-Pac-10 Conference selection. He tore his ACL on a home plate collision to end his college career.

== Professional career ==
=== Minnesota Twins ===
Despite the injury, Moeller was drafted in the seventh round (187th overall) of the 1996 Major League Baseball draft by the Minnesota Twins. During his time in the Twins organization, he competed for playing time with Matt LeCroy and A.J. Pierzynski. After LeCroy hit .170 in 48 games, Moeller was called up to the majors. He made his debut on June 20, 2000, and got his first hit two days later against the Texas Rangers. On July 29, Moeller hit his first homer, a tie-breaking, three-run inside-the-park home run against the New York Yankees. When Moeller hit .216 through 33 games, the Twins called up Pierzynski, who hit .303 the rest of the way.

=== Arizona Diamondbacks ===
On March 28, 2001, Moeller was traded to the Arizona Diamondbacks for infielder Hanley Frias. That year, he hit .232 in 25 games with the big league club. During the 2002 season, Moeller was called up on July 15 and primarily caught Randy Johnson. He was behind the plate for Johnson's 15 strikeout performance against the Montreal Expos on July 31; 16 strikeout game against the Chicago Cubs on August 25; and 17 strikeout performance against the Milwaukee Brewers on September 14. On the last day of the season, he helped the Diamondbacks clinch home field advantage on the playoffs by homering twice and driving in six runs. Moeller started Game 1 of the National League Division Series against the St. Louis Cardinals. Johnson allowed five earned runs on 10 hits in six innings in what would become a 12–2 loss.

After catcher Damian Miller was traded before the 2003 season, Moeller split catching duties with Rod Barajas. He managed to hit .268 with seven home runs and 29 RBI that year, though Moeller lost favor in the organization and was rarely used in the last few weeks of the season.

=== Milwaukee Brewers ===
On December 1, 2003, the Diamondbacks included Moeller in a nine-player deal. He, along with Chris Capuano, Craig Counsell, Lyle Overbay, Jorge De La Rosa, and Junior Spivey, were traded to the Milwaukee Brewers for Shane Nance, Noochie Varner, and Richie Sexson.

On April 27, 2004, Moeller hit for the cycle against the Cincinnati Reds. He was the first Brewer to hit for the cycle at home, and the first since Paul Molitor did it on May 15, 1991. He became Ben Sheets' personal catcher that year and caught his 18 strikeout performance against the Atlanta Braves on May 16. After Moeller hit .208 in a career-high 101 games, the Brewers signed Damian Miller to be the starting catcher in 2005.

In January 2006, he was named to Team USA's preliminary roster for the 2006 World Baseball Classic. However, he was later dropped from the final roster. He hit .184 in 29 games during the 2006 season and was designated for assignment on July 5. Moeller was then outrighted to Triple-A. On July 15, he caught a combined no-hitter with the Sounds' Carlos Villanueva, Mike Meyers, and Alec Zumwalt.

=== Cincinnati Reds ===
On November 27, 2006, Moeller signed a one-year deal with the Cincinnati Reds. He began the season as one of three catchers on the 25-man roster. However, he was designated for assignment on April 18, 2007. He hit .167 in 30 games over three stints with the Reds that season.

=== Los Angeles Dodgers ===
He was traded to the Los Angeles Dodgers for cash considerations on August 11, 2007. Moeller spent time with the Las Vegas 51s in Triple-A before he was called up in September.

=== Washington Nationals ===
On November 27, 2007, Moeller signed a Minor League contract with an invitation to spring training with the Washington Nationals. He was released on March 9, 2008.

=== New York Yankees ===
He signed a minor league contract with the New York Yankees on the same day he left the Nationals. The Yankees purchased his contract on April 14 following injuries to Jorge Posada and José Molina. On April 25, he was designated for assignment because it had been thought that Posada would be able to play through his injury. Posada, however, was placed on the 15-day disabled list on April 28, and the Yankees added Moeller back to the active roster upon clearing assignment waivers on April 30. He remained on the active roster following Posada's return from the disabled list and appeared at first base and third base for the first time in his career.

Moeller was again designated for assignment on July 31 following the acquisition of Iván Rodríguez. He cleared waivers and returned to Triple-A Scranton. Moeller rejoined the Yankees on September 1, when the rosters expanded.

=== Baltimore Orioles ===
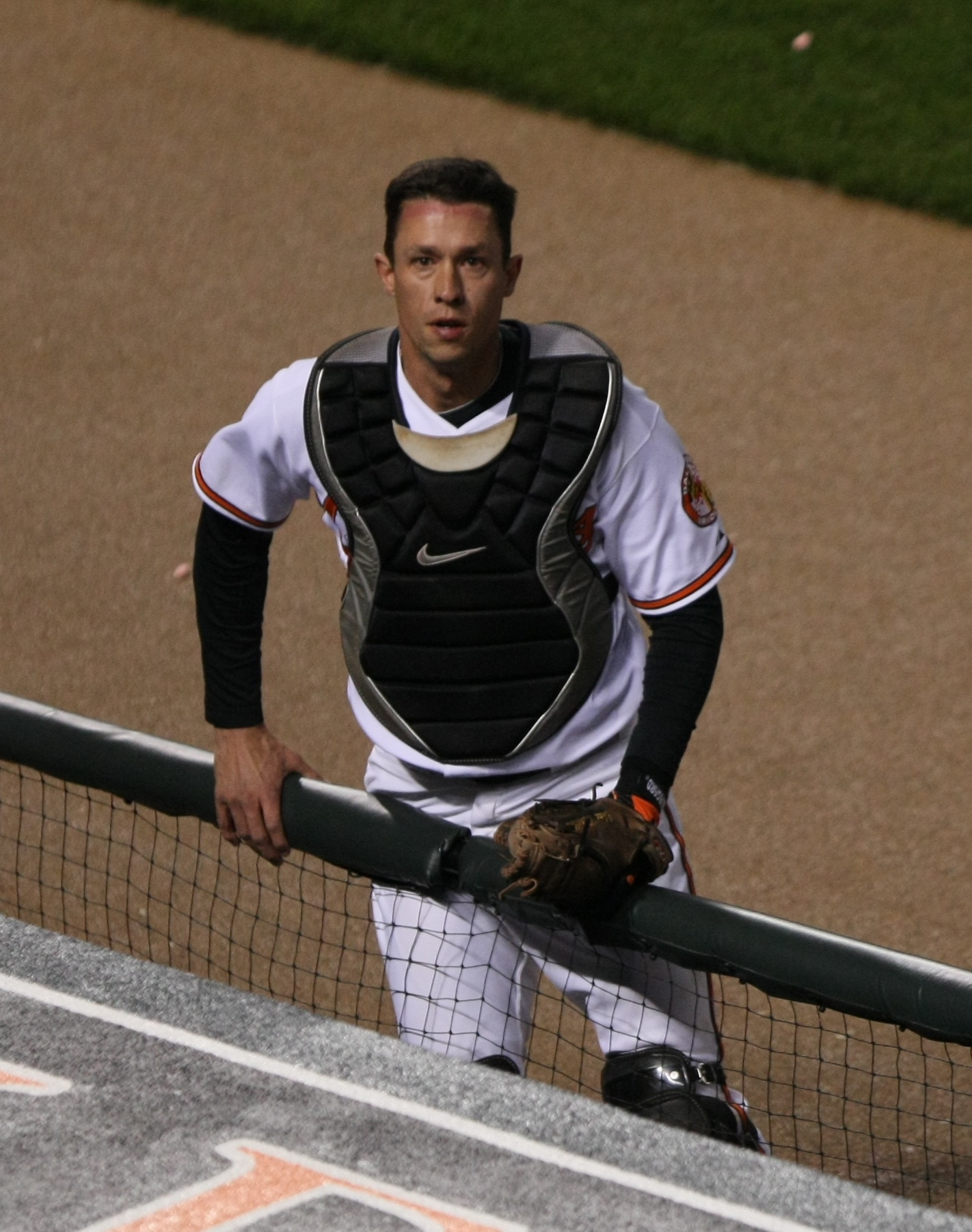
Moeller with the Baltimore Orioles in 2009

Moeller signed a minor league contract with the Baltimore Orioles on December 12, 2008. He was brought in to help mentor Matt Wieters during spring training. Moeller ultimately made the Opening Day roster as the backup catcher to Gregg Zaun. After batting .200 with a .259 on-base percentage in fifteen games, he was designated for assignment on May 29 when the Orioles promoted top catching prospect Matt Wieters from the Triple-A Norfolk Tides. Moeller cleared waivers five days later and was assigned to the Tides. Moeller was recalled to Baltimore on August 7 when the Orioles traded Zaun to the Tampa Bay Rays. He made 30 total appearances for Baltimore on the year, slashing .258/.313/.438 with two home runs and 10 RBI. On October 29, the Orioles declined their club option on Moeller for the 2010 season, making him a free agent.

Moeller was signed to a minor league contract which included an invitation to spring training with the Baltimore Orioles on December 4, 2009. He was granted his release on April 1 after not making the team.

=== New York Yankees (second stint) ===
On April 3, Moeller signed a minor league contract with the New York Yankees. On May 20, he was called up to the Major League roster to back up Francisco Cervelli after another injury to Posada. He played his first game of the season on May 29, starting against the Cleveland Indians. On June 21, Moeller was designated for assignment to clear room on the roster for outfielder Colin Curtis, returning to the Scranton Wilkes-Barre Yankees on June 26. He was called up again on September 1.

=== Colorado Rockies ===
On January 19, 2011, Moeller signed a minor league deal with the Colorado Rockies. However, he was released on March 11.

== Personal life ==
Chad lives happily in Arizona with his three children. Moeller is the cousin of MLB coach Chris Cron, who is the father of C. J. Cron, and Kevin Cron.

Moeller is now a youth baseball instructor and owns a batting cage facility in Scottsdale, Arizona. He is also the owner and operator of Team Dinger, which fields several youth baseball teams in Arizona. In 2016, he worked with Tim Tebow to help the former quarterback prepare for a career as a baseball player.

== See also ==
- List of Major League Baseball players to hit for the cycle

Achievements
Preceded by Vladimir Guerrero	Hitting for the cycle April 27, 2004	Succeeded by Daryle Ward
