= Hunger Artists Theatre Company =

California alternative theatre group

The Hunger Artists Theatre Company was an alternative theatre company located in a business park in Fullerton, California, United States. They were known for presenting challenging, thought-provoking plays, musicals, world premiere pieces, and re-imaginings of classic plays. The company, named after a short story by Franz Kafka, was founded in 1996 by a group of longtime friends and is the first Orange County-based alternative theater to grow out of Orange Coast College's Repertory Theater. During its sixteen-year existence, the company had a number of homes including Costa Mesa, downtown Santa Ana, and finally on South State College Boulevard in the former home of the Vanguard Theatre Ensemble. Hunger is credited with helping launch Theatre Out, an LGBTQ+ theatre company that had productions at Hunger before expanding to their own space in 2009. The company closed in December, 2012 following a production of Rag and Bone by Noah Haidle. Affected by the Great Recession, the company became the third Fullerton theater in two years to shut its doors due to financial pressures.

== Notable productions ==
Hunger produced more than 150 shows during its existence. The Hunger Artists received numerous acclaim and awards for contemporary plays such as "Bash: Latter-Day Plays", "4.48 Psychosis" and "The Gog/Magog Project", world premieres such as "The Land Southward", "The Flying Spaghetti Monster Holiday Pageant" and "The Pledge Drive: Ruminations On The Hunger Artist", world premiere adaptations of literary works such as The Metamorphosis, Little Women and Rudyard Kipling's Jungle Book, reworkings of classic plays such as White Trash Private Lives, Re: Woyzeck and an all-male The Importance of Being Earnest, musicals such as Sweeney Todd, Assassins and Hedwig and the Angry Inch, one-act festivals such as Beyond Convention, 24 Hour Theater and Last Chance Fest, and original late-night entertainment such as the Orange County Underground Burlesque Society and Muddville.

Their Halloween show, Madame Guignol's Macabre Theatre, became a Halloween tradition and was presented each Halloween for ten years before retiring in 2005. Other productions that received particular acclaim included Sans Merci (2010), Turn of the Screw (2011), Almost Maine (2011),

== Notable people ==
British-born playwright Jeremy Gable served as artistic director of the company from December 2006 to April 2009, where he directed the Orange County premieres of Sarah Kane's 4.48 Psychosis and Bryony Lavery's Frozen, as well as writing the Flying Spaghetti Monster plays, which were covered by the official Flying Spaghetti Monster website. Gable was named "one of Orange County's most genuinely innovative theatrical minds" by OC Weekly and called "one of O.C.'s more fertile theatrical minds" by the Orange County Register.

In the summer of 2003 and 2006 John Downey III joined the boards to rave reviews as Pirelli in Sweeney Todd, and Ready Money Matt in The Threepenny Opera. Sweeney Todd went on to win numerous awards at The OC Weekly Theatre Awards including Best Show, Best Direction (tie) and Best Performance.

On May 21, 2010, Daniel Wozniak performed in Hunger's production of Nine hours after killing his neighbor, PFC Samuel Herr, and college student Juri Kibuishi. Wozniak was later convicted and sentenced to death for the murders.
