= Kevin Hill (TV series) =

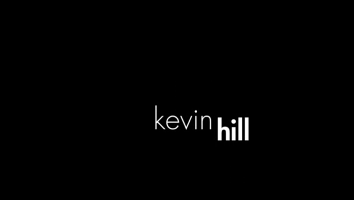
- Genre: Legal drama
- Created by: Jorge A. Reyes
- Starring: Taye Diggs; Jon Seda; Patrick Breen; Christina Hendricks; Kate Levering; Michael Michele; Meagan Good
- Composers: Ed Alton; Gerald Brunskill
- Country of origin: United States
- Original language: English
- No. of seasons: 1
- No. of episodes: 22

Production
- Executive producers: Nancy Cotton; Bruce Davey; Samantha Howard Corbin; Alex Taub
- Producers: Adam Armus; Taye Diggs; Abe Hoch; Nora Kay Foster; Michael J. Maschio
- Cinematography: David Moxness
- Editors: Sarah Boyd; Nancy Morrison; Katie Schaefer; Stewart Schill; Mitchel Stanley
- Camera setup: Single-camera
- Running time: 45–48 minutes
- Production companies: Icon Productions; Touchstone Television

Original release
- Network: UPN
- Release: September 29, 2004 – May 18, 2005

Kevin Hill is an American legal drama that aired on UPN from September 29, 2004, to May 18, 2005. Produced by Icon Productions and Touchstone Television, it was filmed and produced in Toronto, Ontario, Canada.

== Synopsis ==
The series stars Taye Diggs as the title character, a lawyer who has to balance his professional career and his love life with having custody of Sarah, his 10-month-old cousin.

== Cast ==
- Taye Diggs as Kevin Hill
- Jon Seda as Damian "Dame" Ruiz
- Patrick Breen as George Weiss
- Christina Hendricks as Nicolette Raye
- Kate Levering as Veronica Carter
- Michael Michele as Jessie Grey
- Meagan Good as Melanie West
- Robert Smith as Joe Gaskins

== Episodes ==
No.	Title	Directed by	Written by	Original release date
1	"Pilot"	Arvin Brown	Jorge A. Reyes	September 29, 2004
2	"The Good Life"	David Solomon	Scott Simms	October 6, 2004
3	"Making the Grade"	Bruce McDonald	Adam Armus, Nora Kay Foster	October 20, 2004
4	"Homework"	Arvin Brown	Alex Taub	October 27, 2004
5	"Gods and Monsters"	David Straiton	Denitria Harris-Lawrence	November 2, 2004
6	"Snack Daddy"	Arvin Brown	Todd Ellis Kessler	November 3, 2004
7	"House Arrest"	Kelly Makin	Michael Reisz	November 10, 2004
8	"Full Metal Jessie"	Mel Damski	Stephen Hootstein	November 17, 2004
9	"Going for the Juggler"	Arlene Sanford	Joy Blake, Melissa Blake	November 24, 2004
10	"The Unexpected"	Patrick Williams	Alex Taub	December 1, 2004
11	"Love Don't Live Here Anymore"	Milan Cheylov	Denitria Harris-Lawrence	December 15, 2004
12	"Homeland Insecurity"	Stephen Williams	Todd Ellis Kessler	January 5, 2005
13	"Man's Best Friend"	David Solomon	Stephen Hootstein, Michael Reisz	January 26, 2005
14	"A River in Egypt"	David Straiton	Joy Blake, Melissa Blake	February 9, 2005
15	"Occupational Hazard"	Oz Scott	Denitria Harris-Lawrence	February 16, 2005
16	"Cardiac Episode"	Milan Cheylov	Adam Armus, Kay Foster, Todd Ellis Kessler	February 23, 2005
17	"Only Sixteen"	David Solomon	Stephen Hootstein, Alex Taub	March 23, 2005
18	"In This Corner"	Patrick Williams	Charles Johnson	April 13, 2005
19	"The Monroe Doctrine"	Ken Girotti	Adam Armus, Nora Kay Foster, Michael Reisz	April 27, 2005
20	"Through the Looking Glass"	Chris Grismer	Denitria Harris-Lawrence, Todd Ellis Kessler	May 4, 2005
21	"Sacrificial Lambs"	Eric Laneuville	Samantha Corbin-Miller, Stephen Hootstein	May 11, 2005
22	"Losing Isn't Everything"	Arvin Brown	Samantha Corbin-Miller	May 18, 2005

== International broadcast ==
Kevin Hill aired internationally on British channel ABC1, and was later picked up by E4 in the same country. It also aired on Channel 7 in Australia on weekdays at 3pm for a brief period.
