= Chris Cron =

American baseball player and manager (born 1964)

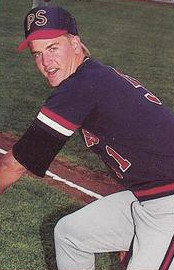
- Cron with the Palm Springs Angels in 1988

Athletics – No. 41
- First baseman / Left fielder
- Born: March 31, 1964 (age 62); Albuquerque, New Mexico, U.S.
- Batted: Right Threw: Right

MLB debut
- August 15, 1991, for the California Angels

Last MLB appearance
- October 4, 1992, for the Chicago White Sox

MLB statistics
- Batting average: .080
- Home runs: 0
- Runs batted in: 0
- Stats at Baseball Reference

Teams
- As player: California Angels (1991); Chicago White Sox (1992); As coach: Arizona Diamondbacks (2021); Oakland Athletics / Athletics (2022–present)

Christopher John Cron Sr. (born March 31, 1964) is an American former professional baseball player, manager, and current coach. He played in Major League Baseball (MLB) for the California Angels and Chicago White Sox, and has managed in Minor League Baseball (MiLB). As of 2021, he is the assistant hitting coach for the Athletics.

He is the father of C.J. Cron and Kevin Cron who are also professional baseball players.

== Career ==
Drafted by the Atlanta Braves in the second round of the 1984 MLB draft, Cron made his MLB debut with the California Angels on August 15, 1991, and appeared in his final game on October 4, 1992.

During the 1995 season, Cron retired and became manager of the Bristol White Sox, a minor league affiliate of the Chicago White Sox, and has spent several years as a manager in the White Sox farm system.

Cron has managed at every level in the minor leagues, starting in 1995. His teams have included: Bristol (1995), Hickory (1996–97), Winston-Salem (1998 and 2005), Birmingham (1999 and 2006), Colorado Springs (2000–02), Great Falls (2003 and 2007–08), and Kannapolis (2004). He served as roving minor league infield coach in 2009. He was the manager of the Great Falls Voyagers in 2010.

On Monday, December 13, 2010, Cron was named manager of the Erie SeaWolves. In 2013, he was selected as one of several managers for the All-Star Futures Game. In 2019, he was hired as manager of the Reno Aces. He managed his son, Kevin, while he was on the Aces in 2019.

On January 14, 2022, Cron was hired as the assistant hitting coach for the Oakland Athletics.

== Personal ==
His sons, C. J. and Kevin Cron, are professional baseball players. He is the cousin of Major League Baseball player Chad Moeller.

Preceded by Bill Hayes	Colorado Springs Sky Sox manager 2000–2002	Succeeded by Rick Sofield
