= Kevin Cron =

American baseball player (born 1993)

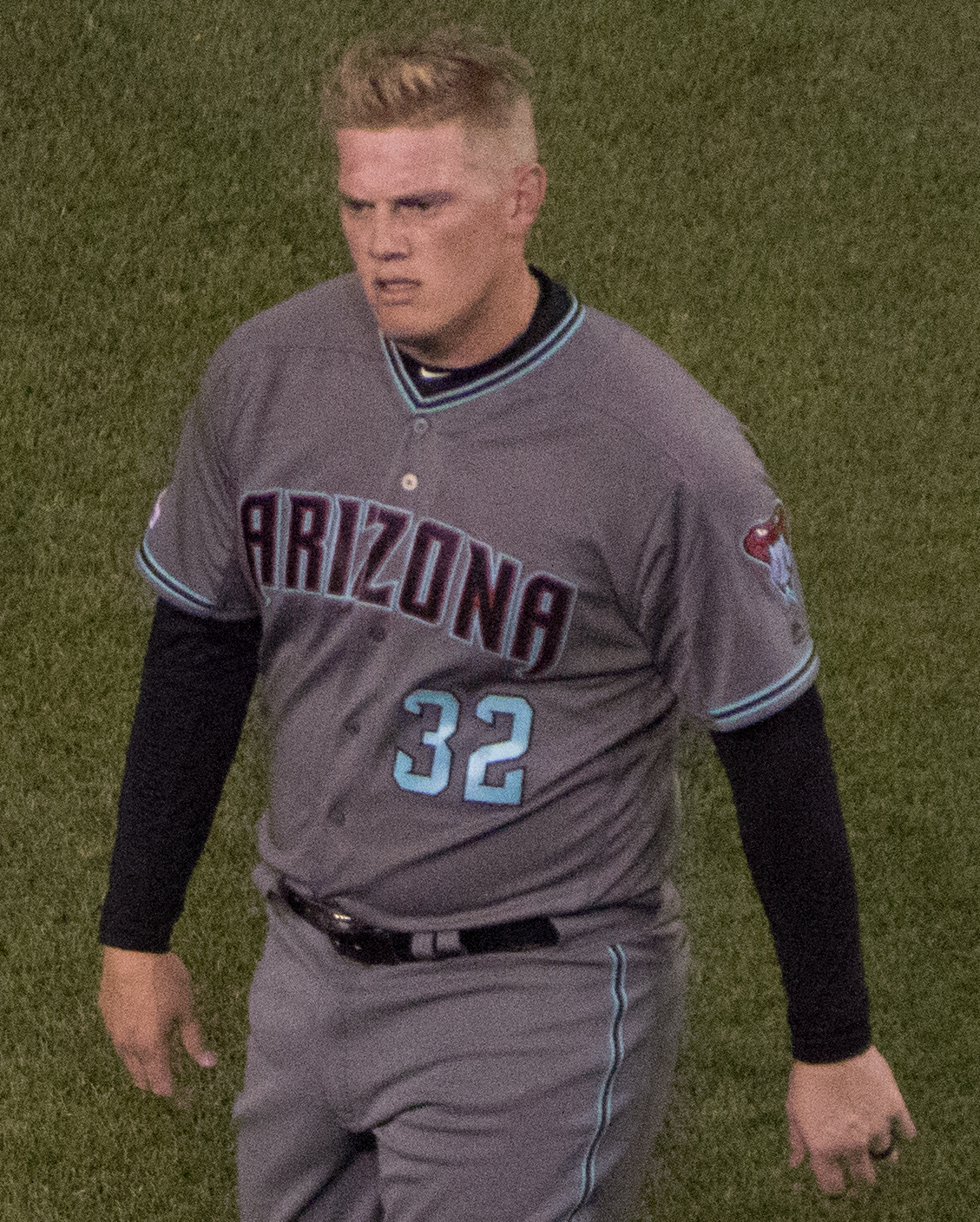
- Cron with the Diamondbacks in 2019
- First baseman
- Born: February 17, 1993 (age 33); Placentia, California, U.S.
- Batted: Right Threw: Right

Professional debut
- MLB: May 24, 2019, for the Arizona Diamondbacks
- NPB: March 26, 2021, for the Hiroshima Toyo Carp
- KBO: April 2, 2022, for the SSG Landers

Last appearance
- MLB: August 23, 2020, for the Arizona Diamondbacks
- NPB: June 11, 2021, for the Hiroshima Toyo Carp
- KBO: July 6, 2022, for the SSG Landers

MLB statistics
- Batting average: .170
- Home runs: 6
- Runs batted in: 16

NPB statistics
- Batting average: .231
- Home runs: 6
- Runs batted in: 16

KBO statistics
- Batting average: .222
- Home runs: 11
- Runs batted in: 35
- Stats at Baseball Reference

Teams
- Arizona Diamondbacks (2019–2020); Hiroshima Toyo Carp (2021); SSG Landers (2022)

Kevin Scott Cron (born February 17, 1993) is an American former professional baseball first baseman. He played in Major League Baseball (MLB) for the Arizona Diamondbacks, in Nippon Professional Baseball (NPB) for the Hiroshima Toyo Carp, and in the KBO League for the SSG Landers.

== Amateur career ==
Cron attended Mountain Pointe High School in Ahwatukee, Phoenix, Arizona. He played for the school's baseball team as a catcher, and had a .560 batting average in 2011, his senior year. He set Arizona state high records for home runs in a season (27) and a career (60). He was named to the USA Today's All-USA high school baseball team. Prior to the 2011 Major League Baseball (MLB) draft, Baseball America ranked him as the 133rd best prospect available. He was selected in the third round of the draft by the Seattle Mariners, but opted not to sign.

Cron enrolled at Texas Christian University (TCU), where he played college baseball for the TCU Horned Frogs baseball team. He suffered a back injury that cost him playing time as a freshman, but batted .338 with six home runs and 34 runs batted in (RBIs) in 43 games. As a sophomore. Cron struggled, batting only .208, with two home runs, and 20 RBIs. After his sophomore season, he played collegiate summer baseball for the Falmouth Commodores of the Cape Cod Baseball League (CCBL), where he improved his performance, Cron's .350 batting average was second in the CCBL, and he was named the west division's most valuable player in the league's All-Star Game. He hit six home runs in 2014, his junior year, including one in the 2014 College World Series. He was named the first baseman on the College World Series All-Tournament Team.

== Professional career ==
=== Arizona Diamondbacks ===
The Arizona Diamondbacks selected Cron in the 14th round of the 2014 MLB draft, and signed. Cron made his professional debut with the Missoula Osprey of the Rookie-level Pioneer League, and received a midseason promotion to the Hillsboro Hops of the Low–A Northwest League. Cron finished 2014 with a combined .291 batting average along with 12 home runs and 45 RBIs. He played for the Visalia Rawhide of the High–A California League in 2015 where he batted .272 with 27 home runs and 97 RBIs, and the Mobile BayBears of the Double–A Southern League in 2016 where he batted .222 with 26 home runs and 88 RBIs.

After the 2016 season, the Diamondbacks assigned Cron to the Salt River Rafters of the Arizona Fall League. In 2017, Cron played for the Jackson Generals of the Southern League, and was named the league's most valuable player after batting .283 with 25 home runs and 91 RBIs. The Diamondbacks assigned Cron to the Reno Aces of the Triple–A Pacific Coast League in 2018 where he spent the whole season hitting .309 with 22 home runs and 97 RBIs. The Diamondbacks added Cron to their 40-man roster after the 2018 season. He began the 2019 season with Reno.

On May 24, the Diamondbacks promoted Cron to the major leagues. At the time of his call up, Cron was leading all of the minor leagues with 21 home runs and 62 RBIs. He made his debut that same day in an 18–2 win in San Francisco over the Giants. In 71 at bats he hit .211/.269/.521. He led the minor leagues in home runs in 2019, with 39, and was second in RBIs, with 107.

On October 31, 2020, Cron was released by the Diamondbacks organization and his rights were sold to a team in Nippon Professional Baseball.

=== Hiroshima Toyo Carp ===
On November 16, 2020, Cron officially agreed to a one-year, $1.1 million deal with the Hiroshima Toyo Carp of Nippon Professional Baseball. In 42 games, Cron hit 6 home runs and earned 16 RBIs while striking out 47 times. He became a free agent after the season.

=== SSG Landers ===
On December 4, 2021, Cron signed a one-year, $1 million deal with the SSG Landers of the KBO League. Cron played in 67 games for SSG, batting .222/.255/.420 with 11 home runs and 35 RBI. He was released on July 8, 2022.

=== Oakland Athletics ===
On November 3, 2022, Cron signed a minor league deal with the Oakland Athletics. He began the year with the Triple-A Las Vegas Aviators, playing in 10 games and hitting just .133/.152/.156 with no home runs and 6 RBI. He was released by the Athletics organization on May 1, 2023.

== Personal life ==
Cron's father, Chris Cron, was an MLB player and his brother C. J. Cron also played in MLB. The Crons are cousins with Chad Moeller. Chris managed Kevin with Reno in 2019.

== See also ==
- List of second-generation Major League Baseball players
