= Weedmaps =

American tech company

WeedMaps Technology, Inc.
- Type: Public
- Traded as: Nasdaq: MAPS
- Industry: Cannabis technology
- Founded: July 2008
- Headquarters: Orange County, California
- Key people: Chris Beals (CEO); Doug Francis (Chairman); Justin Hartfield (CoFounder); Steven Jung (COO); Juanjo Feijoo (CMO); Arden Lee (CFO); Justin Dean (CIO); Brian Camire (General Counsel)
- Products: Weedmaps.com; WM Orders; WM Exchange; WM Retail; MMJMenu
- Website: weedmaps.com

WeedMaps is an American tech company serving the cannabis industry, founded in 2008 by Justin Hartfield and Keith Hoerling.

Headquartered in Irvine, California, Weedmaps has more than 400 employees and has offices in Denver, Tucson, New York, Barcelona and Toronto. In March 2019, Chris Beals was named CEO of Weedmaps, replacing Doug Francis, who took responsibilities as Chairman of the company. As of October 2019, the company announced they would lay off approximately 25 percent of their workforce due to the slow introduction of recreational markets in California and Massachusetts.

== History ==
A 2009 New York Daily News article said of Weedmaps, "There's a new stoner's paradise on the Web" that is a website "where medical marijuana patients can connect with other patients in their area, to freely discuss and review local cannabis co-operatives and dispensaries." In November 2010 WeedMaps was acquired by General Cannabis Incorporated for an undisclosed amount. As part of acquisition, founder Justin Hartfield became WeedMaps' Chief Web Officer.

Although the company does not disclose revenue figures, some media outlets have reported historical sales estimates for the company. For example, a 2010 TechCrunch article reported that Weedmaps grew monthly revenue of $20,000 in 2009 to $400,000 per month in 2010, with approximately 50,000 registered users at the time.

In November 2011 Weedmaps acquired Marijuana.com for $4.2 million. The acquisition included the Marijuana.com domain name as well as all of the site's content.

In February 2013 General Cannabis sold all cannabis-related businesses, including WeedMaps, back to the original founders.

In June 2013, Hartfield and business partner and COO Doug Francis formally announced the formation of Ghost Group and its offspring, the Emerald Ocean Capital firm, the first marijuana Venture Capital firm to connect and invest through "Emerging Companies in Legal Cannabis and Medical Marijuana Sectors."

Also in June 2013, Business Insider dubbed Hartfield "The First Venture Capitalist of The Pot Industry."

=== Partnership with NORML ===
In October 2011, Weedmaps entered into an online partnership with NORML.org, helping to revamp the site. This partnership signified Weedmaps' effort to aid legalization efforts and take a more active approach within the marijuana community.

=== Weedmaps Museum of Weed ===
In August 2019, Weedmaps launched a 30,000 square-foot Museum of Weed in West Hollywood, "aimed at destigmatizing cannabis", telling the story of cannabis prohibition over the last century. The museum finished its three-month run at the end of October. There is no news on the next destination for the museum.

=== Public offering ===
In 2021, the Company went public via SPAC transaction with Stock Ticker $MAPS.

=== Acquisition of Sprout ===
In September 2021, Weedmaps acquired Sprout, a leading cannabis CRM and marketing software company, from Jaret Christopher and a group of investors for $29.6 million.

== Products and services ==
=== Weedmaps.com ===
Weedmaps.com provides adult use and medical marijuana dispensary locations (including updated menus and reviews), doctors' offices, brands, and delivery services throughout the United States and Canada. Consumers can also place online orders for products from dispensaries or delivery services via the site. The site also has sections for industry news, learning about cannabis and strain information. Other cannabis services listed on Weedmaps include Smokeland, which also publishes informational resources on cannabis use.

=== Weedmaps mobile applications ===
Weedmaps is the most widely used and downloaded marijuana mobile application on the Google Play and the Apple App Store. The application offers similar functionality to the website but does not allow ordering, due to Google and Apple's restrictions.

=== Wholesale Exchange ===
In April 2019, Weedmaps launched their wholesale exchange platform, WM Exchange. It is currently available in California and Oklahoma.

=== Weedmaps Layoffs ===
In 2022, Weedmaps had to lay off employees amidst a "tough stretch" for the cannabis-reviews site. Weedmaps CEO Chris Beals stepped down from his office in November 2022. Weedmaps still remains a top cannabis platform despite its layoffs.

=== Point of sale system ===
In December 2011, Weedmaps acquired MMJMenu, a Denver-based software entity that "provides back-end enterprise software for medical marijuana dispensaries. The software handles everything from patient management to inventory control to checkout at point of sale." MMJMenu allows medical marijuana businesses to track their sales and revenue from seed to sale, servicing medical marijuana states such as California, Colorado, Washington, and Michigan.

In September 2019, Weedmaps announced the launch of its own point-of-sale system, WM Retail, and announced live menu integrations for consumers using Cova or Meadow point-of-sale systems.

== Criticism and legality ==
=== Reviews ===
In 2016, a study by Fakespot found many reviews on the site to be suspicious. Weedmaps mistakenly leaked data showing that the majority of reviewers were from a small group of IPs that all gave good reviews of the site which means that individual users were leaving multiple reviews. An independent analysis of the text of reviews estimates that 62% of reviews are fake. Fakespot CSO Ming Ooi gave Weedmaps an F-grade.

As of 2020, Weedmaps has rolled out "Verified Reviews" and other automated review moderation solutions to improve review quality. Fakespot has to date not responded to requests for an updated audit.

=== Unlicensed dispensaries ===
After the passing of adult-use cannabis in California through Proposition 64, Weedmaps continued to list dispensaries that had previously advertised on the site, expecting they would receive licenses. Many in the industry criticized the decision to keep them on the site after the grace period for dispensaries that had been operating under Proposition 215 expired in early 2019. In August 2019, the company announced it would only allow state-licensed dispensaries to be advertised on the site, allowing clients until the end of the year to update their license information.
