= Jeremy Gable =

American playwright and game designer

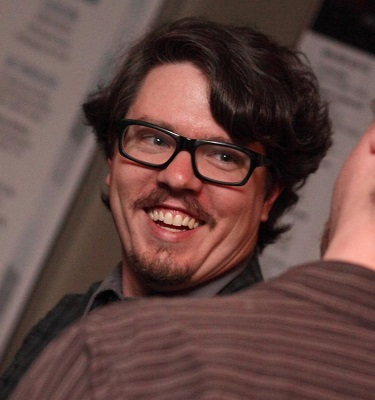
- Gable at Philadelphia Theatre Company, 2013
- Born: May 10, 1982 (age 44); Lakenheath, Suffolk, England
- Occupations: Playwright, game designer, game writer
- Writing career
- Notable works: D-Pad; American Way; Flying Spaghetti Monster plays 140: A Twitter Performance; Watch Me Jump

Jeremy Joseph Gable (born May 10, 1982) is an American playwright and game designer living in Philadelphia.

== Early life ==
Gable was born in Lakenheath, Suffolk, England. He grew up in Post Falls, Idaho, then moved to Barstow, California after graduation.

== Career ==
In July 2006, Gable wrote and produced Giant Green Lizard! The Musical, a musical parody of the Japanese monster movies from the 1950s, for the Maverick Theater Company in Fullerton, California. The show received a positive notice in the entertainment trade BackStage West, particularly noting its "inventive score" and "off-kilter sensibility".

Gable served as Artistic Director of the Hunger Artists Theatre Company from December 2006 to April 2009 where he directed the Orange County premieres of Sarah Kane's 4.48 Psychosis and Bryony Lavery's Frozen, as well as writing the Flying Spaghetti Monster plays, which were covered by the official Flying Spaghetti Monster website. He also wrote American Way, which made its premiere at Los Angeles' Blank Theatre, - and 140: A Twitter Performance, the first documented full-length fully original Twitter play. He was named "one of Orange County's most genuinely innovative theatrical minds" by OC Weekly and called "one of O.C.'s more fertile theatrical minds" by the Orange County Register.

After moving to Philadelphia, Gable wrote another Twitter play, The 15th Line, as well as the stage plays D-Pad, which was a finalist for the Eugene O'Neill Theater Center's National Playwrights Conference, and Go Ahead, which was presented at the National New Play Network's National Showcase of New Plays.

In 2018, Gable adapted his play Watch Me Jump into a video game, which was made available for PC, Mac, iOS, and Android. The game was nominated for an Independent Games Festival Award for Excellence in Narrative.

Gable is a co-founder of the feminist performance platform Ninth Planet.

== 2020 presidential campaign ==
In 2015, Gable submitted paperwork declaring an independent presidential run in 2020. He terminated his candidacy in 2017.

== Produced and published works ==
=== Stage ===
| Year | Title | Notes |
|---|---|---|
| 1999 | The Bench | Presented at the Spokane Civic Theatre's Playwrights Forum Festival |
| 2002 | Algor Mortis | Presented at the Blank Theatre Company's Young Playwrights Festival |
| 2004 | American Way | Produced by the Blank Theatre. Published by Original Works Publishing |
| 2006 | Giant Green Lizard! The Musical | Produced by the Maverick Theater. |
| 2006 | The Flying Spaghetti Monster Holiday Pageant | Produced by the Hunger Artists Theatre Company. |
| 2007 | Re: Woyzeck | Produced by the Hunger Artists Theatre Company. |
| 2008 | Flying Spaghetti Monster: The Holy Mug of Grog | Produced by the Hunger Artists Theatre Company. |
| 2009 | 140: A Twitter Performance | Premiered on Twitter. |
| 2010 | The 15th Line | Premiered on Twitter. |
| 2011 | Revolution and a Sandwich | Produced by the Shakedown Project. |
| 2012 | Star Wars: A New Musical Hope | Book of a musical. Produced by Bootless Stageworks. |
| 2013 | Bad Monster | Presented at Theatre Exile's Studio X-hibition Series. |
| 2014 | Dream House: A Rainy Day Play | Produced by Plays and Players Theatre. Published by YouthPLAYS. |
| 2015 | 901 Nowhere Street | Produced by Sam Tower + Ensemble. |
| 2016 | Nowhere Fast | Produced by Sam Tower + Ensemble and BRAT Productions. |
| 2017 | Watch Me Jump | Presented at Theatre Exile's Studio X-hibition Series. |
| 2017 | Particular Risk | Produced by Bryn Mawr College. |
| 2017 | Go Ahead | Presented at the Great Plains Theatre Conference and the National New Play Network's National Showcase of New Plays. |
| 2017 | Hero School | Produced by Theatre Horizon. |
| 2017 | Strange Tenants | Produced by Sam Tower + Ensemble. |
| 2018 | The Idaho Shuffle | Produced by Simpatico Theatre. |
| 2018 | Homeworld | Story Editor. Produced by Ninth Planet. |
| 2020 | D-Pad | Produced by Theatre Exile and presented at the Great Plains Theatre Conference. |

=== Video games ===
| Year | Title | Notes |
|---|---|---|
| 2018 | Watch Me Jump | Released for PC, Mac, iOS, and Android. |

== See also ==
- List of playwrights
- List of people from Philadelphia, Pennsylvania
- List of people from Fullerton, California
- List of people from Idaho
