= Heartfield (surname) =

Heartfield is a surname. Notable people with the surname include:

- James Heartfield (born 1961), British journalist
- John Heartfield (1891–1961), German photographer
- Thad Heartfield (1940–2022), United States judge

== See also ==
- Hartfield (disambiguation)
