= Kate Levering =

American actress and dancer (born 1979)

- Born: January 3, 1979 (age 47); Sacramento, California, U.S.
- Occupation: Actress
- Years active: 1998–2016
- Spouse: Reza Jahangiri (m. 2013)
- Children: 2

External image
- Kate Levering in August 2010

Kate Levering (born January 3, 1979) is an American actress and dancer. She was nominated for a Tony Award for her role in the 2001 musical 42nd Street. She is best known for her role as Kim Kaswell in the Lifetime comedy-drama series Drop Dead Diva.

== Life and career ==
Levering was born in Sacramento, California. Levering attended El Camino Fundamental High School, where she took part in school musicals and dance classes before graduating in 1997 and leaving for New York City to pursue a career on Broadway. In 2001 she was cast as Peggy Sawyer in the revival of 42nd Street. She was nominated for the Tony Award for Best Featured Actress in a Musical category and won the Fred Astaire Award for Best Female Dancer for her tap dancing in the show. She only performed the role on Broadway for a short three-month period, and is featured on the cast album, but is not taped for Lincoln Center Archives.

Levering left 42nd Street to star in the notorious Broadway flop Thou Shalt Not, composed by Harry Connick, Jr., and choreographed by Susan Stroman.

On television, Levering has made guest appearances on shows such as Home Improvement, Law & Order: Special Victims Unit, Cold Case (episode: "Dog Day Afternoons") and Witchblade. In 2002, she played the role of Jeanne Martin in the TV movie Martin and Lewis, starring Sean Hayes and Jeremy Northam. In 2004 she played whip-smart attorney Veronica Carter on the UPN series Kevin Hill, starring Taye Diggs. Although critically acclaimed, the show was canceled in 2005 after only one season. Kate has had guest roles in CSI: Miami ("The Score" (2006)), Las Vegas (2007), Medium (2007), K-Ville (2007), Ghost Whisperer (2007), Cashmere Mafia (four episodes 2008), NCIS (2010), and White Collar (2010).

From 2009 to 2014, Levering played the role of Kim Kaswell in Lifetime's comedy-drama series Drop Dead Diva. Levering also has starred in independent films: Like Dandelion Dust in 2009, and Breaking the Girls in 2012.

In 2016, Levering was cast as the adult Annette Hargrove in the NBC drama Cruel Intentions, based on the 1999 film of same name. The role was played by Reese Witherspoon in the film.

== Personal life ==
Levering married businessman Reza Jahangiri on April 20, 2013 at The Beverly Hills Hotel. Their son, Holden Robert Jahangiri, was born in July 2013. Kate's pregnancy was written into her role on Drop Dead Diva. In March 2016, Levering announced that she had given birth to a second son.

== Filmography ==
Year	Title	Role	Notes
1999	Home Improvement	Girl	Episode: "Neighbors"
2001	The Lullaby of Broadway: Opening Night on 42nd Street	Peggy Sawyer	TV movie
2002	Witchblade	Lucrezia Borgia	Episode: "Ubique"
2002	Law & Order: Special Victims Unit	Kittie	Episode: "Lust"
2002	Martin and Lewis	Jeanne Martin	
2003	Hotel	Natalie	TV Pilot
2004–05	Kevin Hill	Veronica Carter	Series regular, 22 episodes
2005	Out of Practice	Jennifer	Episode: "New Year's Eve"
2006	CSI: Miami	Heather Larkin / Karen Manning	Episode: "The Score"
2006	The Hunters	Addison Cole	TV Pilot
2006	Cold Case	Darla Dunaway	Episode: "Dog Day Afternoons"
2007	Las Vegas	Nicole	Episode: "Fleeting Cheating Meeting"
2007	Close to Home	Tess Middleton	Episode: "Barren"
2007	Medium	Dr. Elizabeth Randall	Episode: "Whatever Possessed You"
2007	K-Ville	Christina Dubois	Episode: "Pilo"
2007	Ghost Whisperer	Gina Prince	Episode: "Haunted Hero"
2008	Blue Blood	Colt	TV Pilot
2008	Cashmere Mafia	Katherine Cutler	Recurring role, 4 episodes
2009	Like Dandelion Dust	Molly Campbell	
2009–14	Drop Dead Diva	Kim Kaswell	Series regular, 70 episodes
2010	White Collar	Grace Quinn	Episode: "Bottlenecked"
2010	NCIS: Los Angeles	Jillian Leigh	Episode: "Anonymous"
2013	Breaking the Girls	Nina Layton	
2013	Chlorine	Devon Stone	
2016	Cruel Intentions	Annette Hargrove-Casey	Unaired pilot
