= American Way (play) =

2004 play by Jeremy Gable

American Way is a 2004 one-act play by Jeremy Gable. The plot centers on three comic book superheroes who, in the midst of a break, are faced with a tragedy that they could not prevent from happening, despite having superpowers. It is notable for its sudden shift in tone and use of metaphor to mirror the policies of the Bush administration after 9/11. The show opened in October 2004 at The Blank Theatre in Los Angeles, California
