= Ghost Group =

Ghost Management Group, LLC
- Type: Private
- Industry: Venture capital
- Founded: Irvine, California (2012)
- Founder: Justin Hartfield; Doug Francis
- Headquarters: Irvine, California, United States

Ghost Management Group, LLC is a venture capital company based in Irvine, California focused on cannabis.

== Overview ==
The firm was founded in 2012 by Justin Hartfield and Doug Francis.

Ghost Group targets accredited businesses and investors that are either already involved or have shown interest in becoming involved in the legal cannabis industry.

In June 2013 the firm announced the launch of Emerald Ocean Capital fund. The market of consumer-facing products, especially software and technologies, will be the focus of Emerald Ocean. After announcing the launch of the fund, Emerald Ocean expressed intentions of raising 10 to 25 million dollars in its first round.

Additionally, the capital fund will function as a venture capital incubator, with an 8,000 square foot office facility in Denver, Colorado for select startups.

Ghost Group concurrently announced the launch of Ghost Domain Capital, an investment firm specializing in Internet domains.
