= Blank Theatre Company =

Non-profit theatre in Los Angeles, California, U.S.

The Blank Theatre Company
- Address: Hollywood, California; United States
- Type: Regional

Construction
- Opened: 1990

Website
- www.theblank.com

The Blank Theatre Company is a non-profit theatre company located in Los Angeles, California.

== History ==
The Blank Theatre Company was founded in 1990 by artistic director/Co-Artistic Producer Daniel Henning, who stepped down in 2022, The Blank's mission is to produce either premieres or "reinventions" of previously produced material.

In 1992, the theatre began an annual Nationwide Young Playwrights Festival, which has provided an outlet for the creative efforts of over 200 playwrights aged nineteen and younger. Notable alumni of the festival include Pulitzer Prize nominee and 2016 Tony winner for The Humans, Stephen Karam and Jake in Progress creator Austin Winsberg.

The Blank also produces the "Living Room Series", a workshop series of mostly new works. The series culminates in a Monday night performance and is presented nearly every Monday night from Labor Day to Memorial Day. The LRS has developed 600 new plays over the past 25+ years. Many of the scripts have gone on to receive productions and accolades at venues including Manhattan Theatre Club, Laguna Playhouse and Brideswell Theatre in London. In fact, The Explorer's Club by Nell Benjamin went on to win the NY Outer Critics Circle Award for Outstanding New Off-Broadway Play, A Singular They by Aliza Goldstein won the Ted Schmitt Award for World Premiere of an Outstanding New Play, and Heads by EM Lewis won the Francesca Primus Prize.

In April 1996, the company moved to its current home at the 53-seat 2nd Stage Theatre in Hollywood, California, at 6500 Santa Monica Blvd.

== Awards ==
The Blank Theatre Company has received numerous Los Angeles theater awards, including six Los Angeles Drama Critics Circle Awards and three LA Weekly Awards.

== Personnel ==
- Daniel Henning - Artistic Director/Producer (1990-2022)
- Noah Wyle - Artistic Producer (1998 - 2008)

== Notable alumni ==
- Ed Asner
- Amber Benson
- Nicholas Brendon
- Warren Davis
- Eliza Dushku
- Susan Egan
- Sarah Michelle Gellar
- Alyson Hannigan
- Sally Kellerman
- James Kerwin
- Richard Kind
- Ricki Lake
- Matthew Lillard
- Allison Mack
- James Marsters
- Debra Messing
- Molly Shannon
- Sherri Shepherd
- Kate Shindle
- Bruce Vilanch
- Gedde Watanabe
- Mae Whitman
- Noah Wyle
- Constance Zimmer

== Mainstage productions ==
- The Tragedy of JFK (as told by Wm. Shakespeare) (World Premiere) 2016
- Set Up and Punch (World Premiere) 2009
- The Jazz Age (West Coast Premiere) 2009
- Speech and Debate (West Coast Premiere) 2008
- Little Fish (West Coast Premiere) 2007
- Heads (World Premiere) 2007
- Missouri Waltz (World Premiere) 2007
- Hotel C'est L'Amour (World Premiere) 2006
- Lobster Alice (Los Angeles Premiere) 2006
- A Hole in the Wall (West Coast Premiere) 2006
- The Wild Party (West Coast Premiere) 2005
- The Book of Liz (Los Angeles Premiere) 2005
- Les Liaisons Dangereuses 2005
- American Way (World Premiere) 2004
- As Is 2004
- Funny... (2 World Premieres) 2003
- Fill in the Blank (World Premiere) 2003
- Sanguine (World Premiere) 2003
- Who's Afraid of Virginia Woolf? 2002
- First Lady Suite (West Coast Premiere) 2002
- Precious Sons (West Coast Premiere) 2000
- The Why (World Premiere) 2000
- A Night Out With Young Playwrights (2 World Premieres) 1999
- Starr Struck: A Musical Investigation (World Premiere) 1999
- Hello Again (West Coast Premiere) 1998
- Loot 1997
- Sky's End (World Premiere) 1996
- Breaking the Code (L.A. premiere) 1996
- Young Playwrights Mainstage 95 (3 World Premieres) 1995
- Chess (L.A. Premiere) 1995
- The Cradle Will Rock (Off Ramp Theatre) 1994
- Gertrude Stein and A Companion (L.A. Premiere) 1994
- In Stitches (World Premiere) 1994
- Isn't It Romantic? 1993
- The Fantasticks 1993
- A Snake in the Vein (West Coast Premiere) 1993
- Sexual Perversity in Chicago / Hills Like White Elephants 1991
- The Winter's Tale 1991
- Hosanna 1990
