= Reza Jahangiri =

American businessman (born 1978)

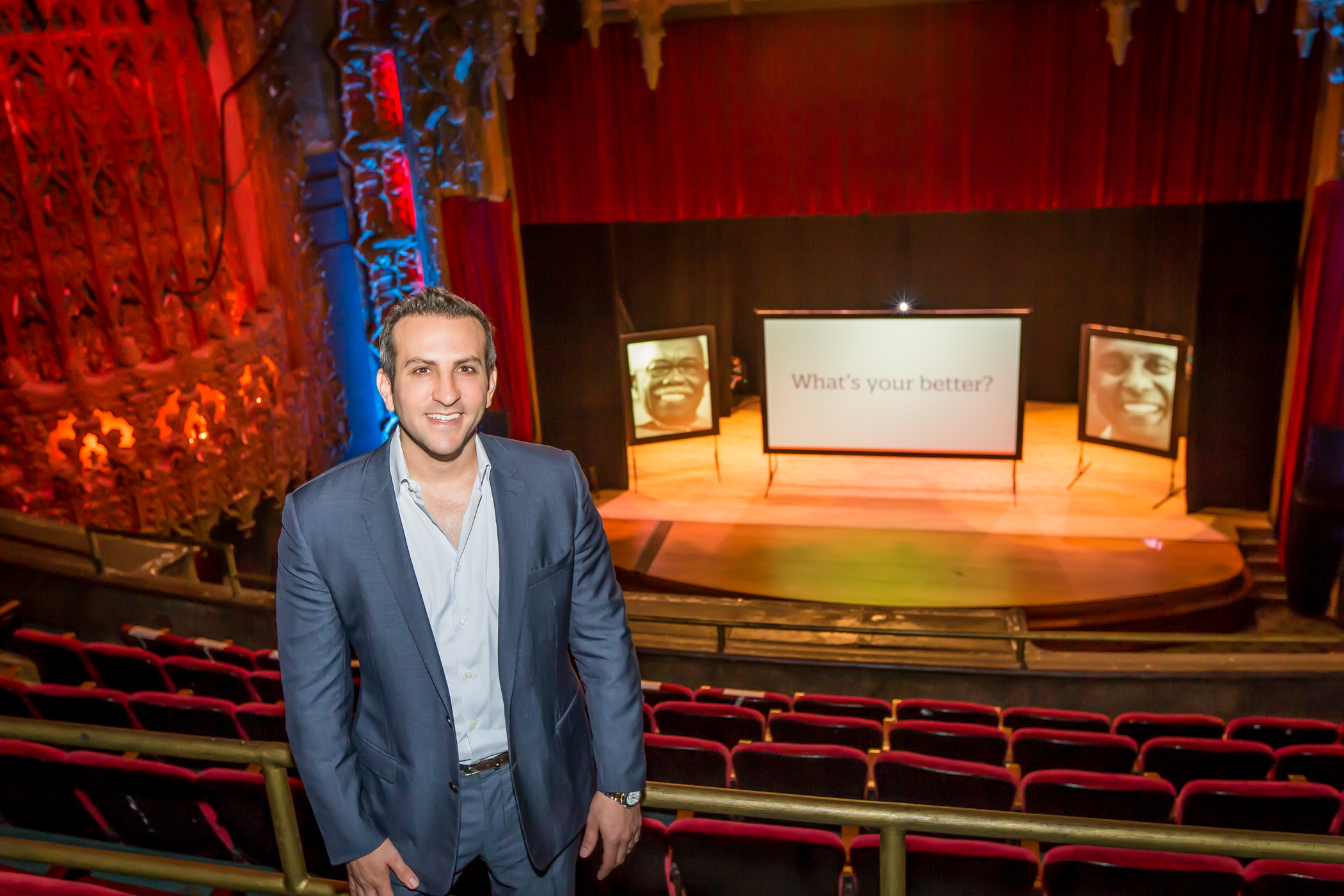
- Jahangiri on set for "Retire Better" TV spot
- Born: June 9, 1978 (age 48)
- Occupation: CEO of American Advisors Group
- Spouse: Kate Levering (m. 2013)
- Children: 3

Reza Jahangiri (born June 9, 1978) is an American entrepreneur. He is the CEO of American Advisors Group (AAG) and past co-chair of the National Reverse Mortgage Lenders Association (NRMLA). He was also senior publisher for The Reverse Review until it was sold to HousingWire in 2018.

== Education ==
Jahangiri graduated from the University of California, Irvine with a Bachelor of Science degree in Economics in 2000, and went on to obtain his Juris Doctor from Loyola Marymount University in Los Angeles in 2004. He graduated from Corona del Mar high school in Newport Beach, CA, in 1997.

== Early career ==
Prior to his involvement in the reverse mortgage industry, Jahangiri was a founding partner of HeartSavers, a preventative medical imaging company that worked with Johns Hopkins Hospital on the early detection of heart disease and cancer. He was also responsible for launching Imaging Venture Group, a healthcare consulting company that supplied medical equipment to private medical practices.

== Career ==
In 2004, Jahangiri became founder and CEO of American Advisors Group (AAG), a reverse mortgage lending company based in Orange County, CA. He started AAG to help address the financial crisis of a growing 65-and-older population by utilizing an underutilized asset, home equity. In 2010, AAG launched its Fred Thompson campaign, signing on the famous politician and actor as their national spokesperson. Thompson died on November 1, 2015, at the age of 73 from a recurrence of lymphoma. AAG announced in June 2016, Golden Globe and Emmy Award-winning actor, Tom Selleck, as their new national spokesperson.

In December 2021, Jahangiri was interviewed by the Orange County Business Journal when AAG was selected as a "Company That Cares.". In 2017, Jahangiri reported to Forbes that AAG had been profitable for seven consecutive years. Also in 2017, Jahangiri was interviewed by the Orange County Register for an article profiling AAG's rise in the reverse mortgage industry. The following year, Jahangiri was interviewed by HousingWire about AAG's expansion into conventional and FHA refinance loans, as well as real estate services for the senior demographic.

In 2018, Jahangiri received Ernst & Young's Entrepreneur Of The Year® Award in the financial services category in Orange County. That same year, he was named to the Orange County Business Journal's OC 500 list, honoring the most influential individuals in Orange County. The following year, in 2019, Jahangiri was honored with an Excellence in Entrepreneurship Award by the Orange County business community.

== Industry affiliations ==
Jahangiri is an active member of the National Reverse Mortgage Lenders Association (NRMLA), serving as the past co-chair of the organization's board of directors . NRMLA is the national voice of the reverse mortgage industry, serving as an educational resource, policy advocate and public affairs center for lenders and related professionals. In 2017, Jahangiri joined the University of California, Irvine Chief Executive Roundtable. The Roundtable was established by UCI in 1986 as a gateway to the mutually beneficial cooperation and knowledge transfer between the business community and the university. In 2021, Jahangiri joined the Executive Committee of the CEO Leadership Alliance Orange County (CLA-OC), an organization that brings together purposeful CEOs to help build high performing organizations and a better world. .

== Humanitarian efforts ==
In 2011, Jahangiri created the AAG Gives Back campaign, a committee dedicated to supporting various local and global charities. Willow International, became the anchor program for AAG Gives Back after Jahangiri's visit to Gulu, Uganda in August 2011. Willow International is a nonprofit organization that was founded in Uganda in 2009. The organization is dedicated to preventing human trafficking, rescuing victims, and providing aftercare for survivors. The AAG Foundation launched in 2015, as the AAG Gives Back campaign evolved, and focuses on helping those in need and encouraging the workforce to make a difference.

== Personal life ==
Jahangiri married actress Kate Levering on April 20, 2013 at The Beverly Hills Hotel. They have three sons, Holden Robert, born in July 2013, Greyson Robert, born in September 2015, and Ashton Robert, born July 2018.
