= American Advisors Group =

American Advisors Group, In
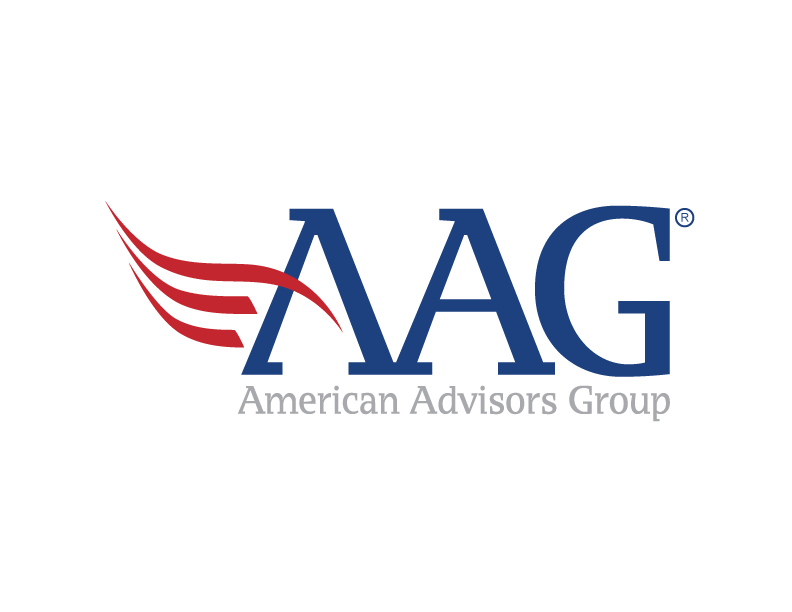
- Founded: Irvine, California, USA (2004)
- Headquarters: 18200 Von Karman Ave., Suite 300; Irvine, California 92612; United States
- Key people: Reza Jahangiri, CEO/Founder
- Employees: 1000+ (2015)
- Website: www.aag.com

American Advisors Group (AAG) is an American reverse mortgage lender. AAG specializes in Home Equity Conversion Mortgage (HECM) loans and has 81 geographical areas approved for business by United States Department of Housing and Urban Development.

== History ==
The American Advisors Group was founded in 2004 by Reza Jahangiri, president and chief executive officer.

In June 2009, the company received a capital-infusion commitment from private-equity firm JAM Equity Partners of El Segundo, California, an investment said to give AAG "the resources needed to compete on a national level with a celebrity spokesperson and [to] build a recognizable brand." At the same time, the company announced "a new management team" from Liberty Reverse Mortgage/Genworth and the Senior Lending Network. Jahangiri told Reverse Mortgage Daily that the company would be "sticking with retail" rather than moving to other aspects of the business.

The firm completed its first Home Mortgage-Backed Security (HMBS) issuance in July 2013, after receiving approval from Ginnie Mae, in a program said to be "an essential financial solution for a growing number of senior citizens.". The company was named as the leading HMBS issuer for the first half of 2015, according to NewView Advisors, LLC.

== Scope ==
AAG provides government-insured Home Equity Conversion Mortgage (HECM) loans and has 81 HUD-approved areas for business. The organization is headquartered in Orange County, California.

The firm launched its wholesale division in June 2012. It launched its National Field Sales (NFS) division in 2014.

== Marketing ==
=== Spokespeople ===
In October 2009, the firm announced that film and television actor Peter Graves had been selected as the spokesperson for the second half of the company's national media campaign, which in its first phase had featured "personalized stories" of the way that reverse mortgages had affected homeowners. He remained spokesman until his death in March 2010.

Fred Thompson, actor and Tennessee Senator from 1994 to 2005, became AAG an spokesman in May 2010 until his death on November 1, 2015. In 2021, the firm named Tom Selleck as a spokesperson.
