= Shaun Butler =

American BMX rider

Personal information
- Born: Goldie LeShaun Butler; June 29, 1976 Fullerton, California, U.S.

Cycling career
- Sport: Cycling
- Discipline: BMX racing
- Role: Rider

Shaun Butler (born Goldie LeShaun Butler; June 19, 1976 in Fullerton) is an American BMX rider. Also known as the "Michael Jordan of BMX", he is an 3X XGAMES BMX Professional Athlete, and MTV Sports Music Festival Winner.

He was born to Gwen Butler on June 29, 1976, in Fullerton, California. Butler has been riding professionally since 1993, and is one of ten professionals featured in the Dave Mirra games on PlayStation and PlayStation 2. His sponsors include Vans Shoes, DC Shoes, Airwalk, Puma, Fox Racing, Acclaim Entertainment and Bell Sports. He was voted as one of the Top 25 Most Influential Riders of the 90's Ride BMX.
