= Ray Grainger =

American businessman

- Born: Raymond Grainger; 1961/62
- Occupation: Businessman
- Known for: co-founder and CEO of Mavenlink
- Children: 2

Raymond "Ray" Grainger is the co-founder and CEO of the tech startup Mavenlink.

== Early life and education ==
Grainger was born and raised in California. After graduating high school he worked as a field assistant for the National Science Foundation, and took part in two expeditions to the South Pole in 1979. He received an engineering degree from Harvey Mudd College in 1988. During college he worked for a health care company. After graduating college he worked as an information technology consultant at Accenture, where he remained for 17 years, eventually becoming Global Managing Partner. During these years he invested in several companies, among others in InQuira, which was acquired by Oracle in 2012. In 2005 Grainger left Accenture and became an executive at InQuira, a startup that develops call-center management software. He was an Executive Vice President of the company. After three years he left InQuira to start Mavenlink.

In 2008 Grainger founded Mavenlink together with Roger Neel as CTO and Sean Crafts as CGO.

== Personal life ==
Grainger was a 2017 finalist for Orange County's Entrepreneur of the Year. He is an emeritus member of the Harvey Mudd College Board of Trustees.

Grainger was married for 34 years. He has two grown children, a son and daughter.
