= Ronne Hartfield =

American author, essayist and museum consultant

- Ronne Hartfield
- Born: Ronola Rone; March 17, 1936 (age 90); Chicago, Illinois, US
- Education: University of Chicago
- Spouse: Robert Hartfield
- Children: 4

Ronne Hartfield (born March 17, 1936) is an American author, essayist, and museum-education consultant.

== Early life and education ==
Ronne Hartfield was born on March 17, 1936, to John Drayton Rone and Thelma Shepherd (née Day) in Chicago, Illinois. She attended Wendell Phillips High School in the Bronzeville neighborhood of Chicago.

Hartfield earned a Bachelor of Arts degree in History in 1955 and a Master of Arts in Theology and Literature in 1986, both from the University of Chicago.

== Career ==
Hartfield's first job after college was with Science Research Associates as an editorial assistant. Later on she started to do public relations work for the Chicago Children's Choir. She was Project Director of Urban Gateways: The Centre for Arts in Education, a Chicago-based arts and education non-profit organization.

From 1974-1981, Hartfield was the Dean of Students and Assistant Professor of comparative literature at the School of the Art Institute of Chicago. She also taught at Northwestern University and the University of Illinois, Chicago.

In 1981, she returned to Urban Gateways as Executive Director.

From 1991-1999, Hartfield was member of the Woman's Board Endowed Executive Director of Museum Education at the Art Institute of Chicago. In 1994, she helped establish the Leadership Advisory Committee, which aims to engage African Americans in the life of the institution and promotes diversity. Hartfield also worked as a consultant for the Rockefeller Foundation and the National Endowment for the Arts.

Hartfield’s memoir, Another Way Home: The Tangled Roots of Race in One Chicago Family, examines race and identity through the story of her mother, Day Shepherd. Another Way Home received a review in the Chicago Tribune.

After her early retirement from the Art Institute of Chicago in 1999, Hartfield was appointed as a Senior Research Fellow at the Center for the Study of World Religions at Harvard Divinity School (2001–2002), where her research focused on intersections of art and religion in public life.

Hartfield later worked as an international consultant with the National Endowment for the Arts and the Institute of Museum and Library Services and led cultural exchange projects in Germany, Brazil, Mexico, and Japan.

In 2016, Hartfield participated in the Enhancing Life Project at the University of Chicago, publishing essays on the role of the arts in enhancing human flourishing.

== Publications ==
In addition to her memoir Another Way Home (2004), Hartfield contributed entries to the Encyclopedia of Chicago (2004) and essays in Stewards of the Sacred (2004). She also presented research on art and spirituality in international venues such as the Eranos Yearbook in Switzerland.

== Honors and awards ==
Hartfield received the Lifetime Achievement Award from the National Women’s Caucus for the Arts and the Sor Juana Award for Lifetime Achievement in the Arts from the National Museum of Mexican Art in Chicago.

In 2001, she was the inaugural recipient of the Jessie Woods Arts Champion Award from Urban Gateways.

== Personal ==
Hartfield is married to mathematician Robert Hartfield. They have four daughters.

== Selected service on boards and committees ==
- American Writers Museum, Writer, Museum Consultant
- Fetzer Institute, Kalamazoo, MI, Convener, Arts Advisory Council
- Frank Lloyd Wright Foundation, Taliesin, Scottsdale, AZ, Board of Directors
- Harvard University Graduate Division of Arts Education, Co-Chair Board of Directors
- University of Chicago Women's Board, Steering Committee
- University of Chicago, Interlocutor, International Enhancing Life Project
- Institute for the Advanced Study of Religion, Martin Marty Center, University of Chicago
- Rhode Island School of Design, Honorary Life Trustee
- Gaylord and Dorothy Donnelley Foundation, Chicago
- The Chicago Network, Vice President
- Columbia College Chicago, Board of Directors
- International Sculpture Center, New York City, Trustee
- National Museum of Women in the Arts, Illinois Chapter
- National Women's Caucus for Art
- ArtTable, New York City, Vice President

== Selected publications ==
- 1985 - Gifts of Power/The Writings of Rebecca Jackson. Book Review in The Journal of Religion, v. 65, No. 2 April 2
- 1988 - An Unquiet Revolution. Essay in The Journal of Arts Management, Spring
- 1993 - Teaching Theater. Keynote Speech. The Journal of the American Educational Theater Association, New York
- 1994 - Challenging the Context: Perception, Polity and Power. Essay in Curator: The Museum Journal, v. 37 No. 1
- 1995 - Birmingham Museum of Art, Fall Catalog. Essay for museum installation by sculptor Lorenzo Pace
- 1995 - Turning the Museum Inside Out. Essay in The Journal of Arts Education, September
- 1995 - The Artist in Society: Afterword. Essay in New Art Examiner, Summer
- 1996 - The Chicago Years: Gathering Light in the Gray City. Essay in Gullah Images: The Art of Jonathan Green (University of South Carolina Press)
- 1998 - The New Jersey State Museum, African American Fine Arts Collection Catalog, Trenton. Five essays
- 2001 - A Permanence of Stone and Language in America's Courtyard. Catalog essay: Perez and Milan. (Ripasa, São Paulo)
- 2001 - Encountering Art/Different Facets of the Esthetic Experience. Miho Museum, Kyoto. Essay (Overlook Press NY)
- 2004 - The Encyclopedia of Chicago History (University of Chicago Press). Two entries
- 2004 - Seeing and Silence: Sacred Encounter in Museum Exhibition. Essay in Stewards of the Sacred (American Association of Museums)
- 2004 - Musings on Barbarous Beauty. Fellowship conference proceedings (Harvard University Center for the Study of World Religions)
- 2004 - Another Way Home: The Tangled Roots of Race in One Chicago Family. Biographical Memoir (University of Chicago Press)
- 2006 - Laying Coping Stones in Zion: Art, the Imagination, and the Flourishing of Common Life. Essay in Criterion (University of Chicago Divinity School v.45 No. 1)
- 2007 - Architects of Culture. Interview with Tim Gilfoyle in Chicago History, the Magazine of the Chicago History Museum. Summer issue
- 2010 - Foreword: Catalogue for SAIC/SSCAC exhibition, Recession.
- 2010 - Journal of Ordinary Thought, Neighborhood Writing Alliance, Chicago. Introduction.
- 2012 - Visual Echoes and Evocations: Essay in Eranos Yearbook v.70. Daimon Verlag, Einsiedeln, Ticino, Italy.
- 2013 - Manifest Grace: Art, Presence, and Healing: Catalogue Essay in Body and Soul, Museum of Art and Design: New York City
- 2014 - Essay in Conference Publication, the Institute for Signifying Scriptures, Claremont, California
- 2016 - The Arts Enhance Life in Excelsis: Essay, websites of The University of Chicago Enhancing Life Project and the Chicago Symphony Orchestra
- 2019 - Essay in The Horn Book Magazine, v. XCV No. 4, American Library Association

== Honors and awards ==
- Urban Gateways Inaugural Jessie Woods Arts Champion Award for Arts Advocacy
- 2001–2002 Senior Research Fellow at the Center for the Study of World Religions (CSWR), Harvard Divinity School
- Rockefeller Foundation Bellagio Residency Fellowship
- DePaul University, Honorary Doctorate in Humane Letters
- Aspen Institute Residency Fellowships
- Robert Maynard Hutchins Award for Distinction in Education (Chicago History Museum)
- National Women's Caucus for the Arts, Lifetime Achievement Award
- Hull House Women of Valor Award
- University of Chicago Alumni Award for Public Service
- Goethe-Institut Travel Fellowship to Germany
- Brazil Cultural Consortium Travel Fellowship
- Mexico/Chicago Fellowship, City of Chicago Leadership Committee
- Institute for International Education, Women Leaders Delegation to Japan
- YWCA Outstanding Leadership in the Arts Award
- Congressman Sidney Yates Award for Outstanding Contributions to the Arts
- Scholarship and Guidance Association Award for Exceptional Community Service
- American Women Composers Award
- Lawyers For the Creative Arts Award for Exceptional Contributions
- International Women Associates, Woman Extraordinaire
- Christopher Moore Award, Chicago Children's Choir
- Woman of the Year, Chicago Association of Mannequins
- Distinguished Service Award, Alpha Gamma Pi Honorary Sorority
- Community Leadership Award, Abraham Lincoln Center
- Professional Excellence Award, League of Black Women
- Kizzy Award for Exceptional Achievement
- Named One of Ten Chicagoans to Watch by The Chicago Sun-Times
- Named One of 100 Most Outstanding Chicago Women by Today's Chicago Woman
- National Museum of Mexican Art: Sor Juana Award for Lifetime Achievement in the Arts
- African American Arts Alliance of Chicago: Outstanding Achievement in Non-Fiction Literature
