= Justin Hartfield =

American entrepreneur and venture capitalist

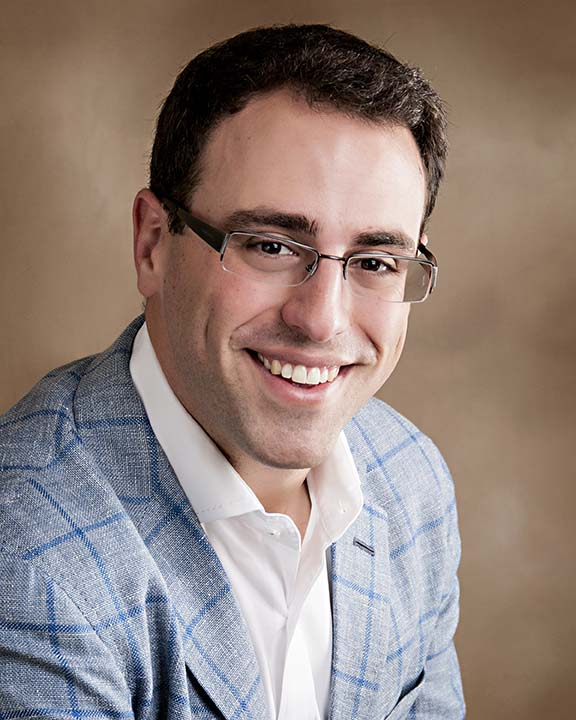
- Headshot of marijuana entrepreneur Justin Hartfield. Taken in 2013.
- Occupation: Influencer
- Known for: co-founder of WeedMaps
- Children: 1

Justin Hartfield is an entrepreneur and venture capitalist from Orange County, California. He is a co-founder and general partner at the Ghost Group venture capital firm and was the CEO at WeedMaps before stepping down in 2016 to pursue other ventures.

== Career ==
Born to a Jewish family, Hartfield founded WeedMaps in 2008 while working at a search engine optimization (SEO) consultation business. WeedMaps allows medical marijuana collectives to rate their own marijuana dispensaries. Under Hartfield, WeedMaps grew to nearly two million monthly visitors with a monthly revenue of $1.5 million. Hartfield served as the first CEO of the company until 2016 when he stepped down but remained board chairman of the company.

Hartfield founded the privately held Ghost Group in 2012 and serves as the company’s CEO. Through Ghost Group, Hartfield and his business partner Doug Francis launched Emerald Ocean Capital, a venture capital firm in the legal marijuana industry.

In addition to Hartfield’s work in the legal cannabis industry, he has also filled roles as a marketing and search engine optimization expert. From 2010 to 2012, he was the Chief web officer at the publicly traded SearchCore, Inc.

== Board positions and contributions to the industry ==
Justin Hartfield resides on the boards of National Organization for the Reform of Marijuana Laws (NORML) and the Marijuana Policy Project. He contributed over $100,000 to the Measure F campaign, which advocates for an open market system for marijuana sales.
