= Sigma (Overwatch) =

Overwatch character

- Overwatch character
- Sigma's appearance in Overwatch
- First game: Overwatch (2019)
- Designed by: Qiu Fang
- Voiced by: Boris Hiestand

In-universe information
- Class: Tank
- Nationality: Dutch

Sigma is the alias of Siebren de Kuiper, a character who first appeared in a 2019 update for the video game Overwatch, a Blizzard Entertainment–developed first-person hero shooter, and the resulting franchise. Designed by artist Qiu Fang, he was introduced in a 2019 update for the title. An extremely tall Dutch man, Sigma is an astrophysicist who suffered psychological damage due to an experiment with a black hole, but as a result gained the ability to manipulate gravity. He was later discovered and recruited by the terrorist group Talon, though is unaware that they are manipulating him to their own ends.

While Sigma's design was well received at first, the revelation that he suffered from mental illness, and moreso how his character's design played into this aspect, received complaints from various media outlets and mental health advocacy groups. This led to some questioning the necessity of emphasizing it within the game's story, while others observed it through the scope of their own mental issues. This further raised questions regarding Blizzard's approach to Overwatch and its dedication to representation within the game, and a reminder for others of the stigma such individuals face in real life.

== Conception and development ==
Several designs were considered for both Sigma and his weapon early on, with several concepts incorporating a tail.

After the introduction of the character Baptiste to Overwatch, Blizzard Entertainment's development team wanted to explore the idea of an "evil" tank-type character. In addition they wanted to introduce another "anchor tank" to the game in the vein of their character Reinhardt, someone who could create shields and act as a vanguard for their team to build around. They originally considered Mauga, a character introduced in Baptiste's backstory associated with the game's terrorist group, Talon. However, when developing Mauga's gameplay they found it did not fit the aesthetic they had in mind for a character they wanted to portray as someone that would frequently attack enemies head on. Though they considered several ideas, including the concept of Mauga punching out barriers, they instead went for a different approach.

Keeping the theme of a character associated with Talon, they developed the concept of another scientist associated with the organization to help flesh out both it and another character, Moira. Creating the character Sigma, they considered both magnetic and gravitational powers. They ultimately went with the later, being mindful to make his gameplay different from other characters in the game that had similar abilities. Sigma was originally envisioned as a muscular character for his design, with several iterations revolving around this concept armed with a variety of weaponry including several large cannons. Other aspects such as a tail were also considered complete with matching gameplay elements before being cut. However, designer Qiu Fang wanted to emphasize a tall, thinner appearance to deviate from how tank characters are normally portrayed as large and bulky, illustrating a character that uses their power to protect instead of physique. To help Sigma's design keep in line with the visual expectations for a tank character, he was given heavy armor covering parts of his body.

=== Design ===
Sigma stands roughly 8 feet tall. His outfit consists of a jumpsuit that leaves his toes and heel exposed; grey and black armor plating across his hips and torso, with turquoise armor on his upper chest. His shoulders and arms are covered in large green spiked shoulder pads and gauntlets, with the later hovering off his shoulders. Similar armor hovers around the back of his shaved head. Meanwhile, several cables connect the various pieces of armor, some of them glowing. In Overwatch 2, Sigma's armor was simplified, now taking on a silver appearance and losing elements such as the protrusions on his hips.

His armor was meant to help keep him in line with the visual expectations for a tank character, although this caused concerns of Sigma looking like a robot or cyborg. As Sigma perpetually floats over the ground, game director Jeff Kaplan asked if it was even necessary for Sigma to wear shoes. As Sigma had very little exposed skin, Fang agreed with the idea of making him barefoot, feeling it helped bring humanity to the design. However in a post on his Artstation account, Fang attributed the decision instead to wanting to "sell the asylum look", tying into the character's backstory and referencing real-world mental health hospitals, where patients are often not given any shoes to avoid potentially harming themselves.

Like other Overwatch characters, Sigma received skins, unlockable cosmetic items to change his in-game appearance. In particular, his "Prophet" skin features him blindfolded, and was meant to tie into the character's disassociation with time and reality as well as his own abstract "magical" powers. Meanwhile, his "Maestro" skin was designed to promote an upcoming music album Blizzard was producing for the game, and felt the character would suit the event well due to his affinity for classical music. For the skin, Sigma's armor was redesigned to resemble string violins, with his hair slicked back. After the development team felt it was too sleek, they adjusted his hair to be messy, to give him an "Einstein-slash-Beethoven vibe".

== Appearances ==
Siebren de Kuiper is a Dutch astrophysicist introduced in the 2016 first-person shooter Overwatch. Voiced by Boris Hiestand, he was a pioneer in his field. However after an experiment went wrong and he came into contact with a black hole, he sustained psychological damage and gained the ability to manipulate gravity. Deemed too dangerous to roam freely, he was kept in a secret government mental health facility for years, where he became known only as "Subject Sigma". Discovered by the terrorist organization Talon years later, they recruited him for his abilities and knowledge, with Sigma unaware they are manipulating him to their own ends. He is later shown in the webtoon series being used to modify an EMP device capable of devastating all of Europe.

When asked if the character's mental health was the focus of his story, lead writer Michael Chu stated this is that not the case, and that Sigma was instead focused on the accident that left him "eccentric". Chu elaborated by stating that as a result of it he views the world differently, seeing everything through a "prism of music", inspired by their discussions with real-life scientists and physicists. Despite working for Talon, Sigma is kept separated from the decision-making part of the group, with Chu likening his situation to a "frog being boiled". With Overwatch 2, after the character Vendetta takes over Talon, she imprisons Sigma after deciding he is too dangerous.

=== Gameplay ===
In Overwatch, Sigma is classified as a Tank-class character, designed to absorb large amounts of damage from the enemy team while protecting their teammates. His main weapons are "Hyperspheres", gravitic projectiles that can bounce off walls and damage a small area that draws foes into the explosion. The weapon was conceived to help differentiate him from another character in the game, Zarya, who also utilizes a gravity-related attack. Doing so allowed Zarya to retain her theme of physical strength, while Sigma's weapon helped reinforce his role as a scientist. In additional to this weapon, Sigma can generate energy shields with his "Experimental Barrier" ability, and can adjust the position of the shield before use.

Sigma also has several abilities that require activation, though have a "cooldown" period after use, and are unable to be used again during that duration. "Kinetic Grasp" allows him to absorb projectiles in front of him, turning some of the intended damage into temporary health, though it cannot absorb damage from melee-based attacks. "Accretion" meanwhile generates a large projectile of rock, that once launched can knock down opponents, temporarily stunning them. Lastly his 'ultimate' ability, called "Gravitic Flux", requires to charging before use. The ability charges slowly during the course of gameplay, and can be charged faster through damage dealt to the enemy team. Once the ability meter is full, the ability can be activated to lift enemies into the air before slamming them down, dealing significant damage to them.

== Promotion and reception ==
To promote the release of their Overwatch: Cities & Countries, Blizzard ran a "Sigma's Maestro Challenge" event in-game, where participants could unlock the aforementioned skin by playing enough matches as well as other in-game items. In terms of merchandise, Funko Pop released a Sigma figure in 2023.

Following a few teasers on social media in the week prior, Sigma was formally announced as the game's 31st hero on July 22, 2019 with an animated short that introduced his character and backstory. He was made available on Overwatch's public test server the following day, later added to the game fully on August 13, 2019. Early reactions to Sigma as a character were positive despite expressing particular confusion over his bare feet. Daily Dot writer Joseph Knoop joked that the inclusion may have been the developers catering to a particular fetish, and observed memes revolving around the confusion arose from the game's fandom. Cass Marshall in an article for Polygon meanwhile praised the character's introduction through the use of non-linear storytelling to depict his thought process. Considering it cosmic horror, Marshall described the introductory animation as nearly Lovecraftian, or inspired by the Warp from Warhammer 40K's setting.

However after Qui Fang's comments came to light regarding the character's development, fans regarded the character in a more negative light, seeing him as a stereotype of people suffering from mental illness. Liana Ruppert of Prima Games stated that while the barefoot design was a solid marketing decision that brought attention to the character, she added that there were arguably other ways to garner the same attention than to "sell" an asylum look. Meanwhile, Doctors of Psychology Raffael Boccamazzo and Rachel Kowert released a statement for mental health organization Take This raising issue with the stigmas that the character relied upon for his design as well as the use of outdated stereotypes regarding mental health institutions, further expressing their dismay that it was hardly an isolated incident in gaming. Gaming The Mind, a mental health organization in the United Kingdom, instead questioned Chu's statements regarding the character, stating that if mental illness was not a factor, then the development team should have to answer why they relied on asylum tropes.

Kowert and psychologist Kelli Dunlap discussed the character for the book Monstrosity in Games and Play. Examining how mental illness was often portrayed as villainous and monstrous, they felt Sigma's characterization fit the "Zoo Specimen" trope, an erroneous stereotype that often portrays such individuals as wildly unpredictable and dangerous as well as institutions to help them as brutal and inhumane in the treatment of their patients. Kowert and Dunlap also cited Sigma as a negative portrayal of mental illness in a paper for the Canadian Game Studies Association journal Loading, suggesting that despite the developer's intentions, the asylum aspect of his character and allusions to such could easily have been omitted from Sigma without impacting the character, narrative or game setting.

Meanwhile, in their article for Polygon, Marshall described the reveal as a "gut punch" in part due to their own struggles with mental illness. While they pointed out Talon had a similar exploitive relationship with the character Widowmaker, her character was so extreme and removed from reality it was hard to see oneself in her position. By comparison, in Sigma's case much of the imagery used for his character such as the presence of restraints and confusion experienced by him were all too familiar to Marshall. While they acknowledged that it was powerful imagery, they suggested it was some that "perhaps unintentionally trades in dangerous shorthand based on the stigma against mental illness". They added that while the presence of the character did not ruin Overwatch for them, it served as a "an uncomfortable splinter in the premise of the game", and led them to question how the game would tackle such multifaceted characters that face problems real people experience.

Journalist Nathan Grayson, in an article for Kotaku, expressed dismay over the event, stating that Blizzard at the time found themselves in an awkward spot with a character he observed players were otherwise enjoying, and expressing that due to the development team's commitment to inclusivity, he was hopeful they were listening to the negative response. In contrast, Bryan Lawver for Screen Rant argued that the issues with the character represented a farther reaching problem with Overwatch's development. Noting that while the game early on had received significant praise for its character diversity, the portrayal of Sigma's mental issues as well as his role as yet another white character in a game illustrated a growing problem with representation in the game, particularly in light of the absence of more diverse alternatives.
