= Mauga (Overwatch) =

Fictional character in the Overwatch franchise

Maugaloa Malosi
- Overwatch character
- Mauga's appearance in Overwatch
- First game: Overwatch (2023)
- Created by: Alyssa Wong
- Designed by: Alyssa Wong and Arnold Tsang; Qiu Fang (Overwatch 2); Si'I Liafau (tattoos)
- Voiced by: John Tui

In-universe information
- Class: Tank
- Nationality: Samoan

Maugaloa Malosi, more commonly referred to as Mauga, is a character who first appeared in the 2023 video game Overwatch, a Blizzard Entertainment–developed first-person hero shooter. Originally introduced in a 2018 short story for the franchise, he was intended to be included in the first Overwatch, but due to development complications his in-game debut was delayed twice. Mauga is a large Samoan mercenary associated with the terrorist group Talon, along with fellow member Baptiste, armed with twin chain guns he has named "Cha Cha" and "Gunny". He is voiced by John Tui.

Since his short story debut, fans had anticipated the character's game introduction, theorizing how he could play, expressing confusion through memes in response to his absence. His personality has been praised for how it contrasts to other members of Talon, being cheerful where many of them are portrayed as brooding. Mauga has received comparisons to other characters, such as Heavy Weapons Guy from Team Fortress 2 and Maui from the film Moana, the latter due to their close resemblance in heritage and body shape. This later comparison raised questions around whether it could be seen as cultural stereotyping, especially in light of Mauga directly referencing some of Maui's dialogue.

== Conception and development ==
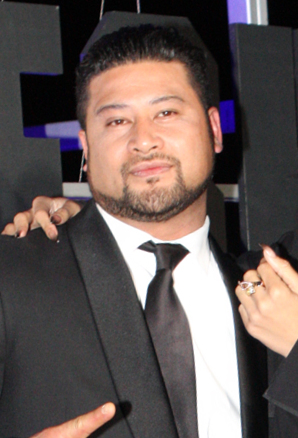
Overwatch's development team felt voice actor John Tui helped emphasize Mauga's "joyous but dark edge".

Mauga was created by writer Alyssa Wong for the original Blizzard Entertainment game Overwatch. He was codenamed "Kielbasa" in early development to deter dataminers. Design notes described Mauga as a large, broad-shouldered man with a similarly large smile and a streak of white running through his hair "like a lightning strike". Mauga first appeared in Wong's 2018 short story tie-in to the game titled "What You Left Behind", written by Wong and illustrated by concept artist Arnold Tsang. Tsang stated the story was conceived to help flesh out the character of Baptiste, who at that point in the game had little ties to other characters.

While Overwatch lead writer stated Mauga's introduction into the comic was meant to coincide with his in-game release, according to game designer Joshua Noh, they found the intended gameplay did not fit the personality or skills they had established for the character. As a result, another character—Sigma—was designed and released to utilize the intended concept. The COVID-19 pandemic further delayed his release, and though he was planned to be included as part of Overwatch 2's launch cast, his introduction was replaced with the more complete character Ramattra to give the developers more time to finish Mauga.

For his in-game appearance in Overwatch, Mauga was designed by concept artist Qiu Fang. According to art director Dion Rogers, they wanted to add characters that people would want to be, and felt that a Samoan would fit the concept of a large character that moved slower but had significant firepower. They researched both Samoans and Polynesians to develop "that right look" for Mauga. Meanwhile, feeling that "the fighting prowess of Overwatch characters" had to feel distinct, they focused on his smart and aggressive personality. In his initial appearance, Mauga was armed two chain guns. They chose to keep this aspect, feeling giant guns best represented "this Giant of a man". The guns themselves, nicknamed "Cha Cha" and "Gunny", ended up the largest weapons in game at that point and went through several iterations to ensure they fit his size and scale.

Mauga is voiced by John Tui, who was chosen from a wide group immediately after auditioning for the role. The development team praised Tui for bringing the character's personality to life, with narrative designer Kyungseo Min stating his "cheerful and boisterous voice embodied the character they were looking for". Other development team members offered similar praise, feeling Tui helped emphasize Mauga's joyous but dark edge.

=== Character design ===
Standing 7 feet tall, Mauga is a very broad, muscular man with a thin black beard covering his lower jaw and long black hair with a shock of white above his upper-left brow. Tattoos cover his arms and torso, except for his stomach. Orange and silver metal plates rest on his pectorals, upper abdomen, and biceps. His outfit consists of a white headband, gold earrings, and fingerless sleeved gloves with plated knuckles. Mauga is shirtless and wears a matching set of brown pants, boots, and a belt. Orange armor plating covers his lower legs and knees, as well as the sides of his hips and waist.

Mauga's tattoos went through several iterations. After a review with a cultural consultant, his early design showed him with Polynesian-inspired tattoos. Additionally, Tattoo artist Si'I Liafau, who specialized in traditional Samoan tattoos, worked directly with the art team. This resulted in a back-and-forth between them, as each submitted their own designs to the other but had to ensure that while authentic, the tattoos could work within the constraints of the character model.

Like other Overwatch characters, Mauga received skins, unlockable cosmetic items to change his in-game appearance. In particular, his "Magma" skin gives him a lava-themed body with black stone armor bits covering it all over, while a red loincloth dangles in the front. By contrast, the "Bonesplitter" skin was designed to fit into the theme of the game's "Beast Hunter" event, removing his tattoos and giving him bone armor around his feet, lower legs, and shoulders, while a five o'clock shadow covers his lower face. Meanwhile, as part of a collaboration between Blizzard and the creators of the anime Cowboy Bebop, Mauga received a skin based on its character Jet Black. Kotaku writer Kenneth Shepard expressed surprise at the decision, feeling that the character Doomfist with his robotic arm would have made a better fit.

== Appearances ==
Mauga, full name Maugaloa Malosi (meaning mountain), is a Samoan mercenary and a close companion of Baptiste. As a video game character, he appears in Overwatch, which established that after he was wounded in a gunfight, his heart was enhanced and his body was augmented with an additional cybernetic heart. As a member of the terrorist group Talon, he became friends with fellow character Baptiste, who had saved his life. After Talon is usurped by the villain Vendetta, Mauga is tasked with heading to Australia to recruit the help of Junkertown's ruler, Junker Queen. Outside Overwatch, Mauga also appears in the updated dating sim game Loverwatch, exclusive to Chinese regions.

Mauga's introduction in the short story "What You Left Behind" established early details regarding the character. He befriended Baptiste in his early days in the Talon organization. At the story's conclusion, Baptiste chooses to save a person that he and Mauga were hired to kill, and the two men part ways over the disagreement. Mauga later appeared in the animated short A Great Day, helping fellow Talon members Sombra and Reaper retrieve an item for their organization.

=== Gameplay ===
In Overwatch, Mauga is classified as a Tank-class character, who are designed to absorb large amounts of damage from the enemy team while protecting their teammates. His primary weapon is the chain gun Gunny, which can set opponents on fire with subsequent hits, while his secondary is Cha-Cha, which deals critical damage to enemies that are on fire. The guns can be fired simultaneously. Meanwhile, his passive ability, "Berserker", temporarily grants him additional health when his attacks cause a critical hit.

In addition, he has two abilities that require activation, though have a "cooldown" period that prevents immediately using them again. "Overrun" causes him to charge forward and ends with an area-of-effect stomp attack. This attack cannot be cancelled once started, and while the player cannot fire weapons in this state, they take reduced damage. Meanwhile, "Cardiac Overdrive" allows him to heal while damaging enemies for a period of time and allows nearby allies the same benefit. Lastly his Ultimate ability, "Cage Match", needs to be charged before use. The ability charges slowly during the course of gameplay and can be charged faster through damage dealt to the enemy team. Once full, the ability can be activated to create a force field where both Mauga and enemies trapped inside cannot leave for a period of time. While inside the force field, Mauga's chain guns have infinite ammunition.

== Promotion and reception ==
Mauga was introduced during the November 2023 BlizzCon and was available for free play that weekend prior to being available as part the December 2023 update. The trial during BlizzCon was intended to allow for adjustments prior to the December release. In 2026, cards and keychains featuring Mauga were included in Chinese Burger King meals as part of a cross-promotion between the company and Loverwatch.

Prior to this release as a playable character, Magua's appearance in the "What You Left Behind" short story led to anticipation for his inclusion in the game. Writing for Inverse, Danny Paez theorized his role in the game and abilities, feeling that his depiction as a hot-headed berserker fit the Tank archetype well. While he reasoned the character could also fit the Damage role, he pointed out the overabundance of characters classified as such and expressed that another would further unbalance Overwatch's gameplay. Years later after Ramattra was added to the game, many fans took to social media to express their dismay that Mauga had not been implemented, despite Blizzard giving no indication that the character would be included at that time.

His portrayal in the short A Great Day was well received, with Cass Marshall of Polygon enjoying the team's dynamics as well as Sombra's frustrations with Mauga for being a loose cannon despite her own secret agenda. Kenneth Shepard of Kotaku enjoyed his characterization in it, describing him as a "giant, often bombastic tank" and stating that despite the trouble he causes, he managed to complete the job. While he praised the team dynamics of Talon and admitted it was a side of Overwatch's story not often seen, Mauga was a standout due to being enigmatic, but having a boisterous nature that contrasted well against organization's broodier members. He added that while Mauga was an "oddball" and "not a fit for everyone", the story illustrated him as capable.

Jeffery Rousseau in an article for gamesindustry.biz cited Mauga as a rarity in mainstream gaming, both as a Samoan and a character from the Oceania region. Rick Lane of PC Gamer meanwhile felt that Mauga heavily resembled the depiction of the Samoan deity Maui in the Disney animated film Moana, and this correlation was furthered by the fact that several of his lines seemed to reference the Disney character's dialogue directly. Fans also noticed the similarity, with Lane observing that while some enjoyed the reference, it was a contentious topic for others who argued back and forth whether it was an example of cultural stereotyping. Esports.gg writer Will Jagielski-Harrison felt that given Disney's role as the world's biggest intellectual property holder, other companies spoofing their material as inevitable, and it was in line with how Blizzard often referenced popular culture. He further felt it echoed the expectations people had regarding Samoan culture in media, citing professional wrestling as an example, though at the same time expressed that the comparisons were a bit too easy to make. Other media outlets compared Mauga to the Heavy Weapons Guy from Valve's Team Fortress 2, with ShackNews writer Ozzie Mejia feeling it was a more direct resemblance than that of Maui. He pointed the similarity in their bulky frames and use of miniguns, but also how their designs encouraged an aggressive playstyle that required external support.

Amy Chen, writing for Esports.gg, examined Mauga and Baptiste's relationship, describing the pair as compelling characters. To her, Mauga was "someone shaped by violence and trauma," which acclimated him to Talon's worldview, while Baptiste "represent[ed] hope and redemption" as well as the belief anyone can make a difference. She saw this as a strength of the series' storytelling in how it gave even its villains nuance, while allowing fans enough room to supply their own interpretations and understandings of the characters.
