= Sombra (Overwatch) =

Fictional character in the 2016 video game Overwatch

- Overwatch character
- Sombra from Overwatch
- First appearance: Overwatch (2016)
- Created by: Arnold Tsang
- Designed by: Ben Zhang
- Voiced by: Carolina Ravassa

In-universe information
- Class: Damage (original); Support (2026 rework)
- Nationality: Mexican

Sombra is the alias of Olivia Colomar, a character who first appeared in the 2016 video game Overwatch, a Blizzard Entertainment–developed first-person hero shooter, and the resulting franchise. In the game's narrative, she is an exceptional black bag operation hacker from Mexico that had joined Talon, a criminal organization aligned against Overwatch. Sombra has stealth-based abilities to move around the battlefield, and as initially released as a Damage hero, was able to hack any opposing character to briefly prevent them from using their special abilities. Her skill kit was reworked in October 2026 to make her a Support hero, with her hacking skills used to heal allies and weaken foes.

Sombra was the second new character to be added to Overwatch after launch, and was introduced formally during the November 2016 BlizzCon event. However, she had been designed and tested internally well before the game's launch, and Blizzard had established an alternate reality game that began within Overwatch's open beta in 2016 that teased her character. Though Blizzard considered the alternate reality game to have drawn interest in Sombra, they found the prolonged campaign taxed players' attention, and subsequently have limited new character promotions to only a few weeks ahead of their formal announcements.

== Conception and development ==
The three iterations of Sombra's early designs: Omniblade, Aztec, and computer hacker

Early in Overwatch's development lead artist Arnold Tsang created a character called "Omniblade", intending her to be one of the characters included in the game's base roster. Omniblade was designed to be a Japanese woman with an affinity for street fashion, that would be equipped with a series of throwing daggers. These daggers would in turn produce different effects, such as revealing enemy locations on the map. As they developed the game they found her skill kit did not fit in with the other heroes they had at that time, and while the character was shelved some of her abilities were reworked into other characters in the roster, namely Hanzo and Genji.

The concept was revisited later on, with Tsang designing her appearance. This version of the character was changed to Mexican in origin, and took inspiration from Aztec culture, giving her a headdress and glowing green spikes across her body. However this iteration was considered too close to the original Omniblade concept, and a third was produced. The character was reimagined as a computer hacker, with energy tendrils added to her fingers to emphasize this, while her outfit was changed to a long hood to better emphasize stealth. Concerns were still raised that the hood made her resemble another character too closely, in this case Ana, and her outfit was shortened, with Ben Zhang designing her finalized look and equipment based on Tsang's design.

According to lead character designer Goeff Goodman, they wanted to bring more villain-like characters to the game. Goodman considers Sombra to be "evil in the sense that she's kind of only out for herself", but will stay loyal to her employer as long as the situation continues to work out for her and further her own agendas. Casting for Sombra was done prior to her launch. Carolina Ravassa was part of one of those casting calls. Though Blizzard was looking for Mexican actors specifically with a Mexico City accent, Ravassa, who is originally from Colombia, had developed a northern Mexican accent, and used it during the casting call, gaining the role. Voice casting director Andrea Toyia then worked with Ravassa to tune the accent to where they wanted it. Sombra's dialog was written by leader writer Michael Chu, with help from members of Blizzard's localization team in Mexico to include local references.

=== Design ===
Standing 5 feet 4 inches tall, Sombra is a latina woman with long brown hair that has purple highlights towards the end. The left side of her head is partially shaved, with blue cables overlaying across her exposed scalp. She has a beauty mark below her left eye, and both of her ears are pierced. Her outfit consists of a black trenchcoat and leggings, with the collar raised. The ends of her sleeves and leggings are a mix of blue and purple, with spikes extending from her fingers on each hand. A small belt of grenades rests on her left hip, while her right hand holds her primary weapon, a machine pistol. For Overwatch 2, Sombra's design was changed slightly, adding more defined shoes and kneepads to her legs, a glowing double circle to the shaved side of her head, and various ribbon cables throughout her outfit and across her hair. Most of her attire was left unchanged, except for her now exposed shoulders.

Like other Overwatch characters, Sombra received skins, unlockable cosmetic items to change her in-game appearance. When designing them, they wanted the skins to express her "smart, agile and dangerous" personality. In particular, her "Los Muertos" skin was intended to represent her time working as a hacker for a Mexican gang of the same name. This design not only featured a large pink mowhawk, but neon green across her clothes, and a neon green skeleton tattooed across her body and face. This latter aspect caused some problems for the development team, as they had to create new display effects just to illustrate the glowing ink on her skin.

== Appearances ==
Sombra's biography is provided through additional Overwatch media including the Overwatch digital comics. Her real name is Olivia Colomar, revealed in the Searching virtual comic, released in September 2017. She was born within the fictional city of Dorado, Mexico, the same year that the Overwatch organization was established, and is a native speaker of Spanish. While young, she lost everything from the Omnic Crisis, and became an orphan. She recognized her talents in hacking and the value of information, and later joined the fictional Los Muertos gang in Dorado. Eventually, she was recruited by Talon, an antagonist organization that includes Reaper and Widowmaker. As a hacker, she employed the name Sombra, Spanish for "shadow", and eschewed her birth name. After Vendetta takes over Talon in Overwatch 2, she and several other members leave the organization and are now on the run.

=== Gameplay ===
When she was first introduced, Sombra was classified under the "Damage" role in Overwatch. She is equipped with a low-damage, high-capacity machine pistol for short-range combat. Her abilities allow her to hack enemies and their deployables, which prevents them from using their abilities for 1 second after the hack is executed, though they may still use primary skills. Sombra's hacks also relay information about the opponent's health and ultimate ability status to her teammates, as long as they are within line-of-sight of the opponent, for about a minute from the hack. Her hacks can also be applied to health packs, allowing them to recharge at three times their normal speed, while also disabling their use for enemies. While her hacks on enemies are short, lasting ten seconds, her hacks on health packs last for 45 seconds, unless hacked again before this period ends. Sombra may also throw a "translocator" to teleport, making her invisible for 5 seconds and gaining a burst of speed to hide behind enemy lines to perform her hacks. Her ultimate ability is an EMP blast that destroys all enemy barriers and shields, along with hacking enemies and dealing 25% of their current health in the process.

With developers admitting she was a "tricky" character to balance, she started off as a hero character with a hacking ability as to keep opponents debuffed, according to lead character designer Geoff Goodman. When being initially developed, the developers had her designed as a support character. Goodman noted that they found in gameplay testing that hacking-only skills were not "super great" and started to consider building the character around stealth, incorporating the hacking aspect as part of the character's abilities. They had previously tried a stealth character with Genji, having had given him an ability to invisibly move behind enemies, stun them, and then kill their foes with another skill, but found this only useful to deal with opponents that were separated from their team members, making the stealth aspect not fun to play. Using this past criticism, they gave similar stealth abilities to Sombra, but in combination with the hacking skills as to be a more effective contribution to the team regardless of their opponents' style. Sombra's initial base form saw her invisibility as a constant, passive ability in which she could break her stealth at a certain radius as she approached closer to other players.

Goodman noted that they were initially hesitant about incorporating skill debuffs into the game, knowing that players would likely react negatively to having skills stripped even for a short period of time. However, they were emboldened by the successful playtesting of Ana and her sleep-inducing ability which they were able to tweak quickly in response to feedback, and believed they would be able to manage Sombra's hacking skills in the same manner.

Shortly following her release, Kaplan noted changes would be made to her gameplay as she was deemed too "situational". Once in the game's playable roster, Kaplan found that Sombra became prone to over-buffing due to her unique abilities. Even after efforts were made to tweak Sombra's gameplay design, Kaplan admitted that the character was "not 100% where [she needed] to be".

As with other characters, Sombra underwent considerable redesigning for her appearance in Overwatch 2. In 2021, Blizzard received fan backlash for announcements related to changes made to Sombra for the sequel, which were largely buffs to her character including being able to "reveal hacked targets through walls and [having] her hacks no longer remove [her] stealth." Video game media also noted how her playstyle makes her a challenge to balance in-game. Soon after the sequel's October 2022 release into early access, players noted a bug involving Sombra being able to contest the objective on payload maps in a manner which kept her safe from enemy detection.

Following the relaunch of Overwatch 2 as simply Overwatch, Blizzard opted to rework Sombra from a damage to a support role, releasing this update in October 2026 with the refreshed Season 5. The primary change was to remove her Hack ability, replacing this with a Hotfix skill that heals allies over time though still able to hack enemy turrets, and replacing the Virus ability with a Cyberspace area attack that weakens enemies and heals allies within it. Game director Aaron Keller said that Blizzard recognized that Sombra was considered "anti-fun" to play both as an opponent as she could appear from nowhere and pour lots of damage into an unsuspecting player, and as an ally as she would normally play away from the current objective and not directly support the team. Keller said shifting her to be support would encourage players to still engage with her interference gameplay, but still would need to return to help contest the objective and help her team, keeping her identity from her damage role.

== Promotion and merchandise ==
Blizzard had planned a long-term alternate reality game (ARG) for Sombra as early as the open beta period for Overwatch. According to Goodman, the goal was to have players "get an idea of who she is and a little bit of her personality before we even unveiled her", and playing off her nature as a hacking character. In October, leaked images containing references to Sombra were posted onto Reddit. One such image claimed to show a character model of Sombra and a partial biography of the character. On November 1, a Blizzard store listing was accidentally released and immediately removed. The image featured a character resembling the leaked character model, named Sombra in its filename, and bore the signature of a Blizzard concept artist. The ARG concluded during BlizzCon on November 4, 2016, with the official reveal of Sombra, where it was announced that she would be introduced to the game's public testing region on PC in the following week. Sombra was released for all users on November 15, 2016.

== Critical reception ==
Sombra was well received upon release. Ana Valens in an article for The Mary Sue named Sombra one of the best female characters introduced in Overwatch, praising her "hack-the-planet" mantra, stating that for women in tech-based fields "that grew up looking for cool anti-establishments hackers in media, Sombra feels like home." Fellow writer for the site Jessica Lachenal emphasized Sombra's confidence in turn, considering her a good foil for the more cold characters like Widowmaker and adding "Impish doesn't even begin to cover her personality; she has fun with what she does [...] she's a great breath of fresh air in a continually developing diverse world." IGN's Erick Romero named her one of the most iconic Hispanic characters in gaming, stating that due to her design, backstory and unique playstyle she was "excellent Hispanic representation in a game full of diverse and larger-than-life characters." In a presentation at the 2017 Brazilian Symposium on Computer Games and Digital Entertainment, Professor Georgia da Cruz Pereira voiced appreciation for how she differed from Latin American female characters in other games, as instead of relying on her figure or beauty she relied on her cybernetic enhancements and how her appearance revolved around them.

Paste named her one of the best new characters introduced in 2016, with Holly Green stating that it was in part due to "defying convention" with her hacker background, but also "precisely because she is everything that videogame characters aren't allowed to be: Mexican, female, and over the age of 25." Nico Deyo in an article for the same publication offered further praise, stating that while the developers felt the ARG was a failure, "the character feels like a victory", and was a significant improvement from some of the mishandling with the cultural representations of characters that had occurred previously. She further noted that Sombra was one of the few female Mexican characters in gaming, and was grateful the developers veered away from the usual archetypes of that culture. Praise was also given to her hacker portrayal, with Deyo noting such characters are often such characters depicted as white and male in media, adding "the fact that a female character of color is allowed to be represented as a genius techno-spy from early childhood is a deft move." Meanwhile, Allegra Frank of Polygon noted players themselves took particular affinity to her mannerisms, in particular her "boop" voice line in the Infiltration short.

On the other hand while Natalie Flores stated how overjoyed she was at Sombra's reveal, hoping it would lead to a wider variety of Latinas in gaming, she noticed instead it led to a trend of such characters using her as a blueprint. Namely she pointed out several, including Sombra, often portrayed as involved in criminal activities or gang culture, and felt there was an increased effort of "exotification" in regards to them. Additionally she noted that while such characters were often from very different cultures, their dialect was typically have the "same Ambiguously Hispanic accent", and rely are identified as Latina more on the character's skin color and accent "whose authenticity and marketability is vouched by white people". Flores added that through characters like Sombra she could "appreciate being able to see myself as poised, self-assured, and assertive", but hoped to see more nuance instead brought to such characters and that such women "shouldn't be portrayed as just this in fictional worlds."

Guilherme Pedrosa Carvalho de Araújo and Gleislla Soares Monteiro in the Brazilian journal Revista Sistemas e Mídias Digitais also noted her criminal background as a common stereotype of Latino characters in video games. However, they also emphasized that in contrast to such characters, Sombra was not overtly sexualized in terms of design, with less emphasis on her breasts and hips as compared to characters in franchises such as Street Fighter and Tekken. Additionally they saw her personality also as a departure from the norm for Latina characters in gaming, who are often portrayed as seductive and trying to "provoke, lovingly or sexually, the other characters."
