= Widowmaker (Overwatch) =

Fictional character in the 2016 video game Overwatch

- Overwatch character
- Widowmaker's appearance in Overwatch
- First game: Overwatch (2016)
- Created by: Jeff Kaplan
- Designed by: Arnold Tsang; Roman Kenney (equipment); Ben Zhang (weapon)
- Voiced by: Chloé Hollings

In-universe information
- Class: Damage
- Nationality: French

Widowmaker is the alias of Amélie Lacroix, a character who first appeared in the 2016 video game Overwatch, a Blizzard Entertainment–developed first-person hero shooter, later featured in its resulting franchise and subsequent 2022 sequel, Overwatch 2. Conceived by Jeff Kaplan in the early development phases of the game, her design was fleshed out by Arnold Tsang and other Blizzard artists. Voiced by Chloé Hollings, Widowmaker is a French ballerina-turned-sleeper agent for the terrorist organization Talon, becoming a high-profile sniper assassin after killing her husband. Since the game's release she has appeared in various spinoff media related to the franchise, including comics and merchandise.

Widowmaker as a character was positively received, and was one of the most popular characters during the game's open-beta period. Reception on the sexuality of her design has been varied, with some arguing it gave her depth and did not detract from her character, while others argued it was a negative aspect of the games as a whole and a point of mockery towards both the character and Overwatch. Widowmaker's image has also been frequently used in unlicensed Overwatch-related pornography, produced by both fans of the game, as well as pornographic production companies. This has led to contrasting examinations of the works and how the character's depiction varies between fan works and professionally-made content.

== Conception and development ==
Designed by artist Roman Kenney, her visor utilizes three plates that slide over her head when active, meant to resemble a spider's eyes

While working on a massive multiplayer online game concept for Blizzard Entertainment, developer Geoff Goodman suggested the idea of a large number of character classes for players to select, but with class specialization for each. Fellow developer Jeff Kaplan took this idea to heart, salvaging character concepts from Titan—a then-recently cancelled Blizzard project—and character artwork by artist Arnold Tsang for that project. Kaplan created an eight-page pitch for a first person shooter concept to propose the idea which included a series of proposed characters, among them a sniper called "Longshot" clad in a long black cloak and armor. Longshot's concept borrowed a sniper rifle and grappling hook elements from Titan's planned "Ranger" class, and added a machine pistol and a "recon visor". Though they knew they wanted to add a sniper to the game, they were originally uncertain on further details; the character's morality and whether they would be a human or a robot were discussed aspects of the character. Taking inspiration from another Blizzard Entertainment character, Sylvanas Windrunner from World of Warcraft, they chose to make a character that represented the "darker aspect" of the game's storyline. As the concept developed, Longshot's appearance changed to a woman with pale skin with her stomach and the undersides of her breasts exposed, clothed in cargo pants covering her legs. She was one of the final twenty designs to be featured on the main pitch image for Prometheus, which once approved, later materialized into Overwatch.

Once work began on Overwatch, she was one of the first four characters implemented into the game, utilizing the character Tracer's model textured solid black as a placeholder. Several concepts were considered, with a primary focus on her visor to have multiple red "bug" eyes and changing her outfit to a revealing bodysuit with spiked heels. The developers noticed the lenses resembled a spider's eyes, and they chose to emphasize an arachnid theme on her design, changing her into the character Widowmaker. Several approaches to her design were considered during this time, including various degrees of chitin-like armor as well as the possibility of a segmented stinger-like grappling hook that coiled around her arm. Her visor also went through several iterations, many of which covered her entire upper head, before switching to an idea of having her face exposed while the helmet was integrated into her head with cables out of the back making up her hair. They finally settled on a design drawn by Roman Kenney where she retained her hair, and the visor was made up of pieces that automatically extend over her eyes when used.

=== Design ===
Standing 5 feet 9 inches (175 cm) tall, Widowmaker is a slender woman with light blue skin, yellow eyes, and dark blue long hair tied into a ponytail behind her head. Her outfit consists of a form-fitting light purple bodysuit with short sleeves and the front unzipped with plunging cleavage, while the back is similarly exposed. Her hips, legs and feet are covered with segmented black armor with spikes protruding from the knees and sides of the shoes, with a small shoulderpad covers her left shoulder and a pouch strapped to her right thigh. The front of her head is covered by the aforementioned visor, covering her brow when not active. In addition to her black gloves, her left arm has a gauntlet capable of firing a retractable grappling hook. Her right forearm is covered in a tattoo resembling a spider's web with the French text "araignée du soir, cauchemar" ("evening spider, nightmare"), which according to the book The Art of Overwatch is a play on a French saying, and along with the large black widow spider tattoo on her back is meant to illustrate the character's menacing nature. Her weapon, conceptualized by artist Ben Zhang, is an assault/sniper rifle hybrid that has its barrel and scope extend when aiming. In addition to the above details, a stylized "W" adorns her shoulderpad, gun and torso at the base of the plunging cleavage, while a glowing red hourglass can be seen on the gun itself. For her appearance in Overwatch 2, the developers went for a more "cyberpunk" feel for the character, with the character seen sporting a braid and new armor plating.

Like other Overwatch characters, Widowmaker received skins, unlockable cosmetic items to change her in-game appearance. When developing them, they found some difficulty redesigning the visor to match the outfit, as it was tied to an animation for her character. Notable examples of these included the ballerina-themed "Odile" with a teal and black color scheme, the "Competesse" skin modeled after French nobility, and the "Noire" skin, which was meant to illustrate an earlier version of the character and utilized concepts from her previous planned designs, such as replacing her hair with thick coiled cables. In 2023, a purchasable Greek mythology-themed skin modeled after Medusa caused some controversy, as the snakes on the skin had audible hissing both the player and opponents could hear. This led to the skin being dubbed by players and media outlets as "pay-to-lose", as a result of incidents of players complaining about being unable to hear enemies, while also being more easily located themselves.

== Appearances ==
Amélie Lacroix is a French woman introduced in the 2016 first-person shooter Overwatch. A ballerina, her husband Gerard was an agent in Overwatch, a global peace-keeping force. The terrorist group Talon kidnapped her, and unbeknownst to the Overwatch team that rescued her, they had brainwashed her to act as a sleeper agent. After killing Gerard, she fled to Talon, who trained her as a sniper. Now operating under the moniker "Widowmaker", they experimented on her to improve her combat capabilities, slowing her heartrate which caused her skin to turn light blue and her emotions to be numbed. She later returns in the game's sequel, Overwatch 2. Her character is voiced by Chloé Hollings, with some of the dialogue spoken in French.

Her story is further fleshed out in supplemental video and literary media related to the series. First appearing a cinematic trailer for Overwatch at the 2014 BlizzCon event, she is featured trying to steal a gauntlet belonging to Talon's imprisoned leader, Doomfist. She later appears in the animated short Alive, the second in a series of Overwatch animated shorts. In it, she comes into conflict with Tracer while on an assassination mission in London, escaping after killing her target. In a subsequent short, Infiltration, she appears alongside Talon agents trying to assassinate a Russian CEO, but the attempt fails. Her story continues in Overwatch 2, where she's shown facilitating a meeting between the characters Zenyatta and Ramattra on behalf of Talon. Later, after the character Vendetta takes over Talon, she and several others leave the organization and are now on the run.

In print media, she appears in Legacy, the seventh issue of the 2016 Overwatch tie-in comic book series. Set prior to the events of the game and shortly after Gerard's murder, in the comic Overwatch attempts to rescue hostages from a Talon installation, but come under fire from Widowmaker. Their own sniper Ana tracks and shoots her in the helmet, but is stunned upon recognizing her, as Overwatch had assumed she was dead. Ana's sniper rifle is shot by Widowmaker and the shrapnel hits her face, incapacitating her. She appears briefly in the tenth issue Reflections, placing a flower on Gerard's grave, and later in issue 13, titled Masquerade, in which she helps the newly freed Doomfist reassert his power over Talon. She also appears in the second issue of Overwatch's Tracer—London Calling comic miniseries, a retelling of the Alive animated short from Tracer's point of view. She also appears as a minor character in the short story Code of Violence, set before the events of the game, in which she assists Talon with retrieving a scientist.

=== Gameplay ===
In Overwatch, Widowmaker is classified as a Damage-class character, designed to provide a more offensive role in team compositions. She was originally classified as a Defense-class character before it and the Offense-class were combined into one classification. A sniper able to be utilized well from a distance, her primary weapon is a rifle named "Widow's Kiss" with two firing modes, both of which utilize hitscan projectiles. When firing without aiming the weapon functions as a close-to-medium assault rifle, while aiming will cause the weapon to do increased damage as a "critical hit".

Widowmaker also has several abilities that require activation, though the first two have a "cooldown" period after use and are unable to be used again during that duration. "Grappling Hook" allows her to readjust her position and reach high areas, immediately pulling her towards the targeted location. Her second ability, "Venom Mine", fires a projectile that sticks to walls or the ground, and acts as a proximity mine that releases poison gas that damages enemies in the blast radius over time once triggered, and will highlight them through walls for the player to see. Lastly, her 'ultimate' ability, called "Infra-Sight", requires to be charged before use. The ability charges slowly during the course of gameplay, and can be charged faster through damage dealt to the enemy team. Once full the ability can be activated to highlight all enemies through walls for both her and her teammates, helping to counter enemy flankers.

== Promotion and reception ==
Third party works such as figures, artwork, and film leaned heavily into her sexuality, with varying portrayals.

To promote Overwatch and the character, she was one of twelve heroes showcased in a playable build of the game at the 2014 BlizzCon convention, and a special "Noire" skin for the character was included on pre-ordered versions of the game. In Blizzard Entertainment's Heroes of the Storm, a Widowmaker skin for the playable character Nova and vice-versa were made available as cross-promotion between it and Overwatch. Various material was also released to promote the character such as a cosplay guide, promotional images themed around holidays, and a Figma-line figurine released by Good Smile Company in February 2018. Blizzard also released a 13.5 in (34 cm) statue of the character, while HummingBird Studio released an unofficial 20 in (51 cm) resin statue in 2022.

Since her release, the character was very positively received, being the most selected defensive-class character during Overwatch's beta period, as well as one of the most frequently cosplayed characters from the game. Described by journalist Cameron Koch as "by far, is the most traditionally sexy character in Overwatch", Widowmaker's character and portrayal has been the subject of much discussion and critique. Gita Jackson of Kotaku noted that Blizzard Entertainment leaned hard into the femme fatale "fetish-y roots" aspect of her character, and while she approved, she noted that fan reception was not always quite as positive to this particular aspect. Joseph Knoop of The Daily Dot on the other hand felt her "icy sexuality" helped her popularity in the fandom with people keen to cosplay as her, and further added his belief that "it's never felt like it's come at the expense of her agency or dignity." In a presentation at the 2017 Brazilian Symposium on Computer Games and Digital Entertainment, Professor Georgia da Cruz Pereira noted that the femme fatale aspect of Widowmaker's character helped offset uncomfortable reactions to her design due to it fitting within public expectations for such a character. She further noted displays of sensuality by Widowmaker also didn't feel as out of place to the public as they did with Tracer, in part due to her attire and presentation.

In contrast, however, Alyssa Mercante of Kotaku more forwardly described her as "aggressively sexualized", further complaining that her "impossibly long legs and massive tits" seemed to be targeting the male gaze whenever she appeared on the screen. Ayla Arthur of The Daily Dot did not share fellow contributor Knoop's opinion, and instead gave a thorough analysis of her design. In it she stated that while she could rationalize the character's sleek outfit due to her role as a sniper and her heels to absorb the shock of jumping down, her chest felt like it was solely "a sex object" and questioning any valid reasoning for such a presentation. She further added that the overemphasis on breasts and a lack of protection towards them was a constant she saw in female character design, and one she found particularly frustrating. Similar qualms were raised by Comic Book Resources and Rock Paper Shotgun, both of which questioning why her armor seemed intended to distract opponents up close if her goal as a sniper was to keep far away instead, with Philippa Warr of the latter stating "Who could she possibly be alluring? Are her opponents all Binoculars People from a Binoculars Planet?" When the game was featured on the talk show Conan, host Conan O'Brien and his guests riffed on Widowmaker's sexual aspects, culminating in them setting up a match with nothing but Widowmakers to "stare at the shiny butts" while mocking the "moaning" noises the character made when taking damage.

Nico Deyo, writing for Vice cited her as an example of what they felt was an overused trope by Blizzard when it came to their female villain or anti-hero characters, routinely portraying their "torture, trauma, control and revenge [...] indelibly written upon their bodies in an unmistakable way". She further described the more aggressive elements of her design "old-fashioned purity culture with spikes and blades," and added that her personality felt more like a punishment, preventing Widowmaker from reaching an emotional conclusion. Polygon's Cass Marshall offered a different take on the character, noting that while the character's design was heavily critiqued from the very start, they felt she dressed "with style". They added that while much of her design could be written off as a common video game trope of female characters, as the title progressed more cosmetics were released they kept a similar theme of focusing on her style and showing more skin than other characters, and felt that the core concept being Blizzard's design process was to express her character as someone who is "extremely vain, fastidious, and chooses style over pure substance". Marshall further added that the presence of her tattoos, as well as her interactions with other characters in game, painted a picture contrary to the emotionless assassin profile she was given, and hoped it meant future story hooks for Blizzard to work with in the future in regards to the character.

Nathan Grayson, in an article for Kotaku, noted that Overwatch had a significant amount of fan-made pornography, much of it revolving around Widowmaker. He further noted that she was one of the most-searched subjects on sites like Pornhub once Overwatch entered its open beta period, a trend that has continued well past the game's actual release through 2022. Destructoid's Steven Hansen also mentioned the phenomenon, commenting that he'd already stumbled on Widowmaker having sex with "like three different Overwatch characters — all women — on the first page of a simple Google image search" when trying to write the article. Companies such as Brazzers and VR Cosplay X have utilized her image in their own live-action hardcore porn parodies of the game. The book Modes of Esports Engagement in Overwatch discussed these two portrayals in detail, attributing her usage to force the normally dominant character into a submissive role for the benefit of male viewers. While Grayson had discussed how fan works emphasized her traits in an intimate manner, the book stated the Brazzers produced work utilized those same traits to show her as manipulative, adding "Widowmaker and by extension women players of Overwatch are portrayed as relying on using their bodies and sexuality to distract men in order to succeed in competition against men."
