= Baptiste (Overwatch) =

Fictional character in the Overwatch franchise

Jean-Baptiste Augustin
- Overwatch character
- Baptiste's appearance in Overwatch
- First game: Overwatch (2019)
- Created by: Michael Chu and Geoff Goodman
- Designed by: Ben Zhang; Ryan Denniston
- Voiced by: Benz Antoine

In-universe information
- Class: Support
- Origin: Tortuga, Haiti
- Nationality: Haitian

Jean-Baptiste Augustin, commonly referred to as Baptiste, is a character who first appeared in the 2016 video game Overwatch, a Blizzard Entertainment–developed first-person hero shooter. A Haitian man, Baptiste was a combat medic working with the terrorist group Talon from a young age. Now on the run after leaving the organization, he eventually joins with the newly reformed peace-keeping taskforce Overwatch. Baptiste is voiced by Benz Antoine.

== Conception and development ==
Baptiste was created for the Blizzard Entertainment game Overwatch by lead writer Michael Chu and lead character designer Geoff Goodman. Chu conceived him as a former member of the terrorist organization Talon in order to enable future storytelling opportunities with those characters at a later time. Meanwhile, he was given a Haitian origin due to Chu wanting Overwatch to reflect lesser represented nations in gaming amongst its cast, and the country's strong history of fighting for independence. Meanwhile, the development team wanted to push a different kind of "healing" character in the game, building around the idea of a "utility" support character armed with various gadgets.

Early on in development, the character was planned to be armed with a grenade launcher and a secondary weapon of some kind such as a pistol. This was later changed to a singular burst fire rifle after they started developing his story. Despite his association with Talon, under the organization he was characterized as trying to help others in need. Goodman stated as a result they were able to build his gameplay around this duality, giving both his healing abilities and firearm separate ammunition, but both replenishing upon reload. While he was initially worried this mechanic may feel weird for players, he was pleased to discover the concept worked in execution. According to concept artist Ben Zhang, the large amount of planned gadgets required several passes. While they initially aimed for a futuristic look, they felt this hampered player relatability and simplified his weapons and gear to try and distill the character concept.

=== Design ===
His unique color scheme, scarf, and heavy boots were intended to help differentiate him from others in the cast, while also strengthening his visual appeal.

Baptiste went through several designs during his development. Zhang stated they initially conceived him as someone handsome, but wanted him also to appear young and agile early on to fit his combat medic characterization and able to traverse a battlefield quickly. As his story was developed, he was made older and given a bodybuilder physique. This changed how the animation team approached the character, with lead animator Ryan Denniston stating it took several iterations to get right. They finally chose to have him stomp hard as he runs to convey that sense of weight, as well as a harder landing impact from jumps.

Like other Overwatch characters, Baptiste received skins, unlockable cosmetic items to change his in-game appearance. Of particular note, his "Spec Ops" skin was inspired by his time as part of an elite military team, made to play into the fantasy of a hero as a support specialist and tactician. More heavily armored with a three-camera set of goggles over his right eye, an octopus logo was created to more specifically tie the group to the Caribbean. Playing into a similar cultural theme, the "Buccaneer" skin was a pirate themed outfit that was meant to portray him as one of the high-ranking officers on the ship due to his heroic status, implementing gold trimming and a visually cool jacket, while the antenna on his back was replaced with a cutlass.

== Appearances ==
Baptiste, full name Jean-Baptiste Augustin, is a Haitian combat medic and former operative of Talon. He had been recruited into Talon as an orphan from the Omnic Crisis, but became disenfranchised with Talon's violent goals, quitting the organization and became hunted. Tipped off by his friend Mauga about a planned strike against Overwatch, Baptiste was eventually found by Cole and brought into Overwatch's ranks.

In June 2019, Blizzard released "What You Left Behind" a short story about Baptiste's background written by Alyssa Wong and illustrated by Arnold Tsang. Alongside the story, Blizzard ran a mini 2-week "Reunion" event that allowed players to earn skins and other cosmetics related to the story by winning matches across any mode and watching specific Twitch streams. During Pride Month of June 2023, Blizzard affirmed that they had written Baptiste as bisexual, with content updates during that month to explicitly reflect this.

Baptiste is voiced by Benz Antoine. Antoine had gotten the role in part for his ability to speak Creole with a French accent.

=== Gameplay ===
Baptiste welds a burst fire submachine gun that also can fire healing grenades at allies. He has boost that he can charge to give him a high jumping ability. He also can throw out a brief burst of healing to himself and nearby allies, and throw up a device that creates an immortality field for a brief period or until the device is destroyed. His ultimate creates a rectangular gateway that increases the damage of ally projectiles that pass through it while also reducing the damage from enemy projectiles.

== Promotion and reception ==
After approximately a week of teases through their social media sites, Blizzard formally introduced Baptiste as the game's 30th hero with an origin story video on February 25, 2019, and was added to the PTR the following day. Baptiste was made live for all servers on March 19, 2019.

Baptiste has been well received since his introduction. Brando Simeo Starkey in an article for Andscape praised how well Overwatch represented black male characters, and felt of them Baptiste as "perhaps the most alluring" and "perhaps most culturally significant" due to his Haitian heritage and use of his native language particularly in light of how the culture was often overlooked in game. In addition, he felt that Baptiste helped serve as a positive role model for children to be able to see themselves in, especially in light of how often he felt the world was hostile to black identities.

Guilherme Pedrosa Carvalho de Araújo and Gleislla Soares Monteiro in the Brazilian journal Revista Sistemas e Mídias Digitais praised the character's departure from typical portrayals of black men in video games, instead portrayed as someone trying to avoid encouraging the harm that led to him and others being orphaned. They further enjoyed how he was shown as "a brave warrior with a good heart", avoiding many stereotypes common to both black and hispanic characters in video games, and instead shown as someone who refused to stand with an organization that acted against his beliefs and motivations.

Discussion also revolved around Baptiste bisexuality after the release of the As Your Are short story. The staff of Gayming Magazine initially expressed confusion as to why Pharah openly stated that she a lesbian, yet Baptiste was revealed to be bisexual in developer accounts afterward. The development team responded that they felt Baptiste as a character was not one to state such casually, and that there were opportunities later for the character to express their identity. While the staff felt that was a satisfactory answer from a story perspective, they expressed some concern as to the timing of the reveal. Noting a tendency on Blizzard's part to reveal a character as LGBTQ+ to detract from controversy, they observed Baptiste's announcement closely followed the development team stating that Player vs Enemy content for Overwatch 2 was cancelled.

Kenneth Shepard of Kotaku meanwhile felt the reveal was obvious for anyone that had been paying attention to Baptiste's storyline, and in particular his dialogue with fellow character Lifeweaver. While he pointed out the short story was rather brief and direct, he argued that it was perfectly fine and helped convey two characters coming to terms with themselves. Isaiah Colbert on the other hand observed that some fans on social media reacted with anger and outrage at the reveal. Describing it as "homophobic drivel we get whenever any fictional character comes out", he and some fans echoed Shepard's earlier comment that the character's sexuality seemed obvious. Other comments mentioned Gayming Magazine's concern over the timing of the event, though counterarguments presented that while possible, anger over the cancellation was likely to extend well into the future.

Amy Chen for esports.gg examined Mauga and Baptiste's relationship, describing them as compelling characters in how through them the Overwatch writing team showed how Talon preys on the disenfranchised. To her, Mauga was someone shaped by violence and trauma, and more acclimated to Talon's worldview, while by Baptiste represented hope and redemption as well as the belief anyone can make a difference. She saw this as a strength of the series' storytelling in how it gave even its villains nuance, while allowing fans enough room to supply their own interpretations and understandings of the characters.
