= Chloé Hollings =

French and Australian voice actress (born 1988)

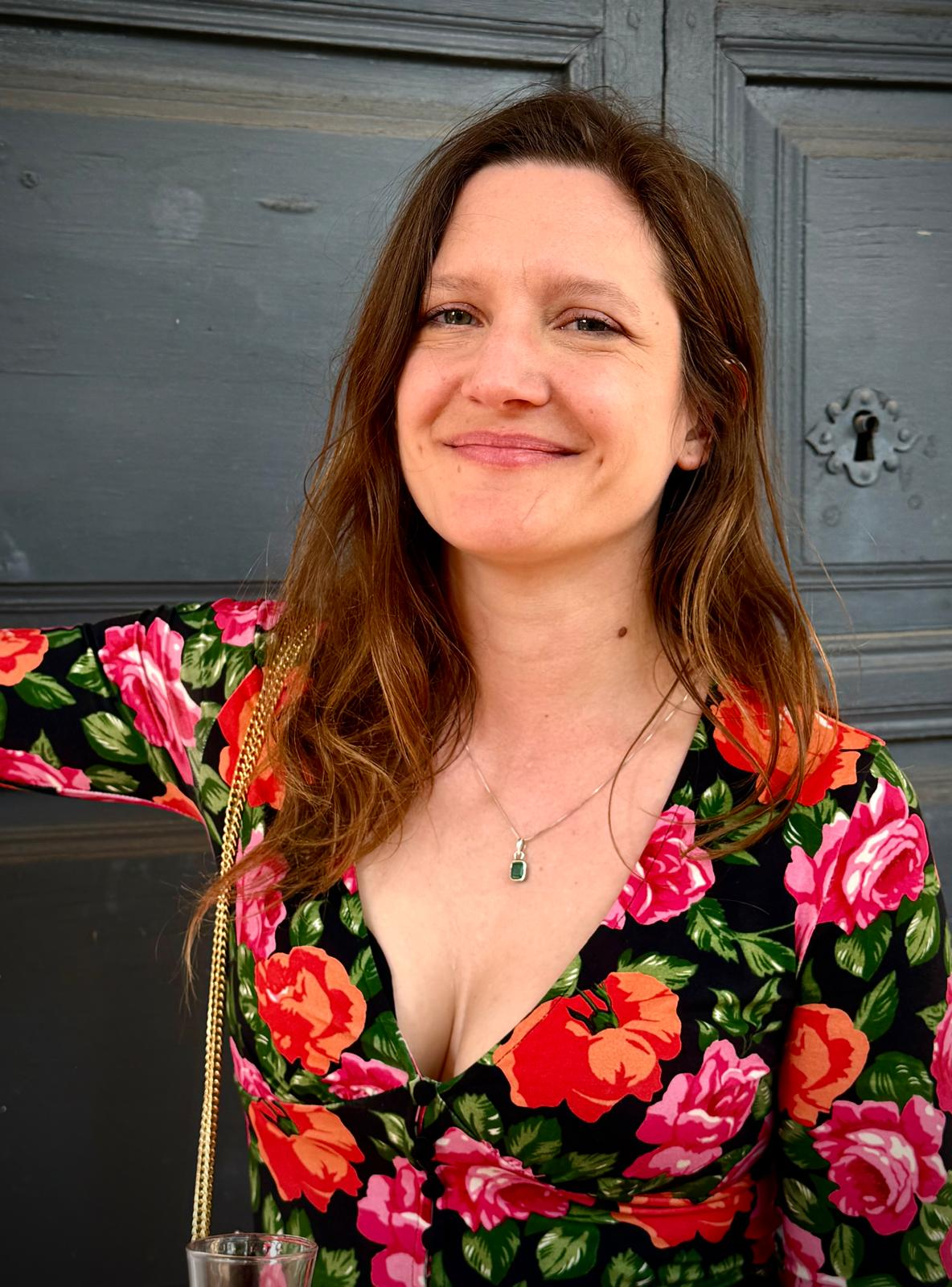
- Hollings in 2026
- Born: April 15, 1988 (age 38); Paris, France
- Citizenship: France; Australia
- Occupation: Voice actress
- Years active: 2012–present

Chloé Hollings (born 15 April 1988) is a French and Australian voice actress. She is internationally best known for voicing the character Widowmaker in the video game Overwatch (2016) in both English and French.

== Early life ==
Hollings was born in Paris to a French father and an English-Australian mother. When she was a child, her family moved to Melbourne.

She has a scar on her chin as a result of a childhood fall.

== Career ==
She has trained under Jean-Laurent Cochet, Luis Jaime-Cortez, Jordan Beswick, and Scott Williams. She has performed in the theater, and voiced documentaries, advertisements and short plays. As a singer, she is a lyric soprano.

She voices the character Widowmaker in both the English and French version of Overwatch (2016), a hit video game developed by Blizzard Entertainment. Additionally, she voices the character in the Overwatch Animated Shorts.

She has written a book called Fuck les régimes! ("Fuck diets!"), published in French in 2016.

== Personal life ==
Originally a resident of Paris, Hollings relocated to Los Angeles in 2019 for new life experiences and to be closer to her best friends among the Overwatch cast.

== Filmography ==
=== Film ===
Year	Title	Role	Notes
2010	Sea Rex 3D: Journey to a Prehistoric World	Julie	Documentary
2017	Valerian and the City of a Thousand Planets	Alex-Intruder's voice	

=== Television ===
Year	Title	Role	Notes
2013	Petits secrets entre voisins	Angélique Hubert	Episode: "Colocataires"
2013	Jo		
2015	Versailles	Housemaid	Episode: "I am the State"
2016	C à vous	Herself	

=== Video games ===
Year	Title	Voice role	Notes
2016	Overwatch	Widowmaker	Also in French dub
2019	Wolfenstein: Youngblood	Roxanne Moreau	
2022	Overwatch 2	Widowmaker	

== Bibliography ==
- Fuck les régimes! (2016)
