= Carolina Ravassa =

Colombian actress (born 1985)

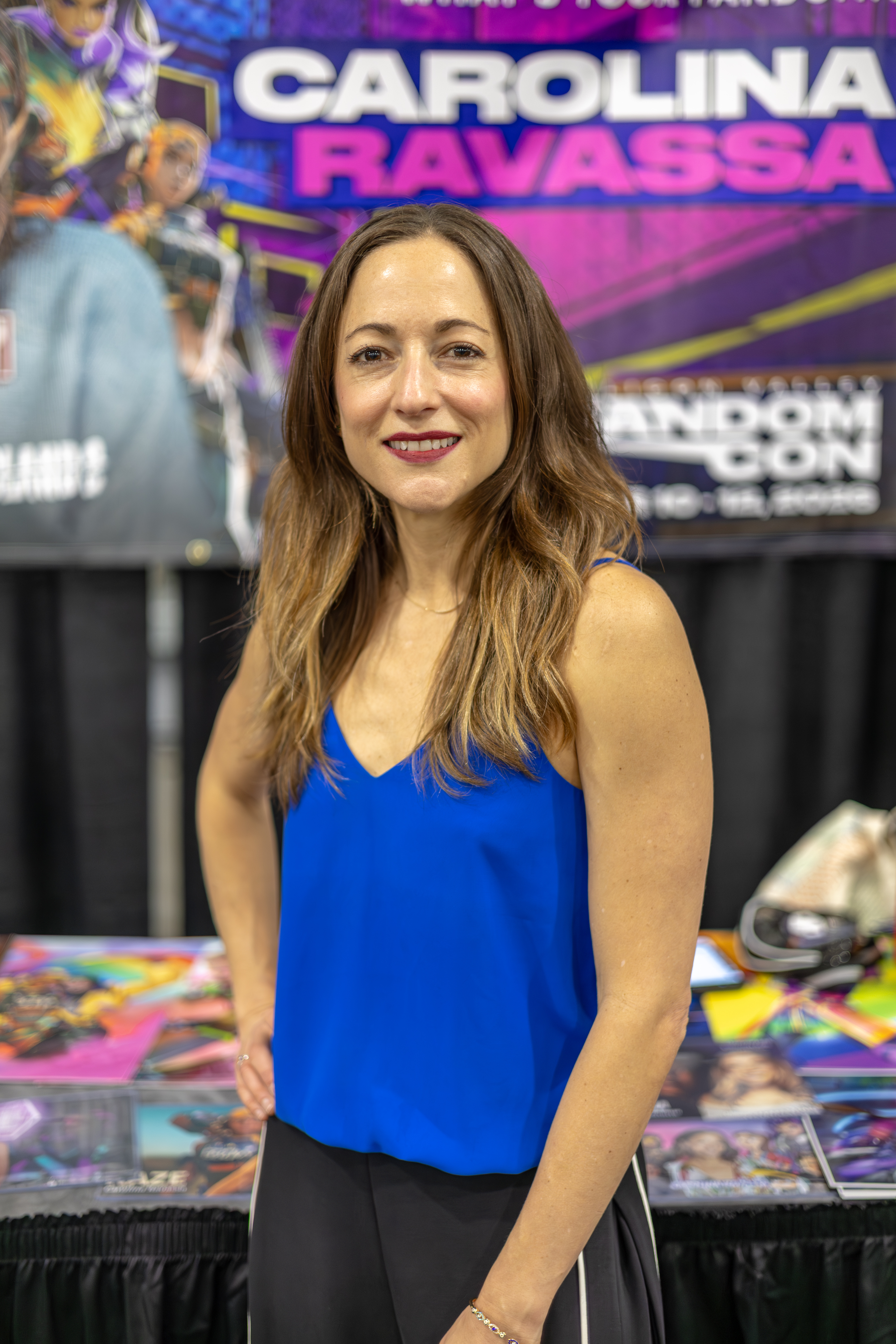
- Ravassa at Fandomcon San Jose in 2026
- Born: 15 June 1985 (age 41); Cali, Colombia
- Citizenship: United States
- Occupation: Actress
- Years active: 2009–present
- Spouse: David Lyerly
- Website: carolinaravassa.com

Carolina Ravassa (born 15 June 1985) is a Colombian actress. A performing arts graduate from Boston College and New York Conservatory for Dramatic Arts, Ravassa is best known outside of Colombia for her voice over work in television series and video games, most notably Sombra from the video game Overwatch and Raze in Valorant. She voices Carolina Grant-Gomez in the Disney Channel animated series Hamster & Gretel and Polaris in X-Men '97.

== Life and career ==
Ravassa grew up in several countries, spending her childhood between Colombia and the United States, and is fluent in four languages: English, Spanish, Portuguese, and Italian. She was interested in acting from a young age and her first role was in a local production of The Sound of Music, in which she played Gretel. She studied in Spain and Italy, and was inspired by the power of socio-political change through Theatre of the Oppressed with Augusto Boal in Brazil. She was educated at Boston College, receiving her Theatre Arts degree, as well as undergoing a year of acting for film/TV at the New York Conservatory for Dramatic Arts.

In 2010, Ravassa made an appearance in the Disney film Step Up 3D, where she starred as the character Kristin. In 2014, she appeared in two episodes of Showtime's The Affair as Jules. Ravassa has worked as a voice actress. Her video game appearances include her role as Taliana Martinez from the game Grand Theft Auto V in 2013, and Sombra in Blizzard's 2016 game Overwatch.

Ravassa produces and stars in the webseries Hispanglo-Saxon, where she explores her life as a white Latina in New York.

Outside acting, Ravassa is a dancer, being particularly drawn to salsa dancing.

== Filmography ==
=== Film ===
Year(s)	Title	Role	Notes
2009	Inside the Mind of Etta Netterman	Etta Netterman	Short film
2009	Nueva York	Colombian Wife	Short film
2010	Step Up 3D	Kristin	
2010	Love Between the Lines	Julie	Short film
2011	I Am Julia	Diana Castillo	Short film
2011	5ive: Thirty One (5:31)	Ada B. Rubia	Short film
2012	Maybe Tomorrow	Kiah Mendoza	
2013	Follow the Leader	Ashley	Short film
2014	The Re-Gift	Vanessa	Short film
2014	5	Emily Richards	
2014	The Affair	Jules	Recurring role (2 episodes)
2015	Brasilia: City of the Future	Carolina	Short film
2015	Millie and the Lords	Lucy	
2016	Overwatch: Infiltration	Sombra (voice)	Short film
2018	El Gallo	Sonia	
2018	Saint Nicholas	Iris	
2020	The Happy Side	Carla	Short film

=== Television ===
Year(s)	Title	Role	Notes
2015	Alternatino	Zumba Dancer	Episode: "Perfecting the Automated Voice"
2015–2020	Hispanglosaxon	Multiple Roles	Lead role (21 episodes)
2017	Dopamine	Alice	Recurring role
2017	Mr. Robot	Woman	Episode: "eps3.8_stage3.torrent"
2017	LaGolda	LaGolda (voice)	Miniseries
2018	Suspense	Corporal Haedo	Episode: "Pioneer"
2019	Big City Greens	Female Hygienist (voice)	Episode: "Hurty Tooth"
2019	The Loud House	Ana Ronalda (voice)	Episode: "No Show with the Casagrandes"
2019–2021	Victor and Valentino	Itzel, various voices (voice)	11 episodes
2020	Power Players	Zoe, Cleo Leball (voice)	Recurring role
2020	Onyx Equinox	Zyanya (voice)	Main role
2021	Baby Shark's Big Show!	Mariana, Becky (voice)	4 episodes
2021	Maya and the Three	Barbarian Princess (voice)	4 episodes
2021	Ridley Jones	Mother Penguin (voice)	2 episodes
2021–2022	The Casagrandes	Principal Valenzuela, Girl #3 (voice)	Recurring role
2022	Big Nate	Veronica (voice)	Episode: "Wilderness Warriors"
2022	Spidey and His Amazing Friends	Corn Dog Vendor (voice)	Episode: "Too Much Fun"
2022	Backwards Faces		Executive producer
2022–2025	Hamster & Gretel	Carolina Grant-Gomez (voice)	Main role
2023	Royal Crackers	The Traveler (voice)	Episode: "Casa de Darby"
2023	What If...?	Queen Isabella of Spain (voice)	Episode: "What If... Kahhori Reshaped the World?"
2026	X-Men '97	Lorna Dane / Polaris (voice)	Main cast (season 2); 4 episodes

=== Video games ===
Year(s)	Title	Role	Notes
2012	Max Payne 3	The Local Population	Uncredited
2013	Grand Theft Auto V	Taliana Martinez	
2016	Overwatch	Sombra	
2018	Just Cause 4	People of Solis	
2020	Valorant	Raze	
2020	Marvel's Avengers	Additional voices	
2020	Cyberpunk 2077	Additional voices	
2020	Legends of Runeterra	Ixtali Sentinel, Giselle	
2021	Far Cry 6	VO	
2022	Shatterline	Brisa	
2022	Overwatch 2	Sombra	
2023	Dead Island 2	Carla	
2024	Dragon Age: The Veilguard	Andarateia Cantori	
2025	Date Everything!	Bobby Pinn, Smokalicious	
