= Moira (Overwatch) =

Fictional character from Overwatch

Moira O'Deorain
- Overwatch character
- Moira's appearance in Overwatch
- First appearance: Overwatch (2017)
- Created by: Arnold Tsang
- Voiced by: Genevieve O'Reilly

In-universe information
- Class: Support
- Origin: Dublin, Ireland
- Nationality: Irish

Moira O'Deorain is a character who appears in the 2016 video game Overwatch, a Blizzard Entertainment–developed first-person hero shooter, and the resulting franchise. First introduced in a 2017 tie-in comic, she was later added as a playable character in an update for the game, and returned for its sequel. Voiced by Genevieve O'Reilly, Moira serves as a healer who can refill her resources by damaging enemies with her main attack. Within the Overwatch story, she is an Irish geneticist who refuses to let any ethical constraints interfere with scientific advancement, and works with the terrorist group Talon to this end while posing as a member of the scientific community. Since the game's release she has appeared in various spinoff media related to the franchise, including comics and merchandise.

Designed as a Support-class character able to also deal a large amount of damage, she is able to both heal allies or alternatively siphon health from enemies. Moira has been positively received from video game media writers and the game's fan base alike since her unveiling, with the latter lauding her as a queer icon. Media writers have praised her characterization and role as a villain within the game's story. Her visual design, particularly her androgyny, has also been especially well-received. Seen as a core driver of the character's critical and fan acclaim, it has earned her frequent comparison to actor and musician David Bowie.

== Conception and development ==
Moira's animation and decorative graphics reference anime such as Akira, Evangelion, Naruto, and Dragon Ball.

Developed for Overwatch, Moira was created from the team's desire to introduce an "evil healer" into the game. Assistant Art Director Arnold Tsang looked at concept art for Titan, a cancelled Blizzard Entertainment project, and found unused designs built around tentacles to fit the concept he was looking for. The preliminary sketches revolved around them, but also worked in two other features they wanted to portray with the character: making the character feel androgynous to give her a "mysterious feel", and heterochromia. However, the development team felt tentacles visually implied she was a character meant for offensive play, and according to Senior Story Designer Michael Chu the team was unsure how to utilize them in gameplay. Tsang noted that they gave the character a unique silhouette to stand out from a distance, and they tried a giant two-handed "spray cannon" with a tube connecting it to a large backpack. While Tsang was pleased with the results and found a "science" theme was working for the design, her silhouette resembled another Overwatch character, Zarya.

As a result, the design team took a step back to consider what type of weapon the character would use and a wider variety of appearances, including a male martial artist with a large left arm, a sleek woman in a bodysuit, and a short green man with a gun and tubes extending into a backpack. During this process, they examined what they'd learned from developing the game and the importance of giving new characters ties to existing playable characters. To this end, they made her a member of Talon, the game's terrorist organization and had her previously be a member of "Blackwatch", a covert ops branch of the game's Overwatch global defense force. Liking elements of each design, the development team combined them together with the original design sketch by Tsang. In particular, Tsang wanted to have the character keep a "dark" vibe that would fit someone associated with Talon, but also wanted to include the gaunt face of the initial draft and long sleeves that implied to hold throwable weapons. The character development team additionally worked anime references into her design and movement to help give her a more dynamic and distinctive feel amongst the cast. This was further emphasized in the 2023 April Fools update for the game, where her voice line when using her "ultimate" ability was temporarily changed to "Kamehameha!" in reference to the similarities between it and the Kamehameha move from the Dragon Ball anime.

While early concepts would have had Moira throwing syringes hidden in her sleeves, the concept was altered due to the nature of Overwatch being a first person shooter, with the attacks coming from her hands directly and the colors of the tubes changing from yellow to purple depending if she was healing or attacking. According to concept artist Ben Zhang, her hands themselves were meant to represent the fact she was neither good nor bad as a character, with her left hand that would apply healing to allies meant to appear more human, while her right that drained health from enemies appeared corrupted. This duality was also intended to be reflected in her hand poses, with her healing gestures meant to be comforting, while her damaging gestures aggressive and menacing. Chu additionally felt the sleeves gave her a warlock feel, and was pleased that her animations leaned into this aspect. However the sleeves also proved troublesome for technical animator Hak Lee, who worked over several months to ensure they moved properly and matched her motions.

=== Design ===
Standing 6 feet 5 inches tall, Moira is an Irish woman with short red hair brushed back. Her eyes are heterochromatic, her right red and her left blue. A metallic eyepiece surrounds her left eye, while her right arm is visibly withered and a dark blue, ending in sharp fingernails. Her outfit consists of a long black coat with flowing sleeves, black pants, and black shoes that end in points. Electronic equipment is overlaid on her waist, arms, and ankles that have small spikes protruding from them, while a half-circle shaped device rests on the back of her head at ear level. Several tubes are visible through her attire, while two large ones go up her shoulders over her collarbones to a large backpack device that has a large rotating protrusion of the same color embedded in the bottom. The color of these tubes are dependent on whether she is healing allies or damaging enemies, appearing yellow for the former and purple for the latter. For her appearance in Overwatch 2, her outfit is now silver colored, and her right arm is completely exposed from the shoulder downward. Said arm has changed significantly, now appearing completely purple with swollen veins, resembling some of her early concept art. It's connected to her body at the shoulder via black electronics, with a tube running to a silver brace where the electronics meet the arm.

Like other Overwatch characters, Moira received skins, unlockable cosmetic items to change her in-game appearance, and were intended to embrace different aspects of her character. In particular, her "Oasis" skin represents her time as a geneticist in a scientific community, implementing science themes into the design while also trying to follow the color scheme of the in-game stage with the same name. Likewise, her "Blackwatch" skin was meant to illustrate her time with the group, giving her a black militaristic outfit with armor and a beret. When the beret drew some criticism, the Overwatch social media account on Twitter edited various headwear over the image such as a clown wig, bunny ears, and wizard's hat in response to the tweets, asking in a tongue-in-cheek manner if the new look was "better?" In contrast to the previous skin, the "Glam" skin was meant as a tribute to 1970's glam rock, giving her blue hair with a tighter hairstyle, a four-pointed star painted on her face, a pink and gold outfit with a plunging neckline, and a crescent moon necklace. Tsang noted the tubes were also modified, with the liquid inside meant to appear akin to lava lamps, and considered it one of his favorite skins to make for her.

== Appearances ==
Moira O'Deorain is an Irish scientist in the 2016 video game Overwatch. First appearing in the 2017 tie-in comic "Masquerade" as an unnamed member of terrorist group Talon's inner council, she was introduced in an update to the game later that year as a playable character. A scientist from Dublin, Ireland, after being ostracized for her controversial scientific methods which often took significant risks including experimenting upon herself, she was enlisted by the global peace keeping force "Overwatch" for its black ops division, "Blackwatch". This was elaborated upon in game in April 2018 as part of an event titled "Retribution".

However after an incident in which her involvement with the group was revealed, Blackwatch was disbanded. She is then funded by Talon, who make use of her research findings while she poses as a member of the scientific community "Oasis". She is responsible for managing Reaper's medical condition that gave him his abilities in an effort and keeping him alive. Moira is voiced by Genevieve O'Reilly, an Irish-Australian actress that the team felt was perfect for the role and gave authenticity to her character.

=== Gameplay ===
In Overwatch, Moira is classified as a Support-class character, meant to provide aid for her team. In interviews however Overwatch executive producer Jeff Kaplan has labeled Moira as a "hybrid" character: categorized as a healer, but also able to deal a high amount of damage. Her main weapon is the "Biotic Grasp", which allows her to store biotic energy by draining health from a nearby enemy in a cone-of-fire in front of her with her right arm, while also healing her. She can switch firing modes to then spend that energy to project a stream from her left hand to heal allies in front of her. Targets obstructed by an enemy shield ability cannot be targeted by either weapon fire. When not attempting to heal allies, biotic energy will also slowly replenish itself over time, but not as fast as if draining health from an enemy.

Moira also has several abilities that require activation, though the first two have a "cooldown" period after use and are unable to be used again during that duration. The first, "Fade", makes her invisible and invulnerable to damage, as well as increasing her movement speed for a short period of time. The second, "Biotic Orb", fires one of two types of large sphere projectiles depending on player choice: a yellow one that will heal allies it passes through or by, or a purple one that will harm enemies in the same fashion. Either orb will bounce off walls and structures while active, and will disappear after a fixed period of time.

Lastly, her "Ultimate" ability, called "Coalescence", must be charged before use. The ability charges slowly during the course of gameplay, and can be charged faster through damage dealt to the enemy team or healing provided to allies. Once full the ability can be activated to fire a beam that heals all allies and damages all opponents it passes through, bypassing any shields that may be in place while also healing her for each enemy damaged. Additionally her movement speed is also increased for the duration of the attack. Early in development this move was called "OPAF" (an acronym for "OverPowered As Fuck"), and originally would have both surrounded her a ball of swirling energy while also removing the cooldown period from her activated abilities during its duration.

== Promotion and reception ==
Prior to Moira's Overwatch release, her inclusion was hinted at via a document added to the game's "Oasis" map. Shortly afterward she was unveiled at Blizzcon 2017, and to further promote the character, cosplayer Libby Ives was commissioned to portray the character at the convention and take photos with guests. Several items of merchandise have also been released for the character, such as a Funko Pop figure.

Upon her unveiling at BlizzCon 2017, Moira was positively received, with Kotaku's Cecilia D'Anastasio noting that she was picked far higher by players over other post-release Overwatch characters. She elaborated that Moira's gameplay felt "intuitive", and opined that the character "immediately feels like she's meant to be in Overwatch, something other new heroes' designs didn't quite manage." Several of her attacks and movements have been compared to existing anime characters, including a comparison of running animations from Naruto, and Goku's "Kamehameha". In addition, Kotaku noted that fans developed their own slang and shorthand for the character's abilities: her Biotic Grasp has been shorthanded to "pee", while its alternate fire is called "suck", with inside humor having also arisen from such slang. Renata Price of Vice in particular described her as the best-designed character in both Overwatch games, using her an example of how they were "great games with great ideas" while also an oddity in regards to the other characters with how uniquely she played. She additionally felt for Overwatch 2 to survive as a game, it needed additional "less aim-focused" characters of the same vein as Moira.

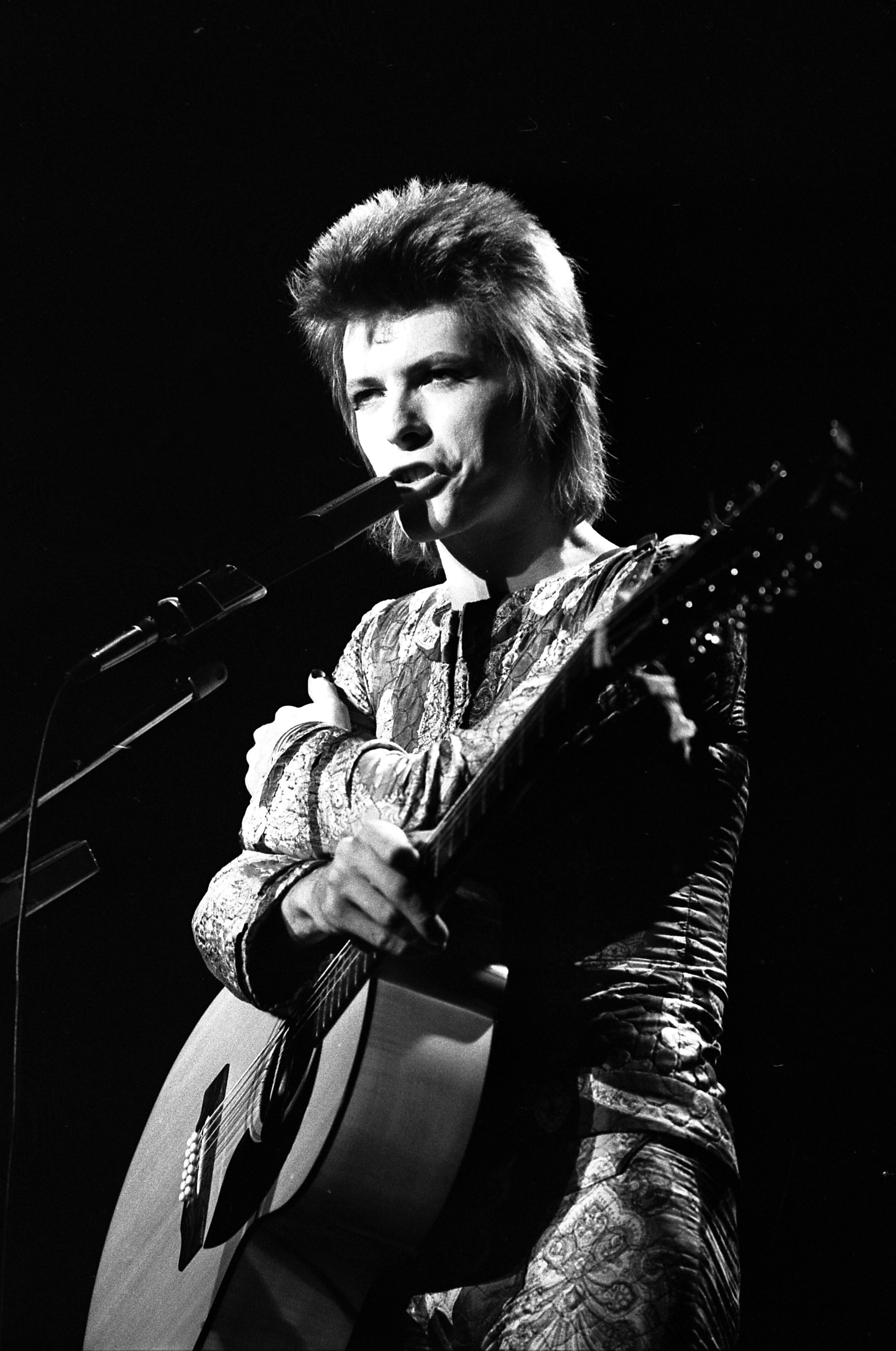
Moira's design has been compared to singer-songwriter David Bowie.

Matt Cox of Rock Paper Shotgun praised her aesthetics and demeanor, stating that "the whole 'life with one hand, death with the other' gimmick" may appear "hackneyed" to some, but worked in Moira's favor due to the visual contrast between her hands that utilized each ability. Ben Barrett of PCGamesN opined that "she continues Overwatch's theme of being just off-center enough to be unique" due to her appearance and character. GameRevolution's Michael Leri praised her visual design, calling her "a unique take on the 'mad scientist' archetype with her rail-thin, angular build and androgynous outward appearance", while praising the developers for not leaning into her ancestry or red hair for tropes common to such characters. Her visual design has been likened to David Bowie by multiple sources due to her visual appearance, as well as her heterochromatic eyes, a trait visually similar to a childhood injury sustained by the late musician causing one of his pupils to be permanently dilated.

Polygon's Cass Marshall described Moira as having a "completely awesome visual design", and further added that while "not perfect", they felt the character was a step in the right direction as "she's sleek, she's decadently evil, and she looks just as dangerous in a lab coat". Marshall further noted that the visual cues in her design taken from anime and Bowie rounded it out with charm without detracting from the character's "malicious aura". They also praised the design for not relying on common tropes found in most female video game characters, noting her androgynous appearance and visual contrast against other female characters in Overwatch. Marshall further called her face her most striking feature, citing her strong features and androgynous appearance, and emphasizing fan reaction to the character followed a similar sentiment with many artists focusing on her face. In terms of character background in the Overwatch universe, they emphasized her role as an opposite to fellow character Mercy, and how fans had also focused on this element drawing them at odds with each other. Kotaku's Gita Jackson has also noted how some fans of the game often ship the two characters. In a later article, Marshall once again praised Moira, calling her the best villain in Overwatch due to her visual impact on and interactions with other characters, but also striking "a really great balance between having understandable, relatable motivations and still being evil and dangerous", and felt this worked better in her favor than it did other series villains such as Doomfist.

Despite her sexuality not being outright stated by Blizzard Entertainment, Moira has been cited as a queer icon, as well as a character non-binary cosplayers feel comfortable portraying due to being a "masculine of center AFAB" character. Michael Leri attributed this to the fact the character's design did not "subscribe to the shallow and overused extremes of both sides of the gender spectrum", calling it refreshing not only in Overwatch but gaming as a whole and a positive for people who could identify with her. Mic journalist Tim Mulkerin noted that during her reveal, many people questioned if the character would be transgender or perhaps gender non-conforming, in part due to her appearance in the Masquerade story but also her similarity to Bowie. However, he added some fans voiced concerns over such a portrayal due to her association with Talon, feeding into the "all-too-common trope of depicting those who exist outside the gender binary as evil, mysterious tricksters" commonly seen in media. Ana Valens of The Mary Sue described her as "butch, incredibly androgynous, and has that perfect level of queer-coded villainess energy that infiltrated so many of our favorite cartoons as baby gays", further adding that her transhumanism obsession led many to assume she was transgender, or at the very least bisexual, and called her a "sleek addition to the Overwatch universe". However, the paper Hidden Bodies and Masculine Minds by Shirley McPhaul Castro argued that the perceived androgyny of her design was defeated by her easily discernible breasts, and argued unless the body was purposefully hidden, it would be difficult to display a female character as gender neutral.
