= Ramattra =

Fictional character in the Overwatch franchise

- Overwatch character
- First game: Overwatch 2 (2023)
- Created by: Qiu Fang
- Voiced by: Ramon Tikaram

In-universe information
- Race: Omnic
- Class: Tank

Ramattra is a character who first appeared in the 2023 video game Overwatch 2, a Blizzard Entertainment–developed first-person hero shooter.

== Conception and development ==
In 2017, lead concept artist Qui Fang was developing designs for Overwatch's "Null Sector", a villain group of sentient robots called omnics. While working on them, one in particular stuck out to him and the development team: a "pharaoh" type unit intended to be a lieutenant. Deciding he would make a great playable character for the game, they chose to develop him further. Early planned concepts were designed to keep an Egyptian theme, and his abilities were based around wielding nanites resembling sand. However, as they developed the character into a leader and protector of his people, later iterations leaned into shepherd and nomadic archetypes, giving him a large crooked staff as a main design point. While the staff was originally intended to have a lantern of nanites suspended from it, they simplified it visually into a swirling orb.

During development they realized they needed to give the character "size and mass" to be able to fulfill his intended role as a "Tank" type of character visually as well as functionally, so they gave him a secondary form called "Nemesis". The "form" is actually a sort of suit that encases his actual body, with early concepts having sand envelop his body fully to make him significantly larger. The finalized design incorporated a large secondary set of arms extending from his shoulders, with his original arms crossed over his chest to help him look further intimidating. His multiple arms in this mode were inspired by earlier concepts of fellow Overwatch character Zenyatta, whose design was also inspired by religious archetypes of multi-armed figures.

=== Design ===
Ramattra stands 6 feet 4 inches tall. Triangular shapes were heavily used in his design such as his cape, head and hair, and according to Fang were done to give him an "air of powerfulness, intimidation and just make him feel a little sinister." Meanwhile, his skeletal aspects and heavy use of purple in his color scheme were added to keep him consistent with the look of other Null Sector units.

Like other Overwatch characters, Ramattra received skins, unlockable cosmetic items to change his in-game appearance. The two forms the character had caused some difficulty for the design team, as they had to make sure any skin they developed would fit both characters while maintaining the same visual silhouettes so players could identify them at a glance. In particular, a skin themed after the Greek mythological figure Poseidon added more human aspects to his design, emphasizing his physique while his Nemesis form took inspiration from the mythological kraken.

== Appearances ==
Ramattra is an R-7000 Ravager, a commando Omnic created by the "god program" Anubis during the Omnic Crisis; Ravagers became particularly hated by humans because of their actions during the war, and Ramattra is one of the few remaining. Seeking a purpose for himself beyond war, Ramattra joined the Shambali, an order of Omnic monks in the Himalayas, under the tutelage of Tekhartha Mondatta. It was during this time that he first met Zenyatta and introduced him to the teachings of the Shambali, considering him a brother. However, Ramattra broke with the Shambali because of humans' continued oppression against Omnics and Mondatta's insistence on peace with humans, and left on a crusade to liberate Omnics from human control. He became one of the founders of Null Sector, and planned out the King's Row uprising, which was defeated by Overwatch (played out in Uprising, one of Overwatch's Archive events). The failure of the uprising led Ramattra to more extreme measures; after the surviving leaders abandoned him, he began to forge Null Sector into an army to liberate all Omnics, whether they wished to be freed or not.

He was briefly introduced during the 2022 Overwatch League playoffs. Prior to his announcement, Ramattra also first appeared in the story-based game mode "Storm Rising", where he is offered an alliance with Talon by Doomfist. He was released in Overwatch 2 on December 6, 2022, along with the second season of the game during its early access period.

=== Gameplay ===
In Overwatch, Ramattra is classified as a Tank-class character, designed to absorb large amounts of damage from the enemy team in team compositions while protecting their teammates. In his primary form his weapon fires a stream of projectiles at enemies. Ramattra can convert to his Nemesis form by activating an ability with the same name, which in addition to changing his attacks will grant him additional health and increase his movement speed. The ability however only lasts a short duration before reverting him back to his primary form, after which a "cooldown" period starts before it can be activated again. While active his attacks will change, generating waves of energy by punching the air with his large fists. Alternatively he can hold the alternate fire to "Block", taking further reduced damage from any attacks directly front of him, though causes him to move more slowly while held.

Ramattra also has two other activated abilities, each with their own cooldown period after use. "Void Barrier" will create a temporary shield placed in front of Ramattra, that can absorb incoming attacks for a short duration or until it has taken significant damage, and can only be used in his primary form. On the other hand, "Ravenous Vortex" can be used in either form to create a swirling vortex of energy at a fixed location. Enemies caught in its area of effect will have their movement speed reduced, take damage over time, and are forced to the ground if jumping or airborne. Lastly, his Ultimate ability, "Annihilation", must be charged before use. The ability charges slowly during the course of gameplay, and can be charged faster through damage dealt to the enemy team. Once full the ability can be activated to instantly convert Ramattra to his Nemesis form if not already active, while streams of nanobots radiate from him and attack all nearby enemies.

== Promotion and reception ==
Ramattra was well received since his debut. Ash Parrish in an article for The Verge noted that while the developers attempted to make Ramattra fearsome, she instead found him "sexy" from an aesthetic perspective, due to his "long techno braids and his robotic abs" and particularly his voice. Liz Richardson of Dot Esports noted a similar reaction from fans, jokingly stating "with a snatched waist and four hands to hold, Ramattra might be the ideal pre-built man", and noting a large amount of fan art arising from the community in this regard. Deyo herself also noted this reaction, though questioned if some of the response may be rooted in misogyny due to how Ramattra's interactions with female characters were portrayed in the character's reveal trailer, in particular fan response towards his conflict with the character Mercy.

Paste's Nico Deyo was critical of the character by comparison. While she noted the same Magneto comparison, with Ramattra portrayed as a "tragic, complicated character that goes too far with his tactics in his quest for freedom", she argued it was a trope Blizzard utilized far too often in their works. She also described his backstory as "neoliberal idea in fiction that turns the messy nuance of liberatory politics into easily digestible villainy", citing the emphasis of "liberation group" in his backstory and the developers calling the character a "revolutionary" as symptomatic of this problem. In their eyes this was further emphasized by the lack of actual story present within the game itself, presenting an issue where "heroes can be evil but not in a conspicuous or enjoyable way".

Deyo additionally felt the character had issues with racist overtones and cultural appropriation through his portrayal as "imposing android with dreadlock analogues who can turn into hulking mass", furthered by the attempt to make omnics an analogue for racial and class oppression, arguing that it both cheapened the struggles it borrow from but also "sidesteps addressing the justifiable fear humanity would have about invulnerable death machines." Deyo attributed some of the issues with the character to Overwatch's role as a commercial product, and emblematic of the "fracture" caused by Overwatch 2's rushed development.

Richard Warren for GameRant appreciated how the game's Invasion storyline fleshed his character out. Noting that Blizzard's emphasis on the omnic social struggle in Overwatch's universe made Ramattra's violence and goals seem understandable and even sympathetic, painting him as willing to go too far and rob other omnics of their autonomy with the Subjugator units helped establish him as a proper villain and a threat that needs to be taken down. This left Warren hopefully for how the story could progress through this aspect, especially if it escalated, and wanting to see the character moments from others that could arise from it.

Meanwhile, the staff of United Daily News highlighted his in-game dialogue with Zenyatta as a standout, enjoying that it felt organic while fans drew art of the characters in romantic tension as a form of shipping. Amy Chen in an article for esports.gg commented on the latter aspect, feeling that engaging in such speculation around characters was one of the more engaging ways for fans of a franchise to connect with one another, with one group of fans creating a 200 page zine celebrating the ship.
