= Vendetta (Overwatch) =

Fictional character in the Overwatch franchise

- Overwatch character
- Vendetta's appearance in Overwatch 2
- First appearance: Overwatch 2 (2025)
- Designed by: Jude Stacey; Shih Kai Chang (design, weapon)
- Voiced by: Chiara Preziosi.

In-universe information
- Alias: La Lupa
- Class: Damage
- Origin: Italy
- Nationality: Italian

Vendetta is the callsign of Marzia Bartalotti, a character who first appeared in the 2023 video game Overwatch 2, a Blizzard Entertainment–developed first-person hero shooter, added to the game's roster in a December 2025 update. Also known as La Lupa, she is voiced by Chiara Preziosi.

== Conception and design ==
Vendetta's character concept went through several iterations through development, with an early iteration being a gladiator defending citizens from fellow character Ramattra's group "Null Sector". However, the developers decided over time to instead create a more villainous character, with narrative designer Jude Stacey taking charge of her character. Her appearance and weapon were designed by artist Kai Chang, who stated on his Artstation account he was given free range to design her character as he saw fit, focusing on making an "awesome dark-skinned girl" that reflected his personal preferences.

== Appearances ==
Vendetta, real name Marzia Bartalotti, is an Italian swordswoman and the daughter of high-ranking Talon member Antonio Bartalotti. After his death at the hands of Blackwatch, the covert arm of Overwatch, she was cast aside by Talon and denied her role within the organization. She later joined the Colosseo gladiatorial games, becoming a successful and popular fighter known as La Lupa, steadily building influence with Europe's elite to enact her plans of avenging her father and reclaiming her family's criminal empire.

Vendetta wields the Palatine Fang, an enormous great sword with a blade made of hard light, which she uses as her primary attack. She can reduce frontal damage and deflect melee attacks with her sword using her Warding Stance, although this depletes her energy. She can lunge forward and execute a 360-degree swing with her Whirlwind Dash, and if she has energy, launch a Projected Edge slice forward. She can perform a Soaring Slice by throwing her sword ahead of her and then flying to its location. Her passive ability, Onslaught, increases her movement and attack speed as she lands successful strikes. Her ultimate, Sundering Blade, does a large amount of damage to all enemies in front of her, damaging through armor, barriers, and overhealth.

== Promotion and reception ==
Vendetta has been heavily compared to Marvel Rivals character Magik in terms of design and gameplay.

Vendetta was introduced in Season 20 in December 2025, with a trial period during Season 19.

After her debut, some criticized her character design as being too similar to Magik, a character in NetEase's Marvel Rivals, due to both characters having similar design aspects and wielding massive swords. This led to a broader comparison between the games by fans who began noticing similarities between other recently introduced characters in both directions. Ryu Jong-hwa of Korean gaming website Gamemeca argued that before accusations of plagiarism should take place it was important to consider the long development times characters for these games undergo, and that the design archetype of a tall woman carrying a large sword was common in various media. Kenneth Shepard of Kotaku had a similar reaction, stating that the character similarities were superficial and the comparisons themselves more of a symptom of how the internet often viewed competing titles, something he felt Rivals had been on the receiving end of since its release.

Other discussions however revolved around the character being regarded as a "safe" design. This stemmed from longstanding criticism of Overwatch 2, which argued that the character designs had lot much of what made them stand out in previous media, and a comment previously made by the developers that suggested they were aiming for marketable, conventionally attractive characters meant to sell in-game cosmetics. By comparison to older, more unique additions to the franchise, Vendetta and predecing character Wuyang were regarded as designs that could be pushed quickly and would be easy to create new skins for. Feliciano Mondigo III of Gfininity eSports statied that while they expected to still see more outlandish characters added to the game in the future, "these 'safe' ones just aren't as memorable as the original roster of heroes in Overwatch's history".

Richard Warren of Game Rant meanwhile felt that Vendetta gave Overwatch a narrative push it desperately needed, and reflected how characters were more integral to the game's story compared to Rival's handling of them. He further felt she was exciting from a gameplay perspective, both well received and heavily discussed in the gameplay community, and was "incredibly fun without feeling unfair" in that regard. PC Gamer's Elie Gould expressed that she was somewhat disappointed that the character was not classified as a Tank in the game, a character archetype commonly associated with being able to protect their team and hold a position. She felt that Overwatch had established characters such as Doomfist or Junker Queen were associated with doing this well, and that Vendetta would have fit into this theme too. Regardless, she found the most interesting aspect of the character to be her backstory, and how it tied to the Blackwatch in-game event, which she considered her favorite. She was keen to see where it led, and what it meant for characters like Reaper that were tied to the event.

However, some saw the character as significantly overpowered, which was further evidenced by her performance in-game. Jason Winter writing for MMOBomb argued that while this was typical of new characters introduced in the game who often would see balance patches over time, Vendetta's unique gameplay presented a significant problem. In particular, he observed that she had a significantly lower skill ceiling than other characters, but also much higher durability. Comparing Overwatch and Rivals, he observed how the former lacked tools at the time to deal with a character like Vendetta, while they were common in the latter. While he personally liked her design, he felt too many factors led to her to being unenjoyable to encounter.

Winter suggested one possible fix was increasing her physical size to match the implications of her durability. Moreso, he proposed better audio cues for her attacks, citing that most were battle grunts with little indication as to what attack she was using, which he found strange for a game series like Overwatch which had been previously praised for its sound design. He also echoed the comparison to Rival's Magik, citing how by comparison Magik had far less mobility than Vendetta, whose own high maneuverability coupled with her other attributes may have been too much for one character.
