= Overwatch =

Video game franchise

- Genres: First-person shooter, hero shooter
- Developer: Blizzard Entertainment
- Publisher: Blizzard Entertainment
- Platforms: Windows, PlayStation 4, Xbox One, Nintendo Switch, PlayStation 5, Xbox Series X/S, Nintendo Switch 2
- First release: Overwatch; May 24, 2016
- Latest release: Overwatch (2023); August 11, 2023

Overwatch (abbreviated as OW) is a multimedia franchise centered on a series of multiplayer first-person shooter (FPS) video games developed by Blizzard Entertainment. Overwatch was published in 2016. Overwatch 2 was published in 2023 and the original game was taken offline upon its release, though Blizzard renamed it back to Overwatch in 2026. Overwatch features hero-based combat between two teams of players fighting over various objectives, along with other traditional gameplay modes.

Released in 2016, Overwatch lacked a traditional story mode. Instead, Blizzard employed a transmedia storytelling strategy to disseminate lore regarding the game's characters, releasing comics and other literary media, as well as animated media that includes short films. The game enjoyed both critical and commercial success, and garnered a devoted following. The fan community around the franchise has produced a large amount of content including art, cosplay, fan fiction, anime-influenced music videos, Internet memes, and pornography.

Blizzard helped launch and promote an esports scene surrounding the game, including an annual Overwatch World Cup, Overwatch League, a minor league, and the Overwatch Champions Series which borrowed elements found in traditional American sports leagues.

== Gameplay ==
Both games in the Overwatch series are team-based hero shooters. Players select a hero character from a large roster (54 as of Season 5), divided among three class types. These are: Tanks, who have higher health and generally meant to help protect their teammates from damage, but are larger and easier to hit; Damage, who act as the team's offensive leads; and Support, who heal, provide buffs for teammates, or de-buff the opposing team. Each role also features sub-roles with extra passives. These sub-roles include 'Initiator', 'Stalwart', and 'Bruiser' for Tank. 'Specialist', 'Flanker', 'Recon', and 'Sharpshooter' for Damage. 'Medic', 'Tactician', and 'Survivor' for Support. Players are generally free to change to different heroes while inside their spawn room during the course of a match in response to the current tactics employed by other players. As of the development of Overwatch 2, a standard game features one tank player, two damage players and two support players, a change from having two of each class in its predecessor. Players choose their class before the match, and can only pick characters within that class for the duration of the game. There are different styles of game modes, however, that allow players to choose characters from any class throughout the game.

Each hero has a skill kit that includes a primary attack, active skills that require a cooldown period before they can be used again, passive skills that remain active at all times, and an Ultimate skill that can only be used once they fill their Ultimate meter either by damaging opponents, mitigating damage, healing teammates or by passively generating it over time.

An update in 2025 saw each hero receive a total of four unique abilities known as perks. Each hero has two minor and two major perks; minor perks consist of smaller changes to a hero's kit, while major perks are intended to affect the match more significantly. At the beginning of each match, all heroes are set to level 1 for each player. As the match progresses, players can individually level up their respective heroes, minor perks are unlocked at level 2, and major perks are unlocked at the maximum level 3. When perks become available, players may only select one of each type of perk; a selected perk becomes irreversibly attached to the current hero for the remainder of the match. If a player switches to another hero mid-match, the previously selected hero retains their level and perk progress.

Game types of Overwatch are split between standard matches, competitive play, custom games, and arcade modes. Standard matches have matchmaking based loosely on the player's skill level as measured by the game. Competitive mode uses more strict matchmaking based on a player's current rank on the competitive ladder, with their rank increasing or decreasing when they win or lose a game, respectively. Arcade modes do not use matchmaking and are generally more experimental modes compared to standard and competitive modes. Custom games are created via the workshop and can be utilised to make game modes that are very different from the base game. The workshop is the software in Overwatch which creates the game using either presets and settings or rules and conditions made by code. These game modes can be published directly onto Overwatch’s custom browse tab or shared off platform using a 5 digit alphanumeric code.

Standard and competitive game modes are randomly selected at the start of each match, and are objective based, requiring teams to control a fixed objective point for a duration of time, or escort a payload to a target zone before match time expires. These modes include:

- Assault (introduced in Overwatch): Also known as 2 Capture Points (or 2CP), Assault has the attacking team tasked with capturing two target points in sequence on the map, while the defending team must stop them. Assault-style maps were removed from main gameplay rotation after Overwatch 2 released but available in the game's arcade mode. It is still available in the game's custom game modes. Since Season 2, Assault-style maps are available in Arcade Mode daily routines.
- Escort (introduced in Overwatch): Also known as "Payload" by the community, The attacking team is tasked with escorting a payload to a certain delivery point before time runs out, while the defending team must stop them. The payload vehicle moves along a fixed track when any player on the attacking team is close to it, increasing in speed if multiple attackers are present, the increase capping at 3, but will stop if a defending player is nearby; should no attacker be near the vehicle, it will start to move backwards along the track. The payload will also heal any attacking players by 10 health per second while they are near the payload. Passing specific checkpoints will extend the match time and prevent the payload from moving backwards from that point.
- Hybrid (Assault/Escort) (introduced in Overwatch): The attacking team has to capture the payload (as if it were a target point from Assault) and escort it to its destination, while the defending team tries to hold them back.
- Control (introduced in Overwatch): Each team tries to capture and maintain a common control point until their capture percentage reaches 100%. This game mode is played in a best-of-three format. Control maps are laid out in a symmetric fashion so no team has an intrinsic position advantage.
- Push (introduced in Overwatch 2's launch): Each team attempts to secure control of a large robot that pushes one of two barriers to the opposing team's side of the map, whilst being escorted by at least one team member, stopping when enemy players are nearby, similar to the payload movement system in Escort. The team that pushes the payload fully to the other side, or furthest into the enemy territory before the time runs out, wins the match.
- Flashpoint (introduced in Overwatch 2 in 2023): Similar to Control, each team attempts to capture and maintain a common control point until their capture percentage reaches 100%. This game mode takes place on significantly larger maps with five separate control points, which take a shorter amount of time to capture as compared to a standard Control map. A central control point is always activated first; after it is secured by one team, the remaining four are activated in a random order. The first team to secure three control points wins.
- Clash (introduced in Overwatch 2 in 2024): Clash maps feature symmetrical maps with five control points. Teams initially vie for control of the central point, with the winning team progressing to the next control point, towards the opponent's base. Opponents can push back by winning control points and shifting the next point away from their base. If a team captures the point closest to the opponent's base, they win. Otherwise the match plays out until one team wins control five times. Since season 1, Clash has been removed from the standard queue and can only be played in the arcade and custom browser.

Arcade modes may include variations of the above modes with experimental rules, and can also include modes like Deathmatch and Capture the Flag. Other common arcade modes include:

- Elimination (introduced in Overwatch in 2016): Two teams face off in a series of rounds, attempting to wipe out the other team; once a player is killed they remain out of the game until the next round, though they can be revived by Mercy's 'Resurrect' ability. If no team has won a round by a certain time, then the winners are decided by the team that can first take a neutral control point. Players cannot change heroes until the next round. Some of these can be played in "lockout" mode, in which the heroes selected by the winning team for a round are "locked" and cannot be selected in future rounds.
- Total Mayhem (introduced in Overwatch): A game mode similar to the base team-versus-team matches, but where all heroes have double health, and all cooldowns are significantly reduced, allowing players to use abilities and ultimates more often, typically creating chaotic matches.
- Mystery Heroes (introduced in Overwatch): Also based on team-versus-team matches, players are randomly assigned a hero when the match starts, with the character changing upon each death.
- Stadium (introduced in Overwatch 2 in 2025): Stadium maps are played in a best-of-seven (in Competitive Play) or best-of-five (in Unranked) format. During each round, players earn in-game currency that then can be used between rounds to purchase improvements for their chosen hero. These rounds are played on different maps of varying game modes, featuring Control, Push and Clash. Stadium also allows players to play from a third-person camera to aid with certain improvement combinations. A recent update added Payload Race as a mode, where the players have to escort a payload to the final destination while preventing the opposing team from doing the same.

== Premise ==
=== Omnic Crisis ===
Overwatch is set sixty years into the future (Note: Upon the 2016 release of the original Overwatch video game) of a fictionalized Earth, as well as thirty years after the "Omnic Crisis" is resolved and six years after the Petras Act is signed.

Omnics are artificial intelligence (AI) robots that were created to assist humans in manufacturing and global economic equality efforts. During this period, humanity prospered as omnics helped stabilize society.

The Omnic Crisis involved "omniums" (large facilities that churned out omnics) beginning to produce hostile omnics, many of which were bastion units. These hostile omnics began attacking humans, beginning their assault in Russia. Individual nations initially responded to the crisis with their own programs. The United States launched the secret Soldier Enhancement Program, modifying soldiers into mercenaries. Jack Morrison and Gabriel Reyes were among the most notable test subjects of the program. Meanwhile, Germany responded to the crisis through the Crusaders, an elite force of soldiers heavily suited in armor inspired by knights and wielding weapons such as hammers. The Crusaders were led by Balderich von Adler, until he handed the reins to a young Reinhardt Willhelm following a battle in Eichenwalde.

Removed from the crisis, scientists on the moon-based Horizon Lunar Colony create genetically modified animals to test long-term habitation in space. Among these animals is an ape named Winston. Other apes on the colony revolted, killing all scientists in the process. However, Winston created a rocket and escaped to Earth.

While Russia opted to handle the waves of omnics on their own, nations failed to quell the crisis individually. As a result, the United Nations (UN) assembled Overwatch, a strike team led by Reyes and Morrison. Reyes served as Overwatch's Strike Commander, leading the task force that included Morrison, Wilhelm, Egyptian sniper Ana Amari, Swedish weapons engineer Torbjörn Lindholm, and Singaporean AI scientist Dr. Mina Liao. Within a few years, the Omnic Crisis was declared over and Overwatch transitioned toward being a peacekeeping organization.

=== Overwatch Generation and Blackwatch ===
After the end of the crisis, an ensuing golden age of heroism and global peace was dubbed the "Overwatch Generation". Despite this, separate human–omnic conflicts sprung up in Korea and Australia. Meanwhile, the Indian-based Vishkar Corporation developed a technology that allowed its users, or "architechs", to create physical objects with light. Vishkar took this technology to Rio de Janeiro and while initially well-intentioned, the corporation began to abuse Rio's population. A group of omnics called the Shambali also emerged. Led by Tekhartha Mondatta, they believe that omnics possess a soul and aim to revitalize human–omnic relations.

A growing rift between Morrison and Reyes arose after the former was promoted to Strike Commander. After Reyes lost command of Overwatch, he took control of Blackwatch, a covert operations unit. American bounty hunter Cole Cassidy, (Note: Known as Jesse McCree when Overwatch released in May 2016, the character was renamed Cole Cassidy in August 2021, following Blizzard's "effort to remove in-game references to real people, particularly developers implicated in allegations of widespread discrimination and harassment at Activision Blizzard.") Irish geneticist Moira O'Deorain, and Japanese cyborg ninja Genji Shimada joined as members of Blackwatch. The latter was part of the eponymous Shimada Clan crime family alongside his brother, Hanzo. After a falling out, the family ordered Hanzo to kill Genji. On the brink of death, Genji was rehabilitated into a cyborg by Overwatch medical director Angela Ziegler.

=== Fall of Overwatch ===
A terrorist organization, Null Sector, meanwhile emerges in London. Lacking rights in England, omnics are forced to live in the Underworld, a city beneath the streets of London. Composed of these omnics facing persecution following the Omnic Crisis' conclusion, Null Sector launches a surprise attack on King's Row. Dismissing orders from the British Prime Minister, Morrison deploys Overwatch agents Wilhelm, Lindholm, Ziegler, and the newly-recruited Lena Oxton on an ultimately successful mission to stop Null Sector's forces.

Blackwatch is enlisted to fight against Talon, a terrorist threat seeking to set off another crisis. While in Italy on a covert operation to kidnap Talon's leader, Reyes ultimately kills him, exposing Blackwatch to the public. Public distrust in the organization begins to swell and the UN launches an investigation into Blackwatch following their fiasco in Italy. Already in a strained relationship, Morrison and Reyes find themselves at further odds with each other as a result. An argument between the two at Overwatch's headquarters in Switzerland ends in an explosion, after which both are presumed dead.

After these events, the UN signed the Petras Act, outlawing any further activity by Overwatch. As any other action would be deemed illegal, Overwatch disbanded.

Both Morrison and Reyes end up surviving, however. Morrison begins a vigilante crusade under the name Soldier: 76 against Overwatch's former enemies. Reyes is able to render himself temporarily incorporeal as a result of a life-saving procedure conducted by O'Deorain. Now operating under the name Reaper, Reyes joins Talon.

=== Recall ===
Six years after the Petras Act is signed, a second Omnic Crisis emerges in Russia. Staying at Watchpoint, a former Overwatch facility based in Gibraltar, Winston follows the developing situation. Reaper then breaks into Watchpoint and attacks Winston. While Winston is able to thwart Reaper, the latter's attack is the catalyst for the former's issuing of a recall of former Overwatch agents. (Note: This recall serves as the start point of the original Overwatch game.) Oxton, known by the call sign Tracer, is the first to answer; she is later followed by Genji, Wilhelm, Lindholm, Cassidy, and Ziegler, known by the call sign Mercy.

After the recall, Reaper and Talon sniper Amélie Lacroix (known as Widowmaker) attempt to steal a gauntlet for their leader Akande Ogundimu. They are stopped by Winston and Tracer. Widowmaker later assassinates Mondatta as he gives a speech in London.

=== Return of Talon ===
Following the assassination of the leader of Talon, his daughter Marzia Bartalotti was due to assume leadership, but was ousted by Doomfist and other Talon members. Denied of her position, she secretly begins developing connections with new associates while training her skills as a swordmaster in coliseum battles, becoming known as Vendetta. Ten years later, she appears at a Talon meeting, challenging Doomfist to combat, and ends up slicing off his arm and asserting control over Talon. With Vendetta's leadership, she begins a series of attacks on Overwatch bases as revenge for the death of her father.

== Development ==
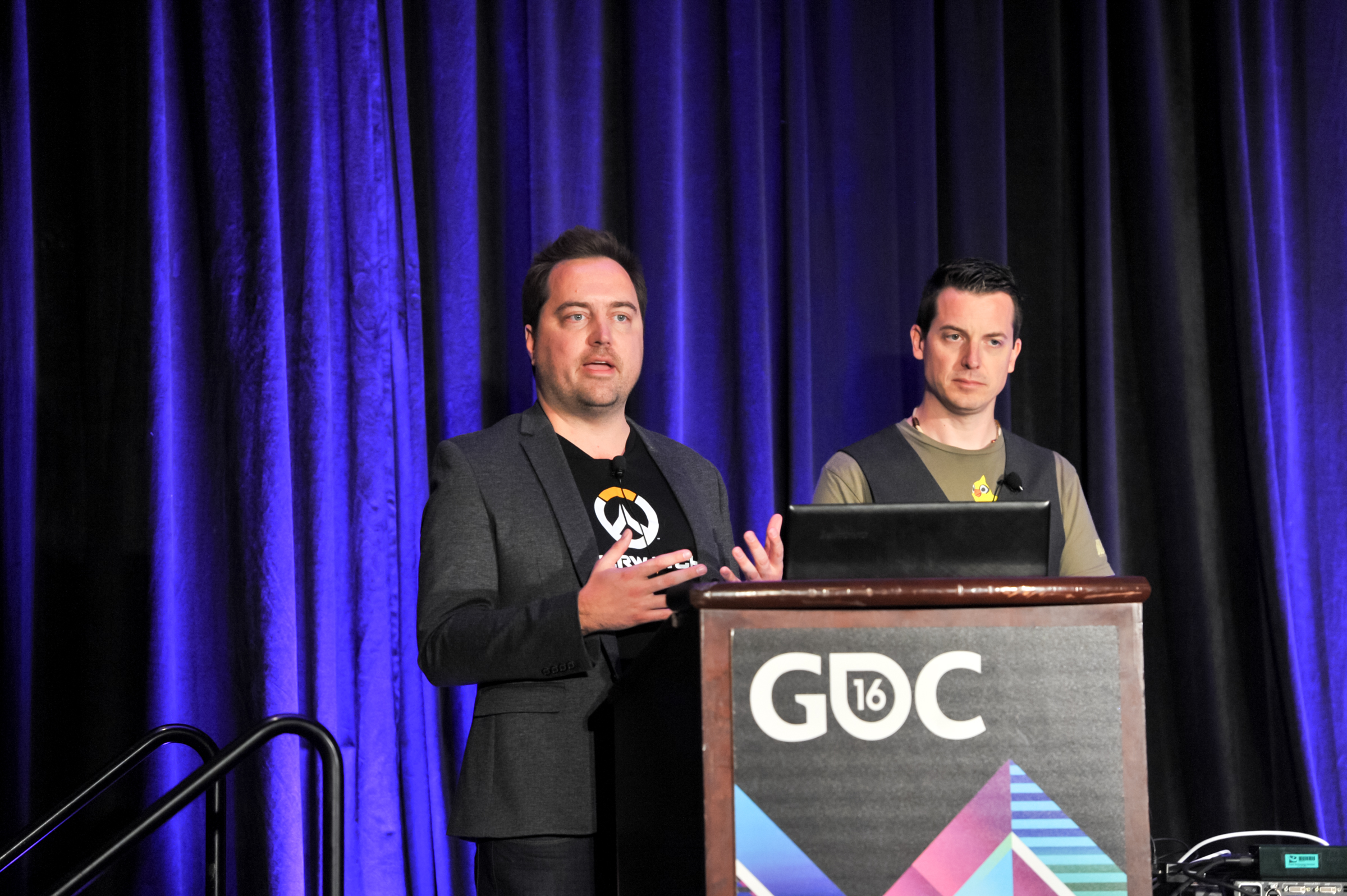
Blizzard employees discussing Overwatch at GDC 2016

Prior to the original game's announcement, Blizzard had been interested in making a team-based multiplayer shooter for a while. Overwatch has its development origins rooted in Titan, a Blizzard project that was cancelled in 2013. Elements of Titan were reworked into Overwatch, which was announced at BlizzCon in November 2014. Overwatch became Blizzard's first new series since they launched Diablo in 1996, as well as their first attempt at making an FPS game. After the game's announcement, Polygon wrote that it "appears to feature Blizzard's signature chunky, slightly cartoonish style." A beta for the game was launched in 2015.

Jeff Kaplan, Michael Chu, and Scott Mercer served as the game's lead director, lead writer, and principal game designer, respectively. Blizzard hired writer Alyssa Wong to Overwatch's writing team in 2018. Kaplan departed from Blizzard in April 2021, after which Aaron Keller took over Kaplan's duties as lead director.

After the release of Overwatch, Blizzard's developers continued to add to the game through free updates, introducing new characters, maps, game modes, and cosmetic items, often as part of seasonal events. The different gameplays of individual heroes were also tuned and patched in response to player feedback and statistics regarding the meta found within the game. As Kaplan followed a philosophy that emphasized players' perception of game balance, he affirmed that meta shifts to Overwatch were beholden to its players and not its developers; Heroes Never Die wrote on Kaplan's belief that if the community thought Overwatch's meta was broken, then it actually was and vice versa. This would go on until the announcement of Overwatch 2 at Blizzcon 2019 introducing a sequel to the game, promising a new PvE story based game mode that explored a new Omnic Crisis as well as new PvE game modes that focused on leveling characters to unlock new ability traits. As development for Overwatch 2 was happening, the development of Overwatch itself saw a slower release of content. Finally, Overwatch 2 would release in August of 2023 after facing multiple delays due to the COVID pandemic. Overwatch was unable to keep its promise of a full PvE story game mode after release with the developers shifting focus towards PvP gameplay. This was and still is seen as a controversial decision with many feeling like there was no need for a sequel to be made. After its release, Overwatch 2 would continue the previous cycle of releasing new heroes, maps, and game modes. In February 2026, as part of a new story and seasonal approach, Blizzard rebranded Overwatch 2 as simply Overwatch.

In China, Overwatch is managed by NetEase in partnership with Blizzard. This excludes an 18 month period from 2023 to 2025 where the partnership had fallen apart, but later renegotiate. In South Korea, Nexon will take over management of the game in partnership with Blizzard by August 2026.

== Games ==
Release timeline
| 2016 | Overwatch |
2017
2018
2019
2020
2021
2022
| 2023 | Overwatch 2 |
2024
2025
| TBA | Overwatch Rush |

=== Overwatch series ===
The original Overwatch game was released by Blizzard on May 24, 2016, for PC platforms, as well as eighth generation console platforms PlayStation 4 and Xbox One. A version of the game developed by Iron Galaxy for the Nintendo Switch was later released on October 15, 2019. Blizzard shut down servers for the game on October 3, 2022.

Blizzard released Overwatch 2 via early access on October 4, 2022. The game was made free-to-play on PC, along with ports for the Nintendo Switch 2, PlayStation 5, and Xbox Series S/X platforms, supporting full cross-platform play. As of December 2025 there are 44 playable heroes. With a major update in February 2026, Blizzard rebranded Overwatch 2 as just Overwatch, addressing the development team's new focus on incorporating more narrative via seasonal storylines and treating Overwatch as a "forever game".

A mobile version, Overwatch Rush, was unveiled in February 2026, being developed by an internal team separate from Team 4 in Blizzard. The game is presented in a top down mode to be more amenable to mobile players. The planned release and the extent of available heroes and game modes is not yet known at the time of this announcement.

=== Heroes of the Storm crossover ===
Until the warm reception of Overwatch's beta, Blizzard was unsure of representing Overwatch characters in Heroes of the Storm, their crossover multiplayer battle online arena (MOBA) video game. Around a month prior to the release of Overwatch, Blizzard added Tracer to the MOBA, modeled by Marc Brunet who was one of the original artists on Titan; PC Gamer called Tracer's addition to the game "a marketing move [for Overwatch], for sure." Afterwards, other characters and map elements from Overwatch were incorporated into Heroes. By the time the game transitioned to a maintenance mode in July 2022, a total of nine characters became playable in Heroes of the Storm, (Note: Ana, D.Va, Genji, Hanzo, Junkrat, Lúcio, Mei, Tracer, and Zarya were the nine Overwatch franchise characters added to Heroes of the Storm.) while battlegrounds based on the Overwatch maps Hanamura and Volskaya Industries were also included. A number of Overwatch-themed skins have been introduced for Heroes of the Storm's "Overwatch cosplay" event in May 2021.

== Esports ==
While not originally developed with esport support in mind, Overwatch would see a considerable esport scene prop up around the franchise shortly after its first game's release. According to Kaplan, although Blizzard had success with committing to esports while developing Starcraft II, they found "it's dangerous to be overly committed to esport too early in the lifespan of the game." To avoid sacrificing approachability as they did with Starcraft II, Blizzard opted to gauge how the Overwatch community would develop around esports over time as they did with Hearthstone. This included the introduction of the game's competitive mode some months after the game's launch after seeing how players took towards Overwatch; Blizzard saw the ladder-approach they used as a means for skilled players to reach high ranks as to be noticed by esport team organizers. ESPN and Gamasutra wrote that the game had a favorable foundation to succeed as an esports title, citing the game's sufficient difference from established esports games, its variety in maps and characters, and strong support from its developer, as well as its speed and short match times.

The first organized, prize-winning competitions for Overwatch started in mid-2016, a few months after launch. The esports organizer ESL held the first international Overwatch competition in August 2016, dubbed the Overwatch Atlantic Showdown. The competition used four open qualifiers beginning in June, followed by regional qualifiers and then a final online qualifier. Eight teams then competed for a six-figure prize in the finals to be held at Gamescom 2016 from August 20 to 21. Turner Broadcasting's ELeague announced the first Overwatch Open tournament, starting in July 2016, with a total prize pool of $300,000, with plans to broadcast the finals on Turner's cable channel TBS in September 2016.

Overwatch achieved a high level of popularity as an esport in South Korea, with the first game surpassing League of Legends and topping gaming cafés in the country in terms of player count. The game also influenced the creation of an esports tournament in the region, under the brand name "APEX", which operated until January 2018.

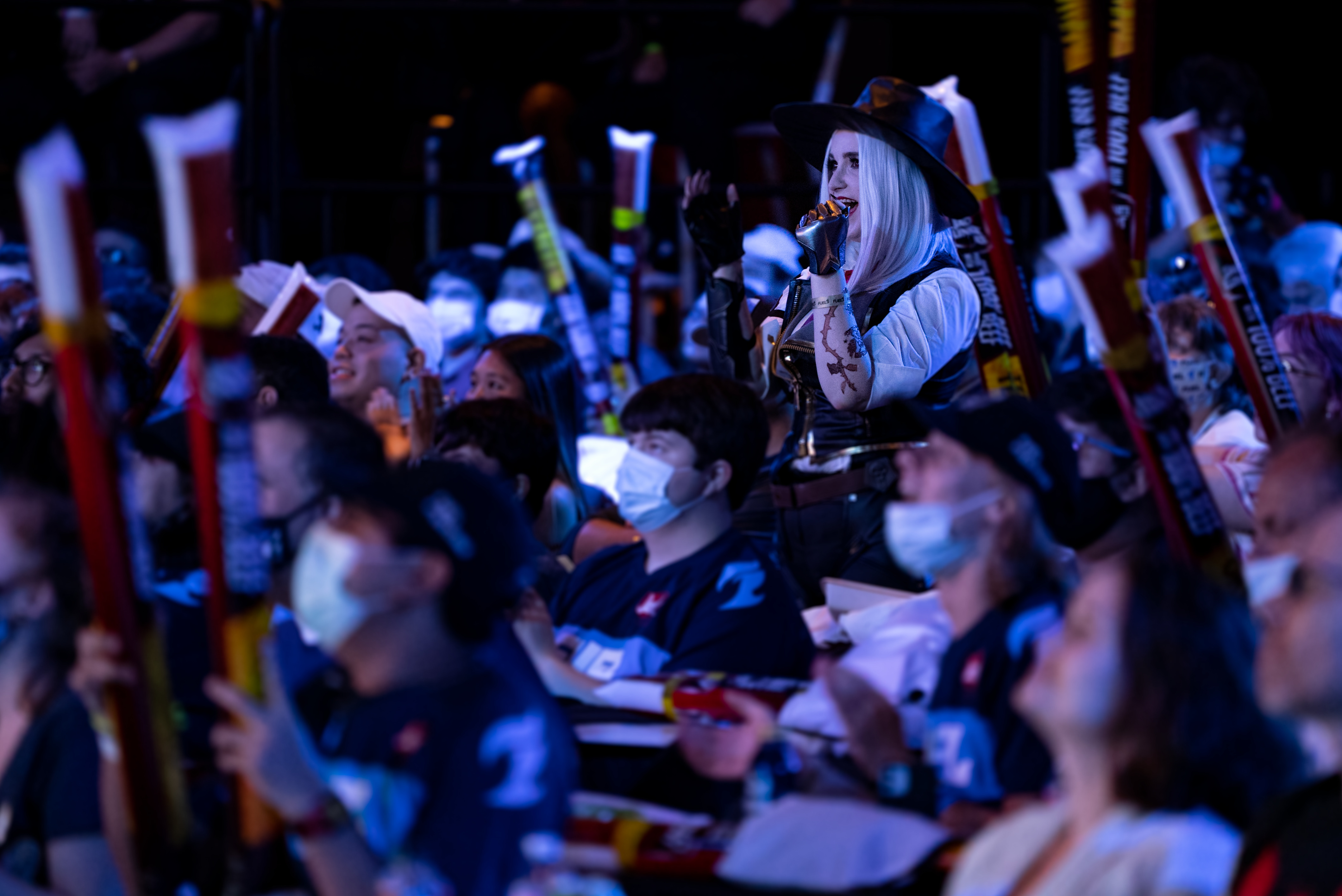
Fans watching the "Battle for Texas" match between the OWL's Dallas Fuel and Houston Outlaws

Blizzard announced its own official Overwatch World Cup (OWWC) tournament in August 2016. The first annual OWWC would be played later that November at BlizzCon 2016, where Blizzard also announced the formation of their Overwatch League (OWL).

The OWL borrowed various elements from traditional sports leagues like the National Football League (NFL), including a developmental league called Overwatch Contenders (OWC). The OWL also implemented permanent teams organized in league placements rather than the use of promotion and relegation. The OWL secured billionaire sports team owners to become OWL team owners and established 12 franchises around the world by September 2017, with plans to expand further in later seasons, which would be 20 at its peak. Contracted players on these franchises were guaranteed a minimum salary, benefits, and revenue sharing. Preseason games for the inaugural OWL season took place in December 2017. The first OWL regular season game was played between the Los Angeles Valiant and San Francisco Shock to a sold out crowd at Blizzard Arena in January 2018. To support viewership of its professional competitions, Blizzard released a companion Overwatch application in November 2018, which allowed viewers to watch matches through a spectator mode. However, by 2023 the Overwatch League would collapse owing partly due to the COVID-19 pandemic (although some said that the pandemic would ultimately extend the OWL's shelf life) and a lack of interest from owners.

The OWL would be replaced in 2024 by the Overwatch Champions Series (OWCS), a partnership between Activision-Blizzard, ESL and WDG Esports that moreso resembled traditional esports circuits. The OWCS will be made up of 3 regions, with North America and EMEA being each one big region with tournaments having Swiss-style Open Qualifying followed by a group stage and double-elimination knockout stage twice per split. Asia, meanwhile, will be divided into Korea, Japan and Pacific subregions, with the best teams from these subregions qualifying for the OWCS Asia Championship for each split. The top teams from these regions will qualify for two international events, the OWCS Major in the spring for split 1 and the OWCS Season Finals in the fall for split 2.

== Other media ==
Overwatch was developed to lack a traditional story or campaign mode and instead Blizzard conveyed narrative elements through a transmedia storytelling method. While voice lines and map elements in Overwatch reveal some of its universe's lore, the bulk of the story surrounding its characters is told through animated short films and literary media. Character biographies and fake news reports containing story pieces have also been published on Blizzard's website. Chu remarked that Blizzard's method of storytelling with Overwatch demonstrated a "gameplay first" philosophy.

=== Animated projects ===
Overwatch characters as they appear in the Zero Hour cinematic trailer (2019)

As part of the original game's announcement, Blizzard released an animated "cinematic trailer" for Overwatch on November 7, 2014. They would repeat this to announce Overwatch 2, releasing the Zero Hour cinematic trailer in 2019.

Blizzard also released animated short films to help flesh out "the real meat" of Overwatch's lore. These shorts employed 3D computer-generated animation, and received praise from video game journalists, with some likening their quality to those of works from Disney and Pixar. (Note: Sources that share such an opinion include:) that Recall, the first of these shorts, was released on March 21, 2016. It was centered around Reaper's attack on Winston at Gibraltar and Winston's following recall of former Overwatch agents. Blizzard released nine more shorts through 2018; Reunion was the last of these shorts until The Wastelander was released in 2022.

Aside from short films, Blizzard also released "origin story" videos for Soldier: 76 and each character added to Overwatch's playable roster post-launch. An origin story for King's Row Uprising, a tie-in for an in-game event was also released. These origin story videos are designed to provide players with the background of new characters. Origin stories are animated in the style of motion comics and are shorter than Blizzard's 3D-animated short films.

An animated series based on Overwatch was in development after Netflix optioned the property from Blizzard in early 2020, but fell through later that year after Blizzard sued Netflix over the "poaching" of Blizzard's chief financial officer (CFO) Spencer Neumann.

=== Comics ===
From 2016 to 2018, Blizzard published Overwatch, a 16-issue comic series, beginning with "Trainhopper". Some issues, such as "Uprising", served as tie-ins to in-game events. Motion comic versions of the series were also released, produced by Madefire Studios. These motion comics included sound effects and official music featured in-game. Originally a digital comic series, Blizzard partnered with Dark Horse Comics to publish a hardcover anthology in 2017, which collected the series' 12 issues released to that point. An expanded edition of the anthology was released in December 2021.

From 2020 to 2021, Blizzard and Dark Horse published Tracer - London Calling a five-issue limited series. Written by Mariko Tamaki and illustrated by Babs Tarr, print versions of each issue were also released. Rachael Cohen and Deron Bennett served as the series' colorist and letterer, respectively. A graphic novel collecting the five issues and featuring cover art by artist Bengal was physically released on September 28, 2021.

Another five-issue limited series, New Blood was released from November 2021 to March 2022. Similar in style to London Calling, the series followed Cassidy post-Zero Hour on his journey to recruit members to the newly revived Overwatch. Both London Calling and New Blood also served as tie-ins for in-game seasonal events.

=== Other literary media ===
A graphic novel titled Overwatch: First Strike was teased by Blizzard in 2016, but it was ultimately scrapped. Posting on Overwatch's official forums, Chu stated that Blizzard decided to cancel First Strike due to considerable changes made to the narrative and characters of Overwatch since First Strike was first conceived. The novel was to be penned by writer Micky Neilson and artist Ludo Lullabi.

Shortly before the publishing of the first volume of their Overwatch comic series anthology, Dark Horse released The Art of Overwatch on October 24, 2017. The 100-page book showcased concept art and illustrations from Overwatch's development team, accompanied by their commentary.

In 2019, Blizzard released Bastet, What You Left Behind, and Valkyrie, three short stories which centered on Soldier: 76, Baptiste, and Mercy, respectively. Further short stories, Stone by Stone and Code of Violence, centering on Symmetra and Reaper, respectively, have also been released. Also in 2019, Blizzard released an official Overwatch cookbook. Shortly before the early access period for Overwatch 2, Blizzard Yōkai, which explored story elements regarding Kiriko. They later released Ramattra: Reflections and As You Are. The latter was released leading into the game's 2023 Pride event and established Pharah and Baptiste as LGBTQ+ characters.

On June 2, 2020, The Hero of Numbani, a young-adult novel by Nicky Drayden was published. The story, functioning as a loose novelization of Orisa's origin story, follows Efi Ofadele, an 11-year old inventor. Ofadele creates Orisa in order to help protect the fictional country of Numbani. A second Overwatch young-adult novel, this time authored by Lyndsay Ely, was released on June 1, 2021. The novel, titled Deadlock Rebels, centered on Cassidy and Ashe during their teenage years.

=== Merchandise ===
The popularity of Overwatch led various companies to launch merchandise lines featuring its characters. Funko produced several figurines as part of their "Pop!" line. Tracer is featured prominently in Good Smile Company's merchandise, with the company distributing both Nendoroid and Figma figurines of the character. Good Smile has also featured other Overwatch characters in their lines. Lego has also produced an Overwatch set of figurines. As part of their Rivals line, Nerf has designed Overwatch-stylized toy guns. Nerf's parent company, Hasbro, later launched a set of action figures featuring Overwatch characters.

=== Music ===
Since the franchise's beginning in 2016, the games have received six score album releases.

Discography

- Overwatch Soundtrack (2016)
- Synaesthesia auditiva (2018)
- Overwatch: Cities and Countries (2020)
- Overwatch: Animated Shorts (2021)
- Overwatch: Heroes and Villains (2022)
- Overwatch 2: Original Game Soundtrack (2023)

=== Crossovers ===
Tracer, Mercy, Genji, and D.Va were added as player skins for Fortnite in May 2026. On November 20, 2026, Kiriko and Widowmaker were added as additional skins available in the game’s shop. Widowmaker could have also been obtained through a tournament.

== Reception ==
Aggregate review scores As of March 7, 2025.
| Game | Metacritic |
|---|---|
| Overwatch | 91/100 (PC); 90/100 (PS4); 91/100 (XONE); 73/100 (Switch) |
| Overwatch 2 | 79/100 (PC); 76/100 (PS5); 78/100 (XSXS) |

The original Overwatch achieved widespread acclaim from both critics and players both prior to and upon release. Pre-release, media outlets "rushed to cover the [game's] beta", which attracted over 9.7 million players.

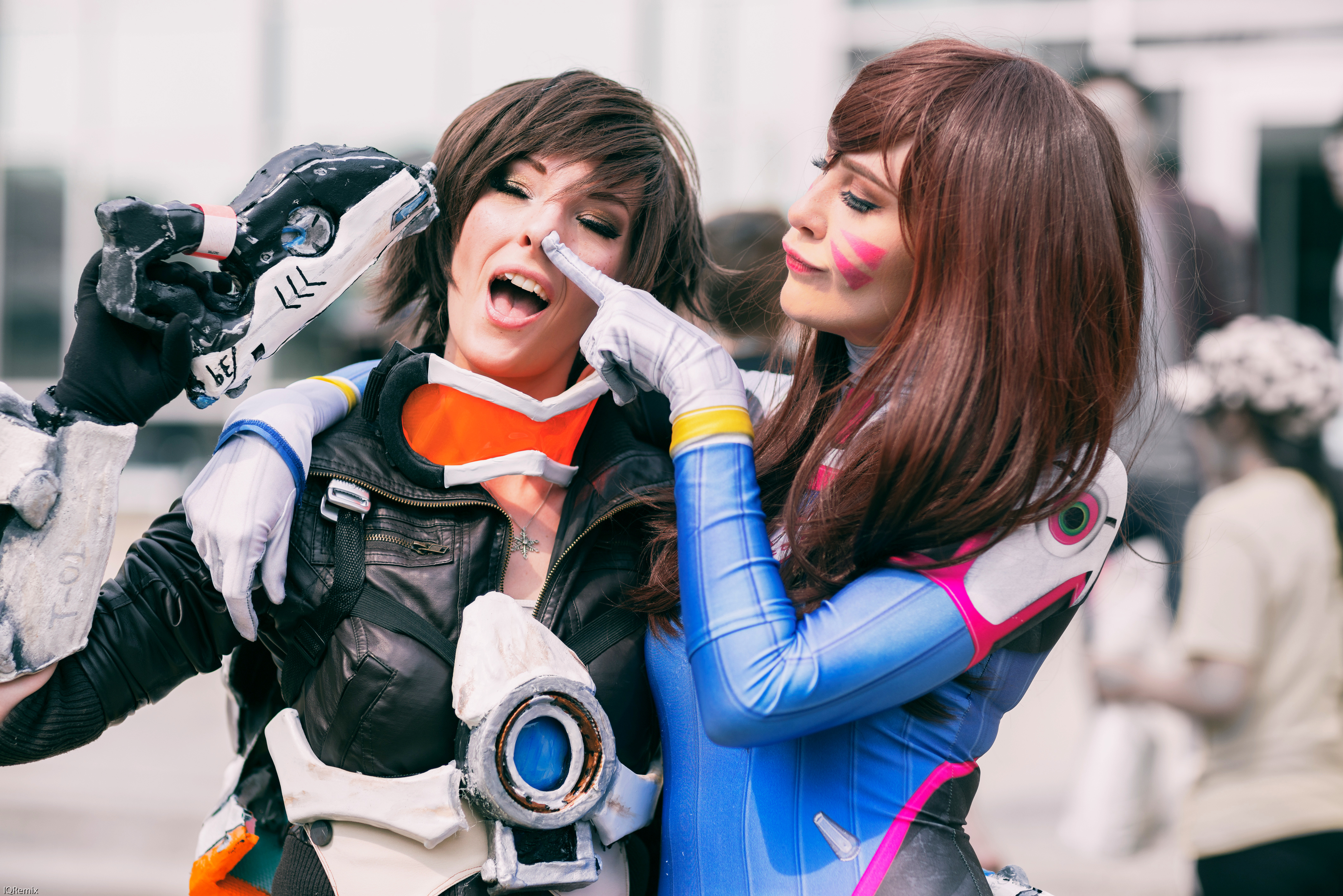
Cosplay of Tracer (left) and D.Va (right), often cited as among the best and most popular Overwatch characters both in-game and out (Note: Sources that share such an opinion include:)

The game's PC, PS4, and Xbox One versions all received "universal acclaim", according to review aggregator Metacritic; these versions all hold a "metascore" of 90/100 or higher on the aggregator. Overwatch's Nintendo Switch version, however, received "mixed or average reviews" with a 73/100 metascore on the aggregator. Since its release, Overwatch has been listed by various outlets as one of the best video games of all-time, particularly within its hero shooter genre and among 21st-century contemporaries. (Note: Sources or lists that share such an opinion include: IGN's "Top 100 Video Games of All Time": No. 51 (2018), No. 50 (2019), and No. 56 (2021); Polygon's "500 best games of all time": No. 198 (2017); The Guardian's "50 best video games of the 21st century": No. 41 (2019); VentureBeat (2016)) Voted on by readers, Overwatch also ranked 29th on a 2018 Game Informer poll regarding the best video games of all-time. Critics praised Overwatch for its friendly and inclusive multiplayer atmosphere, able to appeal to new and casual players, as well as more competitive and expert players. The game's colorful and vibrant world and characters, in addition to the playful and team-based nature of its gameplay were cited as driving forces behind the inclusivity and positivity of its player base. While this broad accessibility was a common account by reviewers upon release, outlets later noted that players grew more toxic, particularly on the game's competitive mode. Kaplan concurred with this assessment and led the developers' efforts to curb this toxicity.

The game also experienced considerable commercial success, becoming the 7th-best selling video game of all-time. Although never officially disclosing an exact number of sold copies, Blizzard counted a lifetime total of over 60 million players in 2021. In 2022, Bloomberg published a report stating that the game eventually sold over 50 million copies. Fans of the franchise produced a large amount of content including art, cosplay, fan fiction, anime-influenced music videos, Internet memes, and pornography featuring Overwatch characters and elements.

Overwatch's announcement trailer, released back in 2014, was bombastic and beautiful, and it kicked off a fervent fandom. Players loved the bright designs, strong characterization, and optimism inherent to the setting. The game's launch and follow-up cinematics only solidified this fan base; people loved to ship characters, imagine their missions, and daydream about future lore. Overwatch was so widespread and iconic it even revolutionized the Rule 34 scene; the game was everywhere.

— Cass Marshall, Polygon (2022)

Prior to Overwatch 2's release, fans raised concerns over the sequel's transition toward a 5v5 dynamic. Also predating its release, the sequel attracted both critic and player concerns about whether it would feel like a true sequel with considerable differences from its predecessor. Visuals from the sequel's technical beta were criticized for being too similar to the original game's. A perceived lack of attention toward support players was also noted during the game's beta. In response, Blizzard made efforts to make the support role more enticing to play. Shortly following the sequel's beta period and just weeks prior to the game launching into early access, Kiriko was introduced to the game's playable roster as the first support hero announced in over three years.

While the original game was positively received, elements of its related media garnered some criticism. Writing for Polygon in 2022, Cass Marshall wrote that "Overwatch's lore has been in stasis for so long, and its fandom has been so willing to make a meal out of the crumbs sprinkled out over the years, that I feel like the fans' version of the cast is more concrete than the actual canon." Natalie Clayton, writing for PC Gamer similarly opined that "Overwatch has only felt more stagnant as the years go on," as a result of the series' narrative being "almost uniformly backstories, developments happening safely in the past." Clayton added that "relationships never developed or changed. Characters never grew, and the state of the world-at-large was left a static unknown." Marshall cited this lack of significant progression in Overwatch lore, as well as Blizzard's inconsistent updates to it, particularly from 2018 to 2022, as a factor behind the game's declined in popularity. Valorant, Rainbow Six Siege, and Apex Legends were all cited as gaining favor among existing Overwatch players. Developments in Overwatch media also affected in-game player patterns; after Soldier: 76 was canonically revealed to be gay in a comic, his pick rate among players dropped dramatically. However, the pick rate returned to previous levels after around three months.

Overwatch 2 was met with positive reception from critics, albeit less so than its predecessor; the game's PC version holds a 79/100 metascore on review aggregator Metacritic. All versions indicate "generally favorable reviews. Some reviewers reaffirmed the game's questionable status as a true sequel, likening the game to more of a remix or update. Players had a more lukewarm reception to the sequel upon its launch, with criticism aimed at its battle pass feature and its formerly-required "SMS Protect" system. Changes made to online character bios following the launch of Overwatch 2 received criticism from fans.

On August 10, 2023, Overwatch 2 was released on Steam, garnering an "overwhelmingly negative" rating on Valve's platform which is the lowest rating any video game can get. IGN's Wesley Yin-Poole affirmed that "most of the negative reviews focus on one thing: monetization", detailing that Blizzard received considerable criticism from Overwatch's player base when Overwatch 2 launched in late 2022, due to it auto-updating its predecessor into a free-to-play sequel and "rendering the original Overwatch unplayable". Yin-Poole added that "the backlash revolves around Overwatch 2's free-to-play nature, with heroes in the battle pass, the battle pass itself, and Blizzard's new approach to cosmetics all highlighted as negative changes from the original Overwatch". Scholarship on Overwatch fandom has highlighted the wide range of corporate responses to fan-created content, noting that Blizzard has alternated between supportive and restrictive policies.
