= Skin (video games) =

Video game term

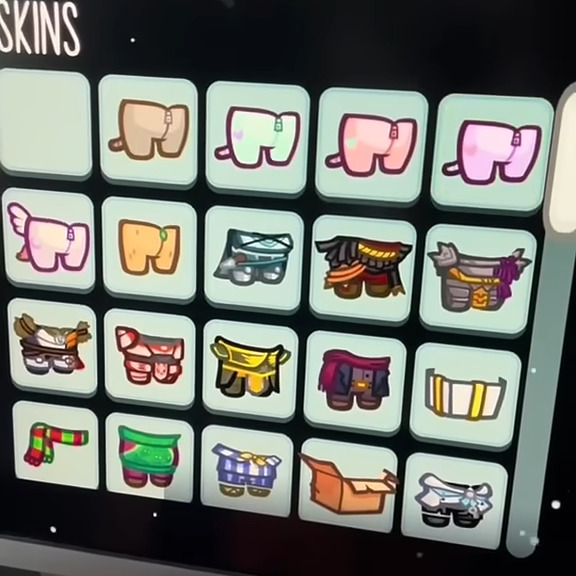
The video game Among Us allows the player to equip a variety of skins and accessories for their player character.

In video games, a skin is a cosmetic option for a character or in-game item. Sometimes unlockable, skins range from a simple recolor to a completely new costume or design.

Skins are sometimes distributed as part of downloadable content, and as pre-order incentives for newly-released games. In the 2010s, skins were increasingly deemed a virtual good as part of monetization strategies, especially within free-to-play games and those otherwise treated as a service. Via microtransactions commonly known as "loot boxes", a player can earn a random selection of in-game items, which may include skins and other cosmetic items of varying rarity. While often defended as being similar in practice to booster packs for collectible card games, researchers have deemed loot boxes to be "psychologically akin to gambling", and their inclusion in full-priced games have faced criticism from players for being an anti-consumer practice. They have largely been supplanted by "battle passes", which are collections of in-game challenges and goals that unlock reward tiers over a short- or long-term period. Via the Steam platform, Counter-Strike: Global Offensive and Team Fortress 2 also allow players to trade these items, which has led to communities devoted to bartering them for real-world money, as well as gambling.

Online games from East Asia, such as Tencent's Honor of Kings and NetEase's Justice, are especially famous for their commercialization and selling of skins, which more often than not changes not only a game character's audiovisual appearance but also its play feel. Being a cultural product, skins have also incurred serious political and cultural debates in China.

== Design ==
A set of alternate recolors for a single character in Slap City

A "skin" may refer to a range of things, from alternate character or weapon designs, to recolors. If two elements of a game are nearly or fully identical functionally, with differing appearances, one may be referred to as a "reskin" of the other, sometimes disparagingly if not made clear by developers. Often, skins are used to provide customization and personalization options to the player, to express themselves or to set themselves apart from other players. Recolors are a simple way of accomplishing this, which change the colors of an existing character, costume or item, leaving everything else unchanged. They are used often in the Super Smash Bros. series, such as in Super Smash Bros. Brawl. Some skins take the form of alternate designs altogether, in which the appearance of a character, costume or item will be greatly or completely changed, with the mechanics left unchanged. A later entry in the Super Smash Bros. series, Super Smash Bros. Ultimate, would still include recolors, but would also include alternate character costume options for some characters for greater customization.

To reward a skilled player for achieving difficult feats without giving any advantage in gameplay, skins may be implemented as unlockable rewards, especially in online games. An example of such an unlockable skin is the "Recon Armor" in Halo 3, which Inverse called "notorious" for the difficulty of its unlock requirement, acting as proof of the player's mastery. Some Call of Duty: Black Ops games have made a loose tradition of including a weapon skin in their multiplayer modes, called the dark matter camo, often awarded for completing all challenges from a large list per weapon available in the game. Unlockable skins to show mastery are not limited to online titles. The Auditore cape is a skin that alters the player's cape appearance in Assassin's Creed II, and is unlocked through collecting all 100 feathers in the game, a bonus reward for dedicated players.

Developers of live service games may design the unlock of certain skins to be time-sensitive. Overwatch and League of Legends have had several instances of such skins. For example, attendance or purchase of a virtual ticket to a given year's BlizzCon, a convention held by Overwatch developers Blizzard Entertainment, awarded a year-specific skin in the game. League of Legends has also had skins locked behind in-person events, along with a skin only awarded upon pre-order of the game, which was later made impossible. Fortnite skins are often offered through the item shop, which refreshes daily featuring new items while others are phased out. However, many skins are only available through this daily shop – some skins have gone almost 1,400 days before becoming available again.

Skins can sometimes take the form of historical incarnations of the player character (such as Insomniac Games' Spider-Man, which includes unlockable skins based on Spider-Man's past comic book and film appearances), as well as crossovers with other video games (such as Final Fantasy XIII-2 offering a costume based on Ezio Auditore from the Assassin's Creed franchise, and Super Smash Bros. Ultimate offering costume items based on other video game characters for its customizable Mii Fighter characters). Fortnite has similarly featured extensive uses of licensed properties as the basis for skins, also including non-gaming properties such as comic book characters, the National Football League, and musicians.

== History ==
One of the earliest examples of a skin, in the recolor sense, is in the 1983 arcade release Mario Bros., in which the second player can play as a green recolor of Mario, known as Luigi. This carried over to Super Mario Bros., albeit with a different color scheme. He also appeared in Super Mario Bros.: The Lost Levels, though he would receive a change in physics, with a higher jump but more slippery movement.

According to Polygon, skins via microtransaction were popularized by Bethesda Game Studios through the "Horse Armor Pack", downloadable content (DLC) for The Elder Scrolls IV: Oblivion. Joel Burgess, senior level designer at Bethesda, told Polygon the concept was formed when developers were still experimenting in 2005 with what DLC could include, and how to accurately value them. Taking inspiration from video game modding, they released the DLC to negative reception from fans due to its $2.50 price point, though it remained popular in sales, being "one of Bethesda's biggest DLC successes" according to Bethesda's executive producer Todd Howard.

Developer Valve Corporation introduced skins to Counter-Strike: Global Offensive in the 2013 Arms Deal update, adding over 100 weapon skins which could be bought by players and customised the appearance of weapons. The update also introduced the "Crate" system, the primary way of obtaining skins, in which players may spend money to obtain a skin at random. These skins could be sold for real money through Valve's official marketplace, and third-party websites allowed players to wager their skins to gamble for more or better skins, both of which have been the topic of controversy. In April 2018, the Belgian Gaming Commission ruled that the paid loot boxes in Counter-Strike: Global Offensive, Overwatch and FIFA18 were games of chance that violated Belgium's gambling law.

Also in 2013, Valve updated Dota 2, introducing the "compendium" microtransaction. Initially, it was an in-game companion app for The International, a Dota 2 esports world championship event, with some of the profits going towards the prize-pool for the event. Upon purchase, a skin would be awarded, with further cosmetics being awarded when certain prize-pool milestones were achieved. Valve returned this concept yearly through 2023, when they decided to discontinue it. Renamed to "battle pass" in 2016, the concept coincided with each International event, where Valve iterated on it by adding the ability to earn levels through playing the game in order to earn further rewards including skins. This began a wider trend of battle pass systems to award skins and other cosmetics, since implemented in games such as Fortnite's battle royale mode, Rocket League, and PUBG: Battlegrounds.

Skins also became a main source of revenue for free-to-play games. By mid-2018, Fortnite's free-to-play battle royale mode had earned more than $1 billion from in-game purchases across all platforms, including a wide range of character skins.

== Research ==
A study published in 2022 used League of Legends, a popular multiplayer online battle arena (MOBA) game, to measure subjective experience and objective performance changes as a product of customization via cosmetic microtransactions. It found that customization via skins did not have any impact on players' in-game performance, nor the players' perception of their performance. A significant increase in players' personal identification with the character they played as was observed. While this study and one published in 2010 found a positive correlation between identification and fun, the former did not observe a significant difference between the perceived fun with and without the use of skins.

Not only do players have several different motives for purchasing skins, as found in a study published in 2025, but different games see different distributions of motives. For example, players of Counter Strike: Global Offensive were more likely to purchase and use skins as a symbol of status, and for investment purposes, by virtue of the aforementioned skin marketplace. Meanwhile, League of Legends players had a higher tendency to purchase skins to support the development and maintenance of the game, to take advantage of sales, and for a sense of collection.
