= Feminine beauty ideal =

Socially constructed norms

The feminine beauty ideal is a specific set of beauty standards regarding traits that are ingrained in women throughout their lives and from a young age to increase their perceived physical attractiveness. It is experienced by many women in the world, though the traits change over time and vary in country and culture.

The prevailing beauty standard for women is heteronormative, but the extent to which it has influenced lesbian and bisexual women is debated. The feminine beauty ideal traits include but are not limited to: female body shape, facial feature, skin tones, clothing style, hairstyle and body weight.

Handling the pressure to conform to particular definition of "beautiful" can have psychological effects on an individual, such as depression, eating disorders, body dysmorphia and low self-esteem that can start from an adolescent age and continue into adulthood.

== Cultural ideals ==
=== Body modification ===
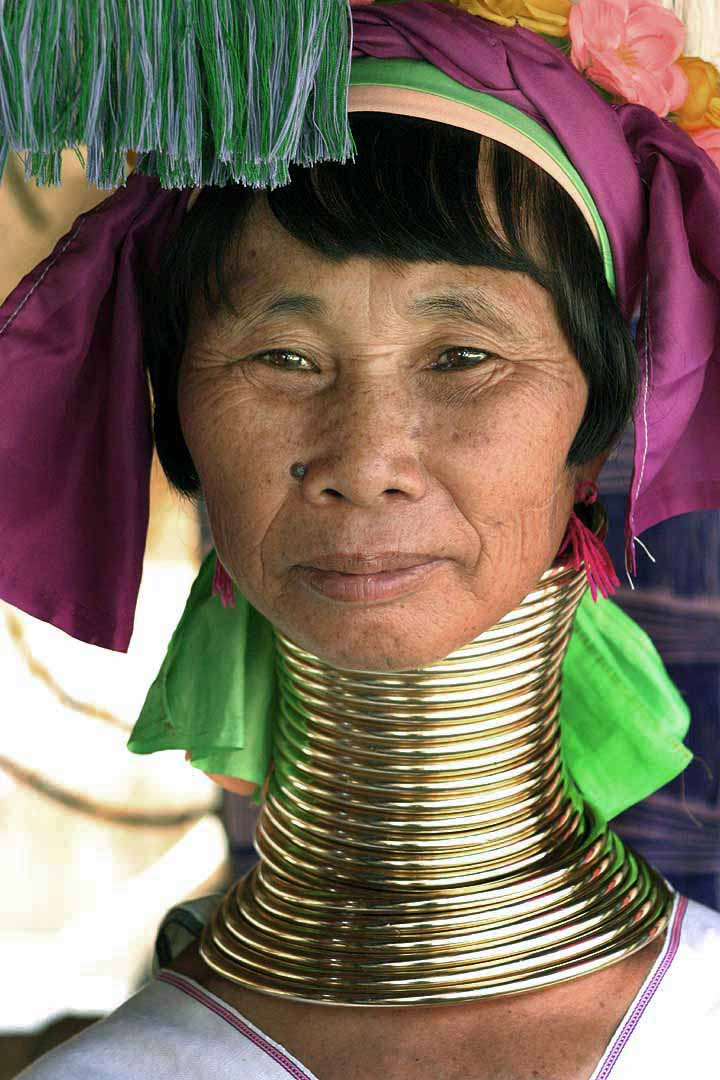
Kayan woman with neck rings

The idea of what is considered the ideal of beauty for women varies across different cultural ideals and practices. In Myanmar, Kayan Lahwi girls from the age of about five years have metal rings put around their necks. Additional rings are added to the girl's neck every two years. This practice gradually deforms the clavicles and placement of the ribs through the weight of the rings to create the illusion of a longer neck. These women eventually carry up to 24 rings around their necks. The older generation seems comfortable and proud of their beauty by wearing rings as tourism booms in eastern Myanmar, but younger women and parents of young girls face a choice between observing an ancient cultural tradition or being able to fit in better if they pursue education or employment outside of their community.

In China, the practice of foot binding involved a girl's feet being bound at age six to create the "ideal" image of feet. The girl's feet were bound to become 1/3 of the original size, which crippled the woman, but also gave her a very high social status and was much admired. After the revolution of 1911, the practice of foot binding was ended.

== Skin and hair color ==
=== Skin color contrast and cosmetics ===
Skin color contrast has been identified as a feminine beauty standard observed across multiple cultures. Women tend to have darker eyes and lips than men, especially relative to the rest of their facial features, and this attribute has been associated with female attractiveness and femininity, yet it also decreases male attractiveness, according to one study. Women may use cosmetics such as lipstick and eye shadow to increase their facial color contrast or to increase the apparent distance between their eyes and eyebrows. A 2009 study found that East Asian people had more facial skin contrast than white people, owing to their consistently darker eyes.

=== Hair color ===
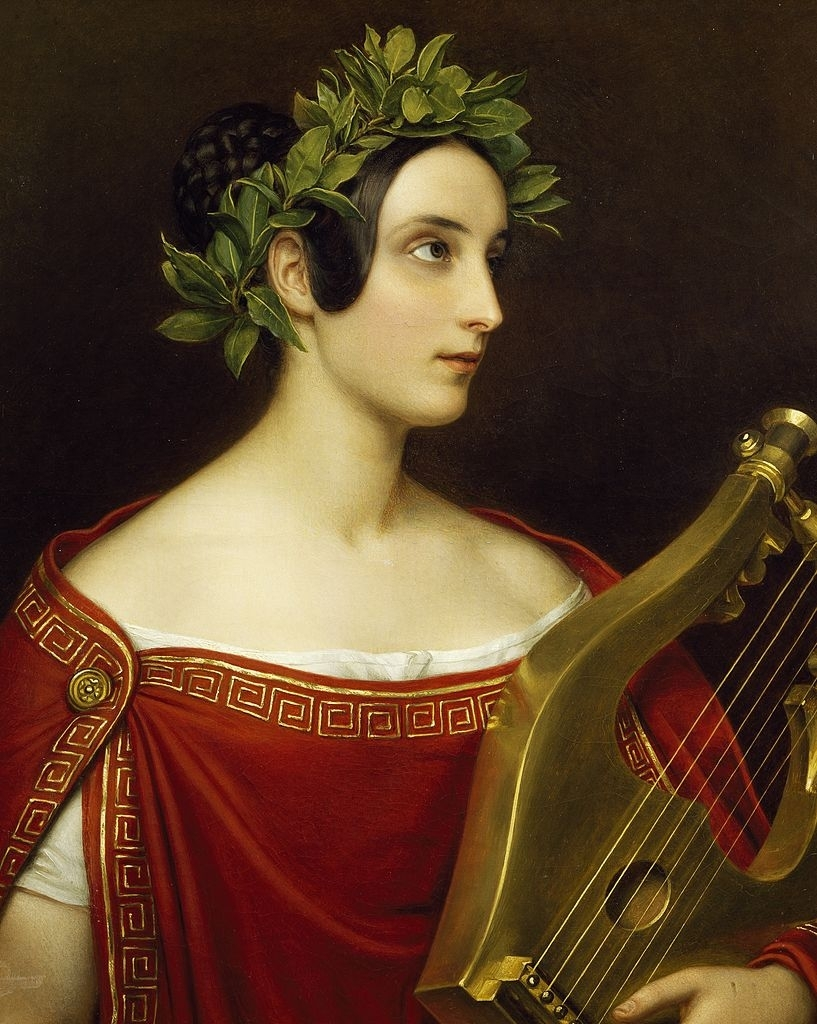
Lady Theresa Spence as Sappho, painted in 1837 for the Gallery of Beauties

A 2008 study sought to find whether blond hair or dark hair was the feminine beauty ideal in the Western world. The authors found that dark hair, rather than blond hair, was the feminine ideal. Women with dark hair were over-represented in Western fashion and pop-culture media, which may explain the finding that men in England generally rated dark-haired women as more attractive than women with blond hair. A 2018 study conducted in Florida produced similar results. In East Asia, women with black hair are presented as the beauty ideal, while blonde women are denied the ideal status. Blonde Swedish women have reported low self-esteem while living in Singapore, as local beauty standards have reduced their sense of femininity. Japanese advertisements have occasionally depicted blonde women as envious of black-haired women.

=== Skin color standards ===
The practice of skin whitening is common amongst women in the Middle East, South Asia, and Africa, while sun tanning, indoor tanning and self tanning is common among white women in the Western world. In the 21st century, the popularity of tanning has substantially increased among young women in the United States, Australia and China, despite professional advice to avoid tanning due to the risk of skin cancer and photoaging. In the 2020s, there has been a 175% increase in self-tanning among Gen Z African Americans.

The colonization of non-white countries by European migrants sometimes led to the establishment of inter-racial beauty ideals, such as in Dutch Indonesia, where white Dutch male colonists defined beauty standards that ranked Southeast Asian women as more attractive than white women, based on their darker skin and black hair. Some studies using Caucasian male subjects from Western countries have identified a preference for women with darker skin, which indicates that there is no innate preference for lighter skin within the Western world. Thus, there is a preference for tan-skinned women that is largely specific to Western culture. Some studies from Western countries have found that, among young women, those with a more tanned skin color have higher self-perceived attractiveness.

== Regional standards ==
=== Southeast Asian women ===
In the Dutch East Indies, now Indonesia, the feminine beauty ideal created by white male colonists was for women to have a brown skin color with black hair. In the 1920s, an American consul wrote a letter to the United States Secretary of State in which he observed that white European Dutch men in colonial Indonesia preferred to marry local women of color over white Dutch women, primarily because the brown skin and black hair of Indonesian women was perceived to be more beautiful than the pale and fair-haired complexions of white Dutch women. The frequency at which young Dutch men married Indo women was considered an embarrassment for the conservative element of Dutch society. The legacy of this interracial beauty ideal continues to be reflected in local literature, as it was written in a popular novel that "a golden colored skin is the greatest gift Allah can bestow upon a woman".

Swedish women have reported low self-esteem while living in Singapore, as local beauty standards have reduced their sense of femininity.

=== East Asian women ===
==== China ====
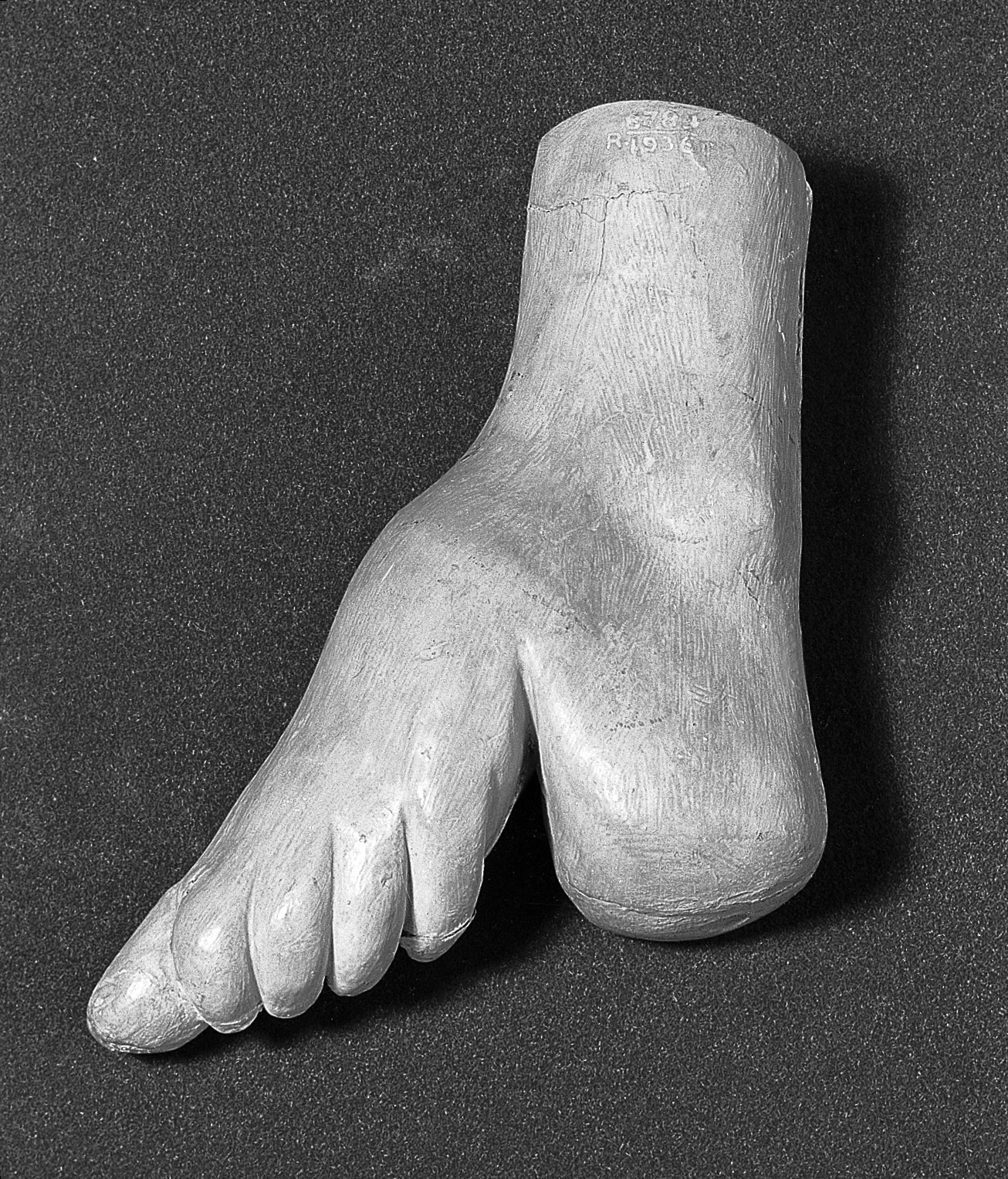
Cast of women's foot deformed by foot binding

In ancient China, pale skin was seen as a prerequisite for beauty for both men and women, and it was also a marker of one's place in the social class system. However, according to recent research, tan-colored skin has emerged as the new feminine beauty ideal, with many Chinese women now viewing their tanned skin as healthier and more attractive. According to Tai Wei Lim, Chinese women in media now sport bronze complexions, and this is viewed as a reclamation of women's autonomy from the declining Chinese patriarchy.

Historically, Tang dynasty women with a plump figure were considered the standardized view of beauty, contrasting with the expectations of the tall, slim figures of today.

Starting from Song elites and eventually popularized and ended in the Qing dynasty, foot binding was seen as an idolized representation of women's petite beauty, and the practice was referred to as "三寸金莲", 'three-inch golden lotus'.

In Chinese literature and poetry, Chinese beauties were almost always of noble or middle-class status, and depictions often portrayed them as court ladies or servants of court ladies, wearing immaculate clothing. This implies that beauty in ancient China was not only a matter of physical appearance but also of social status and wealth.

==== Japan ====
Though sharing some aspects of Confucian culture with China, beauty standards between China and Japan have differed historically. Dating back to the Heian period (794–1185), Japanese court ladies would colour their teeth black (a practice known as ohaguro) upon reaching adulthood. This custom was practiced by the nobility; samurai clans could be seen at a large number of temples, but were not generally seen among commoners. The practice of teeth blackening lasted until the Meiji Restoration of 1868.

Hairdressing and apparel were of supreme importance in the Heian period; eyebrows were plucked and replaced with darker, wider ones that were painted higher on the forehead, a practice known as hikimayu. Hair had to be at least long enough to touch the ground when seated. The use of pale makeup known as oshiroi was common, which emphasized the colour combinations of Heian-period clothing – jūnihitoe for women and suikan for men – which were chosen for their seasonality and symbolism.

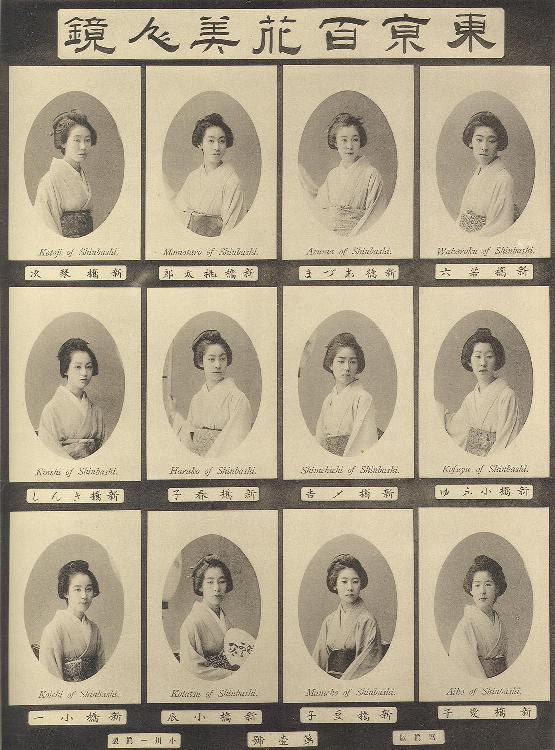
Celebrated Geysha of Tokyo (published by Ogawa Kazumasa in Kanda-ward, Tokyo, Japan, 25 June 1895)

Japanese scholar and art critic Okakura Kakuzō stated in his compilations of lectures in 1905 that the considerable bases of beauty for modern Japan is:

...to make a beautiful women, She is to possess a body not much exceeding five feet in height, with comparatively fair skin and proportionally well-developed limbs; a head covered with long, thick, and jet-black hair; an oval face with a straight nose, high and narrow; rather large eyes, with large deep-brown pupils and thick eyelashes, a small mouth, hiding behind its red, but not thin lips, even rows of small white teeth; ears not altogether small; and long thick eyebrows forming two horizontal but slightly curved lines, with a space left between them and the eyes...a very high as well as a very low forehead being considered not attractive.

Research suggests that Japanese beauty ideals may be affected more by individuality than Korean or Chinese culture. Japanese people are more likely to incorporate anti-aesthetics, incompleteness, uncertainty, pluralism, and deconstruction of what is considered to be 'beautiful', which is against the normal Japanese beauty standard, which was based on aesthetics. This is allowing Japanese women to embrace their 'flaws' that society used to turn against them and to instead use their features and embrace the uniqueness of one's moles, birthmarks, eye shape, teeth shape and various facial elements. Japanese advertisements have occasionally depicted white women as envious of black-haired women. In the late 20th century, the emergence of the ganguro and gyaru sub-cultures was considered an act of rebellion against the Japanese feminine beauty ideal. These trends were characterized by spray tans, dyed blonde or orange hair color, and brightly colored contact lenses. Women who adopted these fashion trends faced extreme social pressures from family members and punishment from school authorities, leading some to drop out of school and enter the labor force at a young age.

==== South Korea ====
The traditional female beauty ideal in Korea is for a woman to have a wide, large, moon-like face, with narrow eyes, and full, red lips. These are seen as the attributes of female fertility and motherhood, within Korea. More recently, as Korean women's wealth and social empowerment have improved, they have increasingly sought cosmetic surgery to produce the opposite look: a narrower face and wider eyes. According to Debra Gimlin, this trend suggests that Korean women are resisting the traditional ideal aesthetic, by distancing themselves from the "maternal body".

As of 2018, South Korea has the highest rate of cosmetic surgery per capita. Between 1990 and 2006, the number of surgeries specializing in plastic surgery in South Korea grew to the total rate of 8.9 percent per year, where the majority fraction undergoing these procedures were young people. A survey in 2004 showed that out of 1,565 female students attending college, 25.4 percent of them had undergone plastic surgery for double eyelids, 3.6 percent for the nose, and 1 percent for jaw/cheekbone. Polling from 2015 in South Korea indicates that as many as 30% of young women age 19-29 may have undergone plastic surgery in South Korea. Due to the rise of idol culture, beauty aesthetics in South Korea have undergone drastic changes, where women associate beauty with professional success. In workplaces, women are expected to be physically attractive; headshots are required when submitting resumes to some companies, and the appearance of female applicants is often scrutinized, with both professional skill and physical beauty idealized.

In addition to idol culture, researchers have found that due to South Korea's hypercompetitive society, Korean women have gradually come to believe that they could achieve more from superior beauty even though they may have a limited amount of social resources. In one study, it was found that Korean women associated beauty with having an easier time searching for jobs, finding spouses and higher income levels. There is also a concept called the halo effect in Korea, where being beautiful and being smart leads to the ultimate level of beauty. If a woman is considered to be smart, by attending a prestigious university like Seoul National University, and up to South Korea's strict beautiful standards, she is considered to be "untouchable" and "no one can beat her".

The latest 'activist'-like movement that young girls in South Korea are promoting is called the "pro-ana" movement. Young girls will go onto various websites and social media outlets to promote behaviours related to the eating disorder anorexia, such as how to throw away lunch at school without getting in trouble with the staff members and how to not get caught by parents. The majority of the girls who are involved in this movement are not eating properly and are starving themselves until their weight drops to a fragile amount of 30 to 40 kilograms. Individuals who are extremists about losing weight will take vast amounts of constipation pills to flush food out of their system quickly, as the lack of nutrition will cause them to lose weight drastically. On rare occasions where the girls eat proper meals, they feel guilty for indulging, leading them to turn to bulimic tendencies and force themselves to vomit to maintain their thin shape.

In South Korea, psychotropic appetite suppressants also increased in popularity by 31.5 percent from 93.2 billion won (US$77.4 million) in 2014 to 122.5 billion won (US$102.8 million) in 2018, while the sales in non-psychotropic appetite suppressants increased 126.8 percent from 34.9 billion won (US$29.3 million) to 79.1 billion won (US$66 million) during the same time. The long-term use of psychotropic appetite suppressants increases the risk of side effects such as pulmonary hypertension and severe heart disease. This, in combination with the lack of nutrients that girls receive due to anorexic tendencies, can cause malnutrition, osteoporosis, heart disease and hair loss. Taking into account that it is more harmful to teenagers as their brains and bodies are still developing, their extreme dieting happens can lead to irregular menstruation, loss of menstruation, stunted growth, and in extreme cases, death.

Girls who are active in the pro-ana movement are often not unaware of the risk of anorexia. They are aware that anorexia is a disorder, but they believe their actions are justified due to their culture which harshly criticizes the perceived beauty of individuals based on their body shape.

=== South Asia ===
The idea of beauty standards in South Asia has had a long history with fair skin tone. The normative societal expectation of beauty of people has been associated with the gradient of their skin colour. The fairer one becomes, the more attractive they are. Fairness is also a tool of belongingness and social acceptance within the dominant society. Whiteness is the most ideal beauty standard of coloured women in South Asia.

In India, 'fairer' skin is viewed as a beauty aesthetic ideal disproportionately targeted at women. The skin colour of many young women is perceived as an obstacle to social mobility. The preference for lighter skin tones has been perpetrated by exposure to idealized images conveyed in visual media, as well as through discriminatory practices that favour lighter skin tones.

In North India, where there is increasing importation of brides from the darker-skinned regions Southern India, families face insecurities around the fact that they have a darker-skinned daughter compared to themselves. Many regions in South Asia still believe in the practices of arranged marriage and women who are dark-skinned face higher rejection. In terms of marriage, choices, and life outcomes, fair-skinned women are in a better position than those with darker complexions, since lighter skin is traded for a less expensive dowry.

==== Advertisements ====
Models often set a standard of beauty for audiences by endorsing various products and displaying perfect portions of their bodies. Hyper-commercialized facial products like Fair and Handsome and Fair and Lovely were in trend in the South Asian society until very recently. For women, products like Glow & Lovely were not only a marker of social acceptance but also an emotional strength, making them 'happy and confident'. Multi-billion-dollar skin lightening products have grown throughout the world in part because of colourism, as millions of people of colour, most of whom are women, purchase and use products intended to permanently lighten their skin. Skin whitening products are also known as skin bleaching products and come in creams, gels, and lotions that are directly applied to the skin. The factors motivating the use of skin lightening products are rejection and pressure from primary parents and a belief that lighter skin influences attractiveness, marriageability, social status, self-esteem, or respect received from others. According to estimates, the market size for 'fairness' creams and lotions in India is about US$450 million. A growth rate of 15 to 20% is reported each year for 'fairness' products.

The preference for fair skin has similarity made fair skin a desirable quality for South Asian men. For instance, skin whitening products have been established as a marker of masculinity and deemed as a desirable beauty standard for men in West Nepal.

=== Europe ===
==== France ====
There have been multiple beauty ideals for women in France. The 16th-century memoirist Brântome lists as many as thirty things are needed to make a woman beautiful, a common but rigid ideal might include Brântome's "three white things". These "things" or traits refer to skin, teeth, and hands. There are also the "three black things", including the color of the person's eyes, eyebrows and eyelashes. This leaves three other areas to embark on, including the cheeks, lips, and nails. This beauty standard also was noted to pull from "sections on alchemy, medicine, astrology, cooking and the art of looking beautiful".

Auguste Debay (1802–1890) in his book "Physiologie descriptive des trente beautés de la femme" (1858) said: "The beauty of Helen of Troy, which had such a great impact in antiquity, served as a basis for Zeuxis to establish the qualities, proportions and relationships which constitute perfect beauty, according to art. The portrait he made of this famous princess, brought together, according to Scaliger, the following thirty beauties..."

According to Wandering Pioneer, beauty standards in France seem to concern someone's style rather than the body shape. In addition, the French approach to beauty is about enhancing natural features rather than achieving a specific look. According to some dermatologists, looking young is not a beauty criterion. Instead, women want to look toned and their skin to look firm.

=== Global ===
==== Black women in Africa and North America ====
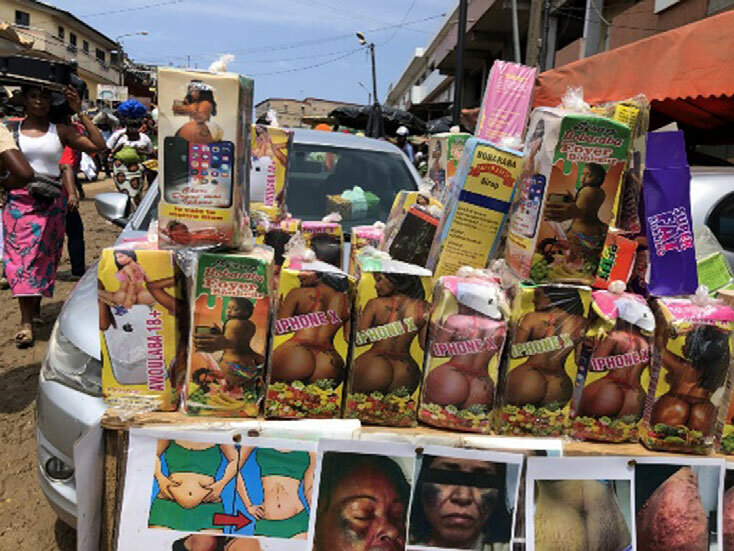
Market stand in Abidjan, Ivory Coast selling buttocks-enlargement syrups for women

While most studies on appearance ideals tend to emphasize the importance of a slender and lean body, studies that focus on Black women suggest that a more curvaceous or hourglass-shaped body ideal may be more salient for Black women than the mainstream thin ideal.

Studies conducted in the United States have found that Black women generally have a greater tolerance for heavier body sizes compared to White and Asian women, and additional studies found that Black women generally perceive larger curvy body ideals, as well as larger buttocks and thick thighs, as more desirable compared to White women. The curvier body ideal also exists among Black Caribbean women.

The internalization of this curvaceous body ideal has been suggested as being a possible factor in the overweight and obesity epidemic among African-American women, as they are the demographic in the United States with the highest rates of being overweight or obese, and they additionally often underestimate the weight and size of their own bodies.

Overweight and obesity are also highly prevalent among Black female populations living in Europe, including the United Kingdom, where Black Caribbean and Black African women have higher obesity rates compared to the general British population, which has also been attributed to a greater cultural tolerance for heavier bodies. Black South African women similarly have higher obesity rates than other demographics in South Africa, which has similarly been attributed to Black South African women idealizing heavier body sizes consisting of larger buttocks and hips.

In addition to overweight and obesity, other health concerns from this idealized body image include the use of products such as Apetamin, an unapproved appetite stimulant with dangerous health risks that has gained popularity among Black women in the United Kingdom and the United States who seek to attain the curvier body ideal.

Sarah Baartman was a 19th-century Khoikhoi woman from South Africa who gained notoriety for the large size of her buttocks caused by a genetic condition known as steatopygia, which is prevalent among Khoikhoi women. Her large buttocks were exoticized and treated as a spectacle in Europe where she was displayed in freak show attractions, and she both aroused and repelled White society. Although White society viewed such women as "savage" and "wild", there was also an enchantment and sense of eroticization of this body type. White women of that era adopted the bustle dress, which created the appearance of larger buttocks, leading to some scholars to make comparisons with the buttocks of Baartman, and suggest that the bustle was influenced by her physique.

Black women undergoing cosmetic surgery generally request larger and fuller buttocks and thighs compared to other women seeking buttock augmentation, and they often desire maximum fullness of the buttocks as well as an extreme prominence of the upper buttocks.

Since the 2010s, non-Black women have increasingly requested buttocks implants to fulfil this beauty ideal, with the number of procedures in the United States nearly doubling from 2014 and 2015. The "Brazilian butt lift" surgery also gained popularity, with the American Society of Plastic Surgeons estimating that the number of procedures increased by 38 percent between 2017 and 2019.

Non-Black celebrities such as Kim Kardashian have achieved recognition for their large buttocks and curves. Some Black feminists such as Yomi Adegoke view this beauty trend as cultural appropriation of Black feminine beauty. Yomi Adegoke argues that this trend seeks to imitate the curvier body ideal of Black women, who have faced negative stigma rather than receiving similar praise for possessing the same bodies. Some Black women have additionally found Sarah Baartman's story as a source of inspiration and empowerment to celebrate curvier bodies, seeing parallels between her life and the modern cultural appropriation and societal treatment of curvy Black female bodies.

As racial minorities in the United States, African Americans were historically pressured by white beauty ideals that conflict with their own natural features and beauty ideals. Paradoxically, Makkar and Strube observe that modern-day black women view themselves more favorably than white women, and are less likely than them to pursue the conventional beauty ideal. They interviewed black women with both low and high self esteem, and found that both groups rated themselves as more attractive than white supermodels, but less attractive than black supermodels. However, women with stronger black identity perceived themselves as substantially more attractive. The authors found that black women who have a stronger sense of black identity were less likely to be impacted by external beauty ideals than black women with a weaker sense of black identity, which suggests an explicit rejection of white beauty standards.

Colourism can be defined as discrimination towards people within the same racial or ethnic group or community based on the shade of one's skin colour. Colourism can also affect Latin Americans, East Asians, South Asians, and Europeans, leading to complexion discrimination.

Colourism in the United States dates back to during slavery, where lighter-skinned men or women were required to work indoors, while the darker-skinned individuals were to work out on the fields. The shade of their skin colour determined their job as well as the treatment they were to receive.

In the documentary film Dark Girls, interviews with black women illustrate the topic of colourism. Experiences and experiments mentioned in the film conclude how women of darker skin suffered socially, mentally, and personally. Some of the women in the film mention how they did not see themselves as beautiful because of their darker skin.

In Flash of the Spirit, Robert Farris Thompson discusses the ancient beauty ideals for African women. The ideals were there were no ideals. Beauty was rarely accepted if you were "too perfect" or "overly handsome". Being "too much" of something was a red flag because it threw off the spectrum according to Yoruba society. It was called "iwontunwonsi". This is the opposite of what the standards for society are today because they set a middle ground to compare people to, yet the middle ground consists of high standards.

According to Laura Engel, Black women (but not other women of colour), have been whitewashed. Whitewashing of black women is not only limited to whitening black individuals' skin tones, but also giving them straight hair textures and Eurocentric features. Magazines and beauty companies have been criticized for whitewashing the images of black female celebrities on covers and advertisements, mostly photoshopping them with lighter skin.

According to a 2020 study, black women who were online beauty content creators had lower salaries, fewer brand endorsements, more difficulty receiving sponsorships, and a significantly slower rise to popularity compared to non-Black online beauty content creators. Resesrchers were unable to determine why this was the case, as their study provided no information on causality and the sample size consisted of just nine women.

The research of Marway has additionally found that the beauty norm for fair skin limits career goals and opportunities for black women and women of colour, as they practice self-censorship when applying for jobs because they have an expectation that they will not be chosen to play lead roles in a workplace due to the disproportionate racial presence in various professions.

== Body and facial hair ==
Body hair and facial hair have long been stigmatized in women across multiple cultures regarding them as masculine attributes that are undesirable to the opposite sex. For this reason, many women feel pressured to remove the body hair from their legs and arms, while those who do not are often scrutinized. The same standard does not exist for men, and although male body grooming has existed since the early 20th century, it has never achieved popularity in the Western world.

== Mass media ==
Mass media is one of the most powerful tools for young girls and women to learn and also understand feminine beauty ideals. As mass media develops, the way people see feminine beauty ideals changes, as does how females view themselves. "The average teen girl gets about 180 minutes of media exposure daily and only about 10 minutes of parental interaction a day," says Renee Hobbs, EdD, associate professor of communications at Temple University. In most advertisements, female models are typically homogeneous in appearance. "Girls today are swamped by [ultra-thin] ideals not only in the form of dolls but also in comics, cartoons, TV, and advertising along with all the associated merchandising." In addition to this, the feminine beauty ideal in the mass media is manipulated by technology. Images of women can be virtually manipulated creating an ideal that is not only rare but also nonexistent. The Encyclopedia of Gender in the Media states that "the postproduction techniques of airbrushing and computer-generated modifications 'perfect' the beauty myth by removing any remaining blemishes or imperfections visible to the eye." Advertisements for products "such as diets, cosmetics, and exercise gear [help] the media construct a dream world of hopes and high standards that incorporates the glorification of slenderness and weight loss."

With a focus on an ideal physical appearance, the feminine beauty ideal distracts from female competency by prioritizing and valuing superficial characteristics related to beauty and appearance. When physical beauty is idealized and featured in the media, it reduces women to sexualized objects. This creates the message across mass media that one's body is inadequate apart from sex appeal and connects concepts of beauty and sex.

Celebrities achieve perfection through photoshopped images that hide every blemish or flaw while also editing body parts to create the ideal hourglass body type. The Dove Beauty and Confidence Report interviewed 10,500 females across thirteen countries and found that women's confidence in their body image is steadily declining – regardless of age or geographic location. Despite these findings, there is a strong desire to fight existing beauty ideals. In fact, 71% of women and 67% of girls want the media to do a better job of portraying different types of women. Studies done by Dove reveal low self-esteem impacts women and girls' ability to release their true potential. 85% of women and 79% of girls admit they opt out of important life activities when they do not feel confident in the way they look. More than half of women (69%) and girls (65%) allude to pressure from the media and advertisements to become the world's version of beautiful, which is a driving force of appearance anxiety. Studies done by Dove have also revealed the following statistics: "4% of women consider themselves beautiful, 11% of girls globally are comfortable with describing themselves as beautiful, 72% of girls feel pressure to be beautiful, 80% of women agree that every woman has something about her that is beautiful, but do not see their own beauty, and that 54% of women agree that when it comes to how they look, they are their own worst beauty critic." Through the rise of Ozempic, weight loss is becoming a top pirority for people as of todays day and age.

The modern idea of the hourglass figure in a study has shown that it may contribute to causing underlying health issues. In an article published by the Cleveland Clinic titled "Hourglass Syndrome: Why You Should Stop Sucking In Your Stomach" it discusses the side effects of trying to achieve the hourglass shape that is portrayed in the media. The act of sucking in the stomach can lead to potential health problems such as breathing issues, neck and back pain, and pelvic floor problems. The Cleveland Clinic's study mentioned a reduction in oxygen intake by at least 30% and a damaged pelvic floor due to the act of sucking in the stomach. These are some potential health concerns linked to efforts to achieve the hourglass figure.

Online platforms that focus on interactions through image-sharing and visual content, such as Instagram, tend to emphasize physical appearance and aesthetics. According to evidence gathered from a study focusing on general Instagram use in young women, researchers suggest Instagram usage was positively correlated with women's self-objectification. This same study also considered the effect of Instagram on the internalization of the Western beauty ideal for women, and the evidence gathered in the study agrees with the idea that Instagram use encourages women to internalize the societal beauty ideal of Western culture. Because users have the opportunity to shape and edit their photographs before sharing them, they can force them to adhere to the beauty ideal. Viewing these carefully selected pictures shows the extent to which women internalize the Western beauty ideal. In addition to researching the effects of general Instagram use, the study also researched the effects of "fitspiration" Instagram pages on young women's body image. "Fitspiration" pages aim to motivate the viewer through images of healthy eating and exercising. Although these pages aim to be a positive way to promote a healthy lifestyle, they are also appearance-based and contain images of toned and skinny women. According to the study, there is a positive correlation to young women's viewing "fitspiration" pages and a negative body image.

A case study conducted about Instagram use and the Western feminine beauty ideal focused on the specific account @effyourbeautystandards, a body-positive Instagram page created by feminist plus-size model Tess Holliday. Through her page, Holliday instructed women to share pictures of themselves on Instagram with the hashtag #effyourbeautystandards. Images posted with this hashtag would be selected by the account administrators and posted to the @effyourbeauutystandards page. The evidence gathered in this case study suggested that while these selected pictures attempt to take an intersectional approach to the content women view on social media, they may still have an effect on how women view their bodies.

Social media platforms such as Snapchat, Instagram, and TikTok may promote unrealistic beauty standards for women and teenage girls for various reasons. A large part of this may be due to the use of photoshop and heavy filters that change one's facial structure and features. When there is such a large influx of content catered to achieving a certain beauty standard it can leave many feel dissatisfied with their own.

Selfies are standard among social media platforms, but they can negatively effect someone's self esteem. A study published by Jennifer Mills- a professor at York University in Toronto found that in general, women felt more self conscious after taking a selfie than they did prior. She had two groups that were instructed to take a selfie and post it online; one was only allowed to take one selfie while the other was able to take unlimited and edit them. Both groups were left with the same result despite the differing circumstances. There was always a factor they felt dissatisfied with whether it was the lighting, how their face looked, the angle, etc. Another factor was validation from others whether it was approving the selfie or looking at likes and comments.

== Fairy tales ==
The feminine beauty ideal is portrayed in many children's fairy tales. It has been common in the Brothers Grimm fairy tales for physical attractiveness in female characters to be rewarded. In those fairy tales, "beauty is often associated with being white, economically privileged, and virtuous", according to Lori Baker-Sperry and Liz Grauerholz.

The Brothers Grimm fairy tales usually involve a beautiful heroine. In the story Snow White, the protagonist Snow White is described as having "skin as white as snow, lips as red as blood, and hair as black as ebony wood" and as being "beautiful as the light of day." By contrast, the antagonist of Brothers Grimm fairy tales is frequently described as old and physically unattractive, relating beauty with youth and goodness, and ugliness with aging and evil. Ultimately, this correlation puts an emphasis on the virtue of being beautiful, as defined by Grimm fairy tales.

Almost 100 years after the Grimm Brothers wrote their fairy tales, Walt Disney Animation Studios adapted these tales into animated feature films. Other common traits of female Disney characters include thin bodies with impossible bodily proportions, long, flowing hair, and large, round eyes. Disney animated princess films associate beauty with the good qualities in a character. By consistently associating beauty with goodness and virtue, while simultaneously linking unattractiveness to evil or moral corruption, these stories reinforce the idea that a woman's value is connected to her physical appearance. A 2019 study suggests that Disney heroines have extremely small waists that are nearly impossible to achieve naturally.

== Fashion and beauty-centred dolls ==
When young girls are playing with fashion and beauty-centred dolls, they begin to idealize beauty standards and associate what they find "beautiful" in the doll with attributes that they feel that they need to uphold. Girls who played with thin Barbie dolls reported lower body image and a greater desire to be thinner than the girls who played with a curvier doll or no doll at all.

When taking Barbie's "beautiful" proportions and translating that physique into an actual human, Barbie is estimated to be 5 ft 9 in (175 cm) tall, have a 39 in bust, an 18 in waist, 33 in hips, children's size 3 feet, and her weight would be 110 pounds (50 kg). Taking into consideration Barbie's 'human' height and weight, Barbie would have a Body Mass Index (BMI) of 16.24; this number fits the weight criteria for anorexia. Additionally, being below a BMI of 17 suggests that an individual cannot afford to lose more weight as it is detrimental to one's health and that they are severely underweight. Continuously playing with fashion and beauty-centred dolls with such idealistic body proportions can cause psychological effects to an individual and can later stem into the development of eating disorders and other negative mental health outcomes such as depression and anxiety. They may also cause young girls to associate thinness with attractiveness, success, and happiness. Another study suggests that girls continue to internalize the thin ideal even after playing with more realistic dolls.

Although Barbie has historically been the most prominent example, other popular doll lines have also influenced perceptions of beauty and identity. Bratz dolls, introduced in 2001, were celebrated for their multicultural characters and distinctive fashion, but they have also been criticized for emphasizing heavy makeup, exaggerated lips, and stylized clothing that some argue sexualizes young girls. Monster High dolls, released in 2010, presented characters inspired by monsters and fantasy creatures, offering a more alternative aesthetic; however, these dolls still tended to have thin, elongated body types that reinforced unrealistic proportions.

== LGBT ideals ==
=== Transgender women ===
Charlie Anders notes that the best-selling transsexual pornographic films depict Asian trans women, and they are highly esteemed and sought after by men identifying as straight.

A 2020 study interviewed trans women from Black, Australian Aboriginal, South Asian, East Asian, and Middle Eastern trans women living in Australia. Researchers interviewed participants about the risk factors of transmisogyny and sexual violence. Trans women of East Asian or Southeast Asian descent felt that white Australian men tend to fetishize them. This fetishization and exoticization of trans women of color left them vulnerable to sexual violence as trans women, which some felt could have been avoided if they could pass as white. Ussher's research suggests that the poor health outcomes experienced by many trans women are closely associated with their exposure to sexual violence as well as the social inequities and transphobia to which they are subjected. Trans women of color experience additional prejudice and discrimination due to the intersection of gender, sexuality, race, and social class. Swami's research also suggests that understanding these intersectionalities is vital in understanding the sexual violence experiences of trans women of color.

The construction of femininity within the transgender community largely has to do with how well (or how poorly) they are able to use the tools of "corporeal beautification provided by the commercial industries." According to Lovelock, "trans women such as Jenner are accepted as women so long as they adhere to the visual codes of female attractiveness."

=== Drag queens ===
Studies of RuPaul's Drag Race, a show that features a competition between drag queens, notes that contestants who have a smaller/skinnier body type are treated as though their femininity is more valid than larger drag queens. RuPaul's Drag Race has also been known to encourage racialized performances that play into stereotypes based on the ethnicity of the queens performing; one incidence, a queen was discouraged from putting on an Amy Winehouse performance because the queen herself was a person of color. Although drag is an important part of the LGBTQ community, most of the inspiration from which drag queens draw to formulate their looks abides by the standard of heteronormative, western beauty.

== Psychological effects ==
Feminine beauty ideals have been shown to have correlations with many psychological disorders, including lowered self-esteem and eating disorders. Western cultural standards of beauty and attractiveness promote unhealthy and unattainable body ideals that motivate women to seek perfection. Since 1972, there has been a dramatic increase in the percentage of women in the United States who experience dissatisfaction with their bodies. Research indicates that women's exposure to television, even for a very short time, can experience decreased mood and self-esteem. It has been consistently found that perceived appearance is the single strongest predictor of global self-esteem among young adults. Awareness of the "ideal" female shape is linked to increasingly negative self-esteem. Through peer interaction and an environment of continual comparison to those portrayed in the media, women are often made to feel inadequate, and thus their self-esteem can decrease from their negative self-image. A negative body image can result in adverse psychosocial consequences, including depression, poor self-esteem, and diminished quality of life.

There is significant pressure for girls to conform to feminine beauty ideals, and, since thinness is prized as feminine, many women feel dissatisfied with their body shape. Body dissatisfaction has been found to be a precursor to serious psychological problems such as depression, social anxiety, and eating disorders. Feminine beauty ideals have influenced women, particularly younger women, to partake in extreme measures. Some of these extreme measures include limiting their food intake, participating in excessive physical activity, or fixating on one's diet to try to achieve what is considered the "ideal beauty standards". One aspect of the feminine beauty ideal includes having a thin waist, which is causing women to participate in these behaviors. When trying to achieve these unnatural standards, these dangerous practices are put into place. These practices can eventually lead to the woman developing eating disorders such as anorexia and bulimia. With eating disorders as such, the obsession over one's body image and being thin reaches new levels, evolving into a rational fear of putting on weight. As achieving the "beauty ideal" becomes a more popular phenomenon, these eating disorders are becoming more prevalent, especially in young women. Researchers have found that magazine advertisements promoting dieting and thinness are far more prevalent in women's magazines than in men's magazines, and that female television characters are far more likely to be thin than male characters. Eating disorders stem from individual body dysmorphia, or an excessive preoccupation with perceived flaws in appearance. Researchers suggest that this behavior strongly correlates with societal pressure for women to live up to the standards of beauty set by a culture obsessed with being thin. Research has shown that people have subconsciously associated heavier body sizes with negative personality characteristics such as laziness and lack of self-control. Fat-body prejudice appears as young as early childhood and continues into adult years. Negative body image worsens as females go through puberty; girls in adolescence frequently report being dissatisfied with their weight and fear future weight gain. According to the National Association of Anorexia Nervosa and Associated Disorders (ANAD), the age of the onset of eating disorders is getting younger. Girls as young as elementary-school age report body dissatisfaction and dieting to look like magazine models.

Ellen Staurowsky characterized serious psychological and physical health risks that are associated with girls' negative body images. Negative body image is often associated with eating disorders, depression, and substance abuse. There is widespread evidence of damaging dissatisfaction among women and young girls with their appearance.

== Evolutionary perspectives ==
Ideas of feminine beauty may have originated from features that correlate with fertility and health. These features include a figure where there is more fat distribution in the hip and thigh area, and vary between different cultures. In both Western and Eastern cultures, having a larger waist to hip ratio (WHR) is considered attractive. While it has been shown consistently that men find women with larger WHR more attractive, this body feature does not actually show any indication of health or fertility. It is more agreeably hypothesized that attraction to WHR is an adaptive cue of parity or current pregnancy, rather than a cue of fertility. The heterosexual evolutionary perspective suggests that men, over time and across cultures, prefer youthful features (smooth skin, white eyes, full lips, good muscle tone, leg length, lumbar curvature, facial symmetry, long/full hair, feminine voice) as indications of fertility or healthy genes. These physical cues pair with behavior cues of youth (high energy, short stride, animated facial expressions) to ancestrally assess a woman's "reproductive value." These theories can help us understand why certain beauty or body trends fluctuate or remain stagnant, but some scholars argue that "unsound theoretical foundations will lead to imprecise predictions which cannot properly be tested, thus ultimately resulting in the premature rejection of an evolutionary explanation to human mate preferences."

== Philosophical viewpoints ==
In "The Perfect Bikini Body: Can We All Really Have It? Loving Gaze as an Antioppressive Beauty Ideal," philosopher Sara Protasi explores the sexist and oppressive norms of certain media that harm women, focusing on two different interpretations of beauty: the No Standards View and the Multiple Standards View. The No Standard View consists of the idea that every person is impartially beautiful, and the Multiple Standards View promotes expanding the idea of beauty standards. The issue with the No Standards View is that if every person were to be seen as impartially beautiful, paradoxically, no one would be beautiful. On the other hand, the issue with The Multiple Standards View is that it thus lacks ethical and inclusive elements. In the process of encouraging and desiring an ideal image for women to reach, other women who do not fit into the mold of certain beauty ideals are not classified as beautiful. Protasi states that beauty cannot be solely aesthetic- it has to include ethical components to be effective in promoting discussions not based on physical appearance. Protasi's proposition, The Loving View, argues inclusive and aspirational elements that the previously two mentioned views lack. In her ideal of beauty, the most beautiful and attractive individuals are the most lovable individuals, excluding what they appear as physically. Accordingly, individuals who are not deemed as lovable do not withhold beautiful elements. With Protasi's more ethical proposition of how individuals should perceive beauty and aesthetics, the feminine beauty standards women face can be discussed in the realm of ethics, inclusivity, and anti-oppressiveness, and not based purely on physical attributes.

Furthering the discussion of beauty ideals relating to ethics, philosopher Heather Widdows classifies the contemporary beauty ideal as inherently ethical. In her book "Perfect Me", Widdows emphasizes the connection between beauty and morality. She states that both the relationship between goodness and beauty, as well as evil and ugliness, display the definitive connection between beauty and morality. Widdows argues that, in certain situations, beauty is not solely representative of goodness, and it becomes the idea of virtue. Because beauty is no longer viewed as a proxy for virtue, the result is that it becomes what is desired, transforming into the ethical ideal to desire and obtain. Consequently, Widdows argues that as the ethical aspects of beauty ideas increase, beauty ideals become less of a social norm to follow and more of an ethical ideal. Individuals do not want to "fail" at being beautiful, thus furthering the idea that beauty ideals are not a preference individuals may have, but it acts as an idea that manipulates their moral judgements and causes them to act in an ethical way. Widdows states that, while individuals place value and desirability on beauty and the standards that come with it, they simultaneously judge themselves as humans in an ethical and moral way. In the realm of adhering to certain requirements of beauty ideals, moral assumptions are brought to light that discuss the moral failures women experience. The implication of failure, Widdows argues, is the path to understanding the moral and ethical nature of beauty ideals.

== Gallery ==
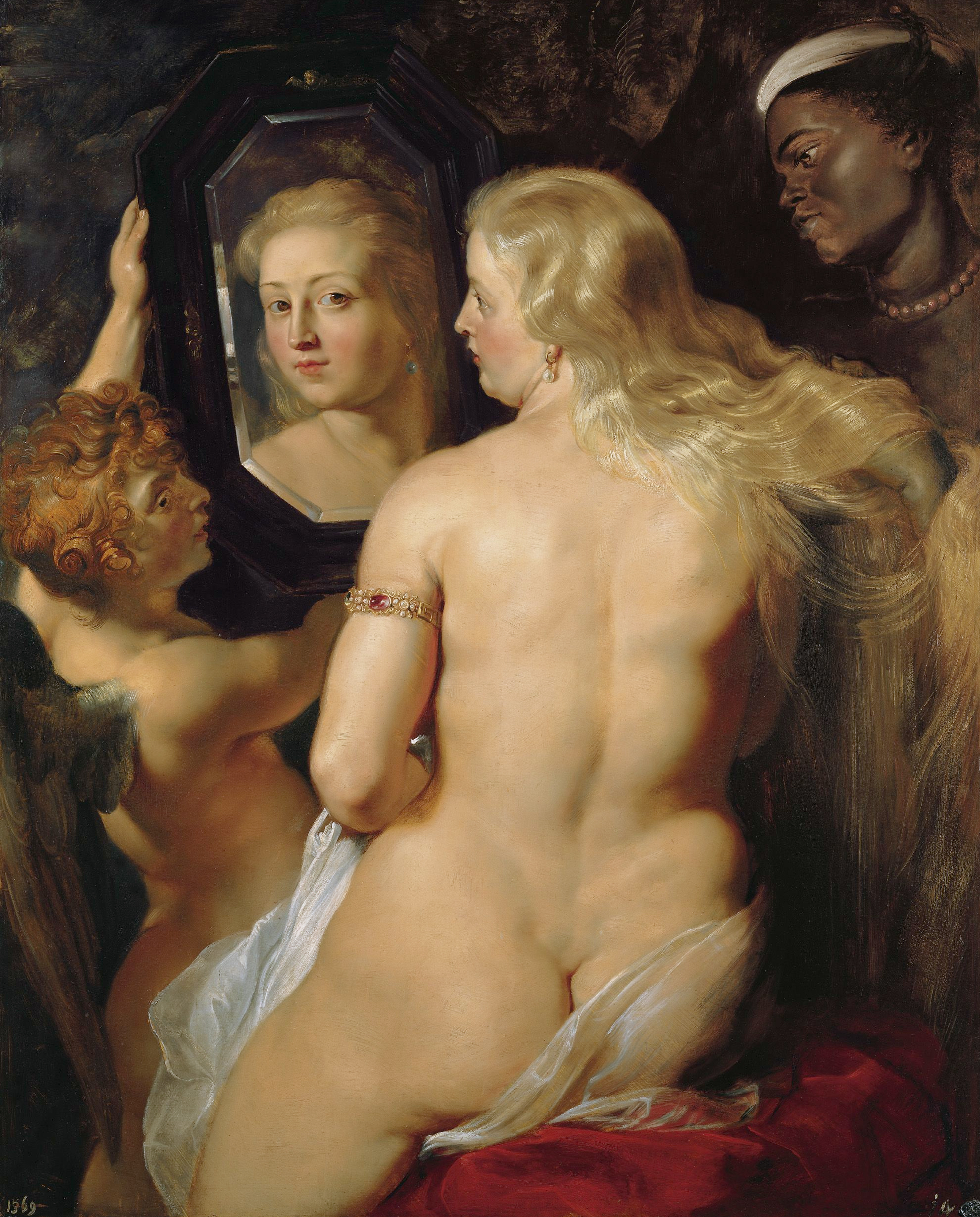
Venus at a Mirror, Peter Paul Rubens, 1615. In the 17th century, fleshier bodies were idealized.

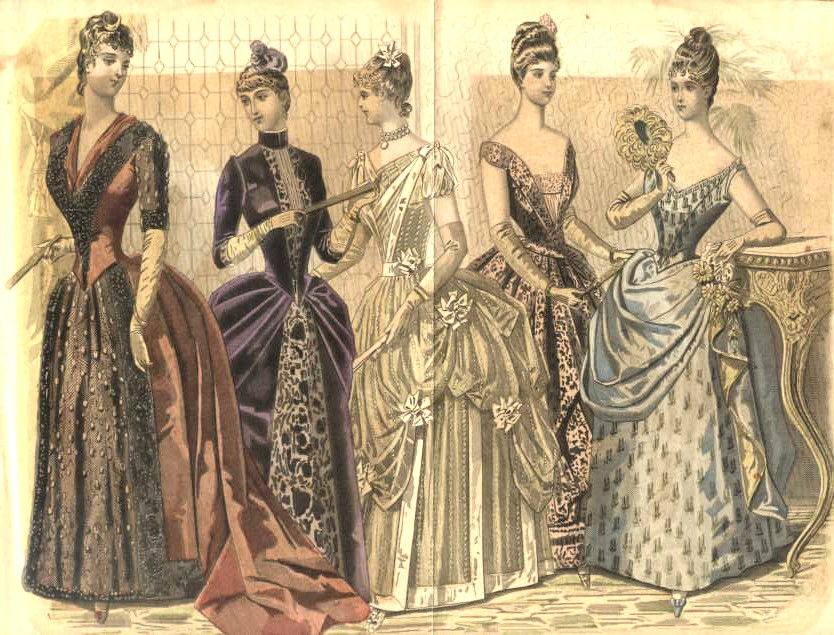
Victorian women were highly body conscious. They wore corsets to reduce their waistline, and bustles that magnified their buttocks.

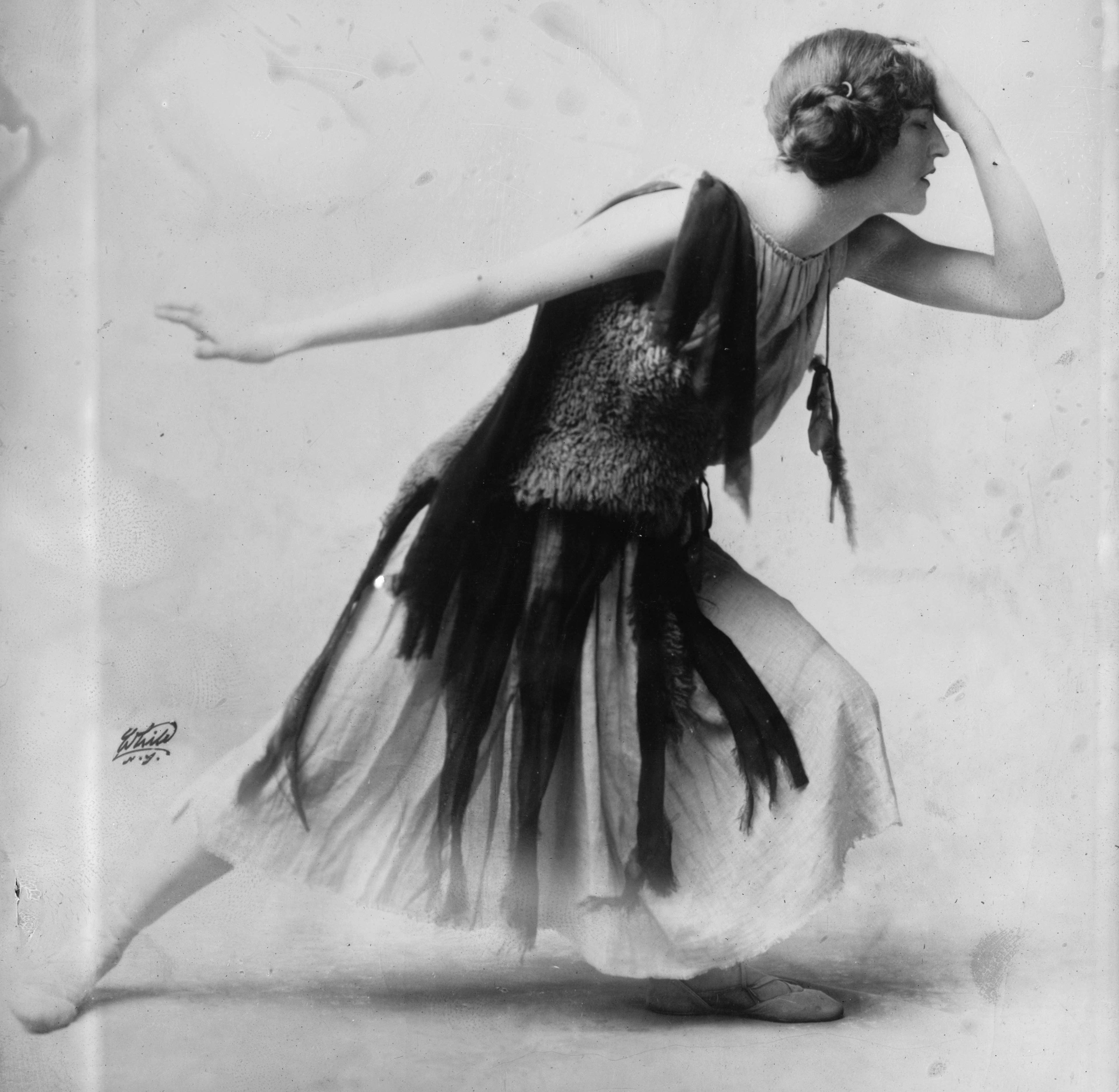
During the 1920s, women aimed to hide their curves, bobbed their hair and wore bold makeup. The feminine ideal was no longer "frail and sickly" like in the Victorian era, so women danced and did sports.

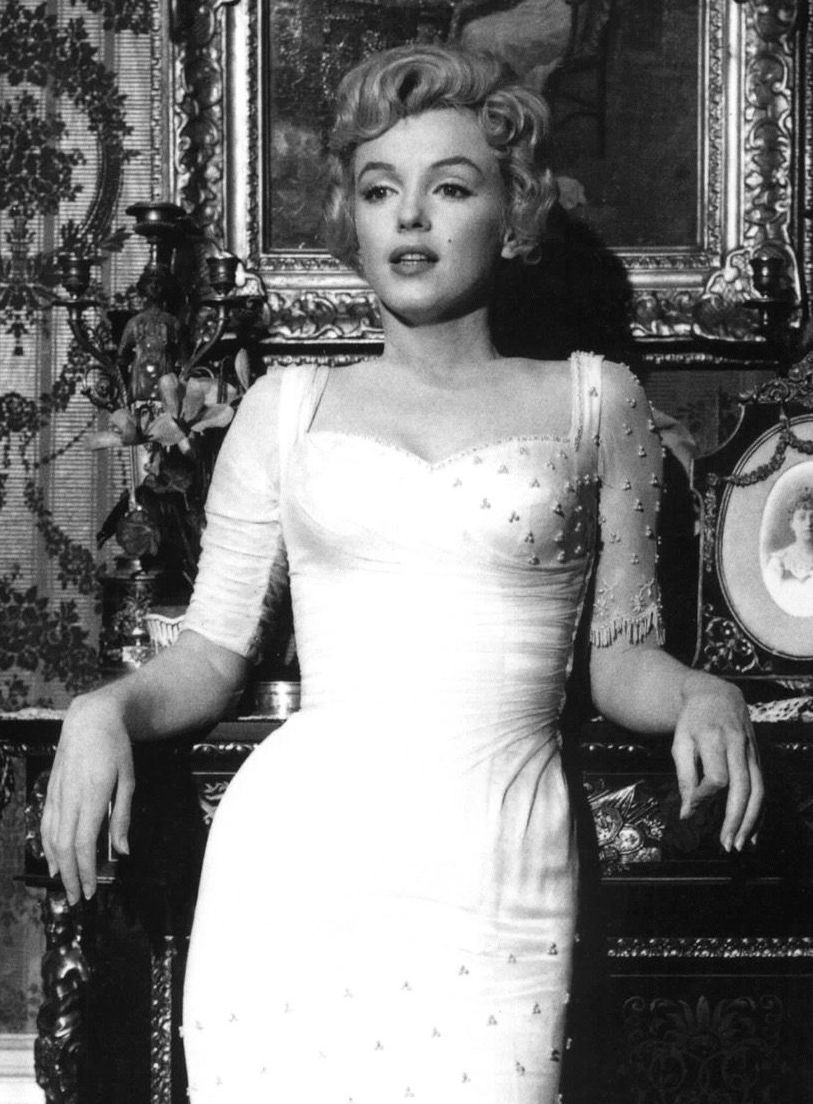
Actress Marilyn Monroe was perceived as the queen of curves in the 1950s. Her image has been used to popularize the hourglass figure.

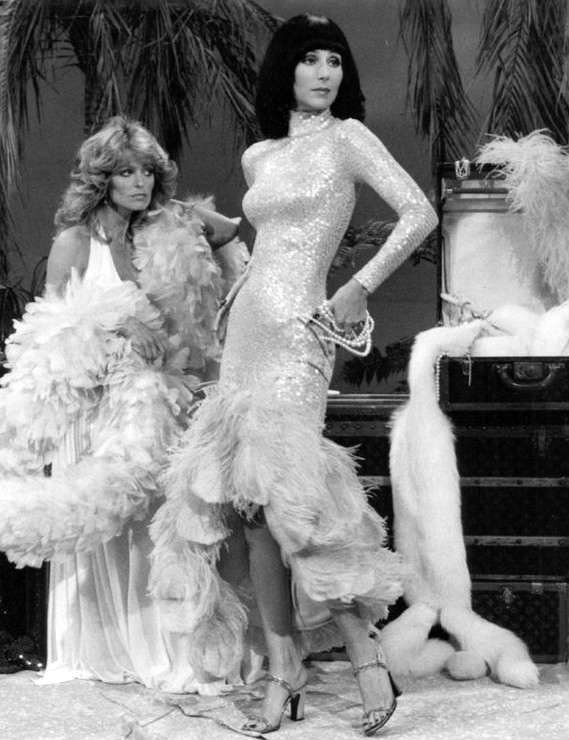
Farrah Fawcett and Cher in 1976. From the 1960s up to the 1980s, women aimed to look skinny. Tanned skin also became popular.

== See also ==
- Masculine beauty ideal
