= Shion (Overwatch) =

Fictional character in the Overwatch franchise

Lady Shion
- Overwatch character
- Shion's appearance in Overwatch
- First game: Overwatch (2026)
- Designed by: Kim-Seang "Nesskain" Hong
- Voiced by: Mariko Baika

In-universe information
- Race: Omnic
- Class: Damage
- Origin: Tokyo, Japan
- Nationality: Japanese

Lady Shion (/ˈʃiːɒn/) is a character who first appeared in the 2023 video game Overwatch, a Blizzard Entertainment–developed first-person hero shooter. A type of sentient robot called an omnic, she is an elder of the Hashimoto Clan crime organization in Tokyo, Japan, and has heavily modified her body to appear more human. Modeled after action movie series like John Wick and Kill Bill, she comes into conflict with several characters in the Overwatch universe. In all appearances, she is voiced by Mariko Baika.

Shion's appearance drew immediate reaction, praised for how stylish and cool she looked, while also taking notice of her sadistic personality, though her unique appearance drew some confusion as to whether she was a human character or an omnic. Others complained that she felt like a continuation of existing issues that had been noticed with female character design for the title, particularly in regards to her sexualization but also how frequently Blizzard Entertainment appeared to develop East Asian female characters with similar aspects with the intent to sell in-game cosmetic items for them. Despite this, some such as Kenneth Shepard of Kotaku expressed interest in the reasonings behind her character and why her appearance deviated from the expectations of omnic character designs.

== Conception and development ==
When mapping out the content for their hero shooter video game Overwatch, the developers at Blizzard Entertainment decided that the third season of its 2026 release schedule would focus on city of Tokyo, Japan, as well as the previously introduced criminal organization of the Hashimoto Clan, with the clan's elder introduced as its newest playable character. While they considered a human character early on, they decided instead to go with an omnic, a type of sentient robot in the Overwatch universe often at odds with the humans they try to coexist with. Furthermore, they decided to make the omnic a woman as they liked the idea of such a person taking over the Hashimoto Clan. Inspirations for her portrayal came from several places such as the John Wick and Kill Bill film series, with the character O-Ren Ishii from the latter serving as a specific inspiration.

Designed by artist Kim-Seang "Nesskain" Hong, unlike other omnics in the Overwatch universe, Shion has heavily modified herself to appear more human. Her appearance was meant to illustrate her inner conflict; upon gaining sentience, she was surrounded by the Hashimoto Clan frequently, leaving her questioning her identity. Narrative lead Miranda Moyer stated a theme of her character was "finding out the truth of who you are underneath all of these expectations from others" taken to an extreme, and a contrast to fellow Overwatch character Mizuki's own inner conflict. Lead character producer Kenny Hudson, in an interview with Japanese website Gamer, stated that when developing her appearance, they wanted to retain certain aspects that would tell players immediately that she is an omnic even if she appeared in another game, such as her throat glowing when she speaks, or the subtle movement of her eyes and facial expressions.

In all appearances, Shion is voiced by Mariko Baika. Sound designer Brian Weers stated that when developing her voice, they processed it in a similar way to another Overwatch playable omnic, Ramattra, manipulating it to better fit Baika's voice and performance. They considered adding vocal glitches to her audio, however the end result messed with the intelligibility of her dialogue, deciding instead to go with a more "clean, kinda fun omnic feel".

=== Design ===
Shion is a tall, slender robot woman with a gynoid-type figure. Her outfit consists of a white pair of pants and an open jacket fastened through her body by rivets and spikes, while red boots cover her feet and a gold tiger belt buckle sits on her waist. Outside of her jacket, her torso is bare and mostly exposed, with large metal plates pinning the sides of the jacket to her chest beneath her breasts. Large devices are held in a large black holsters on each hip, held by black straps that go around her thighs. Beneath her outfit. her body primarily features black and silver plating with yellow lights throughout, and gold plating on her palms and the back of her wrists. The metal plating on her chest was increased during production, as the development team wanted to emphasize "that omnic look". Moyer stated that as the film character of John Wick drew certain visual implications, they wanted Shion to have that same impact while also subverting expectations.

Meanwhile, her face mask resembles a pale Asian woman and features several fissure points running throughout, as well as red lipstick and two short, red oni-style horns on each side of her head. Though the mask is articulated with a full mouth, she speaks through her throat, with red lines that turn on as she talks. In addition, she does not blink; her irises instead change appearance to help her emote. Her hair consists of a series of ribbon cables with the backs painted white, with two long strips dangling down her front surrounding her bangs, while the rest extend down her back with a tiger-themed print. It is also asymmetric, with the right side ending in a bob, while the left exposes the side of her head. She has a grid of red lights on her forehead, a trait common to omnics.

Like other Overwatch characters, Shion received skins, unlockable cosmetic items to change her in-game appearance. Of particular note, her "Defiled Anthem" skin was developed by the company NetEase as part of their partnership with Blizzard, and released exclusively in China. Resembling a predominantly bright red spiked armor set with gold and silver highlights, it featured horns on the sides of her head, spiked wing-like protrusions from her back, and the sides of her thighs exposed. Her motorcycle saw similar changes, with a flame trail being added behind it. This skin drew complaints from players, who felt it had much higher production values than recent offerings from Blizzard themselves, and were further frustrated by the exclusivity.

== Appearances ==
Lady Shion first appears in the 2023 video game Overwatch, added in a 2026 update for the game. She is established as an omnic and a ruthless elder of the Hashimoto clan, a criminal organization set in the fictional Neon District of Tokyo, Japan. After gaining sentience, she rampaged out of fear in Tokyo, but was defeated and captured by the Hashimoto. Used for combat training by the organization, when they dropped their guard she broke free and killed the elders of the clan, winning her freedom and giving herself a seat on their council. After doing so, she began to partake in what the previous elders enjoyed, such as certain clothing and riding motorcycles. Shion has also modified her body to more resemble a human's, as she sees herself not as an omnic but "inhuman". While her struggles left her with a ruthless personality, she has an affinity for characters such as Sojourn, whose body has also been enhanced with cybernetics.

Referenced in earlier story material, she was formally introduced in the animated short "End of the Line", where she comes into conflict with global peace-keeping taskforce group Overwatch, specifically Sojourn, who attempts to stop a Hashimoto weapon shipment meant for the terrorist group Talon. Shion fights Sojourn, and while most of the shipment is destroyed, she and her men escape with one crate and complete the delivery, expecting that Talon's leader Vendetta will be pleased with it. She later appeared in the motion comic "Facing Demons", which detailed the ninja Mizuki's backstory. In it, she is shown to have taken in Mizuki as a young boy to be part of the Hashimoto clan, intending to shape him as a weapon to her own ends. While she is harsh on him, she suggests this is meant to be a kindness. However, she is also using her treatment of him to force blacksmith Toshiro, a member of a rival clan and father of the ninja Kiriko, to develop weapons for her. When Mizuki betrays her to both help Overwatch and rescue Toshiro, he comes into direct conflict with Shion, who is enraged by his betrayal and attacks him. Despite her statements that his allies would never accept him if they knew all he did for her, he rejects her reasoning and escapes.

=== Gameplay ===
In Overwatch, Shion is classified as a Damage-class character, designed to provide a more offensive role in team compositions. Her primary weapons are two Kira Pistols, one in each hand that alternate while firing. Shion also has several abilities that require activation, though each have a "cooldown" period after use and are unable to be used again during that duration. "Execution" fires her pistols in a multi-shot attack at a target, while "Evade" allows her to dodge incoming attacks. "Joyride" allows her to mount and travel upon her red motorcycle, which she can dismount to launch as a projectile against opponents. Lastly, her 'ultimate' ability, called "Satsuriku Spree", must be charged before use. The ability charges slowly during the course of gameplay, and can be charged faster through damage dealt to the enemy team. Once full, the ability can be activated to allow her dash forward in a spinning motion up to three times, firing her guns as she does.

When developing her gameplay, Shion was developed as a "glass cannon" archetype, able to do heavy damage but requiring the need of evasive actions and fighting at a distance to stay alive. Some elements caused issues however, such as the Joyride attack accidentally giving her a smaller hitbox than when she was standing, until they developed new processes to stretch it over the motorcycle itself. In addition, to emphasize a more highly mobile approach to gameplay, she was developed with the ability for her attacks to combo into one another in mind. Inspiration for this aspect was taken from Capcom's Devil May Cry franchise, complete with the gauge system that title uses to track performance. However, when they realized the on-screen indicator was more stressful for players than fun, and faced with an uncertainty on how to reward players for maxing it out, the gauge was removed and they instead worked on how her attacks synergized with one another.

== Critical reception ==
Shion's appearance prior to her upgrades that gave her a more human-looking design, as seen in the Ambush short story. The contrast between a traditional omnic appearance and in-game look has served as a significant point of discussion, both in-game and in reception from media outlets.

Early impressions of Shion were positive, with Scott Duwe of Destructoid stating that her face immediately drew attention from how differentiated her from other omnic characters who had a more metallic appearance, and he further found the potential of her dual-wielding gunplay to be personally interesting. However, some fans and Tyler Colp of PC Gamer expressed confusion whether she was supposed to be a human or omnic, due to her distinct appearance and some of the trailer's dialogue. Meanwhile, Ana Washenko of Engadget expressed that while the character was designed with an emphasis on attractiveness and had a similar face to other female characters in Overwatch, she described Shion as one of the team's most dramatic creations in some time, "looking very stylish in an all-white suit paired with petite red horns and cybernetic red eyes". Aaron Down of PCGamesN praised her design, emphasizing how her expressive face made her different from other omnics. Calling it a modern twist on a geisha mask, he felt it fit cyberpunk themes of self-modification. He additionally called out her sadistic personality as shown in the trailer towards a bar patron, stating that there was "a sub-section of the Overwatch community [...] pounding the floor, wishing it was them right now". While her gameplay was not shown, he theorized how her oni-styling could play into it, and felt that she would likely be a popular character in the game.

Others were more critical, referencing past complaints with how Overwatch approached some of their female characters. Den of Geek stated that when isolated she had a cool design, but in the context of Overwatch she illustrated problems the design team faced. Elaborating, he expressed that her white suit compliment the red lights running through her body, and how the combination of human and robotic elements coupled with a "badass moveset" would work well in any hero shooter, let alone video games in general. However, he pointed that her design served as a departure from the traditional appearance of omnics, and suggested it was done strictly to sexualize her with the addition of human-shaped buttocks and breasts. While he felt the development team could likely explain these deviations in the game's lore, Jackson further argued it represented a formulaic approach to female character design, citing the previously released Anran and Sierra as additional examples, while other omnics such as Ramattra were given more distinct looks. He argued that this sent the message that the development team chose to "care about creating conventionally attractive women over thoughtful characterization".

Olivia Richman in an article for Esports.net expressed similar concerns, questioning why Blizzard Entertainment had chosen to give "this ruthless robot gangster the soft, perfectly symmetrical face of a conventionally attractive, youthful East Asian woman". She further noted the discontent of some fans on social media regarding the design, pointing to previous issues with Anran, whose face was redesigned after similar complaints resulting in game director Aaron Keller to issue an apology. In light of how they felt little was changed afterwards for Anran over an emphasis to keep her marketable, Richman stated such fans were further annoyed by Shion's reveal, indicating that they had learned nothing from the debacle. Meanwhile, others pointed to a portrayed mindset that seemed to suggest male characters in Overwatch could come in a variety of shapes, some of which monstrous, while female characters felt exclusively attractive, and that she served more as a "gooner bait" character archetype meant to sell in-game cosmetics to players. Richman herself questioned why a female robot "needs a perfect skincare routine and pristine eyeliner to make the cut", and that while lore-wise she felt interesting, in terms of design she felt like "the latest model off the assembly line".

While Kenneth Shephard of Kotaku shared similar complaints to other outlets and fans in how Blizzard appeared to be leaning too heavy with clear effort into one particular East Asian character archetype, he still felt she had a "stylish gunslinger thing going on", and that her distorted voice was "intimidating and a bit sultry". He found the story implications around her appearance to be interesting, specifically in how an omnic would both want to make their presence known and more closely resemble humans, given the series has illustrated divisiveness between the two races. He expressed that a self-hating complex for her character could provide an interesting story route, though felt a more bold design not aimed to sell in-game cosmetics may have been lost in the design process. In a post-release article, he expressed appreciation for how her "violent nature is always under the surface of even the most polite conversations" which was more evident in combat, and found character explorations illustrating how she made herself look more human to be compelling.

GameSpot's Jessica Cogswell stated that as the first playable female omnic in the game, Shion presented exciting opportunities in terms of gameplay and story, and that after speaking with the developers at Blizzard, one of the takeaways was that her design was not meant to be merely a case of sex sells. Cogswell conceded that while some of the statements regarding Shion echoed those Hideo Kojima had made for his character Quiet during Metal Gear Solid V's launch, she felt judgement towards the character should wait until her story was more fleshed out. She further pointed out that many of Overwatch's villains tended to have a "heartwrenching and sympathetic backstory", one that would likely make her desire for power understandable, and shared fans speculations that it may be one of the more mature that the series has tried to tell.
