= Baizhu =

Baizhu may refer to:

- Baizhu, a character in the 2020 video game Genshin Impact
- Baizhu (Chinese: 白术; pinyin: báizhú), a name for the plant Atractylodes macrocephala, a cultivated species that grows in central China
- Baizhu, Guangdong, a town in the urban district of Gaoyao, Zhaoqing in western Guangdong, China
- Baizhu, Jiangxi, a township in Xiangdong, Pingxiang, a district of Pingxiang in Jiangxi province, China
