= Anran =

Fictional character in the Overwatch franchise

Anran Ye
- Overwatch character
- Anran's appearance in Overwatch
- First game: Overwatch (2026)
- Designed by: Angela Song
- Voiced by: Fareeha Andersen

In-universe information
- Class: Damage
- Origin: China
- Nationality: Chinese

Anran Ye (/ˈɑːnˌrɑːn/) is a character who first appeared in the 2023 video game Overwatch, a first-person hero shooter developed by Blizzard Entertainment, and was added to the game's roster in a 2026 update. The older sister of Wuyang, she is a student at Wuxing University's Fire College in China. When the area comes under attack, she fights alongside her brother to defend it, and is later recruited into the global peacekeeping task force Overwatch. In all appearances, she is voiced by Fareeha Andersen.

Her inclusion in the game was teased prior to her release, seeing a mixed response due to concerns that Blizzard had begun regularly introducing attractive East Asian characters primarily meant to sell skins to that audience. Upon the reveal of her final character model, many fans and media critics noted that she had a "baby face" that was more conventionally attractive and demure-looking than in earlier comic strip appearances. This led to several complaints, with some questioning Blizzard's prior statements regarding character diversity, with Andersen also voicing her concerns. In response, the development team updated her appearance in April 2026. Her new, more aggressive appearance was praised by both critics and fans as a marked improvement, though some fans believed the changes were overly conservative.

== Conception and design ==
Anran was created by Blizzard Entertainment for their first-person hero shooter Overwatch, designed by concept artist Angela Song, and part of a five character group introduced in the game at once to reinforce a new narrative direction for the retitle following its rebranding to just Overwatch. Originally, Anran was intended as solely a character for her brother Wuyang's backstory. According to Lead Narrative Designer Miranda Moyer, while they often create characters for the story that will become playable later, that was not their initial intention with her. However, as Moyer became more involved with developing the upcoming narrative, she felt it was a good and natural point to bring them into the game itself.

In terms of appearance, she is a tall Asian woman with black hair tied up into a ponytail above her head, with a long yellow ribbon holding it in place. Her outfit consists of an orange, white, and black shoulderless qipao that ends shortly before the thigh, with the sleeves having feather-like extensions on the back. Fingerless gloves cover her hands, while bracers cover her lower wrists. She wears shorts beneath the qipao with a charm dangling off the left hip, a wrap on the left knee, and sneakers on her feet. Art director Dion Rogers added that she was modeled after the concept of a modern fire magician, with consideration on how these abilities would work such as a flamethrower, and artistically implementing many fire themes into her design.

== Appearances ==
Anran Ye is a young Chinese woman with abilities based around fire, first introduced in the 2023 video game Overwatch in a 2026 update for the title. She is the older sister of Wuyang and a student at Wuxing University's Fire College in China. She first appeared in the game's official comic "Against the Tide", where she and Wuyang protected the area from a hostile group of Omnic robots. She and her brother were then invited to join Overwatch, a newly reformed global peacekeeping taskforce. In all appearances, she is voiced by Fareeha Andersen.

In Overwatch, Anran is classified as a Damage-class character, designed to provide a more offensive role in team compositions. She fights using a pair of Zhuque Fans, with the primary fire launching fireball projectiles, while the secondary fire creates a gust of heat. Enemies hit with the projectiles will have a bar gradually fill up from subsequent hits. Once full, the target will take burning damage, which can be amplified by hitting them with Anran's secondary fire attack. Anran also has several abilities that require activation, though the first two have a "cooldown" period after use and are unable to be used again during that duration. "Inferno Rush" propels her forward, damaging enemies in her path. Meanwhile, "Dancing Blaze" launches several forward quick strikes, before pulling her back into the position she started from when launching the attack. During this time, there is a brief window where she can reposition herself, allowing the player additional maneuverability options.

Lastly, her 'ultimate' ability, called "Vermillion Ascent", requires to be charged before use. The ability charges slowly during the course of gameplay, and can be charged faster through damage dealt to the enemy team. When used, Anran will charge forward and release an explosion on impact, dealing significant damage to all targets within the area-of-effect. However, if she is killed during gameplay while her ultimate is charged, it will automatically activate instead as "Vermillion Revival". In this instance, an explosion will take place where she was killed, and she will revive immediately shortly after.

== Critical reception ==
Anran's release was hinted at early on due to her inclusion in story media alongside Wuyang suggesting she would join Overwatch, and later further confirmed when data mined voice files from the game were found referencing her. Kenneth Shepard of Kotaku suggested she represented several of the problems with the title, namely a further imbalance in character roles for Overwatch. He also observed how some fans felt she followed a trend of conventionally attractive characters introduced into the game to sell more skins, unlockable cosmetic items that change a character's in-game appearance, despite being mostly disconnected from the game's story at large. Additional concerns were raised that Blizzard showed favoritism towards East Asian characters when it came to developing such content, despite their earlier claims of being dedicated to diversity.

Wenzhou Business College lecturer Chen Menghan in an article for Sixth Tone praised the cultural representation both Wuyang and Anran introduced into the game being established as college students, something she felt immediately relatable to a younger Chinese audience. Going further, she enjoyed how Anran was portrayed as "forceful, impatient, and quick to challenge her younger brother" in relation to her fire element, and in doing so introduced a relatable social structure to the characters of sibling rivalry, family expectations, and also parental pressure that implied social lives beyond just being a part of their backstory. Menghan compared these elements to the game's previously introduced chinese characters, Mei, stating that where Mei's ethnicity felt strictly surface level through her language and nationality, the Ye siblings illustrated their cultural identity through their behavior, with Anran emerging not only as a symbol of China but being the older sister driving her brother to do better.

=== Design criticism ===
Anran's face upon release was criticized for its similarity to several other female characters in Overwatch. Pictured is a composite image comparing her with edits using the hairstyles and accessories of Juno, Kiriko, D.Va, Mei and Tracer.

However, upon the character's in-game debut, many felt her face did not resemble what was shown in earlier story media for the game, and instead she bore more of a resemblance to existing Asian characters Kiriko and Juno, specifically in regards to details such as an emphasized small nose and softer features. Shepard, in another article for Kotaku, cited it as an example of how the game had begun to share too many facial details, a criticism that arose with prior characters such as Freja. TheGamer's Jade King stated while she was initially hopeful Anran's sharper features would translate into a distinct-looking character in the game, she considered the end results "babyfied". Going further, King stated that it felt to her like the development team was trying to mimic earlier successes they had seen with Kiriko and Juno, and as a result "she now feels forgettable". King further felt the process was "borderline misogynistic" in how it emphasized "cutesy" sexualization, and was unlike how Blizzard had approached even more overt characters like Widowmaker.

Sofia Guimarães of eSports.gg attributed some of the issue to Overwatch being a heavily stylized hero shooter and the development team's art style. Stating the characters tended to have "smooth skin, clean facial structures, and clear silhouettes", she acknowledged that while this aspect helped make the characters immediately recognizable for both players and non-players, it led to them looking less visually distinct from one another, especially once cosmetic skins were factored in. She went further to state that this was not strictly an issue with Overwatch, pointing to titles such as Riot Games' League of Legends that received similar complaints. Guimarães additionally argued that a unified portrayal of characters not only helped with brand recognition, but helped streamline development processes and was a trend unlikely to be abandoned anytime soon by video game developers.

Blizzard responded to some of the criticism, with senior producer Kenny Hudson stating that creating conventionally attractive heroes was out of necessity due to "technical needs". Explaining further, he expressed that when developing the characters they aimed to make them more unique, but still able to easily develop in-game cosmetics for the character. In response, GamesRadar+ writer Kaan Serin stated that this did not address the claim of characters' faces becoming more "homogenized", and cited how some fans had come to refer to what had occurred with Anran's face as "Kirikofication".

Meanwhile, fans began contributing their own redesign proposals for the character's face. Anran's voice actress Fareeha Andersen weighed in on the debate herself, stating that she did not want to step on the developer's toes and saw them as doing their best. Nonetheless, Andersen expressed she "mourned" her character, feeling that the original design in the short challenged "the beauty standards plaguing, ransacking media these days", particularly describing the character's nose in her finalized appearance as "ozempic chic". Going further, she stated the changed design felt at odds with the development team's goals, and made her instead look "like the younger sibling, she looks more docile, somehow". Anderson added she had been collecting the redesigns fans had done, and hoped to show them to the development team.

Shortly afterwards, game director Aaron Keller confirmed that in response to the feedback, they would be making adjustments to Anran's face over the course of the next few months, stating the developers were "currently discussing what it will take to make Anran look and feel more like the fierce, older sister that we all envision her to be". Scott Duwe praised the response, feeling that while such a change would not occur overnight he found it admirable that they were quick to turn the situation around, and he looked forward to the visual variety the change would bring. He also praised the community's handling of the matter, praising their kind and respectful reaction in delivering feedback.

The redesign of Anran's face was shown a week ahead of its update in Season 2 during April 2026. Keller said that the new changes Anran were to reflect that she is "confident, determined, fierce and a natural born leader, and we want her visuals in-game to convey that personality, so we made some adjustments to her face." While players' reactions were mixed to the changes, Andersen said she was "grateful for this update, she looks much more like the strong older sibling we knew her to be." Lauren Bergin of PCGamesN stated that while fan response was mixed with many feeling the alterations were minimal, after looking at Blizzard's infographics highlighting the change she found them substantial. She added that while she felt more could be done, "Anran does look and feel like the character we wanted her to be", and she considered the development team listening to player feedback a rare and positive instance.
