= Xanthe Huynh =

American voice actress

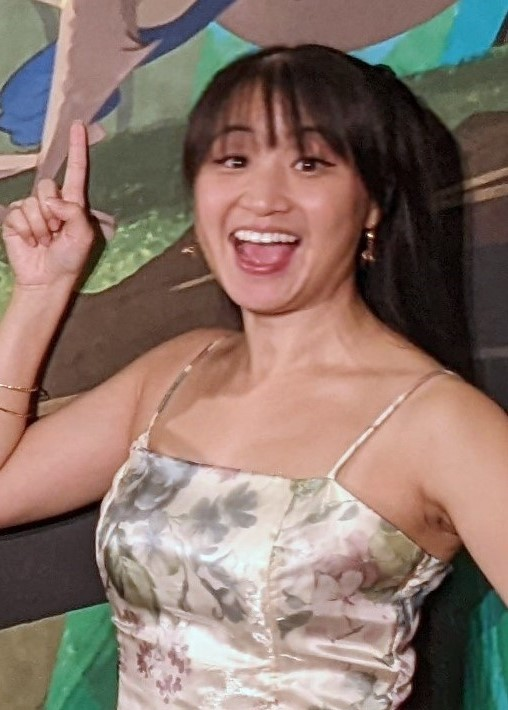
- Huynh in 2022
- Education: University of California, Irvine
- Occupation: Voice actress
- Years active: 2008–present
- Agent: Dean Panaro Talent
- Website: xanthesvoice.com

Xanthe Huynh (/ˈzænθi ˈhwɪn/) is an American voice actress known for her voice work in English dubs of anime series. Her most well known roles include Haru Okumura in Persona 5, Ui Hirasawa in K-On!, Altina Orion in The Legend of Heroes: Trails of Cold Steel II, Alluka Zoldyck in Hunter × Hunter, Yuna in Yuki Yuna is a Hero, Hanayo Koizumi in Love Live!, Marianne in Fire Emblem: Three Houses, Takina Inoue in Lycoris Recoil, Meiko "Menma" Honma in Anohana: The Flower We Saw That Day, and Sachi in Sword Art Online.

== Filmography ==
=== Anime ===
List of voice performances in anime
Year	Title	Role	Notes	Source
2008	Aika R-16: Virgin Mission	Member		
2008	The Familiar of Zero	Siesta	Season 1	
2008	Magical Girl Lyrical Nanoha	Suzuka Tsukimura		
2009	Magical Girl Lyrical Nanoha A's	Suzuka Tsukimura		
2009	Tweeny Witches: The Adventures	Aichan		
2011	Squid Girl	Sanae Nagatsuki	Season 1	
2011–2013	K-On!	Ui Hirasawa	2 TV series and film	
2013	Sword Art Online	Sachi		
2014	Blood Lad	Fuyumi Yanagi	Also OVA	
2015	Yuki Yuna Is a Hero	Yuna Yuki	TV series	
2015	A Lull in the Sea	Miuna Shiodome	TV series	
2016	Love Live!	Hanayo Koizumi	2 TV series and film	
2016	One-Punch Man	Girl A	Episode 1	
2017	Anohana: The Flower We Saw That Day	Meiko "Menma" Honma		
2017	The Dragon Dentist	Nonoko Kishi		
2017	The Testament of Sister New Devil	Yuki Nonaka	Season 1	
2017	March Comes In like a Lion	Momo Kawamoto		
2017	Occultic;Nine	Chizu Kawabata		
2018	Sword Gai The Animation	Rie Matoba	Netflix dub	
2018	FLCL Progressive	Hidomi Hibajiri		
2018	Re:Zero − Starting Life in Another World	Plum Risch		
2018	Sword Art Online Alternative: Gun Gale Online	Moe Annaka		
2018	Sailor Moon SuperS	Palla-Palla	Viz Media dub	
2018	A.I.C.O. Incarnation	Aico Tachibana	Bang Zoom! dub	
2019	Hunter × Hunter (2011)	Alluka Zoldyck		
2019	The Rising of the Shield Hero	Rifana	Episode 15	
2019	Cells at Work!	Platelet		
2019	Carole & Tuesday	Katy Kimura		
2019	Demon Slayer: Kimetsu no Yaiba	Tokie, Kibutsuji's daughter		
2019	Welcome to Demon School! Iruma-kun	Keroli Crocell / "Akudol" Kuromu		
2020	Pokémon Journeys: The Series	Lauren	Episode 8	
2020	BNA: Brand New Animal	Nazuna Hiwatashi, Elza	Netflix dub	
2020	Persona 5: The Animation	Haru Okumura		
2020	Aggretsuko	Miggy	Netflix dub	
2020	Jujutsu Kaisen	Setsuko Sasaki		
2020	Appare-Ranman!	Sofia Taylor	1st Funimation role	
2020	Higurashi: When They Cry – GOU	Hanyuu	2020 Anime, also SOTSU	
2020	Yashahime: Princess Half-Demon	Mei Higurashi		
2020	The Irregular at Magic High School	Mizuki Shibata		
2021	Black Rock Shooter	Mato Kuroi		
2021	Kuroko's Basketball	Satsuki Momoi	Netflix dub	
2021	Kuma Kuma Kuma Bear	Fina		
2021	I've Been Killing Slimes for 300 Years and Maxed Out My Level	Halkara		
2021	Vivy: Fluorite Eye's Song	Ophelia		
2021	Scarlet Nexus	Tsugumi Nazar		
2021	The Case Study of Vanitas	Vanitas of the Blue Moon	Episode 1	
2021	Kageki Shojo!!	Ai Narata		
2021	The Detective Is Already Dead	Siesta		
2021	Dropout Idol Fruit Tart	Nina Maehara		
2021	The Heike Story	Biwa		
2021	Restaurant to Another World 2	Ranija		
2021	Pokémon Evolutions	Naoko		
2022	She Professed Herself Pupil of the Wise Man	Mariana		
2022	In the Land of Leadale	Cayna		
2022	Tokyo 24th Ward	Asumi Suido		
2022	The Prince of Tennis	Sakuno Ryuzaki	Crunchyroll dub	
2022	Vampire in the Garden	Momo	Lead role; English dub	
2022	Orient	Michiru		
2022	Lycoris Recoil	Takina Inoue		
2022	Housing Complex C	Kimi		
2023	A Place Further than the Universe	Mari Tamaki		
2023	Heavenly Delusion	Tarao		
2023	Pokémon Horizons: The Series	Ann		
2024	Kimi ni Todoke	Sawako Kuronuma	Lead role; English dub	
2024	That Time I Got Reincarnated as a Slime Season 3	Jiwu		
2025	Sakamoto Days	Sachiko, Osaragi		
2025	Witch Watch	Kukumi Ureshino		
2025	Blue Box	Chinatsu Kano		
2025	Secrets of the Silent Witch	Agatha, Lana		
2025	Rascal Does Not Dream of Santa Claus	Sara Himeji		
2026	The Ghost in the Shell	Operator		
2026	Medalist	Rinna Sarukawa		

=== Animation ===
List of voice performances in animation
Year	Title	Role	Notes	Source
2017	Stitch & Ai	Meiying	English-language Chinese donghua (original English version released in 2018); co-credited with Cherami Leigh in all episodes	
2022	Link Click	Emma, Young Emma, Young Cheng	Chinese donghua; English dub	
2022	Miraculous: Tales of Ladybug & Cat Noir	Fei Wu/Ladydragon	Season 5, episodes "Jubilation", "Action" and "Re-creation (The Final Day - Part 2)".	
2024	Tomb Raider: The Legend of Lara Croft	Daji	Episode: "Yinyang"	
2024	Rock Paper Scissors	Hilda/Host	Episode: "The Fart Joke Debate"	
2026-present	Avatar: Seven Havens	Lan, Various voices		

=== Film ===
List of voice performances in direct-to-video and television films
Year	Title	Role	Notes	Source
2008	Kite Liberator	Monaka Noguchi		
2012	Oblivion Island: Haruka and the Magic Mirror	Researcher		
2015	Puella Magi Madoka Magica The Movie Part 3: Rebellion	Nagisa Momoe		
2016	Love Live! The School Idol Movie	Hanayo Koizumi		
2018	Liz and the Blue Bird	Ririka Kenzaki		
2018	Maquia: When the Promised Flower Blooms	Maquia		
2020	Dragon Quest: Your Story	Nera Briscoletti		
2021	Miraculous World: Shanghai, The Legend of Ladydragon	Fei Wu/Ladydragon		
2021	Sailor Moon Eternal	Palla-Palla/Sailor Pallas, Phobos		
2024	Sailor Moon Cosmos	Phobos, Sailor Pallas		
2025	Virgin Punk: Clockwork Girl	Ubu Kamigori		

=== Video games ===
List of voice performances in video games
Year	Title	Role	Notes	Source
2008	Summon Night: Twin Age	Ayn		
2008	Luminous Arc 2	Luna		
2009	Avalon Code	Fana		
2009	Rune Factory Frontier	Mist		
2012	Hyperdimension Neptunia Mk2	Falcom (DLC), White Disk	Also Re;Birth 2	
2012	Atelier Meruru: The Apprentice of Arland	Meruru	Also Plus	
2013	Hyperdimension Neptunia Victory	Falcom, Ultradimension Falcom (DLC)	Also Re;Birth 3	
2014	Unhack	Weedy		
2014	The Witch and the Hundred Knight	Mani		
2015	Hyperdevotion Noire: Goddess Black Heart	Poona, Ein Al		
2016	The Legend of Heroes: Trails of Cold Steel II	Altina Orion		
2017	Persona 5	Haru Okumura		
2017	Paladins	Willo		
2017	Fallen Legion: Flames of Rebellion and Sins of an Empire	Cecille		
2017	Summon Night 6	Aya		
2017	PWND	Risa Ito		
2017	A Hat in Time	Cooking Cat		
2018	BlazBlue: Cross Tag Battle	Vatista		
2018	Fist of the North Star: Lost Paradise	Lin	English dub	
2018	Valkyria Chronicles 4	Nico Emery		
2018	Persona 5: Dancing in Starlight	Haru Okumura	Also Persona 3: Dancing in Moonlight as DLC	
2018	Fire Emblem Heroes	Eir, Marianne von Edmund		
2019	God Eater 3	Female player voices 8 and 12		
2019	Super Smash Bros. Ultimate	Haru Okumura		
2019	Death end re;Quest	Rin Asukaze		
2019	Zanki Zero: Last Beginning	Rinko Susukino		
2019	Fire Emblem: Three Houses	Marianne von Edmund		
2019	River City Girls	Sabuko		
2019	Crystar	Yuri Minano		
2019	Pokémon Masters	Erika		
2019	Catherine: Full Body	Haru Okumura		
2019	The Legend of Heroes: Trails of Cold Steel III	Altina Orion		
2020	Persona 5 Royal	Haru Okumura		
2020	KartRider Rush+	Diz		
2020	Guardian Tales	Neva		
2020	Death end re;Quest 2	Rin Asukaze, Victorie Millet		
2020	Marble Knights	Marabelle		
2020	The Legend of Heroes: Trails of Cold Steel IV	Altina Orion		
2020	13 Sentinels: Aegis Rim	Miwako Sawatari		
2020	Genshin Impact	Changsheng		
2021	Persona 5 Strikers	Haru Okumura		
2021	Scarlet Nexus	Tsugumi Nazar		
2021	Neo: The World Ends with You	Kanon Tachibana		
2021	Shadowverse: Champion's Battle	Mimori Amamiya		
2021	Mary Skelter Finale	Ellie		
2021	Demon Slayer: Kimetsu no Yaiba – The Hinokami Chronicles	Muzan's Daughter		
2021	Lost Judgment	Kyoko Amasawa	English dub	
2022	Phantom Breaker: Omnia	Maestra		
2022	Relayer	Terra		
2022	Rune Factory 5	Infant, Child, Ranger		
2022	Triangle Strategy	Narve Oparyn		
2022	Fire Emblem Warriors: Three Hopes	Marianne von Edmund		
2022	Star Ocean: The Divine Force	Sayuri T. Sanjo		
2022	River City Girls 2	Jam Kuradoberi, Mihoko, Sabuko, Shizuka		
2022	Goddess of Victory: Nikke	Neon	Originally uncredited in-game; but confirmed during game's 1st anniversary livestream	
2022	Path to Nowhere	Pepper, Pacassi, Hestia		
2023	Octopath Traveler II	Agnea Bristarni		
2023	Master Detective Archives: Rain Code	Fubuki Clockford		
2023	Honkai: Star Rail	Pela (Pelageya Sergeyevna)		
2023	Genshin Impact	Changsheng	Baizhu's companion	
2023	Arknights	Cuora		
2023	Loop8: Summer of Gods	Konoha Oyama		
2023	The Legend of Heroes: Trails into Reverie	Altina Orion, Soldiers & Citizens of Zemuria		
2023	Rhapsody II: Ballad of the Little Princess	Cherie		
2023	Rhapsody III: Memories of Marl Kingdom	Puppet Kururu, Cherie, Narration		
2023	Anonymous;Code	Riko Sawai		
2023	Eternights	Min		
2023	The Legend of Nayuta: Boundless Trails	Creha		
2023	Like a Dragon Gaiden: The Man Who Erased His Name	Haruka Sawamura		
2023	Persona 5 Tactica	Haru Okumura		
2024	Like a Dragon: Infinite Wealth	Haruka Sawamura		
2024	Unicorn Overlord	Umerus		
2024	Sand Land	Additional voices		
2024	Overwatch 2	Juno		
2024	Marvel Rivals	Tandy Bowen/Dagger		
2024	Romancing SaGa 2: Revenge of the Seven	Licorice/Dancer		
2024	Harry Potter: Quidditch Champions	Cho Chang		
2025	Like a Dragon: Pirate Yakuza in Hawaii	Additional voices		
2025	Rune Factory: Guardians of Azuma	Rin		
2026	The Legend of Heroes: Trails Beyond the Horizon	Altina Orion		
2026	Yakuza 3 Kiwami & Dark Ties	Haruka Sawamura		
2026	Avatar Legends: The Fighting Game	Kyoshi		
2026	Neverness to Everness	Blackbird		

=== Live-action ===
List of live-action appearances in television and film
Year	Title	Role	Notes	Source
2008	Adventures in Voice Acting	Herself		
2024	Like a Dragon: Yakuza	Yumi Sawamura	English Dub	
