= Juno (Overwatch) =

Overwatch character

Juno Teo Minh
- Overwatch character
- Juno's appearance in Overwatch
- First game: Overwatch (2024)
- Designed by: Daryl Tan
- Voiced by: Xanthe Huynh

In-universe information
- Class: Support
- Origin: Mars

Juno Teo Minh is a character who first appeared in the 2023 video game Overwatch, a Blizzard Entertainment–developed first-person hero shooter, added to the game's roster in a 2024 update. Designed by Daryl Tan, she is a "Support"-class hero. A woman of Vietnamese heritage, Juno was born in a human colony on Mars, and comes to Earth seeking help for her colony which is suffering from diminishing supplies. In the game and related media for the franchise, she is voiced by Xanthe Huynh.

The character has been well received by video game writers and players alike. She has become one of the franchise's more popular characters among those introduced in the sequel, with her in-game pick rate by players noted to be high. Juno's in-game mechanics have also been well received by video game journalists, who have praised her character for rewarding a player's game sense. However, some criticism has been levied toward the character's design due to perceptions of whitewashing of her East Asian features, and complaints of oversexualization.

== Conception and development ==
The concept for the character has its origins in the Overwatch game design team designing a flying hero with abilities that "felt like a fighter pilot", such as lock-on missiles and targeting systems. During Juno's development process, the narrative team was set on a support hero, so they thought about how they could make that goal mesh with the character's gameplay kit shared by the game design team. Also delving into how to make the character a "fighter pilot or space-ranger-style hero", the narrative team considered if extraterrestrial aliens could exist in the Overwatch universe, which led concept artist Daryl Tan to draft a flying character equipped in a space suit.

The narrative developers concluded that this character could be a human from a Martian colony, since within the Overwatch universe humanity had already colonized the moon. As a result, Juno was conceptualized as a "Martian" returning to Earth. In an interview with Polygon, narrative designer Joshi Zhang stated that Juno's upbringing on Mars sparks a nervous, though eager curiosity, with the narrative team landing on "a little quirky, a little anxious, very curious" personality for her, along with a wide emotional range. The back-and-forth collaboration between the art and narrative teams was a development style previously used for other characters, such as Winston.

=== Design ===
Juno is a young, slim Asian woman with brown eyes. Her hair is blue in a bob cut that frames her face, with various pink highlights through. Juno's outfit consists of a blue form-fitting space suit with red highlights and a zipped-up orange jacket atop it, while gray gloves cover her hands and a transparent, blue-tinted, fish bowl-like helmet adorns her head. Her boots are white with orange highlights, oversized to accommodate propulsion units around the soles. She has matching white armor on her back and lower arms, with wing-like attachments protruding from the back armor. Like other Overwatch characters, Juno received skins – unlockable cosmetic items to change her in-game appearance. Of particular note, during one of the game's seasonal events, she received a skin to resemble the character Ochaco Uraraka from the anime My Hero Academia, a decision that received praise due to how similar the two characters were in terms of design.

The development team teased Juno's reveal at BlizzCon 2023, ten months before her release, notably earlier in the design process than with previous new characters. At the time, they had not yet finalized her gameplay kit or visual design. According to art director Dion Rogers, the latter "felt too on-the-nose as an astronaut". As a result, the armor pieces in her early designs were removed to make her character silhouette resemble other flying characters in the game less. Rogers explained that her final look was inspired by considering what Juno would really wear on Mars if she were to walk on its surface. Zhang also cited lore reasons for the art design changes, explaining that "her suit was created by her mom as an iterative thing that they worked together on". When creating her, particular attention was also put on her expressions and personality, wanting to illustrate her as terrified and overwhelmed to be on Earth, but also very curious. Her manner of speech was also made more unique from other characters, with the writing team having her avoid contractions to emphasize that she came from an environment of professional scientists, and build an atmosphere of "feeling different".

== Appearances ==
Juno Teo Minh is a medic introduced in the 2023 first-person shooter Overwatch. A Vietnamese woman born on Mars, she is a descendant of Khiem Van Minh and Jiayi Teo, scientists who left earth to terraform the planet for future inhabitants, and is the only child of said colony. She was raised collectively by the colony's residents along with her parents, who helped her to build her own suit and tools. Around the time of a robot uprising on Earth known as the Omnic War prior to the events of Overwatch, the colony lost contact with Earth. When supplies began running low, the colony built a shuttle for Juno to return to Earth and find help from the scientist Mei, who was a close friend of her mother Jiayi. Seeing herself as a godmother for Juno, Mei takes care of her while she is on Earth.

Outside of Overwatch, Juno also appears in the updated dating sim game Loverwatch, exclusive to Chinese regions. In supplemental media for the Overwatch franchise, she appeared in the comic Red Promise, which detailed her backstory. It was later followed by a 3D animated short, Control, which illustrated more of her backstory and character.

=== Gameplay ===
In Overwatch, Juno is classified as a "Support"-class character, meant to provide aid for her team. Her primary weapon is the "Mediblaster", a laser pistol that harms foes but can also heal allies if she shoots them. She additionally has a passive ability called "Martian Overboots", which not only make her hover over the ground but also allow her to double jump as well as glide while airborne. When designing her gameplay, the development team wanted to lean into the fantasy of playing as a "fighter pilot-type astronaut hero", without overshadowing the abilities of similar characters in the game's Support-class such as Lúcio.

In addition she has two abilities that require activation, though have a "cooldown" period after use and are unable to be used again during that duration. The first, "Pulsar Torpedoes", fires a group of homing projectiles which are capable of targeting multiple combatants at once; similar to the Mediblaster, the torpedoes damage enemies and heal teammates. Meanwhile, her "Hyper Ring" ability generates a large energy ring that provides a temporary speed boost for allies that run through it. Lastly, "Glide Boost" propels her forward in a horizontal path. Lastly her Ultimate ability, "Orbital Ray", needs to be charged before use. The ability charges slowly during the course of gameplay, and can be charged faster through damage dealt to the enemy team or healing provided to allies. Once full, the ability can be activated to create a vertical area of effect ray that heal allies within its range and increase their damage.

== Promotion and reception ==
Blizzard teased Juno at BlizzCon 2023, then codenamed "Space Ranger", and described her as a mobile hero focused on vertical movement. Her character was further teased with various map changes at the start of the game's eleventh season. She was revealed midway through the season with an open weekend playtest in July 2024, before being fully added to the game the following month. In a collaboration with Disc City Entertainment Co., select cafes in Japan served dishes inspired by the character and others in the Overwatch cast. In 2026, cards featuring Juno were included in Chinese Burger King meals as part of a cross-promotion between the company and Loverwatch.

Juno was well received upon debut. Dashiell Wood of TechRadar called her the most adorable character they had introduced into the game at that point, praising her gameplay but also her design aesthetic. In particular he emphasized how her spacesuit not only illustrated her origins but helped her stand out among the cast, down to the glow of her space helmet looking like a bubble from a distance. Meanwhile, during the character's playtest debut, Overwatch experienced server issues and downtime, which Dot Esports's Scott Duwe attributed to Juno's popularity as a larger number of players wanted to try the character than Blizzard had anticipated. Her popularity persisted in the months after her release, where she remained the most-selected character by players even after Blizzard adjusted her gameplay to do less damage.

Robin Bea of Inverse observed that while she was immediately popular, some strong criticisms were voiced in regards to concerns in her gameplay being overpowered, but also in terms of her character design. In particular, Juno's "light skin, enormous eyes, and a round nose" were called out as a recurring example of whitewashing by Blizzard's design team that was observed in much of the game's East Asian cast. In addition, her design was accused of being too similar to other female characters in the game, and concerns were also raised that it leaned too heavily towards a sexualized design, particularly emphasized by her skin-tight space suit.

=== Analysis of gameplay ===
In terms of gameplay, video game writers praised Juno for her ability to reward players for having sound game sense. Jeremy Gan in an article for Dexerto described her as the best designed character added to the game since its 2023 release. Elaborating, he felt each character introduced since the game's release had either been under or overpowered; by comparison, he saw the greatest part of Juno's design being that "she does everything fairly". In particular, he emphasized her lack of a "bailout button" skill that had become common to Support-class characters in Overwatch, such as Baptiste's "Immortality Field". He felt such abilities made those characters unbearable to play against, as they provided a quick escape from being punished for poor planning. Meanwhile, Juno's utility required the player to be more aware of her positioning and team, and instead of fundamentally changing the game, rewarded good decision making.

These sentiments were echoed by Tyler Colp of PC Gamer who saw her as the most strategically pleasing character in the game due to how her abilities required thought and setup to use properly. Colp emphasized her high mobility and the synergy of her skills, particularly in that she was one of the few characters since the game's release to be able to increase her team's movement speed and how that encouraged synergy with her other skills. He particularly praised the thought put into her Orbital Ray, noting the series had often struggled with balancing Ultimate abilities and writing that it could be a good path to follow for future characters, deviating away from the "'I win' button" feel of some Ultimates. Colp closed by stating that all together, she felt like a "brilliant blend of strategy and payoff" that made him miss when the game was "slow enough to have heroes who could change the course of a match by making a series of smart decisions to set their team".
