= Apetamin =

Appetite stimulant

Apetamin is a potentially dangerous figure-augmentation product. It is a syrup containing cyproheptadine, the amino acid lysine, and some vitamins.

Cyproheptadine, the active ingredient, is an antihistamine and a hepatotoxin that has many effects on the body, including increased appetite, fatigue, and drowsiness. Apetamin has not been approved by the US Food and Drug Administration or the UK Medicines and Healthcare products Regulatory Agency. It is illegal to sell apetamin in most countries, including the United States. It is heavily promoted and illegally sold on social media.
