= Baizhu (Genshin Impact) =

Fictional character in a video game

- Genshin Impact character
- Promotional artwork for Baizhu, with Changsheng wrapped loosely around his neck
- First game: Genshin Impact (2020)
- Voiced by: English: Sean Durrie (Baizhu); Xanthe Huynh (Changsheng); Chinese: Qin Qiege (Baizhu); Wang Xiaotong (Changsheng); Japanese: Kōji Yusa (Baizhu); Yui Shōji (Changsheng); Korean: Lee Ho-san (Baizhu); Jang Mi (Changsheng)

In-universe information
- Weapon: Catalyst
- Home: Liyue
- Element: Dendro

Baizhu (Chinese: 白术; pinyin: Báizhú) is a fictional character in the video game Genshin Impact, developed by miHoYo. He first appeared in the game's public release in 2020 and officially became a playable character in May 2023. Baizhu is frequently accompanied by a white snake familiar named Changsheng (长生; Chángshēng; 'longevity'). Baizhu and Changsheng are both from Liyue, a region in the game inspired by China. Baizhu's design incorporates numerous elements of Chinese culture. His Chinese name is identical to that of a traditional Chinese medicinal herb, while his clothing and attack animations incorporate concepts from traditional Chinese medicine, traditional patterns, and the clothing of China's ethnic minority groups. His mythological background also draws upon figures from Buddhism and Chinese folklore.

In the game's story, Baizhu inherits an ancient contract with Changsheng that allows him to save the lives of others at the cost of consuming his own lifespan. He seeks to break this curse of exchanging one life for another, reflecting both his compassion as a physician and his desire for an ordinary, happy life. Baizhu's character design, cultural influences, and voice acting received positive responses from players, although his sales performance fell short of expectations due in part to the concurrent release of one of miHoYo's other games, Honkai: Star Rail.

== Design and voice acting ==
Baizhu shares his Chinese name with Atractylodes macrocephala, a medicinal herb used in traditional Chinese medicine, which is for multiple medicinal purposes, especially those concerning spleen issues and other gastrointestinal issues. His design also incorporates several layers of Chinese cultural symbolism. His hairstyle, known as the "snake-ear braid", derives from an ancient Chinese hairstyle in which snakelike locks of hair hung from beside the ears down to the chest. The shoulders of his cape feature modified meander and ruyi patterns, interspersed with four-leaf motifs, while snake patterns appear on the streamers of his robe. His upper-body clothing combines modified forms of the magua and the short garments traditionally worn by the Miao people. Baizhu wears a golden, vertically needle-shaped bracer on his right arm, directly inspired by the "mirror needle" or "jing needle" among the nine needles of traditional Chinese medicine, while ten Buddhist prayer beads hang from his left wrist. His lower-body design includes a snake-shaped jade ornament hanging from his waistband and round coins with square holes attached to his ankles. Baizhu's attack animations combine elements of Chinese medicine and martial arts. His use of pressure-point strikes draws upon acupuncture point therapy in Chinese medicine while also incorporating martial-arts techniques for striking pressure points. In combat, after striking specific parts of an enemy's body, Baizhu pushes the opponent away with his palm, creating a forceful visual impact. His mythological symbolism draws upon imagery associated with Green Tara in Buddhism. The teardrop-style ornament at his waist corresponds to the legend that Green Tara was born from the tears of the bodhisattva Guanyin, while Baizhu's role as a physician is closely connected to Green Tara's religious association with dispelling karmic obstacles, illness and suffering. Changsheng's design, meanwhile, resembles Bai Suzhen from the Chinese folk tale The Legend of the White Snake.

Baizhu is voiced in Chinese by Qin Qiege, in English by Sean Durrie, in Japanese by Kōji Yusa, and in Korean by Lee Ho-san. Changsheng is voiced by Wang Xiaotong, Xanthe Huynh, Yui Shōji, and Jang Mi in those languages respectively.

== Appearances ==
Changsheng was originally known as the Herblord, an adeptus who lived in Chenyu Vale, a region in northern Liyue. After an accident deprived her of most of her adeptal power, she entered into a contract with a physician seeking the secrets of medicine. The contract allowed Changsheng's master to draw upon some of her power to absorb the illnesses of others. Once absorbed, however, the illnesses could not be transferred elsewhere, causing the contract holder's health to gradually deteriorate. The physician later passed the contract (and thus, Changsheng) onto his disciple, beginning a tradition in which it was handed down from master to apprentice across generations. When Baizhu's master entrusted Changsheng to him, he also posed Baizhu a challenge: Baizhu was to find a way to resolve the issue of exchanging one life for another. As the contract's current holder, Baizhu intends to invoke Changsheng's mysterious power should someone truly worth saving ever appear. However, he does not intend to pass this power onto another generation, because many regard it as cursed and contrary to the natural order of things.

Baizhu first appears in the game during a visit to Liyue by the game's protagonist, the Traveler. The Traveler and their guide Paimon accompany their friend Zhongli to Bubu Pharmacy, where Baizhu works, to purchase some incense, but Qiqi (a zombie girl who works under Baizhu) demands milk from a "cocogoat" in exchange. Baizhu then returns and initially asks the exorbitant price of three million Mora (Teyvat's currency) for the incense. Another one of the Traveler's friends, Tartaglia, arrives soon afterward, establishes a business partnership with Bubu Pharmacy, and promises to provide a regular supply of coconut milk for Qiqi, who enjoys drinking it. Baizhu consequently relents and sells the incense to the group for 2.99 million Mora.

In Baizhu's Story Quest, a boy named Ayu visits Bubu Pharmacy seeking treatment for his father Jialiang's memory loss, but Jialiang goes missing in Liyue Harbor. After learning that Ayu's mother, Jiangli, is his senior fellow disciple, Baizhu decides to help find him. Working together with funeral director Hu Tao (whose great-uncle was Baizhu's master), the group locates Jialiang and discovers that his body contains god remains. (Note: God remains are traces left behind in Teyvat after the defeat of a god in combat. They may later cause disturbances and threaten the peace.) Their investigation reveals that Jiangli had refined the god remains into a poison to suppress her husband's psychological illness and control his mind, but prolonged exposure to it has also left her close to death. To save Jiangli, who only has three days left to live, Jialiang chooses to sacrifice himself. After smashing the vial containing the poison, he asks Baizhu to kill him. Though reluctant, Baizhu recognized Jialiang's resolve and removes the god remains from his body, causing him to collapse. However, Baizhu had already prepared an elixir in advance, which transforms Jialiang into an undead creature similar to Qiqi and allows him to continue "living". Baizhu subsequently explains that he inherited the contract with Changsheng, which enables him to exchange his own lifespan for those of others, but that every previous contract holder died young. He hopes to break this curse while also being unwilling to lose Changsheng, leading to his fixation on immortality. Watching Ayu's family reunite and enjoy an ordinary happy moment, Baizhu reflects that it is precisely such small joys that make people want to continue living.

=== Gameplay ===
Baizhu is a five-star rarity Dendro user who uses a catalyst in combat. His Normal Attack performs up to four consecutive attacks which deal Dendro damage. His Elemental Skill produces a Gossamer Sprite which attacks any nearby enemies; after it deals three attacks or if there are no nearby enemies, the Gossmer Sprite returns and heals all party members based on Baizhu's maximum hit points. His Elemental Burst causes him to enter a state known as Pulsing Clarity, creating a shield that absorbs Dendro damage. A new shield will be generated every two-and-a-half seconds while in this state. The shield also heals the active character based on Baizhu's maximum hit points and attacks enemies.

== Promotion ==
Baizhu was first introduced in version 1.0 of the game as a non-player character on September 28, 2020. On February 24, 2023, miHoYo released his character artwork an profile, announcing he would become playable in the future. On April 26, miHoYo released Baizhu's character teaser, "Baizhu: An Elusive Creative", which showed him drawing upon his extensive knowledge of herbal medicine to prepare prescriptions for his patients. This was followed on May 1 by his character demo, "Curing the Root Cause", which showcased his combat abilities. Baizhu was released as a playable character on May 2. alongside his signature weapon "Jadefall's Splendor" and a dedicated Story Quest.

== Reception ==
Baizhu was generally well received. Players expressed their love for the character by means of cosplay and other fan works. The announcement during miHoYo's promotional livestream that Baizhu would soon become playable attracted considerable attention from players in Japan, with the official announcement on Twitter receiving numerous comments from excited players. However, Baizhu was released as a playable character at around the same time as miHoYo released a new game, Honkai: Star Rail as part of their Honkai series. Due to this, Baizhu's sales fell below expectations, even ranking below those of Cyno and the controversial Dehya.

=== Characterization ===
Li Zhenzhao of Guangdong University of Foreign Studies stated that Baizhu's upper-body clothing displays a distinctive beauty by blending traditional Chinese dress with exotic influences, while the incorporation of imagery associated with Green tara gives him a religious quality and compliments his feminine characterization. A writer for Dengeki Online wrote that they were deeply captivated by Baizhu's naturally falling hair on one side, the combination of a bun and braid at the back of his head, his gentle, downturned eyes, and the ornament beside his half-rimmed glasses. Combined with Yusa's voice (which they said was elegant and mature), these features made the writer feel as though their own lifespan had been extended. Ryan Clouse of The Nerd Stash regarded Baizhu as the sexiest male character in the game, describing him as possessing a beautiful hairstyle and a personality that combined intelligence with kindness. Clouse considered his excellent overall design to be a perfect combination, with his glasses serving as the finishing touch that made him even more attractive. However, because Baizhu's appearance resembles that of the antagonistic Fatui Harbinger, Pantalone, some players previously speculated about a possible relationship between the two characters.

Before Baizhu's official release, Jess Reyes of Inverse likened him to a mad scientist, describing him as an easygoing but somewhat mischievous person. Reyes argued that his suspicious motives and characterization were among the reasons why fans were eagerly anticipating his debut as a playable character. Dengeki Online similarly stated that Baizhu initially gave the impression of being "somewhat suspicious, with his true intentions impossible to discern". Even influential figures in Liyue suspected him of harboring ulterior motives, while Paimon also believed that he appeared to be plotting something. However, the process of helping a young boy treat his father's illness during his Story Quest unexpectedly revealed his connections with his master and Hu Tao, as well as his deep bond with Changsheng.

=== Gameplay ===
Li stated that Baizhu's fluidly-connected attack animations not only create visual tension, but also reinforce his characterization as a physician. Overall, the symbolism incorporated into Baizhu's clothing reflects his gentle and responsible nature, as well as his refusal to show mercy towards his enemies. Dengeki Online noted that Baizhu's abilities can restore the health of the entire party, greatly reducing the risk of its members being defeated. The writer also found it impossible to resist the animation in which Baizhu adjusts his glasses after using his Normal Attack, the gentle expression with which he gazes at Changsheng during one of his idle animations, and his softly delivered warning which triggers when he opens a treasure chest, where he states that the treasure chest is not very clean. His only drawback was that he coughs while sprinting or during his idle animations, inevitably causing concern for his health. Following the version 3.6 update, players were able to freely enter one of the rooms in Bubu Pharmacy. As the room remained permanently accessible, Hajrudin Krdzic of Game Rant wrote that the feature was praised by many players, some of whom compared it with Alhaitham's room, which could only be entered during the game's story.

Conversely, Bruno Yonezawa of Screen Rant described Baizhu's gameplay as versatile, but argued that he performed unsatisfactorily in each of his roles. He therefore recommended that players instead invest in characters who provide stronger healing and are easier to obtain. Raddie Perez of TheGamer noted that although Baizhu's Elemental Skill restores health, its healing takes time to activate, meaning players must still evade enemy attacks. The shields generated by his Elemental Burst also break easily and last only briefly, so Perez argued that players should not regard him as a true shielder.
