= Whitewashing (beauty) =

Lightening of people's skin tones in media

Whitewashing in beauty is a term used to describe the alteration of the appearance of non-white people in fashion, digital photography, mass media, marketing, and advertising to make them appear whiter. Whitewashing can include altering skin tone through digital retouching or skin-whitening products, changing hair texture through chemical treatments to conform to beauty standards associated with Eurocentric ideals of straight hair, or modifying physical features. Additionally, plastic surgery can be used to alter features to make them appear more European, such as through double eyelid surgery.

Whitewashing has been discussed in relation to film, photography, advertising, and other forms of media for many years. Whitewashing in Hollywood has been criticized by some commentators in relation to limited diversity in the industry. Advertising companies often airbrush their models to make them appear to have lighter skin, as seen in the L'Oréal campaign with Beyoncé in 2008.

Whitewashing can also occur when a film or television series based on a book or other source rewrites a non-white role as white and casts a white actor in the role. This should not be confused with blackface, in which a person who is not Black attempts to portray a darker skin tone using makeup or digital editing. This type of whitewashing has been associated with the film industry and has been an issue since the beginning of Hollywood. More people of color have been represented in the industry in recent years, although critics argue that whitewashing continues to affect representation and may influence the self-image of young children from marginalized racial groups.

Cultural whitewashing is also common in the media, in which a culture's traditions are altered to conform to Western stereotypes, such as in the popular film Step Up.

== Japan ==
The Japanese term bihaku refers to skin-whitening products. A 1997 study valued the face-whitening market at approximately ¥160 billion.

== Popular examples ==
=== Advertising ===
A clear example of beauty whitewashing is a L'Oréal advertisement that featured Beyoncé Knowles. It was published in Elle and Essence magazines. Knowles' skin was digitally retouched to appear lighter in Elle than in Essence, which is targeted at African American women. This brought the company under sustained criticism. Other examples include celebrities such as Halle Berry, Brandy, Mariah Carey, Rihanna, Freida Pinto, Jennifer Lopez, Tyra Banks, Leona Lewis, Jennifer Hudson, Gabourey Sidibe, and Queen Latifah, whose skin was lightened during the editing of promotional photoshoots. In 2014, Vanity Fair was accused of lightening Lupita Nyong'o's skin in the "Vanities" section after red carpet photos differed markedly from those published in the magazine.

The photo- and video-sharing app Snapchat also attracted public criticism in 2016 for potential whitewashing in its photo filters. A particular focus of this criticism was the use of words such as "beautify" and "pretty" to describe the skin-lightening filters.

=== Film ===
In 2017, Rupert Sanders' Hollywood adaptation of the 1995 Japanese manga Ghost in the Shell came under scrutiny for casting a white actress, Scarlett Johansson, to play the Japanese protagonist. Although this was not physical whitewashing through skin whitening or hair relaxing, it is still considered whitewashing because a white actress was cast instead of a Japanese actress, and the role was rewritten for a white actress.

In the 2014 film Aloha, directed by Cameron Crowe, Emma Stone, a white actress, was cast as Captain Allison Ng, a woman who was partially Hawaiian. Similar to Ghost in the Shell, a white actress was cast in place of an actress of color, effectively whitewashing the role and the film itself.

In the Harry Potter film series, the minor character Lavender Brown was originally played by a Black actress. She was later replaced by Jessie Cave, a white actress.

Whitewashing in films is commonly identified when a non-white role is cast by a white actor. An example that dates back to 2007 but continued to receive heavy criticism in 2022 is the biographical film A Mighty Heart, directed by Michael Winterbottom. In this film, Angelina Jolie, who is white, played Mariane Pearl, who is of French and Black descent. Questions arose about why a Black actress was not cast to portray the real-life Mariane Pearl. A white actress portraying a Black woman in a biographical film is considered an example of whitewashing.

Furthermore, since the 1970s, some Greek films have promoted the idea of whitewashing. In some Greek films, people of African descent are portrayed as inferior to their white counterparts because they are depicted as less beautiful, less intelligent, and less European. In some of these films, people of African descent are mocked, with such portrayals being dismissed as "just a joke" by some in the Greek film industry.

=== Public figures ===
Typically, women primarily use products to lighten their skin, but men also use them in many cases. Former professional baseball star Sammy Sosa admitted to using skin bleaching cream in an interview with Primer Impacto of the Univision Spanish-language network, saying: "It's a bleaching cream that I apply before going to bed and whitens my skin some.… It's a cream that I have, that I use to soften [my skin], but has bleached me some. I'm not racist, I live my life happily."

Political figures have also been associated with whitewashing beauty standards. Former Louisiana Governor Bobby Jindal's 2008 portrait depicted him with lighter skin than his natural complexion. Bobby Jindal is of Indian descent, yet he appears white in the portrait. Many speculated that his portrait was painted to appeal to European beauty standards, particularly in a political context. His official political portrait sparked controversy on social media platforms in 2015, with users alleging that it did not resemble his actual appearance because it depicted him with a much lighter skin tone. Bobby Jindal has been noted for using a different name in his political career. His first name is Piyush, but he goes by the name Bobby.

== Effects ==
The reasons for altering skin tone in advertisements are believed to be primarily marketing-related, specifically to appeal to whiter ethnic groups, which are generally the primary target audiences in consumer-driven markets such as Europe and the United States. Skin tone manipulation can also reflect the implicit beauty standards or ideals that marketers perpetuate. Beauty whitewashing has been criticized for distorting perceptions of reality, promoting a distorted sense of beauty, and negatively affecting women, children, and communities alike.

These Eurocentric ideals are imposed on people of color, creating hierarchies within their own communities. Ultimately, whitewashing creates social tension not only between Black and White communities but also between groups that more closely resemble established beauty standards, such as lighter-skinned African Americans, and those that do not, including darker-skinned African Americans. This phenomenon can apply to both men and women of color.

According to a 2016 undergraduate paper by Kai Nelson, whitewashing has a negative impact on children in African American communities. The media does not always present accurate portrayals of the racial groups it depicts, resulting in diminished self-confidence among African American children. Nelson states that children may negatively interpret the alteration of skin color in the beauty industry and develop the view that they are "unattractive" and "undesirable". Because of the lack of Black role models in popular media, children may come to see the White community as the "default race".

In the Journal of Black Studies, Ronald Hall argues that whitewashing has caused people of color to develop a "bleaching syndrome," which involves internalizing a preference for the ideals of the dominant, or White, culture. This results in people of color developing contempt for dark skin because it is regarded as an obstacle to assimilation. However, despite adopting white cultural values, people of color are still barred from full assimilation.

== See also ==
- Discrimination based on skin color
- Whitewashing in film
