= List of Live Rescue episodes =

The following is a list of Live Rescue episodes

As of January 15, 2021, 67 episodes of Live Rescue have aired.

== Series overview ==
Season	Episodes	Originally released	
Season	Episodes	First released	Last released
1	16	April 22, 2019	August 19, 2019
2	22	September 23, 2019	March 9, 2020
3	29	August 21, 2020	January 15, 2021

== Episodes ==
=== Season 1 (2019) ===
No.	Title	Original release date	Viewers (millions)	18-49 rating
1	"04.22.19"	April 22, 2019	1.393	0.4
2	"04.29.19"	April 29, 2019	1.040	0.3
3	"05.06.19"	May 6, 2019	1.053	0.3
4	"05.09.19"	May 9, 2019	1.070	0.3
5	"05.13.19"	May 13, 2019	1.041	0.3
6	"05.20.19"	May 20, 2019	0.724	0.20
7	"06.03.19"	June 3, 2019	1.009	0.3
8	"06.10.19"	June 10, 2019	0.846	0.21
9	"06.17.19"	June 17, 2019	1.114	0.3
10	"06.24.19"	June 24, 2019	1.029	0.3
11	"07.18.19"	July 18, 2019	1.020	0.3
12	"07.25.19"	July 25, 2019	0.859	0.18
13	"08.01.19"	August 1, 2019	1.010	0.20
14	"08.05.19"	August 5, 2019	1.014	0.23
15	"08.12.19"	August 12, 2019	0.867	0.22
16	"08.19.19"	August 19, 2019	0.953	0.23

=== Season 2 (2019–20) ===
No.	Title	Original release date	Viewers (millions)	18-49 rating
1	"09.23.19"	September 23, 2019	0.681	0.20
Guest analysts: Sgt. Sean "Sticks" Larkin of the Tulsa Oklahoma Police Department Gang Unit and Halani Lobdell, Battalion Chief with the DeKalb County Fire and Rescue.
2	"09.30.19"	September 30, 2019	0.715	0.18
Guest analysts: Sgt. Sean "Sticks" Larkin of the Tulsa Oklahoma Police Department Gang Unit and Halani Lobdell, Battalion Chief with the DeKalb County Fire and Rescue.
3	"10.07.19"	October 7, 2019	0.683	0.16
Guest analysts: Sgt. Sean "Sticks" Larkin of the Tulsa Oklahoma Police Department Gang Unit and Halani Lobdell, Battalion Chief with the DeKalb County Fire and Rescue.
4	"10.14.19"	October 14, 2019	0.695	0.17
Guest analysts: Sgt. Sean "Sticks" Larkin of the Tulsa Oklahoma Police Department Gang Unit and Garon Patrick Mosby, Command Staff Officer & Public Information Officer with the St. Louis Fire Department.
5	"10.21.19"	October 21, 2019	0.740	0.17
Guest analysts: Sgt. Sean "Sticks" Larkin of the Tulsa Oklahoma Police Department Gang Unit and Garon Patrick Mosby, Command Staff Officer & Public Information Officer with the St. Louis Fire Department.
6	"10.28.19"	October 28, 2019	0.623	0.17
Guest analysts: Battalion Chief Jason Serrano of the San Bernardino County Fire Department and Garon Patrick Mosby, Command Staff Officer & Public Information Officer with the St. Louis Fire Department.
7	"11.04.19"	November 4, 2019	0.677	0.17
Guest analysts: Paramedic Dan Flynn of the New Orleans Emergency Medical Services and Garon Patrick Mosby, Command Staff Officer & Public Information Officer with the St. Louis Fire Department.
8	"11.11.19"	November 11, 2019	0.661	0.14
Guest analysts: Paramedic Dan Flynn of the New Orleans Emergency Medical Services and Garon Patrick Mosby, Command Staff Officer & Public Information Officer with the St. Louis Fire Department.
9	"11.18.19"	November 18, 2019	0.673	0.17
Guest analysts: Paramedic Dan Flynn of the New Orleans Emergency Medical Services and Garon Patrick Mosby, Command Staff Officer & Public Information Officer with the St. Louis Fire Department.
10	"11.25.19"	November 25, 2019	0.858	0.20
Guest analysts: Paramedic Dan Flynn of the New Orleans Emergency Medical Services and Garon Patrick Mosby, Command Staff Officer & Public Information Officer with the St. Louis Fire Department.
11	"12.09.19"	December 9, 2019	0.841	0.22
Guest analysts: Paramedic Dan Flynn of the New Orleans Emergency Medical Services, Garon Patrick Mosby, Command Staff Officer & Public Information Officer with the St. Louis Fire Department and Captain Ryan Starling of the San Bernardino County Fire Department.
12	"12.16.19"	December 16, 2019	0.816	0.22
Guest analysts: Paramedic Dan Flynn of the New Orleans Emergency Medical Services and Garon Patrick Mosby, Command Staff Officer & Public Information Officer with the St. Louis Fire Department.
N–A	"Top 10 Moments"	December 23, 2019	0.896	0.27
A look back at the top 10 moments of the past year of Live Rescue.
13	"01.06.20"	January 6, 2020	1.099	0.25
Guest analysts: Paramedic Dan Flynn of the New Orleans Emergency Medical Services and Garon Patrick Mosby, Command Staff Officer & Public Information Officer with the St. Louis Fire Department.
14	"01.13.20"	January 13, 2020	0.731	0.16
Guest analysts: Paramedic Dan Flynn of the New Orleans Emergency Medical Services and Garon Patrick Mosby, Command Staff Officer & Public Information Officer with the St. Louis Fire Department.
15	"01.20.20"	January 20, 2020	1.070	0.30
Guest analysts: Paramedic Dan Flynn of the New Orleans Emergency Medical Services and Garon Patrick Mosby, Command Staff Officer & Public Information Officer with the St. Louis Fire Department.
16	"01.27.20"	January 27, 2020	0.929	0.25
Guest analysts: Paramedic Dan Flynn of the New Orleans Emergency Medical Services and Garon Patrick Mosby, Command Staff Officer & Public Information Officer with the St. Louis Fire Department.
17	"02.03.20"	February 3, 2020	0.743	0.20
Guest analysts: Paramedic Dan Flynn of the New Orleans Emergency Medical Services and Garon Patrick Mosby, Command Staff Officer & Public Information Officer with the St. Louis Fire Department.
18	"02.10.20"	February 10, 2020	0.737	0.21
Guest analysts: Paramedic Dan Flynn of the New Orleans Emergency Medical Services and Garon Patrick Mosby, Command Staff Officer & Public Information Officer with the St. Louis Fire Department.
19	"02.17.20"	February 17, 2020	0.715	0.19
Guest analysts: Paramedic Dan Flynn of the New Orleans Emergency Medical Services and Garon Patrick Mosby, Command Staff Officer & Public Information Officer with the St. Louis Fire Department.
20	"02.24.20"	February 24, 2020	0.733	0.18
Guest analysts: Paramedic Dan Flynn of the New Orleans Emergency Medical Services and Garon Patrick Mosby, Command Staff Officer & Public Information Officer with the St. Louis Fire Department.
21	"03.02.20"	March 2, 2020	0.874	0.22
Guest analysts: Paramedic Dan Flynn of the New Orleans Emergency Medical Services and Garon Patrick Mosby, Command Staff Officer & Public Information Officer with the St. Louis Fire Department.
22	"03.09.20"	March 9, 2020	0.740	0.20
Guest analysts: Paramedic Dan Flynn of the New Orleans Emergency Medical Services and Garon Patrick Mosby, Command Staff Officer & Public Information Officer with the St. Louis Fire Department.

=== Season 3 (2020–21) ===
No.	Title	Original release date	Viewers (millions)	18–49 rating
1	"08.21.20"	August 21, 2020	0.653	0.16
2	"08.22.20"	August 22, 2020	0.590	0.12
3	"08.28.20"	August 28, 2020	0.625	0.15
4	"08.29.20"	August 29, 2020	0.504	0.10
5	"09.04.20"	September 4, 2020	0.601	0.10
6	"09.05.20"	September 5, 2020	0.447	0.08
7	"09.11.20"	September 11, 2020	0.561	0.11
8	"09.12.20"	September 12, 2020	0.487	0.08
9	"09.18.20"	September 18, 2020	0.709	0.17
10	"09.19.20"	September 19, 2020	0.602	0.14
11	"09.25.20"	September 25, 2020	0.665	0.15
12	"09.26.20"	September 26, 2020	0.519	0.10
13	"10.02.20"	October 2, 2020	0.639	0.11
14	"10.03.20"	October 3, 2020	0.555	0.10
15	"10.09.20"	October 9, 2020	0.571	0.11
16	"10.10.20"	October 10, 2020	0.595	0.11
17	"10.16.20"	October 16, 2020	0.535	0.11
18	"10.17.20"	October 17, 2020	0.517	0.09
19	"10.23.20"	October 23, 2020	0.560	0.14
20	"10.30.20"	October 30, 2020	0.598	0.16
21	"11.06.20"	November 6, 2020	0.564	0.12
22	"11.13.20"	November 13, 2020	0.617	0.15
23	"11.20.20"	November 20, 2020	0.654	0.14
24	"12.04.20"	December 4, 2020	0.757	0.17
25	"12.11.20"	December 11, 2020	0.715	0.19
26	"12.18.20"	December 18, 2020	0.606	0.13
N–A	"Top 20 Moments of 2020"	December 25, 2020	0.670	0.16
27	"01.01.20"	January 1, 2021	0.510	0.13
28	"01.08.20"	January 8, 2021	0.525	0.12
29	"01.15.20"	January 15, 2021	0.649	0.16
