= Loop recorder =

Loop recorder may refer to:

- Digital loop recorder, a type of closed-circuit television security camera
- Implantable loop recorder, a medical diagnostic device
