= Test–retest =

Test–retest or retest or may refer to:

- Test–retest reliability
- Monitoring (medicine) by performing frequent tests
- Doping retest, of an old sports doping sample using improved technology, to allow retrospective disqualification
