= Fetal monitoring =

Monitoring of a fetus may refer to:

- Regular tests done as part of prenatal care during a pregnancy
- Monitoring in childbirth
