= Invasive monitoring =

Invasive monitoring may refer to:

- Mass surveillance or Surveillance that leads to privacy breaches
- Trojan monitoring is having access to private computers (like phones, PCs, tablets, etc.). Personal data collection can happen to improve a newspaper's material (not necessarily performed by a country).
- Monitoring (medicine)
