= HerRoom =

American clothing retailer

- Company type: Private
- Industry: Apparel
- Founded: March 2000; 26 years ago
- Founder: Tomima Edmark
- Headquarters: Dallas, Texas
- Area served: Worldwide
- Products: Underwear, lingerie, swimwear, loungewear, Panties, hosiery, sportswear
- Owner: Andra Group, Inc.
- Website: www.herroom.com

HerRoom is an online lingerie and men's underwear retailer based in Dallas, Texas. It was founded and is owned by Tomima Edmark, inventor of the TopsyTail. Edmark runs both HerRoom and brother site HisRoom, through her company, the Andra Group LLP.

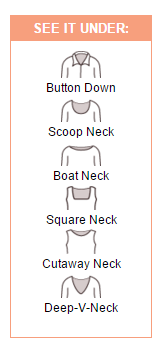
Screenshot of See It Under feature

== History ==
In 1998, Edmark began an e-commerce retail start-up The Andra Group, Inc. The initial e-commerce launch was on March 3, 2000. The men's site, HisRoom.com was launched two years later. After listening to her friends' complaints that they hated having to try on undergarments in department store fitting rooms, she wanted to let women buy bras that fit online. The HerRoom website also links to men's underwear and apparel under the HisRoom.com site.

In 2006, Edmark filed for LP status for The Andra Group.

In 2011, Edmark was awarded business method patent #8,078,498 for using back and side views as well as the front.

== Products ==
HerRoom.com currently carries 254 total brands, the men's site HisRoom.com includes 87 brands. HerRoom.com's products include: panties, swimwear, sleepwear, shapewear, hosiery, sportswear, apparel (including dresses, tops, pants, jackets and outerwear), athleisure, maternity wear, lingerie accessories used for cleavage enhancement and UGG lounge slippers.

== Features ==
In 2000, HerRoom patented and launched See It Under feature, is on the left side of individual bra item pages, and shows how that bra will show (or not) under different necklines of tops and dresses.

Universal Cup Sizing, also known as UCS Bra Sizing System, is a web-based system using an algorithm so that women can find the same fit between different lingerie brands.

Know Your Breasts Bra Finder is a multiple choice "test" that asks for age, and gives pictures of many different structural breast types to zero in on the customer's individual type, and gives results via e-mail. Tomima spent 5 years on this tool, bringing in over 500 women to measure and document.
