= New Orleans Emergency Medical Services =

Emergency services provider in Louisiana

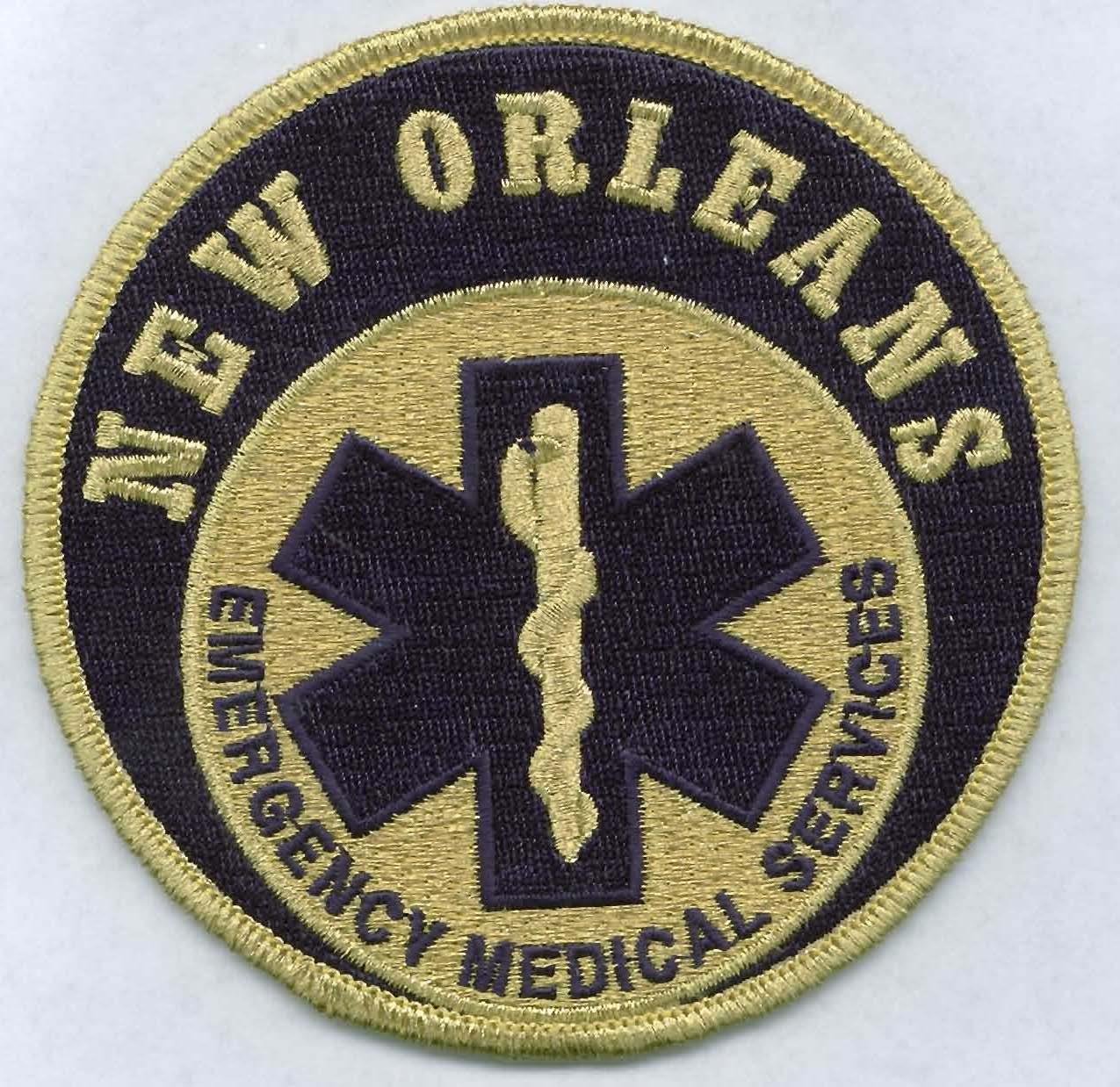

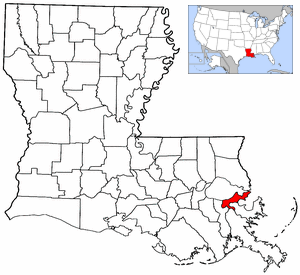
- Established: 1947
- Headquarters: New Orleans, Louisiana, United States
- Jurisdiction: City
- Dept. type: Full-time paid
- Employees: 116
- BLS or ALS: Both
- Ambulances: 68
- Fly-cars: 25
- Chief: William Salmeron, NRP
- Director: 1
- Medical director: David Rayburn M.D.
- Responses: 65,000
- Website: New Orleans EMS

New Orleans Emergency Medical Services (NOEMS or New Orleans EMS) is the primary provider of advanced life support emergency medical services to the city of New Orleans, Louisiana, United States. Unlike most other emergency medical services in the United States, New Orleans EMS operates as a third service and is not part of the New Orleans Fire Department; rather, New Orleans EMS is operated by the New Orleans Health Department and the New Orleans Office of Homeland Security and Emergency Preparedness.

== History ==
Emergency medical transportation began in the city of New Orleans with hospital-based horse-drawn ambulances in the early 1900s. Charity Hospital was one of the first hospitals in the United States to provide emergency medical transportation. The current EMS agency began in 1947 as the EMS division within the New Orleans Police Department. These ambulances were referred to as "Crash Trucks", as they mainly responded to traffic collisions. The ambulances were staffed with emergency medical technicians beginning in the 1960s, and the first paramedics started in 1979.

On July 1, 1985, the EMS division was transferred from the police department to the New Orleans Health Department. After Hurricane Katrina, the management of New Orleans EMS was changed to the New Orleans Office of Homeland Security and Emergency Preparedness. The department still resides within the health department financially, but the Office of Homeland Security and Emergency Preparedness provides administrative oversight.

== Administrative Staff ==
=== Directors and Chiefs of New Orleans EMS ===
The Directors and Chiefs of New Orleans EMS are listed as follows:

==== Medical Directors ====
Personnel	Position	Rank InsigniaRank Insignia
David Rayburn, M.D.	Medical Director	
William Salmeron, NRP	Director & Chief	
Emily Nichols, M.D.	Deputy Medical Director	
Meghan Maslanka, M.D.	Deputy Medical Director	
Omar Khattab, M.D.	Deputy Medical Director	

==== EMS Directors & Chiefs ====
Personnel	Position	Rank
David Rayburn, M.D.	EMS Director	
William Salmeron, NRP	Chief and Director of EMS	
Christopher Keller, NRP	Deputy Chief of Operations	
Cedric Palmisano, NRP	Deputy Chief of Special Operations and Logistics	
Lynn Ramagos, Jr.	Deputy Chief of Education and Training	

=== Operations Staff ===
New Orleans EMS operates on a four shift rotation schedule (A, B, C, D) and also schedules swing units as necessary. On each shift there is a shift supervisor, responsible for the operations of that shift.

==== Administration ====
Personnel	Position	Rank Insignia
Christopher Keller, NRP	Deputy Chief of Operations	
David Hutchison, NRP	Operations Administrative Major	
Brittney Lipscomb, LCSW, EMDR-T	Mental Health & Wellness Counselor	N/A

==== A Tour ====
Personnel	Position	Rank Insignia
Brooke Christy, NRP	Field Supervisor A WATCH	
Titus Carriere, NRP	Assistant Field Supervisor A WATCH	
Daniella Bruyere-Patterson, NRP	Assistant Field Supervisor A WATCH	

==== B Tour ====
Personnel	Position	Rank Insignia
Christine Guidry, NRP	Field Supervisor B WATCH	
Andrew Bouck, NRP	Assistant Field Supervisor B WATCH	

==== C Tour ====
Personnel	Position	Rank Insignia
Keeley Williams-Johnson, NRP	Field Supervisor C WATCH	
Valerie Bergeron, NRP	Assistant Field Supervisor C WATCH	
Nathan Chomsky, NRP	Assistant Field Supervisor C WATCH	

==== D Tour ====
Personnel	Position
Holly Sherman, NRP	Field Supervisor D WATCH
Nathan Mumme, NRP	Assistant Field Supervisor D WATCH
Matthew Happel, NRP	Assistant Field Supervisor D WATCH

=== Administration ===
Within the administrative staff, several positions are utilized to offer administrative support, assistance and guidance to the field personnel.

=== EMS Fellows ===
New Orleans EMS sponsors a fellowship in prehospital emergency medical services that is recognized by the American College of Emergency Physicians.

== Fleet ==
New Orleans EMS operates a fleet of Braun Liberty ambulances with Ford Super Duty cabs, painted white with two black stripes on the side. The rear of each ambulance has black-and-white reflective strips in the shape of large chevrons; some ambulances have these on their front bumpers as well. New Orleans EMS ambulances are equipped with a full Whelen Engineering Company emergency lighting system and are equipped with Whelen 295HFSC9 Dual Tone Sirens set to produce a simulated mechanical siren tone and regular electronic siren tone at the same time.

New Orleans EMS also operates a fleet of Chevrolet Tahoe and Ford PIU SUVs used as nontransporting EMS vehicles, known as "Single Paramedic Rapid Intervention" or "Sprint" units. These vehicles, use a dark blue livery with a white stripe in the shape of a Z.

== Equipment ==
All NOEMS Ambulances, ASAPs, and Sprint/Supervisor cars carry mostly the same equipment. All Ambulances are equipped with LUCAS 3 v3.1 Chest Compression Systems and LIFEPAK 35 Monitor/Defibrillators. All ASAPs and Sprint/Supervisor cars are equipped with LIFEPAK 35 Monitor/Defibrillators. All NOEMS units carry Basic Life Support and Advanced Life Support equipment as well as wound care and airway equipment. Bike Teams are equipped with BLS/ALS equipment and LIFEPAK 1000 Automated External Defibrillators.

NOEMS recently began carrying pRBC and LifeFlow blood transfusion kits on all ambulances with promising results.NOEMS also began field implementation of ultrasound and finger thoracostomy.

== Special units ==
New Orleans EMS, as the sole provider of 911 emergency medical services in the City of New Orleans, is responsible for the provision of medical care at several major events every year. To adequately cover these special events and provide medical coverage to all areas of the city, New Orleans EMS relies on several types of highly specialized response vehicles (SRVs) and highly trained emergency medical technicians and paramedics.

=== Bike Teams ===
The New Orleans EMS Bike Team consists of pairs of emergency medical technicians and paramedics who have taken the International Police Mountain Bike Association (IPMBA) course for Emergency Medical Services. The bike teams are utilized at outdoor festivals, music events, and extensively throughout the French Quarter. The bike teams carry an automated external defibrillator, cardiac monitoring equipment, and all the medications and supplies necessary for any medical or traumatic complaint.

=== Special Response Vehicles ===
New Orleans EMS operates three special response vehicles (SRVs) at various times. These vehicles consist of one modified John Deere Gator and two Alternative Support Apparatus (ASAP) Off-Road specialty vehicles. Both the Gator and the ASAP are used to extract sick or injured patients from areas with limited accessibility or large crowds. The Gator and ASAP are often used in parks, along parade routes, in the area around the Louisiana Superdome, and especially in the French Quarter where narrow streets and large crowds can make it difficult for full sized ambulances to maneuver. The SRVs are equipped with all the equipment found on a full-size ambulance and can transport a patient from the confined area to an aid station or transfer care to a waiting ambulance for transport to a hospital.

=== Emergency Medical Surge Unit ===
In February, 2010, New Orleans EMS acquired a medical ambulance bus (MAB) from Sartin Services, Inc. The MAB was named Emergency Medical Surge Unit (EMSU)-1 and has the capacity to transport 18 patients on stretchers and litters and 2 wheelchair patients, as well as six emergency medical technicians or paramedics. EMSU-1 was introduced to the public during the New Orleans Saints Super Bowl XLIV Championship Parade on February 9, 2010.

EMSU-1 saw extensive use as an on site treatment unit in support of the Rock 'n' Roll Mardi Gras Marathon, serving to greatly expand the ability and capacity of New Orleans EMS, and allowing on site delivery of acute medical care by emergency physicians and personnel.

=== Community Outreach Program ===
The Community Outreach Program of New Orleans EMS is focused on "preventative health and safety education for the citizens of Orleans Parish".

The Community Outreach Program teaches children safety and awareness through the T.A.S.K (Teaching Awareness and Safety to Kids) in child care centers, schools, and community centers. The Community Outreach Program is developing a program to target senior citizens and those with limited mobility and provide education and resources regarding environmental modification and fall prevention. Emergency medical technicians and paramedics with New Orleans EMS also mentor local students and teach public cardiopulmonary resuscitation and first aid classes.

== In popular culture ==
New Orleans EMS is heavily featured in the A&E reality television series Nightwatch, which follows New Orleans EMS paramedics on medical emergency calls during the night shift.
