= Physio-Control =

American medical equipment company

Physio-Control Inc.
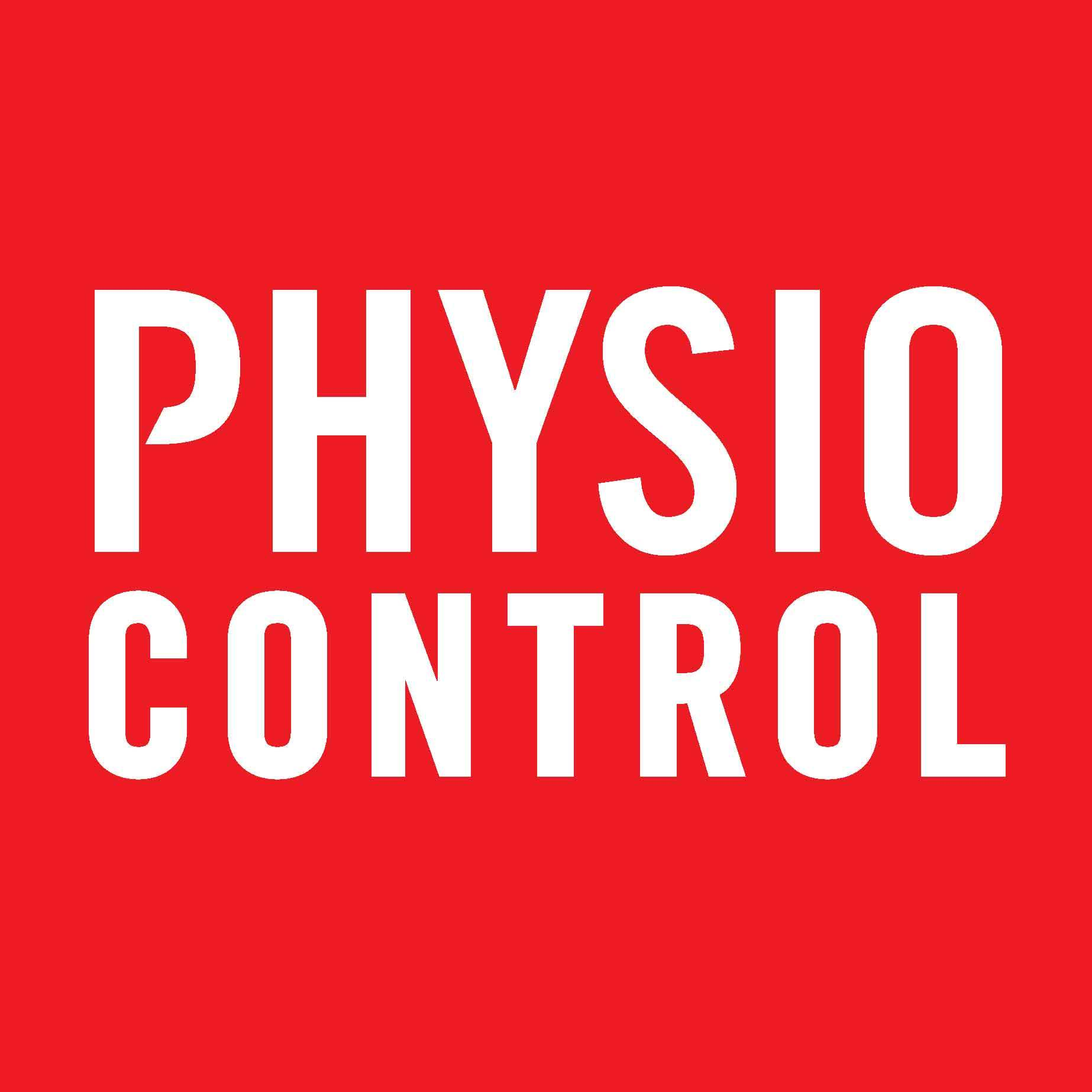
- Logo circa 2008
- Formerly: Physio-Control Corporation Medtronic Physio-Control Medtronic Emergency Response Systems
- Industry: Medical equipment
- Founded: 1955
- Founder: Dr. Karl William Edmark
- Headquarters: Redmond, Washington, U.S.
- Key people: Anne Mullally, GM and VP
- Products: Medical equipment for use in prehospital, hospital emergency and military settings in treatment of cardiac emergencies
- Parent: Stryker Corporation
- Website: www.physio-control.com

Physio-Control was founded in 1955 by Dr. Karl William Edmark as a pioneering company in the field of portable defibrillation. Physio-Control manufactures emergency defibrillation and automated cardiopulmonary resuscitation (CPR) equipment. The company was most recently acquired in 2016 by Stryker Corporation and is now part of Stryker's Emergency Care division.

== History ==
In 1955, Dr. Karl William Edmark created The Physio-Control Co. to sell his first patient monitor, which simply triggered a light whenever a patient's heart beat, and set off an alarm when a heartbeat is no longer detected. His device was patented as a "Heartbeat Indicator". After moving to Seattle, he developed the first DC defibrillator. Medical defibrillators at the time used alternating current which caused patients to spasm violently because of the high voltage. The DC defibrillator allowed surgeons to administer a more-controlled, low-voltage shock that restored the heartbeat without causing additional trauma.

In 1968, Physio-Control introduced the Lifepak 33 at the annual American Heart Association meeting in November 1968. The idea for the first Lifepak came after Physio-Control learned that Zenith Corp. was developing a 56-pound monitor/defibrillator that was bulky, however portable. With a total weight of 34 pounds, the Lifepak 33 was the lightest defibrillator available at the time. Customers included the United States Navy, who installed Lifepak 33s on both Air Force One and Air Force Two.

In 1971, Physio-Control went public and was then acquired by Eli Lilly and Company in 1980 in a stock deal worth about $145 million, returning $170,000 for every $1,000 the original investors had put into the company in 1966.

In 1992, Physio-Control voluntarily shut down production of its defibrillators and patient monitors after a review by the U.S. Food and Drug Administration found the company had failed to follow “good manufacturing practices,” including inadequate failure investigations, not properly inspecting critical components of its products, and failing to adequately document manufacturing and testing procedures in writing.

In July 1994, Physio-Control was sold to Bain Capital Corp., a Boston investment group, for $23.3 million. Steve Pagliuca, managing director at Bain Capital, was named chairman of Physio-Control.

In 1998, Physio-Control was acquired by Medtronic for $538 million in 1998, and operated as a wholly owned subsidiary named Medtronic Physio-Control. The company was later renamed to Medtronic Emergency Response Systems in 2004.

In 2003, Medtronic Physio-Control announced the launch of the LUCAS CPR device, a mechanical compression device driven pneumatically via an compressed air cylinder. It was able to provide more consistent and effective compression over longer spans than first responders, and has now become an essential part of many ambulance kits.

In 2006, Medtronic announced a spin-off of Physio-Control, however the company was still owned by Medtronic at this time. In 2008, shortly after the spin-off was launched, Physio-Control launched the Lifepak 15 Monitor/Defibrillator.

In 2011, the company was reacquired and made private by Bain Capital, however the company remained a separate entity.

In 2016, Stryker Corporation announced their agreement to acquire Physio-Control International, Inc. for $1.28 Billion. Shortly after this acquisition, The LUCAS 3.1 device was launched, and featured the Stryker logo, replacing the Physio-Control logo.

As of 2022, Physio-Control, Inc. is a fully owned subsidiary of Stryker Corporation and operates under the Stryker Emergency Care division. Physio-Control acts as the product designer and manufacturer while Stryker distributes the product through their channels.

In 2024, Physio-Control and Stryker released the LIFEPAK 35 Monitor/Defibrillator which is now the flagship product of the company.

== Products ==
The company's products are primarily for the emergency treatment of sudden cardiac arrest events. The Lifepak line of defibrillators includes both advanced units for advanced cardiac life support trained personnel, and automated external defibrillators for use by first responders and the general public. Additionally, the company distributes an automated chest compression system called LUCAS. While this system is typically used in the field, it has also been used in the hospital setting to prolong human life while surgical or other procedures are accomplished. Physio-Control also produced a CPR coaching device called the TrueCPR coaching device. In 2011, their Readylink 12-lead ECG device was recognized as one of the Top Innovators of the Year by EMS World Magazine.

== Notable Uses and Customers ==
Lifepaks (typically the 12 and 15) are commonly used in medical TV shows, as their large screen can be modified and replaced with a tablet or other screen to display altered vitals or other information to better suit the show. In August 2008, NASA officially deployed a Lifepak 1000 AED on the International Space Station, which was eventually returned to Physio-Control in October 2011.

According to official Physio-Control media, a Lifepak 8 was deployed by NASA, however no further info or alternate sources exist to substantiate this claim.

NSW Ambulance is the third-largest ambulance service in the world and currently owns over 1000 Lifepak 15 defibrillators. Prior to purchasing the Lifepak 15s, NSWA used a mixture of ZOLL M-Series monitors and Lifepak 10s in their "General Duties" cars, and Intensive Care Paramedics were given access to Lifepak 12s due to their enhanced diagnostic and monitoring capabilities. NSWA is also currently performing a complete roll-out of LUCAS 3 devices to all General Duty and Intensive Care ambulances.

East Midlands Ambulance Service also uses Lifepak 15 defibrillators and many also carry LUCAS devices.

Many ambulance companies throughout the US use Lifepak monitor/defibrillators as well, however more detailed statistics are not currently available due to the number of ambulance companies present in the US.

== 2022 Merge with Stryker ==
In 2022, 6 years after Stryker's acquisition of Physio-Control, Stryker silently released the updated LIFEPAK 15 V4+ which featured the Stryker logo in place of the Physio-Control logo. Alongside the release of this new model, all legacy Physio-Control websites (with the exception of "lucas-cpr.com") were removed, with their URLs being redirected to Stryker's "Emergency Care" page. On social media platforms, Physio-Control Inc. is referred to as "Physio-Control, Now part of Stryker" to highlight the acquisition. Physio-Control Inc. remains as a wholly owned subsidiary of Stryker that designs and manufactures product to then be distributed through Stryker Emergency Care.
