= Norman Holter =

American biophysicist (1914–1983)

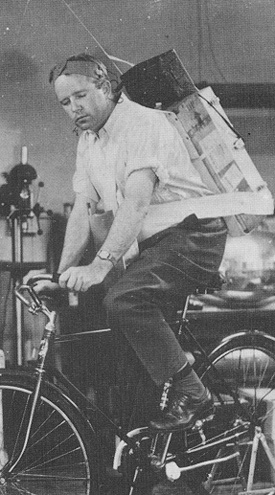
- Born: Norman Jefferis Holter; February 1, 1914; Helena, Montana, U.S.
- Died: July 21, 1983 (aged 69); Helena, Montana, U.S.
- Known for: Inventor of the Holter monitor
- Scientific career
- Fields: Biophysicist

Norman Jefferis "Jeff" Holter (February 1, 1914 – July 21, 1983) was an American biophysicist who invented the Holter monitor, a portable device for continuously monitoring the electrical activity of the heart for 24 hours or more. Holter donated the rights to his invention to medicine.

== Early life and education ==
Holter was born February 1, 1914, in Helena, Montana. He graduated from Carroll College in 1931 and then continued his studies at University of California Los Angeles, graduating from there with a master's degree in physics in 1937. He then graduated a year later from the University of Southern California with a master's degree in chemistry. He continued his education by completing postgraduate work at the University of Heidelberg (Germany), the University of Chicago, the Oak Ridge Institute of Nuclear Studies, and the University of Oregon Medical School.

== Career ==
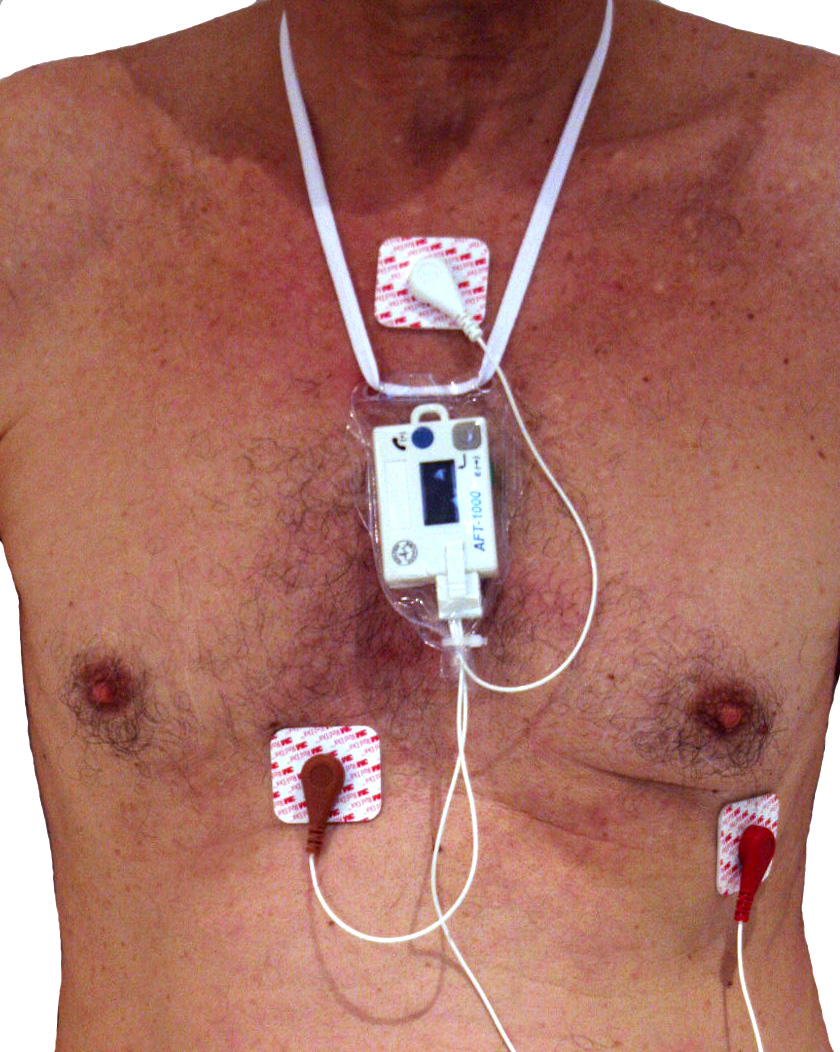
A Holter monitor

During World War II, Holter served as senior physicist in the U.S. Navy, studying the characteristics of waves. In 1946, he headed a government research team involved in the atomic-bomb testing at Bikini Atoll. After the war, he continued work with the United States Atomic Energy Commission, and served as president of the Society of Nuclear Medicine from 1955 to 1956. In 1964, he became a full professor at the University of California, San Diego, coordinating activities at the Institute of Geophysics and Planetary Physics. In 1979, the Association for the Advancement of Medical Instrumentation (AAMI) awarded Holter with the AAMI Foundation Laufman-Greatbatch Prize for his contributions to medical technology.

Holter was the son and grandson, respectively, of Montana pioneers Norman B. Holter and Anton M. Holter. Anton M. Holter was born in his native Norway and emigrated to the United States when he was 23. Numerous landmarks in and around Helena, Montana bear his family's name. These landmarks include The Holter Museum of Art, Holter Dam, and Holter Lake. The Holter Museum of Art is widely recognized as the premiere contemporary art museum in Helena, Montana, and attracts the talents and attention of international crowds.
