= MECIF Protocol =

The MECIF Protocol (Medical Computer Interface Protocol), is a rare communications protocol originally developed by Hewlett-Packard to allow external devices (e.g. computers) to communicate with certain Hewlett-Packard patient monitors. It is a client–server based protocol that uses a modified RS-232 cable to allow a client (e.g. a computer) to send commands to a server (e.g. patient monitor). The protocol can be used to retrieve vital data from patient monitors, such as ECG, blood pressure and heart-rate signals.

Ownership of the protocol has changed hands many times and was most recently supported by Philips.

Due to the complexity of the protocol, very few software applications currently support it.
