= BodyKom =

Mobile heart monitoring service

BodyKom is a mobile heart monitoring service that enable care personnel to receive the ECG of heart patients via the mobile network. The patients can be mobile and perform their everyday activities yet remain under observation. The caregiver receives diagnosis data immediately when the patient's heart starts acting abnormally. Through a backend system the clinician can set patient individual limits to support finding the abnormal heart functionality for the patient. Measures can be initiated automatically, for example by notifying the clinician and informing relatives.

The use of BodyKom does not require any change in the care routines at the hospital, other than the patient getting a new type of patient kit which includes ECG electrodes, a small portable sensor and a smart cell phone. Monitoring data is collected by the sensor and is wirelessly transferred to the cell phone. The ECG data is then transferred via the mobile network to a decision support system for adjustment and then forwarded to the caregivers system for analysis. From a medical and technical point of view, the patient is connected in the same way as with conventional ECG methods, like using a Holter monitor.

BodyKom was developed by Kiwok in cooperation with Karolinska University Hospital in Sweden.
