= Tomima Edmark =

American entrepreneur and author

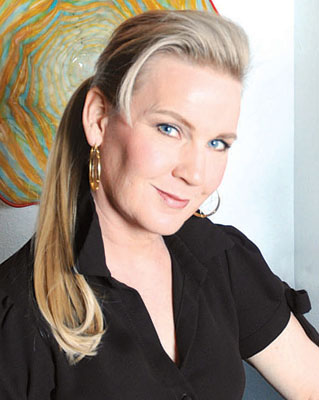
- Born: Tomima L. Edmark; 1957 (age 68–69); Seattle, Washington, US
- Education: Stephens College; The University of Texas at Austin
- Occupations: Author and founder of HerRoom and HisRoom
- Parent(s): Karl W. Edmark and Mary Middlestate Miller
- Website: www.tomima.com

Tomima Edmark (born 1957) is an American entrepreneur, author, and inventor of TopsyTail, Halo Hat and Bowrette. She is the founder of HerRoom and HisRoom, an online lingerie and men's underwear retailer based in Dallas, Texas.

== Education ==
Edmark earned a BFA and BA degree from Stephens College in Columbia, Missouri in 1979 and then she attended The University of Texas at Austin where she completed an MBA degree in 1983.

== Career ==
In 1984, after receiving her MBA, she worked with IBM as a marketing executive in Dallas, before leaving in 1992.

In 1989 Edmark filed for TopsyTail patent, received in April 1991 and established TopsyTail Corp. to market and sell the product. TopsyTail earned more than $150 million in revenue.

In 1994 Edmark introduced the Bowrette, a barrette patterned after the TopsyTail that turns ribbons and scarves into hair ornaments.

In 1998, Edmark began an e-commerce retail start-up The Andra Group. She launched HerRoom on March 3, 2000 and the men’s site, HisRoom.com was launched two years later. After listening to her friends' complaints that they hated having to try on undergarments in department store fitting rooms, she wanted to let women buy bras that fit online.

In 2011, Edmark was awarded business method patent #8,078,498 for using back and side views as well as the front.

Edmark has been featured on television shows like Good Morning America, Dateline NBC, 20/20, The Oprah Winfrey Show and in business publications like Forbes Magazine, and The Wall Street Journal.

== Books ==
- Edmark, Tomima (1991). Kissing : everything you ever wanted to know. New York: Simon & Schuster. ISBN 978-0671708832.
- Edmark, Tomima (1993). 365 ways to kiss your love : a daily guide to creative kissing. Fort Worth, Tx.: Summit Group. ISBN 978-1565300286.
- Edmark, Tomima (1994). The TopsyTail book : the guide to dozens of easy-to-do, quick and fabulous hairstyles. New York: Warner Books. ISBN 9780446670616.
- Edmark, Tomima (1995). Cigar chic : a woman's perspective. Arlington, TX: Summit Publishing Group. ISBN 978-1565301931.
- Edmark, Tomima (1995). 365 ways to date your love : a daily guide to creative romance. Fort Worth, Tex.: Summit Pub. Group. ISBN 9781565301740.
- Edmark, Tomima (1996). The kissing book : everything you need to know. Arlington, Tex.: Summit Pub. Group. ISBN 978-1565302280.
- Edmark, Tomima (1996). 365 romantic gifts for your love : a daily guide to creative giving. Arlington, Tex.: Summit Pub. Group. ISBN 9781565302112.
- Edmark, Tomima (1997). 365 Ways to Date Your Love. Tapestry Press. p. 120. ISBN 978-1930819245.
- Edmark, Tomima (1997). 365 Romantic Gifts for Your Love: A Daily Guide to Creative Giving. Tapestry Press. ISBN 9781930819238.
- Edmark, Tomima (1997). The Kissing Book: Everything You Need to Know. Tapestry Press. p. 128. ISBN 9781930819269.
- Edmark, Tomima (2001). It's a girl thing : more than 300 qualities, quirks, & quibbles that uniquely define women. Nashville, TN: TowleHouse Pub. ISBN 9780966877465.
- Edmark, Tomima (2001). It's a guy thing : more than 300 tics, traits, and tendencies that uniquely define men. Nashville, Tenn.: TowleHouse Pub. ISBN 9780966877458
