= Live Rescue: Rewind =

- Genre: Reality
- Directed by: John Gonzalez
- Presented by: Ashleigh Banfield; Matt Iseman; Dan Flynn; Titus Tero; Sean "Sticks" Larkin; Tom Morris, Jr.; Forest Smith; Mike McCabe; Garon Patrick Mosby
- Country of origin: United States
- Original language: English
- No. of seasons: 3
- No. of episodes: 38

Production
- Executive producers: Dan Cesareo; Lucilla D'Agostino; John Zito; Jordana Starr; Elaine Frontain Bryant; Shelly Tatro; Sean Gottlieb
- Camera setup: Multi-camera
- Running time: 44 minutes
- Production company: Big Fish Entertainment

Original release
- Network: A&E
- Release: May 1, 2019 – January 8, 2021

Related
- Live Rescue

Live Rescue: Rewind (stylized as Live + Rescue: Rewind) is an American reality television spin-off of Live Rescue hosted by Matt Iseman.

== Production ==
Live Rescue: Rewind highlights formerly aired episodes of Live Rescue and airs in the same format of Live PD: Rewind. Live Rescue episodes are edited down into segments and put together to air as one-hour episodes with commercials. No new footage is created specifically for the episodes although the series received its own title card. Matt Iseman continues to receive hosting credits for the episodes while Dan Flynn, Titus Tero, Sean "Sticks" Larkin, Tom Morris, Jr., Forest Smith, and Mike McCabe continue to receive analyst credits in the specific episodes they appear in.

== Episodes ==
No.	Title	Original release date	Viewers (millions)	18-49 rating
1	"Rewind #1"	May 1, 2019	0.634	0.20
2	"Rewind #2"	May 5, 2019	N/A	N/A
3	"Rewind #3"	May 23, 2019	N/A	N/A
4	"Rewind #4"	May 30, 2019	N/A	N/A
5	"Rewind #5"	July 1, 2019	N/A	N/A
6	"Rewind #6"	July 8, 2019	N/A	N/A
7	"Rewind #7"	July 11, 2019	0.647	0.16
8	"Rewind #8"	July 18, 2019	N/A	N/A
9	"Rewind #9"	July 25, 2019	0.605	0.17
10	"Rewind #17"	September 28, 2019	N/A	N/A
11	"Rewind #18"	October 4, 2019	N/A	N/A
12	"Rewind #19"	October 28, 2019	N/A	N/A
13	"Rewind #20"	October 28, 2019	N/A	N/A
14	"Rewind #21"	October 28, 2019	0.427	0.13
15	"Rewind #22"	December 16, 2019	N/A	N/A
16	"Rewind #23"	December 16, 2019	N/A	N/A
17	"Rewind #24"	December 23, 2019	N/A	N/A
18	"Rewind #25"	December 23, 2019	N/A	N/A
19	"Rewind #26"	February 3, 2020	N/A	N/A
20	"Rewind #27"	February 3, 2020	N/A	N/A
21	"Rewind #28"	February 3, 2020	N/A	N/A
22	"Rewind #29"	February 17, 2020	N/A	N/A
23	"Rewind #30"	August 21, 2020	N/A	N/A
24	"Rewind #31"	August 22, 2020	0.383	0.09
25	"Rewind #32"	August 28, 2020	0.376	0.10
26	"Rewind #33"	August 29, 2020	0.310	0.07
27	"Rewind #34"	September 4, 2020	0.398	0.08
28	"Rewind #35"	September 4, 2020	N/A	N/A
29	"Rewind #36"	September 5, 2020	0.242	0.05
30	"Rewind #37"	September 11, 2020	N/A	N/A
31	"Rewind #38"	September 11, 2020	N/A	N/A
32	"Rewind #39"	September 12, 2020	N/A	N/A
33	"Rewind #40"	November 20, 2020	N/A	N/A
34	"Rewind #41"	November 27, 2020	N/A	N/A
35	"Rewind #42"	December 4, 2020	N/A	N/A
36	"Rewind #43"	December 4, 2020	N/A	N/A
37	"Rewind #44"	December 11, 2020	N/A	N/A
38	"Rewind #45"	December 18, 2020	N/A	N/A
39	"Rewind #46"	January 1, 2021	N/A	N/A
40	"Rewind #47"	January 8, 2021	N/A	N/A
