= Live Rescue =

American reality television program

- Genre: Reality
- Presented by: Ashleigh Banfield; Dan Flynn; Titus Tero; Sean "Sticks" Larkin; Tom Morris, Jr.; Forest Smith; Mike McCabe; Matt Iseman; Halani Lobdell; Garon Patrick Mosby
- Country of origin: United States
- Original language: English
- No. of seasons: 3
- No. of episodes: 67

Production
- Executive producers: Dan Cesareo; Lucilla D'Agostino; John Zito; Kara Kurcz; Elaine Frontain Bryant; Shelly Tatro; Sean Gottlieb; Brad Abramson
- Camera setup: Multi-camera
- Running time: 86–129 minutes
- Production company: Big Fish Entertainment

Original release
- Network: A&E
- Release: April 22, 2019 – January 15, 2021

Related
- Live PD; Live Rescue: Rewind; Live Rescue: Emergency Response

Live Rescue (stylized as Live + Rescue) is an American television program on the A&E Network. It follows live camera crew ride-alongs with fire departments and rescue squads in cities and towns across the country. The series is a spin-off of Live PD.

The show was originally hosted by Ashleigh Banfield. For the second season, Matt Iseman took over as host. The show last aired live episodes in early 2021.

== Production ==
In 2019, A&E began developing a spin-off of Live PD called Live Rescue focusing on emergency rescue calls as opposed to police calls. Ashleigh Banfield was the first host of the series. The series received an initial eight episode order and premiered on April 22, 2019. A bonus episode of the series aired on May 9 bringing the episode count up to nine episodes. A&E later ordered an additional ten episodes bringing the final episode count to nineteen.

Live Rescue also has its own spin-offs entitled Live Rescue: Rewind and Live Rescue: Emergency Response. Live Rescue: Rewind highlights segments from formerly aired episodes of Live Rescue and airs in the same format of Live PD: Rewind. Live Rescue: Emergency Response is a half hour show which shows highlights from Live Rescue and interviews with the fire fighters and emergency medical technicians featured.

For the second season, Matt Iseman took over as host. Season 2 premiered on September 23, 2019.

In March 2020, the show was put on temporary hiatus due to the COVID-19 pandemic. The show moved to Friday and Saturday nights for the third season, which premiered on August 21, 2020. On October 23, 2020, the show changed from its two-hour format to three hours, and began broadcasting only on Fridays.

== Episodes ==
Season	Episodes	Originally released	
Season	Episodes	First released	Last released
1	16	April 22, 2019	August 19, 2019
2	22	September 23, 2019	March 9, 2020
3	29	August 21, 2020	January 15, 2021

== See also ==
- Critical Rescue
- Rescue 911
- Boston EMS
