= Karl W. Edmark =

American surgeon

Karl William Edmark
- Born: March 3, 1924
- Died: April 6, 1994 (aged 70); Scottsdale, Maricopa County, Arizona, US
- Resting place: Dry Creek Cemetery, Boise, Ada County, Idaho, US
- Education: M.D.
- Children: Karl W. Edmark III, Tomima Edmark, John Edmark, Charles Van Middlestate, Richard Edmark, and James Edmark

Karl William Edmark (1924–1994) was an American cardiovascular surgeon, inventor of the DC defibrillator, inventor of the Edmark damped sinusoidal defibrillation pulse, and founder of the company Physio-Control.
