= Lifepak =

Series of vital signs monitors and defibrillators

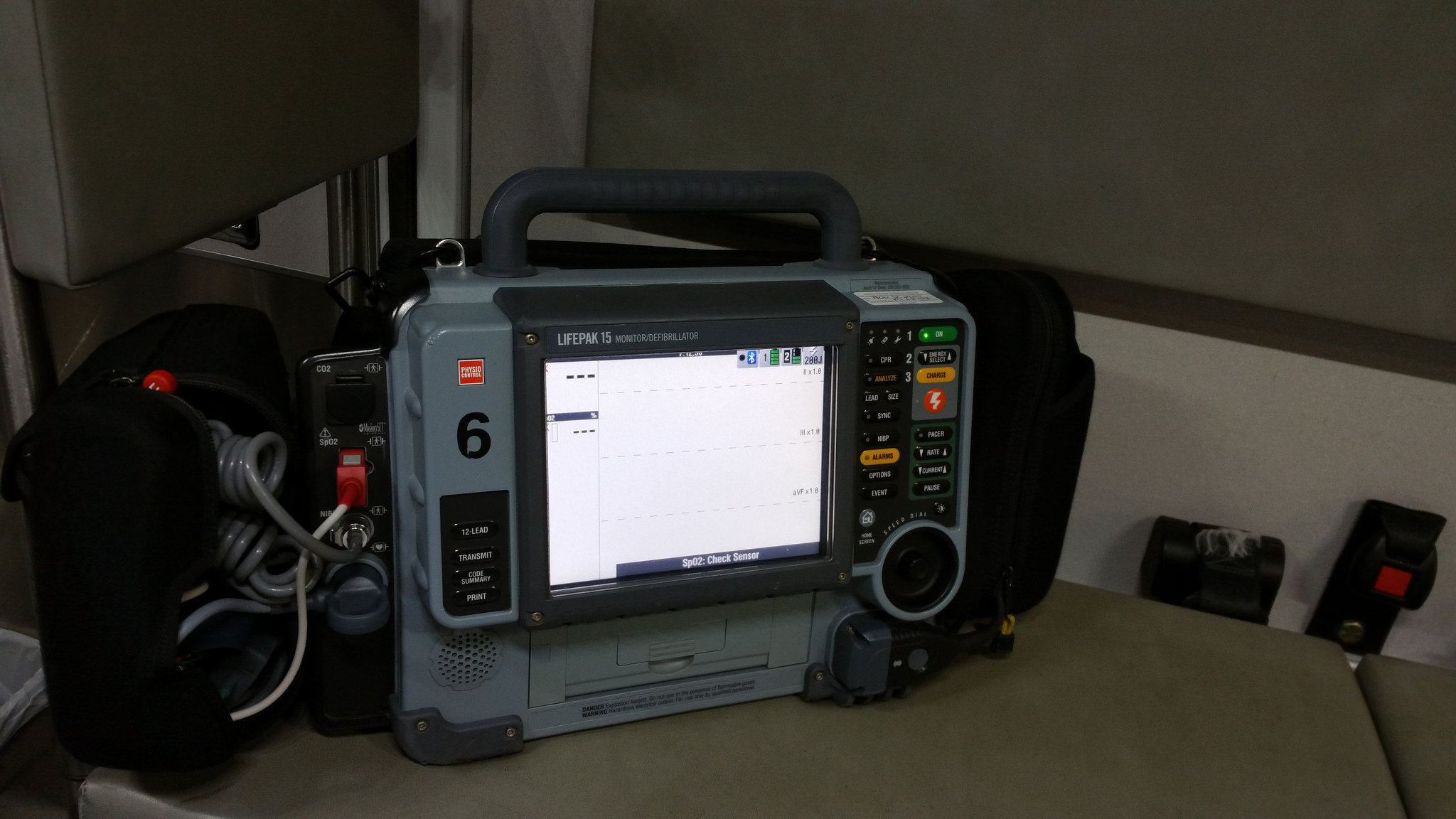
A Lifepak 15 Monitor/Defibrillator

Lifepak (stylized LIFEPAK) is a series of vital signs monitors and external cardiac defibrillators produced by medical technology company Physio-Control.

Lifepak defibrillators are manufactured and distributed from the company headquarters in Redmond, Washington.

== History ==
Physio-Control publicly demonstrated its first Lifepak branded defibrillator, Lifepak 33, in November 1968 and began commercial sale of the unit the next year in 1969. The Lifepak 33 was the lightest defibrillator available at launch, weighing 34 pounds. The defibrillator was referred to by media as a "90-day wonder" due to the entirety of its development occurring within a 90-day period. Despite being the companies first "LIFEPAK" branded defibrillator, it was named the Lifepak 33 due to the companies target weight of 33 pounds for the defibrillator.

In 1971, the Lifepak 911 was released with 12-lead ECG monitoring capability, with the Lifepak 2 being released the following year. The Lifepak 2 was designed specifically for rapid-response vehicles in emergency services, and was the first to allow transmission of ECGs via telephone to hospitals for prehospital assessment by cardiologists. In 1973, the Lifepak 3 was released with a "non-fade" display and the ability to "freeze" the cardioscope. The Lifepak 1 was released the same year and was marketed as a more basic, but more compact model, lacking a cardiograph for ECG monitoring. In 1974, the Lifepak 4 was released with an integrated ECG recorder, and was followed by the Physio 260 (for home use) and Physio 1440 cardiac care system defibrillators were released to the public.

In 1976, the Lifepak 5 was released weighing only 5 pounds and 19 ounces, with a modified Lifepak 5 accompanying the 65-member American Medical Expedition to Mount Everest in 1981 and the China-Everest Expedition in 1982. The Lifepak 6 featured a modular design with removable paddles holder and ECG printer, the Lifepak 8 featured the ability to perform transchest external pacing, and the Lifepak 100 and 200 automatic advisor defibrillators were released with an Incorporated Shock Advisory System able to recognise shockable arrhythmias. in 1989, the Lifepak 9 and 10 both integrated a "Code Summary" record for documentation, featuring the ability to record times medication was administered, when shocks were delivered and how many shocks were delivered.

In 1994, the Lifepak 11 was released, which set standards in prehospital 12-lead acquisition and transmission. In 1997, the Lifepak 500 was released as a public access defibrillator, and brought AEDs to the mainstream public. The following year, the Lifepak 12 was released, with improved monitoring and diagnostic capabilities, as well as a standardised button layout. Some ambulance services still use the Lifepak 12 due to its reliability and advanced capabilities.

In 1999, biphasic defibrillation waveforms were made available for the Lifepak 12 and 500 defibrillators and the 'ADAPTIV' biphasic waveform would become the standard waveform used in future models.

In 2002, the Lifepak 20 defibrillator/monitor was introduced to replace the 9 in the hospital market, while the Lifepak CR Plus was introduced for the public market.

In 2006, the Lifepak 1000 was introduced to replace the Lifepak 500 in the professional AED market.

In 2008, the Lifepak 15 was introduced to replace the Lifepak 12 in the prehospital and hospital settings and featured a more refined design, color LCD, CPR metronome and Bluetooth connectivity for wireless transmission of ECGs. The 15 was also the first model to support Masimo RainbowSET pulse oximetry.

The newest model, Lifepak 35, was introduced in 2024 and features a complete redesign from earlier models including omitting most of the hard button controls and instead using a touchscreen to control most functions of the device. The 35 also features a diagnostic quality LCD, cprINSIGHT and STJInsight technologies, pediatric AED protocols, and live 12 or 15 lead ECGs.

Advanced models include the Lifepak 12, 15, 20, and 35 for use by healthcare professionals such as emergency medical technicians and paramedics. Automatic units include the Lifepak 500, Lifepak 1000, Lifepak CR Plus and the Lifepak CR2 for use by members of the public who have been trained to operate them.

== Usage ==
Most Lifepak defibrillators are capable of performing more than only defibrillation. Many models allow for cardiac monitoring (including heart rate monitoring and 12-Lead ECG acquisition and interpretation) and alert the users to sudden changes. The Lifepak 15, 20/20e, 35 and CR2 include a CPR metronome that is also capable of verbally aiding rescuers in providing ventilations. Advanced Lifepak monitor/defibrillators also include options for synchronized cardioversion, external pacing, oxygen saturation monitoring, End tidal CO_{2}, and both non-invasive and invasive blood pressure. The Lifepak CR2 and 35 include CPRInsight analysis technology which allows for chest compression during analysis of the patient's ECG.

== In popular culture ==
In the 1975 film Three Days of the Condor, several Lifepak 911 monitors are used in an ICU. One of them sounds an alarm when a patient is murdered.

== See also ==
- Ambulance
- Medical device
- Physio-Control
- Defibrillation
- Cardioversion
- Electrocardiography
