= Holter monitor =

Portable device for cardiac monitoring

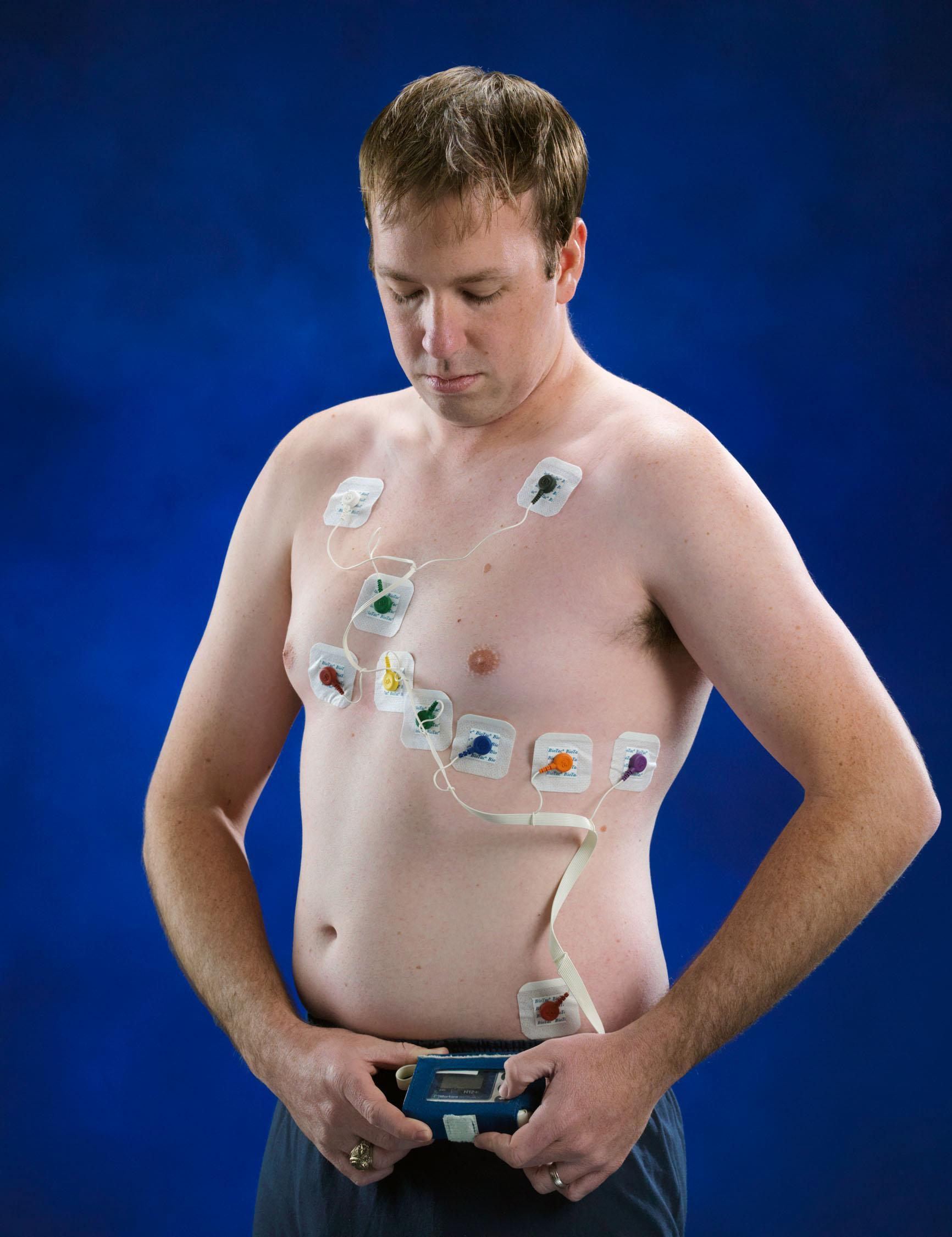
- 10-lead Holter monitor with the recording device attached to waistband
- Specialty: Cardiology, electrophysiology

In medicine, a Holter monitor (often simply Holter) is a type of ambulatory electrocardiography device, a portable device for cardiac monitoring (the monitoring of the electrical activity of the cardiovascular system) worn for at least 24 hours.

The Holter's most common use is for monitoring ECG heart activity (electrocardiography or ECG). Its extended recording period is sometimes useful for observing occasional cardiac arrhythmias which would be difficult to identify in a shorter period. For patients having more transient symptoms, a cardiac event monitor which can be worn for a month or more can be used.

When used to study the heart, much like standard electrocardiography, the Holter monitor records electrical signals from the heart via a series of electrodes attached to the chest. Electrodes are placed over bones to minimize artifacts from muscular activity. The number and position of electrodes varies by model, but most Holter monitors employ between three and eight. These electrodes are connected to a small piece of equipment that is attached to the patient's belt or hung around the neck, keeping a log of the heart's electrical activity throughout the recording period. A 12-lead Holter system is used when precise ECG information is required to analyse the exact origin of the abnormal signals.

== History ==
The Holter monitor was developed at the Holter Research Laboratory in Helena, Montana, by experimental physicists Norman J. Holter and Bill Glasscock, who started work on radio telemetry in 1949. Inspired by a suggestion from cardiologist Paul Dudley White in the early 1950s, they redirected their efforts toward development of a wearable cardiac monitoring device. The Holter monitor was released for commercial production in 1962.

== Data storage ==
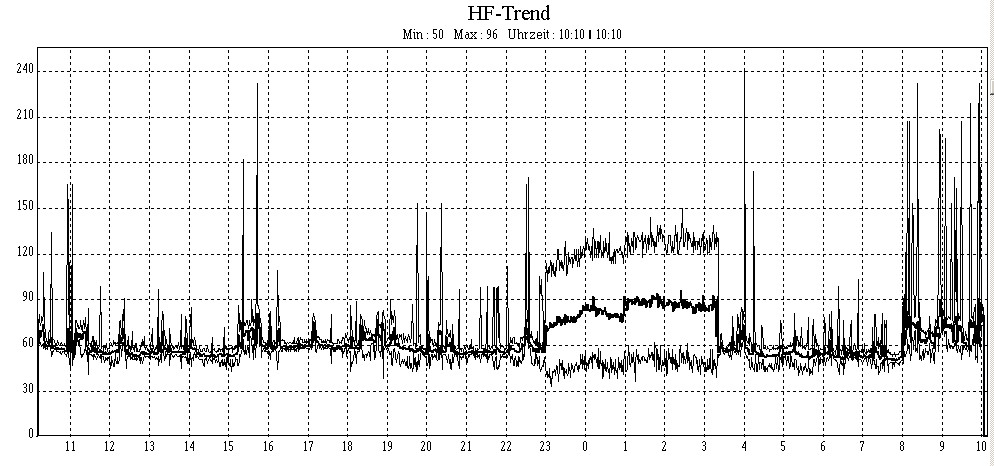
Atrial fibrillation recorded by a Holter monitor

Older monitors used reel-to-reel tapes or C90 or C120 audio cassettes, moving at a 1.7 mm/s or 2 mm/s speed to record the data. The recording could be played back and analyzed at 60 times the recording speed, so 24 hours of recording could be analyzed in 24 minutes. Modern monitors record EDF-files on digital flash memory. The information is loaded on a computer, which counts ECG complexes; calculates summary statistics, such as average, minimum, and maximum heart rate; and finds parts of the recording that are worthy of further study.

== Components ==
Each Holter system has hardware (called monitor or recorder) for recording the signal, and software for review and analysis of the record. There may be a "patient button" on the front that the patient can press at specific instants such as feeling/being sick, going to bed, taking pills, marking an event of symptoms which is then documented in the symptoms diary, etc.; this records a mark that identifies the time of the action on the recording. Advanced Holter recorders are able to display the signal, useful for checking the signal quality.

=== Recorder ===
The size of the recorder differs depending on the manufacturer of the device. The average dimensions of today's Holter monitors are about 110 × 70 × 30 mm, but some are only 61 × 46 × 20 mm and weigh 99 g.

Most Holter Monitors monitor the ECG via two or three channels. Depending on manufacturer, different lead systems and numbers of leads are used; the number of leads may be minimised for patient comfort. Two or three channel recording has been used for a long time in the Holter monitoring history; 12-channel Holters were introduced later, using either the standard 12-lead electrocardiograph or the modified (Mason-Likar) exercise lead system.

These Holter monitors can occasionally provide information similar to that of an ECG cardiac stress test examination. They are also suitable when analyzing patients after myocardial infarction. Recordings from these 12-lead monitors are of a significantly lower resolution than those from a standard 12-lead ECG, and in some cases have been shown to provide misleading ST segment representation, even though some devices allow setting the sampling frequency up to 1000 Hz for special-purpose examinations such as detection of "late potential".

Another innovation is the inclusion of a triaxial movement sensor, which records the patient's physical activity and, on examination and software processing, extracts three movement statuses: sleeping, standing, or walking. Some modern devices can record spoken patient diary entries that can be listened to.

There are now wireless patch-style Holter monitors available, with 1 to 3 channels, enabling continuous monitoring from 24 hours to 14 days.

=== Analyzing software ===
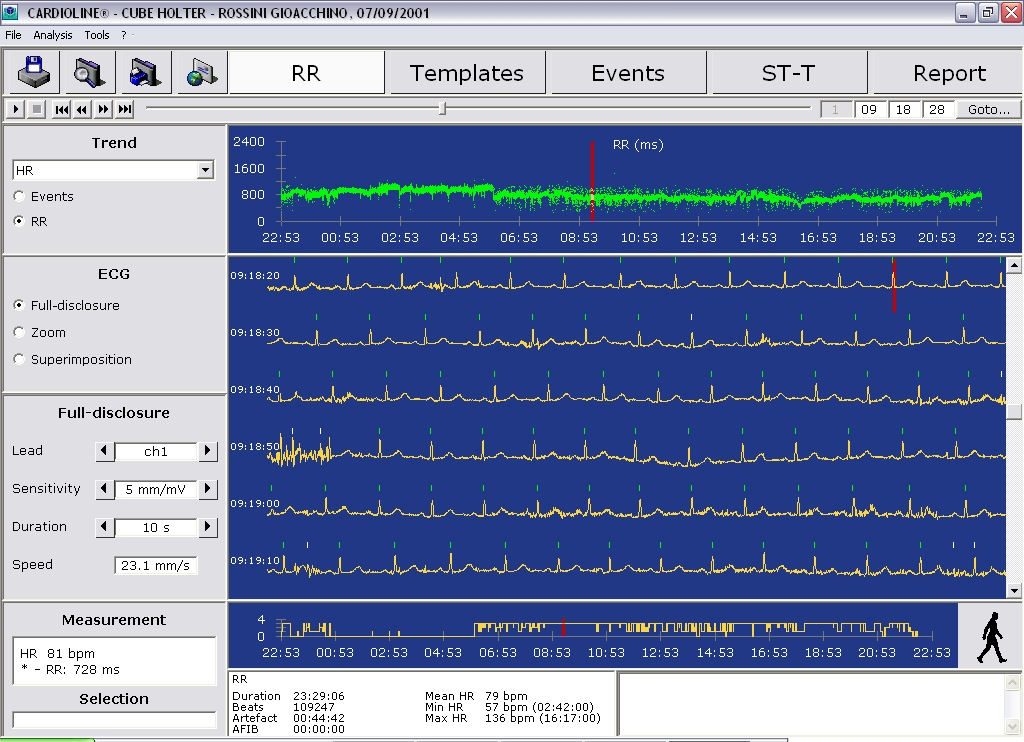
Screenshot of a computer software used to analyze Holter ECG recordings

After the recording of ECG signal for typically 24 hours, the signal must be analysed. Instead of having a person listen for the full 24 hours, integrated automatic analysis determines different sorts of heart beats, rhythms, etc. The success of the analysis is closely associated with the signal quality, which mainly depends upon the attachment of the electrodes to the patient's body. Incorrect attachment allows electromagnetic disturbance to add noise to the record, particularly with rapid patient movement, impeding processing. Other factors can also affect signal quality, such as muscle tremors, sampling rate and resolution of the digitized signal (high quality devices offer higher sampling frequency).

The automatic analysis commonly provides the physician with information about heart beat morphology, beat interval measurement, heart rate variability, rhythm overview and patient diary (moments when the patient pressed the patient button). Advanced systems also perform spectral analysis, ischemic burden evaluation, graph of patient's activity or PQ segment analysis. Also possible is the ability to monitor and analyse pacemaker impulse detection, useful for checking pacemaker function.

Some platforms already use Artificial Intelligence, which helps with cleaning artifacts, classifying heartbeats and can even generate a pre-report, which must be validated by a specialist doctor.

== Gallery ==
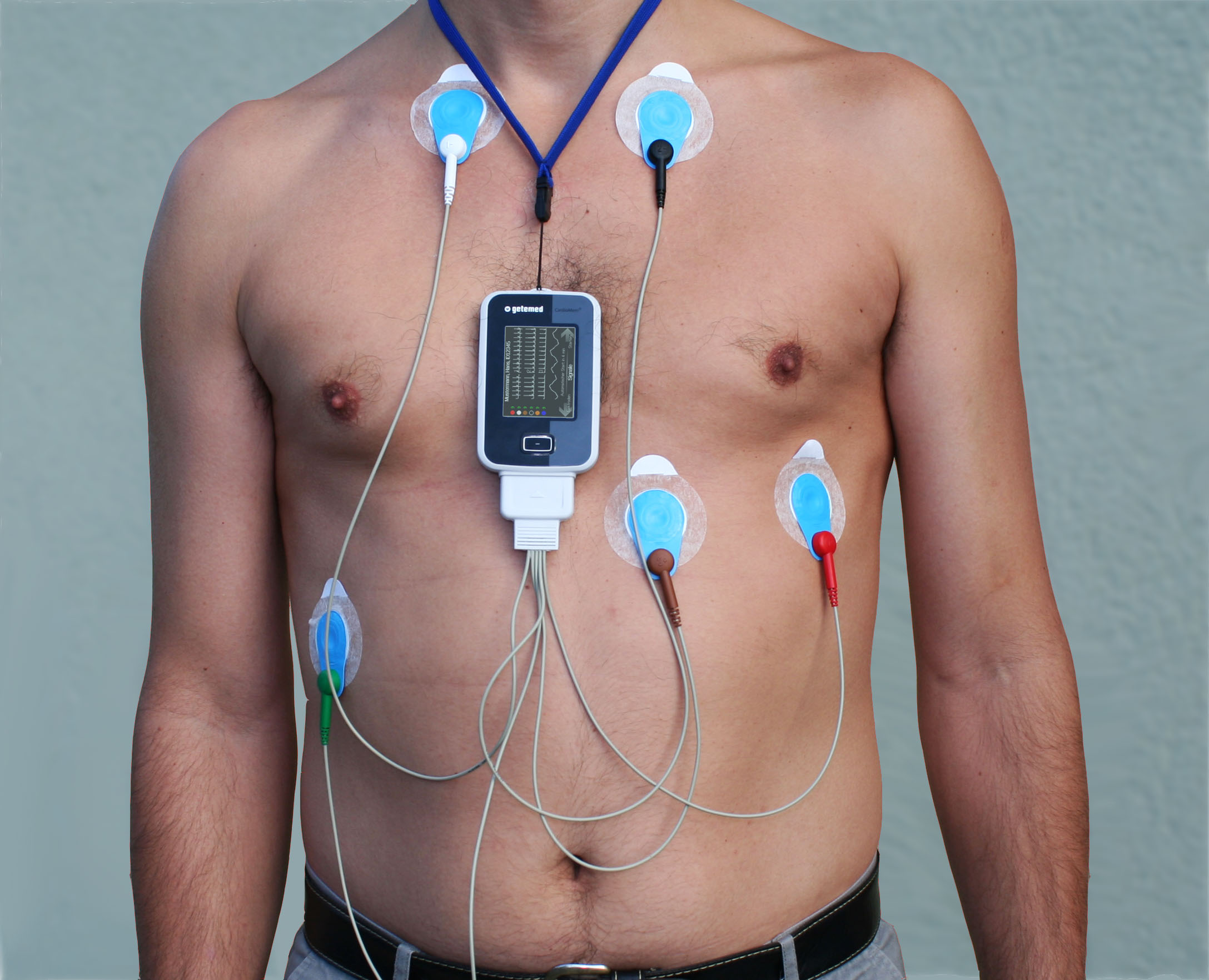
A 5-lead placement EASI configuration Holter monitor

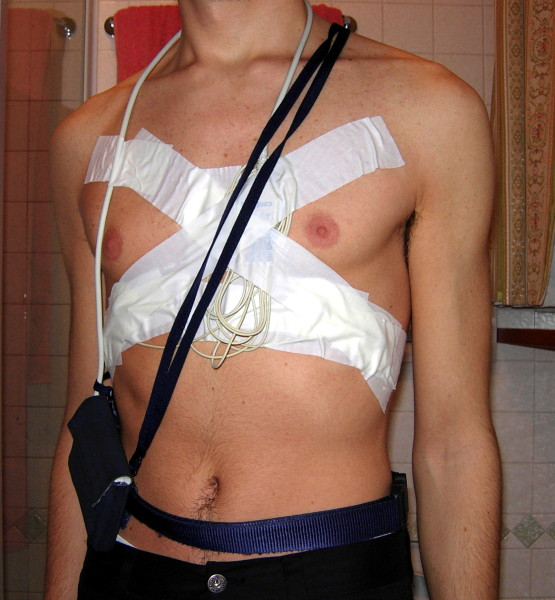
A Holter monitor can be worn for many days without causing significant discomfort.

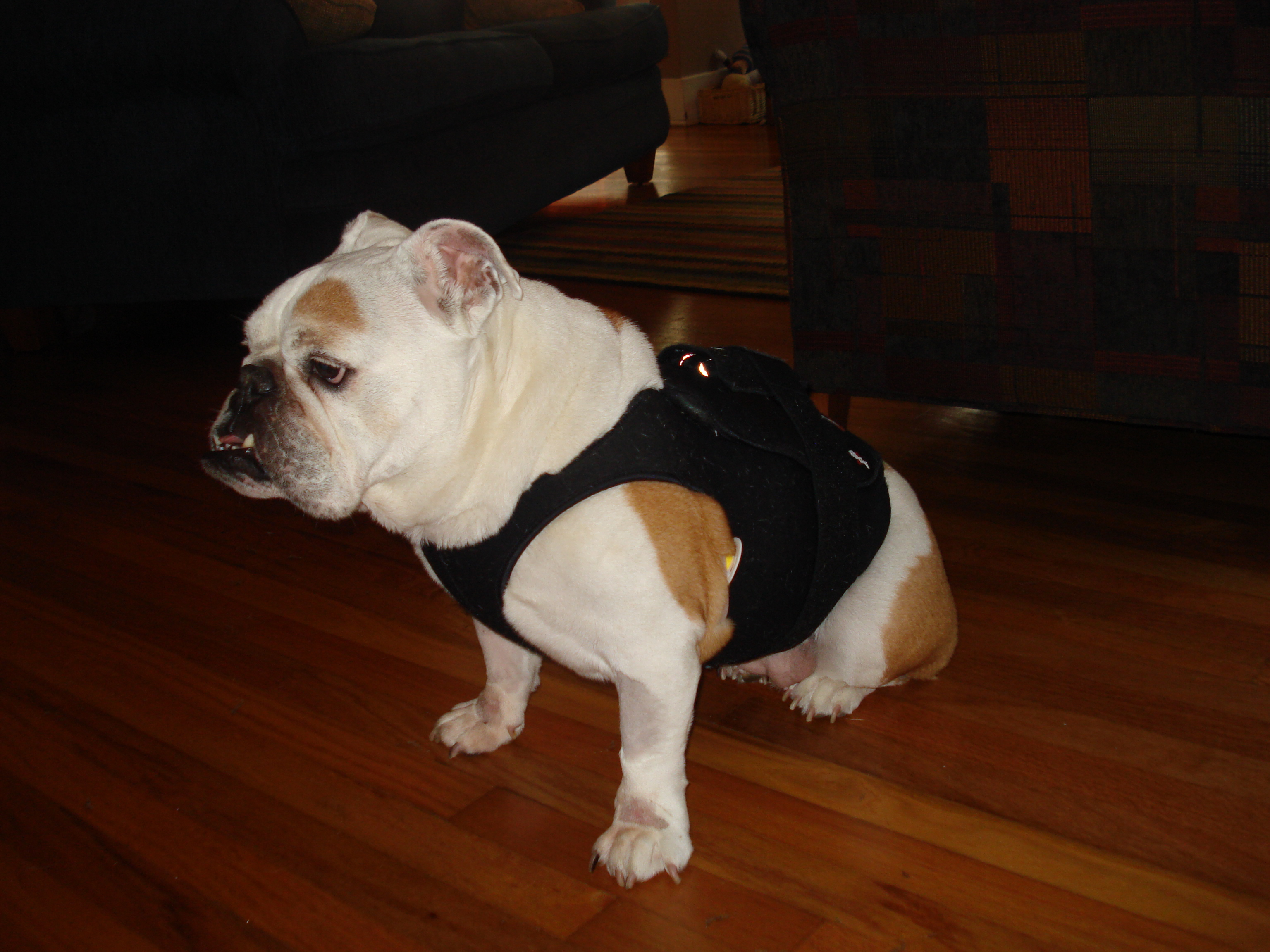
Canine Holter monitor with DogLeggs Vest

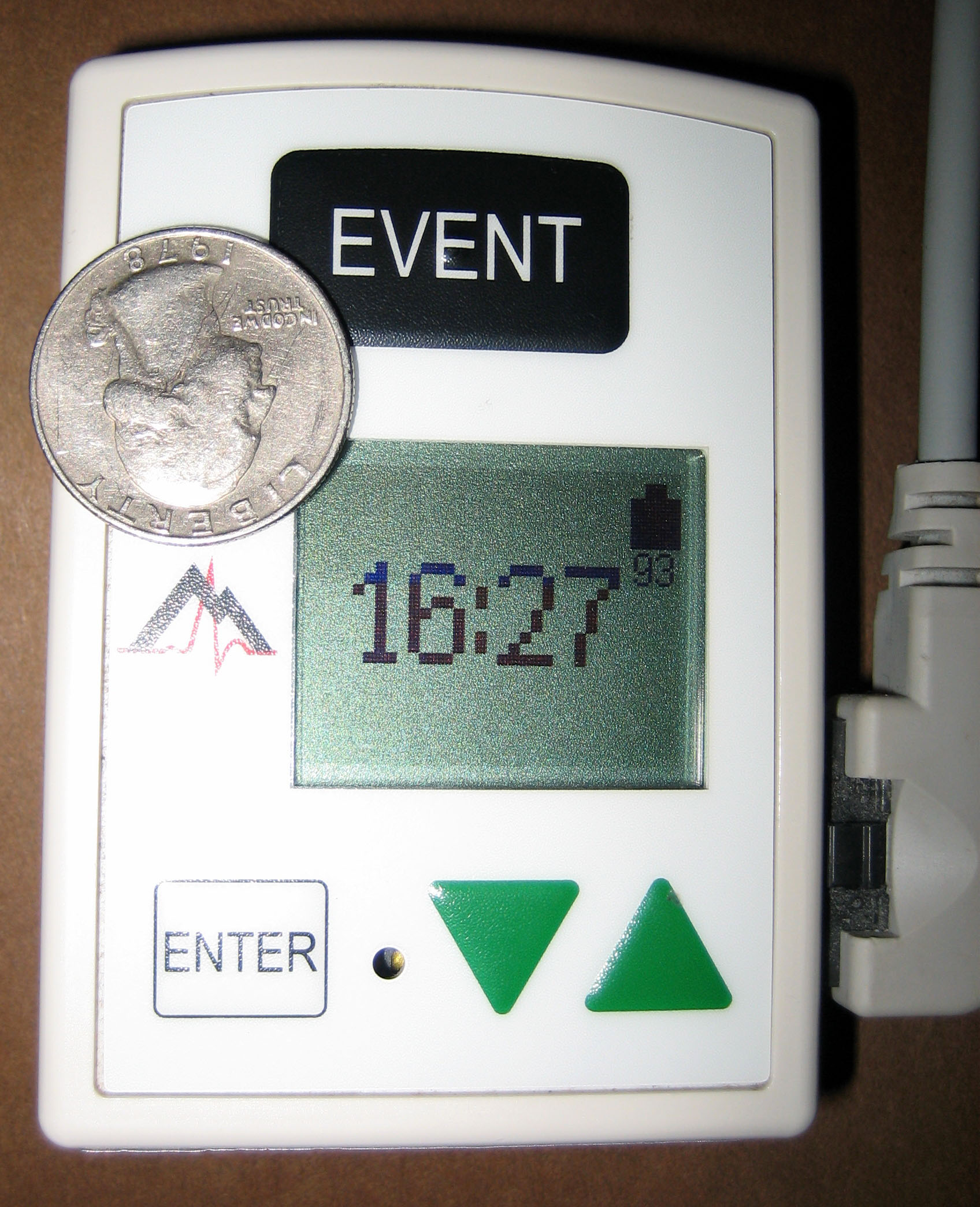
A Holter monitor with a US quarter dollar coin to show scale

== See also ==
- Wireless ambulatory ECG
- BodyKom, a heart monitoring service transmitting data via the mobile cellular telephone network
