= Richmond =

Richmond most often refers to:

- Richmond, British Columbia, a city in Canada
- Richmond, California, a city in the United States
- Richmond, London, a town in the London Borough of Richmond upon Thames, England
- Richmond, North Yorkshire, a town in England
- Richmond, Victoria, a suburb of Melbourne, Australia
- Richmond, Virginia, the capital city of Virginia, United States

Richmond may also refer to:

== People ==
- Richmond (surname)
- Earl of Richmond
- Duke of Richmond
- Richmond C. Beatty (1905–1961), American academic, biographer and critic
- Richmond Avenal, character in British sitcom The IT Crowd

== Places ==
=== Australia ===
- Richmond, New South Wales
  - RAAF Base Richmond
  - Richmond Woodlands Important Bird Area
- Richmond River, New South Wales
  - Division of Richmond (Federal Electoral district)
  - Electoral district of Richmond (New South Wales)
- Richmond, Queensland
- Shire of Richmond, Queensland
- Richmond, South Australia
- Richmond, Tasmania
- Richmond, Victoria
  - Electoral district of Richmond (Victoria)
  - City of Richmond
  - Richmond railway station, Melbourne

=== Canada ===
- Richmond, British Columbia, a city in Metro Vancouver
  - Richmond (British Columbia provincial electoral district)
- Richmond, Calgary, Alberta, a neighbourhood
- Richmond Parish, New Brunswick
- Richmond, Nova Scotia
  - Richmond (Nova Scotia federal electoral district)
  - Richmond (Nova Scotia provincial electoral district)
- Richmond, Ontario, a community part of the city of Ottawa
- Richmond, Prince Edward Island
- Richmond, Quebec
  - Richmond (Quebec provincial electoral district)

=== Germany ===
- Schloss Richmond, a castle in Brunswick

=== Ireland ===
- Richmond, County Tipperary, a townland in north County Tipperary
- Richmond Park (football ground), Dublin

=== Jamaica ===
- Richmond, Jamaica

=== New Zealand ===
- Richmond, Tasman, a town in the Tasman district in the South Island
- Richmond, Canterbury, a small suburb in Christchurch, South Island
- Richmond, Invercargill, a minor suburb, South Island

=== South Africa ===
- Richmond, Northern Cape
- Richmond, KwaZulu-Natal

=== United Kingdom ===
- Richmond, London, previously known as Shene, a town formerly in Surrey and now in the London Borough of Richmond upon Thames
  - The London Borough of Richmond upon Thames, colloquially known as Richmond borough
  - Richmond station
  - Richmond Hill, London
  - Museum of Richmond in Richmond, London
  - Richmond Palace, previously known as Shene Palace
  - Richmond Park in the London Borough of Richmond upon Thames
  - Richmond American University London
  - Municipal Borough of Richmond (Surrey) (1890 to 1965)
  - Richmond (Surrey) (UK Parliament constituency), 1918–1983
    - Richmond Park (UK Parliament constituency), currently-existing successor constituency of the above
- Richmond, North Yorkshire, a market town and the administrative centre of the district of Richmondshire
  - Richmond Castle in Richmond, North Yorkshire
  - Honour of Richmond, an English feudal barony in north-west Yorkshire
  - Richmond (Yorks) (UK Parliament constituency), 1885–2024
    - Richmond and Northallerton (UK Parliament constituency), currently-existing successor constituency of the above
- Richmonds in the Wood, Thaxted, Essex
- Richmond, Sheffield, an area of Sheffield, South Yorkshire

=== United States ===
- Richmond, Alabama, an unincorporated community
- Richmond, Arkansas, an unincorporated community
- Richmond, California
  - Richmond station (California)
- Richmond District, San Francisco, California
- Richmond County, Georgia, a county
- Richmond, Illinois, a town
- Richmond, Indiana, a city
- Richmond, Kansas
- Richmond, Kentucky
- Richmond, Louisiana, a village
- Richmond, Maine, a New England town
  - Richmond (CDP), Maine, village within the town
- Richmond, Massachusetts, a New England town
- Richmond, Michigan, in Macomb County
- New Richmond, Michigan, in Allegan County
- Richmond, Minnesota
- Richmond, Missouri
- Richmond, New Hampshire, a New England town
- Richmond, New York, a town
- Richmond County, North Carolina, a county
- Richmond, Ohio
- Richmond, Oregon, an unincorporated community
- Richmond, Portland, Oregon, a neighborhood
- Richmond, Rhode Island, a New England town
- Richmond, Texas
- Richmond, Utah
- Richmond, Vermont, a New England town
  - Richmond (CDP), Vermont, village within the town
- Richmond, Virginia, the state's capital city
  - Richmond Raceway
  - University of Richmond
- Richmond, Shawano County, Wisconsin, a town
- Richmond, St. Croix County, Wisconsin, a town
- Richmond, Walworth County, Wisconsin, a town
- Richmond (community), Wisconsin, an unincorporated community

== Rivers ==
- Richmond Creek (disambiguation)
- Richmond River, New South Wales, Australia
- Richmond River (St. Vincent)

== Ships ==
- Richmond (1811 ship), wrecked in 1822 in the Sea of Java
- HMS Richmond, several ships in the British Navy
- USS Richmond, several ships in the United States Navy

== Sports clubs ==
- AFC Richmond, a fictional association football club in the TV series Ted Lasso
- Richmond F.C., a rugby union club in Richmond, London, England
- Richmond Football Club, an Australian rules football club in Melbourne, Australia
- Richmond Association F.C., an amateur association football club from Richmond-upon-Thames in London

== Other uses ==
- Confitería Richmond, a former tea room and literary café in Buenos Aires, Argentina
- Richmond (automobile), cars built in Richmond, Indiana, United States
- Richmond (cigarette)
- Richmond (Natchez, Mississippi), a historic mansion built in 1810
- Richmond (novel), an 1827 crime novel by Thomas Skinner Surr
- Richmond Herald, in England, an officer of arms
- Richmond rifle, a rifled musket produced by the Richmond Armory in Richmond, Virginia, for use by the Confederate States Army during the American Civil War

== See also ==
- Richmond Bridge (disambiguation)
- Richmond College (disambiguation)
- Richmond County (disambiguation)
- Richmond Hill (disambiguation)
- Richmond Oval (disambiguation)
- Richmond Park (disambiguation)
- Richmond Station (disambiguation)
- Richmond Township (disambiguation)
- Borough of Richmond (disambiguation)
- New Richmond (disambiguation)
- Richemont (disambiguation)
- Richmound, Saskatchewan
