= Richland =

Richland may refer to:

== Places in the United States ==
=== Cities, towns, and unincorporated communities ===
- Richland, Georgia, a city
- Richland, Rush County, Indiana, an unincorporated community
- Richland, Iowa, a city
- Richland, Kansas, a ghost town
- Richland, Michigan, a village
- Richland, Mississippi, a city
- Richland, Holmes County, Mississippi, an unincorporated community
- Richland, Missouri, a city
- Richland, Nebraska, a village
- Richland, New Jersey, an unincorporated community
- Richland, New York, a town
- Richland, Oregon, a city
- Richland, Pennsylvania, a borough
- Richland, South Dakota, an unincorporated community
- Richland, Tennessee, an unincorporated community
- Richland, Texas, a town
- Richland, Washington, a city
- Richland, Richland County, Wisconsin, a town
- Richland, Rusk County, Wisconsin, a town

=== Counties, parishes, and townships ===
- Richland County, Illinois
- Richland Parish, Louisiana
- Richland County, Montana
- Richland County, North Dakota
- Richland County, Ohio
- Richland County, South Carolina
- Richland County, Wisconsin
- Richland Township (disambiguation)

== Education in the United States ==
- Richland Community College, Decatur, Illinois
- Richland College, Dallas, Texas, a community college
- Richland High School (disambiguation)
- Richland School District (disambiguation)

== Places on the United States National Register of Historic Places ==
- Richland Plantation, Norwood, Louisiana
- Richland (Harwood, Maryland), a home
- Richland (Church Hill, Mississippi)
- Richland (Blaine, Tennessee)

== Other uses ==
- USS Richland
- Richland, California, a former train station on the Escondido Subdivision
- Richland Correctional Institution, Mansfield, Richland County, Ohio
- AMD Richland APU architecture

== See also ==
- Richlands (disambiguation)
- Ridgeland (disambiguation)
