= Richmond micropolitan area =

The Richmond micropolitan area may refer to:

- The Richmond, Kentucky micropolitan area, United States
- The Richmond, Indiana micropolitan area, United States

== See also ==
- Richmond metropolitan area (disambiguation)
- Richmond (disambiguation)
