= Richfield =

Richfield may refer to:

== Places ==
=== Canada ===
- Richfield, Edmonton, Alberta, a neighbourhood
- Richfield, Nova Scotia
- Richfield, British Columbia, a ghost town from the Cariboo Gold Rush

=== United States ===
- Richfield, California
- Richfield, Idaho
- Richfield, Iowa
- Richfield, Kansas
- Richfield, Minnesota
- Richfield, Nebraska
- Richfield, New York
  - Richfield (hamlet), New York
- Richfield, North Carolina
- Richfield, Ohio
- Richfield, Pennsylvania
- Richfield, Utah
- Richfield, Adams County, Wisconsin
- Richfield, Washington County, Wisconsin
- Richfield, Wood County, Wisconsin
- Richfield Township (disambiguation)

== People ==
- Edwin Richfield, English actor

== Other uses ==
- Richfield Oil Corporation, a former brand of filling station in the western United States that merged to form the Atlantic Richfield Company (ARCO)

== See also ==
- Richfield High School (disambiguation)
