= Richland Township, Illinois =

Richland Township, Illinois may refer to one of the following townships:

- Richland Township, LaSalle County, Illinois
- Richland Township, Marshall County, Illinois
- Richland Township, Shelby County, Illinois

Until 1850, Cortland Township, DeKalb County, Illinois was called Richland Township.

See also

- Richland Township (disambiguation)
