= Richmond Township, Michigan =

Richmond Township may refer to the following places in the U.S. state of Michigan:

- Richmond Township, Macomb County, Michigan
- Richmond Township, Marquette County, Michigan
- Richmond Township, Osceola County, Michigan

== See also ==
- Richmond, Michigan, Macomb County
- New Richmond, Michigan, Allegan County
- Richmond Township (disambiguation)
- Richmond (disambiguation)
- Richfield Township, Michigan (disambiguation)
- Richland Township, Michigan (disambiguation)
