= Richland Township, Michigan =

Richland Township may refer to the following places in the U.S. state of Michigan:

- Richland Township, Kalamazoo County, Michigan
- Richland Township, Missaukee County, Michigan
- Richland Township, Montcalm County, Michigan
- Richland Township, Ogemaw County, Michigan
- Richland Township, Saginaw County, Michigan

== See also ==
- Richland, Michigan, Kalamazoo County
- Richland Township (disambiguation)
- Richland (disambiguation)
- Richfield Township, Michigan (disambiguation)
- Richmond Township, Michigan (disambiguation)
