= List of changes made due to the George Floyd protests =

Names and symbols changed due to the George Floyd protests

The murder of George Floyd, a Black American man, by a white police officer, Derek Chauvin, during an arrest in Minneapolis, Minnesota on May 25, 2020, sparked large-scale protests against systemic racism, both in the United States and elsewhere. As a result of the protests, numerous controversial forms of symbolism were either changed or removed.

In the United States, changes focused on removing and prohibiting displays of the Confederate battle flag; the flag of Mississippi was changed to remove a Confederate battle insignia. Around the world, numerous name changes occurred in response to the protests, while in Canada, the U.S. and New Zealand several police reforms were enacted, primarily in relation to the policing of ethnic minority communities.

Several sports teams that used mascots featuring Native Americans, both inside and outside the United States, announced plans to change them; the State of Rhode Island and Providence Plantations voted to shorten its name to the 'State of Rhode Island'.

In the film and television industry, numerous casting changes occurred in relation to white voice actors for non-white characters, while several films and television shows were edited, rewritten, canceled, or pulled from streaming services as a result of the protests.

Key:

Change reported but not yet executed
Change pending
Change made, then partially or fully reversed

== Employment practices ==
Employer	Reported	Details	Ref.
United States Army		To "improve diversity, equity, and inclusion", the Army announced that it would remove "photos from officer promotion boards beginning August 2020".	

== Flags ==
=== Design changes ===
Old	New	Represents	Reported	Executed	Details	Ref.
		The Flag of Mississippi	Jun 30, 2020	Jun 30, 2020	The Mississippi Legislature passed a bill to relinquish the state flag, remove it from public premises within 15 days of the bill's effective date, and redesign it via commission, with the new design omitting the Confederate battle flag and including the phrase "In God We Trust". Republican Governor Tate Reeves had stated that he was against the Legislature changing the flag, but that if the Legislature were to pass such a bill he would sign it. Reeves signed the bill on June 30, 2020. Mississippi was the last U.S. state to incorporate the Confederate battle flag in its state flag; a poll had concluded that most Mississippians supported the removal of this element from the state flag. Voters approved a new design in a referendum on November 3, 2020. It became the official state flag on January 11, 2021.	

=== Prohibition of Confederate flag emblems ===
Organization	Announced	Details	Ref.
United States Marine Corps	Jun 5, 2020	The U.S. Marines officially banned the Confederate battle flag from both public and work spaces on its military bases, including its display on vehicle bumper stickers, clothing, and coffee mugs.	
United States Navy	Jun 9, 2020	Admiral Michael M. Gilday directed his staff to begin crafting an order banning the Confederate battle flag from "all public spaces and work areas aboard Navy installations, ships, aircraft and submarines."	
NASCAR	Jun 10, 2020	Display of the Confederate battle flag was prohibited at all NASCAR events and properties.	
Cork GAA	Jun 12, 2020	Fans of the Gaelic Athletic Associated Cork team use the Confederate battle flag due to County Cork's nickname, "the Rebel county". The team announced the prohibition of the flag.	
United States Forces Korea	Jun 15, 2020	U.S. Forces Korea banned display of the Confederate battle flag and depictions of it on USFK installations, except for artistic and educational displays.	
U.S. military installations	Jul 17, 2020	U.S. Defense Secretary Mark Esper effectively banned display of Confederate flags on military installations with a memo listing flags authorized for display that leaves out Confederate flags.	
United States Coast Guard	Jul 18, 2020	Confederate flag specifically prohibited by Commandant Adm. Karl Schultz.	

=== Removal of physical flags ===
Flag	Location	City	State	Announced	Removed	Details	Ref.
Confederate battle flag Confederate battle flag	Confederate Memorial Park	Seffner	Florida	Jun 1, 2020	Jun 1, 2020	A 60-by-30-foot (18.3 m × 9.1 m) Confederate flag at the intersection of I-4 and I-75, just east of Tampa, was temporarily removed by its owner, the Sons of Confederate Veterans, after threats to burn it were made on social media.	
Confederate battle flag Confederate battle flag	Memorial Park	Kennesaw	Georgia	Jun 15, 2020	Jun 16, 2020	The city decided that it will no longer fly the Confederate battle flag in downtown Kennesaw's Memorial Park on Main Street. Flag was cut down prior to protests and city council members agreed not to replace it, despite violating state law to do so. On June 16, it was replaced with an older version of the Georgia state flag.	
Flag of Mississippi Mississippi state flag	City-owned buildings	Gulfport	Mississippi	Jun 16, 2020	Jun 30, 2020	The city of Gulfport removed all Mississippi state flags from city-owned buildings.	
Flag of Mississippi Mississippi state flag	City-wide	Bay St. Louis	Mississippi	Jun 16, 2020	Jun 30, 2020	The city council decided to stop flying the state flag.	
Flag of the Black Country Flag of the Black Country	West Midlands Fire Service fire stations	West Midlands	England	Jul 16, 2020	—	The Black Country's flag was designed by Gracie Shepherd, an 11-year-old schoolgirl, in 2012. It includes a chain motif representing "the chain industry in the region, as well as the linking up of the different communities". The flag has been controversial as chains made in the region were used on slaves in the Caribbean and North America. The fire service sent a letter to all staff on July 16 banning the use of the flag; it reversed its decision on July 24.	
Confederate battle flag Confederate battle flag	Grand Ledge Public Schools	Grand Ledge	Michigan	Jul 20, 2020	Jul 20, 2020	The School Board prohibited "racially divisive messaging, images, or symbols", specifically mentioning the Confederate flag.	
Flag of Norway Flag of Norway Flag of the United States Flag of the United States	The Nordic Pineapple (bed and breakfast)	St. Johns	Michigan	Jul 20, 2020	Jul 20, 2020	Since opening the business in 2018, the owners had flown a Norwegian flag alongside an American flag at the entrance because the grandfather of one of the owners was born in Norway. The Norwegian flag has the same colors as the Confederate battle flag and was occasionally mistaken for it, despite its different design, which lacks stars. In the past, they had explained the nature of the flag to anyone who expressed concerns. But after receiving "at least a dozen hateful emails" in the summer of 2020, they decided to stop displaying any flags. They soon restored the American flag and later replaced the Norwegian flag with a triangular Norwegian vimpel pennant in the flag's colors.	
Confederate battle flag Confederate battle flag	Oregon Commission on Historic Cemeteries		Oregon	Oct 23, 2020		The Oregon Historic Preservation Office Commission on historic cemeteries officially adopted a position paper recommending that Confederate Flags not be displayed at historic cemeteries.	

== Heraldry ==
Old	New	Emblem	Reported	Details	Ref.
Coat of arms of Imperial College London with the motto (now removed)		Coat of arms of Imperial College London	Jun 5, 2020	Imperial College London decided to remove its motto from the official rendition of its coat of arms to "better reflect the College's culture, values and commitment to supporting a diverse and inclusive community." The motto read Scientia imperii decus et tutamen, which translates to "Scientific knowledge, the crowning glory and the safeguard of the empire".	
		Seal of Rhode Island	Jun 12, 2020	An executive order by Gov. Gina Raimondo removed "and Providence Plantations" from official state documents and symbols. Leading legislators of the General Assembly then removed the phrase from internal legislative documents. Rhode Island voters approved the name change in a referendum on November 3, 2020. The same question had previously failed 78% to 22% in 2010. Though Providence Plantations did not utilize slaves, petitioners argued the word has connotations of Southern slave plantations, and that Rhode Island merchants historically played a large role in the transatlantic slave trade.	
		Ventura County, California, seal	Jun 22, 2020	Seal was redesigned to remove Junípero Serra.	
		Insignia of the Order of St Michael and St George (Personal use by the Governor-General of Jamaica)	Jun 26, 2020	Patrick Allen, the Governor-General of Jamaica, declared that he was suspending his usage of the insignia due to ongoing protests against images that "normalize the continued degradation of people of color." The insignia depicts a white Archangel Michael standing over a dark-skinned Satan.	
		Placerville, California, seal	Jul 14, 2020	The city has had the nickname "Hangtown" since the 1850s. The city first considered removing a noose from its city seal because of its associations with lynching. The city council voted unanimously to remove the image on April 14, 2021.	

Notable proposed changes:

- The coat of arms of Massachusetts, displayed in the Seal of Massachusetts and Flag of Massachusetts contains a colonist's sword held over the image of a Native American, both of which were criticized by activists. A state commission created by law to examine the issue voted in 2022 to replace the flag.

== Museums and other displays ==
Name	Location			Reported	Details	Ref.
Penn Museum	Philadelphia	Pennsylvania	United States	Jul 8, 2020	The museum removed the Morton Cranial Collection from public view; the collection includes the skulls of enslaved individuals. Samuel George Morton, a popular physician, was a founder of scientific racism, and used his collection to "prove" the alleged inferiority of what he called "the African race".	
John Wayne exhibit, University of Southern California	Los Angeles	California	United States	Jul 10, 2020	John Wayne attended the University of Southern California; white supremacist remarks of his have recently surfaced. The display was moved to the Cinematic Arts Library.	
Tate Britain	London	England	United Kingdom	Aug 4, 2020	Tate Britain's Rex Whistler Restaurant featured a large mural by Rex Whistler entitled The Expedition in Pursuit of Rare Meats (1927). One of its scenes depicts the enslavement of a black child and his mother's distress; another shows him running behind a horse and cart to which he is attached by a chain around his neck. The room was closed and will only reopen (as an exhibition space) when "interpretive material" to put the work's offensive nature into its wider historical context is incorporated.	

== School mascots and logos ==
School	Old	New	Location	US state	Reported	Executed	Details	Ref.
Western Connecticut State University	Colonials	Wolves	Danbury	Connecticut	Jun 8, 2020	Apr 19, 2022	The university formed a committee to determine a new mascot and narrowed it down to five choices, with a vote from students, faculty, and alumni choosing the new mascot to be the wolves.	
Richland High School	Rebel	Royals	North Richland Hills	Texas	Jun 19, 2020	Sep 25, 2020	The school board voted to change the Rebel mascot and associated imagery. Change.org petition to "Abolish Confederate Branding at Richland High School" had amassed over 26,000 signatures. Some changes in the campus area are to be executed immediately.	
Quartz Hill High School	Rebel	Royals	Quartz Hill	California	Jun 20, 2020	Jun 20, 2020	Antelope Valley Union High School District administrators announced to the removal of both the Rebel mascot and name, effective immediately. Change.org petition to remove the mascot had amassed over 5,000 signatures.	
A. B. Miller High School	Rebel	Rebels	Fontana	California	Jun 24, 2020		School administration decided to remove the mascot and halt usage of the phrase "Rebel Nation", effective immediately.	
Brighton Central School District	Baron	Bruins	Brighton	New York	Jun 24, 2020	Dec 23, 2020	Superintendent stated that "[t]he Baron is a symbol of elitism and privilege at best and can be historically traced to slavery", and announced that the search for a new mascot would begin.	
Serra High School	Conquistadors	Rattlers	San Diego	California	Jun 25, 2020	Mar 9, 2021	Answering a petition started in June by sisters who were students of the high school, the San Diego Unified School Board renamed the school, as well as the mascot, from the Serra Conquistadors to Canyon Hills Rattlesnakes.	
Loudoun County High School	Raiders	Captains	Leesburg	Virginia	Jun 30, 2020	Jun 30, 2020	The school board voted unanimously to retire the mascot, which was based on the Confederate Mosby's Raiders.	
Martin High School	Indian hairdresser logo and associated decor	Rockin' M. logo and Warriors	Arlington	Texas	Jul 1, 2020	Jul 1, 2020		
Shady Side Academy	Indians	Bulldogs	Fox Chapel	Pennsylvania	Jul 1, 2020	Dec 21, 2020	The board of trustees voted unanimously to retire the school's mascot and team name. Academy President Bart Griffith announced there would be a process to select a new mascot in the months to come.	
Anderson High School	Redskins	Raptors	Hamilton County	Ohio	Jul 2, 2020	Mar 5, 2021	The board of the Forest Hills Local School District voted 4–1 to retire the Redskins name.	
Nashoba Regional High School	Chieftains	Wolves	Bolton	Massachusetts	Jul 4, 2020	Apr 12, 2021	The Nashoba Regional School Committee voted unanimously to retire the mascot and remove any Native American iconography from the high school.	
Parkwood High School	Rebels	Wolf Pack	Monroe	North Carolina	Jul 7, 2020	Nov 5, 2020	Union County Schools Board of Education voted 6–2 to change the name and mascot. An image of a Confederate soldier had been removed from the school logo earlier after the NAACP called for its change in 2009.	
Capital University	Crusaders	Comets	Bexley	Ohio	Jul 13, 2020	Sep 30, 2021	The board of trustees approved a measure to retire the Crusaders' nickname and the mascot Cappy. The name and mascot will continue to be used until an official retirement.	
Juanita High School	Rebels	Ravens	Kirkland	Washington	Jul 13, 2020	Dec 3, 2020	Lake Washington School District Superintendent Jon Holeman announced that the school's Rebels mascot would be removed immediately.	
Caledonia High School	Confederates	Cavaliers	Caledonia	Mississippi	Jul 17, 2020	Nov 16, 2020	The Lowndes County School Board voted to retire the nickname.	
Roncalli High School	Rebels	Royals	Indianapolis	Indiana	Jul 22, 2020	Jan 15, 2021	The school's interim president announced that the Rebels nickname would be retired due to "negative connotations" and that a task force would select a new mascot and nickname.	
Henderson High School	Indian logo	—	West Chester	Pennsylvania	Sep 18, 2020		"Echoing the broader national movement", the school's principal announced that it would be disassociating its athletic department from Native American imagery.	
Wilson Area School District	Indian hairdress logo and associated decor	Scripted "W" logo	Northampton County	Pennsylvania	Jul 26, 2021	Jul 26, 2021	"Amid escalating demands for racial justice, particularly following the murder of George Floyd," the school district announced that while it will still be using the Warriors mascot, it will no longer be purchasing uniforms or merchandise associated with the feathered headdress imagery that had been previously used.	

== Technology ==
Old	New	Role	Reported	Replaced	Details	Ref.
Alexis Ohanian	Michael Seibel	Board member of Reddit	Jun 5, 2020	Jun 10, 2020	Co-founder Ohanian announced that he was leaving the board, stating that he did so "as a father who needs to be able to answer his black daughter when she asks: 'What did you do?'", and asking the board to "fill [his] seat with a black candidate".	

== Television and streaming ==
=== Cancellations ===
Series		Canceled	Details	Ref.
Cops logo	Cops	Jun 9, 2020	In June 2020, Paramount Network pulled the program from its schedule in response to national protests against Floyd's murder and announced its cancellation days later. The program remains in production for its international and overseas partners, and began to film anew in Spokane County, Washington with its sheriff's department at the start of October 2020. In September 2021, it was announced that Fox Nation, the sister streaming service of the show's original network, Fox, picked up the show. The 33rd season premiered on October 1, 2021.	
Live PD logo	Live PD Live PD: Police Nation Live PD Presents: PD Cam	Jun 10, 2020	Live PD aired its last episode on May 23, 2020. The show had removed video footage of the killing of Javier Ambler, which took place in March 2019. Other shows in the Live PD franchise were also canceled. Because A&E sometimes relied on shows from the Live PD franchise for over 85% of its programming, the network's viewership has plummeted to about half of what it was compared to the previous year. The show's producers then moved to Reelz, where they launched a similar show, On Patrol: Live with most of the previous on-air personnel and cooperating departments in July 2022, and itself is part of an infringement lawsuit with A&E's parent, A&E Networks.	

=== Removals from or additions to streaming services ===
Series/film		Episode(s)	Reported	Details	Ref.
Little Britain logo	Little Britain Come Fly with Me	all	Jun 8, 2020	Netflix pulled Little Britain and the BBC and BritBox followed three days later. The show has "long been criticized for its portrayal of black and Asian characters by the white comedians, as well as gay characters and those with disabilities". (Note: Controversial characters include "an obese Caribbean woman called Desiree, for which [David] Walliams wore blackface, ... a mail-order bride named Ting Tong, [and] Daffyd, 'the only gay in the village', and Lou and Andy, the latter of whom was in a wheelchair.") Netflix also pulled another show that contained blackface, Come Fly with Me, by the same creators. On 16 March 2022, the BBC made Little Britain available to view on BBC iPlayer again with some characters being cut from the original release.	
Clark Gable and Vivien Leigh in Gone with the Wind	Gone with the Wind	—N/a	Jun 9, 2020	HBO Max pulled the film because it "depicts some of the ethnic and racial prejudices that have, unfortunately, been commonplace in American society"; the service "felt that to keep this title up without an explanation and a denouncement of those depictions would be irresponsible". The film was eventually reinstated with an introduction by cinema professor Jacqueline Stewart explaining its depiction of a "world of grace and beauty, without acknowledging the brutalities of the system of chattel slavery upon which this world is based". The original content of the film is available on VHS, DVD, and Blu-ray.	
Chris Lilley, creator of the four series	Angry Boys Jonah from Tonga Summer Heights High We Can Be Heroes	all	Jun 10, 2020	Netflix pulled four Chris Lilley shows for using blackface, brownface, and yellowface. In what was characterized as a "defiant move", Lilley shared a deleted scene from Jonah from Tonga online.	
	Bo' Selecta!	all	Jun 10, 2020	All 4 pulled the show after comedian Leigh Francis tearfully apologized for having "portrayed many black celebrities" on the show using latex facemasks.	
	The League of Gentlemen The Mighty Boosh	all	Jun 10, 2020	Netflix pulled the shows because they contained characters "played by white actors wearing blackface": Papa Lazarou in The League of Gentlemen and The Spirit of Jazz in The Mighty Boosh.	
	Fawlty Towers	S01E06: "The Germans"	Jun 11, 2020	After UKTV pulled the episode because it "contains racial slurs", show creator John Cleese called the people running the BBC "a mixture of marketing people and petty bureaucrats" who were "cowardly and gutless". Cleese explained that the character using the slurs "was an old fossil left over from decades before" and said, "We were not supporting his views, we were making fun of them". UKTV later stated they would reinstate the episode along with guidance noting that it contained "potentially offensive content and language".	
It's Always Sunny in Philadelphia logo	It's Always Sunny in Philadelphia	S04E03: / "America's Next Top Paddy's Billboard Model Contest"; S06E09: / "Dee Reynolds: Shaping America's Youth"; S08E02: / "The Gang Recycles Their Trash"; S09E09: / "The Gang Makes Lethal Weapon 6"; S14E03: / "Dee Day"	Jun 11, 2020 (Note: S06E09 was the first episode to be pulled, with the others being pulled over the next few days.)	Netflix, Hulu and Star on Disney+ (despite Disney+ not streaming the series on its Star hub previously but the mentioned episodes are not streaming on Disney+ in Australia, New Zealand and Canada) pulled five episodes that contained brownface or blackface. With the exception of "Dee Day", the episodes mentioned are available on DVD.	
Million Dollar Extreme Presents: World Peace Logo	Million Dollar Extreme Presents: World Peace	all	Jun 12, 2020	Cartoon Network and Adult Swim pulled the series from their streaming services, due to allegations from sources of "coded racial messages, including swastikas" being found in the original cut of the show.	
	W/ Bob & David	S01E03: "Episode 3"	Jun 16, 2020	Netflix pulled the episode that included a sketch called "Know Your Rights", which featured blackface "in an attempt to satirize police brutality". Before removal, David Cross, who portrayed the character who wore blackface, stated, "The point of this was to underscore the absurdity...well, here's your last chance to figure it out".	
30 Rock logo	30 Rock	S03E02: "Believe in the Stars"; S05E04: "Live Show" (Note: East Coast version only.); S05E10: "Christmas Attack Zone"; S06E19: "Live from Studio 6H"	Jun 22, 2020	Tina Fey and NBCUniversal requested the pulling of four episodes that used blackface. (Note: The East Coast version of Live Show had a scene that was described as "[m]ore of a case of 'Blackhand' than 'blackface', with a character played by Jon Hamm "get[ting] a hand transplant from a black man from death row, whose hands then try to strangle him".) All four episodes mentioned are available on DVD and Blu-ray.	
	Scrubs	~~S03E07: "My Fifteen Seconds"~~ (Note: This episode had been previously reported to have been pulled, even though it had not been, as the episode contains no blackface.); S03E08: "My Friend the Doctor"; S05E04: "My Jiggly Ball"; S05E17: "My Chopped Liver"	Jun 24, 2020	Hulu pulled the episodes, which contained instances of blackface, at the request of show creator Bill Lawrence and ABC Studios. "My Chopped Liver" also contained an instance of whiteface. All three episodes mentioned are available on DVD. The episodes are also still available on Disney+ Canada.	
	Community	S02E14: "Advanced Dungeons & Dragons"	Jun 26, 2020	Netflix and Hulu announced the pulling of the episode, which included a scene that contained blackface. Producer Sony Pictures Television supported the decision. The episode mentioned is available on DVD and Blu-ray.	
The Office logo	The Office	S09E09: / "Dwight Christmas" (one scene therein)	Jun 26, 2020	Show creator Greg Daniels edited out a scene that contained blackface. The episode that has this scene intact is available on DVD and Blu-ray.	
The Golden Girls logo	The Golden Girls	S03E23: "Mixed Blessings"	Jun 27, 2020	Hulu pulled the episode which included a scene which supposedly involved blackface. However, it was later clarified in a Vulture article that the characters in the scene in question were actually wearing mud masks. Hulu would eventually end up reinstating the episode.	
	Peep Show	S02E01: / "Dance Class" (one scene therein)	Jun 29, 2020	Netflix removed a scene containing blackface.	
	Bluey	S01E48: "Teasing"; S02E24: "Flat Pack"	Aug 20, 2020	Disney+ and ABC Australia pulled the two episodes from their services due to the negative depictions of Aboriginal Australians, despite changing the stereotypical dialogues for subsequent broadcasts. The two episodes mentioned are available on DVD and Blu-ray.	
	Aqua Teen Hunger Force	S06E02: "Shake Like Me"	Sep 29, 2020	Cartoon Network and Adult Swim pulled the episode from their rerun rotation and streaming services, whose plot was described as an "animated equivalent of blackface". The episode is still available on Aqua Teen Volume 6 DVD. The episode is not included on the Aqua Teen Hunger Force: The Baffler Meal Complete Collection DVD.	
	The Boondocks	S03E04: "The Story of Jimmy Rebel"	Sep 29, 2020	Cartoon Network and Adult Swim intentionally excluded the episode from their streaming services due to perceived racial insensitivities over the episode's portrayal of a racist country singer named Jimmy Rebel (a parody of real-life white supremacist country singer Johnny Rebel). The episode is still available on DVD.	

=== Other changes ===
Series		Announced	Details	Ref.
Law & Order: Special Victims Unit logo	Law & Order: Special Victims Unit	Jun 2, 2020	Writer Craig Gore was fired after posting a photo of himself armed with a rifle and threatening to "light motherfuckers up who are trying to fuck w/ my property" during the protests. Dick Wolf, creator and executive producer of the Law & Order franchise, stated, "I will not tolerate this conduct, especially during our hour of national grief. I am terminating Craig Gore immediately." Gore's talent agency, Paradigm, also dropped him as a client.	
	L.A.'s Finest	Jun 8, 2020	Spectrum postponed the show's second-season premiere to an unspecified date later in 2020.	
	Body Cam	Jun 9, 2020	A spokesperson for Investigation Discovery stated that the show was "off the schedule for the foreseeable future". The show returned to the schedule the following year.	
Brooklyn Nine-Nine logo	Brooklyn Nine-Nine	Jun 23, 2020	The final season of the series (season 8) was reworked, and four already-made episodes were put aside.	
	The Amazing Race Big Brother Love Island Survivor Tough as Nails	Nov 9, 2020	CBS announced that in upcoming seasons of their unscripted reality series, 50% of the cast will consist of people of color.	

== Voice acting ==
=== Casting changes in television ===
Old	New	Series	Role(s)	Reported	Details	Ref.
Jenny Slate	Ayo Edebiri	Big Mouth	Missy Foreman-Greenwald	Jun 24, 2020 (Note: Recasting announced August 28, 2020)	Slate, a white and Jewish actress, announced that she would no longer voice the half-black character Missy Forman-Greenwald. The role went to Ayo Edebiri starting with the Season 4 episode, "Horority House", with Edebiri first voicing Missy's "Mirror Self" in the same episode. Slate continued to perform in the series voicing Caitlin Grafton and other characters.	
David Herman (Marshmallow) Katie Crown (Harley) Melissa Bardin Galsky (Ms. Jacobson) Pamela Adlon (Olsen Benner)	Jari Jones (Marshmallow) Ashley Nicole Black (Harley, Ms. Jacobson) Nicole Byer (Olsen Benner)	Bob's Burgers	Marshmallow Harley Ms. Jacobson Olsen Benner	Jun 24, 2020	Series creator Loren Bouchard announced on Twitter that David Herman will no longer play the black transgender sex worker Marshmallow in the future after replying to a tweet about recasting Marshmallow with "Yes. On it". Jari Jones has since taken over the role of Marshmallow. The role of Ms. Jacobson was later recast to Ashley Nicole Black from Melissa Bardin Galsky. Bouchard also announced on Twitter that Katie Crown will no longer play the black student Harley in the future as well. Crown and Melissa Bardin Galsky had their respective roles of Harley and Ms. Jacobson recast to Ashley Nicole Black. Starting in The Bob's Burgers Movie, Pamela Adlon's role of Olsen Benner was recast to Nicole Byer.	
Kristen Bell	Emmy Raver-Lampman	Central Park	Molly Tillerman	Jun 24, 2020 (Note: Recasting announced July 24, 2020)	The series' producers announced that a biracial or black actress would play the biracial Molly in the future. Bell wrote, "This is a time to acknowledge our acts of complicity ... Casting a mixed race character w[ith] a white actress undermines the specificity of the mixed race & Black American experience." Bell would then later voice a new character, Abby Hunter starting with the Season 3 episode, "Paige's Next Chapter".	
Mike Henry	Arif Zahir	Family Guy	Cleveland Brown	Jun 26, 2020 (Note: Recasting announced September 25, 2020)	After voicing Cleveland Brown for twenty-one years on both Family Guy and its spin-off series, The Cleveland Show from 2009 to 2013, Mike Henry announced his departure on social media when he posted a statement saying; "I love this character, but persons of color should play characters of color. Therefore, I will be stepping down from the role." Arif Zahir began his role as Cleveland in season 20. Henry continues to work and perform on the series after stepping down from voicing Cleveland as Bruce Straight and John Herbert.	
Hank Azaria (Apu Nahasapeemapetilon, Carl Carlson, Officer Lou, Bumblebee Man, Julio Franco, Drederick Tatum, Fausto, Dr. Nick Riviera) Harry Shearer (Dr. Julius Hibbert, Judge Roy Snyder, Sanjay Nahasapeemapetilon) Pamela Hayden (Lewis Clark, Janey Powell) Tress MacNeille (Manjula Nahasapeemapetilon, Kumiko Albertson, Bernice Hibbert, Opal, Hubert Wong, Cookie Kwan)	Alex Désert (Carl Carlson, Officer Lou, Fausto) Eric Lopez (Bumblebee Man, Dr. Nick Riviera) Tony Rodríguez (Julio Franco) Jay Pharoah (Drederick Tatum) Kevin Michael Richardson (Dr. Julius Hibbert, Judge Roy Snyder) Kimberly Brooks (Lewis Clark, Janey Powell) Jenny Yokobori (Kumiko Albertson) Dawnn Lewis (Bernice Hibbert, Opal) Rosalie Chiang (Hubert Wong) Sunil Malhotra (Apu Nahasapeemapetilon) Janina Gavankar (Manjula Nahasapeemapetilon)	The Simpsons	All non-white originated roles	Jun 26, 2020	Starting with Season 32, series producers stated that white actors would no longer voice non-white characters. These included recurring characters that were originally voiced by Azaria, Shearer, Hayden, and MacNeille. Azaria had previously stepped down from voicing Apu Nahasapeemapetilon in January 2020 due to controversy surrounding the character since the 2017 documentary The Problem with Apu from Indian-American comedian Hari Kondabolu.	
Rob Paulsen	Sérgio Stern	Mickey Mouse universe	José Carioca	Jun 30, 2020	During an interview with The A.V. Club, Rob Paulsen says he will no longer voice characters of color including the Brazilian José Carioca, who he first voiced since Mickey Mouse Works in 1999. Sérgio Stern voiced José in the theme parks and the Brazilian Portuguese dubs since 2013 and later voiced him in the English-speaking regions starting with the Mickey Mouse Funhouse episode, "Día de los Muertos".	

=== Casting changes due to controversies ===
Old	New	Series	Role(s)	Reported	Details	Ref.
Stuart Daniel Baker	Tracy Morgan	Squidbillies	Early Cuyler	Aug 16, 2020 (Note: Recasting announced October 20, 2021)	Stuart "Unknown Hinson" Baker was fired from the series for controversial comments towards the Black Lives Matter movement and country singer Dolly Parton. A response posted on Facebook by Baker claimed that being fired from Squidbillies ruined his life. The response was later deleted. The thirteenth and final season of Squidbillies premiered on November 7, 2021, with Baker being replaced by Tracy Morgan.	

== Other changes ==
=== Games ===
Game		Reported	Details	Ref.
	Magic: The Gathering	Jun 10, 2020	Wizards of the Coast announced that it was pulling seven cards, including "Invoke Prejudice", (Note: This card was originally given the ID number 1488.) "Cleanse", (Note: This card had the ability to "[d]estroy all black creatures".) "Jihad", and "Pradesh Gypsies", after being accused of "pervasive ongoing racism" not only in its card design but also in its employment practices. The announcement did not address the employment issues.	
	Dungeons & Dragons	Jun 17, 2020	Wizards of the Coast admitted that "some of the peoples in the games—orcs and drow being two of the prime examples—have been characterized as monstrous and evil", and committed to making changes, such as depicting "orcs and drow [as] just as morally and culturally complex as other peoples" in their books and "proactively seeking new, diverse talent to join [their] staff".	
Fortnite logo	Fortnite	Jun 17, 2020	Players noted the removal of police cars from the game as early as June 17, 2020. Developer Epic Games declined to comment, though an unnamed person "familiar with the game's development" stated, "I wouldn't say it's a political statement. I think it's just us being sensitive about the issues many people in our audience are dealing with." Cars were not functional within the game, so the removal of police cars was merely a cosmetic change.	
Forza logo	Forza	Jun 26, 2020	Turn 10 Studios updated their enforcement guidelines in Forza games to include the Confederate flag under "Notorious iconography" and administer a ban for any further use under any circumstances. The games are known for their livery editors where players could create thousands of layers of graphics to draw shapes, letters, and pictures. A prominent use of the flag in-game was to create virtual replicas of the General Lee from The Dukes of Hazzard.	
Scrabble logo	Scrabble	Jul 7, 2020	Hasbro and the North American Scrabble Players Association agreed to remove 225 words from official Scrabble competition. Hasbro said it will "make clear that slurs are not permissible in any form of the game."	

=== Other products ===
Product	Country	Reported	Executed	Details	Ref.
Límpido (bleach)	Colombia	Jun 19, 2020	Jun 19, 2020	The parent company Clorox stated that the brand would no longer use the image of "Blanquita", a character derived from the "mammy" racial stereotype.	
Good Humor (ice cream)	United States	Aug 13, 2020	Aug 13, 2020	The ice cream company hired RZA from the Wu-Tang Clan to create a jingle to replace the familiar "Turkey in the Straw" melody heard in its ice cream trucks because of the early 19th-century folk song's associations with minstrel shows, blackface and racist lyrics.	
Hallmark	United States	Aug 27, 2020	Aug 27, 2020	In wake of the retheming of Splash Mountain, Hallmark pulled a Mickey Mouse ornament that played "Zip-a-Dee-Doo-Dah" from its 2020 ornament line-up.	
Fred Perry (clothing)	United Kingdom	Sep 24, 2020	Sep 24, 2020	The clothing company announced they are retiring the Black/Yellow/Yellow twin tipped shirt that was "appropriated" by the Proud Boys.	

=== Non-products ===
Item changed		Location	Reported	Details	Ref.
	Skin tone preferences	Shaadi.com	Jun 11, 2020	The decision was made due to a petition shared online on the basis of eliminating colorism.	
	Reference to the Robert E. Lee Tree	Sequoia and Kings Canyon National Park's website	Jun 23, 2020	The name of the Robert E. Lee tree was removed from a website listing the world's largest sequoias in order to "promote inclusiveness." The name of the tree cannot be changed without the approval of either Congress or the leadership of the National Park Service.	
ΔΤΔ	Delta Tau Delta fraternity, Lambda chapter	Vanderbilt University, Nashville, TN	Jul 15, 2020	Members of the fraternity disbanded their chapter and called for disbanding the "Interfraternity Council and Pan-Hellenic System" because "[h]istorically white Greek Life is an institution that has wielded an enormous amount of social, academic and financial capital in a way that has done immense personal and structural harm to our fellow classmates." The move comes amid "[n]ationwide social justice movements that have taken place over the past few months."	
	Ethnic and social justice studies requirement	California State University system	Jul 23, 2020	The Cal State Board of Trustees approved making a one-course graduation requirement in ethnic and social justice studies. The first change in Cal State's general education curriculum in over 40 years, it will be required from the 2023–2024 academic year.	
	Frölunda HC logo and nickname	Gothenburg, Sweden	Sep 17, 2020	The Swedish Hockey League ice hockey team announced that they would stop using the Frölunda Indians moniker as well as its logo depicting a Native American. Due to financial and practical reasons, however, the team continued to use their current jerseys for the 2020–21 SHL season. After backlash from a proposed redesign in February 2022, the team updated their logo in April 20, 2022.	
	Mutual of Omaha logo	Omaha, Nebraska	Nov 12, 2020	The insurance and finance company retired its 70-year-old Indian chief head logo, replacing it with an African lion, partly as a nod to its long-time sponsorship of the television program Wild Kingdom.	
	Andrew Jackson Parade Float	Tallahassee, Florida	Sep 15, 2020	A parade float depicting Andrew Jackson at Springtime Tallahassee was replaced "to align with sweeping calls nationwide to remove controversial figures from public spaces, particularly those deemed racially offensive." In particular, Jackson's enslavement of about 160 souls and signing of the Indian Removal Act, that displaced indigenous people in the Trail of Tears.	

== See also ==
- Weinstein effect
- List of name changes due to the George Floyd protests
- List of monuments and memorials removed during the George Floyd protests
