= Richfield Township, Michigan =

Richfield Township is may refer to the following places in the U.S. state of Michigan:

- Richfield Township, Genesee County, Michigan
- Richfield Township, Roscommon County, Michigan

== See also ==
- Richfield Township (disambiguation)
- Richland Township, Michigan (disambiguation)
- Richmond Township, Michigan (disambiguation)
