= Richmond station =

Richmond station may refer to:

== Australia ==
- Richmond railway station, Melbourne, Victoria
- Richmond railway station, Sydney, New South Wales
- Richmond railway station, Queensland
- East Richmond railway station (disambiguation)
- North Richmond railway station, Melbourne, Australia
- West Richmond railway station, Melbourne, Victoria

== Canada ==
- Grand Trunk station (Richmond), Quebec

== New Zealand ==
- Richmond railway station, New Zealand, in Richmond, New Zealand

== United Kingdom ==
- Richmond station (London), served by London Underground and National Rail
- Richmond railway station (North Yorkshire) - no longer in service, but re-opened late 2007 as a community and commercial centre.

== United States ==
- Richmond station (California), served by Bay Area Rapid Transit and Amtrak
- Richmond Main Street Station, a train station in Richmond, Virginia
- Richmond Staples Mill Road station, a train station in Richmond, Virginia
- Richmond station (Atchison, Topeka and Santa Fe Railway), a former train station in Richmond, California
- Richmond station, a former station in the Richmond Railroad Station Historic District in Richmond, Indiana
- Richmond station (Chesapeake and Ohio Railway), a former train station in Richmond, Indiana
- Richmond station (Pennsylvania Railroad), in Richmond, Illinois

== See also ==
- Richmond (disambiguation)
- Richmond Field Station, a research center in Richmond, California operated by the University of California, Berkeley
- Richmond Hill station (disambiguation)
