= Richemont (disambiguation) =

Richemont may refer to:

== Companies ==
- Compagnie Financière Richemont SA, a Switzerland-based holding company

== Places in France ==
Richemont is the name of some communes in France:

- Richemont, Moselle, in the Moselle département
- Richemont, Seine-Maritime, in the Seine-Maritime département
- Richemont (Charente), former French commune in the Charente, now belong to Cherves-Richemont
- Saint-Crépin-de-Richemont in Dordogne
- Cherves-Richemont in Charente

== See also ==
- Castel of Richemont of Saint-Crépin-de-Richemont
- Château de Richemont of Villette-sur-Ain
- Castel of Richemont (Charente) of Cherves-Richemont
- Richmond (disambiguation)

== People ==
- Arthur de Richemont, French military chief in the Hundred Years' War and duke of Brittany
- Camus de Richemont, French military chief and baron d' Empire
- Eugène Desbassayns de Richemont (1800–1859), French colonial administrator and inventor
- Pierre Desbassyns de Richemont (1833–1912), French archaeologist and politician
