= Heidberg-Melverode =

- Borough of Braunschweig
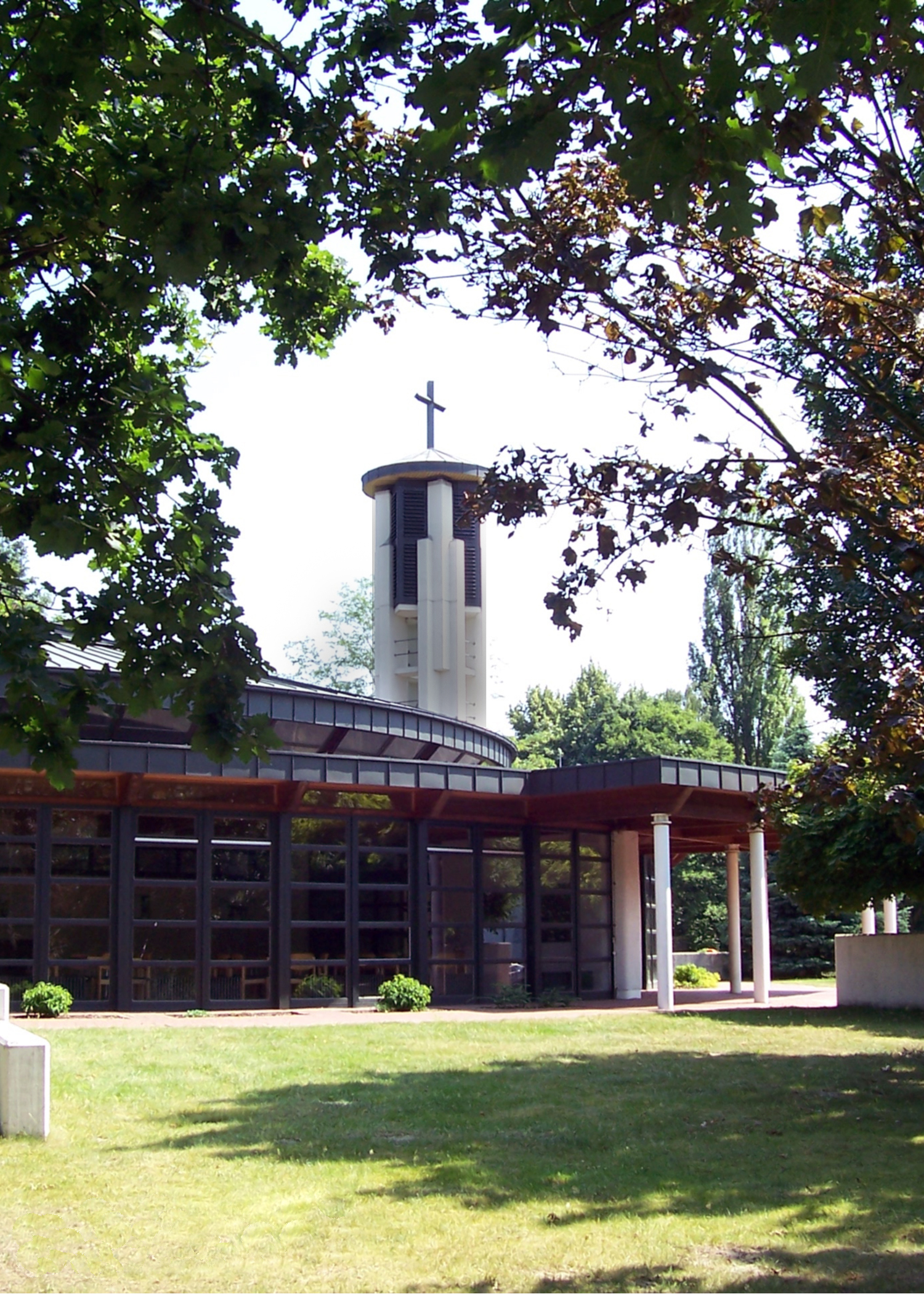
- St. Thomas' Church in Heidberg

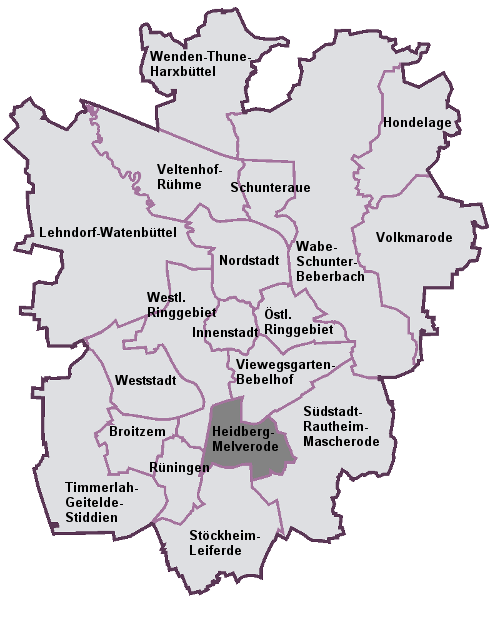
- Location of Heidberg-Melverode within Braunschweig
- Interactive map of Heidberg-Melverode
- Location within Germany Location within Lower Saxony
- Coordinates: 52°13′50″N 10°31′56″E
- Country: Germany
- State: Lower Saxony
- District: urban district
- City: Braunschweig

Government
  - Mayor: Hans-Dieter Osswald (SPD)

Area
  - Total: 03.70 km^{2} (1.43 sq mi)

Population (2020-12-31)
  - Total: 11,419
  - Density: 3,090/km^{2} (7,990/sq mi)
- Time zone: UTC+01:00 (CET)
  - Summer (DST): UTC+02:00 (CEST)
- Postal codes: 38124
- Dialling codes: 0531
- Vehicle registration: BS

Heidberg-Melverode is a Stadtbezirk (borough) in the southern part of Braunschweig, Germany.

The Stadtbezirk comprises the quarters Heidberg and Melverode.

== History ==
Melverode is at least 1100 years old, but was first mentioned in documents in 1007. The village was incorporated into Braunschweig in 1934.

In contrast, Heidberg was only developed, on land which was formerly part of the village of Melverode, as a new residential area in 1958.

== Sights and landmarks ==
The Baroque palace Schloss Richmond ("Richmond Palace") lies in the north of the district. The palace was built between 1768 and 1769, with a surrounding English garden planned by Lancelot "Capability" Brown, for Princess Augusta of Great Britain, wife of Charles William Ferdinand, Duke of Brunswick-Wolfenbüttel, to remind her of her home in England.

Located to the north of Schloss Richmond are the buildings of the former Academy for Youth Leadership (German: Akademie für Jugendführung) of the Hitler Youth, which today houses a school for adult education.

One of the most notable buildings in Melverode is the 13th century, late Romanesque church St. Nikolai. Also located in Melverode is the artificial lake and recreation area Südsee. Another artificial lake in the district is the Heidbergsee, located in the Heidbergpark.

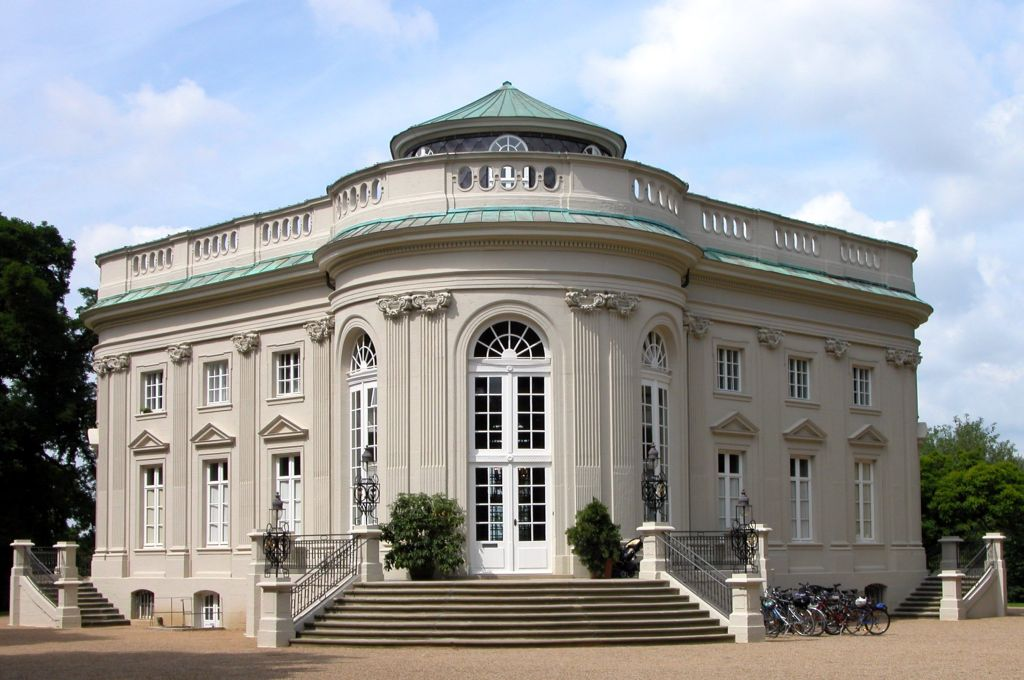
Schloss Richmond

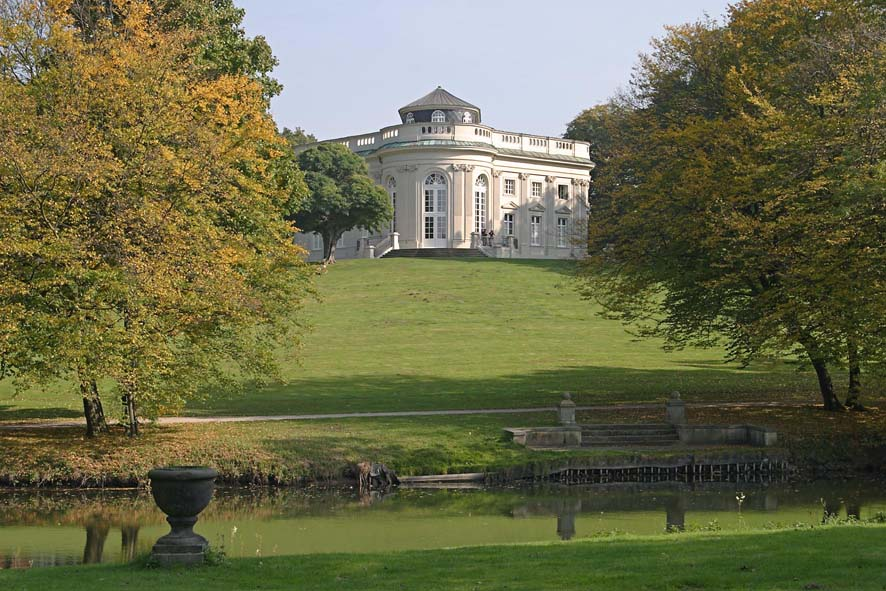
Schloss Richmond and garden

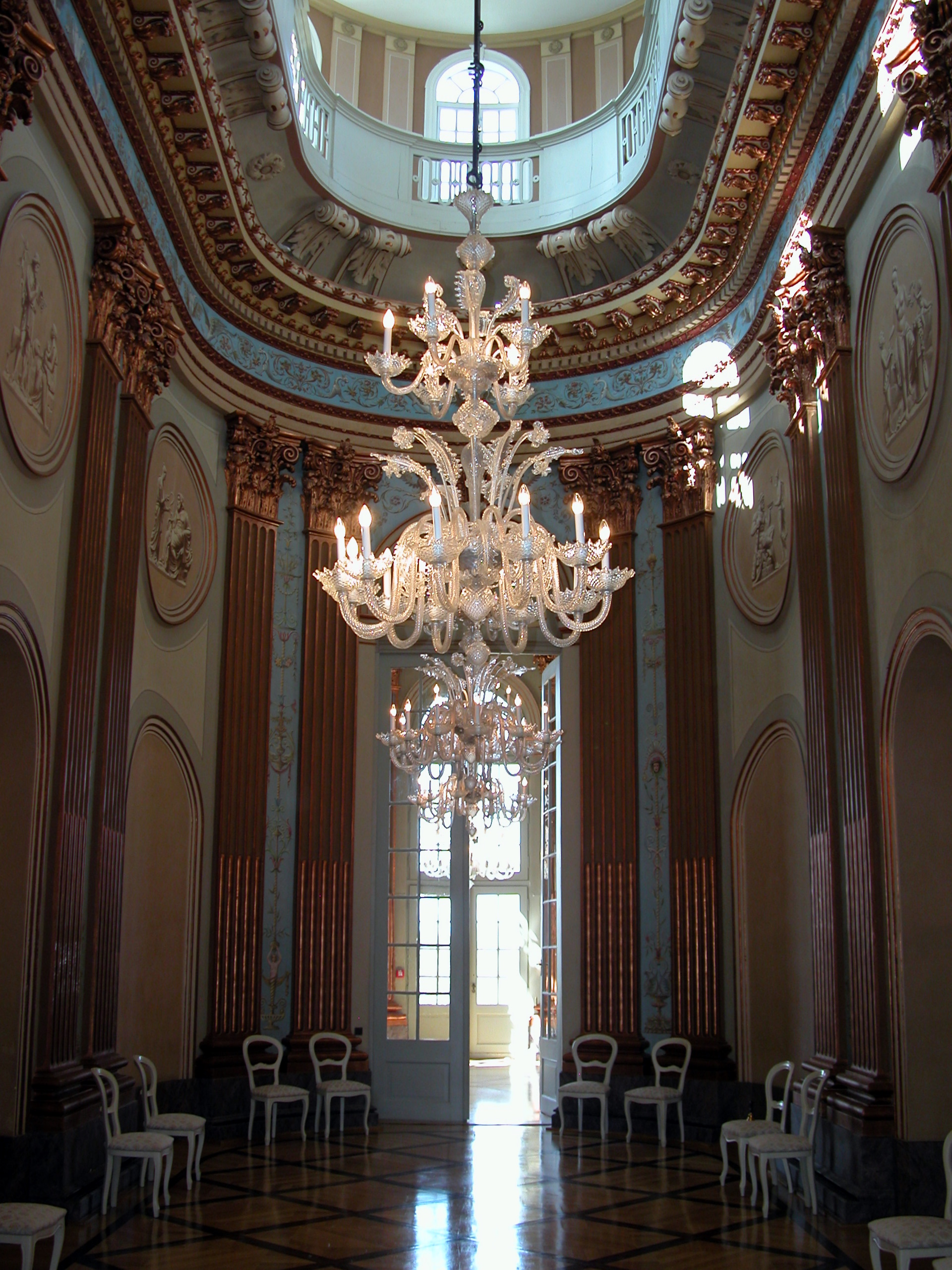
Schloss Richmond interior

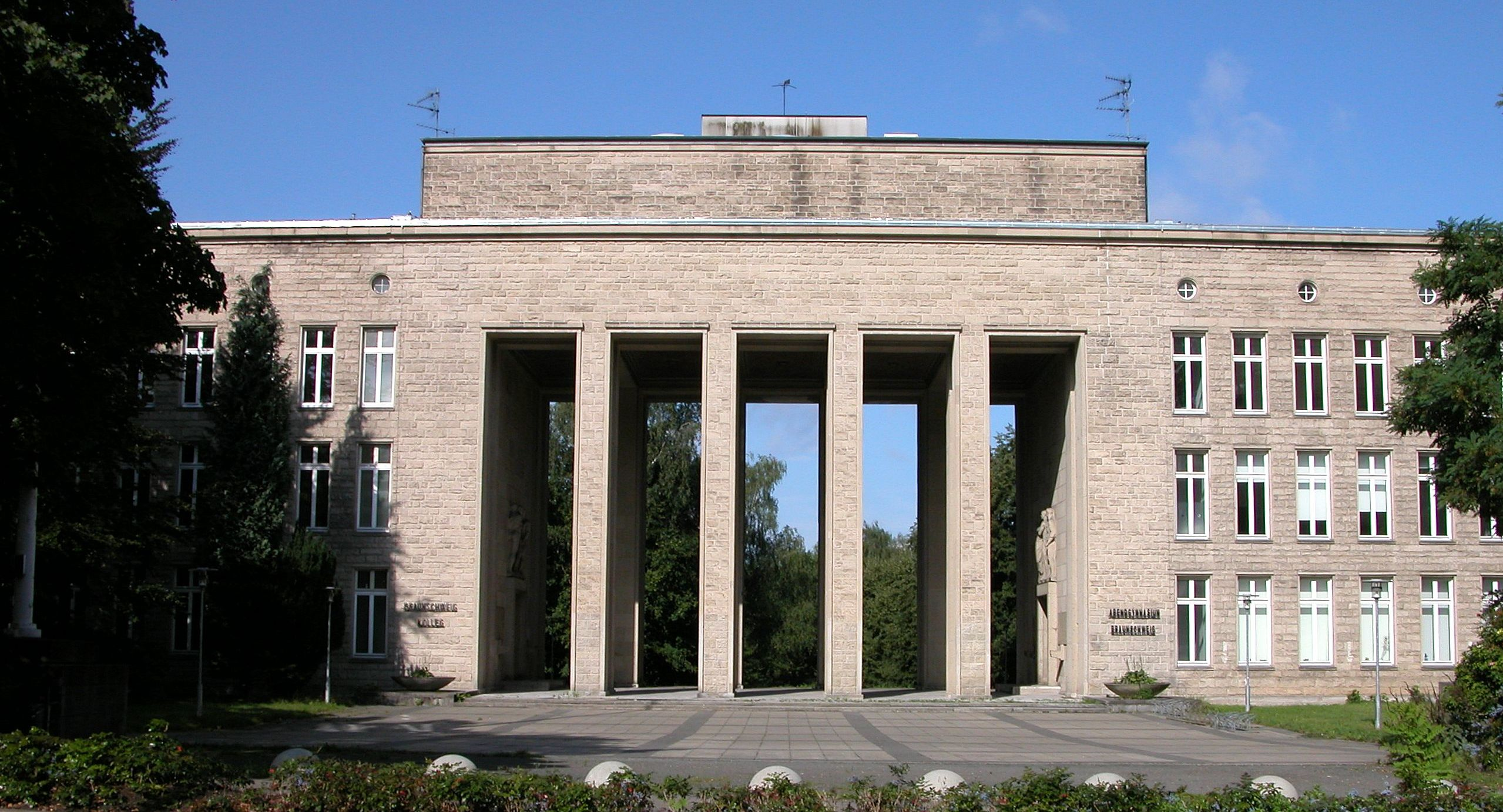
Former Academy for Youth Leadership

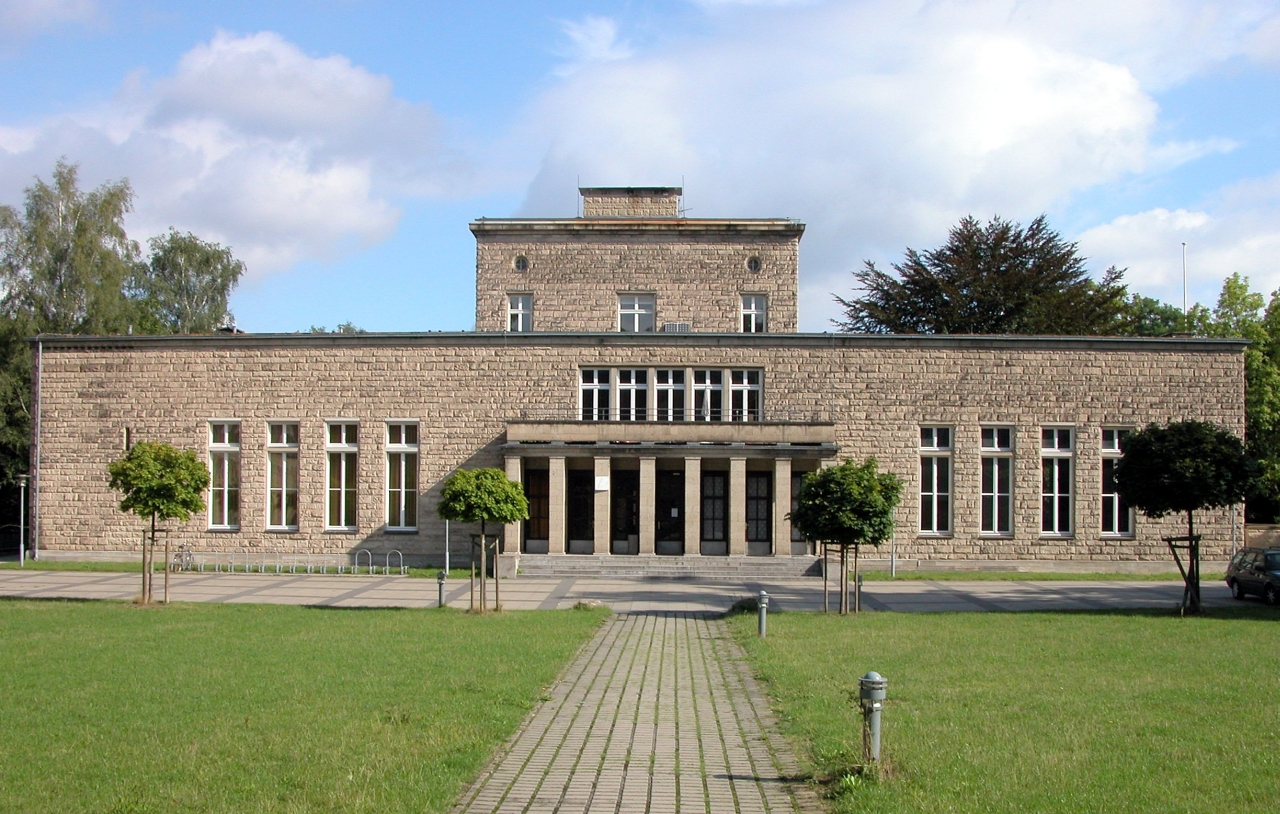
Former Academy for Youth Leadership, view from the south

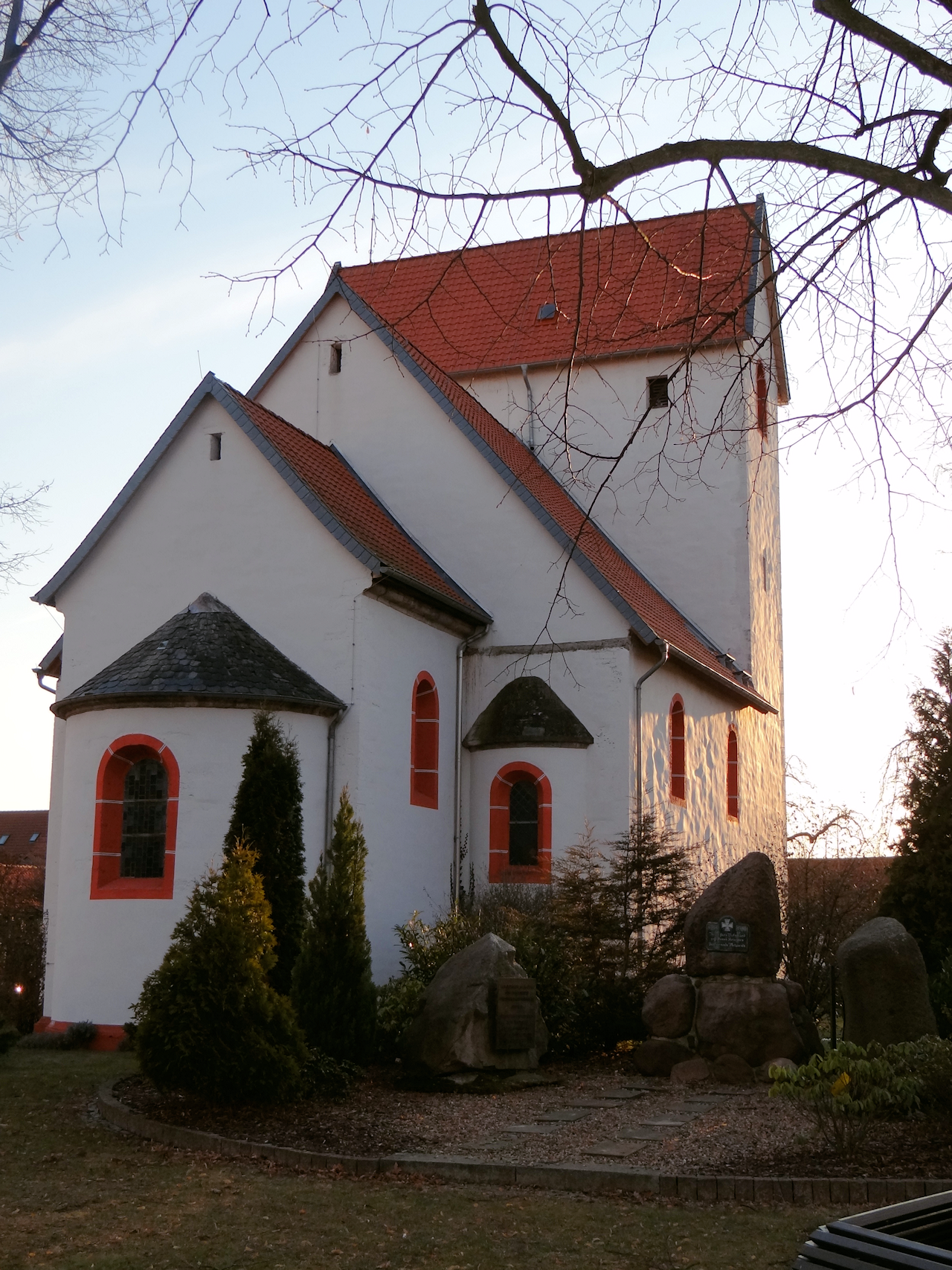
St. Nikolai

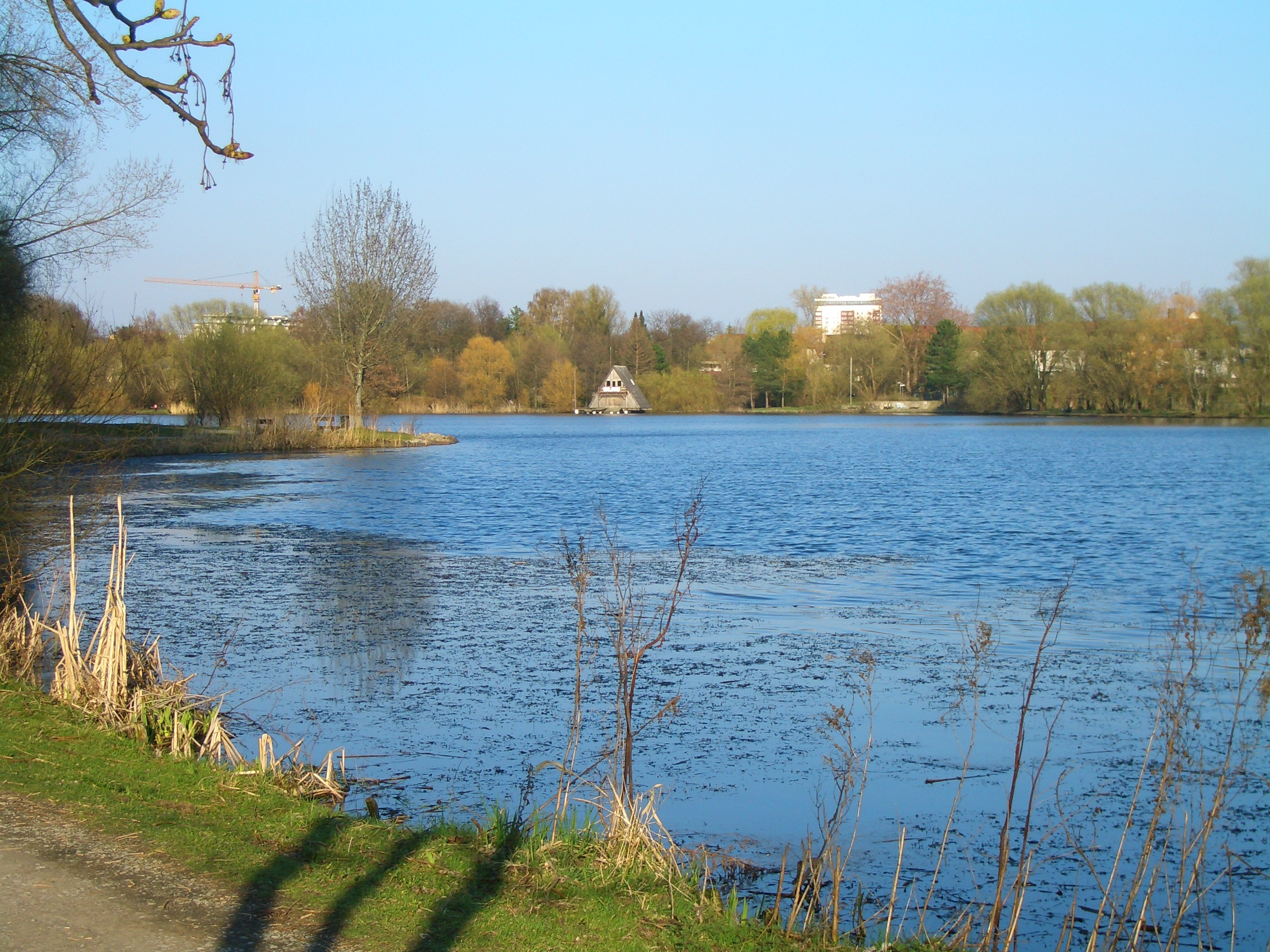
Südsee

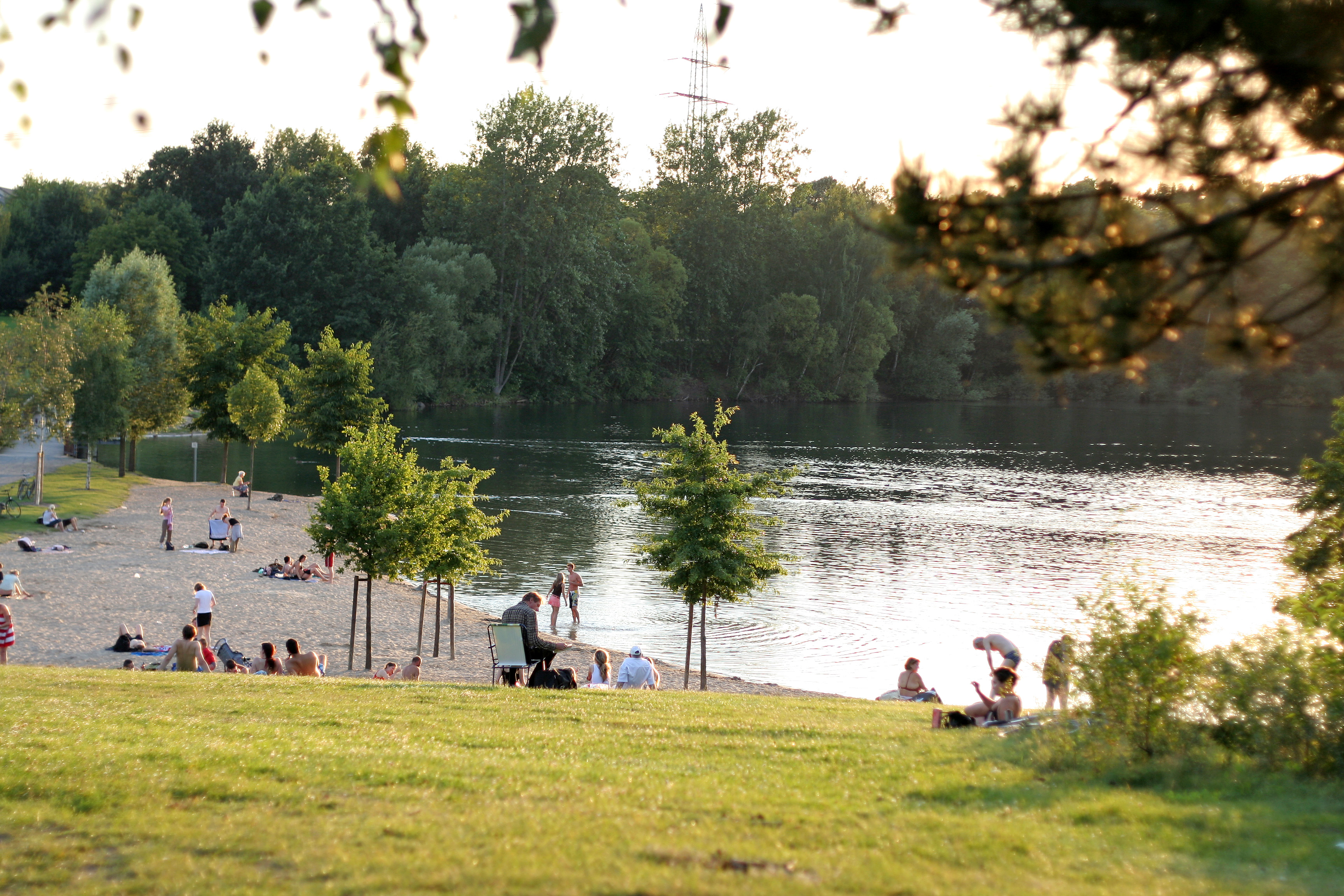
Heidbergsee

== Politics ==
The district mayor Hans-Dieter Osswald is a member of the Social Democratic Party of Germany.

== Sports ==
Heidberg is home to the association football club Leu Braunschweig and rugby union club Welfen SC Braunschweig.

== Coats of arms ==
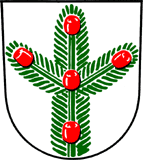
Coat of arms of Heidberg

Coat of arms of Melverode
