= Borough of Richmond =

Borough of Richmond or Richmond Borough may refer to:

- Former name of the Borough of Staten Island in New York City, New York, US
- Municipal Borough of Richmond (Surrey), England, UK
  - London Borough of Richmond upon Thames, its successor
- Municipal Borough of Richmond, Yorkshire, England, UK; which was merged into Richmondshire, North Yorkshire
- Richmond Borough, New Zealand (1891–1989), borough for the town of Richmond, New Zealand

== See also ==
- Richmond (disambiguation)
