= Richlands =

Richlands may refer to:

== Australia ==
- Richlands, Queensland, a suburb in Brisbane (shared postcode 4077)

== United States ==
- Richlands, North Carolina
- Richlands, Virginia
- Richlands, West Virginia
- Richlands High School (North Carolina)
- Richlands High School (Richlands, Virginia)
