= HMS Richmond =

Seven ships of the Royal Navy have borne the name HMS Richmond, after the English town of Richmond, or numerous holders of the title of Duke of Richmond:

- HMS Richmond (1660) was a 26-gun ship launched in 1655 as Wakefield for the English Commonwealth Navy. She was renamed HMS Richmond at the Restoration in 1660 and was converted into a fireship between 1688 and 1689. She was sold in 1698.
- HMS Richmond (1672) was an 8-gun yacht purchased in 1672 and sold in 1685.
- HMS Richmond (1745) was a 24-gun sixth-rate, formerly the French East Indiaman Dauphin. She was captured in 1745 and sold in 1749.
- HMS Richmond (1757) was a 32-gun fifth-rate launched in 1757. She was captured by the French in 1781 and later burnt in 1783 to prevent capture by the Spanish
- HMS Richmond (1806) was a 14-gun gun-brig launched in 1806 and sold in 1814. She became the mercantile Ben Jonson, which was probably condemned at Mauritius in 1826.
- HMS Richmond (G88) was previously USS Fairfax (DD-93), transferred from the United States Navy as part of the 1940 Destroyers for Bases Agreement. She was lent to the Royal Canadian Navy in 1943, and then to the Soviet Navy in 1944. She was renamed Zhivuchi and served with them until 1949, when she was scrapped.
- HMS Richmond (F239) is a Type 23 frigate launched in 1993 and withdrawn from service in 2026.

== Battle honours ==
Ships named Richmond have earned the following battle honours:

- Quebec 1759
- Havana 1762
- Atlantic 1941–43
- Arctic 1942

== See also ==
- USS Richmond
