= Peter Joseph Krahe =

German architect

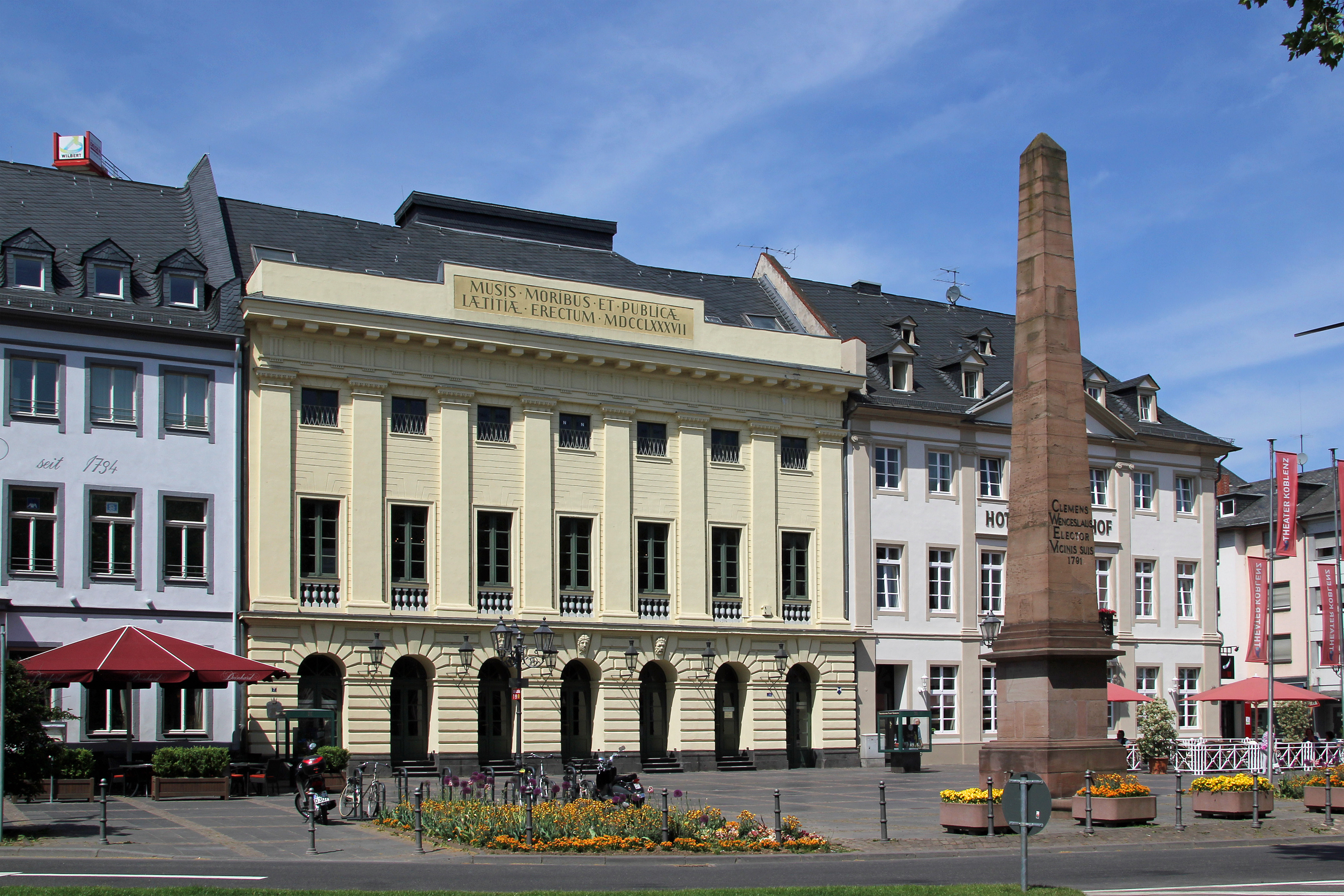
Theater Koblenz, Krahe's first project

Peter Joseph Krahe (8 April 1758, in Mannheim – 7 October 1840, in Braunschweig) was a German architect. He was instrumental in converting the old city walls and fortifications of Braunschweig into a series of parks and other public spaces.

== Life ==
He was the son of the well-known historical painter Lambert Krahe. In 1775, he became a student at the Kunstakademie Düsseldorf, which his father had helped to create. At the age of twenty-two, he became the Academy's youngest professor. Thanks to a grant from Elector Karl Theodor in 1782, he was able to spend a year studying in Rome. Upon returning, he set himself up as an architect. The years 1785 and 1786 were also spent in Italy, where he became an honorary professor at the Accademia di Belle Arti di Firenze. He first architectural project was a theater in Koblenz, commissioned by Elector Clemens Wenzeslaus of Saxony and completed in 1787. He was appointed Director of the City Planning Board there in 1790, but the post was abolished in 1795 when the area was occupied by the French Army. He then applied for a position as Court Architect in Hanover, but that area was also taken by French troops. As a result, he was forced to work at odd jobs, including tax collection.

=== Work in Braunschweig ===
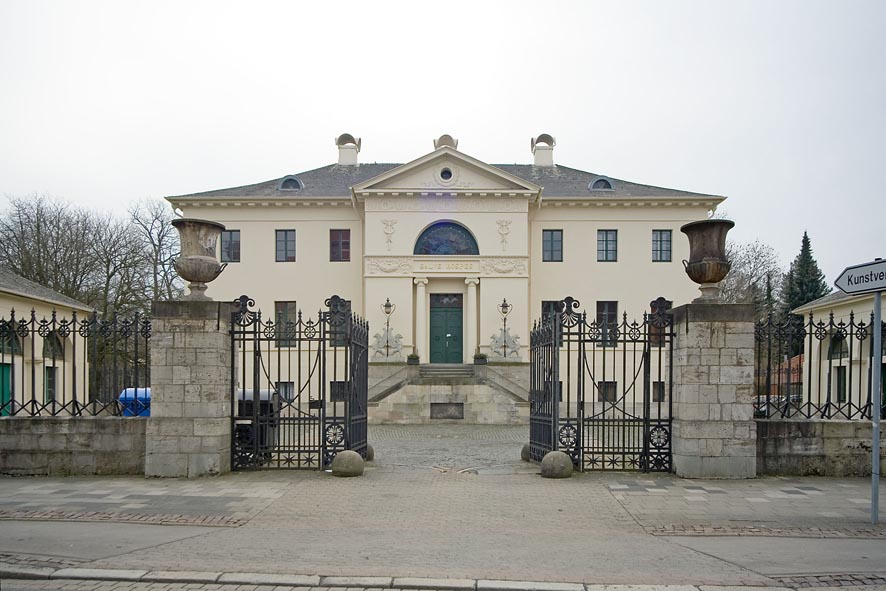
Villa Salve Hospes (built 1805–1808), now headquarters of the Art Society

On a recommendation by Friedrich Vieweg (founder of a publishing company that now specializes in books on science and engineering), Duke Karl Wilhelm Ferdinand of Braunschweig personally negotiated with Krahe to settle there. In 1803, he became the Chief Civil Engineer, succeeding Christian Gottlob Langwagen. Shortly thereafter, he began razing the old fortifications, preserving some of the ramparts near the city center and using parts of the wall for causeways. The hills where the bastions were located became parks. In 1806, the French Army once again displaced him from his position, but he was able to find sporadic employment expanding a Baroque-era castle for the use of King Jérôme. After the area's liberation in 1814, he took over management of the construction industry for the Duchy of Brunswick. In 1830, the Duchy created a Construction Authority, based on Prussian models, and Krahe had to yield to the lawyers who became the new managers. Nevertheless, he continued to work for the Authority until his forced retirement in 1837. He was succeeded by Carl Theodor Ottmer.

== The Peter Joseph Krahe Prize ==
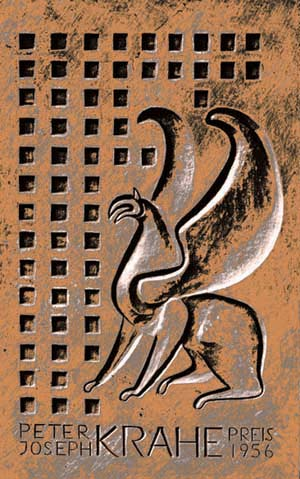
Bronze plaque of the Peter Joseph Krahe Prize

The Peter Joseph Krahe prize is awarded by the city of Braunschweig "in recognition and promotion of architectural work...and to commemorate the architect Peter Joseph Krahe". The award was presented twelve times between 1954 and 2009. It consists of a certificate and a bronze plaque, designed by local artists.
