= Richland High School =

Richland High School may refer to:

== Richland High School ==
- Richland High School (Mississippi), Richland, Mississippi (Jackson metropolitan area)
- Richland High School (Essex, Missouri), Essex, Missouri
- Richland High School (Richland, Missouri), Richland, Missouri
- Richland High School (North Dakota), Colfax, North Dakota
- Richland High School (North Richland Hills, Texas) (Dallas-Fort Worth area)
- Richland High School (Prosper, Texas)
- Richland High School (Washington), Richland, Washington
- Richland High School (Tennessee), Lynnville, Tennessee
- Richland High School (Pennsylvania), Johnstown, Pennsylvania

== Similarly named schools ==
- Richland Collegiate High School, Dallas, Texas
- West Richland High School, Noble, Illinois
- East Richland High School, Olney, Illinois
- Richland County Vocational Technical Center, Wahpeton, North Dakota
- Pine-Richland High School, Gibsonia, Pennsylvania
- Richland Northeast High School, Columbia, South Carolina
- Lower Richland High School, Hopkins, South Carolina
- Richland Center High School, Richland Center, Wisconsin

== See also ==
- Richland (disambiguation)
- Richland Township (disambiguation)
