= Richmond metropolitan area (disambiguation) =

The Richmond metropolitan area is a metropolitan area centered on Richmond, Virginia.

Richmond metropolitan area may also refer to:

- The Richmond, Kentucky micropolitan area, United States
- The Richmond, Indiana micropolitan area, United States

== See also ==
- Richmond (disambiguation)
