= Christian Gottlob Langwagen =

German architect (1752–1805)

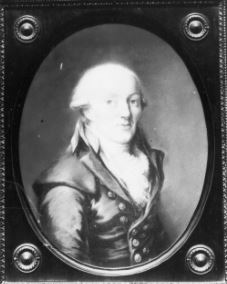
Christian Gottlob Langwagen (artist unknown)

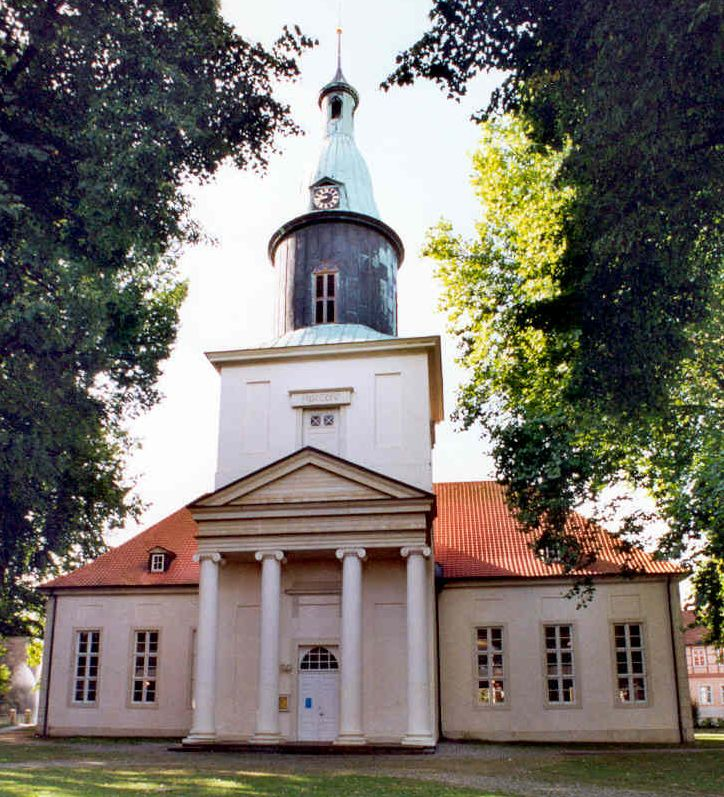
The Michaeliskirche, Fallersleben

Christian Gottlob Langwagen (1752, Dresden – 13 August 1805, Braunschweig) was a German architect who served as a Master Builder for the Duchy of Brunswick-Lüneburg).

== Life and work ==
He was originally a stonecutter, presumably from a poor background. Sometime in the 1770s, he was able to study copper engraving at the Dresden Academy of Fine Arts. There, he developed an interest in architecture and became a student of the Court Architect, Friedrich August Krubsacius.

Duke Charles William Ferdinand called him to the Royal Seat in 1777 and appointed him Court Architect. Later, he went on study trips to Berlin, Hamburg, and throughout rural Germany. He was also the first Chief Civil Engineer in the Duchy; serving until 1803, when he retired and was succeeded by Peter Joseph Krahe.

Most of the buildings he worked on personally have been demolished or destroyed. From 1786 to 1788, he built a palace for Johann Conrad Riedesel zu Eisenbach, which became a hotel in 1884 and was largely destroyed in World War II. In 1789, he designed the new interior of the Michaeliskirche, but most of his work was removed in 1868. The Lange Brücke (Long Bridge, 1788 to 1791), in south Braunschweig, was demolished in 1879 during work on a canal.

Two outbuildings from the 1780s, at Schloss Richmond, have been preserved. At the Landschaftliches Haus, his portico was incorporated into the new District Court. Outside of Braunschweig, he created several schools, townhouses and industrial buildings, which have largely not survived. Most of the Michaeliskirche in Fallersleben is original.
