= Richmond Hill station =

Richmond Hill station may refer to:

- Richmond Hill GO Station, a station in Richmond Hill, Ontario, Canada
- Richmond Hill station (LIRR), a station in the Richmond Hill neighborhood of Queens, New York, U.S.
