= Richmond College =

Richmond College may refer to:

== United States ==
- Richmond College (New York City), part of the College of Staten Island of City University of New York
- Richmond College (Virginia), part of the University of Richmond

== United Kingdom ==
- Richmond Theological College, a former college in Richmond, London
- Richmond, The American International University in London
- Richmond Adult Community College, now Richmond and Hillcroft Adult Community College, in Richmond, London
- Richmond upon Thames College, a college in Twickenham, London

== Sri Lanka ==
- Richmond College, Galle, a primary and secondary school
