= Richmond Creek =

Richmond Creek may refer to:

- Richmond Creek (Fresh Kills), a tributary of the Fresh Kills in New York
- Richmond Creek (Suffolk County, New York), in Suffolk County, New York
