= Richmond Bridge =

Richmond Bridge may refer to:

- Richmond Bridge (Tasmania), a bridge in Tasmania, Australia
- Richmond Bridge, London, a bridge in London, England
  - Richmond Railway Bridge
- Richmond–San Rafael Bridge, a bridge in California, United States
- Green Bridge (England), in Richmond, North Yorkshire, sometimes referred to as Richmond Bridge
