= Richmond Oval =

Richmond Oval may refer to:

- Richmond Olympic Oval, in Richmond, British Columbia, Canada
- Richmond Oval (South Australia), in Richmond, Adelaide, Australia
- Punt Road Oval in East Melbourne, Victoria, Australia
