= Ridgeland =

Ridgeland may refer to:

- Ridgeland, Mississippi
- Ridgeland, Wisconsin
- Ridgeland, South Carolina
- Ridgelands, Queensland, Australia
