= Richlands, West Virginia =

- Unincorporated community
- Location within the state of West Virginia Richlands (the United States)
- Coordinates: 37°51′58″N 80°28′59″W
- Country: United States
- State: West Virginia
- County: Greenbrier
- Time zone: UTC-5 (Eastern (EST))
  - Summer (DST): UTC-4 (EDT)

Richlands is a small unincorporated farming community in Greenbrier County, West Virginia, United States, five miles (8 km) west of Lewisburg on U.S. Route 60.

The community was so named on account of their fertile soil.

Once served by Central School, a two-room schoolhouse housing grades K–9, local children now attend school in Lewisburg. The area has a Ruritan club, The Richland Ruritans, and a 4-H club, The Central Willing Workers.
