= Schloss Richmond =

Coordinates: 52°14′24″N 10°31′36″E

Richmond Castle
- Schloss Richmond
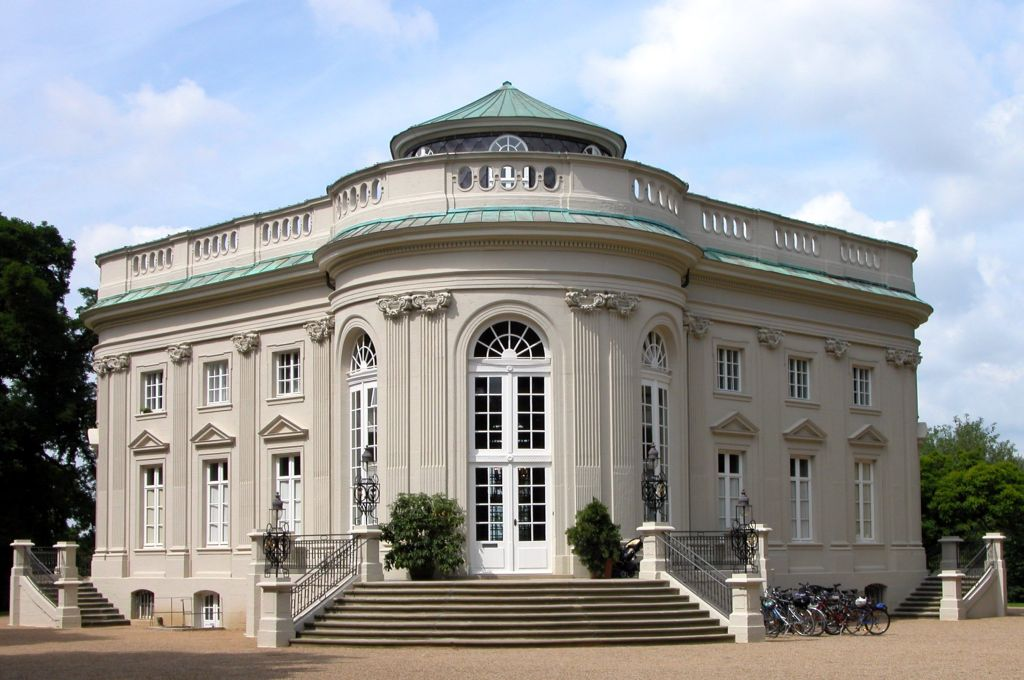
- Richmond Castle

- Location within Lower Saxony Location within Germany

General information
- Architectural style: Baroque
- Location: Braunschweig, Germany
- Construction started: 1768
- Completed: 1769

Design and construction
- Architect: Carl Christoph Wilhelm Fleischer
- Other designers: Christian Gottlob Langwagen, architect, Lancelot "Capability" Brown, landscape architect

Richmond Castle (German: 'Schloss Richmond') is a castle built from 1768 to 1769 in Braunschweig, Germany for Princess (later Duchess) Augusta, wife of Karl Wilhelm Ferdinand. It lies near the Oker river in the south of the city. The architect was Carl Christoph Wilhelm Fleischer.

The castle was named after the princess's English home in Richmond Park, a royal park now in the London Borough of Richmond upon Thames.

== Architecture ==
The castle grounds are located along Wolfenbütteler Straße ("Wolfenbüttel Street") in the city district of Heidberg-Melverode. The building is built in Baroque style, and has a square floor plan with the entrance at one corner. The state rooms are located on the diagonal, and on either side of these, there are private rooms and a mezzanine floor. The facade is divided into pedestal, pilaster, and entablature areas, with a balustrade parapet. Projecting avant-corps and perrons (staircases) emphasize the respective ends of the corps de logis.

Compared to the original plan, the designs of the balustrade, staircases, and roof were changed over the course of time. For example, in 1785 the architect Christian Gottlob Langwagen improved the lighting in the central part of the building by installing a roof lantern with 12 windows.

In 1935, the city of Braunschweig acquired the castle grounds from Duke Ernst August. Since 1945, the building has been used for public events. The 18th-century paintings in the interior of the building were restored from 1977 to 1981.

== Park ==
The park was created along with the castle in 1768, in the style of a classic English landscape garden. Together with the Wörlitzer Park, it is one of the earliest landscape gardens in northern Germany.

The park was designed by the renowned English landscape architect Lancelot "Capability" Brown and is similar in structure and details to Richmond Park, a royal park in the London Borough of Richmond upon Thames. A special feature of the park are the long lines of sight that extend far into the country from the castle. Brown's intention was possibly to create a peaceful, picturesque, ideal representation of a landscape painting.

Over the years, the original design was modified and adapted to the tastes of the respective era. From 1830, Duke Wilhelm employed the court gardener Johann Christian Burmester to expand the park significantly. Between 1833 and 1838, more buildings were added – the Ducal Villa and Schloss Neu-Richmond or Williams Castle (which no longer exists). In addition, larger water areas and an island were created.

The park has been open to the public since 1964. The nearly four-acre park, largely neglected after the end of World War II in Europe, was reconstructed in 1987 after the historic original design.

== Miscellaneous ==
The castle is not open every day and can only be visited with a guide. Only the state rooms on the ground floor (the three on the diagonal and two smaller rooms facing the gardens on either side of the diagonal) are accessible to the public, because the first floor is a private residence.

In 1871, a Braunschweig brewery was named after the castle's popular name, Feldschlößchen. A travelling brewer from Braunschweig took the name to Switzerland and founded the Feldschlösschen brewery in Rheinfelden in 1876.

Since 1982, the Gerstäcker Museum has been housed in the former guard and kitchen house.

== Gallery ==
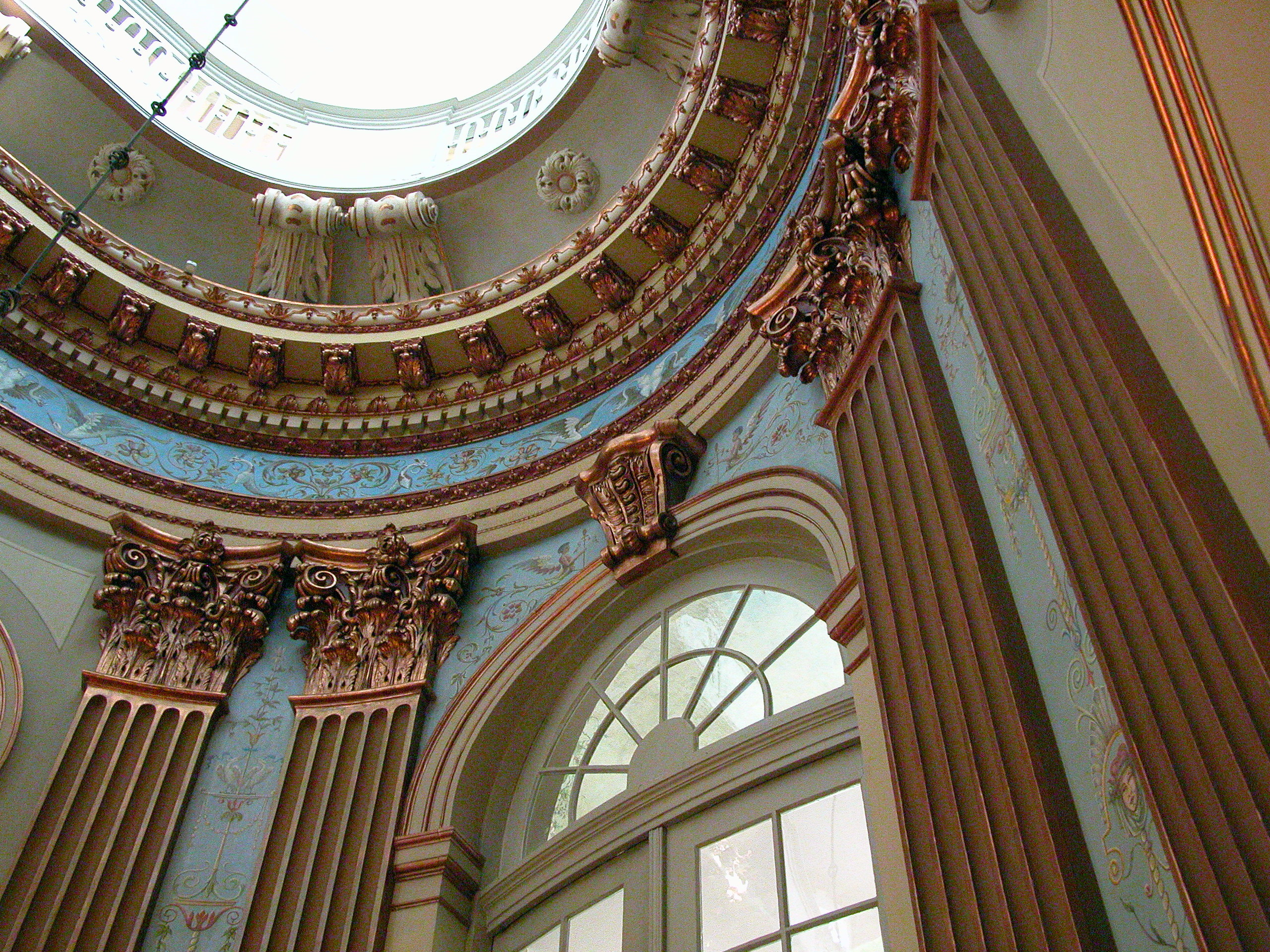
Wall and ceiling decorations

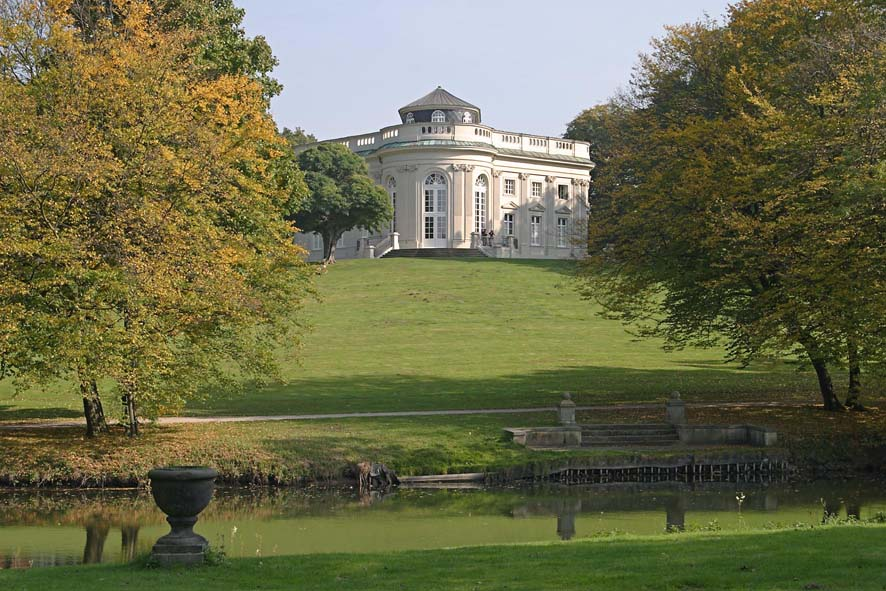
View from the garden side of the Oker river

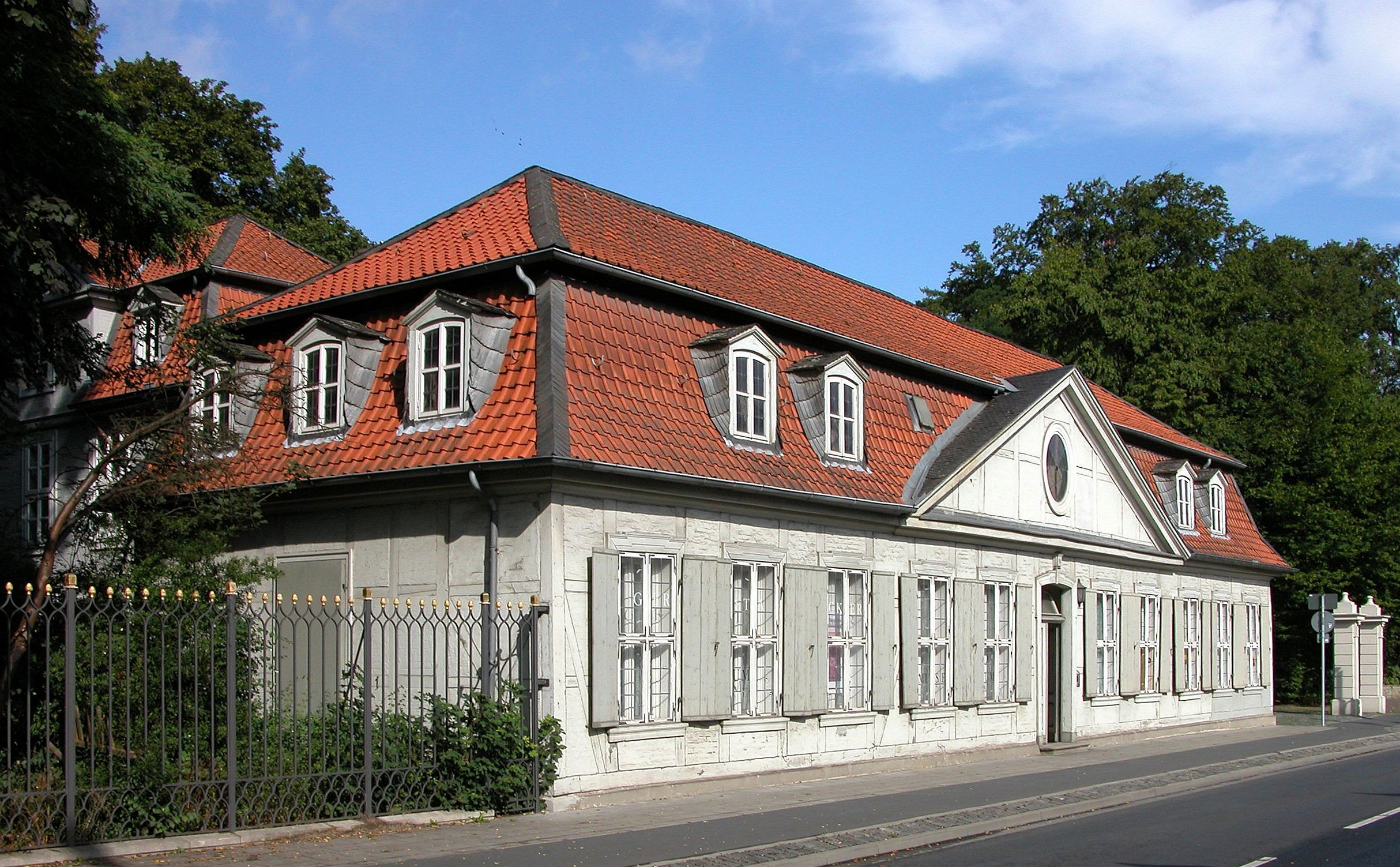
Gerstäcker Museum

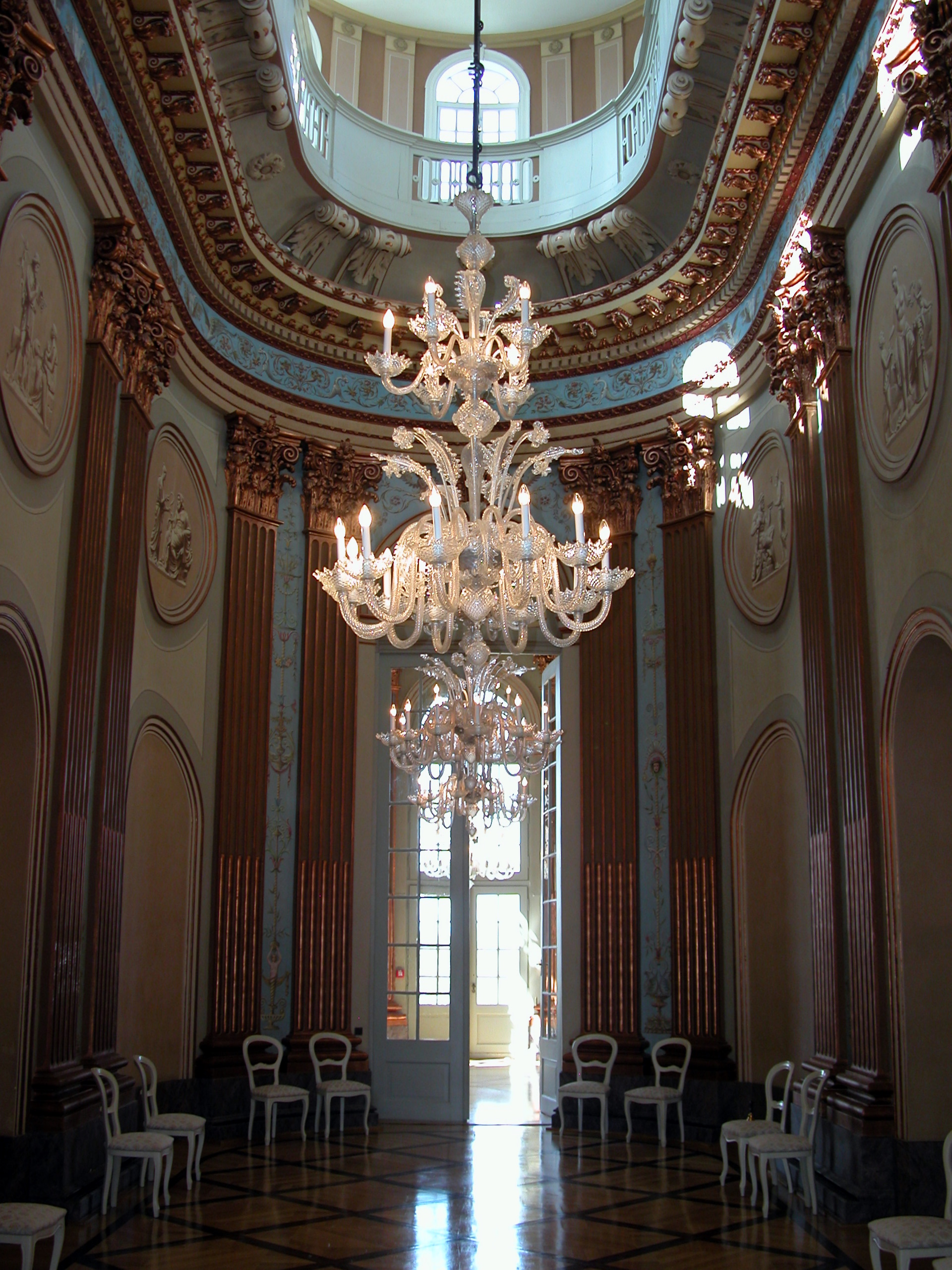
Central area

== Sources ==
- Bessin, Peter (2001). "Der Regent als Architekt. Schloß Richmond und die Lustschloßbauten Braunschweig-Wolfenbüttels zwischen 1680 und 1780 als Paradigma fürstlicher Selbstdarstellung." [The Regent as an architect: Castle Richmond and Brunswick-Wolfenbüttel pleasure palaces as a paradigm of princely self-portrayal]. Rekonstruktion der Künste (in German). Vol. 5. Göttingen: Vandenhoeck und Ruprecht. ISBN 3-525-47904-2.
- "Schloss Richmond" [Richmond Castle]. Work Reports from the Municipal Museum in Braunschweig (in German). 45. Municipal Museum Braunschweig. 1984.
- Raben, Gustav-Adolf (1987). "Richmond Braunschweig. Schloss- und Parkanlage, ihre Herleitung aus England" [Richmond Brunswick: Castle and park, their derivation from England]. Dissertation, University of Hamburg (in German).
- Tute, Heinz-Joachim; Ulferts, Gert-Dieter, eds. (1993). Richmond. Bilder aus 225 Jahren Geschichte [Richmond: Images from 225 years of history] (in German). Braunschweig: Meyer. ISBN 3-926701-18-8.
- Tute, Heinz-Joachim; Köhler, Marcus; Schuegraf, Wolf-Dieter, eds. (1989). "Gartenkunst in Braunschweig. Von den fürstlichen Gärten des Barock zum Bürgerpark der Gründerzeit." [Garden Art in Braunschweig: From the princely gardens of the Baroque to the Gründerzeit citizens' park]. Braunschweiger Werkstücke. 76 / Reihe A. Veröffentlichungen aus dem Stadtarchiv und der Stadtbibliothek. [Braunschweig workpieces. 76 / A. Publications from the city archives and city library.] (in German). Vol. 26. Braunschweig: City Library. ISBN 3-87884-037-3.
