= Richfield High School =

Richfield is a name for several high schools in North America, including:

- Richfield High School (Idaho), Richfield, Idaho
- Richfield High School (Minnesota), Richfield, Minnesota
- Richfield High School (Ohio), Richfield, Ohio
- Richfield High School (Utah), Richfield, Utah
- Richfield High School (Waco), formerly located in Waco, Texas
