= New Richmond =

New Richmond may refer to the following places:

In Canada:

- New Richmond, Quebec

In the United States:

- New Richmond, Indiana
- New Richmond, Michigan
- New Richmond, Ohio
- New Richmond, West Virginia
- New Richmond, Wisconsin
