= Richland School District =

Richland School District may refer to:

- Richland School District (Cambria County, Pennsylvania), Pennsylvania, United States
- Richland School District (Washington), Washington, United States
- Richland School District (Wisconsin), Wisconsin, United States
- Richland County School District One, South Carolina, United States
- Richland County School District Two, South Carolina, United States
- Lexington & Richland County School District Five, South Carolina, United States
- Richland School District 88A, Illinois, United States
