= Richmond Hill =

Richmond Hill may refer to:

== Places ==
=== Australia ===
- Richmond Hill, Queensland, a suburb of Charters Towers

=== Canada ===
- Richmond Hill, Ontario
  - Richmond Hill GO Station, a station in the GO Transit network located in the town
  - Richmond Hill (federal electoral district)
  - Richmond Hill (provincial electoral district)

=== Grenada ===
- Richmond Hill Prison, a historical prison

=== New Zealand ===
- Richmond Hill, Christchurch, Canterbury, a suburb of Christchurch on the Banks Peninsula

=== Sri Lanka ===
- Richmond Hill, Galle

=== United Kingdom ===
- Richmond Hill, London
- Richmond Hill, Leeds, West Yorkshire
- Richmond Hill, Bournemouth, Dorset

=== United States ===
- Richmond Hill, Georgia
  - Richmond Hill Road, a major street in Augusta, Georgia
- Richmond Hill explosion, in Indianapolis
- Richmond Hill, Queens, New York City
- Richmond Hill (Manhattan), a colonial estate that served for a time as the headquarters of George Washington
- Richmond Hill (Livingston, New York), listed on the National Register of Historic Places
- Richmond Hill, North Carolina
- Richmond Hill, Virginia

== Other ==
- SS Richmond Hill, a cargo ship built in 1940 for Counties Ship Management Co. Ltd.
- Richmond Hill (television series), a 1988 Australian television soap opera
- Richmond Hill, a 2024 album by Masta Ace and Marco Polo
- Richmond Hill line, a GO Transit railway line in the Greater Toronto Area
