= Richmond Park (disambiguation) =

Richmond Park is a Royal Park in London.

Richmond Park may also refer to:

== Australia ==
- Richmond Park, a park in Richmond, New South Wales
- Richmond Park, racehorse stud of James Henry Aldridge in South Australia
- Richmond Park, a park in Richmond, Victoria
  - Richmond Park railway station
- Richmond Paddock, now known as Yarra Park, a park in East Melbourne, Victoria

== United Kingdom ==
- Richmond Park (UK Parliament constituency), London
- Richmond Park, Bournemouth, a suburb of Bournemouth
- Richmond Park (Carmarthen), a football stadium in Wales
- A public park in Oatlands, Glasgow, Scotland
- A public park in Sheffield, England
- A road junction in Eastfield, South Lanarkshire, Scotland

== Elsewhere ==
- Richmond Park (football ground), Ireland
- Richmond Park, Jamaica, a neighbourhood of Kingston, Jamaica
