= Richland Township, LaSalle County, Illinois =

Coordinates: 41°08′41″N 89°01′07″W

Richland Township
- Township
- Location in LaSalle County

- LaSalle County's location in Illinois
- Country: United States
- State: Illinois
- County: LaSalle
- Established: Unknown

Area
  - Total: 24.27 sq mi (62.9 km^{2})
  - Land: 24.27 sq mi (62.9 km^{2})
  - Water: 0 sq mi (0 km^{2}) 0%

Population (2020)
  - Total: 362
  - Density: 14.9/sq mi (5.76/km^{2})
- Time zone: UTC-6 (CST)
  - Summer (DST): UTC-5 (CDT)
- FIPS code: 17-099-63576

Richland Township is located in LaSalle County, Illinois. As of the 2020 census, its population was 362 and it contained 159 housing units. Richland Township was formed from Bruce Township on an unknown date.

== Geography ==
According to the 2021 census gazetteer files, Richland Township has a total area of 24.27 square miles (62.86 km^{2}), all land.

== Demographics ==
As of the 2020 census there were 362 people, 135 households, and 77 families residing in the township. The population density was 14.91 inhabitants per square mile (5.76/km^{2}). There were 159 housing units at an average density of 6.55 per square mile (2.53/km^{2}). The racial makeup of the township was 94.20% White, 0.00% African American, 0.00% Native American, 0.55% Asian, 0.00% Pacific Islander, 1.10% from other races, and 4.14% from two or more races. Hispanic or Latino of any race were 3.59% of the population.

There were 135 households, out of which 24.40% had children under the age of 18 living with them, 50.37% were married couples living together, 1.48% had a female householder with no spouse present, and 42.96% were non-families. 36.30% of all households were made up of individuals, and 24.40% had someone living alone who was 65 years of age or older. The average household size was 2.33 and the average family size was 3.13.

The township's age distribution consisted of 21.9% under the age of 18, 8.6% from 18 to 24, 23.2% from 25 to 44, 28.9% from 45 to 64, and 17.5% who were 65 years of age or older. The median age was 40.0 years. For every 100 females, there were 111.4 males. For every 100 females age 18 and over, there were 108.5 males.

The median income for a household in the township was $76,797, and the median income for a family was $94,250. Males had a median income of $71,667 versus $25,833 for females. The per capita income for the township was $33,064. No families and 8.0% of the population were below the poverty line, including none of those under age 18 and 29.1% of those age 65 or over.

Historical population
Census	Pop.	Note	%±
2010	379		—
2020	362		−4.5%
2016 (est.)	367		−3.2%
U.S. Decennial Census
