= Richfield Township =

Richfield Township may refer to:

- Richfield Township, Adams County, Illinois
- Richfield Township, Morton County, Kansas, in Morton County, Kansas
- Richfield Township, Genesee County, Michigan
- Richfield Township, Roscommon County, Michigan
- Richfield Township, Henry County, Ohio
- Richfield Township, Lucas County, Ohio
- Richfield Township, Summit County, Ohio
- Richfield Township, Spink County, South Dakota, in Spink County, South Dakota
