= Richmond Township =

Richmond Township may refer to:

== Canada ==
- Richmond Township, in Greater Napanee, Ontario

== United States ==
=== Illinois ===
- Richmond Township, McHenry County, Illinois

=== Kansas ===
- Richmond Township, Franklin County, Kansas
- Richmond Township, Nemaha County, Kansas, in Nemaha County, Kansas

=== Michigan ===
- Richmond Township, Macomb County, Michigan
- Richmond Township, Marquette County, Michigan
- Richmond Township, Osceola County, Michigan

=== Minnesota ===
- Richmond Township, Winona County, Minnesota

=== Missouri ===
- Richmond Township, Howard County, Missouri
- Richmond Township, Ray County, Missouri

=== North Dakota ===
- Richmond Township, Burleigh County, North Dakota, in Burleigh County, North Dakota

=== Ohio ===
- Richmond Township, Ashtabula County, Ohio
- Richmond Township, Huron County, Ohio

=== Pennsylvania ===
- Richmond Township, Berks County, Pennsylvania
- Richmond Township, Crawford County, Pennsylvania
- Richmond Township, Tioga County, Pennsylvania
