= USS Richmond =

Three ships in the United States Navy have been named USS Richmond for the capital of Virginia.

- USS Richmond (1798) was a brig, launched and purchased for the Navy in 1798. She was sold in 1801.
- USS Richmond (1860) was wooden steam sloop-of-war, launched in 1860. She served in the American Civil War and later as a receiving ship. She was finally stricken from the Naval Vessel Register in 1919.
- USS Richmond (CL-9) was launched in 1921, saw service in World War II and decommissioned in 1945.

See also

- USS Richmond K. Turner (CG-20)
- CSS Richmond, a Confederate ram.
