= Richland Township =

Richland Township may refer to:

== Arkansas ==
- Richland Township, Desha County, Arkansas, in Desha County, Arkansas
- Richland Township, Jefferson County, Arkansas
- Richland Township, Lee County, Arkansas, in Lee County, Arkansas
- Richland Township, Little River County, Arkansas, in Little River County, Arkansas
- Richland Township, Madison County, Arkansas
- Richland Township, Monroe County, Arkansas, in Monroe County, Arkansas
- Richland Township, Newton County, Arkansas, in Newton County, Arkansas
- Richland Township, Washington County, Arkansas, in Washington County, Arkansas
- Richland Township, Yell County, Arkansas, in Yell County, Arkansas

== Illinois ==
- Richland Township, DeKalb County, Illinois, now Cortland Township
- Richland Township, LaSalle County, Illinois
- Richland Township, Marshall County, Illinois
- Richland Township, Shelby County, Illinois

== Indiana ==
- Richland Township, Benton County, Indiana
- Richland Township, DeKalb County, Indiana
- Richland Township, Fountain County, Indiana
- Richland Township, Fulton County, Indiana
- Richland Township, Grant County, Indiana
- Richland Township, Greene County, Indiana
- Richland Township, Jay County, Indiana
- Richland Township, Madison County, Indiana
- Richland Township, Miami County, Indiana
- Richland Township, Monroe County, Indiana
- Richland Township, Rush County, Indiana
- Richland Township, Steuben County, Indiana
- Richland Township, Whitley County, Indiana

== Iowa ==
- Richland Township, Adair County, Iowa
- Richland Township, Carroll County, Iowa
- Richland Township, Chickasaw County, Iowa
- Richland Township, Decatur County, Iowa
- Richland Township, Delaware County, Iowa
- Richland Township, Dickinson County, Iowa
- Richland Township, Franklin County, Iowa
- Richland Township, Guthrie County, Iowa
- Richland Township, Jackson County, Iowa
- Richland Township, Jasper County, Iowa
- Richland Township, Jones County, Iowa
- Richland Township, Keokuk County, Iowa
- Richland Township, Lyon County, Iowa
- Richland Township, Mahaska County, Iowa
- Richland Township, Sac County, Iowa
- Richland Township, Story County, Iowa
- Richland Township, Tama County, Iowa
- Richland Township, Wapello County, Iowa
- Richland Township, Warren County, Iowa, in Warren County, Iowa

== Kansas ==
- Richland Township, Butler County, Kansas
- Richland Township, Cowley County, Kansas
- Richland Township, Ford County, Kansas
- Richland Township, Hamilton County, Kansas
- Richland Township, Harvey County, Kansas
- Richland Township, Jewell County, Kansas
- Richland Township, Kingman County, Kansas
- Richland Township, Labette County, Kansas, in Labette County, Kansas
- Richland Township, Marshall County, Kansas, in Marshall County, Kansas
- Richland Township, Miami County, Kansas, in Miami County, Kansas
- Richland Township, Ottawa County, Kansas, in Ottawa County, Kansas
- Richland Township, Republic County, Kansas
- Richland Township, Stafford County, Kansas, in Stafford County, Kansas

== Michigan ==
- Richland Township, Kalamazoo County, Michigan
- Richland Township, Missaukee County, Michigan
- Richland Township, Montcalm County, Michigan
- Richland Township, Ogemaw County, Michigan
- Richland Township, Saginaw County, Michigan

== Minnesota ==
- Richland Township, Rice County, Minnesota

== Missouri ==
- Richland Township, Barton County, Missouri
- Richland Township, Douglas County, Missouri, in Douglas County, Missouri
- Richland Township, Gasconade County, Missouri
- Richland Township, Macon County, Missouri, in Macon County, Missouri
- Richland Township, Morgan County, Missouri
- Richland Township, Ozark County, Missouri
- Richland Township, Putnam County, Missouri
- Richland Township, Scott County, Missouri
- Richland Township, Stoddard County, Missouri
- Richland Township, Vernon County, Missouri

== Nebraska ==
- Richland Township, Saunders County, Nebraska

== North Carolina ==
- Richland Township, Beaufort County, North Carolina, in Beaufort County, North Carolina
- Richland Township, Randolph County, North Carolina, in Randolph County, North Carolina

== North Dakota ==
- Richland Township, Burke County, North Dakota, in Burke County, North Dakota

== Ohio ==
- Richland Township, Allen County, Ohio
- Richland Township, Belmont County, Ohio
- Richland Township, Clinton County, Ohio
- Richland Township, Darke County, Ohio
- Richland Township, Defiance County, Ohio
- Richland Township, Fairfield County, Ohio
- Richland Township, Guernsey County, Ohio
- Richland Township, Holmes County, Ohio
- Richland Township, Logan County, Ohio
- Richland Township, Marion County, Ohio
- Richland Township, Vinton County, Ohio
- Richland Township, Wyandot County, Ohio

== Pennsylvania ==
- Richland Township, Allegheny County, Pennsylvania
- Richland Township, Bucks County, Pennsylvania
- Richland Township, Cambria County, Pennsylvania
- Richland Township, Clarion County, Pennsylvania
- Richland Township, Venango County, Pennsylvania

== South Dakota ==
- Richland Township, Beadle County, South Dakota, in Beadle County, South Dakota
