= Live PD season 4 =

Live PD
- Season 4
- Hosted by: Dan Abrams; Tom Morris Jr.; Sean "Sticks" Larkin
- Companion shows: Live PD: Rewind; Live PD: Roll Call
- No. of episodes: 65

Release
- Original network: A&E
- Original release: September 20, 2019 – May 23, 2020

Season chronology
- ← Previous; Season 3

The fourth and final season of the television series Live PD began airing September 20, 2019, on A&E in the United States. The season concluded with the cancellation of the series, on May 23, 2020 and contained 65 episodes.

== Departments ==
=== Departments returning from season three ===
- Richland County (SC) Sheriff's Department
- Salinas (CA) Police Department
- Lawrence (IN) Police Department
- East Providence (RI) Police Department
- Lafayette (LA) Police Department
- Nye County (NV) Sheriff's Office
- Mission (TX) Police Department
- Williamson County (TX) Sheriff’s Office

=== Department returning from season one ===
- Tulsa (OK) Police Department

=== Departments debuting in season four ===
- Tallahassee (FL) Police Department
- Missoula County (MT) Sheriff's Office
- Jefferson County (AL) Sheriff's Office
- Terre Haute (IN) Police Department
- Bradford County (FL) Sheriff's Office
- Berkeley County Sheriff's Office
- Pomona (CA) Police Department
- Volusia County (FL) Sheriffs Office
- Clay County (FL) Sheriff’s Office
- West Baton Rouge (LA) Sheriffs Office

== Episodes ==
Season four premiered on September 20, 2019.

No. overall	No. in season	Title	Original release date	U.S. viewers (millions)
234	1	"09.20.19"	September 20, 2019	2.023
Guest analysts: Sgt. Sean "Sticks" Larkin of the Tulsa (OK) Police Department Gang Unit and Matt Iseman, new host of spin-off series Live Rescue.; Departments and officers featured include: Richland County (SC) Sheriff's Department (Lt. Danny Brown & S/D Daniel Mulcahy), Salinas (CA) Police Department (Ofc. Michael Mike Muscutt & Ofc. Evan Adams), Lawrence (IN) Police Department (Ofc. Stuart Bishop & Ofc. John Clark with K9 Sorbon), East Providence (RI) Police Department (Ofc. Kyle Graves & Ofc. Jay Rainville with K9 Chiko), Lafayette (LA) Police Department (Ofc. Brandon Dugas & Ofc. Rob Green), Missoula County (MT) Sheriff's Office (Capt. Bill Burt & Det. Mike Sunderland), Tallahassee (FL) Police Department (Ofc. Tri Dinh & Ofc. Justin Hill), and Tulsa (OK) Police Department (Ofc. Erin Bitting & Ofc. Darrell Ross).
235	2	"09.21.19"	September 21, 2019	1.662
Guest analysts: Sgt. Sean "Sticks" Larkin of the Tulsa (OK) Police Department Gang Unit and Matt Iseman, new host of spin-off series Live Rescue.; Departments and officers featured include: Richland County (SC) Sheriff's Department (S/D Garo Brown & Dep. Brandon Simmons), Salinas (CA) Police Department (Ofc. Mike Muscutt & Ofc. Daniel Martinez), Lawrence (IN) Police Department (Ofc. Jason Heiney & Ofc. John Clark with K9 Sorbon), East Providence (RI) Police Department (Insp. Craig Sroka & Ofc. Jacob Mount), Lafayette (LA) Police Department (Ofc. Brandon Dugas & Ofc. Rob Green), Missoula County (MT) Sheriff's Office (Capt. Bill Burt & Det. Mike Sunderland), Tallahassee (FL) Police Department (Ofc. Tri Dinh & Ofc. Justin Hill), and Tulsa (OK) Police Department (Ofc. Erin Bitting & Ofc. Darrell Ross).
236	3	"09.27.19"	September 27, 2019	1.790
Guest analyst: Sgt. Sean "Sticks" Larkin of the Tulsa (OK) Police Department Gang Unit.; Departments and officers featured include: Lawrence (IN) Police Department (Ofc. Jason Heiney & Ofc. Derek Byerly), Lafayette (LA) Police Department (Cpl. Ricky Fontenot & Ofc. Marvin Martin, Jr.), Richland County (SC) Sheriff's Department (Cpl. Kristy Boyles & Dep. Kenneth Fitzsimmons), Missoula County (MT) Sheriff's Office (Capt. Bill Burt & Det. Mike Sunderland), Tulsa (OK) Police Department (Ofc. Erin Bitting & Ofc. Darrell Ross), Tallahassee (FL) Police Department (Ofc. Phil Hinds & Ofc. Justin Hill), East Providence (RI) Police Department (Ofc. Andrew DuBois & Ofc. Jay Rainville with K9 Chiko), and Salinas (CA) Police Department (Ofc. Evan Adams & Ofc. Nicholas Abruzzini).
237	4	"09.28.19"	September 28, 2019	1.863
Guest analyst: Sgt. Sean "Sticks" Larkin of the Tulsa (OK) Police Department Gang Unit.; Departments and officers featured include: Richland County (SC) Sheriff's Department (Lt. Danny Brown & Cpl. Gavin Walmsley with K9 Emy), Salinas (CA) Police Department (Ofc. Evan Adams & Ofc. Cameron Mitchell), Lawrence (IN) Police Department (Ofc. Jason Heiney & Lt. Thomas Wright), East Providence (RI) Police Department (Insp. Craig Sroka & Ofc. Ryan Cute), Lafayette (LA) Police Department (Cpl. Ricky Fontenot & Ofc. Marvin Martin, Jr.), Missoula County (MT) Sheriff's Office (Capt. Bill Burt & Det. Mike Sunderland), Tallahassee (FL) Police Department (Ofc. Phil Hinds & Ofc. Justin Hill), and Tulsa (OK) Police Department (Ofc. Erin Bitting & Ofc. Darrell Ross).
238	5	"10.04.19"	October 4, 2019	1.698
Guest analyst: Sgt. Sean "Sticks" Larkin of the Tulsa (OK) Police Department Gang Unit.; Departments and officers featured include: Richland County (SC) Sheriff's Department (Cpl. Mark Laureano & Dep. Addy Perez), Salinas (CA) Police Department (Ofc. Evan Adams & Ofc. Mike Muscutt), Lawrence (IN) Police Department (Ofc. Stuart Bishop & Ofc. Matt Weber), East Providence (RI) Police Department (Ofc. Jacob Mount & Ofc. Ryan Cute), Lafayette (LA) Police Department (Ofc. Zakarie Narcisse & Ofc. Joshua Myers), Missoula County (MT) Sheriff's Office (Capt. Bill Burt & Dep. Forrest Merrill), Tallahassee (FL) Police Department (Ofc. Tri Dinh & Ofc. Justin Hill), and Tulsa (OK) Police Department (Ofc. Erin Bitting & Ofc. Darrell Ross).
239	6	"10.05.19"	October 5, 2019	1.754
Guest analyst: Sgt. Sean "Sticks" Larkin of the Tulsa (OK) Police Department Gang Unit.; Departments and officers featured include: Richland County (SC) Sheriff's Department (Cpl. Mark Laureano & Cpl. Robert Furgal), Salinas (CA) Police Department (Ofc. Cameron Mitchell & Ofc. Mike Muscutt), Lawrence (IN) Police Department (Lt. Thomas Wright & Ofc. Matt Hickey with K9 Axel), East Providence (RI) Police Department (Insp. Craig Sroka & Ofc. Jay Rainville with K9 Chiko), Lafayette (LA) Police Department (Ofc. Brandon Dugas & Ofc. Joshua Myers), Missoula County (MT) Sheriff's Office (Det. Mike Sunderland & Sgt. Ryan Prather), Tallahassee (FL) Police Department (Ofc. Jamey Martinez & Ofc. Justin Hill), and Tulsa (OK) Police Department (Ofc. Erin Bitting & Ofc. Darrell Ross).
240	7	"10.11.19"	October 11, 2019	1.693
Guest analyst: Cpl. Mark Laureano of the Richland County (SC) Sheriff's Department.; Departments and officers featured include: Richland County (SC) Sheriff's Department (Dep. Daniel Mulcahy & Dep. Addy Perez), Salinas (CA) Police Department (Ofc. Daniel Martinez & Ofc. Mike Muscutt), Lawrence (IN) Police Department (Ofc. John Clark with K9 Sorbon & Capt. Tracey Cantrell), East Providence (RI) Police Department (Ofc. Kyle Graves & Ofc. Jay Rainville with K9 Chiko), Lafayette (LA) Police Department (Sgt. Brock Richard & Cpl. Tommy Aphalyarath), Missoula County (MT) Sheriff's Office (Det. Mike Sunderland & Sgt. Josh Volinkaty), Tallahassee (FL) Police Department (Ofc. Brian Smith with K9 Evo & Ofc. Justin Hill), and Tulsa (OK) Police Department (Ofc. Grace Hobbs & Ofc. Darrell Ross).
241	8	"10.12.19"	October 12, 2019	1.670
Guest analyst: Cpl. Mark Laureano of the Richland County (SC) Sheriff's Department.; Departments and officers featured include: Richland County (SC) Sheriff's Department (Dep. Donnyray Campbell & Cpl. Kristy Boyles), Salinas (CA) Police Department (Ofc. Cameron Mitchell & Ofc. Evan Adams), Lawrence (IN) Police Department (Ofc. John Clark with K9 Sorbon & Ofc. Derek Byerly), East Providence (RI) Police Department (Ofc. Jacob Mount & Insp. Craig Sroka), Lafayette (LA) Police Department (Sgt. Brock Richard & Cpl. Tommy Aphalyarath), Missoula County (MT) Sheriff's Office (Capt. Bill Burt & Sgt. Josh Volinkaty), Tallahassee (FL) Police Department (Ofc. Brian Smith with K9 Evo & Ofc. Justin Hill), and Tulsa (OK) Police Department (Ofc. Erin Bitting & Ofc. Darrell Ross).
242	9	"10.17.19"	October 17, 2019	1.216
Guest analyst: Lt. Grayson Kennedy of the Williamson County (TX) Sheriff's Office.; Departments and officers featured include: Richland County (SC) Sheriff's Department (Dep. Donnyray Campbell & S/D Garo Brown), Salinas (CA) Police Department (Ofc. Mike Muscutt & Ofc. Robert Durst), Lawrence (IN) Police Department (Ofc. Stuart Bishop & Tracey Cantrell), East Providence (RI) Police Department (Ofc. Kyle Graves & Ofc. Jay Rainville with K9 Chiko), Lafayette (LA) Police Department (Cpl. Ricky Fontenot & Cpl. Tommy Aphalyarath), Missoula County (MT) Sheriff's Office (Cpl. Loren Hochhalter & Cpl. Troy Rexin), Tallahassee (FL) Police Department (Ofc. Brian Smith with K9 Evo & Ofc. Brian Githens with K9 Diesel), and Tulsa (OK) Police Department (Ofc. Heath Brownell & Ofc. Grace Hobbs).
243	10	"10.18.19"	October 18, 2019	1.566
Guest analyst: Sgt. Sean "Sticks" Larkin of the Tulsa (OK) Police Department Gang Unit.; Departments and officers featured include: Richland County (SC) Sheriff's Department (Lt. Danny Brown & M/D Jacob Murphy), Salinas (CA) Police Department (Ofc. Mike Muscutt & Ofc. Daniel Martinez), Lawrence (IN) Police Department (Ofc. Jason Heiney & Ofc. John Clark with K9 Sorbon), East Providence (RI) Police Department (Ofc. Jacob Mount & Ofc. Andrew DuBois), Lafayette (LA) Police Department (Ofc. Joshua Myers & Ofc. Jordan Colla), Missoula County (MT) Sheriff's Office (Capt. Bill Burt & Cpl. Troy Rexin), Tallahassee (FL) Police Department (Ofc. Brian Smith with K9 Evo & Ofc. Justin Hill), and Tulsa (OK) Police Department (Ofc. Mitchell Helberg & Ofc. Grace Hobbs).
244	11	"10.19.19"	October 19, 2019	1.585
Guest analyst: Sgt. Sean "Sticks" Larkin of the Tulsa (OK) Police Department Gang Unit.; Departments and officers featured include: Richland County (SC) Sheriff's Department (S/D Garo Brown & S/D Daniel Mulcahy), Salinas (CA) Police Department (Ofc. Mike Muscutt & Ofc. Evan Adams), Lawrence (IN) Police Department (Ofc. Jason Heiney & Ofc. Adam Hazelwood with K9 Chedo), East Providence (RI) Police Department (Insp. Craig Sroka & Ofc. Jay Rainville with K9 Chiko), Lafayette (LA) Police Department (Ofc. Joshua Myers & Cpl. Michael Milazzo), Missoula County (MT) Sheriff's Office (Capt. Bill Burt & Sgt. Ryan Prather), Tallahassee (FL) Police Department (Ofc. Brian Smith with K9 Evo & Ofc. Justin Hill), and Tulsa (OK) Police Department (Ofc. Heath Brownell & Ofc. Grace Hobbs).
245	12	"10.25.19"	October 25, 2019	1.534
Guest analyst: Sgt. Sean "Sticks" Larkin of the Tulsa (OK) Police Department Gang Unit.; Special appearance of Live Rescue host Matt Iseman.; Departments and officers featured include: Richland County (SC) Sheriff's Department (Lt. Danny Brown & Cpl. Gavin Walmsley with K9 Emy), Nye County (NV) Sheriff's Office (Lt. Eric Murphy & Sgt. Alan Schrimpf), Lawrence (IN) Police Department (Ofc. Stuart Bishop & Ofc. Cory Whaley), East Providence (RI) Police Department (Sgt. Mike Pendergast & Ofc. Jay Rainville with K9 Chiko), Missoula County (MT) Sheriff's Office (Det. Mike Sunderland & Sgt. Josh Volinkaty), Tallahassee (FL) Police Department (Ofc. Brian Smith with K9 Evo & Ofc. Justin Hill), Tulsa (OK) Police Department (Ofc. Heath Brownell & Ofc. Darrell Ross), and Jefferson County (AL) Sheriff's Office (Cpl. Brandon Sunday & Cpl. Deanna Marshall).
246	13	"10.26.19"	October 26, 2019	1.518
Guest analyst: Sgt. Sean "Sticks" Larkin of the Tulsa (OK) Police Department Gang Unit.; Departments and officers featured include: Richland County (SC) Sheriff's Department (Dep. Kenneth Fitzsimmons & Cpl. Josh Robinson), Nye County (NV) Sheriff's Office (Sgt. Cory Fowles & Sgt. Alan Schrimpf), Lawrence (IN) Police Department (Ofc. Stuart Bishop & Ofc. Cory Whaley), East Providence (RI) Police Department (Insp. Craig Sroka & Ofc. Jay Rainville with K9 Chiko), Missoula County (MT) Sheriff's Office (Capt. Bill Burt & Sgt. Josh Volinkaty), Tallahassee (FL) Police Department (Ofc. Brian Smith with K9 Evo & Ofc. Justin Hill), Tulsa (OK) Police Department (Ofc. Wes Perkins & Ofc. Darrell Ross), and Jefferson County (AL) Sheriff's Office (Cpl. Brandon Sunday & Cpl. Deanna Marshall).
247	14	"11.01.19"	November 1, 2019	1.711
Guest analyst: Sgt. Sean "Sticks" Larkin of the Tulsa (OK) Police Department Gang Unit.; Departments and officers featured include: Richland County (SC) Sheriff's Department (Dep. Donnyray Campbell & Dep. Addy Perez), Nye County (NV) Sheriff's Office (Sgt. Cory Fowles & Lt. Eric Murphy), Lawrence (IN) Police Department (Ofc. Matt Weber & Ofc. Aaron Tate with K9 Max), East Providence (RI) Police Department (Ofc. Andrew DuBois & Ofc. Jay Rainville with K9 Chiko), Missoula County (MT) Sheriff's Office (Sgt. Ryan Prather & Sgt. Josh Volinkaty), Tallahassee (FL) Police Department (Ofc. Brian Smith with K9 Evo & Ofc. Justin Hill), Tulsa (OK) Police Department (Ofc. Jerod Lum & Ofc. Aaron Phillips), and Jefferson County (AL) Sheriff's Office (Cpl. Brandon Sunday & Cpl. Deanna Marshall).
248	15	"11.02.19"	November 2, 2019	1.696
Guest analyst: Sgt. Sean "Sticks" Larkin of the Tulsa (OK) Police Department Gang Unit.; Departments and officers featured include: Richland County (SC) Sheriff's Department (S/D Daniel Mulcahy & Cpl. Robert Furgal), Nye County (NV) Sheriff's Office (Sgt. Cory Fowles & Dep. Michael Mokeski), Lawrence (IN) Police Department (Ofc. Stuart Bishop & Ofc. Charles Kingery), East Providence (RI) Police Department (Insp. Craig Sroka & Ofc. Jay Rainville with K9 Chiko), Missoula County (MT) Sheriff's Office (Capt. Bill Burt & Cpl. Zachary Sargent), Tallahassee (FL) Police Department (Ofc. Brian Smith with K9 Evo & Ofc. Justin Hill), Tulsa (OK) Police Department (Ofc. Jerod Lum & Ofc. Aaron Phillips), and Jefferson County (AL) Sheriff's Office (Cpl. Brandon Sunday & Cpl. Deanna Marshall).
249	16	"11.08.19"	November 8, 2019	1.694
Guest analyst: Sgt. Sean "Sticks" Larkin of the Tulsa (OK) Police Department Gang Unit.; Departments and officers featured include: Richland County (SC) Sheriff's Department (Cpl. Kristy Boyles & Cpl. Gavin Walmsley with K9 Emy), Nye County (NV) Sheriff's Office (Sgt. Cory Fowles & Sgt. Alan Schrimpf), Lawrence (IN) Police Department (Ofc. Adam Hazelwood with K9 Chedo & Capt. Tracey Cantrell), East Providence (RI) Police Department (Ofc. Jacob Mount & Cpl. Steve Tiernan), Missoula County (MT) Sheriff's Office (Capt. Bill Burt & Dep. Garrett Koppes), Tallahassee (FL) Police Department (Ofc. Brian Smith with K9 Evo & Ofc. Justin Hill), Tulsa (OK) Police Department (Ofc. Melissa Townsend & Ofc. Aaron Phillips), and Jefferson County (AL) Sheriff's Office (Cpl. Brandon Sunday & Cpl. Deanna Marshall).
250	17	"11.09.19"	November 9, 2019	1.769
Guest analyst: Sgt. Sean "Sticks" Larkin of the Tulsa (OK) Police Department Gang Unit.; Departments and officers featured include: Richland County (SC) Sheriff's Department (Lt. Danny Brown & Dep. Kenneth Fitzsimmons), Nye County (NV) Sheriff's Office (Lt. Eric Murphy & Sgt. Alan Schrimpf), Lawrence (IN) Police Department (Ofc. Stuart Bishop & Ofc. Charles Kingery), East Providence (RI) Police Department (Ofc. Jacob Mount & Ofc. Kyle Graves), Missoula County (MT) Sheriff's Office (Capt. Bill Burt & Cpl. Zachary Sargent), Tallahassee (FL) Police Department (Ofc. Brian Smith with K9 Evo & Ofc. Justin Hill), Tulsa (OK) Police Department (Ofc. Brian Liang & Ofc. Camden Houck), and Jefferson County (AL) Sheriff's Office (Cpl. Brandon Sunday & Cpl. Deanna Marshall).
251	18	"11.15.19"	November 15, 2019	1.909
Guest analyst: Ofc. Darrell Ross of the Tulsa (OK) Police Department.; First episode to feature twelve departments.; Departments and officers featured include: Richland County (SC) Sheriff's Department (Inv. Kevin Lawrence & Inv. Chris Mastrianni), Nye County (NV) Sheriff's Office (Lt. Eric Murphy & Dep. Chad Barrett), Lawrence (IN) Police Department (Ofc. Jason Heiney & Capt. Tracey Cantrell), East Providence (RI) Police Department (Ofc. Jacob Mount & Ofc. Andrew DuBois), Missoula County (MT) Sheriff's Office (Capt. Bill Burt & Cpl. Troy Rexin), Tallahassee (FL) Police Department (Ofc. Brian Smith with K9 Evo & Ofc. Justin Hill), Tulsa (OK) Police Department (Ofc. Melissa Townsend & Ofc. Michael Fullbright), Jefferson County (AL) Sheriff's Office (Cpl. Brandon Sunday & Cpl. Deanna Marshall), Mission (TX) Police Department (Ofc. Juan Mercado), Terre Haute (IN) Police Department (Ofc. Justin Gant & Ofc. Daniel Johnson), Bradford County (FL) Sheriff's Office (M/D Tanner Foreman & Dep. Haley Flynn), and Berkeley County (SC) Sheriff's Department (Cpl. Tyler Clark with K9 Fox & PFC Austin Longieliere).
252	19	"11.16.19"	November 16, 2019	1.813
Guest analyst: Ofc. Darrell Ross of the Tulsa (OK) Police Department.; Departments and officers featured include: Richland County (SC) Sheriff's Department (Dep. Donnyray Campbell & Dep. Addy Perez), Nye County (NV) Sheriff's Office (Capt. David Boruchowitz & Sgt. Cory Fowles), Lawrence (IN) Police Department (Ofc. Jason Heiney & Ofc. Adam Hazelwood with K9 Chedo), East Providence (RI) Police Department (Insp. Craig Sroka & Sgt. Mike Pendergast), Missoula County (MT) Sheriff's Office (Capt. Bill Burt & Dep. Garrett Koppes), Tallahassee (FL) Police Department (Ofc. Brian Smith with K9 Evo & Ofc. Justin Hill), Tulsa (OK) Police Department (Ofc. Jerod Lum & Ofc. Camden Houck), Jefferson County (AL) Sheriff's Office (Cpl. Brandon Sunday & Cpl. Deanna Marshall), Mission (TX) Police Department (Ofc. John Oliva), Terre Haute (IN) Police Department (Ofc. Jeff Pupilli & Ofc. Ryan Plasse), Bradford County (FL) Sheriff's Office (M/D Tanner Foreman & Dep. Haley Flynn), and Berkeley County (SC) Sheriff's Department (Cpl. Tyler Clark with K9 Fox & PFC Dezmon Drayton).
253	20	"11.22.19"	November 22, 2019	1.817
Guest analyst: Sgt. Sean "Sticks" Larkin of the Tulsa (OK) Police Department Gang Unit.; Departments and officers featured include: Richland County (SC) Sheriff's Department (M/D Chris Blanding & Cpl. Kristy Boyles), Nye County (NV) Sheriff's Office (Lt. Eric Murphy & Lt. James McRae), Lawrence (IN) Police Department (Ofc. Jason Heiney & Ofc. Stuart Bishop), East Providence (RI) Police Department (Ofc. Ryan Cute & Ofc. Jay Rainville with K9 Chiko), Missoula County (MT) Sheriff's Office (Capt. Bill Burt & Cpl. Troy Rexin), Tallahassee (FL) Police Department (Ofc. Brian Smith with K9 Evo & Ofc. Justin Hill), Tulsa (OK) Police Department (Ofc. Jerod Lum & Ofc. Melissa Townsend), Jefferson County (AL) Sheriff's Office (Cpl. Brandon Sunday & Cpl. Deanna Marshall), Mission (TX) Police Department (Ofc. John Oliva & Ofc. Juan Mercado), Terre Haute (IN) Police Department (Ofc. Justin Gant & Ofc. Ryan Plasse), Bradford County (FL) Sheriff's Office (Dep. Jake Whitehead & Sgt. Brandon Shoup with K9 Grim), and Berkeley County (SC) Sheriff's Department (Cpl. Tyler Clark with K9 Fox & PFC Dezmon Drayton).
254	21	"11.23.19"	November 23, 2019	1.788
Guest analyst: Sgt. Sean "Sticks" Larkin of the Tulsa (OK) Police Department Gang Unit.; Departments and officers featured include: Richland County (SC) Sheriff's Department (S/D Daniel Mulcahy & Cpl. Josh Robinson), Nye County (NV) Sheriff's Office (Dep. Chad Barrett & Sgt. Cory Fowles), Lawrence (IN) Police Department (Lt. Thomas Wright & Ofc. Stuart Bishop), East Providence (RI) Police Department (Ofc. Jacob Mount & Insp. Craig Sroka), Missoula County (MT) Sheriff's Office (Capt. Bill Burt & Dep. Justin White), Tallahassee (FL) Police Department (Ofc. Brian Smith with K9 Evo & Ofc. Justin Hill), Tulsa (OK) Police Department (Ofc. Brian Liang & Ofc. Camden Houck), Jefferson County (AL) Sheriff's Office (Cpl. Brandon Sunday & Cpl. Deanna Marshall), Mission (TX) Police Department (Ofc. John Oliva & Ofc. Juan Mercado), Terre Haute (IN) Police Department (Ofc. Pete Frederick & Ofc. Daniel Johnson), Bradford County (FL) Sheriff's Office (Dep. Jake Whitehead & Sgt. Brandon Shoup with K9 Grim), and Berkeley County (SC) Sheriff's Department (Cpl. Tyler Clark with K9 Fox & Cpl. Mike Thompson).
255	22	"11.29.19"	November 29, 2019	1.961
Guest analyst: Sgt. Sean "Sticks" Larkin of the Tulsa (OK) Police Department Gang Unit.; Departments and officers featured include: Richland County (SC) Sheriff's Department (Lt. Danny Brown & Cpl. Robert Furgal), Nye County (NV) Sheriff's Office (Dep. Cody Murphy & Sgt. Cory Fowles), Lawrence (IN) Police Department (Sgt. Gabe Slaybaugh & Ofc. Stuart Bishop), East Providence (RI) Police Department (Cpl. Steve Tiernan & Ofc. Andrew DuBois), Missoula County (MT) Sheriff's Office (Capt. Bill Burt & Dep. Garrett Koppes), Tallahassee (FL) Police Department (Ofc. Brian Smith with K9 Evo & Ofc. Justin Hill), Tulsa (OK) Police Department (Ofc. Jill Salle & Ofc. Justin McAlpin), Jefferson County (AL) Sheriff's Office (Dep. Nicholas Talton & Cpl. Ryan Holley), Mission (TX) Police Department (Ofc. John Oliva & Ofc. Juan Mercado), Terre Haute (IN) Police Department (Ofc. Justin Gant & Ofc. Daniel Johnson), Bradford County (FL) Sheriff's Office (Dep. Jacob Swaggerty & Sgt. Hannah Haas), and Berkeley County (SC) Sheriff's Department (Cpl. Tyler Clark with K9 Fox & Lt. Neal Johnson).
256	23	"11.30.19"	November 30, 2019	2.003
Guest analyst: Sgt. Sean "Sticks" Larkin of the Tulsa (OK) Police Department Gang Unit.; Departments and officers featured include: Richland County (SC) Sheriff's Department (S/D Garo Brown & Dep. Brandon Simmons), Nye County (NV) Sheriff's Office (Dep. Cody Murphy & Dep. Chad Barrett), Lawrence (IN) Police Department (Ofc. Jason Heiney & Ofc. Stuart Bishop), East Providence (RI) Police Department (Ofc. Kyle Graves & Insp. Craig Sroka), Missoula County (MT) Sheriff's Office (Capt. Bill Burt & Cpl. Troy Rexin), Tallahassee (FL) Police Department (Ofc. Brian Smith with K9 Evo & Ofc. Justin Hill), Tulsa (OK) Police Department (Ofc. Jill Salle & Ofc. Justin Finney), Jefferson County (AL) Sheriff's Office (Dep. Nicholas Talton & Cpl. Ryan Holley), Mission (TX) Police Department (Ofc. John Oliva & Ofc. Juan Mercado), Terre Haute (IN) Police Department (Ofc. Daniel Johnson), Bradford County (FL) Sheriff's Office (Dep. Jacob Swaggerty & Sgt. Hannah Haas), and Berkeley County (SC) Sheriff's Department (Dep. Dezmon Drayton & Lt. Neal Johnson).
257	24	"12.06.19"	December 6, 2019	1.791
Guest analyst: Sgt. Sean "Sticks" Larkin of the Tulsa (OK) Police Department Gang Unit.; Departments and officers featured include: Richland County (SC) Sheriff's Department (M/D Chris Blanding & Cpl. Kristy Boyles), Nye County (NV) Sheriff's Office (Sgt. Corey Fowles & Dep. Michael Connelly), Lawrence (IN) Police Department (Capt. Tracey Cantrell & Ofc. Stuart Bishop), East Providence (RI) Police Department (Ofc. Kyle Graves & Cpl. Steve Tiernan), Missoula County (MT) Sheriff's Office (Capt. Bill Burt & Dep. Garrett Koppes), Tallahassee (FL) Police Department (Ofc. Brian Smith with K9 Evo & Ofc. Justin Hill), Tulsa (OK) Police Department (Ofc. Cassie Moore & Ofc. Justin Finney), Jefferson County (AL) Sheriff's Office (Cpl. Brandon Sunday & Cpl. Deanna Marshall), Mission (TX) Police Department (Ofc. John Oliva & Ofc. Juan Mercado), Terre Haute (IN) Police Department (Ofc. Travis Clements & Sgt. Adam Loudermilk with K9 Vader), Bradford County (FL) Sheriff's Office (Dep. Jacob Swaggerty & Dep. Jake Whitehead), and Berkeley County (SC) Sheriff's Department (Cpl. Steve Zubkoff & Dep. Austin Longieliere).
258	25	"12.07.19"	December 7, 2019	1.625
Guest analyst: Sgt. Sean "Sticks" Larkin of the Tulsa (OK) Police Department Gang Unit.; Departments and officers featured include: Richland County (SC) Sheriff's Department (Lt. Danny Brown & Dep. Kenneth Fitzsimmons), Nye County (NV) Sheriff's Office (Sgt. Corey Fowles & Sgt. Alan Schrimpf), Lawrence (IN) Police Department (Ofc. Aaron Tate with K9 Max & Ofc. Charles Kingery), East Providence (RI) Police Department (Ofc. Kyle Graves & Insp. Craig Sroka), Missoula County (MT) Sheriff's Office (Capt. Bill Burt & Sgt. Josh Volinkaty), Tallahassee (FL) Police Department (Ofc. Brian Smith with K9 Evo & Ofc. Justin Hill), Tulsa (OK) Police Department (Ofc. Cassie Moore & Sgt. David Weakley), Jefferson County (AL) Sheriff's Office (Dep. Zandar Patterson & Cpl. Deanna Marshall), Mission (TX) Police Department (Ofc. John Oliva & Ofc. Juan Mercado), Terre Haute (IN) Police Department (Ofc. Justin Gant & Ofc. Pete Frederick), Bradford County (FL) Sheriff's Office (Sgt. Brandon Shoup with K9 Grim & Dep. Jake Whitehead), and Berkeley County (SC) Sheriff's Department (Cpl. Tyler Clark with K9 Fox & Cpl. Mike Thompson).
259	26	"12.13.19"	December 13, 2019	1.827
Guest analyst: Sgt. Sean "Sticks" Larkin of the Tulsa (OK) Police Department Gang Unit.; Departments and officers featured include: Richland County (SC) Sheriff's Department (S/D Garo Brown & Dep. Donnyray Campbell), Nye County (NV) Sheriff's Office (Lt. Eric Murphy & Dep. Chad Barrett), Lawrence (IN) Police Department (Ofc. Jason Heiney & Ofc. Matt Hickey with K9 Axel), East Providence (RI) Police Department (Ofc. Kyle Graves & Ofc. Jay Rainville with K9 Chiko), Missoula County (MT) Sheriff's Office (Capt. Bill Burt & Dep. Justin White), Tallahassee (FL) Police Department (Ofc. Brian Smith with K9 Evo & Ofc. Justin Hill), Tulsa (OK) Police Department (Ofc. Cassie Moore & Ofc. Justin Finney), Jefferson County (AL) Sheriff's Office (Cpl. Brandon Sunday & Cpl. Deanna Marshall), Mission (TX) Police Department (Ofc. Miguel Godinez & Ofc. Juan Mercado), Terre Haute (IN) Police Department (Ofc. Ryan Plasse & Ofc. Pete Frederick), Bradford County (FL) Sheriff's Office (Dep. Frank Krol with K9 Mambo & Sgt. Hannah Haas), and Berkeley County (SC) Sheriff's Department (Lt. Neal Johnson & Cpl. Steve Zubkoff).
260	27	"12.14.19"	December 14, 2019	2.061
Guest analyst: Sgt. Sean "Sticks" Larkin of the Tulsa (OK) Police Department Gang Unit.; Departments and officers featured include: Richland County (SC) Sheriff's Department (Lt. Danny Brown & S/D Daniel Mulcahy), Nye County (NV) Sheriff's Office (Lt. James McRae & Dep. Chad Barrett), Lawrence (IN) Police Department (Ofc. Jason Heiney & Ofc. Matt Hickey with K9 Axel), East Providence (RI) Police Department (Ofc. Andrew DuBois & Ofc. Jay Rainville with K9 Chiko), Missoula County (MT) Sheriff's Office (Capt. Bill Burt & Dep. Garrett Koppes), Tallahassee (FL) Police Department (Ofc. Brian Smith with K9 Evo & Ofc. Justin Hill), Tulsa (OK) Police Department (Ofc. Cassie Moore & Ofc. Justin Finney), Jefferson County (AL) Sheriff's Office (Cpl. Brandon Sunday & Cpl. Deanna Marshall), Mission (TX) Police Department (Ofc. Juan Mercado), Terre Haute (IN) Police Department (Ofc. Ryan Plasse & Ofc. Travis Clements), Bradford County (FL) Sheriff's Office (Dep. Frank Krol with K9 Mambo & Sgt. Hannah Haas), and Berkeley County (SC) Sheriff's Department (Cpl. Tyler Clark with K9 Fox & Dep. Austin Longieliere).
261	28	"01.03.20"	January 3, 2020	1.948
Guest analysts: Sgt. Sean "Sticks" Larkin of the Tulsa (OK) Police Department Gang Unit and Sgt. Mark Tappan with K9 Mattis of the Alpharetta (GA) Police Department.; Departments and officers featured include: Richland County (SC) Sheriff's Department (Lt. Danny Brown & Dep. Addy Perez), Nye County (NV) Sheriff's Office (Lt. Eric Murphy & Dep. Cody Murphy), Lawrence (IN) Police Department (Ofc. Stuart Bishop & Capt. Tracey Cantrell), Missoula County (MT) Sheriff's Office (Capt. Bill Burt & Dep. Garrett Koppes), Tallahassee (FL) Police Department (Ofc. Brian Smith with K9 Evo & Ofc. Justin Hill), Tulsa (OK) Police Department (Ofc. Darrell Ross & Ofc. Justin Finney), Terre Haute (IN) Police Department (Ofc. Chris Jones & Ofc. Lance Sanders with K9 Taco), Berkeley County (SC) Sheriff's Department (Cpl. Kathryn Whetstone & Lt. Neal Johnson), and Pomona (CA) Police Department (Ofc. Eric Omahony & Ofc. Shreef Erfan).
262	29	"01.04.20"	January 4, 2020	1.713
Guest analysts: Sgt. Sean "Sticks" Larkin of the Tulsa (OK) Police Department Gang Unit and Sgt. Mark Tappan with K9 Mattis of the Alpharetta (GA) Police Department.; Departments and officers featured include: Richland County (SC) Sheriff's Department (Cpl. Mark Laureano & M/D Chris Blanding), Nye County (NV) Sheriff's Office (Dep. Brooke Gentry & Dep. Cody Murphy), Lawrence (IN) Police Department (Ofc. Stuart Bishop & Ofc. Matt Hickey with K9 Axel), Missoula County (MT) Sheriff's Office (Capt. Bill Burt & Dep. Garrett Koppes), Tallahassee (FL) Police Department (Ofc. Brian Smith with K9 Evo & Ofc. Justin Hill), Tulsa (OK) Police Department (Ofc. Heath Brownell & Ofc. Justin Finney), Terre Haute (IN) Police Department (Ofc. Pete Frederick & Sgt. Adam Loudermilk with K9 Vader), Berkeley County (SC) Sheriff's Department (Cpl. Kathryn Whetstone & Cpl. Corinthian Green), and Pomona (CA) Police Department (Ofc. Eric Omahony & Ofc. Shreef Erfan).
263A	30A	"01.08.20 (Hour 1)"	January 8, 2020	1.274
Guest analyst: Sgt. Sean "Sticks" Larkin of the Tulsa (OK) Police Department Gang Unit.; Departments and officers featured include: Richland County (SC) Sheriff's Department (Cpl. Gavin Walmsley with K9 Emy & Cpl. Kristy Boyles), Nye County (NV) Sheriff's Office (Lt. Eric Murphy & Lt. James McRae), Lawrence (IN) Police Department (Ofc. Charles Kingery & Ofc. Aaron Tate with K9 Max), Missoula County (MT) Sheriff's Office (Capt. Bill Burt & Cpl. Troy Rexin), Tallahassee (FL) Police Department (Ofc. Brian Smith with K9 Evo & Ofc. Justin Hill), Tulsa (OK) Police Department (Ofc. Darrell Ross & Ofc. Justin Finney & Ofc. Justin McAlpin), Terre Haute (IN) Police Department (Ofc. Pete Frederick & Sgt. Adam Loudermilk with K9 Vader), Berkeley County (SC) Sheriff's Department (Cpl. Tyler Clark with K9 Fox & Dep. Neil McSwain with K9 Agis), and Pomona (CA) Police Department (Ofc. Eric Omahony & Ofc. Rodney Cavanaugh & Cpl. Joe Hernandez with K9 Sarg).
263B	30B	"01.08.20 (Hour 2)"	January 8, 2020	1.104
Guest analysts: Sgt. Sean "Sticks" Larkin of the Tulsa (OK) Police Department Gang Unit and Officer David Cochran with K9 Falco of the Fargo (ND) Police Department, winners of episode one of America's Top Dog.; Departments and officers featured include: Richland County (SC) Sheriff's Department (Cpl. Gavin Walmsley with K9 Emy & Cpl. Kristy Boyles), Nye County (NV) Sheriff's Office (Lt. Eric Murphy & Lt. James McRae), Lawrence (IN) Police Department (Ofc. Charles Kingery & Ofc. Aaron Tate with K9 Max), Missoula County (MT) Sheriff's Office (Capt. Bill Burt & Cpl. Troy Rexin), Tallahassee (FL) Police Department (Ofc. Brian Smith with K9 Evo & Ofc. Justin Hill), Tulsa (OK) Police Department (Ofc. Darrell Ross & Ofc. Justin Finney & Ofc. Justin McAlpin), Terre Haute (IN) Police Department (Ofc. Pete Frederick & Sgt. Adam Loudermilk with K9 Vader), Berkeley County (SC) Sheriff's Department (Cpl. Tyler Clark with K9 Fox & Dep. Neil McSwain with K9 Agis), and Pomona (CA) Police Department (Ofc. Eric Omahony & Ofc. Rodney Cavanaugh & Cpl. Joe Hernandez with K9 Sarg).
264	31	"01.10.20"	January 10, 2020	1.978
Guest analyst: Sgt. Sean "Sticks" Larkin of the Tulsa (OK) Police Department Gang Unit.; Departments and officers featured include: Richland County (SC) Sheriff's Department (Dep. Donnyray Campbell & Dep. Brandon Simmons), Nye County (NV) Sheriff's Office (Lt. Eric Murphy & Dep. Chad Barrett), Lawrence (IN) Police Department (Ofc. Charles Kingery & Capt. Tracey Cantrell), Missoula County (MT) Sheriff's Office (Capt. Bill Burt & Dep. Gordy Jessop), Tallahassee (FL) Police Department (Ofc. Brian Smith with K9 Evo & Ofc. Justin Hill), Tulsa (OK) Police Department (Ofc. Grace Hobbs & Ofc. Justin Finney & Ofc. Justin McAlpin), Terre Haute (IN) Police Department (Ofc. Pete Frederick & Sgt. Justin Sears with K9 Ossy), Berkeley County (SC) Sheriff's Department (Dep. Austin Longieliere & Cpl. Kathryn Whetstone), and Pomona (CA) Police Department (Ofc. Eric Omahony & Ofc. Rodney Cavanaugh & Ofc. Shreef Erfan).
265	32	"01.11.20"	January 11, 2020	1.617
Guest analyst: Sgt. Sean "Sticks" Larkin of the Tulsa (OK) Police Department Gang Unit.; Departments and officers featured include: Richland County (SC) Sheriff's Department (S/D Daniel Mulcahy & Dep. Durrell Barry), Nye County (NV) Sheriff's Office (Dep. Aaron Williamson & Dep. Chad Barrett), Lawrence (IN) Police Department (Ofc. Stuart Bishop & Ofc. Matt Hickey with K9 Axel), Missoula County (MT) Sheriff's Office (Capt. Bill Burt & Dep. Gordy Jessop), Tallahassee (FL) Police Department (Ofc. Brian Smith with K9 Evo & Ofc. Justin Hill), Tulsa (OK) Police Department (Ofc. Joshua Hyman & Ofc. Joel Burks), Terre Haute (IN) Police Department (Ofc. Pete Frederick & Sgt. Justin Sears with K9 Ossy), Berkeley County (SC) Sheriff's Department (Cpl. Tyler Clark with K9 Fox & Lt. Neal Johnson), and Pomona (CA) Police Department (Ofc. Eric Omahony & Ofc. Rodney Cavanaugh & Ofc. Shreef Erfan).
266A	33A	"01.15.20 (Hour 1)"	January 15, 2020	1.221
Guest analyst: Sgt. Sean "Sticks" Larkin of the Tulsa (OK) Police Department Gang Unit.; Departments and officers featured include: Richland County (SC) Sheriff's Department (Lt. Danny Brown & S/D Daniel Mulcahy), Nye County (NV) Sheriff's Office (Lt. Eric Murphy & Dep. Chad Barrett), Lawrence (IN) Police Department (Ofc. Stuart Bishop & Ofc. Charles Kingery), Tallahassee (FL) Police Department (Ofc. Brian Smith with K9 Evo & Ofc. Justin Hill), Tulsa (OK) Police Department (Ofc. Cassie Moore & Ofc. Heath Brownell), Terre Haute (IN) Police Department (Ofc. Chris Jones & Sgt. Adam Loudermilk with K9 Vader), Berkeley County (SC) Sheriff's Department (Cpl. Tyler Clark with K9 Fox & Dep. Neil McSwain with K9 Agis), and Pomona (CA) Police Department (Ofc. Eric Omahony & Ofc. Rodney Cavanaugh & Ofc. Luis Jimenez).
266B	33B	"01.15.20 (Hour 2)"	January 15, 2020	0.999
Guest analysts: Sgt. Sean "Sticks" Larkin of the Tulsa (OK) Police Department Gang Unit and Ofc. Matt Rhodes with K9 Bear of the Cocoa (FL) Police Department, winners of episode two of America's Top Dog.; Departments and officers featured include: Richland County (SC) Sheriff's Department (Lt. Danny Brown & S/D Daniel Mulcahy), Nye County (NV) Sheriff's Office (Lt. Eric Murphy & Dep. Chad Barrett), Lawrence (IN) Police Department (Ofc. Stuart Bishop & Ofc. Charles Kingery), Tallahassee (FL) Police Department (Ofc. Brian Smith with K9 Evo & Ofc. Justin Hill), Tulsa (OK) Police Department (Ofc. Cassie Moore & Ofc. Heath Brownell), Terre Haute (IN) Police Department (Ofc. Chris Jones & Sgt. Adam Loudermilk with K9 Vader), Berkeley County (SC) Sheriff's Department (Cpl. Tyler Clark with K9 Fox & Dep. Neil McSwain with K9 Agis), and Pomona (CA) Police Department (Ofc. Eric Omahony & Ofc. Rodney Cavanaugh & Ofc. Luis Jimenez).
267	34	"01.17.20"	January 17, 2020	1.788
Guest analyst: Sgt. Sean "Sticks" Larkin of the Tulsa (OK) Police Department Gang Unit.; Departments and officers featured include: Richland County (SC) Sheriff's Department (Cpl. Chris Blanding & Dep. Kenneth Fitzsimmons), Nye County (NV) Sheriff's Office (Lt. Eric Murphy & Dep. Brooke Gentry), Lawrence (IN) Police Department (Ofc. Jason Heiney & Ofc. Charles Kingery), Tallahassee (FL) Police Department (Ofc. Brian Smith with K9 Evo & Ofc. Justin Hill), Tulsa (OK) Police Department (Ofc. Joshua Hyman & Ofc. Heath Brownell), Terre Haute (IN) Police Department (Ofc. Pete Frederick & Ofc. Anthony Mazzon with K9 Pelkes), Bradford County (FL) Sheriff's Office (Dep. Brandon Chester & Dep. Hayley Flynn), Berkeley County (SC) Sheriff's Department (Cpl. Steve Zubkoff & Cpl. Corinthian Green), and Pomona (CA) Police Department (Ofc. Eric Omahony & Ofc. Rodney Cavanaugh & Ofc. Megan Gonzalez).
268	35	"01.18.20"	January 18, 2020	1.744
Guest analyst: Sgt. Sean "Sticks" Larkin of the Tulsa (OK) Police Department Gang Unit.; Departments and officers featured include: Richland County (SC) Sheriff's Department (Cpl. Gavin Walmsley with K9 Emy & Cpl. Kristy Boyles), Nye County (NV) Sheriff's Office (Dep. Chad Barrett & Dep. Brooke Gentry), Lawrence (IN) Police Department (Ofc. Aaron Tate with K9 Max & Capt. Tracey Cantrell), Tallahassee (FL) Police Department (Ofc. Brian Smith with K9 Evo & Ofc. Justin Hill), Tulsa (OK) Police Department (Ofc. Joshua Hyman & Ofc. Grace Hobbs), Terre Haute (IN) Police Department (Ofc. Pete Frederick & Ofc. Anthony Mazzon with K9 Pelkes), Bradford County (FL) Sheriff's Office (Dep. Brandon Chester & Dep. Hayley Flynn), Berkeley County (SC) Sheriff's Department (Cpl. Steve Zubkoff & Lt. Neal Johnson), and Pomona (CA) Police Department (Sgt. Mark Medellin & Ofc. James Shinn & Ofc. Shreef Erfan).
269	36	"01.24.20"	January 24, 2020	1.820
Guest analyst: Insp. Craig Sroka of the East Providence (RI) Police Department.; Departments and officers featured include: Richland County (SC) Sheriff's Department (Lt. Danny Brown & Lt. Steven Tapler), Nye County (NV) Sheriff's Office (Lt. Eric Murphy & Dep. Michael Mokeski), Lawrence (IN) Police Department (Ofc. Aaron Tate with K9 Max & Capt. Tracey Cantrell), Tallahassee (FL) Police Department (Ofc. Brian Smith with K9 Evo & Ofc. Justin Hill), Tulsa (OK) Police Department (Ofc. Michael Fullbright & Ofc. Grace Hobbs), Terre Haute (IN) Police Department (Ofc. Pete Frederick & Ofc. Chris Jones), Bradford County (FL) Sheriff's Office (Dep. Frank Krol with K9 Mambo & Dep. Michael Garmon), Berkeley County (SC) Sheriff's Department (Cpl. Kathryn Whetstone & Dep. Neil McSwain with K9 Agis), and Pomona (CA) Police Department (Ofc. Eric Omahony & Ofc. Rodney Cavanaugh & Ofc. Megan Gonzalez).
270	37	"01.25.20"	January 25, 2020	1.961
Guest analyst: Insp. Craig Sroka of the East Providence (RI) Police Department.; Departments and officers featured include: Richland County (SC) Sheriff's Department (Dep. Brandon Simmons & Cpl. Robert Furgal), Nye County (NV) Sheriff's Office (Dep. Chad Barrett & Dep. Brooke Gentry), Lawrence (IN) Police Department (Ofc. Stuart Bishop & Ofc. Charles Kingery), Tallahassee (FL) Police Department (Ofc. Brian Smith with K9 Evo & Ofc. Justin Hill), Tulsa (OK) Police Department (Ofc. Heath Brownell & Ofc. Melissa Townsend), Terre Haute (IN) Police Department (Ofc. Pete Frederick & Ofc. Chris Jones), Bradford County (FL) Sheriff's Office (Dep. Brandon Chester & Dep. Michael Garmon), Berkeley County (SC) Sheriff's Department (Dep. Austin Longieliere & Dep. Dezmon Drayton), and Pomona (CA) Police Department (Sgt. Mark Medellin & Ofc. James Shinn & Ofc. Megan Gonzalez).
271	38	"01.31.20"	January 31, 2020	1.725
Guest analyst: Sgt. Sean "Sticks" Larkin of the Tulsa (OK) Police Department Gang Unit.; Departments and officers featured include: Richland County (SC) Sheriff's Department (Lt. Danny Brown & Cpl. Kristy Boyles), Nye County (NV) Sheriff's Office (Lt. James McRae & Dep. Brooke Gentry), Lawrence (IN) Police Department (Capt. Tracey Cantrell & Ofc. Aaron Tate with K9 Max), Tallahassee (FL) Police Department (Ofc. Brian Smith with K9 Evo & Ofc. Justin Hill), Tulsa (OK) Police Department (Ofc. Joshua Hyman & Ofc. Melissa Townsend), Terre Haute (IN) Police Department (Ofc. Pete Frederick & Ofc. Chris Jones), Bradford County (FL) Sheriff's Office (M/D Jacob Swaggerty & Dep. Hayley Flynn), Berkeley County (SC) Sheriff's Department (Lt. Neal Johnson & Cpl. Corinthian Green), and Pomona (CA) Police Department (Ofc. Eric Omahony & Ofc. Rodney Cavanaugh & Ofc. Manny Rodriguez).
272	39	"02.01.20"	February 1, 2020	2.031
Guest analyst: Sgt. Sean "Sticks" Larkin of the Tulsa (OK) Police Department Gang Unit.; Departments and officers featured include: Richland County (SC) Sheriff's Department (Dep. Donnyray Campbell & Dep. Kenneth Fitzsimmons), Nye County (NV) Sheriff's Office (Lt. Eric Murphy & Sgt. Cory Fowles), Lawrence (IN) Police Department (Ofc. Charles Kingery & Ofc. Jason Heiney), Tallahassee (FL) Police Department (Ofc. Brian Smith with K9 Evo & Ofc. Justin Hill), Tulsa (OK) Police Department (Ofc. Joshua Hyman & Ofc. Darrell Ross), Terre Haute (IN) Police Department (Ofc. Anthony Mazzon with K9 Pelkes & Ofc. Chris Jones), Bradford County (FL) Sheriff's Office (M/D Jacob Swaggerty & Dep. Hayley Flynn), Berkeley County (SC) Sheriff's Department (Lt. Neal Johnson & Cpl. Steve Zubkoff), and Pomona (CA) Police Department (Ofc. Alex Nguyen & Ofc. Frank Wilson & Ofc. Shreef Erfan).
273	40	"02.07.20"	February 7, 2020	1.701
Guest analyst: Sgt. Sean "Sticks" Larkin of the Tulsa (OK) Police Department Gang Unit.; Departments and officers featured include: Richland County (SC) Sheriff's Department (S/D Addy Perez & Dep. Durrell Barry), Nye County (NV) Sheriff's Office (Lt. James McRae & Dep. Brooke Gentry), Lawrence (IN) Police Department (Capt. Tracey Cantrell & Ofc. Stuart Bishop), Tallahassee (FL) Police Department (Ofc. Jamey Martinez & Ofc. Justin Hill), Tulsa (OK) Police Department (Ofc. Melissa Townsend & Ofc. Grace Hobbs), Bradford County (FL) Sheriff's Office (Sgt. Hannah Haas & Dep. Michael Garmon), Berkeley County (SC) Sheriff's Department (Cpl. Tyler Clark with K9 Fox & Dep. Austin Longieliere), and Pomona (CA) Police Department (Ofc. Eric Omahony & Ofc. Rodney Cavanaugh & Ofc. Manny Rodriguez).
274	41	"02.08.20"	February 8, 2020	2.016
Guest analyst: Sgt. Sean "Sticks" Larkin of the Tulsa (OK) Police Department Gang Unit.; Departments and officers featured include: Richland County (SC) Sheriff's Department (S/D Daniel Mulcahy & Dep. Donnyray Campbell), Nye County (NV) Sheriff's Office (Sgt. Cory Fowles & Dep. Brooke Gentry), Lawrence (IN) Police Department (Sgt. Gabriel Slaybaugh & Ofc. Stuart Bishop), Tallahassee (FL) Police Department (Ofc. Jamey Martinez & Ofc. Justin Hill), Tulsa (OK) Police Department (Ofc. Joshua Hyman & Ofc. Darrell Ross), Bradford County (FL) Sheriff's Office (Sgt. Hannah Haas & Dep. Michael Garmon), Berkeley County (SC) Sheriff's Department (Cpl. Tyler Clark with K9 Fox & Dep. Devonte Carr), and Pomona (CA) Police Department (Sgt. Mark Medellin & Ofc. James Shinn & Ofc. Shreef Erfan).
275	42	"02.14.20"	February 14, 2020	1.762
Guest analyst: Sgt. Sean "Sticks" Larkin of the Tulsa (OK) Police Department Gang Unit.; Departments and officers featured include: Richland County (SC) Sheriff's Department (Lt. Danny Brown & Cpl. Chris Blanding), Nye County (NV) Sheriff's Office (Lt. Eric Murphy & Dep. Brooke Gentry), Lawrence (IN) Police Department (Capt. Tracey Cantrell & Ofc. Jason Heiney), Tallahassee (FL) Police Department (Ofc. Bobby Amos & Ofc. Justin Hill), Tulsa (OK) Police Department (Ofc. Melissa Townsend & Ofc. Darrell Ross), Bradford County (FL) Sheriff's Office (M/D Tanner Foreman & Dep. Hayley Flynn), Berkeley County (SC) Sheriff's Department (Cpl. Corinthian Green & Cpl. Kathryn Whetstone), and Pomona (CA) Police Department (Ofc. Alex Nguyen & Ofc. Frank Wilson & Ofc. Megan Gonzalez).
276	43	"02.15.20"	February 15, 2020	1.901
Guest analyst: Sgt. Sean "Sticks" Larkin of the Tulsa (OK) Police Department Gang Unit.; Departments and officers featured include: Richland County (SC) Sheriff's Department (Lt. Danny Brown & M/D Bryce Hughes), Nye County (NV) Sheriff's Office (Lt. Eric Murphy & Dep. Aaron Williamson), Lawrence (IN) Police Department (Ofc. Charles Kingery & Ofc. Adam Hazelwood with K9 Chedo), Tallahassee (FL) Police Department (Ofc. Brian Smith with K9 Evo & Ofc. Justin Hill), Tulsa (OK) Police Department (Ofc. Cassie Moore & Ofc. Grace Hobbs), Bradford County (FL) Sheriff's Office (M/D Tanner Foreman & Dep. Hayley Flynn), Berkeley County (SC) Sheriff's Department (Lt. Neal Johnson & Cpl. Steve Zubkoff), and Pomona (CA) Police Department (Ofc. Eric Omahony & Ofc. Rodney Cavanaugh & Ofc. Manny Rodriguez).
277	44	"02.21.20"	February 21, 2020	1.833
Guest analyst: Sgt. Sean "Sticks" Larkin of the Tulsa (OK) Police Department Gang Unit.; Departments and officers featured include: Richland County (SC) Sheriff's Department (S/D Daniel Mulcahy & Cpl. Robert Furgal), Nye County (NV) Sheriff's Office (Lt. Eric Murphy & Dep. Chad Barrett), Lawrence (IN) Police Department (Ofc. Charles Kingery & Ofc. Stuart Bishop), Tallahassee (FL) Police Department (Ofc. Brian Smith with K9 Evo & Ofc. Justin Hill), Tulsa (OK) Police Department (Ofc. Joshua Hyman & Ofc. Darrell Ross), Bradford County (FL) Sheriff's Office (Dep. Michael Garmon & Sgt. Hannah Haas), Berkeley County (SC) Sheriff's Department (Cpl. Tyler Clark with K9 Fox & Dep. Austin Longieliere), and Pomona (CA) Police Department (Ofc. Eric Omahony & Ofc. Rodney Cavanaugh & Ofc. Shreef Erfan).
278	45	"02.22.20"	February 22, 2020	1.987
Guest analyst: Sgt. Sean "Sticks" Larkin of the Tulsa (OK) Police Department Gang Unit.; Departments and officers featured include: Richland County (SC) Sheriff's Department (Lt. Danny Brown & M/D Aldonyia Brooks), Nye County (NV) Sheriff's Office (Lt. James McRae & Sgt. Alan Schrimpf), Lawrence (IN) Police Department (Ofc. Jason Heiney & Ofc. Aaron Tate with K9 Max), Tallahassee (FL) Police Department (Ofc. Brian Smith with K9 Evo & Ofc. Justin Hill), Tulsa (OK) Police Department (Ofc. Cassie Moore & Ofc. Heath Brownell), Bradford County (FL) Sheriff's Office (Dep. Michael Garmon & Sgt. Hannah Haas), Berkeley County (SC) Sheriff's Department (Dep. Devonte Carr & Dep. Austin Longieliere), and Pomona (CA) Police Department (Sgt. Mark Medellin & Ofc. James Shinn & Ofc. Manny Rodriguez).
279	46	"02.28.20"	February 28, 2020	1.940
Guest analyst: Sgt. Sean "Sticks" Larkin of the Tulsa (OK) Police Department Gang Unit.; Departments and officers featured include: Richland County (SC) Sheriff's Department (Cpl. Kristy Boyles & S/D Addy Perez), Nye County (NV) Sheriff's Office (Dep. Chad Barrett & Dep. Amanda Christen), Lawrence (IN) Police Department (Capt. Tracey Cantrell & Ofc. Aaron Tate with K9 Max), Tallahassee (FL) Police Department (Ofc. Brian Smith with K9 Evo & Ofc. Justin Hill), Tulsa (OK) Police Department (Ofc. Darrell Ross & Ofc. Grace Hobbs), Bradford County (FL) Sheriff's Office (Cpl. Tanner Foreman & Dep. Hayley Flynn), Berkeley County (SC) Sheriff's Department (Cpl. Corinthian Green & Cpl. Kathryn Whetstone), and Pomona (CA) Police Department (Ofc. Eric Omahony & Ofc. Rodney Cavanaugh & Sgt. Rick Aguiar).
280	47	"02.29.20"	February 29, 2020	2.054
Guest analyst: Sgt. Sean "Sticks" Larkin of the Tulsa (OK) Police Department Gang Unit.; Departments and officers featured include: Richland County (SC) Sheriff's Department (Lt. Danny Brown & S/D Daniel Mulcahy), Nye County (NV) Sheriff's Office (Lt. Eric Murphy & Dep. Chad Barrett), Lawrence (IN) Police Department (Ofc. Charles Kingery & Ofc. Jason Heiney), Tallahassee (FL) Police Department (Ofc. Brian Smith with K9 Evo & Ofc. Jamey Martinez), Tulsa (OK) Police Department (Ofc. Heath Brownell & Ofc. Grace Hobbs), Bradford County (FL) Sheriff's Office (Cpl. Tanner Foreman & Dep. Hayley Flynn), Berkeley County (SC) Sheriff's Department (Lt. Neal Johnson & Cpl. Kathryn Whetstone), and Pomona (CA) Police Department (Ofc. Alex Nguyen & Ofc. Frank Wilson & Ofc. Shreef Erfan).
281	48	"03.06.20"	March 6, 2020	1.751
Guest analysts: Cpl. Deanna Marshall & Cpl. Brandon Sunday of the Jefferson County (AL) Sheriff's Office and Sgt. Sean "Sticks" Larkin of the Tulsa (OK) Police Department Gang Unit.; Departments and officers featured include: Richland County (SC) Sheriff's Department (Lt. Danny Brown & M/D Bryce Hughes), Nye County (NV) Sheriff's Office (Dep. Brooke Gentry & Dep. Chad Barrett), Lawrence (IN) Police Department (Ofc. Matt Weber & Ofc. Jason Heiney), Tallahassee (FL) Police Department (Ofc. Brian Smith with K9 Evo & Ofc. Justin Hill), Tulsa (OK) Police Department (Ofc. Joshua Hyman & Ofc. Darrell Ross), Berkeley County (SC) Sheriff's Department (Dep. Austin Longieliere & Cpl. Tyler Clark with K9 Fox), Pomona (CA) Police Department (Ofc. Eric Omahony & Ofc. Rodney Cavanaugh & Sgt. Rick Aguiar), and Volusia County (FL) Sheriff's Office (Dep. Corey Charles & Dep. Royce James).
282	49	"03.07.20"	March 7, 2020	1.674
Guest analysts: Cpl. Deanna Marshall & Cpl. Brandon Sunday of the Jefferson County (AL) Sheriff's Office and Sgt. Sean "Sticks" Larkin of the Tulsa (OK) Police Department Gang Unit.; Departments and officers featured include: Richland County (SC) Sheriff's Department (Cpl. Gavin Walmsley with K9 Emy & M/D Bryce Hughes), Nye County (NV) Sheriff's Office (Dep. Brooke Gentry & Lt. James McRae), Lawrence (IN) Police Department (Capt. Tracey Cantrell & Ofc. Mateo Agresta), Tallahassee (FL) Police Department (Ofc. Brian Smith with K9 Evo & Ofc. Justin Hill), Tulsa (OK) Police Department (Ofc. Grace Hobbs & Ofc. Darrell Ross), Berkeley County (SC) Sheriff's Department (Dep. Austin Longieliere & Dep. Devonte Carr), Pomona (CA) Police Department (Sgt. Mark Medellin & Ofc. Alex Nguyen & Ofc. Manny Rodriguez), and Volusia County (FL) Sheriff's Office (Dep. Corey Charles & Dep. Royce James).
283	50	"03.13.20"	March 13, 2020	1.837
Guest analyst: Sgt. Sean "Sticks" Larkin of the Tulsa (OK) Police Department Gang Unit.; Departments and officers featured include: Richland County (SC) Sheriff's Department (Sgt. Robert Furgal & Dep. Emily Hampton), Nye County (NV) Sheriff's Office (Dep. Brooke Gentry & Dep. Cody Murphy), Lawrence (IN) Police Department (Capt. Tracey Cantrell & Ofc. Charles Kingery), Tallahassee (FL) Police Department (Ofc. Jamey Martinez & Ofc. Justin Hill), Tulsa (OK) Police Department (Ofc. Heath Brownell & Ofc. Jerod Lum), Berkeley County (SC) Sheriff's Department (Cpl. Corinthian Green & Cpl. Kathryn Whetstone), Pomona (CA) Police Department (Ofc. Eric Omahony & Ofc. Alex Nguyen & Sgt. Rick Aguiar), and Volusia County (FL) Sheriff's Office (Dep. Corey Charles & Sgt. Omar Bello).
284	51	"03.14.20"	March 14, 2020	2.008
Guest analyst: Sgt. Sean "Sticks" Larkin of the Tulsa (OK) Police Department Gang Unit.; Departments and officers featured include: Richland County (SC) Sheriff's Department (M/D Jacob Murphy & M/D Aldonyia Brooks), Nye County (NV) Sheriff's Office (Lt. Eric Murphy & Lt. James McRae), Lawrence (IN) Police Department (Ofc. Jason Heiney & Ofc. Adam Hazelwood with K9 Chedo), Tallahassee (FL) Police Department (Ofc. Jamey Martinez & Ofc. Justin Hill), Tulsa (OK) Police Department (Ofc. Cassie Moore & Ofc. Grace Hobbs), Berkeley County (SC) Sheriff's Department (Cpl. Steve Zubkoff & Cpl. Kimber Gist), Pomona (CA) Police Department (Sgt. Mark Medellin & Ofc. Eric Omahony & Ofc. Shreef Erfan), and Volusia County (FL) Sheriff's Office (Dep. Royce James & Sgt. Omar Bello).
N–A	N–A	"Live PD Special Edition 04.03.20"	April 3, 2020	1.180
Guest analysts: Sgt. Sean "Sticks" Larkin of the Tulsa (OK) Police Department Gang Unit, Sr. Detective Chuck Haw of the New Orleans (LA) Police Department, Paramedic Dan Flynn of the New Orleans EMS, and Lt. Grayson Kennedy of the Williamson County (TX) Police Department.; Special edition focusing on the beginning of the COVID-19 pandemic and its impact on emergency response teams around the United States.
N–A	N–A	"Live PD Special Edition 04.04.20"	April 4, 2020	1.255
Guest analysts: Sgt. Sean "Sticks" Larkin of the Tulsa (OK) Police Department Gang Unit, Sr. Detective Chuck Haw of the New Orleans (LA) Police Department, Paramedic Dan Flynn of the New Orleans EMS, and Lt. Grayson Kennedy of the Williamson County (TX) Police Department.; Special edition focusing on the beginning of the COVID-19 pandemic and its impact on emergency response teams around the United States.
285	52	"04.10.20"	April 10, 2020	1.786
Guest analyst: Sgt. Sean "Sticks" Larkin of the Tulsa (OK) Police Department Gang Unit.; Departments and officers featured include: Richland County (SC) Sheriff's Department (Lt. Danny Brown & Cpl. Mark Laureano), Lawrence (IN) Police Department (Ofc. Stuart Bishop & Capt. Tracey Cantrell), Berkeley County (SC) Sheriff's Department (Cpl. Steve Zubkoff & Cpl. Corinthian Green), Pomona (CA) Police Department (Ofc. Alex Nguyen, Ofc. Frank Wilson, & Ofc. Shreef Erfan), and Clay County (FL) Sheriff's Office (Dep. Brett Fortin).
286	53	"04.11.20"	April 11, 2020	2.049
Guest analyst: Sgt. Sean "Sticks" Larkin of the Tulsa (OK) Police Department Gang Unit.; Departments and officers featured include: Richland County (SC) Sheriff's Department (S/D Addy Perez & S/D Daniel Mulcahy), Lawrence (IN) Police Department (Ofc. Stuart Bishop & Ofc. Gabe Slaybaugh), Berkeley County (SC) Sheriff's Department (Cpl. Steve Zubkoff & Cpl. Corinthian Green), Pomona (CA) Police Department (Sgt. Mark Medellin, Ofc. Eric Omahony, & Ofc. Shreef Erfan), and Clay County (FL) Sheriff's Office (Dep. Jordon Spaulding).
287	54	"04.17.20"	April 17, 2020	1.912
Guest analyst: Sgt. Sean "Sticks" Larkin of the Tulsa (OK) Police Department Gang Unit.; Departments and officers featured include: Richland County (SC) Sheriff's Department (Lt. Danny Brown & Dep. Tyler Hazel), Lawrence (IN) Police Department (Ofc. Mateo Agresta & Ofc. Derek Byerly), Berkeley County (SC) Sheriff's Department (Cpl. Kimber Gist & Cpl. Tyler Clark), and Pomona (CA) Police Department (Sgt. Mark Medellin, Ofc. Frank Wilson, & Ofc. Manny Rodriguez).
288	55	"04.18.20"	April 18, 2020	1.858
Guest analyst: Sgt. Sean "Sticks" Larkin of the Tulsa (OK) Police Department Gang Unit.; Departments and officers featured include: Richland County (SC) Sheriff's Department (Sgt. Robert Furgal), Williamson County (TX) Sheriff's Office (Lt. Grayson Kennedy & Dep. Zach Camden), Lawrence (IN) Police Department (Ofc. Mateo Agresta & Ofc. Derek Byerly), Berkeley County (SC) Sheriff's Department (Dep. Austion Longieliere & Dep. Devonte Carr), Pomona (CA) Police Department (Ofc. Rodney Cavanaugh, Ofc. Eric Omanhony, & Ofc. Shreef Erfan), and Clay County (FL) Sheriff's Office (Det. Chase Stivers).
289	56	"04.24.20"	April 24, 2020	1.735
Guest analyst: Sgt. Sean "Sticks" Larkin of the Tulsa (OK) Police Department Gang Unit.; Departments and officers featured include: Richland County (SC) Sheriff's Department (Dep. Donnyray Campbell & Dep. Brandon Simmons), Williamson County (TX) Sheriff's Office (Lt. Grayson Kennedy & Dep. Charles Duvall), Lawrence (IN) Police Department (Ofc. Stuart Bishop & Ofc. Cody Anderson), Berkeley County (SC) Sheriff's Department (Cpl. Steve Zubkoff & Cpl. Corinthian Green), Pomona (CA) Police Department (Ofc. Frank Wilson, Ofc. Alex Nguyen, & Ofc. Manny Rodriguez), and West Baton Rouge Sheriff's Office (Agt. Allen Connelly & Lt. Brett Cavaliere).
290	57	"04.25.20"	April 25, 2020	2.060
Guest analyst: Sgt. Sean "Sticks" Larkin of the Tulsa (OK) Police Department Gang Unit.; Departments and officers featured include: Richland County (SC) Sheriff's Department (S/D Addy Perez & Lt. Danny Brown), Williamson County (TX) Sheriff's Office (Lt. Grayson Kennedy & Dep. Charles Duvall), Lawrence (IN) Police Department (Ofc. Matt Hickey), Berkeley County (SC) Sheriff's Department (Cpl. Steve Zubkoff & Cpl. Corinthian Green), Pomona (CA) Police Department (Sgt. Mark Medellin, Ofc. Eric Omahony, & Ofc. Shreef Erfan), and West Baton Rouge Sheriff's Office (Sgt. Glenn Henegan).
291	58	"05.01.20"	May 1, 2020	1.851
Guest analyst: Sgt. Sean "Sticks" Larkin of the Tulsa (OK) Police Department Gang Unit and Chief Renee Hall of the Dallas Police Department.; Departments and officers featured include: Richland County (SC) Sheriff's Department (Dep. Donnyray Campbell), Williamson County (TX) Sheriff's Office (Lt. Grayson Kennedy & Dep. Charles Duvall), Lawrence (IN) Police Department (Ofc. Stuart Bishop), Berkeley County (SC) Sheriff's Department (Cpl. Tyler Clark) Clay County (FL) Sheriff's Office (?), and West Baton Rouge Sheriff's Office (Sgt. Glenn Henegan & Agt. James Lewis).
292	59	"05.02.20"	May 2, 2020	1.852
Guest analyst: Sgt. Sean "Sticks" Larkin of the Tulsa (OK) Police Department Gang Unit and Sheriff Ozzie Knezovich of the Spokane County Sheriff’s Office.; Departments and officers featured include: Richland County (SC) Sheriff's Department (M/D Bryce Hughes & Dep. Daniel Mulcahy), Williamson County (TX) Sheriff's Office (Dep. Jake Johnston), Lawrence (IN) Police Department (Sgt. Gabe Slaybaugh), Berkeley County (SC) Sheriff's Department (Dep. Austin Longieliere) Clay County (FL) Sheriff's Office (?), and West Baton Rouge Sheriff's Office (Sgt. Glenn Henegan, Agt. James Lewis, & Lt. Brett Cavaliere).
293	60	"05.08.20"	May 8, 2020	1.747
Guest analyst: Sgt. Sean "Sticks" Larkin of the Tulsa (OK) Police Department Gang Unit.; Departments and officers featured include: Richland County (SC) Sheriff's Department (Lt. Danny Brown & M/D Bryce Hughes), Williamson County (TX) Sheriff's Office (Lt. Grayson Kennedy & Dep. Charles Duvall), Lawrence (IN) Police Department (Ofc. Stuart Bishop), Berkeley County (SC) Sheriff's Department (Cpl. Kathryn Whetstone) Clay County (FL) Sheriff's Office (Lt. Scott Moreland & Det. Chase Stivers), West Baton Rouge Sheriff's Office (Sgt. Glenn Henegan, Agt. James Lewis, & Lt. Brett Cavaliere), and Tulsa (OK) Police Department (Ofc. Grace Hobbs).
294	61	"05.09.20"	May 9, 2020	1.944
Guest analyst: Sgt. Sean "Sticks" Larkin of the Tulsa (OK) Police Department Gang Unit.; Departments and officers featured include: Richland County (SC) Sheriff's Department (Dep. Emily Hampton & M/D Jacob Murphy), Williamson County (TX) Sheriff's Office (Dep. Sean Feldmann & Dep. Charles Duvall), Lawrence (IN) Police Department (Ofc. Stuart Bishop & Officer Cody Anderson), Berkeley County (SC) Sheriff's Department (Cpl. Kathryn Whetstone & Cpl. Daniel Lambert) Clay County (FL) Sheriff's Office (Dep. Andy McCrea & Dep. Jason Sydorowicz), West Baton Rouge Sheriff's Office (Sgt. Glenn Henegan, Agt. James Lewis, Lt. Brett Cavaliere, & Agt. Allen Connelly), and Tulsa (OK) Police Department (Ofc. Cassie Moore & Ofc. Joshua Hyman).
295	62	"05.15.20"	May 15, 2020	1.776
Guest analyst: Sgt. Sean "Sticks" Larkin of the Tulsa (OK) Police Department Gang Unit.; Departments and officers featured include: Richland County (SC) Sheriff's Department (Sgt. Robert Furgal & M/D Bryce Hughes), Williamson County (TX) Sheriff's Office (Dep. Mathew Decker & Dep. Rachael Carter), Lawrence (IN) Police Department (Ofc. Charlie Kingery & Ofc. Mateo Agresta), Berkeley County (SC) Sheriff's Department (Cpl. Kimber Gist & Dep. Devonte Carr) Clay County (FL) Sheriff's Office (Lt. Scott Moreland & Det. Cody Jett), West Baton Rouge Sheriff's Office (Sgt. Glenn Henegan, Agt. James Lewis, Lt. Brett Cavaliere, & Agt. Allen Connelly), and Tulsa (OK) Police Department (Sgt. Joel Ward & Ofc. Joshua Hyman).
296	63	"05.16.20"	May 16, 2020	2.100
Guest analyst: Sgt. Sean "Sticks" Larkin of the Tulsa (OK) Police Department Gang Unit.; Departments and officers featured include: Richland County (SC) Sheriff's Department (Dep. Donnyray Campbell & Lt. Danny Brown), Williamson County (TX) Sheriff's Office (Dep. Mathew Decker & Dep. Rachael Carter), Lawrence (IN) Police Department (Capt. Tracey Cantrell & Lt. Thomas Wright), Berkeley County (SC) Sheriff's Department (Cpl. Kimber Gist & Dep. Devonte Carr) Clay County (FL) Sheriff's Office (Sgt. Zach Cox & Dep. Reggie Hyatt), West Baton Rouge Sheriff's Office (Sgt. Glenn Henegan, Agt. James Lewis, Lt. Brett Cavaliere, & Agt. Allen Connelly), and Tulsa (OK) Police Department (Ofc. Heath Brownell & Ofc. Cassie Moore).
297	64	"05.22.20"	May 22, 2020	2.014
Guest analyst: Sgt. Sean "Sticks" Larkin of the Tulsa (OK) Police Department Gang Unit.; Departments and officers featured include: Richland County (SC) Sheriff's Department (S/D Daniel Mulcahy & S/D Addy Perez), Williamson County (TX) Sheriff's Office (Dep. Mark McKinney & Dep. Charles Duvall), Lawrence (IN) Police Department (Capt. Tracey Cantrell & Ofc. Charlie Kingery), Berkeley County (SC) Sheriff's Department (Cpl. Steve Zubkoff & Cpl. Daniel Lambert) Clay County (FL) Sheriff's Office (Dep. Andy McCrea & Dep. Jordon Spaulding), West Baton Rouge Sheriff's Office (Sgt. Glenn Henegan, Agt. James Lewis, Lt. Brett Cavaliere, & Agt. Allen Connelly), and Tulsa (OK) Police Department (Ofc. Skyler Hargrove & Ofc. Grace Hobbs).
298	65	"05.23.20"	May 23, 2020	2.019
Guest analyst: Sgt. Sean "Sticks" Larkin of the Tulsa (OK) Police Department Gang Unit.; Departments and officers featured include: Richland County (SC) Sheriff's Department (Dep. Emily Hampton & M/D Aldonyia Brooks), Williamson County (TX) Sheriff's Office (Dep. Mark McKinney & Dep. Charles Duvall), Lawrence (IN) Police Department (Ofc. Jason Heiney & Ofc. Charlie Kingery), Berkeley County (SC) Sheriff's Department (Cpl. Steve Zubkoff & Cpl. Katheryn Whetstone) Clay County (FL) Sheriff's Office (Dep. Andy McCrea & Sgt. Zach Cox), West Baton Rouge Sheriff's Office (Sgt. Glenn Henegan, Agt. James Lewis, Lt. Brett Cavaliere, & Agt. Allen Connelly), and Tulsa (OK) Police Department (Ofc. Skyler Hargrove & Ofc. Cassie Moore).

== Production ==
Ahead of the fourth season premiere on September 19, 2019, it was announced that Live PD would be returning to follow the Tulsa Oklahoma Police Department. Live PD had previously followed the department but they declined the option to renew their original contract when it ended in 2016. The Tulsa city mayor cited a reason for returning as beneficial experience. The Tallahassee Florida Police Department and the Missoula County Montana Sheriff's Office were also both announced to be joining the series. On October 17, 2019 it was announced that Live PD would be leaving the Salinas, California police department. Despite recent community backlash at the time, Salinas Mayor said that it was the production companies choice to leave the city stating "I understand they have some offers for other cities that are more exciting and faster-paced, someone told me that we were boring." The decision to leave the city comes less than two months after the network signed a new two-year contract with the department.

=== Impact of the COVID-19 pandemic ===
When the World Health Organization declared the COVID-19 pandemic to be a pandemic on March 11, 2020, Live PD was about to enter a previously scheduled two-week production hiatus following that week's episodes; the show had a hiatus for the NCAA Division I men's basketball tournament during its first three seasons. During the prescheduled hiatus, A&E announced some changes to the format of the show, which would require the presenters of the program to work from their own homes. As a result of this change, the Roll Call pre-show was temporarily discontinued after the March 14 episode, and the show itself was temporarily reduced to two hours each on Fridays and Saturdays. The episodes that were aired during the month of April focused on the impact of the pandemic on law enforcement officers. The normal format of the show would be restored beginning with the May 9 episode.

=== Impact of the murder of George Floyd and related protests ===
The 299th and 300th episodes of the show were originally scheduled to air on June 5, and 6, 2020, respectively, with a special episode planned for the 300th on June 6. Five hours before the episode was scheduled to air it was announced that both episodes had been pulled from the schedule amid nationwide protests that were a direct result of the murder of George Floyd. A&E stated in a press release that the decision not to air the episodes was made "out of respect for the families of George Floyd and others who have lost their lives" as well as the safety of those involved with the production of the series. Repeat episodes of spin-off series Live Rescue aired in the episodes place with new episodes of Live PD tentatively scheduled for June 12, and 13. However, the show was subsequently cancelled on June 10.
