= Tom Morris Jr. =

American television host

Tom Morris Jr. is an American television host and producer. He was a producer on America's Most Wanted (AMW) for three years, then became an on-air correspondent on the show through 2011. In 2016, he was hired as one of the original co-hosts of Live PD, which became the most successful show in A&E's history.

== Early life ==
Morris is the son of Dr. Eleanor Morris of Burgess, Virginia and the late Rev. T. Wright Morris. He graduated from Northumberland High School, in Heathsville, Virginia, in 1975. He earned his bachelor's degree in mass communications from Norfolk State University.

== Career ==
Morris' first job in television came while he was still in college, as an intern news writer in Norfolk, Virginia. After college, he worked as a courier with the White House press corps, and worked his way up to cameraman.

Morris left the press corps in the 1980s and took a job as an economic development specialist with Prince George's County in Maryland. In 1987, he joined the U.S. State Department's newly formed antiterrorism Embassy Task Group. He was assigned to Mogadishu, Somalia.

In 1993, Morris began working as a producer for America's Most Wanted. After three years of working on the show, the executive producer of the show assigned him to be an on-air correspondent for a murder case. He continued his on-air work for the show through 2011.

In 2016, Morris was contacted by the producers of Live PD to be a co-host alongside Dan Abrams. He worked on the show for the entirety of its run.

Morris' experience on AMW led to Live PD regularly featuring a "Wanted" segment during its episodes, starting in the first season. During season 2, Morris worked with Angeline Hartmann (who had also worked at AMW) at the National Center for Missing & Exploited Children to produce a regular "Missing" segment within the show as well. As Live PD grew in popularity, it spawned a number of spin-offs; one of those, Live PD: Wanted, was hosted by Morris solo.

In July 2026, Morris was brought on-board On Patrol: Live to become a regular co-host of alongside Abrams, Sean "Sticks" Larkin, Tom Rizzo, and Curtis Wilson. His first appearance was on July 31, 2026.

== Other endeavors ==
In 2019, Morris was added to the board of directors of the American Red Cross in greater New York. He is also the narrator for the A&E series, "Fugitives: Caught On Tape".
