= List of Live PD episodes =

This is a list of episodes of Live PD, a television series that follows police officers during their nighttime patrols, live broadcasting select encounters with the public.

The A&E network series premiered on October 28, 2016, with an initial order of eight two-hour episodes. On February 1, 2017, A&E announced that the season would consist of 21 episodes. The first season of the show ended on August 19, 2017, after 62 episodes. The second season began on October 6, 2017. On July 20, 2018, host Dan Abrams announced that a two-hour special would air before the premiere of Nightwatch Nation on A&E on August 16, 2018, at 8pm EDT. The second episode aired from 10:56 p.m. to midnight EDT, following the premiere of Nightwatch Nation. The second season ended on August 25, 2018, with a total of 82 episodes. The third season premiered on September 21, 2018. A&E announced the renewal of the series through 2019 for an additional 150 episodes before the season's premiere. On November 1, 2018, a special bonus episode aired from 8pm to 10pm EDT as a lead-in for the second season premiere of Live PD Presents: PD Cam. On December 5 and 12, 2018, special bonus episodes aired alongside the premiere episodes of "Border Live" on Discovery Channel from 8pm to 10pm EST. On January 3, 2019, a special bonus episode aired from 8pm to 10pm EST as a lead-in for the fifth season premiere of 60 Days In. On October 17, 2019, a special bonus episode aired from 8pm to 10pm EDT as a lead-in for the premiere of the spin-off series Live PD: Wanted.

During the course of the series, 298 episodes of Live PD aired, including two specials.

== Series overview ==
Season	Episodes	Originally released	
Season	Episodes	First released	Last released
1	62	October 28, 2016	August 19, 2017
2	81	October 6, 2017	August 25, 2018
3	90	September 21, 2018	August 24, 2019
4	65	September 20, 2019	May 23, 2020

== Episodes ==
=== Season 1 (2016–17) ===
No. overall	No. in season	Title	Original release date	U.S. viewers (millions)
1	1	"10.28.16"	October 28, 2016	0.776
2	2	"11.04.16"	November 4, 2016	0.728
3	3	"11.11.16"	November 11, 2016	0.831
4	4	"11.17.16"	November 17, 2016	0.790
5	5	"11.18.16"	November 18, 2016	0.786
6	6	"11.25.16"	November 25, 2016	0.852
7	7	"12.02.16"	December 2, 2016	0.936
8	8	"12.09.16"	December 9, 2016	0.894
9	9	"12.16.16"	December 16, 2016	1.192
10	10	"01.06.17"	January 6, 2017	1.081
11	11	"01.13.17"	January 13, 2017	1.124
12	12	"01.20.17"	January 20, 2017	1.009
13	13	"01.27.17"	January 27, 2017	1.086
14	14	"02.03.17"	February 3, 2017	0.998
15	15	"02.04.17"	February 4, 2017	1.036
16	16	"02.10.17"	February 10, 2017	1.116
17	17	"02.11.17"	February 11, 2017	1.076
18	18	"02.17.17"	February 17, 2017	1.014
19	19	"02.24.17"	February 24, 2017	1.034
20	20	"03.03.17"	March 3, 2017	1.081
21	21	"03.04.17"	March 4, 2017	0.989
22	22	"03.10.17"	March 10, 2017	1.082
23	23	"03.11.17"	March 11, 2017	1.023
24	24	"03.17.17"	March 17, 2017	1.202
25	25	"03.18.17"	March 18, 2017	1.295
26	26	"03.24.17"	March 24, 2017	1.106
27	27	"03.25.17"	March 25, 2017	1.186
28	28	"03.31.17"	March 31, 2017	1.310
29	29	"04.07.17"	April 7, 2017	1.267
30	30	"04.08.17"	April 8, 2017	1.204
31	31	"04.14.17"	April 14, 2017	1.301
32	32	"04.15.17"	April 15, 2017	1.283
33	33	"04.21.17"	April 21, 2017	1.265
34	34	"04.22.17"	April 22, 2017	1.263
35	35	"04.28.17"	April 28, 2017	1.282
36	36	"04.29.17"	April 29, 2017	1.555
37	37	"05.05.17"	May 5, 2017	1.426
38	38	"05.06.17"	May 6, 2017	1.466
39	39	"05.12.17"	May 12, 2017	1.198
40	40	"05.13.17"	Cancelled due to Power Outage	N/A
41	41	"06.02.17"	June 2, 2017	1.594
42	42	"06.03.17"	June 3, 2017	1.442
43	43	"06.09.17"	June 9, 2017	1.322
44	44	"06.10.17"	June 10, 2017	1.392
45	45	"06.16.17"	June 16, 2017	1.595
46	46	"06.17.17"	June 17, 2017	1.471
47	47	"06.23.17"	June 23, 2017	1.636
48	48	"06.24.17"	June 24, 2017	1.578
49	49	"07.07.17"	July 7, 2017	1.625
50	50	"07.08.17"	July 8, 2017	1.617
51	51	"07.14.17"	July 14, 2017	1.663
52	52	"07.15.17"	July 15, 2017	2.066
53	53	"07.21.17"	July 21, 2017	1.857
54	54	"07.22.17"	July 22, 2017	1.757
55	55	"07.28.17"	July 28, 2017	1.759
56	56	"07.29.17"	July 29, 2017	2.017
57	57	"08.04.17"	August 4, 2017	1.893
58	58	"08.05.17"	August 5, 2017	1.932
59	59	"08.11.17"	August 11, 2017	2.042
60	60	"08.12.17"	August 12, 2017	2.005
61	61	"08.18.17"	August 18, 2017	1.948
62	62	"08.19.17"	August 19, 2017	1.899

=== Season 2 (2017–18) ===
No. overall	No. in season	Title	Original release date	U.S. viewers (millions)
63	1	"10.06.17"	October 6, 2017	1.764
64	2	"10.07.17"	October 7, 2017	1.637
65	3	"10.13.17"	October 13, 2017	1.619
66	4	"10.14.17"	October 14, 2017	1.817
67	5	"10.20.17"	October 20, 2017	1.614
68	6	"10.21.17"	October 21, 2017	1.601
69	7	"10.27.17"	October 27, 2017	1.657
70	8	"10.28.17"	October 28, 2017	1.513
71	9	"11.03.17"	November 3, 2017	1.716
72	10	"11.04.17"	November 4, 2017	2.071
73	11	"11.10.17"	November 10, 2017	1.720
74	12	"11.11.17"	November 11, 2017	2.050
75	13	"11.17.17"	November 17, 2017	1.812
76	14	"11.18.17"	November 18, 2017	1.886
77	15	"11.24.17"	November 24, 2017	1.908
78	16	"11.25.17"	November 25, 2017	1.802
79	17	"12.01.17"	December 1, 2017	1.720
80	18	"12.02.17"	December 2, 2017	1.759
81	19	"12.08.17"	December 8, 2017	1.711
82	20	"12.09.17"	December 9, 2017	2.040
83	21	"12.15.17"	December 15, 2017	1.777
84	22	"12.16.17"	December 16, 2017	1.911
85	23	"01.05.18"	January 5, 2018	2.078
86	24	"01.06.18"	January 6, 2018	1.902
87	25	"01.12.18"	January 12, 2018	2.093
88	26	"01.13.18"	January 13, 2018	2.086
89	27	"01.19.18"	January 19, 2018	1.859
90	28	"01.20.18"	January 20, 2018	1.966
91	29	"01.26.18"	January 26, 2018	2.031
92	30	"01.27.18"	January 27, 2018	2.095
93	31	"02.02.18"	February 2, 2018	1.798
94	32	"02.03.18"	February 3, 2018	2.097
95	33	"02.16.18"	February 16, 2018	1.867
96	34	"02.17.18"	February 17, 2018	2.007
97	35	"02.23.18"	February 23, 2018	1.697
98	36	"02.24.18"	February 24, 2018	1.831
99	37	"03.02.18"	March 2, 2018	1.687
100	38	"03.03.18"	March 3, 2018	1.876
101	39	"03.09.18"	March 9, 2018	1.852
102	40	"03.10.18"	March 10, 2018	1.959
103	41	"03.16.18"	March 16, 2018	1.953
104	42	"03.17.18"	March 17, 2018	1.986
105	43	"03.23.18"	March 23, 2018	2.008
106	44	"03.24.18"	March 24, 2018	2.053
107	45	"04.06.18"	April 6, 2018	1.900
108	46	"04.07.18"	April 7, 2018	2.150
109	47	"04.13.18"	April 13, 2018	1.808
110	48	"04.14.18"	April 14, 2018	1.913
111	49	"04.20.18"	April 20, 2018	1.909
112	50	"04.21.18"	April 21, 2018	1.858
113	51	"04.27.18"	April 27, 2018	1.871
114	52	"04.28.18"	April 28, 2018	1.984
115	53	"05.04.18"	May 4, 2018	1.769
116	54	"05.05.18"	May 5, 2018	1.915
117	55	"05.11.18"	May 11, 2018	1.839
118	56	"05.12.18"	May 12, 2018	1.738
119	57	"06.01.18"	June 1, 2018	2.044
120	58	"06.02.18"	June 2, 2018	2.051
121	59	"06.08.18"	June 8, 2018	1.957
122	60	"06.09.18"	June 9, 2018	1.908
123	61	"06.15.18"	June 15, 2018	2.014
124	62	"06.16.18"	June 16, 2018	1.884
125	63	"06.22.18"	June 22, 2018	2.078
126	64	"06.23.18"	June 23, 2018	2.152
127	65	"06.29.18"	June 29, 2018	1.919
128	66	"06.30.18"	June 30, 2018	2.093
129	67	"07.13.18"	July 13, 2018	1.917
130	68	"07.14.18"	July 14, 2018	1.842
131	69	"07.20.18"	July 20, 2018	1.992
132	70	"07.21.18"	July 21, 2018	2.064
133	71	"07.27.18"	July 27, 2018	2.028
134	72	"07.28.18"	July 28, 2018	2.065
135	73	"08.03.18"	August 3, 2018	1.962
136	74	"08.04.18"	August 4, 2018	2.002
137	75	"08.10.18"	August 10, 2018	2.041
138	76	"08.11.18"	August 11, 2018	2.015
139	77	"08.16.18 (8PM - 10PM EDT) & (10:56PM - 12AM EDT)"	August 16, 2018	1.550
140	78	"08.17.18"	August 17, 2018	1.842
141	79	"08.18.18"	August 18, 2018	2.035
142	80	"08.24.18"	August 24, 2018	2.054
143	81	"08.25.18"	August 25, 2018	2.076

=== Season 3 (2018–19) ===
No. overall	No. in season	Title	Original release date	U.S. viewers (millions)
144	1	"09.21.18"	September 21, 2018	1.904
145	2	"09.22.18"	September 22, 2018	1.897
146	3	"09.28.18"	September 28, 2018	1.854
147	4	"09.29.18"	September 29, 2018	1.858
148	5	"10.05.18"	October 5, 2018	1.874
149	6	"10.06.18"	October 6, 2018	1.645
150	7	"10.12.18"	October 12, 2018	1.704
151	8	"10.13.18"	October 13, 2018	1.709
152	9	"10.19.18"	October 19, 2018	1.774
153	10	"10.20.18"	October 20, 2018	1.725
154	11	"10.26.18"	October 26, 2018	1.725
155	12	"10.27.18"	October 27, 2018	1.689
156	13	"11.01.18"	November 1, 2018	1.201
157	14	"11.02.18"	November 2, 2018	1.789
158	15	"11.03.18"	November 3, 2018	1.795
159	16	"11.09.18"	November 9, 2018	1.777
160	17	"11.10.18"	November 10, 2018	1.894
161	18	"11.16.18"	November 16, 2018	2.034
162	19	"11.17.18"	November 17, 2018	2.021
163	20	"11.23.18"	November 23, 2018	1.912
164	21	"11.24.18"	November 24, 2018	1.900
165	22	"11.30.18"	November 30, 2018	1.957
166	23	"12.01.18"	December 1, 2018	1.867
167	24	"12.05.18"	December 5, 2018	1.296
168	25	"12.07.18"	December 7, 2018	2.101
169	26	"12.08.18"	December 8, 2018	2.128
170	27	"12.12.18"	December 12, 2018	1.396
171	28	"12.14.18"	December 14, 2018	2.083
172	29	"12.15.18"	December 15, 2018	1.878
173	30	"01.03.19"	January 3, 2019	1.651
174	31	"01.04.19"	January 4, 2019	1.869
175	32	"01.05.19"	January 5, 2019	1.863
176	33	"01.11.19"	January 11, 2019	1.959
177	34	"01.12.19"	January 12, 2019	1.782
178	35	"01.18.19"	January 18, 2019	1.836
179	36	"01.19.19"	January 19, 2019	2.189
180	37	"01.25.19"	January 25, 2019	1.996
181	38	"01.26.19"	January 26, 2019	2.106
182	39	"02.01.19"	February 1, 2019	1.922
183	40	"02.02.19"	February 2, 2019	2.316
184	41	"02.08.19"	February 8, 2019	1.971
185	42	"02.09.19"	February 9, 2019	2.158
186	43	"02.15.19"	February 15, 2019	1.860
187	44	"02.16.19"	February 16, 2019	2.084
188	45	"02.22.19"	February 22, 2019	1.963
189	46	"02.23.19"	February 23, 2019	2.058
190	47	"03.01.19"	March 1, 2019	1.887
191	48	"03.02.19"	March 2, 2019	2.075
192	49	"03.08.19"	March 8, 2019	1.939
193	50	"03.09.19"	March 9, 2019	1.887
194	51	"03.29.19"	March 29, 2019	1.998
195	52	"03.30.19"	March 30, 2019	1.949
196	53	"04.05.19"	April 5, 2019	2.068
197	54	"04.06.19"	April 6, 2019	1.950
198	55	"04.12.19"	April 12, 2019	1.819
199	56	"04.13.19"	April 13, 2019	1.984
200	57	"04.19.19"	April 19, 2019	2.123
201	58	"04.20.19"	April 20, 2019	2.163
202	59	"04.26.19"	April 26, 2019	1.886
203	60	"04.27.19"	April 27, 2019	2.022
204	61	"05.01.19"	May 1, 2019	1.146
205	62	"05.03.19"	May 3, 2019	1.875
206	63	"05.04.19"	May 4, 2019	2.110
207	64	"05.10.19"	May 10, 2019	1.906
208	65	"05.11.19"	May 11, 2019	2.078
209	66	"05.31.19"	May 31, 2019	2.086
210	67	"06.01.19"	June 1, 2019	2.140
211	68	"06.07.19"	June 7, 2019	1.773
212	69	"06.08.19"	June 8, 2019	2.029
213	70	"06.12.19"	June 12, 2019	1.533
214	71	"06.14.19"	June 14, 2019	1.985
215	72	"06.15.19"	June 15, 2019	2.101
216	73	"06.19.19"	June 19, 2019	1.388
217	74	"06.21.19"	June 21, 2019	2.367
218	75	"06.22.19"	June 22, 2019	2.166
219	76	"07.12.19"	July 12, 2019	1.948
220	77	"07.13.19"	July 13, 2019	2.239
221	78	"07.19.19"	July 19, 2019	2.182
222	79	"07.20.19"	July 20, 2019	2.159
223	80	"07.26.19"	July 26, 2019	1.933
224	81	"07.27.19"	July 27, 2019	1.936
225	82	"07.30.19"	July 30, 2019	1.272
226	83	"08.02.19"	August 2, 2019	2.168
227	84	"08.03.19"	August 3, 2019	2.044
228	85	"08.09.19"	August 9, 2019	2.149
229	86	"08.10.19"	August 10, 2019	2.009
230	87	"08.16.19"	August 16, 2019	2.027
231	88	"08.17.19"	August 17, 2019	1.986
232	89	"08.23.19"	August 23, 2019	2.102
233	90	"08.24.19"	August 24, 2019	1.964

=== Season 4 (2019–20) ===
No. overall	No. in season	Title	Original release date	U.S. viewers (millions)
234	1	"09.20.19"	September 20, 2019	2.023
235	2	"09.21.19"	September 21, 2019	1.662
236	3	"09.27.19"	September 27, 2019	1.790
237	4	"09.28.19"	September 28, 2019	1.863
238	5	"10.04.19"	October 4, 2019	1.698
239	6	"10.05.19"	October 5, 2019	1.754
240	7	"10.11.19"	October 11, 2019	1.693
241	8	"10.12.19"	October 12, 2019	1.670
242	9	"10.17.19"	October 17, 2019	1.216
243	10	"10.18.19"	October 18, 2019	1.566
244	11	"10.19.19"	October 19, 2019	1.585
245	12	"10.25.19"	October 25, 2019	1.534
246	13	"10.26.19"	October 26, 2019	1.518
247	14	"11.01.19"	November 1, 2019	1.711
248	15	"11.02.19"	November 2, 2019	1.696
249	16	"11.08.19"	November 8, 2019	1.694
250	17	"11.09.19"	November 9, 2019	1.769
251	18	"11.15.19"	November 15, 2019	1.909
252	19	"11.16.19"	November 16, 2019	1.813
253	20	"11.22.19"	November 22, 2019	1.817
254	21	"11.23.19"	November 23, 2019	1.788
255	22	"11.29.19"	November 29, 2019	1.961
256	23	"11.30.19"	November 30, 2019	2.003
257	24	"12.06.19"	December 6, 2019	1.791
258	25	"12.07.19"	December 7, 2019	1.625
259	26	"12.13.19"	December 13, 2019	1.827
260	27	"12.14.19"	December 14, 2019	2.061
261	28	"01.03.20"	January 3, 2020	1.948
262	29	"01.04.20"	January 4, 2020	1.713
263A	30A	"01.08.20 (Hour 1)"	January 8, 2020	1.274
263B	30B	"01.08.20 (Hour 2)"	January 8, 2020	1.104
264	31	"01.10.20"	January 10, 2020	1.978
265	32	"01.11.20"	January 11, 2020	1.617
266A	33A	"01.15.20 (Hour 1)"	January 15, 2020	1.221
266B	33B	"01.15.20 (Hour 2)"	January 15, 2020	0.999
267	34	"01.17.20"	January 17, 2020	1.788
268	35	"01.18.20"	January 18, 2020	1.744
269	36	"01.24.20"	January 24, 2020	1.820
270	37	"01.25.20"	January 25, 2020	1.961
271	38	"01.31.20"	January 31, 2020	1.725
272	39	"02.01.20"	February 1, 2020	2.031
273	40	"02.07.20"	February 7, 2020	1.701
274	41	"02.08.20"	February 8, 2020	2.016
275	42	"02.14.20"	February 14, 2020	1.762
276	43	"02.15.20"	February 15, 2020	1.901
277	44	"02.21.20"	February 21, 2020	1.833
278	45	"02.22.20"	February 22, 2020	1.987
279	46	"02.28.20"	February 28, 2020	1.940
280	47	"02.29.20"	February 29, 2020	2.054
281	48	"03.06.20"	March 6, 2020	1.751
282	49	"03.07.20"	March 7, 2020	1.674
283	50	"03.13.20"	March 13, 2020	1.837
284	51	"03.14.20"	March 14, 2020	2.008
N–A	N–A	"Live PD Special Edition 04.03.20"	April 3, 2020	1.180
N–A	N–A	"Live PD Special Edition 04.04.20"	April 4, 2020	1.255
285	52	"04.10.20"	April 10, 2020	1.786
286	53	"04.11.20"	April 11, 2020	2.049
287	54	"04.17.20"	April 17, 2020	1.912
288	55	"04.18.20"	April 18, 2020	1.858
289	56	"04.24.20"	April 24, 2020	1.735
290	57	"04.25.20"	April 25, 2020	2.060
291	58	"05.01.20"	May 1, 2020	1.851
292	59	"05.02.20"	May 2, 2020	1.852
293	60	"05.08.20"	May 8, 2020	1.747
294	61	"05.09.20"	May 9, 2020	1.944
295	62	"05.15.20"	May 15, 2020	1.776
296	63	"05.16.20"	May 16, 2020	2.100
297	64	"05.22.20"	May 22, 2020	2.014
298	65	"05.23.20"	May 23, 2020	2.019
