= Live PD Presents: PD Cam =

- Also known as: PD Cam
- Genre: Reality
- Presented by: Sean "Sticks" Larkin
- Country of origin: United States
- Original language: English
- No. of seasons: 5
- No. of episodes: 87

Production
- Executive producers: Dan Cesareo; Lucilla D'Agostino; Rick Hankey; Pat Twist; John Zito; Sean Gottlieb; Shelly Tatro
- Producer: Evan Cutler
- Editors: Larilyn Sanchez; Jacob Serlen; Erik Hasslet; Jeremy Kessler; Rubin Polizzi; Fran Gullo
- Camera setup: Multi-camera
- Production company: Big Fish Entertainment

Original release
- Network: A&E
- Release: July 19, 2018 – March 18, 2020
- Release: January 8 – March 12, 2025

Related
- Live PD

Live PD Presents: PD Cam (often referred to as just PD Cam) is an American reality television series and spin-off of Live PD hosted by regular Live PD analyst Sean "Sticks" Larkin. The series premiered on A&E on July 19, 2018. Following Live PD's cancellation as a result of the murder of George Floyd, the program ceased airing new episodes in 2020; however, a fifth season later aired in 2025.

== Production ==
On July 4, 2018 A&E announced the development of a new series called PD Cam, set to premiere on July 19, 2018. Sergeant Sean "Sticks" Larkin of the Tulsa Police Department, already a regular analyst on Live PD, was chosen to host the series. The series was later repackaged as a Live PD spin-off under the title Live PD Presents: PD Cam. It features unfiltered video from police officers responding to calls from their body-worn, dashboard and helicopter cameras.

Speaking about the series, Larkin said that "law enforcement has gotten negative media coverage in recent years" and "the show will help police work become more transparent." A second season began on April 28, 2019 as part of an eleven-day "Ultimate Live PD marathon" followed by a third season that began on October 24, 2019.

== Episodes ==
=== Series overview ===
Season	Episodes		Originally released	
Season	Episodes		First released	Last released
1	18	6	July 19, 2018	August 9, 2018
1	18	12	November 1, 2018	December 13, 2018
Special			December 20, 2018	
2	14	8	April 28, 2019	May 5, 2019
2	14	6	June 6, 2019	June 26, 2019
3	14		October 24, 2019	December 12, 2019
Specials			December 19, 2019	December 26, 2019
4	18		January 22, 2020	March 18, 2020
5	20		January 8, 2025	March 12, 2025

=== Season 1 (2018) ===
No. overall	No. in season	Title	Original release date	U.S. viewers (millions)	18-49 rating
Part 1
1	1	"#101"	July 19, 2018	1.285	0.38
2	2	"#102"	July 19, 2018	1.229	0.38
3	3	"#103"	July 26, 2018	1.041	0.35
4	4	"#104"	July 26, 2018	1.023	0.34
5	5	"#105"	August 2, 2018	1.127	0.38
6	6	"#106"	August 9, 2018	1.334	0.48
Part 2
7	7	"#107"	November 1, 2018	1.131	0.36
8	8	"#108"	November 1, 2018	1.049	0.34
9	9	"#109"	November 8, 2018	1.048	0.32
10	10	"#110"	November 8, 2018	0.955	0.26
11	11	"#111"	November 15, 2018	1.062	0.26
12	12	"#112"	November 15, 2018	0.992	0.25
13	13	"#113"	November 29, 2018	1.151	0.30
14	14	"#114"	November 29, 2018	0.937	0.28
15	15	"#115"	December 6, 2018	1.244	0.36
16	16	"#116"	December 6, 2018	1.079	0.30
17	17	"#118"	December 13, 2018	1.074	0.27
18	18	"#117"	December 13, 2018	0.957	0.27
Special
19	19	"Top Ten Moments of 2018"	December 20, 2018	1.106	0.35

=== Season 2 (2019) ===
No. overall	No. in season	Title	Original release date	U.S. viewers (millions)	18-49 rating
Part 1
20	1	"#19"	April 28, 2019	1.150	0.26
21	2	"#20"	April 28, 2019	1.177	0.27
22	3	"#21"	April 28, 2019	0.998	0.25
23	4	"#22"	April 28, 2019	1.005	0.27
24	5	"#23"	May 5, 2019	0.907	0.25
25	6	"#24"	May 5, 2019	0.935	0.26
26	7	"#25"	May 5, 2019	0.944	0.27
27	8	"#26"	May 5, 2019	0.924	0.28
Part 2
28	9	"#27"	June 6, 2019	1.118	0.29
29	10	"#28"	June 6, 2019	1.038	0.28
30	11	"#29"	June 13, 2019	1.150	0.32
31	12	"#30"	June 13, 2019	1.260	0.35
32	13	"#31"	June 26, 2019	1.071	0.33
33	14	"#32"	June 26, 2019	1.089	0.35

=== Season 3 (2019) ===
No. overall	No. in season	Title	Original release date	U.S. viewers (millions)	18-49 rating
Season 3
34	1	"#33"	October 24, 2019	1.025	0.28
35	2	"#34"	October 24, 2019	1.208	0.29
36	3	"#35"	October 31, 2019	0.915	0.19
37	4	"#36"	October 31, 2019	0.905	0.18
38	5	"#37"	November 7, 2019	1.107	0.26
39	6	"#38"	November 7, 2019	1.012	0.25
40	7	"#39"	November 14, 2019	1.088	0.29
41	8	"#40"	November 14, 2019	1.029	0.28
42	9	"#41"	November 21, 2019	1.175	0.31
43	10	"#42"	November 21, 2019	1.222	0.33
44	11	"#44"	December 5, 2019	1.075	0.30
45	12	"#43"	December 5, 2019	1.177	0.33
46	13	"#45"	December 12, 2019	1.140	0.28
47	14	"#46"	December 12, 2019	1.203	0.29
Specials
48	15	"Top 20 Moments of 2019 - Part 1"	December 19, 2019	1.509	0.38
49	16	"Top 20 Moments of 2019 - Part 2"	December 26, 2019	1.430	0.44

=== Season 4 (2020) ===
No. overall	No. in season	Title	Original release date	U.S. viewers (millions)	18-49 rating
50	1	"#47"	January 22, 2020	1.124	0.30
51	2	"#48"	January 22, 2020	1.238	0.33
52	3	"#49"	January 29, 2020	1.005	0.25
53	4	"#50"	January 29, 2020	1.072	0.28
54	5	"#51"	February 5, 2020	1.015	0.28
55	6	"#52"	February 5, 2020	1.000	0.30
56	7	"#53"	February 12, 2020	1.001	0.25
57	8	"#54"	February 12, 2020	0.982	0.25
58	9	"#55"	February 19, 2020	0.976	0.24
59	10	"#56"	February 19, 2020	1.075	0.28
60	11	"#57"	February 26, 2020	0.835	0.18
61	12	"#58"	February 26, 2020	0.890	0.19
62	13	"#59"	March 4, 2020	0.967	0.22
63	14	"#60"	March 4, 2020	1.016	0.22
64	15	"#61"	March 11, 2020	0.826	0.18
65	16	"#62"	March 11, 2020	0.862	0.19
66	17	"#63"	March 18, 2020	0.872	0.21
67	18	"#64"	March 18, 2020	0.903	0.20

=== Season 5 (2025) ===
No. overall	No. in season	Title	Original release date	U.S. viewers (millions)	18-49 rating
68	1	"#65"	January 8, 2025	N/A	TBA
69	2	"#66"	January 8, 2025	N/A	TBA
70	3	"#67"	January 15, 2025	N/A	TBA
71	4	"#68"	January 15, 2025	N/A	TBA
72	5	"#69"	January 22, 2025	N/A	TBA
73	6	"#70"	January 22, 2025	N/A	TBA
74	7	"#71"	January 29, 2025	N/A	TBA
75	8	"#72"	January 29, 2025	N/A	TBA
76	9	"#73"	February 5, 2025	N/A	TBA
77	10	"#74"	February 5, 2025	N/A	TBA
78	11	"#75"	February 12, 2025	N/A	TBA
79	12	"#76"	February 12, 2025	N/A	TBA
80	13	"#77"	February 19, 2025	N/A	TBA
81	14	"#78"	February 19, 2025	N/A	TBA
82	15	"#79"	February 26, 2025	N/A	TBA
83	16	"#80"	February 26, 2025	N/A	TBA
84	17	"#81"	March 5, 2025	N/A	TBA
85	18	"#82"	March 5, 2025	N/A	TBA
86	19	"#83"	March 12, 2025	N/A	TBA
87	20	"#84"	March 12, 2025	N/A	TBA
