= Live PD Presents: Women on Patrol =

- Genre: Reality
- Narrated by: Gretchen Carlson
- Country of origin: United States
- Original language: English
- No. of seasons: 1
- No. of episodes: 34

Production
- Executive producers: Brie Miranda Bryant; Dan Cesareo; Joe Venafro; Juliet Barrack; Lucilla D'Agostino; Rick Hankey; Sean Gottlieb; Shelly Tatro
- Production locations: Jackson, Wyoming; Wilmington, North Carolina; Tempe, Arizona; Stockton, California
- Camera setup: Multi-camera
- Running time: 25 minutes
- Production company: Big Fish Entertainment

Original release
- Network: Lifetime
- Release: June 18 – November 5, 2018

Related
- Live PD

Live PD Presents: Women on Patrol is an American reality television series and spin-off of Live PD. The series premiered on Lifetime on June 18, 2018 and follows female law enforcement officers across the United States. It was ordered to series on April 25, 2018 and initially received a twenty-episode order. The episode order was later increased to forty, however, only thirty-four episodes aired.

== Production ==
On April 25, 2018 it was announced that Lifetime was developing a new series called Live PD Presents: Women on Patrol as a spin-off to A&E's Live PD. The series received a twenty-episode order and followed female law enforcement officers from departments in Jackson, Wyoming, Wilmington, North Carolina Tempe, Arizona, and Stockton, California. It was revealed on June 4, 2018 that Lifetime would be airing the series with Escaping Polygamy in a two-hour programming block hosted by Gretchen Carlson called "Justice for Women with Gretchen Carlson." Lifetime later ordered an additional twenty episodes of the series bringing the total episode count to forty episodes. Despite having a forty episode order only thirty-four episodes aired. In August 2018 it was confirmed that the Wilmington Police Department would be filming part of the second season of the series.

== Episodes ==
No.	Title	Original release date	U.S. viewers (millions)	18-49 rating
1	"Episode 101"	June 18, 2018	0.966	0.32
2	"Episode 102"	June 18, 2018	0.944	0.31
3	"Episode 103"	June 25, 2018	0.865	0.22
4	"Episode 104"	June 25, 2018	0.853	0.23
5	"Episode 105"	July 2, 2018	0.669	0.19
6	"Episode 106"	July 2, 2018	0.652	0.18
7	"Episode 107"	July 9, 2018	0.650	0.21
8	"Episode 108"	July 9, 2018	0.625	0.20
9	"Episode 109"	July 16, 2018	0.667	0.18
10	"Episode 110"	July 16, 2018	0.654	0.18
11	"Episode 111"	July 23, 2018	0.589	0.14
12	"Episode 112"	July 23, 2018	0.581	0.14
13	"Episode 113"	July 30, 2018	0.644	0.16
14	"Episode 114"	July 30, 2018	0.631	0.16
15	"Episode 115"	August 6, 2018	0.652	0.18
16	"Episode 116"	August 6, 2018	0.607	0.17
17	"Episode 117"	August 13, 2018	0.548	0.17
18	"Episode 118"	August 13, 2018	0.586	0.18
19	"Episode 119"	August 20, 2018	0.637	0.15
20	"Episode 120"	August 20, 2018	0.646	0.15
21	"Episode 121"	September 10, 2018	0.498	0.13
22	"Episode 122"	September 17, 2018	0.637	0.19
23	"Episode 123"	September 24, 2018	0.373	0.10
24	"Episode 124"	October 1, 2018	0.409	0.11
25	"Episode 125"	October 8, 2018	0.400	0.11
26	"Episode 126"	October 8, 2018	0.474	0.13
27	"Episode 127"	October 15, 2018	0.432	0.12
28	"Episode 128"	October 15, 2018	0.376	0.11
29	"Episode 129"	October 22, 2018	0.389	0.09
30	"Episode 130"	October 22, 2018	0.387	0.09
31	"Episode 131"	October 29, 2018	0.468	0.14
—	"Episode 132"	Unaired	N/A	N/A
32	"Episode 133"	October 29, 2018	0.399	0.12
33	"Episode 134"	November 5, 2018	0.337	0.08
34	"Episode 135"	November 5, 2018	0.319	0.06
—	"Episode 136"	Unaired	N/A	N/A
—	"Episode 137"	Unaired	N/A	N/A
—	"Episode 138"	Unaired	N/A	N/A
—	"Episode 139"	Unaired	N/A	N/A
—	"Episode 140"	Unaired	N/A	N/A
