= Killing of Javier Ambler =

2019 death during arrest in Austin, Texas

- Date: March 28, 2019; 7 years ago
- Location: Austin, Texas, U.S
- Deaths: Javier Ambler

On March 28, 2019, Javier Ambler II died of heart failure while being arrested by police in Austin, Texas, after fleeing from deputies who sought to stop him for a traffic violation. Ambler was tased multiple times by authorities. Video of Ambler's death, recorded by police officers, was obtained and released by news organizations in June 2020. During the arrest Ambler repeatedly stated "I can't breathe" and "please save me" before dying. Ambler's death was recorded by a Live PD television crew, and the recording has since been destroyed, according to A&E Networks.

== Javier Ambler II ==
Javier Ambler II was a 40-year-old Black man, a postal worker, and the father of two sons. His mother described him as a gentle giant and a great father. Ambler's father, who was in the U.S. Army, said that Javier "didn't know white from black or Latino from Filipino... Everything was green, Army green." Ambler lived in Pflugerville and had earlier played football at Ellison High School, Blinn College, and also attended Prairie View A&M University.

== Arrest and death ==
On March 28, 2019, sheriff's deputies tried to stop Ambler after they said that he did not dim his SUV lights to oncoming traffic. Ambler continued driving, leading to a 22-minute chase. After the 22 minute police chase and several minor collisions, the chase ended when Ambler crashed into a tree, on a North Austin Street. Ambler was unarmed and exited his car with his hands raised. According to the police report, Deputy Jason James Johnson, who was accompanied by a film crew of Live PD, told Ambler to "get down" five or six times, and then tased him. According to the police report, Ambler partially fell but tried to stand again, and was then tased in the upper back by Deputy Zach Camden. The report stated that Ambler further resisted, and was tased again by Johnson. According to news organizations deputies pinned Ambler down and tased him 3–4 times.

Video evidence released in June 2020 shows that Ambler pleaded with officers that he could not breathe and suffered from congestive heart failure. During the arrest Ambler said "I am not resisting" and "I have congestive heart failure." He called out "please save me" before deputies Johnson and Camden tased him for a final time. Ambler became motionless and unresponsive after officers placed handcuffs on him. During the arrest Johnson said "give me your hands or I'm going to tase you again," and Camden said "I'm pretty sure I just broke his finger."

Ambler's death was ruled a homicide, which officials said include "justifiable homicide", caused by congestive heart failure and hypertensive cardiovascular disease associated with morbid obesity "in combination with forcible restraint".

According to CBS Austin's reporting, Ambler may have been en route to the hospital during the chase, quoting Ambler's former partner that "...per police, it was never a high-speed chase. It was just, he couldn't stop in distress. This was not something he should have died for."

== Investigation ==
An internal affairs investigation found that Williamson County stated that its deputies "did nothing wrong" in Ambler's death.

In February 2020, KVUE and journalist Tony Plohetski learned of Ambler's death after they were contacted by investigators who were frustrated by failed efforts to acquire more information from the Sheriff's Office of Williamson County. In June 2020, the Austin American-Statesman and KVUE obtained police officer body camera footage of Ambler's death, after months of records requests. A&E then revealed it earlier destroyed its own footage due to a contract between Williamson County and Live PD producers in place at the time of Ambler's death.

A local watchdog played a pivotal role in bringing the Williamson County Sheriff’s Office under public fire. For over two years, Buddy Falcon maintained a steady stream of reporting critical of Sheriff Robert Chody’s leadership (KXAN). Identified by Patch as a "WilCo law enforcement watchdog," Falcon and associates successfully used public-records requests to obtain and expose internal-affairs documents and phone records, deepening the investigation into the department's practices.

On September 28, 2020, Williamson County Sheriff Robert Chody was indicted on a felony evidence tampering charge. Chody was accused of participating in the destruction of video evidence from his department's pursuit and arrest of Ambler. A pretrial hearing was held on January 4, 2021.

On March 30, 2021, a grand jury in Travis County, Texas indicted both James Johnson and Zachary Camden with manslaughter charges. Two days later, on April 1, Robert Chody turned himself in to Travis County authorities after being indicted for evidence tampering charges.

Johnson and Camden were both acquitted of all charges on March 7, 2024.

The cases against Chody and Jason Nassour were dismissed on July 1, 2026.

== Reactions ==
In the wake of the protests over the murder of George Floyd, A&E had already pulled Live PD from its schedule. On June 9, Live PD host Dan Abrams, who acts as ABC News' chief legal affairs anchor, promised Live PD fans that the show would eventually return. The next day, A&E announced that they had officially canceled the series.

Margaret Moore, the Travis County District Attorney, stated that Sheriff Robert Chody had refused to provide evidence. In response, three of Williamson County's four commissioners called for Chody's resignation.

Protests in reaction to Ambler's death were held outside the Williamson County Court on June 9, 2020.

== See also ==
- List of unarmed African Americans killed by law enforcement officers in the United States
- Human rights in the United States
- List of killings by law enforcement officers in the United States
- Police brutality in the United States
- "I can't breathe", phrase uttered by several African American men shortly before being killed by police
