= Live PD =

American television series documenting law enforcement in real-time

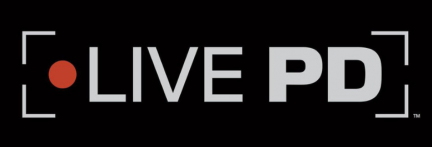
- Genre: Reality; Docuseries
- Presented by: Dan Abrams; Tom Morris Jr.; Sgt. Sean "Sticks" Larkin
- Country of origin: United States
- Original language: English
- No. of seasons: 4
- No. of episodes: 298 (list of episodes)

Production
- Executive producers: Dan Cesareo; David Doss; George McTeague; Kara Kurcz; John Zito; Elaine Frontain Bryant; Shelly Tatro; Sean Gottlieb
- Camera setup: Multiple
- Running time: 50–135 minutes
- Production company: Big Fish Entertainment

Original release
- Network: A&E
- Release: October 28, 2016 – May 23, 2020

Related
- Live PD: Police Patrol; Live PD: Rewind; Live PD: Roll Call; Live PD: Wanted; Live PD Presents: PD Cam; Live PD Presents: Top Ten Police Vehicles; Live PD Presents: Women on Patrol; Live Rescue; On Patrol: Live; PD Stories Podcast

Live PD is an American television program that aired on the A&E Network from 2016 to 2020. It follows police officers in the course of their patrols live, broadcasting interactions with the public. The show was hosted by Dan Abrams with analysis provided by Tom Morris Jr. and Sgt. Sean "Sticks" Larkin.

The program premiered on October 28, 2016, with an initial order from A&E for four two-hour episodes. On February 1, 2017, A&E announced that the season would be expanded to 21 episodes. The first season concluded on August 19, 2017, with the second season premiering on October 6, 2017. The second season concluded on August 25, 2018, with the third season premiering on September 21, 2018; that same month, A&E renewed the series for an additional 150 episodes, to run through 2019. The fourth season premiered on September 20, 2019. On May 7, 2020, the series was renewed for an additional 160 episodes. However, on June 10, 2020, A&E canceled the series in the wake of protests against police brutality following the murder of George Floyd and the destruction of the video footage of the killing of Javier Ambler.

At the time of cancellation, Live PD was the most watched show on A&E and the most watched show on cable during prime time on Friday. After the cancellation of Live PD, A&E's viewership went down 49% in the following months. On August 21, 2020, A&E began airing new episodes of spin-off series Live Rescue, which focuses on firefighters and EMTs, on Friday and Saturday nights in the same time slot.

Two of the three hosts began hosting a new show titled On Patrol: Live on Reelz on July 22, 2022. That show also runs for three hours every Friday and Saturday night.

== Overview ==
Live PD was hosted by Dan Abrams, the chief legal affairs anchor for ABC News. The program featured live video feeds from multiple law enforcement agencies throughout the United States. Departments included the Lawrence Police Department, Clay County Sheriff's Office, Richland County Sheriff's Department, Pasco County Sheriff's Office, Tulsa Police Department, Williamson County Sheriff's Office, Berkeley County Sheriff's Department, and the Pomona Police Department.

Abrams was joined in-studio by two co-analysts: former Washington, D.C., special police officer and crime reporter Tom Morris Jr. and Sgt. Sean "Sticks" Larkin of the Tulsa PD. Occasionally, the trio were joined by a law enforcement officer that had been featured on the show in the field.

Because of the risk of confidential or otherwise inappropriate material being aired, A&E imposed a broadcast delay on the show which may range from a few seconds to several minutes.

Live PD was frequently the top-rated cable program on Friday and Saturday nights.

Throughout the month of April 2020, Live PD was broadcast under an amended format which focused on the impact of the COVID-19 pandemic on police officers and first responders. In June 2020, A&E pulled episodes from its schedule in the wake of the murder of George Floyd by a police officer in Minneapolis, Minnesota.

== Episodes ==
Season	Episodes	Originally released	
Season	Episodes	First released	Last released
1	62	October 28, 2016	August 19, 2017
2	81	October 6, 2017	August 25, 2018
3	90	September 21, 2018	August 24, 2019
4	65	September 20, 2019	May 23, 2020

== Notable incidents ==
Due to the nature of live television, Live PD has captured incidents that may not have been aired on a traditional law enforcement program. One such event that received coverage was Bridgeport Police Department Sergeant Chris Robinson breaking down on camera after learning 13-month-old Michael Citron, suffering from an adverse reaction to antihistamine medication, had died following Robinson escorting an ambulance carrying the child to a local hospital.

In another incident, a family claimed to have recognized their loved one, 37-year-old Benjamin Johnson, deceased on television after what the Richland County Sheriff's Department said was a drug deal gone wrong. Two men were arrested in the case.

In an incident on a July 8, 2017 episode, Senior Deputy Chris Mastrianni was called to a fight in progress at a large house party when a car leaving the party passed him going about 90 mph. Mastrianni attempted to stop the vehicle, which then evaded him for several minutes. The car then turned a corner before jumping a curb, hitting a power pole's support wire and rolling over. The driver then crawled out the window of his vehicle with his 2-year-old daughter in his arms, and began fighting with Mastrianni. The man released his child, who was taken to safety by the Live PD field producer. After several minutes, Cpl. Mark Laureano and Senior Deputy Katelyn Jasak arrived on scene and aided Mastrianni in handcuffing and arresting the man, as well as pushing back the rapidly growing crowd of bystanders. The toddler received a broken arm in the incident.

In June 2020, it was revealed that Live PD had destroyed footage related to the March 28, 2019 police killing of Javier Ambler. Ambler, a 40-year-old black man, did not stop when deputies tried to pull him over for failing to dim his headlights. When Ambler finally left his car with his hands raised, he was tased multiple times and pinned by police, while pleading for his life and saying that he could not breathe. The network said it was "evaluating" the program in the wake of the worldwide George Floyd protests. In September 2020, Williamson County, Texas Sheriff Robert Chody was indicted and arrested by the county for evidence tampering charges after allegedly destroying video evidence of Ambler in police custody. Chody was indicted by neighboring Travis County on April 1, 2021, two days after the county indicted two of his former deputies on manslaughter charges for their actions.

== Cancellation ==
In May 2020, A&E ordered 160 new episodes of Live PD. After the murder of George Floyd by an on-duty police office, and the subsequent riots and protests in response, A&E halted production of new shows on June 6. On June 9, Abrams said on Twitter "To all of you asking whether #LivePD coming back. . .The answer is yes. All of us associated with the show are as committed to it as ever."

However, on June 10, 2020, A&E and producers Big Fish Entertainment announced that Live PD would cease production, effective immediately. In a statement, A&E said "This is a critical time in our nation’s history and we have made the decision to cease production on Live PD. Going forward, we will determine if there is a clear pathway to tell the stories of both the community and the police officers whose role it is to serve them. And with that, we will be meeting with community and civil rights leaders as well as police departments." Variety reported that A&E executives felt they had no choice after Paramount Network canceled Cops, even though they thought Live PD was a very different show.

Abrams appeared in several media outlets after the show was canceled, defending the show and its portrayal of police. He said he was "shocked & beyond disappointed" about its cancellation and added, "To the loyal #LivePDNation please know I, we, did everything we could to fight for you, and for our continuing effort at transparency in policing. I was convinced the show would go on." He said, "I think that it's very troubling that we're suddenly in a culture where all police officers have to … suffer for the sins of a few. And I say that for every group, it's not just police officers. That doesn't mean we don't have to have a discussion about the inequities in our society. And not just a discussion – action. There should be changes. ... There's a real positive change in many ways going on in this country, but there's also an overreaction going on. And I think that that's what 'Live PD' suffered from." He also said Live PD was a documentary-style show, not an entertainment show like Cops, and that the Live PD crew treated it very seriously. It is also indicated the cancellation was in part due to destruction of evidence.

At the time of cancellation, Live PD was the most popular show on A&E. In the month following its cancellation, viewership on A&E was down 49%.

On June 8, 2022, it was announced that a new program, On Patrol: Live, with a similar lineup of producers and hosts and a nearly identical format, would debut on the channel Reelz. The new program was universally described in media outlets as a revival or return of Live PD. On August 30, A&E Networks filed suit against Reelz and Big Fish, alleging that the new program violates A&E's intellectual property rights in the Live PD name and format.

== Associated programs ==
Live PD spawned various spin-offs on A&E, including:

- Live PD: Rewind: A previous episode of Live PD that has been edited down to about one hour.
- Live PD: Police Patrol: A half-hour, unhosted format that showed unaired footage and highlights from previous episodes. This series is currently in its fourth season.
- Live PD: Roll Call: A six-minute preview that aired an hour before each night's Live PD episode. It included that night's lineup of departments and officers and a previously unaired clip.
- Live PD Presents: Women on Patrol: A program depicting policing activities, focusing on the female members of law enforcement's perspective.
- Live PD Presents: PD Cam: Featured events captured by police body, dash, helicopter and associated surveillance cameras. Hosted by Sean 'Sticks' Larkin. Episodes run a half-hour each.
- PD Stories Podcast: A one-hour podcast hosted by Tom Morris Jr. The show revolved around interviewing members of law enforcement and personnel from associated organizations.
- Live Rescue: Featured live camera crew ride-alongs with fire departments and rescue squads in cities and towns across the country. This series premiered on Monday, April 22, 2019, at 9PM on the A&E Network. The last live episode aired in January 2021.
- Live PD Presents: Top Ten Police Vehicles: A television special hosted by Sgt. Sean "Sticks" Larkin counting down the top ten police vehicles from around the world. It aired on July 9, 2019, on the History Channel.
- Live PD: Wanted: Featured searches for fugitives wanted throughout the United States. This series premiered on Thursday, October 17, 2019, at 10PM on the A&E Network and was hosted by Tom Morris, Jr. The second season premiered on February 27, 2020.

=== Syndication ===
Edited half-hour episodes of the series began to be distributed by Sony Pictures Television in the 2018–19 season in broadcast syndication under the title Live PD: Police Patrol (including previous episodes of Women on Patrol); they were edited for content to meet daytime broadcast syndication standards to feature no audible commentary, and merely connected each segment with text of where the segment originated, along with the dispatched crime. The syndicated episodes were also a part of the national lineup of The CW Plus. A week after the cancellation of the parent series, SPT confirmed that Live PD: Police Patrol would be withdrawn from syndication after June 19, 2020.

== See also ==
- Critics' Choice Television Award for Best Unstructured Reality Show
- List of changes made due to the George Floyd protests
- List of television series revivals
- To Serve and Protect
