= Live PD: Roll Call =

- Genre: Reality; Docuseries
- Presented by: Dan Abrams; Tom Morris, Jr.; Sergeant Sean "Sticks" Larkin
- Country of origin: United States
- Original language: English
- No. of seasons: 4
- No. of episodes: 236

Production
- Executive producers: Dan Cesareo; David Doss; George McTeague; Kara Kurcz; John Zito; Elaine Frontain Bryant; Shelly Tatro; Sean Gottlieb
- Running time: 6 minutes
- Production company: Big Fish Entertainment

Original release
- Network: A&E
- Release: August 4, 2017 – March 14, 2020

Related
- Live PD

Live PD: Roll Call is an American reality docuseries and spin-off of Live PD hosted by Dan Abrams, Tom Morris, Jr., and Sean "Sticks" Larkin. Until Live PD's cancellation, it served as a six-minute promotional tease of that night's episode of Live PD that aired one hour before the parent show.

Roll Call previewed that evening's Live PD episode, including police departments and officers followed, along with a brief recap of the previous episode. The series premiered on August 4, 2017 and aired concurrently with Live PD's schedule.

When Live PD temporarily ceased production in 2020 due to the COVID-19 pandemic, Roll Call was also dropped from A&E's schedule. While the parent show returned to air in a modified format three weeks later, Roll Call did not, and Live PD was eventually canceled on June 10, 2020, in the wake of the murder of George Floyd.

== Series overview ==
Season	Episodes	Originally released	
Season	Episodes	First released	Last released
1	6	August 4, 2017	August 19, 2017
2	82	October 6, 2017	August 25, 2018
3	88	September 21, 2018	August 24, 2019
4	51	September 20, 2019	March 14, 2020
